= 2004 FIVB World Grand Prix squads =

This article show all participating team squads at the 2004 FIVB Women's Volleyball World Grand Prix, played by twelve countries from 9 July to 1 August 2004 with the final round held in Reggio Calabria, Italy.

== Brazil ==
- Head Coach: José Roberto Guimarães

#	Name	Date of Birth	Height	Weight	Spike	Block
1	Walewska Oliveira	01.10.1979	190	73	310	290
2	Elisângela Oliveira	30.10.1978	184	81	302	282
3	Erika Coimbra	23.03.1980	180	64	301	280
5	Marianne Steinbrecher	23.08.1983	188	70	310	290
6	Caroline Gattaz	27.07.1981	191	87	294	280
7	Hélia Souza	10.03.1970	173	63	283	264
8	Valeska Menezes	23.04.1976	180	62	302	290
9	Welissa Gonzaga	09.09.1982	179	76	300	287
10	Virna Dias	31.08.1971	184	70	306	294
11	Ana Chagas	18.10.1971	179	59	296	286
12	Leila Barros	30.09.1971	179	72	300	291
14	Fernanda Venturini (c)	24.10.1970	180	69	292	280
15	Arlene Xavier	20.12.1969	177	74	299	290
16	Fabiana Claudino	24.01.1985	193	76	314	293

== China ==
- Head Coach: Chen Zhonghe

#	Name	Date of Birth	Height	Weight	Spike	Block
1	Wang Yimei	11.01.1988	190	80	310	300
2	Feng Kun (c)	28.12.1978	183	75	319	310
3	Yang Hao	21.03.1980	183	75	319	314
4	Liu Yanan	29.09.1980	186	73	320	313
5	Chu Jinling	29.07.1984	190	74	316	305
6	Li Shan	21.05.1980	185	72	317	300
7	Zhou Suhong	23.04.1979	182	75	313	305
8	Zhao Ruirui	08.10.1981	196	75	326	315
9	Zhang Yuehong	09.11.1975	182	73	324	322
10	Chen Jing	03.09.1975	182	75	312	306
11	Yang Shuang	24.05.1985	185	75	310	300
12	Song Nina	07.04.1980	179	65	303	293
13	Wang Ting	19.11.1984	187	68	315	305
14	Zhao Jing	26.03.1983	190	73	319	308
15	Wang Lina	05.02.1978	181	75	319	300
16	Zhang Na	19.04.1980	180	72	302	292
17	Li Yan	01.05.1976	178	75	305	300
18	Zhang Ping	23.03.1982	187	73	312	301

== Cuba ==
- Head Coach: Luis Felipe Calderón

#	Name	Date of Birth	Height	Weight	Spike	Block
1	Yumilka Ruiz (c)	08.05.1978	179	62	329	315
2	Yanelis Santos	30.03.1986	183	71	315	312
3	Nancy Carrillo de la Paz	11.01.1986	190	74	318	315
4	Yusleinis Herrera	12.03.1984	180	67	312	310
5	Maisbelis Martínez Adlum	13.06.1977	182	79	322	306
6	Daimí Ramírez	08.10.1983	176	67	305	290
7	Dalina Bocour	22.07.1984	190	65	316	312
8	Yaima Ortiz	09.11.1981	179	70	325	313
10	Ana Fernández	03.08.1973	185	78	325	316
11	Liana Mesa	26.12.1977	179	70	318	307
12	Rosir Calderón	28.12.1984	191	66	330	325
13	Anniara Muñoz Carrazana	24.01.1980	180	69	320	312
14	Kenia Carcaces	22.01.1986	188	69	308	306
15	Marhta Zamora	15.10.1983	187	67	319	318
16	María Téllez	12.09.1983	186	69	320	316
17	Marta Sánchez	17.05.1973	182	75	324	310
18	Zoila Barros	06.08.1976	188	76	325	312

== Dominican Republic ==
- Head Coach: Jorge Garbey

#	Name	Date of Birth	Height	Weight	Spike	Block
1	Annerys Vargas	07.08.1982	191	70	303	298
2	Rosalín Ángeles	23.07.1987	189	61	310	300
3	Yudelkys Bautista	05.12.1974	193	68	312	308
4	Cindy Rondón	12.11.1988	183	61	312	305
5	Evelyn Carrera	05.10.1971	182	70	301	297
6	Alexandra Caso	25.04.1987	168	59	243	241
7	Sofía Mercedes	25.05.1976	185	70	306	298
8	Juana Saviñón	13.09.1980	181	75	303	300
9	Bethania de la Cruz	13.05.1989	189	58	322	305
10	Milagros Cabral	17.10.1978	185	63	308	305
11	Juana Miguelina González	03.01.1979	185	70	295	290
12	Francia Jackson	08.11.1975	168	71	280	275
13	Laritza Reyes	30.09.1982	182	61	305	300
14	Prisilla Rivera	29.12.1986	183	67	309	305
15	Cosiri Rodríguez (c)	30.08.1977	191	72	313	305
16	Kenya Moreta	07.04.1981	191	76	310	305
17	Dahiana Burgos	07.04.1985	183	58	312	302
18	Johanna Luna	16.04.1985	188	60	305	302

== Germany ==
- Head Coach: Lee Hee-Wan

#	Name	Date of Birth	Height	Weight	Spike	Block
1	Andrea Berg	19.01.1981	188	71	306	299
2	Kathleen Weiß	02.02.1984	171	55	286	266
3	Tanja Hart	24.01.1974	176	70	291	275
4	Kerstin Tzscherlich	15.02.1978	179	75	295	282
5	Bettina Stumpf	09.06.1984	184	85	298	284
6	Julia Schlecht	16.03.1980	182	67	298	277
7	Galina Knaus	14.03.1981	178	66	293	271
8	Cornelia Dumler	22.01.1982	181	69	309	285
9	Christina Benecke	14.10.1974	190	80	314	291
10	Tina Gollan	09.10.1984	197	83	315	299
11	Christiane Fürst	29.03.1985	192	74	305	291
12	Olessya Kulakova	31.01.1977	190	70	315	298
13	Atika Bouagaa	22.05.1982	184	69	306	289
14	Kathy Radzuweit	02.03.1982	196	72	319	300
15	Angelina Grün (c)	02.12.1979	185	67	309	287
16	Judith Sylvester	13.10.1977	193	85	312	296
17	Birgit Thumm	03.07.1980	184	70	310	289
18	Sabrina Roß	11.04.1980	185	68	300	288

== Italy ==
- Head Coach: Marco Bonitta

#	Name	Date of Birth	Height	Weight	Spike	Block
1	Simona Gioli	17.09.1977	185	72	307	283
2	Simona Rinieri	01.09.1977	188	85	307	281
3	Elisa Togut	14.05.1978	192	70	320	295
4	Manuela Leggeri (c)	09.05.1976	183	74	312	281
5	Sara Anzanello	30.07.1980	193	78	316	298
6	Valentina Fiorin	09.10.1984	187	69	305	287
7	Maurizia Cacciatori	06.04.1973	178	64	298	274
8	Jenny Barazza	24.07.1981	188	77	300	285
9	Nadia Centoni	19.06.1981	182	63	307	291
10	Paola Paggi	06.12.1976	182	72	306	278
11	Darina Mifkova	24.05.1974	185	78	308	279
12	Francesca Piccinini	10.01.1979	180	75	304	279
13	Manuela Secolo	22.02.1977	180	70	302	279
14	Eleonora Lo Bianco	22.12.1979	172	70	287	273
15	Antonella Del Core	05.11.1980	180	73	296	279
16	Francesca Ferretti	15.02.1984	180	70	296	280
17	Paola Cardullo	18.03.1982	162	56	275	268
18	Isabella Zilio	05.03.1983	174	60	278	262

== Japan ==
- Head Coach: Shoichi Yanagimoto

#	Name	Date of Birth	Height	Weight	Spike	Block
1	Tomoko Yoshihara (c)	04.02.1970	180	63	305	295
2	Chie Tsuji	09.08.1969	177	68	298	285
3	Ikumi Narita	01.01.1976	173	67	299	276
4	Miki Sasaki	15.12.1976	182	76	317	307
5	Kanako Omura	15.12.1976	184	69	319	290
6	Maiko Kano	15.07.1988	184	68	303	284
7	Yoshie Takeshita	18.03.1978	159	55	280	270
8	Mihoko Tsutsui	06.12.1985	176	63	293	285
9	Miyuki Takahashi	25.12.1978	170	68	285	280
10	Yumika Yokoyama	02.03.1987	188	74	303	294
11	Yuko Sano	26.07.1979	158	53	260	250
12	Sachiko Sugiyama	19.10.1979	184	69	310	305
13	Ai Otomo	24.03.1982	183	70	312	305
14	Kana Oyama	19.06.1984	187	82	308	287
15	Saori Arita	10.07.1984	180	64	305	296
16	Megumi Kurihara	31.07.1984	186	68	305	285
17	Erika Araki	03.08.1984	186	81	307	302
18	Saori Kimura	19.08.1986	182	66	298	293

== Poland ==
- Head Coach: Andrzej Niemczyk

#	Name	Date of Birth	Height	Weight	Spike	Block
1	Katarzyna Skowrońska	30.06.1983	187	73	305	288
2	Mariola Barbachowska	03.07.1982	175	65	300	290
3	Agata Karczmarzewska	27.06.1978	187	71	312	302
4	Izabela Bełcik	29.11.1980	185	65	304	292
5	Magdalena Śliwa (c)	17.11.1969	171	71	292	287
6	Anna Podolec	30.10.1985	193	71	318	305
7	Małgorzata Glinka	30.09.1978	190	84	314	303
8	Joanna Mirek	17.02.1977	186	69	314	306
9	Agata Mróz	07.04.1982	191	74	312	301
10	Dorota Świeniewicz	27.07.1972	180	64	315	305
11	Kamila Frątczak	25.11.1979	191	73	307	301
12	Joanna Kaczor	16.09.1984	188	64	305	290
13	Dominika Leśniewicz	13.01.1974	174	65	277	268
14	Maria Liktoras	20.02.1975	191	73	312	302
15	Anna Świderek	01.04.1979	184	66	308	296
16	Aleksandra Przybysz	02.06.1980	180	70	308	291
17	Berenika Tomsia	18.03.1988	188	65	315	304
18	Karolina Ciaszkiewicz	07.09.1979	183	76	305	291

== South Korea ==
- Head Coach: Kim Cheol-yong

#	Name	Date of Birth	Height	Weight	Spike	Block
1	Lee Jung-ok	19.07.1983	179	72	280	272
2	Lim Yu-jin	24.11.1983	180	70	280	270
3	Kang Hye-mi	27.04.1974	173	62	300	285
4	Ku Min-jung (c)	25.08.1973	181	73	315	300
5	Kim Sa-nee	21.06.1981	180	72	302	292
6	Choi Kwang-hee	25.05.1974	173	73	304	289
7	Park Mee-kyung	13.05.1975	180	69	315	303
8	Nam Jie-youn	25.05.1983	172	63	290	278
9	Chang So-yun	11.11.1974	184	76	312	301
10	Park Su-kouyng	17.08.1983	175	67	280	271
11	Kim Mi-jin	22.07.1979	182	65	300	290
12	Pak Sun-mi	03.02.1982	176	64	275	268
13	Jung Dae-young	12.08.1981	183	73	315	308
14	Han Song-yi	05.09.1984	185	67	304	291
15	Kim Se-young	04.06.1981	190	71	315	300
16	Koo Ki-lan	10.03.1977	170	64	274	264
17	Kim So-jeong	30.05.1982	180	72	307	294
18	Yoon Su-hyun	08.06.1983	177	67	275	270

== Russia ==
- Head Coach: Nikolay Karpol

#	Name	Date of Birth	Height	Weight	Spike	Block
1	Tatiana Gorchkova	08.03.1981	198	75	314	305
2	Irina Tebenikhina	05.12.1978	189	76	308	299
3	Anastasia Belikova	22.07.1979	190	78	306	300
4	Olga Fadeeva	26.05.1972	168	66	275	270
5	Anna Beskova	22.07.1986	192	73	305	300
6	Anna Kosnyreva	10.07.1986	179	68	287	282
7	Natalia Safronova	06.02.1979	185	68	300	293
8	Aleksandra Passynkova	14.04.1986	191	71	302	296
9	Natalia Vdovina	23.10.1976	190	76	298	292
10	Olga Chukanova	09.06.1980	182	69	305	294
11	Yekaterina Gamova	17.10.1980	204	80	321	310
12	Marina Sheshenina	26.06.1985	180	62	289	277
13	Aleksandra Korukovets (c)	01.10.1976	186	74	305	302
14	Yelena Plotnikova	26.07.1978	186	73	306	298
15	Yelena Godina	17.09.1977	192	72	317	310
16	Olga Sazhina	19.02.1986	186	72	300	295
17	Svetlana Akoulova	10.04.1984	180	68	297	287
18	Yelena Sennikova	20.03.1979	178	72	294	286

== Thailand ==
- Head Coach: Nataphon Srisamutnak

#	Name	Date of Birth	Height	Weight	Spike	Block
1	Wanna Buakaew	02.01.1981	175	51	287	269
2	Tikamporn Changkeaw	12.12.1984	168	65	254	243
3	Saymai Paladsrichuay	08.04.1987	183	64	300	278
4	Nurak Nokputta	31.01.1981	179	63	295	280
5	Pleumjit Thinkaow	09.11.1983	183	63	289	279
6	Rattanaporn Sanuanram	09.04.1980	180	65	296	282
7	Narumon Khanan	26.01.1983	180	64	298	278
8	Prim Jitwises	05.10.1970	173	54	280	270
9	Piyamas Koijapo	23.10.1978	178	67	298	282
10	Wilavan Apinyapong	06.06.1984	174	67	282	268
11	Amporn Hyapha	19.05.1985	182	65	296	285
12	Warapan Thinprabat	06.11.1981	178	70	289	275
13	Nootsara Tomkom	07.07.1985	170	58	279	262
14	Patcharee Sangmuang (c)	20.03.1978	181	66	294	279
15	Malika Kanthong	08.01.1987	178	61	292	278
16	Suphap Phongthong	16.05.1981	178	61	299	276
17	Wasana Pekyian	16.02.1982	180	62	290	280
18	Bouard Lithawat	20.07.1984	180	68	293	278

== United States ==
- Head Coach: Toshi Yoshida

#	Name	Date of Birth	Height	Weight	Spike	Block
1	Prikeba Phipps	30.06.1969	190	77	319	303
2	Danielle Scott	01.10.1972	188	84	325	302
3	Tayyiba Haneef	23.03.1979	201	80	318	299
4	Lindsey Berg	16.07.1980	173	81	285	270
5	Stacy Sykora	24.06.1977	176	61	305	295
6	Elisabeth Bachman	07.11.1978	193	88	319	299
7	Heather Bown	29.11.1978	188	90	301	290
8	Greichaly Cepero	11.08.1981	188	70	309	300
9	Ogonna Nnamani	29.07.1983	185	79	315	305
10	Sarah Drury	17.06.1981	165	59	285	268
11	Robyn Ah Mow-Santos	15.09.1975	172	68	291	281
12	Nancy Metcalf	12.11.1978	186	73	314	292
13	Tara Cross-Battle (c)	16.09.1968	180	71	302	301
14	Elisha Thomas	20.07.1981	191	75	321	299
15	Logan Tom	25.05.1981	186	80	306	297
16	Sarah Noriega	24.04.1976	187	70	302	301
17	Therese Crawford	26.08.1976	178	64	312	304
18	Cynthia Barboza	07.02.1987	183	73	310	285
