= 2003 FIVB Volleyball Women's World Cup squads =

This article shows all participating team squads at the 2003 FIVB Volleyball Women's World Cup, held from November 1 to November 15, 2003, in several cities in Japan.

== Argentina ==
- Head Coach: Hugo Jáuregui

#	Name	Date of Birth	Height	Weight	Spike	Block
1	Georgina Pinedo	30.05.1981	177	65	305	281
2	Julieta Borghi	06.05.1982	190	81	298	285
3	María Paredes	07.10.1966	163	69	270	250
4	Daniela Preiti	22.02.1972	165	62	292	278
5	Maia Constant	17.10.1980	176	66	310	280
7	Paula Parisi	15.09.1967	177	68	305	283
8	Sandra Kobetic	14.12.1963	165	65	270	250
9	Mariana Burgos	25.10.1977	185	70	290	275
10	María Vincente (c)	25.11.1977	172	59	292	273
11	Mónica Kostolnik	08.02.1969	172	63	285	270
12	Natalia Mildenberger	19.02.1978	189	91	302	285
17	Karina Pacheco	03.10.1977	179	77	305	283

== Brazil ==
- Head Coach: José Roberto Guimarães

#	Name	Date of Birth	Height	Weight	Spike	Block
1	Walewska Oliveira	01.10.1979	190	73	310	290
2	Erika Coimbra	23.03.1980	180	64	301	280
4	Raquel Silva	30.04.1978	191	69	300	282
7	Hélia Souza	10.03.1970	174	63	283	264
8	Valeska Menezes	23.04.1976	180	62	302	290
9	Welissa Gonzaga	09.09.1982	180	76	300	287
10	Virna Dias	31.08.1971	186	70	306	294
11	Ana Chagas	18.10.1971	179	59	296	286
12	Paula Pequeno	22.01.1982	183	74	302	285
14	Fernanda Venturini (c)	24.10.1970	180	69	292	280
15	Arlene Xavier	20.12.1969	177	74	299	290
16	Fabiana Claudino	24.01.1985	194	76	314	293

== China ==
- Head Coach: Chen Zhonghe

#	Name	Date of Birth	Height	Weight	Spike	Block
2	Feng Kun (c)	28.12.1978	183	75	319	310
3	Yang Hao	21.03.1980	183	75	319	314
4	Liu Yanan	29.09.1980	186	73	320	313
6	Li Shan	21.05.1980	185	72	317	300
7	Zhou Suhong	23.04.1979	182	75	313	305
8	Zhao Ruirui	08.10.1981	198	75	326	315
9	Zhang Yuehong	09.11.1975	182	73	324	322
10	Chen Jing	03.09.1975	182	75	312	306
12	Song Nina	07.04.1980	179	65	303	293
15	Wang Lina	05.02.1978	181	75	319	300
16	Zhang Na	19.04.1980	180	72	302	292
18	Zhang Ping	23.03.1982	187	73	312	301

== Cuba ==
- Head Coach: Luis Felipe Calderón

#	Name	Date of Birth	Height	Weight	Spike	Block
1	Yumilka Ruiz (c)	08.05.1978	179	62	329	315
2	Yanelis Santos	30.03.1986	180	63	326	305
3	Nancy Carrillo	11.01.1986	190	74	318	315
4	Daimí Ramírez	08.10.1983	181	67	305	290
5	Maisbelis Martínez	13.06.1977	182	79	322	306
8	Yaima Ortiz	09.11.1981	178	70	325	313
11	Liana Mesa	26.12.1977	183	70	318	307
12	Rosir Calderón	28.12.1984	189	66	330	325
13	Anniara Muñoz	24.01.1980	180	69	320	312
16	María Téllez	12.09.1983	186	69	320	316
17	Marta Sánchez	17.05.1973	182	75	324	310
18	Zoila Barros	06.08.1976	188	76	325	312

== Dominican Republic ==
- Head Coach: Jorge Garbey

#	Name	Date of Birth	Height	Weight	Spike	Block
1	Annerys Vargas	07.08.1982	191	70	303	298
2	Rosalín Ángeles	23.07.1987	189	61	310	300
3	Yudelkys Bautista	05.12.1974	193	68	312	308
5	Evelyn Carrera	05.10.1971	182	70	301	297
7	Sofía Mercedes (c)	25.05.1976	185	70	306	298
9	Nuris Arias	20.05.1978	191	69	310	304
10	Milagros Cabral	17.10.1978	185	63	308	305
11	Juana Miguelina González	03.01.1979	185	70	295	290
12	Francia Jackson	08.11.1975	168	71	280	275
14	Prisilla Rivera	29.12.1986	183	67	309	305
15	Cosiri Rodríguez	30.08.1977	191	72	313	305
16	Kenya Moreta	07.04.1981	191	76	310	305

== Egypt ==
- Head Coach: Hesham Badrawey

#	Name	Date of Birth	Height	Weight	Spike	Block
1	Sherihan Abdelfattlah	25.09.1986	181	69	285	277
5	Nagwa El-Masry	12.08.1983	172	62	282	275
7	Eman El-Nossiry	01.06.1987	177	67	271	268
8	Dina Youssef	28.02.1985	172	69	285	280
9	Yosra Selim	11.04.1981	172	60	283	273
10	Ingy El-Shamy	06.09.1986	176	64	285	275
11	Tahani Toson (c)	22.09.1971	177	77	305	295
12	Sara Talaat Aly	01.09.1982	170	66	269	264
15	Mona Badawy	16.01.1982	182	71	281	282
16	Noha Eid	10.03.1987	178	65	280	274
17	Nouran Sharaf	30.09.1985	175	62	279	270
18	Neamat Badawy	02.01.1981	184	84	299	290

== Italy ==
- Head Coach: Marco Bonitta

#	Name	Date of Birth	Height	Weight	Spike	Block
1	Simona Gioli	17.09.1977	184	72	307	283
2	Simona Rinieri	01.09.1977	188	85	307	281
4	Manuela Leggeri (c)	09.05.1976	186	74	312	281
6	Valentina Fiorin	09.10.1984	186	69	305	287
9	Nadia Centoni	19.06.1981	183	63	307	291
10	Paola Paggi	06.12.1976	182	72	306	278
11	Darina Mifkova	24.05.1974	188	78	308	279
12	Francesca Piccinini	10.01.1979	183	75	304	279
13	Rachele Sangiuliano	23.06.1981	182	67	304	279
14	Eleonora Lo Bianco	22.12.1979	171	70	287	273
16	Jenny Barazza	24.07.1981	188	77	300	285
17	Paola Cardullo	18.03.1982	162	56	275	268

== Japan ==
- Head Coach: Shoichi Yanagimoto

#	Name	Date of Birth	Height	Weight	Spike	Block
1	Tomoko Yoshihara (c)	04.02.1970	180	63	305	295
2	Chie Tsuji	09.08.1969	177	68	298	285
4	Miki Sasaki	15.12.1976	182	76	317	307
5	Kanako Omura	15.12.1976	184	69	319	290
7	Yoshie Takeshita	18.03.1978	159	55	280	270
9	Miyuki Takahashi	25.12.1978	170	68	285	280
10	Makiko Horai	06.01.1979	187	68	312	292
11	Yuko Sano	26.07.1979	158	53	260	250
12	Sachiko Sugiyama	19.10.1979	184	69	310	305
15	Saori Kimura	19.08.1986	182	66	298	293
17	Kana Oyama	19.06.1984	187	82	308	287
18	Megumi Kurihara	31.07.1984	186	68	305	285

== Poland ==
- Head Coach: Ryszard Niemczyk

#	Name	Date of Birth	Height	Weight	Spike	Block
1	Katarzyna Skowrońska	30.06.1983	189	73	305	288
2	Mariola Barbachowska	03.07.1982	175	65	300	290
4	Izabela Bełcik	29.11.1980	185	65	304	292
5	Magdalena Sliwa (c)	17.11.1969	173	71	292	287
6	Anna Podolec	30.10.1985	195	71	318	305
7	Malgorzata Glinka	30.09.1978	194	84	314	303
9	Agata Mroz	07.04.1982	193	74	312	301
10	Malgorzata Niemczyk	25.10.1969	178	64	312	301
11	Kamila Fratczak	25.11.1979	191	73	307	301
14	Maria Liktoras	20.02.1975	192	73	312	302
16	Aleksandra Przybysz	02.06.1980	180	70	308	291
18	Izabela Zebrowska	23.02.1985	186	77	300	283

== South Korea ==
- Head Coach: Kim Cheol-yong

#	Name	Date of Birth	Height	Weight	Spike	Block
3	Kang Hye-mi	27.04.1974	173	62	300	285
4	Nam Jie-youn	25.05.1983	172	63	290	278
5	Kim Sa-nee	21.06.1981	180	72	302	292
6	Choi Kwang-hee (c)	25.05.1974	173	73	304	289
7	Park Mee-kyung	13.05.1975	181	68	315	303
8	Koo Ki-lan	10.03.1977	170	64	274	264
9	Chang So-yun	11.11.1974	184	76	312	301
11	Lee Meong-hee	07.04.1978	174	62	310	295
12	Yang Sook-kyung	05.03.1977	180	70	300	291
13	Jung Dae-young	12.08.1981	183	73	315	308
14	Lim Yu-jin	24.11.1983	179	69	280	270
15	Kim Se-young	04.06.1981	190	71	315	300

== Turkey ==
- Head Coach: Reşat Yazıcıoğulları

#	Name	Date of Birth	Height	Weight	Spike	Block
1	Bahar Urcu	13.12.1975	181	64	286	280
2	Esra Gümüş	02.10.1982	181	76	290	281
3	Sinem Akap	01.01.1982	187	71	291	284
4	Özlem Özçelik (c)	01.01.1972	194	73	309	300
5	Aysun Özbek	18.03.1977	186	74	303	295
6	Gökçen Denkel	08.02.1985	192	73	304	296
7	Natalia Hanikoğlu	23.06.1975	193	77	304	295
10	Gözde Kırdar	26.06.1985	180	63	295	283
11	Pelin Çelik	23.05.1982	173	61	278	268
13	Gülden Kayalar	05.12.1980	168	55	269	257
16	Seda Tokatlıoğlu	25.06.1986	192	64	303	297
17	Neslihan Demir Darnel	09.12.1983	187	72	298	292

== United States ==
- Head Coach: Toshi Yoshida

#	Name	Date of Birth	Height	Weight	Spike	Block
1	Prikeba Phipps	30.06.1969	191	77	319	303
2	Danielle Scott (c)	01.10.1972	188	84	325	302
3	Tayyiba Haneef	23.03.1979	200	80	318	299
4	Lindsey Berg	16.07.1980	173	81	285	270
5	Stacy Sykora	24.06.1977	176	61	305	295
6	Elisabeth Bachman	07.11.1978	192	88	319	299
7	Heather Bown	29.11.1978	188	90	301	290
11	Robyn Ah Mow-Santos	15.09.1975	171	68	291	281
13	Tara Cross-Battle	16.09.1968	180	71	302	301
15	Logan Tom	25.05.1981	184	80	306	297
16	Sarah Noriega	24.04.1976	188	70	302	301
18	Nancy Metcalf	12.11.1978	184	73	314	292
