= Ana Beatriz Francisco das Chagas =

Brazilian volleyball player (born 1971)

Ana Beatriz Francisco

Personal information
- Full name: Ana Beatriz Francisco das Chagas
- Nickname: Bia
- Nationality: Brazil
- Born: October 18, 1971 (age 55); Rio de Janeiro, Brazil
- Hometown: Rio de Janeiro, Brazil
- Height: 1.79 m (5 ft 10 1/2 in)
- Weight: 62 kg (137 lb)
- Spike: 286 cm (113 in)
- Block: 296 cm (117 in)

Volleyball information
- Position: Outside hitter
- Current club: Retired

National team
1997–2004	Brazil
Honours
Women's volleyball
Representing Brazil
World Cup
Silver medal – second place	2003 Japan	Team
World Grand Prix
Gold medal – first place	2004 Reggio Calabria	Team
South American Championship
Gold medal – first place	1997 Lima
Gold medal – first place	2003 Bogotá

Ana Beatriz Francisco das Chagas also known as Bia (born October 18, 1971) is a Brazilian volleyball player. She is 179 cm and 62 kg.

She participated in the 2004 FIVB World Grand Prix. and 2004 Summer Olympics.

She played for Sollo Tietê, BCN/Osasco, Mappin Pinheiros, Universidade de Guarulhos, Petrobrás/Força Olímpica, MRV Minas, Macaé Nuceng, BCN/Osasco and Finasa/Osasco in Brazil, Fenerbahçe Acıbadem in Turkey, Ícaro Palma in Spain and now she currently plays for Mackenzie Cia do Terno.

== Career ==
Club	Country	Year
Sollo Tietê	Brazil	1994–1996
BCN/Osasco	Brazil	1996–1997
Mappin Pinheiros	Brazil	1997–1998
Universidade de Guarulhos	Brazil	1998–1999
Petrobrás/Força Olímpica	Brazil	1999–2000
MRV Minas	Brazil	2000–2001
Macaé Nuceng	Brazil	2001–2002
BCN/Osasco	Brazil	2002–2003
Finasa/Osasco	Brazil	2003–2006
Fenerbahçe	Turkey	2006–2007
Ícaro Palma	Spain	2007–2008
Mackenzie Cia do Terno	Brazil	2008-
