= Logan Tom =

American volleyball player (born 1981)

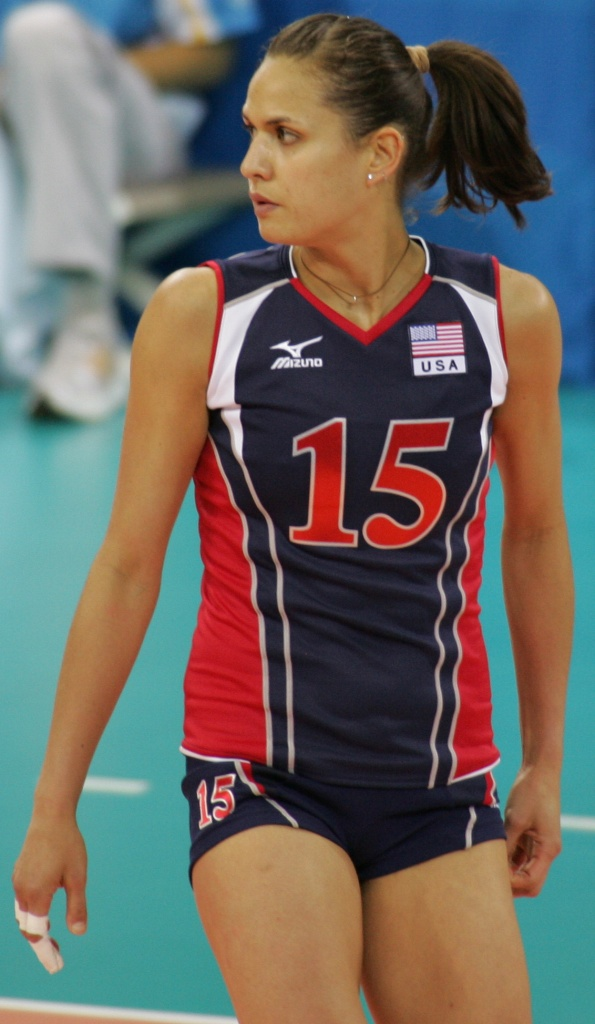
- Tom at the 2008 Summer Olympics in Beijing

Personal information
- Full name: Logan Maile Lei Tom
- Born: May 25, 1981 (age 45) Napa, California, U.S.
- Education: Stanford University
- Height: 186 cm (6 ft 1 in)
- Weight: 80 kg (176 lb)
- Spike: 306 cm (120 in)
- Block: 297 cm (117 in)

Volleyball information
- Position: Outside hitter
- Current club: (Israel) Hapoel KFAR-SABA
- Number: 15

Career
- Years: Team
- 2002-03: MRV/Minas
- 2003–04: Monte Schiavo Jesi
- 2004–05: Chieri Volley
- 2005–06: Voléro Zürich
- 2006–07: CV Tenerife
- 2007–08: Dinamo Moscow
- 2008–09: Hisamitsu Springs
- 2009–10: Asystel Novara
- 2010–11: Guangdong Evergrande
- 2011–12: Fenerbahçe Universal
- 2012–13: Rio de Janeiro/Unilever/SKY
- 2013–14: Openjobmetis Ornavasso
- 2014–15: RC Cannes
- 2015–16: Halkbank Ankara
- 2016–17: Jakarta Pertamina Energi
- 2017: Harbour Raiders VC
- 2017–19: Maccabi XT Haifa

National team
- Years: Team
- 1999–2012: (United States) USA
Medal record
Women's volleyball
Representing the United States
Olympic Games
Silver medal – second place	2008 Beijing	Team
Silver medal – second place	2012 London	Team
FIVB World Championship
Silver medal – second place	2002 Germany	Team
FIVB World Cup
Silver medal – second place	2011 Japan	Team
Bronze medal – third place	2003 Japan	Team
Bronze medal – third place	2007 Japan	Team
FIVB World Grand Prix
Gold medal – first place	2001 Macau	Team
Gold medal – first place	2010 Ningbo	Team
Gold medal – first place	2011 Macau	Team
Bronze medal – third place	2003 Andria	Team
Bronze medal – third place	2004 Reggio Calabria	Team
NORCECA Championship
Gold medal – first place	2003 Santo Domingo
Gold medal – first place	2011 Caguas
Pan American Cup
Gold medal – first place	2003 Saltillo
- Updated on November 2017

Logan Maile Lei Tom (born May 25, 1981) is an American former indoor volleyball and beach volleyball player, and is the current head coach of the Israel women's national volleyball team. She is a four-time Olympian at the outside hitter position. At age 19, Logan became the youngest woman ever to be selected for an American Olympic volleyball team when she competed at the 2000 Olympic Games in Sydney. She was a skilled all-around player who brought stability to the American serve receive and defense, while also providing the team with a solid attack and block at the net. She was a huge part of the national team from 2000 to 2012. At the 2008 Olympics, Tom helped Team USA win a silver medal and was named Best Scorer, she won another silver medal at the 2012 Olympics with the national team. She was also awarded the Most Valuable Player of the 2004 FIVB World Grand Prix.

In October 2021, she was inducted into the International Volleyball Hall of Fame, along with Clay Stanley and Todd Rogers.

== High school and personal life ==
Logan Tom was born in Napa, California to Kristine and Melvyn Tom. Her father was a defensive end for nine years in the NFL with the Philadelphia Eagles and the Chicago Bears. Though she grew up with her mother and older brother Landon in Salt Lake City, Utah, she spent her summers with her father and his relatives in Hawaii learning how to surf. She is of Chinese Hawaiian descent.

Tom attended Highland High School, where she led the volleyball team to state titles in 1997 and 1998. Tom also competed in basketball and track and was an All-state selection in basketball. She placed third in the state in the javelin as a senior and graduated with a 4.00 GPA and ranked first in her class. Tom also earned the Gatorade Player of the Year awards for volleyball in 1999. In 2000, she became the youngest woman to ever be selected for the USA Olympic volleyball team at 19.

Over the summer of 2003, Tom was selected as one of eight finalists for the Women's Sports Foundation Sportswoman of the Year Award in the team category.

In 2005, Tom was ranked 91st of the FHM magazine's 100 sexiest women list.

== Stanford ==
Tom attended Stanford University from 1999 to 2002 but did not graduate with her class. She left Stanford 50 units shy of completing her major in International Relations in December 2002, her last term of collegiate athletic eligibility. She officially graduated from Stanford in the summer of 2014. In October 2013, Tom was inducted into the Stanford University Athletics Hall of Fame.

=== 1999 (freshman) ===
Tom was named the American Volleyball Coaches Association (AVCA) and Pac-10 National Freshman of the Year and became only the fourth volleyball player in NCAA history to receive AVCA First Team All-America honors as a true freshman. She led the Cardinal and ranked second in the Pac-10 in both kills (4.63 kpg) and service aces (0.45 sapg) and ranked second on the team in digs (2.73 dpg). She finished with a total of 472 kills, while also adding a .320 attack percentage (#8 Pac-10) and a 0.94 block per game average.

She was named the NCAA Final Four All-Tournament Team after having 29 kills in the NCAA semifinal match against defending national champion Long Beach State. Her squad finished as NCAA runners-up to Penn State.

=== 2000 (sophomore) ===
Tom missed a month and a half of the season while playing on the U.S. national volleyball team in the 2000 Olympics. Tom is the first woman in the history of Stanford athletics to appear in the Olympics and then return to compete for Stanford. She was named an AVCA First Team All-American. For the year, she averaged 5.86 kills, 3.20 digs, 0.41 service aces and 0.86 blocks per game and hit .350 for the season. She notched double figures in kills in 16 consecutive matches.

=== 2001 (junior) ===
Tom was named the AVCA National Player of the Year, in addition to being named the Honda Award winner for volleyball, the Pac-10 Player of the Year and her third consecutive First Team All-America honor. She averaged 5.09 kills, 0.54 service aces, 3.49 digs and 0.90 blocks per game and played in 122 games (35 matches). She recorded 10 or more kills in 50 of 51 matches, dating back to the 2000 season and notched a double-double in 25 matches.

She was named the NCAA Women's Volleyball Championship Most Outstanding Player after leading her team to the 2001 National Championship over top ranked and previously undefeated Long Beach State as she had 25 kills, 12 digs and five blocks against the 49ers after having 22 kills and five blocks against Nebraska in the NCAA semifinal.

In 2002, she won the Honda Sports Award as the nation's top female collegiate volleyball player.

=== 2002 (senior) ===
She was named the AVCA National Player of the Year for the second consecutive year and become the third player in NCAA history to be named a First Team All-American for four consecutive years. She was the Honda Award winner for volleyball for the second year in a row and was named the Pac-10 Player of the Year for the second consecutive year.

She averaged 4.89 kills, 0.34 service aces, 3.28 digs, 0.82 blocks and 5.81 points per game and finished off her career with 1,939 career kills and is the all-time leader at Stanford surpassing Kristin Klein (1,909) and is third all-time in the Pac-10. Her 171 career service aces ranks second on in Stanford history and third in the league. She averaged 5.02 kills per game for her career which ranks second all-time in the conference record books.

She was named to the NCAA Final Four All-Tournament Team for the third time in her four years at Stanford, as she had 16 kills, 13 digs, four aces and four blocks in Stanford's losing effort to USC in the National Championship match.

In 2003, she repeated as the winner of the Honda Sports Award, given to the nation's top female collegiate volleyball player.

== Olympic and international career ==
Tom's very first professional appearance was with the Brazilian team, MRV/Minas of the Brazil Superliga, on January 18, 2003, exactly two weeks after signing with them, on January 4, 2003.

Tom appeared in the 2000 Sydney Olympics (4th place), 2004 Athens Olympics (5th place), 2008 Beijing Olympics (silver medal), and the 2012 London Olympics (silver medal). Tom was named Best Scorer of the 2008 Olympic games.

In 2004, Tom was named the Most Valuable Player of the World Grand Prix after leading all players in scoring with 224 points in 13 matches (179 kills, 24 blocks and 21 service aces) where she also garnered Best Server accolades.

From 2004–2007, she took a break from the national team, after claiming to be "burnt out" after a disappointing 5th-place finish at the Athens Olympics. However despite that, she continued to play professionally in Italy, Switzerland, and Spain. She also played beach volleyball (partnering with Holly McPeak, among others). She was the 2006 AVP Rookie of the Year and recorded 14 top-10 finishes in 2007.

In 2007, she was named one of three FIVB World Cup most valuable player nominees as she averaged 4.10 points per set at the World Cup in her first international tournament with Team USA in nearly three years. She averaged 3.35 kills, 0.65 blocks, 1.95 digs and 0.10 aces per set at the World Cup while starting 40 of 41 sets.

On September 15, 2008, Hisamitsu Springs, a women's volleyball team based in Kobe city, Hyogo, and Tosu city, Saga, Japan, announced her arrival on the team.

She was named Best Receiver at the 2010 World Championship.

Tom earned the Best Server award and the gold medal at the 2011 NORCECA Championship, held in Caguas, Puerto Rico.

Tom joined the Indonesian club Jakarta Pertamina Energi for the 2016 season, taking them to the championship playoff. The New Zealand club Harbour Raiders announced that Tom would play with them in 2017, and she helped them win the local league championship. She then joined the Israeli club Maccabi XT Haifa for the 2017/18 season.

== Web presence ==
In 2010, Tom began working with the instructional volleyball website Volleyball 1on1 where she appears as an online instructor showcasing her coaching abilities through interactive videos.

== Coaching ==
In May 2021, Tom was appointed as the head coach of the Israel women's national volleyball team.

== Awards ==
=== Individuals ===
- 2003 Pan-American Cup "Best receiver"
- 2003 Montreux Volley Masters "Best receiver"
- Yeltsin Cup|2003 Yeltsin Cup Tournament "Best server"
- 2004 FIVB World Grand Prix "Most valuable player"
- 2004 FIVB World Grand Prix "Best scorer"
- 2004 FIVB World Grand Prix "Best server"
- 2008 Summer Olympics "Best scorer"
- 2010 World Championship "Best receiver"
- 2011 NORCECA Championship "Best server"

=== College ===
- Four time First Team AVCA All-American (1999–2002)
- Four time First Team All-Pac-10 (1999-02)
- Four time First Team AVCA All-Pacific Region (1999-02)
- Three time NCAA Final Four All-Tournament Team (1999, 2001–02)
- Two time AVCA National Player of the Year (2001–02)
- Two time Honda Award winner for volleyball (2001–02)
- Two time Pac-10 Player of the Year (2001–02)
- 2002 NCAA Stanford Regional Most Outstanding Player
- 2002 Pac-10 All-Academic Honorable Mention
- 2002 Pac-10 Player of the Week (11/25)
- 2002 AVCA National Player of the Week (11/25)
- 2002 NACWAA/State Farm Classic MVP
- 2001 NCAA Championship Most Outstanding Player
- 2001 NCAA Stanford Regional Most Outstanding Player
- 2001 AVCA National Player of the Week (11/12)
- 2001 Jefferson Cup MVP
- 2001 Verizon/Texas A&M All-Tournament Team
- 2001 Asics/Volleyball Magazine Player of the Year
- 1999 AVCA National Freshman of the Year
- 1999 Pac-10 Freshman of the Year
- 1999 Asics/Volleyball Magazine Freshman of the Year
- 1999 Pacific Regional All-Tournament Team

=== Clubs ===
- 2005/06 Swiss Volleyball League – Champion, with Voléro Zürich
- 2005/06 Swiss Volleyball League Cup – Cup winner, with Voléro Zürich
- 2011/12 CEV Champions League – Champion, with Fenerbahçe Universal
- 2012/13 Brazilian Volleyball Superliga - Champion, with Unilever Vôlei
- 2015/2016 Runner up in Indonesian Volleyball League (Proliga) with Jakarta Pertamina Energi
- 2017 New Zealand League – Champion, with Harbour Raiders
- 2017/18 Israeli State Cup – Cup winner, with Maccabi Haifa
- 2017/18 Israeli Premier League – Champion, with Maccabi Haifa
- 2018/19 Israeli Premier League – Champion, with Maccabi Haifa

=== Other awards ===
- 2013 Inductee to the Stanford University Athletics Hall of Fame
- 2014 Inductee to the Utah Sports Hall of Fame
- 2015 Named as the Pac-12 Player of the Century by Pac-12 Network

Awards
Preceded by (Italy) Paola Cardullo	Most Valuable Player of FIVB World Grand Prix; 2004	Succeeded by (Brazil) Paula Pequeno
Preceded by (China) Yang Hao	Best Server of FIVB World Grand Prix; 2004	Succeeded by (China) Yang Hao
Preceded by (Russia) Ekaterina Gamova	Best Scorer of FIVB World Grand Prix; 2004	Succeeded by (Japan) Miyuki Takahashi
Preceded by (Russia) Ekaterina Gamova	Best Scorer of Olympic Games; Beijing 2008	Succeeded by (South Korea) Kim Yeon-koung
