= Érika Coimbra =

Brazilian volleyball player (born 1980)

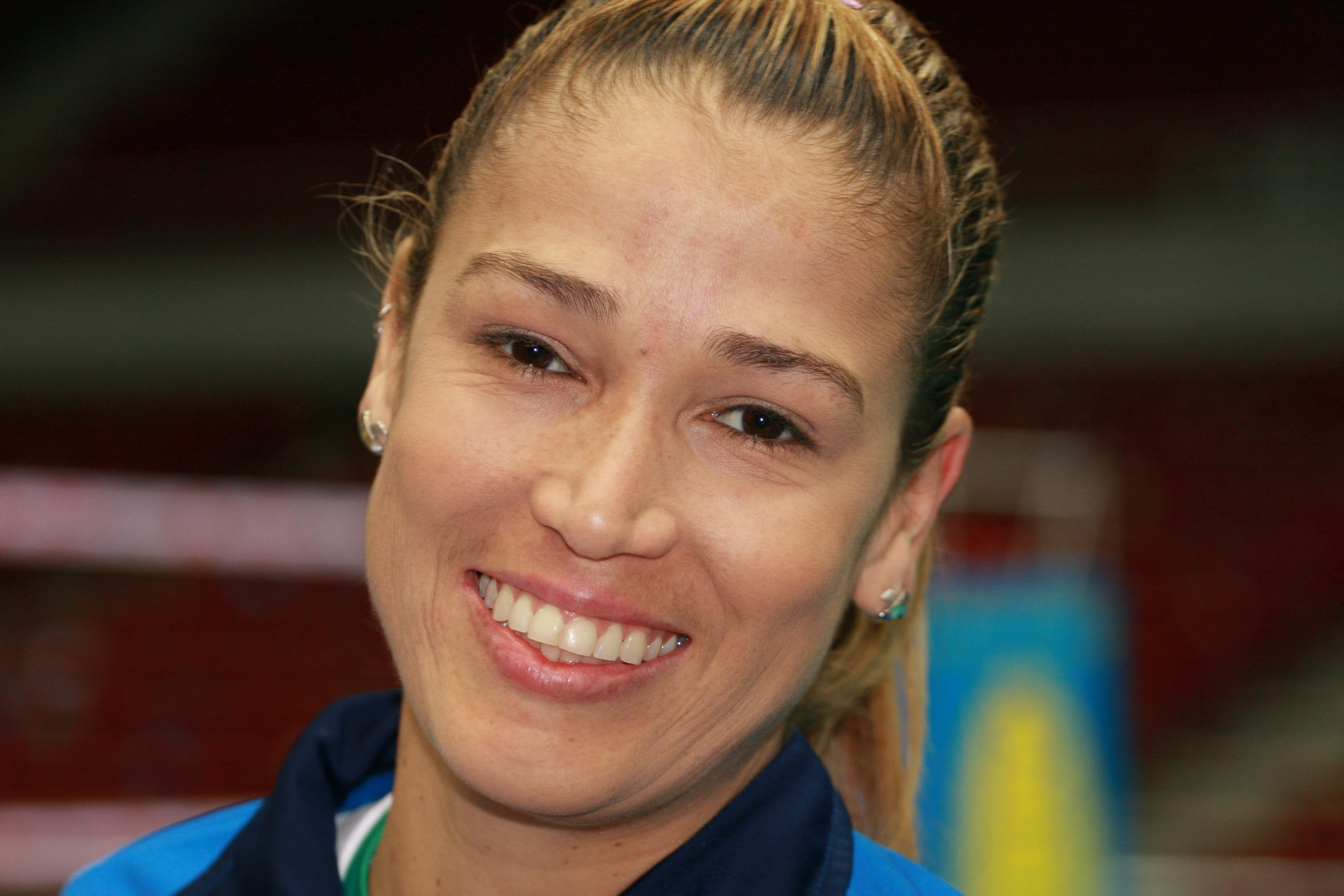
- Érika playing for Atom Trefl Sopot

Personal information
- Full name: Érika Kelly Pereira Coimbra
- Nickname: Kiki
- Born: 23 March 1980 (age 46); Belo Horizonte, MG, Brazil
- Height: 1.80 m (5 ft 11 in)
- Weight: 64 kg (141 lb)
- Spike: 301 cm (119 in)
- Block: 280 cm (110 in)

Volleyball information
- Position: Outside hitter
- Current club: Hinode/GRB Barueri

Career
Years	Teams
1997–2001; 2001–2003; 2003–2005; 2005–2006; 2006–2007; 2007–2008; 2008–2010; 2010–2011; 2011–2012; 2012–2013; 2014–2015; 2015–2016; 2016–2018; 2018–	Rexona Ades; MRV Minas; Finasa/Osasco; Oi Macaè; Famila Cheri; Brasil Telecom; Rio Vôlei Clube Rexona-Ades; Galatasaray Medical Park; Igtisadchi Baku; Atom Trefl Sopot; Brasília Vôlei; Bauru; Hinode/GRB Barueri; Maccabi Haifa

National team
1999–2007	Brazil
Honours
Women's volleyball
Representing Brazil
Olympic Games
Bronze medal – third place	2000 Sydney	Team
World Cup
Silver medal – second place	2003 Japan	Team
Bronze medal – third place	1999 Japan	Team
World Grand Prix
Gold medal – first place	2004 Reggio Calabria	Team
Bronze medal – third place	2000 Manila
Pan American Games
Gold medal – first place	1999 Winnipeg
Silver medal – second place	2007 Rio de Janeiro	Team
- Last updated: 12 July 2010

Érika Kelly "Kiki" Pereira Coimbra (born 23 March 1980) is a Brazilian volleyball player who competed for Brazil in the 2000 and 2004 Summer Olympic Games, and at the 1999 FIVB Volleyball Women's World Cup. She is a free agent.

Coimbra passed all genetic testing required by the FIVB and the International Olympic Committee to play the 2000 Summer Olympics where she won the bronze medal.

== Awards ==
=== Individuals ===
- 1997 FIVB U18 World Championship – "Most valuable player"
- 1997 FIVB U18 World Championship – "Best spiker"
- 1997 FIVB U18 World Championship – "Best scorer"
- 1999 FIVB U20 World Championship – "Most valuable player"
- 2000 FIVB World Grand Prix – "Best server"
- 2012–13 Polish League – "Most valuable player"
- 2013 Polish Cup – "Best receiver"

=== Clubs ===
- 1997–98 Brazilian Superliga – Champion, with Rexona Ades
- 1998–99 Brazilian Superliga – Runner-up, with Rexona Ades
- 1999–00 Brazilian Superliga – Champion, with Rexona Ades
- 2001–02 Brazilian Superliga – Champion, with Minas Tênis Clube
- 2002–03 Brazilian Superliga – Runner-up, with Minas Tênis Clube
- 2003–04 Brazilian Superliga – Champion, with Finasa Osasco
- 2004–05 Brazilian Superliga – Champion, with Finasa Osasco
- 2008–09 Brazilian Superliga – Champion, with Rexona Ades
- 2009–10 Brazilian Superliga – Runner-up, with Rexona Ades
- 2012–13 Polish League – Champion, with Atom Trefl Sopot
- 2009 South American Club Championship – Runner-up, with Rexona-Ades

Awards
Preceded by (Russia) Lyubov Sokolova	Best Server of FIVB World Grand Prix; 2000	Succeeded by (Cuba) Zoila Barros
