= Prikeba Phipps =

American volleyball player

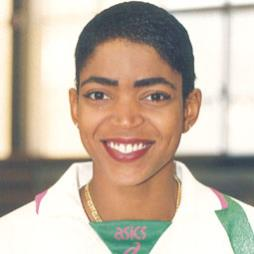

Personal information
- Full name: Prikeba Reed Phipps
- Nickname: Keba
- Born: June 30, 1969 (age 57); Los Angeles, California, U.S.
- Height: 6 ft 3 in (1.90 m)
- Spike: 126 in (319 cm)
- Block: 119 in (303 cm)

Volleyball information
- Position: Outside hitter
- Number: 12 (1988); 1 (2004)

National team
1987–2004	United States
Medal record
Women's volleyball
Representing the United States
World Championship
Silver medal – second place	2002 Germany	Team
FIVB World Cup
Bronze medal – third place	2003 Japan	Team
Pan American Games
Bronze medal – third place	1987 Indianapolis	Team

Prikeba ("Keba") Reed Phipps (born June 30, 1969) is an American former volleyball player and two-time Olympian who played for the United States women's national volleyball team. Phipps competed at the 1988 Summer Olympics in Seoul, where she was the youngest player on the roster, at 19 years old. She also competed at the 2004 Summer Olympics in Athens, where she finished in fifth place.

Phipps represented the United States at the age of 18 at the 1987 Pan American Games in Indianapolis, where she won a bronze medal.

== Clubs ==
Years	Team
1990–1991	Pallavolo Ancona
1991–1995	PVF Matera
1995–1997	Bergamo
1997–1998	Ester Napoli
1998–2001	Volley Modena
2001–2002	Bergamo
2002–2003	Giannino Pieralisi
2003–2004	Minas

== International Competitions ==
- 1987 – NORCECA Continental Championships (silver medal)
- 1987 – Pan American Games (bronze medal)
- 1988 – Olympic Games (seventh place)
- 1989 – NORCECA Continental Championships (bronze medal)
- 2002 – World Championships (silver medal)
- 2003 – FIVB World Grand Prix (bronze medal)
- 2003 – World Cup (bronze medal)
- 2003 – NORCECA Zone Championships (gold medal)
- 2004 – FIVB World Grand Prix (bronze medal)
- 2004 – Olympic Games (fifth place)
