= Nouran Sharaf =

Egyptian volleyball player (born 1985)

Personal information
- Nationality: Egyptian
- Born: 30 September 1985 (age 41)
- Height: 175 cm (69 in)
- Weight: 62 kg (137 lb)
- Spike: 279 cm (110 in)
- Block: 270 cm (106 in)

Volleyball information
- Number: 17 (national team)

Career
Years	Teams
2003	Ahly club, Cairo, EGY

National team
2003	Egypt

Nouran Elmagghauri Sharaf (born 30 September 1985) is an Egyptian retired volleyball player. She played for the Egypt women's national volleyball team.

She participated in the 2003 FIVB Volleyball Women's World Cup. On club level she played for Ahly, Cairo, EGY in 2003.
