= Christina Benecke =

German volleyball player (born 1974)

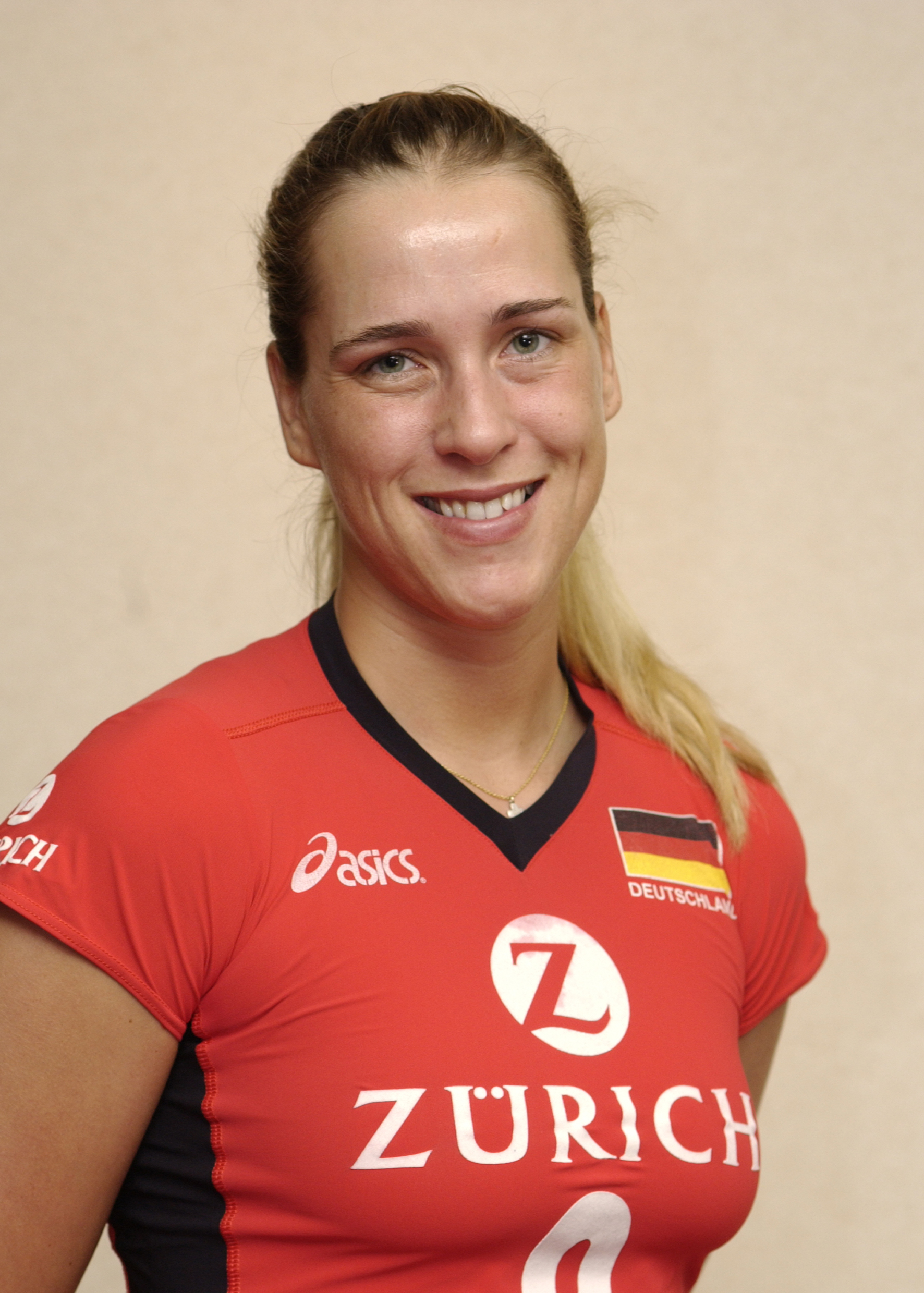

Personal information
- Full name: Christina Benecke
- Nationality: German
- Born: 14 October 1974 (age 52); Hamburg, West Germany (now Germany)
Honours
Women's volleyball
Representing Germany
European Championship
Bronze medal – third place	2003 Ankara	Team competition

Christina Benecke (born 14 October 1974) is a German volleyball player. Standing at 190 cm she played as a middle blocker for the German Women's National Team.

She represented her native country at the 2004 Summer Olympics, finishing in ninth place, and at 2003 Women's European Volleyball Championship finishing third, and the 2004 FIVB World Grand Prix.
