= Bettina Stumpf =

German volleyball player (born 1984)

Personal information
- Nationality: German
- Born: 9 June 1984 (age 42)
- Height: 184 cm (72 in)
- Weight: 85 kg (187 lb)
- Spike: 298 cm (117 in)
- Block: 284 cm (112 in)

Volleyball information
- Number: 5 (national team)

Career
Years	Teams
2004	SSV Ulm Aliud Pharma, GER

National team
2004	Germany

Bettina Stumpf (born 9 June 1984) is a German female volleyball player. She was part of the Germany women's national volleyball team.

She participated in the 2004 FIVB Volleyball World Grand Prix. On club level she played for SSV Ulm Aliud Pharma, GER in 2004.
