= Bouard Lithawat =

Thai volleyball player (born 1984)

Personal information
- Nationality: Thailand
- Born: 20 July 1984 (age 42)
- Height: 1.78 m (5 ft 10 in)
- Weight: 68 kg (150 lb)
- Spike: 293 cm (115 in)
- Block: 278 cm (109 in)

Career
Years	Teams
2004	RBAC

National team
2003-2005	Thailand

Bouard Lithawat (Thai: บัวอาด ฤทธิ์ธวัช, born 20 July 1984) is a Thai female volleyball player. She was part of the Thailand women's national volleyball team.

She participated in the 2004 FIVB Volleyball World Grand Prix. On club level she played for RBAC, Bangkok, Thailand, in 2004.
