= Agata Karczmarzewska =

Polish volleyball player (born 1978)

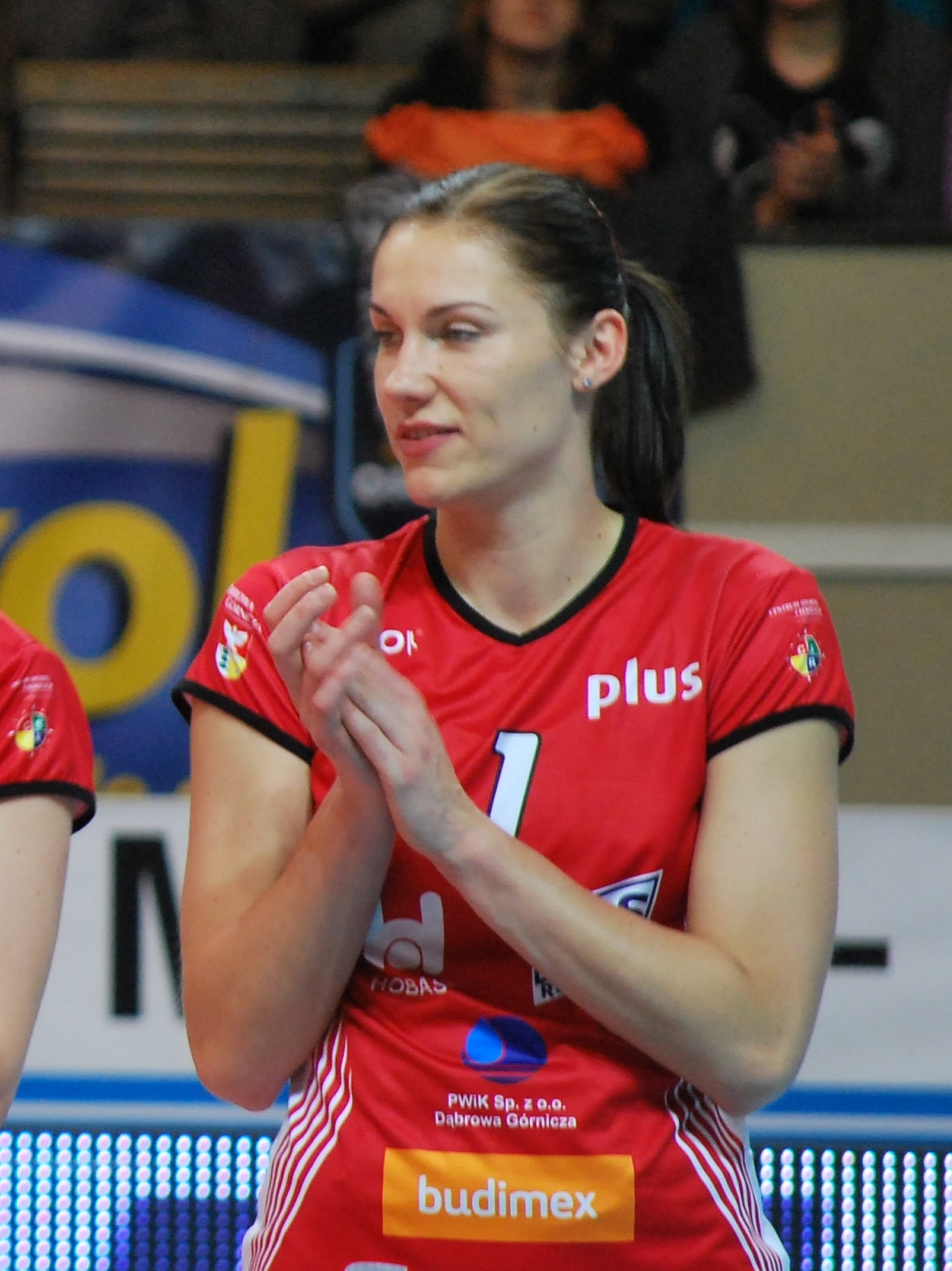
- Agata in March 2011

Personal information
- Full name: Agata Karczmarzewska-Pura
- Nationality: Polish
- Born: 27 June 1978 (age 48)
- Height: 188 cm (74 in)
- Weight: 71 kg (157 lb)
- Spike: 312 cm (123 in)
- Block: 302 cm (119 in)

Volleyball information
- Number: 3 (national team)

Career
Years	Teams
2004	Nafta Gaz, PILA, POL

National team
2004	Poland

Agata Karczmarzewska-Pura (born 27 June 1978) is a Polish female volleyball player. She was part of the Poland women's national volleyball team.

She played at the 2001 Women's European Volleyball Championship, 2004 FIVB World Grand Prix, 2008 FIVB World Grand Prix, and PTPS Nafta-Gaz Piła.
