= Sara Anzanello =

Italian volleyball player (1980–2018)

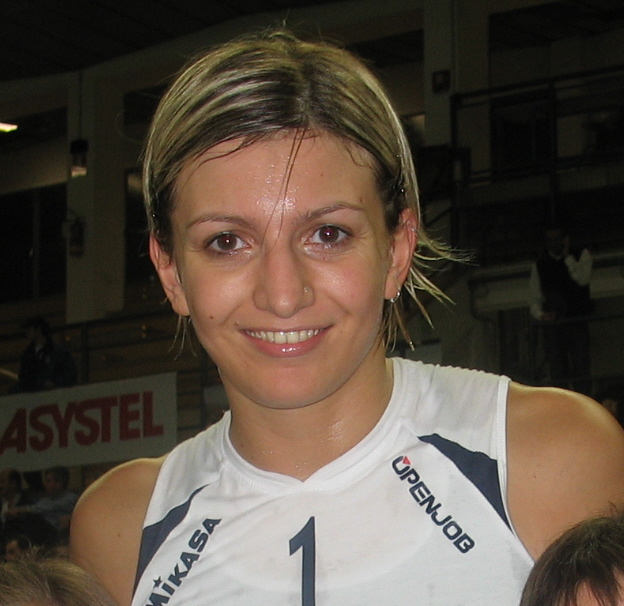

Personal information
- Born: 30 July 1980 San Donà di Piave, Province of Venice
- Died: 25 October 2018 (aged 38) Milan, Italy
Medal record
Women's volleyball
Representing Italy
World Championship
| Gold medal – first place | 2002 Germany | Team |
FIVB World Cup
| Gold medal – first place | 2007 Japan | Team |
| Gold medal – first place | 2011 Japan | Team |
FIVB World Grand Prix
| Silver medal – second place | 2004 Reggio Calabria | Team |
| Silver medal – second place | 2005 Sendai | Team |
| Bronze medal – third place | 2006 Reggio Calabria | Team |
| Bronze medal – third place | 2007 Ningbo | Team |

Sara Anzanello (30 July 1980 – 25 October 2018) was an Italian volleyball player in the middle hitter-blocker role.

== Biography ==
Anzanello was born in San Donà di Piave, province of Venice. She debuted for Italy national team in 1998, when she was 17 years old. She had a total of 203 caps for her team.

== Health and death ==
In 2013, Anzanello required a liver transplant after contracting a severe form of hepatitis in Azerbaijan. She recovered and returned to the playing field. However, in mid-2017, she was diagnosed with leukemia. She died a year later in October 2018 at age 38.

== Clubs ==
- (Italy) 1995-1998 Volley Latisana
- (Italy) 1998-1999 Club Italia
- (Italy) 1999-2001 AGIL Trecate
- (Italy) 2001-2009 Asystel Novara
- (Italy) 2009-2011 GSO Villa Cortese
- (Azerbaijan) 2011-2013 Azərreyl Baku

== Individual awards ==
- 2006 FIVB World Grand Prix "Best Blocker"
- Walk of Fame of Italian sport: 2019

Awards
| Preceded by (Cuba) Nancy Carrillo | Best Blocker of FIVB World Grand Prix; 2006 | Succeeded by (Poland) Eleonora Dziękiewicz |
