= Anna Beskova =

Russian volleyball player (born 1986)

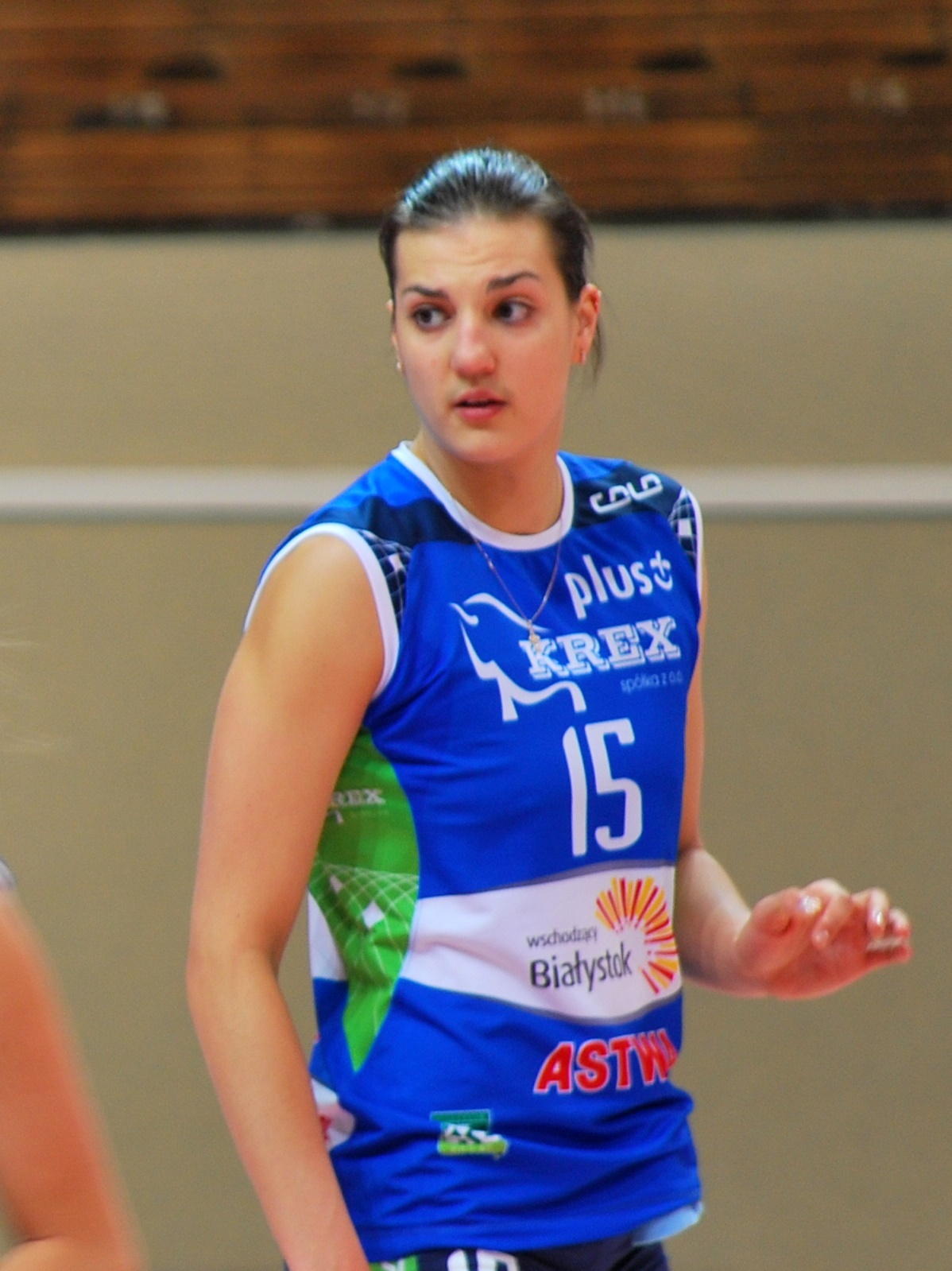

Personal information
- Nationality: Russian
- Born: 22 July 1986 (age 40)
- Height: 192 cm (76 in)
- Weight: 73 kg (161 lb)
- Spike: 305 cm (120 in)
- Block: 300 cm (118 in)

Volleyball information
- Number: 5 (national team)

Career
Years	Teams
2004	Uralochka, RUS

National team
2004	Russia

Anna Beskova (born 22 July 1986) is a Russian female volleyball player. She was part of the Russia women's national volleyball team.

She participated in the 2004 FIVB Volleyball World Grand Prix. On club level she played for Uralochka, RUS in 2004.
