= Arlene Xavier =

Brazilian volleyball player (born 1969)

Personal information
- Full name: Arlene de Queiroz Xavier
- Born: December 20, 1969 (age 56); Contagem, Minas Gerais, Brazil
- Height: 1.77 m (5 ft 10 in)
- Weight: 74 kg (163 lb)
- Spike: 299 cm (118 in)
- Block: 290 cm (114 in)

Volleyball information
- Position: Libero
- Current club: Retired

National team
1993–2007	Brazil
Honours
Women's volleyball
Representing Brazil
World Cup
Silver medal – second place	2003 Japan	Team
World Grand Prix
Gold medal – first place	2004 Reggio Calabria	Team
Gold medal – first place	2006 Reggio Calabria	Team
Pan-American Cup
Gold medal – first place	2006 San Juan	Team

Arlene de Queiroz Xavier (born December 20, 1969) is a Brazilian volleyball player. She represented Brazil at the 2004 Summer Olympics in Athens, Greece.

Xavier was named "Best Libero" at the FIVB World Grand Prix 2006 in Reggio Calabria, Italy, where the Brazilian National Team claimed the gold medal for the sixth time at the annual competition.

== Clubs ==
- (Brazil) Minas Tênis Clube (1990–1994)
- (Brazil) BCN Guarujá (1994–1996)
- (Brazil) Pinheiros (1996–1999)
- (Brazil) BCN Osasco (1999–2000)
- (Brazil) Flamengo (2000–2001)
- (Brazil) BCN Osasco (2001–2003)
- (Brazil) Minas Tênis Clube (2003–2004)
- (Brazil) Finasa Osasco (2004–2006)
- (Brazil) Pinheiros (2007–2009)
- (Brazil) Praia Clube (2009–2010)
- (Brazil) Mackenzie (2010–2011)
- (Brazil) Praia Clube (2011–2013)
- (Brazil) Minas Tênis Clube (2013–2014)
- (Brazil) Vôlei São José (2014–2015)
- (Brazil) Vôlei Cascavel (2015–2016)
- (Brazil) Vôlei Bauru (2016–2019)

== Awards ==
=== Individuals ===
- 2003 FIVB World Cup – "Best Libero"
- 2006 FIVB World Grand Prix – "Best Libero"
- 2006 Pan-American Cup – "Best Libero"

Awards
Preceded by (China) Zhang Na	Best Libero of FIVB World Grand Prix; 2006	Succeeded by (China) Zhang Xian
