= Anna Kosnyreva =

Russian volleyball player (born 1986)

Personal information
- Nationality: Russian
- Born: 10 July 1986 (age 40)
- Height: 179 cm (70 in)
- Weight: 68 kg (150 lb)
- Spike: 287 cm (113 in)
- Block: 282 cm (111 in)

Volleyball information
- Number: 6 (National Team)

Career
Years	Teams
2004	Uralochka, Russia

National team
2004	Russia
- Last updated: 25 February 2017

Anna Kosnyreva (born 10 July 1986) is a Russian female volleyball player. She was part of the Russia women's national volleyball team.

She participated in the 2004 FIVB Volleyball World Grand Prix. Russia finished in 7th place. In 2005, Kosnyreva was Russia's team captain at the under 20 World championship. At club level, Kosnyreva played for Uralochka, Russia in 2004.
