= Sherihan Abdelfattah =

Egyptian volleyball player (born 1986)

Personal information
- Nationality: Egyptian
- Born: 25 September 1986 (age 40)
- Height: 181 cm (71 in)
- Weight: 69 kg (152 lb)
- Spike: 285 cm (112 in)
- Block: 277 cm (109 in)

Volleyball information
- Number: 1 (national team)

Career
Years	Teams
2003	Ahly, Cairo, EGY

National team
2003	Egypt

Sherihan Abdelfattah (born 25 September 1986) is a retired Egyptian female volleyball player. She was part of the Egypt women's national volleyball team.

She participated in the 2003 FIVB Volleyball Women's World Cup. On club level she played for Ahly, Cairo, EGY in 2003.
