= Marco Bonitta =

Italian volleyball coach

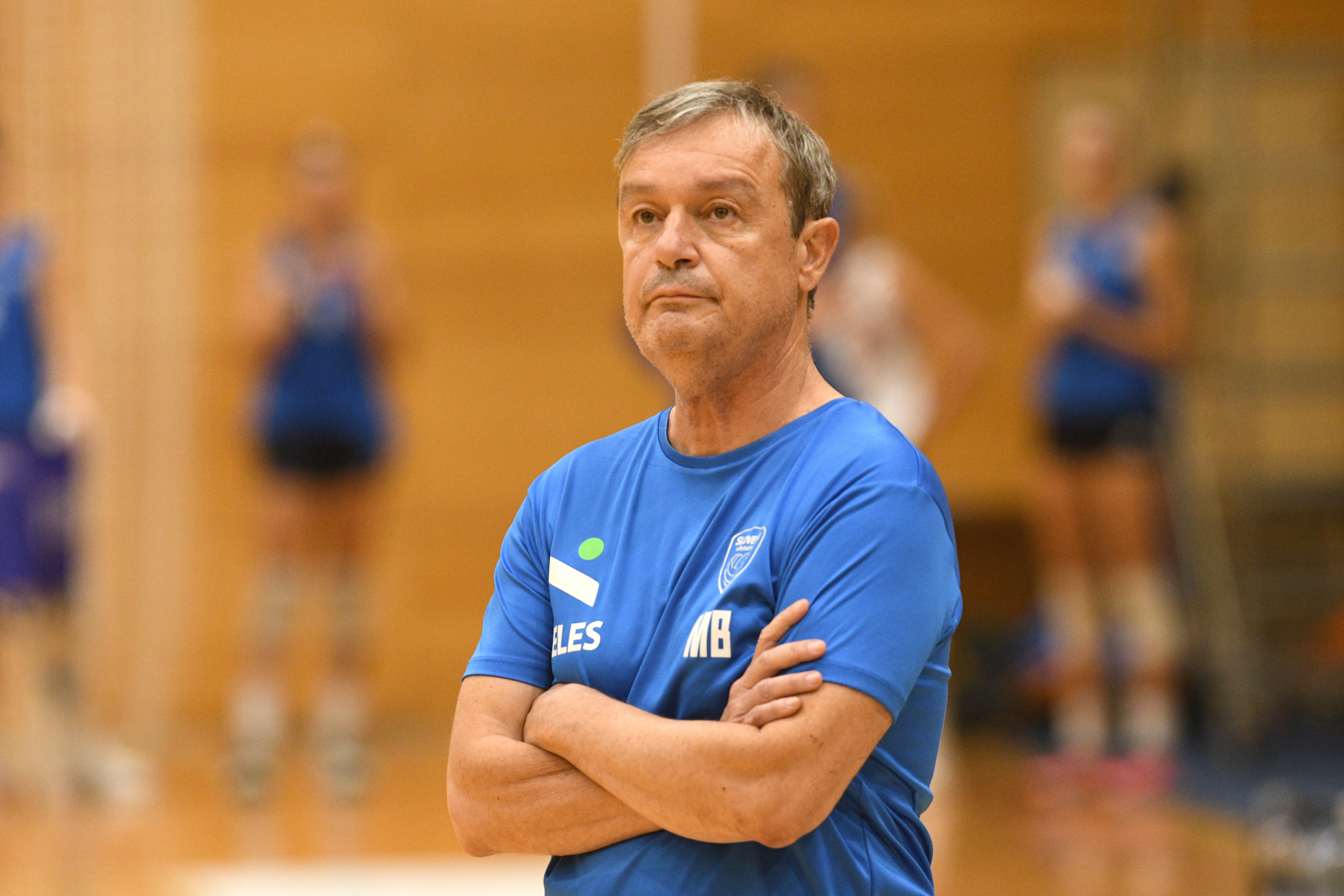

Personal information
- Born: 5 September 1963 (age 63); Ravenna, Italy

Coaching information
- Current team: Egypt
Previous teams coached
Years	Teams
1996–1997; 1997–2000; 2000–2001; 2001–2006; 2006–2007; 2007–2008; 2008; 2009–2011; 2011–2012; 2012–2013; 2013–2014; 2014–2016; 2019–2021; 2021; 2022–2023; 2022–2024; 2025–	Big Power Ravenna; Foppapedretti Bergamo; Mirabilandia Ravenna; Italy (W); Volley Cavriago; Poland (W); Stamplast Martina Franca; Volley Cavriago; Club Italia Roma; Porto Donati Ravenna; CMC Ravenna; Italy (W); Consar Ravenna; AZS Olsztyn; Slovenia (W); Consar Ravenna; Egypt
Honours
Women's volleyball
Head coach Italy
FIVB World Championship
Gold medal – first place	2002 Germany
FIVB World Grand Prix
Silver medal – second place	2004 Reggio Calabria
Silver medal – second place	2005 Sendai
Bronze medal – third place	2006 Reggio Calabria
CEV European Championship
Silver medal – second place	2001 Bulgaria
Silver medal – second place	2005 Croatia

Marco Bonitta (born 5 September 1963) is an Italian professional volleyball coach. He serves as head coach for the Egypt national team.

== Career ==
Bonitta took over the Italian national volleyball team in March 2001. He led the team to a silver medal at the 2001 European Championship, and to their first World Champion title at the 2002 World Championship. He left his post in September 2006.

In 2014, Bonitta once again became the head coach of Italy. He coached the team at the 2016 Summer Olympics held in Rio de Janeiro.

== Honours ==
- CEV European Champions Cup
  - 1998–99 – with Foppapedretti Bergamo
  - 1999–00 – with Foppapedretti Bergamo
- Domestic
  - 1997–98 Italian SuperCup, with Foppapedretti Bergamo
  - 1997–98 Italian Cup, with Foppapedretti Bergamo
  - 1997–98 Italian Championship, with Foppapedretti Bergamo
  - 1998–99 Italian SuperCup, with Foppapedretti Bergamo
  - 1998–99 Italian Championship, with Foppapedretti Bergamo
  - 1999–00 Italian SuperCup, with Foppapedretti Bergamo
- Youth national team
  - 2012 CEV U20 European Championship, with Italy

=== Individual awards ===
- 2002: Officer of the Order of Merit of the Italian Republic
