= Prim Intawong =

Thai volleyball player (born 1970)

Personal information
- Full name: Prim Intawong
- Nickname: Jane
- Nationality: Thailand
- Born: 5 October 1970 (age 56)
- Hometown: Chiang Rai, Thailand
- Height: 1.68 m (5 ft 6 in)
- Weight: 54 kg (119 lb)
- Spike: 280 cm (110 in)
- Block: 270 cm (106 in)

Volleyball information
- Position: Setter

Career
Years	Teams
2004	Aerothai

National team
1985–2000, 2003–2004	Thailand
Honours
Southeast Asian Games
Gold medal – first place	1989 Kuala Lumpur	Team
Gold medal – first place	1991 Manila	Team
Silver medal – second place	1993 Singapore	Team
Gold medal – first place	1995 Chang Mai	Team
Gold medal – first place	1997 Jakarta	Team
Gold medal – first place	2001 Kuala Lumpur	Team
Gold medal – first place	2003 Hanoi	Team

Prim Intawong (Thai: ปริม อินทวงศ์; born 5 October 1970) (former name Prim Jitwises) is a Thai female volleyball player. She was part of the Thailand women's national volleyball team.

She participated in the 2004 FIVB Volleyball World Grand Prix. On club level, she played for Aerothai, Bangkok, Thailand in 2004.

== Clubs ==
- (Thailand) Thai Namthip VC (1989)
- (Thailand) Aerothai (2004)
