= Anna Świderek =

Polish volleyball player (born 1979)

Anna Swiderek

Personal information
- Nationality: Polish
- Born: 1 April 1979 (age 47)
- Height: 184 cm (72 in)
- Weight: 66 kg (146 lb)
- Spike: 308 cm (121 in)
- Block: 296 cm (117 in)

Volleyball information
- Number: 15 (national team)

Career
Years	Teams
2004	Scavolini, Pesaro, ITA

National team
2004	Poland

Anna Swiderek (born 1 April 1979) is a Polish volleyball player. She was part of the Poland women's national volleyball team.

She participated in the 2004 FIVB Volleyball World Grand Prix. On club level she played for Scavolini, Pesaro, ITA in 2004.
