= Simona Rinieri =

Italian volleyball player

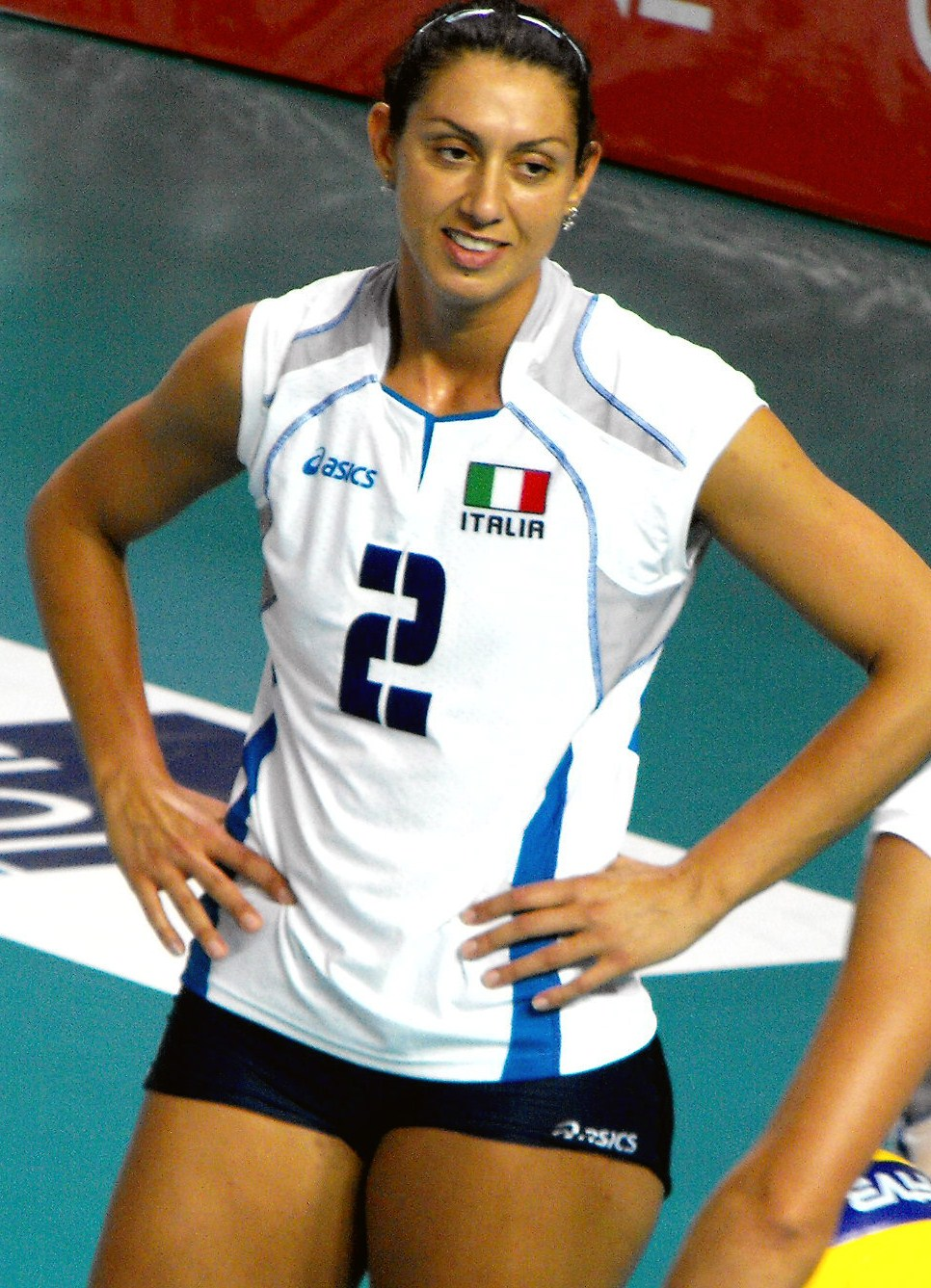

Personal information
- Full name: Simona Rinieri Dennis
- Born: 1 September 1977 (age 49); Ravenna, Italy
- Height: 190 cm (6 ft 3 in)

Volleyball information
- Position: Outside hitter
- Number: 2 (national team)
Medal record
Women's volleyball
Representing Italy
World Championship
Gold medal – first place	2002 Germany	Team
FIVB World Grand Prix
Silver medal – second place	2004 Reggio Calabria
Bronze medal – third place	2006 Reggio Calabria
European Championship
Silver medal – second place	2001 Bulgaria
Silver medal – second place	2005 Croatia
Mediterranean Games
Gold medal – first place	2009 Pescara	Team

Simona Rinieri (born 1 September 1977) is an Italian former volleyball player and two-time Olympian.

Rinieri played for Italy at the 2000 and 2004 Summer Olympics. While playing for Italy, she won the gold medal at the 2002 FIVB World Championship, the silver medal at the 2004 FIVB World Grand Prix, and the bronze medal at the 2006 FIVB World Grand Prix.

== Family ==
Rinieri married Cuban-Italian volleyball player Ángel Dennis.
