= Anastasiya Kodirova =

Russian volleyball player (born 1979)

Personal information
- Full name: Anastasiya Aleksandrovna Belikova (-Kodirova)
- Born: 22 July 1979 (age 47) Chelyabinsk, Russia
- Height: 1.92 m (6 ft 4 in)
Honours
Women's volleyball
Representing Russia
Olympic Games
Silver medal – second place	2000 Sydney	Team
World Championship
Bronze medal – third place	1998 Japan	Team
Bronze medal – third place	2002 Germany	Team
FIVB World Cup
Silver medal – second place	1999 Japan	Team
European Championship
Gold medal – first place	1997 Brno	Team
Gold medal – first place	1999 Rome–Perugia	Team
Gold medal – first place	2001 Sofia–Varna	Team

Anastasiya Aleksandrovna Kodirova (Russian: Анастасия Александровна Кодирова), née Belikova (Russian: Беликова), (born 22 July 1979, in Chelyabinsk) is a Russian volleyball player. She was a member of the national team that won the silver medal in the Sydney 2000 Olympic Games.

Awards
Preceded by (Brazil) Valeska Menezes	Best Blocker of FIVB World Grand Prix; 2003	Succeeded by (Italy) Manuela Leggeri
