= Darina Mifkova =

Italian volleyball player (born 1974)

Medal record

Women's volleyball

Representing Italy

World Championship
Gold medal – first place	2002 Germany	Team

FIVB World Grand Prix
Silver medal – second place	2004 Reggio Calabria	Team

European Championships
Silver medal – second place	2001 Bulgaria	Team

Darina Mifkova (born May 24, 1974 in Prague) is an Italian former volleyball player.

She was born in Prague, then part of Czechoslovakia, but grew up in Bergamo and later represented Italy at international level. She won the gold medal at the 2002 World Championship, held in Germany.
