= Valeska Menezes =

Brazilian volleyball player (born 1976)

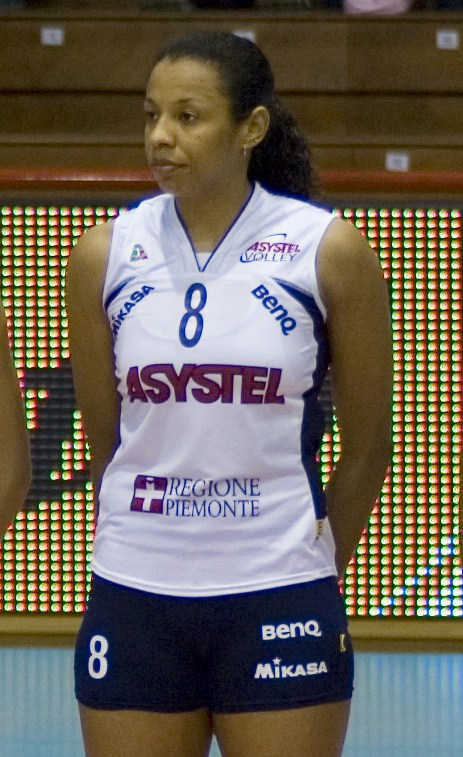

Personal information
- Full name: Valeska dos Santos Menezes
- Born: 23 April 1976 (age 50); Niterói, Brazil
- Height: 1.80 m (5 ft 11 in)
- Spike: 302 cm (119 in)
- Block: 290 cm (110 in)

Volleyball information
- Position: Middle blocker
- Current club: Curitiba Vôlei

Career
Years	Teams
1994–1997	(Brazil) Pinheiros
1997–2000	(Brazil) Rexona-Ades
2000–2001	(Brazil) Mirim Flamengo
2001–2007	(Brazil) Osasco Vôlei
2007–2008	(Italy) Asystel Novara
2008–2009	(Turkey) DYO Karşıyaka
2009–2010	(Turkey) Galatasaray Medical Park
2010–2014	(Brazil) Unilever/Rio
2014–2016	(Brazil) Vôlei Bauru
2016–2017	(Brazil) Clube Curitibano
2017–2022	(Brazil) Curitiba Vôlei

National team
2002–2008	Brazil
Honours
Women's volleyball
Representing Brazil
Olympic Games
Gold medal – first place	2008 Beijing	Team
World Cup
Silver medal – second place	2003 Japan	Team
World Grand Champions Cup
Gold medal – first place	2005 Nagoya	Team
World Grand Prix
Gold medal – first place	2004 Reggio Calabria	Team
Gold medal – first place	2005 Sendai	Team
Gold medal – first place	2006 Reggio Calabria	Team
Gold medal – first place	2008 Yokohama	Team
Final Four Cup
Gold medal – first place	2008 Fortaleza

Valeska dos Santos Menezes (born 23 April 1976; nicknamed Valeskinha) is a Brazilian volleyball player.

She represented Brazil at the 1999 FIVB Volleyball Women's World Cup, and 2004 Summer Olympics in Athens, Greece. She was named "Best Blocker" at the 2003 FIVB Women's World Cup in Japan, where the Brazilian national team claimed the silver medal.

== Awards ==
=== Individuals ===
- 2002 FIVB World Grand Prix – "Best Blocker"
- 2003 FIVB World Cup – "Best Blocker"
- 2003–04 Brazilian Superliga – "Best Blocker"
- 2004–05 Brazilian Superliga – "Best Blocker"
- 2005 South American Championship – "Most Valuable Player"
- 2005–06 Brazilian Superliga – "Best Blocker"

Awards
Preceded by (United States) Danielle Scott-Arruda	Best Blocker of FIVB World Grand Prix; 2002	Succeeded by (Russia) Anastasiya Belikova
Preceded by (Cuba) Mirka Francia	Best Blocker of FIVB World Cup; 2003	Succeeded by (Italy) Simona Gioli
