= Chen Jing (volleyball) =

Chinese volleyball player (born 1975)

Personal information
- Nationality: Chinese
- Born: September 3, 1975 (age 51); Sichuan, China

Career
Years	Teams
1992 - 2013	Sichuan

National team
1999 - 2004	China
Honours
Women's volleyball
Representing China
Olympic Games
Gold medal – first place	2004 Athens	Team
FIVB World Cup
Gold medal – first place	2003 Japan	Team
FIVB World Grand Prix
Gold medal – first place	2003 Andria	Team
Bronze medal – third place	1999 Yuxi	Team
Asian Games
Gold medal – first place	2002 Pusan	Team
Asian Championship
Gold medal – first place	1999 Tehran	Team
Gold medal – first place	2003 Tianjin	Team

Chen Jing (Chinese: 陈静; pinyin: Chén Jìng; born 3 September 1975) is a Chinese volleyball player who played for the China women's national volleyball team.

She competed in the 2000 Summer Olympics and in the 2004 Summer Olympics, and the 2004 FIVB World Grand Prix.
