= Svetlana Sourtseva =

Russian volleyball player (born 1984)

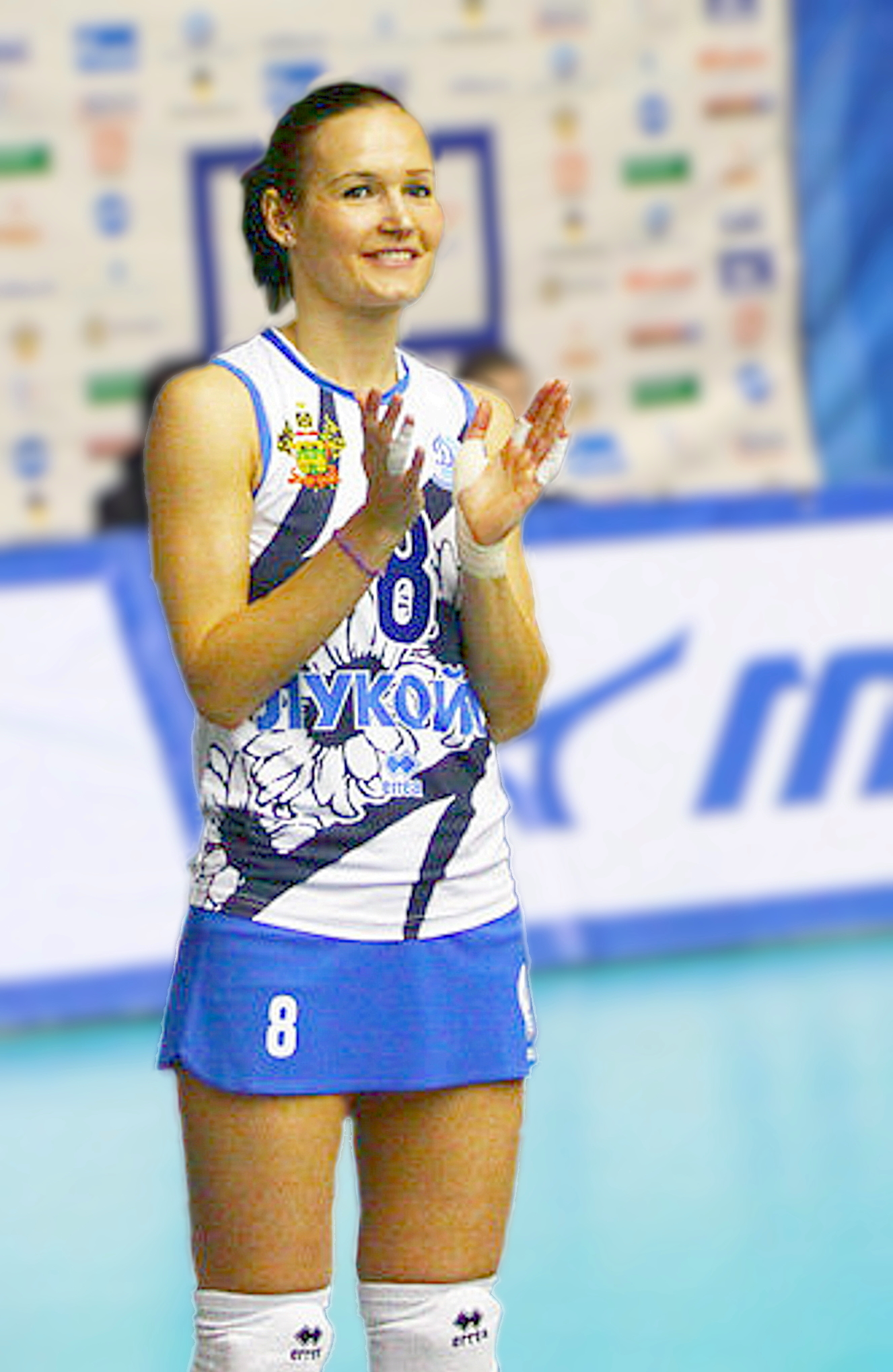

Personal information
- Nationality: Russia
- Born: Svetlana Sergueïevna Akulova; 10 April 1984 (age 42)
- Height: 1.81 m (5 ft 11 in)
- Weight: 68 kg (150 lb)
- Spike: 297 cm (117 in)
- Block: 287 cm (113 in)

National team
Russia
Honours
European Volleyball Championship
Bronze medal – third place	2007	Team competition

Svetlana Sourtseva (Светлана Сергеевна Сурцева, born Svetlana Sergueïevna Akulova; 10 April 1984 in Cheliabinsk) is a Russian volleyball player.

She played for the Russia women's national volleyball team. She participated in the 2007 Women's European Volleyball Championship, and the 2007 FIVB World Grand Prix.

== Clubs ==
Club	From	To
Avtodor-Metar	1999–2000	2000–2001
AES Balakovo	2001–2002	2007–2008
Leningradka	2008–2009	2009–2010
Dynamo-Yantar	2010–2011	2010–2011
Dinamo Krasnodar	2011–2012	2012–2013
VK Tioumen	2013–2014	2013–2014
Proton Balakovo	2014–2015	2014–2015
Zaretchie Odintsovo	October 2015	November 2015
Dinamo Krasnodar	2015–2016	…
