= Sinem Akap =

Turkish volleyball player (born 1982)

Personal information
- Nationality: Turkish
- Born: 1 January 1982 (age 44)
- Height: 187 cm (74 in)
- Weight: 71 kg (157 lb)
- Spike: 291 cm (115 in)
- Block: 284 cm (112 in)

Volleyball information
- Number: 3 (national team)

Career
Years	Teams
2003	Eczacibasi, TUR

National team
2003	Turkey

Sinem Akap (born 1 January 1982) is a Turkish retired volleyball player.

She was part of the Turkey women's national volleyball team. She participated at the 2003 Women's European Volleyball Championship, and the 2008 FIVB Volleyball World Grand Prix. On club level she played for Eczacibasi, TUR in 2003.
