= Lim Yu-jin =

South Korean volleyball player (born 1983)

Lim Yu-Jin

Personal information
- Nationality: South Korean
- Born: 24 November 1983 (age 42)
- Height: 180 cm (71 in)
- Weight: 70 kg (154 lb)
- Spike: 280 cm (110 in)
- Block: 270 cm (106 in)

Volleyball information
- Number: 19 (national team)

Career
Years	Teams
2006	Korea Highway Corp.

National team
2006	South Korea

Lim Yu-Jin (born 24 November 1983) is a South Korean female volleyball player. She was part of the South Korea women's national volleyball team.

She participated in the 2003 FIVB World Grand Prix, and the 2006 FIVB Volleyball World Grand Prix. On club level she played for Korea Highway Corp. in 2006.
