= Chen Zhonghe =

Chinese volleyball coach (born 1957)

Personal information
- Native name: 陈忠和
- Nationality: Chinese
- Born: 2 October 1957 (age 69) Zhangzhou, Fujian, China

Sport
- Sport: Volleyball
Medal record
Women's volleyball
Gold medal – first place	2003	FIVB Volleyball Women's World Cup
Gold medal – first place	2004	Olympic Games

Chen Zhonghe (Chinese: 陈忠和, born 2 October 1957 in Zhangzhou) is a Chinese former volleyball coach. He was the head coach of the Chinese women's national volleyball team from 2001 to 2009 and the man behind the gold medals of the 2003 FIVB Volleyball Women's World Cup and the 2004 Athens Olympics.

Huang Bo and Peng Yuchang starred as him in the 2020 film Leap. Chen himself was outraged by the somewhat negative portrayal and threatened to sue for defamation.
