= 2006 FIVB Volleyball World Grand Prix =

Volleyball competition held in Italy

2006 FIVB World Grand Prix
Tournament details
- Host country: Italy (Final)
- Dates: 18 August – 10 September
- Teams: 12
- Venues: 10 (in 10 host cities)

Final positions
- Champions: Brazil (6th title)
- Runners-up: Russia
- Third place: Italy
- Fourth place: Cuba

Tournament awards
- MVP: (Brazil) Sheilla Castro

The FIVB World Grand Prix 2006 was the fourteenth edition of the annual women's volleyball tournament, which is the female equivalent of the Men's Volleyball World League.

== Qualification ==
=== Asia ===
- The top four Asian teams according to the FIVB World Rankings
  - China
  - Japan
  - South Korea
  - Thailand

=== Europe ===
- European Qualification Tournament in Baku, Azerbaijan from July 26 to July 31, 2005

==== Group A ====
Pos	Team	Pld	W	L	Pts	SW	SL	SR	SPW	SPL	SPR	Qualification
1	Russia	3	2	1	5	8	4	2.000	281	259	1.085	Semifinals
2	Poland	3	2	1	5	8	5	1.600	280	263	1.065	Semifinals
3	Netherlands	3	2	1	5	7	5	1.400	275	266	1.034	
4	Romania	3	0	3	3	0	9	0.000	180	228	0.789	

Date		Score		Set 1	Set 2	Set 3	Set 4	Set 5	Total
26 Jul	Russia	2–3	Poland	25–23	19–25	25–17	24–26	10–15	103–106
26 Jul	Netherlands	3–0	Romania	26–24	25–21	25–21			76–66
27 Jul	Netherlands	1–3	Russia	27–29	25–22	19–25	22–25		93–101
27 Jul	Romania	0–3	Poland	20–25	16–25	18–25			54–75
28 Jul	Russia	3–0	Romania	27–25	25–17	25–18			77–60
28 Jul	Poland	2–3	Netherlands	25–20	19–25	20–25	25–21	10–15	99–106

==== Group B ====
Pos	Team	Pld	W	L	Pts	SW	SL	SR	SPW	SPL	SPR	Qualification
1	Azerbaijan	3	2	1	5	8	1	8.000	306	293	1.044	Semifinals
2	Germany	3	2	1	5	7	5	1.400	268	254	1.055	Semifinals
3	Turkey	3	1	2	4	6	8	0.750	312	316	0.987	
4	Bulgaria	3	1	2	4	4	7	0.571	247	270	0.915	

Date		Score		Set 1	Set 2	Set 3	Set 4	Set 5	Total
26 Jul	Germany	3–2	Turkey	23–25	19–25	25–19	25–20	15–10	107–99
26 Jul	Azerbaijan	3–1	Bulgaria	26–24	21–25	25–23	25–20		97–92
27 Jul	Bulgaria	3–1	Turkey	25–23	29–27	21–25	25–23		100–98
27 Jul	Azerbaijan	3–1	Germany	25–27	25–21	25–21	25–17		100–86
28 Jul	Germany	3–0	Bulgaria	25–15	25–22	25–18			75–55
28 Jul	Turkey	3–2	Azerbaijan	22–25	25–23	25–22	28–30	15–9	115–109

==== Semi finals ====
Date		Score		Set 1	Set 2	Set 3	Set 4	Set 5	Total
30 Jul	Russia	3–2	Poland	19–25	20–25	25–20	25–23	15–8	104–101
30 Jul	Azerbaijan	3–0	Germany	28–26	25–10	25–20			78–56

==== Third-place match ====
Date		Score		Set 1	Set 2	Set 3	Set 4	Set 5	Total
31 Jul	Poland	3–1	Germany	25–27	25–13	25–21	25–19		100–80

==== First Place Match ====
Date		Score		Set 1	Set 2	Set 3	Set 4	Set 5	Total
31 Jul	Russia	2–3	Azerbaijan	25–17	16–25	17–25	25–18	15–17	98–102

  - Azerbaijan, Russia and Poland qualified; Italy received a wild card as the host nation.

=== North and South America ===
- Pan-American Cup in Santo Domingo, Dominican Republic from June 8 to June 19, 2005
  - Cuba
  - United States
  - Dominican Republic
  - Brazil

== Preliminary round ==
=== Ranking ===
The host China and top five teams in the preliminary round advance to the final round.

Pos	Team	Pld	W	L	Pts	SW	SL	SR	SPW	SPL	SPR	Qualification
1	Brazil	9	9	0	18	27	4	6.750	765	632	1.210	Final round
2	Russia	9	8	1	17	24	12	2.000	836	736	1.136	Final round
3	China	9	8	1	17	24	9	2.667	767	700	1.096	Final round
4	Italy (Note: Qualified as hosts) (H)	9	7	2	16	22	10	2.200	763	672	1.135	Final round
5	Cuba	9	6	3	15	19	14	1.357	750	733	1.023	Final round
6	Japan	9	5	4	14	15	14	1.071	643	631	1.019	Final round
7	United States	9	4	5	13	19	18	1.056	844	840	1.005	
8	Dominican Republic	9	2	7	11	12	24	0.500	739	821	0.900	
9	South Korea	9	2	7	11	10	23	0.435	671	751	0.893	
10	Azerbaijan	9	1	8	10	16	26	0.615	887	919	0.965	
11	Thailand	9	1	8	10	7	26	0.269	690	798	0.865	
12	Poland	9	1	8	10	11	26	0.423	738	860	0.858	

(H) Host

=== First round ===
==== Group A ====
- Venue: Ariake Coliseum, Tokyo, Japan

Date		Score		Set 1	Set 2	Set 3	Set 4	Set 5	Total	Report
18 Ago	Brazil	3–0	South Korea	25–14	25–17	25–14			75–45	P2
18 Ago	Cuba	0–3	Japan	27–29	18–25	17–25			62–79	P2
19 Ago	Cuba	1–3	Brazil	19–25	27–25	20–25	21–25		87–100	P2
19 Ago	South Korea	0–3	Japan	20–25	20–25	17–25			57–75	P2
20 Ago	Cuba	3–0	South Korea	25–23	25–20	25–23			75–66	P2
20 Ago	Brazil	3–0	Japan	25–22	25–16	25–20			75–58	P2

==== Group B ====
- Venue: Hong Kong Coliseum, Hong Kong

Date		Score		Set 1	Set 2	Set 3	Set 4	Set 5	Total	Report
18 Ago	Russia	3–2	Azerbaijan	22–25	21–25	27–25	25–23	15–7	110–105	P2
18 Ago	China	3–0	Thailand	25–20	25–19	25–22			75–61	P2
19 Ago	Russia	3–1	Thailand	25–17	25–15	26–28	25–19		101–79	P2
19 Ago	China	3–2	Azerbaijan	21–25	25–23	22–25	25–21	15–13	108–107	P2
20 Ago	Azerbaijan	3–2	Thailand	20–25	22–25	25–19	25–20	16–14	108–103	P2
20 Ago	China	3–0	Russia	25–15	25–23	25–21			75–59	P2

==== Group C ====
- Venue: Łuczniczka, Bydgoszcz, Poland

Date		Score		Set 1	Set 2	Set 3	Set 4	Set 5	Total	Report
18 Ago	United States	2–3	Dominican Republic	25–21	23–25	25–19	25–27	8–15	106–107	P2
18 Ago	Poland	0–3	Italy	23–25	18–25	21–25			75–61	P2
19 Ago	Italy	3–0	Dominican Republic	25–17	25–17	25–18			101–79	P2
19 Ago	Poland	1–3	United States	24–26	22–25	25–18	21–25		108–107	P2
20 Ago	Italy	3–1	United States	25–21	27–25	18–25	25–17		108–103	P2
20 Ago	Poland	1–3	Dominican Republic	23–25	20–25	30–28	17–25		75–59	P2

=== Second round ===
==== Group D ====
- Venue: Macau Forum, Macau

Date		Score		Set 1	Set 2	Set 3	Set 4	Set 5	Total	Report
25 Ago	Brazil	3–2	Dominican Republic	25–14	22–25	20–25	25–17	15–8	107–89	P2
25 Ago	China	3–2	United States	25–27	25–22	25–22	20–25	16–14	111–110	P2
26 Ago	Brazil	3–1	United States	29–27	25–22	23–25	25–21		102–95	P2
26 Ago	China	3–1	Dominican Republic	25–22	25–20	20–25	25–22		95–89	P2
27 Ago	United States	3–1	Dominican Republic	25–22	22–25	26–24	25–16		98–87	P2
27 Ago	China	0–3	Brazil	22–25	19–25	17–25			58–75	P2

==== Group E ====
- Venue: Jamsil Indoor Gymnasium, Seoul, South Korea

Date		Score		Set 1	Set 2	Set 3	Set 4	Set 5	Total	Report
25 Ago	South Korea	1–3	Russia	15–25	18–25	25–20	20–25		78–95	P2
25 Ago	Poland	0–3	Japan	18–25	24–26	18–25			60–76	P2
26 Ago	Russia	3–2	Poland	25–16	28–30	25–16	24–26	15–6	117–94	P2
26 Ago	South Korea	0–3	Japan	22–25	15–25	19–25			56–75	P2
27 Ago	South Korea	3–2	Poland	23–25	25–10	19–25	25–22	15–9	107–91	P2
27 Ago	Russia	3–0	Japan	25–23	25–17	25–21			75–61	P2

==== Group F ====
- Venue: Taipei Municipal Gymnasium, Taipei, Taiwan

Date		Score		Set 1	Set 2	Set 3	Set 4	Set 5	Total	Report
25 Ago	Italy	3–2	Azerbaijan	25–18	25–20	22–25	23–25	15–11	110–99	P2
25 Ago	Thailand	0–3	Cuba	23–25	21–25	17–25			61–75	P2
26 Ago	Cuba	3–2	Azerbaijan	22–25	26–24	21–25	25–21	15–12	109–107	P2
26 Ago	Thailand	1–3	Italy	25–23	20–25	23–25	20–25		88–98	P2
27 Ago	Cuba	3–1	Italy	25–22	25–23	20–25	25–18		95–88	P2
27 Ago	Azerbaijan	2–3	Thailand	21–25	25–18	25–17	23–25	10–15	104–100	P2

=== Third round ===
==== Group G ====
- Venue: Beilun Gymnasium, Ningbo, China

Date		Score		Set 1	Set 2	Set 3	Set 4	Set 5	Total	Report
1 Sep	Cuba	3–2	Poland	18–25	25–27	25–15	25–16	15–9	108–92	P2
1 Sep	China	3–1	Azerbaijan	25–18	25–20	19–25	26–24		95–87	P2
2 Sep	Cuba	3–0	Azerbaijan	25–18	25–21	28–26			78–65	P2
2 Sep	China	3–0	Poland	25–22	25–15	25–14			75–51	P2
3 Sep	Poland	3–2	Azerbaijan	25–21	25–21	19–25	22–25	15–13	106–105	P2
3 Sep	China	3–0	Cuba	25–19	25–23	25–19			75–61	P2

==== Group H ====
- Venue: Nimiboot Gymnasium, Bangkok, Thailand

Date		Score		Set 1	Set 2	Set 3	Set 4	Set 5	Total	Report
1 Sep	Russia	3–2	South Korea	21–25	25–22	25–20	21–25	15–7	107–99	P2
1 Sep	Thailand	0–3	United States	27–29	15–25	25–27			67–81	P2
2 Sep	South Korea	1–3	United States	25–12	16–25	27–29	16–25		84–91	P2
2 Sep	Russia	3–0	Thailand	25–19	25–20	27–25			77–64	P2
3 Sep	United States	1–3	Russia	22–25	25–20	11–25	23–25		81–95	P2
3 Sep	Thailand	0–3	South Korea	27–29	18–25	22–25			67–79	P2

==== Group I ====
- Venue: Momotaro Arena, Okayama, Japan

Date		Score		Set 1	Set 2	Set 3	Set 4	Set 5	Total	Report
1 Sep	Brazil	3–0	Italy	25–22	25–22	30–28			80–72	P2
1 Sep	Dominican Republic	2–3	Japan	16–25	25–18	16–25	25–15	14–16	96–99	P2
2 Sep	Brazil	3–0	Dominican Republic	25–22	25–22	26–24			76–68	P2
2 Sep	Italy	3–0	Japan	25–18	25–19	25–23			75–60	P2
3 Sep	Dominican Republic	0–3	Italy	13–25	19–25	16–25			48–75	P2
3 Sep	Brazil	3–0	Japan	25–21	25–21	25–18			75–60	P2

== Final round ==
- Venue: PalaCalafiore, Reggio Calabria, Italy

=== Pool play ===
==== Group A ====
Pos	Team	Pld	W	L	Pts	SW	SL	SR	SPW	SPL	SPR	Qualification
1	Italy	2	1	1	3	4	3	1.333	170	143	1.189	Semifinals
2	Cuba	2	1	1	3	4	4	1.000	178	191	0.932	Semifinals
3	China	2	1	1	3	3	4	0.750	185	196	0.944	

Date		Score		Set 1	Set 2	Set 3	Set 4	Set 5	Total	Report
6 Sep	China	3–1	Cuba	25–19	21–25	25–23	25–16		96–83	P2
7 Sep	Cuba	3–1	Italy	26–24	19–25	25–23	25–23		95–95	P2
8 Sep	Italy	3–0	China	25–17	25–17	25–14			75–48	P2

==== Group B ====
Pos	Team	Pld	W	L	Pts	SW	SL	SR	SPW	SPL	SPR	Qualification
1	Brazil	2	2	0	4	6	1	6.000	173	136	1.272	Semifinals
2	Russia	2	1	1	3	3	3	1.000	135	139	0.971	Semifinals
3	Japan	2	0	2	2	1	6	0.167	144	177	0.814	

Date		Score		Set 1	Set 2	Set 3	Set 4	Set 5	Total	Report
6 Sep	Brazil	3–0	Russia	25–15	25–19	25–22			75–56	P2
7 Sep	Russia	3–0	Japan	25–15	25–22	29–27			79–64	P2
8 Sep	Japan	1–3	Brazil	25–23	22–25	16–25	17–25		80–98	P2

=== Final four ===
Semifinals
9 September
Italy	2
Russia	3
9 September
Cuba	0
Brazil	3

Final
10 September
Russia	1
Brazil	3
3rd place match
10 September
Italy	3
Cuba	2

==== Semifinals ====
Date		Score		Set 1	Set 2	Set 3	Set 4	Set 5	Total	Report
9 Sep	Cuba	0–3	Brazil	20–25	15–25	18–25			53–75	P2
9 Sep	Italy	2–3	Russia	25–21	25–23	23–25	15–25	10–15	98–109	P2

==== 5th place match ====
Date		Score		Set 1	Set 2	Set 3	Set 4	Set 5	Total	Report
9 Sep	China	3–0	Japan	25–20	25–13	25–18			75–51	P2

==== 3rd place match ====
Date		Score		Set 1	Set 2	Set 3	Set 4	Set 5	Total	Report
10 Sep	Italy	3–2	Cuba	25–17	25–15	23–25	23–25	15–11	111–93	P2

==== Final ====
Date		Score		Set 1	Set 2	Set 3	Set 4	Set 5	Total	Report
10 Sep	Russia	1–3	Brazil	20–25	20–25	25–23	17–25		82–98	P2

== Overall ranking ==
Place	Team
1st place, gold medalist(s)	Brazil
2nd place, silver medalist(s)	Russia
3rd place, bronze medalist(s)	Italy
4.	Cuba
5.	China
6.	Japan
7.	United States
8.	Dominican Republic
9.	South Korea
10.	Azerbaijan
11.	Thailand
12.	Poland

2006 FIVB Women's World Grand Prix winners

Brazil
6th title

Team Roster
Walewska Oliveira, Carolina Albuquerque, Marianne Steinbrecher, Caroline Gattaz, Helia Souza, Valeska Menezes, Fabiana Claudino, Welissa Gonzaga, Jaqueline Carvalho, Sheilla Castro, Arlene Xavier, Renata Colombo
Head coach
José Roberto Guimarães

== Individual awards ==
- Most valuable player:
  - Sheilla Castro (BRA)
- Best scorer:
  - Ekaterina Gamova (RUS)
- Best spiker:
  - Fabiana Claudino (BRA)
- Best blocker:
  - Sara Anzanello (ITA)
- Best server:
  - Nancy Carrillo (CUB)
- Best libero:
  - Arlene Xavier (BRA)
- Best setter:
  - Eleonora Lo Bianco (ITA)
