= Manuela Leggeri =

Italian volleyball player (born 1976)

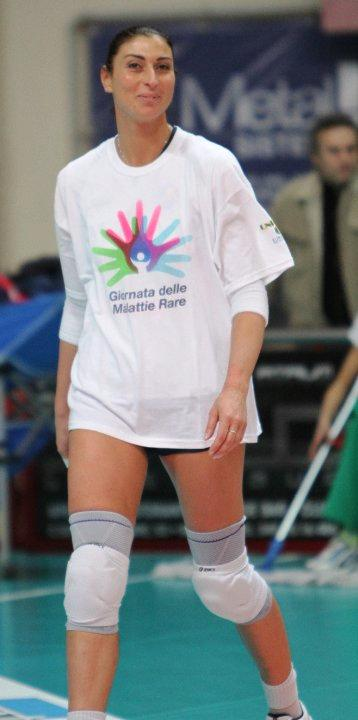

Personal information
- Born: 9 May 1976 (age 50)
Medal record
Women's volleyball
Representing Italy
World Championship
Gold medal – first place	2002 Germany	Team
FIVB World Grand Prix
Silver medal – second place	2004 Reggio Calabria	Team
European Championships
Silver medal – second place	2001 Bulgaria	Team

Manuela Leggeri (born 9 May 1976 in Sezze) is a volleyball player who represented Italy twice (2000 and 2004) at the Summer Olympics. She was a member of the Women's National Team that won the gold medal at the 2002 World Championship in Germany. Leggeri made her international debut on 29 May 1994.

== Individual awards ==
- 2004 FIVB World Grand Prix "Best Blocker"

Awards
Preceded by (Russia) Anastasiya Belikova	Best Blocker of FIVB World Grand Prix; 2004	Succeeded by (Cuba) Nancy Carrillo
