= Toshi Yoshida (volleyball) =

Japanese volleyball player and coach

Toshi Yoshida is a Japanese volleyball coach. He was the head coach of the United States women's national team from 2001 to 2004.

== Career ==
Yoshida was a volleyball player in Japan. He then served as an assistant coach of the U.S. women's national team from 1979 to 1983. From 1983 to 1997, he was the head volleyball coach at Tokyo Gukugei University.

Yoshida returned to the U.S. national team as an assistant coach from 1998 to 2000. From 2001 to 2004, he was the team's head coach, compiling a record of 87-59. He coached the team in the 2004 Summer Olympics. Later that year, he returned to Japan to coach.
