= Jorge Garbey (volleyball) =

Cuban volleyball player

Personal information
- Full name: Jorge Ignacio Garbey Castillo
- Born: 3 April 1954 (age 72); Camagüey, Cuba
- Height: 1.89 m (6 ft 2 in)

Volleyball information
- Number: 6

National team
1973–1981	Cuba
Honours
Men's volleyball
Representing Cuba
Pan American Games
Gold medal – first place	1979 Caguas	Team
Central American and Caribbean Games
Gold medal – first place	1974 Santo Domingo	Team

Jorge Garbey (born 3 April 1954) is a Cuban volleyball coach and former volleyball player. Garbey played for the Cuban men's national volleyball team at the 1980 Summer Olympics in Moscow. He won a gold medal playing with the Cuban team at the 1979 Pan American Games in Caguas.

== Coaching ==
Garbey was an assistant coach for the Cuban women's national volleyball team who helped them win gold medals at the 1992 Summer Olympics in Barcelona, the 1996 Summer Olympics in Atlanta, and the 2000 Summer Olympics in Sydney.

Garbey also coached the Dominican Republic women's national volleyball team in preparation for the 2003 Pan American Games in Santo Domingo, where they won the gold medal.
