= PalaCalafiore =

Building in Reggio Calabria, Italy

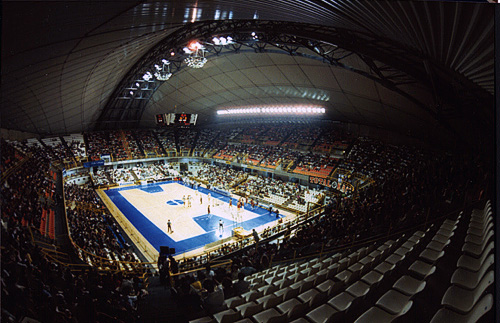
- Interactive map of PalaCalafiore
- Full name: Palazzo dello Sport Francesco Calafiore
- Former names: PalaPentimele (1990–2004)
- Address: Reggio Calabria; Italy
- Location: Parco Pentimele, Reggio Calabria, Italy
- Coordinates: 38°08′36.88″N 15°39′23.65″E
- Capacity: 8,450

Construction
- Opened: 1990

The Francesco Calafiore Sports Palace (Italian: Palazzo dello Sport Francesco Calafiore), commonly known as PalaCalafiore, is a sports arena in Reggio Calabria, Italy.

== History ==
Its modern architecture and impressive size make it one of the most important covered sports arenas in Italy; capable of holding 8,450 spectators at full capacity, it is one of the largest in Italy. There is a large outdoor parking lot.

Built in 1990, it was called PalaPentimele until 2004. In 2004, it was named after Francesco Calafiore, a sports journalist from Reggio Calabria specializing in basketball.

The venue was renovated in 2010 for that year's FIVB Men's Volleyball World Championship, and next to it, a gymnasium with a retractable roof and stands, a regulation-sized parquet playing field, fully air-conditioned and called the "warm-up area" was built.

In March 2012, the metal structure of the stage under construction, which was supposed to host a concert for Laura Pausini's Inedito World Tour 2011-2012, collapsed, crashing down onto the steps and several workers. The structure struck one of the workers, who died instantly. Investigations revealed that the PalaCalafiore has only a partial certificate of habitability; musical and sporting events have been hosted in the structure in the past with the authorization of the mayor who acted in derogation.
