= Zhang Na (volleyball) =

Chinese volleyball player (born 1980)

Personal information
- Born: 19 April 1980 (age 46) Tianjin, China
- Height: 180 cm (5 ft 11 in)

Volleyball information
- Number: 16

National team
- Years: Team
- –: China
Honours
Women's volleyball
Representing China
Olympic Games
Gold medal – first place	2004 Athens	Team
Bronze medal – third place	2008 Beijing	Team
FIVB World Cup
Gold medal – first place	2003 Japan	Team
World Grand Champions Cup
Bronze medal – third place	2005 Japan	Team
FIVB World Grand Prix
Gold medal – first place	2003 Andria	Team
Bronze medal – third place	2005 Sendai	Team
Asian Games
Gold medal – first place	2006 Doha	Team
Asian Championship
Gold medal – first place	2003 Ho Chi Minh City	Team
Gold medal – first place	2005 Taicang	Team
Asian Cup
Gold medal – first place	2008 Nakhon Ratchasima	Team

Zhang Na (simplified Chinese: 张娜; traditional Chinese: 張娜; pinyin: Zhāng Nà; born 19 April 1980 in Tianjin) is a retired female Chinese volleyball player. She was part of the gold medal winning teams at the 2003 World Cup and 2004 Olympic Games.

== Awards ==
=== Individuals ===
- 2003 Asian Women's Volleyball Championship "Best Receiver"
- 2004 Olympic Games "Best Receiver"
- 2008 Olympic Games "Best Digger"
- 2004 FIVB World Grand Prix "Best Libero"
- 2005 FIVB World Grand Prix "Best Libero"
- 2008 Asian Cup Championship "Best Receiver"

Awards
Preceded by First Award	Best Libero of FIVB World Grand Prix; 2004, 2005	Succeeded by (Brazil) Arlene Xavier
