= 2003 FIVB Volleyball Women's World Cup =

Volleyball competition held in Japan

2003 Women's World Cup
Tournament details
- Host country: Japan
- Dates: 1–15 November
- Teams: 12
- Venue: (in 7 host cities)

Final positions
- Champions: China (3rd title)
- Runners-up: Brazil
- Third place: United States

Tournament awards
- MVP: (Poland) Małgorzata Glinka

The 2003 FIVB Women's World Cup was held from 1 to 15 November 2003 in Japan. Twelve women's national teams played in cities all over Japan for the right to a fast lane ticket into the 2004 Summer Olympics.

Teams were made up as follows: hosts Japan, continental champions and vice-champions from Europe, Asia, NORCECA and South America, continental champion from Africa, and two wild-card teams nominated jointly by the FIVB and the Japan Volleyball Association. Teams played a single-round robin format (66 games overall), in two parallel groups (site A and site B). The women played in Tokyo, Kagoshima, Nagoya, Toyama, Sapporo, Sendai, and Osaka.

== Teams ==
- Japan — Host
- Egypt — African Champions
- China — Asian Champions
- Poland — European Champions
- United States — NORCECA Champions
- Brazil — South American Champions
- South Korea — Asian bronze medalists
- Turkey — European Vice-champions
- Cuba — NORCECA Vice-champions
- Argentina — South American Vice-champions
- Italy — Wild-card
- Dominican Republic — Wild-card

== Results ==
Pos	Team	Pld	W	L	Pts	SW	SL	SR	SPW	SPL	SPR
1	China	11	11	0	22	33	4	8.250	898	608	1.477
2	Brazil	11	10	1	21	31	7	4.429	932	691	1.349
3	United States	11	8	3	19	28	13	2.154	942	837	1.125
4	Italy	11	7	4	18	22	14	1.571	827	717	1.153
5	Japan	11	7	4	18	22	19	1.158	896	865	1.036
6	Cuba	11	6	5	17	24	18	1.333	946	889	1.064
7	Turkey	11	5	6	16	22	20	1.100	914	856	1.068
8	Poland	11	5	6	16	18	22	0.818	873	888	0.983
9	South Korea	11	3	8	14	15	24	0.625	805	850	0.947
10	Dominican Republic	11	3	8	14	11	26	0.423	592	868	0.682
11	Argentina	11	1	10	12	4	30	0.133	617	812	0.760
12	Egypt	11	0	11	11	0	33	0.000	464	825	0.562

All times are Japan Standard Time (UTC+09:00).

=== First round ===
==== Site A ====
Venue: Yoyogi National Gymnasium, Tokyo

Date	Time		Score		Set 1	Set 2	Set 3	Set 4	Set 5	Total	Report
1 Nov	12:00	South Korea	2–3	United States	21–25	19–25	25–21	25–22	13–15	103–108	Report
1 Nov	14:30	Italy	3–0	Egypt	25–13	25–11	25–13			75–37	Report
1 Nov	18:00	Argentina	0–3	Japan	16–25	20–25	23–25			59–75	Report
2 Nov	15:00	Italy	3–0	South Korea	25–14	25–19	25–17			75–50	Report
2 Nov	12:30	United States	3–0	Argentina	25–11	25–14	25–14			75–39	Report
2 Nov	18:00	Japan	3–0	Egypt	25–10	25–15	25–21			75–46	Report
3 Nov	15:00	United States	3–0	Italy	25–22	25–22	25–19			75–63	Report
3 Nov	12:30	Egypt	0–3	Argentina	14–25	13–25	16–25			43–75	Report
3 Nov	18:00	Japan	3–2	South Korea	23–25	25–21	26–28	25–15	15–12	114–101	Report

==== Site B ====
Venue: Kagoshima Arena, Kagoshima

Date	Time		Score		Set 1	Set 2	Set 3	Set 4	Set 5	Total	Report
1 Nov	12:05	Dominican Republic	1–3	Cuba	15–25	17–25	25–22	19–25		76–97	Report
1 Nov	14:35	Brazil	1–3	China	25–14	18–25	19–25	16–25		78–89	Report
1 Nov	18:05	Turkey	2–3	Poland	28–26	25–27	25–20	11–25	12–15	101–113	Report
2 Nov	12:35	Dominican Republic	3–1	Poland	25–21	25–17	25–27	25–21		100–86	Report
2 Nov	15:05	China	3–0	Cuba	25–20	25–17	25–19			75–56	Report
2 Nov	18:05	Brazil	3–1	Turkey	27–29	25–19	25–23	25–10		102–81	Report
3 Nov	12:35	China	3–0	Dominican Republic	25–0	25–0	25–0			75–0	Report
3 Nov	15:05	Poland	0–3	Brazil	19–25	18–25	18–25			55–75	Report
3 Nov	18:05	Cuba	2–3	Turkey	25–22	25–22	20–25	23–25	14–16	107–110	Report

=== Second round ===
==== Site A ====
Venue: Nagoya Rainbow Hall, Nagoya

Date	Time		Score		Set 1	Set 2	Set 3	Set 4	Set 5	Total	Report
5 Nov	13:30	United States	3–0	Egypt	25–16	25–17	25–20			75–53	Report
5 Nov	16:00	South Korea	3–0	Argentina	25–21	25–16	25–16			75–53	Report
5 Nov	19:00	Italy	3–1	Japan	25–22	25–19	15–25	25–11		90–77	Report
6 Nov	13:30	Egypt	0–3	South Korea	10–25	11–25	13–25			34–75	Report
6 Nov	16:00	Argentina	0–3	Italy	12–25	16–25	18–25			46–75	Report
6 Nov	19:00	Japan	0–3	United States	15–25	22–25	19–25			56–75	Report

==== Site B ====
Venue: Sendai Gymnasium, Sendai

Date	Time		Score		Set 1	Set 2	Set 3	Set 4	Set 5	Total	Report
5 Nov	12:35	Cuba	3–0	Poland	25–19	27–25	27–25			79–69	Report
5 Nov	15:05	Brazil	3–0	Dominican Republic	25–0	25–0	25–0			75–0	Report
5 Nov	18:05	China	3–1	Turkey	25–10	24–26	25–21	25–21		99–78	Report
6 Nov	12:35	Poland	0–3	China	16–25	19–25	17–25			52–75	Report
6 Nov	15:05	Turkey	3–0	Dominican Republic	25–0	25–0	25–0			75–0	Report
6 Nov	18:05	Cuba	2–3	Brazil	23–25	16–25	39–37	28–26	9–15	115–128	Report

=== Third round ===
==== Site A ====
Venue: Hokkaido Prefectural Sports Center, Sapporo

Date	Time		Score		Set 1	Set 2	Set 3	Set 4	Set 5	Total	Report
8 Nov	12:30	United States	2–3	Poland	21–25	29–31	25–22	25–21	12–15	112–114	Report
8 Nov	15:00	Italy	3–0	Dominican Republic	25–13	25–15	25–17			75–45	Report
8 Nov	18:00	Japan	3–0	Turkey	25–21	25–16	25–16			75–53	Report
9 Nov	12:30	Italy	3–0	Poland	25–15	25–17	25–22			75–54	Report
9 Nov	15:00	United States	3–2	Turkey	24–26	25–22	26–24	22–25	15–10	112–107	Report
9 Nov	18:00	Japan	3–1	Dominican Republic	25–17	23–25	25–19	26–24		99–85	Report
10 Nov	12:30	United States	3–0	Dominican Republic	25–17	25–22	25–21			75–60	Report
10 Nov	15:00	Italy	3–1	Turkey	20–25	25–18	25–21	25–20		95–84	Report
10 Nov	18:00	Japan	3–2	Poland	25–22	25–20	22–25	23–25	15–11	110–103	Report

==== Site B ====
Venue: Toyama City Gymnasium, Toyama

Date	Time		Score		Set 1	Set 2	Set 3	Set 4	Set 5	Total	Report
8 Nov	12:35	Cuba	3–0	Argentina	25–15	25–16	25–19			75–50	Report
8 Nov	15:05	Brazil	3–0	Egypt	25–14	25–8	25–18			75–40	Report
8 Nov	18:05	China	3–0	South Korea	25–10	25–19	25–14			75–43	Report
9 Nov	12:35	Cuba	3–0	Egypt	25–15	25–10	25–16			75–41	Report
9 Nov	15:05	China	3–0	Argentina	25–16	25–15	25–19			75–50	Report
9 Nov	18:05	Brazil	3–0	South Korea	25–18	25–21	26–24			76–63	Report
10 Nov	12:35	Cuba	3–2	South Korea	23–25	25–18	18–25	25–17	15–13	106–98	Report
10 Nov	15:05	Brazil	3–0	Argentina	25–18	25–19	25–12			75–49	Report
10 Nov	18:05	China	3–0	Egypt	25–11	25–16	25–11			75–38	Report

=== Fourth round ===
==== Site A ====
Venue: Namihaya Dome, Kadoma

Date	Time		Score		Set 1	Set 2	Set 3	Set 4	Set 5	Total	Report
13 Nov	12:30	Italy	0–3	Cuba	22–25	22–25	22–25			66–75	Report
13 Nov	15:00	United States	2–3	China	20–25	25–20	26–24	20–25	11–15	102–109	Report
13 Nov	18:00	Japan	0–3	Brazil	21–25	21–25	23–25			65–75	Report
14 Nov	12:30	United States	0–3	Brazil	15–25	23–25	20–25			58–75	Report
14 Nov	15:00	Italy	0–3	China	24–26	18–25	20–25			62–76	Report
14 Nov	18:00	Japan	3–2	Cuba	15–25	25–19	21–25	25–21	15–13	101–103	Report
15 Nov	15:00	Italy	1–3	Brazil	20–25	12–25	25–23	19–25		76–98	Report
15 Nov	12:30	United States	3–0	Cuba	25–23	25–18	25–17			75–58	Report
15 Nov	18:00	Japan	0–3	China	18–25	18–25	13–25			49–75	Report

==== Site B ====
Venue: Osaka Prefectural Gymnasium, Osaka

Date	Time		Score		Set 1	Set 2	Set 3	Set 4	Set 5	Total	Report
13 Nov	12:35	Dominican Republic	0–3	South Korea	20–25	21–25	15–25			56–75	Report
13 Nov	15:05	Poland	3–0	Argentina	25–16	25–18	25–21			75–55	Report
13 Nov	18:05	Turkey	3–0	Egypt	25–20	25–15	25–8			75–43	Report
14 Nov	12:35	Poland	3–0	South Korea	25–19	27–25	25–21			77–65	Report
14 Nov	15:05	Turkey	3–0	Argentina	25–14	25–18	25–21			75–53	Report
14 Nov	18:05	Dominican Republic	3–0	Egypt	25–14	25–15	25–19			75–48	Report
15 Nov	12:35	Turkey	3–0	South Korea	25–22	25–18	25–17			75–57	Report
15 Nov	14:35	Dominican Republic	3–1	Argentina	25–17	25–22	18–25	26–24		94–88	Report
15 Nov	17:05	Poland	3–0	Egypt	25–16	25–15	25–10			75–41	Report

== Final standing ==
Rank	Team
1st place, gold medalist(s)	China
2nd place, silver medalist(s)	Brazil
3rd place, bronze medalist(s)	United States
4	Italy
5	Japan
6	Cuba
7	Turkey
8	Poland
9	South Korea
10	Dominican Republic
11	Argentina
12	Egypt

Qualified for the 2004 Summer Olympics

2003 Women's World Cup champions

China
3rd title

Team roster
Feng Kun (c), Yang Hao, Liu Yanan, Li Shan, Zhou Suhong, Zhao Ruirui, Zhang Yuehong, Chen Jing, Song Nina, Wang Lina, Zhang Na, Zhang Ping
Head coach
Chen Zhonghe

== Awards ==
- Most valuable player
  (Poland) Małgorzata Glinka
- Best scorer
  (Poland) Małgorzata Glinka
- Best spiker
  (China) Zhao Ruirui
- Best blocker
  (Brazil) Valeska Menezes
- Best server
  (Cuba) Zoila Barros
- Best receiver
  (China) Zhou Suhong
- Best libero
  (Brazil) Arlene Xavier
- Best setter
  (Brazil) Fernanda Venturini
- Special award
  (Japan) Yoshie Takeshita
