= 2004 FIVB Volleyball World Grand Prix =

International women's volleyball tournament

2004 FIVB World Grand Prix
Tournament details
- Host country: Italy (Final)
- Dates: 24 June – 17 July
- Teams: 12
- Venues: 10 (in 10 host cities)

Final positions
- Champions: Brazil (4th title)
- Runners-up: Italy
- Third place: United States
- Fourth place: Cuba

Tournament awards
- MVP: (United States) Logan Tom

The FIVB World Grand Prix 2004 was the twelfth edition of the annual women's volleyball tournament, which is the female equivalent of the Men's Volleyball World League. The 2004 edition was played by twelve countries from July 9 to August 1, 2004, with the final round held in Reggio Calabria, Italy. Hosts Italy and the top five ranked teams after the preliminary rounds qualified for the last round.

== Qualification ==
=== Asia ===
- The top four Asian teams according to the FIVB World Rankings
  - China
  - Japan
  - South Korea
  - Thailand

=== Europe ===
- European Qualification Tournament in Piła, Poland from August 26 to August 31, 2003

Pos	Team	Pld	W	L	Pts	SW	SL	SR	SPW	SPL	SPR	Qualification
1	Russia	5	4	1	9	14	6	2.333	459	413	1.111	Qualified for FIVB Grand Prix 2004
2	Poland	5	4	1	9	12	7	1.714	428	390	1.097	Qualified for FIVB Grand Prix 2004
3	Germany	5	3	2	8	11	8	1.375	438	403	1.087	Qualified for FIVB Grand Prix 2004
4	Netherlands	5	3	2	8	11	8	1.375	409	411	0.995	
5	Bulgaria	5	1	4	6	6	12	0.500	384	406	0.946	
6	Greece	5	0	5	5	2	15	0.133	332	427	0.778	

Date		Score		Set 1	Set 2	Set 3	Set 4	Set 5	Total
26 Ago	Netherlands	0–3	Russia	19–25	19–25	20–25			58–75
26 Ago	Greece	0–3	Bulgaria	19–25	19–25	16–25			54–75
26 Ago	Poland	0–3	Germany	20–25	16–25	19–25			55–75
27 Ago	Russia	3–1	Greece	28–26	25–20	23–25	25–20		101–91
27 Ago	Germany	3–1	Bulgaria	25–21	25–18	18–25	25–23		93–87
27 Ago	Poland	3–2	Netherlands	25–27	25–17	22–25	25–22	15–11	112–102
28 Ago	Bulgaria	2–3	Russia	22–25	25–21	13–25	25–19	7–15	92–105
28 Ago	Netherlands	3–2	Germany	25–22	25–22	18–25	14–25	15–12	97–106
28 Ago	Greece	0–3	Poland	20–25	17–25	8–25			45–75
30 Ago	Germany	0–3	Russia	21–25	17–25	25–27			63–77
30 Ago	Netherlands	3–0	Greece	25–17	25–16	25–22			75–55
30 Ago	Poland	3–0	Bulgaria	25–22	25–20	27–25			77–67
31 Ago	Greece	1–3	Germany	25–22	16–25	27–29	19–25		87–101
31 Ago	Bulgaria	0–3	Netherlands	22–25	16–25	25–27			63–77
31 Ago	Russia	2–3	Poland	19–25	25–23	19–25	25–21	13–15	101–109

=== North and South America ===
- Pan-American Cup in Coahuila and Saltillo, Mexico from June 30 to July 5, 2003
  - United States
  - Dominican Republic
  - Cuba
  - Brazil

== Preliminary rounds ==
=== Ranking ===
The host Italy and top five teams in the preliminary round advance to the final round.

Pos	Team	Pld	W	L	Pts	SW	SL	SR	SPW	SPL	SPR	Qualification
1	Brazil	9	9	0	18	27	3	9.000	740	569	1.301	Final round
2	Cuba	9	8	1	17	24	10	2.400	797	685	1.164	Final round
3	China	9	7	2	16	23	10	2.300	767	686	1.118	Final round
4	United States	9	6	3	15	24	14	1.714	844	753	1.121	Final round
5	Italy (Note: Qualified as hosts) (H)	9	6	3	15	21	15	1.400	823	774	1.063	Final round
6	Germany	9	5	4	14	17	18	0.944	753	772	0.975	Final round
7	Russia	9	4	5	13	20	17	1.176	820	799	1.026	
8	Poland	9	4	5	13	14	18	0.778	687	731	0.940	
9	Japan	9	2	7	11	13	23	0.565	747	856	0.873	
10	Thailand	9	1	8	10	8	26	0.308	663	809	0.820	
11	South Korea	9	1	8	10	7	24	0.292	646	732	0.883	
12	Dominican Republic	9	1	8	10	5	25	0.200	612	733	0.835	

(H) Host

=== First round ===
==== Group A ====
- Venue: Nimiboot Gymnasium, Bangkok, Thailand

Date		Score		Set 1	Set 2	Set 3	Set 4	Set 5	Total	Report
9 Jul	Thailand	0–3	Cuba	17–25	19–25	22–25			58–75	P2
9 Jul	United States	3–0	South Korea	28–26	25–13	25–22			93–80	P2
10 Jul	South Korea	2–3	Thailand	28–30	25–19	25–19	21–25	8–15	99–81	P2
10 Jul	Cuba	3–2	United States	23–25	25–17	22–25	25–22	15–13	101–108	P2
11 Jul	Thailand	0–3	United States	20–25	18–25	12–25			99–76	P2
11 Jul	Cuba	3–0	South Korea	25–18	25–16	25–17			79–67	P2

==== Group B ====
- Venue: Miao Li County Dome, Miaoli, Taiwan

Date		Score		Set 1	Set 2	Set 3	Set 4	Set 5	Total	Report
9 Jul	Brazil	3–0	Dominican Republic	25–20	25–23	25–16			75–59	P2
9 Jul	China	3–0	Germany	25–19	25–22	25–15			75–56	P2
10 Jul	Brazil	3–1	Germany	17–25	25–13	25–9	25–18		92–65	P2
10 Jul	China	3–0	Dominican Republic	25–20	26–24	25–18			76–62	P2
11 Jul	Dominican Republic	0–3	Germany	21–25	18–25	20–25			59–75	P2
11 Jul	China	1–3	Brazil	25–27	25–23	18–25	18–25		86–100	P2

==== Group C ====
- Venue: Todoriki Arena, Kawasaki, Japan

Date		Score		Set 1	Set 2	Set 3	Set 4	Set 5	Total	Report
9 Jul	Poland	0–3	Russia	12–25	22–25	17–25			51–75	P2
9 Jul	Japan	1–3	Italy	25–18	20–25	20–25	19–25		84–93	P2
10 Jul	Russia	2–3	Italy	20–25	17–25	25–22	25–16	10–15	97–103	P2
10 Jul	Japan	2–3	Poland	25–22	16–25	14–25	30–28	11–15	96–115	P2
11 Jul	Italy	3–0	Poland	25–15	25–21	25–22			75–58	P2
11 Jul	Japan	1–3	Russia	22–25	25–21	20–25	23–25		90–96	P2

=== Second round ===
==== Group D ====
- Venue: Philsport Arena, Manila, Philippines

Date		Score		Set 1	Set 2	Set 3	Set 4	Set 5	Total	Report
16 Jul	Brazil	3–0	Dominican Republic	25–16	25–17	25–19			75–52	P2
16 Jul	South Korea	0–3	Poland	21–25	22–25	21–25			64–75	P2
17 Jul	South Korea	3–0	Dominican Republic	25–19	25–17	25–14			75–50	P2
17 Jul	Brazil	3–0	Poland	25–14	25–22	25–20			75–56	P2
18 Jul	Poland	1–3	Dominican Republic	13–25	26–28	25–18	20–25		84–96	P2
18 Jul	Brazil	3–0	South Korea	25–22	25–15	25–19			75–56	P2

==== Group E ====
- Venue: Hong Kong Coliseum, Hong Kong

Date		Score		Set 1	Set 2	Set 3	Set 4	Set 5	Total	Report
16 Jul	Italy	2–3	United States	20–25	25–17	25–18	22–25	15–17	107–102	P2
16 Jul	China	3–0	Thailand	25–19	25–20	25–9			75–48	P2
17 Jul	Italy	3–1	Thailand	25–17	27–25	19–25	25–22		96–89	P2
17 Jul	China	3–2	United States	20–25	28–26	16–25	25–20	15–9	104–105	P2
18 Jul	United States	3–0	Thailand	25–19	25–14	25–20			75–53	P2
18 Jul	China	3–1	Italy	17–25	25–21	25–23	26–24		93–93	P2

==== Group F ====
- Venue: Istora, Jakarta, Indonesia

Date		Score		Set 1	Set 2	Set 3	Set 4	Set 5	Total	Report
16 Jul	Russia	1–3	Japan	25–12	20–25	19–25	25–27		89–89	P2
16 Jul	Cuba	3–1	Germany	25–19	25–16	18–25	25–20		93–80	P2
17 Jul	Germany	3–1	Japan	24–26	25–17	25–19	25–19		99–81	P2
17 Jul	Russia	2–3	Cuba	25–22	20–25	25–21	21–25	10–15	101–108	P2
18 Jul	Cuba	3–1	Japan	24–26	25–15	25–13	25–22		99–76	P2
18 Jul	Russia	3–0	Germany	25–22	29–27	25–18			79–67	P2

=== Third round ===
==== Group G ====
- Venue: Stadthalle Rostock, Rostock, Germany

Date		Score		Set 1	Set 2	Set 3	Set 4	Set 5	Total	Report
22 Jul	Russia	1–3	United States	13–25	25–21	21–25	15–25		74–96	P2
22 Jul	Germany	3–1	Thailand	25–14	25–20	23–25	25–22		98–81	P2
23 Jul	United States	3–2	Thailand	25–17	25–20	22–25	22–25	15–5	109–92	P2
23 Jul	Germany	3–2	Russia	25–18	16–25	27–29	28–26	15–12	111–110	P2
24 Jul	Russia	3–1	Thailand	22–25	25–17	27–25	25–17		99–84	P2
24 Jul	Germany	3–2	United States	25–23	21–25	16–25	25–17	15–12	102–102	P2

==== Group H ====
- Venue: Hong San Huan, Hefei, China

Date		Score		Set 1	Set 2	Set 3	Set 4	Set 5	Total	Report
22 Jul	Italy	0–3	Poland	22–25	23–25	18–25			63–75	P2
22 Jul	China	3–0	Dominican Republic	25–11	25–21	25–22			75–54	P2
23 Jul	Italy	3–1	Dominican Republic	25–20	23–25	29–27	25–19		102–91	P2
23 Jul	China	3–1	Poland	25–19	25–18	23–25	25–15		98–77	P2
24 Jul	Poland	3–1	Dominican Republic	21–25	25–20	25–22	25–22		96–89	P2
24 Jul	China	1–3	Italy	25–16	19–25	21–25	20–25		85–91	P2

==== Group I ====
- Venue: Halla Gymnasium, Jeju, South Korea

Date		Score		Set 1	Set 2	Set 3	Set 4	Set 5	Total	Report
22 Jul	South Korea	1–3	Cuba	25–21	23–25	14–25	22–25		84–96	P2
22 Jul	Brazil	3–1	Japan	25–13	25–17	22–25	25–19		97–74	P2
23 Jul	South Korea	0–3	Brazil	18–25	20–25	17–25			55–75	P2
23 Jul	Cuba	3–0	Japan	25–21	25–14	25–22			75–57	P2
24 Jul	Brazil	3–0	Cuba	25–20	26–24	25–22			76–66	P2
24 Jul	South Korea	1–3	Japan	27–29	19–25	25–21	22–25		93–100	P2

== Final round ==
- Venue: PalaCalafiore, Reggio Calabria, Italy

=== Pool play ===
==== Group A ====
Pos	Team	Pld	W	L	Pts	SW	SL	SR	SPW	SPL	SPR	Qualification
1	United States	2	1	1	3	4	3	1.333	164	158	1.038	Semifinals
2	Italy	2	1	1	3	4	4	1.000	186	188	0.989	Semifinals
3	China	2	1	1	3	3	4	0.750	160	164	0.976	

Date		Score		Set 1	Set 2	Set 3	Set 4	Set 5	Total	Report
28 Jul	Italy	1–3	China	20–25	23–25	26–24	20–25		89–99	P2
29 Jul	China	0–3	United States	23–25	18–25	20–25			61–75	P2
30 Jul	United States	1–3	Italy	22–25	23–25	25–22	19–25		89–97	P2

==== Group B ====
Pos	Team	Pld	W	L	Pts	SW	SL	SR	SPW	SPL	SPR	Qualification
1	Cuba	2	2	0	4	6	2	3.000	182	167	1.090	Semifinals
2	Brazil	2	1	1	3	5	4	1.250	200	172	1.163	Semifinals
3	Germany	2	0	2	2	1	6	0.167	127	170	0.747	

Date		Score		Set 1	Set 2	Set 3	Set 4	Set 5	Total	Report
28 Jul	Brazil	2–3	Cuba	25–20	24–26	25–21	19–25	12–15	105–107	P2
29 Jul	Cuba	3–0	Germany	25–20	25–21	25–21			75–62	P2
30 Jul	Germany	1–3	Brazil	15–25	25–20	16–25	9–25		65–95	P2

=== Final four ===
Semifinals
31 July
United States	2
Brazil	3
31 July
Italy	3
Cuba	1

Final
1 August
Brazil	3
Italy	1
3rd place match
1 August
United States	3
Cuba	0

==== Semifinals ====
Date		Score		Set 1	Set 2	Set 3	Set 4	Set 5	Total	Report
31 Jul	United States	2–3	Brazil	18–25	25–19	23–25	25–21	17–19	108–109	P2
31 Jul	Italy	3–1	Cuba	25–21	26–28	25–22	27–25		103–96	P2

==== 5th place match ====
Date		Score		Set 1	Set 2	Set 3	Set 4	Set 5	Total	Report
1 Ago	China	3–2	Germany	25–15	23–25	30–32	25–14	16–14	119–100	P2

==== 3rd place match ====
Date		Score		Set 1	Set 2	Set 3	Set 4	Set 5	Total	Report
1 Ago	United States	3–0	Cuba	25–20	25–22	25–16			75–58	P2

==== Final ====
Date		Score		Set 1	Set 2	Set 3	Set 4	Set 5	Total	Report
1 Ago	Brazil	3–1	Italy	25–19	25–19	24–26	25–19		99–83	P2

== Overall ranking ==
Place	Team
1st place, gold medalist(s)	Brazil
2nd place, silver medalist(s)	Italy
3rd place, bronze medalist(s)	United States
4.	Cuba
5.	China
6.	Germany
7.	Russia
8.	Poland
9.	Japan
10.	Thailand
11.	South Korea
12.	Dominican Republic

2004 FIVB Women's World Grand Prix winners

Brazil
Fourth title

Team Roster
Walewska Oliveira, Elisângela Oliveira, Erika Coimbra, Marianne Steinbrecher, Helia Souza, Valeska Menezes, Welissa Gonzaga, Virna Dias, Ana Chagas, Fernanda Venturini, Arlene Xavier, Fabiana Claudino
Head coach
José Roberto Guimarães

== Individual awards ==
- Most valuable player:
  - Logan Tom (USA)
- Best scorer:
  - Logan Tom (USA)
- Best spiker:
  - Yumilka Ruiz (CUB)
- Best blocker:
  - Manuela Leggeri (ITA)
- Best server:
  - Logan Tom (USA)
- Best setter:
  - Fernanda Venturini (BRA)
- Best libero:
  - Zhang Na (CHN)
- Fair play award:
  - Francesca Piccinini (ITA)
- Most popular player:
  - Paola Cardullo (ITA)

== Dream Team ==
- Setter:
  - Fernanda Venturini (BRA)
- Middle Blocker:
  - Walewska Oliveira (BRA)
  - Zoila Barros (CUB)
- Outside hitters:
  - Logan Tom (USA)
  - Yang Hao (CHN)
- Opposite hitter:
  - Marianne Steinbrecher (BRA)
