= Volleyball at the 2014 Asian Games =

- Venue: Songnim Gymnasium; Sangnoksu Gymnasium
- Dates: 20 September – 3 October 2014
- Competitors: 299 from 16 nations

Volleyball at the 2014 Asian Games was held in Incheon, South Korea from September 20 to October 3, 2014. In this tournament, 16 teams played in the men's competition, and 9 teams participated in the women's competition. All matches were played at the Songnim Gymnasium and the Ansan Sangnoksu Gymnasium.

== Schedule ==
P	Preliminary round	S	Second round	C	Classification	¼	Quarterfinals	½	Semifinals	F	Finals

Event↓/Date →	20th Sat	21st Sun	22nd Mon	23rd Tue	24th Wed	25th Thu	26th Fri	27th Sat	28th Sun	29th Mon	30th Tue	1st Wed	2nd Thu	3rd Fri
Men	P	P	P	P	P	P	P	P	S	S	C	¼	½	F
Women	P	P	P	P	P	P	S	¼			½		F	

== Medalists ==
Event	Gold	Silver	Bronze
Men	Iran; Shahram Mahmoudi; Milad Ebadipour; Saeid Marouf; Farhad Ghaemi; Mohammad Mousavi; Pouria Fayazi; Farhad Zarif; Adel Gholami; Amir Ghafour; Mojtaba Mirzajanpour; Mehdi Mahdavi; Armin Tashakkori	Japan; Kunihiro Shimizu; Shohei Uchiyama; Yu Koshikawa; Ryusuke Tsubakiyama; Masahiro Yanagida; Akihiro Yamauchi; Hideomi Fukatsu; Yuki Ishikawa; Takashi Dekita; Takeshi Nagano; Yuta Yoneyama; Yamato Fushimi	South Korea; Song Myung-geun; Han Sun-soo; Shin Yung-suk; Lee Min-gyu; Park Sang-ha; Kwak Seung-suk; Bu Yong-chan; Choi Min-ho; Jeon Kwang-in; Park Chul-woo; Seo Jae-duck; Jeong Min-su
Women	South Korea; Lee Hyo-hee; Kim Hee-jin; Kim Hae-ran; Lee Jae-yeong; Nam Jie-youn; Lee Da-yeong; Kim Yeon-koung; Han Song-yi; Park Jeong-ah; Yang Hyo-jin; Bae Yoo-na; Baek Mok-hwa	China; Qiao Ting; Yao Di; Yin Na; Wang Qian; Ding Xia; Yan Ni; Zhang Changning; Li Jing; Zhang Xiaoya; Liu Yanhan; Huang Liuyan; Wang Qi	Thailand; Piyanut Pannoy; Em-orn Phanusit; Thatdao Nuekjang; Pleumjit Thinkaow; Onuma Sittirak; Khatthalee Pinsuwan; Wilavan Apinyapong; Tapaphaipun Chaisri; Nootsara Tomkom; Malika Kanthong; Kaewkalaya Kamulthala; Parinya Pankaew

== Medal table ==
Rank	Nation	Gold	Silver	Bronze	Total
1	South Korea (KOR)	1	0	1	2
2	Iran (IRI)	1	0	0	1
3	China (CHN)	0	1	0	1
3	Japan (JPN)	0	1	0	1
5	Thailand (THA)	0	0	1	1
Totals (5 entries)		2	2	2	6

== Draw ==
The draw ceremony for the team sports was held on 21 August 2014 at Incheon.

=== Men ===
The teams were distributed according to their position at the 2010 Asian Games using the serpentine system for their distribution.

Group A

- South Korea (Host)
- Qatar (8)
- Kazakhstan
- Chinese Taipei

Group B

- Japan (1)
- Saudi Arabia (7)
- Pakistan
- Kuwait

Group C

- Iran (2)
- India (6)
- Maldives
- Hong Kong

Group D

- Thailand (4)
- China (5)
- Turkmenistan
- Myanmar

=== Women ===
The teams were distributed according to their position at the 2010 Asian Games using the serpentine system for their distribution.

Group A

- South Korea (Host)
- Thailand (4)
- India
- Japan

Group B

- China (1)
- Kazakhstan (3)
- Maldives
- Chinese Taipei
- Hong Kong

== Final standing ==
=== Men ===
Rank	Team	Pld	W	L
1st place, gold medalist(s)	Iran	8	8	0
2nd place, silver medalist(s)	Japan	8	7	1
3rd place, bronze medalist(s)	South Korea	8	6	2
4	China	8	5	3
5	India	8	4	4
6	Qatar	8	4	4
7	Thailand	8	4	4
8	Kuwait	8	2	6
9	Chinese Taipei	7	5	2
10	Kazakhstan	7	3	4
11	Pakistan	7	3	4
12	Saudi Arabia	7	2	5
13	Turkmenistan	7	3	4
14	Myanmar	7	2	5
15	Hong Kong	7	2	5
16	Maldives	7	0	7

=== Women ===
Rank	Team	Pld	W	L
1st place, gold medalist(s)	South Korea	6	6	0
2nd place, silver medalist(s)	China	7	6	1
3rd place, bronze medalist(s)	Thailand	6	4	2
4	Japan	6	2	4
5	Chinese Taipei	7	5	2
6	Kazakhstan	7	3	4
7	Hong Kong	7	2	5
8	India	7	1	6
9	Maldives	5	0	5
