= Volleyball at the 2014 Asian Games – Women's tournament =

Women at the 2014 Asian Games
- Venue: Sangnoksu Gymnasium; Songnim Gymnasium
- Date: 20 September – 2 October 2014
- Competitors: 108 from 9 nations

Medalists
gold medal	South Korea
silver medal	China
bronze medal	Thailand

The 2014 Women's Asian Games Volleyball Tournament was the 14th edition of the event, organized by the Asian governing body, the AVC. It was held in Incheon (Songnim Gymnasium) and Ansan (Sangnoksu Gymnasium), South Korea from 20 September to 2 October 2014.

== Squads ==
China	Chinese Taipei	Hong Kong	India
Qiao Ting; Yao Di; Yin Na; Wang Qian; Ding Xia; Yan Ni; Zhang Changning; Li Jing; Zhang Xiaoya; Liu Yanhan; Huang Liuyan; Wang Qi	Chang Yu-chia; Chen Yi-ju; Ho Yen-chih; Yang Yi-chen; Chang Li-wen; Chen Wan-ting; Yang Meng-hua; Wen I-tzu; Lee Tzu-ying; Tseng Wan-ling; Chang Chen-yin; Chen Tzu-ya	Lam Mei; Fong Sze Man; Tsang Sze Nga; Yeung Sau Mei; Koo Yung Yung; Lo Ka Yan; Fung Tsz Yan; Lee Pui Shan; Thyllis Law; Lam Yee Ting; Tsui Ka Yee; Helen Ip	Priyanka Khedkar; Rekha Sreesailam; Anusri Ghosh; M. S. Poornima; Soumya Vengadan; P. V. Sheeba; Tiji Raju; Nirmal Tanwar Bhati; Terin Antony; Preeti Singh; Nittoor Srutimol; P. P. Reshma
Japan	Kazakhstan	Maldives	South Korea
Yuko Suzuki; Kanami Tashiro; Rika Nomoto; Haruyo Shimamura; Mari Horikawa; Miku Torigoe; Saori Takahashi; Riho Otake; Nao Muranaga; Nozomi Ito; Arisa Inoue; Nanaka Sakamoto	Yelena Gordeyeva; Irina Chumak; Valeriya Rylova; Natalya Akilova; Yekaterina Razorenkova; Irina Shenberger; Regina Danilova; Anastassiya Rostovchshikova; Ainagul Aizharikhova; Aliya Batkuldina; Ardak Maratova; Anastassiya Kolomoyets	Mariyam Azeefa; Mariyam Haleem; Aminath Areesha; Hawwa Rashida; Shaufa Adam; Haleemath Sama; Fathimath Joozan Zareer; Aishath Majidha; Mueena Hassan; Nasra Ibrahim; Fathimath Zeeniya Moosa; Khadheeja Ibrahim	Lee Hyo-hee; Kim Hee-jin; Kim Hae-ran; Lee Jae-yeong; Nam Jie-youn; Lee Da-yeong; Kim Yeon-koung; Han Song-yi; Park Jeong-ah; Yang Hyo-jin; Bae Yoo-na; Baek Mok-hwa
Thailand			
Piyanut Pannoy; Em-orn Phanusit; Thatdao Nuekjang; Pleumjit Thinkaow; Onuma Sittirak; Khatthalee Pinsuwan; Wilavan Apinyapong; Tapaphaipun Chaisri; Nootsara Tomkom; Malika Kanthong; Kaewkalaya Kamulthala; Parinya Pankaew			

== Results ==
All times are Korea Standard Time (UTC+09:00)

=== Preliminary round ===
==== Group A ====
Pos	Team	Pld	W	L	Pts	SW	SL	SR	SPW	SPL	SPR	Qualification
1	South Korea	3	3	0	9	9	0	MAX	225	143	1.573	Quarterfinals
2	Thailand	3	2	1	6	6	4	1.500	237	202	1.173	Quarterfinals
3	Japan	3	1	2	3	4	6	0.667	211	204	1.034	Quarterfinals
4	India	3	0	3	0	0	9	0.000	101	225	0.449	Quarterfinal qualification

Source: Results

Date	Time	Venue		Score		Set 1	Set 2	Set 3	Set 4	Set 5	Total	Report
20 Sep	17:30	Incheon	South Korea	3–0	India	25–5	25–12	25–13			75–30	Report
21 Sep	14:00	Incheon	Thailand	3–1	Japan	25–27	25–18	25–19	25–21		100–85	Report
22 Sep	13:00	Ansan	India	0–3	Japan	6–25	11–25	12–25			29–75	Report
23 Sep	19:30	Incheon	South Korea	3–0	Thailand	25–21	25–20	25–21			75–62	Report
24 Sep	13:00	Ansan	Thailand	3–0	India	25–19	25–12	25–11			75–42	Report
25 Sep	19:30	Ansan	South Korea	3–0	Japan	25–17	25–16	25–18			75–51	Report

==== Group B ====
Pos	Team	Pld	W	L	Pts	SW	SL	SR	SPW	SPL	SPR	Qualification
1	China	4	4	0	12	12	0	MAX	301	151	1.993	Quarterfinals
2	Chinese Taipei	4	3	1	9	9	3	3.000	288	187	1.540	Quarterfinals
3	Kazakhstan	4	2	2	6	6	7	0.857	261	256	1.020	Quarterfinals
4	Hong Kong	4	1	3	3	4	9	0.444	225	274	0.821	Quarterfinals
5	Maldives	4	0	4	0	0	12	0.000	93	300	0.310	Quarterfinal qualification

Source: Results

Date	Time	Venue		Score		Set 1	Set 2	Set 3	Set 4	Set 5	Total	Report
20 Sep	14:00	Ansan	Chinese Taipei	3–0	Hong Kong	25–10	25–12	25–19			75–41	Report
21 Sep	16:00	Incheon	Kazakhstan	0–3	China	14–25	11–25	14–25			39–75	Report
22 Sep	15:30	Ansan	Hong Kong	1–3	Kazakhstan	25–23	17–25	16–25	22–25		80–98	Report
22 Sep	18:00	Ansan	Maldives	0–3	Chinese Taipei	3–25	11–25	7–25			21–75	Report
23 Sep	15:00	Incheon	China	3–0	Hong Kong	25–10	25–12	25–7			75–29	Report
23 Sep	17:00	Incheon	Kazakhstan	3–0	Maldives	25–6	25–10	25–10			75–26	Report
24 Sep	15:30	Ansan	Maldives	0–3	China	7–25	7–25	6–25			20–75	Report
24 Sep	18:00	Ansan	Chinese Taipei	3–0	Kazakhstan	25–17	25–14	25–18			75–49	Report
25 Sep	14:00	Ansan	China	3–0	Chinese Taipei	25–17	26–24	25–22			76–63	Report
25 Sep	16:30	Ansan	Hong Kong	3–0	Maldives	25–5	25–11	25–10			75–26	Report

=== Quarterfinal qualification ===
Date	Time	Venue		Score		Set 1	Set 2	Set 3	Set 4	Set 5	Total	Report
26 Sep	15:00	Ansan	India	3–0	Maldives	25–12	25–7	25–11			75–30	Report

=== Final round ===
Quarterfinals
27 September
South Korea	3
Hong Kong	0
27 September
Chinese Taipei	0
Japan	3
27 September
China	3
India	0
27 September
Thailand	3
Kazakhstan	0

Semifinals
30 September
South Korea	3
Japan	0
30 September
China	3
Thailand	1

Gold medal match
2 October
South Korea	3
China	0
Bronze medal match
2 October
Japan	0
Thailand	3

Semifinals 5th–8th
30 September
India	0
Kazakhstan	3
30 September
Hong Kong	0
Chinese Taipei	3

Classification 5th–6th
2 October
Kazakhstan	0
Chinese Taipei	3
Classification 7th–8th
2 October
India	0
Hong Kong	3

==== Quarterfinals ====
Date	Time	Venue		Score		Set 1	Set 2	Set 3	Set 4	Set 5	Total	Report
27 Sep	12:00	Incheon	South Korea	3–0	Hong Kong	25–13	25–15	25–11			75–39	Report
27 Sep	14:30	Incheon	China	3–0	India	25–11	25–12	25–10			75–33	Report
27 Sep	17:00	Incheon	Thailand	3–0	Kazakhstan	25–10	25–10	25–10			75–30	Report
27 Sep	19:30	Incheon	Chinese Taipei	0–3	Japan	21–25	17–25	16–25			54–75	Report

==== Semifinals 5th–8th ====
Date	Time	Venue		Score		Set 1	Set 2	Set 3	Set 4	Set 5	Total	Report
30 Sep	10:30	Ansan	India	0–3	Kazakhstan	20–25	19–25	20–25			59–75	Report
30 Sep	16:30	Ansan	Hong Kong	0–3	Chinese Taipei	18–25	14–25	9–25			41–75	Report

==== Semifinals ====
Date	Time	Venue		Score		Set 1	Set 2	Set 3	Set 4	Set 5	Total	Report
30 Sep	13:30	Ansan	China	3–1	Thailand	19–25	25–23	25–15	25–19		94–82	Report
30 Sep	19:30	Ansan	South Korea	3–0	Japan	25–16	25–19	25–16			75–51	Report

==== Classification 7th–8th ====
Date	Time	Venue		Score		Set 1	Set 2	Set 3	Set 4	Set 5	Total	Report
02 Oct	10:30	Ansan	India	0–3	Hong Kong	16–25	26–28	18–25			60–78	Report

==== Classification 5th–6th ====
Date	Time	Venue		Score		Set 1	Set 2	Set 3	Set 4	Set 5	Total	Report
02 Oct	19:30	Ansan	Kazakhstan	0–3	Chinese Taipei	17–25	17–25	19–25			53–75	Report

==== Bronze medal match ====
Date	Time	Venue		Score		Set 1	Set 2	Set 3	Set 4	Set 5	Total	Report
02 Oct	13:30	Ansan	Japan	0–3	Thailand	17–25	22–25	23–25			62–75	Report

==== Gold medal match ====
Date	Time	Venue		Score		Set 1	Set 2	Set 3	Set 4	Set 5	Total	Report
02 Oct	19:30	Incheon	South Korea	3–0	China	25–20	25–13	25–21			75–54	Report

== Final standing ==
Rank	Team	Pld	W	L
1st place, gold medalist(s)	South Korea	6	6	0
2nd place, silver medalist(s)	China	7	6	1
3rd place, bronze medalist(s)	Thailand	6	4	2
4	Japan	6	2	4
5	Chinese Taipei	7	5	2
6	Kazakhstan	7	3	4
7	Hong Kong	7	2	5
8	India	7	1	6
9	Maldives	5	0	5
