= Volleyball at the 2002 Asian Games =

- Venue: Gijang Gymnasium
- Dates: 2–13 October 2002
- Competitors: 177 from 11 nations

Volleyball was one of the many sports which was held at the 2002 Asian Games in Busan, South Korea. All matches played at the Gijang Gymnasium.

== Schedule ==
P	Preliminary round	C	Classification	½	Semifinals	F	Finals

Event↓/Date →	2nd Wed	3rd Thu	4th Fri	5th Sat	6th Sun	7th Mon	8th Tue	9th Wed	10th Thu	11th Fri	12th Sat	13th Sun
Men	P	P	P	P	P	P	P		C	½	C	F
Women	P	P	P	P	P	P	P		P	P	F	

== Medalists ==
Event	Gold	Silver	Bronze
Men	South Korea; Shin Jin-sik; Kim Se-jin; Park Jae-han; Yeo Oh-hyun; Choi Tae-woong; Kim Sang-woo; Bang Sin-bong; Shin Sun-ho; Lee Kyung-soo; Suk Jin-wook; Kwon Young-min; Chang Byung-chul	Iran; Amir Hossein Monazzami; Amir Hosseini; Abbas Ghasemian; Peyman Akbari; Mohammad Mansouri; Ahsanollah Shirkavand; Mahmoud Afshardoust; Behnam Mahmoudi; Mohammad Torkashvand; Afshin Oliaei; Alireza Behboudi; Rahman Mohammadirad	Japan; Kenji Yamamoto; Mitsuaki Utena; Yuichiro Sawahata; Masayuki Izumikawa; Yukito Tokumoto; Naoki Morokuma; Masahiro Miyashita; Takamasa Suzuki; Daisuke Usami; Takehiro Kihara; Kota Yamamura; Yu Koshikawa
Women	China; Zhang Jing; Feng Kun; Yang Hao; Liu Yanan; Li Shan; Zhou Suhong; Zhao Ruirui; Zhang Yuehong; Chen Jing; Song Nina; Li Ying; Xiong Zi	South Korea; Kang Hye-mi; Ku Min-jung; Kim Sa-nee; Choi Kwang-hee; Park Mee-kyung; Koo Ki-lan; Chung Sun-hye; Lee Meong-hee; Kim Mi-jin; Chang So-yun; Jung Dae-young; Kim Nam-soon	Japan; Minako Onuki; Chikako Kumamae; Shinako Tanaka; Kana Oyama; Hisako Mukai; Sachiko Kodama; Miyuki Takahashi; Makiko Horai; Yuko Sano; Sachiko Sugiyama; Ai Otomo; Megumi Kawamura

== Medal table ==
Rank	Nation	Gold	Silver	Bronze	Total
1	South Korea (KOR)	1	1	0	2
2	China (CHN)	1	0	0	1
3	Iran (IRI)	0	1	0	1
4	Japan (JPN)	0	0	2	2
Totals (4 entries)		2	2	2	6

== Draw ==
The men were drawn into two groups of five and four teams, the women were played in round robin format. The teams were seeded based on their final ranking at the 2001 Asian Men's Volleyball Championship.

Pool A

- South Korea (Host)
- Iran (5)
- Macau
- India
- Qatar

Pool B

- Japan (3)
- China (4)
- Chinese Taipei
- Pakistan

== Final standing ==
=== Men ===
Rank	Team	Pld	W	L
1st place, gold medalist(s)	South Korea	6	6	0
2nd place, silver medalist(s)	Iran	6	4	2
3rd place, bronze medalist(s)	Japan	5	3	2
4	China	5	3	2
5	India	6	4	2
6	Chinese Taipei	5	2	3
7	Pakistan	5	1	4
8	Qatar	6	1	5
9	Macau	4	0	4

=== Women ===
Rank	Team	Pld	W	L
1st place, gold medalist(s)	China	6	6	0
2nd place, silver medalist(s)	South Korea	6	4	2
3rd place, bronze medalist(s)	Japan	5	3	2
4	Chinese Taipei	5	2	3
5	Thailand	5	1	4
6	Kazakhstan	5	0	5
