= South Korea women's national volleyball team =

South Korea
- Association: Korea Volleyball Association
- Confederation: AVC
- Head coach: Cha Sang-hyun
- FIVB ranking: 39 ▲1 (24 May 2026)

Uniforms
Home	Away	Third

Summer Olympics
- Appearances: 12 (First in 1964)
- Best result: Bronze Medal (1976)

World Championship
- Appearances: 13 (First in 1967)
- Best result: Bronze Medal (1967, 1974)

World Cup
- Appearances: 13 (First in 1973)
- Best result: Bronze Medal (1973, 1977)
- www.kva.or.kr
Honours
Olympic Games
Bronze medal – third place	1976 Montreal	Team
World Championship
Bronze medal – third place	1967 Tokyo
Bronze medal – third place	1974 Guadalajara
World Cup
Bronze medal – third place	1973 Uruguay
Bronze medal – third place	1977 Japan
World Grand Prix
Bronze medal – third place	1997 Kobe
Asian Games
Gold medal – first place	1994 Hiroshima	Team
Gold medal – first place	2014 Incheon	Team
Silver medal – second place	1962 Jakarta	Team
Silver medal – second place	1966 Bangkok	Team
Silver medal – second place	1970 Bangkok	Team
Silver medal – second place	1974 Tehran	Team
Silver medal – second place	1990 Beijing	Team
Silver medal – second place	1998 Bangkok	Team
Silver medal – second place	2002 Busan	Team
Silver medal – second place	2010 Guangzhou	Team
Bronze medal – third place	1978 Bangkok	Team
Bronze medal – third place	1982 New Delhi	Team
Bronze medal – third place	1986 Seoul	Team
Bronze medal – third place	2018 Jakarta-Palembang	Team
Asian Championship
Silver medal – second place	1975 Melbourne
Silver medal – second place	1989 Hong Kong
Silver medal – second place	1995 Chiang Mai
Silver medal – second place	1997 Manila
Silver medal – second place	1999 Hong Kong
Silver medal – second place	2001 Nakhon Ratchasima
Silver medal – second place	2015 Tianjin
Bronze medal – third place	1979 Hong Kong
Bronze medal – third place	1983 Fukuoka
Bronze medal – third place	1987 Shanghai
Bronze medal – third place	1991 Bangkok
Bronze medal – third place	1993 Shanghai
Bronze medal – third place	2003 Ho Chi Minh City
Bronze medal – third place	2011 Taipei
Bronze medal – third place	2013 Nakhon Ratchasima
Bronze medal – third place	2017 Metro Manila
Bronze medal – third place	2019 Seoul
Asian Cup
Silver medal – second place	2008 Nakhon Ratchasima
Silver medal – second place	2014 Shenzhen
Bronze medal – third place	2010 Taicang
AVC Cup
Gold medal – first place	2026 Candon	Team
Eastern Asian Championship
Silver medal – second place	2010 Jeju
Bronze medal – third place	2025 Hong Kong
Bronze medal – third place	2026 Hong Kong

The South Korea women's national volleyball team (Korean: 대한민국 여자 배구 국가대표팀; recognized as Korea by FIVB) represents South Korea in international volleyball competitions and friendly matches. It was one of the leading squads in the world in the 1970s, 1990s and 2010s, having won the bronze medal at the 1976 Summer Olympics in Montreal, Quebec, Canada, and placing fourth at the 1972 Summer Olympics in Munich, Germany, the 2012 Summer Olympics in London, Great Britain and the 2020 Summer Olympics in Tokyo, Japan.

== Results ==
=== Olympic Games ===
Gold Silver Bronze Fourth place

Olympic Games record
Year	Round	Position	GP	MW	ML	SW	SL
(Japan) 1964	Round robin	6th place	5	0	5	0	15
(Mexico) 1968	Round robin	5th place	7	3	4	11	14
(West Germany) 1972	Semifinals	Fourth place	5	2	3	7	9
(Canada) 1976	Semifinals	Bronze	5	3	2	10	11
(Soviet Union) 1980	Did not participate due to boycott						
(United States) 1984	5th–8th places	5th place	5	3	2	12	7
(South Korea) 1988	5th–8th places	8th place	5	1	4	8	13
(Spain) 1992	Did not qualify						
(United States) 1996	5th–8th places	6th place	8	3	5	13	15
(Australia) 2000	5th–8th places	8th place	8	3	5	13	18
(Greece) 2004	Quarterfinals	5th place	6	3	3	9	10
(China) 2008	Did not qualify						
(United Kingdom) 2012	Semifinals	Fourth place	8	3	5	14	17
(Brazil) 2016	Quarterfinals	5th place	6	3	3	11	10
(Japan) 2020	Semifinals	Fourth place	8	4	4	12	17
(France) 2024	Did not qualify						
(United States) 2028	To be determined						
(Australia) 2032	To be determined						
Total	0 titles	12/18	76	31	45	120	156

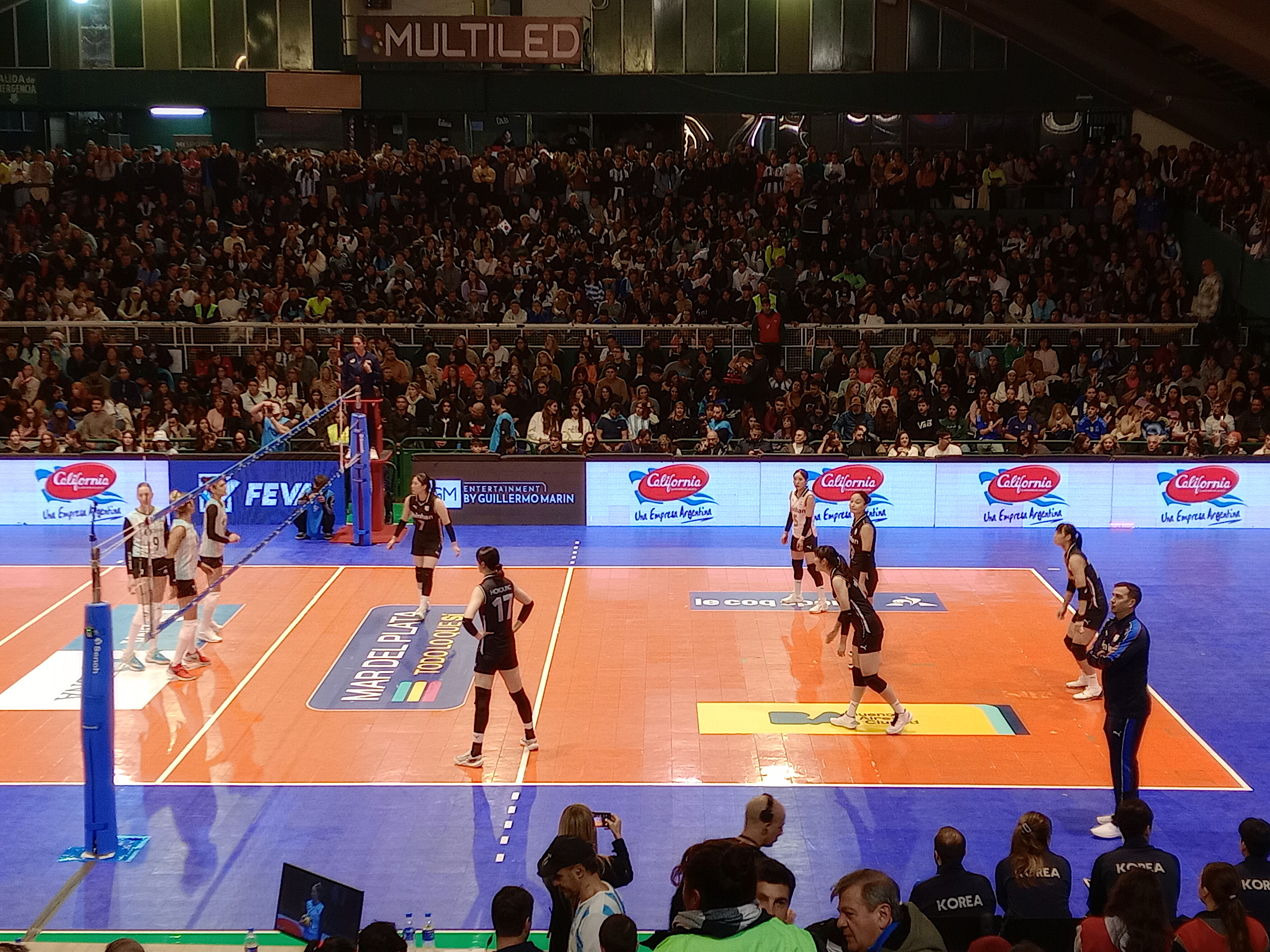
South Korea women's national volleyball team in a friendly game against Argentina in 2024

=== World Championship ===
Champions Runners up Third place Fourth place

World Championship record
Year	Round	Position	GP	MW	ML	SW	SL
(Soviet Union) 1952	Did not compete						
(France) 1956	Did not compete						
(Brazil) 1960	Did not compete						
(Soviet Union) 1962	Did not compete						
(Japan) 1967	Round robin	Third place	3	1	2	4	6
(Bulgaria) 1970	Did not compete						
(Mexico) 1974	Final places	Third place	11	9	2	28	11
(Soviet Union) 1978	Semifinals	Fourth place	9	6	3	21	9
(Peru) 1982	5th–8th places	7th place	9	7	2	21	7
(Czechoslovakia) 1986	5th–8th places	8th place	8	3	5	10	15
(China) 1990	5th–8th places	5th place	7	5	2	15	9
(Brazil) 1994	Semifinals	Fourth place	7	3	4	11	14
(Japan) 1998	Second round	9th place	6	3	3	10	13
(Germany) 2002	5th–8th places	6th place	11	8	3	27	14
(Japan) 2006	Second round	13th place	9	3	6	14	18
(Japan) 2010	Second round	13th place	9	5	4	18	15
(Italy) 2014	Did not qualify						
(Japan) 2018	First round	17th place	5	1	4	7	12
(Netherlands) (Poland) 2022	First round	20th place	5	1	4	3	13
(Thailand) 2025	Did not qualify						
(Canada) (United States) 2027	Qualified						
(Philippines) 2029	To be determined						
Total	0 titles	13/22	99	55	44	189	156

=== World Cup ===
- (Uruguay) 1973 — (bronze) Bronze Medal
- (Japan) 1977 — (bronze) Bronze Medal
- (Japan) 1981 — 5th place
- (Japan) 1985 — 7th place
- (Japan) 1989 — 7th place
- (Japan) 1991 — 6th place
- (Japan) 1995 — 5th place
- (Japan) 1999 — 4th place
- (Japan) 2003 — 9th place
- (Japan) 2007 — 8th place
- (Japan) 2011 — 9th place
- (Japan) 2015 — 6th place
- (Japan) 2019 — 6th place
- (Japan) 2023 — Did not participate

=== World Grand Prix ===
- (Hong Kong) 1993 — 5th place
- (China) 1994 — 5th place
- (China) 1995 — 5th place
- (China) 1996 — 7th place
- (Japan) 1997 — (bronze) Bronze Medal
- (Hong Kong) 1998 — 6th place
- (China) 1999 — 6th place
- (Philippines) 2000 — 5th place
- (Macau) 2001 — 7th place
- (Italy) 2003 — 6th place
- (Italy) 2004 — 11th place
- (Japan) 2005 — 9th place
- (Italy) 2006 — 9th place
- (Japan) 2009 — 12th place
- (Macau) 2011 — 9th place
- (China) 2012 — 14th place
- (Japan) 2014 — 8th place
- (China) 2017 — 14th place

=== Nations League ===
Nations League record
Year	Round	Position	Pld	W	L	SW	SL
(China) 2018	Preliminary round	12th place	15	5	10	16	34
(China) 2019	Preliminary round	15th place	15	3	12	16	37
(Italy) 2021	Preliminary round	15th place	15	3	12	16	40
(Turkey) 2022	Preliminary round	16th place	12	0	12	3	36
(United States) 2023	Preliminary round	16th place	12	0	12	3	36
(Thailand) 2024	Preliminary round	15th place	12	2	10	8	33
(Poland) 2025	Relegated	18th place	12	1	11	11	35
(Macau) 2026	Did not participate						
Total	7/8		93	14	79	73	251

=== World Grand Champions Cup ===
- (Japan) 1993 — Did not qualify
- (Japan) 1997 — 6th place
- (Japan) 2001 — 6th place
- (Japan) 2005 — 6th place
- (Japan) 2009 — 5th place
- (Japan) 2013 — Did not qualify
- (Japan) 2017 — 6th place

=== Asian Games ===
- (Indonesia) 1962 — Silver Medal
- (Thailand) 1966 — Silver Medal
- (Thailand) 1970 — Silver Medal
- (Iran) 1974 — Silver Medal
- (Thailand) 1978 — Bronze Medal
- (India) 1982 — Bronze Medal
- (South Korea) 1986 — Bronze Medal
- (China) 1990 — Silver Medal
- (Japan) 1994 — Gold Medal
- (Thailand) 1998 — Silver Medal
- (South Korea) 2002 — Silver Medal
- (Qatar) 2006 — 5th place
- (China) 2010 — Silver Medal
- (South Korea) 2014 — Gold Medal
- (Indonesia) 2018 — Bronze Medal
- (China) 2022 — 5th place
- (Japan) 2026 — 4th place

=== Asian Championship ===
- (Australia) 1975 — (silver) Silver Medal
- (Hong Kong) 1979 — (bronze) Bronze Medal
- (Japan) 1983 — (bronze) Bronze Medal
- (China) 1987 — (bronze) Bronze Medal
- (Hong Kong) 1989 — (silver) Silver Medal
- (Thailand) 1991 — (bronze) Bronze Medal
- (China) 1993 — (bronze) Bronze Medal
- (Thailand) 1995 — (silver) Silver Medal
- (Philippines) 1997 — (silver) Silver Medal
- (Hong Kong) 1999 — (silver) Silver Medal
- (Thailand) 2001 — (silver) Silver Medal
- (Vietnam) 2003 — (bronze) Bronze Medal
- (China) 2005 — 4th place
- (Thailand) 2007 — 4th place
- (Vietnam) 2009 — 4th place
- (Taiwan) 2011 — (bronze) Bronze Medal
- (Thailand) 2013 — (bronze) Bronze Medal
- (China) 2015 — (silver) Silver Medal
- (Philippines) 2017 — (bronze) Bronze Medal
- (South Korea) 2019 — (bronze) Bronze Medal
- (Philippines) 2021 — Cancelled due to COVID-19 pandemic
- (Thailand) 2023 — 6th place
- (China) 2026 — 6th place

=== Asian Cup ===
- (Thailand) 2008 — (silver) Silver Medal
- (China) 2010 — (bronze) Bronze Medal
- (Kazakhstan) 2012 — 6th place
- (China) 2014 — (silver) Silver Medal
- (Vietnam) 2016 — 8th place
- (Thailand) 2018 — 6th place
- (Taiwan) 2020 — Cancelled due to COVID-19 pandemic
- (Philippines) 2022 — 9th place

=== AVC Cup ===
- (Philippines) 2026 — (gold) Gold Medal

=== Montreux Volley Masters ===
- (Switzerland) 1990 — Bronze Medal
- (Switzerland) 1991 — 5th place
- (Switzerland) 1992 — Bronze Medal
- (Switzerland) 1993 — Bronze Medal
- (Switzerland) 1994 — 6th place
- (Switzerland) 1995 — 5th place
- (Switzerland) 1996 — 6th place

== Team ==
=== Current roster ===
- Head Coach : Cha Sang-hyun (2026)

The following is the South Korean roster from 2026 AVC Women's Volleyball Cup.

No.	Name	Position	Date of birth	Height	2024–25 Club
1	Lee Ye-rim	OH	10 January 1998	1.75 m (5 ft 9 in)	(South Korea) Suwon Hyundai Hillstate
2	Lee Ju-ah	MB	21 August 2000	1.85 m (6 ft 1 in)	(South Korea) Hwaseong IBK Altos
3	Kim Da-in	S	15 October 1998	1.72 m (5 ft 8 in)	(South Korea) Suwon Hyundai Hillstate
4	Han Da-hye	L	28 February 1995	1.64 m (5 ft 5 in)	(South Korea) Gwangju AI Peppers
5	Lee Young-joo	L	9 March 1999	1.61 m (5 ft 3 in)	(South Korea) Suwon Hyundai Hillstate
6	Park Eun-jin	MB	15 December 1999	1.87 m (6 ft 2 in)	(South Korea) Anyang Jung Kwan Jang
9	Na Hyun-soo	OP	15 September 1999	1.83 m (6 ft 0 in)	(South Korea) Suwon Hyundai Hillstate
12	Lee Da-hyeon	MB	11 November 2001	1.85 m (6 ft 1 in)	(South Korea) Incheon Heungkuk Life Insurance
14	Jeong Yun-ju	OH	14 April 2003	1.78 m (5 ft 10 in)	(South Korea) Incheon Heungkuk Life Insurance
15	Kim Se-been	MB	16 June 2005	1.87 m (6 ft 2 in)	(South Korea) Gimcheon Korea Hi-Pass
20	Park Yeo-reum	OH	29 June 2007	1.80 m (5 ft 11 in)	(South Korea) Anyang Jung Kwan Jang
21	Lee Su-yeon	S	5 November 2006	1.77 m (5 ft 10 in)	(South Korea) Gimcheon Korea Hi-Pass
22	Lee Hyo-im	OH	22 September 2007	1.64 m (5 ft 5 in)	(South Korea) GS Caltex Seoul Kixx
97	Kang So-hwi (c)	OH	18 July 1997	1.80 m (5 ft 11 in)	(South Korea) Gimcheon Korea Hi-Pass

=== Squads ===
==== Olympic Games ====
- 1964 Olympic Games — 6th place
  Seo Chun-gang, Moon Kyung-Sook, Yu Chun-ja, Kim Gil-ja, O Sun-ok, Jeong Jeong-eun, Choi Don-hui, Hong Nam-seon, O Cheong-ja, Yun Jeong-suk, Gwag Yong-ja, Lee Geun-su. Head coach:
- 1968 Olympic Games — 5th place
  An Gyeong-ja, Hwang Gyu-ok, Kim Young-ja, Kim Oe-sun, Kim Yeong-Ja, Lee Hyang-sim, Moon Kyung-Sook, Park Geum-suk, Seo Hui-suk, Yang Jin-su, Kwack Yong-Ja. Head coach:
- 1972 Olympic Games — 4th place
  Kim Chung–Han, Yu Kyung-hwa, Yoon Young-nae, Yu Jung-hye, Jo Hea-jung, Lee In-sook, Kim Kun–Bong, Lee Jung-Ja, Lee Soon-bok, Kim Yeong-Ja, Kim Eun–Hie. Head coach:
- 1976 Olympic Games — Bronze Medal
  Lee Soon-Bok, Yu Jung-Hye, Byon Myung-Ja, Lee Soon-ok, Baik Myung-Sun, Chang Hee-Sook, Ma Kum-Ja, Yoon Young-nae, Yu Kyung-Hwa, Park Mi-Kum, Jo Hea-Jung, and Jung Soon-ok. Head coach: Kim Han-Soo.
- 1984 Olympic Games — 5th place
  Lee Eun-Kyung, Lee Un-Yim, Jin Chun-Mae, Lee Young-Sun, Kim Jeong-Sun, Jea Sook-Ja, Han Kyung-Ae, Lee Myung-Hee, Kim Ok-Soon, Park Mi-Hee, Lim Hye-Sook, and Yoon Chung-Hye.
- 1988 Olympic Games — 8th place
  Park Mi-Hee, Kim Kyung-Hee, Kim Kui-Soon, Lim Hye-Sook, Yoo Young-Mi, Nam Soon-Ok, Yoon Chung-Hye, Park Bok-Rye, Kim Yoon-Hye, Sun Mi-Sook, Moon Sun-Hee, and Ji Kyung-Hee. Head coach: Hwang Sung-On.
- 1996 Olympic Games — 6th place
  Chang So-Yun, Chang Yoon-Hee, Choi Kwang-Hee, Chung Sun-Hye, Eoh Yeon-Soon, Hong Ji-Yeon, Kang Hye-Mi, Kim Nam-Soon, Lee In-Sook, Lee Soo-Jung, Park Soo-Jeong, and Yoo Yin-Kyung. Head coach: Kim Cheol-Yong.
- 2000 Olympic Games — 8th place
  Chang So-Yun, Choi Kwang-Hee, Chung Sun-Hye, Eoh Yeon-Soon, Kang Hye-Mi, Kim Guy-Hyun, Koo Ki-Lan, Ku Min-Jung, Lee Meong-Hee, Lee Yun-Hui, Park Mee-Kyung, and Park Soo-Jeong. Head coach: Kim Cheol-Yong.
- 2004 Olympic Games — 5th place
  Lee Jung-Ok, Kang Hye-Mi, Ku Min-Jung, Kim Sa-Nee, Choi Kwang-Hee, Nam Jie-Youn, Chang So-Yun, Kim Mi-Jin, Pak Sun-Mi, Jung Dae-Young, Han Song-Yi, and Kim Se-Young. Head coach: Kim Cheol-Yong.
- 2012 Olympic Games — 4th place
  Ha Joon-eem, Kim Sa-nee (C), Kim Hae-ran, Lim Hyo-sook, Kim Yeon-koung, Han Yoo-mi, Han Song-yi, Jung Dae-young, Hwang Youn-joo, Yang Hyo-jin, Kim Hee-jin, Lee Sook-ja. Head coach: Kim Hyung-sil.
- 2016 Olympic Games — 5th place
  Lee Hyo-hee, Kim Hee-jin, Kim Hae-ran, Hwang Youn-joo, Lee Jae-yeong, Nam Jie-youn, Kim Yeon-koung (C), Kim Su-ji, Park Jeong-ah, Yang Hyo-jin, Bae Yoo-na, Yeum Hye-seon. Head coach: Lee Jung-chul.
- 2020 Olympic Games — 4th place
  Lee So-young, Yeum Hye-seon, Kim Hee-jin, Ahn Hye-jin, Park Eun-jin, Oh Ji-young, Kim Yeon-koung (C), Kim Su-ji, Park Jeong-ah, Yang Hyo-jin, Jeong Ji-yun, Pyo Seung-ju. Head coach: Stefano Lavarini.

==== World Championships ====
- 1998 FIVB World Championship — 9th place
  Kang Hye-mi, Ku Min-jung, Kang Mee-sun, Kim Chang-hun, Park Mee-kyung, Chung Sun-hye, Jung Eun-sun, Park Soo-jeong, Hong Ji-yeon, Kim Young-sook, Chang So-yun, Lee Meong-hee. Head coach: Kim Hyung-Sil.
- 2002 FIVB World Championship — 6th place
  Chang So-yun, Choi Kwang-hee, Chung Sun-hye, Han Yoo-mi, Jung Dae-young, Kang Hye-mi, Kim Mi-jin, Kim Sa-nee, Koo Ki-lan, Ku Min-jung, Lee Meong-hee, Park Mee-kyung. Head coach: Ryu Hoa-suk.
- 2006 FIVB World Championship — 13th place
  Kim Sa-nee, Nam Jie-youn, Han Yoo-mi, Kim Ji-hyun, Kim Yeon-koung, Han Soo-ji, Han Song-yi, Jung Dae-young, Hwang Youn-joo, Kim Se-young, Kim Hae-ran, Bae Yoo-na. Head coach: Kim Myeong-soo.
- 2010 FIVB World Championship — 13th place [1]
  Oh Ji-young, Kim Sa-nee, Nam Jie-youn, Yim Myung-ok, Kim Yeon-koung, Han Yoo-mi, Han Song-yi, Jung Dae-young, Hwang Youn-joo, Kim Se-young, Lee So-ra, Yang Hyo-jin. Head coach: Park Sam-ryong.
- 2018 FIVB World Championship — 17th place [1]
  Park Eun-jin, Lee Ju-ah, Jung Ho-young, Lee Hyo-hee, Lee Na-yeon, Kim Hae-ran, Oh Ji-young, Kim Yeon-koung, Kim Su-ji, Lee So-young, Park Jeong-ah, Yang Hyo-jin, Lee Jae-yeong, Na Hyun-jung. Head coach: Cha Hae-won.
- 2022 FIVB World Championship — 20th place [1]
  Han Soo-ji, Yeom Hye-seon, Han Da-hye, Kim Ha-kyung, Kim Yeong-yeon, Lee Ju-ah, Park Hye-min, Lee Da-hyeon, Park Jeong-ah, Lee Seon-woo, Ha Hye-jin, Hwang Min-kyoung, Pyo Seung-ju, Yoo Seo-yeun. Head coach: Cesar Hernandez Gonzalez.

==== World Cup ====
- 1999 FIVB World Cup — 4th place
  Chang So-Yun, Chang Yoon-Hee, Choi Kwang-Hee, Chung Sun-Hye, Eoh Yeon-Soon, Hong Ji-Yeon, Kang Hye-Mi, Kim Sa-Nee, Ku Min-Jung, Lee Yun-Hui, Park Mee-Kyung, and Park Soo-Jeong. Head coach: Kim Cheol-Yong.
- 2003 FIVB World Cup — 9th place
  Chang So-Yun, Choi Kwang-Hee, Jung Dae-Young, Kang Hye-Mi, Kim Hyang-Suk, Kim Sa-Nee, Koo Ki-Lan, Lee Meong-Hee, Lim Yu-Jin, Nam Jie-Youn, Park Mee-Kyung, and Yang Sook-Kyung. Head coach: Kim Cheol-Yong.
- 2007 FIVB World Cup — 8th place
  Bae Yoo-na, Ji Jung-Hee, Kim Sa-Nee, Kim Hae-Ran, La Hae-Won, Kim Yeon-Koung, Han Yoo-Mi, Han Song-Yi, Jung Dae-Young, Kim Se-Young, Kwak Mi-Ran, and Yeum Hye-Seon. Head coach: Lee Jung-Chul.
- 2011 FIVB World Cup — 9th place
  Kim Min-Ji, Jung Ji-Youn, Hwang Youn-Joo, Choi Youn-Ok, Yoon Hye-Suk, Nam Jie-Youn, Kim Yeon-Koung, Lee Bo-Lam, Kim Se-Young, Kim Hye-Jin, Kim Hee-Jin, and Park Jeong-Ah. Head coach: Kim Hyung-Sil.
- 2015 FIVB World Cup — 6th place
  Lee So-Young, Kim Hee-Jin, Na Hyun-Jung, Hwang Youn-Joo, Lee Jae-Yeong, Kim Yeon-Koung, Kim Su-Ji, Park Jeong-Ah, Yang Hyo-Jin, Chae Seon-Ah, Lee Da-Yeong, Cho Song-Hwa, and Yim Myung-Ok. Head coach: Lee Jung-Chul.
- 2019 FIVB World Cup — 6th place
  Lee So-Young, Yeum Hye-Seon, Kim Hee-Jin, Kim Hae-Ran, Ha Hye-Jin, Park Eun-jin, Oh Ji-Young, Kim Yeon-Koung, Kim Su-Ji, Park Jeong-Ah, Yang Hyo-Jin, Kang So-Hwi, Lee Jae-Yeong, and Lee Da-Yeong. Head coach: Stefano Lavarini.

==== Asian Women's Volleyball Championship ====
- 2003 Asian Women's Volleyball Championship — Bronze Medal
  Choi Kwang-hee, Hong Mi-sun, Kim Hyang-suk, Lee Sook-ja, Lee Meong-hee, Jung Dae-young, Lee Yun-hui, Nam Jie-youn, Kim Sa-nee, Kim Mi-jin, Lim Yu-jin. Head coach: Kim Cheol-yong.
- 2011 Asian Women's Volleyball Championship — Bronze Medal
  Kim Yeon-koung, Han Song-yi, Kim Hee-jin, Hwang Youn-joo, Kim Hye-jin, Park Jeong-ah, Jung Dae-young, Yoon Hye-suk, Lee Hyo-hee, Nam Jie-youn, Kim Se-young, Lee Jae-eun. Head coach: Kim Hyung-sil.
- 2013 Asian Women's Volleyball Championship — Bronze Medal
  Lee Da-yeong, Kim Su-ji, Pyo Seung-ju, Han Song-yi, Kim Hee-jin, Park Jeong-ah, Kim Yeon-koung, Oh Ji-young, Kim Hae-ran, Lee Jae-eun, Lee Jae-yeong, Bae Yoo-na. Head coach: Cha Hae-won.
- 2015 Asian Women's Volleyball Championship — Silver Medal
  Lee Hyo-hee, Kim Su-ji, Kim Yu-ri, Moon Jung-won, Kim Hee-jin, Park Jeong-ah, Kim Yeon-koung, Na Hyun-jung, Nam Jie-youn, Han Su-ji, Lee Jae-yeong, Yang Hyo-jin. Head coach: Lee Jung-chul.
- 2017 Asian Women's Volleyball Championship — Bronze Medal
  Lee Jae-eun, Kim Yeon-gyeon, Yeum Hye-seon, Kim Hee-jin, Na Hyun-jung, Han Soo-ji, Kim Yeon-koung (C), Kim Su-ji, Park Jeong-ah, Yang Hyo-jin, Kim Yu-ri, Kim Mi-youn, Hwang Min-kyoung. Head coach: Hong Sung-jin.
- 2019 Asian Women's Volleyball Championship — Bronze Medal
  Lee So-young, Lee Ju-ah, Yeum Hye-seon, Kim Hee-jin, Kim Hae-ran, Lee Na-yeon, Ha Hye-jin, Park Eun-jin, Oh Ji-young, Kim Yeon-koung, Kim Su-ji, Yang Hyo-jin, Lee Jae-yeong, Pyo Seung-ju. Head coach: Stefano Lavarini.

==== Nations League ====
- 2018 FIVB Volleyball Women's Nations League
  Kim Yeon-koung (C), Lee Hyo-hee, Na Hyun-soo, Kim Ju-hyang, Kim Hae-ran (L), Kim Hee-jin, Lee Na-yeon, Yim Myung-ok (L), Jeong Sun-ah, Kim Su-ji, Kim Chae-yeon, Park Jeong-ah, Yang Hyo-jin, Kang So-hwi, Lee Jae-yeong, Yoo Seo-yeun, Lee Da-yeong, Na Hyun-jung (L), Lee Won-jeong, Park Eun-jin Head coach: Cha Hae-won.
- 2019 FIVB Volleyball Women's Nations League [1]
  Kim Yeon-koung (C), Lee So-young, Pyo Seung-ju, Kim Hae-ran (L), Kim Hee-jin, Lee Hyo-hee, An Hye-jin, Yim Myung-ok (L), Lee Ju-ah, Kim Su-ji, Jung Dae-young, Park Eun-jin, Kang So-hwi, Kim Yeong-yeon Lee Jae-yeong, Moon Jung-won, Lee Da-yeong, Oh Ji-young (L), Lee Won-jeong, Jeon Ji-yun, Lee Na-yeon, Han Soo-ji, Ha Hye-jin, Kim Hyun-Jeong, Choi Eun-ji Head coach: Stefano Lavarini.
- 2021 FIVB Volleyball Women's Nations League[1]
  Kim Yeon-koung (C), Lee So-young, Yeom Hye-seon, Han Da-hye (L), Kim Da-in, Ahn Hye-jin, Park Eun-jin, Oh Ji-young (L), Han Song-yi, Park Jeong-ah, Yang Hyo-jin, Yuk Seo-young, Jeong Ji-yun, Pyo Seung-ju Head coach: Stefano Lavarini.
- 2022 FIVB Volleyball Women's Nations League[1]
  Park Jeong-ah (C), Yeum Hye-seon, Han Da-hye (L), Noh Ran (L), Lee Seon-woo, Kang So-hwi, Jung Ho-young, Lee Ju-ah, Go Ye-rim, Park Hye-min, Lee Da-hyeon, Hwang Min-kyoung, Lee Han-bi, Park Hye-jin, Choi Jeong-min, Kim Hee-jin Head coach: Cesar Hernandez Gonzalez.
- 2023 FIVB Volleyball Women's Nations League[1]
  Park Jeong-ah (C), Lee Ju-ah, Yeom Hye-seon, Kim Da-in, Park Eun-jin, Shin Yeong-yeong, Moon Jung-won, Lee Da-hyeon, Jeong Ji-yun, Jung Ho-young, Kim Mi-youn, Pyo Seung-ju, Moon Ji-yun, Kang So-hwi Head coach: Cesar Hernandez Gonzalez.

== Head-to-head record ==
This page shows South Korea women's national volleyball team's Head-to-head record at the Volleyball at the Summer Olympics, FIVB Women's Volleyball Nations League.

Opponent	GP	MW	ML	SW	SL
Argentina	2	1	1	3	3
Belgium	3	1	2	5	6
Brazil	14	2	12	9	37
Bulgaria	3	0	3	4	9
Cameroon	1	1	0	3	0
Canada	5	2	3	6	11
China	9	1	8	11	24
Croatia	2	0	2	1	6
Cuba	2	1	1	3	5
Czechoslovakia	1	1	0	3	1
Dominican Republic	7	2	5	7	19
East Germany	2	2	0	6	3
France	1	1	0	3	2
Germany	6	2	4	7	13
Greece	1	1	0	3	1
Hungary	2	2	0	6	1
Italy	8	2	6	9	21
Japan	17	5	12	17	39
Kenya	2	2	0	6	0
Mexico	1	1	0	3	0
Netherlands	8	0	8	4	24
North Korea	1	0	1	0	3
Peru	3	1	2	5	7
Poland	8	1	7	5	22
Romania	1	0	1	0	3
Russia	6	1	5	5	15
Serbia	7	2	5	7	17
Soviet Union	5	0	5	2	15
Thailand	6	3	3	10	12
Turkey	8	1	7	7	23
Ukraine	1	1	0	3	0
United States	12	2	10	13	31
West Germany	2	2	0	6	0
Total	157	44	113	182	373

== See also ==
- V-League
- South Korea men's national volleyball team
