= Gim Se-yeong =

Gim Se-yeong (Korean: 김세영) may refer to:

- Kim Se-young (Hanja: 金洗瑩, born 1981), South Korean volleyball player
- Kim Sei-young (Hanja: 金世煐, born 1993), South Korean golfer
- Kim Se-young, known as Procxin (born 1995), Korean League of Legends player
