= Nam Jie-youn =

South Korean volleyball player (born 1983)

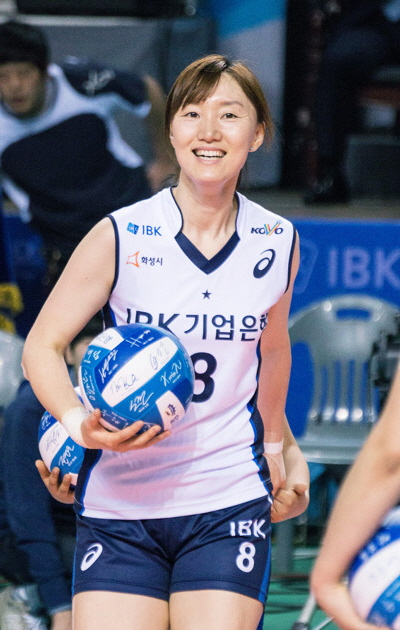

Personal information
- Nationality: South Korean
- Born: May 25, 1983 (age 43); Gangneung, South Korea
- Height: 1.72 m (5 ft 7 1/2 in)
- Weight: 63 kg (139 lb)
- Spike: 285 cm (112 in)
- Block: 273 cm (107 in)

Volleyball information
- Position: Libero
- Current club: Hwaseong IBK Altos (retired)
- Number: 8

Career
Years	Teams
2001–2012	GS Caltex Seoul KIXX
2012–2018	Hwaseong IBK Altos

National team
2003–2016	South Korea
Honours
Asian Games
Gold medal – first place	2014 Incheon	Women
Silver medal – second place	2010 Guangzhou	Women

- Nam Jie-youn
- Hangul: 남지연
- Hanja: 南智軟
- RR: Nam Jiyeon
- MR: Nam Chiyŏn

Nam Jie-youn (born May 25, 1983 in Seoul) is a former South Korean volleyball player, who played as a libero. She was a member of the Women's National Team. She plays for Hwaseong IBK Altos. She was part of the silver medal winning team at the 2010 Asian Games.

At the end of the 2017-18 season, she announced her retirement of the courts. She is currently the press officer of Hwaseong IBK Altos.

== Awards ==
=== Individuals ===
- 2003 World Grand Prix "Best Digger"
- 2011 Asian Championship "Best Libero"
- 2011 World Cup "Best Libero"
- 2015 Asian Championship "Best Libero"

Awards
Preceded by (South Korea) Kim Hae-ran	Best Libero of Asian Championship; 2015	Succeeded by (Philippines) Dawn Nicole Macandili (Japan) Mako Kobata
