= Lee Yun-hui =

South Korean volleyball player (born 1980)

Lee Yun-Hui

Personal information
- Nationality: South Korean
- Born: 8 October 1980 (age 46)
- Height: 1.81 m (5 ft 11 in)
- Weight: 74 kg (163 lb)

National team
2000	South Korea

Lee Yun-Hui (Korean: 이윤희; born 8 October 1980) is a retired South Korean female volleyball player. She was part of the South Korea women's national volleyball team.

She competed with the national team at the 2000 Summer Olympics in Sydney, Australia, finishing 8th.

== See also ==
- South Korea at the 2000 Summer Olympics
