= Oh Ji-young =

South Korean volleyball player (born 1988)

Oh Ji-Young

Personal information
- Full name: Oh Ji-Young
- Nickname: Oh-Ji-Gu-Young
- Nationality: South Korean
- Born: 11 July 1988 (age 38); Daegu, South Korea
- Height: 1.70 m (5 ft 7 in)
- Weight: 68 kg (150 lb)
- Spike: 275 cm (108 in)
- Block: 266 cm (105 in)

Volleyball information
- Position: Libero
- Number: 9 (club & national team)

Career
| Years | Teams |
|---|---|
| 2006 – 2016 | (South Korea) Gimcheon Hi-pass |
| 2017 – 2021 | (South Korea) Daejeon KGC |
| 2021 – 2022 | (South Korea) GS Caltex Seoul KIXX |
| 2022 - | (South Korea) Gwangju AI Peppers |

National team
| 2010–2021 | South Korea |

Oh Ji-young
Medal record

Women's volleyball

Representing South Korea

Asian Games
| Silver medal – second place | 2010 Guangzhou | team |

Oh Ji-young (Korean: 오지영; Hanja: 吳智永; born 11 July 1988) is a South Korean professional volleyball player. She was part of the silver medal-winning team at the 2010 Asian Games. She was part of the South Korea women's national volleyball team at the 2020 Summer Olympics. The team finished at fourth place in 2020.

In the summer of 2021 she moved to GS Caltex Seoul KIXX.
