= Yim Myung-ok =

South Korean volleyball player (born 1986)

Personal information
- Nationality: South Korean
- Born: 5 May 1986 (age 40)
- Height: 176 cm (5 ft 9 in)
- Weight: 65 kg (143 lb)
- Spike: 278 cm (109 in)
- Block: 266 cm (105 in)

Volleyball information
- Number: 8

Career
- Years: Team
- 2005–2015 2015–present: KT&G; Korea Expressway Corporation Hi-Pass

National team
- Years: Team
- 2010: South Korea

Yim Myung-ok (Korean: 임명옥; Hanja: 林明玉; born 15 March 1986) is a South Korean professional volleyball player. She was part of the silver medal winning team at the 2010 Asian Games. She was part of the South Korea national team at the 2010 World Championship.
