= Stefano Lavarini =

Italian volleyball coach (born 1979)

- Lavarini in 2026

Personal information
- Nationality: Italian
- Born: 17 January 1979 (age 47) Omegna, Italy

Stefano Lavarini (Omegna, Italy, 17 January 1979) is an Italian volleyball coach who is the head coach of the Poland women's national volleyball team since 2022, and of the Turkish club Fenerbahce. He has also coached clubs in Italy, Brazil and Turkey, as well as the South Korea women's national volleyball team.

== Coaching career ==
Lavarini began his coaching career in the youth system of Omegna Pallavolo in 1995. He subsequently worked with AGIL Volley in Novara and at Chieri, where he coached youth teams and served as an assistant coach. In 2007, Lavarini joined the Italian Volleyball Federation's Club Italia programme. He was an assistant coach of the Italy women's under-19 national team that won the 2008 Women's Junior European Volleyball Championship.

Later in 2010, he joined Volley Bergamo becoming head coach of the club in 2012. During his five seasons as head coach, Bergamo won the Coppa Italia in 2016. From 2017 to 2019, he coached Minas Tênis Clube in Brazil, winning the Brazilian Women's Volleyball Superliga in 2019, as well as two South American Club Championships.

Lavarini subsequently coached UYBA Volley Busto Arsizio and Igor Gorgonzola Novara. From 2019 to 2021, he served as the head coach of the South Korea women's national volleyball team, helping the team to qualify in 2020 Summer Olympics.

In January 2022, Lavarini was appointed head coach of the Poland women's national volleyball team.

He has coached Fenerbahçe women's volleyball during the 2023–24 season, and the next year he became head coach of Vero Volley Milano. For the season 2026-2027 he returned to Turkey to coach Fenerbahçe women's volleyball team.

In September 2026, he led Poland to the 4th place in the 2026 Women's European Volleyball Championship, held in Istanbul, losing to the Serbia in the bronze-medal final.

In September 2026, the Turkish club, Fenerbahçe Medicana confirmed the return of Stefano Lavarini as head coach of their women’s volleyball team ahead of the 2026/27 season.
