= Yang Hyo-jin =

South Korean volleyball player

Yang Hyo-Jin
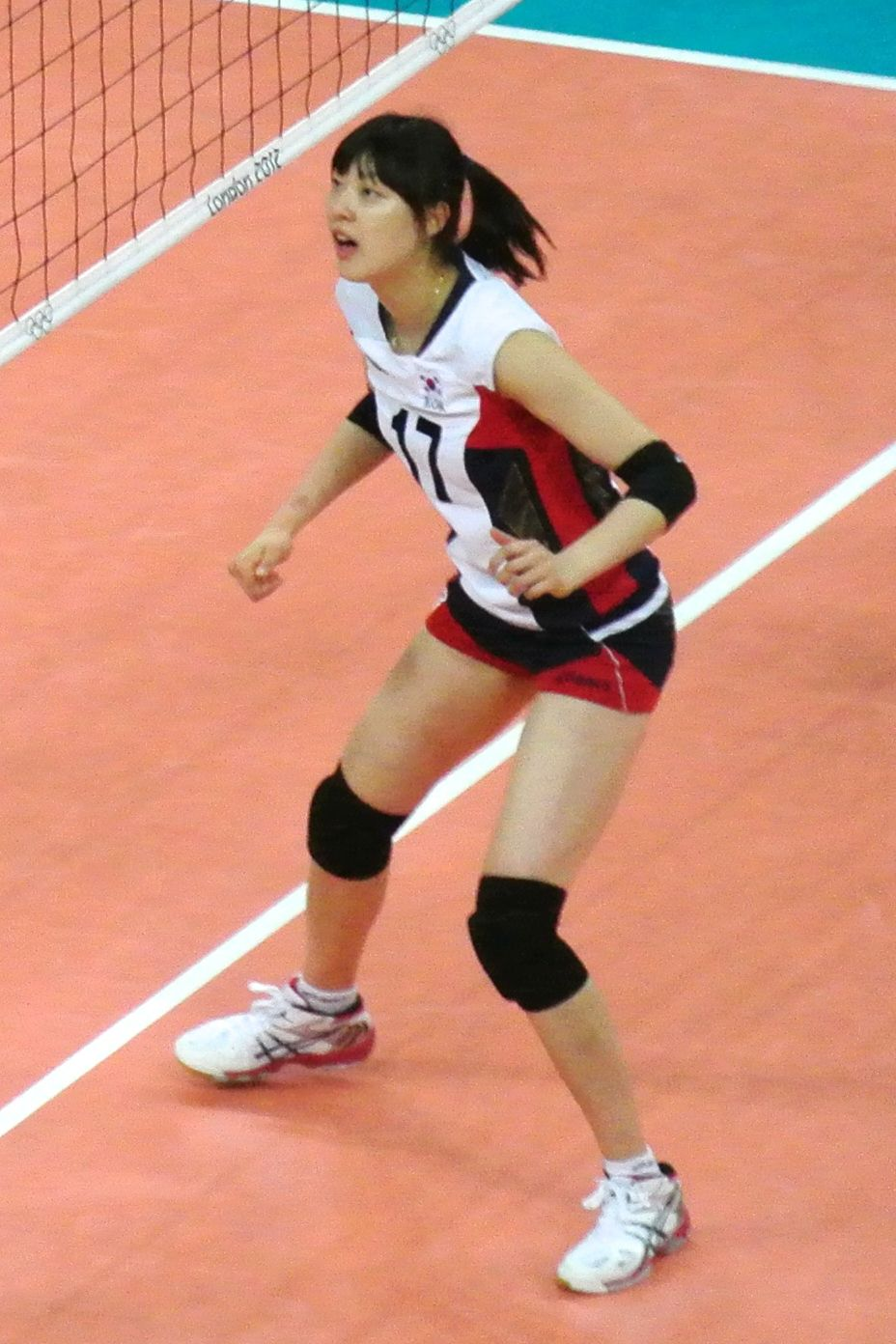
- Hyo-Jin at the 2012 Summer Olympics against Japan

Personal information
- Nationality: South Korean
- Born: 14 December 1989 (age 36) Busan, South Korea
- Height: 190 cm (6 ft 3 in)
- Weight: 70 kg (154 lb)
- Spike: 340 cm (134 in)
- Block: 338 cm (133 in)

Volleyball information
- Position: Middle Blocker
- Current club: Hyundai E&C
- Number: 17 (former),14 (current)

Career
- Years: Team
- 2007–: Hyundai E&C

National team
- Years: Team
- 2008–2021: South Korea
Honours
Women's volleyball
Representing South Korea
Asian Games
Gold medal – first place	2014 Incheon
Silver medal – second place	2010 Guangzhou
Bronze medal – third place	2018 Jakarta-Palembang
Asian Championship
Silver medal – second place	2015 Tianjin
Bronze medal – third place	2013 Nakhon Ratchasima
Bronze medal – third place	2017 Metro Manila
Bronze medal – third place	2019 Seoul
Asian Cup
Silver medal – second place	2008 Nakhon Ratchasima
Silver medal – second place	2014 Shenzhen
Bronze medal – third place	2010 Taicang
- Updated on 17 November 2019

Yang Hyo-Jin (Korean: 양효진; Hanja: 梁孝眞; born 14 December 1989) is a South Korean volleyball player. She currently plays for the Korean club Hyundai Engineering & Construction Hillstate. She is a former member of the South Korea women's national volleyball team which placed fourth in the 2012 Summer Olympics and 2020 Summer Olympics and fifth in the 2016 Summer Olympics.

She retired from the South Korea women's national volleyball team after playing at the 2020 Summer Olympics.

== Club career ==
- (South Korea) Hyundai Engineering & Construction Hillstate (2007–)

=== Team ===
- Korean V-League
  - Champion (2): 2010–11, 2015–16
  - Runners-up (2): 2009–10, 2011–12
- KOVO Cup
  - Champion (2): 2014, 2019
  - Runners-up (3): 2009, 2013, 2015

=== Individuals ===
- Korean V-League Final "Most Valuable Player" (1): 2015–16
- Korean V-League "Most Valuable Player" (1): 2019-20
- Korean V-League "Best Blocker" (5): 2009–10, 2010–11, 2011–12, 2012–13, 2013–14
- Korean V-League "Best Spiker" (1): 2013–14
- Korean V-League "Best 7" (7): 2014–15, 2015–16, 2016–17, 2017–18, 2018–19, 2019–20, 2020–21
- Korean V-League "MVP of the Month" (1): 2009–10 February
- Korean V-League "MVP of the Round" (6): 2011–12 4R, 2012–13 3R, 2012–13 4R, 2015–16 2R, 3R, 2019-20 4R

== International career ==
=== National team ===
- Summer Olympics
  - 2012 – 4th Place
  - 2016 – 5th Place
  - 2020 – 4th Place
- FIVB World Championship
  - 2010 – 13th
  - 2018 – 17th
- FIVB World Cup
  - 2015 – 6th
  - 2019 – 6th
- FIVB Volleyball Nations League
  - 2018 – 12th
  - 2021 – 15th Place
- FIVB World Grand Prix
  - 2009 – 12th
  - 2012 – 14th
  - 2014 – 8th
  - 2017 – 14th
- FIVB World Grand Champions Cup
  - 2009 – 5th
- Asian Games
  - 2010 – 2nd
  - 2014 – 1st
  - 2018 – 3rd
- Asian Championship
  - 2009 – 4th
  - 2013 – 3rd
  - 2015 – 2nd
  - 2017 – 3rd
  - 2019 – 3rd
- AVC Cup
  - 2008 – 2nd
  - 2010 – 3rd
  - 2012 – 6th
  - 2014 – 2nd

=== Individuals ===
- 2009 FIVB World Grand Champions Cup – "Best Blocker"
- 2010 AVC Asian Cup – "Best Blocker"
- 2012 FIVB World Olympic Qualification Tournament – "Best Middle Blocker"
- 2014 AVC Asian Cup – "Best Middle Blocker"
- 2016 FIVB World Olympic Qualification Tournament – "Best Middle Blocker"
