= Han Da-hye =

South Korean volleyball player (born 1996)

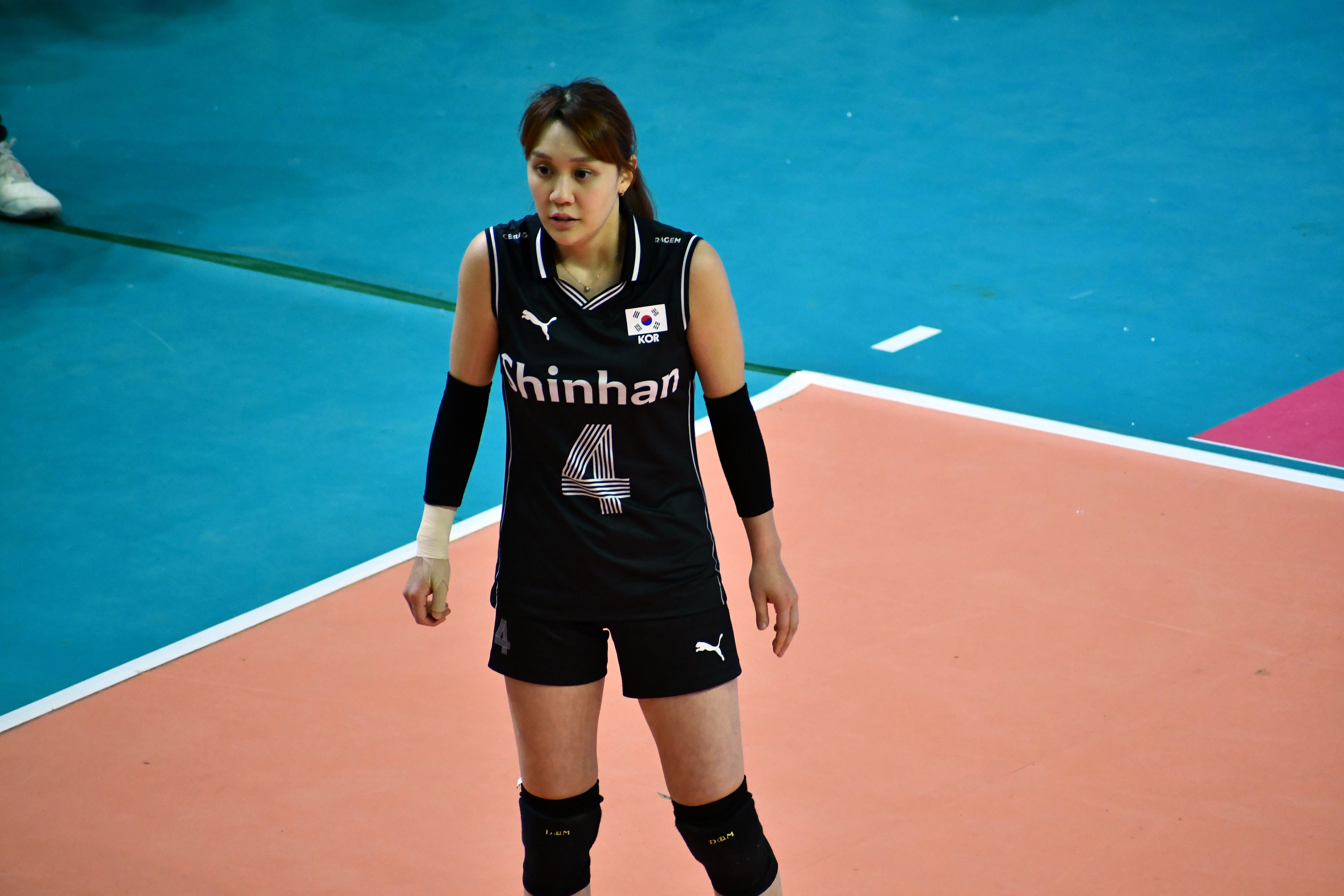
- Han Da-hye in 2024

Personal information
- Nationality: South Korean
- Born: 28 February 1995 (age 31); Seoul
- Height: 164 cm (65 in)
- Weight: 50 kg (110 lb)

Volleyball information
- Position: Libero
- Number: 5 (national team)

Career
Years	Teams
2013 -	GS Caltex Seoul KIXX

National team
2021 -	South Korea

Han Da-hye (Korean: 한다혜; born 28 February 1995) is a South Korean volleyball player. She is part of the South Korea women's national volleyball team.

She participated in the 2021 FIVB Volleyball Women's Nations League. On a club level she was 5th pick in the third round of the 2013-2014 draft, signing for GS Caltex Seoul KIXX.
