= Baek Mok-hwa =

South Korean volleyball player (born 1989)

Personal information
- Full name: Baek Mok-hwa
- Nickname: Moka
- Nationality: South Korean
- Born: 30 August 1989 (age 37); Gwangju, South Korea
- Height: 177 cm (70 in)
- Weight: 61 kg (134 lb)
- Spike: 280 cm (110 in)
- Block: 277 cm (109 in)

Volleyball information
- Position: Outside, Opposite, Libero

Career
Years	Teams
2007-2008; 2008-2016; 2016-2017; 2018-2020	Hyundai E&C; Daejeon KGC; Daegu City; Hwaseong IBK Altos

National team
2014-2015	South Korea
Honours
Asian Games
Gold medal – first place	2014 Incheon	team

Baek Mok-hwa (Korean: 백목화; born 30 August 1989) is a South Korean female volleyball player. She is part of the South Korea women's national volleyball team.

She participated in the 2014 FIVB Volleyball World Grand Prix. On club level she played for Korea Ginseng Corporation in 2014.
