= Kim Sa-nee =

South Korean volleyball player (born 1981)

Personal information
- Full name: Kim Sa-nee
- Nationality: South Korean
- Born: 21 June 1981 (age 45); Seoul, South Korea
- Height: 1.82 m (6 ft 0 in)
- Weight: 72 kg (159 lb)

Volleyball information
- Position: Setter
- Current club: Hwaseong IBK Altos
- Number: 9

Career
Years	Teams
1999−2007; 2007−2010; 2010−2013; 2013−2014; 2014−2017	(South Korea) Seongnam KEC (South Korea) Daejeon KGC (South Korea) Incheon Heungkuk Life (Azerbaijan) Lokomotiv Baku (South Korea) Hwaseong IBK

National team
1999−2012	South Korea
Honours
Women's volleyball
Representing South Korea
Asian Games
Silver medal – second place	2002 Busan	Team
Silver medal – second place	2010 Guangzhou	Team
World Junior Championship
Bronze medal – third place	1999 Saskatoon	Team

Kim Sa-nee (Korean: 김사니; Hanja: 金사니; born 21 June 1981) is a South Korean volleyball player.

Kim was born in Seoul. She played for the South Korea women's national volleyball team. She participated in the 2001 FIVB World Grand Prix. She was part of the silver medal winning team at the 2010 Asian Games. She has also twice competed with the South Korean team at the Olympics, finishing in fifth in 2004, and fourth in 2012.
