= Na Hyeon-jeong =

South Korean volleyball player (born 1990)

Personal information
- Nationality: South Korean
- Born: 10 March 1990 (age 36)
- Height: 163 cm (64 in)
- Weight: 54 kg (119 lb)
- Spike: 257 cm (101 in)
- Block: 250 cm (98 in)

Volleyball information
- Number: 14 (national team)

Career
Years	Teams
2008–2018	GS Caltex

National team
2009–2018	South Korea

- Na Hyeon-jeong
- Hangul: 나현정
- Hanja: 羅賢貞
- RR: Na Hyeonjeong
- MR: Na Hyŏnjŏng

Na Hyeon-jeong (Korean: 나현정, born 10 March 1990) is a South Korean female volleyball player. She is part of the South Korea women's national volleyball team.

She participated in the 2014 FIVB Volleyball World Grand Prix, and the 2015 FIVB Volleyball World Grand Prix. On club level she played for GS Caltex in 2014.

== Personal life ==
Na Hyeon-jeong attended Seoul Jungang Girls' High School.
