= Hong Ji-yeon =

South Korean volleyball player (born 1970)

Personal information
- Nationality: South Korean
- Born: 8 September 1970 (age 56)
- Height: 187 cm (6 ft 2 in)
- Spike: 314 cm (124 in)
- Block: 304 cm (120 in)

Volleyball information
- Number: 11 (national team)

National team
- Years: Team
- 1998: South Korea

- Hong Ji-yeon
- Hangul: 홍지연
- Hanja: 洪知延
- RR: Hong Jiyeon
- MR: Hong Chiyŏn

Hong Ji-yeon (born 8 September 1970) is a retired South Korean female volleyball player.

She was part of the South Korea women's national volleyball team at the 1998 FIVB Volleyball Women's World Championship in Japan. She participated in the 1996 Summer Olympics.
