= Kang Hye-mi =

South Korean volleyball player (born 1974)

Personal information
- Nationality: South Korea
- Born: 27 April 1974 (age 52); Busan, South Korea
- Height: 1.73 m (5 ft 8 in)
- Weight: 62 kg (137 lb)
- Spike: 300 cm (120 in)
- Block: 285 cm (112 in)

Volleyball information
- Position: Setter
- Current club: Hyundai Seoul
Honours
Women's volleyball
Representing South Korea
Asian Games
Silver medal – second place	1997 Manila	Team
Silver medal – second place	1998 Bangkok	Team
Silver medal – second place	1999 Hong Kong	Team
Silver medal – second place	2002 Busan	Team

Kang Hye-Mi (Korean: 강혜미; born April 27, 1974, in Busan) is a female volleyball player. Playing as a setter she was one of the key players of the Women's National Team during the 1990s and the early 2000s (decade).

She represented South Korea at three consecutive Summer Olympics (1996, 2000 and 2004), and the 2001 FIVB World Grand Prix, and 2003 FIVB Women's World Cup

Kang retired in 2004, after then she became a high school teacher.

== Honours ==
- 1994 FIVB World Grand Prix — 5th place
- 1994 World Championship — 4th place
- 1996 FIVB World Grand Prix — 6th place
- 1996 Olympic Games — 6th place
- 1997 FIVB World Grand Prix — 3rd place
- 1997 World Grand Champions Cup — 6th place
- 1997 Asian Championship — 2nd place
- 1998 FIVB World Grand Prix — 6th place
- 1998 World Championship — 9th place
- 1999 FIVB World Grand Prix — 6th place
- 1999 FIVB World Cup — 4th place
- 1999 Asian Championship — 2nd place
- 2000 FIVB World Grand Prix — 5th place
- 2000 Olympic Games — 8th place
- 2001 FIVB World Grand Prix — 7th place
- 2002 World Championship — 6th place
- 2003 FIVB World Cup — 9th place
- 2004 Olympic Qualification Tournament — 2nd place (qualified)
- 2004 Olympic Games — 5th place
