= Hwang Min-kyoung =

South Korean volleyball player (born 1990)

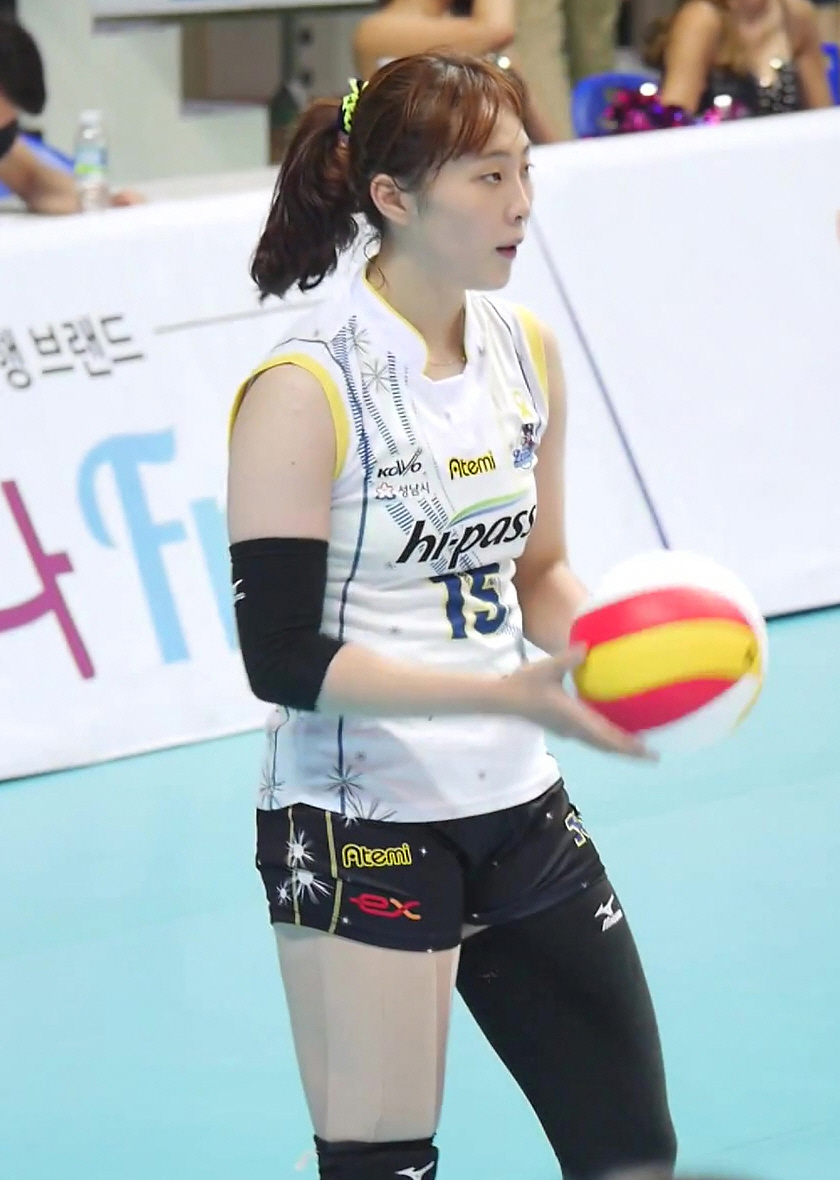

Personal information
- Nationality: South Korean
- Born: 2 June 1990 (age 36)
- Height: 174 cm (69 in)
- Weight: 64 kg (141 lb)
- Spike: 290 cm (114 in)
- Block: 282 cm (111 in)

Volleyball information
- Position: Opposite Spiker / Outside Spiker
- Number: 15

Career
Years	Teams
2008-2016	Korea Expressway Corporation Hi-Pass
2016-2017	GS Caltex Seoul KIXX
2017-2023	Suwon Hyundai Engineering & Construction Hillstate
2023-	Hwaseong IBK Altos

National team
2017-	South Korea

Hwang Min-kyoung (born 2 June 1990) is a South Korean professional volleyball player. She is part of the South Korea women's national volleyball team. At club level, she plays for Suwon Hyundai Engineering & Construction Hillstate, where she is also the team captain, a role she has held for three years.

== Career ==
She became a volleyball player from her elementary school final year. She participated at the 2011 FIVB Volleyball World Grand Prix, the 2017 FIVB Volleyball World Grand Prix, and the 2017 FIVB Volleyball Women's World Grand Champions Cup.

== Clubs ==
- (South Korea) Korea Expressway Corporation Hi-Pass, 2008-2016
- (South Korea) GS Caltex Seoul KIXX, 2016-2017
- (South Korea) Suwon Hyundai Engineering & Construction Hillstate, 2017-2023
- (South Korea) Hwaseong IBK Altos, 2023-
