= Pyo Seung-ju =

South Korean volleyball player (born 1992)

Pyo Seung-Ju
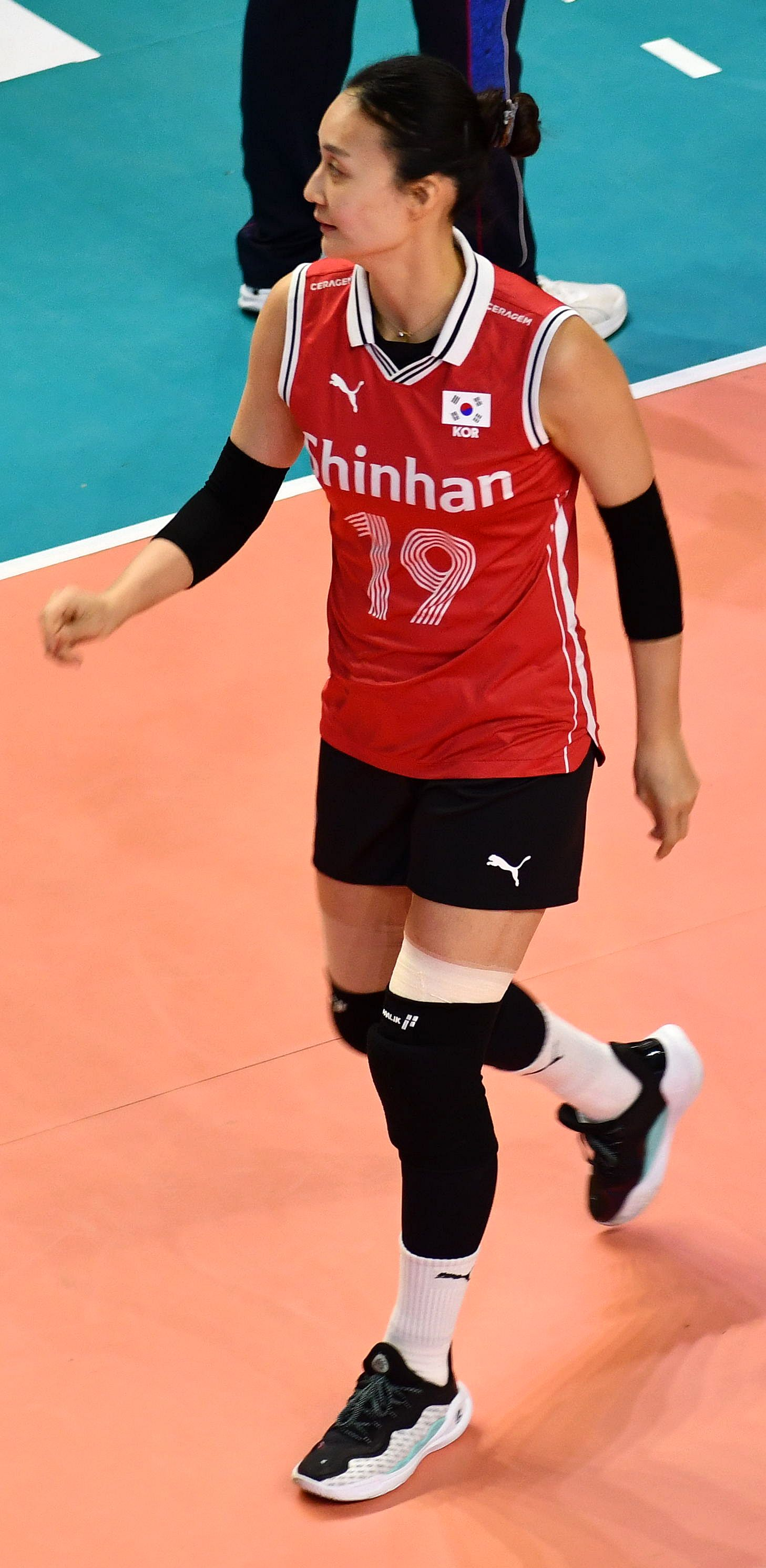
- Pyo Seung-Ju in 2024

Personal information
- Nationality: South Korean
- Born: 7 August 1992 (age 34); Ulsan, South Korea
- Height: 181 cm (71 in)
- Weight: 72 kg (159 lb)
- Spike: 290 cm (114 in)
- Block: 270 cm (106 in)

Volleyball information
- Position: Outside
- Current club: (South Korea) Daejeon KGC
- Number: 18 (national team), 19 (club)

Career
Years	Teams
2010-2014	(South Korea) Gimcheon Korea Expressway Corporation Hi-pass
2014-2019	(South Korea) GS Caltex Seoul KIXX
2019-2024	(South Korea) Hwaseong IBK Altos
2024-	(South Korea) Daejeon KGC

National team
2014	South Korea

Pyo Seung-ju
Medal record

Women's volleyball

Representing South Korea

Asian Championship
Bronze medal – third place	2019 Seoul	

- Pyo Seung-ju
- Hangul: 표승주
- RR: Pyo Seungju
- MR: P'yo Sŭngju

Pyo Seung-Ju (born 7 August 1992) is a South Korean volleyball player. She is part of the South Korea women's national volleyball team.

She participated in the 2014 FIVB Volleyball World Grand Prix. On club level she played for GS Caltex in 2014.
