= Priyanka Khedkar =

Indian volleyball player (born 1984)

Personal information
- Nationality: Indian
- Born: 1 November 1984 (age 41)
- Hometown: Nagpur, Maharashtra, India
- Height: 166 cm (65 in)

Career
Years	Teams
2010	Indian Railways

National team
2010	India

Priyanka Khedkar (born 1 November 1984) is a retired Indian female volleyball player. She was part of the India women's national volleyball team.

She participated at the 2010 Asian Games, and 2014 Asian Games. On club level she played for Indian Railways in 2010.
