= Chang So-yun =

South Korean volleyball player (born 1974)

Personal information
- Nationality: South Korean
- Born: November 11, 1974 (age 51); Busan, South Korea
- Hometown: Suwon
- Height: 1.84 m (6 ft 1/2 in)
- Weight: 76 kg (168 lb)
- Spike: 312 cm (123 in)
- Block: 301 cm (119 in)
- Education: Kyonggi University

Volleyball information
- Position: Middle hitter
- Current club: Ex Hi-pass Zenith
- Number: 11

Career
Years	Teams
1992–1998; 1998–2004; 2009–2012; 2013–2016	SK; Hyundai Hillstate; KGC; Ex Hi-pass Zenith

National team
1992–2004	South Korea
Honours
Women's volleyball
Representing South Korea
Volleyball at the Asian Games
Silver medal – second place	2002 Busan

- Chang So-yun
- Hangul: 장소연
- Hanja: 張少燕
- RR: Jang Soyeon
- MR: Chang Soyŏn

Chang So-yun (Korean: 장소연; Hanja: 張少燕; born November 11, 1974, in Busan, South Korea) is a volleyball player. Playing as a middle-blocker, she was one of the key players of the South Korean national team during the 1990s and the early 2000s (decade).

== Career ==
She participated at the 2001 FIVB World Grand Prix, and represented South Korea at the 1996 Summer Olympics and 2000 Summer Olympics.

In 2009, she was drafted at the age of 35 by KT&G Ariels as the 3rd rank of the first round from new player draft 2009.

== Honours ==
- 1994 FIVB World Grand Prix — 5th place
- 1994 World Championship — 4th place
- 1995 FIVB World Cup — 5th place
- 1995 Asian Championship — 2nd place
- 1996 FIVB World Grand Prix — 6th place
- 1996 Olympic Games — 6th place
- 1997 FIVB World Grand Prix — 3rd place
- 1997 World Grand Champions Cup — 6th place
- 1997 Asian Championship — 2nd place
- 1998 FIVB World Grand Prix — 6th place
- 1998 World Championship — 9th place
- 1999 FIVB World Cup — 4th place
- 1999 FIVB World Grand Prix — 6th place
- 1999 Asian Championship — 2nd place
- 2000 FIVB World Grand Prix — 5th place
- 2000 Olympic Games — 8th place
- 2000 Asian Championship — 1st place
- 2001 FIVB World Grand Prix — 7th place
- 2002 World Championship — 6th place
- 2003 FIVB World Cup — 9th place
- 2004 Olympic Qualification Tournament — 2nd place (qualified)
