= Jeong Ji-yun =

South Korean volleyball player (born 2001)

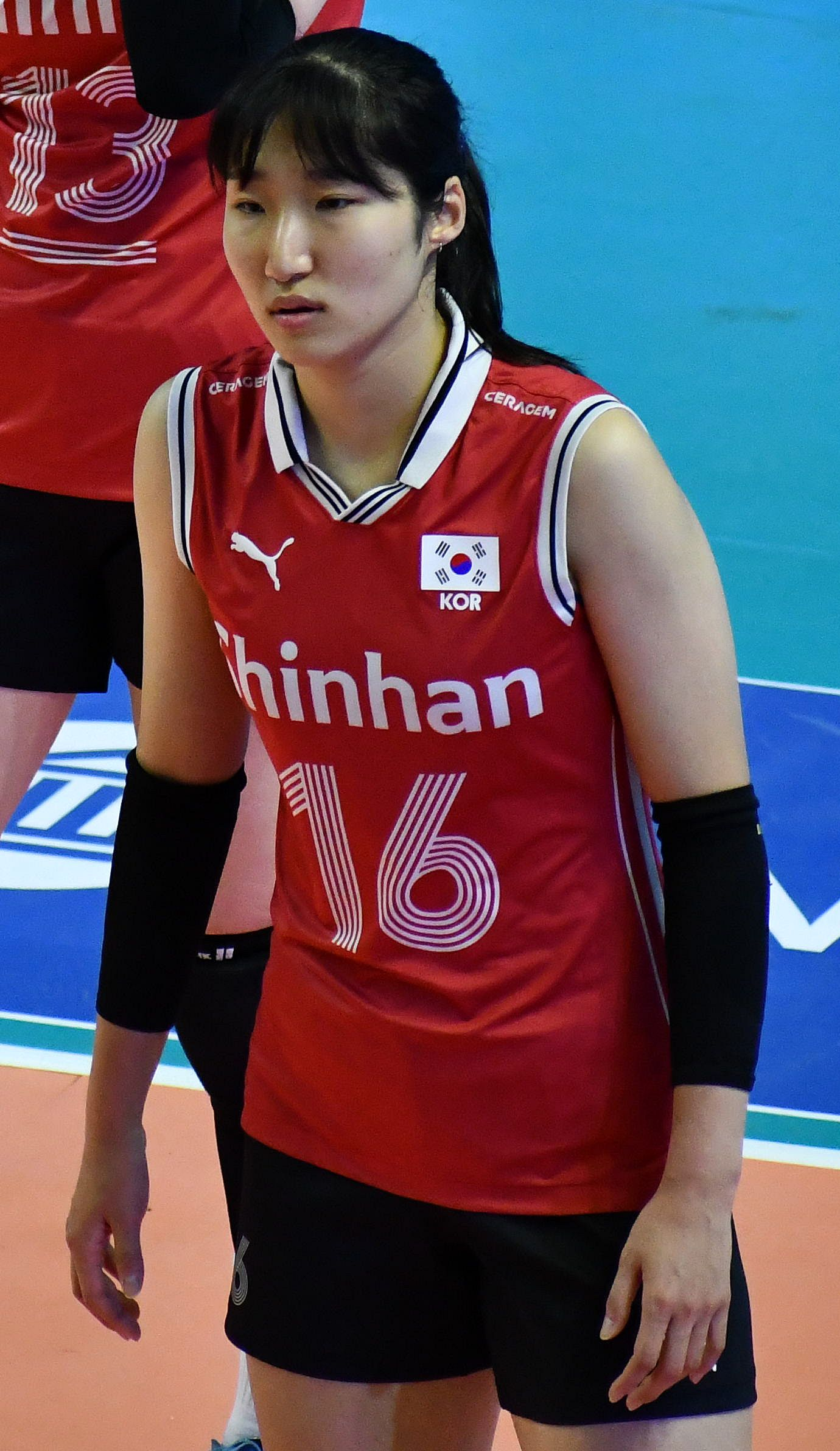
- Jeong Ji-yun in 2024

Personal information
- Nationality: South Korean
- Born: 1 January 2001 (age 25)
- Height: 180 cm (71 in)
- Weight: 71 kg (157 lb)
- Spike: 295 cm (116 in)
- Block: 280 cm (110 in)

Volleyball information
- Position: Outside hitter
- Number: 13 (club), 16 (national team)

Career
- Years: Team
- 2018 -: Hyundai E&C

National team
- Years: Team
- 2019 -: South Korea

Jeong Ji-yun (born 1 January 2001) is a South Korean volleyball player. She is part of the South Korean women's national volleyball team.

She participated in the 2017 FIVB Volleyball Girls' U18 World Championship, and 2019 FIVB Volleyball Women's Nations League.

On the club level she is playing for Hyundai E&C. She is part of the South Korea women's national volleyball team roster for the Summer Olympics 2020, where the team finished 4th place.
