= Ding Xia =

Chinese volleyball player (born 1990)

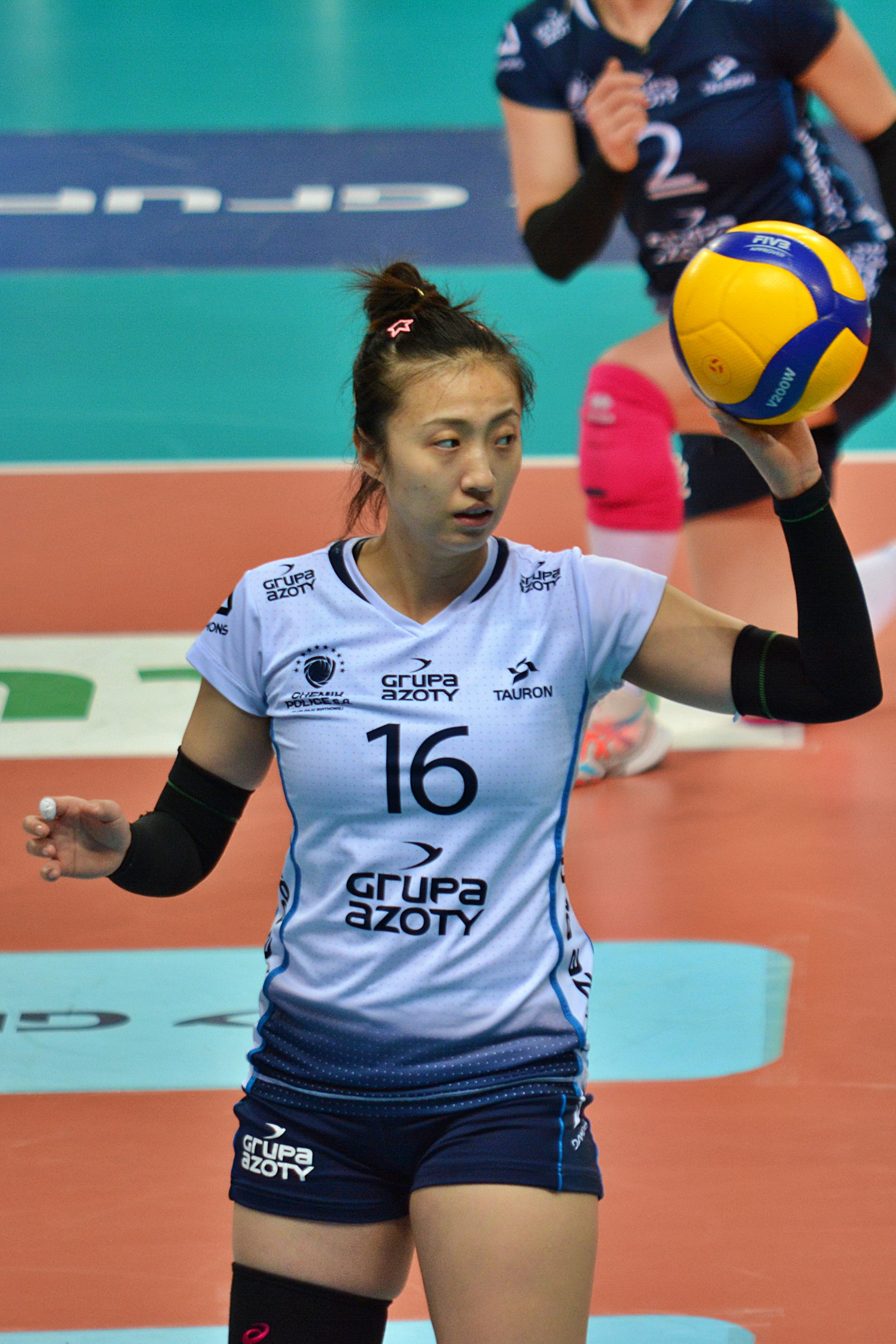
- Ding Xia at Polish League

Personal information
- Nickname: Opposite Spiker Ding (丁接应)
- Nationality: Chinese
- Born: 13 January 1990 (age 36); Hebei, China
- Hometown: Hebei, China
- Height: 1.80 m (5 ft 11 in)
- Weight: 67 kg (148 lb)
- Spike: 305 cm (120 in)
- Block: 300 cm (120 in)

Volleyball information
- Position: Setter
- Current club: Liaoning
- Number: 16 (national team), 8 (club)

Career
Years	Teams
2009–2023; 2023–2024; 2024–	(China) Liaoning (Poland) KPS Chemik Police (China) Liaoning

National team
2014–present	China
Honours
Volleyball
Olympic Games
Gold medal – first place	2016 Rio de Janeiro	Team
World Championship
Bronze medal – third place	2018 Japan	Team
FIVB World Cup
Gold medal – first place	2019 Japan	Team
Gold medal – first place	2015 Japan	Team
World Grand Champions Cup
Gold medal – first place	2017 Japan	Team
Volleyball Nations League
Bronze medal – third place	2018 Nanjing	Team
Asian Games
Gold medal – first place	2018 Jakarta-Palembang	Team
Gold medal – first place	2022 Hangzhou	Team
Silver medal – second place	2014 Incheon	Team
Asian Championship
Gold medal – first place	2015 Tianjin
AVC Cup
Gold medal – first place	2014 Shenzhen	Team

Ding Xia (Chinese: 丁霞; pinyin: Dīng Xiá, born 13 January 1990) is a Chinese volleyball player. She is the setter of the China women's national volleyball team and has been representing the team in international competitions since 2014. At the club level, she plays for the Liaoning provincial team, which she has captained since 2013. She is known for her agility and versatility on court, often utilising her strength as a left-handed setter to execute surprise spikes on second touch or from the right side of the court, thus earning her the nickname "Opposite Spiker Ding".

== Personal life ==
Ding Xia was born on 13 January 1990 in Shijiazhuang City, Hebei, China. Her father and grandparents are all employees of Shijiazhuang Car Factory. She started playing volleyball when she was ten years old in Shijiazhuang City Sports School. At the age of 17, she was selected by coaches from Liaoning women's volleyball team and left her hometown to train in the team.

== Career ==
In 2009, Ding was selected to join the China women's national volleyball under-20 team. In the same year, she participated in the 15th FIVB U20 World Championships held in Tijuana and Mexicali, Mexico from July 16 to 25, 2009.

In 2013, Ding entered the China women's national volleyball team roster for the first time, but was not required to attend trainings. In the same year, she led the Liaoning Team to a silver in the 2013 National Games of China.

In 2014, she was again included in the senior National Team roster and trained with the squad. In June 2014, she participated in the 2014 Montreux Volley Masters held in Switzerland yearly. In September, she participated in the 2014 Incheon Asian Games as part of the National B team. However, the team lost to South Korea 0-3 in the finals of the tournament and won a silver medal. As her performance at the tournaments lacked consistency, she was asked to leave the National Team temporarily.

In 2015, she returned to the National Team and stayed on throughout the summer, earning herself an opportunity to represent the team at the 2015 FIVB World Cup. She put up a stellar performance during the tournament. As a substitute, she was often called upon when the team encountered difficult situations and needed a change in rhythm and did so successfully, helping the team achieve gold in the tournament.

Ding Xia's performance in the World Cup earned her a spot in the Rio Olympics squad the following year where, along with veteran setter Wei Qiuyue, she represented team China in her first Olympic Games.

Together with teammates, Ding Xia put up a phenomenal performance in the 2016 Rio Olympic Games. After a disappointing performance in the preliminary rounds, the team achieved a surprising turnaround, beating gold medal favourite and host Brazil in the quarter-finals, much to the shock of 20,000 spectators. The team then narrowly beat the Netherlands 3-1 in the semi-finals and Serbia in the finals to win their third Olympic gold medal in history.

After the Rio Olympics, fellow setter and veteran Wei Qiuyue retired due to knee injury and Ding Xia became the main setter of the National Team. In 2017, Ding Xia participated in the World Grand Champions Cup, successfully helping her team win the championship title, beating rivals USA, Brazil and Russia along the way.

In September 2018, Ding Xia participated in her second Asian Games, held in Jakarta, Indonesia. Despite the absence of key player Zhang Changning, Team China displayed their absolute dominance in Asia at the tournament, winning eight consecutive matches with 3-0 scores to achieve gold. Their opponents included South Korea, Japan, Thailand and the Philippines. Later that month, Ding Xia flew with her team to Japan to participate in the FIVB World Championships. After 4 consecutive wins, China lost to Italy 1-3 in the first round of the pool stage. In the second round, China beat their main rival USA, securing a spot in the Final Six one round in advance. In the Final Six, China secured victories against the USA and Netherlands. However, the team lost to Italy again in the semi-finals after a grueling five set match, before winning the Netherlands in the bronze medal match, managing to secure a spot on the podium.

The following year, Ding Xia represented China in the 2019 FIVB Volleyball Nations League. In the preliminary rounds, the main Chinese team faced-off rival team Italy at the Hong Kong Coliseum. In front of a rambunctious home crowd, team China lost 0-2 to Italy, before winning three consecutive sets to secure a 3-2 victory. In August, Ding Xia participated in the 2019 FIVB Intercontinental Olympic Qualification Tournament. In front of a home crowd in Jiangmen, China, the national team beat European opponents Czech Republic, Germany and Turkey to win a ticket to the 2020 Tokyo Olympics. In September 2019, Ding Xia took part in the 2019 FIVB Women's World Cup held in Japan. With the absence of rivals Italy and key players from Serbia, the team powered to a gold medal finish with 11 consecutive wins, dropping only 3 sets along the way, beating opponents such as USA, Brazil and Japan. Ding Xia was only awarded the Best Setter of the tournament.

Awards
Preceded by (Thailand) Nootsara Tomkom	Best Setter of FIVB World Grand Prix; 2017	Succeeded by -
Preceded by (Dominican Republic) Niverka Marte	Best Setter of FIVB World Cup; 2019	Succeeded by Incumbent
