= Lee Da-hyeon =

South Korean volleyball player (born 2001)

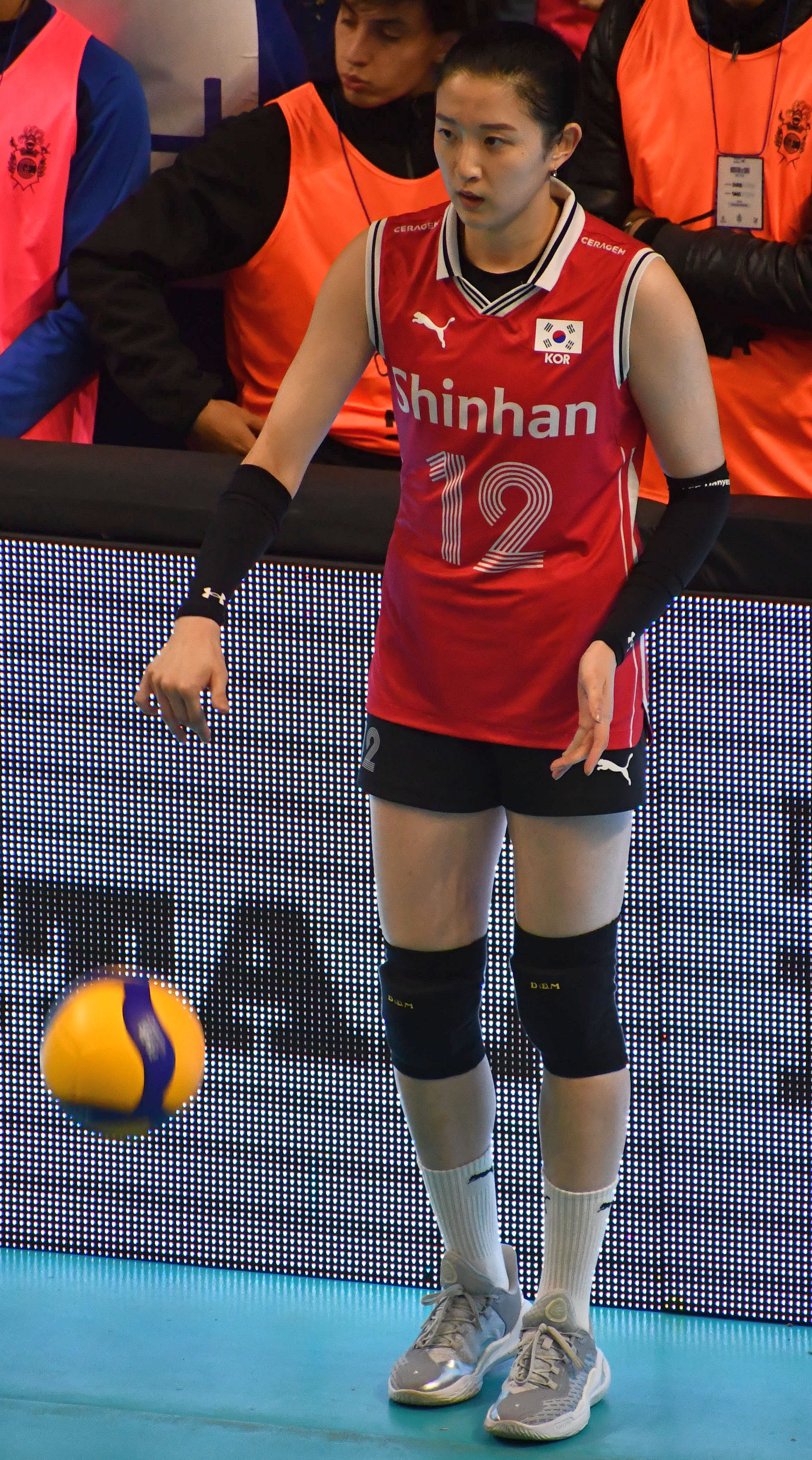
- Lee Da-hyeon in 2024

Personal information
- Nationality: South Korean
- Born: 11 November 2001 (age 25) Seoul
- Height: 185 cm (73 in)
- Weight: 70 kg (154 lb)

Volleyball information
- Position: Middle Blocker
- Number: 2 (national team)

Career
- Years: Team
- 2019 - 2025: (South Korea) Suwon Hyundai Hillstate
- 2025 - 2026: (South Korea) Incheon Heungkuk Life Pink Spiders
- 2026 -: (Japan) NEC Red Rockets Kawasaki

National team
- Years: Team
- 2021 -: South Korea

Lee Da-hyeon (Korean: 이다현; born 11 November 2001) is a South Korean female volleyball player. She is part of the South Korea women's national volleyball team.

She participated in the 2021 FIVB Volleyball Women's Nations League. On a club level she was 2nd pick in the first round of the 2019-2020 draft, signing for Suwon Hyundai Hillstate.
