= Koo Ki-lan =

South Korean volleyball player (born 1977)

Koo Ki-Lan

Personal information
- Full name: Koo Ki-Lan
- Nationality: South Korea
- Born: March 10, 1977 (age 49); Masan, Gyeongsangnam-do
- Height: 1.70 m (5 ft 7 in)
- Weight: 64 kg (141 lb)
- Spike: 274 cm (108 in)
- Block: 264 cm (104 in)

Volleyball information
- Position: Libero

Career
Years	Teams
1995-2008	Incheon Heungkuk Life Pink Spiders

National team
2000-2006	South Korea
Honours
Asian Games
Silver medal – second place	2002 Busan	Women
- Last updated: March 2010

Koo Ki-Lan (born March 10, 1977) is a retired female volleyball player who represented South Korea at the 2000 Summer Olympics in Sydney, Australia, when the women's national team finished in 8th place. Two years later, at the World Championship in Germany, she was named Best Digger and Best Receiver. She retired in 2008 due to injury.

== Honours ==
- 2000 FIVB World Grand Prix — 5th place
- 2000 Olympic Games — 8th place
- 2001 World Grand Champions Cup — 6th place
- 2002 World Championship — 6th place
- 2002 Asian Games — Silver medal
- 2003 FIVB World Cup — 9th place

== Individual awards ==
- 2002 World Championship - "Best Digger"
- 2002 World Championship - "Best Receiver"
