= Yan Ni (volleyball) =

Chinese volleyball player

Personal information
- Nickname: Manager (掌柜)
- Nationality: Chinese
- Born: 2 March 1987 (age 39) Liaoning, China
- Height: 1.92 m (6 ft 4 in)
- Weight: 74 kg (163 lb)
- Spike: 317 cm (125 in)
- Block: 306 cm (120 in)

Volleyball information
- Position: Middle blocker
- Current club: Retired
- Number: 17 (national team), 2 (club)

National team
- Years: Team
- 2009 2014–2021: China
Honours
Volleyball
Olympic Games
Gold medal – first place	2016 Rio de Janeiro	Team
World Championship
Bronze medal – third place	2018 Japan	Team
FIVB World Cup
Gold medal – first place	2019 Japan	Team
Gold medal – first place	2015 Japan	Team
World Grand Champions Cup
Gold medal – first place	2017 Japan	Team
Volleyball Nations League
Bronze medal – third place	2018 Nanjing	Team
Asian Games
Gold medal – first place	2018 Jakarta-Palembang
Silver medal – second place	2014 Incheon
Asian Championship
Gold medal – first place	2015 Tianjin
AVC Cup
Gold medal – first place	2014 Shenzhen	Team

Yan Ni (Chinese: 颜妮; pinyin: Yán Nī; born 2 March 1987) is a retired Chinese volleyball player who won the gold medal in the 2016 Summer Olympics. On the club level, she played for Liaoning. She announced her retirement from volleyball in November 2021.

== Career ==
Yan won the gold medal in the 2015 World Cup, 2016 Summer Olympics, and 2019 World Cup as a member of the China women's national volleyball team. She was awarded the Best Middle Blocker at 2018 FIVB World Championship and 2019 World Cup. In 2014 AVC cup, Yan won both the MVP and Best Middle Blocker awards.

== Clubs ==
- (China) Liaoning (2005–2021)

== Awards ==
=== Individuals ===
- 2006 Asian Junior Championship "Most Valuable Player"
- 2006 Asian Junior Championship "Best Blocker"
- 2011–2012 Chinese Volleyball League "Best Blocker"
- 2013–2014 Chinese Volleyball League "Best Blocker"
- 2014 Asian Cup "Most Valuable Player"
- 2014 Asian Cup "Best Middle Blocker"
- 2015 Asian Championship "Best Middle Blockers"
- 2018 World Championship "Best Middle Blockers"
- 2019 FIVB World Cup "Best Middle Blockers"

=== Clubs ===
- 2005–2006 Chinese Volleyball League - Champion, with Liaoning
- 2006–2007 Chinese Volleyball League - Runner-Up, with Liaoning
- 2007–2008 Chinese Volleyball League - Runner-Up, with Liaoning

=== National team ===
- 2014 Asian Cup Championship - Gold Medal
- 2014 Asian Games - Silver Medal
- 2015 Asian Championship - Gold Medal
- 2015 World Cup - Gold Medal
- 2016 Summer Olympics - Gold Medal
- 2017 World Grand Champions Cup - Gold Medal
- 2018 Volleyball Nations League - Bronze Medal
- 2018 Asian Games - Gold Medal
- 2018 World Championship - Bronze Medal
- 2019 World Cup - Gold Medal

Awards
Preceded by (China) Yang Junjing and (Brazil) Thaísa Menezes	Best Middle Blocker of World Championship; 2018 (with (Serbia) Milena Rašić)	Succeeded by (Italy) Anna Danesi and (Brazil) Ana Carolina da Silva
Preceded by (Cuba) Daymara Lescay (United States) TeTori Dixon	Best Middle Blocker of World Cup; 2019 (with (Russia) Irina Koroleva)	Succeeded by Incumbent
