= Lee Yeon-sun =

South Korean volleyball player (born 1973)

Personal information
- Nationality: South Korean
- Born: 12 December 1973 (age 51)

Sport
- Sport: Volleyball

Lee Yeon-sun (born 12 December 1973) is a South Korean volleyball player. She competed in the women's tournament at the 2000 Summer Olympics.
