= Kim Se-young =

South Korean volleyball player (born 1981)

Personal information
- Nationality: South Korean
- Born: 4 June 1981 (age 45); Busan, South Korea
- Height: 190 cm (6 ft 3 in)
- Weight: 72 kg (159 lb)
- Spike: 309 cm (122 in)
- Block: 300 cm (118 in)

Volleyball information
- Number: 15

Career
Years	Teams
2000−2012; 2014 −2018; 2018−2020	(South Korea) Daejeon KGC (South Korea) Suwon Hyundai (South Korea) Incheon Heungkuk Life

National team
2001−2011	South Korea

- Kim Se-young
- Hangul: 김세영
- Hanja: 金洗瑩
- RR: Gim Seyeong
- MR: Kim Seyŏng

Former name
- Hangul: 김향숙
- RR: Gim Hyangsuk
- MR: Kim Hyangsuk

Kim Se-young (Korean: 김세영; Hanja: 金洗瑩; born 4 June 1981 in Busan, Korea) is a South Korean professional volleyball player. She was part of the silver medal winning team at the 2010 Asian Games. She was part of the South Korea women's national volleyball team at the 2010 FIVB Volleyball Women's World Championship in Japan.

== Biography ==
She is part of the Korea Ginseng Corporation. In 2011, Kim participated in the FIVB Volleyball Women's World Cup held in Japan.
