= Chung Sun-hye =

South Korean volleyball player (born 1975)

Personal information
- Nationality: South Korean
- Born: 17 December 1975 (age 50)
- Height: 1.74 m (5 ft 9 in)
- Weight: 76 kg (168 lb)

National team
| 2000 | South Korea |

Chung Sun-hye or Jeong Seon-hye (Korean: 정선혜; born 17 December 1975) was a South Korean female volleyball player. She was part of the South Korea women's national volleyball team.

She participated in the 1998 FIVB Volleyball Women's World Championship. She competed with the national team at the 2000 Summer Olympics in Sydney, Australia, finishing 8th.

== See also ==
- South Korea at the 2000 Summer Olympics
