= Park Geum-suk =

South Korean volleyball player (born 1946)

Personal information
- Nationality: South Korean
- Born: 20 April 1946 (age 79); Seoul, South Korea

Sport
- Sport: Volleyball

Park Geum-suk (born 20 April 1946) is a South Korean volleyball player. She competed in the women's tournament at the 1968 Summer Olympics.
