= Kim Young-ja =

South Korean volleyball player (born 1949)

Kim Young-Ja

Personal information
- Nationality: South Korean
- Born: November 4, 1949 (age 76); South Korea

Kim Young-Ja (born 4 November 1949) is a South Korean former volleyball player who competed in the 1968 Summer Olympics and in the 1972 Summer Olympics.
