= Kim Hee-jin =

South Korean volleyball player (born 1991)

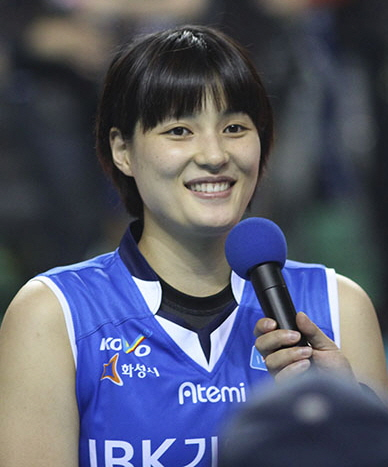
- Kim Hee Jin in 2012

Personal information
- Nickname: Heegle / Giant Haribo / Nation’s Teddy Bear
- Nationality: South Korean
- Born: 29 April 1991 (age 35) Busan, South Korea
- Height: 185 cm (6 ft 1 in)
- Weight: 75 kg (165 lb)
- Spike: 320 cm (126 in)
- Block: 315 cm (124 in)

Volleyball information
- Position: Opposite Spiker / Middle Blocker
- Number: 4

Career
- Years: Team
- 2010–2025 2025-: (South Korea) IBK Altos (South Korea) Suwon Hyundai Engineering & Construction Hillstate

National team
- Years: Team
- 2009–2022: South Korea
Honours
Women's volleyball
Asian Games
Gold medal – first place	2014 Incheon	Team
Asian Championship
Bronze medal – third place	2013 Nakhon Ratchasima
Bronze medal – third place	2017 Metro Manila
Bronze medal – third place	2019 Seoul
Asian Cup
Silver medal – second place	2014 Shenzhen

- Kim Hee-jin
- Hangul: 김희진
- Hanja: 金姬眞
- RR: Gim Huijin
- MR: Kim Hŭijin

Kim Hee-jin (Korean: 김희진; born 29 April 1991) is a South Korean volleyball player. She is a member of the South Korea women's national volleyball team at the 2012 Summer Olympics, 2016 Summer Olympics and 2020 Summer Olympics. The team finished at fourth place in 2012, 2020 and fifth in 2016.

Kim has been a member of the Hwaseong IBK Altos since the team's inaugural season, 2010–2011. She was selected with the first overall pick in the NH-Nonghyup V-League 2010-2011 draft by the Altos. She helped her team to the league title and championship title during the 2012–2013 season. In the 2013–2014 season, Kim and her team clinched their second consecutive league title, but lost to the GS Caltex Seoul KIXX in the championship round. In the 2014–2015 season, her team finished second in the league standings but swept the Seongnam Korea Expressway Corporation Hi-pass in the championship round to claim the Altos' second championship title in three years. Kim Hee-jin played a crucial role during the championship round alongside American Destinee Hooker.

On April 13, 2015, Kim Hee-jin was selected to the South Korea women's national volleyball team together with fellow Altos members Park Jeong-ah, Chae Seona, Nam Jiyeon, and Kim Yoori.

== Filmography ==
=== TV Show ===
- Omniscient Interfering View - (guest, Ep. 169, 170)
- Breakfast with Tiffany – (guest, Ep. 6, 7)
- Running Man – (guest, Ep. 572, 573, 574)
- I live alone - (appearance, Ep 412, 413)
- Master In The House - (appearance, Ep. 123)
- Brave Single Parenting- Raise on my own - (guest, Ep. 12)
