= Park Eun-jin =

South Korean volleyball player

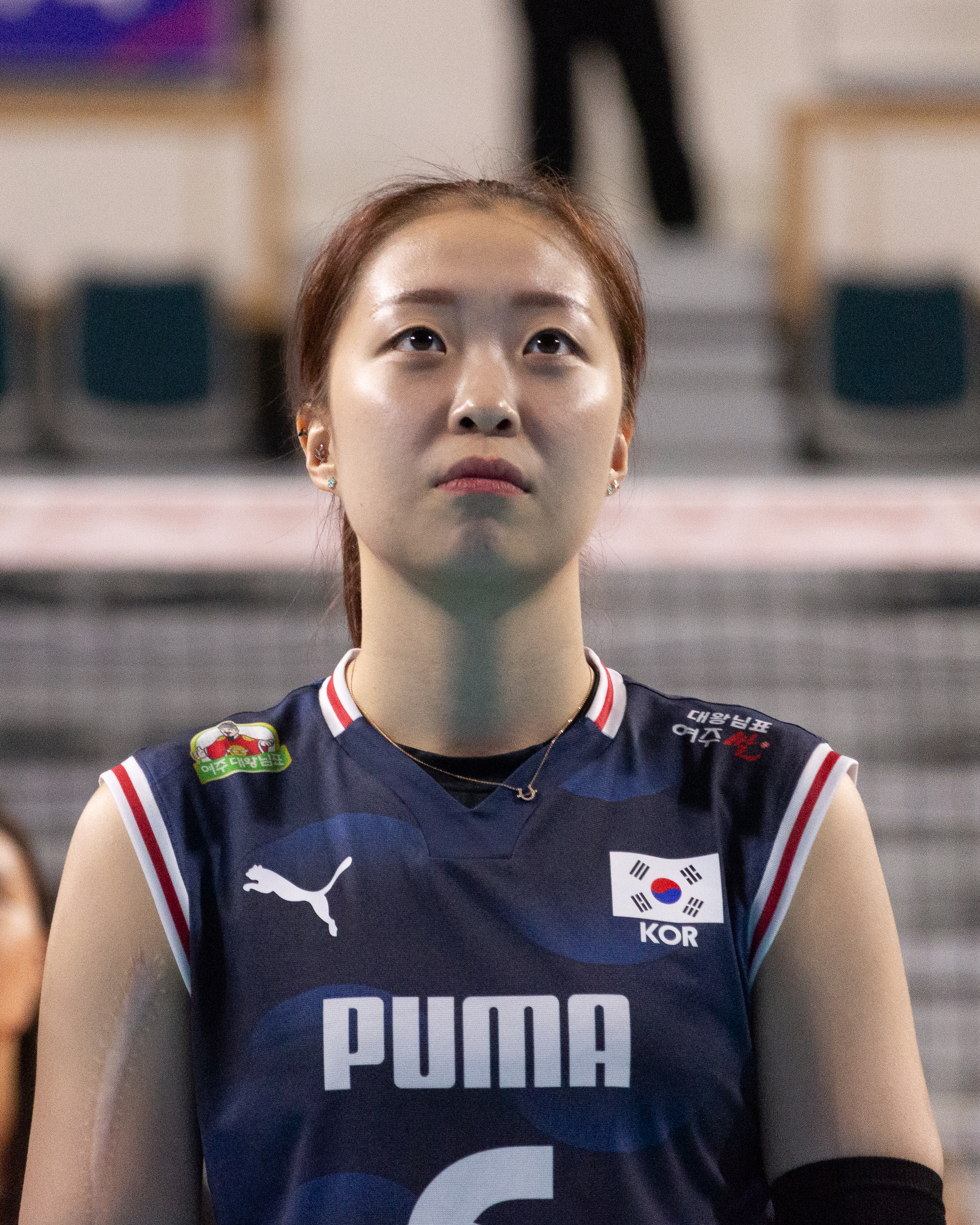
- Park Eun-jin in 2025

Personal information
- Full name: Park Eun-Jin 박은진 朴恩真
- Nationality: South Korea
- Born: 15 December 1999 (age 26) Kyongsangnam-do, South Korea
- Height: 1.87 m (6 ft 2 in)
- Weight: 73 kg (161 lb)

Sport
- Sport: Volleyball
- College team: gyeonghae girls' middle school (2014/15-2015/16), Sunmyung girls' high school (2016/17-2018/19)
- Club: Daejeon Korea Ginseng Corporation (2018/19-still)

Park Eun-jin (born 15 December 1999) is a South Korean volleyball player. She competed in the 2020 Summer Olympics. She competed in the Volleyball Nations League (2018-still). She competed in the 2018 FIVB Volleyball Women's World Championship,Volleyball at the 2020 Summer Olympics – Women's qualification and 2019 FIVB Volleyball Women's World Cup
