= Lee In-sook =

South Korean volleyball player (born 1950)

Lee In-Sook

Personal information
- Born: April 8, 1950 (age 76); South Korea

Lee In-Sook (born 8 April 1950) is a South Korean former volleyball player who competed in the women's tournament at the 1972 Summer Olympics. The team finished in 4th place.
