= Lee Hyang-sim =

South Korean volleyball player (born 1947)

Personal information
- Nationality: South Korean
- Born: 14 August 1947 (age 77); Changhung, South Korea

Sport
- Sport: Volleyball

Lee Hyang-sim (born 14 August 1947) is a South Korean volleyball player. She competed in the women's tournament at the 1968 Summer Olympics.
