= Kim Oe-sun =

South Korean volleyball player (born 1950)

Personal information
- Nationality: South Korean
- Born: 14 May 1950 (age 74); Geoje, South Korea

Sport
- Sport: Volleyball

Kim Oe-sun (Korean: 김외순, born 14 May 1950) is a South Korean volleyball player. She competed in the women's tournament at the 1968 Summer Olympics.
