= Lee Meong-hee =

South Korean volleyball player (born 1978)

Lee Meong-Hee

Personal information
- Nationality: South Korean
- Born: 4 July 1978 (age 48)
- Height: 1.75 m (5 ft 9 in)
- Weight: 64 kg (141 lb)

National team
| 2000 | South Korea |

Lee Meong-Hee (Korean: 이명희; born 4 July 1978) is a South Korean female volleyball player. She was part of the South Korea women's national volleyball team which competed at the 2000 Summer Olympics in Sydney, Australia, finishing 8th.

She participated in the 1998 FIVB Volleyball Women's World Championship, and 2003 FIVB Women's World Cup.

== See also ==
- South Korea at the 2000 Summer Olympics
