= Kim Mi-jin =

South Korean volleyball player (born 1979)

Personal information
- Nationality: South Korean
- Born: 22 July 1979 (age 47)
- Height: 1.82 m (6 ft 0 in)
- Weight: 65 kg (143 lb)
- Spike: 300 cm (120 in)
- Block: 290 cm (110 in)

Volleyball information
- Number: 11

Career
Years	Teams
2004	(South Korea) Korea Expressway Corporation

National team
2004	South Korea South Korea

Kim Mi-jin (born 22 July 1979) is a former South Korean female volleyball player. She was part of the South Korea women's national volleyball team, competing at the 2004 Summer Olympics in Athens, Greece. She played with Korea Expressway Corporation in 2004.

== Clubs ==
- (South Korea) Korea Expressway Corporation (2004)

== See also ==
- South Korea at the 2004 Summer Olympics
