= Lee Hyo-hee =

South Korean volleyball player (born 1980)

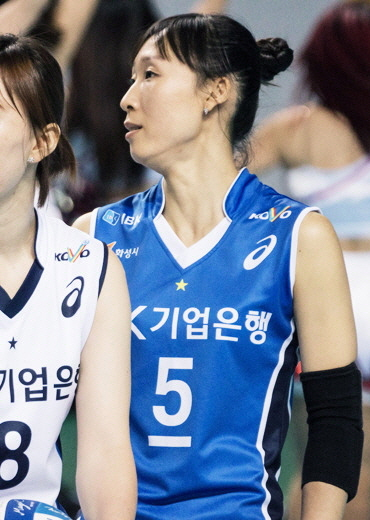

Personal information
- Nationality: South Korean
- Born: 26 August 1980 (age 46); Suwon, Gyeonggi-do, South Korea
- Height: 173 cm (68 in)
- Weight: 60 kg (132 lb)
- Spike: 280 cm (110 in)
- Block: 271 cm (107 in)
- Education: Daeduk College

Volleyball information
- Position: Setter

National team
2005, 2011, 2014–2016, 2018–2019	South Korea
Honours
Women's volleyball
Representing South Korea
Asian Games
Gold medal – first place	2014 Incheon
Bronze medal – third place	2018 Jacarta–Palembang
Asian Championship
Bronze medal – third place	2011 Taipei

Korean name
- Hangul: 이효희
- RR: I Hyohui
- MR: I Hyohŭi

Lee Hyo-hee (Korean: 이효희; born 26 August 1980) is a South Korean volleyball player. She was part of the South Korea national team and participated in the 2014 FIVB World Grand Prix. She has passed through four clubs in her 20 years professional volleyball career in Korea and achieved Korean V-League championship in each club (2005–06, 2008–09, 2013–14, 2017–18). On club level, she played for Korea Expressway Corporation since 2014. She was the oldest active player in Women Korean V-League in season 2018–19.

At the end of the 2019–20 season, Hyo-hee revealed that she has ended her professional career. She wants to be a coach.

== Club career ==
- Played with Daejeon KGC (1998–2007)
- Played with Incheon Heungkuk Life Pink Spiders (2007–2010)
- Played with Hwaseong IBK Altos (2011–2014)
- Played with Korea Expressway Corporation (2014–2020)

== Awards ==
- 2007–2008 Korean V-League - Setter Award
- 2008–2009 Korean V-League - Setter Award
- 2013–2014 Korean V-League - Season MVP
- 2014–2015 Korean V-League - Season MVP & Best 7
