= 2015 Asian Women's Volleyball Championship =

International indoor volleyball tournament

Tournament details
- Host country: China
- City: Tianjin
- Dates: 20 – 28 May
- Teams: 14 (from 1 confederation)
- Venues: 2 (in 1 host city)

Final positions
- Champions: China (13th title)
- Runners-up: South Korea
- Third place: Thailand
- Fourth place: Chinese Taipei

Tournament awards
- MVP: (China) Zhu Ting

The 2015 Asian Women's Volleyball Championship was the eighteenth edition of the Asian Championship, a biennial international volleyball tournament organised by the Asian Volleyball Confederation (AVC) with Chinese Volleyball Association (CVA). The tournament was held in Tianjin, China from 20 to 28 May 2015.

== Qualification ==
If there were fewer than 16 teams applied for participation, all teams compete in the tournament.
If there were more than 16 teams applied for participation, participated teams would be determined by:
– The host nation
– Top 10 ranked teams from the previous edition
– Representatives from each of the five Asian Volleyball Confederation Zonal Associations

=== Qualified teams ===
Central Asia	Eastern Asia	Oceania	Southeastern Asia	Western Asia
India; Iran; Kazakhstan; Sri Lanka; Turkmenistan	China; Chinese Taipei; Hong Kong; Japan; Mongolia; South Korea	Australia; Fiji	Vietnam; Philippines; Thailand	

== Pools composition ==
The teams were seeded based on their final ranking at the 2013 Asian Women's Volleyball Championship. The host country and the top 7 ranked teams were seed in the Serpentine system. The 8 remaining teams were drawn on 11 February 2015 in Bangkok, Thailand. Ranking from the previous edition was shown in brackets except the host (who ranked 4th) and the teams who did not participate, which were denoted by (-). Japan played in the Asian Championship with their U-23 national team.

Pool A	Pool B	Pool C	Pool D
China (Host)	Thailand (1)	Japan (2)	South Korea (3)
Iran (8)	Chinese Taipei (7)	Vietnam (6)	Kazakhstan (5)
~~Fiji (–)~~ *	Hong Kong (13)	Mongolia (14)	Australia (9)
India (11)	Sri Lanka (15)	~~Turkmenistan (–)~~ *	Philippines (12)

* Withdrew

== Venues ==
Tianjin, China
Tianjin Olympic Center Stadium	Tianjin Polytechnic University Gymnasium
Capacity: 7,000	Capacity: "N/A"
	N/A

== Pool standing procedure ==
1. Numbers of matches won
2. Match points
3. Sets ratio
4. Points ratio
5. Result of the last match between the tied teams

Match won 3–0 or 3–1: 3 match points for the winner, 0 match points for the loser
Match won 3–2: 2 match points for the winner, 1 match point for the loser §

== Preliminary round ==
- All times are China standard time (UTC+08:00).

=== Pool A ===
Pos	Team	Pld	W	L	Pts	SW	SL	SR	SPW	SPL	SPR	Qualification
1	China	2	2	0	6	6	0	MAX	150	68	2.206	Pool E
2	Iran	2	1	1	3	3	4	0.750	131	158	0.829	Pool E
3	India	2	0	2	0	1	6	0.167	115	170	0.676	Pool G

Date	Time		Score		Set 1	Set 2	Set 3	Set 4	Set 5	Total	Report
20 May	19:30	India	1–3	Iran	25–20	17–25	20–25	21–25		83–95	Report
21 May	19:30	China	3–0	India	25–8	25–12	25–12			75–32	Report
22 May	19:30	China	3–0	Iran	25–15	25–9	25–12			75–36	Report

=== Pool B ===
Pos	Team	Pld	W	L	Pts	SW	SL	SR	SPW	SPL	SPR	Qualification
1	Thailand	3	3	0	9	9	0	MAX	225	108	2.083	Pool F
2	Chinese Taipei	3	2	1	6	6	3	2.000	205	147	1.395	Pool F
3	Hong Kong	3	1	2	3	3	6	0.500	127	216	0.588	Pool H
4	Sri Lanka	3	0	3	0	0	9	0.000	139	225	0.618	Pool H

Date	Time		Score		Set 1	Set 2	Set 3	Set 4	Set 5	Total	Report
20 May	12:00	Sri Lanka	0–3	Hong Kong	21–25	23–25	22–25			66–75	Report
20 May	14:00	Chinese Taipei	0–3	Thailand	18–25	18–25	19–25			55–75	Report
21 May	12:00	Thailand	3–0	Hong Kong	25–7	25–6	25–10			75–23	Report
21 May	12:00	Chinese Taipei	3–0	Sri Lanka	25–10	25–23	25–10			75–43	Report
22 May	12:00	Hong Kong	0–3	Chinese Taipei	8–25	16–25	5–25			29–75	Report
22 May	16:00	Sri Lanka	0–3	Thailand	17–25	9–25	4–25			30–75	Report

=== Pool C ===
Pos	Team	Pld	W	L	Pts	SW	SL	SR	SPW	SPL	SPR	Qualification
1	Vietnam	2	2	0	5	6	2	3.000	181	155	1.168	Pool E
2	Japan	2	1	1	4	5	3	1.667	185	152	1.217	Pool E
3	Mongolia	2	0	2	0	0	6	0.000	91	150	0.607	Pool G

Date	Time		Score		Set 1	Set 2	Set 3	Set 4	Set 5	Total	Report
20 May	12:00	Vietnam	3–2	Japan	16–25	22–25	25–22	25–22	18–16	106–110	Report
21 May	14:00	Vietnam	3–0	Mongolia	25–18	25–14	25–13			75–45	Report
22 May	12:00	Mongolia	0–3	Japan	20–25	15–25	11–25			46–75	Report

=== Pool D ===
Pos	Team	Pld	W	L	Pts	SW	SL	SR	SPW	SPL	SPR	Qualification
1	South Korea	3	3	0	9	9	1	9.000	249	145	1.717	Pool F
2	Kazakhstan	3	2	1	6	6	3	2.000	210	157	1.338	Pool F
3	Australia	3	1	2	3	4	7	0.571	209	251	0.833	Pool H
4	Philippines	3	0	3	0	1	9	0.111	134	249	0.538	Pool H

Date	Time		Score		Set 1	Set 2	Set 3	Set 4	Set 5	Total	Report
20 May	16:00	Philippines	1–3	Australia	18–25	18–25	26–24	15–25		77–99	Report
20 May	19:30	Kazakhstan	0–3	South Korea	22–25	16–25	22–25			60–75	Report
21 May	16:00	Australia	1–3	South Korea	11–25	26–24	11–25	14–25		62–99	Report
21 May	16:00	Kazakhstan	3–0	Philippines	25–11	25–10	25–13			75–34	Report
22 May	16:00	South Korea	3–0	Philippines	25–8	25–7	25–8			75–23	Report
22 May	19:30	Kazakhstan	3–0	Australia	25–17	25–14	25–17			75–48	Report

== Second round ==
- All times are China standard time (UTC+08:00).
- The results and the points of the matches between the same teams that were already played during the preliminary round shall be taken into account for the classification round.

=== Pool E ===
Pos	Team	Pld	W	L	Pts	SW	SL	SR	SPW	SPL	SPR	Qualification
1	China	3	3	0	9	9	0	MAX	225	112	2.009	Final round
2	Vietnam	3	2	1	4	6	7	0.857	251	289	0.869	Final round
3	Japan	3	1	2	4	5	6	0.833	228	235	0.970	Final round
4	Iran	3	0	3	1	2	9	0.222	194	262	0.740	Final round

Date	Time		Score		Set 1	Set 2	Set 3	Set 4	Set 5	Total	Report
23 May	12:00	Iran	2–3	Vietnam	25–21	17–25	28–26	22–25	12–15	104–112	Report
23 May	19:30	China	3–0	Japan	25–19	25–14	25–10			75–43	Report
24 May	16:00	Iran	0–3	Japan	19–25	19–25	16–25			54–75	Report
24 May	19:30	China	3–0	Vietnam	25–11	25–11	25–11			75–33	Report

=== Pool F ===
Pos	Team	Pld	W	L	Pts	SW	SL	SR	SPW	SPL	SPR	Qualification
1	South Korea	3	3	0	8	9	2	4.500	254	208	1.221	Final round
2	Thailand	3	2	1	7	8	3	2.667	247	191	1.293	Final round
3	Chinese Taipei	3	1	2	2	3	8	0.375	201	246	0.817	Final round
4	Kazakhstan	3	0	3	1	2	9	0.222	188	196	0.959	Final round

Date	Time		Score		Set 1	Set 2	Set 3	Set 4	Set 5	Total	Report
23 May	14:00	Thailand	3–0	Kazakhstan	25–11	25–9	25–12			75–32	Report
23 May	16:00	Chinese Taipei	0–3	South Korea	12–25	20–25	19–25			51–75	Report
24 May	12:00	Chinese Taipei	3–2	Kazakhstan	25–10	25–22	15–25	23–25	16–14	104–96	Report
24 May	14:00	Thailand	2–3	South Korea	25–21	17–25	25–18	19–25	11–15	97–104	Report

=== Pool G ===
Pos	Team	Pld	W	L	Pts	SW	SL	SR	SPW	SPL	SPR	Qualification
1	India	1	1	0	3	3	0	MAX	75	49	1.531	Classification 9th–12th
2	Mongolia	1	0	1	0	0	3	0.000	49	75	0.653	Classification 9th–12th

Date	Time		Score		Set 1	Set 2	Set 3	Set 4	Set 5	Total	Report
24 May	12:00	India	3–0	Mongolia	25–18	25–15	25–16			75–49	Report

=== Pool H ===
Pos	Team	Pld	W	L	Pts	SW	SL	SR	SPW	SPL	SPR	Qualification
1	Australia	3	3	0	8	9	4	2.250	298	272	1.096	Classification 9th–12th
2	Philippines	3	2	1	5	7	6	1.167	275	270	1.019	Classification 9th–12th
3	Hong Kong	3	1	2	4	6	6	1.000	256	262	0.977	
4	Sri Lanka	3	0	3	1	3	9	0.333	251	276	0.909	

Date	Time		Score		Set 1	Set 2	Set 3	Set 4	Set 5	Total	Report
23 May	14:00	Hong Kong	2–3	Philippines	25–21	25–18	20–25	16–25	11–15	97–104	Report
23 May	16:00	Sri Lanka	2–3	Australia	22–25	19–25	25–19	25–16	20–22	111–107	Report
24 May	14:00	Hong Kong	1–3	Australia	17–25	25–27	25–15	17–25		84–92	Report
24 May	16:00	Sri Lanka	1–3	Philippines	14–25	25–19	18–25	17–25		74–94	Report

== Classification round ==
- All times are China standard time (UTC+08:00).

=== Classification 9th–12th ===
9th–12th places
26 May - Tianjin
India	3
Philippines	0
26 May - Tianjin
Australia	3
Mongolia	1

9th place
27 May - Tianjin
India	2
Australia	3
11th place
27 May - Tianjin
Philippines	1
Mongolia	3

==== Semifinals ====
Date	Time		Score		Set 1	Set 2	Set 3	Set 4	Set 5	Total	Report
26 May	12:00	India	3–0	Philippines	27–25	25–13	25–20			77–58	Report
26 May	14:00	Australia	3–1	Mongolia	25–20	24–26	25–15	25–19		99–80	Report

==== 11th place ====
Date	Time		Score		Set 1	Set 2	Set 3	Set 4	Set 5	Total	Report
27 May	12:00	Philippines	1–3	Mongolia	18–25	13–25	30–28	22–25		83–103	Report

==== 9th place ====
Date	Time		Score		Set 1	Set 2	Set 3	Set 4	Set 5	Total	Report
27 May	14:00	India	2–3	Australia	18–25	25–16	25–22	17–25	13–15	98–103	Report

== Final round ==
- All times are China standard time (UTC+08:00).

=== Final eight ===
Quarterfinals
26 May - Tianjin
China	3
Kazakhstan	0
26 May - Tianjin
Thailand	3
Japan	0
26 May - Tianjin
South Korea	3
Iran	1
26 May - Tianjin
Vietnam	0
Chinese Taipei	3

Semifinals
27 May - Tianjin
China	3
Thailand	1
27 May - Tianjin
South Korea	3
Chinese Taipei	1

Final
28 May - Tianjin
China	3
South Korea	0
3rd place
28 May - Tianjin
Thailand	3
Chinese Taipei	0

5th–8th places
27 May - Tianjin
Kazakhstan	0
Japan	3
27 May - Tianjin
Iran	1
Vietnam	3

5th place
28 May - Tianjin
Japan	1
Vietnam	3
7th place
28 May - Tianjin
Kazakhstan	3
Iran	0

=== Quarterfinals ===
Date	Time		Score		Set 1	Set 2	Set 3	Set 4	Set 5	Total	Report
26 May	12:00	Vietnam	0–3	Chinese Taipei	18–25	20–25	19–25			57–75	Report
26 May	14:00	Thailand	3–0	Japan	25–16	25–15	25–14			75–45	Report
26 May	16:00	China	3–0	Kazakhstan	25–13	25–11	25–11			75–35	Report
26 May	19:30	South Korea	3–1	Iran	25–17	22–25	25–17	25–14		97–73	Report

=== 5th–8th semifinals ===
Date	Time		Score		Set 1	Set 2	Set 3	Set 4	Set 5	Total	Report
27 May	12:00	Iran	1–3	Vietnam	25–18	18–25	22–25	18–25		83–93	Report
27 May	14:00	Kazakhstan	0–3	Japan	20–25	18–25	16–25			54–75	Report

=== Semifinals ===
Date	Time		Score		Set 1	Set 2	Set 3	Set 4	Set 5	Total	Report
27 May	16:00	China	3–1	Thailand	22–25	25–22	25–10	25–23		97–80	Report
27 May	19:30	South Korea	3–1	Chinese Taipei	25–16	25–13	23–25	25–15		98–69	Report

=== 7th place ===
Date	Time		Score		Set 1	Set 2	Set 3	Set 4	Set 5	Total	Report
28 May	12:00	Kazakhstan	3–0	Iran	25–21	25–18	25–19			75–58	Report

=== 5th place ===
Date	Time		Score		Set 1	Set 2	Set 3	Set 4	Set 5	Total	Report
28 May	14:00	Japan	1–3	Vietnam	23–25	17–25	25–21	19–25		84–96	Report

=== 3rd place ===
Date	Time		Score		Set 1	Set 2	Set 3	Set 4	Set 5	Total	Report
28 May	16:00	Thailand	3–0	Chinese Taipei	25–14	25–14	25–10			75–38	Report

=== Final ===
Date	Time		Score		Set 1	Set 2	Set 3	Set 4	Set 5	Total	Report
28 May	19:30	China	3–0	South Korea	25–21	25–21	25–21			75–63	Report

== Final standing ==
Rank	Team
1st place, gold medalist(s)	China
2nd place, silver medalist(s)	South Korea
3rd place, bronze medalist(s)	Thailand
4	Chinese Taipei
5	Vietnam
6	Japan
7	Kazakhstan
8	Iran
9	Australia
10	India
11	Mongolia
12	Philippines
13	Hong Kong
14	Sri Lanka

2015 Asian Women's champions

China
13th title

Team roster
Yuan Xinyue, Zhu Ting, Yang Fangxu, Shen Jingsi, Yang Junjing, Zhang Changning, Zeng Chunlei, Hui Ruoqi, Shan Danna, Lin Li, Ding Xia, Yan Ni
Head Coach: Lang Ping

== Awards ==
- Most valuable player
  (China) Zhu Ting
- Best setter
  (China) Shen Jingsi
- Best outside spikers
  (China) Zhu Ting
  (South Korea) Kim Yeon-koung
- Best middle blocker
  (Thailand) Pleumjit Thinkaow
- Best opposite spiker
  (China) Zeng Chunlei
- Best libero
  (South Korea) Nam Jie-youn

== See also ==
- 2015 Asian Men's Volleyball Championship
