= Bae Yoo-na =

South Korean volleyball player (born 1989)

Personal information
- Nationality: South Korean
- Born: 30 November 1989 (age 36); Bucheon, Gyeonggi-do, South Korea
- Hometown: Ansan, Gyeonggi-do, South Korea
- Height: 180 cm (5 ft 11 in)
- Weight: 67 kg (148 lb)
- Spike: 303 cm (119 in)
- Block: 294 cm (116 in)

Volleyball information
- Position: Middle Blocker / Opposite spiker
- Current club: Gimcheon Korea Expressway Hi-pass
- Number: 10 (club) 18 (national team)

National team
2006	South Korea

- Bae Yoo-na
- Hangul: 배유나
- RR: Bae Yuna
- MR: Pae Yuna

Bae Yoo-na (Korean: 배유나; born 30 November 1989) is a South Korean volleyball player. She was part of the South Korea women's national volleyball team at the 2006 FIVB Volleyball Women's World Championship in Japan, and 2007 FIVB Volleyball Women's World Cup. She played with GS Caltex.

== Club career ==
- Played with GS Caltex Seoul KIXX (2007-2016)
- Played with Gimcheon Korea Expressway Hi-pass (2017- )

== International career ==
- 2014 Asian Games
  - Team: (gold)
