= Park Mee-kyung =

South Korean volleyball player (born 1975)

Personal information
- Nationality: South Korean
- Born: 13 May 1975 (age 51)
- Height: 1.81 m (5 ft 11 in)
- Weight: 68 kg (150 lb)
- Spike: 315 cm (124 in)
- Block: 303 cm (119 in)

Volleyball information
- Number: 2 (national team)

Career
Years	Teams
1994–1997; 1998	Hanll Synthetic Fiber; Korea Highway Corporation

National team
1994–2000	South Korea

- Park Mee-kyung
- Hangul: 박미경
- Hanja: 朴美敬
- RR: Bak Migyeong
- MR: Pak Migyŏng

Park Mee-kyung or Park Mi-kyung (Korean: 박미경; born 13 May 1975? / 6 April 1975?) is a retired South Korean female volleyball player. She was part of the South Korea women's national volleyball team.

She competed with the national team at the 2000 Summer Olympics in Sydney, Australia, finishing 8th. On the club level she played with Hanil Synthetic Fiber, then in 1998 transferred to Korea Highway Corporation.

== Clubs ==
- Hanil Synthetic Fiber (1994–1997)
- Korea Highway Corporation (1998)

== See also ==
- South Korea at the 2000 Summer Olympics
