= Choi Kwang-hee (volleyball) =

South Korean volleyball player and coach

Personal information
- Nationality: South Korean
- Born: 25 May 1974 (age 52); Gyeonggi-do, South Korea
- Height: 1.74 m (5 ft 9 in)
- Weight: 73 kg (161 lb)
- Spike: 304 cm (120 in)
- Block: 289 cm (114 in)

Volleyball information
- Position: wing spiker
- Current club: Korea Tobacco & Ginseng
- Number: 6 (national team)

National team
1996–2004	South Korea

- Choi Kwang-hee
- Hangul: 최광희
- Hanja: 崔光姬
- RR: Choe Gwanghui
- MR: Ch'oe Kwanghŭi

Choi Kwang-hee (Korean: 최광희; born 25 May 1974) is a South Korean volleyball coach, and was a player, as a wing spiker.

She was part of the South Korea women's national volleyball team at the 1996 Summer Olympics, 2000 Summer Olympics and 2004 Summer Olympics. She also competed at the 2002 FIVB Volleyball Women's World Championship in Germany. On club level she played with Korea Tobacco & Ginseng.

== Clubs ==
- (South Korea) Hanll Synthetic Fiber (1993–1998)
- (South Korea) Korea Tobacco & Ginseng (1998–2007)
