= Kim Hae-ran =

South Korean volleyball player (born 1984)

Personal information
- Nationality: South Korean
- Born: 16 March 1984 (age 42) Ulsan, South Korea
- Height: 168 cm (5 ft 6 in)
- Weight: 60 kg (132 lb)
- Spike: 280 cm (110 in)
- Block: 270 cm (106 in)

Volleyball information
- Position: Libero

Career
- Years: Team
- 2003−2015 2015−2017 2017−Present: Korea Expressway Corporation; Daejeon KGC; Incheon Heungkuk Life Pink Spiders

National team
- Years: Team
- 2006−2020: South Korea
Honours
Women's volleyball
Representing South Korea
Asian Games
| Gold medal – first place | 2014 Incheon |
| Silver medal – second place | 2010 Guangzhou |
Asian Championship
| Bronze medal – third place | 2013 Nakhon Ratchasima |
| Bronze medal – third place | 2019 Seoul |
Asian Cup
| Silver medal – second place | 2014 Shenzhen |

Kim Hae-ran (Korean: 김해란; Hanja: 金海蘭; born 16 March 1984) is a South Korean professional volleyball player. She was part of the team at the 2012 Summer Olympics and 2016 Summer Olympics. She also competed at the 2006 World Championship and 2018 Nations League.

Hae-ran played a key role in the team, as one of the best diggers, being the best libero in the 2019 FIVB World Cup with a 3.95 average per set.

In 2020, at the end of the 2019−20 season, she announced her retirement from the courts. She wanted to give a chance to younger players, and also start a family.

== Clubs ==
- Korea Expressway Corporation (2002–2015)
- Daejeon KGC (2015–2017)
- Incheon Heungkuk Life Pink Spiders (2017–2020, 2021–)
