= Qiao Ting =

Chinese volleyball player (born 1992)

Personal information
- Nationality: Chinese
- Born: 2 March 1992 (age 34)
- Height: 189 cm (74 in)
- Weight: 66 kg (146 lb)
- Spike: 315 cm (124 in)
- Block: 315 cm (124 in)

Career
Years	Teams
2009 - present	Beijing

National team
2013 - 2014	China

Qiao Ting (born 2 March 1992) is a Chinese female volleyball player. She is part of the China women's national volleyball team.

She participated in the 2014 FIVB Volleyball World Grand Prix. On club level she played for Beijing in 2014.
