= 2006 FIVB World Grand Prix squads =

This article show all participating team squads at the 2006 FIVB Women's Volleyball World Grand Prix, played by twelve countries from August 16 to September 10, 2006 with the final round held in Reggio Calabria, Italy.

== Azerbaijan ==
- Head Coach: Faig Garayg

#	Name	Date of birth	Height	Weight	Spike	Block
2	Kseniya Poznyak	21.11.1986	190	78	300	395
3	Alla Hasanova	06.08.1970	183	68	295	290
4	Oksana Guliyeva (c)	28.07.1984	184	77	300	290
5	Yelena Shabovta	28.08.1969	182	65	288	280
6	Irina Siminyagina	29.11.1984	182	71	295	280
7	Yelena Parkhomenko	11.09.1982	186	68	300	293
8	Natavan Gasimova	08.07.1985	176	64	287	275
9	Natalya Mammadova	02.12.1984	195	75	305	298
10	Oksana Mammadyarova	06.04.1978	177	66	305	290
11	Inessa Korkmaz	17.01.1972	190	78	299	293
12	Valeriya Korotenko	29.01.1984	171	62	260	255
14	Lada Maksimova	05.09.1987	183	70	290	285
16	Sabina Yarmammadova	06.04.1988	165	52	250	240
17	Inara Ibrahimova	05.07.1986	180	68	284	280
18	Kamala Asgarova	14.06.1988	178	63	280	275

== Brazil ==
- Head Coach: José Roberto Guimarães

#	Name	Date of birth	Height	Weight	Spike	Block
1	Walewska Oliveira	01.10.1979	190	73	310	290
2	Carolina Albuquerque	25.07.1977	182	76	289	279
3	Marianne Steinbrecher	23.08.1983	189	70	310	290
5	Caroline Gattaz	27.07.1981	192	87	304	280
6	Thaisa Menezes	15.05.1987	196	79	316	301
7	Hélia Souza (c)	10.03.1970	173	63	283	264
8	Valeska Menezes	23.04.1976	180	62	302	290
9	Fabiana Claudino	24.01.1985	193	76	314	293
10	Welissa Gonzaga	09.09.1982	179	76	300	287
11	Marcelle Moraes	17.10.1976	181	72	303	289
12	Jaqueline Carvalho	31.12.1983	186	70	302	286
13	Sheilla Castro	01.07.1983	186	64	302	284
14	Fabiana de Oliveira	07.03.1980	169	59	276	266
15	Arlene Xavier	20.12.1969	177	74	299	290
16	Natalia Pereira	24.04.1989	186	76	300	288
17	Renata Colombo	25.02.1981	181	78	305	293
18	Joyce Silva	13.06.1984	190	67	311	294
19	Fernanda Rodrigues	10.05.1986	181	77	309	289

== China ==
- Head Coach: Chen Zhonghe

#	Name	Date of birth	Height	Weight	Spike	Block
1	Wang Yimei	11.01.1988	190	90	318	205
2	Feng Kun (c)	28.12.1978	183	75	319	310
3	Yang Hao	21.03.1980	183	75	319	314
4	Liu Yanan	29.09.1980	186	73	320	313
5	Chu Jinling	29.07.1984	190	72	310	302
6	Li Shan	21.05.1980	185	72	317	300
7	Zhou Suhong	23.04.1979	182	75	313	305
8	Zhao Ruirui	08.10.1981	196	70	326	315
9	Zhang Yuehong	09.11.1975	182	73	324	322
10	Xue Ming	23.02.1987	193	68	322	310
11	Li Juan	15.05.1981	187	73	315	307
12	Song Nina	07.04.1980	179	65	303	293
13	Wei Qiuyue	26.09.1988	182	65	305	300
14	Wang Lin	02.11.1986	175	60	300	290
15	Ma Yunwen	19.10.1986	189	70	315	307
16	Zhang Na	19.04.1980	180	72	302	292
17	Xu Yunli	02.08.1987	196	75	313	306
18	Zhang Ping	23.03.1982	187	73	312	301

== Cuba ==
- Head Coach: Luis Felipe Calderón

#	Name	Date of birth	Height	Weight	Spike	Block
1	Yumilka Ruiz (c)	08.05.1978	179	62	329	315
2	Yanelis Santos	30.03.1986	183	71	315	312
3	Nancy Carrillo	11.01.1986	190	74	318	315
4	Yenisey González	23.08.1983	193	67	315	312
5	Maisbelis Martínez	13.06.1977	182	79	322	306
6	Daimí Ramírez	08.10.1983	176	67	305	290
7	Lisbet Arredondo	22.11.1987	181	62	315	312
8	Yaima Ortiz	09.11.1981	179	70	325	313
9	Rachel Sánchez	09.01.1989	188	75	325	320
10	Yusleinis Herrera	12.03.1984	180	67	312	310
11	Liana Mesa Luaces	26.12.1977	179	70	318	307
12	Rosir Calderón	28.12.1984	191	66	330	325
13	Anniara Muñoz	24.01.1980	180	69	320	312
14	Kenia Carcaces	22.01.1986	188	69	308	306
15	Yusidey Silié	11.11.1984	183	80	316	300
16	María Téllez	12.09.1983	186	69	320	316
17	Nataly Grinan	07.05.1984	181	77	316	312
18	Zoila Barros	06.08.1976	188	76	325	312

== Dominican Republic ==
- Head Coach: Beato Miguel Cruz

#	Name	Date of birth	Height	Weight	Spike	Block
1	Annerys Vargas	07.08.1982	191	70	303	298
2	Ana Esther Lara	08.07.1988	168	58	279	274
3	Yudelkys Bautista	05.12.1974	193	68	312	308
4	Ana Ligia Fabian	07.11.1988	179	51	310	305
5	Evelyn Carrera	05.10.1971	182	70	301	297
6	Carmen Rosa Caso	29.11.1981	168	59	243	241
7	Sofía Mercedes	25.05.1976	185	70	306	298
8	Laritza Reyes	30.09.1982	182	61	305	300
9	Nuris Arias	20.05.1973	190	78	315	306
10	Milagros Cabral	17.10.1978	181	63	308	305
11	Juana Miguelina González	03.01.1979	185	70	295	290
12	Karla Echenique	16.05.1986	181	62	279	273
13	Cindy Rondón	12.11.1988	189	61	312	305
14	Prisilla Rivera	29.12.1986	183	67	309	305
15	Cosiri Rodríguez (c)	30.08.1977	191	72	313	305
16	Kenya Moreta	07.04.1981	191	76	310	305
17	Altagracia Mambrú	21.01.1989	180	55	312	302
18	Bethania de la Cruz	13.05.1989	188	58	322	305

== Italy ==
- Head Coach: Marco Bonitta

#	Name	Date of birth	Height	Weight	Spike	Block
1	Serena Ortolani	07.01.1987	187	63	308	288
2	Simona Rinieri (c)	01.09.1977	188	85	307	281
3	Elisa Cella	04.06.1982	186	72	304	286
5	Sara Anzanello	30.07.1980	193	78	316	298
6	Valentina Fiorin	09.10.1984	187	69	305	287
7	Martina Guiggi	01.05.1984	183	69	315	290
8	Paola Paggi	06.12.1976	182	72	306	278
9	Nadia Centoni
10	Stefania Dall'Igna
12	Francesca Piccinini	10.01.1979	180	75	304	279
14	Eleonora Lo Bianco	22.12.1979	172	70	287	273
15	Antonella Del Core	05.11.1980	180	73	296	279
16	Monica Marulli	03.10.1975	196	82	308	284
17	Chiara Arcangeli	14.02.1983	165	57	278	262
18	Monica de Gennaro

== Japan ==
- Head Coach: Shoichi Yanagimoto

#	Name	Date of birth	Height	Weight	Spike	Block
2	Kana Oyama
3	Yoshie Takeshita (c)	18.03.1978	159	55	280	270
4	Megumi Itabashi	07.06.1973	166	60	281	272
5	Miyuki Takahashi	25.12.1978	170	68	285	280
6	Kaoru Sugayama	26.12.1978	169	57	293	269
7	Makiko Horai	06.01.1979	187	68	312	300
9	Sachiko Sugiyama	19.10.1979	184	69	310	305
10	Midori Takahashi	10.03.1980	172	66	290	285
11	Erika Araki
12	Saori Kimura
13	Miki Shimada	29.03.1983	185	70	298	293
14	Shuka Oyama	25.09.1980	182	68	315	309
15	Mari Ochiai	04.01.1982	179	63	301	294
17	Yuki Ishikawa	26.04.1987	180	72	295	286
18	Maiko Kano	15.07.1988	183	65	303	285

== South Korea ==
- Head coach: Kim Hyung-sil

#	Name	Date of birth	Height	Weight	Spike	Block
1	Kim Min-ji	25.05.1985	187	77	304	296
2	Lee Sook-ja	17.06.1980	175	60	286	264
3	Ji Jung-hee	18.03.1985	180	68	305	296
4	Kim Sa-nee (c)	21.06.1981	182	75	302	292
5	La Hea-won	28.06.1986	184	72	302	294
6	Kim Su-ji	11.07.1987	185	69	303	294
7	Yim Myung-ok	05.05.1986	176	65	58	266
8	Koo Ki-lan	10.03.1977	170	64	274	264
9	Kim Mi-jin	22.07.1979	182	65	300	290
10	Lee Jung-ok	19.07.1983	179	72	280	272
11	Han Soo-ji	01.02.1989	182	78	305	296
12	Han Song-yi	05.09.1984	186	69	305	298
13	Jung Dae-young	12.08.1981	183	71	303	292
14	Hwang Youn-joo	13.08.1986	177	68	303	294
15	Kim Se-young	04.06.1981	190	71	309	300
16	Kim Hae-ran	16.03.1984	168	60	280	270
17	Kim Yeon-koung	26.02.1988	190	70	307	299
18	Bae Yoo-na	30.11.1989	181	65	303	294
19	Lim Yu-jin	24.11.1983	180	70	280	270

== Poland ==
- Head Coach: Andrzej Niemczyk

#	Name	Date of birth	Height	Weight	Spike	Block
1	Katarzyna Skowrońska	30.06.1983	189	75	314	296
2	Mariola Zenik	03.07.1982	175	65	300	290
3	Anna Baranska	14.05.1984	178	66	308	292
4	Izabela Bełcik	29.11.1980	185	65	304	292
5	Magdalena Saad	14.05.1985	168	55	277	261
6	Anna Podolec	30.10.1985	193	71	318	305
7	Malgorzata Glinka	30.09.1978	190	84	314	303
8	Dorota Swieniewicz	27.07.1972	180	64	315	305
9	Agata Mroz	07.04.1982	191	74	312	301
10	Joanna Mirek	17.02.1977	186	69	314	306
11	Sylwia Pycia	20.04.1981	190	75	309	302
12	Natalia Bamber	24.02.1982	187	66	311	288
13	Milena Rosner	04.01.1980	180	65	307	292
14	Maria Liktoras	20.02.1975	191	73	312	302
16	Aleksandra Przybysz (c)	02.06.1980	180	70	308	291
17	Kamila Fratczak	25.11.1979	191	73	307	301
18	Marta Pluta	17.02.1982	183	70	295	280

== Russia ==
- Head Coach: Giovanni Caprara

#	Name	Date of birth	Height	Weight	Spike	Block
1	Maria Borodakova	08.03.1986	190	72	305	293
2	Olga Zhitova	25.07.1983	188	72	306	302
3	Ekaterina Osichkina	04.02.1986	190	80	307	300
4	Maria Bruntseva	12.06.1980	188	78	306	303
5	Lioubov Shashkova	04.12.1977	193	72	315	307
6	Elena Godina	17.09.1977	196	72	317	310
7	Natalia Safronova (c)	06.02.1979	192	68	312	305
8	Anna Artamonova	27.09.1980	188	70	306	296
9	Svetlana Kryuchkova	21.02.1985	170	63	290	286
10	Elena Maslova	28.08.1980	178	70	294	287
11	Ekaterina Gamova	17.10.1980	202	80	321	310
12	Marina Sheshenina	26.06.1985	181	62	302	295
13	Olga Fateeva	04.05.1984	188	72	310	303
14	Ekaterina Kabeshova	05.08.1986	170	61	298	290
15	Lesya Makhno	04.09.1981	188	73	310	305
16	Yulia Merkulova	17.02.1984	202	75	317	308
17	Natalia Kulikova	12.05.1982	190	71	312	308
18	Marina Akulova	13.12.1985	184	70	303	290

== Thailand ==
- Head Coach: Sutchai Chanbunchee

#	Name	Date of birth	Height	Weight	Spike	Block
1	Rattanaporn Sanuanram	09.04.1980	180	66	308	297
3	Saymai Paladsrichuay	04.08.1987	180	74	308	291
4	Nurak Nokputta	31.01.1982	178	63	295	280
5	Pleumjit Thinkaow	09.11.1983	180	63	298	281
6	Onuma Sittirak	13.06.1986	175	72	304	285
7	Narumon Khanan	26.01.1983	180	66	311	289
8	Nuntanit Tongsom	15.08.1987	175	58	290	276
9	Piyamas Koijapo	23.10.1978	178	67	298	282
10	Wilavan Apinyapong	06.06.1984	174	68	294	282
11	Amporn Hyapha	19.05.1985	180	70	301	290
12	Kamonporn Sukmak	29.02.1988	174	63	285	275
13	Nootsara Tomkom	07.07.1985	169	57	289	278
14	Patcharee Sangmuang (c)	20.03.1978	181	66	294	279
15	Malika Kanthong	08.01.1987	177	63	292	278
16	Khwanjira Yuttagai	01.09.1986	178	60	287	277
17	Wanna Buakaew	02.01.1981	172	54	292	277
18	Somruk Sungpokeaw	22.02.1985	175	64	275	269

== United States ==
- Head Coach: Lang Ping

#	Name	Date of birth	Height	Weight	Spike	Block
1	Ogonna Nnamani	29.07.1983	185	80	315	305
2	Danielle Scott	01.10.1972	188	84	325	302
3	Tayyiba Haneef	23.03.1979	201	80	318	299
4	Lindsey Berg (c)	16.07.1980	173	81	285	270
6	Elisabeth Bachman	07.11.1978	193	88	319	299
7	Heather Bown	29.11.1978	188	90	301	290
8	Katherine Wilkins	10.05.1982	193	81	309	299
9	Jennifer Joines	23.11.1982	191	82	315	301
10	Therese Crawford	26.08.1976	178	64	312	304
11	Robyn Ah Mow	15.09.1975	172	68	291	281
12	Nancy Metcalf	12.11.1978	186	73	314	292
14	Candace Lee	12.07.1984	170	64	290	270
15	Nicole Davis	24.04.1982	167	73	284	266
17	Jane Collymore	30.09.1984	182	68	315	289
18	Cassandra Busse
19	Lindsey Hunter
