= 2006 FIVB Women's Volleyball World Championship squads =

This article shows the rosters of all participating teams at the 2006 FIVB Women's Volleyball World Championship in Japan.

== Azerbaijan ==
The following is the Azerbaijani roster in the 2006 FIVB Women's Volleyball World Championship.

No.	Name	Date of birth	Height	Weight	Spike	Block	2006 club
2	Kseniya Kovalenko	21 November 1986	190 cm (6 ft 3 in)	78 kg (172 lb)	300 cm (120 in)	295 cm (116 in)	Azeryol BAKU
4	Oksana Kurt	28 July 1984	184 cm (6 ft 0 in)	77 kg (170 lb)	300 cm (120 in)	290 cm (110 in)	Azeryol BAKU
5	Yelena Shabovta	28 August 1969	182 cm (6 ft 0 in)	65 kg (143 lb)	288 cm (113 in)	280 cm (110 in)	Beşiktaş JK
6	Irina Siminyagina	29 November 1984	182 cm (6 ft 0 in)	71 kg (157 lb)	295 cm (116 in)	280 cm (110 in)	Azerrail
7	Yelena Parkhomenko	11 September 1982	186 cm (6 ft 1 in)	68 kg (150 lb)	300 cm (120 in)	293 cm (115 in)	Igtisadchi
8	Natavan Gasimova	8 July 1985	178 cm (5 ft 10 in)	61 kg (134 lb)	287 cm (113 in)	275 cm (108 in)	Azerrail
9	Natalya Mammadova	2 December 1984	196 cm (6 ft 5 in)	78 kg (172 lb)	319 cm (126 in)	302 cm (119 in)	Rabita Baku
10	Oksana Mammadyarova	6 April 1978	177 cm (5 ft 10 in)	66 kg (146 lb)	305 cm (120 in)	290 cm (110 in)	Azerrail
11	Inessa Korkmaz	17 January 1972	190 cm (6 ft 3 in)	78 kg (172 lb)	299 cm (118 in)	293 cm (115 in)	Balakovo
12	Valeriya Korotenko	29 January 1984	171 cm (5 ft 7 in)	62 kg (137 lb)	260 cm (100 in)	255 cm (100 in)	Fenerbahçe SK
15	Aynur Karimova	7 December 1988	189 cm (6 ft 2 in)	66 kg (146 lb)	290 cm (110 in)	280 cm (110 in)	Azerrail
16	Sabina Yarmammadova	6 April 1988	165 cm (5 ft 5 in)	52 kg (115 lb)	250 cm (98 in)	240 cm (94 in)	Nagliatchi

== Brazil ==
The following is the Brazilian roster in the 2006 FIVB Women's Volleyball World Championship.

No.	Name	Date of birth	Height	Weight	Spike	Block	2006 club
1	Walewska Oliveira	1 October 1979	190 cm (6 ft 3 in)	73 kg (161 lb)	310 cm (120 in)	290 cm (110 in)	C. A. V. Murcia
2	Carolina Albuquerque	25 July 1977	182 cm (6 ft 0 in)	76 kg (168 lb)	289 cm (114 in)	279 cm (110 in)	SESI - SP
3	Marianne Steinbrecher	23 August 1983	188 cm (6 ft 2 in)	70 kg (150 lb)	310 cm (120 in)	290 cm (110 in)	FENERBAHÇE SK
4	Paula Pequeno	22 January 1982	184 cm (6 ft 0 in)	74 kg (163 lb)	302 cm (119 in)	285 cm (112 in)	FENERBAHÇE SK
5	Caroline Gattaz	27 July 1981	191 cm (6 ft 3 in)	87 kg (192 lb)	304 cm (120 in)	280 cm (110 in)	UNILEVER
7	Hélia Souza	10 March 1970	173 cm (5 ft 8 in)	65 kg (143 lb)	283 cm (111 in)	264 cm (104 in)	Unilever Volei
9	Fabiana Claudino	24 January 1985	193 cm (6 ft 4 in)	76 kg (168 lb)	314 cm (124 in)	293 cm (115 in)	SESI - SP
10	Welissa Gonzaga	9 September 1982	179 cm (5 ft 10 in)	76 kg (168 lb)	300 cm (120 in)	287 cm (113 in)	Dentil Praia Clube
12	Jaqueline Carvalho	31 December 1983	186 cm (6 ft 1 in)	70 kg (150 lb)	302 cm (119 in)	286 cm (113 in)	Minas Tênis Clube
13	Sheilla Castro	1 July 1983	185 cm (6 ft 1 in)	64 kg (141 lb)	302 cm (119 in)	284 cm (112 in)	Vakıfbank SK İstanbul
14	Fabiana de Oliveira	7 March 1980	169 cm (5 ft 7 in)	59 kg (130 lb)	276 cm (109 in)	266 cm (105 in)	Unilever Volei
17	Renata Colombo	25 February 1981	181 cm (5 ft 11 in)	78 kg (172 lb)	305 cm (120 in)	293 cm (115 in)	Rexona/Ades

== Cameroon ==
The following is the Cameroonian roster in the 2006 FIVB Women's Volleyball World Championship.

No.	Name	Date of birth	Height	Weight	Spike	Block	2006 club
1	Rebecca Rose Ngo Nkot	10 August 1984	185 cm (6 ft 1 in)	80 kg (180 lb)	306 cm (120 in)	288 cm (113 in)	LA ROCHELLE
2	Patricia Ndolo Ngombi	19 September 1976	170 cm (5 ft 7 in)	62 kg (137 lb)	282 cm (111 in)	268 cm (106 in)	BEAUVAIS VB
4	Ruth Diboue	15 May 1974	182 cm (6 ft 0 in)	74 kg (163 lb)	304 cm (120 in)	292 cm (115 in)	HAINAUT VB
5	Marie-Thérèse Ombassa Sombang	12 September 1980	181 cm (5 ft 11 in)	72 kg (159 lb)	295 cm (116 in)	285 cm (112 in)	LAON VB
6	Marguerite Messina Ondoua	24 June 1974	185 cm (6 ft 1 in)	81 kg (179 lb)	307 cm (121 in)	292 cm (115 in)	ENTENTE ST CHAMOND VB
7	Nadine Carole Ambatta Mbeya	18 February 1978	181 cm (5 ft 11 in)	78 kg (172 lb)	295 cm (116 in)	281 cm (111 in)	NEUVILLE SPORT VB
8	Danièle Hortanse Minsili Avebe	1 October 1978	182 cm (6 ft 0 in)	73 kg (161 lb)	305 cm (120 in)	291 cm (115 in)	VANDOEUVRE NANCY VB
9	Rose Beleng À Ngon	30 June 1973	174 cm (5 ft 9 in)	72 kg (159 lb)	287 cm (113 in)	272 cm (107 in)	ENTENTE ST CHAMOND VB
10	Régine Mantbana Ambassa	4 December 1974	183 cm (6 ft 0 in)	79 kg (174 lb)	294 cm (116 in)	281 cm (111 in)	FAP VB
12	Juliette Asta Gamkoua	30 June 1982	180 cm (5 ft 11 in)	72 kg (159 lb)	270 cm (110 in)	265 cm (104 in)	BAFIA VB EVOLUTION
14	Antonia Ahone Ngome	2 September 1983	184 cm (6 ft 0 in)	75 kg (165 lb)	298 cm (117 in)	290 cm (110 in)	AES SONEL VB
15	Viviane Patricia Bella	22 March 1975	183 cm (6 ft 0 in)	76 kg (168 lb)	310 cm (120 in)	293 cm (115 in)	TERVILLE VB

== China ==
The following is the Chinese roster in the 2006 FIVB Women's Volleyball World Championship.

No.	Name	Date of birth	Height	Weight	Spike	Block	2006 club
1	Wang Yimei	11 January 1988	190 cm (6 ft 3 in)	87 kg (192 lb)	318 cm (125 in)	305 cm (120 in)	Liaoning
2	Feng Kun	28 December 1978	183 cm (6 ft 0 in)	75 kg (165 lb)	319 cm (126 in)	310 cm (120 in)	Beijing,
3	Yang Hao	21 March 1980	182 cm (6 ft 0 in)	78 kg (172 lb)	319 cm (126 in)	314 cm (124 in)	Liaoning
4	Liu Yanan	29 September 1980	186 cm (6 ft 1 in)	73 kg (161 lb)	320 cm (130 in)	313 cm (123 in)	Liaoning
5	Chu Jinling	29 July 1984	190 cm (6 ft 3 in)	74 kg (163 lb)	316 cm (124 in)	305 cm (120 in)	Liaoning, CHN
6	Li Shan	21 May 1980	185 cm (6 ft 1 in)	72 kg (159 lb)	318 cm (125 in)	310 cm (120 in)	Tianjin
7	Zhou Suhong	23 April 1979	182 cm (6 ft 0 in)	73 kg (161 lb)	310 cm (120 in)	300 cm (120 in)	Zhejiang, CHN
11	Li Juan	15 May 1981	187 cm (6 ft 2 in)	72 kg (159 lb)	315 cm (124 in)	305 cm (120 in)	Tianjin
12	Song Nina	7 April 1980	179 cm (5 ft 10 in)	65 kg (143 lb)	303 cm (119 in)	293 cm (115 in)	Army
16	Zhang Na	19 April 1980	180 cm (5 ft 11 in)	72 kg (159 lb)	302 cm (119 in)	292 cm (115 in)	Tianjin
17	Xu Yunli	2 August 1987	195 cm (6 ft 5 in)	75 kg (165 lb)	325 cm (128 in)	306 cm (120 in)	Fujian
18	Zhang Ping	23 March 1982	187 cm (6 ft 2 in)	73 kg (161 lb)	312 cm (123 in)	301 cm (119 in)	Tianjin

== Costa Rica ==
The following is the Costa Rican roster in the 2006 FIVB Women's Volleyball World Championship.

No.	Name	Date of birth	Height	Weight	Spike	Block	2006 club
1	Dionisia Thompson	9 June 1978	169 cm (5 ft 7 in)	76 kg (168 lb)	286 cm (113 in)	265 cm (104 in)	Desamparados
2	Irene Fonseca	10 October 1985	180 cm (5 ft 11 in)	70 kg (150 lb)	290 cm (110 in)	278 cm (109 in)	Desamparados
3	Silvia Marín	6 August 1979	164 cm (5 ft 5 in)	63 kg (139 lb)	260 cm (100 in)	253 cm (100 in)	Desamparados
4	Ingrid Morales	29 May 1975	170 cm (5 ft 7 in)	62 kg (137 lb)	289 cm (114 in)	285 cm (112 in)	Goicoechea
5	Karen Cope	6 November 1985	170 cm (5 ft 7 in)	50 kg (110 lb)	315 cm (124 in)	297 cm (117 in)	Universidad de Costa Rica
6	Angela Willis	26 January 1977	188 cm (6 ft 2 in)	67 kg (148 lb)	305 cm (120 in)	290 cm (110 in)	UNED
9	Verania Willis	23 September 1979	182 cm (6 ft 0 in)	73 kg (161 lb)	303 cm (119 in)	285 cm (112 in)	UNED
10	Paola Ramírez	23 February 1987	188 cm (6 ft 2 in)	75 kg (165 lb)	308 cm (121 in)	290 cm (110 in)	UNED
11	Onikha Pinnock	13 May 1984	170 cm (5 ft 7 in)	58 kg (128 lb)	306 cm (120 in)	282 cm (111 in)	Desamparados, CRC
14	Johana Moore	10 March 1978	185 cm (6 ft 1 in)	72 kg (159 lb)	301 cm (119 in)	285 cm (112 in)	Desamparados
15	Catalina Fernández	12 December 1986	180 cm (5 ft 11 in)	68 kg (150 lb)	291 cm (115 in)	274 cm (108 in)	Universidad de Costa Rica
17	Marianela Alfaro	28 March 1985	166 cm (5 ft 5 in)	59 kg (130 lb)	268 cm (106 in)	254 cm (100 in)	Santa Bárbara

== Cuba ==
The following is the Cuban roster in the 2006 FIVB Women's Volleyball World Championship.

No.	Name	Date of birth	Height	Weight	Spike	Block	2006 club
1	Yumilka Ruiz Luaces	8 May 1978	179 cm (5 ft 10 in)	62 kg (137 lb)	329 cm (130 in)	315 cm (124 in)	Camaguey
2	Yanelis Santos Allegne	30 March 1986	183 cm (6 ft 0 in)	71 kg (157 lb)	315 cm (124 in)	312 cm (123 in)	Ciego de Avilas
3	Nancy Carrillo de la Paz	11 January 1986	190 cm (6 ft 3 in)	74 kg (163 lb)	318 cm (125 in)	315 cm (124 in)	Ciudad Habana
4	Yenisey Gonzalez Dias	22 August 1983	193 cm (6 ft 4 in)	70 kg (150 lb)	320 cm (130 in)	305 cm (120 in)	La Habana
6	Daimi Ramirez Echevarria	8 October 1983	176 cm (5 ft 9 in)	67 kg (148 lb)	305 cm (120 in)	290 cm (110 in)	Ciudad Habana
7	Lisbet Arredondo Reyes	22 November 1987	181 cm (5 ft 11 in)	62 kg (137 lb)	315 cm (124 in)	312 cm (123 in)	Villa Clara
8	Yaima Ortiz Charro	9 November 1981	179 cm (5 ft 10 in)	70 kg (150 lb)	325 cm (128 in)	313 cm (123 in)	C. Habana
9	Rachel Sanchez Perez	9 January 1989	188 cm (6 ft 2 in)	75 kg (165 lb)	325 cm (128 in)	320 cm (130 in)	Pinar del Rio
11	Liana Mesa Luaces	26 December 1977	179 cm (5 ft 10 in)	70 kg (150 lb)	318 cm (125 in)	307 cm (121 in)	Camaguey
12	Rosir Kalderon Dias	28 December 1984	191 cm (6 ft 3 in)	76 kg (168 lb)	330 cm (130 in)	325 cm (128 in)	Dinamo Krasnodar
14	Kenia Carcases Opon	22 January 1986	188 cm (6 ft 2 in)	69 kg (152 lb)	308 cm (121 in)	306 cm (120 in)	Holguin
18	Zoila Barros Fernandez	6 August 1976	188 cm (6 ft 2 in)	76 kg (168 lb)	325 cm (128 in)	312 cm (123 in)	Ciudad Habana

== Chinese Taipei ==
The following is the Taiwanese roster in the 2006 FIVB Women's Volleyball World Championship.

No.	Name	Date of birth	Height	Weight	Spike	Block	2006 club
1	Hui Hsuan Yeh	24 April 1988	182 cm (6 ft 0 in)	72 kg (159 lb)	285 cm (112 in)	275 cm (108 in)	Chung Shan
2	Chun Yi Lin	26 September 1983	183 cm (6 ft 0 in)	65 kg (143 lb)	313 cm (123 in)	306 cm (120 in)	TPEC
3	Hui Chen Chen	23 April 1988	173 cm (5 ft 8 in)	65 kg (143 lb)	298 cm (117 in)	290 cm (110 in)	NKNU
6	Mei Ching Chen	19 May 1985	182 cm (6 ft 0 in)	68 kg (150 lb)	297 cm (117 in)	285 cm (112 in)	NTNU
7	Nai Han Kou	21 March 1982	173 cm (5 ft 8 in)	60 kg (130 lb)	295 cm (116 in)	280 cm (110 in)	TPEC
8	Wen Ying Chiu	10 April 1988	160 cm (5 ft 3 in)	58 kg (128 lb)	285 cm (112 in)	275 cm (108 in)	NKNU
9	Shu Li Chen	28 December 1977	178 cm (5 ft 10 in)	70 kg (150 lb)	290 cm (110 in)	280 cm (110 in)	TPEC
10	Hui Fang Szu	29 January 1984	168 cm (5 ft 6 in)	60 kg (130 lb)	280 cm (110 in)	270 cm (110 in)	NTNU
11	Ching I Lin	20 November 1985	180 cm (5 ft 11 in)	66 kg (146 lb)	295 cm (116 in)	283 cm (111 in)	NTNU
13	Hua Yu Tseng	6 October 1986	177 cm (5 ft 10 in)	63 kg (139 lb)	292 cm (115 in)	284 cm (112 in)	NTNU
15	Hsiao Li Wu	11 October 1983	166 cm (5 ft 5 in)	66 kg (146 lb)	288 cm (113 in)	279 cm (110 in)	NTNU
16	Pei Chi Juan	10 August 1983	172 cm (5 ft 8 in)	68 kg (150 lb)	275 cm (108 in)	260 cm (100 in)	NTEU

== Dominican Republic ==
The following is the Dominican Republic roster in the 2006 FIVB Women's Volleyball World Championship.

No.	Name	Date of birth	Height	Weight	Spike	Block	2006 club
1	Annerys Vargas	7 August 1981	195 cm (6 ft 5 in)	70 kg (150 lb)	327 cm (129 in)	320 cm (130 in)	Seleccion Nacional
3	Yudelkys Bautista	5 December 1974	194 cm (6 ft 4 in)	68 kg (150 lb)	320 cm (130 in)	308 cm (121 in)	Mirador
5	Evelyn Carrera	5 October 1971	180 cm (5 ft 11 in)	70 kg (150 lb)	301 cm (119 in)	297 cm (117 in)	Los Prados
6	Carmen Rosa Caso	29 November 1981	168 cm (5 ft 6 in)	59 kg (130 lb)	240 cm (94 in)	230 cm (91 in)	Mirador
9	Nuris Arias	20 May 1973	190 cm (6 ft 3 in)	78 kg (172 lb)	315 cm (124 in)	306 cm (120 in)	Mirador
10	Milagros Cabral	17 October 1978	182 cm (6 ft 0 in)	63 kg (139 lb)	325 cm (128 in)	320 cm (130 in)	Los Cachorros
11	Juana Miguelina González	3 January 1979	185 cm (6 ft 1 in)	70 kg (150 lb)	295 cm (116 in)	290 cm (110 in)	Seleccion Nacional
12	Karla Miguelina Echenique	16 May 1986	181 cm (5 ft 11 in)	62 kg (137 lb)	279 cm (110 in)	300 cm (120 in)	Mirador
13	Cindy Carolina Rondón	12 November 1987	186 cm (6 ft 1 in)	61 kg (134 lb)	320 cm (130 in)	315 cm (124 in)	Seleccion Nacional
14	Prisilla Rivera	29 December 1984	186 cm (6 ft 1 in)	70 kg (150 lb)	320 cm (130 in)	315 cm (124 in)	San Pedro
15	Cosiri Rodríguez	30 August 1977	191 cm (6 ft 3 in)	72 kg (159 lb)	313 cm (123 in)	305 cm (120 in)	San Cristobal
18	Bethania de la Cruz	13 May 1987	188 cm (6 ft 2 in)	70 kg (150 lb)	330 cm (130 in)	320 cm (130 in)	Deportivo Nacional

== Egypt ==
The following is the Egyptian roster in the 2006 FIVB Women's Volleyball World Championship.

No.	Name	Date of birth	Height	Weight	Spike	Block	2006 club
1	Sherihan Abd El Fattah	25 September 1986	180 cm (5 ft 11 in)	71 kg (157 lb)	289 cm (114 in)	279 cm (110 in)	AHLY
3	Menna Allah Mohamed	1 January 1988	181 cm (5 ft 11 in)	79 kg (174 lb)	296 cm (117 in)	283 cm (111 in)	ELSHAMS
4	Miral Abdelkader	16 November 1983	178 cm (5 ft 10 in)	58 kg (128 lb)	282 cm (111 in)	275 cm (108 in)	AHLY
6	Samar Ebeid	17 October 1985	180 cm (5 ft 11 in)	65 kg (143 lb)	287 cm (113 in)	283 cm (111 in)	ELSHAMS
8	Dina Youssef	28 February 1985	172 cm (5 ft 8 in)	69 kg (152 lb)	285 cm (112 in)	280 cm (110 in)	ELSHAMS
9	Yosra Selim	11 April 1981	172 cm (5 ft 8 in)	60 kg (130 lb)	283 cm (111 in)	283 cm (111 in)	AHLY
10	Engy El Shamy	6 September 1986	178 cm (5 ft 10 in)	70 kg (150 lb)	285 cm (112 in)	275 cm (108 in)	ELSHAMS
12	Sara Talaat Ali	1 September 1982	170 cm (5 ft 7 in)	66 kg (146 lb)	269 cm (106 in)	264 cm (104 in)	AHLY
13	Marwa Abd El Razek	2 August 1989	174 cm (5 ft 9 in)	68 kg (150 lb)	288 cm (113 in)	267 cm (105 in)	AHLY
14	Hagar Maged	1 September 1988	180 cm (5 ft 11 in)	71 kg (157 lb)	288 cm (113 in)	272 cm (107 in)	AHLY
15	Mona Badawy	16 January 1982	182 cm (6 ft 0 in)	71 kg (157 lb)	281 cm (111 in)	282 cm (111 in)	AHLY
16	Nada Nassef	11 November 1990	179 cm (5 ft 10 in)	71 kg (157 lb)	291 cm (115 in)	282 cm (111 in)	AHLY

== Germany ==
The following is the German roster in the 2006 FIVB Women's Volleyball World Championship.

No.	Name	Date of birth	Height	Weight	Spike	Block	2006 club
2	Kathleen Weiß	2 February 1984	171 cm (5 ft 7 in)	66 kg (146 lb)	290 cm (110 in)	273 cm (107 in)	Igtisadchi Baku
3	Tanja Hart	24 January 1974	176 cm (5 ft 9 in)	70 kg (150 lb)	291 cm (115 in)	275 cm (108 in)	1. VC Wiesbaden
6	Christina Benecke	14 October 1974	190 cm (6 ft 3 in)	77 kg (170 lb)	314 cm (124 in)	291 cm (115 in)	NA.Hamburg
8	Cornelia Dumler	22 January 1982	180 cm (5 ft 11 in)	68 kg (150 lb)	309 cm (122 in)	285 cm (112 in)	Ostiano
11	Christiane Fürst	29 March 1985	193 cm (6 ft 4 in)	80 kg (180 lb)	323 cm (127 in)	307 cm (121 in)	Eczacıbaşı SK İstanbul
12	Cathrin Schlüter	8 September 1980	185 cm (6 ft 1 in)	60 kg (130 lb)	310 cm (120 in)	295 cm (116 in)	Schweriner SC
15	Angelina Hübner-Grün	2 December 1979	185 cm (6 ft 1 in)	74 kg (163 lb)	309 cm (122 in)	287 cm (113 in)	Rabita BAKU (AZE)
16	Margareta Kozuch	30 October 1986	187 cm (6 ft 2 in)	70 kg (150 lb)	309 cm (122 in)	297 cm (117 in)	RebecchiNordameccanica Piacenz
17	Birgit Thumm	3 July 1980	184 cm (6 ft 0 in)	74 kg (163 lb)	310 cm (120 in)	289 cm (114 in)	VfB Suhl
18	Corina Ssuschke-Voigt	9 May 1983	189 cm (6 ft 2 in)	75 kg (165 lb)	310 cm (120 in)	298 cm (117 in)	Lokomotiv Baku

== Italy ==
The following is the Italian roster in the 2006 FIVB Women's Volleyball World Championship.

No.	Name	Date of birth	Height	Weight	Spike	Block	2006 club
1	Serena Ortolani	7 January 1987	187 cm (6 ft 2 in)	63 kg (139 lb)	308 cm (121 in)	288 cm (113 in)	Pomì Casalmaggiore
2	Simona Rinieri	1 September 1977	188 cm (6 ft 2 in)	85 kg (187 lb)	307 cm (121 in)	281 cm (111 in)	Monte Schiavo
3	Elisa Togut	14 May 1978					Pieralisi Jesi
5	Sara Anzanello	30 July 1980	193 cm (6 ft 4 in)	78 kg (172 lb)	316 cm (124 in)	298 cm (117 in)	Azerrail Baku
6	Valentina Fiorin	9 October 1984	187 cm (6 ft 2 in)	69 kg (152 lb)	305 cm (120 in)	287 cm (113 in)	Foppapedretti Bergamo
7	Martina Guiggi	1 May 1984	187 cm (6 ft 2 in)	80 kg (180 lb)	315 cm (124 in)	290 cm (110 in)	Guangdong Evergrande
8	Stefania Dall'Igna	22 November 1984					Vicenza Volley
9	Nadia Centoni	19 June 1981					VC Padova
10	Paola Paggi	6 December 1976	182 cm (6 ft 0 in)	72 kg (159 lb)	306 cm (120 in)	278 cm (109 in)	Foppapedretti
12	Francesca Piccinini	10 January 1979					Volley Bergamo
14	Eleonora Lo Bianco	22 December 1979	171 cm (5 ft 7 in)	67 kg (148 lb)	287 cm (113 in)	273 cm (107 in)	Galatasaray S.K. İstanbul
17	Paola Cardullo	18 March 1982					Asystel Novara

== Japan ==
The following is the Japanese roster in the 2006 FIVB Women's Volleyball World Championship.

No.	Name	Date of birth	Height	Weight	Spike	Block	2006 club
3	Yoshie Takeshita	18 March 1978					GiapponeJT Marvelous
5	Miyuki Takahashi	25 December 1978					ItaliaVicenza Volley
6	Kaoru Sugayama	26 December 1978	169 cm (5 ft 7 in)	57 kg (126 lb)	293 cm (115 in)	269 cm (106 in)	JT Marvelous
7	Makiko Horai	6 January 1979	187 cm (6 ft 2 in)	68 kg (150 lb)	312 cm (123 in)	300 cm (120 in)	JT Marvelous
9	Sachiko Sugiyama	19 October 1979					NEC Red Rockets
10	Midori Takahashi	10 March 1980	172 cm (5 ft 8 in)	66 kg (146 lb)	290 cm (110 in)	285 cm (112 in)	Toyota Auto Body
11	Erika Araki	3 August 1984					Toray Arrows
12	Saori Kimura	19 August 1986					Toray Arrows
14	Shuka Oyama	25 September 1980	182 cm (6 ft 0 in)	70 kg (150 lb)	315 cm (124 in)	295 cm (116 in)	Hisamitsu Springs
15	Mari Ochiai	4 January 1982	179 cm (5 ft 10 in)	63 kg (139 lb)	301 cm (119 in)	294 cm (116 in)	Hisamitsu Springs
16	Akiko Ino	28 September 1986					Hitachi Rivale
17	Yuki Ishikawa	26 April 1987	181 cm (5 ft 11 in)	68 kg (150 lb)	302 cm (119 in)	286 cm (113 in)	JT Marvelous

== Kazakhstan ==
The following is the Kazakhstani roster in the 2006 FIVB Women's Volleyball World Championship.

No.	Name	Date of birth	Height	Weight	Spike	Block	2006 club
1	Natalya Rykova	29 March 1980					
4	Olga Karpova	10 June 1980					
5	Yuliya Kutsko	18 April 1980					
6	Olga Nassedkina	28 December 1982					
7	Olga Kubassevich						
8	Korinna Ishimtseva	8 February 1984					
9	Xeniya Ilyuchshenko	29 May 1979					
10	Yelena Ezau	9 March 1893					
11	Olga Grushko	7 April 1976					
13	Yelena Pavlova	12 December 1978					
16	Inna Matveyeva	12 October 1978	186 cm (6 ft 1 in)	70 kg (150 lb)	303 cm (119 in)	294 cm (116 in)	Irtysh-Kazchrom
17	Xeniya Imangaliyeva	24 May 1981	183 cm	65 kg	303 cm	290 cm	

== Kenya ==
The following is the Kenyan roster in the 2006 FIVB Women's Volleyball World Championship.

No.	Name	Date of birth	Height	Weight	Spike	Block	2006 club
1	Jane Wairimu	24 March 1985	174 cm (5 ft 9 in)	60 kg (130 lb)	300 cm (120 in)	285 cm (112 in)	Kenya Prisons
4	Doris Palang'A	2 January 1982	170 cm (5 ft 7 in)	76 kg (168 lb)	303 cm (119 in)	284 cm (112 in)	Kenya Commercial Bank
5	Lucy Chege	15 November 1976	171 cm (5 ft 7 in)	63 kg (139 lb)	300 cm (120 in)	282 cm (111 in)	Kenya Pipeline Company
6	Catherine Wanjiru	7 August 1978	180 cm (5 ft 11 in)	87 kg (192 lb)	300 cm (120 in)	292 cm (115 in)	Kenya Pipeline Company
7	Jannet Wanja	24 February 1984	175 cm (5 ft 9 in)	59 kg (130 lb)	299 cm (118 in)	287 cm (113 in)	Kenya Pipeline Company
8	Mildred Odwako	17 January 1980	175 cm (5 ft 9 in)	63 kg (139 lb)	280 cm (110 in)	270 cm (110 in)	Kenya Pipeline Company
9	Dorcas Ndasaba	31 March 1971	174 cm (5 ft 9 in)	73 kg (161 lb)	310 cm (120 in)	306 cm (120 in)	Kenya Commercial Bank
11	Jackline Barasa	25 December 1979	180 cm (5 ft 11 in)	86 kg (190 lb)	300 cm (120 in)	288 cm (113 in)	Kenya Commercial Bank
12	Lydia Maiyo	3 November 1988	185 cm (6 ft 1 in)	75 kg (165 lb)	325 cm (128 in)	315 cm (124 in)	Kenya Prisons
13	Leonidas Kamende	28 August 1979	181 cm (5 ft 11 in)	78 kg (172 lb)	305 cm (120 in)	290 cm (110 in)	Kenya Pipeline Company
15	Brackcides Khadambi	14 May 1984	180 cm (5 ft 11 in)	70 kg (150 lb)	310 cm (120 in)	306 cm (120 in)	Kenya Prisons
16	Judith Tarus	26 June 1986	170 cm (5 ft 7 in)	60 kg (130 lb)	260 cm (100 in)	256 cm (101 in)	Kenya Prisons

== Mexico ==
The following is the Mexican roster in the 2006 FIVB Women's Volleyball World Championship.

No.	Name	Date of birth	Height	Weight	Spike	Block	2006 club
1	Yendy Cortinas	4 July 1982	185 cm (6 ft 1 in)	71 kg (157 lb)	296 cm (117 in)	294 cm (116 in)	COAHUILA
2	Migdalel Ruiz	3 March 1983	180 cm (5 ft 11 in)	75 kg (165 lb)	307 cm (121 in)	298 cm (117 in)	UANL
3	Celida Cordova	1 August 1980	174 cm (5 ft 9 in)	68 kg (150 lb)	282 cm (111 in)	272 cm (107 in)	DURANGO
4	Selena Barajas	22 January 1982	183 cm (6 ft 0 in)	74 kg (163 lb)	300 cm (120 in)	292 cm (115 in)	COLIMA
5	Nancy Ortega	31 March 1990	170 cm (5 ft 7 in)	68 kg (150 lb)	285 cm (112 in)	273 cm (107 in)	BAJA CALIFORNIA
7	Bibiana Candelas	2 December 1983	196 cm (6 ft 5 in)	78 kg (172 lb)	310 cm (120 in)	302 cm (119 in)	
10	Martha Revuelta	6 September 1986	176 cm (5 ft 9 in)	77 kg (170 lb)	295 cm (116 in)	287 cm (113 in)	IMSS VALLE DE MEXICO
11	Blanca Chan	26 July 1981	182 cm (6 ft 0 in)	75 kg (165 lb)	298 cm (117 in)	286 cm (113 in)	SINALOA
12	Claudia Rodriguez	10 August 1981	191 cm (6 ft 3 in)	95 kg (209 lb)	315 cm (124 in)	305 cm (120 in)	IMSS VALLE DE MEXICO
13	Mariana Lopez	30 August 1985	178 cm (5 ft 10 in)	69 kg (152 lb)	295 cm (116 in)	286 cm (113 in)	DISTRITO FEDERAL
14	Alejandra Acosta	1 July 1986	177 cm (5 ft 10 in)	75 kg (165 lb)	290 cm (110 in)	284 cm (112 in)	JALISCO
17	Zaira Orellana	3 May 1989	183 cm (6 ft 0 in)	63 kg (139 lb)	295 cm (116 in)	287 cm (113 in)	JALISCO

== Netherlands ==
The following is the Dutch roster in the 2006 FIVB Women's Volleyball World Championship.

No.	Name	Date of birth	Height	Weight	Spike	Block	2006 club
1	Kim Staelens	7 January 1982	182 cm (6 ft 0 in)	78 kg (172 lb)	305 cm (120 in)	301 cm (119 in)	Stiinta Bacau
4	Chaïne Staelens	7 November 1980	194 cm (6 ft 4 in)	77 kg (170 lb)	316 cm (124 in)	299 cm (118 in)	
6	Mirjam Orsel	1 April 1978	192 cm (6 ft 4 in)	74 kg (163 lb)	306 cm (120 in)	292 cm (115 in)	ARKE/Pollux Oldenzaal
8	Alice Blom	7 April 1980	178 cm (5 ft 10 in)	64 kg (141 lb)	305 cm (120 in)	280 cm (110 in)	Iqtisadci University Baku
9	Floortje Meijners	16 January 1987	190 cm (6 ft 3 in)	75 kg (165 lb)	311 cm (122 in)	283 cm (111 in)	La Yamamay Busto Arsizio
10	Janneke Van Tienen	29 May 1979	177 cm (5 ft 10 in)	73 kg (161 lb)	294 cm (116 in)	273 cm (107 in)	
11	Caroline Wensink	4 August 1984	186 cm (6 ft 1 in)	80 kg (180 lb)	309 cm (122 in)	305 cm (120 in)	Azerrail Baku
12	Manon Nummerdor-Flier	8 February 1984	192 cm (6 ft 4 in)	71 kg (157 lb)	315 cm (124 in)	301 cm (119 in)	Zhengrong Fujian
14	Riëtte Fledderus	18 October 1977	171 cm (5 ft 7 in)	75 kg (165 lb)	288 cm (113 in)	268 cm (106 in)	DELA Marinus
15	Ingrid Visser	4 June 1977	190 cm (6 ft 3 in)	74 kg (163 lb)	314 cm (124 in)	298 cm (117 in)	Murcia 2005
16	Debby Stam-Pilon	24 July 1984	184 cm (6 ft 0 in)	69 kg (152 lb)	303 cm (119 in)	281 cm (111 in)	

== Peru ==
The following is the Peruvian roster in the 2006 FIVB Women's Volleyball World Championship.

No.	Name	Date of birth	Height	Weight	Spike	Block	2006 club
1	Sara Joya Lobaton	22 February 1976	182 cm (6 ft 0 in)	70 kg (150 lb)	298 cm (117 in)	295 cm (116 in)	DEGIRMENDERE
2	Mirtha Uribe	12 March 1985	184 cm (6 ft 0 in)	67 kg (148 lb)	297 cm (117 in)	286 cm (113 in)	Deportivo Jaamsa
3	Veronica Contreras	8 June 1977	178 cm (5 ft 10 in)	63 kg (139 lb)	280 cm (110 in)	282 cm (111 in)	A. PINGUELA
4	Patricia Soto	10 February 1980	179 cm (5 ft 10 in)	67 kg (148 lb)	300 cm (120 in)	295 cm (116 in)	CLUB DE REGATAS LIMA
5	Vanessa Palacios	3 July 1984	167 cm (5 ft 6 in)	66 kg (146 lb)	275 cm (108 in)	260 cm (100 in)	DIVINO MAESTRO
6	Carla Tristan	29 January 1988	180 cm (5 ft 11 in)	67 kg (148 lb)	297 cm (117 in)	295 cm (116 in)	ALIANZA LIMA
7	Yulissa Zamudio Ore	24 March 1976	184 cm (6 ft 0 in)	61 kg (134 lb)	315 cm (124 in)	300 cm (120 in)	U. San Martin de Porres
8	Milagros Moy	17 October 1975	178 cm (5 ft 10 in)	72 kg (159 lb)	296 cm (117 in)	282 cm (111 in)	ALBACETE
9	Natalia Romanova	12 November 1972	185 cm (6 ft 1 in)	69 kg (152 lb)	298 cm (117 in)	303 cm (119 in)	Regatas Lima
10	Leyla Chihuan	4 September 1975	180 cm (5 ft 11 in)	67 kg (148 lb)	306 cm (120 in)	296 cm (117 in)	REGATAS LIMA
11	Luren Baylon Francis	14 August 1977	180 cm (5 ft 11 in)	68 kg (150 lb)	310 cm (120 in)	305 cm (120 in)	CV CIUTADELLA
14	Elena Keldibekova	23 June 1974	177 cm (5 ft 10 in)	72 kg (159 lb)	289 cm (114 in)	280 cm (110 in)	REGATAS LIMA

== Poland ==
The following is the Polish roster in the 2006 FIVB Women's Volleyball World Championship.

No.	Name	Date of birth	Height	Weight	Spike	Block	2006 club
1	Katarzyna Skowrońska	30 June 1983	189 cm (6 ft 2 in)	75 kg (165 lb)	314 cm (124 in)	296 cm (117 in)	Rabita Baku
2	Mariola Zenik	3 July 1982	175 cm (5 ft 9 in)	65 kg (143 lb)	300 cm (120 in)	295 cm (116 in)	Bank BPS Muszynianka
4	Izabela Belcik	29 November 1980	185 cm (6 ft 1 in)	65 kg (143 lb)	304 cm (120 in)	292 cm (115 in)	Atom Trefl
6	Anna Podolec	30 October 1985	193 cm (6 ft 4 in)	71 kg (157 lb)	318 cm (125 in)	305 cm (120 in)	Avtodor-Metar
10	Joanna Mirek	17 February 1977	187 cm (6 ft 2 in)	69 kg (152 lb)	314 cm (124 in)	306 cm (120 in)	Muszynianka
11	Sylwia Pycia	20 April 1981	190 cm (6 ft 3 in)	75 kg (165 lb)	309 cm (122 in)	302 cm (119 in)	Pronar Zeta
12	Natalia Bamber-Laskowska	24 February 1982	187 cm (6 ft 2 in)	66 kg (146 lb)	311 cm (122 in)	288 cm (113 in)	BKS Aluprof
13	Milena Rosner	4 January 1980	179 cm (5 ft 10 in)	67 kg (148 lb)	307 cm (121 in)	292 cm (115 in)	Foppapedretti
14	Maria Liktoras	20 February 1975	191 cm (6 ft 3 in)	73 kg (161 lb)	312 cm (123 in)	302 cm (119 in)	Dinamo
15	Katarzyna Skorupa	16 September 1984					BKS Bielsko-Biała
17	Kamila Frątczak	25 November 1979	191 cm (6 ft 3 in)	73 kg (161 lb)	307 cm (121 in)	301 cm (119 in)	Muszynianka
18	Paulina Maj	22 March 1987					BKS Bielsko-Biała

== Puerto Rico ==
The following is the Puerto Rican roster in the 2006 FIVB Women's Volleyball World Championship.

No.	Name	Date of birth	Height	Weight	Spike	Block	2006 club
1	Xaimara Colon	11 September 1988	176 cm (5 ft 9 in)	62 kg (137 lb)	255 cm (100 in)	246 cm (97 in)	Carolina Gigantes
3	Vilmarie Mojica	13 August 1985	180 cm (5 ft 11 in)	63 kg (139 lb)	295 cm (116 in)	288 cm (113 in)	Caguas
4	Tatiana Encarnación	28 July 1985	182 cm (6 ft 0 in)	72 kg (159 lb)	300 cm (120 in)	279 cm (110 in)	Lancheras de Catano
5	Sarai Alvarez	3 April 1986	183 cm (6 ft 0 in)	61 kg (134 lb)	295 cm (116 in)	286 cm (113 in)	Mayaguez
6	Yarleen Santiago	18 January 1978	182 cm (6 ft 0 in)	72 kg (159 lb)	305 cm (120 in)	287 cm (113 in)	Carolina
8	Eva Cruz	22 January 1974	182 cm (6 ft 0 in)	72 kg (159 lb)	305 cm (120 in)	290 cm (110 in)	Juncos
9	Aurea Cruz	10 January 1982	180 cm (5 ft 11 in)	63 kg (139 lb)	310 cm (120 in)	290 cm (110 in)	Carolina
11	Karina Ocasio	1 August 1985	192 cm (6 ft 4 in)	76 kg (168 lb)	298 cm (117 in)	288 cm (113 in)	Caguas
14	Glorimar Ortega	21 November 1983	179 cm (5 ft 10 in)	70 kg (150 lb)	297 cm (117 in)	285 cm (112 in)	Caguas
16	Alexandra Oquendo	3 February 1984	189 cm (6 ft 2 in)	75 kg (165 lb)	297 cm (117 in)	284 cm (112 in)	Caguas
17	Sheila Ocasio	17 November 1982	195 cm (6 ft 5 in)	74 kg (163 lb)	310 cm (120 in)	292 cm (115 in)	Juncos
18	Jetzabel Del Valle	19 December 1979	185 cm (6 ft 1 in)	73 kg (161 lb)	305 cm (120 in)	292 cm (115 in)	Humacao

== Russia ==
The following is the Russian roster in the 2006 FIVB Women's Volleyball World Championship.

No.	Name	Date of birth	Height	Weight	Spike	Block	2006 club
1	Maria Borisenko	8 March 1986	190 cm (6 ft 3 in)	80 kg (180 lb)	301 cm (119 in)	297 cm (117 in)	Dinamo-Kazan
2	Olga Zhitova	25 July 1983	188 cm (6 ft 2 in)	72 kg (159 lb)	306 cm (120 in)	302 cm (119 in)	Dinamo M.R.
4	Maria Bruntseva	12 June 1980	188 cm (6 ft 2 in)	78 kg (172 lb)	306 cm (120 in)	303 cm (119 in)	Stinol
5	Liubov Shashkova	4 December 1977	192 cm (6 ft 4 in)	72 kg (159 lb)	315 cm (124 in)	307 cm (121 in)	Dinamo Krasnodar
6	Elena Godina	17 September 1977	196 cm (6 ft 5 in)	72 kg (159 lb)	317 cm (125 in)	310 cm (120 in)	Dinamo
7	Natalya Safronova	6 February 1979	190 cm (6 ft 3 in)	77 kg (170 lb)	312 cm (123 in)	305 cm (120 in)	Dinamo
9	Svetlana Kryuchkova	21 February 1985	174 cm (5 ft 9 in)	63 kg (139 lb)	290 cm (110 in)	286 cm (113 in)	Dinamo Krasnodar
11	Ekaterina Gamova	17 October 1980	205 cm (6 ft 9 in)	80 kg (180 lb)	321 cm (126 in)	310 cm (120 in)	Dinamo-Kazan
12	Marina Babeshina	26 June 1985	181 cm (5 ft 11 in)	62 kg (137 lb)	291 cm (115 in)	289 cm (114 in)	Uralochka-NTMK
16	Iuliia Merkulova	17 February 1984	202 cm (6 ft 8 in)	75 kg (165 lb)	317 cm (125 in)	308 cm (121 in)	Dinamo Krasnodar
17	Natalia Kulikova	12 May 1982	184 cm (6 ft 0 in)	71 kg (157 lb)	312 cm (123 in)	308 cm (121 in)	Samorodok
18	Marina Akulova	13 December 1985	181 cm (5 ft 11 in)	70 kg (150 lb)	303 cm (119 in)	290 cm (110 in)	Omichka

== Serbia and Montenegro ==
The following is the Serbia and Montenegro roster in the 2006 FIVB Women's Volleyball World Championship.

No.	Name	Date of birth	Height	Weight	Spike	Block	2006 club
1	Jelena Nikolić	13 April 1982	194 cm (6 ft 4 in)	79 kg (174 lb)	315 cm (124 in)	300 cm (120 in)	Vakıfbank SK İstanbul (TUR)
2	Aleksandra Ranković	8 July 1980	187 cm (6 ft 2 in)	67 kg (148 lb)	305 cm (120 in)	292 cm (115 in)	Şahinbey Belediyespor (TUR)
3	Ivana Đerisilo-Stanković	8 August 1983	185 cm (6 ft 1 in)	72 kg (159 lb)	306 cm (120 in)	291 cm (115 in)	Eczacıbaşı SK İstanbul (TUR)
5	Nataša Krsmanović	19 June 1985	188 cm (6 ft 2 in)	73 kg (161 lb)	305 cm (120 in)	285 cm (112 in)	RABITA Baku (AZE)
6	Jovana Brakočević	5 March 1988	196 cm (6 ft 5 in)	82 kg (181 lb)	309 cm (122 in)	295 cm (116 in)	Vakıfbank SK İstanbul (TUR)
7	Brižitka Molnar	28 July 1985	182 cm (6 ft 0 in)	69 kg (152 lb)	304 cm (120 in)	290 cm (110 in)	ATOM TREFL (POL)
9	Jovana Vesović	21 June 1987					Jedinstvo Užice (SCG)
10	Maja Ognjenović	6 August 1984	183 cm (6 ft 0 in)	67 kg (148 lb)	290 cm (110 in)	270 cm (110 in)	CHEMIC Police SA (POL)
11	Vesna Čitaković	3 February 1979	187 cm (6 ft 2 in)	75 kg (165 lb)	305 cm (120 in)	300 cm (120 in)	Eczacıbaşı SK İstanbul (TUR)
13	Maja Simanić	8 February 1980	180 cm (5 ft 11 in)	70 kg (150 lb)	280 cm (110 in)	270 cm (110 in)	Şahinbey Belediyespor (TUR)
15	Anja Spasojević	4 July 1983	187 cm (6 ft 2 in)	75 kg (165 lb)	308 cm (121 in)	300 cm (120 in)	Asystel Novara (ITA)
18	Suzana Ćebić	9 November 1984					Jedinstvo Užice (SCG)

== South Korea ==
The following is the South Korean roster in the 2006 FIVB Women's Volleyball World Championship.

No.	Name	Date of birth	Height	Weight	Spike	Block	2006 club
4	Kim Sa-nee	21 June 1981	180 cm (5 ft 11 in)	75 kg (165 lb)	302 cm (119 in)	292 cm (115 in)	Heungkuk Life Insurance Co.
5	Nam Jie-youn	25 May 1983	172 cm (5 ft 8 in)	63 kg (139 lb)	285 cm (112 in)	273 cm (107 in)	IBK
7	Han Yoo-mi	5 February 1982	180 cm (5 ft 11 in)	65 kg (143 lb)	307 cm (121 in)	297 cm (117 in)	Korea Ginseng Corp.
9	Kim Ji-hyun	10 October 1984	185 cm (6 ft 1 in)	74 kg (163 lb)	305 cm (120 in)	295 cm (116 in)	Korea Highway corp.
10	Kim Yeon-koung	26 February 1988	192 cm (6 ft 4 in)	73 kg (161 lb)	307 cm (121 in)	299 cm (118 in)	FENERBAHCE
11	Han Soo-ji	1 February 1989	182 cm (6 ft 0 in)	78 kg (172 lb)	305 cm (120 in)	296 cm (117 in)	Korea Ginseng Corp.
12	Han Song-yi	5 September 1984	186 cm (6 ft 1 in)	65 kg (143 lb)	305 cm (120 in)	298 cm (117 in)	GS Caltex
13	Jung Dae-young	12 August 1981	183 cm (6 ft 0 in)	71 kg (157 lb)	303 cm (119 in)	292 cm (115 in)	GS Caltex
14	Hwang Youn-joo	13 August 1986	177 cm (5 ft 10 in)	68 kg (150 lb)	303 cm (119 in)	294 cm (116 in)	Hyundai Construction
15	Kim Se-young	4 June 1981	190 cm (6 ft 3 in)	73 kg (161 lb)	309 cm (122 in)	300 cm (120 in)	Hyundai Construction
16	Kim Hae-ran	16 March 1984	168 cm (5 ft 6 in)	60 kg (130 lb)	280 cm (110 in)	270 cm (110 in)	Korea Expressway
18	Bae Yoo-na	30 November 1989	180 cm (5 ft 11 in)	67 kg (148 lb)	303 cm (119 in)	294 cm (116 in)	GS Caltex

== Turkey ==
The following is the Turkish roster in the 2006 FIVB Women's Volleyball World Championship.

No.	Name	Date of birth	Height	Weight	Spike	Block	2006 club
1	Bahar Mert	13 December 1975	180 cm (5 ft 11 in)	61 kg (134 lb)	290 cm (110 in)	286 cm (113 in)	ECZACIBAŞI SK İSTANBUL
2	Gülden Kayalar Kuzubaşıoğlu	5 December 1980	167 cm (5 ft 6 in)	56 kg (123 lb)	281 cm (111 in)	275 cm (108 in)	ECZACIBAŞI SK İSTANBUL
4	Özlem Özçelik	1 January 1972	191 cm (6 ft 3 in)	73 kg (161 lb)	315 cm (124 in)	309 cm (122 in)	DYNAMO MOSCOW
5	Aysun Özbek	18 March 1977	183 cm (6 ft 0 in)	73 kg (161 lb)	305 cm (120 in)	300 cm (120 in)	VAKIFBANK GÜNES SIGORTA
7	Natalia Hanikoğlu	23 June 1975	190 cm (6 ft 3 in)	76 kg (168 lb)	308 cm (121 in)	302 cm (119 in)	Galatasaray S.K. İstanbul
9	Deniz Hakyemez Çetin Saraç	3 February 1983	187 cm (6 ft 2 in)	72 kg (159 lb)	300 cm (120 in)	295 cm (116 in)	GALATASARAY S.K.
10	Gözde Kırdar Sonsırma	26 June 1985	183 cm (6 ft 0 in)	70 kg (150 lb)	297 cm (117 in)	292 cm (115 in)	Vakıfbank SK İstanbul
12	Esra Gümüş	2 October 1982	181 cm (5 ft 11 in)	76 kg (168 lb)	305 cm (120 in)	297 cm (117 in)	ECZACIBAŞI SK İSTANBUL
14	Nedime Elif Agca Öner	10 February 1984	186 cm (6 ft 1 in)	72 kg (159 lb)	300 cm (120 in)	310 cm (120 in)	ECZACIBAŞI SK İSTANBUL
15	Eda Erdem	22 June 1987	187 cm (6 ft 2 in)	75 kg (165 lb)	308 cm (121 in)	302 cm (119 in)	FENERBAHÇE SK
16	Seda Tokatlıoğlu	25 June 1986	192 cm (6 ft 4 in)	70 kg (150 lb)	312 cm (123 in)	304 cm (120 in)	FENERBAHÇE SK
17	Neslihan Darnel	9 December 1983	187 cm (6 ft 2 in)	72 kg (159 lb)	315 cm (124 in)	306 cm (120 in)	VAKIFBANK GÜNES SIGORTA

== United States ==
The following is the American roster in the 2006 FIVB Women's Volleyball World Championship.

No.	Name	Date of birth	Height	Weight	Spike	Block	2006 club
2	Danielle Scott-Arruda	1 October 1972	188 cm (6 ft 2 in)	84 kg (185 lb)	325 cm (128 in)	302 cm (119 in)	Praia Clube
3	Tayyiba Haneef-Park	23 March 1979	201 cm (6 ft 7 in)	82 kg (181 lb)	328 cm (129 in)	312 cm (123 in)	Igtisadchi Baku
5	Sarah Drury	17 June 1981	165 cm	59 kg	286 cm	268 cm	
7	Heather Bown	29 November 1978	188 cm (6 ft 2 in)	90 kg (200 lb)	301 cm (119 in)	290 cm (110 in)	Azerrail Baku
8	Katherine Wilkins	10 May 1982	193 cm (6 ft 4 in)	81 kg (179 lb)	309 cm (122 in)	299 cm (118 in)	USA National Team
9	Jennifer Tamas	23 November 1982	191 cm (6 ft 3 in)	82 kg (181 lb)	315 cm (124 in)	301 cm (119 in)	Azerrail Baku
10	Therese Crawford	26 August 1976	178 cm (5 ft 10 in)	64 kg (141 lb)	312 cm (123 in)	304 cm (120 in)	USA National Team
11	Robyn Ah Mow-Santos	15 September 1975	172 cm (5 ft 8 in)	67 kg (148 lb)	291 cm (115 in)	281 cm (111 in)	VBC Volero Zurich
12	Nancy Metcalf	12 November 1978	186 cm (6 ft 1 in)	73 kg (161 lb)	314 cm (124 in)	292 cm (115 in)	Lokomotiv Baku
15	Nicole Davis	24 April 1982	167 cm (5 ft 6 in)	73 kg (161 lb)	284 cm (112 in)	266 cm (105 in)	E.S. Cannet Rocheville VB
16	Lindsey Hunter	30 March 1984					
18	Cassandra Busse	15 June 1982					

== See also ==
- 2006 FIVB Volleyball Men's World Championship squads
