= Carolina Albuquerque =

Brazilian volleyball player (born 1977)

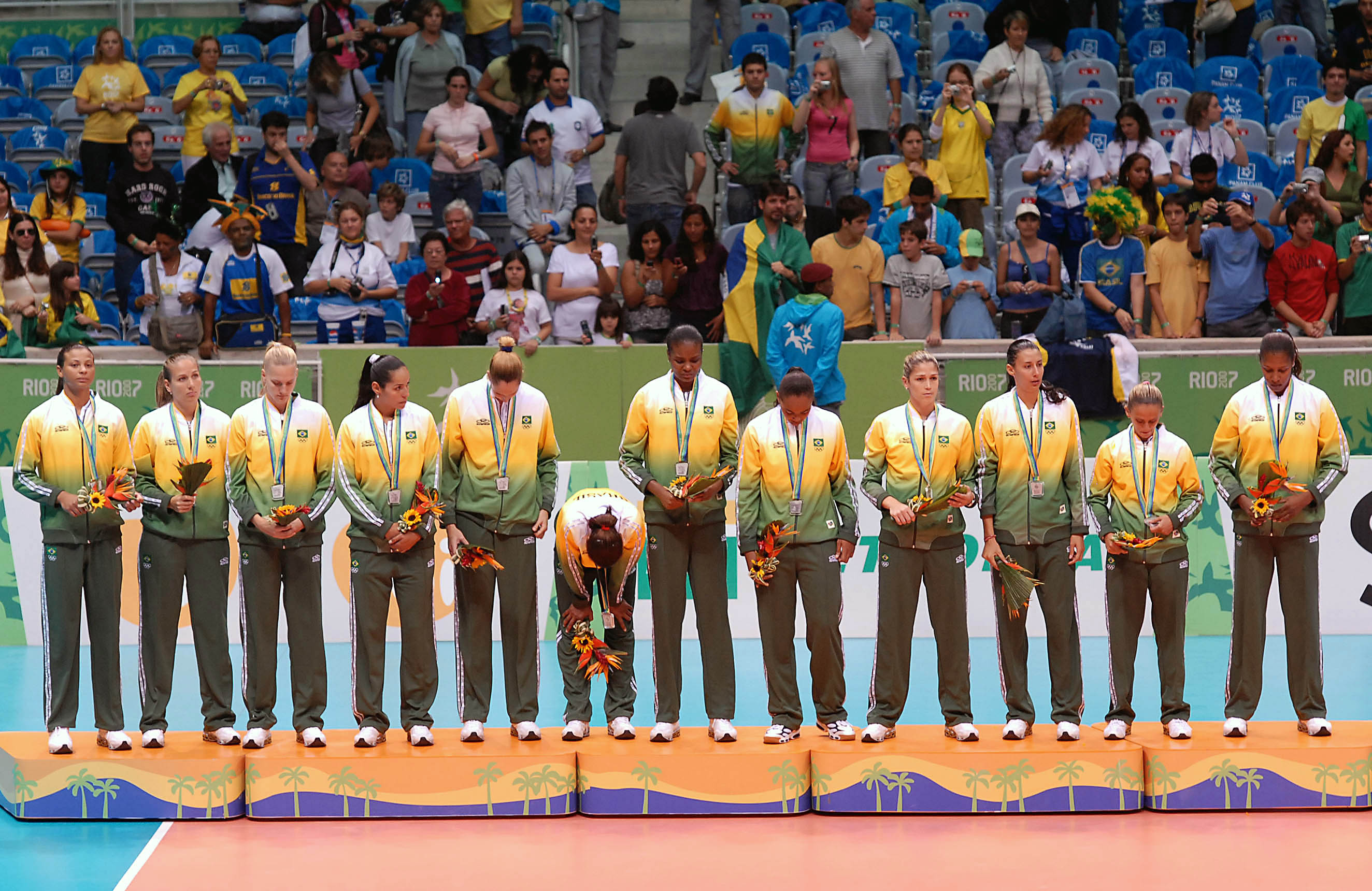
- On the podium at the 2007 Pan American Games after winning silver

Personal information
- Full name: Carolina Demartini de Albuquerque
- Nickname: Carol
- Nationality: Brazilian
- Born: 25 July 1977 (age 49); Porto Alegre, Rio Grande do Sul
- Height: 1.82 m (6 ft 0 in)
- Weight: 76 kg (168 lb)
- Spike: 289 cm (114 in)
- Block: 279 cm (110 in)

Volleyball information
- Position: Setter
- Current club: Retired
- Number: 2

National team
1997–2008	Brazil
Honours
Women's volleyball
Representing Brazil
Olympic Games
Gold medal – first place	2008 Beijing	Team
World Championship
Silver medal – second place	2006 Japan	Team
World Grand Champions Cup
Gold medal – first place	2005 Japan	Team
World Grand Prix
Gold medal – first place	2005 Sendai	Team
Gold medal – first place	2006 Reggio Calabria	Team
Gold medal – first place	2008 Yokohama	Team
Silver medal – second place	1999 Yu Xi
Pan American Games
Gold medal – first place	1999 Winnipeg
Silver medal – second place	2007 Rio de Janeiro	Team
Final Four Cup
Gold medal – first place	2008 Fortaleza

Carolina Albuquerque (born 25 July 1977) is a Brazilian retired volleyball player. She won the gold medal with the Brazilian national team in the 2008 Summer Olympics in Beijing, China.

== Career ==
Albuquerque won the bronze medal in the 2014 FIVB Club World Championship after her team defeated the Swiss club Voléro Zürich 3-2.

== Clubs ==
- (Brazil) Grêmio Náutico União (1991–1993)
- (Brazil) Pinheiros (1995–2001)
- (Brazil) Osasco (2001–2002)
- (Brazil) Macaé Sports (2002–2004)
- (Brazil) Osasco (2004–2006)
- (Brazil) Macaé Sports (2006–2007)
- (Brazil) Osasco (2007–2011)
- (Spain) UCAM Voley Murcia (2011–2012)
- (Brazil) SESI-São Paulo (2012–2015)
- (Brazil) Osasco (2016–2019)
- (Greece) PAOK (2019–2020)
- (Brazil) Osasco (2020–2021)

== Awards ==
=== Clubs ===
- 2001/02 Brazilian Superliga – Runner up, with BCN/Osasco
- 2004/05 Brazilian Superliga – Champion, with Finasa/Osasco
- 2005/06 Brazilian Superliga – Runner up, with Finasa/Osasco
- 2007/08 Brazilian Superliga – Runner up, with Finasa/Osasco
- 2008/09 Brazilian Superliga – Runner up, with Finasa/Osasco
- 2009/10 Brazilian Superliga – Champion, with Sollys Osasco
- 2013/14 Brazilian Superliga – Runner up, with SESI-SP
- 2016/17 Brazilian Superliga – Runner up, with Vôlei Nestlé
- 2010 FIVB Club World Championship – Runner up, with Sollys Osasco
- 2014 FIVB Club World Championship – Bronze medal, with SESI-SP

=== Individuals ===
- 2009 South American Club Championship "Best Setter"
- 2010 South American Club Championship "Best Setter"
- 2010 FIVB Club World Championship "Best Setter"

Awards
Preceded by Unknown	Best Setter of FIVB Club World Championship; 2010	Succeeded by (Ukraine) Iryna Zhukova
