= Volleyball at the 2007 Pan American Games – Women's team rosters =

This article show all participating team squads at the 2007 Pan American Games, played by eight countries held in Rio de Janeiro, Brazil.

== Brazil ==
- Head Coach: José Roberto Guimarães

#	Name	Date of Birth	Height	Weight	Spike	Block
1	Walewska Oliveira	01.10.1979	190	73	310	290
2	Carolina Albuquerque	25.07.1977	182	76	289	279
3	Marianne Steinbrecher	23.08.1983	188	70	310	290
4	Paula Pequeno	22.01.1982	184	74	302	285
6	Thaisa Menezes	15.05.1987	196	79	316	301
7	Hélia Souza (c)	10.03.1970	173	63	283	264
9	Fabiana Claudino	24.01.1985	193	76	314	293
10	Welissa Gonzaga	09.09.1982	179	76	300	287
11	Erika Coimbra	23.03.1980	180	64	301	280
13	Sheilla Castro	01.07.1983	185	64	302	284
14	Fabiana de Oliveira	07.03.1980	169	59	276	266
15	Regiane Bidias	02.10.1986	189	74	304	286

== Costa Rica ==
- Head Coach: Eladio Vargas

#	Name	Date of Birth	Height	Weight	Spike	Block
1	Karen Cope
2	Catalina Fernández
6	Angela Willis
7	Mariela Quesada
9	Verania Willis (c)
10	Paola Ramírez
12	Angélica Jiménez
13	Janelle Johnson
14	Irene Fonseca
16	Kimberly Palmer
17	Marianela Alfaro

== Cuba ==
- Head Coach: Antonio Perdomo

#	Name	Date of Birth	Height	Weight	Spike	Block
1	Yumilka Ruiz (c)	08.05.1978	180	63	326	305
2	Yanelis Santos	30.03.1986	183	71	315	312
3	Nancy Carrillo	11.01.1986	190	74	318	315
4	Yenisey González	23.08.1983	193	67	315	312
6	Daimí Ramírez	08.10.1983	176	67	305	290
8	Yaima Ortiz	09.11.1981	179	70	325	313
10	Yusleinis Herrera	12.03.1984	180	67	312	310
11	Liana Mesa Luaces	26.12.1977	179	70	318	307
12	Rosir Calderón	28.12.1984	191	66	330	325
14	Kenia Carcaces	22.01.1986	188	69	308	306
15	Yusidey Silié	11.11.1984	183	80	316	300
18	Zoila Barros	06.08.1976	188	76	325	312

== Dominican Republic ==
- Head Coach: Beato Miguel Cruz

#	Name	Date of Birth	Height	Weight	Spike	Block
1	Annerys Vargas	07.08.1981	194	70	325	315
2	Rosalín Ángeles	23.07.1985	189	61	310	300
4	Sidarka Núñez	25.06.1984	188	58	312	308
5	Brenda Castillo	05.06.1992	167	55	220	270
6	Carmen Rosa Caso	29.11.1981	168	59	243	241
7	Sofía Mercedes	25.05.1976	185	70	306	298
8	Gina Del Rosario	12.05.1986	189	61	310	300
10	Milagros Cabral	17.10.1978	181	63	308	305
13	Cindy Rondón	12.11.1988	189	61	312	305
15	Cosiri Rodríguez (c)	30.08.1977	191	72	313	305
16	Kenia Moreta	07.04.1981	191	76	310	305
18	Bethania de la Cruz	13.05.1989	188	58	322	305

== Mexico ==
- Head Coach: Macario González

#	Name	Date of Birth	Height	Weight	Spike	Block
2	Migdalel Ruiz (c)
3	Célida Córdova
4	Xitlali Herrera
5	Nancy Ortega
7	Alejandra Acosta
10	Martha Revuelta	06.09.1986	176	77	295	287
12	Claudia Rodríguez
13	Mariana López
14	Zaira Orellana
16	Victoria Castillejas
17	Vanessa Virgen
18	Diana Rubio

== Peru ==
- Head Coach: Enio de Figueiredo

#	Name	Date of Birth	Height	Weight	Spike	Block
1	Sara Joya	22.02.1976	182	70	298	295
2	Mirtha Uribe	12.03.1985	183	67	297	286
3	Verónica Contreras	08.06.1977	175	63	280	282
4	Patricia Soto	10.02.1980	180	67	300	295
5	Vanessa Palacios	03.07.1984	167	66	255	250
6	Jessenia Uceda
7	Yulissa Zamudio	24.03.1976	184	61	320	300
9	Carla Tristán	29.01.1988	182	67	297	295
10	Leyla Chihuán (c)	04.09.1975	180	67	297	306
11	Luren Baylon	14.08.1977	184	68	310	305
13	Zoila Rosa	31.05.1990	174	57	285	280
15	Karla Ortíz

== Puerto Rico ==
- Head Coach: Juan Carlos Núñez

#	Name	Date of Birth	Height	Weight	Spike	Block
1	Deborah Seilhamer	10.04.1985	182	68	280	272
3	Vilmarie Mojica	13.08.1985	177	63	295	274
4	Tatiana Encarnación	28.07.1985	183	72	300	279
5	Sarai Álvarez	03.04.1986	189	61	295	286
6	Michelle Cardona	05.09.1981	172	50	290	259
8	Eva Cruz	22.01.1974	182	72	305	290
9	Áurea Cruz (c)	10.01.1982	182	63	310	290
10	Vanessa Vélez	29.08.1986	186	68	292	280
11	Karina Ocasio	08.01.1985	192	76	298	288
13	Dariam Acevedo	15.12.1984	178	68	297	284
15	Shanon Torregrosa	11.02.1981	182	68	307	287
17	Sheila Ocasio	17.11.1982	192	74	310	292

== United States ==
- Head Coach: Susan Woodstra

#	Name	Date of Birth	Height	Weight	Spike	Block
2	Danielle Scott (c)	01.10.1972	188	84	325	302
3	Tayyiba Haneef	23.03.1979	201	80	318	299
4	Charnette Fair	29.06.1979	180	82	318	308
5	Kristen Michaelis	03.10.1982	180	69	310	306
6	Foluke Akinradewo	05.10.1987
7	Laura Tomes	16.02.1985
10	Cynthia Barboza	07.02.1987	183	68	311	301
12	Kimberly Hampton
13	Maurelle Hampton	11.01.1986	186	71	295	282
15	Courtney Thompson	04.11.1984	170	66	276	263
16	Lindsey Hunter	30.03.1984	178	69
18	Cassie Busse	15.01.1982	190	82	310	298

== See also ==
- 2007 Men's Pan American Games Volleyball Squads
