= 2005 FIVB Volleyball World Grand Prix =

2005 volleyball competition held in Japan

2005 FIVB World Grand Prix
Tournament details
- Host country: Japan (Final)
- Dates: 24 June – 17 July
- Teams: 12
- Venues: 10 (in 10 host cities)

Final positions
- Champions: Brazil (5th title)
- Runners-up: Italy
- Third place: China
- Fourth place: Cuba

Tournament awards
- MVP: (Brazil) Paula Pequeno

The FIVB World Grand Prix 2005 was the thirteenth edition of the annual women's volleyball tournament, which is the female equivalent of the Men's Volleyball World League. The 2005 edition was played by twelve countries from June 24 to July 18, 2005, with the final round held at the Sendai Gymnasium in Sendai, Japan. Hosts Japan and the top five ranked teams after the preliminary rounds qualified for the last round.

The competition of the 2005 WGP lasted four weeks with a total number of 69 matches. During the first, second and third week: 18 matches per team were played with a total of 54 matches. Classification in the preliminary rounds was decided by the number of points gained by teams participating in the same group. The classification in the general ranking of the preliminary rounds of the 2005 WGP was decided by the total number of World Grand Prix Points (GPP) gained by the teams in the preliminary matches.

== Qualification ==
=== Asia ===
- The top four Asian teams according to the FIVB World Rankings
  - China
  - Japan
  - South Korea
  - Thailand

=== Europe ===
- European Qualification Tournament in Ankara, Turkey, from September 21 to September 26, 2004.

Pos	Team	Pld	W	L	Pts	SW	SL	SR	SPW	SPL	SPR	Qualification
1	Netherlands	5	5	0	10	15	2	7.500	420	334	1.257	FIVB Grand Prix 2005
2	Poland	5	3	2	8	11	7	1.571	417	374	1.115	FIVB Grand Prix 2005
3	Germany	5	3	2	8	11	7	1.571	394	387	1.018	FIVB Grand Prix 2005
4	Turkey	5	3	2	8	10	7	1.429	390	344	1.134	
5	Bulgaria	5	1	4	6	3	12	0.250	290	362	0.801	
6	Romania	5	0	5	5	0	15	0.000	265	375	0.707	

- Romania replaced Russia; Italy received a wild card

Date		Score		Set 1	Set 2	Set 3	Set 4	Set 5	Total
21 Sep	Poland	1–3	Netherlands	23–25	25–27	25–21	23–25		96–98
21 Sep	Romania	0–3	Germany	15–25	19–25	19–25			53–75
21 Sep	Bulgaria	0–3	Turkey	18–25	17–25	18–25			53–75
22 Sep	Poland	3–0	Romania	25–18	25–14	25–17			75–49
22 Sep	Germany	3–0	Bulgaria	25–20	25–19	25–17			75–56
22 Sep	Netherlands	3–0	Turkey	25–17	25–18	25–23			75–58
23 Sep	Bulgaria	0–3	Poland	17–25	15–25	18–25			50–75
23 Sep	Romania	0–3	Netherlands	14–25	19–25	16–25			49–75
23 Sep	Turkey	1–3	Germany	25–11	23–25	17–25	23–25		88–86
25 Sep	Romania	0–3	Bulgaria	17–25	23–25	22–25			62–75
25 Sep	Netherlands	3–1	Germany	25–18	25–22	22–25	25–10		97–75
25 Sep	Poland	1–3	Turkey	20–25	17–25	25–19	16–25		78–94
26 Sep	Bulgaria	0–3	Netherlands	23–25	13–25	20–25			56–75
26 Sep	Germany	1–3	Poland	25–18	20–25	15–25	23–25		83–93
26 Sep	Turkey	3–0	Romania	25–16	25–18	25–18			75–52

=== North and South America ===
- Pan-American Cup in Mexicali and Tijuana, Mexico, from June 18 to June 26, 2004.
  - Cuba
  - United States
  - Dominican Republic
  - Brazil

== Preliminary round ==
=== Ranking ===
The host China and top five teams in the preliminary round advance to the final round.

Pos	Team	Pld	W	L	Pts	SW	SL	SR	SPW	SPL	SPR	Qualification
1	China	9	8	1	17	24	4	6.000	689	533	1.293	Final round
2	Brazil	9	8	1	17	24	8	3.000	763	624	1.223	Final round
3	Cuba	9	8	1	17	25	6	4.167	758	678	1.118	Final round
4	Italy	9	6	3	15	19	9	2.111	673	576	1.168	Final round
5	Japan (Note: Qualified as hosts) (H)	9	6	3	15	21	11	1.909	771	665	1.159	Final round
6	Netherlands	9	5	4	14	19	12	1.583	698	627	1.113	Final round
7	Poland	9	5	4	14	15	15	1.000	621	674	0.921	
8	United States	9	4	5	13	16	19	0.842	740	757	0.978	
9	South Korea	9	2	7	11	7	23	0.304	556	708	0.785	
10	Germany	9	1	8	10	7	26	0.269	692	754	0.918	
11	Dominican Republic	9	1	8	10	7	26	0.269	604	777	0.777	
12	Thailand	9	0	9	9	2	27	0.074	519	711	0.730	

(H) Host

=== First round ===
==== Group A ====
- Venue: Tokyo, Japan

Date		Score		Set 1	Set 2	Set 3	Set 4	Set 5	Total	Report
24 Jun	Brazil	3–0	South Korea	25–21	25–20	25–14			75–55	P2
24 Jun	Japan	3–0	Poland	25–16	25–11	25–17			75–44	P2
25 Jun	Brazil	3–0	Poland	25–22	25–10	25–23			75–55	P2
25 Jun	Japan	3–0	South Korea	26–24	25–14	25–18			76–56	P2
26 Jun	South Korea	0–3	Poland	21–25	21–25	18–25			60–75	P2
26 Jun	Japan	2–3	Brazil	25–17	25–17	17–25	21–25	18–20	106–104	P2

==== Group B ====
- Venue: Reggio Calabria, Italy

Date		Score		Set 1	Set 2	Set 3	Set 4	Set 5	Total	Report
24 Jun	Cuba	3–0	Germany	29–27	27–25	27–25			83–77	P2
24 Jun	Italy	3–0	Dominican Republic	25–12	25–12	25–10			75–34	P2
25 Jun	Dominican Republic	0–3	Cuba	26–28	17–25	18–25			61–78	P2
25 Jun	Germany	0–3	Italy	23–25	22–25	23–25			68–75	P2
26 Jun	Dominican Republic	2–3	Germany	12–25	27–25	25–21	9–25	11–15	84–111	P2
26 Jun	Italy	0–3	Cuba	25–27	20–25	28–30			73–82	P2

==== Group C ====
- Venue: Ningbo, China

Date		Score		Set 1	Set 2	Set 3	Set 4	Set 5	Total	Report
24 Jun	United States	0–3	Netherlands	17–25	14–25	17–25			48–75	P2
24 Jun	China	3–0	Thailand	25–20	25–15	25–18			75–53	P2
25 Jun	China	3–1	Netherlands	21–25	25–17	25–22	25–5		96–69	P2
25 Jun	United States	3–0	Thailand	25–13	25–12	25–22			75–47	P2
26 Jun	Netherlands	3–0	Thailand	25–19	25–17	25–14			75–50	P2
26 Jun	China	3–0	United States	25–22	25–15	25–15			75–52	P2

=== Second round ===
==== Group D ====
- Venue: Seoul, South Korea

Date		Score		Set 1	Set 2	Set 3	Set 4	Set 5	Total	Report
1 Jul	South Korea	3–2	United States	25–23	13–25	21–25	25–15	15–13	99–101	P2
1 Jul	Dominican Republic	0–3	Japan	25–27	22–25	17–25			64–77	P2
2 Jul	United States	3–2	Dominican Republic	23–25	23–25	25–14	25–16	15–6	111–86	P2
2 Jul	South Korea	0–3	Japan	22–25	18–25	13–25			53–75	P2
3 Jul	United States	3–1	Japan	25–23	25–21	21–25	29–27		100–96	P2
3 Jul	South Korea	3–0	Dominican Republic	25–21	25–22	25–15			75–58	P2

==== Group E ====
- Venue: Macau

Date		Score		Set 1	Set 2	Set 3	Set 4	Set 5	Total	Report
1 Jul	Brazil	3–0	Poland	25–17	25–13	25–19			75–49	P2
1 Jul	China	3–0	Germany	25–17	25–19	25–15			75–51	P2
2 Jul	Brazil	3–0	Germany	25–16	25–16	26–24			76–56	P2
2 Jul	China	3–0	Poland	25–18	25–13	25–14			75–45	P2
3 Jul	Poland	3–2	Germany	22–25	25–18	26–24	18–25	15–11	106–103	P2
3 Jul	China	3–0	Brazil	25–22	25–21	25–20			75–63	P2

==== Group F ====
- Venue: Pasig, Philippines

Date		Score		Set 1	Set 2	Set 3	Set 4	Set 5	Total	Report
1 Jul	Cuba	3–0	Thailand	25–19	25–17	25–17			75–53	P2
1 Jul	Italy	0–3	Netherlands	18–25	17–25	21–25			56–75	P2
2 Jul	Netherlands	2–3	Cuba	20–25	25–19	25–22	22–25	13–15	105–106	P2
2 Jul	Thailand	0–3	Italy	12–25	10–25	18–25			40–75	P2
3 Jul	Netherlands	3–0	Thailand	25–9	25–16	25–22			75–47	P2
3 Jul	Italy	1–3	Cuba	25–19	24–26	23–25	21–25		93–95	P2

=== Third round ===
==== Group G ====
- Venue: Hong Kong

Date		Score		Set 1	Set 2	Set 3	Set 4	Set 5	Total	Report
8 Jul	Italy	3–0	Germany	25–20	25–23	26–24			76–67	P2
8 Jul	China	3–0	Dominican Republic	25–20	27–25	25–19			77–64	P2
9 Jul	Italy	3–0	Dominican Republic	25–21	25–10	25–18			75–49	P2
9 Jul	China	3–0	Germany	25–23	25–15	25–23			75–61	P2
10 Jul	Germany	2–3	Dominican Republic	25–21	20–25	25–18	21–25	7–15	98–104	P2
10 Jul	China	0–3	Italy	22–25	22–25	22–25			66–75	P2

==== Group H ====
- Venue: Taipei, Taiwan

Date		Score		Set 1	Set 2	Set 3	Set 4	Set 5	Total	Report
8 Jul	South Korea	0–3	Cuba	17–25	19–25	18–25			54–75	P2
8 Jul	Brazil	3–1	Netherlands	25–27	25–19	25–21	25–17		100–84	P2
9 Jul	Netherlands	0–3	Cuba	25–27	19–25	21–25			65–77	P2
9 Jul	Brazil	3–1	South Korea	25–10	23–25	25–12	25–10		98–57	P2
10 Jul	Netherlands	3–0	South Korea	25–12	25–20	25–15			75–47	P2
10 Jul	Cuba	1–3	Brazil	25–22	20–25	19–25	23–25		87–97	P2

==== Group I ====
- Venue: Bangkok, Thailand

Date		Score		Set 1	Set 2	Set 3	Set 4	Set 5	Total	Report
8 Jul	Thailand	1–3	United States	14–25	20–25	25–13	22–25		81–88	P2
8 Jul	Japan	0–3	Poland	22–25	23–25	22–25			67–75	P2
9 Jul	Thailand	0–3	Poland	19–25	23–25	20–25			62–75	P2
9 Jul	Japan	3–1	United States	26–28	25–22	25–15	25–18		101–83	P2
10 Jul	United States	1–3	Poland	18–25	17–25	25–22	22–25		82–97	P2
10 Jul	Japan	3–1	Thailand	23–25	25–22	25–17	25–22		98–86	P2

== Final round ==
- Venue: Sendai Gymnasium, Sendai, Japan

Date		Score		Set 1	Set 2	Set 3	Set 4	Set 5	Total	Report
13 Jul	China	2–3	Cuba	25–10	25–20	19–25	20–25	13–15	102–95	P2
13 Jul	Netherlands	0–3	Brazil	22–25	22–25	14–25			58–75	P2
13 Jul	Italy	3–0	Japan	25–12	25–21	25–14			75–47	P2
14 Jul	China	0–3	Italy	16–25	21–25	22–25			59–75	P2
14 Jul	Cuba	2–3	Brazil	16–25	25–21	25–22	21–25	14–16	101–109	P2
14 Jul	Japan	3–1	Netherlands	22–25	25–20	28–26	25–22		100–93	P2
15 Jul	Italy	3–1	Cuba	25–18	21–25	32–30	25–15		103–88	P2
15 Jul	Netherlands	1–3	China	25–21	22–25	20–25	19–25		86–96	P2
15 Jul	Brazil	3–1	Japan	25–20	25–27	25–20	25–22		100–89	P2
16 Jul	Italy	2–3	Netherlands	26–24	25–18	24–26	21–25	10–15	106–108	P2
16 Jul	China	3–0	Brazil	25–18	25–17	25–19			75–54	P2
16 Jul	Cuba	3–2	Japan	21–25	25–20	20–25	28–26	17–15	111–111	P2
17 Jul	Netherlands	0–3	Cuba	20–25	22–25	20–25			62–75	P2
17 Jul	Brazil	3–2	Italy	25–20	22–25	25–21	27–29	15–7	114–102	P2
17 Jul	Japan	0–3	China	23–25	22–25	23–25			68–75	P2

=== Final ranking ===
Pos	Team	Pld	W	L	Pts	SW	SL	SR	SPW	SPL	SPR
1	Brazil	5	4	1	9	12	8	1.500	452	425	1.064
2	Italy	5	3	2	8	13	7	1.857	461	416	1.108
3	China	5	3	2	8	11	7	1.571	407	378	1.077
4	Cuba	5	3	2	8	12	10	1.200	470	487	0.965
5	Japan	5	1	4	6	6	13	0.462	415	454	0.914
6	Netherlands	5	1	4	6	5	14	0.357	407	452	0.900

== Overall ranking ==
Place	Team
1st place, gold medalist(s)	Brazil
2nd place, silver medalist(s)	Italy
3rd place, bronze medalist(s)	China
4.	Cuba
5.	Japan
6.	Netherlands
7.	Poland
8.	United States
9.	South Korea
10.	Germany
11.	Dominican Republic
12.	Thailand

2005 FIVB Women's World Grand Prix winners

Brazil
Fifth title

Team Roster
Raquel Silva, Sheilla Castro, Paula Pequeno, Caroline Gattaz, Katia Rodrigues, Valeska Menezes, Carolina Albuquerque, Welissa Gonzaga, Marcelle Moraes, Jaqueline Carvalho, Fabiana de Oliveira, Renata Colombo
Head coach
José Roberto Guimarães

== Individual awards ==
- Most valuable player:
  - Paula Pequeno (BRA)
- Best scorer:
  - Miyuki Takahashi (JPN)
- Best spiker:
  - Rosir Calderón (CUB)
- Best blocker:
  - Nancy Carrillo (CUB)
- Best server:
  - Yang Hao (CHN)
- Best digger:
  - Elke Wijnhoven (NED)
- Best setter:
  - Feng Kun (CHN)
- Best receiver:
  - Zhou Suhong (CHN)
- Best libero:
  - Zhang Na (CHN)
