= Wélissa Gonzaga =

Brazilian volleyball player (born 1982)

Welissa Gonzaga
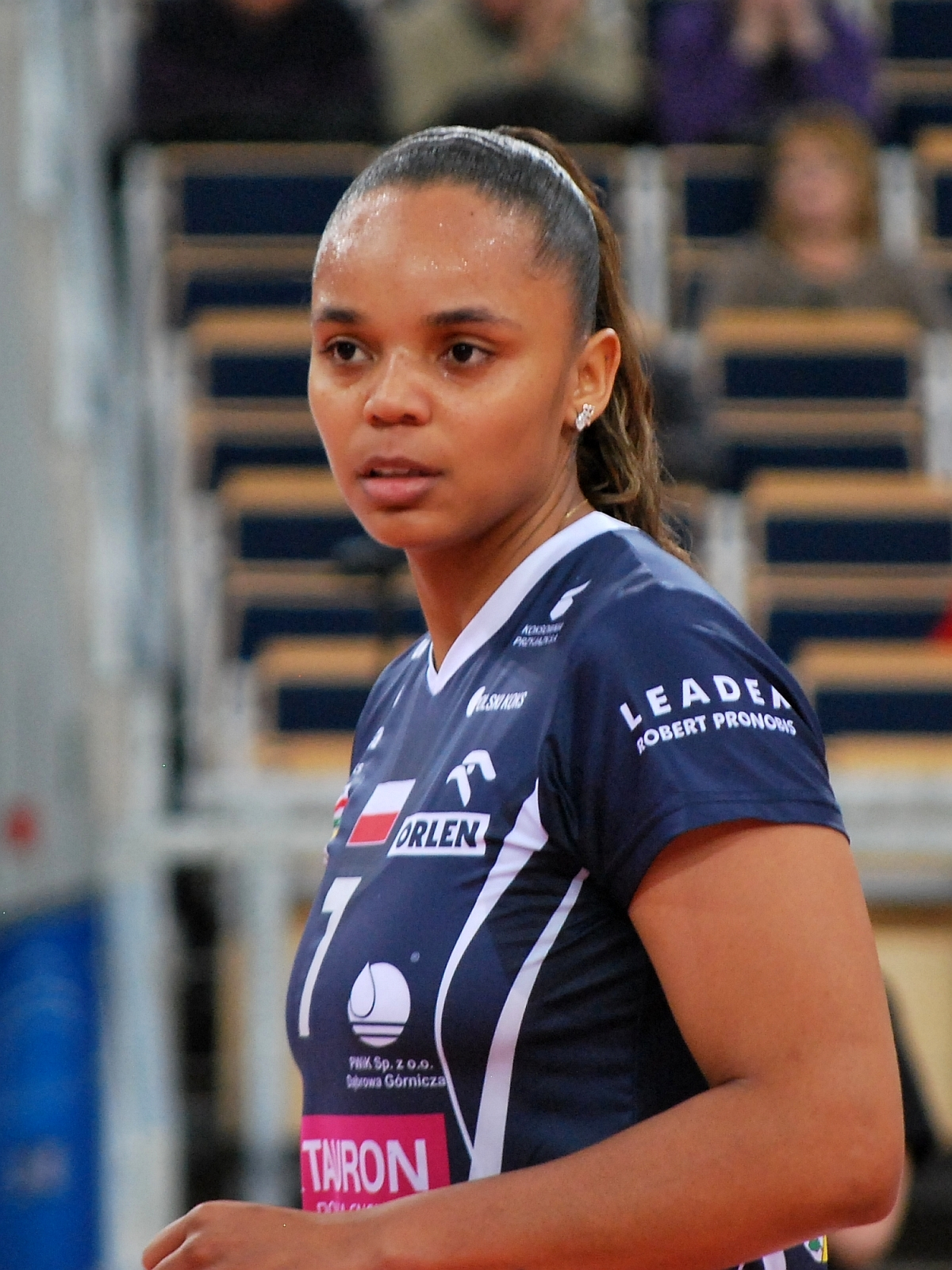
- Sassá in 2014

Personal information
- Full name: Welissa de Souza Gonzaga
- Nickname: Sassá
- Born: 9 September 1982 (age 44) Barbacena, Minas Gerais, Brazil
- Height: 1.79 m (5 ft 10 in)
- Weight: 76 kg (168 lb)
- Spike: 300 cm (118 in)
- Block: 287 cm (113 in)

Volleyball information
- Position: Outside spiker / Libero

National team
- Years: Team
- 2002–2015: Brazil
Honours
Women's volleyball
Representing Brazil
Olympic Games
Gold medal – first place	2008 Beijing	Team
World Championship
Silver medal – second place	2006 Japan	Team
Silver medal – second place	2010 Japan	Team
World Grand Champions Cup
Gold medal – first place	2005 Tokyo/Nagoya	Team
Silver medal – second place	2009 Tokyo/Fukuoka	Team
World Grand Prix
Gold medal – first place	2004 Reggio Calabria	Team
Gold medal – first place	2005 Sendai	Team
Gold medal – first place	2006 Reggio Calabria	Team
Gold medal – first place	2008 Yokohama	Team
Gold medal – first place	2009 Tokyo	Team
Silver medal – second place	2010 Ningbo	Team
Silver medal – second place	2011 Macau	Team
Bronze medal – third place	2015 Omaha	Team
Pan American Games
Silver medal – second place	2007 Rio de Janeiro	Team
Pan-American Cup
Gold medal – first place	2009 Miami	Team
Final Four Cup
Gold medal – first place	2008 Fortaleza	Team
Gold medal – first place	2009 Lima	Team
South American Championship
Gold medal – first place	2011 Callao	Team

Wélissa de Souza Gonzaga, (born 9 September 1982), best known as Sassá, is a Brazilian volleyball player. With the national team, she won the gold medal at the 2008 Olympic Games in Beijing.

== Clubs ==
- (Brazil) Vasco da Gama (2000–2001)
- (Brazil) Rexona-Ades (2001–2008)
- (Brazil) Finasa/Osasco (2008–2009)
- (Brazil) Sollys/Osasco (2009–2011)
- (Brazil) SESI-SP (2011–2013)
- (Poland) MKS Dąbrowa Górnicza (2013–2014)
- (Brazil) Praia Clube Uberlândia (2014–2015)
- (Brazil) Brasília Vôlei (2015–2016)
- (Brazil) Fluminense FC (2016–2019)
- (Brazil) Itajaí Vôlei (2020)
- (Brazil) Curitiba Vôlei (2020–2021)
- (Brazil) Moda Brusque (2021–2023)
- (United States) Athletes Unlimited Volleyball (2023)
- (Brazil) Mackenzie Esporte Clube (2023–)

== Awards ==
=== Individuals ===
- 2004–05 Salonpas Cup – "Most Valuable Player"
- 2004–05 Salonpas Cup – "Best Server"
- 2004–05 Salonpas Cup – "Best Receiver"
- 2005 South American Championship – "Best Receiver"
- 2005 FIVB World Grand Champions Cup – "Best Server"
- 2005–06 Brazilian Superliga – "Best Receiver"
- 2006–07 Brazilian Superliga – "Best Server"
- 2009 South American Club Championship – "Best Receiver"
- 2010 South American Club Championship – "Best Server"
- 2011–12 Brazilian Superliga – "Best Digger"
