= Virna Dias =

Brazilian volleyball player

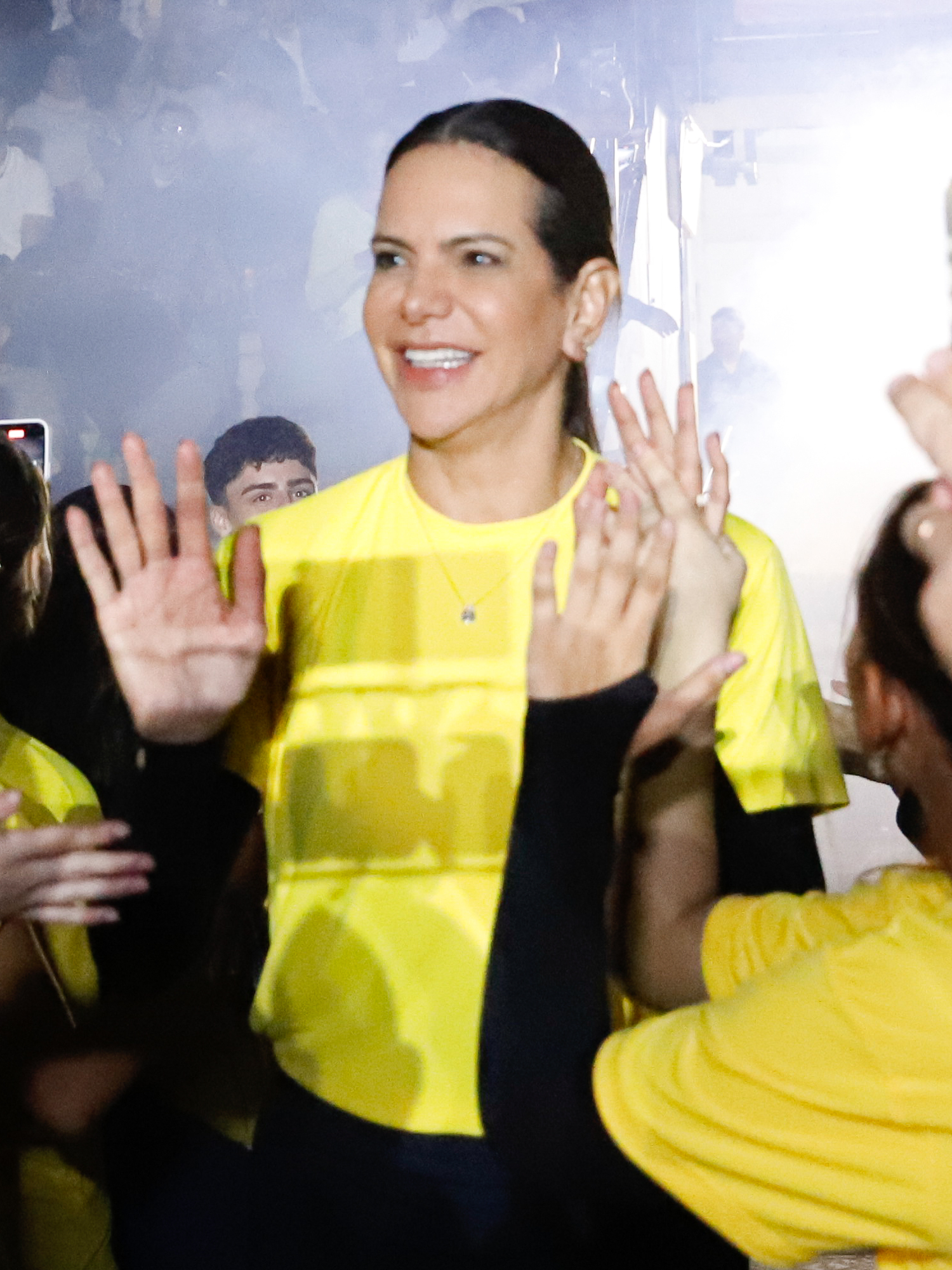

Personal information
- Full name: Virna Cristine Dantas Dias
- Born: 31 August 1971 (age 55) Natal, Rio Grande do Norte, Brazil
- Height: 1.84 m (6 ft 0 in)
- Weight: 70 kg (150 lb)
- Spike: 306 cm (120 in)
- Block: 294 cm (116 in)

Volleyball information
- Position: Outside hitter
- Current club: Retired
- Number: 10

National team
- Years: Team
- 1991–2004: Brazil
Honours
Women's volleyball
Representing Brazil
Olympic Games
Bronze medal – third place	1996 Atlanta	Team
Bronze medal – third place	2000 Sidney	Team
World Championship
Silver medal – second place	1994 Brazil	Team
World Cup
Silver medal – second place	1995 Japan	Team
Silver medal – second place	2003 Japan	Team
Bronze medal – third place	1999 Japan	Team
World Grand Prix
Gold medal – first place	1994 Xangai	Team
Gold medal – first place	1996 Xangai	Team
Gold medal – first place	1998 Hong Kong	Team
Gold medal – first place	2004 Reggio Calabria	Team
Silver medal – second place	1995 Xangai	Team
Silver medal – second place	1999 Yu Xi	Team
Bronze medal – third place	2000 Manila	Team
World Grand Champions Cup
Bronze medal – third place	1997 Japan	Team
Pan American Games
Gold medal – first place	1999 Winnipeg	Team
CSV South American Championship
Gold medal – first place	1995 Porto Alegre
Gold medal – first place	1997 Lima
Gold medal – first place	1999 Valencia
Gold medal – first place	2003 Bogotá
Silver medal – second place	1993 Cusco

Virna Cristine Dantes Dias (born 31 August 1971) is a Brazilian retired volleyball player. She represented Brazil at the 1996 Summer Olympics in Atlanta. There, she claimed the bronze medal with the Women's National Team.

Dias also competed at the 1999 FIVB World Cup in Japan, the 2000 Summer Olympics in Sydney, winning the bronze once again, and the 2004 Summer Olympics in Athens.

== Clubs ==
- (Brazil) Lufkin (1986–1990)
- (Italy) Virtus Reggio Calabria (1991–1992)
- (Brazil) Ribeirão Preto (1992–1993)
- (Brazil) BCN Guarujá (1993–1994)
- (Brazil) Minas Tênis Clube (1994–1995)
- (Brazil) Tietê (1995–1996)
- (Brazil) Minas Tênis Clube (1996–1997)
- (Brazil) União (1997–1998)
- (Brazil) Uniban (1998–1999)
- (Brazil) Flamengo (1999–2001)
- (Brazil) BCN Osasco (2001–2003)
- (Brazil) Minas Tênis Clube (2003–2004)
- (Italy) Chieri Torino (2004–2005)
- (Brazil) Rio de Janeiro (2008–2009)

== Awards ==
=== Individuals ===
- 1994–95 Brazilian Superliga – "Best Server"
- 1995–96 Brazilian Superliga – "Best Server"
- 1997 South American Championship – "Best Spiker"
- 1998–99 Brazilian Superliga – "Most Valuable Player"
- 1998–99 Brazilian Superliga – "Best Spiker"
- 1999 FIVB World Grand Prix – "Most Valuable Player"
- 1999 FIVB World Grand Prix – "Best Scorer"
- 1999 FIVB World Grand Prix – "Best Receiver"
- 2000–01 Brazilian Superliga – "Most Valuable Player"
- 2001 FIVB World Grand Champions Cup – "Best Receiver"
- 2004–05 CEV Cup – "Best Receiver"

Awards
Preceded by (Brazil) Leila Barros	Most Valuable Player of FIVB World Grand Prix; 1999	Succeeded by (Russia) Lyubov Sokolova
