= Ana Esther Lara =

Dominican volleyball player

Personal information
- Nationality: Dominican
- Born: 8 June 1985 (age 41)
- Height: 172 cm (5 ft 8 in)
- Weight: 70 kg (154 lb)
- Spike: 279 cm (110 in)
- Block: 274 cm (108 in)
- Education: O&M

Volleyball information
- Position: Libero

National team
| 2006 | Dominican Republic |
Honours
Women's volleyball
Representing the Dominican Republic

Ana Esther Lara (born 8 June 1985) is a retired Dominican Republic female volleyball player. She was part of the Dominican Republic women's national volleyball team. She participated in the 2006 FIVB Volleyball World Grand Prix.

On club level she played for Modeca in 2006.

== Career ==
Lara was awarded Best Receiver in the 2004 National District Superior Tournament that she played with the club Bameso.

In the 2004 Junior NORCECA Championship held in Winnipeg Canada, she won the silver medal and the Best Libero award. Lara was viewed as the future for the Libero position for the Dominican Republic at the time she was participating in the warm up matches against a Chinese team. She represented her home country at the 2005 FIVB U20 World Championship, and her team finished ninth when their goal was reaching the fifth position. She played this tournament that was meant for players born after 1986.

During the 2005 Superior National tournament, Lara played with the Santo Domingo representative and was awarded tournament's Best Digger. She won the Best Libero individual award in the 2006 FIVB qualification championship,

For the 2005/06 season, she played with the German club USC Braunschweig, ranking in the seventh place in the Bundesliga. When the Dominican coach Beato Cruz took over the reins of the senior national teams, he was set to visit the Dominican players participating overseas, among them Lara and named her between the 18 players set to fight for a spot in the 2006 national team calendar.

Lara was set to participate in 2007 with her original club, Modeca, but after serious disagreements Lara's club president and the NORCECA president Cristóbal Marte, she and other player were expelled from the national team indefinitely. Later she was named in the case file open in the International Olympic Committee's Ethics Commission by Professor Hans Peter Graf, accusing FIVB president Mr. Ruben Acosta and the vice president Cristóbal Marte of violation of the IOC ethical rules and cheating about ages, among them, Lara's age for the 2005 FIVB U20 World Championship.

She turned to beach volleyball, partnering Juana González in the Cochabamba, Bolivia stop from the World Volleyball Federation (WVBF) Proseries Championship Tour 2008 were they ranked tied in seventh place from eight participants.

Lara played for Universidad Nacional Pedro Henríquez Ureña in the 2008 National University Games in the Dominican Republic.

In 2017 she won the gold medal in the Hato Mayor Beach Volleyball Tournament, playing with Dahiana Burgos and Juana González.

In 2019 The libero Ana Lara was chosen by Cristo Rey and there they would have the opportunity to play in this campaign in the absence of Brenda Castillo, where his team was in the first place, he suffered an injury in the right knee that affected his meniscus, this happened and he had to leave the competition, carry out the recovery process under therapies, his participation was impeccable, she not I had played at that level since 2006

== Clubs ==
- (Dominican Republic) Simón Bolívar (1996–1998)
- (Dominican Republic) Modeca (1999–2002)
- (Dominican Republic) Evocar (2003–2004)
- (Dominican Republic) Bameso (2004)
- (Germany) USC Braunschweig (2005–2006)
- (Dominican Republic) Modeca (2006–2007)
- (Dominican Republic) Evocar (2007)
- (Dominican Republic) Cristo Rey (2019)
