= 1999 FIVB Volleyball World Grand Prix =

International women's volleyball tournament

1999 FIVB World Grand Prix
Tournament details
- Host country: China (Group 1 Final)
- Dates: 27–29 August
- Teams: 8
- Venue: 1 (in 1 host city)

Final positions
- Champions: Russia (2nd title)

Tournament awards
- MVP: (Brazil) Virna Dias

The 1999 FIVB World Grand Prix was the seventh women's volleyball tournament of its kind. It was held over three weeks in four cities throughout Asia, cumulating with the final round in Yu Xi, PR China, from 27 to 29 August 1999.

== Preliminary rounds ==
=== Ranking ===
The best four teams from the overall ranking are qualified for the final round.

Pos	Team	Pld	W	L	Pts	SW	SL	SR	SPW	SPL	SPR	Qualification
1	Brazil	6	6	0	12	18	5	3.600	563	485	1.161	Final round
2	Russia	6	6	0	12	18	8	2.250	585	493	1.187	Final round
3	China	6	3	3	9	11	12	0.917	539	546	0.987	Final round
4	Italy	6	3	3	9	11	12	0.917	524	540	0.970	Final round
5	Cuba	6	2	4	8	13	13	1.000	568	570	0.996	
6	South Korea	6	2	4	8	12	15	0.800	548	568	0.965	
7	Japan	6	1	5	7	9	17	0.529	532	579	0.919	
8	Netherlands	6	1	5	7	7	17	0.412	493	571	0.863	

=== First round ===
==== Group A ====
- Venue: Macau

Date		Score		Set 1	Set 2	Set 3	Set 4	Set 5	Total
13 Ago	Brazil	3–0	Italy	25–20	25–17	25–20			75–57
13 Ago	China	3–1	Netherlands	29–31	25–23	25–15	25–23		104–92
14 Ago	Brazil	3–0	Netherlands	25–18	25–20	25–18			75–56
14 Ago	China	0–3	Italy	27–29	24–26	25–27			76–82
15 Ago	Italy	3–1	Netherlands	25–20	26–24	22–25	25–21		98–90
15 Ago	China	1–3	Brazil	25–20	22–25	29–31	16–25		92–101

==== Group B ====
- Venue: Genting, Malaysia

Date		Score		Set 1	Set 2	Set 3	Set 4	Set 5	Total
13 Ago	South Korea	2–3	Russia	25–20	25–18	14–25	21–25	12–15	97–103
13 Ago	Cuba	2–3	Japan	26–24	21–25	17–25	25–14	13–15	102–103
14 Ago	Cuba	2–3	South Korea	20–25	16–25	25–15	25–20	13–15	99–100
14 Ago	Russia	3–0	Japan	25–16	15–13	25–17			75–46
15 Ago	South Korea	3–1	Japan	25–17	25–16	17–25	25–23		92–81
15 Ago	Russia	3–2	Cuba	23–25	22–25	25–19	25–22	15–13	110–104

=== Second round ===
==== Group C ====
- Venue: Kaohsiung, Taiwan

Date		Score		Set 1	Set 2	Set 3	Set 4	Set 5	Total
20 Ago	Russia	3–2	Japan	25–17	21–25	25–19	19–25	15–13	105–99
20 Ago	China	3–1	Netherlands	25–20	25–14	16–25	25–20		91–79
21 Ago	Russia	3–1	Netherlands	19–25	25–17	25–10	25–20		94–72
21 Ago	China	3–1	Japan	25–23	25–18	21–25	30–28		101–94
22 Ago	Japan	2–3	Netherlands	25–27	25–14	22–25	25–23	12–15	109–104
22 Ago	China	1–3	Russia	18–25	16–25	25–23	16–25		75–98

==== Group D ====
- Venue: Manila, Philippines

Date		Score		Set 1	Set 2	Set 3	Set 4	Set 5	Total
20 Ago	Cuba	3–0	South Korea	25–21	25–19	25–22			75–62
20 Ago	Brazil	3–1	Italy	25–22	27–29	25–23	25–18		102–92
21 Ago	Italy	1–3	Cuba	21–25	25–22	23–25	25–27		94–99
21 Ago	Brazil	3–2	South Korea	25–27	25–20	25–20	19–25	15–7	109–99
22 Ago	Italy	3–2	South Korea	13–25	22–25	26–24	25–14	15–10	101–98
22 Ago	Cuba	1–3	Brazil	28–26	17–25	21–25	23–25		89–101

== Final round ==
- Venue: Yuxi, China

=== Final four ===
Semifinals
27 August
Brazil	3
Italy	1
27 August
China	1
Russia	3

Final
28 August
Brazil	0
Russia	3
3rd place match
28 August
Italy	1
China	3

==== Semifinals ====
Date		Score		Set 1	Set 2	Set 3	Set 4	Set 5	Total
27 Ago	Brazil	3–1	Italy	28–26	25–19	23–25	26–24		102–94
27 Ago	China	1–3	Russia	16–25	25–16	24–26	22–25		87–92

==== 3rd place match ====
Date		Score		Set 1	Set 2	Set 3	Set 4	Set 5	Total
28 Ago	Italy	1–3	China	25–19	20–25	23–25	21–25		89–94

==== Final ====
Date		Score		Set 1	Set 2	Set 3	Set 4	Set 5	Total
28 Ago	Brazil	0–3	Russia	23–25	22–25	20–25			65–75

== Final ranking ==
Place	Team
1st place, gold medalist(s)	Russia
2nd place, silver medalist(s)	Brazil
3rd place, bronze medalist(s)	China
4	Italy
5	Cuba
6	South Korea
7	Japan
8	Netherlands

1999 FIVB World Grand Prix winners

Russia
Second title

Team roster
Irina Tebenikhina, Natalia Morozova, Anastasia Belikova, Lyubov Sokolova, Elena Godina, Natalia Safronova, Yevgeniya Artamonova, Yelizaveta Tishchenko, Yelena Vasilevskaya, Ekaterina Gamova, Yelena Plotnikova and Elena Sennikova.
Head coach
Nikolay Karpol

== Individual awards ==
- Most valuable player:
  - Virna Dias (BRA)
- Best scorer:
  - Virna Dias (BRA)
- Best spiker:
  - Evguenia Artamonova (RUS)
- Best blocker:
  - Elena Godina (RUS)
- Best server:
  - Lioubov Sokolova (RUS)
- Best digger:
  - Ricarda Lima (BRA)
- Best setter:
  - Helia Souza (BRA)
- Best receiver:
  - Virna Dias (BRA)

== Statistics leaders ==
- Only players whose teams advanced to the final four are ranked.

Best scorers

Rank	Name	Points
1	(Brazil) Virna Dias	117
2	(Russia) Evguenia Artamonova	114
3	(Cuba) Yumilka Ruiz	105
4	(Brazil) Ana Moser	101
5	(Italy) Francesca Piccinini	97

Best spikers

Rank	Name	%Eff
1	(Russia) Evguenia Artamonova	44.87
2	(Italy) Elisa Togut	38.65
3	(Brazil) Leila Barros	36.19
4	(Italy) Francesca Piccinini	34.14
5	(Cuba) Regla Bell	33.88

Best blockers

Rank	Name	Avg
1	(Russia) Yelena Godina	1.15
2	(Italy) Eleonora Lo Bianco	1.02
3	(Cuba) Ana Ibis Fernandez	0.98
4	(Russia) Elizaveta Tichtenko	0.93
5	(Brazil) Janina Conceicao	0.87

Best servers

Rank	Name	Avg
1	(Russia) Liuobov Sokolova	0.50
2	(Brazil) Ana Moser	0.47
3	(Russia) Yelena Godina	0.45
4	(Cuba) Regla Bell	0.39
5	(Italy) Elisa Togut	0.36

Best setters

Rank	Name	Avg	%Succ
1	(Brazil) Helia Souza	10.54	47.67
2	(Cuba) Taismary Aguero	9.92	43.65
3	(Italy) Maurizia Cacciatori	8.85	442.34
4	(Russia) Elena Vassilevskaia	5.76	41.18
5	(Cuba) Marlenis Costa	5.73	40.55
