= Yelena Godina =

Russian volleyball player (born 1977)

Personal information
- Born: 17 September 1977 (age 49); Sverdlovsk, Russian SFSR, Soviet Union
- Height: 1.96 m (6 ft 5 in)
- Weight: 72 kg (159 lb)
- Spike: 3.17 m (10 ft 5 in)
- Block: 3.10 m (10 ft 2 in)

Volleyball information
- Position: Outside hitter
- Number: 6

Career
Years	Teams
1991–1997; 1997–1998; 1998–1999; 1999–2001; 2001–2002; 2003–2004; 2004–2005; 2005–2006; 2006–2011	Uralochka Ekaterinburgo; ŽOK Dubrovnik; NEC Red Rockets; Uralochka Ekaterinburgo; Eczacıbaşı Istanbul; CV Tenerife; Dynamo Moscow; Chieri; Dynamo Moscow

National team
1995–2008	Russia
Honours
Women's volleyball
Representing Russia
Olympic Games
Silver medal – second place	2000 Sydney	Team
World Championship
Gold medal – first place	2006 Japan	Team
Bronze medal – third place	1998 Japan	Team
Bronze medal – third place	2002 Germany	Team
FIVB World Cup
Silver medal – second place	1999 Japan	Team
World Grand Champions Cup
Gold medal – first place	1997 Japan
Silver medal – second place	2001 Japan	Team
FIVB World Grand Prix
Gold medal – first place	1997 Kobe
Gold medal – first place	1999 Yu Xi
Gold medal – first place	2002 Hong Kong
Silver medal – second place	1998 Hong Kong
Silver medal – second place	2000 Manila
Silver medal – second place	2006 Reggio Calabria
Bronze medal – third place	1996 Shangai
Bronze medal – third place	2001 Macau
European Championship
Gold medal – first place	1997 Czech Republic
Gold medal – first place	1999 Italy
Gold medal – first place	2001 Bulgaria
Bronze medal – third place	1995 Netherlands
Bronze medal – third place	2005 Croatia
Bronze medal – third place	2007 Belgium/Luxembourg
World U20 Championship
Bronze medal – third place	1995 Thailand	Under-20
European Junior Championship
Gold medal – first place	1994 Hungary	Under-19

Yelena Mikhailovna Godina (Russian: Елена Михайловна Година; born 17 September 1977) is a Russian former volleyball player, who was a member of the national team that won the gold medal at 2006 Volleyball World Championship in Japan and the silver medal at the 2000 Summer Olympics in Sydney. She also competed at the 1996 Summer Olympics in Atlanta and the 2008 Summer Olympics in Beijing.

== Honours ==
- 1998 World Championship – 3rd place
- 1999 World Cup – 2nd place
- 2000 Olympic Games – 2nd place
- 2002 World Championship – 3rd place
- 2006 World Championship – 1st place
- 2008 Olympic Games – 6th place

== Individual awards ==
- 1999 FIVB World Grand Prix "Best blocker"
- 2006 World Championship "Best server"

Awards
Preceded by (Brazil) Ana Paula Connelly	Best Blocker of FIVB World Grand Prix; 1999	Succeeded by (Russia) Yekaterina Gamova
Preceded by (Cuba) Nancy Carrillo	2006 FIVB World Championship's; Women's Best Server; 2006	Succeeded by (Netherlands) Maret Grothues
