= Shuka Oyama =

Japanese volleyball player

Personal information
- Full name: Shuka Oyama
- Nickname: Wang Joe
- Born: September 25, 1980 (age 46); Fushun, Liaoning, China
- Height: 1.82 m (6 ft 0 in)
- Weight: 65 kg (143 lb)
- Spike: 315 cm (124 in)
- Block: 303 cm (119 in)

Volleyball information
- Position: Wing Spiker
- Current club: Hisamitsu Springs
- Number: 5

National team
Japan

Shuka Oyama (小山修加 Oyama Shuka, born September 25, 1980) is a Japanese volleyball player who plays for Hisamitsu Springs.

== Profiles ==
- She was born in Fushun, Liaoning.
- Chinese name is Wang Jiao.
- She was a High Jump player in China.
- She came to Japan for the nursing of her grandmother in 1996.
- She was naturalized in Japan in 2002.

== Clubs ==
- Sumanourajoshi High School → Hisamitsu Springs (2001-)

== National team ==
- Japan 2006-2007

== Honours ==
- 2006 - 6th place in the FIVB Volleyball Women's World Championship in Japan
