= Kamila Frątczak =

Female volleyball player

Personal information
- Nationality: Polish
- Born: 25 November 1979 (age 46)

Volleyball information
- Number: 11

National team
1999–2010	Poland
Honours
Representing Poland
European Championship
Gold medal – first place	2003 Turkey

Kamila Frątczak (born 25 November 1979) is a Polish volleyball player, a member of Poland women's national volleyball team.

She competed at the 2001 Women’s European Volleyball Championship, and 2003 Women’s European Volleyball Championship, winning a gold medal.

== Clubs ==
- MKS MOS Turek 1995/96
- Augusto Kalisz — 1996/97–1998/1999
- Calisia Kalisz — 1999/2000–2001/2002
- Winiary Kalisz — 2002/2003–2003/2004
- Modena Volley — 2004/2005
- Priamidea. Com Tortoli — 2005/2006
- Europea 92 Isernia — 2006/2007
- Muszynianka Fakro Muszyna — 2007/2008
- Muszynianka Fakro Muszyna — 2008/2009
