= Yulia Merkulova =

Russian volleyball player (born 1984)

Iuliia Merkulova
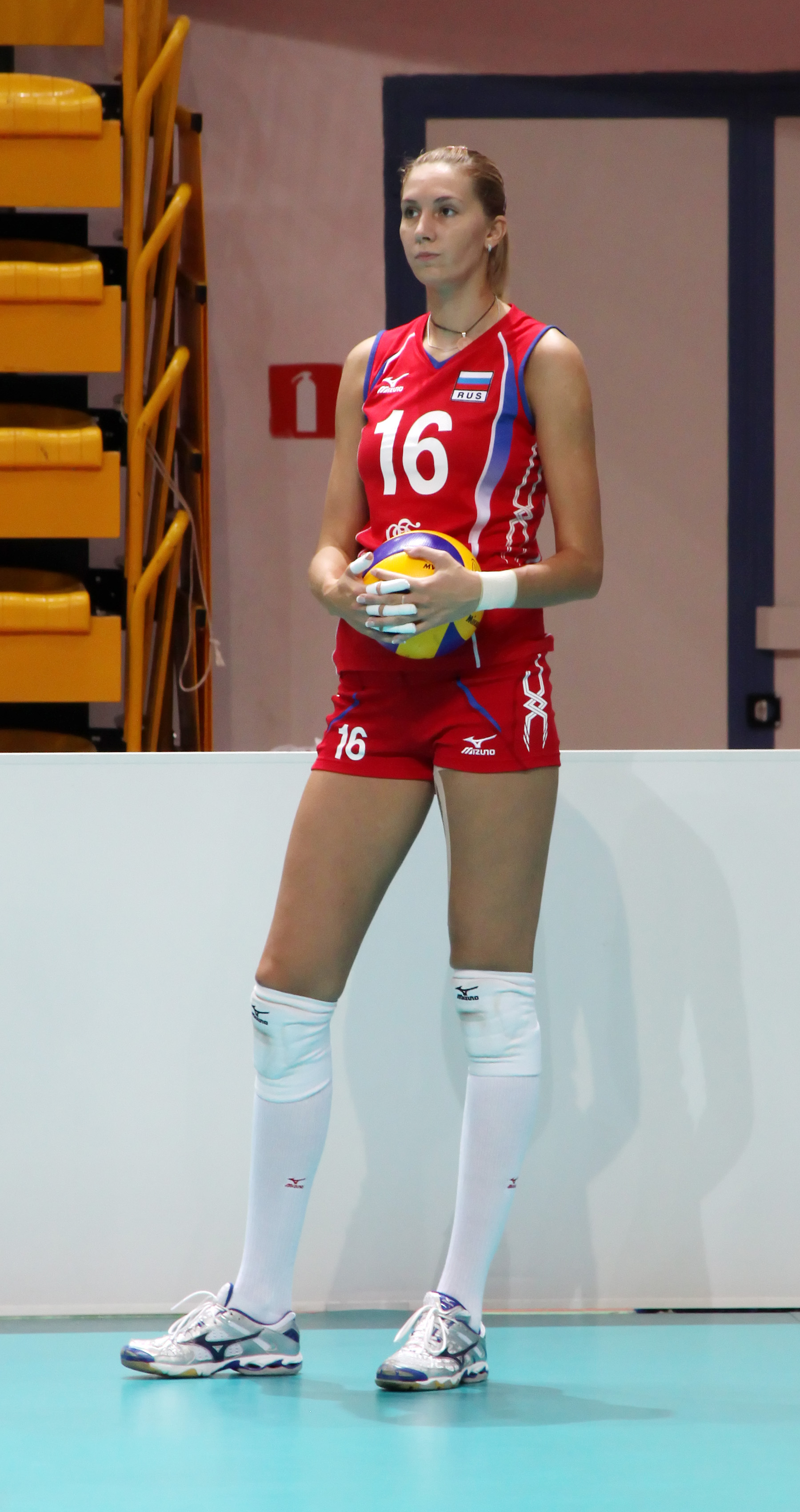

Personal information
- Nationality: Russian
- Born: 17 February 1984 (age 42)
- Height: 202 cm (6 ft 8 in)
- Weight: 75 kg (165 lb)
- Spike: 317 cm (125 in)
- Block: 308 cm (121 in)

Volleyball information
- Number: 16 (national team)

Career
- Years: Team
- 1999—2000 2000—2009 2009—2010 2010—2012 2012—2013 2013—2015: (Russia) Lipetsk-2 (Russia) Zarechye Odintsovo (Russia) Dinamo Krasnodar (Russia) Dynamo Moscow (Russia) Dinamo Krasnodar (Russia) Zarechye Odintsovo

National team
- Years: Team
- 2005 - 2012: Russia
Honours
Women's volleyball
Representing Russia
World Championship
Gold medal – first place	2006 Japan	Team
Gold medal – first place	2010 Japan	Team
FIVB World Grand Prix
Silver medal – second place	2006 Reggio Calabria	Team
European Championship
Bronze medal – third place	2005 Zagreb-Pula	Team
Bronze medal – third place	2007 Charleroi-Luxembourg	Team competition

Yulia Merkulova (Russian: Юлия Меркулова) (born 17 February 1984) is a Russian volleyball player, who was born in Lipetsk. Standing at 202 cm, she plays as a middle blocker. She was part of the Russia women's national volleyball team at the 2006 FIVB Volleyball Women's World Championship in Japan. At club level, she plays for Dinamo Krasnodar.

== Awards ==
=== Club ===
- 2012–13 CEV Women's Challenge Cup - Champion, with Dinamo Krasnodar

== See also ==
- List of tall women
