= Svetlana Valentinovna Kryuchkova =

Russian volleyball player (born 1985)

Svetlana Kryuchkova
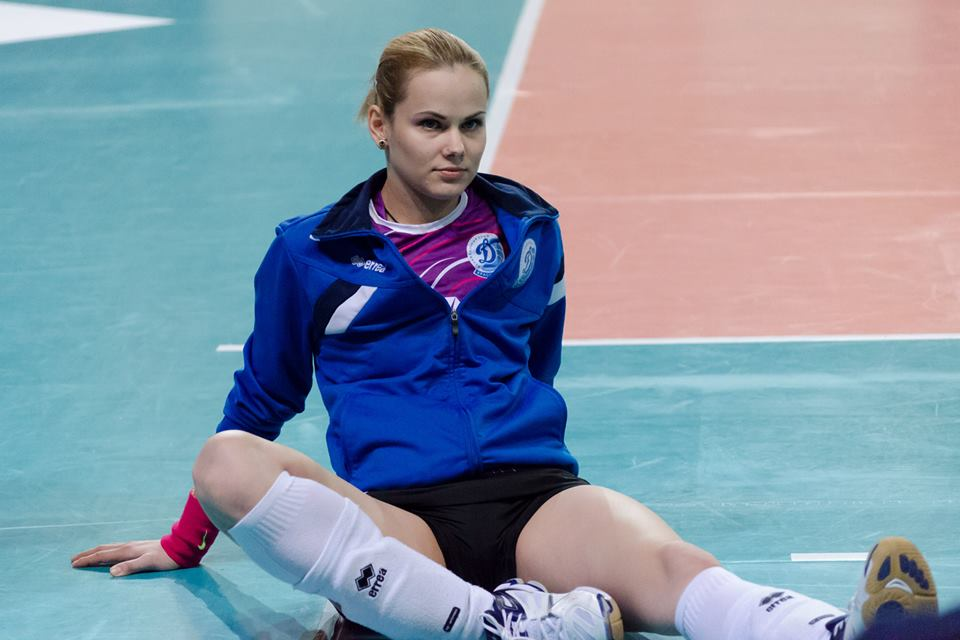

Personal information
- Full name: Svetlana Valentinovna Kryuchkova
- Nationality: Russian
- Born: 21 February 1985 (age 41); Lipetsk, Russia
- Height: 1.74 m (5 ft 9 in)
- Weight: 63 kg (139 lb)
- Spike: 290 cm (114 in)
- Block: 284 cm (112 in)

Volleyball information
- Position: Libero
- Current club: VC Yenisey Krasnoyarsk
- Number: 7

Career
Years	Teams
	WFC Dinamo Moscow; VC Yenisey Krasnoyarsk

National team
2005 – 2017	Russia
Honours
Women's volleyball
Representing Russia
European Championship
Gold medal – first place	2013 Germany

Svetlana Valentinovna Kryuchkova (Russian: Светлана Валентиновна Крючкова) (born 21 February 1985) is a Russian volleyball player. At the 2012 Summer Olympics, she competed for the Russia women's national volleyball team in the women's event.

== Awards ==
=== Club ===
- 2012–13 CEV Women's Challenge Cup – Champion, with Dinamo Krasnodar
