= Marina Akulova =

Russian volleyball player (born 1985)

Personal information
- Born: 13 December 1985 (age 40) Chelyabinsk
Medal record
Women's volleyball
Representing Russia
World Championship
Gold medal – first place	2006 Japan	Team competition
European Championship
Bronze medal – third place	2007 Charleroi-Luxembourg	Team competition

Marina Sergeyevna Akulova (Russian: Марина Акулова) (born 13 December 1985 in Chelyabinsk) is a volleyball player from Russia, playing as a setter. She was a member of the Women's National Team that won the gold medal at the 2006 FIVB Women's World Championship.

== Clubs ==
- (Russia) Avtodor-Metar (2001-2004)
- (Russia) Samorodok Khabarovsk (2004-2008)
- (Russia) Omichka Omsk (2008-2012)
