= Maria Bruntseva =

Russian volleyball player (born 1980)

Medal record

Women's volleyball

Representing Russia

World Championship
| Gold medal – first place | 2006 Japan | Team competition |

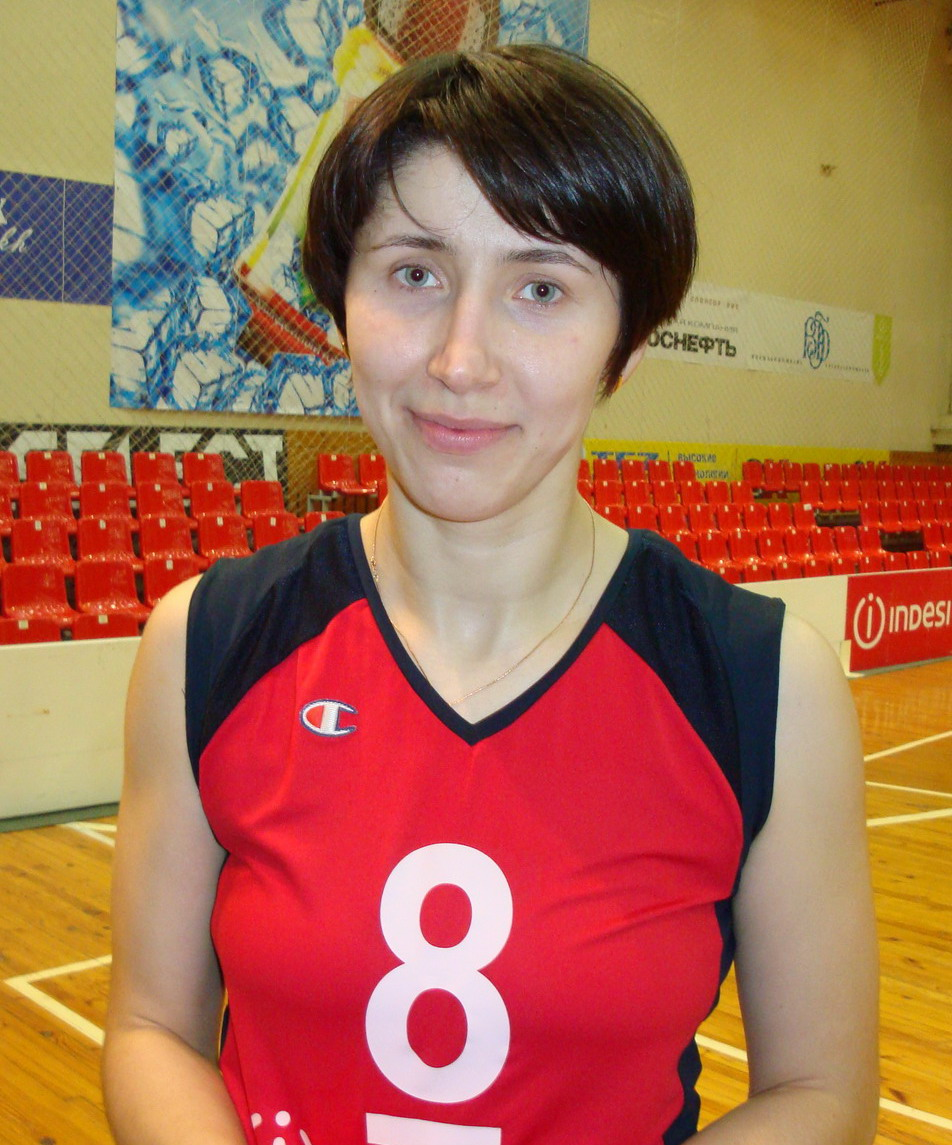
in 2009

Maria Bruntseva (born 12 June 1980) is a volleyball player from Russia, who played in several positions. She was a member of the Women's National Team that won the gold medal at the 2006 FIVB Women's World Championship.
