= Therese Crawford =

American volleyball player

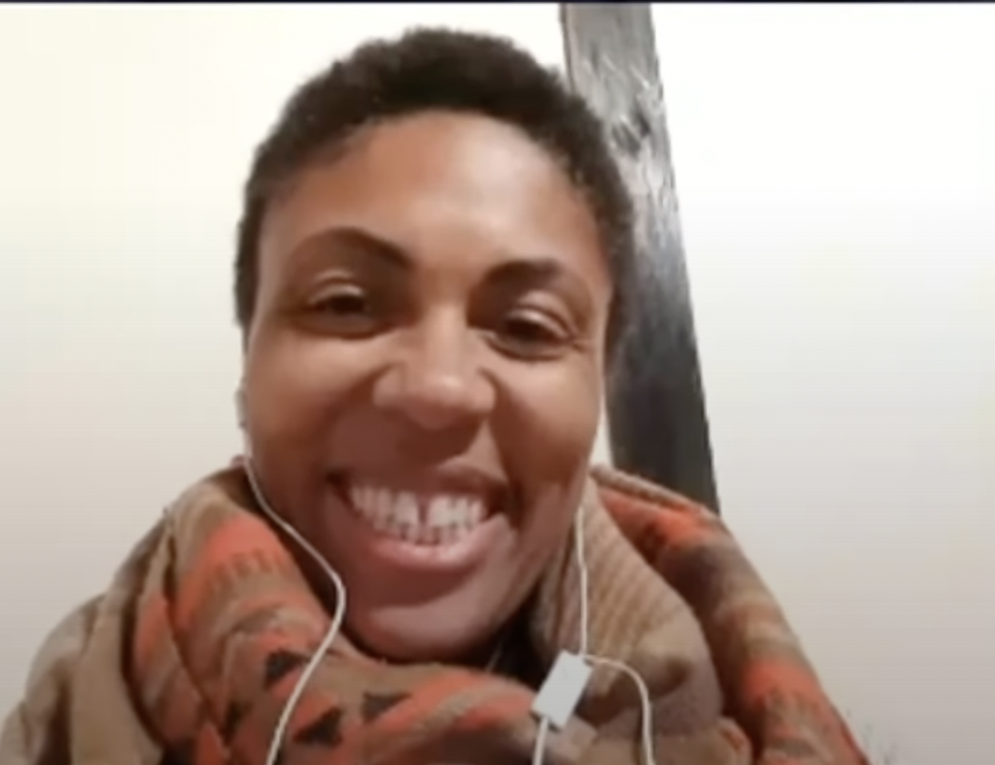
- Crawford in 2019

Personal information
- Nationality: American
- Born: August 6, 1976 (age 50); Kalamazoo, Michigan, U.S.
- Height: 5 ft 9 in (176 cm)
Medal record
Women's volleyball
Representing the United States
Pan American Games
Bronze medal – third place	2003 Santo Domingo	Team

Therese Crawford (born August 6, 1976) is a retired American volleyball player. She played as an outside hitter and was a member of the United States women's national volleyball team.

== Major international competition ==
- 2006 – World Grand Prix (Seventh Place). World Championships (Ninth Place).
- 2005 – FIVB World Championship Qualifying Tournament (Gold Medal). NORCECA Continental Championships (Gold Medal). World Grand Champions Cup.
- 2003 – Pan American Cup (Gold Medal). Pan American Games (Bronze Medal).
- 2002 – Montreux Volley Masters. Russia Tournament.
- 2001 – World Grand Prix (Gold Medal). NORCECA Zone Championships (Gold Medal). World Grand Champions Cup.

== International highlights ==
- 2006 – Started all nine matches of the World Grand Prix averaging 1.94 points per set. Tallied 13 points versus Dominican Republic on August 16 and 12 points against Korea on September 2 in World Grand Prix action. Notched 18 points in 14 sets for the U.S. during World Championship competition. Turned in seven points against Kazakhstan on October 31.
- 2005 – Selected as a member of the USA Women’s National Volleyball Team that captured the silver medal at the season-ending FIVB World Grand Champions Cup in Japan in November. The United States finished the tournament with a record of 4-1 as it earned wins over Korea, 2004 Olympic gold medalist China, Poland and Japan along the way. Earned a gold medal as Team USA won its third-straight NORCECA Continental Championship with a five-set victory over Cuba on September 11. The USA Women qualified for the FIVB World Grand Champions Cup with the win…Also earned a gold medal in August at the FIVB World Championship Qualifying Tournament as the USA Women qualified for the 2006 World Championships.
- 2003 – Saw limited action with Team USA while playing in two competitions during the year. Earned a gold medal at the Pan American Cup and a bronze medal at the Pan American Games.
- 2002 – Played in the first two tournaments of the year before an ankle injury essentially ended her season. Scored 40 points on 35 kills, three aces and two blocks in 22 sets of action in Montreux, Switzerland and Russia. Scored 10 points as Team USA beat The Netherlands on June 7 in Montreux, the American’s only win at the tournament.
- 2001 – Saw limited action with the U.S. Women’s National Volleyball team while playing in three competitions during the year. Played in 50 sets and posted 113 kills, 89 digs and 7 aces. She blasted a team-season high 24 kills in a five-set win over Cuba on October 12. Also had 18 kills in a four-set loss to Korea on November 13 in the World Grand Champions Cup and 16 kills three nights later in a four-set win over Russia.

== College highlights ==
- 1997 – Earned first-team All-Western Athletic Conference honors. Also named a WAC Scholar-Athlete…Honored as a WAC Player of the Week twice (September 2 and October 27). Finished her career fourth on all-time kill list (1,467) and fifth in kills per game (3.72).
- 1996 – Named Most Valuable Player of the WAC’s Pacific Division. Also earned first-team All-WAC honors. Led the Rainbows to the NCAA championship match, where they lost to Stanford.
- 1995 – Earned first-team All-Big West honors.
- 1994 – Named to the Big West Conference All-Freshman team.
