= Olga Zhitova =

Russian volleyball player (born 1983)

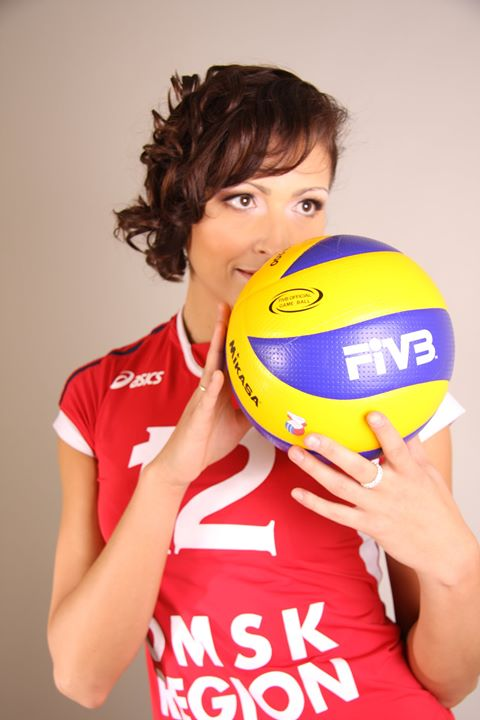
- Zhitova in 2014

Personal information
- Born: 25 July 1983 (age 42) Irkutsk, Russia
- Height: 190 cm (6 ft 3 in)

Sport
- Sport: Volleyball
- Club: Dynamo Moscow

Olga Zhitova (born 25 July 1983) is a retired Russian volleyball player. She was a member of the Russian team that won the gold medal at the 2006 FIVB Women's World Championship.
