= Juana González =

Dominican Republic volleyball and basketball player

Personal information
- Full name: Juana Miguelina González Sánchez
- Nationality: Dominican
- Born: January 3, 1979 (age 47); Laguna Salada, Valverde
- Hometown: Santo Domingo
- Height: 1.85 m (6 ft 1 in)
- Weight: 70 kg (154 lb)
- Spike: 295 cm (116 in)
- Block: 290 cm (110 in)

Volleyball information
- Position: Setter

National team
2000 - 2006	Dominican Republic
Honours
Women's volleyball
Representing the Dominican Republic
Central American and Caribbean Games
Gold medal – first place	2006 Cartagena	Team
Pan-American Cup
Silver medal – second place	2005 Santo Domingo	Team
Bronze medal – third place	2006 San Juan	Team
NORCECA Championship
Bronze medal – third place	2005 Port of Spain	Team
Women's basketball
Representing the Dominican Republic
Centrobasket
Bronze medal – third place	2008 Morovis	Team
- Last updated: October 2010

Juana Miguelina González Sánchez (born January 3, 1979, in Laguna Salada, Valverde) is a volleyball and basketball player from the Dominican Republic. She competed for her native country at the 2004 Summer Olympics in Athens, Greece, wearing the number #11 jersey. There, she ended up in eleventh place with the Dominican Republic women's national team. Gonzalez played as a setter.

== Career ==
At the 2000 USA Volleyball Open Championships, playing with the Dominican Dream Team, Gonzalez won the championship and she was selected "All-Tournament".

As a basketball player, she played for her national team in the 2008 Centrobasket tournament, helping her team to win the bronze medal.

== Clubs ==
- (Dominican Republic) Simon Bolivar (2000)
- (Dominican Republic) Modeca (2003)
- (Dominican Republic) Los Cachorros (2004)
- (Dominican Republic) Los Prados (2005)
- (Dominican Republic) Modeca (2006)

== Awards ==
=== Individuals ===
- 2000 USA Open Championships "All-Tournament Team"
- 2006 Central American and Caribbean Games "Best Setter"
