= Lindsey Hunter (volleyball) =

American volleyball player (born 1984)

Personal information
- Nationality: American
- Born: March 30, 1984 (age 42)
- Height: 5 ft 10 in (178 cm)
- Weight: 152 lb (69 kg)

Volleyball information
- Number: 16 (national team)

National team
2007	United States

Lindsey Hunter (born March 30, 1984) is a retired American female volleyball player. She was part of the United States women's national volleyball team.

She participated at the 2007 Pan American Games, and at the 2007 FIVB Volleyball Women's World Cup.
