= Former UYBA Volley squads =

This article shows past squads from the Italian professional volleyball team UYBA Volley from the Serie A League.

== 2025–26 ==
2025–2026 Team
Number	Player	Position	Height (m)	Birth date
1	(Italy) Valeria Battista (c)	Outside Hitter	1.79	23 January 2001 (age 25)
2	(Italy) Federica Pelloni	Libero	1.72	26 December 2002 (age 23)
3	(Italy) Alessia Gennari	Outside Hitter	1.84	3 November 1991 (age 34)
4	(Egypt) Mariam Metwally	Outside Hitter	1.84	2 January 1999 (age 27)
5	(Japan) Nanami Seki	Setter	1.71	12 June 1999 (age 27)
6	(United States) Carter Booth (Note: Carter Booth joined the team on 5 January 2026.)	Middle Blocker	2.01	23 October 2003 (age 22)
~~6~~	(Belgium) ~~Silke Van Avermaet~~ (Note: Silke Van Avermaet left the team on 5 January 2026.)	~~Middle Blocker~~	~~1.92~~	~~2 June 1999 (age 27)~~
7	(Italy) Valentina Diouf	Opposite	2.02	10 January 1993 (age 33)
8	(Austria) Dana Schmit (Note: Dana Schmit joined the team on 23 October 2025.)	Setter	1.78	20 July 1997 (age 29)
10	(Italy) Francesca Parlangeli	Libero	1.65	23 February 1990 (age 36)
11	(Italy) Josephine Obossa	Opposite	1.83	2 May 1999 (age 27)
17	(Italy) Katja Eckl	Middle Blocker	1.88	6 May 2003 (age 23)
18	(Italy) Alice Torcolacci	Middle Blocker	1.84	27 February 2000 (age 26)
19	(Italy) Jennifer Boldini	Setter	1.87	6 April 1999 (age 27)
23	(Mexico) Melanie Parra	Outside Hitter	1.81	12 September 2002 (age 23)

== 2024–25 ==
2024–2025 Team
Number	Player	Position	Height (m)	Birth date
1	(United States) Skyy Howard	Middle Blocker	1.91	25 June 2001 (age 25)
2	(Italy) Federica Pelloni	Libero	1.72	26 December 2002 (age 23)
3	(Netherlands) Pleun Van Der Pijl	Opposite	1.96	11 January 2003 (age 23)
4	(Italy) Rebecca Piva	Outside Hitter	1.86	1 May 2001 (age 25)
~~5~~	(Colombia) ~~Ana Karina Olaya~~ (Note: Silvia Lotti left the team on 9 December 2025.)	~~Outside Hitter~~	~~1.87~~	~~13 September 2002 (age 23)~~
6	(Belgium) Silke Van Avermaet	Middle Blocker	1.92	2 June 1999 (age 27)
7	(Italy) Martina Morandi	Libero	1.75	16 January 2002 (age 24)
8	(Italy) Giuditta Lualdi (c)	Middle Blocker	1.86	13 September 1995 (age 30)
10	(Italy) Benedetta Sartori	Middle Blocker	1.87	14 April 2001 (age 25)
11	(Italy) Josephine Obossa	Opposite	1.83	2 May 1999 (age 27)
12	(Italy) Giorgia Frosini	Opposite	1.89	29 November 2002 (age 23)
14	(Switzerland) Laura Künzler	Outside Hitter	1.89	25 December 1996 (age 29)
18	(Sweden) Alexandra Lazić (Note: Alexandra Lazić joined the team on 17 January 2025.)	Outside Hitter	1.88	24 September 1994 (age 31)
19	(Italy) Jennifer Boldini	Setter	1.87	6 April 1999 (age 27)
20	(Italy) Francesca Scola	Setter	1.83	15 September 2001 (age 24)

== 2023–24 ==
2023–2024 Team
Number	Player	Position	Height (m)	Birth date
~~1~~	(United States) ~~T'ara Ceasar~~ (Note: T'ara Ceasar left the team on 22 December 2023.)	~~Outside Hitter~~	~~1.85~~	~~20 July 1999 (age 27)~~
2	(Italy) Martina Bracchi	Opposite	1.82	25 April 2002 (age 24)
3	(Italy) Alessia Fini (Note: Alessia Fini joined the team on 22 December 2023.)	Libero	1.70	3 August 2004 (age 22)
4	(Italy) Rebecca Piva	Outside Hitter	1.86	1 May 2001 (age 25)
5	(United States) Skylar Fields (Note: Skylar Fields joined the team in January 2024.)	Opposite	1.88	17 February 2001 (age 25)
5	(China) Simin Wang	Libero	1.66	13 December 1997 (age 28)
8	(Italy) Giuditta Lualdi (c)	Middle Blocker	1.86	13 September 1995 (age 30)
10	(Italy) Benedetta Sartori	Middle Blocker	1.87	14 April 2001 (age 25)
11	(Italy) Federica Carletti	Outside Hitter	1.84	14 March 2000 (age 26)
12	(Italy) Giorgia Frosini	Opposite	1.89	29 November 2002 (age 23)
13	(Italy) Dominika Giuliani	Outside Hitter	1.92	26 November 2004 (age 21)
14	(Italy) Giorgia Zannoni	Libero	1.71	11 February 1998 (age 28)
15	(Belgium) Dominika Sobolska	Middle Blocker	1.87	3 December 1991 (age 34)
16	(Czech Republic) Kateřina Valková	Setter	1.77	6 February 1996 (age 30)
18	(Puerto Rico) Paola Rojas	Middle Blocker	1.82	26 January 1996 (age 30)
19	(Italy) Jennifer Boldini	Setter	1.87	6 April 1999 (age 27)

== 2022–23 ==
2022–2023 Team
Number	Player	Position	Height (m)	Birth date
1	(Italy) Valeria Battista	Outside Hitter	1.79	23 January 2001 (age 25)
2	(Italy) Alice Degradi	Outside Hitter	1.81	10 April 1996 (age 30)
3	(United States) Carli Lloyd	Setter	1.80	6 August 1989 (age 36)
5	(Italy) Sofia Monza	Setter	1.74	11 May 2002 (age 24)
7	(Brazil) Rosamaria Montibeller	Opposite	1.86	9 April 1994 (age 32)
8	(Italy) Giuditta Lualdi	Middle Blocker	1.86	13 September 1995 (age 30)
10	(Germany) Lena Stigrot	Outside Hitter	1.82	20 December 1994 (age 31)
12	(Italy) Valentina Colombo	Middle Blocker	1.85	12 December 2003 (age 22)
13	(Italy) Rossella Olivotto (c)	Middle Blocker	1.89	27 April 1991 (age 35)
14	(Italy) Giorgia Zannoni	Libero	1.71	11 February 1998 (age 28)
15	(Italy) Loveth Omoruyi	Outside Hitter	1.84	25 August 2002 (age 23)
16	(Cyprus) Katerina Zakchaiou	Middle Blocker	1.92	26 July 1998 (age 28)
17	(Italy) Chiara Bressan	Libero	1.70	2 September 2004 (age 21)

== 2021–22 ==
2021–2022 Team
Number	Player	Position	Height (m)	Birth date
1	(United States) Jordyn Poulter	Setter	1.88	31 July 1997 (age 29)
2	(Italy) Valeria Battista	Outside Hitter	1.79	23 January 2001 (age 25)
3	(Italy) Rossella Olivotto	Middle Blocker	1.89	27 April 1991 (age 35)
4	(Argentina) Victoria Mayer	Setter	1.80	19 June 2001 (age 25)
5	(Italy) Sofia Monza	Setter	1.74	11 May 2002 (age 24)
7	(Italy) Chiara Bressan	Libero	1.70	2 September 2004 (age 21)
8	(Canada) Alexa Gray	Outside Hitter	1.85	7 August 1994 (age 31)
10	(Italy) Valentina Colombo	Middle Blocker	1.85	12 December 2003 (age 22)
11	(Italy) Camilla Mingardi	Opposite	1.86	19 October 1997 (age 28)
14	(Italy) Giorgia Zannoni	Libero	1.71	11 February 1998 (age 28)
15	(Serbia) Jovana Stevanović (c)	Middle Blocker	1.91	30 June 1992 (age 34)
16	(Italy) Lucia Bosetti	Outside Hitter	1.75	9 July 1989 (age 37)
19	(Romania) Adelina Budăi-Ungureanu	Outside Hitter	1.87	29 July 2000 (age 26)
23	(Cuba) Liset Herrera	Middle Blocker	1.92	6 December 1998 (age 27)

== 2020–21 ==
2020–2021 Team
Number	Player	Position	Height (m)	Birth date
1	(United States) Jordyn Poulter	Setter	1.88	31 July 1997 (age 29)
3	(Italy) Rossella Olivotto	Middle Blocker	1.89	27 April 1991 (age 35)
6	(Italy) Alessia Gennari (c)	Outside Hitter	1.84	3 November 1991 (age 34)
7	(Italy) Asia Bonelli	Setter	1.81	4 September 2000 (age 25)
8	(Canada) Alexa Gray	Outside Hitter	1.85	7 August 1994 (age 31)
9	(Italy) Giulia Leonardi	Libero	1.65	1 December 1987 (age 38)
11	(Italy) Camilla Mingardi	Opposite	1.86	19 October 1997 (age 28)
12	(Italy) Francesca Piccinini	Outside Hitter	1.85	10 January 1979 (age 47)
13	(Italy) Chiara Cucco	Libero	1.68	14 November 2002 (age 23)
14	(Italy) Giulia Galletti	Setter	1.88	4 June 1999 (age 27)
15	(Serbia) Jovana Stevanović	Middle Blocker	1.91	30 June 1992 (age 34)
17	(Spain) Ana Escamilla	Outside Hitter	1.84	10 July 1998 (age 28)
18	(Italy) Katarina Bulovic	Outside Hitter	1.88	19 January 2002 (age 24)
23	(Cuba) Liset Herrera	Middle Blocker	1.92	6 December 1998 (age 27)

== 2019–20 ==
2019–2020 Team
Number	Player	Position	Height (m)	Birth date
1	(United States) Haleigh Washington	Middle Blocker	1.92	22 September 1995 (age 30)
2	(Italy) Giulia Bonifacio	Outside Hitter	1.80	7 October 2002 (age 23)
3	(Albania) Erblira Bici	Opposite	1.85	27 June 1995 (age 31)
4	(Belgium) Britt Herbots	Outside Hitter	1.82	24 September 1999 (age 26)
5	(China) Simin Wang	Libero	1.66	13 December 1997 (age 28)
6	(Italy) Alessia Gennari (c)	Outside Hitter	1.84	3 November 1991 (age 34)
7	(Italy) Maria Luisa Cumino	Setter	1.77	22 April 1992 (age 34)
8	(Italy) Alessia Orro	Setter	1.80	18 July 1998 (age 28)
9	(Italy) Giulia Leonardi	Libero	1.65	1 December 1987 (age 38)
10	(Italy) Francesca Villani	Outside Hitter	1.87	30 May 1995 (age 31)
11	(United States) Karsta Lowe	Opposite	1.96	2 February 1993 (age 33)
12	(Italy) Francesca Piccinini	Outside Hitter	1.85	10 January 1979 (age 47)
13	(Italy) Sara Bonifacio	Middle Blocker	1.85	3 July 1996 (age 30)
14	(Italy) Beatrice Negretti	Libero	1.70	16 November 1999 (age 26)
15	(Italy) Beatrice Berti	Middle Blocker	1.93	12 January 1996 (age 30)
18	(Italy) Katarina Bulovic	Outside Hitter	1.88	19 January 2002 (age 24)

== 2018–19 ==
2018–2019 Team
Number	Player	Position	Height (m)	Birth date
1	(Italy) Vittoria Piani	Opposite	1.87	12 February 1998 (age 28)
2	(Italy) Sofia Monza	Setter	1.74	11 May 2002 (age 24)
3	(Italy) Virginia Peruzzo	Outside Hitter	1.79	7 November 2000 (age 25)
4	(Belgium) Britt Herbots	Outside Hitter	1.82	24 September 1999 (age 26)
5	(Belgium) Kaja Grobelna	Opposite	1.88	4 January 1995 (age 31)
6	(Italy) Alessia Gennari (c)	Outside Hitter	1.84	3 November 1991 (age 34)
7	(Italy) Maria Luisa Cumino	Setter	1.77	22 April 1992 (age 34)
8	(Italy) Alessia Orro	Setter	1.80	18 July 1998 (age 28)
9	(Italy) Giulia Leonardi	Libero	1.65	1 December 1987 (age 38)
13	(Italy) Sara Bonifacio	Middle Blocker	1.85	3 July 1996 (age 30)
14	(Netherlands) Floortje Meijners	Outside Hitter	1.92	16 January 1987 (age 39)
15	(Italy) Beatrice Berti	Middle Blocker	1.93	12 January 1996 (age 30)
17	(Croatia) Martina Šamadan	Middle Blocker	1.93	11 September 1993 (age 32)
18	(Romania) Alexandra Botezat	Middle Blocker	1.96	3 August 1998 (age 28)

== 2017–18 ==
2017–2018 Team
Number	Player	Position	Height (m)	Birth date
1	(Italy) Vittoria Piani	Opposite	1.87	12 February 1998 (age 28)
2	(Italy) Federica Stufi (c)	Middle Blocker	1.85	22 March 1988 (age 38)
4	(Italy) Beatrice Badini	Middle Blocker	1.85	1 July 1999 (age 27)
5	(Italy) Ilaria Spirito	Libero	1.75	20 February 1994 (age 32)
6	(Italy) Alessia Gennari	Outside Hitter	1.84	3 November 1991 (age 34)
7	(Italy) Stefania Dall'Igna	Setter	1.75	22 November 1984 (age 41)
8	(Italy) Alessia Orro	Setter	1.80	18 July 1998 (age 28)
9	(United States) Sarah Wilhite Parsons	Outside Hitter	1.86	20 July 1995 (age 31)
13	(Italy) Valentina Diouf	Opposite	2.02	10 January 1993 (age 33)
14	(United States) Michelle Bartsch-Hackley	Outside Hitter	1.92	12 February 1990 (age 36)
15	(Italy) Beatrice Berti	Middle Blocker	1.93	12 January 1996 (age 30)
16	(Italy) Beatrice Negretti	Libero	1.70	16 November 1999 (age 26)
17	(Bulgaria) Silvana Chausheva	Outside Hitter	1.88	19 May 1995 (age 31)
18	(Romania) Alexandra Botezat	Middle Blocker	1.96	3 August 1998 (age 28)

== 2016–17 ==
2016–2017 Team
Number	Player	Position	Height (m)	Weight (kg)	Birth date
2	(Italy) Federica Stufi	Middle Blocker	1.85	67	22 March 1988 (age 38)
3	(Italy) Noemi Signorile	Setter	1.83	71	15 February 1990 (age 36)
4	(Italy) Caterina Cialfi	Setter	1.80	75	17 August 1995 (age 30)
5	(Italy) Ilaria Spirito	Libero	1.75	65	20 February 1994 (age 32)
6	(Italy) Valentina Fiorin	Outside Hitter	1.87	84	9 October 1984 (age 41)
7	(Poland) Agata Witkowska	Libero	1.70	65	19 August 1989 (age 36)
8	(Dominican Republic) Brayelin Martínez	Opposite	2.01	85	11 September 1996 (age 29)
10	(United States) Taylor Simpson	Outside Hitter	1.90	85	10 September 1993 (age 32)
11	(Greece) Anthī Vasilantōnakī	Opposite	1.95	82	9 April 1996 (age 30)
13	(Italy) Valentina Diouf	Opposite	2.02	96	10 January 1993 (age 33)
14	(Italy) Serena Moneta	Outside Hitter	1.78	65	17 December 1990 (age 35)
15	(Italy) Beatrice Berti	Middle Blocker	1.93	88	12 January 1996 (age 30)
17	(Italy) Giulia Pisani (c)	Middle Blocker	1.84	73	4 June 1992 (age 34)

== 2015–16 ==
2015–2016 Team
Number	Player	Position	Height (m)	Weight (kg)	Birth date
1	(Belgium) Hélène Rousseaux	Outside Hitter	1.87	70	25 September 1991 (age 34)
2	(Italy) Alice Degradi	Outside Hitter	1.81	75	10 April 1996 (age 30)
3	(Italy) Caterina Cialfi	Setter	1.80	71	17 August 1995 (age 30)
6	(Italy) Silvia Fondriest	Middle Blocker	1.88	76	29 December 1988 (age 37)
7	(United States) Jenna Hagglund (c)	Setter	1.77	75	28 May 1989 (age 37)
8	(Canada) Jaimie Thibeault	Middle Blocker	1.88	75	23 September 1989 (age 36)
9	(Italy) Valeria Papa	Outside Hitter	1.83	69	9 September 1989 (age 36)
11	(United States) Karsta Lowe	Opposite	1.93	75	2 February 1993 (age 33)
12	(Italy) Giulia Angelina	Outside Hitter	1.92	89	26 February 1997 (age 29)
14	(Turkey) Gözde Yılmaz	Outside Hitter	1.94	82	9 September 1991 (age 34)
17	(Italy) Giulia Pisani	Middle Blocker	1.84	69	4 June 1992 (age 34)
18	(Italy) Celeste Poma	Libero	1.68	60	10 November 1991 (age 34)

== 2014–15 ==
2014–2015 Team
Number	Player	Position	Height (m)	Weight (kg)	Birth date
1	(Russia) Ekaterina Lyubushkina	Middle Blocker	1.90	77	2 January 1990 (age 36)
2	(Italy) Alice Degradi	Outside Hitter	1.81	75	10 April 1996 (age 30)
3	(Italy) Valentina Rania	Outside Hitter	1.83	77	24 March 1985 (age 41)
5	(United Kingdom) Ciara Michel	Middle Blocker	1.94	74	2 July 1985 (age 41)
6	(Italy) Giulia Leonardi	Libero	1.65	65	1 December 1987 (age 38)
7	(Italy) Francesca Marcon	Outside Hitter	1.80	70	9 July 1983 (age 43)
8	(United States) Rebecca Perry	Opposite	1.88	75	29 December 1988 (age 37)
9	(Belgium) Freya Aelbrecht	Middle Blocker	1.89	84	10 February 1990 (age 36)
12	(Italy) Letizia Camera	Setter	1.75	70	1 October 1992 (age 33)
13	(Italy) Valentina Diouf	Opposite	2.02	90	10 January 1993 (age 33)
14	(Poland) Joanna Wołosz	Setter	1.81	75	7 April 1990 (age 36)
16	(Czech Republic) Helena Havelková	Outside Hitter	1.88	78	25 July 1988 (age 38)
17	(Italy) Giulia Pisani	Middle Blocker	1.84	80	4 June 1992 (age 34)

== 2013–14 ==
2013–2014 Team
Number	Player	Position	Height (m)	Weight (kg)	Birth date
1	(Italy) Serena Ortolani	Opposite	1.87	70	7 January 1987 (age 39)
3	(Italy) Ilaria Garzaro	Middle Blocker	1.88	81	29 September 1986 (age 39)
4	(Italy) Marika Bianchini	Outside Hitter	1.78	70	23 April 1993 (age 33)
5	(United Kingdom) Ciara Michel	Middle Blocker	1.94	74	2 July 1985 (age 41)
6	(Italy) Giulia Leonardi	Libero	1.65	65	1 December 1987 (age 38)
7	(Italy) Francesca Marcon	Outside Hitter	1.80	70	9 July 1983 (age 43)
9	(Italy) Ilaria Spirito	Libero	1.75	69	20 February 1994 (age 32)
10	(Netherlands) Lonneke Slöetjes	Opposite	1.92	76	15 November 1990 (age 35)
12	(Netherlands) Anne Buijs	Outside Hitter	1.91	74	2 December 1991 (age 34)
13	(Italy) Valentina Arrighetti	Middle Blocker	1.85	75	26 January 1985 (age 41)
14	(Poland) Joanna Wołosz	Setter	1.81	75	7 April 1990 (age 36)
15	(Italy) Alessandra Petrucci	Setter	1.84	75	11 February 1983 (age 43)

== 2012–13 ==
2012–2013 Team
Number	Player	Position	Height (m)	Weight (kg)	Birth date
1	(United States) Juliann Faucette	Opposite	1.88	87	25 November 1989 (age 36)
3	(United States) Carli Lloyd	Setter	1.80	78	6 August 1989 (age 36)
4	(Germany) Maren Brinker	Outside Hitter	1.86	75	10 July 1986 (age 40)
6	(Italy) Giulia Leonardi	Libero	1.65	65	1 December 1987 (age 38)
7	(Italy) Francesca Marcon	Outside Hitter	1.80	70	9 July 1983 (age 43)
8	(France) Christina Bauer	Middle Blocker	1.97	85	1 January 1988 (age 38)
10	(Germany) Margareta Kozuch	Opposite	1.88	72	30 October 1986 (age 39)
11	(Italy) Gilda Lombardo	Outside Hitter	1.80	74	2 July 1989 (age 37)
13	(Italy) Valentina Arrighetti	Middle Blocker	1.85	75	26 January 1985 (age 41)
14	(Italy) Valeria Caracuta	Setter	1.71	60	14 December 1987 (age 38)
17	(Italy) Giulia Pisani	Middle Blocker	1.84	80	4 June 1992 (age 34)
18	(Italy) Veronica Bisconti	Libero	1.73	60	27 January 1991 (age 35)

== 2011–12 ==
2011–2012 Team
Number	Player	Position	Height (m)	Weight (kg)	Birth date
3	(United States) Carli Lloyd	Setter	1.80	78	6 August 1989 (age 36)
4	(Czech Republic) Aneta Havlíčková	Opposite	1.90	97	3 July 1987 (age 39)
5	(Italy) Chiara Dall'Ora	Middle Blocker	1.87	75	11 January 1983 (age 43)
6	(Italy) Giulia Leonardi	Libero	1.65	65	1 December 1987 (age 38)
7	(Italy) Francesca Marcon	Outside Hitter	1.80	70	9 July 1983 (age 43)
8	(France) Christina Bauer	Middle Blocker	1.97	85	1 January 1988 (age 38)
9	(Netherlands) Floortje Meijners	Outside Hitter	1.90	78	16 June 1987 (age 39)
10	(Italy) Silvia Lotti	Outside Hitter	1.88	73	17 June 1992 (age 34)
14	(Italy) Valeria Caracuta	Setter	1.71	60	14 December 1987 (age 38)
16	(Czech Republic) Helena Havelková	Outside Hitter	1.86	70	25 July 1988 (age 38)
17	(Italy) Giulia Pisani	Middle Blocker	1.84	80	4 June 1992 (age 34)
18	(Italy) Veronica Bisconti	Libero	1.73	60	27 January 1991 (age 35)

== 2010–11 ==
2010–2011 Team
Number	Player	Position	Height (m)	Weight (kg)	Birth date
1	(Italy) Luna Carocci	Libero	1.74	62	10 July 1988 (age 38)
2	(Czech Republic) Aneta Havlíčková	Opposite	1.90	97	3 July 1987 (age 39)
4	(Italy) Federica Valeriano	Outside Hitter	1.79	66	15 October 1985 (age 40)
5	(Italy) Mi-Na Kim	Setter	1.76	69	4 February 1984 (age 42)
7	(Italy) Francesca Marcon	Outside Hitter	1.80	70	9 July 1983 (age 43)
8	(France) Christina Bauer	Middle Blocker	1.97	85	1 January 1988 (age 38)
9	(Netherlands) Floortje Meijners	Outside Hitter	1.90	78	16 June 1987 (age 39)
10	(Italy) Barbara Campanari	Middle Blocker	1.91	77	4 February 1980 (age 46)
13	(Italy) Valentina Serena	Setter	1.84	71	10 November 1981 (age 44)
14	(Italy) Lucia Crisanti	Middle Blocker	1.86	70	16 March 1986 (age 40)
16	(Czech Republic) Helena Havelková	Outside Hitter	1.86	70	25 July 1988 (age 38)

== 2009–10 ==
2009–2010 Team
Number	Player	Position	Height (m)	Weight (kg)	Birth date
3	(Brazil) Fernanda Ferreira	Setter	1.72	66	10 January 1980 (age 46)
4	(Italy) Federica Valeriano	Outside Hitter	1.79	66	15 October 1985 (age 40)
5	(Italy) Mi-Na Kim	Setter	1.76	69	4 February 1984 (age 42)
6	(Romania) Carmen Turlea	Opposite	1.83	69	18 November 1975 (age 50)
7	(Slovakia) Katarina Kovacova	Middle Blocker	1.87	76	21 October 1981 (age 44)
8	(Italy) Giulia Decordi	Outside Hitter	1.84	62	5 November 1986 (age 39)
10	(Italy) Barbara Campanari	Middle Blocker	1.91	77	4 February 1980 (age 46)
11	(Italy) Stefania Okaka	Outside Hitter	1.85	83	9 August 1989 (age 36)
13	(Italy) Maurizia Borri	Libero	1.77	66	24 February 1977 (age 49)
14	(Italy) Lucia Crisanti	Middle Blocker	1.86	70	16 March 1986 (age 40)
15	(Italy) Barbara De Luca	Outside Hitter	1.85	73	19 July 1975 (age 51)
16	(Czech Republic) Helena Havelková	Outside Hitter	1.86	70	25 July 1988 (age 38)
