= Former Volley Bergamo squads =

This article shows past squads from the Italian professional volleyball team Volley Bergamo from the Serie A League.

== 2025–26 ==
2025–2026 Team
Number	Player	Position	Height (m)	Birth date
1	(Italy) Roberta Carraro	Setter	1.81	17 November 1998 (age 27)
2	(Italy) Chidera Blessing Eze	Setter	1.81	2 September 2003 (age 22)
3	(Italy) Alessia Bolzonetti	Outside Hitter	1.87	15 February 2002 (age 24)
5	(United States) Kendall Kipp	Opposite	1.96	12 December 2000 (age 25)
6	(Italy) Federica Ferrario	Libero	1.62	31 May 2001 (age 25)
7	(United States) Jenny Mosser	Outside Hitter	1.80	10 October 1998 (age 27)
8	(Germany) Monique Strubbe	Middle Blocker	1.89	5 July 2001 (age 25)
9	(Italy) Aurora Micheletti	Middle Blocker	1.90	27 April 2005 (age 21)
10	(Italy) Martina Armini	Libero	1.75	19 September 2002 (age 23)
13	(Germany) Emilia Weske	Opposite	1.88	26 March 2001 (age 25)
15	(Italy) Linda Manfredini	Middle Blocker	1.86	14 May 2006 (age 20)
16	(Czech Republic) Michaela Mlejnková (c)	Outside Hitter	1.85	26 July 1996 (age 29)
17	(Italy) Denise Meli	Middle Blocker	1.83	9 April 2001 (age 25)
26	(Cuba) Ailama Cesé	Outside Hitter	1.90	29 October 2000 (age 25)

== 2024–25 ==
2024–2025 Team
Number	Player	Position	Height (m)	Birth date
1	(Italy) Vittoria Piani	Opposite	1.87	12 February 1998 (age 28)
3	(Italy) Virginia Adriano	Opposite	1.96	22 July 2004 (age 21)
5	(Italy) Roberta Carraro	Setter	1.81	17 November 1998 (age 27)
7	(Italy) Alessia Bolzonetti	Outside Hitter	1.87	15 February 2002 (age 24)
8	(Germany) Monique Strubbe	Middle Blocker	1.89	5 July 2001 (age 25)
9	(Italy) Alessandra Mistretta	Libero	1.65	5 February 2002 (age 24)
10	(Italy) Martina Armini	Libero	1.75	19 September 2002 (age 23)
11	(Italy) Alice Farina	Middle Blocker	1.89	26 June 2000 (age 26)
13	(United States) Ashley Evans	Setter	1.90	23 December 1994 (age 31)
15	(Italy) Linda Manfredini	Middle Blocker	1.86	14 May 2006 (age 20)
16	(Czech Republic) Michaela Mlejnková (c)	Outside Hitter	1.85	26 July 1996 (age 29)
22	(Puerto Rico) Elissa Alcantara	Outside Hitter	1.80	11 January 2001 (age 25)
23	(Italy) Viola Spampatti	Libero	1.73	28 November 2006 (age 19)
24	(Italy) Maria Alessandra Crevenna	Middle Blocker	1.86	14 November 2006 (age 19)
26	(Cuba) Ailama Cesé	Outside Hitter	1.90	29 October 2000 (age 25)

== 2023–24 ==
2023–2024 Team
Number	Player	Position	Height (m)	Birth date
1	(Italy) Laura Bovo	Middle Blocker	1.92	15 May 1996 (age 30)
2	(United States) Audriana Fitzmorris	Opposite	1.97	30 October 1997 (age 28)
3	(Poland) Olivia Różański	Outside Hitter	1.85	5 June 1997 (age 29)
4	(Croatia) Božana Butigan	Middle Blocker	1.92	19 August 2000 (age 25)
5	(Italy) Rebecca Scialanca	Libero	1.65	29 May 2005 (age 21)
6	(Italy) Giada Cecchetto	Libero	1.64	6 June 1991 (age 35)
7	(Brazil) Lorrayna Marys	Opposite	1.85	19 June 1999 (age 27)
9	(Italy) Laura Pasquino	Setter	1.81	9 January 2002 (age 24)
10	(Italy) Luna Cicola	Libero	1.70	15 January 2004 (age 22)
11	(Italy) Stella Nervini	Outside Hitter	1.84	10 September 2003 (age 22)
13	(Italy) Aurora Pistolesi	Outside Hitter	1.82	3 June 1999 (age 27)
18	(Belarus) Anna Davyskiba	Outside Hitter	1.88	8 February 2000 (age 26)
19	(Italy) Laura Melandri	Middle Blocker	1.86	31 January 1995 (age 31)
22	(Italy) Federica Stufi	Middle Blocker	1.85	22 March 1988 (age 38)
23	(Italy) Giulia Gennari (c)	Setter	1.84	23 June 1996 (age 30)

== 2022–23 ==
2022–2023 Team
Number	Player	Position	Height (m)	Birth date
1	(Italy) Laura Bovo	Middle Blocker	1.92	15 May 1996 (age 30)
4	(Croatia) Božana Butigan	Middle Blocker	1.92	19 August 2000 (age 25)
5	(Italy) Laura Partenio	Outside Hitter	1.83	29 December 1991 (age 34)
6	(Italy) Giada Cecchetto	Libero	1.64	6 June 1991 (age 35)
7	(Brazil) Lorrayna Marys	Opposite	1.85	19 June 1999 (age 27)
10	(Italy) Luna Cicola	Libero	1.70	15 January 2004 (age 22)
11	(Italy) Sofia Turlà	Setter	1.78	3 February 1998 (age 28)
13	(United States) Mackenzie May	Outside Hitter	1.90	12 January 1999 (age 27)
14	(Italy) Giorgia Frosini	Opposite	1.89	29 November 2002 (age 23)
16	(United States) Khalia Lanier	Outside Hitter	1.86	19 September 1998 (age 27)
18	(Italy) Emma Cagnin	Outside Hitter	1.86	26 June 2002 (age 24)
22	(Italy) Federica Stufi (c)	Middle Blocker	1.85	22 March 1988 (age 38)
23	(Italy) Giulia Gennari	Setter	1.84	23 June 1996 (age 30)

== 2021–22 ==
2021–2022 Team
Number	Player	Position	Height (m)	Birth date
1	(Italy) Fatim Kone	Middle Blocker	1.82	25 October 2000 (age 25)
2	(Finland) Daniela Öhman	Middle Blocker	1.85	16 March 1997 (age 29)
3	(Canada) Alicia Ogoms	Middle Blocker	1.94	2 April 1994 (age 32)
4	(Croatia) Božana Butigan	Middle Blocker	1.92	19 August 2000 (age 25)
6	(Puerto Rico) Stephanie Enright	Outside Hitter	1.79	15 December 1990 (age 35)
7	(Italy) Isabella Di Iulio	Setter	1.75	26 November 1991 (age 34)
8	(Brazil) Ana Paula Borgo	Opposite	1.87	20 October 1993 (age 32)
9	(Italy) Francesca Marcon	Outside Hitter	1.80	9 July 1983 (age 42)
10	(Italy) Luna Cicola	Libero	1.70	15 January 2004 (age 22)
11	(Italy) Sofia Turlà	Setter	1.78	3 February 1998 (age 28)
13	(United States) Mackenzie May	Outside Hitter	1.90	12 January 1999 (age 27)
14	(Germany) Marie Schoelzel	Middle Blocker	1.90	1 August 1997 (age 28)
15	(Italy) Giorgia Faraone	Libero	1.68	6 July 1994 (age 32)
16	(United States) Khalia Lanier	Outside Hitter	1.86	19 September 1998 (age 27)
17	(Italy) Sara Loda (c)	Outside Hitter	1.78	22 August 1990 (age 35)
18	(Italy) Emma Cagnin	Outside Hitter	1.86	26 June 2002 (age 24)

== 2020–21 ==
2020–2021 Team
Number	Player	Position	Height (m)	Birth date
1	(United States) Juliann Johnson	Opposite	1.90	25 November 1989 (age 36)
6	(Puerto Rico) Stephanie Enright	Outside Hitter	1.79	15 December 1990 (age 35)
7	(Italy) Vittoria Prandi	Setter	1.80	4 November 1994 (age 31)
8	(Italy) Eleonora Fersino	Libero	1.69	24 January 2000 (age 26)
9	(Italy) Francesca Marcon	Outside Hitter	1.80	9 July 1983 (age 42)
10	(Croatia) Katarina Luketić	Opposite	1.90	28 September 1998 (age 27)
13	(Croatia) Beta Dumančić	Middle Blocker	1.89	26 March 1991 (age 35)
14	(Puerto Rico) Natalia Valentin	Setter	1.70	12 September 1989 (age 36)
15	(Italy) Giorgia Faraone	Libero	1.68	6 July 1994 (age 32)
16	(United States) Khalia Lanier	Outside Hitter	1.86	19 September 1998 (age 27)
17	(Italy) Sara Loda (c)	Outside Hitter	1.78	22 August 1990 (age 35)
18	(Italy) Gaia Moretto	Middle Blocker	1.92	18 September 1994 (age 31)
24	(Italy) Giulia Mio Bertolo	Middle Blocker	1.87	24 May 1995 (age 31)

== 2019–20 ==
2019–2020 Team
Number	Player	Position	Height (m)	Birth date
1	(Poland) Malwina Smarzek	Opposite	1.91	3 June 1996 (age 30)
2	(Italy) Lucia Imperiali	Libero	1.62	5 May 1999 (age 27)
3	(Italy) Rossella Olivotto	Middle Blocker	1.89	27 April 1991 (age 35)
4	(Canada) Kiera Van Ryk	Opposite	1.89	6 January 1999 (age 27)
5	(Italy) Imma Sirressi	Libero	1.75	19 May 1990 (age 36)
7	(Italy) Vittoria Prandi	Setter	1.80	4 November 1994 (age 31)
8	(Brazil) Samara Almeida	Outside Hitter	1.87	16 July 1992 (age 33)
9	(Italy) Laura Melandri	Middle Blocker	1.86	31 January 1995 (age 31)
13	(Serbia) Sladjana Mirkovic	Setter	1.85	7 October 1995 (age 30)
16	(Italy) Giada Civitico	Middle Blocker	1.91	5 December 2000 (age 25)
17	(Italy) Sara Loda (c)	Outside Hitter	1.78	22 August 1990 (age 35)
22	(United States) Annie Mitchem	Outside Hitter	1.92	22 April 1994 (age 32)

== 2018–19 ==
2018–2019 Team
Number	Player	Position	Height (m)	Birth date
1	(Poland) Malwina Smarzek	Opposite	1.91	3 June 1996 (age 30)
2	(Italy) Lucia Imperiali	Libero	1.62	5 May 1999 (age 27)
3	(Italy) Rossella Olivotto	Middle Blocker	1.89	27 April 1991 (age 35)
5	(Italy) Imma Sirressi	Libero	1.75	19 May 1990 (age 36)
6	(United States) Megan Courtney	Outside Hitter	1.85	27 October 1993 (age 32)
7	(United States) Hannah Tapp	Middle Blocker	1.88	21 June 1995 (age 31)
8	(Italy) Giulia Carraro	Setter	1.75	25 July 1994 (age 31)
9	(Italy) Camilla Mingardi	Opposite	1.86	19 October 1997 (age 28)
10	(Italy) Carlotta Cambi (c)	Setter	1.76	28 May 1996 (age 30)
17	(Italy) Sara Loda	Outside Hitter	1.78	22 August 1990 (age 35)
18	(Venezuela) Roslandy Acosta	Outside Hitter	1.90	25 February 1992 (age 34)
19	(Croatia) Ema Strunjak	Middle Blocker	1.87	24 September 1999 (age 26)

== 2017–18 ==
2017–2018 Team
Number	Player	Position	Height (m)	Birth date
1	(Croatia) Ema Strunjak	Middle Blocker	1.87	24 September 1999 (age 26)
2	(Italy) Lucia Imperiali	Libero	1.62	5 May 1999 (age 27)
3	(Serbia) Sanja Malagurski	Outside Hitter	1.93	8 June 1990 (age 36)
4	(Italy) Valeria Battista	Outside Hitter	1.79	23 January 2001 (age 25)
5	(Serbia) Mina Popović	Middle Blocker	1.87	16 September 1994 (age 31)
7	(Italy) Paola Cardullo	Libero	1.62	18 March 1982 (age 44)
9	(Italy) Francesca Marcon	Outside Hitter	1.80	9 July 1983 (age 42)
10	(Italy) Paola Paggi (c)	Middle Blocker	1.82	6 December 1976 (age 49)
13	(Italy) Jennifer Boldini	Setter	1.87	6 April 1999 (age 27)
15	(Italy) Ofelia Malinov	Setter	1.85	29 February 1996 (age 30)
17	(Italy) Miriam Sylla	Outside Hitter	1.81	8 January 1995 (age 31)
18	(Venezuela) Roslandy Acosta	Outside Hitter	1.90	25 February 1992 (age 34)

== 2016–17 ==
2016–2017 Team
Number	Player	Position	Height (m)	Weight (kg)	Birth date
1	(Slovenia) Eva Mori	Setter	1.86	70	13 March 1996 (age 30)
2	(Brazil) Suelen Pinto	Libero	1.68	89	4 October 1987 (age 38)
4	(Italy) Laura Partenio	Outside Hitter	1.82	68	29 December 1991 (age 34)
5	(Serbia) Mina Popović	Middle Blocker	1.87	73	16 September 1994 (age 31)
6	(Italy) Alessia Gennari	Outside Hitter	1.84	68	3 November 1991 (age 34)
7	(Italy) Paola Cardullo	Libero	1.62	56	18 March 1982 (age 44)
8	(Italy) Martina Guiggi	Middle Blocker	1.88	69	1 May 1984 (age 42)
9	(Italy) Anna Venturini	Outside Hitter	1.80	62	26 August 1998 (age 27)
10	(Italy) Paola Paggi	Middle Blocker	1.82	72	6 December 1976 (age 49)
14	(Italy) Eleonora Lo Bianco	Setter	1.74	71	22 December 1979 (age 46)
17	(Italy) Miriam Sylla	Outside Hitter	1.81	80	8 January 1995 (age 31)
18	(Poland) Katarzyna Skowrońska	Opposite	1.89	73	30 June 1983 (age 43)

== 2015–16 ==
2015–2016 Team
Number	Player	Position	Height (m)	Weight (kg)	Birth date
1	(Slovenia) Eva Mori	Setter	1.86	70	13 March 1996 (age 30)
4	(Netherlands) Celeste Plak	Outside Hitter	1.90	84	26 October 1995 (age 30)
5	(Italy) Laura Frigo	Middle Blocker	1.85	68	26 October 1990 (age 35)
6	(Italy) Alessia Gennari	Outside Hitter	1.84	68	3 November 1991 (age 34)
7	(Italy) Paola Cardullo	Libero	1.62	56	18 March 1982 (age 44)
9	(Belgium) Freya Aelbrecht	Middle Blocker	1.89	74	10 February 1990 (age 36)
10	(Italy) Paola Paggi	Middle Blocker	1.82	72	6 December 1976 (age 49)
13	(Croatia) Katarina Barun-Šušnjar	Opposite	1.94	75	1 December 1983 (age 42)
14	(Italy) Eleonora Lo Bianco	Setter	1.74	71	22 December 1979 (age 46)
15	(Serbia) Vesna Čitaković	Middle Blocker	1.87	75	3 February 1979 (age 47)
16	(Italy) Benedetta Mambelli	Outside Hitter	1.87	76	21 September 1995 (age 30)
17	(Italy) Miriam Sylla	Outside Hitter	1.81	80	8 January 1995 (age 31)

== 2014–15 ==
2014–2015 Team
Number	Player	Position	Height (m)	Weight (kg)	Birth date
1	(Slovenia) Eva Mori	Setter	1.86	70	13 March 1996 (age 30)
2	(United States) Alesha Deesing	Middle Blocker	1.86	71	10 September 1985 (age 40)
4	(Italy) Sara Loda	Outside Hitter	1.78	67	22 August 1990 (age 35)
5	(Italy) Paola Paggi	Middle Blocker	1.82	72	6 December 1976 (age 49)
7	(Serbia) Jelena Blagojević	Outside Hitter	1.81	70	1 December 1988 (age 37)
8	(Italy) Enrica Merlo	Libero	1.70	60	28 December 1988 (age 37)
9	(Italy) Laura Melandri	Middle Blocker	1.86	60	31 January 1995 (age 31)
10	(Poland) Milena Sadurek	Setter	1.78	61	18 October 1984 (age 41)
15	(Netherlands) Celeste Plak	Opposite	1.90	84	26 October 1995 (age 30)
16	(Italy) Benedetta Mambelli	Outside Hitter	1.87	76	21 September 1995 (age 30)
17	(Italy) Miriam Sylla	Outside Hitter	1.81	80	8 January 1995 (age 31)
18	(Italy) Federica Tasca	Middle Blocker	1.89	86	29 January 1989 (age 37)

== 2013–14 ==
2013–2014 Team
Number	Player	Position	Height (m)	Weight (kg)	Birth date
1	(Serbia) Sara Klisura	Outside Hitter	1.88	70	15 July 1992 (age 33)
2	(Italy) Federica Stufi	Middle Blocker	1.86	65	22 March 1988 (age 38)
3	(Italy) Eleonora Bruno	Libero	1.80	60	15 April 1994 (age 32)
4	(Italy) Sara Loda	Outside Hitter	1.78	67	22 August 1990 (age 35)
6	(Germany) Kathleen Weiß	Setter	1.71	66	2 February 1984 (age 42)
7	(Serbia) Jelena Blagojević	Outside Hitter	1.81	70	1 December 1988 (age 37)
8	(Italy) Enrica Merlo	Libero	1.70	60	28 December 1988 (age 37)
9	(Italy) Laura Melandri	Middle Blocker	1.86	60	31 January 1995 (age 31)
10	(Italy) Raphaela Folie	Middle Blocker	1.87	82	7 March 1991 (age 35)
13	(Italy) Valentina Diouf	Opposite	2.02	89	10 January 1993 (age 33)
16	(Czech Republic) Lucie Smutná	Setter	1.80	73	14 April 1991 (age 35)
17	(Italy) Miriam Sylla	Outside Hitter	1.81	80	8 January 1995 (age 31)

== 2012–13 ==
2012–2013 Team
Number	Player	Position	Height (m)	Weight (kg)	Birth date
1	(Serbia) Sara Klisura	Outside Hitter	1.88	70	15 July 1992 (age 33)
3	(Italy) Eleonora Bruno	Libero	1.80	60	15 April 1994 (age 32)
4	(United States) Alexis Crimes	Middle Blocker	1.91	68	12 June 1986 (age 40)
5	(United States) Blair Brown	Opposite	1.97	77	5 March 1988 (age 38)
6	(Germany) Kathleen Weiß	Setter	1.71	66	2 February 1984 (age 42)
7	(Serbia) Jelena Blagojević	Outside Hitter	1.81	70	1 December 1988 (age 37)
8	(Italy) Enrica Merlo	Libero	1.70	60	28 December 1988 (age 37)
9	(Italy) Chiara Di Iulio	Outside Hitter	1.84	65	5 May 1985 (age 41)
10	(Italy) Francesca Devetag	Middle Blocker	1.86	66	13 November 1986 (age 39)
13	(Italy) Valentina Diouf	Opposite	2.02	89	10 January 1993 (age 33)
15	(Italy) Martina Balboni	Setter	1.80	70	29 January 1991 (age 35)
18	(Italy) Marina Zambelli	Middle Blocker	1.87	74	1 January 1990 (age 36)

== 2011–12 ==
2011–2012 Team
Number	Player	Position	Height (m)	Weight (kg)	Birth date
2	(Romania) Iuliana Nucu	Middle Blocker	1.85	70	4 October 1980 (age 45)
3	(Italy) Noemi Signorile	Setter	1.83	74	15 February 1990 (age 36)
5	(Italy) Annamaria Quaranta	Outside Hitter	1.84	67	19 October 1981 (age 44)
6	(Italy) Angela Gabbiadini	Libero	1.81	68	12 May 1992 (age 34)
7	(Italy) Valentina Diouf	Opposite	2.02	89	10 January 1993 (age 33)
8	(Italy) Enrica Merlo	Libero	1.70	60	28 December 1988 (age 37)
9	(Italy) Chiara Di Iulio	Outside Hitter	1.84	65	5 May 1985 (age 41)
10	(Bulgaria) Hristina Ruseva	Middle Blocker	1.92	75	1 October 1991 (age 34)
12	(Italy) Francesca Piccinini	Outside Hitter	1.85	62	10 January 1979 (age 47)
13	(Italy) Valentina Arrighetti	Middle Blocker	1.87	73	26 January 1985 (age 41)
16	(Bulgaria) Elitsa Vasileva	Outside Hitter	1.94	75	13 May 1990 (age 36)
18	(Italy) Valentina Serena	Setter	1.84	76	10 November 1981 (age 44)

== 2010–11 ==
2010–2011 Team
Number	Player	Position	Height (m)	Weight (kg)	Birth date
1	(Italy) Serena Ortolani	Opposite	1.87	67	7 January 1987 (age 39)
2	(Romania) Iuliana Nucu	Middle Blocker	1.85	70	4 October 1980 (age 45)
3	(Italy) Noemi Signorile	Setter	1.83	74	15 February 1990 (age 36)
5	(Italy) Caterina Fanzini	Outside Hitter	1.86	69	12 August 1985 (age 40)
6	(Italy) Sara Carrara	Libero	1.68	60	1 December 1992 (age 33)
8	(Italy) Enrica Merlo	Libero	1.70	60	28 December 1988 (age 37)
9	(Italy) Lucia Bosetti	Outside Hitter	1.76	59	9 July 1989 (age 36)
12	(Italy) Francesca Piccinini	Outside Hitter	1.85	62	10 January 1979 (age 47)
13	(Italy) Valentina Arrighetti	Middle Blocker	1.87	73	26 January 1985 (age 41)
14	(Italy) Eleonora Lo Bianco	Setter	1.74	70	22 December 1979 (age 46)
16	(Bulgaria) Elitsa Vasileva	Outside Hitter	1.94	75	13 May 1990 (age 36)
18	(Italy) Marina Zambelli	Middle Blocker	1.87	74	1 January 1990 (age 36)

== 2009–10 ==
2009–2010 Team
Number	Player	Position	Height (m)	Weight (kg)	Birth date
1	(Italy) Serena Ortolani	Opposite	1.87	67	7 January 1987 (age 39)
3	(Italy) Caterina Fanzini	Outside Hitter	1.86	69	12 August 1985 (age 40)
4	(Italy) Valentina Serena	Setter	1.84	76	10 November 1981 (age 44)
5	(Poland) Katarzyna Gujska	Setter	1.79	69	15 February 1975 (age 51)
6	(Italy) Sara Carrara	Libero	1.68	60	1 December 1992 (age 33)
7	(Germany) Christiane Fürst	Middle Blocker	1.92	76	29 March 1985 (age 41)
8	(Italy) Enrica Merlo	Libero	1.70	60	28 December 1988 (age 37)
9	(Italy) Lucia Bosetti	Outside Hitter	1.76	59	9 July 1989 (age 36)
12	(Italy) Francesca Piccinini	Outside Hitter	1.85	62	10 January 1979 (age 47)
13	(Italy) Valentina Arrighetti	Middle Blocker	1.87	73	26 January 1985 (age 41)
14	(Italy) Eleonora Lo Bianco	Setter	1.74	70	22 December 1979 (age 46)
15	(Italy) Antonella Del Core	Outside Hitter	1.82	73	5 November 1980 (age 45)
18	(Italy) Marina Zambelli	Middle Blocker	1.87	74	1 January 1990 (age 36)

== 2008–09 ==
2008–2009 Team
Number	Player	Position	Height (m)	Weight (kg)	Birth date
1	(Italy) Serena Ortolani	Opposite	1.87	67	7 January 1987 (age 39)
2	(Italy) Enrica Merlo	Libero	1.70	60	28 December 1988 (age 37)
5	(Poland) Katarzyna Gujska	Setter	1.79	69	15 February 1975 (age 51)
6	(Japan) Erika Araki	Middle Blocker	1.86	79	3 August 1984 (age 41)
7	(Italy) Alessandra Camarda	Libero	1.74	67	5 August 1988 (age 37)
8	(Italy) Jenny Barazza	Middle Blocker	1.88	77	24 July 1981 (age 44)
9	(Italy) Indre Sorokaite	Opposite	1.88	84	7 July 1988 (age 38)
10	(Italy) Lucia Bacchi	Outside Hitter	1.81	69	4 January 1981 (age 45)
12	(Italy) Francesca Piccinini	Outside Hitter	1.85	62	10 January 1979 (age 47)
13	(Italy) Valentina Arrighetti	Middle Blocker	1.87	73	26 January 1985 (age 41)
14	(Italy) Eleonora Lo Bianco	Setter	1.74	70	22 December 1979 (age 46)
15	(Italy) Antonella Del Core	Outside Hitter	1.82	73	5 November 1980 (age 45)

== 2007–08 ==
2007–2008 Team
Number	Player	Position	Height (m)	Weight (kg)	Birth date
2	(Germany) Angelina Grün	Opposite	1.85	74	2 December 1979 (age 46)
3	(Italy) Paola Croce	Libero	1.68	52	6 March 1978 (age 48)
4	(Poland) Milena Rosner	Outside Hitter	1.80	65	1 April 1980 (age 46)
5	(Poland) Katarzyna Gujska	Setter	1.79	69	15 February 1975 (age 51)
6	(Italy) Jenny Barazza	Middle Blocker	1.88	77	24 July 1981 (age 44)
8	(Italy) Enrica Merlo	Libero	1.70	60	28 December 1988 (age 37)
9	(Italy) Indre Sorokaite	Opposite	1.88	84	7 July 1988 (age 38)
12	(Italy) Francesca Piccinini	Outside Hitter	1.85	62	10 January 1979 (age 47)
13	(Italy) Valentina Arrighetti	Middle Blocker	1.87	73	26 January 1985 (age 41)
14	(Italy) Eleonora Lo Bianco	Setter	1.74	70	22 December 1979 (age 46)
15	(Italy) Valentina Fiorin	Outside Hitter	1.87	69	9 October 1984 (age 41)
18	(Croatia) Maja Poljak	Middle Blocker	1.94	73	2 May 1983 (age 43)

== 2006–07 ==
2006–2007 Team
Number	Player	Position	Height (m)	Weight (kg)	Birth date
1	(Italy) Serena Ortolani	Opposite	1.87	67	7 January 1987 (age 39)
2	(Germany) Angelina Grün	Outside Hitter	1.85	74	2 December 1979 (age 46)
3	(Italy) Paola Croce	Libero	1.68	52	6 March 1978 (age 48)
5	(Poland) Katarzyna Gujska	Setter	1.79	69	15 February 1975 (age 51)
6	(Italy) Jenny Barazza	Middle Blocker	1.88	77	24 July 1981 (age 44)
7	(Croatia) Katarina Barun	Opposite	1.94	75	1 December 1983 (age 42)
8	(Italy) Manuela Secolo	Outside Hitter	1.80	70	22 February 1977 (age 49)
9	(Italy) Indre Sorokaite	Opposite	1.88	84	7 July 1988 (age 38)
10	(Italy) Paola Paggi	Middle Blocker	1.82	72	6 December 1976 (age 49)
12	(Italy) Francesca Piccinini	Outside Hitter	1.85	62	10 January 1979 (age 47)
14	(Italy) Eleonora Lo Bianco	Setter	1.74	70	22 December 1979 (age 46)
18	(Croatia) Maja Poljak	Middle Blocker	1.94	73	2 May 1983 (age 43)

== 2005–06 ==
2005–2006 Team
Number	Player	Position	Height (m)	Weight (kg)	Birth date
1	(Italy) Serena Ortolani	Opposite	1.87	67	7 January 1987 (age 39)
2	(Germany) Angelina Grün	Outside Hitter	1.85	74	2 December 1979 (age 46)
3	(Italy) Paola Croce	Libero	1.68	52	6 March 1978 (age 48)
5	(Poland) Katarzyna Gujska	Setter	1.79	69	15 February 1975 (age 51)
6	(Italy) Jenny Barazza	Middle Blocker	1.88	77	24 July 1981 (age 44)
8	(Italy) Manuela Secolo	Outside Hitter	1.80	70	22 February 1977 (age 49)
9	(Finland) Riikka Lehtonen	Outside Hitter	1.83	71	24 July 1979 (age 46)
10	(Italy) Paola Paggi	Middle Blocker	1.82	72	6 December 1976 (age 49)
12	(Italy) Francesca Piccinini	Outside Hitter	1.85	62	10 January 1979 (age 47)
14	(Italy) Eleonora Lo Bianco	Setter	1.74	70	22 December 1979 (age 46)
18	(Croatia) Maja Poljak	Middle Blocker	1.94	73	2 May 1983 (age 43)

== 2004–05 ==
2004–2005 Team
Number	Player	Position	Height (m)	Weight (kg)	Birth date
1	(Italy) Serena Ortolani	Opposite	1.87	67	7 January 1987 (age 39)
2	(Germany) Angelina Grün	Opposite	1.85	74	2 December 1979 (age 46)
3	(Italy) Paola Croce	Libero	1.68	52	6 March 1978 (age 48)
4	(Croatia) Iskra Mijalić	Opposite	1.96	77	15 February 1975 (age 51)
5	(Russia) Lioubov Sokolova	Outside Hitter	1.92	73	4 December 1977 (age 48)
6	(Italy) Jenny Barazza	Middle Blocker	1.88	77	24 July 1981 (age 44)
7	(Ukraine) Iryna Zhukova	Setter	1.79	70	22 November 1974 (age 51)
8	(Italy) Manuela Secolo	Outside Hitter	1.80	70	22 February 1977 (age 49)
10	(Italy) Paola Paggi	Middle Blocker	1.82	72	6 December 1976 (age 49)
12	(Italy) Francesca Piccinini	Outside Hitter	1.85	62	10 January 1979 (age 47)
13	(Italy) Katja Luraschi	Setter	1.87	60	6 January 1986 (age 40)
18	(Croatia) Maja Poljak	Middle Blocker	1.94	73	2 May 1983 (age 43)

== 2003–04 ==
2003–2004 Team
Number	Player	Position	Height (m)	Weight (kg)	Birth date
1	(Italy) Giorgia Baldelli	Outside Hitter	1.78	64	10 March 1985 (age 41)
2	(Germany) Angelina Grün	Opposite	1.85	74	2 December 1979 (age 46)
3	(Ukraine) Tatiana Voronina	Outside Hitter	1.87	74	20 September 1977 (age 48)
4	(Poland) Katarzyna Gujska	Setter	1.79	69	15 February 1975 (age 51)
5	(Russia) Lioubov Sokolova	Outside Hitter	1.92	73	4 December 1977 (age 48)
6	(Italy) Jenny Barazza	Middle Blocker	1.88	77	24 July 1981 (age 44)
7	(Ukraine) Iryna Zhukova	Setter	1.79	70	22 November 1974 (age 51)
8	(Italy) Manuela Secolo	Outside Hitter	1.80	70	22 February 1977 (age 49)
9	(China) Li Yan	Libero	1.78	62	1 May 1976 (age 50)
10	(Italy) Paola Paggi	Middle Blocker	1.82	72	6 December 1976 (age 49)
12	(Italy) Francesca Piccinini	Outside Hitter	1.85	62	10 January 1979 (age 47)
18	(Croatia) Maja Poljak	Middle Blocker	1.94	73	2 May 1983 (age 43)

== 2002–03 ==
2002–2003 Team
Number	Player	Position	Height (m)	Weight (kg)	Birth date
1	(Italy) Giorgia Baldelli	Outside Hitter	1.78	64	10 March 1985 (age 41)
2	(Croatia) Dragana Marinković	Middle Blocker	1.97	75	19 October 1982 (age 43)
4	(Poland) Katarzyna Gujska	Setter	1.79	69	15 February 1975 (age 51)
5	(Russia) Lioubov Sokolova	Outside Hitter	1.92	73	4 December 1977 (age 48)
6	(Romania) Carmen Țurlea	Opposite	1.85	69	18 November 1975 (age 50)
7	(Italy) Maurizia Cacciatori	Setter	1.79	65	6 April 1973 (age 53)
8	(Italy) Vania Beriola	Libero	1.77	64	24 February 1974 (age 52)
9	(United States) Heather Bown	Middle Blocker	1.91	90	29 November 1978 (age 47)
10	(Italy) Paola Paggi	Middle Blocker	1.82	72	6 December 1976 (age 49)
12	(Italy) Francesca Piccinini	Outside Hitter	1.85	62	10 January 1979 (age 47)
15	(Serbia) Jelena Nikolić	Outside Hitter	1.94	78	13 April 1982 (age 44)
