= Volleyball at the 2018 Mediterranean Games – Women's team rosters =

This article shows the rosters of all participating teams at the women's indoor volleyball tournament at the 2018 Mediterranean Games in Tarragona.

== Group A ==
=== Greece ===
The following is the Greek roster in the 2018 Mediterranean Games.

- Head coach: Guillermo Naranjo Hernandez

No.	Name	Date of birth	Height	Weight	2018 club
1	Katerina Giota	3 July 1990 (aged 27)	1.84 m (6 ft 0 in)	74 kg (163 lb)	
2	Maria Eleni Artakianou	21 May 1994 (aged 24)	1.70 m (5 ft 7 in)	62 kg (137 lb)	
6	Panagiota Dioti	13 November 1992 (aged 25)	1.86 m (6 ft 1 in)	68 kg (150 lb)	
7	Tzina Lamprousi	27 January 1993 (aged 25)	1.85 m (6 ft 1 in)	65 kg (143 lb)	
9	Olga Strantzali	12 January 1996 (aged 22)	1.85 m (6 ft 1 in)	70 kg (150 lb)	
10	Evangelia Merteki	29 April 1991 (aged 27)	1.90 m (6 ft 3 in)	73 kg (161 lb)	
11	Anthi Vasilantonaki	9 April 1996 (aged 22)	1.95 m (6 ft 5 in)	78 kg (172 lb)	
13	Athanasia Totsidou	18 June 1989 (aged 29)	1.78 m (5 ft 10 in)	64 kg (141 lb)	
14	Stella Christodoulou	19 July 1991 (aged 26)	1.85 m (6 ft 1 in)	82 kg (181 lb)	
15	Eirini Chatziefstratiadou	2 September 1995 (aged 22)	1.84 m (6 ft 0 in)	79 kg (174 lb)	
16	Maria Genitsaridi	3 June 1994 (aged 24)	1.85 m (6 ft 1 in)	86 kg (190 lb)	
17	Lamprini Konstantinidou	16 September 1996 (aged 21)	1.85 m (6 ft 1 in)	80 kg (180 lb)	

=== Italy ===
The following is the Italian roster in the 2018 Mediterranean Games.

- Head coach: Massimo Bellano

No.	Name	Date of birth	Height	Weight	2018 club
1	Valeria Battista	23 January 2001 (aged 17)	1.80 m (5 ft 11 in)	71 kg (157 lb)	
2	Alice Degradi	10 April 1996 (aged 22)	1.77 m (5 ft 10 in)	65 kg (143 lb)	
3	Rossella Olivotto	27 April 1991 (aged 27)	1.80 m (5 ft 11 in)	68 kg (150 lb)	
4	Rachele Morello	7 November 2000 (aged 17)	1.80 m (5 ft 11 in)	65 kg (143 lb)	
5	Ilaria Spirito	20 February 1994 (aged 24)	1.74 m (5 ft 9 in)	60 kg (130 lb)	
6	Sofia D'Odorico	6 January 1997 (aged 21)	1.86 m (6 ft 1 in)	72 kg (159 lb)	
7	Isabella Di Iulio	26 November 1991 (aged 26)	1.80 m (5 ft 11 in)	70 kg (150 lb)	
9	Camilla Mingardi	19 October 1997 (aged 20)	1.79 m (5 ft 10 in)	71 kg (157 lb)	
13	Alessia Populini	10 September 2000 (aged 17)	1.72 m (5 ft 8 in)	63 kg (139 lb)	
14	Alexandra Botezat	3 August 1998 (aged 19)	1.76 m (5 ft 9 in)	63 kg (139 lb)	
15	Beatrice Berti	12 January 1996 (aged 22)	1.93 m (6 ft 4 in)	78 kg (172 lb)	
16	Anna Nicoletti	3 January 1996 (aged 22)	1.88 m (6 ft 2 in)	78 kg (172 lb)	

== Group C ==
=== Croatia ===
The following is the Croatian roster in the 2018 Mediterranean Games.

- Head coach: Frane Žanić

No.	Name	Date of birth	Height	Weight	2018 club
1	Rene Sain	23 April 1997 (aged 21)	1.63 m (5 ft 4 in)	54 kg (119 lb)	(Czech Republic) VK UP Olomouc
3	Elena Vukić	10 December 1991 (aged 26)	1.89 m (6 ft 2 in)	79 kg (174 lb)	(Croatia) OK Kaštela
4	Božana Butigan	19 August 2000 (aged 17)	1.89 m (6 ft 2 in)	75 kg (165 lb)	(Croatia) HAOK Mladost
5	Nikolina Božičević	14 January 1995 (aged 23)	1.63 m (5 ft 4 in)	54 kg (119 lb)	(Croatia) OK Kaštela
8	Antonia Volmut	13 April 1996 (aged 22)	1.82 m (6 ft 0 in)	74 kg (163 lb)	(Croatia) HAOK Mladost
11	Sanja Popović	31 May 1984 (aged 34)	1.86 m (6 ft 1 in)	84 kg (185 lb)	(Turkey) Samsun BŞB Anakent
12	Beta Dumančić	26 March 1991 (aged 27)	1.90 m (6 ft 3 in)	80 kg (180 lb)	(Germany) Schweriner SC
13	Samanta Fabris	8 February 1992 (aged 26)	1.90 m (6 ft 3 in)	80 kg (180 lb)	(Italy) Imoco Volley
14	Martina Šamadan	11 September 1993 (aged 24)	1.93 m (6 ft 4 in)	80 kg (180 lb)	(Croatia) HAOK Mladost
15	Bernarda Brčić	12 May 1991 (aged 27)	1.92 m (6 ft 4 in)	78 kg (172 lb)	(Slovenia) OK Kamnik
16	Vedrana Jakšetić	17 September 1996 (aged 21)	1.85 m (6 ft 1 in)	74 kg (163 lb)	(France) RC Cannes
18	Dinka Kulić	2 August 1997 (aged 20)	1.88 m (6 ft 2 in)	78 kg (172 lb)	(Croatia) HAOK Mladost
