= Former Volley Pesaro squads =

This article shows All past squads from the Italian professional volleyball team Volley Pesaro from the Serie A League.

== 2017–18 ==
Season 2017–2018, as of September 2017.

Number	Player	Position	Height (m)	Weight (kg)	Birth date
1	(Montenegro) Tatjana Bokan	Outside hitter	1.86	72	9 April 1988 (age 38)
2	(Italy) Carlotta Cambi	Setter	1.76	66	28 May 1996 (age 30)
3	(Italy) Rossella Olivotto	Middle blocker	1.84		27 April 1991 (age 35)
5	(Argentina) Yamila Nizetich	Outside hitter	1.83	76	27 January 1989 (age 37)
7	(Italy) Alessia Ghilardi	Libero	1.63		5 May 1979 (age 47)
8	(Italy) Silvia Bussoli	Outside hitter	1.83		22 November 1993 (age 32)
9	(Belgium) Freya Aelbrecht	Middle blocker	1.89	74	10 February 1990 (age 36)
10	(Belgium) Lise Van Hecke	Opposite	1.92	70	1 July 1992 (age 33)
11	(Italy) Gloria Baldi	Opposite	1.85		31 May 1993 (age 33)
12	(Italy) Giulia Carraro	Setter	1.75	65	25 July 1994 (age 31)
16	(Italy) Alessia Arciprete	Outside hitter	1.80		6 September 1997 (age 28)
18	(Italy) Chiara Lapi	Middle blocker	1.82		3 March 1991 (age 35)

== 2016–17 ==
2016–2017 Team
Number	Player	Position	Height (m)	Weight (kg)	Birth date
1	(Italy) Federica Mastrodicasa	Middle blocker	1.82		5 February 1988 (age 38)
2	(Italy) Alice Dagradi	Outside hitter	1.81	75	10 April 1996 (age 30)
3	(Italy) Rossella Olivotto	Middle blocker	1.84		27 April 1991 (age 35)
4	(Italy) Alessia Ghilardi	Libero	1.63		5 May 1979 (age 47)
5	(Italy) Nicole Gamba	Libero	1.70		2 June 1998 (age 28)
6	(Greece) Eleni Kiosi	Outside hitter	1.85	69	27 February 1985 (age 41)
7	(Italy) Isabella Di Iulio	Setter	1.75		26 November 1991 (age 34)
8	(Italy) Silvia Bussoli	Outside hitter	1.83		22 November 1993 (age 32)
9	(Italy) Alice Santini	Outside hitter	1.81	68	16 January 1984 (age 42)
10	(Italy) Alice Pamio	Outside hitter	1.79	66	15 January 1998 (age 28)
11	(Italy) Rebecca Rimoldi	Setter	1.75		25 May 1998 (age 28)
13	(Italy) Viola Tonello	Middle blocker	1.84		3 January 1994 (age 32)
Coach: (Italy) Matteo Bertini

== 2010–11 ==
2010–2011 Team
Number	Player	Position	Height (m)	Birth date
1	(Croatia) Senna Usić	Outside hitter	1.90	15/05/1986
3	(Italy) Rossella Olivotto	Middle blocker	1.84	27/04/1991
5	(Italy) Francesca Mari	Setter	1.82	30/03/1983
7	(Italy) Monnica De Gennaro	Libero	1.73	08/01/1987
8	(Italy) Laura Saccomani	Outside hitter	1.91	08/10/1991
9	(Italy) Elisa Manzano	Middle blocker	1.87	18/01/1985
10	(Italy) Francesca Ferretti	Setter	1.80	15/02/1984
11	(Italy) Martina Boscoscuro	Libero	1.65	02/09/1988
12	(Netherlands) Manon Flier	Opposite	1.92	08/02/1984
13	(Croatia) Marija Usić	Outside hitter	1.84	05/02/1992
14	(Italy) Martina Guiggi	Middle blocker	1.83	01/05/1984
16	(Italy) Giulia Pascutti	Outside hitter	1.88	29/09/1993
17	(Azerbaijan) Natavan Gasimova	Setter	1.78	08/07/1985
18	(United States) Destinee Hooker	Outside hitter	1.93	07/10/1987
Coach: (Italy) Paolo Tofoli

== 2009–10 ==
2009–2010 Team
Number	Player	Position	Height (m)	Birth date
1	(Croatia) Senna Usic	Wing spiker	1.90	15/05/1986
3	(Italy) Ilaria Garzaro	Middle blocker	1.89	29/09/1986
5	(Italy) Francesca Mari	Setter	1.82	30/03/1983
6	(Netherlands) Elke Wijnhoven	Libero	1.70	03/01/1981
7	(Poland) Katarzyna Skowronska	Opposite	1.87	30/06/1983
8	(Italy) Laura Saccomani	Wing spiker	1.91	08/10/1991
9	(Serbia) Dragana Marinkovic	Middle blocker / Outside Hitter	1.96	19/10/1982
10	(Italy) Francesca Ferretti	Setter	1.80	15/02/1984
11	(Italy) Martina Boscoscuro	Libero	1.65	02/09/1988
12	(Italy) Carolina Costagrande	Wing spiker	1.86	15/10/1980
13	(Croatia) Marija Usic	Wing spiker	1.84	05/02/1992
14	(Italy) Martina Guiggi	Middle blocker	1.83	01/05/1984
Coach: (Brazil) Angelo Vercesi
