= Volleyball at the 2025 Summer World University Games =

Volleyball at the Universiade
- Venue: various
- Dates: July 16, 2025 – July 24, 2025
- Teams: 15 (men) and 16 (women)

Volleyball at the 2025 Summer World University Games in Berlin was played between July 16 and July 24, 2025. A total of 31 volleyball teams participated in the tournament.

== Qualification ==
Following the current FISU regulations, The maximum of 16 teams in 2 volleyball events where the number of entries is larger than the authorised participation level will be selected by

- The entry and the payment of guarantee.
- "A change compared to the previous edition is that, in both the men's and women's tournaments, the top 8 teams from the previous edition automatically qualify for this edition. However, if any team withdraws, the next best-ranked team from the previous edition will be invited to take the spot.
- As four teams finishing in the bottom rankings of the previous edition will be replaced by new four applying teams.

This rule, which was not applied in the last edition due to the COVID-19 pandemic, returns to be in effect starting from this edition.If a team with a better FIVB ranking is among the challengers, a fifth team may be relegated.

- The host country is always automatically qualified.
- If there are remaining spots, FISU may invite additional teams, taking into account criteria such as geographical representation, continental diversity, and FIVB rankings.

=== Qualified teams ===
==== Men's competition ====
Means of qualification	Date	Venue	Vacancies	Qualified
Host country	—	—	1	Germany
Top nine of previous edition	July 29 to August 7, 2023	(China) Chengdu	8	Italy; Poland; ~~China~~; ~~Iran~~; Argentina; Portugal; South Korea; Brazil; ~~Ukraine~~
Continental Quotas	—	—	4	Australia; Czech Republic; Japan; United States; Chinese Taipei
Wild Cards	—	—	3	Colombia; Chile; Philippines
Total				15

==== Women's competition ====
Means of qualification	Date	Venue	Vacancies	Qualified
Host country	—	—	1	Germany
Top 8 of previous edition	30 July – 6 August	(China) Chengdu	8	China; Japan; Poland; Brazil; Italy; Czech Republic; Chinese Taipei; Argentina; ~~Hong Kong~~; ~~Colombia~~
Continental Quotas	—	—	5	Australia; Chile; Mongolia; France; United States
Wildcards	—	—	2	Spain; India
Total			16	

== Draw ==
The draw was held in April 2025 at the Airship Hangar Mülheim.

=== Men's competition ===
Pool A	Pool B	Pool C	Pool D
Portugal	Japan	Poland	Germany
Brazil	Czech Republic	Argentina	Italy
Chinese Taipei	Chile	Colombia	South Korea
Australia		Philippines	United States

=== Women's competition ===
Pool A	Pool B	Pool C	Pool D
Germany	Japan	Poland	Italy
China	Czech Republic	Brazil	Chinese Taipei
Argentina	France	India	United States
Mongolia	Chile	Spain	Australia

== Medal table ==
* Host nation (Germany)

Rank	Nation	Gold	Silver	Bronze	Total
1	Italy	1	0	1	2
2	Poland	1	0	0	1
3	Brazil	0	1	1	2
4	Japan	0	1	0	1
Totals (4 entries)		2	2	2	6

== Medal summary ==
=== Medal events ===
Event	Gold	Silver	Bronze
Men	Poland; Seweryn Lipiński; Daniel Popiela; Dawid Pawlun; Aliaksei Nasevich; Remigiusz Kapica; Piotr Śliwka; Maciej Czyrek; Kajetan Kubicki; Jordan Zaleszczyk; Michał Gierżot; Marcel Hendzelewski; Antoni Kwasigroch	Brazil; Samuel Neufeld; Gabriel Ostapechen; Guilherme Souza; Luiz Ricardo da Silva; Gabriel Bieler; Geovane Kuhnen; Leonardo Lukas Leodolter; Guilherme Alexandre; Gustavo Cardoso; Matheus Pedrosa; Paulo Vinicios da Silva; Pietro Santos	Italy; Damiano Catania; Giulio Magalini; Tommaso Guzzo; Nicola Cianciotta; Tommaso Barotto; Francesco Sani; Alessandro Fanizza; Francesco Comparoni; Mattia Orioli; Andrea Truocchio; Federico Crosato; Mattia Bonifante
Women	Italy; Benedetta Sartori; Giorgia Frosini; Beatrice Gardini; Chidera Eze; Oghosasere Omoruyi; Martina Armini; Alice Nardo; Katja Eckl; Alice Tanase; Adhuoljok Malual; Rachele Morello; Matilde Munarini	Japan; Ameze Miyabe; Haruka Oyama; Saki Ishikura; Rina Yamaji; Natsumi Kodama; Rin Honda; Emili Iiyama; Ayaka Sato; Rino Takizawa; Akane Abe; Niina Kumagai; Satsuki Nakagawa	Brazil; Ana Luiza Bento; Mariana Brambilla; Rosely Nogueira; Sabrina Groth; Kenya Malachias; Camila Mesquita; Larissa Besen; Carolina Grossi; Geovanna Rodrigues; Kelly de Souza; Lanna Machado; Emanuelle de Moura
