= Francesco Sani =

Italian-American volleyball player (born 2002)

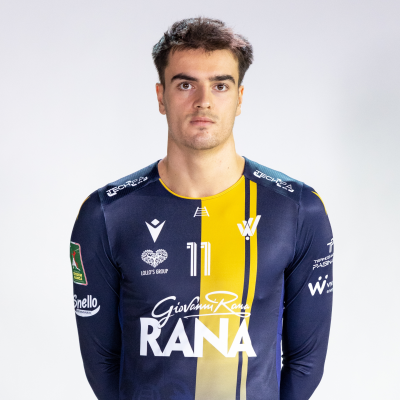

Personal information
- Nationality: American, Italian
- Born: 16 July 2002 (age 24); Greenbrae, California, U.S.
- Height: 2.03 m (6 ft 8 in)
- Education: UC Irvine

Volleyball information
- Position: Outside hitter
- Current team: Verona
- Number: 11

Career
| Years | Teams |
|---|---|
| 2023– | Verona |

National team
| 2019 | United States U-19 |
| 2021–2022 | United States |
| 2025– | Italy |
Honours
Men's volleyball
Representing United States
Pan American Cup
| Bronze medal – third place | 2022 Gatineau |
Representing Italy
FIVB World Championship
| Gold medal – first place | 2025 Philippines |
World University Games
| Bronze medal – third place | 2025 Rhine-Ruhr | Team |

Francesco Sani (born 16 July 2002) is a professional volleyball player who plays as an outside hitter for the Italian Volleyball League club, Verona. Born in the United States, he represents Italy at the international level. He was a member of his country of birth's national team from 2021 to 2022.

== Career ==
=== Youth and college ===
Sani began his club career with The St. James, while at school level he played in the Maryland tournaments with Walter Johnson High School. After graduating he landed in the NCAA Division I university league with UC Irvine, where he played from 2020 to 2023, also being included in the second All-America team.

=== Club ===
In the 2023–24 season, Sani signed his first professional contract in Italy, where he participated in the Italian Volleyball League with Verona, being registered as an Italian.

=== National team ===
Sani was called up to the US under 19 national team to play in the 2019 World Championship.

In 2021, Sani made his debut for the senior American national team at the NORCECA Final Six, where he won the bronze medal. A year later, he won two more bronzes, again at the NORCECA Final Six and then at the Pan American Cup.

In 2025, after having switched his sporting nationality, Sani made his debut with the Italian national team, winning the bronze medal at the Summer World University Games in the same year.
