= Davide Mazzanti =

Italian volleyball coach (born 1976)

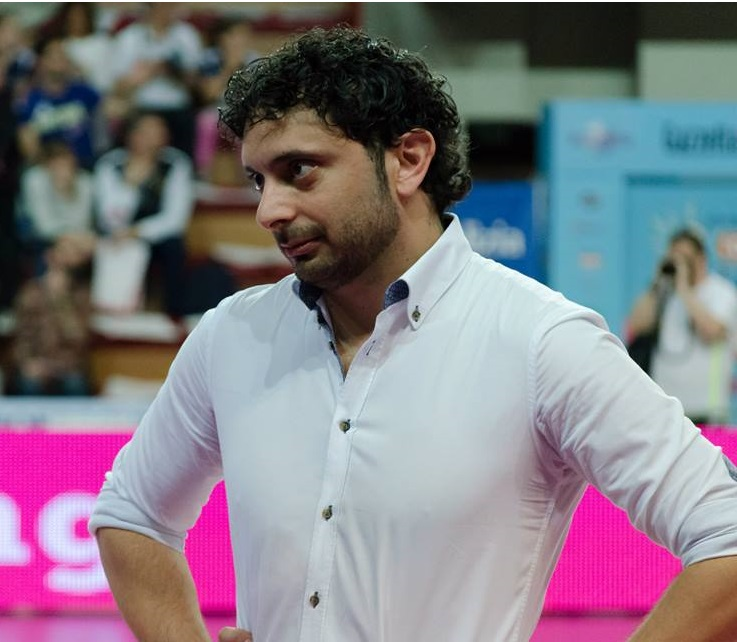

Davide Mazzanti (born 15 October 1976 in Fano, Italy) is an Italian volleyball coach of the Italian national team, which he coached at the 2017 Women's European Volleyball Championship as well as the 2019 edition.
