= Ameze Miyabe =

Japanese volleyball player (born 2001)

Personal information
- Full name: Ameze Miyabe
- Nationality: Japanese
- Born: 12 October 2001 (age 25); Amagasaki City, Hyogo, Japan
- Height: 1.73 m (5 ft 8 in)
- Weight: 61 kg (134 lb)
- Spike: 303 cm (119 in)
- Block: 270 cm (106 in)
- Education: Tokai University

Volleyball information
- Position: Outside hitter
- Current club: (Japan) Osaka Marvelous
- Number: 25 (national); 15 (club)

Career
Years	Teams
2017–2020; 2020–2024; 2024-present	(Japan) Kinrankai High School (Japan) Tokai University (Japan) Osaka Marvelous

National team
2017–	Japan
Honours
Women's volleyball
Representing Japan
FISU World University Games
Silver medal – second place	2025 Berlin	Team
Silver medal – second place	2021 Chengdu	Team
U20 World Championship
Gold medal – first place	2019 Mexico	team
Asian U18 Championship
Gold medal – first place	2017 Chongqing	team

Ameze Miyabe (宮部 愛芽世, Miyabe Ameze; born 12 October 2001) is a Japanese professional volleyball player. She plays in the SV.League for Osaka Marvelous.

== Personal life ==
Ameze's older sister, Airi Miyabe is also a volleyball player. Both sisters have played in the SV.League. She has Nigerian father and Japanese mother.

== Career ==
=== Early Years ===
In her high school years, Ameze contributed to the team's consecutive victories in the 70th and 71st All Japan High School Championship (Haruko). Although they missed out on the third consecutive victory, they finished at the third place in the 72nd tournament.

In 2019, she was selected for the U20 World Championship in Mexico where the team won the championship.

She then enrolled at Tokai University. In 2023, she represented Japan at the V. Summer League as a member of the Women's Universiade team. She contributed to the team's victory and was named as the MVP. In the same year, she was selected to represent Japan at the 2021 FISU World University Games in Chengdu where the team won silver medal. She also contributed to Tokai University's runner-up finish at the All Japan Intercollegiate Championship where they missed out on their third consecutive victory. She won the Fighting Spirit Award.

In 2025, she was selected to represent Japan at the 2025 FISU World University Games in Berlin where the team won a silver medal for consecutive time.

=== Professional Years ===
For the 2023–24 season, Ameze was selected as a prospective player for JT Marvelous (now Osaka Marvelous).

In May 2025, she made her debut in the Japan Beach Volleyball Tour 2025's second leg as a pair with Wakana Akishige, her junior from Kinrankai Junior and Senior High School.

== Award ==
=== Individual ===
- 2018-19 All Japan High School Championship - Best Outside Hitter, MVP
- 2019-20 All Japan High School Championship - Best Opposite
- 2021-22 All Japan Intercollegiate Championship - Best Spiker, Best Scorer
- 2022-23 All Japan Intercollegiate Championship - Best Blocker
- 2023 V.Summer League - MVP
- 2023-24 Kanto University Autumn League - Best Scorer
- 2025 FISU World University Games - Best Outside Hitter

=== High School Team ===
- 2017-18 All Japan High School Championship - - Champion, with Kinrankai High School
- 2018-19 All Japan High School Championship - - Champion, with Kinrankai High School
- 2019-20 All Japan High School Championship - - Bronze Medal, with Kinrankai High School

=== University Team ===
- 2020-21 All Japan Intercollegiate Championship - - Runner-up, with Tokai University
- 2021-22 Kurowashiki All Japan Volleyball Tournament - - Bronze Medal, with Tokai University
- 2021-22 All Japan Intercollegiate Championship - - Champion, with Tokai University
- 2021-22 Kanto University Autumn League - - Runner-up, with Tokai University
- 2022-23 All Japan Intercollegiate Championship - - Champion, with Tokai University
- 2022-23 Kanto University Autumn League - Champion, with Tokai University
- 2022 23 Kanto University Spring League - - Champion, with Tokai University
- 2022-23 East Japan Intercollegiate Championship - - Champion, with Tokai University
- 2023-24 All Japan Intercollegiate Championship - - Runner-up, with Tokai University
- 2023-24 Kanto University Autumn League - - Bronze Medal, with Tokai University
- 2023-24 Kanto University Spring League - - Bronze Medal, with Tokai University

=== Club Team ===
- 2023-24 Empress' Cup All Japan Volleyball Championship - - Bronze Medal, with JT Marvelous
- 2023-24 V.League Division 1 Women's - - Runner-up, with JT Marvelous
- 2024-25 Empress' Cup All Japan Volleyball Championship - - Bronze Medal, with Osaka Marvelous
- 2024–25 SV.League Women's - - Champion, with Osaka Marvelous
- 2025-26 Empress' Cup All Japan Volleyball Championship - - Champion, with Osaka Marvelous

=== National Team ===
- (China) 2017 Asian Girls' U18 Volleyball Championship - - Champion
- (Mexico) 2019 FIVB Volleyball Women's U20 World Championship - - Champion
- (China) 2021 FISU World University Games - - Runner-up
- (Germany) 2025 FISU World University Games - - Runner-up
