= Chiara Dall'Ora =

Italian volleyball player (born 1983)

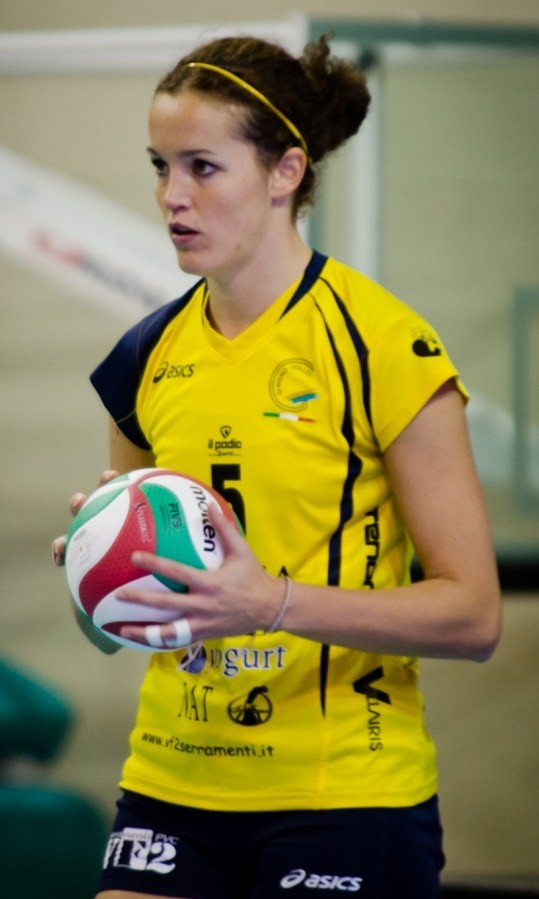

Personal information
- Nationality: Italian
- Born: 11 January 1983 (age 43)

Volleyball information
- Position: middle blocker
- Number: 5 (national team)

Career
| Years | Teams |
|---|---|
| 2005 | (Italy) VC Padova |

National team
| 2005 | Italy |

Chiara Dall'Ora (born 11 January 1983) is a retired Italian female volleyball player, playing as a middle blocker. She was part of the Italy women's national volleyball team.

She won the bronze medal at the 2005 Mediterranean Games. On club level she played for VC Padova in 2005.
