= Manuela Secolo =

Italian volleyball player (born 1977)

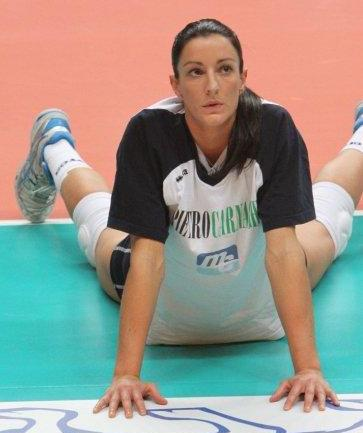

Personal information
- Nationality: Italian
- Born: 22 February 1977 (age 49)
- Height: 1.80 m (5 ft 11 in)
- Weight: 70 kg (154 lb)
- Spike: 302 cm (119 in)
- Block: 279 cm (110 in)

National team
Italy
Medal record
Women's volleyball
Representing Italy
Mediterranean Games
Gold medal – first place	2009 Pescara	Team

Manuela Secolo (born 22 February 1977) is an Italian female volleyball player. She was part of the Italy women's national volleyball team. She competed with the national team at the 2004 Summer Olympics in Athens, Greece.

== See also ==
- Italy at the 2004 Summer Olympics
