= Floortje Meijners =

Dutch volleyball player (born 1987)

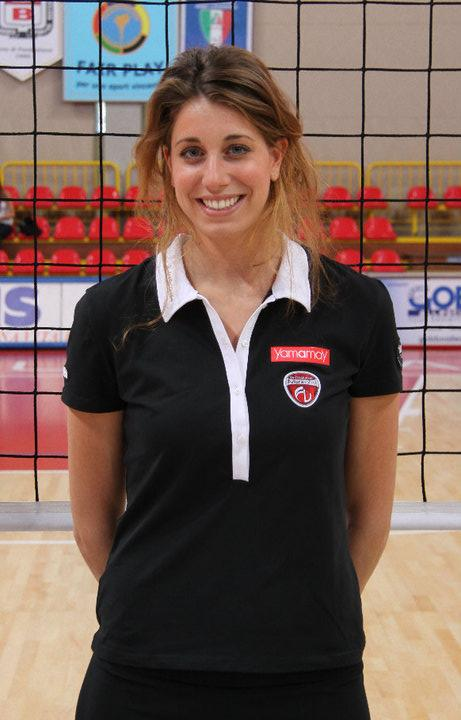

Medal record

Women's volleyball

Representing the Netherlands

FIVB World Grand Prix
Gold medal – first place	2007 Ningbo	Team competition

Floortje Meijners (born 16 January 1987 in Oldenzaal, Overijssel) is a volleyball player from the Netherlands, who plays as a wing-spiker. She was a member of the Dutch National Women's Team that won the gold medal at the FIVB World Grand Prix 2007 in Ningbo, PR China.

Starting from 2010, she played in Italy at Busto Arsizio, where she remained until 2012, when she moved to River Volley Piacenza. After one year at Turkish team Galatasaray Daikin Istanbul (2014–2015), she is now playing again for the Italian team Nordmeccanica Piacenza.
