= Celeste Poma =

Italian volleyball player (born 1991)

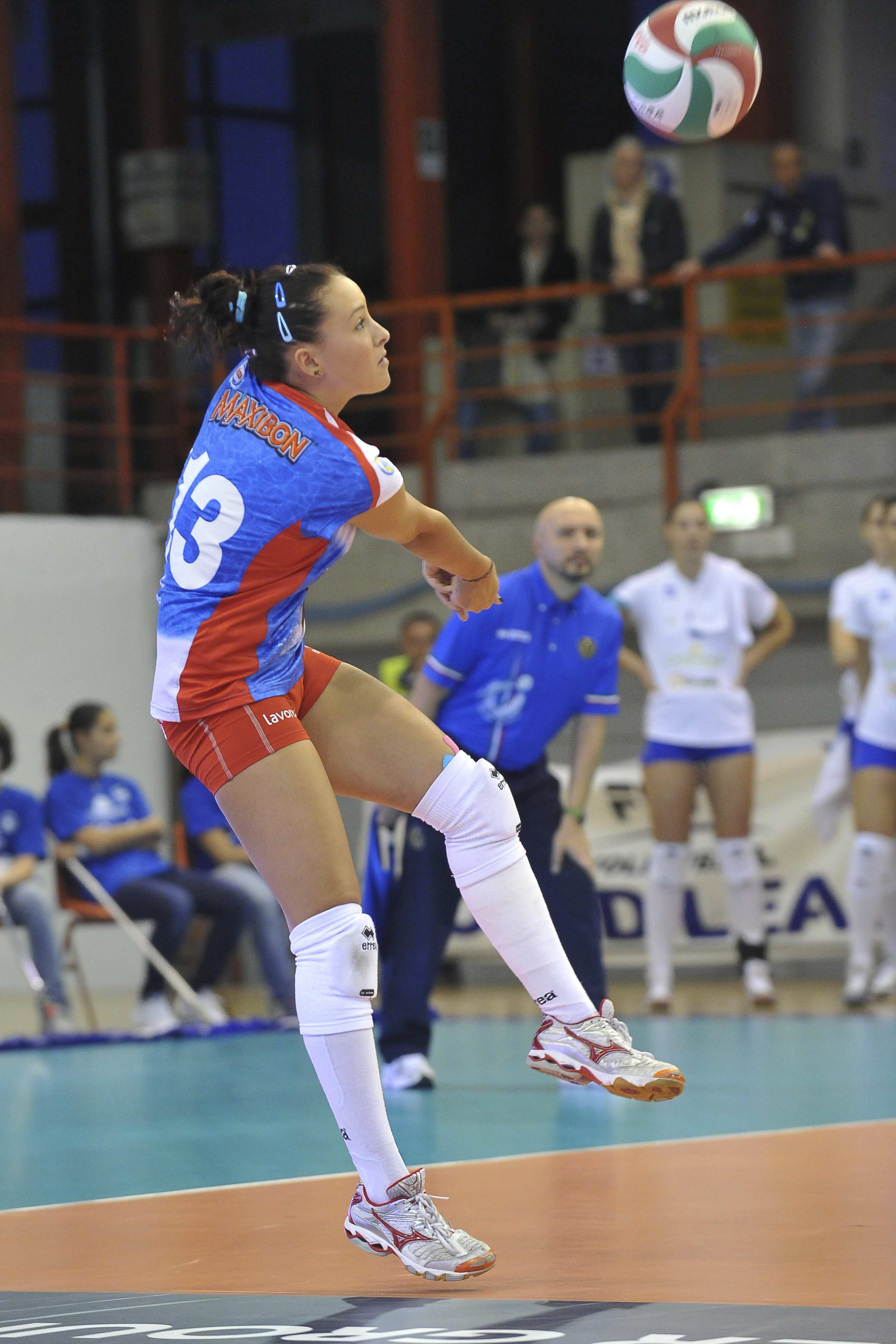

Personal information
- Nationality: Italian
- Born: 10 November 1991 (age 34); Voghera
- Height: 1.65 cm (1 in)
- Weight: 58 kg (128 lb)

Volleyball information
- Position: Libero

Career
Years	Teams
2006-2011; 2011-2012; 2012-2015; 2015-2016; 2016-2017	(Italy) Minerva Volley Pavia (Italy) Parma Volley Girls (Italy) Minerva Volley Pavia (Italy) Unedo Yamamay Busto Arsizio (Italy) LPM Mondovì

Celeste Poma (born 10 November 1991) is an Italian volleyball player, playing in position libero.
