= Francesca Marcon =

Italian volleyball player (born 1983)

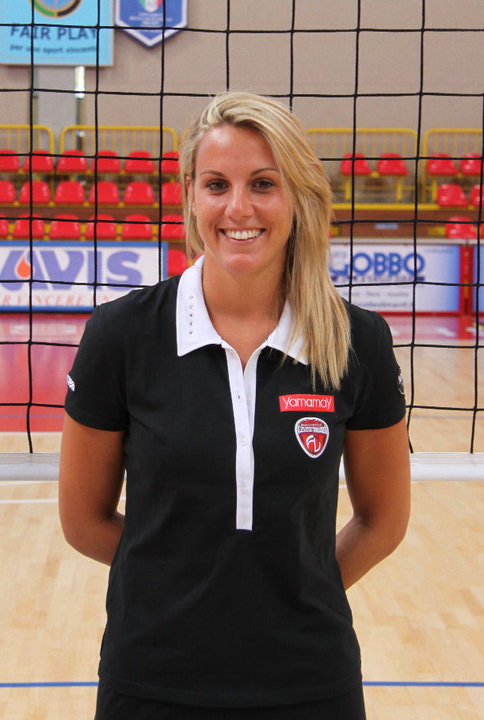

Personal information
- Nationality: Italian
- Born: 9 July 1983 (age 43)
- Height: 1.80 m (5 ft 11 in)
- Weight: 65 kg (143 lb)
- Spike: 301 cm (119 in)
- Block: 282 cm (111 in)

Career
Years	Teams
2005 - 2010	Zoppas Industries
2010 - 2015	Yamamay Busto Arsizio
2015 - 2017	Nordmeccanica Piacenza
2017 - 2018	Foppapedretti Bergamo
2018 - 2019	Èpiù Pomì Casalmaggiore
2020 - 2021	Zanetti Bergamo
2021 - 2022	Volley Bergamo 1991

National team
2009 - 2010	Italy
Medal record
Women's volleyball
Representing Italy
Mediterranean Games
Gold medal – first place	2009 Pescara	Team

Francesca Marcon (born 9 July 1983) is an Italian female volleyball player. She was part of the Italy women's national volleyball team.

== Career ==
She participated in the 2010 FIVB Volleyball World Grand Prix. On club level she played for Zoppas Industries in 2010. She was selected to play the Italian League All-Star game in 2017.
