= Iuliana Roxana Nucu =

Romanian volleyball player (born 1980)

Iuliana Nucu

Personal information
- Full name: Iuliana Roxana Nucu
- Nationality: Romania
- Born: 4 October 1980 (age 46); Constanța, Romania
- Height: 1.86 m (6 ft 1 in)

Volleyball information
- Position: Middle Blocker
- Number: 2

National team
2001-?	Romania
- Last updated: August 2012

Iuliana Roxana Nucu (born 4 October 1980 in Constanța) is a retired female volleyball player from Romania.

== Clubs ==
- (Romania) Tomis Constanța (1996–1999)
- (Romania) CSU Metal Galați (1999–2003)
- (Italy) Asystel Novara (2003–2006)
- (Italy) Sassuolo Volley (2006–2009)
- (Italy) Tiboni Urbino (2009–2010)
- (Italy) Volley Bergamo (2010–2012)
- (Italy) Crema Volley (2012–2013)
- (Romania) Dinamo Bucarest (2013)

== Awards ==
=== Clubs ===
- Italian Championship: 1 time (2011);
- Italian Cup: 1 time (2004);
- Italian Supercup: 3 times (2003, 2005, 2011);
- Challenge Cup: 1 time (2006).
