= Paola Paggi =

Italian volleyball player (born 1976)

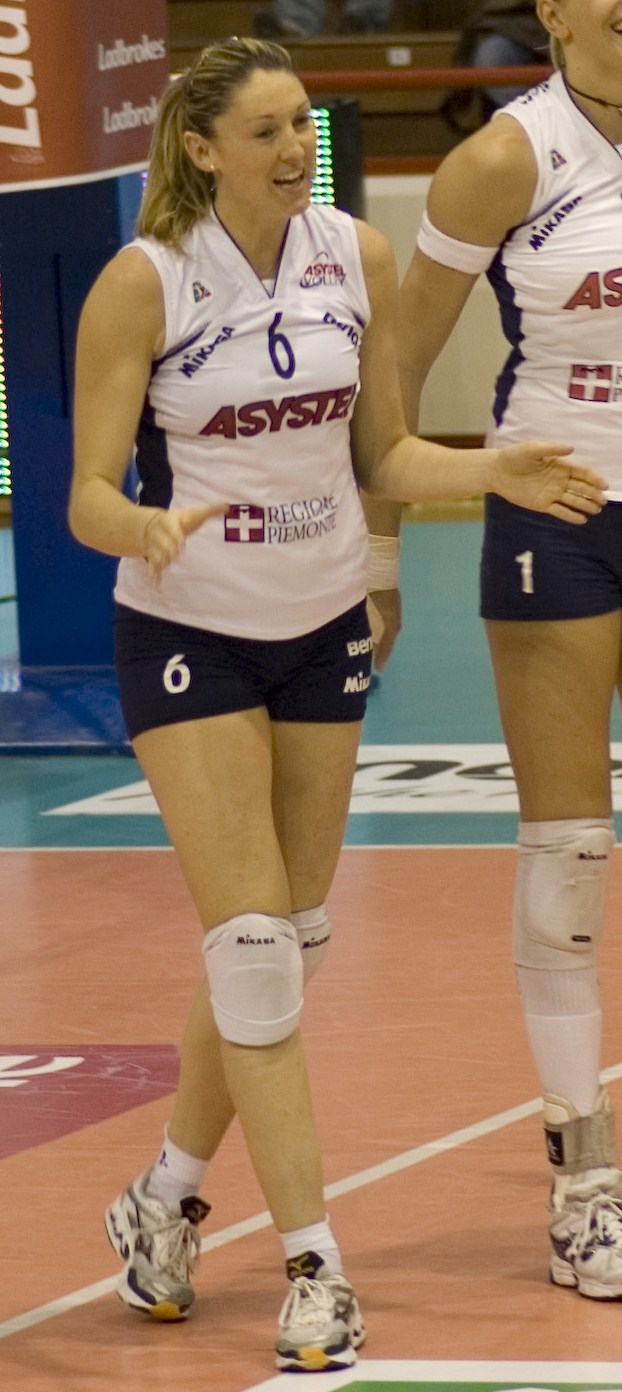

Medal record

Women's volleyball

Representing Italy

World Championship
Gold medal – first place	2002 Germany	Team

FIVB World Grand Prix
Silver medal – second place	2004 Reggio Calabria	Team
Bronze medal – third place	2006 Reggio Calabria	Team

Paola Paggi (born 6 December 1976 in Ivrea, Piedmont) is a former volleyball player from Italy, who represented her native country in two consecutive Summer Olympics, starting in 2000. She was a member of the Women's National Team, that won the title at the 2002 FIVB Women's World Championship in Germany. Paggi made her debut for Italy on 22 May 1999 against Cuba.

She won the 2008–09 CEV Cup playing with Asystel Novara and was awarded "Best Blocker". She retired from professional volleyball in 2018.

== Clubs ==
- Volley Vicenza (1996–2002)
- Volley Bergamo (2002–2007)
- (Italy) Asystel Novara (2007–2010)
- Volley Universal Modena (2010 - 2013)
- Volley Forlì (2013 - 2014)
- LJ Volley (2014)
- Volley Bergamo (2014–2018)

== Awards ==
=== Individuals ===
- 2008–09 CEV Cup "Best Blocker"

=== Clubs ===
- 2008-09 CEV Cup - Champion, with Asystel Novara
