= Benedetta Sartori =

Italian volleyball player (born 2001)

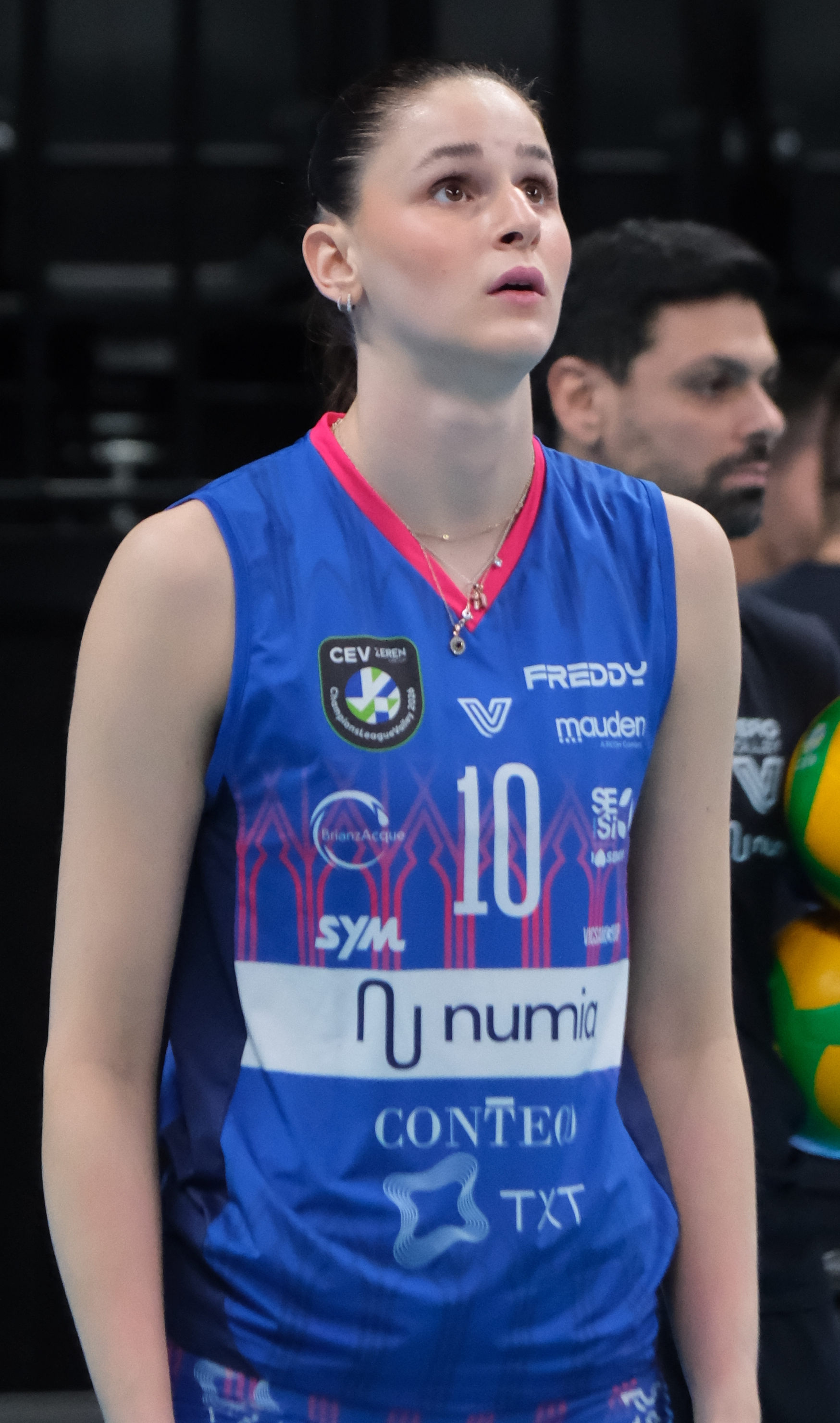
- Sartori playing for Vero Volley Milano in 2026

Personal information
- Born: 14 April 2001 (age 25); Milan, Lombardy, Italy
- Height: 1.87 m (6 ft 2 in)

Volleyball information
- Position: Middle blocker
- Current club: Vero Volley Milano
- Number: 10

Career
| Years | Teams |
|---|---|
| 2019–2022 | Futura Volley Giovani (it) |
| 2022–2023 | Casalmaggiore |
| 2023–2025 | UYBA |
| 2025– | Vero Volley Milano |

National team
| Italy |
Honours
Women's volleyball
Representing Italy
FIVB World Championship
| Gold medal – first place | 2025 Thailand | Team |
FIVB Nations League
| Gold medal – first place | 2025 Łódź | Team |
World University Games
| Gold medal – first place | 2025 Rhine-Ruhr | Team |

Benedetta Sartori (born 14 April 2001) is an Italian volleyball player who plays as a middle blocker for Vero Volley Milano and the Italy national team.

== Career ==
=== Clubs ===
Sartori began playing with the team of her hometown, Focol di Legnano, where age of 14, she was noticed by CT Matteo Lucchini who brought her to the ranks of Futura Volley of Busto Arsizio with whom she remained for 3 years. In the 2022–2023 season, she returned to A1 wearing the colours of Casalmaggiore, while for the 2023–24 season she then played with UYBA. For the 2025–26 season, she moved to Vero Volley Milano.

=== National team ===
Sartori made her international debut with the under 19 national team in 2018, having been called up to the Women's U19 Volleyball European Championship, with whom she won gold.

In 2023, Sartori was called up to the senior national team, where she took part in the delayed 2021 Summer World University Games. She took part in the 2025 Summer World University Games with the national team, with whom she won gold. She was also included in the Italy squad for the 2025 FIVB Women's Volleyball Nations League, which won the VNL title.

== Awards ==
=== National team ===
- 2025 World University Games – Gold medal
- 2025 Nations League – Gold medal
