= Loveth Omoruyi =

Italian volleyball player (born 2002)

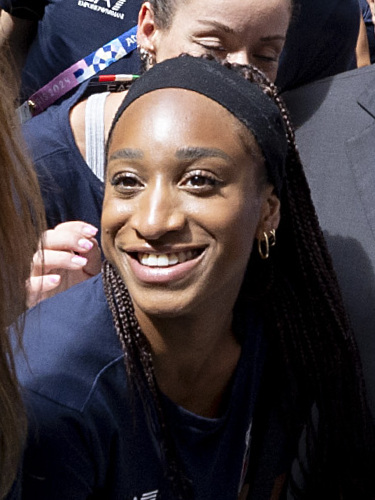
- Omoruyi at the 2024 Summer Olympics

Personal information
- Full name: Oghosasere Loveth Omoruyi
- Born: 25 August 2002 (age 24); Lodi, Lombardy, Italy
- Height: 184 cm (6 ft 0 in)
Honours
Representing Italy
Olympic Games
Gold medal – first place	2024 Paris	Team
FIVB World Championship
Gold medal – first place	2025 Thailand	Team
FIVB Nations League
Bronze medal – third place	2026 Macau	Team

Oghosasere Loveth "Lolly" Omoruyi (born 25 August 2002) is an Italian volleyball player. She represented Italy at the 2024 Summer Olympics.

== Early life and career ==
Born in Lodi to parents of Nigerian origins, Omoruyi is the second-born of four siblings. She started playing volleyball as a child, at the Sant’Alberto Oratory in her hometown. Her professional career started in 2016 with Pro Patria Milan, in the B2 league, the fourth category of Italian women's volleyball.

In 2021, Omoruyi became U20 world champion, and the same year she received her first call-up to the senior national team. At the 2022 Women's U21 European Volleyball Championship, Italy won the gold medal, with Omoruyi being named best spiker of the tournament. She was part of the gold medalled Italian team at the 2024 Summer Olympics in Paris, replacing the injured Alice Degradi.
