= Alice Degradi =

Italian volleyball player (born 1996)

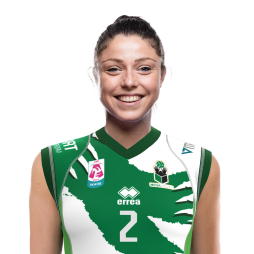

Personal information
- Born: 10 April 1996 (age 30); Pavia, Italy
- Height: 181 cm (5 ft 11 in)
Honours
FIVB Nations League
Gold medal – first place	2024 Bangkok	Team
Gold medal – first place	2025 Łódź	Team

Alice Degradi (born April 1996) is an Italian volleyball player. She won two FIVB Women's Volleyball Nations League titles with the Italian national team.

== Biography ==
=== Early life ===
Born in Pavia, after playing football, Degradi started playing volleyball when she was 11. At the age of 13, she discovered she had Type 1 diabetes.

=== Career ===
Her professional career started in 2011, at 15 years old, when she made her Serie A1 debut with Riso Scotti Pavia. In 2013, she finished as runner-up at the 2013 Girls' Youth European Volleyball Championship, and in 2018, she received her first call-ups to the senior national team, making her debut at the 2018 Mediterranean Games.

In 2024, Degradi won the gold at the FIVB Women's Volleyball Nations League. Originally selected to be part of the gold medalled Italian team at the 2024 Summer Olympics, she suffered an anterior cruciate ligament injury shortly before the beginning of the tournament and was replaced by Loveth Omoruyi. One year later, she won the 2025 FIVB Women's Volleyball Nations League. During the finals, she suffered a medial meniscus of the left knee injury, which prevented her from being part of the Italian roster at the 2025 FIVB Women's Volleyball World Championship.

=== Personal life ===
In 2020, Degradi got a degree in management engineering from the Polytechnic University of Milan. In July 2025, she was selected as the Italian spokesperson for the new Barbie doll representing Type 1 diabetes.
