= Italy women's national volleyball team =

Italy's national women's volleyball team

Italy
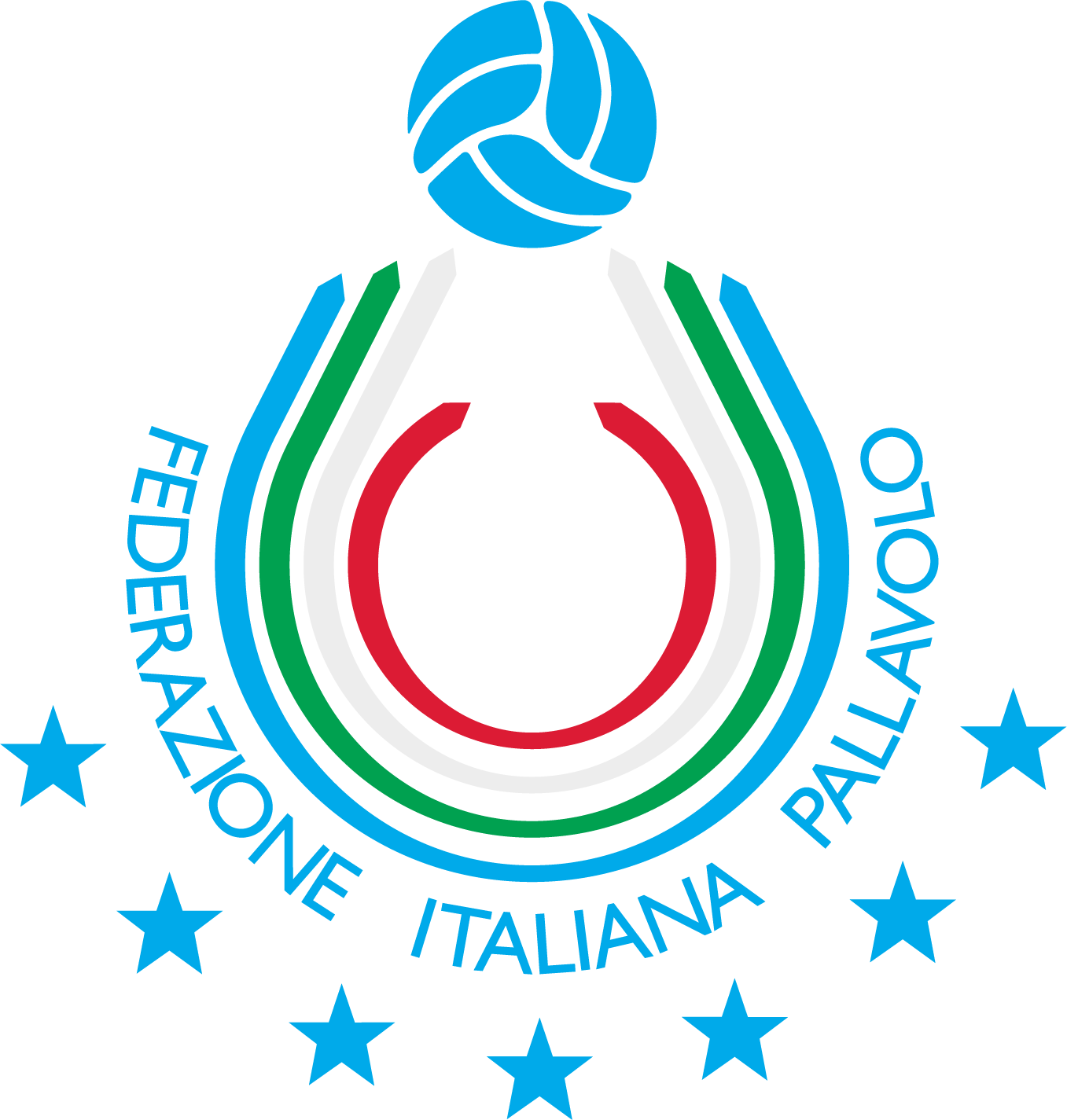
- Association: FIPAV
- Confederation: CEV
- Head coach: Julio Velasco
- FIVB ranking: 1 (2 October 2026)

Uniforms
| Home | Away |

Summer Olympics
- Appearances: 7 (First in 2000)
- Best result: (2024)

World Championship
- Appearances: 13 (First in 1978)
- Best result: (2002, 2025)

World Cup
- Appearances: 4 (First in 1999)
- Best result: (2007, 2011)

European Championship
- Appearances: 28 (First in 1951)
- Best result: (2007, 2009, 2021)
- federvolley.it
Honours
| Event | 1st | 2nd | 3rd |
|---|---|---|---|
| Summer Olympics | 1 | 0 | 0 |
| World Championship | 2 | 1 | 1 |
| World Cup | 2 | 0 | 0 |
| World Grand Champions Cup | 1 | 0 | 0 |
| World Grand Prix | 0 | 3 | 4 |
| Nations League | 3 | 0 | 1 |
| European Championship | 3 | 3 | 3 |
| Universiade | 3 | 1 | 0 |
| Mediterranean Games | 8 | 1 | 2 |
| Total | 23 | 9 | 11 |
Medal record
Olympic Games
| Gold medal – first place | 2024 Paris | Team |
World Championship
| Gold medal – first place | 2002 Germany | |
| Gold medal – first place | 2025 Thailand | |
| Silver medal – second place | 2018 Japan | |
| Bronze medal – third place | 2022 Netherlands / Poland | |
World Cup
| Gold medal – first place | 2007 Japan | |
| Gold medal – first place | 2011 Japan | |
World Grand Champions Cup
| Gold medal – first place | 2009 Tokyo/Fukuoka | |
Nations League
| Gold medal – first place | 2022 Ankara | |
| Gold medal – first place | 2024 Bangkok | |
| Gold medal – first place | 2025 Łódź | |
| Bronze medal – third place | 2026 Macau | |
World Grand Prix
| Silver medal – second place | 2004 Reggio Calabria | |
| Silver medal – second place | 2005 Sendai | |
| Silver medal – second place | 2017 Nanjing | |
| Bronze medal – third place | 2006 Reggio Calabria | |
| Bronze medal – third place | 2007 Ningbo | |
| Bronze medal – third place | 2008 Yokohama | |
| Bronze medal – third place | 2010 Ningbo | |
European Championship
| Gold medal – first place | 2007 Belgium/Luxembourg | |
| Gold medal – first place | 2009 Poland | |
| Gold medal – first place | 2021 Serbia / Bulgaria / Croatia / Romania | |
| Silver medal – second place | 2001 Bulgaria | |
| Silver medal – second place | 2005 Croatia | |
| Silver medal – second place | 2026 Azerbaijan-Czechia-Sweden-Turkey | |
| Bronze medal – third place | 1989 Sweden | |
| Bronze medal – third place | 1999 Italy | |
| Bronze medal – third place | 2019 Slovakia / Hungary / Poland / Turkey | |
Universiade
| Gold medal – first place | 1991 Sheffield | |
| Gold medal – first place | 2009 Belgrade | |
| Gold medal – first place | 2025 Berlin | |
| Silver medal – second place | 2019 Naples | |
Mediterranean Games
| Gold medal – first place | 1979 Split | Team |
| Gold medal – first place | 1983 Casablanca | Team |
| Gold medal – first place | 1991 Athens | Team |
| Gold medal – first place | 1997 Bari | Team |
| Gold medal – first place | 2001 Tunis | Team |
| Gold medal – first place | 2009 Pescara | Team |
| Gold medal – first place | 2013 Mersin | Team |
| Gold medal – first place | 2022 Oran | Team |
| Silver medal – second place | 1975 Algiers | Team |
| Bronze medal – third place | 1987 Latakia | Team |
| Bronze medal – third place | 2005 Almeria | Team |

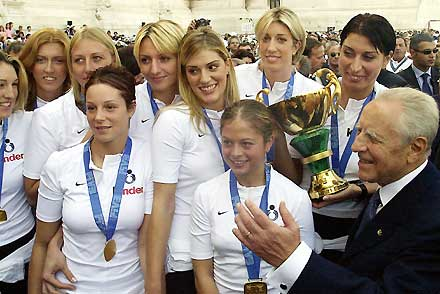
The women's national team with the President of the Italian Republic Carlo Azeglio Ciampi after winning the 2002 World Championship

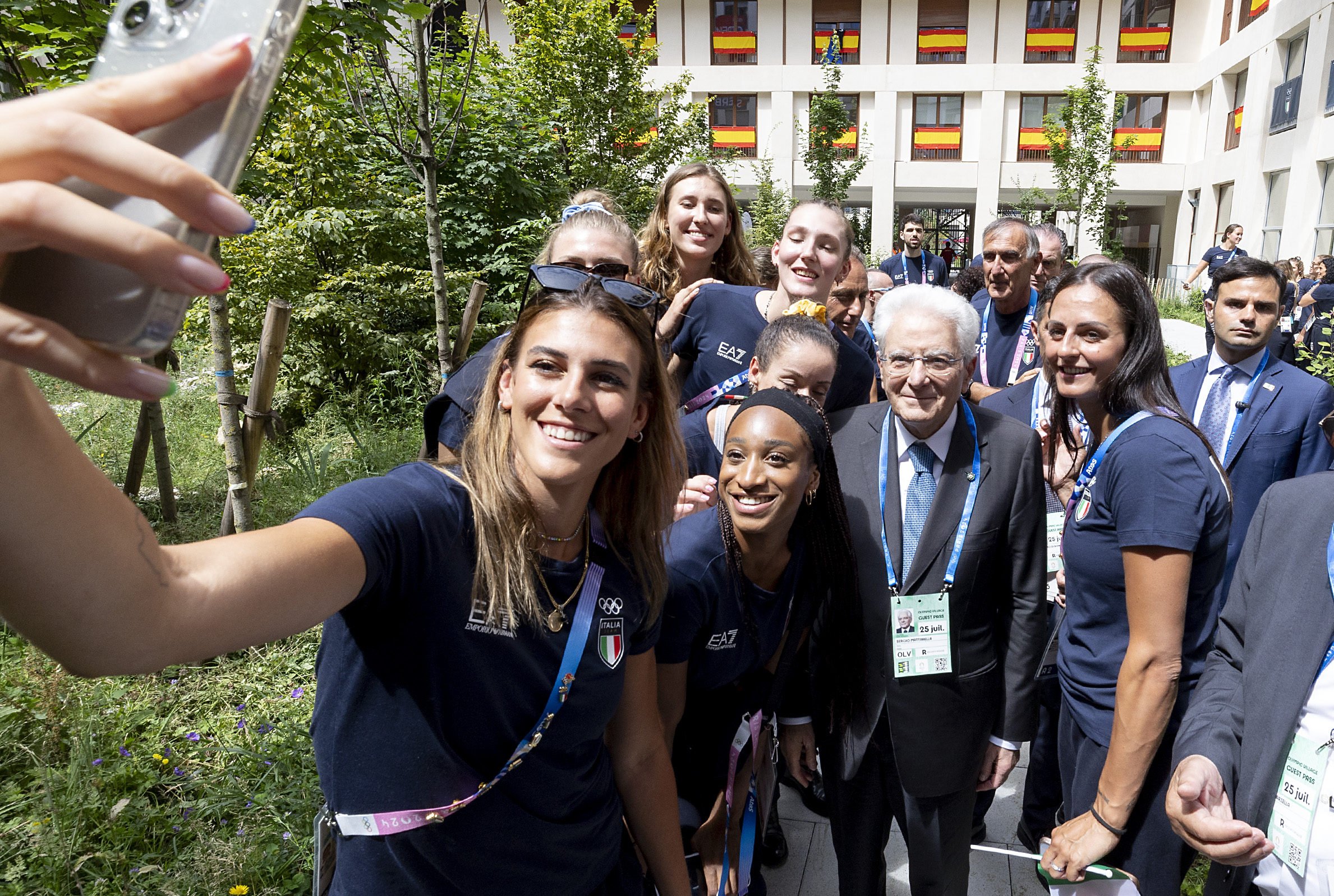
The women's national team with the President of the Italian Republic Sergio Mattarella prior winning the 2024 Summer Olympics

The Italy women's national volleyball team represents the country in international competitions and friendly matches. As of 2025, they hold three major trophies: they are the current Olympics champions, 2025 FIVB Women's Volleyball Nations League title holders and world champions. The national team is controlled by the Italian Volleyball Federation (FIPAV), the governing body for volleyball in Italy. The team's biggest victories were the gold medal at the 2024 Summer Olympics, the 2002 and 2025 World Championships, and the 2007 and 2011 World Cups. On 28 September 2025, Italy equaled a record previously held by the USSR by becoming world volleyball champions in both men’s and women’s competitions — a feat the Soviet Union had achieved in 1952 and 1960.

== Results ==
=== Summer Olympics ===
Champions Runners-up Third place Fourth place

Summer Olympics record
| Year | Round | Position | Pld | W | L | SW | SL | Squad |
|---|---|---|---|---|---|---|---|---|
| (Japan) 1964 | Did not qualify | | | | | | | |
| (Mexico) 1968 | Did not qualify | | | | | | | |
| (West Germany) 1972 | Did not qualify | | | | | | | |
| (Canada) 1976 | Did not qualify | | | | | | | |
| (Soviet Union) 1980 | Did not qualify | | | | | | | |
| (United States) 1984 | Did not qualify | | | | | | | |
| (South Korea) 1988 | Did not qualify | | | | | | | |
| (Spain) 1992 | Did not qualify | | | | | | | |
| (United States) 1996 | Did not qualify | | | | | | | |
| (Australia) 2000 | Group stage | 9th | 5 | 1 | 4 | 7 | 12 | Squad |
| (Greece) 2004 | Quarterfinals | 5th | 6 | 4 | 2 | 16 | 6 | Squad |
| (China) 2008 | Quarterfinals | 5th | 6 | 4 | 2 | 14 | 7 | Squad |
| (United Kingdom) 2012 | Quarterfinals | 5th | 6 | 4 | 2 | 15 | 8 | Squad |
| (Brazil) 2016 | Group stage | 9th | 5 | 1 | 4 | 4 | 12 | Squad |
| (Japan) 2020 | Quarterfinals | 6th | 6 | 3 | 3 | 11 | 10 | Squad |
| (France) 2024 | Final | Gold | 6 | 6 | 0 | 18 | 1 | Squad |
| (United States) 2028 | To be determined | | | | | | | |
| (Australia) 2032 | To be determined | | | | | | | |
| Total | 1 Title | 7/18 | 40 | 23 | 17 | 85 | 56 | |

- (France) 2024 — Gold Medal
  Lubian, Cambi, Spirito, De Gennaro, Orro, Bosetti, Danesi, Sylla, Egonu, Fahr, Omoruyi, Antropova, Giovannini. Head Coach: Velasco

=== World Championship ===
Champions Runners-up Third place Fourth place

World Championship record
| Year | Round | Position | Pld | W | L | SW | SL | Squad |
|---|---|---|---|---|---|---|---|---|
| (Soviet Union) 1952 | Did not enter | | | | | | | |
| (France) 1956 | Did not enter | | | | | | | |
| (Brazil) 1960 | Did not enter | | | | | | | |
| (Soviet Union) 1962 | Did not enter | | | | | | | |
| (Japan) 1967 | Did not enter | | | | | | | |
| (Bulgaria) 1970 | Did not qualify | | | | | | | |
| (Mexico) 1974 | Did not qualify | | | | | | | |
| (Soviet Union) 1978 | 17th–20th places | 20th | 9 | 3 | 6 | 12 | 18 | Squad |
| (Peru) 1982 | 13th–16th places | 15th | 8 | 4 | 4 | 16 | 15 | Squad |
| (Czechoslovakia) 1986 | 9th–12th places | 9th | 8 | 3 | 5 | 10 | 18 | Squad |
| (China) 1990 | 9th–12th places | 10th | 6 | 2 | 4 | 7 | 14 | Squad |
| (Brazil) 1994 | First round | 13th | 3 | 0 | 3 | 3 | 9 | Squad |
| (Japan) 1998 | 5th–8th places | 5th | 8 | 5 | 3 | 17 | 9 | Squad |
| (Germany) 2002 | Final | Champions | 11 | 9 | 2 | 30 | 9 | Squad |
| (Japan) 2006 | Semifinals | Fourth place | 11 | 8 | 3 | 22 | 10 | Squad |
| (Japan) 2010 | 5th–8th places | 5th | 11 | 8 | 3 | 28 | 13 | Squad |
| (Italy) 2014 | Semifinals | Fourth place | 13 | 10 | 3 | 35 | 13 | Squad |
| (Japan) 2018 | Final | Runners-up | 13 | 11 | 2 | 36 | 13 | Squad |
| (Netherlands) (Poland) 2022 | Semifinals | Third place | 12 | 10 | 2 | 33 | 10 | Squad |
| (Thailand) 2025 | Final | Champions | 7 | 7 | 0 | 21 | 5 | Squad |
| (United States) (Canada) 2027 | Qualified | | | | | | | |
| (Philippines) 2029 | To be determined | | | | | | | |
| Total | 2 Titles | 13/22 | 120 | 80 | 40 | 270 | 156 | |

- (Germany) 2002 — Gold medal
  Anzanello, Borrelli, Cardullo, Leggeri, Lo Bianco, Mello, Mifkova, Paggi, Piccinini, Rinieri, Sangiuliano, Togut. Head Coach: Bonitta
- (Thailand) 2025 — Gold medal
  Cambi, De Gennaro, Fersino, Orro, Sartori, Danesi, Nervini, Sylla, Egonu, Fahr, Omoruyi, Giovannini, Antropova, Akrari. Head Coach: Velasco

=== World Cup ===
Champions Runners-up Third place Fourth place

World Cup record
| Year | Round | Position | Pld | W | L | SW | SL | Squad |
|---|---|---|---|---|---|---|---|---|
| (Uruguay) 1973 | Did not qualify | | | | | | | |
| (Japan) 1977 | Did not qualify | | | | | | | |
| (Japan) 1981 | Did not qualify | | | | | | | |
| (Japan) 1985 | Did not qualify | | | | | | | |
| (Japan) 1989 | Did not qualify | | | | | | | |
| (Japan) 1991 | Did not qualify | | | | | | | |
| (Japan) 1995 | Did not qualify | | | | | | | |
| (Japan) 1999 | - | 7th | 11 | 5 | 6 | 19 | 21 | Squad |
| (Japan) 2003 | - | 4th | 11 | 7 | 4 | 22 | 14 | Squad |
| (Japan) 2007 | - | 1st | 11 | 11 | 0 | 33 | 2 | Squad |
| (Japan) 2011 | - | 1st | 11 | 10 | 1 | 31 | 8 | Squad |
| (Japan) 2015 | Did not qualify | | | | | | | |
| (Japan) 2019 | Did not qualify | | | | | | | |
| Total | 2 Titles | 4/13 | 44 | 33 | 11 | 105 | 45 | |

- (Japan) 2007 — Gold medal
  Anzanello, Guiggi, Barazza, Secolo, Cardullo, Ortolani, Aguero, Ferretti, Lo Bianco, Del Core, Gioli. Head Coach: Barbolini
- (Japan) 2011 — Gold medal
  Anzanello, Barcellini, Croce, De Gennaro, Costagrande, C. Bosetti, Sirressi, Arrighetti, Lo Bianco, Del Core, L. Bosetti, Gioli, Signorile, Folie. Head Coach: Barbolini

=== World Grand Champions Cup ===
- 2009 — (gold) Gold medal

=== World Grand Prix ===
Champions Runners-up Third place Fourth place

World Grand Prix record
| Year | Round | Position | Pld | W | L | SW | SL | Squad |
|---|---|---|---|---|---|---|---|---|
| (Hong Kong) 1993 | Did not enter | | | | | | | |
| (China) 1994 | Preliminary round | 8th | 9 | 2 | 7 | 12 | 22 | Squad |
| (China) 1995 | Did not enter | | | | | | | |
| (China) 1996 | Did not enter | | | | | | | |
| (Japan) 1997 | Preliminary round | 6th | 9 | 4 | 5 | 15 | 21 | Squad |
| (Hong Kong) 1998 | Preliminary round | 5th | 9 | 4 | 5 | 14 | 21 | Squad |
| (China) 1999 | Semifinals | 4th | 8 | 3 | 5 | 13 | 18 | Squad |
| (Philippines) 2000 | 5th–8th places | 7th | 11 | 2 | 9 | 10 | 30 | Squad |
| (Macau) 2001 | Did Not Qualify | | | | | | | |
| (Hong Kong) 2002 | Did Not Qualify | | | | | | | |
| (Italy) 2003 | Final Round | 5th | 10 | 3 | 7 | 19 | 25 | Squad |
| (Italy) 2004 | Final | Runners-up | 13 | 8 | 5 | 29 | 23 | Squad |
| (Japan) 2005 | Final round | Runners-up | 14 | 9 | 5 | 32 | 16 | Squad |
| (Italy) 2006 | Semifinals | Third place | 13 | 9 | 4 | 31 | 18 | Squad |
| (China) 2007 | Final round | Third place | 14 | 9 | 5 | 33 | 21 | Squad |
| (Japan) 2008 | Final round | Third place | 14 | 10 | 4 | 33 | 22 | Squad |
| (Japan) 2009 | Did Not Qualify | | | | | | | |
| (China) 2010 | Final round | Third place | 14 | 8 | 6 | 30 | 22 | Squad |
| (Macau) 2011 | Final round | 7th | 13 | 8 | 5 | 27 | 24 | Squad |
| (China) 2012 | Preliminary round | 10th | 9 | 4 | 5 | 16 | 19 | Squad |
| (Japan) 2013 | Final round | 5th | 14 | 8 | 6 | 31 | 23 | Squad |
| (Japan) 2014 | Preliminary round | 10th | 9 | 5 | 4 | 18 | 18 | Squad |
| (United States) 2015 | Final round | 5th | 14 | 7 | 7 | 26 | 27 | Squad |
| (Thailand) 2016 | Preliminary round | 8th | 9 | 4 | 5 | 19 | 19 | Squad |
| (China) 2017 | Final | Runners-up | 13 | 8 | 5 | 28 | 22 | Squad |
| Total | 0 Titles | 19/25 | 219 | 115 | 104 | 436 | 411 | |

=== Nations League ===
Champions Runners-up Third place Fourth place

Nations League record
| Year | Round | Position | GP | MW | ML | SW | SL | Squad |
|---|---|---|---|---|---|---|---|---|
| (China) 2018 | Preliminary Round | 7th | 15 | 10 | 5 | 34 | 22 | Squad |
| (China) 2019 | Final Round | 6th | 17 | 11 | 6 | 40 | 27 | Squad |
| (Italy) 2021 | Preliminary Round | 12th | 15 | 4 | 11 | 24 | 35 | Squad |
| (Turkey) 2022 | Final | Champions | 15 | 13 | 2 | 40 | 14 | Squad |
| (United States) 2023 | Quarterfinals | 6th | 13 | 8 | 5 | 29 | 26 | Squad |
| (Thailand) 2024 | Final | Champions | 15 | 13 | 2 | 41 | 11 | Squad |
| (Poland) 2025 | Final | Champions | 15 | 15 | 0 | 45 | 8 | Squad |
| (Macau) 2026 | Semifinals | Third place | 15 | 12 | 3 | 40 | 18 | Squad |
| (N/A) 2027 | qualified | | | | | | | |
| Total | 3 Titles | 9/9 | 120 | 86 | 34 | 293 | 161 | — |

=== European Championship ===
Champions Runners-up Third place Fourth place

European Championship record
| Year | Round | Position | Pld | W | L | SW | SL | Squad |
|---|---|---|---|---|---|---|---|---|
| (Czechoslovakia) 1949 | Did not enter | | | | | | | |
| (Bulgaria) 1950 | Did not enter | | | | | | | |
| (France) 1951 | 1st round | 6th | 2 | 0 | 2 | 0 | 6 | Squad |
| (Romania) 1955 | Did not qualify | | | | | | | |
| (Czechoslovakia) 1958 | Did not qualify | | | | | | | |
| (Romania) 1963 | Did not qualify | | | | | | | |
| (Turkey) 1967 | 1st round | 11th | 9 | 4 | 5 | 12 | 17 | Squad |
| (Italy) 1971 | 1st round | 8th | 7 | 5 | 2 | 15 | 8 | Squad |
| (Socialist Federal Republic of Yugoslavia) 1975 | 1st round | 9th | 8 | 3 | 5 | 14 | 17 | Squad |
| (Finland) 1977 | 1st round | 11th | 7 | 2 | 5 | 9 | 16 | Squad |
| (France) 1979 | Did not qualify | | | | | | | |
| (Bulgaria) 1981 | 1st round | 8th | 8 | 5 | 3 | 17 | 10 | Squad |
| (East Germany) 1983 | 1st round | 7th | 8 | 5 | 3 | 15 | 10 | Squad |
| (Netherlands) 1985 | Final Round | 5th | 8 | 3 | 5 | 10 | 20 | Squad |
| (Belgium) 1987 | 1st round | 6th | 7 | 3 | 4 | 12 | 14 | Squad |
| (West Germany) 1989 | Semifinals | Third place | 7 | 4 | 3 | 13 | 10 | Squad |
| (Italy) 1991 | Semifinals | 4th | 7 | 4 | 3 | 14 | 9 | Squad |

European Championship record
| Year | Round | Position | Pld | W | L | SW | SL | Squad |
|---|---|---|---|---|---|---|---|---|
| (Czech Republic) 1993 | Semifinals | 4th | 7 | 3 | 4 | 14 | 14 | Squad |
| (Netherlands) 1995 | 1st round | 6th | 7 | 3 | 4 | 13 | 14 | Squad |
| (Czech Republic) 1997 | 1st round | 5th | 7 | 5 | 2 | 16 | 7 | Squad |
| (Italy) 1999 | Semifinals | Third place | 5 | 3 | 2 | 12 | 8 | Squad |
| (Bulgaria) 2001 | Final | Runners-up | 7 | 6 | 1 | 20 | 7 | Squad |
| (Turkey) 2003 | 1st round | 6th | 7 | 4 | 3 | 14 | 11 | Squad |
| (Croatia) 2005 | Final | Runners-up | 7 | 6 | 1 | 19 | 6 | Squad |
| (Belgium) / (Luxembourg) 2007 | Final | Champions | 8 | 8 | 0 | 24 | 2 | Squad |
| (Poland) 2009 | Final | Champions | 8 | 8 | 0 | 24 | 2 | Squad |
| (Italy) / (Serbia) 2011 | Semifinals | 4th | 6 | 3 | 3 | 13 | 11 | Squad |
| (Germany) / (Switzerland) 2013 | Quarterfinals | 6th | 5 | 3 | 2 | 10 | 7 | Squad |
| (Netherlands) 2015 | Quarterfinals | 7th | 5 | 3 | 2 | 10 | 8 | Squad |
| (Azerbaijan) (Georgia (country)) 2017 | Quarterfinals | 5th | 4 | 3 | 1 | 9 | 6 | Squad |
| (Hungary) / (Poland) / (Slovakia) / (Turkey) 2019 | Semifinals | Third place | 9 | 7 | 2 | 24 | 7 | Squad |
| (Serbia) / (Bulgaria) / (Croatia) / (Romania) 2021 | Final | Champions | 9 | 9 | 0 | 27 | 4 | Squad |
| (Belgium) / (Italy) / (Germany) / (Estonia) 2023 | Semifinals | 4th | 9 | 7 | 2 | 23 | 6 | Squad |
| (Azerbaijan) / (Czech Republic) / (Sweden) / (Turkey) 2026 | Final | Runners-up | 9 | 8 | 1 | 26 | 6 | Squad |
| (Slovakia) / (Spain) / (N/A) / (N/A) 2028 | To be determined | | | | | | | |
| Total | 3 Titles | 28/35 | 188 | 119 | 69 | 403 | 256 | |

- (Belgium) (Luxembourg) 2007 — Gold medal
  Gioli, Croce, Fiorin, Guiggi, Barazza, Secolo, Ortolani, Aguero, Ferretti, Lo Bianco, Del Core, Cardullo. Head Coach: Barbolini
- (Poland) 2009 — Gold medal
  Crisanti, Rondon, Merlo, Barazza, Secolo, Cardullo, Ortolani, Piccinini, Arrighetti, Lo Bianco, Del Core, Bosetti, Gioli, Agüero. Head Coach: Barbolini
- (Serbia) (Bulgaria) (Croatia) (Romania) 2021 — Gold medal
  Gennari, Bonifacio, Malinov, De Gennaro, Orro, Chirichella, Danesi, Fahr, Pietrini, Nwakalor, Sylla, Egonu, Parrocchiale, Mazzaro, Sofia D'Odorico. Head Coach: Mazzanti

=== Mediterranean Games ===
- 1975 — (silver) Silver medal
- 1979 — (gold) Gold medal
- 1983 — (gold) Gold medal
- 1987 — (bronze) Bronze medal
- 1991 — (gold) Gold medal
- 1997 — (gold) Gold medal
- 2001 — (gold) Gold medal
- 2005 — (bronze) Bronze medal
- 2009 — (gold) Gold medal
- 2013 — (gold) Gold medal
- 2018 — 5th
- 2022 — (gold) Gold medal

== Team ==
=== Current squad ===
Head coach: Julio Velasco

- 3 Carlotta Cambi (S)
- 6 Monica De Gennaro (L)
- 7 Eleonora Fersino (L)
- 8 Alessia Orro (S)
- 10 Benedetta Sartori (MB)
- 11 Anna Danesi (MB)
- 16 Stella Nervini (OH)
- 17 Myriam Sylla (OH)
- 18 Paola Egonu (OP)
- 19 Sarah Fahr (MB)
- 21 Loveth Omoruyi (OH)
- 22 Gaia Giovannini (OH)
- 24 Ekaterina Antropova (OP)
- 25 Yasmina Akrari (MB)

=== Previous squads ===
The following is the Italian roster in the 2021 European Championship.

Head coach: Davide Mazzanti

| No. | Name | Date of birth | Height | Weight | Spike | Block | 2020–21 club |
|---|---|---|---|---|---|---|---|
| 3 | Alessia Gennari | 3 November 1991 | 1.84 m (6 ft 0 in) | 68 kg (150 lb) | 302 cm (119 in) | 284 cm (112 in) | (Italy) Imoco Conegliano |
| 4 | Sara Bonifacio | 3 July 1996 | 1.86 m (6 ft 1 in) | 75 kg (165 lb) | 324 cm (128 in) | 244 cm (96 in) | (Italy) AGIL Novara |
| 5 | Ofelia Malinov | 29 February 1996 | 1.85 m (6 ft 1 in) | 70 kg (150 lb) | 304 cm (120 in) | 285 cm (112 in) | (Italy) Azzurra Volley San Casciano |
| 6 | Monica De Gennaro | 8 January 1987 | 1.74 m (5 ft 9 in) | 67 kg (148 lb) | 292 cm (115 in) | 217 cm (85 in) | (Italy) Imoco Conegliano |
| 8 | Alessia Orro | 18 July 1998 | 1.80 m (5 ft 11 in) | 64 kg (141 lb) | 308 cm (121 in) | 231 cm (91 in) | (Italy) Pro Victoria Monza |
| 10 | Cristina Chirichella | 10 February 1994 | 1.95 m (6 ft 5 in) | 79 kg (174 lb) | 322 cm (127 in) | 306 cm (120 in) | (Italy) AGIL Novara |
| 11 | Anna Danesi (c) | 20 April 1996 | 1.98 m (6 ft 6 in) | 78 kg (172 lb) | 312 cm (123 in) | 294 cm (116 in) | (Italy) AGIL Novara |
| 13 | Sarah Fahr | 12 September 2001 | 1.94 m (6 ft 4 in) | 84 kg (185 lb) | 322 cm (127 in) | 306 cm (120 in) | (Italy) Imoco Conegliano |
| 14 | Elena Pietrini | 17 March 2000 | 1.90 m (6 ft 3 in) | 73 kg (161 lb) | 330 cm (130 in) | 306 cm (120 in) | (Italy) Savino Del Bene Scandicci |
| 15 | Sylvia Nwakalor | 12 August 1999 | 1.77 m (5 ft 10 in) | 70 kg (150 lb) | 330 cm (130 in) | 312 cm (123 in) | (Italy) Azzurra Volley San Casciano |
| 17 | Miriam Sylla | 8 January 1995 | 1.84 m (6 ft 0 in) | 80 kg (180 lb) | 320 cm (130 in) | 240 cm (94 in) | (Italy) Pro Victoria Monza |
| 18 | Paola Egonu | 18 December 1998 | 1.93 m (6 ft 4 in) | 80 kg (180 lb) | 344 cm (135 in) | 321 cm (126 in) | (Turkey) VakıfBank S.K. |
| 20 | Beatrice Parrocchiale | 26 December 1995 | 1.67 m (5 ft 6 in) | 60 kg (130 lb) | 296 cm (117 in) | 213 cm (84 in) | (Italy) Pro Victoria Monza |
| 24 | Alessia Mazzaro | 19 September 1998 | 1.85 m (6 ft 1 in) | 64 kg (141 lb) | 302 cm (119 in) | 284 cm (112 in) | (Italy) Chieri '76 Volleyball |
| 29 | Sofia D'Odorico | 6 January 1997 | 1.87 m (6 ft 2 in) | 78 kg (172 lb) | 312 cm (123 in) | 302 cm (119 in) | (Italy) AGIL Novara |

=== Notable former players ===
- Monica De Gennaro
- Simona Gioli
- Carolina Costagrande
- Paola Croce
- Francesca Piccinini
- Elisa Togut
- Valentina Arrighetti
- Taismary Agüero
- Eleonora Lo Bianco
- Antonella Del Core
- Simona Rinieri
- Manuela Leggeri
- Paola Cardullo
- Sabrina Bertini
- Darina Mifkova
- Sara Anzanello
- Maurizia Cacciatori
- Raffaella Calloni
- Paola Paggi
- Nadia Centoni
- Jenny Barazza
- Martina Guiggi
