= Rossella Olivotto =

Italian volleyball player (born 1991)

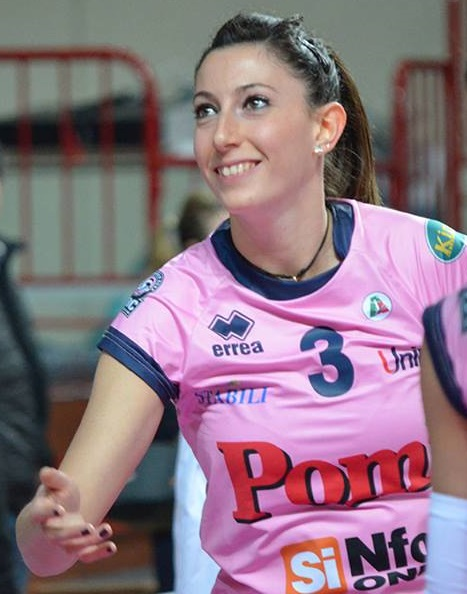

Personal information
- Nationality: Italian
- Born: 27 April 1991 (age 35); Trento, Italy
- Height: 184 cm (72 in)

Volleyball information
- Position: Middle-blocker
- Current club: (Italy) Pomi Casalmaggiore
- Number: 13

Career
Years	Teams
2015	VB Casalmaggiore

Rossella Olivotto (born 27 April 1991) is an Italian volleyball player, playing as a Middle-blocker. She competed at the 2015 Women's European Volleyball Championship. On club level she plays for VB Casalmaggiore.
