= 2001 Women's European Volleyball Championship squads =

This article shows all participating team squads at the 2001 Women's European Volleyball Championship, held in Sofia and Varna, Bulgaria from September 22 to September 30, 2001.

== Pool A ==
=== Bulgaria ===
- Head coach: Emil Trenev

#	Name	Date of Birth	Weight	Height	Spike	Block
1	Marina Marik	17.08.1969	67	180
4	Vanya Sokolova	22.06.1971	76	189
5	Antonina Zetova	09.07.1973	75	189
6	Dessislava Velitchkova	22.12.1972
7	Neli Neshich	27.05.1971	62	173
11	Elena Arsova	05.11.1975
13	Aneta Germanova	01.03.1975	72	186
14	Iliyana Gocheva	11.02.1976	68	188
15	Emiliya Serafimova	24.09.1976
16	Radostina Gradeva	03.09.1978
17	Anna Milanova	06.02.1978
18	Iliyana Petkova	11.10.1977	72	190

=== Czech Republic ===
- Head coach: Miroslav Čada

#	Name	Date of Birth	Weight	Height	Spike	Block
2	Zdeňka Mocová	17.10.1974
3	Andréa Sieglova	03.05.1976
5	Jana Simankova	04.06.1980	65	179
7	Marcela Ritschelova	09.10.1972	82	192
8	Katerina Buckova	28.04.1978	75	190
9	Kateřina Jenčková	18.05.1971	75	186
10	Martina Schwobova	03.05.1976
11	Jana Havlova	27.05.1978	65	180
12	Helena Horka	15.06.1981	78	188
15	Jana Jamborova	21.05.1981
16	Marketa Tomanova	10.02.1982
18	Milada Spalová	16.11.1979	75	189

=== France ===
- Head coach: Jue Gang-Bai

#	Name	Date of Birth	Weight	Height	Spike	Block
1	Karine Salinas	05.03.1973	67	175	290	280
2	Sylvie Lopes	12.08.1973	69	180	295	280
3	Virginie Sarpaux	12.06.1977	78	193	315	305
4	Lauranne Dautais	20.06.1973	70	175	304	292
5	Séverine Szewczyk	29.06.1976	79	178	310	288
6	Sandra Urios	13.06.1975	70	180	305	297
7	Laure Koenig	18.04.1975	69	183	305	285
8	Sandra Kociniewski	22.05.1975	68	181	302	290
10	Karine Havas	14.04.1976	61	178	288	274
11	Virginie Kadjo	03.05.1973	62	178	296	275
14	Séverine Lienard	19.02.1979	61	178	285	275
17	Kinga Maculewicz	27.05.1978	75	187	306	290

=== Greece ===
- Head coach: Dimitrios Floros

#	Name	Date of Birth	Weight	Height	Spike	Block
1	Ourania Gkouzou	25.01.1981
2	Maria Gkaragkouni	21.12.1975	84	180
3	Eleni Fragkiadaki	23.06.1982
4	Niki Gkaragkouni	12.03.1977	83	184
5	Fidanka Saparefska	04.05.1970	67	181
7	Georgia Paraskaki	26.06.1981
9	Eleftheria Chatzinikou	20.04.1978	60	182
11	Vasiliki Papazoglou	24.08.1979	77	190
12	Maria Chatzinikolaou	30.09.1978
13	Vaia Dirva	22.04.1977	65	190
14	Sofia Iordanidou	03.05.1974
17	Ioanna Vlachou	14.05.1981	65	170

=== Romania ===
- Head coach: Costinel Stan

#	Name	Date of Birth	Weight	Height	Spike	Block
—	Anca Bergmann	21.02.1976		182	305	295
—	Irina Carmen Busu	25.06.1978		184
—	Elena Butnaru	27.04.1975		183	301	290
—	Claudia Coiculescu	17.09.1972		176
—	Mirela Corjeutanu	06.07.1977	80	190	310	298
—	Carmen Danoiu	01.11.1979
—	Cristina Pîrv	29.06.1972	61	185	300	285
—	Alida Marcovici	20.03.1973	76	190	301	305
—	Daniela Mincă	14.07.1971		178
—	Luminița Trombițaș	05.07.1971	66	182	298	288
—	Carmen Țurlea	18.11.1975	65	183	310	300

=== Russia ===
- Head coach: Nikolay Karpol

#	Name	Date of Birth	Weight	Height	Spike	Block
—	Evgenya Artamonova	17.07.1975	74	190
—	Ekaterina Gamova	17.10.1980	82	205
—	Elena Godina	17.09.1977	72	194
—	Tatyana Gracheva	23.02.1973	74	180
—	Inessa Korkmaz	17.01.1972
—	Natalya Morozova	28.01.1973
—	Elena Plotnikova	26.07.1978	73	185
—	Olga Potachova	26.06.1976
—	Elena Tiourina	12.04.1971	80	184
—	Elizaveta Tishchenko	07.02.1975	74	190
—	Yelena Vasilevskaya	27.02.1978

== Pool B ==
=== Croatia ===
- Head coach: Nenad Komadina

#	Name	Date of Birth	Weight	Height	Spike	Block
1	Nataša Osmokrović	27.05.1976
2	Ingrid Šišković	06.06.1980
3	Patricia Daničić	21.04.1978
4	Marina Katić	01.10.1983
5	Dragana Marinković	19.10.1982
10	Biljana Gligorović	31.10.1982
11	Elena Čebukina	11.10.1965
12	Vesna Jelić	22.03.1982
13	Beti Rimac	14.01.1976
15	Maja Poljak	02.05.1983
16	Mia Jerkov	05.12.1982
18	Iskra Mijalić	04.02.1983

=== Germany ===
- Head coach: Lee Hee-Wan

#	Name	Date of Birth	Weight	Height	Spike	Block
1	Hanka Pachale	12.09.1976	73	190	316	299
2	Béatrice Dömeland	04.08.1973	63	180	300	287
3	Tanja Hart	24.01.1974	64	176	290	275
5	Sylvia Roll	29.05.1973	70	180	308	286
6	Ina Mäser	12.01.1977
7	Ulrike Jurk	04.03.1979	60	174
9	Christina Benecke	14.10.1974	80	190	314	291
14	Kathy Radzuweit	02.03.1982	82	196	319	300
15	Angelina Grün	02.12.1979	74	185	309	287
16	Judith Sylvester	13.10.1977	88	193	312	296
17	Birgit Thumm	03.07.1983	71	184	310	289
18	Andrea Berg	24.01.1981	71	188	306	299

=== Italy ===
- Head coach: Marco Bonitta

#	Name	Date of Birth	Weight	Height	Spike	Block
—	Vania Beccaria	24.07.1973		194
—	Maurizia Cacciatori	06.04.1973	64	178	298	274
—	Paola Cardullo	18.03.1982	56	162	275	268
—	Silvia Croatto	06.05.1973
—	Manuela Leggeri	09.05.1976	74	183	312	281
—	Eleonora Lo Bianco	22.12.1979	70	172	287	273
—	Anna Vania Mello	27.02.1979	72	183	310	278
—	Darina Mifkova	24.05.1974	78	185	308	279
—	Paola Paggi	06.12.1976	72	182	306	278
—	Francesca Piccinini	10.01.1979	75	180	304	279
—	Simona Rinieri	01.09.1977	85	188	308	281
—	Elisa Togut	14.05.1978	70	192	320	295

=== Netherlands ===
- Head coach: Angelo Frigoni

#	Name	Date of birth	Weight	Height	Spike	Block
1	Kim Staelens	07.01.1982	72	182
3	Francien Huurman	18.04.1975	76	192	319	307
4	Erna Brinkman	25.03.1972
5	Janneke van Tienen	29.05.1979	73	172	280	273
6	Mirjam Orsel	01.04.1978	74	192	306	292
7	Elke Wijnhoven	03.01.1981	65	168	293	283
8	Hanneke van Leusden	28.01.1972
14	Riëtte Fledderus	18.10.1977	71	168	288	268
15	Ingrid Visser	04.06.1977	75	188	312	292
16	Manon Flier	08.02.1984	65	192	307	301
17	Ruth van der Wel	06.01.1978
18	Sandra Wiegers	26.04.1974

=== Poland ===
- Head coach: Zbigniew Krzyżanowski

#	Name	Date of Birth	Weight	Height	Spike	Block
1	Katarzyna Mroczkowska	30.12.1980
—	Izabela Bełcik	29.11.1980
6	Małgorzata Glinka	30.09.1978
7	Katarzyna Gujska	15.02.1975
9	Milena Rosner	04.01.1980
10	Karolina Ciaszkiewicz	07.09.1979
11	Kamila Frątczak	25.11.1979
13	Dominika Leśniewicz	13.01.1974
15	Barbara Merta	10.01.1976
16	Aleksandra Przybysz	02.06.1980
17	Joanna Staniucha	05.12.1981
18	Sylwia Pycia	20.04.1981

=== Ukraine ===
- Head coach: Gariy Yegiazarov

#	Name	Date of Birth	Weight	Height	Spike	Block
2	Alla Kravets	12.01.1973
—	Mariya Aleksandrova	07.04.1974
—	Alexandra Fomina	04.05.1975
4	Olena Sydorenko	20.01.1974
5	Tetyana Ivanyushkina	18.09.1966
6	Regina Miloserdova	09.06.1973
7	Irina Zhukova	22.11.1974
9	Olena Yena	24.06.1972
10	Tetyana Voronina	20.10.1977
14	Yuliya Shelukhina	03.04.1979
15	Nataliya Bozhenova	15.01.1969
17	Maryna Martsynyuk	26.02.1981
