= Volleyball at the 1996 Summer Olympics – Women's team rosters =

This is a list of all participating squads of the Volleyball at the 1996 Summer Olympics – Women's tournament, organised by the world's governing body, the FIVB in conjunction with the International Olympic Committee. It was held from July 20 to August 3, 1996 in the Stegeman Coliseum and the Omni Coliseum of The University of Georgia in Atlanta, Georgia (United States).

== Squads ==
=== Brazil ===
- Ana Ida Alvares
- Leila Barros
- Ericleia Bodziak
- Hilma Caldeira
- Ana Paula Connelly
- Marcia Fu Cunha
- Virna Dias
- Ana Moser
- Ana Flavia Sanglard (c)
- Hélia Souza
- Sandra Suruagy
- Fernanda Venturini
- Head coach:
  Bernardo Rezende

=== Canada ===
- Kerri Buchberger
- Josee Corbeil
- Wanda Guenette
- Janis Kelly
- Lori Ann Mundt
- Diane Ratnik
- Erminia Russo
- Michelle Sawatzky
- Brigitte Soucy
- Christine Stark
- Kathy Tough (c)
- Katrina Von Sass
- Head coach:
  Mike Burchuk

=== China ===
- Cui Yongmei
- He Qi
- Lai Yawen (c)
- Li Yan
- Liu Xiaoning
- Pan Wenli
- Sun Yue
- Wang Lina
- Wang Yi
- Wang Ziling
- Wu Yongmei
- Zhu Yunying
- Head coach:
  Lang Ping

=== Cuba ===
- Taimarys Aguero
- Regla Bell
- Magalys Carvajal
- Marlenys Costa
- Ana Fernández
- Mirka Francia
- Idalmis Gato
- Lilia Izquierdo
- Mireya Luis (c)
- Raisa O'Farril
- Yumilka Ruíz
- Regla Torres
- Head coach:
  Eugenio George Lafita

=== Germany ===
- Nancy Celis
- Tanja Hart
- Karin Horninger
- Silvia Roll
- Susanne Lahme
- Grit Naumann
- Hanka Pachale
- Ines Pianka (c)
- Constanze Radfan
- Christine Schultz
- Ute Steppin
- Claudia Wilke
- Head coach:
  Siegfried Köhler

=== Japan ===
- Kayo Hoshino
- Aki Nagatomi
- Kazumi Nakamura
- Chieko Nakanishi (c)
- Motoko Obayashi
- Ikumi Ogake
- Mika Saiki
- Kiyomi Sakamoto
- Asako Tajimi
- Chiho Torii
- Mika Yamauchi
- Tomoko Yoshihara
- Head coach:
  Kuniaki Yoshida

=== Netherlands ===
- Cintha Boersma (c)
- Erna Brinkman
- Riëtte Fledderus
- Jerine Fleurke
- Marjolein de Jong
- Saskia van Hintum
- Marrit Leenstra
- Elles Leferink
- Irena Machovcak
- Claudia van Thiel
- Ingrid Visser
- Henriëtte Weersing
- Head coach:
  Bert Goedkoop

=== Peru ===
- Luren Baylon
- Milagros Camere (c)
- Leyla Chihuán
- Verónica Contreras
- Yolanda Delgado
- Iris Falcón
- Sara Joya
- Sandra Rodríguez
- Milagros Moy
- Paola Ramos
- Marjorie Vilchez
- Yulissa Zamudio
- Head coach:
  Park Jong-duk

=== Russia ===
#	Name	Club	Date of birth
	Valentina Ogiyenko (c)		May 26, 1965 (age 31)
	Natalya Morozova		January 28, 1973 (age 23)
	Marina Pankova		March 3, 1963 (age 33)
	Yelena Tyurina		April 11, 1971 (age 25)
	Irina Ilchenko		August 3, 1968 (age 27)
	Yelena Godina		September 17, 1977 (age 18)
	Tatyana Menshova		January 27, 1970 (age 26)
	Yevgeniya Artamonova		July 17, 1975 (age 21)
	Yelizaveta Tishchenko		February 7, 1975 (age 21)
	Yuliya Timonova		June 12, 1973 (age 23)
	Tatyana Grachova		February 23, 1973 (age 23)
	Lyubov Sokolova		December 4, 1977 (age 18)

Head coach: Nikolay Karpol

=== South Korea ===
- Chang So-yun
- Chang Yoon-hee (c)
- Choi Kwang-hee
- Chung Sun-hye
- Eoh Yeon-soon
- Hong Ji-yeon
- Kang Hye-mi
- Kim Nam-sun
- Lee In-sook
- Lee Soo-jung
- Park Soo-jeong
- Yoo Yin-kyung
- Head coach:
  Kim Cheol-yong

=== United States ===
- Tara Cross-Battle (c)
- Lori Endicott
- Caren Kemner
- Kristin Klein
- Beverly Oden
- Elaina Oden
- Danielle Scott
- Tammy June Webb
- Paula Weishoff
- Tonya Williams
- Elaine Youngs
- Yoko Zetterlund
- Head coach:
  Terry Liskevych

=== Ukraine ===
- Nataliya Bozhenova (c)
- Yuliya Buyeva
- Olexandra Fomina
- Tetyana Ivanyushkyna
- Olga Kolomiyets
- Alla Kravets
- Olena Kryvonossova
- Vita Mateshik
- Regina Mylosserdova
- Olga Pavlova
- Mariya Polyakova
- Olena Sydorenko
- Head coach:
  Gariy Iegiazarov
