= 2005 Women's European Volleyball Championship squads =

This article shows all participating team squads at the 2005 Women's European Volleyball Championship, held in Pula and Zagreb, Croatia from September 17 to September 22, 2005.

== Pool A ==
=== Azerbaijan ===
- Head coach: Faig Garayev

#	Name	Date of birth	Weight	Height	Spike	Block
2	Kseniya Poznyak	21.11.1986	78	190	300	395
3	Alla Hasanova	06.08.1970	68	183	295	290
4	Oksana Guliyeva	28.07.1984	77	184	300	290
5	Yelena Shabovta	28.08.1969	65	182	288	280
6	Irina Siminyagina	29.11.1984	71	182	295	280
7	Yelena Parkhomenko	11.09.1982	68	186	300	293
8	Natavan Gasimova	08.07.1985	64	176	287	275
9	Natalya Mammadova	02.12.1984	75	195	305	298
10	Oksana Mammadyarova	06.04.1978	66	177	305	290
11	Inessa Korkmaz	17.01.1972	78	190	299	293
12	Valeriya Korotenko	29.01.1984	62	171	260	255
14	Ilaha Aghayeva	19.03.1984	53	169	255	250

=== Croatia ===
- Head coach: Ivica Jelić

#	Name	Date of birth	Weight	Height	Spike	Block
3	Zrinka Zuanović	14.09.1978	67	184	280	270
4	Maria Likhtenstein	07.02.1976	68	179	290	287
7	Marina Katić	01.10.1983	84	183	294	288
8	Barbara Ružić	08.05.1977	71	193	305	300
9	Ilijana Dugandžić	17.04.1981	73	189	300	297
10	Sanja Popović	31.05.1984	68	186	295	285
11	Katarina Barun	01.12.1983	75	189	307	294
12	Vesna Jelić	22.03.1982	63	182	289	280
13	Beti Rimac	14.01.1976	76	192	305	292
14	Patricija Daničić	21.04.1978	75	184	283	277
16	Mia Jerkov	05.12.1982	65	190	304	288
18	Maja Poljak	02.05.1983	73	193	302	290

=== Germany ===
- Head coach: Lee Hee-Wan

#	Name	Date of birth	Weight	Height	Spike	Block
1	Andrea Berg	24.01.1981	71	188	306	299
3	Nadja Jenzewski	02.04.1986	70	174	299	285
4	Kerstin Tzscherlich	15.02.1978	72	179	295	282
5	Dominice Steffen	17.12.1987	70	185	301	290
6	Julia Schlecht	16.03.1980	67	182	298	277
8	Cornelia Dumler	22.01.1982	68	180	309	285
10	Jana Müller	24.05.1978	68	184	314	293
11	Christiane Fürst	29.03.1985	76	192	305	291
12	Olessya Kulakova	31.01.1977	70	190	315	298
13	Regina Burchardt	01.07.1983	65	182	302	294
14	Kathy Radzuweit	02.03.1982	72	196	319	300
15	Angelina Grün	02.12.1979	74	185	309	287

=== Poland ===
- Head coach: Andrzej Niemczyk

#	Name	Date of birth	Weight	Height	Spike	Block
1	Katarzyna Skowrońska	30.06.1983	73	187	305	288
2	Mariola Zenik	03.07.1982	65	175	300	290
4	Izabela Bełcik	29.11.1980	65	185	304	292
5	Magdalena Śliwa	17.11.1969	71	171	292	287
7	Małgorzata Glinka	30.09.1978	84	191	314	303
8	Dorota Świeniewicz	27.07.1972	64	180	315	305
9	Agata Mróz	07.04.1982	74	191	312	301
10	Joanna Mirek	17.02.1977	69	186	314	306
11	Sylwia Pycia	20.04.1981	75	190	309	302
12	Natalia Bamber	24.02.1982	66	187	311	288
13	Milena Rosner	04.01.1980	65	180	307	292
16	Aleksandra Przybysz	02.06.1980	70	180	308	291

=== Romania ===
- Head coach: Florin Grapa

#	Name	Date of birth	Weight	Height	Spike	Block
1	Florentina Nedelcu	26.03.1976	65	178	288	273
2	Elena Butnaru	27.04.1975	66	183	298	280
4	Elena Cozma	06.10.1980	66	170	276	258
5	Carmen Marcovici	20.03.1973	76	190	310	305
6	Mihaela Pachitariu	01.05.1973	62	175	288	273
8	Mihaela Herlea	11.01.1978	75	190	309	299
9	Georgeta Cojocaru	25.07.1981	75	182	298	290
10	Mirela Corjeutanu	06.07.1977	80	190	310	298
11	Maria Ramona Elisei	23.05.1979	72	183	295	287
13	Mariana Hosu	11.09.1980	75	188	298	290
14	Mihaela Truta	18.12.1975	65	182	300	291
18	Nicoleta Tolisteanu	03.12.1980	65	172	276	258

=== Serbia and Montenegro ===
- Head coach: Zoran Terzić

#	Name	Date of birth	Weight	Height	Spike	Block
1	Sanja Starović	25.03.1983	89	195	317	304
3	Ivana Đerisilo	08.08.1983	72	185	306	291
5	Nataša Krsmanović	19.06.1985	70	186	294	273
6	Aleksandra Ranković	08.07.1980	67	187	305	292
7	Brižitka Molnar	28.07.1985	66	182	304	290
10	Maja Ognjenović	06.08.1984	68	183	290	270
11	Vesna Čitaković	03.02.1979	75	187	305	300
13	Maja Simanić	08.02.1980	70	180	280	270
14	Aleksandra Avramović	03.07.1982	80	189	309	295
15	Jelena Nikolić	13.04.1982	75	194	315	300
16	Anja Spasojević	04.07.1983	75	187	308	300
17	Marina Vujović	23.01.1984	58	167	279	257

== Pool B ==
=== Bulgaria ===
- Head coach: Miroslav Zhivkov

#	Name	Date of birth	Weight	Height	Spike	Block
3	Iliyana Gocheva	02.11.1976	69	188	302	294
5	Vyara Hadzhimoskova	18.10.1983	66	186	298	292
6	Tsvetelina Zarkova	18.12.1986	69	187	298	289
7	Martina Georgieva	07.03.1985	71	185	300	288
8	Eva Yaneva	31.07.1985	75	186	298	290
9	Lyubka Debarlieva	21.09.1980	69	178	297	290
12	Vania Sokolova	22.06.1971	79	189	304	298
13	Mariya Filipova	10.09.1982	67	178	290	282
14	Elena Koleva	01.12.1977	75	186	302	295
15	Antonina Zetova	07.09.1973	77	189	306	301
17	Strashimira Filipova	18.08.1985	78	195	307	300
18	Evelina Tsvetanova	22.04.1974	60	176	285	270

=== Italy ===
- Head coach: Marco Bonitta

#	Name	Date of birth	Weight	Height	Spike	Block
1	Simona Gioli	17.09.1977	72	185	307	283
2	Simona Rinieri	01.09.1977	81	188	308	281
3	Elisa Togut	14.05.1978	72	192	320	295
4	Elisa Cella	04.06.1982	72	186	304	286
5	Sara Anzanello	30.07.1980	78	193	316	298
8	Jenny Barazza	24.09.1981	77	188	300	285
9	Nadia Centoni	19.06.1981	63	182	307	291
11	Serena Ortolani	07.01.1987	63	187	308	288
13	Katja Luraschi	06.01.1986	60	187	300	285
14	Eleonora Lo Bianco	22.12.1979	70	172	287	273
15	Antonella Del Core	05.11.1980	73	180	296	279
17	Paola Cardullo	18.03.1982	52	162	298	276

=== Netherlands ===
- Head coach: Avital Selinger

#	Name	Date of birth	Weight	Height	Spike	Block
1	Kim Staelens	07.01.1982	72	182	305	301
3	Francien Huurman	18.04.1975	76	192	320	292
4	Chaïne Staelens	07.11.1980	77	194	316	299
7	Elke Wijnhoven	03.01.1981	62	168	293	282
8	Alice Blom	07.04.1980	64	178	305	270
9	Floortje Meijners	16.01.1987	79	189	309	283
10	Janneke van Tienen	29.05.1979	73	176	293	273
11	Caroline Wensink	04.08.1984	76	186	309	281
12	Manon Flier	08.02.1984	65	191	311	301
14	Riëtte Fledderus	18.10.1977	75	171	288	268
15	Ingrid Visser	04.06.1977	75	191	312	292
16	Debby Stam	24.07.1984	70	184	303	281

=== Russia ===
- Head coach: Giovanni Caprara

#	Name	Date of birth	Weight	Height	Spike	Block
1	Maria Borodakova	08.03.1986	72	190	305	293
2	Olga Sazhina	19.02.1986	71	188	297	292
6	Yelena Godina	17.09.1977	72	196	317	310
7	Natalya Safronova	06.02.1979	68	192	312	305
8	Natalya Kurnosova	11.09.1975	71	191	308	300
9	Natalya Alimova	09.12.1978	78	192	315	308
10	Yekaterina Kabeshova	05.08.1986	66	172	279	270
11	Yekaterina Gamova	17.10.1980	80	202	321	310
12	Marina Sheshenina	26.06.1985	62	181	302	295
13	Maria Zhadan	06.02.1983	68	182	304	300
15	Olga Fateeva	04.05.1984	72	188	310	303
16	Yulia Merkulova	17.02.1984	75	202	317	308

=== Spain ===
- Head coach: Aurenlio Urena

#	Name	Date of birth	Weight	Height	Spike	Block
1	Elena García	12.08.1979	85	187	315	300
4	Maria Teresa Martín	31.03.1981	66	177	302	278
5	Sara Perez	29.11.1980	67	172	278	275
7	Amaranta Fernández	11.08.1983	74	187	301	294
8	Yazmina Hernández	24.04.1984	76	184	293	290
9	Lucia Paraja	10.02.1983	71	186	298	297
10	Yoraxi Melean	01.05.1975	68	178	275	272
11	Jennifer Mendoza	08.03.1984	75	182	285	283
15	Susana Rodríguez	16.08.1976	76	187	310	308
16	Sara González	16.11.1984	78	180	316	314
17	Arkía El-Ammari	09.10.1976	63	176	284	280
18	Esther Rodríguez	29.11.1974	62	172	270	265

=== Turkey ===
- Head coach: Resat Yaziciogullari

#	Name	Date of birth	Weight	Height	Spike	Block
1	Bahar Mert	13.12.1975	61	180	290	286
2	Gülden Kayalar	05.12.1980	52	168	269	275
4	Özlem Özçelik	01.01.1972	74	190	309	300
5	Aysun Özbek	18.03.1977	73	183	303	295
6	Duygu Sipahioğlu	31.10.1979	75	188	300	292
7	Natalia Hanikoğlu	23.06.1975	77	192	304	295
9	Deniz Hakyemez	03.02.1983	72	187	300	295
10	Güldeniz Önal	25.03.1986	63	182	286	274
14	Elif Ağca	10.02.1984	75	186	297	286
15	Eda Erdem	22.06.1987	74	187	298	286
16	Seda Tokatlıoğlu	25.06.1986	70	192	305	294
17	Neslihan Darnel	09.12.1983	72	187	298	292
