= Ukraine women's national volleyball team =

Women's national volleyball team representing Ukraine

Ukraine
- Association: Ukrainian Volleyball Federation (FVU / ФВУ)
- Confederation: CEV
- Head coach: Jakub Głuszak
- FIVB ranking: 16 (24 May 2026)

Uniforms
Home	Away

Summer Olympics
- Appearances: 1 (First in 1996)
- Best result: 11th place (1996)

World Championship
- Appearances: 2 (First in 1994)
- Best result: 9th place (1994)

European Championship
- Appearances: 11 (First in 1993)
- Best result: (bronze) (1993)
Honours
European Championship
Bronze medal – third place	1993 Czech Republic
European League
Gold medal – first place	2017 Finland/Ukraine
Gold medal – first place	2023 Romania/Sweden
Gold medal – first place	2025 Sweden

The Ukraine women's national volleyball team (Ukrainian: Жіноча збірна України з волейболу, Zhinocha zbirna Ukrai'ny z volejbolu) represents Ukraine in international women's volleyball competitions and friendly matches. After the dissolution of the Soviet Union the team first competed on the highest level under its own flag at the 1993 European Championship, winning the bronze medal.

== Results ==
=== Olympic Games ===
Champions Runners-up Third place Fourth place

Summer Olympics record
Year	Round	Position	Pld	W	L	SW	SL	Squad
1964–1992	part of Soviet Union							
(United States) 1996	Group stage	11th	5	0	5	0	15	Squad
(Australia) 2000	did not participate or qualify							
(Greece) 2004	did not participate or qualify							
(China) 2008	did not participate or qualify							
(United Kingdom) 2012	did not participate or qualify							
(Brazil) 2016	did not participate or qualify							
(Japan) 2020	did not participate or qualify							
(France) 2024	did not participate or qualify							
Total	0 titles	1/7	5	0	5	0	15	—

=== World Championship ===
Champions Runners-up Third place Fourth place

World Championship record
Year	Round	Position	Pld	W	L	SW	SL	Squad
1952–1990	part of Soviet Union							
(Brazil) 1994	Group stage	9th	3	1	2	5	8	Squad
(Japan) 1998	did not qualify							
(Germany) 2002	did not qualify							
(Japan) 2006	did not qualify							
(Japan) 2010	did not qualify							
(Italy) 2014	did not qualify							
(Japan) 2018	did not qualify							
(Poland) (Netherlands) 2022	did not qualify							
(Thailand) 2025	Group stage	17th	3	1	2	5	6	Squad
(Canada) (United States) 2027	to be determined							
(Philippines) 2029	to be determined							
Total	0 titles	2/11	6	2	4	10	14	—

=== Nations League ===
Nations League record
Year	Round	Position	GP	MW	ML	SW	SL	Squad
(China) 2018	did not qualify							
(China) 2019	did not qualify							
(Italy) 2021	did not qualify							
(Turkey) 2022	did not qualify							
(United States) 2023	did not qualify							
(Thailand) 2024	did not qualify							
(Poland) 2025	did not qualify							
(Macau) 2026	Preliminary round	16th	12	3	9	18	31	Squad
(N/A) 2027	qualified							
Total	2/9		12	3	9	18	31	—

=== European Championship ===
Champions Runners-up Third place Fourth place

European Championship record
Year	Round	Position	Pld	W	L	SW	SL	Squad
1949–1991	part of Soviet Union							
(Czech Republic) 1993	Semifinal	Third place	7	6	1	20	7	Squad
(Netherlands) 1995	Final round	7th	7	4	3	14	13	Squad
(Czech Republic) 1997	Final round	7th	7	3	4	9	14	Squad
(Italy) 1999	did not qualify							
(Bulgaria) 2001	Semifinal	Fourth place	7	3	4	12	15	Squad
(Turkey) 2003	Group stage	9th	5	2	3	7	12	Squad
(Croatia) 2005	did not qualify							
(Belgium) / (Luxembourg) 2007	did not qualify							
(Poland) 2009	did not qualify							
(Italy) / (Serbia) 2011	Group stage	15th	3	0	3	0	9	Squad
(Germany) / (Switzerland) 2013	did not qualify							
(Netherlands) / (Belgium) 2015	did not qualify							
(Azerbaijan) / (Georgia (country)) 2017	Group stage	13th	3	0	3	5	9	Squad
(Slovakia) / (Hungary) / (Poland) / (Turkey) 2019	Group stage	17th	5	1	4	6	12	Squad
(Serbia) / (Croatia) / (Bulgaria) / (Romania) 2021	Round of 16	12th	6	3	3	10	10	Squad
(Belgium) / (Italy) / (Germany) / (Estonia) 2023	Round of 16	9th	6	3	3	12	10	Squad
(Azerbaijan) / (Czech Republic) / (Sweden) / (Turkey) 2026	Preliminary round	19th	5	1	4	6	12	Squad
(Slovakia) / (Spain) / (N/A) / (N/A) 2028	To be determined							
Total	Qualified: 11/18		61	26	35	101	123	—

=== European League ===
Champions Runners-up Third place Fourth place

European League record
Year	Round	Position	Pld	W	L	SW	SL	Squad
2009	did not participate							
2010	did not participate							
2011	did not participate							
2012	did not participate							
2013	did not participate							
2014	did not participate							
2015	did not participate							
2016	did not participate							
2017	Final	Champions	10	9	1	29	7	Squad
2018	Group stage	8th place	6	2	4	8	13	Squad
2019	Group stage	5th place (tied)	6	4	2	14	6	Squad
2021	Group stage	10th place	4	1	3	4	11	Squad
2022	Group stage	5th place	4	2	2	10	8	Squad
2023	Final	Champions	8	7	1	22	7	Squad
2024	Group stage	5th place	6	4	2	13	9	Squad
2025	Final	Champions	8	7	1	21	7	Squad
Total	3 titles	8/16	52	36	16	121	68	—

== Squads ==
=== 1996 Olympic Games ===
- Nataliya Bozhenova
- Yuliya Buyeva
- Olexandra Fomina
- Tetyana Ivanyushkyna
- Olga Kolomiyets
- Alla Kravets
- Olena Kryvonossova
- Vita Mateshik
- Regina Mylosserdova
- Olga Pavlova
- Mariya Polyakova
- Olena Sydorenko
- Head coach:
  Gariy Yegiazarov

=== 2001 European Championship ===
- Alla Kravets
- Mariya Aleksandrova
- Alexandra Fomina
- Olena Sydorenko
- Tetyana Ivanyushkina
- Regina Miloserdova
- Irina Zhukova
- Olena Yena
- Tetyana Voronina
- Yuliya Shelukhina
- Nataliya Bozhenova
- Maryna Martsynyuk
- Head coach:
  Gariy Yegiazarov
