= Anca Popescu =

Romanian volleyball player (born 1976)

Personal information
- Nationality: Romanian
- Born: 21 February 1976 (age 50)
- Height: 1.82 m (6 ft 0 in)

Volleyball information
- Position: middle blocker
- Current club: TV Fischbek
- Number: 15 (national team)

National team
2002	Romania

Anca Popescu (born 21 February 1976) is a retired Romanian female volleyball player, who played as a middle blocker.

She was part of the Romania women's national volleyball team at the 2002 FIVB Volleyball Women's World Championship in Germany. On club level she played with TV Fischbek.

== Clubs ==
- TV Fischbek (2002)
