= Milanov =

Milanov (Bulgarian: Миланов; feminine: Milanova) is a Slavic masculine surname originating from the root mil-, meaning 'dear', 'cute'. Notable people with the surname include:

- Anna Milanova (born 1978), Bulgarian volleyball player
- Dimitar Milanov (1928–1995), Bulgarian footballer
- Georgi Milanov (footballer) (born 1992), Bulgarian footballer
- Georgi Milanov (ice hockey) (1952–2014), Bulgarian ice hockey player
- Iliya Milanov (born 1992), Bulgarian footballer
- Kiril Milanov (1948–2011), Bulgarian footballer
- Philip Milanov (born 1991), Belgian discus thrower
- Rossen Milanov, Bulgarian conductor
- Stoika Milanova (1945–2024), Bulgarian classical violinist
- Tamara Gachechiladze, married Milanova (born 1983), Georgian singer
- Vanya Milanova (born 1954), Bulgarian violinist
- Yordan Milanov (architect) (1867–1932), Bulgarian architect
- Yordan Milanov (officer) (1924–2020), Bulgarian military officer
- Zhivko Milanov (born 1984), Bulgarian footballer
- Zinka Milanov (1906–1989), Croatian opera singer
