= Andreea Constantinescu =

Romanian volleyball player (born 1977)

Andreea-Florina Constantinescu

Personal information
- Nationality: Romanian
- Born: 14 June 1977 (age 49)
- Hometown: Craiova
- Height: 1.81 m (5 ft 11 in)
- Weight: 68 kg (150 lb)
- Spike: 298 cm (117 in)
- Block: 289 cm (114 in)

Volleyball information
- Current club: VC Unic Piatra Neamt
- Number: 9 (national team)

National team
| 2002 | Romania |

Andreea-Florina Constantinescu (born 14 June 1977) is a retired Romanian female volleyball player.

She was part of the Romania women's national volleyball team at the 2002 FIVB Volleyball Women's World Championship in Germany. On club level she played with VC Unic Piatra Neamt.

== Clubs ==
- VC Unic Piatra Neamt (2002)
