= Serafimov =

Serafimov (Bulgarian: Серафимов, Russian: Серафимов) is a Slavic masculine surname, its feminine counterpart is Serafimova. Notable people with the name include:

- Emiliya Serafimova (born 1976), Bulgarian volleyball player
- Ivan Serafimov (1956–2000), Bulgarian criminal
- Martin Serafimov (born 2000), Macedonian handball player
- Nikola Serafimov (born 1999), Macedonian footballer
- Tanko Serafimov (1942–2013), Bulgarian architect
- Vadim Serafimov (born 1949), Russian diplomat

== See also ==
- Serafimovski, surname
