= Dominika Smereka =

Polish volleyball player (born 1974)

Personal information
- Full name: Dominika Leśniewicz-Smereka
- Nationality: Polish
- Born: 13 January 1974 (age 52)
- Height: 1.74 m (5 ft 9 in)

Volleyball information
- Position: libero
- Current club: Palac Bydgoszcz
- Number: 13 (national team)

National team
2001-2007	Poland

Dominika Leśniewicz-Smereka (born 13 January 1974) is a retired Polish volleyball and beach volleyball player, who played as a libero.

She was part of the Poland women's national volleyball team at the 2002 FIVB Volleyball Women's World Championship in Germany. On club level she played with Palac Bydgoszcz.

She played beach volleyball with Izabela Rutkowska in 2000.

== Clubs ==
- Palac Bydgoszcz (2002)
