= Elena Kunova =

Bulgarian volleyball player (born 1975)

Personal information
- Nationality: Bulgaria
- Born: 5 November 1975 (age 50)
- Height: 1.87 m (6 ft 2 in)
- Weight: 73 kg (161 lb)
- Spike: 304 cm (120 in)
- Block: 298 cm (117 in)

Elena Kunova (born November 5, 1975), is a Bulgarian volleyball player.

She participated at the 2002 FIVB Volleyball Women's World Championship in Germany. As of 2002, she plays for Vilsbiburg RR.
