= Luminița Trombițaș =

Romanian volleyball player (born 1971)

Luminita-Gabriela Trombitas

Personal information
- Nationality: Romanian
- Born: 5 July 1971 (age 55)
- Height: 1.82 m (6 ft 0 in)

Volleyball information
- Position: setter
- Current club: Petrarca Padua
- Number: 3 (national team)

National team
2002	Romania

Luminita-Gabriela Trombitas (born 5 July 1971) is a retired Romanian female volleyball player, who played as a setter. She was part of the Romania women's national volleyball team at the 2002 FIVB Volleyball Women's World Championship in Germany. On club level she played with Petrarca Padua.

== Clubs ==
2002-2003 - A2 Sartori Mercedes Padova

2001-2002 - A2 Sartori Mercedes Padova

2000-2001 - A1 Rio Marsì Palermo

1999-2000 - A1 Rio Marsì Palermo

1998-1999 - A Rapid Bucarest (ROM)

1997-1998 - A Jedintsvo Uzice (YUG)
