= Marina Marik =

Bulgarian volleyball player (born 1969)

Personal information
- Full name: Marina Marik-Georgieva
- Nationality: Bulgaria
- Born: 17 August 1969 (age 57)
- Height: 1.80 m (5 ft 11 in)
- Weight: 67 kg (148 lb)
- Spike: 291 cm (115 in)
- Block: 285 cm (112 in)

Volleyball information
- Position: libero

Marina Marik-Georgieva (Bulgarian: Марина Марик-Георгиева; born August 17, 1969), is a Bulgarian former volleyball player.

She participated at the 2002 FIVB Volleyball Women's World Championship in Germany. She used to play for Levski Siconco in her country.
