= Katerina Jenckova =

Czech volleyball player (born 1971)

Personal information
- Nationality: Czech
- Born: 18 May 1971 (age 55)
- Height: 1.80 m (5 ft 11 in)
- Weight: 65
- Spike: 311
- Block: 311

Volleyball information
- Current club: PSG Athens
- Number: 11 (national team)

National team
2002	Czech Republic

Katerina Jenckova (born 18 May 1971) is a retired Czech female volleyball player. She was part of the Czech Republic women's national volleyball team.

She participated at the 2002 FIVB Volleyball Women's World Championship in Germany. On club level she played with PSG Athens.

== Clubs ==
- PSG Athens (2002)
