= Liu Xiaoning =

Chinese volleyball player

Personal information
- Nationality: Chinese
- Born: 14 July 1975 (age 51); Qingdao, Shandong, China
- Height: 1.82 m (6 ft 0 in)
- Weight: 75 kg (165 lb)
- Spike: 310 cm (120 in)
- Block: 300 cm (120 in)

Volleyball information
- Position: Middle blocker
- Number: 9

Career
Years	Teams
1987	Nanjing Military Region

National team
1995–1996	China
Honours
Women's volleyball
Representing China
Olympic Games
Silver medal – second place	1996 Atlanta	Team

Liu Xiaoning (simplified Chinese: 刘晓宁; traditional Chinese: 劉曉寧; pinyin: líu xiǎo níng; born 14 July 1975) is a Chinese former volleyball player, a member of the China women's national volleyball team from 1995 to 2001. She was part of the Chinese national team that won the silver medal at the 1996 Summer Olympics in Atlanta.
