= Carmen Danoiu =

Romanian volleyball player (born 1979)

Personal information
- Nationality: Romanian
- Born: 1 November 1979 (age 46)

Volleyball information
- Position: Opposite
- Number: 16 (national team)

National team
2001	Romania

Carmen Danoiu (born 1 November 1979) is a Romanian female former volleyball player, playing as an opposite. She was part of the Romania women's national volleyball team.

She competed at the 2001 Women's European Volleyball Championship.
