= Mihaela Albu =

Romanian volleyball player (born 1994)

Mihaela Manole (Albu)

Personal information
- Nickname: Misha
- Nationality: Romania
- Born: 1 January 1994 (age 32); Medgidia, Romania
- Hometown: Medgidia
- Height: 1.70 m (5 ft 7 in)

Volleyball information
- Position: Libero
- Current club: CSM Constanța
- Number: 6 (club and national team)

National team
2015	Romania
- Last updated: 7 January 2017

Mihaela Manole (Albu) (born 1 January 1994) is a Romanian female volleyball player. She was part of the Romania women's national volleyball team.

She competed at the 2015 European Games and 2015 Women's European Volleyball Championship. On club level she plays for CS Medgidia.

== Clubs ==
- (Romania) VC Unic Piatra Neamț (2009–2013)
- (Romania) CS Știința Bacău (2013–2018)
- (Romania) CS Medgidia (2018–2022)
- (Romania) CS Rapid Bucuresti ( 2022–2023 )
- (Romania) CSM Constanța (2023-2026)
