= Vania Beccaria =

Italian volleyball player (born 1973)

Personal information
- Nationality: Italian
- Born: 24 July 1973 (age 53)
- Height: 2 m (6 ft 7 in)

Volleyball information
- Number: 4 (national team)

Career
- Years: Team
- 1994: Latte Rugiada Matera

National team
- Years: Team
- 1994-2001: Italy

Vania Beccaria (born 24 July 1973) is a retired Italian female volleyball player. She was part of the Italy women's national volleyball team.

She participated in the 1994 FIVB Volleyball Women's World Championship. She played at the 1997 Women's European Volleyball Championship and 2001 Women's European Volleyball Championship squads. On club level she played with Latte Rugiada Matera.

== Clubs ==
- Latte Rugiada Matera (1994)
