= Milada Spalová =

Czech volleyball player (born 1979)

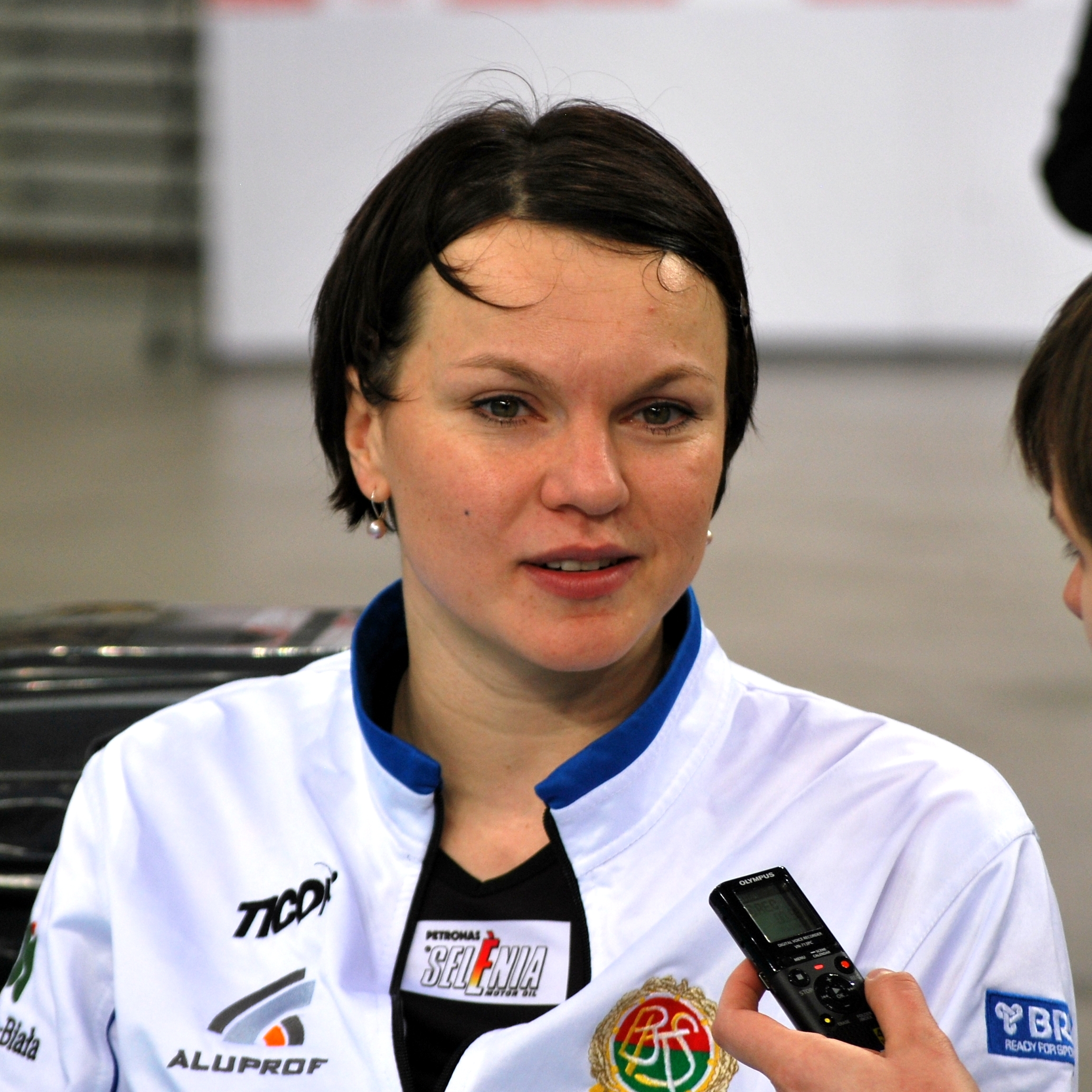
- Milada Bergrová

Personal information
- Full name: Milada Bergrová
- Nationality: Czech
- Born: 16 November 1979 (age 46); Přerov, Czechoslovakia
- Height: 1.89 m (6 ft 2 in)
- Weight: 75
- Spike: 311
- Block: 294

Volleyball information
- Position: Blocker

Career
Years	Teams
1992–95	PNDVK Přerov
1995–2003	SK UP Olomouc
2003–04	ASPTT Mulhouse
2004–05	RC Villebon 91
2005–06	Eczacıbaşı VitrA
2006–08	Calisia Kalisz
2008–12	VK Prostějov
2012–13	BKS Bielsko-Biała
2018	VK Brno

National team
2001–07	Czech Republic

Milada Spalová (born 16 November 1979), married Milada Bergrová, is a Czech retired volleyball player. She was part of the Czech Republic women's national volleyball team.

== Career ==
Spalová started her career in local club in Přerov before moving to play in nearby Olomouc, where she made an impression and got a call for the national team, participating in the 2001 European Championship and the 2002 World Championship. Between 2003 and 2008 Spalová played in France, Turkey and Poland, winning the championship in both Turkey and Poland, as well as the Polish Cup and Supercup. In 2008 Spalová returned to play in the Czech League for VK Prostějov, with whom she won the league championship and national cup in 2009 and 2010. In 2010 she married Tomáš Berger, adopting the name Milada Bergrová, and continued to play with Prostějov, as the club won two further doubles, eventually retiring in 2012. In 2018 Bergrová returned to play for Extraliga club VK Brno.

== Honours ==
- Turkish championship (1): 2005–06
- Polish championship (1): 2006–07
- Polish Cup (1): 2006–07
- Polish supercup (1): 2006–07
- Czech championship (4): 2008–09, 2009–10, 2010–11, 2011–12
- Czech Cup (4): 2008–09, 2009–10, 2010–11, 2011–12
