= Anca Bergmann =

Romanian volleyball player (born 1976)

Personal information
- Nationality: Romanian
- Born: 21 February 1976
- Died: 16 September 2022 (aged 46)
- Height: 182 cm (72 in)
- Spike: 305 cm (120 in)
- Block: 295 cm (116 in)

Volleyball information
- Position: Middle-blocker
- Number: 15 (national team)

National team
2001	Romania

Anca Bergmann (21 February 1976 – 16 September 2022) was a Romanian volleyball player, playing as a middle-blocker. She was part of the Romania women's national volleyball team.

She competed at the 2001 Women's European Volleyball Championship.

Later, she worked as a schoolteacher in Hamburg and died on 16 September 2022 after a long illness.
