= Florentina Nedelcu =

Romanian volleyball player (born 1976)

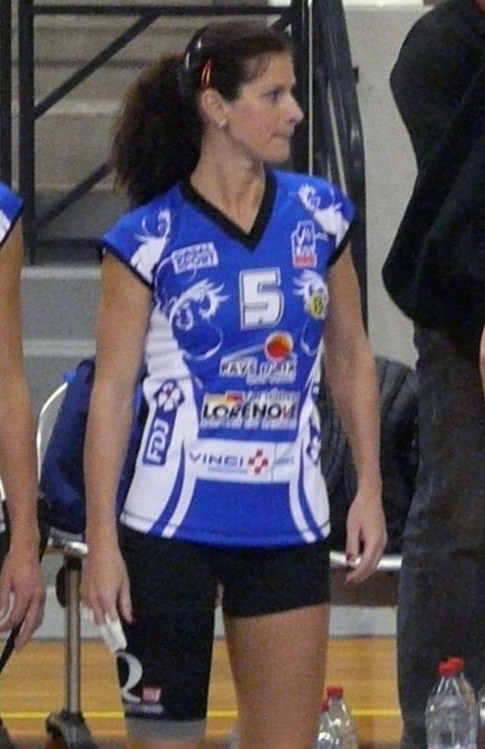
- Florentina Nedelcu

Personal information
- Nationality: Romanian
- Born: 26 March 1976 (age 50)
- Height: 1.77 m (5 ft 10 in)

Volleyball information
- Position: wing spiker
- Current club: VC Unic Piatra Neamt
- Number: 17 (national team)

National team
2002-2005	Romania

Florentina Nedelcu (born 26 March 1976) is a retired Romanian female volleyball player, who played as a wing spiker.

She was part of the Romania women's national volleyball team at the 2002 FIVB Volleyball Women's World Championship in Germany, and 2005 Women's European Volleyball Championship. On club level she played with VC Unic Piatra Neamt.

== Clubs ==
- VC Unic Piatra Neamt (2002)
