= Serafimovski =

Serafimovski (Macedonian: Серафимовски) is a surname of Macedonian origin. Notable people with the surname include:

- Ivica Serafimovski (born 1973), Macedonian Orthodox bishop
- Tome Serafimovski (1935–2016), Macedonian sculptor
- Žarko Serafimovski (born 1971), Macedonian footballer

== See also ==
- Serafimov, surname
