= Jolanda Elshof =

Dutch volleyball player (born 1975)

Personal information
- Nationality: Dutch
- Born: 5 August 1975 (age 51); Soest, Netherlands
- Height: 184 cm (6 ft)

Volleyball information
- Number: 14 (national team)

Career
Years	Teams
1994	Avero O.Sneek

National team
1994-1995	Netherlands

Jolanda Elshof (born 5 August 1975) is a retired Dutch female volleyball player. She was part of the Netherlands women's national volleyball team.

She participated in the 1994 FIVB Volleyball Women's World Championship, and won the European title at the 1995 Women's European Volleyball Championship. On club level she played with Avero O.Sneek.

== Clubs ==
- Avero O.Sneek (1994)
