= Jana Havlová =

Czech volleyball player (born 1978)

Jana Havlisová (born 27 May 1978) is a retired Czech female volleyball player. She was part of the Czech Republic women's national volleyball team.

She participated at the 2002 FIVB Volleyball Women's World Championship in Germany. On club level she played with Olymp Prague.

== Clubs ==
- Olymp Prague (2001)
