= Fidanka Saparefska =

Greek volleyball player (born 1975)

Personal information
- Nationality: Greek
- Born: 9 November 1975 (age 50)
- Height: 1.81 m (5 ft 11 in)

Volleyball information
- Position: middle blocker
- Current club: Panathinaikos Athen
- Number: 5 (national team)

National team
| 2001-2002 | Greece |

Fidanka Saparefska (born 9 November 1975) is a retired Greek female volleyball player, who played as a middle blocker. She was part of the Greece women's national volleyball team at the 2001 Women's European Volleyball Championship and 2002 FIVB Volleyball Women's World Championship in Germany. On club level she played with Panathinaikos Athen.

== Clubs ==
- Panathinaikos Athen (2002)
