= Mirela Corjeuțanu =

Romanian volleyball player (born 1977)

Mirela Corjeutanu

Personal information
- Nationality: Romanian
- Born: 6 July 1977 (age 49)
- Height: 1.90 m (6 ft 3 in)

Volleyball information
- Position: universal
- Current club: Futura Volley Sanarate
- Number: 10 (national team)

National team
2001-2005	Romania

Mirela Corjeutanu (born 6 July 1977) is a retired Romanian female volleyball player, who played as a universal.

Corjeutanu competed at the 2001 Women's European Volleyball Championship, 2003 Women's European Volleyball Championship and 2005 Women's European Volleyball Championship. She was part of the Romania women's national volleyball team at the 2002 FIVB Volleyball Women's World Championship in Germany. At the club level she played with Futura Volley Sanarate.
