= Carmen Marcovici =

Romanian volleyball player (born 1973)

Carmen-Alida Marcovici

Personal information
- Nationality: Romanian
- Born: 20 March 1973 (age 53)
- Hometown: Bucharest
- Height: 1.90 m (6 ft 3 in)
- Weight: 76 kg (168 lb)
- Spike: 309 cm (122 in)
- Block: 299 cm (118 in)

Volleyball information
- Position: middle blocker
- Number: 5 (national team)

Career
Years	Teams
2002	Boavista Porto

National team
1994-2005	Romania

Carmen-Alida Cioroianu Marcovici (born 20 March 1973) is a retired Romanian female volleyball player, who played as a middle blocker.

She participated at the 1994 FIVB Volleyball Women's World Championship in Brazil, and was part of the Romania women's national volleyball team at the 2002 FIVB Volleyball Women's World Championship in Germany and 2005 Women's European Volleyball Championship. On club level she played with Boavista Porto.

== Clubs ==
- Universitatea Craiova (1994)
- Boavista Porto (2002)
