= Anna Vania Mello =

Italian volleyball player (born 1979)

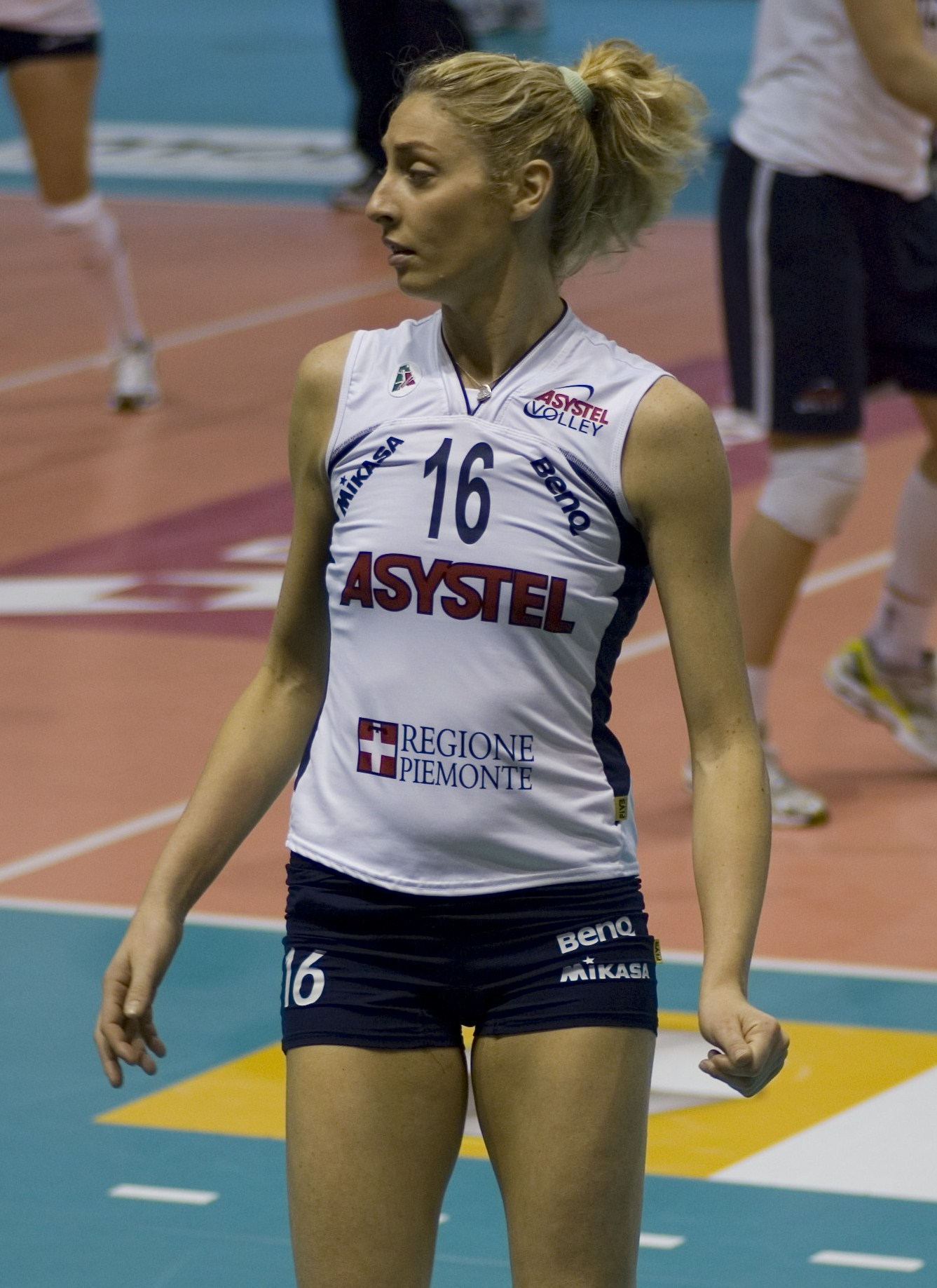

Personal information
- Full name: Anna Vania Mello
- Nationality: Italian
- Born: 27 February 1979 (age 47); Italy
- Height: 1.83 m (6 ft 0 in)
- Weight: 72 kg (159 lb)
- Spike: 310 cm (120 in)
- Block: 278 cm (109 in)

Volleyball information
- Position: Middle-blocker
- Number: 16

National team
| 1996 – 2002 | (Italy) |
Honours
Women's volleyball
Representing Italy
World Championship
| Gold medal – first place | 2002 Germany | Team competition |
|}

Anna Vania Mello (born 27 February 1979) is a volleyball player from Italy, who claimed the gold medal with the Women's National Team at the 2002 World Championship in Germany. There she played as a middle-blocker, wearing the number #16 jersey. Vania Mello also competed at the 2000 Summer Olympics.

== Honours ==
- 2000 Olympic Games — 9th place
- 2000 FIVB World Grand Prix — 7th place
- 2001 European Championship — 2nd place
- 2002 World Championship — 1st place
