= Elena Butnaru =

Romanian volleyball player (born 1975)

Personal information
- Nationality: Romania
- Born: 27 April 1975 (age 51)
- Hometown: Bucuresti
- Height: 1.83 m (6 ft 0 in)
- Weight: 66 kg (146 lb)
- Spike: 301 cm (9 ft 11 in)
- Block: 290 cm (9 ft 6 in)

Volleyball information
- Number: 2 (club and national team)

National team
2002	Romania

Elena Butnaru (born 27 April 1975) is a retired Romanian female volleyball player, who played as a middle blocker.

She was part of the Romania women's national volleyball team at the 2002 FIVB Volleyball Women's World Championship in Germany. She also competed at the 2001 Women's European Volleyball Championship and 2005 Women's European Volleyball Championship. On club level she played with Pallavolo Palermo.

== Clubs ==
- (Romania) 1997-1999 Pitesti
- (Romania) 1998-2000 Krajova
- (Italy) 1999-2000 Rio Marsì Palermo
- (Italy) 2000-2001 Rio Marsì Palermo
- (Italy) 2001-2002 Pallavolo Palermo
- (Spain) 2002-2003 Damesa Burgos
- (Italy) 2003-2004 Scavolini Pesaro
- (Spain) 2004-2006 Las Palmas
- (Spain) 2006-2007 Valencia
- (Spain) 2007-2009 CV Sanse
- (Italy) 2009-2010 Chateau d'Ax Urbino Volley
