= Ivica Jelić =

Croatian volleyball player and coach (born 1952)

Personal information
- Nationality: Croatian
- Born: 10 August 1952 (age 73) Vranje, Yugoslavia

Sport
- Sport: Volleyball

Ivica Jelić (born 10 August 1952) is a Croatian volleyball player and coach. He competed in the men's tournament at the 1980 Summer Olympics. He is the father of Barbara Jelić-Ružić and Vesna Jelić.
