= Dragana Marinković =

Serbian volleyball player (born 1982)

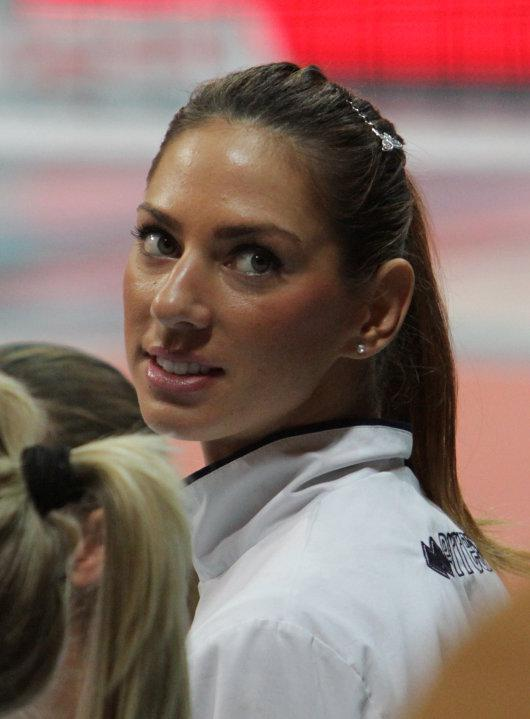

Personal information
- Nationality: Serbian
- Born: 19 October 1982 (age 44)
- Height: 1.97 m (6 ft 5 1/2 in)
- Weight: 78 kg (172 lb)
- Spike: 325 cm (128 in)
- Block: 310 cm (120 in)

Volleyball information
- Position: Middleblock

National team
2001 - 2010	Serbia

Dragana Marinković (born 19 October 1982) is a Serbian professional volleyball player who competed for the Croatian and Serbian women's national teams in the 2000s. She is 1.97 m (6 ft 5 1/2 in) tall. Marinković has played for seven seasons in the Italian Serie A. In the season 2009/2010, she moved to Pesaro.

== Sources ==
- (in Italian)
- (in Serbian)
