= Emil Trenev =

Bulgarian volleyball player and coach

Medal record

Coach for women's volleyball

Representing Bulgaria

European Championship
Bronze medal – third place	2001 Varna	Team

Emil Trenev (Bulgarian: Емил Тренев; born 12 September 1948) is an international volleyball coach from Bulgaria who won the bronze medal at the 2001 Women's European Volleyball Championship as Head Coach with the Bulgarian Team. He is also a former Bulgarian volleyball player who played the Munich 1972 Summer Olympics and ranked 4th.
