= Vita Mateshuk =

Ukrainian volleyball player (born 1969)

Personal information
- Nationality: Ukrainian
- Born: 12 February 1969 (age 57)
- Height: 178 cm (5 ft 10 in)

Volleyball information

Career
- Years: Team
- 1994: Orbita Zaporizhya

National team
- Years: Team
- 1994-1996: Ukraine
Honours
Women's volleyball
Representing Ukraine
European Championship
Bronze medal – third place	1993 Brno-Zlin	Team

Victoria Victorіvna Mateshuk (Lysechko) Ukrainian: Вікторія Вікторівна Матешук (Лисечко) (born 12 February 1969) is a retired Soviet and Ukrainian female volleyball player.

She was part of the Soviet Union women's national under-20 volleyball team at the 1988 Women's Junior European Volleyball Championship.

She was part of the Ukraine women's national volleyball team at the 1996 Summer Olympics, and at the 1994 FIVB Women's Volleyball World Championship. On club level she played with Orbita Zaporizhya.

== Clubs ==
- Orbita Zaporizhya (1994)
