= 1998 FIVB Women's Volleyball World Championship =

Volleyball competition held in Japan

1998 FIVB Women's World Championship
バレーボール女子世界選手権 日本 1998

Tournament details
- Host country: Japan
- Dates: 3–12 November
- Teams: 16
- Venues: 7 (in 7 host cities)
- Officially opened by: Akihito

Final positions
- Champions: Cuba (3rd title)
- Runners-up: China
- Third place: Russia
- Fourth place: Brazil

Tournament awards
- MVP: (Cuba) Regla Torres
- Best Setter: (Italy) Maurizia Cacciatori
- Best OH: (Cuba) Yumilka Ruiz; (China) Sun Yue
- Best MB: (Cuba) Regla Torres; (China) Wu Yongmei
- Best OPP: (China) Qui Aihua

The 1998 FIVB Women's World Championship was the thirteenth edition of the tournament, organized by the world's governing body, the FIVB. It was held from 3 to 12 November 1998 in Tokyo, Tokuyama, Matsumoto, Kagoshima, Nagoya, Fukuoka, and Osaka, Japan.

== Qualification ==
Team	Confederation	Qualified as	Qualified on	Appearance in finals
Japan	AVC	Host		11th
China	AVC	AVC Pool B Winner	29 June 1997	9th
South Korea	AVC	AVC Pool C Winner	6 July 1997	8th
Russia	CEV	CEV Pool D Winner	14 September 1997	12th^{1}
Bulgaria	CEV	CEV Pool H Winner	14 September 1997	9th
Thailand	AVC	AVC Playoff Winner	18 September 1997	1st
Netherlands	CEV	CEV Pool E Winner	21 September 1997	9th
Brazil	CSV	CSV Pool K Winner	2 November 1997	11th
Peru	CSV	CSV Pool K Runner-up	2 November 1997	10th
Cuba	NORCECA	NORCECA Pool I Winner	9 November 1997	8th
Germany	CEV	CEV Pool G Winner	4 January 1998	10th^{2}
Croatia	CEV	CEV Pool F Winner	11 January 1998	1st
Italy	CEV	CEV Playoff Winner	1 February 1998	6th
United States	NORCECA	NORCECA Pool J Winner	1 February 1998	11th
Kenya	CAVB	CAVB Pool A Winner	1 March 1998	2nd
Dominican Republic	NORCECA	NORCECA Playoff Winner	14 March 1998	3rd

1.Competed as Soviet Union from 1952 to 1990; 2nd appearance as Russia.
2.Competed as West Germany from 1956 to 1990; 2nd appearance as Germany.

Source:Official website

== Venues ==
Pool A	Host cities in Japan	
Tokyo	Host cities in Japan	
National Yoyogi Stadium	Host cities in Japan	
Capacity: 12,000	Host cities in Japan	
Final round	Pool E	Pool C
Osaka	Nagoya	Matsumoto
Osaka Chuo Gymnasium	Nagoya Rainbow Hall	Matsumoto City Gymnasium
Capacity: 10,000	Capacity: 9,000	Capacity: 6,000
Pool D	Pool F	Pool B
Kagoshima	Fukuoka	Tokuyama
Kagoshima Arena	Marine Messe Fukuoka	Tokuyama City Sports Center
Capacity: 5,000	Capacity: 9,000	Capacity: 5,000

== Format ==
The tournament was played in three different stages (the first, second, and final rounds). In the First Round, the 16 participants were divided into four groups of four teams each. A single round-robin format was played within each group to determine the teams' group position; the three best teams of each group (a total of 12 teams) progressed to the next round. In the Second round, the 12 teams were divided into two groups of six teams. A single round-robin format was played within each group to determine the teams' group position; matches already played between teams in the First round were counted in this round. The four best teams of each group (a total of 8 teams) progressed to the next round (group winners and runners-up to 1st–4th place semifinals and group thirds and fourths to 5th–8th place semifinals). The Final round was played in a single elimination format and consisted of two sets of semifinals and finals (one to determine 1st–4th places and the other for 5th–8th places). For the tournament's final standings, teams that did not reach placement matches were allocated as:

- The four teams finishing 4th in each First round pool were ranked 13th.
- The two teams finishing 6th in each Second round pool were ranked 11th.
- The two teams finishing 5th in each Second round pool were ranked 9th.

== Pools composition ==
The drawing of lots took place on 20 April 1998 in Tokyo, Japan. Teams were seeded in the first two positions of each pool following the Serpentine system according to their FIVB World Ranking. FIVB reserved the right to seed the hosts as head of Pool A regardless of the World Ranking. All teams not seeded were drawn to take other available positions in the remaining lines. The number after the team's name reflect its FIVB World Ranking in October 1998.

Pool A	Pool B	Pool C	Pool D
Japan (6)	Cuba (1)	Russia (2)	China (3)
Netherlands (8)	United States (7)	Brazil (5)	South Korea (4)
Peru (12)	Italy (9)	Germany (13)	Croatia (10)
Kenya (19)	Bulgaria (13)	Dominican Republic (15)	Thailand (22)

== Results ==
All times are Japan Standard Time (UTC+09:00).

=== First round ===
==== Pool A ====
Venue: National Yoyogi Stadium, Tokyo

Pos	Team	Pld	W	L	Pts	SW	SL	SR	SPW	SPL	SPR	Qualification
1	Japan	3	3	0	6	9	0	MAX	135	55	2.455	Second round
2	Netherlands	3	2	1	5	6	3	2.000	118	82	1.439	Second round
3	Peru	3	1	2	4	3	8	0.375	104	153	0.680	Second round
4	Kenya	3	0	3	3	2	9	0.222	87	154	0.565	

Date	Time		Score		Set 1	Set 2	Set 3	Set 4	Set 5	Total
3 Nov	14:00	Netherlands	3–0	Kenya	15–7	15–1	15–6			45–14
3 Nov	19:15	Peru	0–3	Japan	8–15	6–15	3–15			17–45
4 Nov	15:30	Netherlands	3–0	Peru	15–3	15–6	16–14			46–23
4 Nov	18:30	Kenya	0–3	Japan	5–15	4–15	2–15			11–45
5 Nov	15:30	Peru	3–2	Kenya	15–9	13–15	6–15	15–10	15–13	64–62
5 Nov	18:30	Japan	3–0	Netherlands	15–9	15–12	15–6			45–27

==== Pool B ====
Venue: Tokuyama City Sports Center, Tokuyama

Pos	Team	Pld	W	L	Pts	SW	SL	SR	SPW	SPL	SPR	Qualification
1	Cuba	3	3	0	6	9	1	9.000	148	89	1.663	Second round
2	Italy	3	2	1	5	6	3	2.000	117	87	1.345	Second round
3	Bulgaria	3	1	2	4	4	6	0.667	110	126	0.873	Second round
4	United States	3	0	3	3	0	9	0.000	62	135	0.459	

Date	Time		Score		Set 1	Set 2	Set 3	Set 4	Set 5	Total
3 Nov	14:00	Bulgaria	0–3	Italy	12–15	10–15	6–15			28–45
3 Nov	18:30	Cuba	3–0	United States	15–7	15–8	15–10			45–25
4 Nov	15:00	Italy	3–0	United States	15–7	15–4	15–3			45–14
4 Nov	18:00	Bulgaria	1–3	Cuba	15–13	6–15	8–15	8–15		37–58
5 Nov	15:00	Cuba	3–0	Italy	15–7	15–9	15–11			45–27
5 Nov	18:00	United States	0–3	Bulgaria	3–15	7–15	13–15			23–45

==== Pool C ====
Venue: Matsumoto City Gymnasium, Matsumoto

Pos	Team	Pld	W	L	Pts	SW	SL	SR	SPW	SPL	SPR	Qualification
1	Russia	3	3	0	6	9	0	MAX	135	54	2.500	Second round
2	Brazil	3	2	1	5	6	3	2.000	114	62	1.839	Second round
3	Dominican Republic	3	1	2	4	3	8	0.375	76	152	0.500	Second round
4	Germany	3	0	3	3	2	9	0.222	88	145	0.607	

Date	Time		Score		Set 1	Set 2	Set 3	Set 4	Set 5	Total
3 Nov	14:00	Germany	2–3	Dominican Republic	15–1	11–15	6–15	15–7	15–17	62–55
3 Nov	18:30	Russia	3–0	Brazil	15–7	15–6	15–11			45–24
4 Nov	13:30	Dominican Republic	0–3	Brazil	1–15	4–15	4–15			9–45
4 Nov	16:00	Germany	0–3	Russia	8–15	4–15	6–15			18–45
5 Nov	13:30	Russia	3–0	Dominican Republic	15–3	15–8	15–1			45–12
5 Nov	16:00	Brazil	3–0	Germany	15–1	15–4	15–3			45–8

==== Pool D ====
Venue: Kagoshima Arena, Kagoshima

Pos	Team	Pld	W	L	Pts	SW	SL	SR	SPW	SPL	SPR	Qualification
1	South Korea	3	3	0	6	9	4	2.250	169	153	1.105	Second round
2	China	3	2	1	5	8	5	1.600	178	129	1.380	Second round
3	Croatia	3	1	2	4	7	6	1.167	160	159	1.006	Second round
4	Thailand	3	0	3	3	0	9	0.000	69	135	0.511	

Date	Time		Score		Set 1	Set 2	Set 3	Set 4	Set 5	Total
3 Nov	14:00	South Korea	3–2	Croatia	15–12	9–15	15–12	7–15	15–11	61–65
3 Nov	18:30	China	3–0	Thailand	15–9	15–2	15–5			45–16
4 Nov	13:00	Croatia	2–3	China	15–9	5–15	4–15	15–12	11–15	50–66
4 Nov	16:00	South Korea	3–0	Thailand	15–0	15–11	15–10			45–21
5 Nov	13:00	Croatia	3–0	Thailand	15–9	15–13	15–10			45–32
5 Nov	16:00	China	2–3	South Korea	13–15	15–17	15–6	15–10	9–15	67–63

=== Second round ===
The results and the points of the matches between the same teams that were already played during the first round are taken into account for the second round.

==== Pool E ====
Venue: Nagoya Rainbow Hall, Nagoya

Pos	Team	Pld	W	L	Pts	SW	SL	SR	SPW	SPL	SPR	Qualification
1	Russia	5	5	0	10	15	1	15.000	241	106	2.274	Finals
2	Brazil	5	4	1	9	12	3	4.000	204	107	1.907	Finals
3	Japan	5	3	2	8	10	6	1.667	193	164	1.177	5th–8th places
4	Netherlands	5	2	3	7	6	9	0.667	149	176	0.847	5th–8th places
5	Peru	5	1	4	6	3	14	0.214	136	247	0.551	
6	Dominican Republic	5	0	5	5	2	15	0.133	119	242	0.492	

Date	Time		Score		Set 1	Set 2	Set 3	Set 4	Set 5	Total
7 Nov	12:30	Dominican Republic	2–3	Peru	15–9	12–15	13–15	15–8	11–15	66–62
7 Nov	15:00	Brazil	3–0	Netherlands	15–5	15–7	15–3			45–15
7 Nov	18:00	Japan	1–3	Russia	17–16	7–15	5–15	8–15		37–60
8 Nov	12:30	Netherlands	3–0	Dominican Republic	15–8	15–3	15–7			45–18
8 Nov	15:00	Russia	3–0	Peru	15–2	15–9	15–6			45–17
8 Nov	18:00	Brazil	3–0	Japan	15–10	15–4	15–7			45–21
9 Nov	13:00	Netherlands	0–3	Russia	9–15	5–15	2–15			16–45
9 Nov	15:30	Brazil	3–0	Peru	15–5	15–5	15–7			45–17
9 Nov	18:30	Dominican Republic	0–3	Japan	1–15	13–15	0–15			14–45

==== Pool F ====
Venue: Marine Messe Fukuoka, Fukuoka

Pos	Team	Pld	W	L	Pts	SW	SL	SR	SPW	SPL	SPR	Qualification
1	Cuba	5	5	0	10	15	1	15.000	239	135	1.770	Finals
2	China	5	3	2	8	11	8	1.375	248	196	1.265	Finals
3	Italy	5	2	3	7	8	9	0.889	202	217	0.931	5th–8th places
4	Croatia	5	2	3	7	10	12	0.833	268	293	0.915	5th–8th places
5	South Korea	5	2	3	7	7	13	0.538	213	281	0.758	
6	Bulgaria	5	1	4	6	5	13	0.385	197	245	0.804	

Date	Time		Score		Set 1	Set 2	Set 3	Set 4	Set 5	Total
7 Nov	12:30	China	3–0	Italy	15–3	15–8	15–5			45–16
7 Nov	15:00	Cuba	3–0	South Korea	15–8	15–2	15–5			45–15
7 Nov	18:00	Croatia	3–1	Bulgaria	15–9	16–14	11–15	17–15		59–53
8 Nov	12:30	China	0–3	Cuba	6–15	8–15	11–15			25–45
8 Nov	15:00	Italy	2–3	Croatia	15–10	13–15	15–8	12–15	12–15	67–63
8 Nov	18:00	South Korea	1–3	Bulgaria	5–15	15–12	6–15	12–15		38–57
9 Nov	13:00	Croatia	0–3	Cuba	11–15	14–16	6–15			31–46
9 Nov	15:30	China	3–0	Bulgaria	15–12	15–8	15–2			45–22
9 Nov	18:30	Italy	3–0	South Korea	16–14	16–14	15–8			47–36

=== Final round ===
Venue: Osaka Chuo Gymnasium, Osaka

==== 5th–8th places ====
5th–8th semifinals
11 November
Netherlands	0
Italy	3
11 November
Japan	0
Croatia	3

5th place
12 November
Croatia	0
Italy	3
7th place
12 November
Japan	1
Netherlands	3

===== 5th–8th semifinals =====
Date	Time		Score		Set 1	Set 2	Set 3	Set 4	Set 5	Total
11 Nov	10:30	Netherlands	0–3	Italy	7–15	4–15	14–16			25–46
11 Nov	18:30	Japan	0–3	Croatia	13–15	5–15	9–15			27–45

===== 7th place match =====
Date	Time		Score		Set 1	Set 2	Set 3	Set 4	Set 5	Total
12 Nov	15:30	Japan	1–3	Netherlands	12–15	15–3	10–15	8–15		45–48

===== 5th place match =====
Date	Time		Score		Set 1	Set 2	Set 3	Set 4	Set 5	Total
12 Nov	10:30	Croatia	0–3	Italy	7–15	10–15	8–15			25–45

==== Finals ====
Semifinals
11 November
Russia	0
China	3
11 November
Brazil	1
Cuba	3

Final
12 November
China	0
Cuba	3
3rd place
12 November
Brazil	1
Russia	3

===== Semifinals =====
Date	Time		Score		Set 1	Set 2	Set 3	Set 4	Set 5	Total
11 Nov	13:00	Russia	0–3	China	4–15	4–15	9–15			17–45
11 Nov	15:30	Brazil	1–3	Cuba	10–15	15–4	11–15	10–15		46–49

===== 3rd place match =====
Date	Time		Score		Set 1	Set 2	Set 3	Set 4	Set 5	Total
12 Nov	13:00	Brazil	1–3	Russia	15–13	5–15	11–15	13–15		44–58

===== Final =====
Date	Time		Score		Set 1	Set 2	Set 3	Set 4	Set 5	Total
12 Nov	18:30	China	0–3	Cuba	4–15	14–16	12–15			30–46

== Final standing ==
Rank	Team
1st place, gold medalist(s)	Cuba
2nd place, silver medalist(s)	China
3rd place, bronze medalist(s)	Russia
4	Brazil
5	Italy
6	Croatia
7	Netherlands
8	Japan
9	South Korea
9	Peru
11	Bulgaria
11	Dominican Republic
13	Germany
13	Kenya
13	Thailand
13	United States

1998 Women's World champions

Cuba
3rd title

Team roster
Yumilka Ruíz, Marlenis Costa, Mireya Luis, Lilian Izquierdo, Regla Bell, Indira Mestre, Regla Torres, Liana Mesa, Taismary Agüero, Ana Fernández, Mirka Francia, Martha Sánchez
Head coach
Antonio Perdomo

== Awards ==
- Most valuable player
  (Cuba) Regla Torres
- Best scorer
  (Croatia) Barbara Jelic
- Best spiker
  (Cuba) Ana Fernández
- Best blocker
  (Cuba) Regla Torres
- Best server
  (Netherlands) Elles Leferink
- Best digger
  (Japan) Hiroko Tsukumo
- Best setter
  (Italy) Maurizia Cacciatori
- Best receiver
  (Japan) Hiroko Tsukumo
- Best coach
  (Cuba) Antonio Perdomo
- Most Creative Coach
  (Japan) Nobuchika Kuzuwa

== Statistics leaders ==
- Only players whose teams advanced to the semifinals are ranked.

Best scorers

Rank	Name	Points
1	(Croatia) Barbara Jelić	219
2	(Russia) Yevgeniya Artamonova	189
3	(Russia) Lyubov Sokolova	175
4	(Italy) Francesca Piccinini	157
5	(Russia) Elena Godina	149
6	(Cuba) Regla Torres	132
7	(China) Qiu Aihua	124
8	(Netherlands) Elles Leferink	117
9	(Brazil) Leila Barros	116
10	(Cuba) Ana Fernández	101

Best spikers

Rank	Name	%Eff
1	(Cuba) Ana Fernández	42.18
2	(China) Qiu Aihua	39.33
3	(Cuba) Regla Torres	37.56
4	(Netherlands) Cintha Boersma	35.45
5	(Russia) Lyubov Sokolova	33.23

Best blockers

Rank	Name	Avg
1	(Cuba) Regla Torres	1.31
2	(China) Wu Yongmei	1.13
3	(Brazil) Ana Paula Connelly	1.10
4	(Cuba) Ana Fernández	0.97
5	(Italy) Simona Gioli	0.95

Best servers

Rank	Name	Avg
1	(Netherlands) Elles Leferink	0.56
2	(Russia) Lyubov Sokolova	0.46
3	(Italy) Simona Rinieri	0.43
4	(Russia) Elena Godina	0.41
5	(China) Qiu Aihua	0.38

Best diggers

Rank	Name	Avg
1	(Japan) Hiroko Tsukomo	2.18
2	(China) Li Yan	2.10
3	(Russia) Valentina Ogiyenko	1.87

Best receivers

Rank	Name	Avg
1	(Japan) Hiroko Tsukomo	70.56
2	(China) Li Yan	67.53
3	(Russia) Sandra Suruagy	65.41

Best setters

Rank	Name	Avg	%Succ
1	(Italy) Maurizia Cacciatori	12.76	52.11
2	(China) He Qi	11.19	49.67
3	(Brazil) Fernanda Venturini	10.32	57.33
4	(Netherlands) Riette Fledderus	10.12	50.23
5	(Russia) Elena Vassilevskaya	7.67	46.44
6	(Croatia) Irina Kirilova	6.33	48.34
7	(Cuba) Taismary Agüero	5.14	55.38
8	(Cuba) Marlenis Costa	5.02	53.13
9	(Japan) Minako Onuki	4.22	44.34
10	(Germany) Tanja Hart	3.89	40.23
