= Evelina Tsvetanova =

Bulgarian volleyball player (born 1974)

Personal information
- Nationality: Bulgarian
- Born: 22 April 1974 (age 52)

Volleyball information
- Position: Setter
- Number: 4 (national team)

Career
Years	Teams
2009	Anorthosis Famagosta

National team
2009	Bulgaria

Evelina Asenova Tsvetanova (Bulgarian: Евелина Асенова Цветанова) (born 22 April 1974) is a Bulgarian female former volleyball player, playing as a setter. She was part of the Bulgaria women's national volleyball team.

She competed at the 2009 Women's European Volleyball Championship. On club level she played for Anorthosis Famagosta in 2009.
