= Arkía El-Ammari =

Spanish volleyball player (born 1976)

Personal information
- Nationality: Spanish
- Born: 9 October 1976 (age 50)

Volleyball information
- Position: Opposite
- Number: 17 (national team)

Career
Years	Teams
2009	Club Voleibol Tenerife

National team
2009	Spain

Arkía El-Ammari (born 9 October 1976) is a Spanish former volleyball player who played as an opposite. She was part of the Spain women's national team.

She competed at the 2009 Women's European Volleyball Championship. On club level she played for Club Voleibol Tenerife in 2009.
