= Elles Leferink =

Dutch volleyball player (born 1976)

Personal information
- Born: 14 November 1976 (age 49) Weerselo, Overijssel, Netherlands
Medal record
Women's volleyball
Representing the Netherlands
European Championships
Gold medal – first place	1995 Arnhem	Team competition

Elles Maria Leferink (born 14 November 1976 in Weerselo, Overijssel) is a volleyball player from the Netherlands, who represented her native country at the 1996 Summer Olympics in Atlanta, Georgia, finishing in fifth place.

Leferink was a leading youngster in the Netherlands national team that won the gold medal at the 1995 European Championship by defeating Croatia 3–0 in the final.

Among other awards she was elected "best player of Europe" aged 19 in 1995 and "best server" at the World Championship 1998 and the European Championship in 2003.

She retired in 2007, becoming a mother.

== Individual awards ==
- 1995 CEV "European Volleyball Player of the Year"
- 1998 World Championship "Best Server"
- 2003 European Championship "Best Server"
