= Elisa Togut =

Italian volleyball player (born 1978)

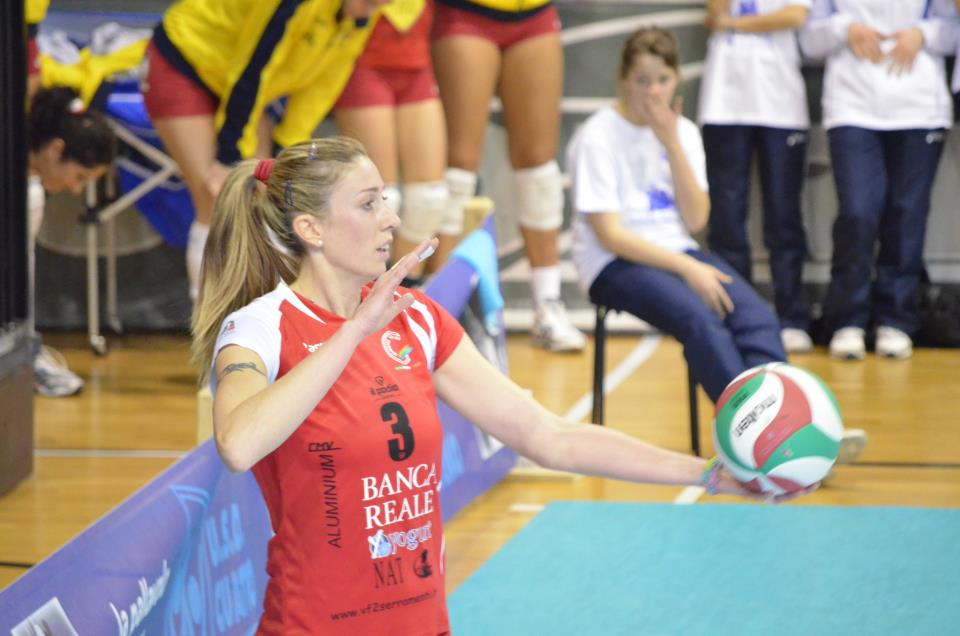

Medal record

Women's volleyball

Representing Italy

World Championship
Gold medal – first place	2002 Germany	Team

European Championship
Silver medal – second place	2001 Varna	Team
Silver medal – second place	2005 Zagreb	Team

FIVB World Grand Prix
Silver medal – second place	2004 Reggio Calabria	Team

Elisa Togut (born 14 May 1978 in Gorizia) is an Italian former volleyball player who represented Italy at the 2000 Summer Olympics in Sydney, Australia. There she ended up in ninth place with the Women's National Team. Two years later, at the World Championship in Germany, she claimed the gold medal and was named Most Valuable Player of the tournament.

== Honours ==
- 1998 World Championship — 5th place
- 1998 FIVB World Grand Prix — 5th place
- 1999 FIVB World Cup — 7th place
- 1999 FIVB World Grand Prix — 4th place
- 2000 Olympic Games — 9th place
- 2000 FIVB World Grand Prix — 7th place
- 2001 European Championship — 2nd place
- 2002 World Championship — 1st place
- 2003 FIVB World Grand Prix — 5th place
- 2004 Olympic Games — 5th place (tied)
- 2005 European Championship — 2nd place

== Individual awards ==
- 2002 World Championship "Most Valuable Player"
