= Olga Kolomiyets =

Ukrainian volleyball player (born 1973)

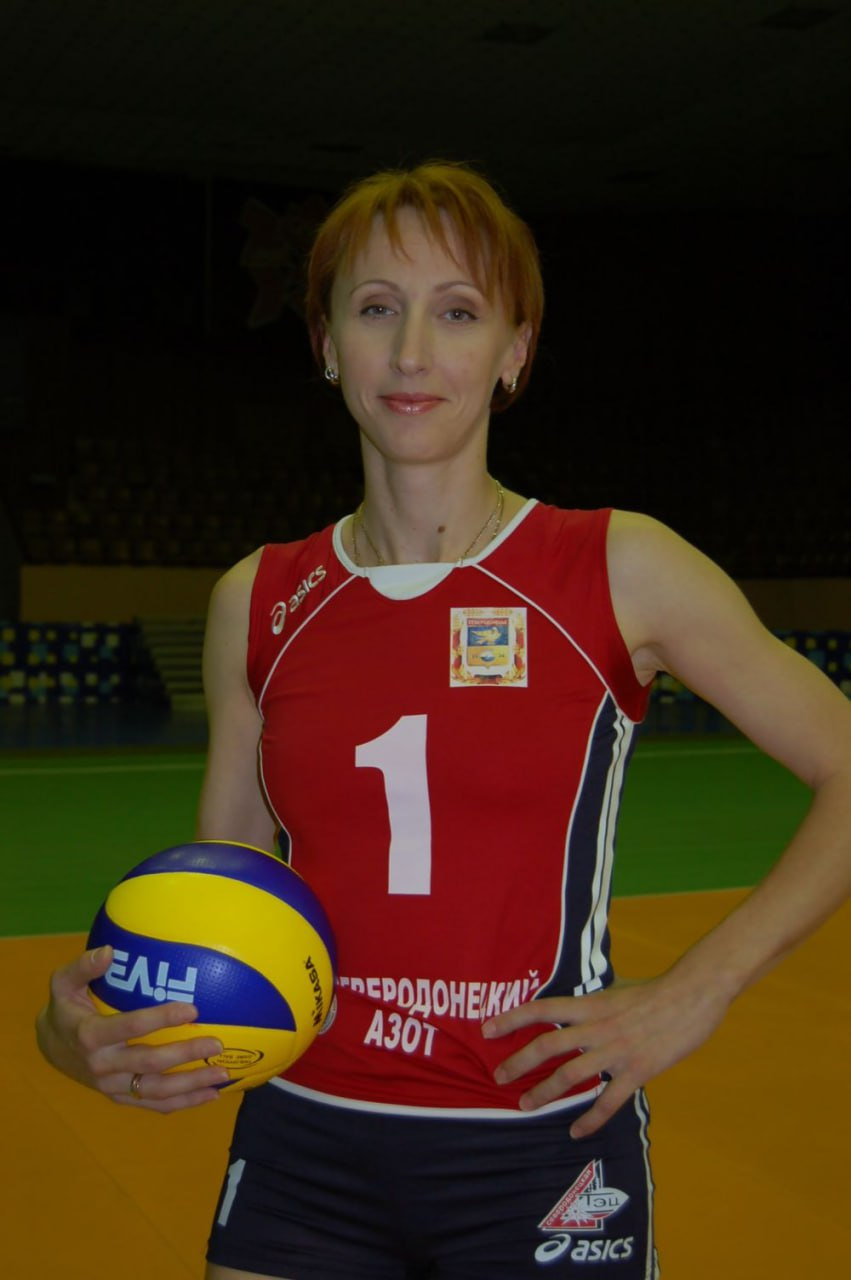

Personal information
- Nationality: Ukrainian
- Born: 25 September 1973 (age 53); Zaporizhia, Ukrainian SSR, Soviet Union
- Height: 180 cm (5 ft 11 in)

Career
Years	Teams
1994	Olexandria Bila

National team
1994-1996	Ukraine
Honours
Women's volleyball
Representing Ukraine
European Championship
Bronze medal – third place	1993 Brno-Zlin	Team
World U20 Championship
Silver medal – second place	1993 Brazil	Team

Olga Kolomiyets (born 25 September 1973) was a Ukrainian female volleyball player.

She was part of the Ukraine women's national volleyball team at the 1996 Summer Olympics, and the 1994 FIVB Women's World Championship. On club level she played with Olexandria Bila.
