= Jerine Fleurke =

Dutch volleyball player (born 1973)

Personal information
- Born: 11 August 1973 (age 52) Groningen, Netherlands
Medal record
Women's volleyball
Representing the Netherlands
European Championships
Gold medal – first place	1995 Netherlands	Team competition

Jenny ("Jerine") Catharine Fleurke (born 11 August 1973, in Groningen) is a retired female volleyball player from the Netherlands, who represented her native country at the 1996 Summer Olympics in Atlanta, Georgia, finishing in fifth place.

Fleurke was a member of the Netherlands national team that won the gold medal at the 1995 European Championship by defeating Croatia 3–0 in the final.
