= Maurizia Cacciatori =

Italian volleyball player and sport commentator

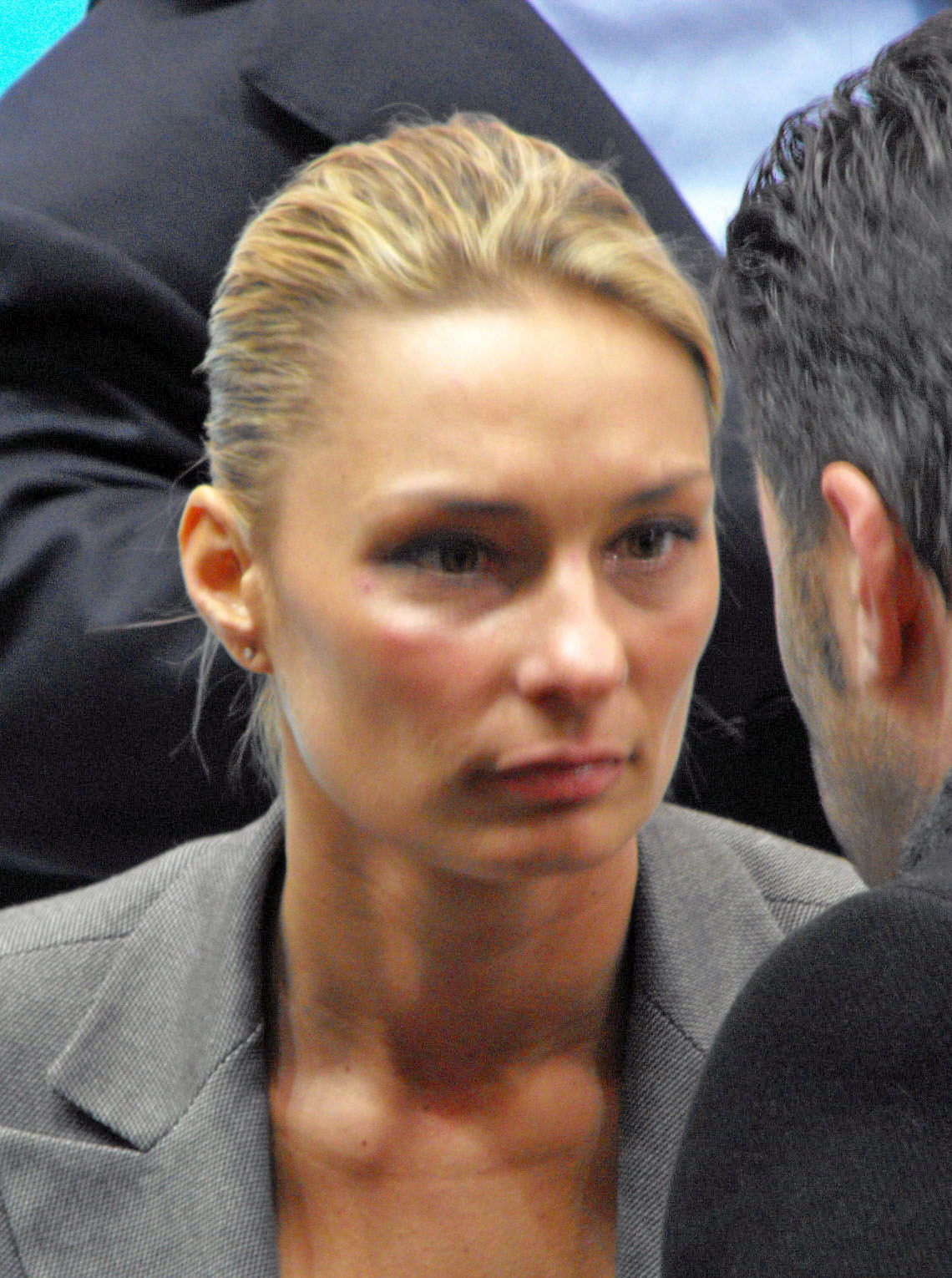

Personal information
- Born: 6 April 1973 (age 53); Carrara, Italy
- Height: 178 cm (5 ft 10 in)

Volleyball information
- Position: Setter
- Number: 7

National team
1998-2004	Italy
Honours
Silver medal – second place	2001 European Championship	Team
Bronze medal – third place	1999 European Championship	Team
Gold medal – first place	2001 Mediterranean Games	Team

Maurizia Cacciatori (born 6 April 1973) is an Italian former volleyball player and sports commentator.

Born in Carrara, Cacciatori has racked up 228 appearances in the Italian national team, winning a gold medal at the 2001 Mediterranean Games and being awarded best setter at the 1998 FIVB Volleyball Women's World Championship.

== Personal life ==
In 2006, Cacciatori was a contestant on the reality show L'Isola dei Famosi (Italian version of Celebrity Survivor). Since 2007, she has been a sports commentator for Sky Sport.

== Teams ==
- 1986-89 - Pallavolo Carrarese (Serie B, Serie A2).
- 1989-93 - Sirio Perugia (Serie A1).
- 1993-95 - Amazzoni Agrigento (Serie A1).
- 1995-98 - Volley Bergamo (Serie A1).
- 1998-99 - Ester Naples (Serie A1).
- 1999-03 - Volley Bergamo (Serie A1).
- 2003-05 - Marichal Tenerife (Superliga Femenina de Voleibol).
- 2005-06 - Start Arzano (Serie A1).
- 2006-07 - Ícaro Alaró (Superliga 2).

== Palmarès ==
- 5 National Leagues
  - Bergamo: 95-96, 96-97, 97-98, 01-02
  - Tenerife: 03-04
- 5 National Cups
  - Perugia: 91-92
  - Bergamo: 95-96, 96-97, 97-98
  - Tenerife 03-04
- 3 SuperCups
  - Bergamo: 1996, 1997
- 3 Champions Leagues
  - Bergamo: 1997, 2000
  - Tenerife: 2004
- 1 CEV Cup
  - Naples: 1999
