= Alla Kravets =

Ukrainian volleyball player (born 1973)

Personal information
- Nationality: Ukrainian
- Born: 12 January 1973 (age 53); Zaporizhia, Ukrainian SSR, Soviet Union
- Height: 183 cm (6 ft 0 in)

Career
Years	Teams
1994	Olexandria Bila

National team
1994-2001	Ukraine
Honours
Women's volleyball
Representing Ukraine
European Championship
Bronze medal – third place	1993 Brno-Zlin	Team
World U20 Championship
Silver medal – second place	1993 Brazil	Team

Alla Kravets (Алла Кравець; born 12 January 1973) is a Ukrainian volleyball player.

She was part of the Ukraine women's national volleyball team at the 1996 Summer Olympics. She also competed at the 1994 FIVB Volleyball Women's World Championship and 2001 Women's European Volleyball Championship. On club level she played with Olexandria Bila.

== Clubs ==
- Olexandria Bila (1994)
