= Olena Sydorenko =

Ukrainian volleyball player (born 1974)

Personal information
- Nationality: Ukrainian
- Born: 20 January 1974 (age 52)

National team
1996-2001	Ukraine

Olena Sydorenko (born 20 January 1974) is a former Ukrainian volleyball player. She was part of the Ukraine women's national volleyball team.

She participated at the 1996 Summer Olympics. She also competed at the 2001 Women's European Volleyball Championship.
