= Alexandra Fomina =

Ukrainian volleyball player (born 1975)

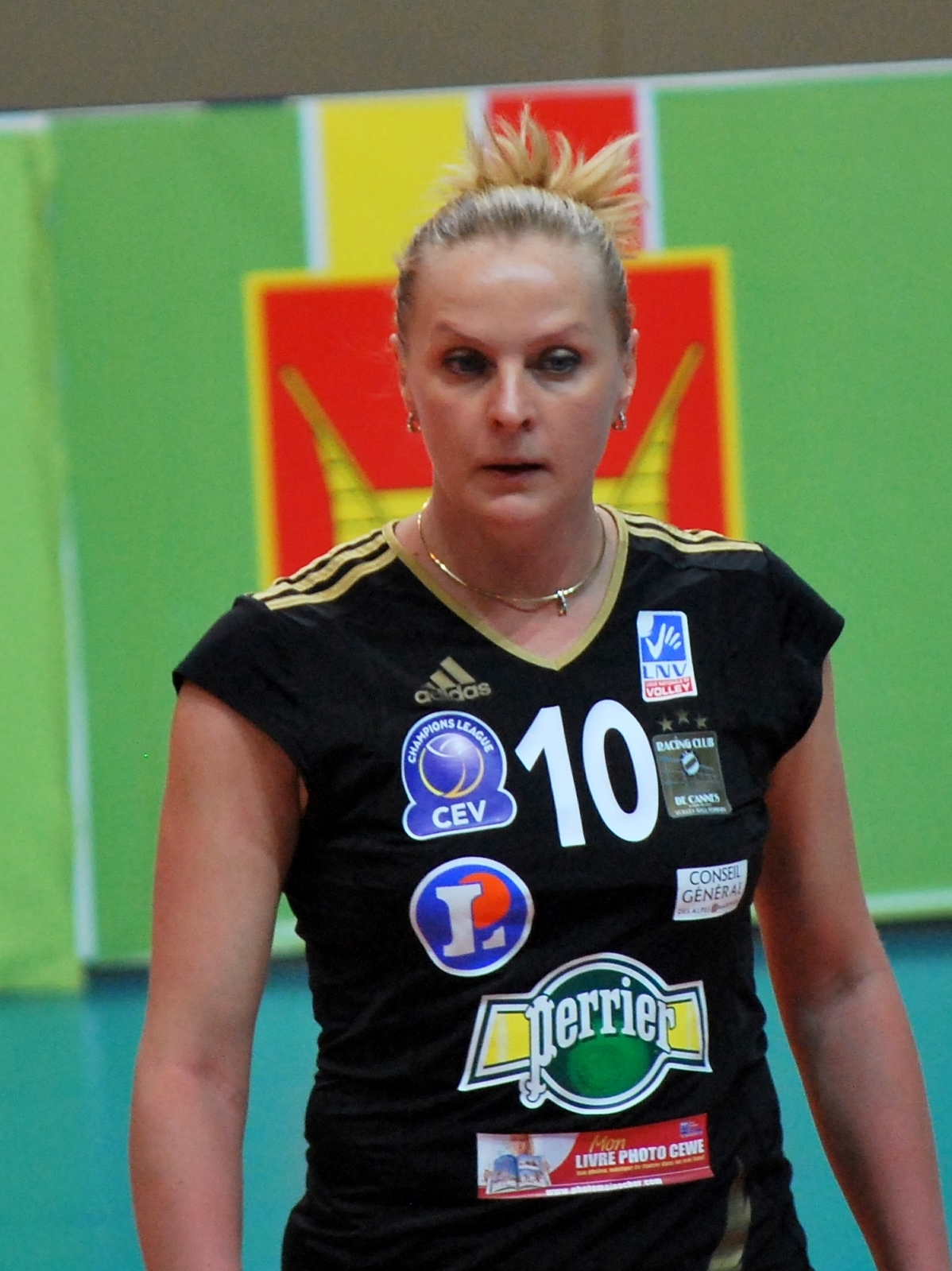
- Fomina in 2011

Personal information
- Nationality: Ukrainian
- Born: 4 May 1975 (age 51)
- Height: 180 cm (5 ft 11 in)
- Weight: 73 kg (161 lb)
- Spike: 300 cm (118 in)
- Block: 285 cm (112 in)

Career
Years	Teams
2012	Rabita Baku

National team
Ukraine

Alexandra Fomina (also spelled Olexandra or Oleksandra, Ukrainian: Олександра Фоміна, born 4 May 1975) is a Ukrainian volleyball player. With her club Rabita Baku, she competed at the 2012 FIVB Volleyball Women's Club World Championship. She was a part of the team that competed for Ukraine at the 1996 Summer Olympics.
