= Nataliya Bozhenova =

Ukrainian volleyball player (born 1969)

Personal information
- Nationality: Ukrainian
- Born: 15 January 1969 (age 57)

Volleyball information
- Position: Middle-blocker

Career
Years	Teams
2001	Teodora Ravenna

National team
1996-2001	Ukraine

Nataliya Bozhenova (born 15 January 1969) is a former Ukrainian volleyball player, who played as a middle-blocker.

She was part of the Ukraine women's national volleyball team at the 1996 Summer Olympics. She also competed at the 2001 Women's European Volleyball Championship. On club level she played for Teodora Ravenna in 2001.
