= Mariya Polyakova =

Ukrainian volleyball player (born 1974)

Personal information
- Nationality: Ukrainian
- Born: 7 April 1974 (age 52)
- Height: 188 cm (6 ft 2 in)

Career
Years
1994-1996
Teams
Olexandria Bila
Uniban/São Caetano - Brazil (1997/98)
Uniban/São Bernardo - Brazil (1998/99)

National team
| 1994 | Ukraine |
Honours
Women's volleyball
Representing Ukraine
European Championship
| Bronze medal – third place | 1993 Brno-Zlin | Team |
World U20 Championship
| Silver medal – second place | 1993 Brazil | Team |
Representing Soviet Union
World U18 Championship
| Bronze medal – third place | 1991 Lisbon | Team |

{{not to be confused with Soviet GRU rezident Maria Josefovna Poliakova}}

Mariya Polyakova (born 7 April 1974) is a Ukrainian former volleyball player.

She was part of the Ukraine women's national volleyball team at the 1996 Summer Olympics, and the 1994 FIVB Volleyball Women's World Championship. On club level she played with Olexandria Bila.

== Clubs ==
- Olexandria Bila (1994)
