= Vesna Jelić =

Croatian volleyball player (born 1982)

Vesna Jelic
Personal information
- Full name: Vesna Jelić
- Nationality: Croatian
- Born: 22 March 1982 (age 44) Novo Mesto
- Height: 1.83 m (6 ft 0 in)
- Weight: 70 kg (154 lb)

Volleyball information

National team
- Years: Team
- 2000-2006: Croatia

Vesna Jelić (born 22 March 1982 in Novo Mesto), is a former Croatian female volleyball player. She was part of the Croatia women's national volleyball team.

== Career ==
She competed with the national team at the 2000 Summer Olympics in Sydney, Australia, finishing 7th.

== Family ==
Vesna is the sister of volleyball player Barbara Jelić who was also part of the Croatian team at the 2000 Summer Olympics. They are the daughters of volleyball player Ivica Jelić who was the head coach of the Croatian team in 2000 and played for the Yugoslav team at the 1980 Summer Olympics.

== See also ==
- Croatia at the 2000 Summer Olympics
