= Elena Krivonosova =

Ukrainian volleyball player (born 1972)

Personal information
- Nationality: Ukrainian
- Born: 24 June 1972 (age 54)
- Height: 190 cm (6 ft 3 in)

Volleyball information
- Number: 12 (national team)

Career
Years	Teams
1994-1996	Dynamo Janestra

National team
1994	Ukraine

Elena Krivonosova (born 24 June 1972), also known as Olena Kryvonosova, is a Ukrainian retired volleyball player.

She was part of the Ukraine women's national volleyball team at the 1996 Summer Olympics in Atlanta. On club level she played with Dynamo Janestra.

== Clubs ==
- Dynamo Janestra (1994)
