= Emiliya Serafimova =

Bulgarian volleyball player (born 1976)

Personal information
- Nationality: Bulgarian
- Born: 24 September 1976 (age 50)

Volleyball information
- Number: 15 (national team)

National team
2001	Bulgaria

Emiliya Serafimova (Bulgarian: Емилия Серафимова) (born 24 September 1976) is a Bulgarian female former volleyball player.

She was part of the Bulgaria women's national volleyball team. She competed at the 2001 Women's European Volleyball Championship.
