= Yuliya Shelukhina =

Polish volleyball player (born 1979)

Julia Szeluchina
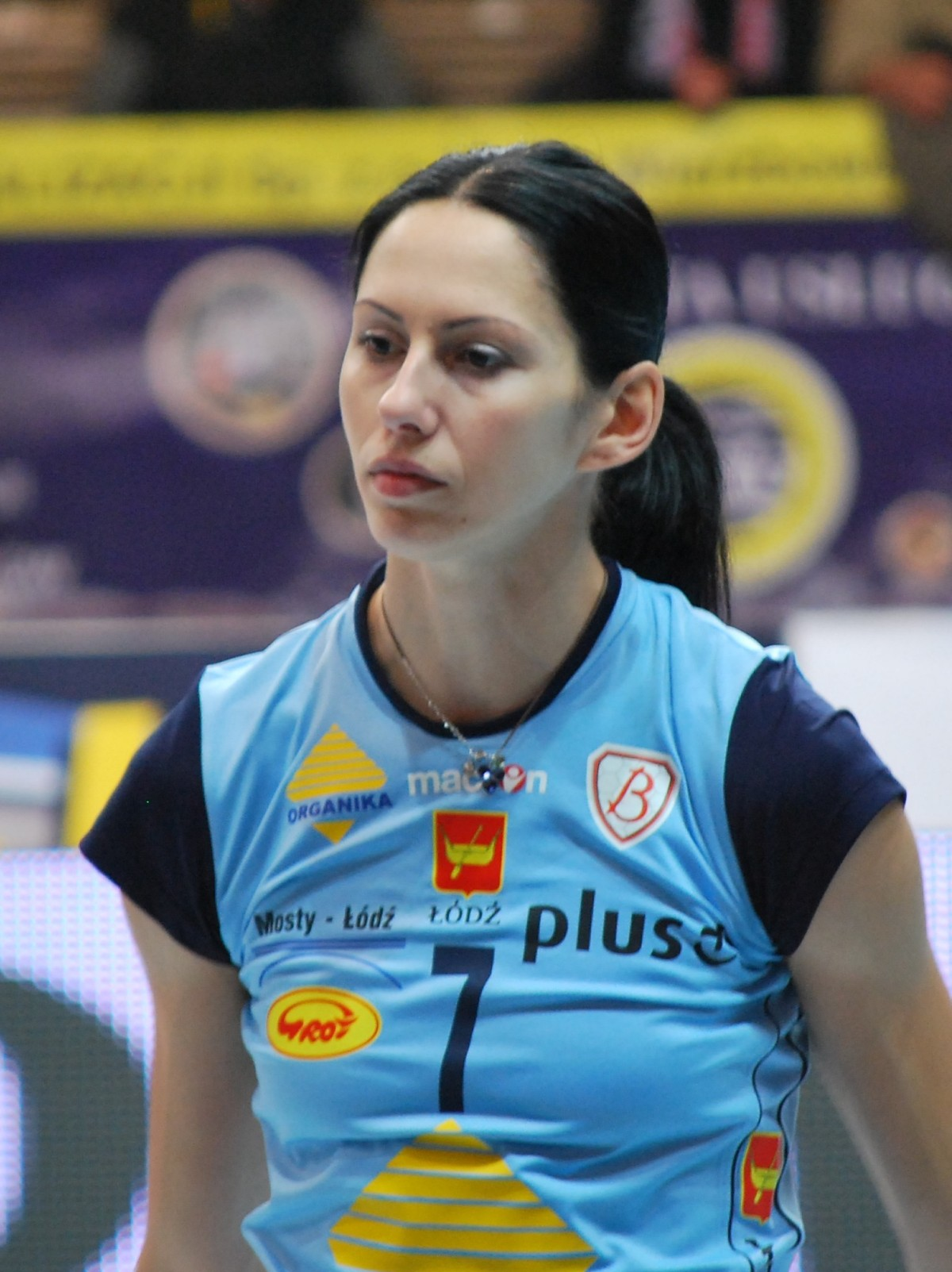
- Julia Szeluchina in 2011

Personal information
- Nationality: Ukrainian
- Born: April 30, 1979 (age 47)
- Height: 180 cm (5 ft 11 in)

Volleyball information
- Number: 7

Yuliya Shelukhina competed at the 2005 FIVB Volleyball Girls' U18 World Championship, 2013 Women's European Volleyball Championship, and 2014 FIVB Volleyball Women's World Championship.

Szeluchina played for Monte Schiavo Banca Marche Jesi, Grot Budowlani Łódź, and Atom Trefl Sopot.
