= Anna Milanova =

Bulgarian volleyball player (born 1978)

Personal information
- Nationality: Bulgarian
- Born: 6 February 1978 (age 48)

Volleyball information
- Number: 17 (national team)

National team
2001	Bulgaria

Anna Milanova (Bulgarian: Ана Миланова; born 6 February 1978) is a Bulgarian female former volleyball player. She was part of the Bulgaria women's national volleyball team.

She competed at the 2001 Women's European Volleyball Championship.
