= Rehina Myloserdova =

Ukrainian volleyball player (born 1973)

Rehina Miloserdova

Personal information
- Nationality: Ukrainian
- Born: 9 June 1973 (age 53)

National team
Ukraine

Rehina Myloserdova (born 9 June 1973) is a Ukrainian volleyball player.

She was part of the Ukraine women's national volleyball team at the 1996 Summer Olympics.
