= Barbara Jelić-Ružić =

Croatian volleyball player

Barbara Jelić

Personal information
- Full name: Barbara Jelić-Ružić
- Born: 8 May 1977 (age 49); Novo Mesto, SR Slovenia, SFR Yugoslavia
- Height: 1.93 m (6 ft 4 in)
- Weight: 75 kg (165 lb)
- Spike: 320 cm (130 in)

Volleyball information
- Position: outside hitter
Honours
Women's volleyball
Representing Croatia
European Championship
Silver medal – second place	1995 Netherlands	Team
Silver medal – second place	1997 Czech Republic	Team
Silver medal – second place	1999 Italy	Team

Barbara Jelić-Ružić (born 8 May 1977) is a former international volleyball player for Croatia.

Barbara is the sister of volleyball player Vesna Jelić who was also part of the Croatian team at the 2000 Summer Olympics. They are the daughters of volleyball player Ivica Jelić who was the head coach of the Croatian team in 2000 and played for the Yugoslav team at the 1980 Summer Olympics.

== Early life and career ==
Jelić was born in Novo Mesto, Slovenia, Yugoslavia to Croatian father Ivica and Slovenian mother Margareta, both former players. At 17 she went to Japan to play as a professional for five years, where she was frequently honored best player in different categories.

As an outstanding outside and opposite hitter she led the Croatian team with her father Ivica Jelić as coach to three silver medals at the European Championships 1995, 1997 and 1999, a sensational 7th place at the Olympics in Sydney 2000 and a 6th place at the World Championship 1998 in Japan. Thereby she often scored more points than the rest of her teammates all together. Accordingly, she was elected best scorer at the WC 1998, the World Cup 1999, the Olympic Qualification 2000 and more. In 2000, she was honored best player of Europe. She was considered the best scorer at the Sydney Games.

After her time in Japan she played in the Italian and Turkish league gaining further titles - with an interruption in the 2000–01 season to become a mother - and called it a career in 2004. She briefly returned to support Croatia at the European Championship in her home country in 2005, persuaded by her coach-father to be a role model for young Croatian girls. After a good 3rd place in preliminaries with outstanding Ružić, Croatia finished ranked 8th with Ružić being slightly injured in the final round.

== Personal life ==
In 2001, she married Tomislav Ružić, a Croatian basketball player. As of 2015, Jelić-Ružić lives in Zadar with her husband and two children named Zara and Michael.
