= Tetyana Ivanyushkyna =

Ukrainian volleyball player (born 1966)

Personal information
- Born: 18 September 1966 (age 60)
- Height: 196 cm (6 ft 5 in)

Career
Years	Teams
1994	Iskra Lugansk

National team
1994-1996	Ukraine

Tetyana Ivanyushkyna (Note: Also romanized as Tetiana Ivaniushkina.) (Ukrainian: Тетяна Іванюшкіна; born 18 September 1966) is a former Ukrainian volleyball player.

She was part of the Ukraine women's national volleyball team at the 1996 Summer Olympics. On club level she played with Iskra Lugansk.

== Clubs ==
- Iskra Lugansk (1994)
- Uniban/São Caetano - Brazil (1997/98)
- Uniban/São Bernardo - Brazil (1998/99)
