= Riëtte Fledderus =

Dutch volleyball player (born 1977)

Personal information
- Full name: Emmy Henriëtte Fledderus
- Nickname: Riëtte Fledderus
- Nationality: Dutch
- Born: 18 October 1977 (age 48) Meppel, Netherlands
Medal record
Women's volleyball
Representing the Netherlands
European Championships
Gold medal – first place	1995 Netherlands	Team competition
World Grand Prix
Gold medal – first place	2007 Ningbo	Team competition

Emmy Henriëtte "Riëtte" Fledderus (born 18 October 1977) is a retired volleyball player from the Netherlands, who represented her native country at the 1996 Summer Olympics in Atlanta, Georgia, finishing in fifth place.

Fledderus was a member of the Netherlands national team that won the gold medal at the 1995 European Championship by defeating Croatia 3–0 in the final. She was also part of the team during the 2007 Boris Yeltsin Cup in Yekaterinburg where the Dutch won the silver medal after losing the final to China 3–1.
