= Romania women's national volleyball team =

Women's national volleyball team representing Romania

Romania
- Association: Federaţia Română de Volei
- Confederation: CEV
- Head coach: Guillermo Naranjo Hernandez
- FIVB ranking: 24 (24 May 2026)

Uniforms
Home
- frvolei.eu
Honours
Medal record
World Championship
Silver medal – second place	1956 France
European Championship
Bronze medal – third place	1963 Romania
European League
Bronze medal – third place	2022 Orléans
Bronze medal – third place	2025 Ängelholm

The Romania women's national volleyball team is governed by the Federaţia Română de Volei and takes part in international volleyball competitions.

== Results ==
=== European Championship ===
- 1949 — 4th place
- 1950 — 5th place
- 1951 — did not qualify
- 1955 — 4th place
- 1958 — 4th place
- 1963 — Bronze Medal
- 1967 — 9th place
- 1971 — 7th place
- 1975 — 7th place
- 1977 — 6th place
- 1977 — 5th place
- 1981 — 7th place
- 1983 — 6th place
- 1985 — 11th place
- 1987 — 8th place
- 1989 — 4th place
- 1991 — 6th place
- 1993 — 10th place
- 1995 — did not qualify
- 1997 — 12th place
- 1999 — 6th place
- 2001 — 7th place
- 2003 — 8th place
- 2005 — 10th place
- 2007 — did not qualify
- 2009 — did not qualify
- 2011 — 12th place
- 2013 — did not qualify
- 2015 — 15th place
- 2017 — did not qualify
- 2019 — 13th place
- 2021 — 23rd place
- 2023 — 11th place
- 2026 — 17th place

== Past squad ==
2023 Women's European Volleyball Championship

The following is the Romanian roster in the 2023 European Championship.

- Head coach: (Spain) Guillermo Naranjo Hernandez
- 1 Diana Ariton MB
- 2 Diana-Teodora Vereș L
- 3 Rodica Buterez OS
- 5 Raisa-Laura Ioan MB
- 6 Mihaela Albu L
- 7 Elizabet Lenke MB
- 8 Ana-Marisa Radu S
- 9 Iarina-Luana Axinte S
- 11 Maria Matei OS
- 14 Roxana Roman MB
- 15 Sorina Miclaus OS
- 18 Dalia Vîrlan MB
- 19 Adelina Budai-Ungureanu OP
- 21 Iuna Zadorojnai OP

== Notable players ==
- Carmen Țurlea
- Cristina Pîrv
- Alida Cioroianu-Marcovici
- Mirela Corjeuţanu
- Anca Popescu
- Luminița Pintea-Trombițaș
- Elena Butnaru
- Nicoleta Țolișteanu-Manu
- Florentina Nedelcu
- Iuliana Roxana Nucu
- Adina Salaoru
- Nneka Onyejekwe
- Ioana Baciu
- Alina Albu
- Ioana Nemțanu
- Roxana Bacșiș
- Diana Calotă
- Andreea Constantinescu
- Alexia Căruțașu
- Rodica Buterez
- Adelina Ungureanu
- Elizabet Inneh

== See also ==
- Romania men's national volleyball team
