= 2002 FIVB Women's Volleyball World Championship =

Volleyball world championship

2002 FIVB Women's World Championship
Weltmeisterschaft der Frauen Deutschland 2002

Tournament details
- Host country: Germany
- Dates: 30 August – 15 September
- Teams: 24
- Venues: 8 (in 8 host cities)
- Officially opened by: Johannes Rau

Final positions
- Champions: Italy (1st title)
- Runners-up: United States
- Third place: Russia
- Fourth place: China

Tournament awards
- MVP: (Italy) Elisa Togut
- Best Setter: (Brazil) Marcelle Rodrigues
- Best OH: (Russia) Elizaveta Tichtchenko
- Best MB: (United States) Danielle Scott
- Best Scorer: (Cuba) Yumilka Ruíz
- Best Server: (Cuba) Nancy Carrillo
- Best Digger: (South Korea) Koo Ki-lan
- Best Receiver: (South Korea) Koo Ki-lan

The 2002 FIVB Women's World Championship was the fourteenth edition of the tournament, organised by the world's governing body, the FIVB. It was held from 30 August to 15 September 2002 in Berlin, Bremen, Dresden, Münster, Schwerin, Riesa, Leipzig, and Stuttgart, Germany. The tournament saw the discontinuation of Cuba's historic eight consecutive world titles, as the team finished fifth after being eliminated by the United States in the quarterfinals.

== Qualification ==
| Team | Confederation | Qualified as | Qualified on | Appearance in finals |
|---|---|---|---|---|
| Germany | CEV | Host | | 11th^{1} |
| Cuba | NORCECA | 1998 World Championship Winner | 12 November 1998 | 9th |
| Netherlands | CEV | CEV Pool E Winner | 19 June 2001 | 10th |
| Czech Republic | CEV | CEV Pool G Winner | 24 June 2001 | 10th^{2} |
| Russia | CEV | CEV Pool H Winner | 24 June 2001 | 13th^{3} |
| Poland | CEV | CEV Pool F Winner | 26 June 2001 | 8th |
| Japan | AVC | AVC Pool C Winner | 8 July 2001 | 12th |
| Thailand | AVC | AVC Pool C Runner-up | 8 July 2001 | 2nd |
| Brazil | CSV | CSV Pool M Winner | 8 July 2001 | 12th |
| Argentina | CSV | CSV Pool M Runner-up | 8 July 2001 | 4th |
| Dominican Republic | NORCECA | NORCECA Pool K Winner | 14 July 2001 | 4th |
| Canada | NORCECA | NORCECA Pool K Runner-up | 14 July 2001 | 6th |
| Kenya | CAVB | CSV Pool A Winner | 15 July 2001 | 3rd |
| Italy | CEV | CEV Pool I Winner | 15 July 2001 | 7th |
| United States | NORCECA | NORCECA Pool L Winner | 15 July 2001 | 12th |
| Puerto Rico | NORCECA | NORCECA Pool L Runner-up | 15 July 2001 | 3rd |
| Egypt | CAVB | CSV Pool B Winner | 5 August 2001 | 2nd |
| Greece | CEV | CEV Pool J Winner | 29 August 2001 | 1st |
| Bulgaria | CEV | CEV Pools E-J Best runner-up | 29 August 2001 | 10th |
| Romania | CEV | CEV Pools E-J Second best runner-up | 29 August 2001 | 7th |
| China | AVC | AVC Pool D Winner | 2 September 2001 | 10th |
| South Korea | AVC | AVC Pool D Runner-up | 2 September 2001 | 9th |
| Australia | AVC | AVC Pool D Third | 2 September 2001 | 2nd |
| Mexico | NORCECA | CSV / NORCECA Playoff Winner | 9 September 2001 | 5th |

1.Competed as West Germany from 1956 to 1990; 3rd appearance as Germany.
2.Competed as Czechoslovakia from 1952 to 1986; 2nd appearance as Czech Republic.
3.Competed as Soviet Union from 1952 to 1990; 3rd appearance as Russia.

Source: FIVB

== Venues ==
| Pool E, Final round | Pool B | Final round | Host cities in Germany |
| Bremen | Schwerin | Berlin | Host cities in Germany |
| Stadthalle Bremen | Sport/Congresshalle | Max-Schmeling-Halle | Host cities in Germany |
| Capacity: 3,500 | Capacity: 5,200 | Capacity: 10,000 | Host cities in Germany |
| Pool D | Pool C, G | Pool C | Host cities in Germany |
| Leipzig | Riesa | Dresden | Host cities in Germany |
| Mehrzwecksporthalle | Sachsen Arena | Mehrzweckhalle | Host cities in Germany |
| Capacity: 7,000 | Capacity: 5,500 | Capacity: 3,000 | Host cities in Germany |
| Pool A | Pool F, Final round | | Host cities in Germany |
| Münster | Stuttgart | | Host cities in Germany |
| Halle Münsterland | Hanns-Martin-Schleyer-Halle | | Host cities in Germany |
| Capacity: 7,000 | Capacity: 15,000 | | Host cities in Germany |

== Format ==
The tournament was played in three different stages (first, second and final rounds). In the First round, the 24 participants were divided in four groups of six teams each. A single round-robin format was played within each group to determine the teams group position, the three best teams of each group (total of 12 teams) progressed to the next round.

In the Second round, the 12 teams were divided in three groups of four teams. A single round-robin format was played within each group to determine the teams group position, the two best teams of each group and the two best third places (total of 8 teams) progressed to the next round.

The Final round was played in a single elimination format, with placement matches determining the top eight positions. Starting at the quarterfinals, winners advanced to the semifinals while losers advanced to the placement matches (5th-8th semifinal). Winners and losers of each semifinals played a final placement match for 1st to 8th places.

For the tournament's final standings, teams which did not reach placement matches were allocated as:

- All four teams finishing 6th in each First round pool were ranked 21st.
- All four teams finishing 5th in each First round pool were ranked 17th.
- All four teams finishing 4th in each First round pool were ranked 13th.
- All three teams finishing 4th in each Second round pool were ranked 10th.
- The team finishing 3rd in the Second round pool which did not progress to the Final round was ranked 9th.

Source: FIVB

== Pools composition ==
Teams were seeded in the first three positions of each pool following the Serpentine system according to their FIVB World Ranking. FIVB reserved the right to seed the hosts as head of Pool A regardless of the World Ranking. All teams not seeded were drawn to take other available positions in the remaining lines.

| Pool A | Pool B | Pool C | Pool D |
|---|---|---|---|
| Germany | Cuba | Russia | Brazil |
| Italy | South Korea | United States | China |
| Japan | Netherlands | Argentina | Australia |
| Bulgaria | Canada | Dominican Republic | Thailand |
| Czech Republic | Romania | Kenya | Poland |
| Mexico | Egypt | Puerto Rico | Greece |

== Results ==
All times are Central European Summer Time (UTC+02:00).

=== First round ===
==== Pool A ====
Venue: Halle Münsterland, Münster

| Pos | Team | Pld | W | L | Pts | SW | SL | SR | SPW | SPL | SPR | Qualification |
|---|---|---|---|---|---|---|---|---|---|---|---|---|
| 1 | Italy | 5 | 5 | 0 | 10 | 15 | 0 | MAX | 382 | 288 | 1.326 | Second round |
| 2 | Bulgaria | 5 | 3 | 2 | 8 | 10 | 6 | 1.667 | 368 | 339 | 1.086 | Second round |
| 3 | Germany | 5 | 3 | 2 | 8 | 9 | 9 | 1.000 | 429 | 403 | 1.065 | Second round |
| 4 | Japan | 5 | 2 | 3 | 7 | 8 | 10 | 0.800 | 402 | 401 | 1.002 | |
| 5 | Czech Republic | 5 | 2 | 3 | 7 | 8 | 12 | 0.667 | 435 | 464 | 0.938 | |
| 6 | Mexico | 5 | 0 | 5 | 5 | 2 | 15 | 0.133 | 294 | 415 | 0.708 | |

| Date | Time | | Score | | Set 1 | Set 2 | Set 3 | Set 4 | Set 5 | Total | Report |
|---|---|---|---|---|---|---|---|---|---|---|---|
| 30 Aug | 12:00 | Italy | 3–0 | Japan | 25–11 | 26–24 | 25–21 | | | 76–56 | Report |
| 30 Aug | 16:30 | Czech Republic | 2–3 | Germany | 20–25 | 30–28 | 22–25 | 27–25 | 13–15 | 112–118 | Report |
| 30 Aug | 19:00 | Mexico | 0–3 | Bulgaria | 22–25 | 16–25 | 17–25 | | | 55–75 | Report |
| 31 Aug | 15:00 | Japan | 1–3 | Germany | 21–25 | 19–25 | 27–25 | 21–25 | | 88–100 | Report |
| 31 Aug | 17:30 | Italy | 3–0 | Mexico | 25–17 | 25–13 | 25–19 | | | 75–49 | Report |
| 31 Aug | 19:30 | Bulgaria | 3–0 | Czech Republic | 25–19 | 25–23 | 25–9 | | | 75–51 | Report |
| 1 Sep | 13:00 | Mexico | 0–3 | Japan | 13–25 | 16–25 | 11–25 | | | 40–75 | Report |
| 1 Sep | 16:00 | Germany | 0–3 | Bulgaria | 24–26 | 23–25 | 20–25 | | | 67–76 | Report |
| 1 Sep | 18:30 | Czech Republic | 0–3 | Italy | 18–25 | 21–25 | 22–25 | | | 61–75 | Report |
| 2 Sep | 13:00 | Japan | 3–1 | Bulgaria | 16–25 | 25–22 | 25–20 | 25–22 | | 91–89 | Report |
| 2 Sep | 18:00 | Mexico | 2–3 | Czech Republic | 25–23 | 25–23 | 19–25 | 18–25 | 17–19 | 104–115 | Report |
| 2 Sep | 20:30 | Italy | 3–0 | Germany | 25–18 | 31–29 | 25–22 | | | 81–69 | Report |
| 3 Sep | 13:00 | Czech Republic | 3–1 | Japan | 25–23 | 21–25 | 25–21 | 25–23 | | 96–92 | Report |
| 3 Sep | 18:00 | Bulgaria | 0–3 | Italy | 18–25 | 16–25 | 19–25 | | | 53–75 | Report |
| 3 Sep | 20:30 | Germany | 3–0 | Mexico | 25–13 | 25–14 | 25–19 | | | 75–46 | Report |

==== Pool B ====
Venue: Sport/Congresshalle, Schwerin

| Pos | Team | Pld | W | L | Pts | SW | SL | SR | SPW | SPL | SPR | Qualification |
|---|---|---|---|---|---|---|---|---|---|---|---|---|
| 1 | South Korea | 5 | 5 | 0 | 10 | 15 | 3 | 5.000 | 425 | 334 | 1.272 | Second round |
| 2 | Cuba | 5 | 4 | 1 | 9 | 14 | 5 | 2.800 | 436 | 356 | 1.225 | Second round |
| 3 | Netherlands | 5 | 3 | 2 | 8 | 9 | 7 | 1.286 | 373 | 336 | 1.110 | Second round |
| 4 | Romania | 5 | 2 | 3 | 7 | 8 | 9 | 0.889 | 383 | 376 | 1.019 | |
| 5 | Canada | 5 | 1 | 4 | 6 | 5 | 12 | 0.417 | 339 | 377 | 0.899 | |
| 6 | Egypt | 5 | 0 | 5 | 5 | 0 | 15 | 0.000 | 198 | 375 | 0.528 | |

| Date | Time | | Score | | Set 1 | Set 2 | Set 3 | Set 4 | Set 5 | Total | Report |
|---|---|---|---|---|---|---|---|---|---|---|---|
| 30 Aug | 14:00 | Netherlands | 3–1 | Romania | 25–22 | 25–19 | 27–29 | 25–16 | | 102–86 | Report |
| 30 Aug | 17:00 | Egypt | 0–3 | Canada | 9–25 | 23–25 | 12–25 | | | 44–75 | Report |
| 30 Aug | 19:30 | Cuba | 2–3 | South Korea | 20–25 | 25–18 | 25–20 | 21–25 | 12–15 | 103–103 | Report |
| 31 Aug | 14:00 | Netherlands | 3–0 | Egypt | 25–12 | 25–13 | 25–13 | | | 75–38 | Report |
| 31 Aug | 17:00 | Canada | 2–3 | Cuba | 25–22 | 22–25 | 25–21 | 14–25 | 10–15 | 96–108 | Report |
| 31 Aug | 19:30 | Romania | 1–3 | South Korea | 17–25 | 21–25 | 25–22 | 22–25 | | 85–97 | Report |
| 1 Sep | 14:00 | Cuba | 3–0 | Netherlands | 25–19 | 25–19 | 25–20 | | | 75–58 | Report |
| 1 Sep | 17:00 | South Korea | 3–0 | Canada | 25–11 | 25–19 | 25–15 | | | 75–45 | Report |
| 1 Sep | 19:30 | Egypt | 0–3 | Romania | 14–25 | 13–25 | 14–25 | | | 41–75 | Report |
| 2 Sep | 14:00 | Netherlands | 0–3 | South Korea | 23–25 | 18–25 | 22–25 | | | 63–75 | Report |
| 2 Sep | 17:00 | Egypt | 0–3 | Cuba | 11–25 | 13–25 | 13–25 | | | 37–75 | Report |
| 2 Sep | 19:30 | Romania | 3–0 | Canada | 25–21 | 25–18 | 25–22 | | | 75–61 | Report |
| 3 Sep | 14:00 | South Korea | 3–0 | Egypt | 25–13 | 25–10 | 25–15 | | | 75–38 | Report |
| 3 Sep | 17:00 | Cuba | 3–0 | Romania | 25–18 | 25–21 | 25–23 | | | 75–62 | Report |
| 3 Sep | 19:30 | Canada | 0–3 | Netherlands | 18–25 | 21–25 | 23–25 | | | 62–75 | Report |

==== Pool C ====
Venues: Sachsen Arena, Riesa and Mehrzweckhalle, Dresden

| Pos | Team | Pld | W | L | Pts | SW | SL | SR | SPW | SPL | SPR | Qualification |
|---|---|---|---|---|---|---|---|---|---|---|---|---|
| 1 | United States | 5 | 5 | 0 | 10 | 15 | 2 | 7.500 | 408 | 334 | 1.222 | Second round |
| 2 | Russia | 5 | 4 | 1 | 9 | 14 | 4 | 3.500 | 424 | 296 | 1.432 | Second round |
| 3 | Puerto Rico | 5 | 3 | 2 | 8 | 9 | 9 | 1.000 | 364 | 404 | 0.901 | Second round |
| 4 | Dominican Republic | 5 | 2 | 3 | 7 | 7 | 9 | 0.778 | 350 | 369 | 0.949 | |
| 5 | Argentina | 5 | 1 | 4 | 6 | 5 | 12 | 0.417 | 348 | 387 | 0.899 | |
| 6 | Kenya | 5 | 0 | 5 | 5 | 1 | 15 | 0.067 | 290 | 394 | 0.736 | |

| Date | Time | Venue | | Score | | Set 1 | Set 2 | Set 3 | Set 4 | Set 5 | Total | Report |
|---|---|---|---|---|---|---|---|---|---|---|---|---|
| 30 Aug | 17:30 | Riesa | Kenya | 1–3 | Puerto Rico | 18–25 | 25–19 | 14–25 | 23–25 | | 80–94 | Report |
| 30 Aug | 19:00 | Dresden | Russia | 3–1 | Dominican Republic | 25–11 | 21–25 | 25–18 | 25–18 | | 96–72 | Report |
| 30 Aug | 20:00 | Riesa | Argentina | 0–3 | United States | 21–25 | 23–25 | 21–25 | | | 65–75 | Report |
| 31 Aug | 15:00 | Riesa | Kenya | 0–3 | Argentina | 14–25 | 22–25 | 20–25 | | | 56–75 | Report |
| 31 Aug | 17:00 | Dresden | Puerto Rico | 3–0 | Dominican Republic | 25–19 | 28–26 | 25–22 | | | 78–67 | Report |
| 31 Aug | 17:30 | Riesa | United States | 3–2 | Russia | 22–25 | 25–22 | 25–23 | 19–25 | 15–8 | 106–103 | Report |
| 1 Sep | 15:00 | Riesa | Argentina | 2–3 | Puerto Rico | 25–23 | 23–25 | 19–25 | 25–17 | 13–15 | 105–105 | Report |
| 1 Sep | 17:00 | Dresden | Russia | 3–0 | Kenya | 25–14 | 25–15 | 25–15 | | | 75–44 | Report |
| 1 Sep | 17:30 | Riesa | Dominican Republic | 0–3 | United States | 22–25 | 17–25 | 21–25 | | | 60–75 | Report |
| 2 Sep | 14:00 | Riesa | Kenya | 0–3 | Dominican Republic | 20–25 | 20–25 | 21–25 | | | 61–75 | Report |
| 2 Sep | 17:30 | Riesa | Argentina | 0–3 | Russia | 16–25 | 10–25 | 18–25 | | | 44–75 | Report |
| 2 Sep | 19:00 | Dresden | Puerto Rico | 0–3 | United States | 13–25 | 25–27 | 19–25 | | | 57–77 | Report |
| 3 Sep | 14:00 | Riesa | United States | 3–0 | Kenya | 25–19 | 25–17 | 25–13 | | | 75–49 | Report |
| 3 Sep | 17:30 | Riesa | Russia | 3–0 | Puerto Rico | 25–9 | 25–13 | 25–8 | | | 75–30 | Report |
| 3 Sep | 19:00 | Dresden | Dominican Republic | 3–0 | Argentina | 25–20 | 26–24 | 25–15 | | | 76–59 | Report |

==== Pool D ====
Venue: Mehrzwecksporthalle, Leipzig

| Pos | Team | Pld | W | L | Pts | SW | SL | SR | SPW | SPL | SPR | Qualification |
|---|---|---|---|---|---|---|---|---|---|---|---|---|
| 1 | Brazil | 5 | 4 | 1 | 9 | 13 | 3 | 4.333 | 389 | 320 | 1.216 | Second round |
| 2 | China | 5 | 4 | 1 | 9 | 12 | 5 | 2.400 | 407 | 336 | 1.211 | Second round |
| 3 | Greece | 5 | 4 | 1 | 9 | 12 | 6 | 2.000 | 412 | 400 | 1.030 | Second round |
| 4 | Poland | 5 | 2 | 3 | 7 | 8 | 9 | 0.889 | 383 | 388 | 0.987 | |
| 5 | Thailand | 5 | 1 | 4 | 6 | 4 | 13 | 0.308 | 343 | 397 | 0.864 | |
| 6 | Australia | 5 | 0 | 5 | 5 | 2 | 15 | 0.133 | 324 | 417 | 0.777 | |

| Date | Time | | Score | | Set 1 | Set 2 | Set 3 | Set 4 | Set 5 | Total | Report |
|---|---|---|---|---|---|---|---|---|---|---|---|
| 30 Aug | 14:00 | Poland | 0–3 | Brazil | 18–25 | 19–25 | 18–25 | | | 55–75 | Report |
| 30 Aug | 17:30 | China | 3–0 | Australia | 25–12 | 25–18 | 25–16 | | | 75–46 | Report |
| 30 Aug | 20:00 | Thailand | 0–3 | Greece | 19–25 | 18–25 | 23–25 | | | 60–75 | Report |
| 31 Aug | 14:30 | Brazil | 1–3 | China | 23–25 | 25–23 | 17–25 | 23–25 | | 88–98 | Report |
| 31 Aug | 17:30 | Thailand | 0–3 | Poland | 23–25 | 23–25 | 17–25 | | | 63–75 | Report |
| 31 Aug | 20:00 | Greece | 3–1 | Australia | 25–18 | 25–20 | 19–25 | 25–19 | | 94–82 | Report |
| 1 Sep | 14:00 | China | 3–1 | Thailand | 25–20 | 25–16 | 21–25 | 25–9 | | 96–70 | Report |
| 1 Sep | 17:00 | Australia | 0–3 | Brazil | 19–25 | 17–25 | 24–26 | | | 60–76 | Report |
| 1 Sep | 20:00 | Poland | 2–3 | Greece | 31–33 | 25–16 | 23–25 | 27–25 | 14–16 | 120–115 | Report |
| 2 Sep | 14:00 | Greece | 0–3 | Brazil | 18–25 | 12–25 | 23–25 | | | 53–75 | Report |
| 2 Sep | 17:30 | Thailand | 3–1 | Australia | 25–18 | 21–25 | 25–17 | 25–16 | | 96–76 | Report |
| 2 Sep | 20:00 | Poland | 0–3 | China | 20–25 | 19–25 | 18–25 | | | 57–75 | Report |
| 3 Sep | 14:00 | Brazil | 3–0 | Thailand | 25–22 | 25–13 | 25–19 | | | 75–54 | Report |
| 3 Sep | 17:30 | China | 0–3 | Greece | 20–25 | 22–25 | 21–25 | | | 63–75 | Report |
| 3 Sep | 20:00 | Australia | 0–3 | Poland | 24–26 | 22–25 | 14–25 | | | 60–76 | Report |

=== Second round ===
==== Pool E ====
Venue: Stadthalle, Bremen

| Pos | Team | Pld | W | L | Pts | SW | SL | SR | SPW | SPL | SPR | Qualification |
|---|---|---|---|---|---|---|---|---|---|---|---|---|
| 1 | Russia | 3 | 3 | 0 | 6 | 9 | 3 | 3.000 | 285 | 239 | 1.192 | Final round |
| 2 | Cuba | 3 | 2 | 1 | 5 | 7 | 5 | 1.400 | 270 | 277 | 0.975 | Final round |
| 3 | Italy | 3 | 1 | 2 | 4 | 6 | 6 | 1.000 | 275 | 263 | 1.046 | Final round |
| 4 | Greece | 3 | 0 | 3 | 3 | 1 | 9 | 0.111 | 196 | 247 | 0.794 | |

| Date | Time | | Score | | Set 1 | Set 2 | Set 3 | Set 4 | Set 5 | Total | Report |
|---|---|---|---|---|---|---|---|---|---|---|---|
| 6 Sep | 16:00 | Cuba | 3–1 | Greece | 19–25 | 25–21 | 25–15 | 25–18 | | 94–79 | Report |
| 6 Sep | 18:30 | Italy | 2–3 | Russia | 18–25 | 26–24 | 17–25 | 25–21 | 13–15 | 99–110 | Report |
| 7 Sep | 14:00 | Greece | 0–3 | Russia | 21–25 | 26–28 | 17–25 | | | 64–78 | Report |
| 7 Sep | 16:30 | Cuba | 3–1 | Italy | 32–30 | 17–25 | 25–22 | 26–24 | | 100–101 | Report |
| 8 Sep | 14:00 | Italy | 3–0 | Greece | 25–14 | 25–23 | 25–16 | | | 75–53 | Report |
| 8 Sep | 16:30 | Russia | 3–1 | Cuba | 22–25 | 25–19 | 25–15 | 25–17 | | 97–76 | Report |

==== Pool F ====
Venue: Hanns-Martin-Schleyer-Halle, Stuttgart

| Pos | Team | Pld | W | L | Pts | SW | SL | SR | SPW | SPL | SPR | Qualification |
|---|---|---|---|---|---|---|---|---|---|---|---|---|
| 1 | South Korea | 3 | 2 | 1 | 5 | 7 | 3 | 2.333 | 231 | 206 | 1.121 | Final round |
| 2 | China | 3 | 2 | 1 | 5 | 6 | 3 | 2.000 | 216 | 172 | 1.256 | Final round |
| 3 | Bulgaria | 3 | 2 | 1 | 5 | 6 | 4 | 1.500 | 228 | 204 | 1.118 | Final round |
| 4 | Puerto Rico | 3 | 0 | 3 | 3 | 0 | 9 | 0.000 | 132 | 225 | 0.587 | |

| Date | Time | | Score | | Set 1 | Set 2 | Set 3 | Set 4 | Set 5 | Total | Report |
|---|---|---|---|---|---|---|---|---|---|---|---|
| 6 Sep | 16:00 | Bulgaria | 0–3 | China | 22–25 | 15–25 | 19–25 | | | 56–75 | Report |
| 6 Sep | 18:30 | South Korea | 3–0 | Puerto Rico | 25–14 | 25–12 | 25–17 | | | 75–43 | Report |
| 7 Sep | 14:00 | China | 3–0 | Puerto Rico | 25–13 | 25–14 | 25–14 | | | 75–41 | Report |
| 7 Sep | 16:30 | Bulgaria | 3–1 | South Korea | 19–25 | 28–26 | 25–14 | 25–16 | | 97–81 | Report |
| 8 Sep | 14:00 | Puerto Rico | 0–3 | Bulgaria | 15–25 | 16–25 | 17–25 | | | 48–75 | Report |
| 8 Sep | 16:30 | South Korea | 3–0 | China | 25–22 | 25–21 | 25–23 | | | 75–66 | Report |

==== Pool G ====
Venue: Sachsen Arena, Riesa

| Pos | Team | Pld | W | L | Pts | SW | SL | SR | SPW | SPL | SPR | Qualification |
|---|---|---|---|---|---|---|---|---|---|---|---|---|
| 1 | United States | 3 | 3 | 0 | 6 | 9 | 2 | 4.500 | 260 | 231 | 1.126 | Final round |
| 2 | Brazil | 3 | 2 | 1 | 5 | 6 | 4 | 1.500 | 233 | 221 | 1.054 | Final round |
| 3 | Netherlands | 3 | 1 | 2 | 4 | 6 | 7 | 0.857 | 271 | 288 | 0.941 | |
| 4 | Germany | 3 | 0 | 3 | 3 | 1 | 9 | 0.111 | 227 | 251 | 0.904 | |

| Date | Time | | Score | | Set 1 | Set 2 | Set 3 | Set 4 | Set 5 | Total | Report |
|---|---|---|---|---|---|---|---|---|---|---|---|
| 6 Sep | 16:00 | Brazil | 0–3 | United States | 20–25 | 21–25 | 24–26 | | | 65–76 | Report |
| 6 Sep | 18:30 | Germany | 1–3 | Netherlands | 25–18 | 26–28 | 17–25 | 23–25 | | 91–96 | Report |
| 7 Sep | 14:30 | Brazil | 3–0 | Germany | 25–20 | 25–23 | 25–22 | | | 75–65 | Report |
| 7 Sep | 17:00 | United States | 3–2 | Netherlands | 25–15 | 18–25 | 25–17 | 21–25 | 15–13 | 104–95 | Report |
| 8 Sep | 14:00 | Netherlands | 1–3 | Brazil | 17–25 | 25–17 | 24–26 | 14–25 | | 80–93 | Report |
| 8 Sep | 17:00 | Germany | 0–3 | United States | 26–28 | 20–25 | 25–27 | | | 71–80 | Report |

=== Final round ===
Venues: Stadthalle, Bremen and Hanns-Martin-Schleyer-Halle, Stuttgart and Max-Schmeling-Halle, Berlin

Quarterfinals
11 September – Bremen
Russia | 3
Bulgaria | 0
11 September – Bremen
United States | 3
Cuba | 0
11 September – Stuttgart
South Korea | 0
Italy | 3
11 September – Stuttgart
China | 3
Brazil | 2

Semifinals
13 September – Berlin
Russia | 2
United States | 3
13 September – Berlin
Italy | 3
China | 1

Final
15 September – Berlin
United States | 2
Italy | 3
3rd place
14 September – Berlin
Russia | 3
China | 1

5th–8th semifinals
12 September – Bremen
Bulgaria | 2
Cuba | 3
12 September – Stuttgart
South Korea | 3
Brazil | 2

5th place
15 September – Berlin
Cuba | 3
South Korea | 2
7th place
14 September – Berlin
Bulgaria | 0
Brazil | 3

==== Quarterfinals ====
| Date | Time | Venue | | Score | | Set 1 | Set 2 | Set 3 | Set 4 | Set 5 | Total | Report |
|---|---|---|---|---|---|---|---|---|---|---|---|---|
| 11 Sep | 18:00 | Bremen | Russia | 3–0 | Bulgaria | 25–13 | 25–21 | 25–19 | | | 75–53 | Report |
| 11 Sep | 18:00 | Stuttgart | South Korea | 0–3 | Italy | 20–25 | 22–25 | 19–25 | | | 61–75 | Report |
| 11 Sep | 20:30 | Bremen | United States | 3–0 | Cuba | 25–22 | 25–15 | 25–21 | | | 75–58 | Report |
| 11 Sep | 20:30 | Stuttgart | China | 3–2 | Brazil | 25–19 | 21–25 | 23–25 | 25–15 | 15–9 | 109–93 | Report |

==== 5th–8th places ====
===== 5th–8th Semifinals =====
| Date | Time | Venue | | Score | | Set 1 | Set 2 | Set 3 | Set 4 | Set 5 | Total | Report |
|---|---|---|---|---|---|---|---|---|---|---|---|---|
| 12 Sep | 20:30 | Bremen | Bulgaria | 2–3 | Cuba | 26–24 | 29–27 | 16–25 | 26–28 | 9–15 | 106–119 | Report |
| 12 Sep | 20:30 | Stuttgart | South Korea | 3–2 | Brazil | 25–23 | 19–25 | 25–22 | 21–25 | 15–8 | 105–103 | Report |

===== 7th place match =====
| Date | Time | Venue | | Score | | Set 1 | Set 2 | Set 3 | Set 4 | Set 5 | Total | Report |
|---|---|---|---|---|---|---|---|---|---|---|---|---|
| 14 Sep | 15:00 | Berlin | Bulgaria | 0–3 | Brazil | 22–25 | 22–25 | 21–25 | | | 65–75 | Report |

===== 5th place match =====
| Date | Time | Venue | | Score | | Set 1 | Set 2 | Set 3 | Set 4 | Set 5 | Total | Report |
|---|---|---|---|---|---|---|---|---|---|---|---|---|
| 15 Sep | 12:00 | Berlin | Cuba | 3–2 | South Korea | 21–25 | 25–19 | 25–11 | 22–25 | 15–10 | 108–90 | Report |

==== Finals ====
===== Semifinals =====
| Date | Time | Venue | | Score | | Set 1 | Set 2 | Set 3 | Set 4 | Set 5 | Total | Report |
|---|---|---|---|---|---|---|---|---|---|---|---|---|
| 13 Sep | 15:00 | Berlin | Russia | 2–3 | United States | 25–21 | 23–25 | 20–25 | 25–21 | 8–15 | 101–107 | Report |
| 13 Sep | 18:00 | Berlin | Italy | 3–1 | China | 25–21 | 25–20 | 21–25 | 25–23 | | 96–89 | Report |

===== 3rd place match =====
| Date | Time | Venue | | Score | | Set 1 | Set 2 | Set 3 | Set 4 | Set 5 | Total | Report |
|---|---|---|---|---|---|---|---|---|---|---|---|---|
| 14 Sep | 18:00 | Berlin | Russia | 3–1 | China | 25–20 | 21–25 | 25–23 | 25–16 | | 96–84 | Report |

===== Final =====
| Date | Time | Venue | | Score | | Set 1 | Set 2 | Set 3 | Set 4 | Set 5 | Total | Report |
|---|---|---|---|---|---|---|---|---|---|---|---|---|
| 15 Sep | 15:00 | Berlin | United States | 2–3 | Italy | 25–18 | 18–25 | 16–25 | 25–22 | 11–15 | 95–105 | Report |

== Final standing ==
| Rank | Team |
|---|---|
| 1st place, gold medalist(s) | Italy |
| 2nd place, silver medalist(s) | United States |
| 3rd place, bronze medalist(s) | Russia |
| 4 | China |
| 5 | Cuba |
| 6 | South Korea |
| 7 | Brazil |
| 8 | Bulgaria |
| 9 | Netherlands |
| 10 | Germany |
| 10 | Greece |
| 10 | Puerto Rico |
| 13 | Dominican Republic |
| 13 | Japan |
| 13 | Poland |
| 13 | Romania |
| 17 | Argentina |
| 17 | Canada |
| 17 | Czech Republic |
| 17 | Thailand |
| 21 | Australia |
| 21 | Egypt |
| 21 | Kenya |
| 21 | Mexico |

2002 Women's World champions

Italy
1st title

Team roster
Simona Rinieri, Elisa Togut, Manuela Leggeri, Sara Anzanello, Paola Paggi, Darina Mifkova, Francesca Piccinini, Rachele Sangiuliano, Eleonora Lo Bianco, Valentina Borrelli, Anna Vania Mello and Paola Cardullo
Head coach
Marco Bonitta

== Awards ==
- Most valuable player
  (Italy) Elisa Togut
- Best scorer
  (Cuba) Yumilka Ruíz
- Best spiker
  (Russia) Elizaveta Tichtchenko
- Best blocker
  (United States) Danielle Scott
- Best server
  (Cuba) Nancy Carrillo
- Best setter
  (Brazil) Marcelle Moraes
- Best digger
  (South Korea) Koo Ki-lan
- Best receiver
  (South Korea) Koo Ki-lan
- Fair play award
  (Italy) Paola Cardullo
