= 1998 FIVB Women's Volleyball World Championship squads =

This article shows all participating team squads at the 1998 FIVB Women's World Championship, held from November 3 to November 12, 1998 in Japan.

== Bulgaria ==
- Head coach: Stefan Panchev

| # | Name | Date of birth | Height | Weight | Spike | Block |
|---|---|---|---|---|---|---|
| 3 | Antonina Zetova | 09.07.1973 | 189 | 75 | 298 | 288 |
| 4 | Vanya Sokolova | 22.06.1971 | 189 | 76 | 298 | 290 |
| 6 | Dessislava Velitchkova | 22.12.1972 | 183 | | 300 | 297 |
| 7 | Neli Marinova | 27.05.1971 | 173 | 62 | 284 | 280 |
| 8 | Slavka Ouzounova | 30.07.1971 | 184 | | 302 | 290 |
| 9 | Teodora Betcheva | 19.03.1971 | 180 | | 292 | 290 |
| 10 | Dessislava Nikodimova | 23.06.1966 | 186 | | 294 | 291 |
| 11 | Emilia Pashova | 23.09.1966 | 187 | | 302 | 295 |
| 13 | Aneta Germanova | 01.03.1975 | 186 | 72 | 284 | 292 |
| 14 | Iliyana Gocheva | 11.02.1976 | 188 | 68 | 290 | 281 |
| 17 | Anna Ivanova | 06.02.1978 | 187 | | 296 | 291 |
| 18 | Iliyana Petkova | 11.10.1977 | 190 | 72 | 300 | 294 |

== Brazil ==
- Head coach: Bernardo Rezende

| # | Name | Date of birth | Height | Weight | Spike | Block |
|---|---|---|---|---|---|---|
| 2 | Ana Moser | 14.08.1968 | 185 | | 310 | 289 |
| 3 | Janina Conceição | 25.10.1972 | 192 | 82 | 312 | 288 |
| 4 | Raquel Silva | 30.04.1978 | 191 | 69 | 300 | 282 |
| 5 | Ana Flavia Connelly | 13.02.1972 | 183 | | 309 | 284 |
| 8 | Leila Barros | 30.09.1971 | 179 | 71 | 300 | 291 |
| 10 | Virna Dias | 31.08.1971 | 184 | 70 | 306 | 294 |
| 11 | Karin Negrão | 08.11.1971 | 187 | 77 | 309 | 285 |
| 13 | Ana Flavia Sanglard | 20.06.1970 | 187 | | 299 | 290 |
| 14 | Fernanda Venturini | 24.10.1970 | 180 | | 292 | 280 |
| 15 | Hélia Souza | 10.03.1970 | 173 | 63 | 283 | 265 |
| 16 | Erika Coimbra | 23.03.1980 | 180 | 64 | 301 | 280 |
| 17 | Sandra Suruagy | 17.04.1963 | 178 | | 297 | 288 |

== China ==
- Head coach: Lang Ping

| # | Name | Date of birth | Height | Weight | Spike | Block |
|---|---|---|---|---|---|---|
| 1 | Lai Yawen | 09.09.1970 | 187 | | 319 | 305 |
| 2 | Li Yan | 01.05.1976 | 178 | 75 | 312 | 306 |
| 3 | Cui Yongmei | 25.01.1969 | 181 | | 306 | 285 |
| 4 | Zhu Yunying | 15.01.1978 | 175 | 64 | 300 | 280 |
| 5 | Wu Yongmei | 01.01.1975 | 186 | 74 | 317 | 295 |
| 7 | He Qi | 24.08.1973 | 178 | 68 | 305 | 295 |
| 8 | Yin Yin | 02.01.1974 | 183 | 73 | 322 | 310 |
| 9 | Li Yizhi | 11.01.1977 | 179 | | 312 | 306 |
| 10 | Wang Ziling | 14.01.1972 | 181 | | 305 | 290 |
| 11 | Sun Yue | 15.03.1973 | 186 | 76 | 314 | 290 |
| 12 | Qiu Aihua | 28.01.1977 | 182 | 75 | 308 | 302 |
| 15 | Wang Lina | 05.02.1978 | 181 | 75 | 318 | 295 |

== Croatia ==
- Head coach: Ivica Jelić

| # | Name | Date of birth | Height | Weight | Spike | Block |
|---|---|---|---|---|---|---|
| 3 | Tatyana Sidorenko | 04.07.1966 | 186 | | 305 | 295 |
| 4 | Marijana Ribičić | 21.02.1979 | 186 | | 290 | 280 |
| 5 | Snježana Mijić | 25.12.1971 | 181 | | 295 | 280 |
| 6 | Marija Anzulović | 31.10.1968 | 178 | | 295 | 270 |
| 7 | Slavica Kuzmanić | 27.03.1972 | 190 | | 310 | 290 |
| 8 | Barbara Jelić | 08.05.1977 | 193 | | 320 | 300 |
| 9 | Vanesa Sršen | 23.12.1971 | 184 | | 295 | 285 |
| 10 | Maria Likhtenchtein | 07.02.1976 | 180 | | 285 | 278 |
| 11 | Elena Cebukina | 11.10.1965 | 188 | | 305 | 290 |
| 12 | Irina Kirillova | 15.05.1965 | 177 | | 300 | 285 |
| 13 | Ivana Troma | 05.01.1980 | 176 | | 282 | 273 |
| 14 | Nataša Leto | 27.05.1976 | 183 | | 295 | 287 |

== Cuba ==
- Head coach: Antonio Perdomo

| # | Name | Date of birth | Height | Weight | Spike | Block |
|---|---|---|---|---|---|---|
| 1 | Yumilka Ruiz | 08.05.1978 | 179 | 65 | 329 | 311 |
| 2 | Marlenis Costa | 30.07.1973 | 176 | 76 | 334 | 312 |
| 3 | Mireya Luis | 28.08.1967 | 175 | | 335 | 316 |
| 4 | Lilian Izquierdo | 10.02.1967 | 174 | | 319 | 308 |
| 8 | Regla Bell | 06.07.1971 | 180 | | 326 | 315 |
| 9 | Indira Mestre | 21.04.1979 | 181 | | 332 | 329 |
| 10 | Regla Torres | 12.02.1975 | 191 | | 342 | 332 |
| 11 | Liana Mesa | 26.12.1977 | 179 | | 338 | 311 |
| 12 | Taismary Agüero | 05.03.1977 | 176 | | 318 | 304 |
| 14 | Ana Fernández | 03.08.1973 | 185 | | 326 | 312 |
| 16 | Mirka Francia | 14.02.1975 | 182 | | 324 | 310 |
| 17 | Martha Sánchez | 17.05.1973 | 182 | | 324 | 310 |

== Dominican Republic ==
- Head coach: Jorge Pérez Vento

| # | Name | Date of birth | Height | Weight | Spike | Block |
|---|---|---|---|---|---|---|
| 1 | Annerys Vargas | 07.08.1981 | 191 | 70 | 303 | 298 |
| 3 | Yudelkys Bautista | 05.12.1974 | 192 | 68 | 312 | 307 |
| 4 | Flor Colón | 26.09.1969 | 188 | | 306 | 300 |
| 6 | Berenice Restituyo | 11.05.1977 | 184 | | 299 | 291 |
| 7 | Sofía Mercedes | 25.05.1976 | 185 | 70 | 306 | 298 |
| 8 | Yndys Novas | 07.11.1977 | 185 | 69 | 302 | 295 |
| 9 | Nuris Arias | 20.05.1978 | 191 | 71 | 310 | 302 |
| 10 | Milagros Cabral | 17.10.1978 | 185 | 63 | 308 | 305 |
| 11 | Juana Miguelina González | 03.01.1979 | 185 | 70 | 295 | 290 |
| 12 | Francia Jackson | 08.11.1975 | 168 | 71 | 280 | 275 |
| 15 | Cosiri Rodríguez | 30.08.1977 | 191 | 72 | 313 | 305 |
| 18 | Gisselinet Raposo | 06.05.1978 | 193 | | 315 | 307 |

== Germany ==
- Head coach: Siegfried Köhler

| # | Name | Date of birth | Height | Weight | Spike | Block |
|---|---|---|---|---|---|---|
| 1 | Hanka Pachale | 12.09.1976 | 190 | 74 | 316 | 299 |
| 2 | Béatrice Dömeland | 04.08.1973 | 178 | 63 | 300 | 287 |
| 3 | Tanja Hart | 24.01.1974 | 176 | 70 | 290 | 275 |
| 4 | Kerstin Tzscherlich | 15.02.1978 | 179 | 75 | 295 | 282 |
| 5 | Sylvia Roll | 29.05.1973 | 180 | 72 | 308 | 286 |
| 6 | Nancy Celis | 09.11.1966 | 188 | | 315 | 291 |
| 7 | Johanna Reinink | 22.06.1974 | 190 | | 303 | 290 |
| 9 | Christina Benecke | 14.10.1974 | 190 | 80 | 314 | 291 |
| 12 | Judith Flemig | 22.05.1979 | 188 | 63 | 304 | 283 |
| 13 | Susanne Lahme | 10.09.1968 | 182 | 62 | 308 | 292 |
| 15 | Angelina Grün | 02.12.1979 | 185 | 67 | 309 | 287 |
| 18 | Claudia Wilke | 28.05.1971 | 184 | | 309 | 286 |

== Italy ==
- Head coach: Angelo Frigoni

| # | Name | Date of birth | Height | Weight | Spike | Block |
|---|---|---|---|---|---|---|
| 1 | Simona Gioli | 17.09.1977 | 185 | | 307 | 283 |
| 2 | Simona Rinieri | 01.09.1977 | 188 | | 307 | 281 |
| 3 | Elisa Togut | 14.05.1978 | 192 | | 320 | 295 |
| 4 | Manuela Leggeri | 09.05.1976 | 183 | | 312 | 281 |
| 7 | Maurizia Cacciatori | 06.04.1973 | 178 | | 298 | 274 |
| 8 | Sabrina Bertini | 30.10.1969 | 182 | | 304 | 277 |
| 9 | Elisa Galastri | 21.08.1978 | 183 | | 307 | 292 |
| 11 | Darina Mifkova | 24.05.1974 | 185 | | 308 | 279 |
| 12 | Francesca Piccinini | 10.01.1979 | 180 | | 304 | 279 |
| 14 | Eleonora Lobianco | 22.12.1979 | 172 | | 287 | 273 |
| 16 | Anna Vania Mello | 27.02.1979 | 183 | | 310 | 278 |
| 18 | Antonella Bragaglia | 04.02.1973 | 184 | | 309 | 282 |

== Japan ==
- Head coach: Nobuchika Kuzuwa

| # | Name | Date of birth | Height | Weight | Spike | Block |
|---|---|---|---|---|---|---|
| 1 | Asako Tajimi | 26.06.1972 | 179 | | 308 | 290 |
| 3 | Hiroko Tsukumo | 11.09.1970 | 175 | 60 | 293 | 279 |
| 4 | Chie Kanda | 12.04.1971 | 183 | | 312 | 292 |
| 5 | Naomi Eto | 12.07.1972 | 186 | | 315 | 300 |
| 6 | Minako Onuki | 15.10.1972 | 173 | | 300 | 289 |
| 8 | Chikako Kumamae | 11.04.1974 | 180 | | 304 | 295 |
| 9 | Junko Moriyama | 26.02.1975 | 180 | | 297 | 292 |
| 11 | Hitomi Mitsunaga | 03.06.1976 | 180 | | 315 | 293 |
| 12 | Ikumi Ogake | 01.01.1976 | 173 | | 297 | 276 |
| 13 | Miki Sasaki | 15.12.1976 | 182 | | 315 | 293 |
| 15 | Hiromi Suzuki | 14.11.1978 | 184 | | 300 | 281 |
| 18 | Eriko Isobe | 23.08.1977 | 168 | | 280 | 271 |

== Kenya ==
- Head coach: Gibert Ohanya

| # | Name | Date of birth | Height | Weight | Spike | Block |
|---|---|---|---|---|---|---|
| 2 | Margaret Indakala | 24.08.1962 | 178 | | 290 | 278 |
| 5 | Catherine Mabwi | 01.08.1966 | 173 | | 289 | 272 |
| 6 | Edna Chepngeno | 15.07.1977 | 178 | | 287 | 275 |
| 7 | Doris Wefwafwa | 24.12.1966 | 170 | | 292 | 294 |
| 8 | Helen Elele | 09.09.1973 | 179 | | 290 | 275 |
| 9 | Dorcas Nakhomicha Ndasaba | 31.03.1971 | 174 | | 288 | 272 |
| 10 | Roselidah Obunaga | 23.12.1973 | 180 | | 287 | 277 |
| 11 | Jacqueline Makokha | 15.11.1974 | 175 | | 288 | 274 |
| 12 | Esther Cheboo | 06.06.1968 | 182 | | 295 | 290 |
| 15 | Mary Kochwa | 23.10.1966 | 169 | | 275 | 260 |
| 16 | Nancy Waswa | 28.12.1971 | 170 | | 289 | 270 |
| 18 | Judith Serenge | 21.01.1971 | 150 | | 270 | 250 |

== Netherlands ==
- Head coach: Pierre Mathieu

| # | Name | Date of birth | Height | Weight | Spike | Block |
|---|---|---|---|---|---|---|
| 2 | Jettie Fokkens | 26.09.1975 | 178 | | 300 | 292 |
| 3 | Francien Huurman | 18.04.1975 | 192 | | 316 | 302 |
| 5 | Cintha Boersma | 01.05.1969 | 182 | | 308 | 294 |
| 6 | Suzanne Luttikhuis | 25.07.1977 | 191 | | 310 | 298 |
| 7 | Irena Machovcak | 13.11.1968 | 186 | | 310 | 294 |
| 8 | Claudia van Thiel | 22.12.1977 | 184 | | 309 | 291 |
| 9 | Irma de Haas | 29.12.1975 | 170 | | 285 | 276 |
| 11 | Kitty Sanders | 04.04.1980 | 186 | | 305 | 293 |
| 12 | Elles Leferink | 14.11.1976 | 176 | | 299 | 284 |
| 13 | Chaïne Staelens | 07.11.1980 | 191 | | 285 | 278 |
| 14 | Riëtte Fledderus | 18.10.1977 | 168 | | 284 | 276 |
| 15 | Ingrid Visser | 04.06.1977 | 190 | | 306 | 294 |

== Peru ==
- Head coach: Luis Oviedo Bonilla

| # | Name | Date of birth | Height | Weight | Spike | Block |
|---|---|---|---|---|---|---|
| 2 | Iris Falcón | 01.11.1973 | 173 | 78 | 300 | 293 |
| 5 | Leyla Chihuán | 04.09.1975 | 180 | | 310 | 303 |
| 7 | Milagros Cámere | 22.09.1972 | 178 | | 302 | 298 |
| 9 | Luren Baylón Francis | 14.08.1977 | 181 | | 300 | 295 |
| 10 | Fiorella Aíta | 13.07.1977 | 171 | | 301 | 293 |
| 11 | Yulissa Zamudio | 24.03.1976 | 183 | | 310 | 303 |
| 13 | Elizabeth Castillo | 21.07.1975 | 173 | | 300 | 292 |
| 14 | Roxana Huamán | 10.10.1973 | 175 | | 295 | 285 |
| 15 | Yvon Cancino | 03.03.1979 | 170 | | 292 | 290 |
| 16 | Jessica Tejada | 28.02.1971 | 171 | | 298 | 292 |
| 17 | Patricia Soto | 10.02.1980 | 179 | | 300 | 295 |
| 18 | Sahara Castillo | 16.07.1981 | 176 | | 295 | 285 |

== Russia ==
- Head coach: Nikolay Karpol

| # | Name | Date of birth | Height | Weight | Spike | Block |
|---|---|---|---|---|---|---|
| 1 | Irina Tebenikhina | 15.12.1978 | 190 | | 306 | 300 |
| 2 | Natalya Morozova | 28.01.1973 | 188 | | 309 | 305 |
| 3 | Anastasia Belikova | 22.07.1979 | 190 | | 305 | 300 |
| 4 | Elena Plotnikova | 26.07.1978 | 186 | | 306 | 298 |
| 5 | Lioubov Sokolova | 04.12.1977 | 192 | 73 | 310 | 304 |
| 6 | Elena Godina | 17.09.1977 | 197 | | 317 | 310 |
| 7 | Natalya Safronova | 06.02.1979 | 188 | | 306 | 300 |
| 8 | Evgenya Artamonova | 17.07.1975 | 191 | 74 | 312 | 302 |
| 9 | Elizaveta Tichtchenko | 07.02.1975 | 190 | | 309 | 302 |
| 10 | Yelena Vasilevskaya | 27.02.1978 | 177 | | 296 | 290 |
| 11 | Olga Tchoukanova | 09.06.1980 | 181 | | 302 | 295 |
| 17 | Valentina Ogienko | 26.05.1965 | 182 | | 305 | 296 |

== South Korea ==
- Head coach: Kim Hyung-Sil

| # | Name | Date of birth | Height | Weight | Spike | Block |
|---|---|---|---|---|---|---|
| 3 | Kang Hye-Mi | 27.04.1974 | 172 | | 300 | 285 |
| 4 | Ku Min-Jung | 25.08.1973 | 182 | | 315 | 300 |
| 5 | Kang Mee-sun | 27.03.1971 | 175 | | 307 | 289 |
| 6 | Kim Chang-Hun | 10.07.1974 | 168 | | 300 | 285 |
| 7 | Park Mee-Kyung | 13.05.1975 | 181 | | 315 | 303 |
| 8 | Chung Sun-Hye | 17.12.1975 | 174 | | 306 | 290 |
| 9 | Jung Eun-Sun | 06.04.1973 | 177 | | 308 | 291 |
| 10 | Park Soo-Jeong | 02.03.1972 | 178 | | 305 | 295 |
| 11 | Hong Ji-Yeon | 08.09.1970 | 187 | | 314 | 304 |
| 12 | Kim Young-Sook | 13.12.1974 | 178 | | 312 | 293 |
| 15 | Chang So-Yun | 11.11.1974 | 184 | | 312 | 301 |
| 16 | Lee Meong-Hee | 07.04.1978 | 175 | | 279 | 270 |

== Thailand ==
- Head coach: Sathorn Phusanadilok

| # | Name | Date of birth | Height | Weight | Spike | Block |
|---|---|---|---|---|---|---|
| 1 | Piyamas Koijapo | 23.10.1980 | 181 | | 290 | 280 |
| 2 | Wanlapa Jid-ong | 02.06.1977 | 170 | | 275 | 270 |
| 3 | Anna Paijinda | 03.04.1974 | 175 | | 285 | 280 |
| 4 | Laddawan Srisakorn | 11.05.1975 | 175 | | 280 | 275 |
| 6 | Saranya Srisakorn | 11.05.1975 | 175 | | 280 | 270 |
| 7 | Malinee Kongtan | 09.11.1973 | 178 | | 280 | 270 |
| 9 | Bhudsabun Prasaengkaew | 23.03.1972 | 168 | | 275 | 265 |
| 10 | Nantakan Petchplay | 21.03.1977 | 174 | | 280 | 270 |
| 12 | Likhit Namsen | 06.07.1972 | 173 | | 280 | 270 |
| 13 | Rattanaporn Sanuanram | 09.04.1980 | 180 | | 290 | 280 |
| 14 | Patcharee Sangmuang | 20.03.1978 | 181 | | 285 | 275 |
| 16 | Wisuta Heebkaew | 01.02.1980 | 176 | | 280 | 270 |

== United States ==
- Head coach: Mick Haley

| # | Name | Date of birth | Height | Weight | Spike | Block |
|---|---|---|---|---|---|---|
| 1 | Salima Davidson | 24.01.1972 | 175 | | 300 | 290 |
| 2 | Laura Davis | 26.11.1973 | 173 | | 286 | 282 |
| 3 | Makare Desilets | 26.06.1976 | 188 | | 323 | 307 |
| 4 | Kara Milling | 22.09.1976 | 182 | | 318 | 297 |
| 7 | Amy Steele | 18.07.1976 | 188 | | 310 | 290 |
| 8 | Charlene Johnson | 30.08.1973 | 178 | | 286 | 282 |
| 9 | Terri Zemaitis | 28.04.1976 | 188 | | 309 | 290 |
| 10 | Mickisha Hurley | 06.03.1975 | 183 | | 317 | 305 |
| 11 | Sarah Noriega | 24.04.1976 | 187 | | 323 | 307 |
| 12 | Valerie Sterk | 04.12.1975 | 188 | | 309 | 295 |
| 14 | Karrie Downey | 30.05.1973 | 178 | | 304 | 292 |
| 18 | Allison Weston | 19.02.1974 | 183 | | 309 | 295 |
