= 1999 FIVB Volleyball Women's World Cup squads =

This article shows all participating team squads at the 1999 FIVB Women's World Cup, held from November 2 to November 16, 1999 in several cities in Japan.

The 1999 FIVB Women's World Cup featured rosters from twelve of the world's premier national teams, representing a pivotal moment in international volleyball as the tournament served as the first qualifying event for the 2000 Summer Olympics in Sydney. Each squad was permitted a maximum of twelve players, selected to compete in a grueling round-robin format across eight Japanese cities. The rosters showcased a blend of established legends and emerging talent; notably, the Cuba national team featured stars like Regla Torres and Mireya Luis, who led their country to a gold medal finish. Other significant participants included Russia, led by the scoring prowess of Yevgeniya Artamonova, and the Brazil squad, which secured the bronze. These squads are historically significant for representing the peak of the "side-out" scoring era before the widespread adoption of the rally point system in major international play.

== Argentina ==
- Head coach: Claudio Cuello

#	Name	Date of birth	Height	Weight	Spike	Block
1	Celina Crusoe	22.09.1974	178
2	Carolina Costagrande	15.10.1980	188	78	312	300
3	Mariana Conde	23.07.1973	185
4	Romina Lamas	29.08.1978	181	74	298	280
5	Monica Bahnson	31.10.1974	182
6	Ivana Müller	03.07.1974	185
7	María Vincente	25.11.1977	172	59	292	273
9	Marcela Ré	06.07.1980	191
11	Mónica Kostolnik	08.02.1969	172	63	285	270
14	Mirna Ansaldi	10.07.1977	186
16	Marcia Scacchi	29.01.1982	175	70	297	290

== Brazil ==
- Head coach: Bernardo Rezende

#	Name	Date of birth	Height	Weight	Spike	Block
1	Giselle Florentino	01.08.1973	180	71	282	278
2	Ana Moser	14.08.1968	185	70	310	290
3	Janina Conceição	25.10.1972	192	82	312	288
5	Ricarda Lima	12.09.1970	184	66
6	Ângela Moraes	15.10.1972	181	69	311	298
7	Hélia Souza	10.03.1970	173	63	283	264
8	Leila Barros	30.09.1971	179	71	300	291
9	Walewska Oliveira	01.10.1979	190	73	310	290
10	Virna Dias	31.08.1971	184	70	306	294
11	Karin Rodrigues	08.09.1971	187	77	309	285
16	Erika Coimbra	23.03.1980	180	64	301	280
18	Elisângela Oliveira	30.10.1978	184	80	302	282

== China ==
- Head coach: Chen Zhonghe

#	Name	Date of birth	Height	Weight	Spike	Block
—	Gui Chaoran	08.01.1976
—	He Qi	24.08.1973	178
—	Zhu Yunying	15.01.1978	175
—	Li Shan	21.05.1980	185	72	317	300
—	Zhou Suhong	23.04.1979	182	75	313	305
—	Qiu Aihua	28.01.1977	181
—	Wang Lina	05.02.1978	181	75	319	300
—	Lin Wenzhen	01.01.1976
—	Yin Yin	02.02.1974	184	71	308	305
—	Wu Yongmei	01.01.1975	187
—	Sun Yue	15.03.1973	186	76
—	Chen Jing	03.09.1975	182	75

== Croatia ==
- Head coach: Ivica Jelić

#	Name	Date of birth	Height	Weight	Spike	Block
1	Nataša Osmokrović	27.05.1976	184	69	328	320
2	Ingrid Siscovich	06.06.1980	183	71
3	Patricija Daničić	24.01.1978	184
4	Marijana Ribičić	21.02.1979	186	74
7	Slavica Kuzmanić	27.03.1972	190		310	290
8	Barbara Jelić	08.05.1977	193	75	320	300
9	Ana Kaštelan	22.04.1980	185	75
10	Maria Likhtenchtein	07.02.1976	179		285	278
13	Beti Rimac	14.01.1976	191	75
17	Mia Jerkov	05.12.1982	192	72	310	300
18	Maja Poljak	02.05.1983	194	76	315	305
—	Ivana Troma	05.01.1980	176		282	273
—	Tihana Stipanović	09.01.1980	195

== Cuba ==
- Head coach: Antonio Perdomo

#	Name	Date of birth	Height	Weight	Spike	Block
1	Yumilka Ruiz	08.05.1978	179	65	329	311
2	Marlenis Costa	30.07.1973	176	76	334	312
4	Lilian Izquierdo	10.02.1967	174	71	319	308
6	Yoselin Roque	01.01.1970	189
7	Enia Martinez	18.12.1971	185
8	Regla Bell	06.07.1971	181	73	326	315
11	Liana Mesa	26.12.1977	184	73	318	307
12	Taismary Agüero	05.03.1977	177	69	318	304
14	Ana Fernández	03.08.1973	187	78	326	312
16	Mirka Francia	14.02.1975	184	73	324	310
17	Martha Sánchez	17.05.1973	184	75	324	310
—	Aruzima Alvarez	28.07.1978	192

== Italy ==
- Head coach: Angelo Frigoni

#	Name	Date of birth	Height	Weight	Spike	Block
2	Simona Rinieri	01.09.1977	188	80	307	281
3	Elisa Togut	14.05.1978	193	70	320	295
4	Manuela Leggeri	09.05.1976	186	74	312	281
5	Evelyn Marinelli	20.07.1974	174
7	Maurizia Cacciatori	06.04.1973	178	64	298	278
8	Sabrina Bertini	30.10.1969	182	75
9	Elena Galastri	21.08.1978	183
10	Paola Paggi	06.12.1976	182	72	306	278
12	Francesca Piccinini	10.01.1979	184	75	304	279
14	Eleonora Lo Bianco	22.12.1979	171	70	287	273

== Japan ==
- Head coach: Arie Selinger

#	Name	Date of birth	Height	Weight	Spike	Block
—	Megumi Itabashi	07.06.1973	167	62	285	279
—	Minako Onuki	15.10.1972	173	67	300	297
—	Chikako Kumamae	11.04.1974	180	67	318	290
—	Hitomi Mitsunaga	03.06.1976	180	74	305	295
—	Miki Sasaki	15.12.1976	182	77	317	307
—	Asako Tajimi	26.06.1972	180	68	308	290
—	Hiromi Suzuki	14.11.1978	186	72	300	281
—	Junko Moriyama	26.02.1975	180	71	301	293
—	Naomi Eto	12.07.1972	186	62	307	298
—	Hiroko Tsukumo	11.09.1970	175	65	298	285
—	Yuka Sakurai	02.09.1974	167	62	284	272
—	Ikumi Narita	01.01.1976	173	68	299	284

== Peru ==
- Head coach: Man-Bok Park

#	Name	Date of birth	Height	Weight	Spike	Block
2	Iris Falcón	01.11.1973	175	78
3	Rosa García	21.05.1964	175	69
4	Diana Soto	10.02.1980	179	80	300	295
5	Leyla Chihuán	04.09.1975	180	66	306	296
6	Jessica Tejada	28.02.1971	171
7	Yulissa Zamudio	24.03.1976	184	75	315	300
8	Milagros Moy	17.10.1975	175	72	296	285
9	Mariela Portocarrero
11	Sara Joya	13.07.1977	182	70	298	295
12	Natalia Málaga	26.01.1964	170	59	303
—	Roxana Huaman

== Russia ==
- Head coach: Nikolay Karpol

#	Name	Date of birth	Height	Weight	Spike	Block
1	Irina Tebenikhina	15.12.1978	190	76	306	300
2	Natalya Morozova	28.01.1973	188	74	309	305
3	Anastasia Belikova	22.07.1979	190	78	305	300
5	Lioubov Sokolova	04.12.1977	192	73	310	304
6	Elena Godina	17.09.1977	197	72	317	310
7	Natalya Safronova	06.02.1979	188	77	306	300
8	Evgenya Artamonova	17.07.1975	191	74	312	302
9	Elizaveta Tichtchenko	07.02.1975	190	76	309	302
10	Yelena Vasilevskaya	27.02.1978	177	68	296	290
11	Ekaterina Gamova	17.10.1980	204	80	321	310
14	Inessa Sargsyan	17.01.1972	190	75	299	293
18	Elena Sennikova	20.03.1979	180

== South Korea ==
- Head coach: Kim Cheol-yong

#	Name	Date of birth	Height	Weight	Spike	Block
—	Chang So-yun	11.11.1974	184	73
—	Kang Hye-mi	27.04.1974	172	64
—	Ku Min-jung	25.08.1973	182	68
—	Park Mee-kyung	13.05.1975	181	68
—	Park Soo-jeong	02.03.1972	178	68
—	Eoh Yeon-Soon	12.12.1973	178	65	312	293
—	Chang Yoon-Hee	22.05.1970	170

== United States ==
- Head coach: Mick Haley

#	Name	Date of birth	Height	Weight	Spike	Block
1	Demetria Sance	19.08.1977	180	80
5	Stacy Sykora	24.06.1977	175	61
8	Charlene Tagaloa	30.08.1973	178	71
9	Terri Zemaitis	28.04.1976	188		309	290
10	Mickisha Hurley	06.03.1975	183	66	317	305
11	Robin Ah Mow	15.09.1975	173	66	291	281
14	Jenna Wrobel		182
16	Sarah Noriega	24.04.1976	189	70	323	307
17	Danielle Scott	01.10.1972	188	83	325	302
18	Allison Weston	19.02.1974	183	77	309	295
