= Volleyball at the 1998 Asian Games =

- Venue: Impact Arena
- Dates: 7–15 December 1998
- Nations: 10

Volleyball was one of the 36 sports and disciplines which was held at the 1998 Asian Games in Bangkok, Thailand.

== Schedule ==
P	Preliminary round	C	Classification	½	Semifinals	F	Finals

Event↓/Date →	7th Mon	8th Tue	9th Wed	10th Thu	11th Fri	12th Sat	13th Sun	14th Mon	15th Tue
Men	P	P	P		P	P	½	C	F
Women	P	P	P		P		½	C	F

== Medalists ==
Event	Gold	Silver	Bronze
Men	China; Chen Fang; Chen Qi; An Jiajie; Li Tieming; Lu Weizhong; Wang Hebing; Zhang Liming; Zhang Xiang; Zhao Yong; Zheng Liang; Zhou Jianan; Zhu Gang	South Korea; Bang Ji-sub; Bang Sin-bong; Chang Byung-chul; Kim Kyoung-hoon; Kim Sang-woo; Kim Se-jin; Kim Sung-chae; Lee Ho; Lee Kyung-soo; Park Hee-sang; Park Sun-chool; Shin Jin-sik	Chinese Taipei; Chang En-chung; Cheng Chien-min; Cheng Hsiao-tsun; Chiang Wei-lin; Chiu Te-chuan; Li Chen-man; Lin Hung-nien; Lin Hsien-chen; Lin Yu-hao; Liu Yu-yi; Wu Chih-min; Wu Chung-cheng
Women	China; He Qi; Lai Yawen; Li Yan; Li Yizhi; Qiu Aihua; Sun Yue; Wang Lina; Wang Ziling; Wu Yongmei; Yin Yin; Zhang Jinwen; Zhu Yunying	South Korea; Chang So-yun; Chang Yoon-hee; Chung Sun-hye; Hong Ji-yeon; Jung Eun-sun; Kang Hye-mi; Kang Mee-sun; Kim Chang-hun; Ku Min-jung; Lee Meong-hee; Park Mee-kyung; Park Soo-jeong	Japan; Naomi Eto; Eriko Isobe; Chie Kanda; Chikako Kumamae; Hitomi Mitsunaga; Junko Moriyama; Ikumi Ogake; Minako Onuki; Miki Sasaki; Hiromi Suzuki; Asako Tajimi; Hiroko Tsukumo

== Medal table ==
Rank	Nation	Gold	Silver	Bronze	Total
1	China (CHN)	2	0	0	2
2	South Korea (KOR)	0	2	0	2
3	Chinese Taipei (TPE)	0	0	1	1
3	Japan (JPN)	0	0	1	1
Totals (4 entries)		2	2	2	6

== Draw ==
The teams were seeded based on their final ranking at the 1994 Asian Games.

=== Men ===
Pool A

- Thailand (Host)
- South Korea (3)
- Chinese Taipei
- Indonesia
- ~~Mongolia~~*
- Qatar

Pool B

- Japan (1)
- China (2)
- India
- ~~Iran~~*
- Kazakhstan
- Pakistan

=== Women ===
Pool A

- Thailand (Host)
- Japan (3)
- Kazakhstan
- ~~Mongolia~~*

Pool B

- South Korea (1)
- China (2)
- Chinese Taipei
- ~~North Korea~~*

* Withdrew.

== Final standing ==
=== Men ===
Rank	Team	Pld	W	L
1st place, gold medalist(s)	China	6	6	0
2nd place, silver medalist(s)	South Korea	6	5	1
3rd place, bronze medalist(s)	Chinese Taipei	6	4	2
4	Japan	6	3	3
5	Thailand	6	4	2
6	Indonesia	6	2	4
7	India	6	3	3
8	Kazakhstan	6	1	5
9	Pakistan	5	1	4
10	Qatar	5	0	5

=== Women ===
Rank	Team	Pld	W	L
1st place, gold medalist(s)	China	4	4	0
2nd place, silver medalist(s)	South Korea	4	2	2
3rd place, bronze medalist(s)	Japan	4	3	1
4	Thailand	4	1	3
5	Chinese Taipei	3	1	2
6	Kazakhstan	3	0	3
