= Srsen =

Srsen may refer to:

- Sršeň, a Czech and Slovak surname
- Sršen, a Croatian and Slovene surname
