= Ribičič =

Ribičič is a Slovenian surname. The Croatian form of the name is Ribičić. Notable people with the surname include:

- Ciril Ribičič, Slovenian jurist, politician and author
- Josip Ribičič (1886–1969), Slovenian writer
- Marijana Ribičić (born 1979), Croatian volleyball player
- Mitja Ribičič (1919–2013), Slovenian politician
