= Anna Ivanova =

Anna Ivanova may refer to:

- Anna Ivanova (volleyball, born 1978), Bulgarian volleyball player
- Anna Ivanova (volleyball, born 1987), Russian volleyball player
- Ana Ivanova, Paraguayan actress
