= Ana Fernández (volleyball) =

Cuban volleyball player (born 1973)

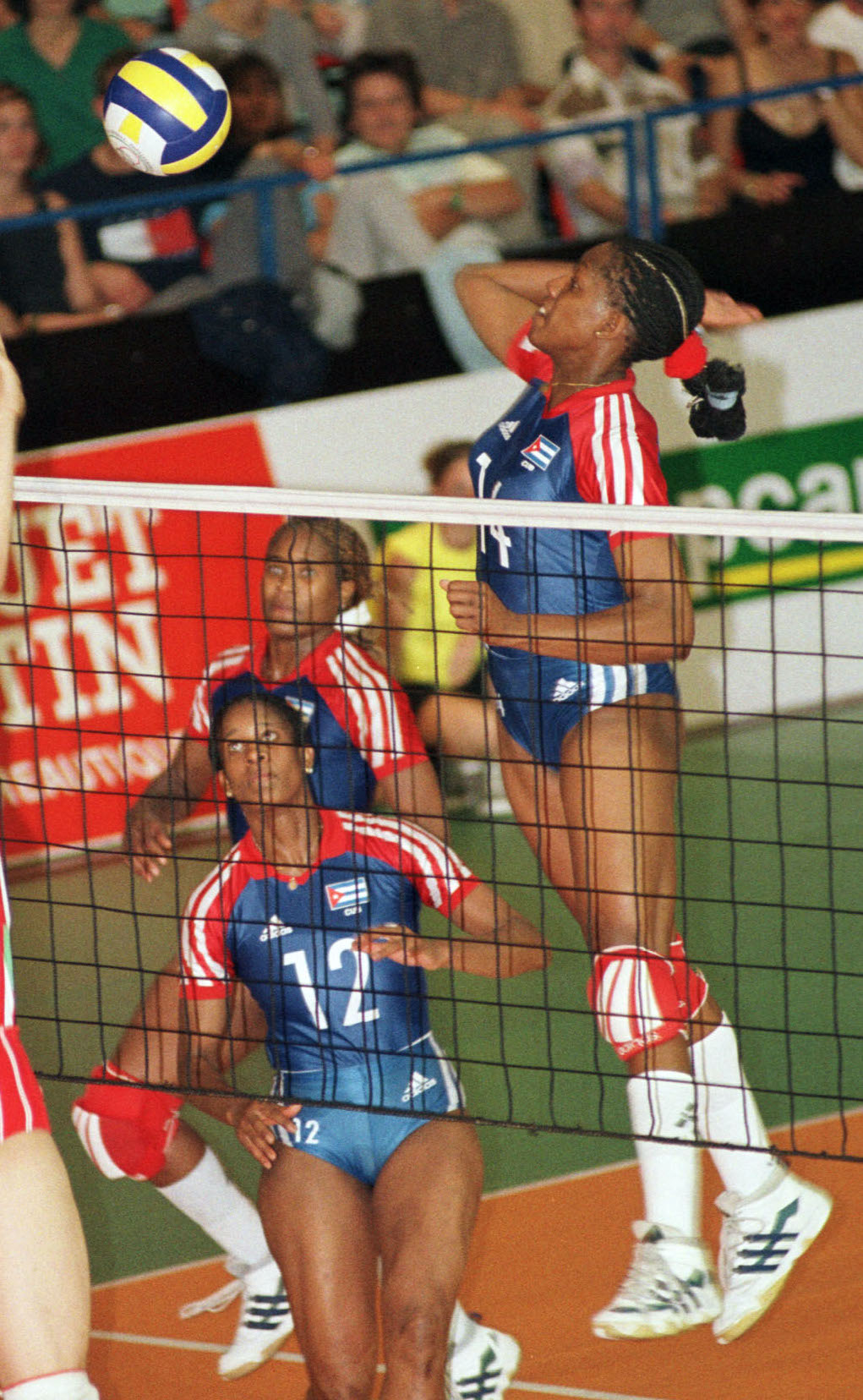

Personal information
- Full name: Ana Ibis Fernández Valle
- Born: 3 August 1973 (age 53); Sancti Spíritus, Cuba
- Height: 1.84 m (6 ft 0 in)

Volleyball information
- Position: Middle blocker
- Number: 14

National team
1992–2004	Cuba
Honours
Women's volleyball
Representing Cuba
Olympic Games
Gold medal – first place	1992 Barcelona	Team
Gold medal – first place	1996 Atlanta	Team
Gold medal – first place	2000 Sydney	Team
Bronze medal – third place	2004 Athens	Team
World Championship
Gold medal – first place	1994 Brazil	Team
Gold medal – first place	1998 Japan	Team
FIVB World Cup
Gold medal – first place	1995 Japan	Team
Gold medal – first place	1999 Japan	Team
FIVB World Grand Prix
Gold medal – first place	1993 Hong Kong
Silver medal – second place	1994 Shanghai
Silver medal – second place	1996 Shanghai
Silver medal – second place	1997 Kobe
Bronze medal – third place	1995 Shanghai
Bronze medal – third place	1998 Hong Kong
World Grand Champions Cup
Gold medal – first place	1993 Japan
Silver medal – second place	1997 Japan
Pan American Games
Gold medal – first place	1995 Mar del Plata	Team
Silver medal – second place	1999 Winnipeg	Team

Ana Ibis Fernández Valle (born 3 August 1973) is a Cuban former volleyball player who is a four-time Olympian and three-time Olympic gold medalist. She was a member of the Cuban national volleyball team that won a gold medal in the 1992, 1996, and 2000 Olympics. She also won a bronze medal in the 2004 Olympics.

Fernández was born in Sancti Spíritus. In addition to her Olympic medals, she won gold medals with the Cuban team in the 1994 and 1998 FIVB World Championship.

== Individual awards ==
- 1998 World Championship "Best Spiker"

Awards
Preceded by (Cuba) Mireya Luis (Russia) Elizaveta Tishchenko	Best Spiker of FIVB World Grand Prix; 1996; 2000	Succeeded by (Brazil) Ana Paula Connelly (Russia) Elizaveta Tishchenko
Preceded by (Cuba) Mireya Luis	Best Spiker of FIVB World Championship; 1998	Succeeded by (Russia) Elizaveta Tishchenko
