= Marta Sánchez (volleyball) =

Cuban volleyball player (born 1973)

Personal information
- Full name: Marta Sánchez Salfrán
- Born: 17 May 1973 (age 53); Holguín, Cuba
- Height: 1.78 m (5 ft 10 in)

Volleyball information
- Position: Outside hitter
- Number: 17

National team
1993–2004	Cuba
Honours
Women's volleyball
Representing Cuba
Olympic Games
Gold medal – first place	2000 Sidney	Team
Bronze medal – third place	2004 Athens	Team
World Championship
Gold medal – first place	1998 Japan	Team
FIVB World Cup
Gold medal – first place	1995 Japan	Team
Gold medal – first place	1999 Japan	Team
FIVB World Grand Prix
Bronze medal – third place	1995 Shanghai
Bronze medal – third place	1998 Hong Kong
World Grand Champions Cup
Gold medal – first place	1993 Japan
Silver medal – second place	1997 Japan
Pan American Games
Gold medal – first place	1995 Mar del Plata	Team
Silver medal – second place	1999 Winnipeg	Team
Silver medal – second place	2003 Santo Domingo	Team

Marta Sánchez Salfrán (born 17 May 1973) is a Cuban former volleyball player and two-time Olympian who helped Cuba win a gold medal at the 2000 Summer Olympics and a bronze medal at the 2004 Summer Olympics. She also won a gold medal at the 1995 Pan American Games and a silver medal at the 1999 and 2003 Pan American Games.
