= Lilia Izquierdo =

Cuban volleyball player

Personal information
- Full name: Lilia Izquierdo Aguirre
- Born: 10 February 1967 (age 59); Havana, Cuba
- Height: 1.73 m (5 ft 8 in)

Volleyball information
- Position: Setter
- Number: 4

National team
1986–2000	Cuba
Honours
Women's volleyball
Representing Cuba
Olympic Games
Gold medal – first place	1992 Barcelona	Team
Gold medal – first place	1996 Atlanta	Team
Gold medal – first place	2000 Sydney	Team
World Championship
Gold medal – first place	1994 Brazil	Team
Gold medal – first place	1998 Japan	Team
FIVB World Cup
Gold medal – first place	1989 Japan
Gold medal – first place	1991 Japan
Gold medal – first place	1995 Japan	Team
Gold medal – first place	1999 Japan	Team
FIVB World Grand Prix
Gold medal – first place	1993 Hong Kong
Silver medal – second place	1994 Shanghai
Silver medal – second place	1996 Shanghai
Silver medal – second place	1997 Kobe
Bronze medal – third place	1995 Shanghai
Bronze medal – third place	1998 Hong Kong
World Grand Champions Cup
Gold medal – first place	1993 Japan
Silver medal – second place	1997 Japan
Pan American Games
Gold medal – first place	1987 Indianapolis	Team
Gold medal – first place	1991 Havana	Team
Gold medal – first place	1995 Mar del Plata	Team
Silver medal – second place	1999 Winnipeg	Team
Central American and Caribbean Games
Gold medal – first place	1986 Santiago de los Caballeros	Team
Gold medal – first place	1990 Mexico City	Team
Gold medal – first place	1998 Maracaibo	Team

Lilia Izquierdo Aguirre (born 10 February 1967) is a Cuban retired female volleyball player and three-time Olympian. Izquierdo helped the Cuban women's national volleyball team win gold medals at the Summer Olympics in 1992, 1996, and 2000. She also helped the Cuban national team win gold medals at the 1994 and 1998 FIVB World Championship. Additionally, she won gold medals at the FIVB World Cup in 1989, 1991, 1995, and 1999. Izquierdo was a setter.

Awards
Preceded by (Cuba) Regla Torres	Best Server of FIVB World Grand Prix; 1994	Succeeded by (Brazil) Raquel Silva
