= Mitsunaga =

Mitsunaga (written: 光永 or 満永) is a Japanese surname. Notable people with the surname include:

- Hitomi Mitsunaga (満永 ひとみ, born 1976), Japanese volleyball player
- Yuya Mitsunaga (光永 祐也, born 1995), Japanese footballer
