= 2004 FIVB Women's World Olympic Qualification Tournament =

The 2004 FIVB Women's World Olympic Qualification Tournament was a women's volleyball tournament to determine which four teams would compete in the women's event at the 2004 Athens Olympics. It was held on 8–16 May 2004 in Tokyo, Japan. The winning teams were Japan, South Korea, Russia and Italy.

== Round robin ==
- Saturday May 8, 2004

Chinese Taipei	1–3	Puerto Rico	(23-25 21-25 25-21 21–25)
South Korea	3–1	Thailand	(24-26 25-14 25-16 25–8)
Russia	3–0	Nigeria	(25-10 25-10 25–7)
Italy	2–3	Japan	(18-25 25-23 18-25 25-20 13–15)

- Sunday May 9, 2004

South Korea	3–0	Chinese Taipei	(25-20 26-24 25–11)
Puerto Rico	0–3	Russia	(17-25 13-25 23–25)
Nigeria	0–3	Italy	(18-25 13-25 7-25)
Thailand	0–3	Japan	(10-25 14-25 20–25)

- Tuesday May 11, 2004

Chinese Taipei	0–3	Thailand	(21-25 23-25 20–25)
Russia	2–3	South Korea	(25-15 20-25 25-23 22-25 13–15)
Italy	3–0	Puerto Rico	(25-17 25-13 25–16)
Japan	3–0	Nigeria	(25-10 25-9 25–19)

- Wednesday May 12, 2004

South Korea	3–2	Italy	(17-25 10-25 25-17 25-18 18–16)
Thailand	3–0	Nigeria	(25-16 25-10 25–13)
Chinese Taipei	0–3	Russia	(10-25 14-25 17–25)
Puerto Rico	0–3	Japan	(23-25 11-25 23–25)

- Friday May 14, 2004

Nigeria	0–3	Puerto Rico	(17-25 18-25 16–25)
Russia	3–0	Thailand	(25-15 25-18 25–12)
Italy	3–0	Chinese Taipei	(25-15 25-19 25–16)
Japan	3–0	South Korea	(25-19 25-19 25–15)

- Saturday May 15, 2004

Thailand	3–0	Puerto Rico	(25-21 25-17 25–23)
Russia	2–3	Italy	(25-18 25-22 15-25 17-25 14–16)
South Korea	3–0	Nigeria	(25-17 25-14 25–13)
Chinese Taipei	1–3	Japan	(27-25 11-25 19-25 22–25)

- Sunday May 16, 2004

Puerto Rico	0–3	South Korea	(19-25 15-25 15–25)
Nigeria	0–3	Chinese Taipei	(18-25 23-25 21–25)
Italy	3–0	Thailand	(25-16 25-14 25–14)
Japan	0–3	Russia	(20-25 18-25 19–25)

== Final ranking ==
Rk	Team	Points	Won	Lost	SW	SL	Ratio	PW	PL	Ratio
1	Japan	13	6	1	18	6	3.000	565	445	1.270
2	South Korea	13	6	1	18	8	2.250	576	493	1.168
3	Russia	12	5	2	19	6	3.167	576	432	1.333
4	Italy	12	5	2	19	8	2.375	606	477	1.270
5	Thailand	10	3	4	10	12	0.833	422	488	0.865
6	Puerto Rico	9	2	5	6	16	0.375	437	516	0.847
7	Chinese Taipei	8	1	6	5	18	0.278	454	559	0.812
8	Nigeria	7	0	7	0	21	0.000	299	525	0.570

- South Korea is counted as The Asian Continental Qualification Tournament Champion since it is the best Asian team except the winner.

== Awards ==
- Best scorer:
  - Ekaterina Gamova (RUS)
- Best spiker:
  - Miyuki Takahashi (JPN)
- Best blocker:
  - Ekaterina Gamova (RUS)
- Best server:
  - Ekaterina Gamova (RUS)
- Best receiver:
  - Ikumi Narita (JPN)
- Best setter:
  - Yoshie Takeshita (JPN)
- Best digger:
  - Ikumi Narita (JPN)
