= Wang Lina (volleyball) =

Chinese volleyball player

Personal information
- Full name: Wang Lina
- Nickname: Giant Bird (大鳥)
- Born: 5 February 1978 (age 48) Heilongjiang, China
- Home town: Hei Longjiang, China
- Height: 1.81 m (5 ft 11 in)
- Weight: 75 kg (165 lb)
- Spike: 319 cm (126 in)
- Block: 300 cm (120 in)

Volleyball information
- Position: Outside hitter
- Number: 13 (1996); 15 (1998–2004)

National team
- Years: Team
- 1996–2000 2003–2004: China
Honours
Women's volleyball
Representing China
Olympic Games
Gold medal – first place	2004 Athens	Team
Silver medal – second place	1996 Atlanta	Team
World Championship
Silver medal – second place	1998 Japan	Team
FIVB World Cup
Gold medal – first place	2003 Japan
FIVB World Grand Prix
Gold medal – first place	2003 Andria
Bronze medal – third place	1999 Yuxi
Asian Games
Gold medal – first place	1998 Bangkok	Team
Asian Championship
Gold medal – first place	1997 Doha
Gold medal – first place	1999 Tehran
Gold medal – first place	2003 Tianjin
- Updated on Dec 2010

Wang Lina (simplified Chinese: 王丽娜; traditional Chinese: 王麗娜; pinyin: wáng lì nà; born 5 February 1978) is a former China women's national volleyball team outside hitter. She won the 2003 World Cup and 2004 Olympics gold medal.

== Clubs ==
- (China) Bayi (Army)(1995–2008)
- (China) Guangzhou Jianlong (2009–2010)
- (China) Guangdong Evergrande (2011–2012)
