= Ângela Moraes =

Brazilian volleyball player (born 1979)

Personal information
- Nationality: Brazilian
- Born: 15 October 1972 (age 54)
- Home town: Rio de Janeiro
- Height: 1.81 m (5 ft 11 in)
- Weight: 69 kg (152 lb)
- Spike: 311 cm (122 in)
- Block: 298 cm (117 in)

Volleyball information
- Position: Middle blocker
- Number: 1 (national team)

National team
- Years: Team
- 1995-2002: Brazil
Honours
Women's volleyball
Representing Brazil
World Grand Champions Cup
Bronze medal – third place	1997 Japan	Team

Ângela Moraes (born 15 October 1972) is a Brazilian former volleyball player, who played as a middle blocker.

Moraes was part of the Brazil women's national volleyball team at the 1999 FIVB Volleyball Women's World Cup, 2002 FIVB Volleyball Women's World Championship in Germany.

On club level she played with Minas Tênis Clube.

== Clubs ==
Club	From	To
Brazil Minas Tênis Clube
