= Wang Ziling =

Chinese volleyball player

Personal information
- Born: 14 February 1972 (age 54) Zhangzhou, Fujian, China
- Height: 182 cm (6 ft 0 in)

Volleyball information
- Position: Middle blocker
- Number: 10

National team
- Years: Team
- 1994–1998: China
Honours
Women's volleyball
Representing China
Olympic Games
Silver medal – second place	1996 Atlanta	Team
World Championship
Silver medal – second place	1998 Japan	Team
FIVB World Cup
Bronze medal – third place	1995 Japan	Team
Asian Games
Gold medal – first place	1998 Bangkok	Team
Silver medal – second place	1994 Hiroshima	Team

Wang Ziling (Chinese: 王子凌; pinyin: Wáng Zǐlíng, born 14 February 1972) is a Chinese former volleyball player who competed in the 1996 Summer Olympics in Atlanta. She won a silver medal with the Chinese team at the 1998 FIVB World Championship in Japan.
