= Li Yan (volleyball) =

Chinese volleyball player (born 1976)

Personal information
- Born: 1 May 1976 (age 50); Fuzhou, Fujian, China
- Height: 178 cm (5 ft 10 in)

Volleyball information
- Position: Libero
- Number: 2

National team
1994–2004	China
Honours
Women's volleyball
Representing China
Olympic Games
Silver medal – second place	1996 Atlanta	Team
World Championship
Silver medal – second place	1998 Japan	Team
FIVB World Cup
Bronze medal – third place	1995 Japan	Team
FIVB World Grand Prix
Bronze medal – third place	1999 Yu Xi
Asian Games
Gold medal – first place	1998 Bangkok	Team
Silver medal – second place	1994 Hiroshima	Team

Li Yan (Chinese: 李艳; pinyin: Lǐ Yàn, born 1 May 1976) is a retired Chinese former volleyball player who won a silver medal at the 1996 Summer Olympics in Atlanta and competed at the 2000 Summer Olympics in Sydney.

Awards
Preceded by (Brazil) Marcia Cunha	Best Blocker of FIVB World Grand Prix; 1996	Succeeded by (Brazil) Ana Paula Connelly
