= Sršen =

Sršen is a South Slavic surname found in Croatia and Slovenia.

It is one of the most common surnames in the Dubrovnik-Neretva County of Croatia.

It may refer to:

- Adalita Srsen (born 1971), Australian singer of Croatian descent
- Ana Sršen (born 1973), Croatian swimmer
- Eva Sršen (born 1951), Slovenian singer
- Vanesa Sršen (born 1971), Croatian volleyball player
