= Li Yizhi =

Chinese volleyball player

Personal information
- Nationality: Chinese
- Born: 11 January 1977 (age 49)
- Height: 179 cm (5 ft 10 in)
- Spike: 312 cm (123 in)
- Block: 306 cm (120 in)

Volleyball information
- Position: Middle blocker
- Number: 9

National team
1994–1999	China
Honours
Women's volleyball
Representing China
World Championship
Silver medal – second place	1998 Japan	Team
FIVB World Grand Prix
Bronze medal – third place	1999 Yu Xi
Asian Games
Gold medal – first place	1998 Bangkok	Team

Li Yizhi (born 11 January 1977) is a retired Chinese female volleyball player. She was part of the China women's national volleyball team.

She competed at the 1998 FIVB World Championship in Japan, where she won a silver medal.
