= Liana Mesa =

Cuban volleyball player (born 1977)

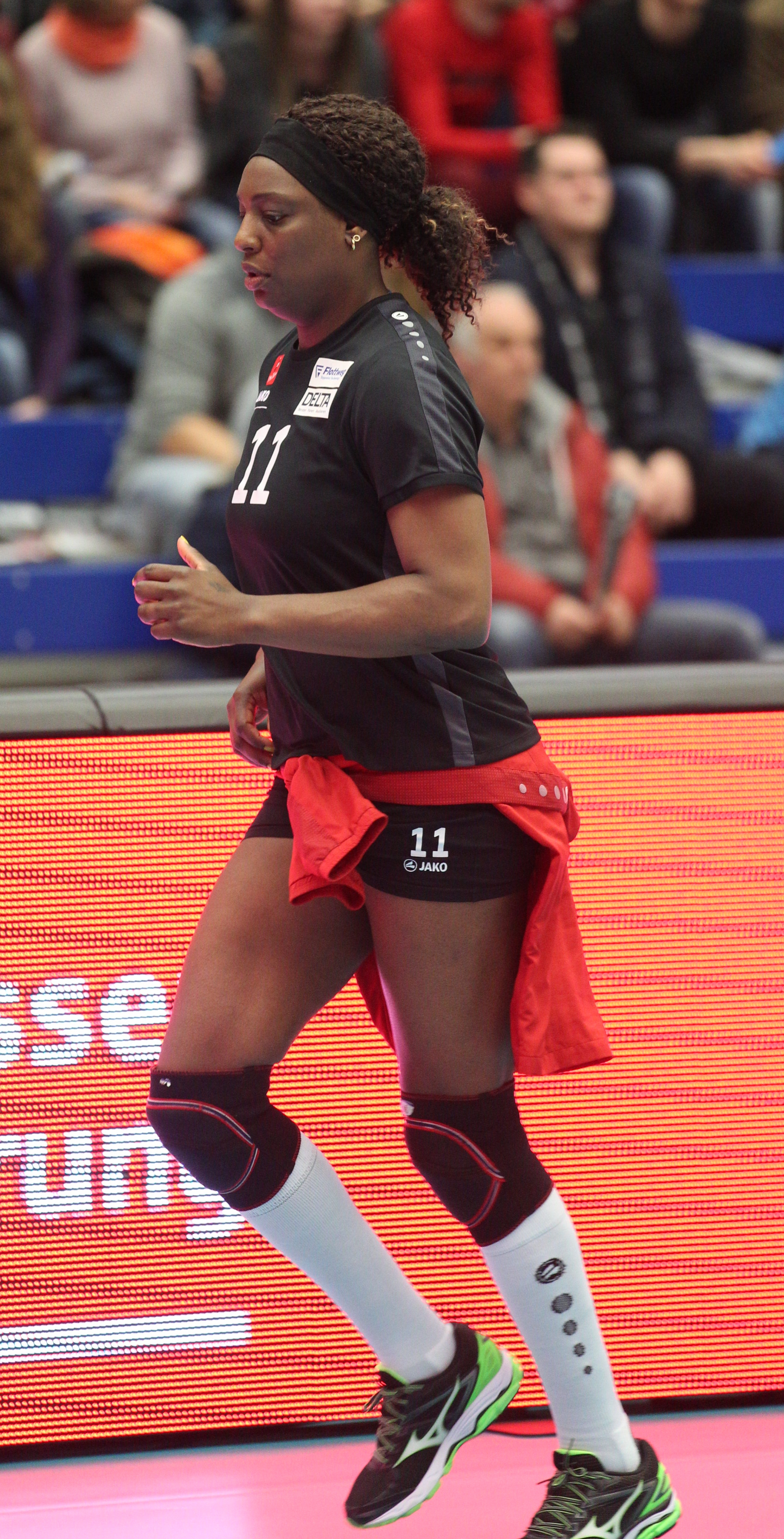
- Liana Mesa Luaces (2017)

Personal information
- Full name: Liana Mesa Luaces
- Born: 26 December 1977 (age 48); Camagüey, Cuba
- Height: 1.79 m (5 ft 10 in)
- Spike: 318 cm (125 in)
- Block: 307 cm (121 in)

Volleyball information
- Position: Libero
- Number: 11
Honours
Women's volleyball
Representing Cuba
Olympic Games
Bronze medal – third place	2004 Athens	Team
World Championship
Gold medal – first place	1998 Japan	Team
FIVB World Cup
Gold medal – first place	1999 Japan	Team
FIVB World Grand Prix
Silver medal – second place	2008 Yokohama
Bronze medal – third place	1998 Hong Kong
Pan American Games
Gold medal – first place	2007 Rio de Janeiro	Team
Silver medal – second place	2003 Santo Domingo	Team
Pan-American Cup
Gold medal – first place	2007 Colima
Central American and Caribbean Games
Silver medal – second place	2006 Cartagena	Team

Liana Mesa Luaces (born 26 December 1977) is a former volleyball player from Cuba who played with the Cuban women's national volleyball team at the 2004 Summer Olympics in Athens, where she won the bronze medal.

== Club volleyball ==
Liana signed for volleyball club "Red Star" of Belgrade, on 2 February 2009. She played as a libero.

== Clubs ==
- (Serbia) Crvena zvezda (2009–2010)
