= He Qi (volleyball) =

Chinese volleyball player (born 1973)

Personal information
- Born: 24 August 1973 (age 53); Shanghai, People's Republic of China
- Height: 178 cm (5 ft 10 in)

Volleyball information
- Position: Setter
- Number: 7

National team
1995–2000	China
Honours
Women's volleyball
Representing China
Olympic Games
Silver medal – second place	1996 Atlanta	Team
World Championship
Silver medal – second place	1998 Japan	Team
FIVB World Cup
Bronze medal – third place	1995 Japan	Team
FIVB World Grand Prix
Bronze medal – third place	1999 Yu Xi
Asian Games
Gold medal – first place	1998 Bangkok	Team

He Qi (Chinese: 何琦; pinyin: Hé Qí, born 24 August 1973) is a Chinese former volleyball player who competed in the 1996 Summer Olympics in Atlanta and in the 2000 Summer Olympics in Sydney. She is from Yunnan.
