= Berenice Restituyo =

Dominican Republic volleyball player (born 1977)

Personal information
- Nationality: Dominican
- Born: 11 May 1977 (age 49)
- Height: 184 cm (6 ft 0 in)
- Spike: 299 cm (118 in)
- Block: 291 cm (115 in)

Volleyball information
- Number: 6 (national team)

National team
1998	Dominican Republic

Berenice Restituyo (born 11 May 1977) is a retired Dominican Republic female volleyball player.

She was part of the Dominican Republic women's national volleyball team at the 1998 FIVB Volleyball Women's World Championship in Japan.
