= Yin Yin =

Chinese volleyball player

Personal information
- Full name: Yin Yin
- Nationality: Chinese
- Born: 2 January 1974 (age 52) Zhejiang, China
- Home town: Zhejiang, China
- Height: 1.87 m (6 ft 2 in)
- Weight: 71 kg (157 lb)
- Spike: 308 cm (121 in)
- Block: 305 cm (120 in)

Volleyball information
- Position: Outside hitter
- Number: 12

National team
- Years: Team
- 1994–2000: China
Honours
Women's volleyball
Representing China
World Championship
| Silver medal – second place | 1998 Japan | Team |
FIVB World Cup
| Bronze medal – third place | 1995 Japan | Team |
FIVB World Grand Prix
| Bronze medal – third place | 1994 Shanghai |
| Bronze medal – third place | 1999 Yuxi |
Asian Games
| Gold medal – first place | 1998 Bangkok | Team |
Asian Championship
| Gold medal – first place | 1995 Chiang Mai |
| Gold medal – first place | 1997 Manila |
| Gold medal – first place | 1999 Hong Kong |

Yin Yin (Chinese: 殷茵; born 2 January 1974, in Zhejiang) is a Chinese former volleyball player who played for the Chinese women's national volleyball team. She won a silver medal at the 1998 FIVB World Championship in Japan.

== Clubs ==
- (China) Zhejiang (1996-2001)
- (Italy) Edison Modena (2001–2002)
- (China) Zhejiang (2002-2003)
- (Italy) Icot Tec Europa Systems Forlì (2003-2004)
- (China) Zhejiang (2004-2005)
- (China) Guangdong Evergrande (2009–2010)

== Awards ==
=== Clubs ===
- 1996-1997 Chinese League A — Bronze Medal, with Zhejiang
- 1997-1998 Chinese League A — Bronze Medal, with Zhejiang
- 1998-1999 Chinese League A — Runner-Up, with
- 2001-2002 CEV Cup — Champion, with Edison Volley Modena
- Italian Cup — Champion, with Edison Volley Modena
- 2004-2005 Chinese League A — Bronze Medal, with Zhejiang
- 2009-2010 Chinese League B — Champion, with Guangdong Evergrande
