= Likhit Namsen =

Thai volleyball player (born 1972)

Personal information
- Nationality: Thailand
- Born: 6 July 1972 (age 54)
- Height: 1.72 m (5 ft 8 in)
- Spike: 280 cm (110 in)
- Block: 270 cm (106 in)

Volleyball information
- Position: Middle Blocker

National team
1990-1999	Thailand

Likhit Namsen (Thai: ลิขิต นามเสน, born 6 July 1972) is a retired Thai female volleyball player.

She was part of the Thailand women's national volleyball team at the 1998 FIVB Volleyball Women's World Championship in Japan.
