= Esther Cheboo =

Kenyan volleyball player (born 1968)

Personal information
- Nationality: Kenyan
- Born: 6 June 1968 (age 58)
- Height: 182 cm (6 ft 0 in)
- Spike: 295 cm (116 in)
- Block: 290 cm (114 in)

Volleyball information
- Number: 12 (national team)

National team
1998	Kenya

Esther Cheboo (born 6 June 1968) is a retired Kenyan female volleyball player.

She was part of the Kenya women's national volleyball team at the 1998 FIVB Volleyball Women's World Championship in Japan.
