= Suzanne Luttikhuis =

Dutch volleyball player (born 1977)

Personal information
- Nationality: Dutch
- Born: 25 July 1977 (age 49)
- Height: 191 cm (6 ft 3 in)
- Spike: 310 cm (122 in)
- Block: 298 cm (117 in)

Volleyball information
- Number: 6 (national team)

National team
1998	Netherlands

Suzanne Luttikhuis (born 25 July 1977) is a retired Dutch female volleyball player. She was part of the Netherlands women's national volleyball team.

She participated at the 1997 FIVB Volleyball World Grand Prix, and at the 1998 FIVB Volleyball Women's World Championship in Japan.
