= Dessislava Velitchkova =

Bulgarian volleyball player (born 1972)

Personal information
- Nationality: Bulgarian
- Born: 22 December 1972 (age 53)
- Height: 173 cm (5 ft 8 in)
- Spike: 50 cm (20 in)
- Block: 97 cm (38 in)

National team
Bulgaria

Dessislava Velitchkova (Bulgarian: Десислава Величкова - Деса) (born 22 December 1972) is a retired Bulgarian female volleyball player.

She was part of the Bulgaria women's national volleyball team at the 1998 FIVB Volleyball Women's World Championship in Japan.
