= Qiu Aihua =

Chinese volleyball player (born 1977)

Personal information
- Born: 28 January 1977 (age 49); Nantong, Jiangsu, China
- Height: 182 cm (6 ft 0 in)

Volleyball information
- Position: Opposite
- Number: 12

National team
1994–2000	China
Honours
Women's volleyball
Representing China
World Championship
Silver medal – second place	1998 Japan	Team
Asian Games
Gold medal – first place	1998 Bangkok	Team

Qiu Aihua (simplified Chinese: 邱爱华; traditional Chinese: 邱愛華, born 28 January 1977) is a Chinese former volleyball player who competed in the 2000 Summer Olympics in Sydney.
