= Kara Milling =

American volleyball player (born 1976)

Personal information
- Nationality: American
- Born: September 22, 1976 (age 50)
- Height: 6 ft 0 in (182 cm)
- Spike: 125 in (318 cm)
- Block: 117 in (297 cm)

Volleyball information
- Number: 4 (national team)

National team
1998	United States

Kara Milling (born September 22, 1976) is a retired American female volleyball player. She was part of the United States women's national volleyball team at the 1998 FIVB Volleyball Women's World Championship in Japan.
