= Sahara Castillo =

Peruvian volleyball player (born 1982)

Personal information
- Nationality: Peruvian
- Born: 16 July 1987 (age 39)
- Height: 176 cm (5 ft 9 in)
- Spike: 295 cm (116 in)
- Block: 285 cm (112 in)

National team
1998	Peru

Sahara Castillo (born 16 July 1983) is a retired Peruvian female volleyball player. She was part of the Peru women's national volleyball team at the 1998 FIVB Volleyball Women's World Championship in Japan.
