= Nantakan Petchplay =

Thai volleyball player (born 1977)

Personal information
- Nationality: Thailand
- Born: 21 March 1977 (age 49)
- Height: 1.74 cm (1 in)
- Spike: 280 cm (110 in)
- Block: 270 cm (106 in)

Volleyball information
- Position: Opposite Hitter

National team
1993-2001	Thailand

Nantakarn Petchplai (Thai: นันทกานต์ เพชรพลาย, RTGS: Nanthakan Petphlai; born 21 March 1977) is a retired Thai female volleyball player.

She was part of the Thailand women's national volleyball team at the 1998 FIVB Volleyball Women's World Championship in Japan.
