= Valerie Sterk =

American volleyball player (born 1975)

Personal information
- Nationality: American
- Born: December 4, 1975 (age 50)
- Height: 6 ft 2 in (188 cm)
- Spike: 122 in (309 cm)
- Block: 116 in (295 cm)

Volleyball information
- Number: 12 (national team)

National team
- Years: Team
- 1998: United States

Valerie Sterk Kemper (born December 4, 1975) is a retired American female volleyball player. She was part of the United States women's national volleyball team at the 1998 FIVB Volleyball Women's World Championship in Japan.
