= Eriko Isobe =

Japanese volleyball player (born 1977)

Personal information
- Nationality: Japanese
- Born: 23 August 1977 (age 49)
- Height: 1.68 m (5 ft 6 in)
- Spike: 2.80 m (110 in)
- Block: 2.71 m (107 in)

Volleyball information
- Position: Setter
- Number: 18 (national team)

National team
1998	Japan
Honours
Women's volleyball
Representing Japan
Asian Games
Bronze medal – third place	1998 Bangkok	Team

Eriko Isobe (born 23 August 1977) is a retired Japanese female volleyball player.

Isobe was part of the Japan women's national volleyball team at the 1998 FIVB World Championship in Japan.
