= Zhu Yunying =

Chinese volleyball player (born 1978)

Personal information
- Born: 15 January 1978 (age 48) Shanghai, Shanghai, China
- Height: 183 cm (6 ft 0 in)

Volleyball information
- Position: Setter
- Number: 4

National team
- Years: Team
- 1995–2000: China
Honours
Women's volleyball
Representing China
Olympic Games
Silver medal – second place	1996 Atlanta	Team
World Championship
Silver medal – second place	1998 Japan	Team
FIVB World Cup
Bronze medal – third place	1995 Japan	Team
FIVB World Grand Prix
Bronze medal – third place	1999 Yu Xi
Asian Games
Gold medal – first place	1998 Bangkok	Team

Zhu Yunying (simplified Chinese: 诸韵颖; traditional Chinese: 諸韻穎; pinyin: Zhū Yùnyǐng, born 15 January 1978) is a Chinese former volleyball player who competed as a backup setter at the 1996 Summer Olympics in Atlanta and the 2000 Summer Olympics in Sydney.
