= Karrie Downey =

American volleyball player and coach

Personal information
- Nationality: American
- Born: May 30, 1973 (age 53)
- Height: 5 ft 10 in (178 cm)
- Spike: 120 in (304 cm)
- Block: 115 in (292 cm)

Volleyball information
- Number: 14 (national team)

National team
1998	United States

Karrie Downey Larson (born May 30, 1973) is an American female volleyball player, and coach.

She was part of the United States women's national volleyball team at the 1998 FIVB Volleyball Women's World Championship in Japan.
