= Anna Paijinda =

Thai volleyball player (born 1974)

Personal information
- Nationality: Thailand
- Born: 3 April 1974 (age 52)
- Height: 1.75 m (5 ft 9 in)
- Spike: 285 cm (112 in)
- Block: 280 cm (110 in)

Volleyball information
- Position: Wing-spiker

National team
1993–2002	Thailand
Honours
Southeast Asian Games
Silver medal – second place	1993 Singapore	Team

Anna Paijinda (Thai: แอนณา ไภยจินดา, born 3 April 1974) is a retired Thai volleyball player. She was part of the Thailand women's national volleyball team.

She participated at the 1998 FIVB Volleyball Women's World Championship in Japan, and also at the 2002 FIVB Volleyball Women's World Championship.
