= Vanya Sokolova =

Bulgarian volleyball player (born 1971)

Personal information
- Full name: Vania Sokolova
- Nickname: Vania
- Born: June 22, 1971 Bulgaria
- Height: 1.89 m (6 ft 2 in)
- Weight: 76 kg (168 lb)
- Spike: 306 cm (120 in)
- Block: 301 cm (119 in)

Volleyball information
- Position: middle blocker / opposite hitter
Honours
Women's volleyball
Representing Bulgaria
European Championships
Bronze medal – third place	2001 Varna	Team competition

Vanya Sokolova resp. Vania Sokolova (Bulgarian: Ваня Соколова) (born 22 June 1971) is a former Bulgarian volleyball player and captain of the Bulgarian national squad. She is assistant coach for the Bulgarian U20 national team.

== Career ==
In her long career she player in Bulgaria, Romania, Germany, Austria and Italian A1 and A2 league. Among others she won the German championship with Schweriner SC and helped the team of Megius Padova to ascend from A2 to A1 as a leading player.

In 2005/06 she was best scorer of the season and was awarded best player in Italian A2. With the national team her biggest successes were bronze at the Women's European Volleyball Championship in 2001, and at the World Championship 2002.

Playing middle blocker Sokolova changed to the opposite hitter position in Italy. Though being a variable attacker Sokolova is also strong in defence. As a middle blocker she was not replaced by a libero in the back row in Bulgarian national team.

Sokolova played her last seasons for Apollon LIMASSOL in Cyprus with some other former Bulgarian national players participating on international level in the CEV Challenge Cup. She retired in 2012.
