= Bhudsabun Prasaengkaew =

Thai volleyball player (born 1972)

Personal information
- Nationality: Thailand
- Born: 23 March 1972 (age 54)
- Height: 168 cm (5 ft 6 in)
- Spike: 275 cm (108 in)
- Block: 265 cm (104 in)

Volleyball information
- Position: Libero
- Number: 9

National team
1989–1999	Thailand

Bhudsabun Prasaengkaew (Thai: บุษบรรณ พระแสงแก้ว, RTGS: Butsaban Phrasaengkaeo; born 23 March 1972) is a retired Thai female volleyball player.

She was part of the Thailand women's national volleyball team at the 1998 FIVB Volleyball Women's World Championship in Japan.

== Club ==
- Aero Thai Thailand (2004–2005)
