= Saranya Srisakorn =

Thai volleyball player (born 1975)

Personal information
- Nationality: Thailand
- Born: 11 May 1975 (age 51)
- Height: 174 cm (5 ft 9 in)
- Spike: 280 cm (110 in)
- Block: 270 cm (106 in)

Volleyball information
- Position: Middle Blocker

National team
1993 - 2002	Thailand

Saranya Srisakorn (Thai: ศรัณยา ศรีสาคร, born 11 May 1975) is a retired Thai female volleyball player.

She was part of the Thailand women's national volleyball team at the 1998 FIVB Volleyball Women's World Championship in Japan, and also at the 2002 FIVB Volleyball Women's World Championship.
