= Elisa Galastri =

Italian volleyball player (born 1978)

Personal information
- Nationality: Italian
- Born: 21 August 1978 (age 48)
- Height: 183 cm (6 ft 0 in)
- Spike: 307 cm (121 in)
- Block: 292 cm (115 in)

Volleyball information
- Number: 9 (national team)

Career
Teams
| | Volley Bergamo |

National team
| 1998 | Italy |

Elisa Galastri (born 21 August 1978) is a retired Italian volleyball player.

She was part of the Italy women's national volleyball team at the 1998 FIVB Volleyball Women's World Championship in Japan. She played with Volley Bergamo.
