= Teodora Betcheva =

Bulgarian volleyball player (born 1971)

Personal information
- Nationality: Bulgarian
- Born: 19 March 1971 (age 55)
- Height: 180 cm (5 ft 11 in)
- Spike: 292 cm (115 in)
- Block: 290 cm (114 in)

Volleyball information
- Number: 9 (national team)

National team
1998	Bulgaria

Teodora Betcheva (Bulgarian: Теодора Бечева, born 19 March 1971) is a retired Bulgarian female volleyball player.

She was part of the Bulgaria women's national volleyball team at the 1998 FIVB Volleyball Women's World Championship in Japan.
