= Wu Yongmei =

Chinese volleyball player

Personal information
- Born: 1 January 1975 (age 51)
- Height: 186 cm (6 ft 1 in)

Volleyball information
- Position: Middle blocker
- Number: 5

National team
- Years: Team
- 1993–2002: China
Honours
Women's volleyball
Representing China
Olympic Games
Silver medal – second place	1996 Atlanta	Team
World Championship
Silver medal – second place	1998 Japan	Team
FIVB World Cup
Bronze medal – third place	1995 Japan	Team
FIVB World Grand Prix
Silver medal – second place	1993 Hong Kong
Silver medal – second place	2001 Macau
Silver medal – second place	2002 Hong Kong
Bronze medal – third place	1999 Yu Xi
Asian Games
Gold medal – first place	1998 Bangkok	Team

Wu Yongmei (Chinese: 吴咏梅; pinyin: Wú Yǒngméi, born 1 January 1975) is a Chinese former volleyball player who competed in the 1996 Summer Olympics in Atlanta, where she won a silver medal, and in the 2000 Summer Olympics in Sydney.
