= Dessislava Nikodimova =

Bulgarian volleyball player (born 1966)

Personal information
- Nationality: Bulgarian
- Born: 23 June 1966 (age 60)
- Height: 186 cm (6 ft 1 in)
- Spike: 294 cm (116 in)
- Block: 291 cm (115 in)

Volleyball information
- Number: 10 (national team)

National team
| 1998 | Bulgaria |

Dessislava Nikodimova (Bulgarian: Десислава Никодимова; born 23 June 1966) is a retired Bulgarian female volleyball player.

She was part of the Bulgaria women's national volleyball team at the 1998 FIVB Volleyball Women's World Championship in Japan.
