= Laddawan Srisakorn =

Thai volleyball player (born 1975)

Personal information
- Nationality: Thailand
- Born: 11 May 1975 (age 51)
- Height: 174 cm (5 ft 9 in)
- Spike: 280 cm (110 in)
- Block: 275 cm (108 in)

Volleyball information
- Position: Middle Blocker

National team
1993-1999	Thailand

Laddawan Srisakorn (Thai: ลัดดาวัลย์ ศรีสาคร, RTGS: Latdawan Sisakon; born 11 May 1975) is a retired Thai female volleyball player.

She was part of the Thailand women's national volleyball team at the 1998 FIVB Volleyball Women's World Championship in Japan.
