= Wisuta Heebkaew =

Thai volleyball player (born 1980)

Personal information
- Nationality: Thailand
- Born: 1 February 1980 (age 46)
- Height: 1.75 m (5 ft 9 in)
- Spike: 280 cm (110 in)
- Block: 270 cm (106 in)

Volleyball information
- Position: Setter

National team
- Years: Team
- 1997-2002: Thailand

Wisuta Heebkaew (Thai: วิสุตา หีบแก้ว, born 1 February 1980) is a retired Thai female volleyball player.

She was part of the Thailand women's national volleyball team at the 1998 FIVB Volleyball Women's World Championship in Japan, and also at the 2002 FIVB Volleyball Women's World Championship.
