= Emilia Pashova =

Bulgarian volleyball player (born 1966)

Personal information
- Nationality: Bulgarian
- Born: 23 September 1966 (age 60)
- Height: 187 cm (6 ft 2 in)
- Spike: 302 cm (119 in)
- Block: 295 cm (116 in)

Volleyball information
- Number: 11 (national team)

National team
1998	Bulgaria

Emilia Pashova (Bulgarian: Емилия Пашова) (born 23 September 1966) is a retired Bulgarian female volleyball player.

She was part of the Bulgaria women's national volleyball team at the 1998 FIVB Volleyball Women's World Championship in Japan.
