= Iliana Petkova =

Bulgarian volleyball player (born 1977)

Iliyana Petkova
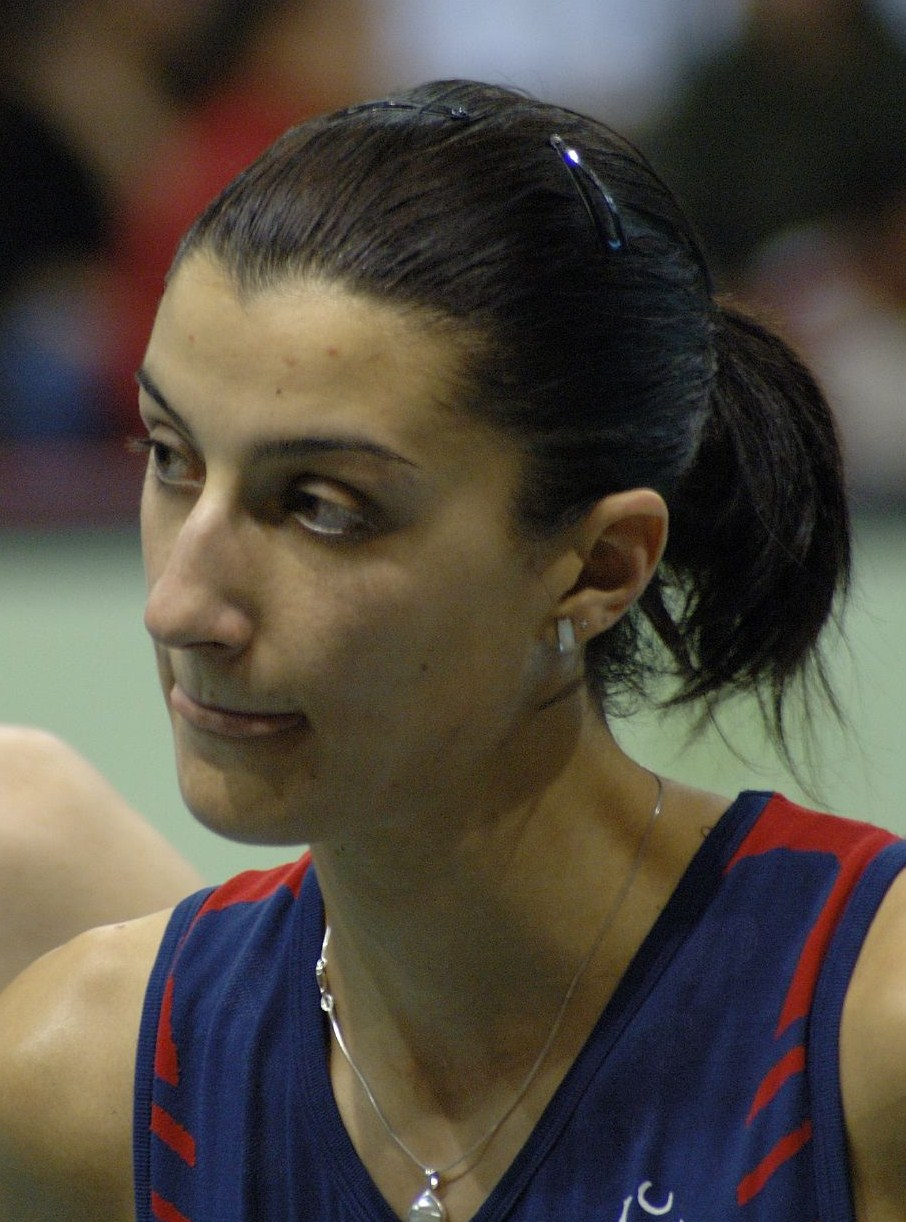
- Petkova in 2006

Personal information
- Nationality: Bulgaria
- Born: 10 November 1977 (age 48)
- Height: 1.90 m (6 ft 3 in)
- Weight: 72 kg (159 lb)
- Spike: 305 cm (120 in)
- Block: 298 cm (117 in)

Iliana Petkova (born 10 November 1977), is a former Bulgarian volleyball player.

She participated at the 2002 FIVB Volleyball Women's World Championship in Germany.

== Career ==
Iliyana Petkova started her volleyball career in Bulgaria, even though her professional debut took place in 1998 in France with Racing Club Villebon 91. In 1999, she moved to the Racing Club de France in France, then moved to Austria in the Vienna Post, with which she won the Austrian championship.

In the 2001–02 season, she made her debut in the Italian A1 series among the files of Virtus Reggio Calabria Volleyball. Next season she began with Giannino Pieralisi Volley, where she played for five seasons. In 2007, she moved to Volley 2002 Forlì, while in 2008 she was hired by Florens Volley Castellana Grotte.

In the 2009–10 season, she moved to Russia, in the Volejbol'nyj klub Samorodok; In 2010–2011, she was hired by Azərreyl Voleybol Klubu, with whom she won the Challenge Cup. After being left without team, in mid-season 2011–12, she returned to Italy to play in Volleyball Villanterio di Pavia. The following season, she returned to play in Russia in Leningradka Saint Petersburg, participating in the junior series, the Soviet Top League A. For the 2015–16 season, she was once again in Italy, hired by Golem Volley of Palmi, newly promoted to Serie A2.

Iliyana Petkova is a member of the Bulgarian national team with whom in 2001 she won bronze at the European Championship and 2009 won bronze at the European League.
