= Malinee Kongtan =

Thai volleyball player (born 1973)

Personal information
- Nationality: Thailand
- Born: 9 November 1973 (age 52)
- Height: 1.80 m (5 ft 11 in)
- Spike: 280 cm (110 in)
- Block: 270 cm (106 in)

Volleyball information
- Position: Middle Blocker

National team
1990-1999	Thailand

Malinee Kongtan (Thai: มาลินี คงทัน, RTGS: Malini Khongthan; born 9 November 1973) is a retired Thai female volleyball player.

She was part of the Thailand women's national volleyball team at the 1998 FIVB Volleyball Women's World Championship in Japan.
