= Iliyana Gocheva =

Bulgarian volleyball player (born 1976)

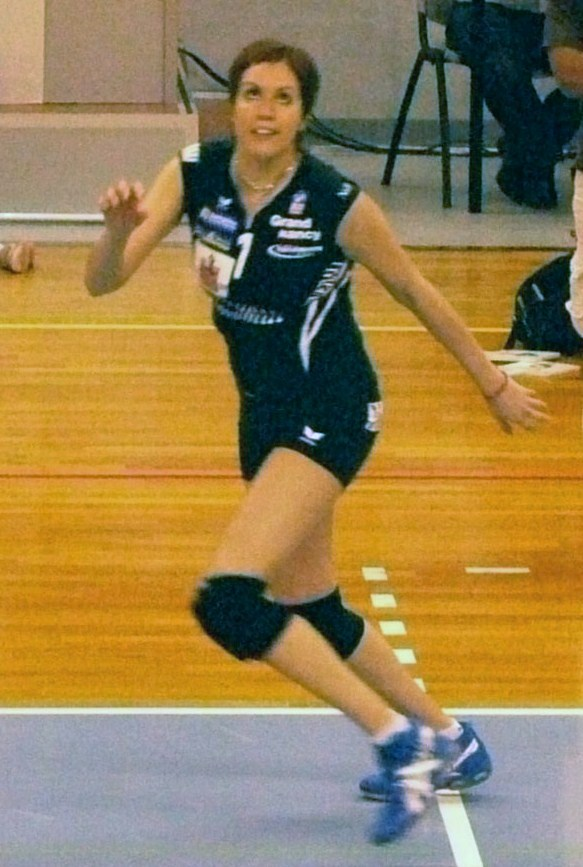

Personal information
- Born: 11 February 1976 (age 50); Bulgaria
- Height: 188 cm (6 ft 2 in)
- Weight: 68 kg (150 lb)
- Spike: 290 cm (114 in)
- Block: 281 cm (111 in)

Volleyball information
- Number: 14 (national team)

National team
1998	Bulgaria

Iliyana Gocheva (Bulgarian: Илияна Гочева, born 11 February 1976) is a retired Bulgarian volleyball player.

She was part of the Bulgaria women's national volleyball team at the 1998 FIVB Volleyball Women's World Championship in Japan, and the 2002 FIVB Volleyball Women's World Championship in Germany.
