= Slavka Ouzounova =

Bulgarian volleyball player (born 1971)

Slavka Uzunova

Personal information
- Full name: Slavka Ouzounova-Dimitrova
- Nationality: Bulgarian
- Born: 30 July 1971 (age 55); Pazardjik, Pazardzhik Province, Bulgaria
- Height: 186 cm (6 ft 1 in)
- Spike: 302 cm (119 in)
- Block: 290 cm (114 in)

Volleyball information
- Number: 8 (national team)

National team
1988-2003	Bulgaria

Slavka Uzunova (Bulgarian: Славка Узунова) (born 30 July 1971) is a retired Bulgarian female volleyball player.

She was part of the Bulgaria women's national volleyball team at the 1998 FIVB Volleyball Women's World Championship in Japan, and at the 2002 FIVB Volleyball Women's World Championship.
