= Elizabeth Castillo =

Peruvian volleyball player

Personal information
- Nationality: Peruvian
- Born: 21 July 1975 (age 51)
- Height: 173 cm (5 ft 8 in)
- Spike: 300 cm (118 in)
- Block: 292 cm (115 in)

National team
1995-1998	Peru

Elizabeth Castillo (born 21 July 1975) is a retired Peruvian female volleyball player. She was part of the Peruvian women's national volleyball team at the 1998 FIVB World Championship in Japan.

== Career ==
Castillo won the 1995 South American Club Championship gold medal playing with the Peruvian club Juventus Sipesa.
