= Chie Kanda =

Japanese volleyball player (born 1971)

Personal information
- Nationality: Japanese
- Born: 12 April 1971 (age 55); Shiraoka, Saitama, Japan
- Height: 1.83 m (6 ft 0 in)
- Spike: 3.12 m (123 in)
- Block: 2.92 m (115 in)

Volleyball information
- Position: Outside hitter
- Number: 4 (national team)

National team
1998	Japan
Honours
Women's volleyball
Representing Japan
Asian Games
Bronze medal – third place	1998 Bangkok	Team

Chie Kanda (born 12 April 1971) is a retired Japanese female volleyball player.

Kanda was part of the Japan women's national volleyball team at the 1998 FIVB World Championship in Japan.
