= Snježana Mijić =

Croatian volleyball player (born 1971)

Personal information
- Nationality: Croatian
- Born: 25 December 1971 (age 54); Ogulin

National team
1998	Croatia

Snježana Mijić (born 25 December 1971) is a Croatian former volleyball player. She was part of the Croatia women's national volleyball team at the 1998 FIVB Volleyball Women's World Championship in Japan. During her career she mostly played for HAOK Mladost Zagreb.

Mijić graduated from the law school. After finishing the playing career, she became a sports functionary, and in 2002 she held the role of sports director of all national volleyball teams, and a vice president of the European Volleyball Confederation.
