= Sršeň =

Sršeň is a Czech and Slovak surname. It means "hornet" in English.

Some notable people with the surname include:

- Lubomír Sršeň (born 1954), Czech weightlifter
- Tomáš Sršeň (born 1966), Czech ice hockey player
- Václav Sršeň (1925–1996), Czechoslovak footballer
