= Wanlapa Jid-ong =

Thai volleyball player (born 1977)

Wanlapa Jid-Ong
Personal information
- Nationality: Thailand
- Born: 2 June 1977 (age 49)
- Height: 1.70 m (5 ft 7 in)
- Spike: 275 cm (108 in)
- Block: 270 cm (106 in)

Volleyball information
- Position: Setter
- Current club: Pepsi Bangkok

National team
- Years: Team
- 1995-2002: Thailand

Wanlapa Jid-Ong (Thai: วัลภา จิตอ่อง, born 2 June 1977) is a retired Thai female volleyball player, who played as a setter.

She was part of the Thailand women's national volleyball team at the 1998 FIVB Volleyball Women's World Championship in Japan. and at the 2002 FIVB Volleyball Women's World Championship in Germany. On club level she played with Pepsi Bangkok.

== Clubs ==
- (Thailand) Pepsi Bangkok (2002)
