= Irma de Haas =

Dutch volleyball player (born 1975)

Personal information
- Nationality: Dutch
- Born: 29 December 1975 (age 50)
- Height: 170 cm (5 ft 7 in)
- Spike: 285 cm (112 in)
- Block: 276 cm (109 in)

Volleyball information
- Number: 9 (national team)

National team
1998	Netherlands

Irma de Haas (born 29 December 1975) is a retired Dutch female volleyball player.

She was part of the Netherlands women's national volleyball team at the 1998 FIVB Volleyball Women's World Championship in Japan.
