= Gui Chaoran =

Chinese volleyball player (born 1976)

Personal information
- Full name: Gui Chaoran
- Nationality: Chinese
- Born: January 8, 1976 (age 50); Shanghai, People's Republic of China

Gui Chaoran (Chinese: 桂超然; pinyin: Guì Chāorán, born 8 January 1976) is a Chinese former volleyball player who competed in the 2000 Summer Olympics.
