= Demetria Sance =

American volleyball player (born 1977)

Personal information
- Full name: Demetria Jean Sance
- Born: August 19, 1977 (age 49); San Antonio, Texas, U.S.
- Height: 5 ft 11 in (180 cm)

Volleyball information
- Position: Outside hitter
- Number: 1 (national team)
Medal record
Women's volleyball
Representing the United States
Pan American Games
Bronze medal – third place	1999 Winnipeg	Team

Demetria Jean Sance (born August 19, 1977) is a former indoor volleyball player. She played for the University of Texas at Austin and the United States women's national team.

== Career ==
Sance played volleyball at Texas from 1995 to 1998. In her first season, she was named the National Freshman of the Year. She went on to earn All-Conference and NCAA Regional All-Tournament honors during all four years at Texas. She set 21 school records, including most career kills, attacks, and digs.

After college, Sance joined the U.S. national team and played in the 2000 Summer Olympics. She later served as head coach of the Wagner High School volleyball team.

In 2003, Sance was admitted to the San Antonio Sports Hall of Fame.

== Personal ==
Sance was born on August 19, 1977, in San Antonio. She is 5 feet, 11 inches tall.
