= Ivana Troha =

Croatian volleyball player (born 1980)

Personal information
- Nationality: Croatian
- Born: 5 January 1980 (age 46)
- Height: 176 cm (5 ft 9 in)
- Spike: 282 cm (111 in)
- Block: 273 cm (107 in)

National team
1998	Croatia

Ivana Troha (born January 5, 1980) is a retired Croatian female volleyball player. She was part of the Croatian women's national volleyball team.

She participated at the 1998 FIVB Volleyball Women's World Championship in Japan.
