= Maria Likhtenstein =

Russian-Croatian volleyball player (born 1976)

Maria Likthtenchtein

Personal information
- Full name: Maria Likthtenchtein
- Nationality: Russian / Croatian
- Born: 7 February 1976 (age 50)
- Height: 180 cm (5 ft 11 in)
- Spike: 285 cm (112 in)
- Block: 278 cm (109 in)

Volleyball information
- Position: Setter

National team
| 1993–1996 | Russia |
| 1997–2007 | Croatia |
Honours
Women's volleyball
Representing Russia
European Championship
| Gold medal – first place | 1993 Czech Republic |
| Bronze medal – third place | 1995 Netherlands |
Representing Croatia
European Championship
| Silver medal – second place | 1999 Italy |

Maria Likthtenchtein, also spelled Likhtenstein or Liechtenstein (Russian: Мария Лихтенштейн, Croatian: Marija Lihtenštajn, born 7 February 1976) is a retired female volleyball player who played for the Russian (1993–1996) and the Croatian (1997–2007) national volleyball teams. She played for clubs in Russia, Croatia, Italy, Belgium, Greece and Turkey. Her retirement was announced in 2013, she won club and national team titles during her career.

== Career ==
=== Club ===
Her club career spanned in Russia, Croatia, Italy, Belgium, Greece and Turkey. She won the Russian Super League on five occasions, all with Uralochka Ekaterinburg and has also won the Croatian League and the Belgian League.

=== National teams ===
She was part of the Russia women's national volleyball team champion at the 1993 Women's European Volleyball Championship and third place at the 1995 Women's European Volleyball Championship.

From 1997 onwards she competed for the Croatia women's national volleyball team at the 1998 FIVB Volleyball Women's World Championship in Japan and the runners-up team at the 1999 Women's European Volleyball Championship.

== Clubs ==
This is an incomplete list of the clubs she played for.

- (Russia) Uralochka Ekaterinburg (before 1998)
- (Croatia) OK Dubrovnik (1998–1999)
- (Croatia) OK Kaštela (1999–2000)
- (Croatia) HAOK Mladost (2000–2001)
- (Russia) Uralochka-NTMK (2001–2002)
- (Italy) Terra Sarda Tortolì (2004–2005)
- (Belgium) Dauphines Charleroi (2005–2006)
- (Belgium) Euphony Tongere (2006–2007)
