= Slavica Kuzmanić =

Croatian volleyball player (born 1972)

Personal information
- Nationality: Croatian
- Born: 27 March 1972 (age 54)
- Height: 190 cm (6 ft 3 in)
- Spike: 310 cm (122 in)
- Block: 290 cm (114 in)

National team
1998	Croatia

Slavica Kuzmanić (born 27 March 1972) is a Croatian former volleyball player. She was part of the Croatia women's national volleyball team at the 1998 FIVB Volleyball Women's World Championship in Japan.
