= Miki Sasaki =

Japanese volleyball player (born 1976)

Personal information
- Full name: Miki Sasaki
- Nickname: Leo
- Born: 15 December 1976 (age 49); Muroran, Hokkaido, Japan
- Height: 1.82 m (6 ft 0 in)
- Weight: 77 kg (170 lb)
- Spike: 3.17 m (125 in)
- Block: 3.07 m (121 in)

Volleyball information
- Position: Wing-spiker
- Number: 4

National team
1997–2004	Japan
Honours
Women's volleyball
Representing Japan
Asian Games
Bronze medal – third place	1998 Bangkok	Team

Miki Sasaki (佐々木 みき, Sasaki Miki, born 15 December 1976) is a former volleyball player from Japan, who competed at the 2004 Summer Olympics in Athens, Greece, wearing the No. 4 jersey. There she and the Japan women's national team took fifth place. She participated in the 2003 FIVB World Grand Prix.

Sasaki played as a wing-spiker.
