= Mickisha Hurley =

American volleyball player

Personal information
- Born: Mickisha Hazelle Hurley; March 6, 1975 (age 51); Miami Shores, Florida, U.S.
- Height: 6 ft 0 in (1.83 m)
- Education: Barry University

Volleyball information
- Position: Middle blocker
- Number: 10

National team
1997–2000	United States
Medal record
Women's volleyball
Representing the United States
Pan American Games
Bronze medal – third place	1999 Winnipeg	Team

Mickisha Hazelle Hurley (born March 6, 1975) is an American former indoor volleyball player. She played for the United States national team at the 2000 Summer Olympics in Sydney. While on the national team, she was reported to have a block of 10'7".

Hurley won a bronze medal with the national team at the 1999 Pan American Games in Winnipeg.

== College ==
Hurley played college volleyball at Barry University and led the Buccaneers to an NCAA Division II Championship in 1995. She was a first-team All-American in 1994 and 1995.

Hurley was inducted into the Barry University Wall of Honor in 1998. She was inducted into the Sunshine State Conference Hall of Fame in 2002.

== Awards ==
- Two-time first-team All-American — 1994, 1995
- NCAA Division II Champion — 1995
- Barry University Wall of Honor — 1998
- Pan American Games bronze medal — 1999
- Sunshine State Conference Hall of Fame — 2002
