= Anna Ivanova (volleyball, born 1978) =

Bulgarian volleyball player (born 1978)

Personal information
- Nationality: Bulgarian
- Born: 6 February 1978 (age 48)
- Height: 187 cm (6 ft 2 in)
- Spike: 296 cm (117 in)
- Block: 291 cm (115 in)

Volleyball information
- Number: 17 (national team)

National team
| 1998 | Bulgaria |

Anna Ivanova (Bulgarian: Анна Иванова) (born 6 February 1978) is a retired Bulgarian female volleyball player. She was part of the Bulgaria women's national volleyball team at the 1998 FIVB Volleyball Women's World Championship in Japan.
