= Naomi Eto =

Japanese volleyball player (born 1972)

Personal information
- Born: 12 July 1972 (age 54); Kitakyushu, Fukuoka, Japan
- Height: 1.86 m (6 ft 1 in)
- Spike: 3.15 m (124 in)
- Block: 3.00 m (118 in)

Volleyball information
- Position: Middle blocker
- Number: 5 (national team)

National team
1994–1998	Japan
Honours
Women's volleyball
Representing Japan
Goodwill Games
Bronze medal – third place	1994 Saint Petersburg	Team
Asian Games
Bronze medal – third place	1998 Bangkok	Team

Naomi Eto (江藤 直美, Etō Naomi; born 12 July 1972) is a retired Japanese volleyball player. Eto helped the Japan women's national volleyball team win the bronze medal at the 1994 Goodwill Games in Saint Petersburg.

Eto competed with the national team at the 1998 FIVB World Championship in Japan, where she finished in eighth place.
