= Thailand women's national volleyball team =

Women's national volleyball team representing Thailand

Thailand
- Association: TVA
- Confederation: AVC
- Head coach: Kiattipong Radchatagriengkai
- FIVB ranking: 13 ▲5 (2 October 2026)

Uniforms
Home	Away	Third

Summer Olympics
- Appearances: 1 (First in 2028)

World Championship
- Appearances: 7 (First in 1998)
- Best result: 13th place (1998, 2010, 2018, 2022, 2025)

World Cup
- Appearances: 1 (First in 2007)
- Best result: 10th place (2007)

Asian Championship
- Appearances: 18 (First in 1987)
- Best result: (2009, 2013, 2023 2026)
- http://www.volleyball.or.th/
Honours
Event	1st	2nd	3rd
Asian Games	0	1	3
Asian Championship	4	2	3
World University Games	0	0	2
AVC Cup	1	1	4
Montreux Volley Masters	0	1	0
SEA Games	17	2	3
SEA V Cup	10	1	0
Total	32	8	15
Asian Games
Silver medal – second place	2018 Jakarta/Palembang	Team
Bronze medal – third place	2014 Incheon	Team
Bronze medal – third place	2022 Hangzhou	Team
Bronze medal – third place	2026 Aichi/Nagoya	Team
Asian Championship
Gold medal – first place	2009 Hanoi	
Gold medal – first place	2013 Nakhon Ratchasima	
Gold medal – first place	2023 Nakhon Ratchasima	
Gold medal – first place	2026 Tianjin	
Silver medal – second place	2017 Biñan	
Silver medal – second place	2019 Seoul	
Bronze medal – third place	2001 Nakhon Ratchasima	
Bronze medal – third place	2007 Nakhon Ratchasima	
Bronze medal – third place	2015 Tianjin	
World University Games
Bronze medal – third place	2001 Beijing	
Bronze medal – third place	2013 Kazan	
AVC Cup
Gold medal – first place	2012 Almaty	
Silver medal – second place	2010 Taicang	
Bronze medal – third place	2008 Nakhon Ratchasima	
Bronze medal – third place	2016 Vĩnh Phúc	
Bronze medal – third place	2018 Nakhon Ratchasima	
Bronze medal – third place	2022 Pasig	
Montreux Volley Masters
Silver medal – second place	2016 Switzerland	
SEA Games
Gold medal – first place	1989 Kuala Lumpur	Team
Gold medal – first place	1991 Manila	Team
Gold medal – first place	1995 Chang Mai	Team
Gold medal – first place	1997 Jakarta	Team
Gold medal – first place	2001 Kuala Lumpur	Team
Gold medal – first place	2003 Hanoi	Team
Gold medal – first place	2005 Manila	Team
Gold medal – first place	2007 Nakhon Ratchasima	Team
Gold medal – first place	2009 Vientiane	Team
Gold medal – first place	2011 Jakarta/Palembang	Team
Gold medal – first place	2013 Naypyidaw	Team
Gold medal – first place	2015 Singapore	Team
Gold medal – first place	2017 Kuala Lumpur	Team
Gold medal – first place	2019 Philippines	Team
Gold medal – first place	2021 Hanoi	Team
Gold medal – first place	2023 Phnom Penh	Team
Gold medal – first place	2025 Bangkok	Team
Silver medal – second place	1985 Bangkok	Team
Silver medal – second place	1993 Singapore	Team
Bronze medal – third place	1977 Kuala Lumpur	Team
Bronze medal – third place	1979 Jakarta	Team
Bronze medal – third place	1987 Jakarta	Team
SEA V.League
Gold medal – first place	2019 Nakhon Ratchasima / Santa Rosa	Team
Gold medal – first place	2022 Nakhon Ratchasima	Team
Gold medal – first place	2023 Vĩnh Phúc / Chiang Mai	Team
Gold medal – first place	2024 Vĩnh Phúc / Nakhon Ratchasima	Team
Gold medal – first place	2025 Nakhon Ratchasima	Team
Gold medal – first place	2026 Hanoi / Chiang Mai	Team
Silver medal – second place	2025 Ninh Bình	Team

The women's national volleyball team of Thailand (Thai: วอลเลย์บอลหญิงทีมชาติไทย) represents the Thailand in international volleyball competitions. It is managed by the Thailand Volleyball Association.

The team won a silver medal in the 2016 Montreux Masters, the best finish by any team outside the Americas, East Asia and Europe. Also, the team took a fourth-place finish in 2012 World Grand Prix. And the team took a bronze medal in Summer Universiade in two times, the best finish by any team outside the world.

In Asia, the team won a silver medal in the 2018 Asian Games and a bronze medal in the 2014 Asian Games. Also, the team won a gold medal in the Asian Championship in four times. And, the team won a gold medal in the Asian Cup Championship. The country has also participated in four World Championships, one World Cup, fourteen World Grand Prixs and two World Grand Champions Cup.

Thailand's women's national volleyball team clinched their 17th SEA Games gold medal on December 15, 2025, defeating Vietnam 3-2 in a thrilling final at Indoor Stadium Huamark.

Thailand won the 2026 AVC Women's Volleyball Continental Championship in Tianjin, China after beating hosts China 3-2, qualifying for the 2028 Summer Olympics. Thailand is the first country from Southeast Asia, men's or women's, to qualify for the Olympic volleyball tournament.

== History ==
Volleyball had spread into Thailand since before 1900s. In the past, volleyball was a popular sport among the Chinese and Vietnamese. Until there was competition between the clubs and community associations, sometimes contacted to compete in the Northern region, Northeastern region and The Gold Cup volleyball tournament in the Southern Region.

Since 1934 the Ministry of Education published rules of volleyball by Noppakun Pongsuwan. He was an expert person on sports, especially volleyball. He invited a lecture on how to play, the rules of volleyball to physical education teachers. After that, Department of Physical Education had provide an annual girls' volleyball tournament. For the first time, Department of Physical Education had set course of the central physical education school for girls' student to studied Volleyball and Netball.

In 1957, Nawa Akat Ek Luang Supachalasai, Director of the Department of Physical Education had been established the "Amateur Volleyball Association of Thailand" (Thai: สมาคมวอลเลย์บอลสมัครเล่นแห่งประเทศไทย), with the aim to supported and publicized the progress volleyball and managed a 6 players volleyball tournament and the annual volleyball competition in other government office, such as the Department of Physical Education, University Sports Committee, Bangkok Municipality, Military Sports Council, as well as the Thailand National Games volleyball tournament in women's and men's volleyball.

== Current squad ==
Head coach: (Thailand) Kiattipong Radchatagriengkai

The following is the Thailand roster from 2026 AVC Women's Volleyball Continental Championship

No.	Name	Position	Date of birth	Height	Spike	Block	Current Club
2	Piyanut Pannoy	L	10 November 1989	1.71 m (5 ft 7 in)	285 cm (9 ft 4 in)	276 cm (9 ft 1 in)	(United States) LOVB Atlanta
3	Pornpun Guedpard (c)	S	5 May 1993	1.73 m (5 ft 8 in)	290 cm (9 ft 6 in)	285 cm (9 ft 4 in)	(United States) San Francisco Signal
4	Kanyarat Kunmuang	MB	14 October 2002	1.85 m (6 ft 1 in)	296 cm (9 ft 9 in)	290 cm (9 ft 6 in)	(Thailand) Supreme Chonburi
5	Thatdao Nuekjang	MB	3 February 1994	1.86 m (6 ft 1 in)	310 cm (10 ft 2 in)	305 cm (10 ft 0 in)	(Japan) PFU Blue Cats
6	Warisara Seetaloed	OH	31 October 2005	1.74 m (5 ft 9 in)	285 cm (9 ft 4 in)	282 cm (9 ft 3 in)	(Thailand) Supreme Chonburi
9	Kalyarat Khamwong	L	8 June 2005	1.68 m (5 ft 6 in)	264 cm (8 ft 8 in)	260 cm (8 ft 6 in)	(Thailand) Nakhonnont
11	Sasipaporn Janthawisut	OH	10 June 1997	1.78 m (5 ft 10 in)	297 cm (9 ft 9 in)	287 cm (9 ft 5 in)	(United States) LOVB Salt Lake
15	Natthanicha Jaisaen	S	21 May 1998	1.72 m (5 ft 8 in)	283 cm (9 ft 3 in)	276 cm (9 ft 1 in)	(United States) Grand Rapids Rise
16	Pimpichaya Kokram	OP	16 June 1998	1.80 m (5 ft 11 in)	310 cm (10 ft 2 in)	303 cm (9 ft 11 in)	(United States) LOVB Atlanta
18	Ajcharaporn Kongyot	OH	18 June 1995	1.83 m (6 ft 0 in)	308 cm (10 ft 1 in)	295 cm (9 ft 8 in)	(United States) Dallas Pulse
19	Chatchu-On Moksri	OH	6 November 1999	1.81 m (5 ft 11 in)	302 cm (9 ft 11 in)	298 cm (9 ft 9 in)	(Japan) Saitama Ageo Medics
29	Wimonrat Thanapan	MB	2 April 2002	1.80 m (5 ft 11 in)	289 cm (9 ft 6 in)	283 cm (9 ft 3 in)	(Japan) Aranmare Yamagata
30	Jidapa Nahuanong	L	22 February 2002	1.72 m (5 ft 8 in)	278 cm (9 ft 1 in)	271 cm (8 ft 11 in)	(Japan) Saitama Ageo Medics
41	Kaewkalaya Kamulthala	MB	7 August 1994	1.82 m (6 ft 0 in)	298 cm (9 ft 9 in)	281 cm (9 ft 3 in)	(Thailand) PEA Sisaket

== 2026 Results and fixtures ==
=== Summary all tournaments ===
No	Tournaments	Pld	W	L	PIt	SW	SL	SR	SPW	SPL	SPR	Ranking
1	VNL	12	3	9	12	17	28	0.607	956	1018	0.939	14th
2	SEA V Cup – 1st Leg	3	3	0	8	9	3	3.000	284	236	1.203	1st place, gold medalist(s)
3	SEA V Cup – 2nd Leg	3	3	0	9	9	0	MAX	225	147	1.531	1st place, gold medalist(s)
4	Asian Championship	6	6	0	17	18	4	4.5	517	414	1.249	1st place, gold medalist(s)
5	Asian Games	6	5	1	16	17	3	5.667	470	368	1.277	3rd place, bronze medalist(s)

==== Intercontinental tournaments ====
FIVB Nations League
Opponent	Date	Result	Set						Location	Round
Opponent	Date	Result	1	2	3	4	5	Total	Location	Round
Serbia	June 3, 2026	0–3	24–26	22–25	19–25			65–76	Nanjing, China	Preliminary round
China	June 4, 2026	2–3	14–25	26–24	19–25	25–23	7–15	91–112	Nanjing, China	Preliminary round
Belgium	June 6, 2026	2–3	25–20	25–22	23–25	22–25	14–16	109–108	Nanjing, China	Preliminary round
Czech Republic	June 7, 2026	0–3	14–25	19–25	11–25			44–75	Nanjing, China	Preliminary round
Ukraine	June 17, 2026	2–3	23–25	25–19	26–28	25–22	10–15	109–109	Bangkok, Thailand	Preliminary round
Bulgaria	June 18, 2026	3–0	25–22	25–20	25–17			75–59	Bangkok, Thailand	Preliminary round
Canada	June 20, 2026	3–1	25–21	22–25	25–18	25–20		97–84	Bangkok, Thailand	Preliminary round
Netherlands	June 21, 2026	0–3	23–25	22–25	15–25			60–75	Bangkok, Thailand	Preliminary round
United States	July 8, 2026	0–3	21–25	18–25	20–25			59–75	Osaka, Japan	Preliminary round
Japan	July 9, 2026	1–3	15–25	21–25	25–22	22–25		83–97	Osaka, Japan	Preliminary round
Brazil	July 11, 2026	3–0	25–15	25–16	25–17			75–48	Osaka, Japan	Preliminary round
Turkey	July 12, 2026	1–3	27–25	21–25	19–25	22–25		89–100	Osaka, Japan	Preliminary round

==== Continental tournaments ====
AVC Continental Championship
Opponent	Date	Result	Set						Location	Round
Opponent	Date	Result	1	2	3	4	5	Total	Location	Round
Australia	August 21, 2026	3–0	25–15	25–15	25–18			75–48	Tianjin, China	Preliminary round
Indonesia	August 24, 2026	3–0	25–16	25–18	25–15			75–49	Tianjin, China	Preliminary round
Kazakhstan	August 25, 2026	3–1	25–22	25–16	23–25	25–11		98–74	Tianjin, China	Preliminary round
South Korea	August 27, 2026	3–0	25–20	25–18	25–21			75–59	Tianjin, China	Quarterfinals
Japan	August 29, 2026	3–1	25–21	25–20	20–25	25–20		95–86	Tianjin, China	Semifinals
China	August 30, 2026	3–2	25–20	11–25	23–25	25–18	15–10	99–98	Tianjin, China	Final

20th Asian Games
Opponent	Date	Result	Set						Location	Round
Opponent	Date	Result	1	2	3	4	5	Total	Location	Round
Mongolia	September 16, 2026	3–0	25–12	25–18	25–18			75–48	Aichi, Japan	Preliminary round
Kyrgyzstan	September 17, 2026	3–0	25–13	25–7	25–7			75–27	Aichi, Japan	Preliminary round
Chinese Taipei	September 18, 2026	3–0	25–22	25–22	25–20			75–64	Aichi, Japan	Preliminary round
Indonesia	September 20, 2026	3–0	25–10	29–27	25–16			79–53	Aichi, Japan	Quarterfinals
China	September 21, 2026	2–3	25–23	21–25	11–25	28–26	6–15	91–114	Aichi, Japan	Semifinals
South Korea	September 22, 2026	3–0	25–20	25–19	25–23			75–62	Aichi, Japan	Bronze Match

SEA V Cup
Opponent	Date	Result	Set						Location	Round
Opponent	Date	Result	1	2	3	4	5	Total	Location	Round
Indonesia	July 31, 2026	3–1	25–21	32–34	25–21	25–19		107–95	Hanoi, Vietnam	Leg 1
Philippines	August 1, 2026	3–2	25–17	19–25	25–15	18–25	15–10	102–92	Hanoi, Vietnam	Leg 1
Vietnam	August 2, 2026	3–0	25–18	25–17	25–14			75–49	Hanoi, Vietnam	Leg 1
Philippines	August 7, 2026	3–0	25–19	25–17	25–19			75–55	Chiang Mai, Thailand	Leg 2
Indonesia	August 8, 2026	3–0	25–18	25–17	25–12			75–47	Chiang Mai, Thailand	Leg 2
Vietnam	August 9, 2026	3–0	25–20	25–10	25–15			75–45	Chiang Mai, Thailand	Leg 2

==== Friendly Matches ====
Springs World Challenge Volleyball
Opponent	Date	Result	Set						Location	Round
Opponent	Date	Result	1	2	3	4	5	Total	Location	Round
(Japan) Saga Hisamitsu Springs	September 12, 2026	1–3	18–25	22–25	25–17	16–25		81–92	Saga, Japan	None

== Coaching staff ==
Position	Name
Coach	(Thailand) Kiattipong Radchatagriengkai
Assistant coach	(Thailand) Wilavan Apinyapong

== Head coach ==
- (Thailand) Nataphon Srisamutnak (2002–2005, 2024)
- (Thailand) Danai Sriwatcharamethakul (2016–2024)
- (Thailand) Kittikun Sriutthawong (2021) Only VNL 2021
- (Thailand) Kiattipong Radchatagriengkai (1998–2016, 2025–present)

== Former players ==
- Amporn Hyapha
- Anna Paijinda
- Bhudsabun Prasaengkaew
- Bouard Lithawat
- Chitaporn Kamlangmak
- Darin Pinsuwan
- Em-orn Phanusit
- Gullapa Piampongsan
- Hathairat Jarat
- Jarasporn Bundasak
- Jutarat Montripila
- Kaewkalaya Kamulthala
- Kamonporn Sukmak
- Kannika Thipachot
- Karina Krause
- Laddawan Srisakorn
- Likhit Namsen
- Malika Kanthong
- Malinee Kongtan
- Nantakan Petchplay
- Narumon Khanan
- Nuttaporn Sanitklang
- Nootsara Tomkom
- Nurak Nokputta
- Onuma Sittirak
- Parinya Pankaew
- Patcharee Sangmuang
- Piyamas Koijapo
- Pleumjit Thinkaow
- Prim Intawong
- Rasamee Supamool
- Rattanaporn Sanuanram
- Saranya Srisakorn
- Saymai Paladsrichuay
- Sineenat Phocharoen
- Sirima Manakij
- Sommai Niyompon
- Sontaya Keawbundit
- Soraya Phomla
- Supattra Pairoj
- Suphap Phongthong
- Sutadta Chuewulim
- Tapaphaipun Chaisri
- Tichakorn Boonlert
- Tichaya Boonlert
- Tikamporn Changkeaw
- Utaiwan Kaensing
- Wanida Kotruang
- Wanitchaya Luangtonglang
- Wanlapa Jid-ong
- Wanna Buakaew
- Warapan Thinprabat
- Watchareeya Nuanjam
- Wilavan Apinyapong
- Wisuta Heebkaew
- Donphon Sinpho
- Kanchana Sisaikaeo
- Natthawan Phatthaisong
- Waruni Kanram
- Nattharika Wasan
- Jasithorn Jetta
- Natnicha Saelao
- Wiranyupa Inchan

== Competition history ==
Semifinalist
Champions/Gold	Runners-up/Silver	Third place/Bronze	Fourth place

=== Olympic Games ===
Olympic Games record
Year	Round	Position	Pld	W	L	SW	SL	Squad
(Japan) 1964	Did not qualify							
(Mexico) 1968	Did not qualify							
(Germany) 1972	Did not qualify							
(Canada) 1976	Did not qualify							
(Soviet Union) 1980	Did not qualify							
(United States) 1984	Did not qualify							
(South Korea) 1988	Did not qualify							
(Spain) 1992	Did not qualify							
(United States) 1996	Did not qualify							
(Australia) 2000	Did not qualify							
(Greece) 2004	Did not qualify							
(China) 2008	Did not qualify							
(United Kingdom) 2012	Did not qualify							
(Brazil) 2016	Did not qualify							
(Japan) 2020	Did not qualify							
(France) 2024	Did not qualify							
(United States) 2028	Qualified							
(Australia) 2032	future events							
Total	1/17		0	0	0	0	0	

=== World Cup ===
World Cup record
Year	Round	Position	Pld	W	L	SW	SL
(China) 1990	Did not qualify						
(Brazil) 1994	Did not qualify						
(Japan) 1998	First round	13th place	3	0	3	0	9
(Germany) 2002	First round	17th place	5	1	4	4	13
(Japan) 2006	Did not qualify						
(Japan) 2010	Second round	13th place	9	4	5	13	18
(Italy) 2014	First round	17th place	5	1	4	3	12
(Japan) 2018	Second round	13th place	9	3	6	16	22
(Netherlands) (Poland) 2022	Second round	13th place	9	4	5	16	19
(Thailand) 2025	Round of 16	13th place	4	2	2	8	7
(Canada) (United States) 2027	Qualified						
(Philippines) 2029	To be determined						
Total	7/22		44	15	29	60	100

=== World Cup (formerly) ===
World Cup record (formerly)
Year	Round	Position	Pld	W	L	SW	SL
(Japan) 1991	Did not qualify						
(Japan) 1995	Did not qualify						
(Japan) 1999	Did not qualify						
(Japan) 2003	Did not qualify						
(Japan) 2007	Round Robin	10th place	11	2	9	11	29
(Japan) 2011	Did not qualify						
(Japan) 2015	Did not qualify						
(Japan) 2019	Did not qualify						
(Japan) 2023	Did not compete						
Total	1/14		11	2	9	11	29

=== World Grand Champions Cup ===
World Grand Champions Cup record
Year	Round	Position	Pld	W	L	SW	SL
(Japan) 1993	Did not qualify						
(Japan) 1997	Did not qualify						
(Japan) 2001	Did not qualify						
(Japan) 2005	Did not qualify						
(Japan) 2009	Round Robin	6th place	5	0	5	3	15
(Japan) 2013	Round Robin	5th place	5	1	4	5	13
(Japan) 2017	Did not qualify						
Total	2/7		10	1	9	8	28

=== World Grand Prix ===
World Grand Prix record
Year	Round	Position	Pld	W	L	SW	SL
(Hong Kong) 2002	Preliminary round	8th place	9	0	9	4	27
(Italy) 2003	Preliminary round	10th place	5	1	4	3	13
(Italy) 2004	Preliminary round	10th place	9	1	8	8	26
(Japan) 2005	Preliminary round	12th place	9	0	9	2	27
(Italy) 2006	Preliminary round	11th place	9	1	8	7	26
(China) 2007	Did not participate						
(Japan) 2008	Preliminary round	11th place	9	1	8	10	26
(Japan) 2009	Preliminary round	8th place	9	4	5	15	21
(China) 2010	Preliminary round	10th place	9	2	7	8	23
(Macau) 2011	Finals	6th place	13	6	6	21	25
(China) 2012	Finals	Fourth place	14	9	5	30	21
(Japan) 2013	Preliminary round	13th place	9	3	6	11	20
(Japan) 2014	Preliminary round (Group 1)	11th place	9	2	7	11	24
(United States) 2015	Preliminary round (Group 1)	9th place	9	3	6	11	21
(Thailand) 2016	Finals (Group 1)	6th place	12	2	10	7	33
(China) 2017	Preliminary round (Group 1)	10th place	9	3	6	16	18
Total	15/25		143	38	105	164	351

=== Nations League ===
Nations League record
Year	Round	Position	Pld	W	L	SW	SL
(China) 2018	Preliminary round	15th place	15	2	13	17	41
(China) 2019	Preliminary round	12th place	15	5	10	17	33
(Italy) 2021	Preliminary round	16th place	15	2	13	11	40
(Turkey) 2022	Quarterfinals	8th place	13	5	8	23	28
(United States) 2023	Preliminary round	14th place	12	2	10	11	30
(Thailand) 2024	Quarterfinals	8th place	13	3	10	12	35
(Poland) 2025	Preliminary round	17th place	12	1	11	11	34
(Macau) 2026	Preliminary round	14th place	12	3	9	17	28
(N/A) 2027	qualified						
Total	9/9		107	23	84	119	269

=== Asian Games ===
Asian Games record
Year	Round	Position	Pld	W	L	SW	SL
(Thailand) 1966	Round robin	5th place	5	1	4	4	12
(Thailand) 1970	Round robin	Insufficient information to determine					
(Iran) 1974	Did not enter						
(Thailand) 1978	Round robin	5th place	5	1	4	3	13
(India) 1982	Did not enter						
(South Korea) 1986	Round robin	Fourth place	4	1	3	3	11
(China) 1990	Round robin	6th place	5	0	5	0	15
(Japan) 1994	Round robin	5th place	5	1	4	3	12
(Thailand) 1998	Semifinals	Fourth place	4	1	3	3	9
(South Korea) 2002	Round robin	5th place	5	1	4	3	13
(Qatar) 2006	Semifinals	Fourth place	7	3	4	10	13
(China) 2010	5th–8th places	5th place	7	4	3	15	10
(South Korea) 2014	Semifinals	Bronze	6	4	2	13	7
(Indonesia) 2018	Final	Silver	7	6	1	18	5
(China) 2022	Semifinals	Bronze	6	4	2	12	7
(Japan) 2026	Semifinals	Bronze	6	5	1	17	3
Total	14/16		—				

=== Asian Championship ===
Asian Championship record
Year	Round	Position	Pld	W	L	SW	SL
(China) 1987	5th–8th places	5th place	7	5	2	Insufficient information to determine	
(Hong Kong) 1989	5th–8th places	6th place	6	3	3	Insufficient information to determine	
(Thailand) 1991	5th–8th places	7th place	7	4	3	Insufficient information to determine	
(China) 1993	7th place match	7th place	5	2	3	Insufficient information to determine	
(Thailand) 1995	5th–8th places	5th place	6	4	2	Insufficient information to determine	
(Philippines) 1997	5th–8th places	5th place	6	4	2	12	6
(Hong Kong) 1999	Championship	Fourth place	5	2	3	8	9
(Thailand) 2001	Semifinals	Third place	6	4	2	13	9
(Vietnam) 2003	Semifinals	Fourth place	7	4	3	13	10
(China) 2005	5th–8th places	6th place	8	4	4	14	13
(Thailand) 2007	Championship	Third place	7	5	2	16	10
(Vietnam) 2009	Final	Champions	8	6	2	20	9
(Taiwan) 2011	Semifinals	Fourth place	7	3	4	14	12
(Thailand) 2013	Final	Champions	8	7	1	22	6
(China) 2015	Semifinals	Third place	8	6	2	21	6
(Philippines) 2017	Final	Runners-up	8	6	2	21	8
(South Korea) 2019	Final	Runners-up	6	4	2	14	8
(Philippines) 2021	Canceled due to COVID-19 pandemic						
(Thailand) 2023	Final	Champions	6	6	0	18	5
(China) 2026	Final	Champions	6	6	0	18	4
Total	19/22	4 titles	127	85	42	—	

=== Asian Cup ===
Asian Cup record
Year	Round	Position	Pld	W	L	SW	SL
(Thailand) 2008	Semifinals	Third place	6	4	2	14	8
(China) 2010	Final	Runners-up	6	5	1	15	7
(Kazakhstan) 2012	Final	Champions	6	6	0	18	2
(China) 2014	5th–8th places	5th place	6	2	4	8	12
(Vietnam) 2016	Semifinals	Third place	6	5	1	17	5
(Thailand) 2018	Semifinals	Third place	5	4	1	14	4
(Taiwan) 2020	Canceled due to COVID-19 pandemic						
(Philippines) 2022	Semifinals	Third place	6	4	2	14	7
Total	7/7	1 title	41	30	11	100	45

=== Montreux Masters ===
Montreux Masters record
Year	Round	Position	Pld	W	L	SW	SL
(Switzerland) 2016	Final	Runners-up	5	4	1	12	9
(Switzerland) 2017	Classification round	7th place	4	0	4	4	12
(Switzerland) 2018	Did not participate						
(Switzerland) 2019	Semifinals	Fourth place	5	2	3	7	11
Total	3/34		14	6	8	23	32

=== SEA Games ===
SEA Games record
Year	Position	Pld	W	L	SW	SL
(Malaysia) 1977	Bronze	No info				
(Indonesia) 1979	Bronze	No info				
(Philippines) 1981	No info					
(Singapore) 1983	Fourth place	Insufficient information to determine				
(Thailand) 1985	Silver	No info				
(Indonesia) 1987	Bronze	No info				
(Malaysia) 1989	Gold	No info				
(Philippines) 1991	Gold	No info				
(Singapore) 1993	Silver	No info				
(Thailand) 1995	Gold	No info				
(Indonesia) 1997	Gold	No info				
(Brunei) 1999	No Volleyball tournaments in this competition					
(Malaysia) 2001	Gold	5	5	0	15	0
(Vietnam) 2003	Gold	7	7	0	21	1
(Philippines) 2005	Gold	5	5	0	15	0
(Thailand) 2007	Gold	4	4	0	12	0
(Laos) 2009	Gold	4	4	0	12	2
(Indonesia) 2011	Gold	5	5	0	15	1
(Myanmar) 2013	Gold	5	5	0	15	0
(Singapore) 2015	Gold	4	4	0	12	1
(Malaysia) 2017	Gold	4	4	0	12	0
(Philippines) 2019	Gold	4	4	0	12	0
(Vietnam) 2021	Gold	5	5	0	15	1
(Cambodia) 2023	Gold	5	5	0	15	1
(Thailand) 2025	Gold	4	4	0	12	2
Total	17 titles	—				

=== SEA V Cup ===
SEA V Cup record
Year	Host	Leg	Round	Position	Pld	W	L	SW	SL
2019	(Thailand)	1	Round Robin	Champions	3	3	0	9	2
2019	(Philippines)	2	Round Robin	Champions	3	3	0	9	0
2022	(Thailand)	–	Round Robin	Champions	3	3	0	9	0
2023	(Vietnam)	1	Round Robin	Champions	3	3	0	9	1
2023	(Thailand)	2	Round Robin	Champions	3	3	0	9	0
2024	(Vietnam)	1	Round Robin	Champions	3	3	0	9	2
2024	(Thailand)	2	Round Robin	Champions	3	3	0	9	1
2025	(Thailand)	1	Round Robin	Champions	3	3	0	9	4
2025	(Vietnam)	2	Round Robin	Runners-up	3	2	1	8	4
2026	(Vietnam)	1	Round Robin	Champions	3	3	0	9	3
2026	(Thailand)	2	Round Robin	Champions	3	3	0	9	0
Total	6/11		11/11	10 titles	33	32	1	98	17

== Head-to-head record ==
This page shows the Thailand women's national volleyball team's head-to-head record in FIVB and Olympic qualification tournaments.

Opponent	GP	MW	ML	SW	SL
Algeria	1	1	0	3	0
Argentina	4	4	0	12	0
Australia	3	3	0	9	1
Azerbaijan	3	2	1	8	6
Belgium	7	1	6	10	19
Brazil	26	2	24	10	72
Bulgaria	6	4	2	16	9
Canada	8	5	3	19	11
China	26	4	22	20	73
Chinese Taipei	3	3	0	9	0
Colombia	1	1	0	3	1
Croatia	4	2	2	6	6
Cuba	11	4	7	17	25
Czech Republic	3	1	2	3	7
Dominican Republic	17	5	12	25	41
Egypt	1	1	0	3	1
France	2	2	0	6	3
Germany	18	5	13	21	42
Greece	1	0	1	0	3
Indonesia	1	1	0	3	0
Italy	22	2	20	16	62
Japan	28	3	25	23	80
Kazakhstan	8	5	3	18	12
Kenya	1	1	0	3	2
Mexico	1	1	0	3	0
Netherlands	15	1	14	6	43
Nigeria	1	1	0	3	0
Peru	4	4	0	12	0
Poland	17	4	13	17	47
Puerto Rico	9	8	1	24	7
Russia	19	2	17	17	53
Serbia	18	6	12	23	43
Slovenia	1	1	0	3	0
South Korea	21	9	12	34	43
Sweden	1	1	0	3	0
Trinidad and Tobago	1	1	0	3	1
Turkey	13	2	11	12	35
Ukraine	1	0	1	2	3
United States	30	1	29	23	89

== See also ==
- Thailand men's national volleyball team
- Thailand women's national under-19 volleyball team
- Thailand women's national under-21 volleyball team
- Thailand women's national under-23 volleyball team
