= Junko Moriyama =

Japanese volleyball player (born 1975)

Personal information
- Nationality: Japanese
- Born: 26 February 1975 (age 51); Beppu, Oita, Japan
- Height: 1.80 m (5 ft 11 in)
- Spike: 2.97 m (117 in)
- Block: 2.92 m (115 in)

Volleyball information
- Position: Middle blocker
- Number: 9 (national team)

National team
1998-2001	Japan
Honours
Women's volleyball
Representing Japan
Asian Games
Bronze medal – third place	1998 Bangkok	Team

Junko Moriyama (森山 淳子, Moriyama Junko; born 26 February 1975) is a retired Japanese female volleyball player.

She was part of the Japan women's national volleyball team at the 1998 FIVB World Championship in Japan.
