= Sabrina Bertini =

Italian volleyball player (born 1969)

Personal information
- Nationality: Italian
- Born: 30 October 1969 (age 57); Pisa, Italy
- Height: 182 cm (6 ft 0 in)

Volleyball information
- Position: Outside hitter
- Number: 8

National team
1986–2000	Italy
Honours
Women's volleyball
Representing Italy
European Championship
Bronze medal – third place	1989 West Germany
Bronze medal – third place	1999 Italy
Mediterranean Games
Gold medal – first place	1991 Athens

Sabrina Bertini (born 30 October 1969) is an Italian former volleyball player. She competed in the women's tournament at the 2000 Summer Olympics in Sydney, Australia.
