= Hiromi Suzuki (volleyball) =

Japanese volleyball player (born 1978)

Personal information
- Nationality: Japanese
- Born: 14 November 1978 (age 47); Kumagaya, Saitama, Japan
- Height: 1.84 m (6 ft 0 in)
- Spike: 3.00 m (118 in)
- Block: 2.81 m (111 in)

Volleyball information
- Position: Middle blocker
- Number: 15 (national team)

National team
| 1998-2003 | Japan |
Honours
Women's volleyball
Representing Japan
Asian Games
| Bronze medal – third place | 1998 Bangkok | Team |

Hiromi Suzuki (鈴木 洋美, Suzuki Hiromi; born 14 November 1978) is a retired Japanese female volleyball player.

Suzuki was part of the Japan women's national volleyball team at the 1998 FIVB World Championship in Japan.
