= Asako Tajimi =

Japanese volleyball player

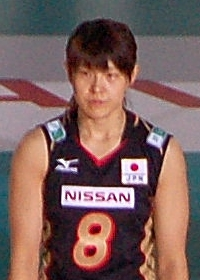

Personal information
- Full name: Asako Tajimi
- Nickname: Asako
- Born: 26 June 1972 (age 54); Mitaka, Tokyo, Japan
- Height: 1.80 m (5 ft 11 in)
- Weight: 68 kg (150 lb)
- Spike: 308 cm (121 in)

Volleyball information
- Position: Middle blocker
- Number: 9 (1992); 12 (1996); 2 (2008)

National team
1991–2008	Japan
Honours
Women's volleyball
Representing Japan
Goodwill Games
Bronze medal – third place	1994 Saint Petersburg	Team
Asian Games
Bronze medal – third place	1994 Hiroshima	Team
Bronze medal – third place	1998 Bangkok	Team

Asako Tajimi (多治見麻子 Tajimi Asako, born 26 June 1972) is a Japanese former volleyball player and three-time Olympian. She competed with the Japanese women's national volleyball team at the 1992, 1996, and 2008 Olympics.

Tajimi helped Japan win the bronze medal at the 1994 Goodwill Games in Saint Petersburg.

== Clubs ==
- HachioujiJissen High School → Hitachi (1999–2001) → Pioneer Red Wings(2001–2011) → Hitachi Rivale (2011–2012)

== Honours ==
- 1991: 25th Japan Volleyball League New Face award
- 1992: 26th Japan Volleyball League Block award, Best 6
- 1993: 27th Japan Volleyball League Block award, Best 6
- 2008: 5th place in the Olympic Games of Beijing
