= Kang Mee-sun =

South Korean volleyball player (born 1971)

Personal information
- Nationality: South Korean
- Born: 27 March 1971 (age 55)
- Height: 175 cm (5 ft 9 in)
- Spike: 307 cm (121 in)
- Block: 289 cm (114 in)

Volleyball information
- Number: 5 (national team)

Career
| Years | Teams |
|---|---|
| 1994 | Heungkuk Life |

National team
| 1994–1998 | South Korea |

- Kang Mee-sun
- Hangul: 강미선
- Hanja: 姜美善
- RR: Gang Miseon
- MR: Kang Misŏn

Kang Mee-sun or Kang Mi-sun (born 27 March 1971) is a retired South Korean female volleyball player. She was part of the South Korea women's national volleyball team.

She participated in the 1994 FIVB Volleyball Women's World Championship, and at the 1998 FIVB Volleyball Women's World Championship in Japan. On the club level she played with Heungkuk Life.

== Clubs ==
- Heungkuk Life (1994)
