= Vanesa Sršen =

Croatian volleyball player (born 1971)

Personal information
- Nationality: Croatian
- Born: 23 December 1971 (age 54)
- Height: 184 cm (6 ft 0 in)
- Spike: 295 cm (116 in)
- Block: 285 cm (112 in)

Volleyball information

National team
- Years: Team
- 1998: Croatia

Vanesa Sršen (born 23 December 1971) is a retired Croatian female volleyball player.

She was part of the Croatia women's national volleyball team at the 1998 FIVB Volleyball Women's World Championship in Japan.
