= Chikako Kumamae =

Japanese volleyball player (born 1974)

Personal information
- Nationality: Japanese
- Born: 11 April 1974 (age 52)
- Height: 1.80 m (5 ft 11 in)
- Spike: 3.04 m (120 in)
- Block: 2.95 m (116 in)

Volleyball information
- Position: Outside hitter
- Number: 8 (national team)

National team
1997-2002	Japan
Honours
Women's volleyball
Representing Japan
World Grand Champions Cup
Bronze medal – third place	2001 Japan
Asian Games
Bronze medal – third place	1998 Bangkok	Team
Bronze medal – third place	2002 Busan	Team

Chikako Kumamae (born 11 April 1974) is a retired Japanese female volleyball player.

Kumamae was part of the Japan women's national volleyball team at the 1998 FIVB World Championship in Japan.
