= Jung Eun-sun =

South Korean volleyball player (born 1973)

Personal information
- Nationality: South Korean
- Born: 6 April 1973 (age 53)
- Height: 177 cm (5 ft 10 in)
- Spike: 308 cm (121 in)
- Block: 291 cm (115 in)

Volleyball information
- Number: 9 (national team)

National team
1998	South Korea

- Jung Eun-sun
- Hangul: 정은선
- RR: Jeong Eunseon
- MR: Chŏng Ŭnsŏn

Jung Eun-sun (Korean: 정은선; born 6 April 1973) is a retired South Korean volleyball player. She was part of the South Korea women's national volleyball team.

She participated at the 1994 FIVB Volleyball Women's World Championship, and at the 1998 FIVB Volleyball Women's World Championship in Japan.
