= Ikumi Narita =

Japanese volleyball player

Personal information
- Full name: Ikumi Narita
- Nickname: Iku
- Born: Ikumi Ogake (大懸 郁久美, Ōgake Ikumi); January 1, 1976 (age 50); Asahikawa, Hokkaido, Japan
- Height: 1.73 m (5 ft 8 in)
- Weight: 68 kg (150 lb)
- Spike: 299 cm (118 in)
- Block: 284 cm (112 in)

Volleyball information
- Position: Wing Spiker / Libero
- Number: 3 (national team)

National team
1996–2004	Japan
Honours
Women's volleyball
Representing Japan
Asian Games
Bronze medal – third place	1998 Bangkok	Team

Ikumi Narita (成田 郁久美, Narita Ikumi; born January 1, 1976) is a Japanese former volleyball player. Her maiden name is Ikumi Ogake (大懸 郁久美, Ōgake Ikumi).

Narita competed at the 2004 Summer Olympics in Athens, Greece, where she finished in fifth place with the Japan women's national team. She played as a wing-spiker. She was named Best Digger and Best Receiver at the 2004 FIVB Women's World Olympic Qualification Tournament.

== Clubs ==
- AsahikawaJitsugyo High School → NEC Red Rockets (1994–2001) → Hisamitsu Springs (2003–2007) → NEC Red Rockets (2007–2010) → Pioneer Red Wings (2009–2011)

== Honours ==
- 1996: 9th place in the Olympic Games
- 1998: 8th place in the World Championship
- 1998: 3rd place in the Asian Games
- 1999: 6th place in the World Cup
- 2004: 5th place in the Olympic Games

== Individual awards ==
- 1997 3rd V.League : Serve receive award, Best 6
- 1998 4th V.League : Excellent Player award, Servereceive award, Best 6
- 1999 5th V.League : Best 6
- 2000 6th V.League : Excellent Player award, Best 6
- 2001 7th V.League : Serve receive award, Best 6
- 2004 Olympic Qualifier "Best Digger"
- 2004 Olympic Qualifier "Best Receiver"
- 2006 12th V.League : Receive award
- 2007 2006-07 V.Premier League : Receive award
