= Ku Min-jung =

South Korean volleyball player

Personal information
- Nationality: South Korea
- Born: 25 August 1973 (age 53); Jeollabuk-do, South Korea
- Height: 1.81 m (5 ft 11 in)
- Weight: 73 kg (161 lb)
- Spike: 315 cm (124 in)
- Block: 300 cm (120 in)

Volleyball information
- Position: Wing spiker
- Current club: Hyundai Seoul
Honours
Women's volleyball
Representing South Korea
Asian Games
Silver medal – second place	1998 Bangkok	Team
Silver medal – second place	2002 Busan	Team

Korean name
- Hangul: 구민정
- RR: Gu Minjeong
- MR: Ku Minjŏng

Ku Min-jung (Korean: 구민정; born August 25, 1973, in Jeollabuk-do) is a retired South Korean volleyball player. She represented South Korea in two editions of the Olympic Games (2000 and 2004), and also often played as an outside hitter and attacker. Ku was also a member of the South Korea women's national volleyball team who attained a great success in the late 1990s and early 2000s, capturing two silver medals each at the Asian Men's Volleyball Championship (1993 and 1997) and at the Asian Games (1998 and 2002).

Ku made her official debut at the 2000 Summer Olympics in Sydney, where she competed as a member of the South Korean squad in the women's volleyball tournament. Collecting a total of three triumphs, two losses, and eight classification points in the preliminary pool, the South Koreans lost the quarterfinal match to the U.S. squad, led by Kerri Walsh (who later turned into a beach volleyball player in the next three Olympics), with a five-score set of 24–26, 25–17, 23–25, 27–25, 14–16. During the fifth round of the match, Ku returned a ball down the left line that was called out and ended into a protest against the aggressive Americans. After suffering a heavy defeat in the quarterfinals, the South Korean squad finished eighth in a classification round match against Croatia with a set score of 1–3.

When South Korea hosted the 2002 Asian Games in Busan, Ku helped the South Koreans capture the silver medal in a final match against China with a set score of 1–3.

At the 2004 Summer Olympics in Athens, Ku qualified for the second time as a member and captain of the South Korean squad in the women's volleyball tournament after receiving an automatic berth from the Asian Championships. Unable to improve a fair performance from Sydney, she and the rest of the South Korean team were defeated in the quarterfinal match against Russia with a unanimous set score of 0–3 (17–25, 15–25, 22–25). Ku was also appointed as the flag bearer for Korea, along with former basketball coach Kim Sung-Ho, under a joint march in the opening ceremony.
