= 1997 FIVB Volleyball Women's World Grand Champions Cup =

1997 World Grand Champions Cup
Tournament details
- Host country: Japan
- Dates: November 14–23
- Teams: 6
- Venues: 3 (in 3 host cities)

Final positions
- Champions: Russia (1st title)

Tournament awards
- MVP: Yevgeniya Artamonova

The Second Volleyball World Grand Champions Cup women's volleyball was held in Japan at 14 to 23 November 1997.

== Teams ==
Team	Qualified as
Japan	Host Nation
China	1997 Asian Champions
Cuba	1997 NORCECA Champions
Brazil	1997 South American Champions
Russia	1997 European Champions
South Korea	Wild Card

== Competition formula ==
The competition formula of the 1997 Women's World Grand Champions Cup is the single Round-Robin system. Each team plays once against each of the 5 remaining teams. Points are accumulated during the whole tournament, and the final standing is determined by the total points gained.

== Venues ==
- Osaka-jō Hall (Osaka)
- Hiroshima Green Arena (Hiroshima)
- Yoyogi National Gymnasium (Tokyo)

== Results ==
Pos	Team	Pld	W	L	Pts	SW	SL	SR	SPW	SPL	SPR
1	Russia	5	5	0	10	15	3	5.000	266	165	1.612
2	Cuba	5	4	1	9	13	6	2.167	253	213	1.188
3	Brazil	5	3	2	8	12	6	2.000	235	183	1.284
4	China	5	2	3	7	8	10	0.800	191	218	0.876
5	Japan	5	1	4	6	4	13	0.308	191	248	0.770
6	South Korea	5	0	5	5	1	15	0.067	130	239	0.544

=== Osaka round ===
Date	Time		Score		Set 1	Set 2	Set 3	Set 4	Set 5	Total
14 Nov	13:00	Brazil	1–3	Cuba	13–15	8–15	15–12	9–15		45–57
14 Nov	15:00	Russia	3–0	China	15–5	15–7	15–3			45–15
14 Nov	18:15	Japan	3–1	South Korea	15–12	15–7	13–15	15–10		58–44
16 Nov	12:30	South Korea	0–3	Brazil	14–16	4–15	3–15			21–46
16 Nov	14:30	Russia	3–0	Japan	15–3	15–7	27–25			57–35
16 Nov	16:30	China	2–3	Cuba	15–9	15–11	7–15	8–15	10–15	55–65

=== Hiroshima round ===
Date	Time		Score		Set 1	Set 2	Set 3	Set 4	Set 5	Total
18 Nov	14:00	Cuba	3–0	South Korea	15–8	15–10	15–2			45–20
18 Nov	16:00	Brazil	2–3	Russia	15–7	7–15	15–9	7–15	10–15	54–61
18 Nov	18:30	Japan	1–3	China	4–15	15–10	13–15	8–15		40–55

=== Tokyo round ===
Date	Time		Score		Set 1	Set 2	Set 3	Set 4	Set 5	Total
21 Nov	14:00	Russia	3–1	Cuba	15–9	13–15	15–6	15–9		58–39
21 Nov	16:00	China	3–0	South Korea	15–6	15–12	15–5			45–23
21 Nov	18:30	Japan	0–3	Brazil	13–15	1–15	9–15			23–45
23 Nov	13:00	Cuba	3–0	Japan	15–7	15–13	17–15			47–35
23 Nov	15:00	South Korea	0–3	Russia	6–15	11–15	5–15			22–45
23 Nov	17:00	Brazil	3–0	China	15–6	15–6	15–9			45–21

== Final standing ==
Rank	Team
1st place, gold medalist(s)	Russia
2nd place, silver medalist(s)	Cuba
3rd place, bronze medalist(s)	Brazil
4	China
5	Japan
6	South Korea

1997 FIVB Women's World Grand Champions Cup champions

Russia
First title

Team Roster
Yelena Vasilevskaya, Natalya Morozova, Yelena Batukhtina, Yelena Godina, Yevgeniya Artamonova, Olga Chukanova, Tatyana Gracheva, Elizaveta Tishchenko, Anastasiya Belikova, Natalya Safronova, Anna Artamonova, Irina Tebenikhina

Head Coach: Nikolay Karpol

== Awards ==
- MVP: (Russia) Yevgeniya Artamonova
- Best scorer: (Russia) Yevgeniya Artamonova
- Best spiker: (Cuba) Regla Bell
- Best blocker: (Russia) Anastasiya Belikova
- Best server: (Russia) Natalya Morozova
- Best digger: (Japan) Hiroko Tsukumo
- Best setter: (Cuba) Taismary Agüero
- Best receiver: (Russia) Yelena Batukhtina
