= Hiroko Tsukumo =

Japanese volleyball player (born 1970)

Personal information
- Born: 11 September 1970 (age 56); Hiroshima, Hiroshima, Japan
- Height: 1.75 m (5 ft 9 in)

Volleyball information
- Position: Libero
- Number: 3

National team
1997-2000	Japan
Honours
Women's volleyball
Representing Japan
Asian Games
Bronze medal – third place	1998 Bangkok	Team

Hiroko Tsukumo (born 11 September 1970) is a retired volleyball player from Japan, who competed for the Japan women's national team in the 1990s. She was named Best Digger and Best Receiver at the 1998 FIVB World Championship. Tsukumo played as a libero.

== Individual awards ==
- 1998 World Championship "Best Digger"
- 1998 World Championship "Best Receiver"
- 1999 FIVB World Cup "Best Digger"
