= Irina Tebenikhina =

Russian volleyball player (born 1978)

Personal information
- Full name: Irina Viktorovna Tebenikhina
- Born: 5 December 1978 (age 47); Fargona, Uzbekistan
- Height: 1.89 m (6 ft 2 in)
Honours
Women's volleyball
Representing Russia
Olympic Games
Silver medal – second place	2004 Athens	Team
World Championship
Bronze medal – third place	1998 Japan	Team
FIVB World Cup
Silver medal – second place	1999 Japan	Team

Irina Tebenikhina (born 5 December 1978, in Fergana) is a volleyball player from Russia, who represented her native country at the 2004 Summer Olympics in Athens, Greece. There she won the silver medal with the Women's National Team, for which she made her debut in 1997.

== Honours ==
- 1997 FIVB World Grand Prix — 1st place
- 1997 European Championship — 1st place
- 1998 World Championship — 3rd place
- 1998 FIVB World Grand Prix — 2nd place
- 1999 FIVB World Grand Prix — 1st place
- 2003 FIVB World Grand Prix — 2nd place
- 2004 Olympic Games — 2nd place
