= Hitomi Mitsunaga =

Japanese volleyball player (born 1976)

Personal information
- Nationality: Japanese
- Born: 3 June 1976 (age 50)
- Height: 1.80 m (5 ft 11 in)
- Spike: 3.15 m (124 in)
- Block: 2.93 m (115 in)

Volleyball information
- Position: Outside hitter
- Number: 11 (national team)

National team
- Years: Team
- 1998-2000: Japan
Honours
Women's volleyball
Representing Japan
Asian Games
Bronze medal – third place	1998 Bangkok	Team

Hitomi Mitsunaga (満永 ひとみ, Mitsunaga Hitomi; born 3 June 1976) is a retired Japanese female volleyball player.

She was part of the Japan women's national volleyball team at the 1998 FIVB World Championship in Japan.
