= Marijana Ribičić =

Croatian volleyball player (born 1979)

Personal information
- Nationality: Croatian
- Born: 21 February 1979 (age 47)
- Height: 1.86 m (6 ft 1 in)
- Weight: 74 kg (163 lb)

National team
| 2000 | Croatia |

Marijana Ribičić (born 21 February 1979) is a Croatian former volleyball player. She was part of the Croatia women's national volleyball team.

She competed with the national team at the 2000 Summer Olympics in Sydney, Australia, finishing 7th.

== See also ==
- Croatia at the 2000 Summer Olympics
