= Volleyball at the 1998 Asian Games – Women's tournament =

Women at the 1998 Asian Games
- Venue: Impact Arena
- Date: 7–15 December 1998
- Nations: 6

Medalists
gold medal	China
silver medal	South Korea
bronze medal	Japan

This page presents the results of the women's volleyball tournament at the 1998 Asian Games, which was held from December 7 to December 15, 1998 in Bangkok, Thailand. The women's volleyball event was contested for the tenth time at the Asian Games.

== Results ==
=== Preliminary round ===
==== Pool A ====
Pos	Team	Pld	W	L	Pts	SW	SL	SR	SPW	SPL	SPR	Qualification
1	Japan	2	2	0	4	6	0	MAX	90	25	3.600	Semifinals
2	Thailand	2	1	1	3	3	3	1.000	57	69	0.826	Semifinals
3	Kazakhstan	2	0	2	2	0	6	0.000	37	90	0.411	Classification 5th–6th

Source: Results

Date		Score		Set 1	Set 2	Set 3	Set 4	Set 5	Total
07 Dec	Japan	3–0	Kazakhstan	15–4	15–4	15–5			45–13
08 Dec	Thailand	0–3	Japan	3–15	2–15	7–15			12–45
11 Dec	Kazakhstan	0–3	Thailand	11–15	3–15	10–15			24–45

==== Pool B ====
Pos	Team	Pld	W	L	Pts	SW	SL	SR	SPW	SPL	SPR	Qualification
1	China	2	2	0	4	6	1	6.000	97	55	1.764	Semifinals
2	South Korea	2	1	1	3	4	3	1.333	87	61	1.426	Semifinals
3	Chinese Taipei	2	0	2	2	0	6	0.000	22	90	0.244	Classification 5th–6th

Source: Results

Date		Score		Set 1	Set 2	Set 3	Set 4	Set 5	Total
07 Dec	South Korea	3–0	Chinese Taipei	15–1	15–2	15–6			45–9
09 Dec	Chinese Taipei	0–3	China	6–15	2–15	5–15			13–45
11 Dec	China	3–1	South Korea	6–15	16–14	15–5	15–8		52–42

=== Classification 5th–6th ===
Date		Score		Set 1	Set 2	Set 3	Set 4	Set 5	Total
14 Dec	Kazakhstan	0–3	Chinese Taipei	6–15	9–15	6–15			21–45

=== Final round ===
Semifinals
13 December
Japan	0
South Korea	3
13 December
China	3
Thailand	0

Final
15 December
South Korea	1
China	3
Bronze medal match
15 December
Japan	3
Thailand	0

==== Semifinals ====
Date		Score		Set 1	Set 2	Set 3	Set 4	Set 5	Total
13 Dec	Japan	0–3	South Korea	14–16	6–15	7–15			27–46
13 Dec	China	3–0	Thailand	15–4	15–2	15–2			45–8

==== Bronze medal match ====
Date		Score		Set 1	Set 2	Set 3	Set 4	Set 5	Total
15 Dec	Japan	3–0	Thailand	15–6	15–6	15–3			45–15

==== Final ====
Date		Score		Set 1	Set 2	Set 3	Set 4	Set 5	Total
15 Dec	South Korea	1–3	China	6–15	15–13	8–15	13–15		42–58

== Final standing ==
Rank	Team	Pld	W	L
1st place, gold medalist(s)	China	4	4	0
2nd place, silver medalist(s)	South Korea	4	2	2
3rd place, bronze medalist(s)	Japan	4	3	1
4	Thailand	4	1	3
5	Chinese Taipei	3	1	2
6	Kazakhstan	3	0	3
