= 2002 FIVB Women's Volleyball World Championship squads =

This article shows the rosters of all participating teams at the 2002 FIVB Women's Volleyball World Championship in Germany.

== Pool A ==
=== Bulgaria ===
Name	Nr.	Height	Date of birth	Position	Club
Lyubka Debarlieva	7	1.78 m	21 September 1980	setter	Levski Sofia
Aneta Germanova	13	1.86 m	3 January 1975	wing spiker	Romanelli Florenz
Iliyana Gocheva	14	1.88 m	2 November 1976	middle blocker	Levski Sofia
Elena Koleva	17	1.86 m	1 December 1977	opposite	Levski Sofia
Elena Kunova	11	1.87 m	5 November 1975	middle blocker	Rote Raben Vilsbiburg
Marina Marik	2	1.80 m	17 August 1969	liberor	Levski Sofia
Neli Marinova	6	1.73 m	27 May 1971	setter	Romanelli Florenz
Slavka Ouzounova-Dimitrova	8	1.84 m	30 July 1971	wing spiker	Zaon Athen
Iliana Petkova	18	1.90 m	10 November 1977	middle blocker	ZSKA Sofia
Vania Sokolova	4	1.89 m	22 June 1971	middle blocker	Rapid Bukarest
Radosveta Teneva	10	1.83 m	21 November 1980	wing spiker	AIAS Evousmos
Antonina Zetova	5	1.89 m	7 September 1973	universal	Volley Modena
Trainer: Stefan Panchew, Bulgaria; Co-Trainer: Angel Koshedzhiyski, Bulgaria

=== Germany ===
Name	Nr.	Height	Date of birth	Position	Club
Atika Bouagaa	11	1.82 m	22 May 1982	wing spiker	USC Münster
Béatrice Dömeland	2	1.80 m	4 August 1973	setter	Dresdner SC
Angelina Grün	15	1.85 m	2 December 1979	wing spiker	Volley Modena
Tanja Hart	3	1.76 m	24 January 1974	setter	SSV Ulm Aliud Pharma
Olessya Kulakova	12	1.90 m	31 January 1977	middle blocker	RC Cannes
Jana Müller	10	1.84 m	24 May 1978	wing spiker	Schweriner SC
Kathy Radzuweit	14	1.96 m	2 March 1982	middle blocker	Bayer 04 Leverkusen
Sylvia Roll	5	1.80 m	29 May 1973	wing spiker	Monte Schiavo Jesi
Judith Sylvester	16	1.93 m	13 October 1977	opposite	Bayer 04 Leverkusen
Birgit Thumm	17	1.84 m	3 July 1980	middle blocker	USC Münster
Kerstin Tzscherlich	4	1.79 m	15 February 1978	liberor	Dresdner SC
Verena Veh	18	1.93 m	4 November 1977	middle blocker	SSV Ulm Aliud Pharma
Trainer: Lee Hee-wan, * 15. Januar 1956, South Korea; Co-Trainer: Christian Zeyfang, * 1967, Germany

=== Italy ===
Name	Nr.	Height	Date of birth	Position	Club
Sara Anzanello	5	1.93 m	30 July 1980	middle blocker	Asystel Volley
Valentina Borrelli	15	1.90 m	30 October 1978	wing spiker	Johnson Spezzano
Paola Cardullo	17	1.62 m	18 March 1982	liberor	Asystel Volley
Manuela Leggeri	4	1.83 m	9 May 1976	middle blocker	Volley Modena
Eleonora Lo Bianco	14	1.72 m	22 December 1979	setter	Starfin Ravenna
Anna Vania Mello	16	1.83 m	27 February 1979	middle blocker	Foppapedretti Bergamo
Darina Mifkova	11	1.85 m	24 May 1974	wing spiker	Minetti Vicenza
Paola Paggi	10	1.82 m	6 December 1976	middle blocker	Minetti Vicenza
Francesca Piccinini	12	1.80 m	10 January 1979	wing spiker	Foppapedretti Bergamo
Simona Rinieri	2	1.88 m	1 September 1977	wing spiker	Starfin Ravenna
Rachele Sangiuliano	13	1.82 m	23 June 1981	setter	Icot Volley Forlì
Elisa Togut	3	1.92 m	14 May 1978	opposite	Minetti Vicenza
Trainer: Marco Bonitta, * 5. September 1963, Italy; Co-Trainer: Marco Mencarelli, Italy

=== Japan ===
Name	Nr.	Height	Date of birth	Position	Club
Makiko Horai	12	1.87 m	6 January 1979	wing spiker	JT Marvelous
Sachiko Kodama	9	1.71 m	15 September 1978	setter	Toray Arrows
Chikako Kumamae	2	1.80 m	11 April 1974	wing spiker	Toray Arrows
Hisako Mukai	8	1.77 m	1 March 1978	wing spiker	Toray Arrows
Kanako Naito	3	1.82 m	4 November 1984	middle blocker	Takefuji Bamboo
Minako Onuki	1	1.73 m	15 October 1972	wing spiker	NEC Red Rockets
Ai Otomo	15	1.83 m	24 March 1982	middle blocker	NEC Red Rockets
Kana Oyama	7	1.87 m	19 June 1984	wing spiker	Seitoku Gakuen
Yuko Sano	13	1.58 m	26 July 1979	liberor	Toray Arrows
Sachiko Sugiyama	14	1.83 m	19 October 1979	middle blocker	NEC Red Rockets
Miyuki Takahashi	11	1.70 m	25 December 1978	wing spiker	NEC Red Rockets
Shinako Tanaka	5	1.72 m	28 July 1975	wing spiker	NEC Red Rockets
Trainer: Masahiro Yoshikawa, * 21. Januar 1963, Japan; Co-Trainer: Akinori Yamada, Japan

=== Mexico ===
Name	Nr.	Height	Date of birth	Position	Club
Selena Barajas	4	1.82 m	22 January 1982	setter	UANL Tigres
Bibiana Candelas	10	1.94 m	2 December 1983	middle blocker	Coahuila
Blanca Chan	11	1.82 m	26 July 1981	wing spiker	Sinaloa
Celida Cordova	3	1.74 m	1 August 1980	liberor	Monterrey
Yendy Cortinas	1	1.85 m	4 July 1972	universal	Club Voleibol Benidorm
Paola Estrada	17	1.71 m	10 February 1975	liberor	Distrito Federal
Marion Frias	15	1.90 m	15 January 1982	middle blocker	Distrito Federal
Marcia Gonzalez	8	1.74 m	10 February 1975	setter	UNAM
Mariana Lopez	13	1.78 m	30 August 1985	setter	Distrito Federal
Kenia Olvera	5	1.85 m	6 May 1975	middle blocker	UNAM
Claudia Rodriguez	12	1.90 m	10 August 1980	middle blocker	UNAM
Migdalel Ruiz	6	1.80 m	3 March 1983	wing spiker	Guanajuato
Trainer: Sergio Hernández Herrera, Mexico; Co-Trainer: Jorge Azair, Mexico

=== Czech Republic ===
Name	Nr.	Height	Date of birth	Position	Club
Katerina Buckova	8	1.90 m	28 April 1978	middle blocker	RC Cannes
Lenka Felbabova	14	1.73 m	18 April 1978	liberor	PVK Olymp Prag
Jana Havlova	11	1.80 m	27 May 1978	wing spiker	PVK Olymp Prag
Helena Horka	2	1.88 m	15 June 1981	wing spiker	VK Královo Pole Brünn
Katerina Jenckova	9	1.86 m	18 May 1971	wing spiker	PSG Athen
Jana Kalcikova	17	1.92 m	22 January 1980	middle blocker	PVK Olymp Prag
Petra Novotná	12	1.87 m	10 April 1981	universal	PVK Olymp Prag
Marcela Ritschelova	7	1.92 m	9 October 1972	middle blocker	Pallavolo Palermo
Jana Senkova	15	1.82 m	11 July 1982	universal	SK UP Olmütz
Jana Simankova	5	1.79 m	6 April 1980	setter	VK Královo Pole Brünn
Milada Spalova	4	1.89 m	16 November 1979	middle blocker	SK UP Olmütz
Eva Štěpánčíková	6	1.80 m	11 December 1972	setter	Pallavolo Palermo
Trainer: Stanislav Mitac, Czech Republic; Co-Trainer: David Zahradnik, Czech Republic

== Pool B ==
=== Egypt ===
Name	Nr.	Height	Date of birth	Position	Club
Miral Abdelkader	4	1.78 m	16 November 1983	setter	Al-Ahly Kairo
Mona Badawy	16	1.82 m	16 January 1982	wing spiker	Al-Ahly Kairo
Samar Ebeid	6	1.80 m	17 October 1985	middle blocker	El Shams Kairo
Nouran Elmagghauri	14	1.75 m	30 September 1985	wing spiker	Al-Ahly Kairo
Rasha Elsayed	7	1.74 m	4 February 1981	liberor	Zamalek SC
Amina Fouad	3	1.86 m	10 April 1980	middle blocker	Al-Ahly Kairo
Nagwa Fouad	5	1.72 m	12 August 1983	middle blocker	Sporting Alexandria
Ingy Hamdy	10	1.76 m	6 June 1986	middle blocker	El Shams Kairo
Heba Rabie	13	1.73 m	14 February 1983	middle blocker	Al-Ahly Kairo
Sherihan Sameh	1	1.81 m	25 September 1986	wing spiker	Al-Ahly Kairo
Sara Talaat	12	1.70 m	1 September 1982	liberor	Al-Ahly Kairo
Tahani Tosson	11	1.77 m	22 September 1971	wing spiker	Al-Ahly Kairo
Trainer: Hesham Badrawy, Egypt; Co-Trainer: Atef Hussein, Egypt

=== Canada ===
Name	Nr.	Height	Date of birth	Position	Club
Barb Bellini	7	1.85 m	14 March 1977	wing spiker	Criollas de Caguas
Kimberly Exner	8	1.86 m	16 July 1977	wing spiker	National Team
Janis Kelly	16	1.75 m	20 March 1971	wing spiker	DAM La Rochette
Krista Lee Kinsman	5	1.86 m	2 January 1978	wing spiker	National Team
Anne-Marie Lemieux	6	1.78 m	23 July 1976	setter	National Team
Annie Levesque	15	1.64 m	9 September 1979	liberor	Université de Sherbrooke
Rae-Anne Mitchell	13	1.88 m	18 March 1973	middle blocker	St. Cloud Suresnes
Miroslava Pribylova	9	1.78 m	15 August 1970	setter	SSV Ulm Aliud Pharma
Jennifer Rauh	11	1.82 m	1 July 1971	wing spiker	Herentals VBC
Melissa Raymond	14	1.87 m	27 August 1980	middle blocker	Université de Sherbrooke
Joanne Ross	10	1.96 m	1 November 1977	middle blocker	National Team
Amy Nicole Tutt	3	1.82 m	25 April 1976	wing spiker	Club Voleibol Benidorm
Trainer: Lorne Sawula, Canada; Co-Trainer: Naoki Miyashita, Japan

=== Cuba ===
Name	Nr.	Height	Date of birth	Position	Club
Zoila Barros Fernández	18	1.88 m	6 August 1979	middle blocker	Ciudad Deportiva La Habana
Rosir Calderón Díaz	12	1.91 m	28 December 1984	wing spiker	Ciudad Deportiva La Habana
Nancy Carrillo	3	1.90 m	11 January 1986	middle blocker	Ciudad Deportiva La Habana
Liana Mesa Luaces	11	1.79 m	26 December 1977	wing spiker	Camagüey
Indira Mestre	9	1.83 m	21 April 1979	wing spiker	Ciudad Deportiva La Habana
Anniara Muñoz Carrazana	13	1.80 m	24 January 1980	universal	Cienfuegos
Yoslan Muñoz	7	1.83 m	19 February 1980		Ciudad Deportiva La Habana
Yaima Ortiz Charro	8	1.79 m	9 November 1981	liberor	Ciudad Deportiva La Habana
Yumilka Ruiz	1	1.79 m	8 May 1978	wing spiker	Camagüey
Marta Sánchez Salfran	17	1.82 m	17 May 1973	wing spiker	Holguín
Yanelis Santos Allegne	2	1.83 m	30 March 1986	opposite	Ciego de Ávila
Regla Torres	10	1.91 m	12 February 1975	middle blocker	Ciudad Deportiva La Habana
Trainer: Luis Felipe Calderón, Cuba; Co-Trainer: Eugenio George, Cuba

=== Netherlands ===
Name	Nr.	Height	Date of birth	Position	Club
Alice Blom	8	1.78 m	7 April 1980	universal	Arke Pollux Oldenzaal
Irina Donets	10	1.86 m	20 August 1976	middle blocker	Pallavolo Ravenna
Riëtte Fledderus	14	1.68 m	18 October 1977	setter	Monte Schiavo Jesi
Manon Flier	12	1.90 m	8 February 1984	wing spiker	Arke Pollux Oldenzaal
Ruth Heerschap	11	1.91 m	6 January 1978	middle blocker	AMVJ Amstelveen
Francien Huurman	3	1.92 m	18 April 1975	middle blocker	Famila Imola
Elles Leferink	6	1.76 m	14 November 1976	wing spiker	SSV Ulm Aliud Pharma
Maureen Staal	17	1.88 m	30 September 1982	wing spiker	Vanilla VC Weert
Kim Staelens	1	1.82 m	7 January 1982	Z	USSP Albi Volley-Ball
Janneke van Tienen	5	1.72 m	29 May 1979	liberor	Vanilla VC Weert
Ingrid Visser	15	1.88 m	4 June 1977	middle blocker	Hotel Cantur Las Palmas
Elke Wijnhoven	7	1.68 m	3 January 1981	liberor	Metodo Minetti Vicenza
Trainer: Angelo Frigoni, * 17 March 1954, Italy; Co-Trainer: Han Abbing, * 7 January 1961. Netherlands

=== Romania ===
Name	Nr.	Height	Date of birth	Position	Club
Alina-Speranta Albu	16	1.86 m	6 September 1983	middle blocker	Dinamo București
Elena Butnaru	2	1.83 m	27 April 1975	middle blocker	Pallavolo Palermo
Maria-Eugenia Chivorchian	12	1.81 m	27 August 1982	universal	Amici Bacău
Andreea-Florina Constantinescu	9	1.81 m	14 June 1977		VC Unic Piatra Neamţ
Mirela Corjeutanu	10	1.90 m	6 July 1977	universal	Futura Volley Sanarate
Carmen-Alida Marcovici	5	1.90 m	20 March 1973	middle blocker	Boavista Porto
Florentina Nedelcu	17	1.77 m	26 March 1976	wing spiker	VC Unic Piatra Neamţ
Cristina-Lucretia Parv	11	1.81 m	29 June 1972	wing spiker	Minas Tênis Clube
Anca Popescu	15	1.82 m	21 February 1976	middle blocker	TV Fischbek
Nicoleta Tolisteanu	18	1.75 m	3 December 1980	liberor	Amici Bacău
Luminita-Gabriela Trombitas	3	1.82 m	5 July 1971	setter	Petrarca Padua
Carmen Turlea	1	1.83 m	18 November 1975	opposite	Foppapedretti Bergamo
Trainer: Costinel Stan, * 25. Oktober 1953, Romania; Co-Trainer: Aurel Cazacu, Romania

=== South Korea ===
Name	Nr.	Height	Date of birth	Position	Club
Chang So-yun	15	1.84 m	11 November 1974	middle blocker	Hyundai Engineering & Construction
Choi Kwang-hee	6	1.74 m	25 May 1974	wing spiker	Korea Tobacco & Ginseng
Chung Sun-hye	9	1.74 m	17 December 1975	middle blocker	LG Caltex Oil
Han Yoo-mi	17	1.79 m	5 February 1982	wing spiker	Hyundai Engineering & Construction
Jung Dae-young	16	1.83 m	12 August 1981	middle blocker	Hyundai Engineering & Construction
Kang Hye-mi	3	1.72 m	27 April 1974	setter	Hyundai Engineering & Construction
Kim Mi-jin	13	1.82 m	22 July 1979	middle blocker	Korea Expressway Corporation
Kim Sa-nee	5	1.80 m	21 June 1981	setter	Korea Expressway Corporation
Koo Ki-lan	8	1.70 m	10 March 1977	liberor	Heungkuk Life Insurance
Ku Min-jung	4	1.82 m	25 August 1973	wing spiker	Hyundai Engineering & Construction
Lee Meong-hee	11	1.75 m	7 April 1978	wing spiker	Hyundai Engineering & Construction
Park Mee-kyung	7	1.81 m	13 May 1975	wing spiker	Korea Expressway Corporation
Trainer: Ryu Hoa-suk, South Korea; Co-Trainer: Eo Chang-sun, South Korea

== Pool C ==
=== Argentina ===
Name	Nr.	Height	Date of birth	Position	Club
Mirna Eugenia Ansaldi	14	1.85 m	10 July 1977	wing spiker	Gimnasia y Esgrima de Rosario
Julietta Borghi	10	1.90 m	6 May 1982	middle blocker	Banco Nación
Natalia Brussa	8	1.85 m	13 February 1985	middle blocker	Central San Carlos
Mariana Conde	3	1.83 m	23 July 1973	wing spiker	Volley 2000 Spezzano
Carolina Costagrande	2	1.87 m	15 October 1980	wing spiker	Monte Schiavo Jesi
Celina Crusoe	1	1.74 m	22 September 1974	setter	Pallavolo Reggio Emilia
Romina Lamas	4	1.85 m	29 August 1978	setter	CV Teneriffa
Ivana Eloisa Müller	6	1.85 m	7 March 1974	middle blocker	Banco Nación
Georgina Pinedo	16	1.76 m	30 May 1981	wing spiker	CA Boca Juniors
Marianela Robinet	12	1.70 m	24 November 1983	wing spiker	Central San Carlos
María Vincente	7	1.72 m	25 November 1977	wing spiker	DAM La Rochette
Micaela Vogel	5	1.85 m	12 January 1984	middle blocker	GEBA
Trainer: Claudio Cuello, Italy; Co-Trainer: Alejandro Grossi, Argentina

=== Dominican Republic ===
Name	Nr.	Height	Date of birth	Position	Club
Nurys Arias Doñe	9	1.92 m	20 May 1978	wing spiker	CDC Mirador
Yudelkys Bautista	3	1.93 m	5 December 1977	middle blocker	CDC Mirador
Milagros Cabral	10	1.85 m	17 October 1978	wing spiker	Los Cachorros
Evelyn Carrera Pichardo	5	1.82 m	5 October 1971	liberor	Los Prados
Francisca Duarte	13	1.88 m	4 November 1979	universal	CDC Mirador
Karla Echenique Quiñones	18	1.79 m	16 May 1987	setter	Deportivo Nacional
Francia Jackson Cabrera	12	1.68 m	8 November 1975	Z	CDC Mirador
Kenia Moreta Perez	16	1.93 m	4 July 1984	universal	CDC Mirador
Yndys Novas	8	1.86 m	7 November 1977	wing spiker	CDC Mirador
Cosiri Rodriguez Andino	15	1.90 m	30 August 1977	universal	San Cristobal
Lucy Suazo Perez	6	1.73 m	16 August 1981	universal	Los Cachorros
Annerys Vargas	7	1.94 m	7 August 1982	middle blocker	Modeca
Trainer: Jorge Pérez Vento, * 28. September 1947, Cuba; Co-Trainer: Wilson Sanchez, * 1. Juli 1977, Dominican Republic

=== Kenya ===
Name	Nr.	Height	Date of birth	Position	Club
Violet Barasa	14	1.75 m	21 June 1975	wing spiker	Vileo
Lucy Chege	7	1.69 m	15 November 1976	middle blocker	Kenya Pipeline
Leonidas Kamende	13	1.82 m	28 August 1979	wing spiker	Kenya Pipeline
Abigael Kipkemboi	5	1.76 m	26 August 1981	middle blocker	Kenya Pipeline
Rodah Lyali	3	1.66 m	12 September 1984	setter	Kenya Pipeline
Margaret Mukoya	2	1.53 m	28 August 1973	middle blocker	Telkom Kenya
Dorcas Nakhomicha	9	1.73 m	31 March 1971	wing spiker	Telkom Kenya
Philister Sang	1	1.85 m	12 September 1984	wing spiker	Kenya Pipeline
Salome Wanjala	10	1.69 m	20 April 1985	wing spiker	Kenya Commercial Bank
Catherine Wanjiru	6	1.78 m	7 August 1978	wing spiker	Kenya Pipeline
Nancy Waswa	16	1.73 m	28 December 1971	wing spiker	Telkom Kenya
Mercy Wesutila	17	1.53 m	8 March 1976	liberor	Kenya Pipeline
Trainer: Gilbert Ohanya, Kenya; Co-Trainer: Paul Gitau, Kenya

=== Puerto Rico ===
Name	Nr.	Height	Date of birth	Position	Club
Dariam Acevedo	13	1.68 m	15 December 1984	wing spiker	Chicas de San Juan
Aurea Cruz	9	1.83 m	10 January 1982	wing spiker	Llaneras de Toa Baja
Eva Cruz	8	1.83 m	22 January 1974	wing spiker	Mets de Guaynabo
Jetzabel del Valle	18	1.85 m	19 December 1979	middle blocker	Criollas de Caguas
Tatiana Encarnación	2	1.83 m	28 July 1985	wing spiker	Criollas de Caguas
Lourdes Isern	1	1.68 m	15 September 1978	liberor	Vaqueras de Bayamón
Dolly Melendez	7	1.78 m	16 April 1984	universal	Criollas de Caguas
Vilmarie Mojica	3	1.78 m	13 August 1985	setter	Pinkin de Corozal
Xiomara Molero	12	1.73 m	23 April 1971	setter	Criollas de Caguas
Karina Ocasio	11	1.88 m	1 August 1985	middle blocker	Mets de Guaynabo
Sheila Ocasio	17	1.91 m	17 November 1982	middle blocker	Mets de Guaynabo
Yarleen Santiago	6	1.83 m	18 January 1978	wing spiker	Gigantes de Carolina
Trainer: David Alemán, Puerto Rico; Co-Trainer: Saturnino Angulo, Puerto Rico

=== Russia ===
Name	Nr.	Height	Date of birth	Position	Club
Jewgenija Wiktorowna Artamonowa	8	1.90 m	17 July 1975	wing spiker	VK Uralotschka-NTMK
Anastassija Alexandrowna Belikowa	3	1.90 m	22 July 1979	universal	VK Uralotschka-NTMK
Jekaterina Alexandrowna Gamowa	11	2,05 m	17 October 1980	universal	VK Uralotschka-NTMK
Jelena Michailowna Godina	6	1.92 m	17 September 1977	wing spiker	VK Uralotschka-NTMK
Tatiana Gorchkova	1	1.98 m	8 March 1981	wing spiker	VK Uralotschka-NTMK
Anjela Gourieva	15	1.95 m	2 September 1980	universal	VK Uralotschka-NTMK
Tatjana Alexandrowna Gratschowa	12	1.80 m	23 February 1973	setter	VK Uralotschka-NTMK
Jelena Michailowna Plotnikowa	14	1.85 m	26 July 1978	universal	VK Uralotschka-NTMK
Natalja Andrejewna Safronowa	7	1.88 m	6 February 1979	universal	VK Uralotschka-NTMK
Olga Tchoukanova	17	1.81 m	9 June 1980	universal	VK Uralotschka-NTMK
Jelisaweta Iwanowna Tischtschenko	9	1.90 m	7 February 1975	middle blocker	VK Uralotschka-NTMK
Jelena Nikolajewna Tjurina	4	1.84 m	12 April 1971	liberor	VK Uralotschka-NTMK
Trainer: Nikolai Karpol, * 1 May 1938, Russia; Co-Trainerin: Walentina Ogijenko, Russia

=== United States ===
Name	Nr.	Height	Date of birth	Position	Club
Elisabeth Bachman	6	1.93 m	7 November 1978	middle blocker	Minnesota Chill
Heather Bown	7	1.88 m	29 November 1978	middle blocker	Olympia Teodora
Tara Cross-Battle	13	1.80 m	16 September 1968	outside hitter	Foppapedretti Bergamo
Elizabeth Fitzgerald	8	1.83 m	15 July 1980	setter	National Team
Jennifer Flynn	12	1.75 m	26 July 1978	setter	National Team
Tayyiba Haneef	3	2,01 m	23 March 1979	opposite hitter	National Team
Nancy Metcalf	18	1.86 m	12 November 1978	opposite hitter	Indias de Mayaguez
Sarah Noriega	16	1.87 m	24 April 1976	opposite hitter	Romanelli Florenz
Prikeba Phipps	1	1.90 m	30 June 1969	outside hitter	Foppapedretti Bergamo
Danielle Scott	2	1.88 m	1 October 1972	middle blocker	Pioneer Red Wings
Stacy Sykora	5	1.76 m	24 June 1977	libero	Olympia Teodora
Logan Tom	15	1.86 m	25 May 1981	outside hitter	Stanford University
Trainer: Toshiaki Yoshida, Japan; Co-Trainer: Kevin Hambly, United States

== Pool D ==
=== Australia ===
Name	Nr.	Height	Date of birth	Position	Club
Tamsin Barnett	11	1.93 m	10 March 1980	wing spiker	Schweriner SC
Louise Bawden	14	1.83 m	7 August 1981	setter	AMVJ Amstelveen
Sandra Bowen	8	1.80 m	12 February 1976	wing spiker	Monbulk VC
Majella Brown	3	1.87 m	2 February 1980	universal	CAV Murcia
Jennifer Hiller	6	1.69 m	12 February 1979	liberor	Monash University
Tolotear Lealamanua	9	1.86 m	21 March 1983	middle blocker	University of Technology, Sydney
Adrienne Marie	1	1.82 m	20 November 1972	wing spiker	University of Technology, Sydney
Anna Maycock	4	1.82 m	24 August 1982	setter	Mount Lofty
Christie Mokotupu	7	1.83 m	10 May 1983	wing spiker	Petrarca Padua
Rowena Morgan	13	1.74 m	2 June 1981	liberor	University of Technology, Sydney
Eileen Romanowski	16	1.83 m	3 January 1984	wing spiker	Mount Lofty
Priscilla Ruddle	12	1.83 m	12 July 1976	middle blocker	Monash University
Trainer: Mark Barnard, Australia; Co-Trainerin: Sue Jenkins, Australia

=== Brazil ===
Name	Nr.	Height	Date of birth	Position	Club
Sonia Benedito	9	1.84 m	19 January 1978	wing spiker	Fluminense Rio de Janeiro
Fabiana Berto	14	1.78 m	23 January 1976	setter	Club Atlético Estudiantes de Paraná
Sheilla Castro	3	1.85 m	1 July 1983	wing spiker	Minas Tênis Clube
Marina Daloca	15	1.85 m	8 September 1979	middle blocker	Minas Tênis Clube
Welissa Gonzaga	10	1.80 m	9 September 1982	wing spiker	Club Atlético Estudiantes de Paraná
Valeska Menezes	8	1.80 m	23 April 1976	middle blocker	BCN Osasco
Luciana Nascimento	2	1.89 m	7 June 1980	wing spiker	EC Pinheiros
Fabiana Oliveira	5	1.66 m	7 March 1980	liberor	Fluminense Rio de Janeiro
Paula Pequeno	4	1.84 m	22 January 1982	wing spiker	BCN Osasco
Karin Rodrigues	11	1.87 m	8 November 1971	middle blocker	Fluminense Rio de Janeiro
Marcelle Moraes	16	1.81 m	17 October 1976	setter	BCN Osasco
Arlene Xavier	18	1.77 m	20 December 1969	liberor	BCN Osasco
Trainer: Marco Motta, Brazil; Co-Trainer: Luiz Moura, Brazil

=== China ===
Name	Nr.	Height	Date of birth	Position	Club
Chen Jing	10	1.82 m	3 September 1975	middle blocker	Sichuan Jiuzhaigou Valley
Feng Kun	2	1.83 m	28 December 1978	setter	Peking Yanjing Brewery
Li Shan	6	1.85 m	21 May 1980	middle blocker	Tianjin Bridgestone
Li Ying	13	1.77 m	22 August 1979	libero	Liaoning Huanyu
Liu Yanan	4	1.86 m	29 September 1980	middle blocker	Liaoning Huanyu
Song Nina	12	1.79 m	7 April 1980	setter	Army Keming Surface
Xiong Zi	15	1.81 m	8 November 1976	libero	Sichuan Jiuzhaigou Valley
Yang Hao	3	1.83 m	21 March 1980	wing spiker	Liaoning Huanyu
Zhang Jing	1	1.90 m	14 October 1979	wing spiker	Shanghai
Zhang Yuehong	9	1.82 m	9 November 1975	wing spiker	Liaoning Huanyu
Zhao Ruirui	8	1.96 m	2 November 1981	middle blocker	Army Keming Surface
Zhou Suhong	7	1.82 m	23 April 1979	wing spiker	Zhejiang New Century Tourism
Trainer: Chen Zhonghe, China; Co-Trainer: Zheng Zongyuan, China

=== Greece ===
Name	Nr.	Height	Date of birth	Position	Club
Eleftheria Chatzinikou	9	1.82 m	20 April 1978	setter	EA Larisa
Vaia Dirva	13	1.90 m	22 April 1977	middle blocker	EA Larisa
Maria Gkaragkouni	2	1.80 m	21 December 1975	wing spiker	ZAON Athen
Niki Gkaragkouni	4	1.84 m	12 March 1977	middle blocker	Panathinaikos Athen
Eleni Kiosi	16	1.82 m	29 September 1980	wing spiker	Aias Evosmou
Eleni Memetzi	10	1.82 m	12 January 1975	setter	Filathlitikos Thessaloniki
Vasiliki Papazoglou	11	1.90 m	24 August 1979	wing spiker	Panellinios Athen
Zanna Proniadou	1	1.90 m	13 December 1978	middle blocker	Filathlitikos Thessaloniki
Charikleia Sakkoula	14	1.80 m	18 December 1973	wing spiker	Filathlitikos Thessaloniki
Fidanka Saparefska	5	1.81 m	9 November 1975	middle blocker	Panathinaikos Athen
Tatiana Smyrnidou	18	2,00 m	20 August 1975	universal	Filathlitikos Thessaloniki
Ioanna Vlachou	17	1.70 m	14 May 1981	liberor	Aias Evosmou
Trainer: Dimitrios Floros, Greece; Co-Trainer: Athanasios Strantzalis, Greece

=== Poland ===
Name	Nr.	Height	Date of birth	Position	Club
Natalia Bamber	8	1.87 m	24 February 1982	universal	Gwardia Wrocław
Izabela Belcik	4	1.85 m	29 November 1980	setter	Gedania Gdańsk
Małgorzata Glinka	6	1.90 m	30 September 1978	universal	Minetti Vicenza
Ewa Kowalkowska	2	1.82 m	23 February 1975	wing spiker	Palac Bydgoszcz
Katarzyna Mroczkowska	1	1.81 m	30 December 1980	middle blocker	Palac Bydgoszcz
Anna Podolec	11	1.93 m	30 October 1985	universal	MKS Lancut
Aleksandra Przybysz	16	1.80 m	2 June 1980	wing spiker	Stal Bielsko-Biala
Milena Rosner	9	1.79 m	4 January 1980	universal	Gedania Gdańsk
Magdalena Sliwa	5	1.73 m	17 November 1969	setter	Foppapedretti Bergamo
Dominika Smereka	13	1.74 m	13 January 1974	liberor	Palac Bydgoszcz
Joanna Staniucha	17	1.84 m	5 December 1981	wing spiker	Stal Bielsko-Biala
Joanna Szeszko	3	1.80 m	14 June 1974	universal	SKRA Warszawa
Trainer: Zbigniew Kryzanowski, Poland; Co-Trainer: Stanisław Majkowski, Poland

=== Thailand ===
Name	Nr.	Height	Date of birth	Position	Club
Wanna Buakaew	1	1.70 m	2 January 1981	liberor	Pepsi Bangkok
Wisuta Heebkaew	16	1.75 m	1 February 1980	setter	RBAC Mittraphap
Amporn Hyapha	11	1.79 m	19 May 1985	wing spiker	PTT Bangkok
Wanlapa Jid-ong	13	1.70 m	2 June 1977	setter	Pepsi Bangkok
Piyamas Koijapo	9	1.78 m	23 October 1980	wing spiker	Pepsi Bangkok
Sommai Niyompon	2	1.72 m	28 September 1984	wing spiker	Pepsi Bangkok
Nurak Nokputta	4	1.78 m	31 January 1982	wing spiker	Pepsi Bangkok
Anna Paijinda	3	1.75 m	3 April 1974	wing spiker	Rerothai
Suphap Phongthong	8	1.76 m	16 May 1982	middle blocker	Pepsi Bangkok
Patcharee Sangmuang	14	1.81 m	20 March 1978	wing spiker	PTT Bangkok
Saranya Srisakorn	6	1.75 m	11 May 1975	middle blocker	Aerothai Bangkok
Pleumjit Thinkaow	5	1.79 m	9 November 1983	middle blocker	Pepsi Bangkok
Trainer: Kiattipong Radchatagriengkai, Thailand; Co-Trainer: Danai Sriwatcharamethakul, Thailand
