= 2003 FIVB World Grand Prix squads =

This article show all participating team squads at the 2003 FIVB Women's Volleyball World Grand Prix, played by twelve countries from 21 July to 3 August 2003 with the final round held in Gioia del Colle, Matera, Italy.

== Brazil ==
The following is the Brazil roster in the 2003 FIVB World Grand Prix.

#	Name	Shirt name	Date of Birth	Weight (kg)	Height (cm)	Spike (cm)	Block (cm)	Club
1	Welissa Gonzaga	Sassá	9 September 1982	76	180	300	287	Parana Volei Clube, BRA
4	Raquel Peluci Silva	Raquel	30 April 1978	69	191	300	282	Parana Volei Clube, BRA
5	Fabiana Alvim de Oliveira	Fabi	7 March 1980	59	168	276	266	A.C. Fluminense, BRA
7	Fabiana Claudino	Fabiana	24 January 1985	76	194	314	293	Minas T.C., Brazil
8	Valeska Menezes	Valeskinha	23 April 1976	62	180	302	290	ADC BCN, BRA
10	Virna Dias	Virna	31 August 1971	70	186	306	294	ADC BCN, BRA
11	Karin Rodrigues	Karin	8 November 1971	77	187	309	285	A.C./Campos, BRA
13	Sheilla Castro	Sheilla	1 July 1983	64	186	302	284	Minas T.C., BRA
14	Paula Pequeno	Paula	22 January 1982	74	183	302	285	ADC BCN, BRA
15	Fabíola de Souza	Fabiola	3 February 1983	79	184	292	277	Minas T.C., BRA
16	Marcelle Moraes	Marcelle	17 October 1976	72	181	303	289	Sao Caetano, BRA
17	Renata Colombo	Renata	25 February 1981	72	181	0	0	Sao Caetano, BRA

== Canada ==
The following is the Canada roster in the 2003 FIVB World Grand Prix.

#	Name	Shirt name	Date of Birth	Weight (kg)	Height (cm)	Spike (cm)	Block (cm)	Club
1	Stephanie Wheler	Wheler	22 April 1983	76	187	300	282	University of Saskatchewan
3	Amy Nicole Tutt	Tutt	25 April 1976	83	182	299	281	Benidorm, Spain
4	Tammy Mahon	Mahon	4 November 1980	79	180	292	282	University of Manitoba
5	Lisa Reynolds	Reynolds	7 June 1978	69	178	298	278	BNI Phinisi Jakarta
6	Anne-Marie Lemieux	Lemieux	23 July 1976	66	178	289	277	Castelo de Maia, Portugal
7	Barb Bellini	Bellini	14 March 1977	77	185	304	290	Castello de Maia, Portugal
9	Janis Kelly	Kelly	20 March 1971	74	175	310	291	Futura Volley, Italy
10	Lies Verhoeff	Verhoeff	31 October 1981	72	193	302	285	Trinity Western University
13	Sarah Pavan	Pavan	16 August 1986	70	197	311	298	Waterloo Tigers
15	Melissa Raymond	Raymond	27 August 1980	76	187	301	287	University of Sherbrooke
16	Annie Levesque	Levesque	9 September 1979	61	164	274	260	University of Sherbrooke
18	Gina Schmidt	Schmidt	18 May 1980	70	181	297	289	Biel/Bienne. Switzerland, Oreg

== China ==
The following is the China roster in the 2003 FIVB World Grand Prix.

#	Name	Shirt name	Date of Birth	Weight (kg)	Height (cm)	Spike (cm)	Block (cm)	Club
2	Feng Kun	K. Feng	28 December 1978	75	183	319	310	Beijing, Beijing
3	Yang Hao	H. Yang	21 March 1980	75	183	319	314	Liaoning, CHN
4	Liu Yanan	Y.N. Liu	29 September 1980	73	186	320	313	Liaoning, CHN
5	Chu Jinling	J.L.CHU	29 July 1984	72	190	310	302	Liaoning, CHN
6	Li Shan	S. Li	21 May 1980	72	185	317	300	Tianjin, CHN
7	Zhou Suhong	S.H. Zhou	23 April 1979	75	182	313	305	Zhejiang, Hangzhou CHN
8	Zhao Ruirui	R.R. Zhao	2 November 1981	75	198	326	315	Army, CHN
9	Zhang Yuehong	Y.H. Zhang	9 November 1975	73	182	324	322	Liaoning, CHN
10	Chen Jing	J. Chen	3 September 1975	75	182	312	306	Sichuan, CHN
12	Song Nina	N. N.Song	7 April 1980	65	179	303	293	Army, CHN
15	Wang Lina	L. N. Wang	5 February 1978	75	181	319	300	Army, CHN
16	Zhang Na	N. Zhang	19 April 1980	72	180	302	292	Tianjin, CHN

== Cuba ==
The following is the Cuba roster in the 2003 FIVB World Grand Prix.

#	Name	Shirt name	Date of Birth	Weight (kg)	Height (cm)	Spike (cm)	Block (cm)	Club
1	Yumilka Ruiz	Ruiz	8 May 1978	62	179	329	315	Camaguey, CUB
2	Yanelis Santos	Santos A.	30 March 1986	71	180	315	312	Ciego de Avilas, CUB
3	Daimí Ramírez	Ramirez	8 October 1983	67	181	305	290	Ciudad Habana
4	Misleidis Martínez	Martinez Adlum	3 September 1983	70	176	320	318	Ciudad Habana, CUB
5	Yusleinis Herrera	Herrera Alvarez	12 March 1984	67	178	312	310	Ciudad Habana, CUB
7	Yoslan Muñoz	Munoz Garcia	19 February 1980	72	183	326	312	Ciudad Habana
8	Noralvis Aguilera	Aguilera Fergunzon	5 November 1982	69	179	312	310	Camaguey, CUB
9	Indira Mestre	Mestre	21 April 1979	73	183	322	311	Ciudad Habana, CUB
12	Rosir Calderón	Calderon Diaz	28 December 1984	66	190	330	325	Ciuda Habana, CUB
13	Yusidey Silié	Silie	11 November 1984	80	183	316	300	Ciudad Habana
14	Kenia Carcaces	Cascases Opon	22 January 1986	69	190	308	306	Holguin
15	Marhta Zamora	Zamora Gil	15 October 1983	67	187	319	318	Las Tunas, CUB

== Germany ==
The following is the Germany roster in the 2003 FIVB World Grand Prix.

#	Name	Shirt name	Date of Birth	Weight (kg)	Height (cm)	Spike (cm)	Block (cm)	Club
2	Kathleen Weiß	Weiss	2 February 1984	55	171	286	266	Schweriner SC, GER
3	Tanja Hart	Hart	24 January 1974	70	176	291	275	SSV Ulm Aliud Pharma, GER
6	Julia Schlecht	Schlecht	16 March 1980	67	182	298	277	Bayer Leverkusen, GER
7	Katja Wühler	Wühler	19 January 1979	73	187	302	290	Rote Raben Vilsbiburg, GER
8	Cornelia Dumler	Dumler	22 January 1982	69	181	309	285	USC Münster, GER
9	Christina Benecke	Benecke	14 October 1974	80	190	314	291	Romanelli Firenze, ITA
10	Anika Schulz	Schulz	22 June 1983	68	180	303	281	Schweriner SC, GER
12	Olessya Kulakova	Kulakova	31 January 1977	70	190	315	298	RC Cannes, FRA
13	Atika Bouagaa	Bouagaa	22 May 1982	69	184	306	289	USC Münster, GER
14	Kathy Radzuweit	Radzuweit	2 March 1982	72	197	319	300	Bayer Leverkusen, GER
15	Angelina Grün	Grün	2 December 1979	67	185	309	287	Volley Modena, ITA
16	Judith Sylvester	Sylvester	13 October 1977	85	193	312	296	Bayer Leverkusen, GER

== Italy ==
The following is the Italy roster in the 2003 FIVB World Grand Prix.

#	Name	Shirt name	Date of Birth	Weight (kg)	Height (cm)	Spike (cm)	Block (cm)	Club
1	Elisa Galastri	Galastri	21 August 1978	64	183	307	292	Icot, Forlì
3	Elisa Togut	Togut	14 May 1978	70	193	320	295	Monte Schiavo, Jesi
4	Manuela Leggeri	Leggeri	9 May 1976	74	186	312	281	Monte Schiavo, Jesi
5	Sara Anzanello	Anzanello	30 July 1980	78	192	316	298	Asystel, Novara
6	Valentina Fiorin	Fiorin	9 October 1984	69	187	305	287	Metodo, Vicenza
8	Silvia Croatto	Croatto	6 May 1973	75	182	305	280	Tenerife, Spain
9	Nadia Centoni	Centoni	19 June 1981	63	182	307	291	Metodo, Vicenza
10	Simona Gioli	Gioli	17 September 1977	72	184	307	283	Despar, Perugia
13	Rachele Sangiuliano	Sangiuliano	23 June 1981	67	182	304	279	Icot, Forlì
14	Eleonora Lo Bianco	Lo Bianco	22 December 1979	70	171	287	273	Monte Schiavo, Jesi
15	Valentina Borrelli	Borrelli	30 October 1978	71	190	316	300	Johnson Matthey, Spezzano
17	Paola Cardullo	Cardullo	18 March 1982	56	162	275	268	Asystel, Novara

== Japan ==
The following is the Japan roster in the 2003 FIVB World Grand Prix.

#	Name	Shirt name	Date of Birth	Weight (kg)	Height (cm)	Spike (cm)	Block (cm)	Club
1	Tomoko Yoshihara	Yoshihara	4 February 1970	63	180	305	295	Pioneer Red Wings, Yamagata, J
2	Yukiko Uchida	Uchida	18 July 1971	56	167	285	268	Pioneer Red Wings, Yamagata, J
4	Miki Sasaki	Sasaki	15 December 1976	76	182	317	307	Pioneer Red Wings, Yamagata, J
5	Kanako Omura	Omura	15 December 1976	69	184	319	290	Hisamitsu Spring Attackers, JP
7	Yoshie Takeshita	Takeshita	18 March 1978	55	159	280	270	JT Marvelous, Osaka, JPN
8	Hiromi Suzuki	Suzuki	14 November 1978	72	185	302	292	Takufuji Bamboo, Saitama, JPN
9	Miyuki Takahashi	Takahashi	25 December 1978	67	170	290	280	NEC Red Rockets, Kanagawa, JPN
10	Makiko Horai	Horai	6 January 1979	62	187	312	300	JT Marvelous, Osaka, JPN
11	Yuko Sano	Sano	26 July 1979	53	159	260	254	Toray Arrows, Shiga, JPN
12	Sachiko Sugiyama	Sugiyama	19 October 1979	69	184	310	305	NEC Red Rockets, Kanagawa, JPN
17	Kana Oyama	Oyama	19 June 1984	82	187	308	287	Toray Arrows, Shiga, JPN
18	Megumi Kurihara	Kurihara	31 July 1984	64	188	305	285	NEC Red Rockets, Kanagawa, JPN

== Netherlands ==
The following is the Netherlands roster in the 2003 FIVB World Grand Prix.

#	Name	Shirt name	Date of Birth	Weight (kg)	Height (cm)	Spike (cm)	Block (cm)	Club
1	Kim Staelens	K. Staelens	7 January 1982	75	182	305	301	USC Münster, GER
2	Suzanne Freriks	Freriks	16 September 1984	63	178	280	270	VC Weert, NED
3	Francien Huurman	Huurman	18 April 1975	75	190	319	307	Hisamitsu Springs, JPN
5	Janneke van Tienen	v. Tienen	29 May 1979	73	176	280	273	VC Weert, NED
6	Elles Leferink	Leferink	14 November 1976	70	177	291	279	Ulm, GER
7	Elke Wijnhoven	Wijnhoven	3 January 1981	62	168	293	282	Ulm, GER
9	Kitty Sanders	Sanders	4 April 1980	72	185	305	293	ARKE/Pollux, NED
10	Irina Donets	Donets	20 August 1976	75	186	296	285	Ravenna, ITA
11	Ruth van der Wel-Heerschap	v.d. Wel	6 January 1978	70	191	308	290	Vilsbiburg, GER
12	Manon Flier	Flier	8 February 1984	73	192	307	297	VC Weert, NED
13	Titia Sustring	Sustring	27 April 1979	68	186	298	283	Tongeren, BEL
15	Ingrid Visser	Visser	4 June 1977	73	192	312	292	Hotel Cantur Las Palmas, ESP

== Russia ==
The following is the Russia roster in the 2003 FIVB World Grand Prix.

#	Name	Shirt name	Date of Birth	Weight (kg)	Height (cm)	Spike (cm)	Block (cm)	Club
1	Tatiana Gorchkova	Gorchkova	8 March 1981	75	198	314	305	Uralochka, RUS
2	Irina Tebenikhina	Tebenikhina	5 December 1978	74	189	308	299	Uralochka, Rus
3	Anastasiya Belikova	Belikova	22 July 1979	78	190	306	300	Uralochka, RUS
5	Olga Fateeva	Fateeva	4 May 1984	72	190	294	281	Dinamo, RUS
7	Natalya Safronova	Safronova	6 February 1979	74	188	312	305	Uralochka, RUS
8	Yevgeniya Artamonova	Artamonova	17 July 1975	74	192	315	306	Uralochka, RUS
9	Elizaveta Tishchenko	Tichtchenko	7 February 1975	74	190	309	302	Uralochka, RUS
10	Olga Chukanova	Chukanova	9 June 1980	69	181	305	294	Uralochka, RUS
11	Yekaterina Gamova	Gamova	17 October 1980	82	204	321	310	Uralochka, RUS
12	Marina Sheshenina	Sheshenina	26 June 1985	66	177	289	277	Uralochka, RUS
14	Yelena Plotnikova	Plotnikova	26 July 1978	73	185	306	298	Uralochka, RUS
16	Elena Sennikova	Sennikova	20 March 1979	71	180	299	292	Uralochka, RUS

== South Korea ==
The following is the South Korea roster in the 2003 FIVB World Grand Prix.

#	Name	Shirt name	Date of Birth	Weight (kg)	Height (cm)	Spike (cm)	Block (cm)	Club
1	Hong Mi-Sun	M.S. Hong	10 May 1983	70	183	285	280	Tobacco&Ginseng, KOR
3	Lee Sook-Ja	S.J. Lee	17 June 1980	62	175	286	264	Hyundai, KOR
4	Lee Yun-Hui	Y.H. Lee	8 October 1980	73	180	310	295	LG Caltex Oil, KOR
5	Kim Sa-Nee	S.N. Kim	21 June 1981	70	181	305	302	Korea Highway Corp., KOR
6	Choi Kwang-Hee	K.H. Choi	25 May 1974	75	174	304	289	Tobacco & Ginseng, KOR
8	Nam Jie-Youn	J.Y. Nam	25 May 1983	64	170	275	270	LG Caltex Oil, KOR
9	Kim Mi-Jin	M.J. Kim	22 July 1979	66	182	315	300	Korea Highway Corp., KOR
11	Lee Meong-Hee	M.H. Lee	7 April 1978	62	175	310	295	Hyundai, KOR
13	Jung Dae-Young	D.Y. Jung	12 August 1981	73	183	315	308	Hyundai, KOR
14	Lim Yu-Jin	Y.J. Lim	24 November 1983	69	179	280	270	Korea Highway Corp., KOR
15	Kim Se-Young	H.S. Kim	4 June 1981	71	190	315	300	Tobacco&Ginseng, KOR
17	Han Yoo-Mi	Y.M. Han	5 February 1982	65	179	307	297	Hyundai, KOR

== Thailand ==
The following is the Thailand roster in the 2003 FIVB World Grand Prix.

#	Name	Shirt name	Date of Birth	Weight (kg)	Height (cm)	Spike (cm)	Block (cm)	Club
1	Wanna Buakaew	B.Wanna	2 January 1981	51	170	287	269	Johnson Spezzano, Italia
4	Nurak Nokputta	N.Nurak	31 January 1982	63	178	295	280	RBAC, Bangkok, Thailand
5	Pleumjit Thinkaow	T.Pleumjit	9 November 1983	63	180	289	279	RBAC, Bangkok, Thailand
7	Narumon Khanan	K.Narumon	26 January 1984	64	179	291	278	RBAC, Bangkok, Thailand
8	Suphap Phongthong	P.Suphap	16 May 1982	61	176	299	276	RBAC, Bangkok, Thailand
9	Piyamas Koijapo	K.Piyamas	23 October 1980	67	178	295	282	RBAC, Bangkok, Thailand
10	Wilavan Apinyapong	A.Wilavan	6 June 1984	67	174	271	259	BEC, Bangkok, Thailand
11	Amporn Hyapha	H.Amporn	19 May 1985	65	179	296	285	BEC, Bkk, Thailand
12	Warapan Thinprabat	T.Warapan	6 November 1982	70	177	288	273	Bangkok Bank, Bkk Thailand
13	Nootsara Tomkom	T.Nootsara	7 July 1985	58	170	279	262	Bangkok Bank, Bangkok, Thailand
14	Patcharee Sangmuang	S.Patcharee	20 March 1978	66	181	294	279	HongHern, China
18	Bouard Lithawat	L.Bouard	20 July 1984	68	178	293	278	RBAC, Bangkok Thailand

== United States ==
The following is the United States roster in the 2003 FIVB World Grand Prix.

#	Name	Shirt name	Date of Birth	Weight (kg)	Height (cm)	Spike (cm)	Block (cm)	Club
1	Prikeba Phipps	Phipps	30 June 1969	77	191	319	303	Jesi Volleyball Club, ITA
2	Danielle Scott	Scott	1 October 1972	84	188	325	302	Pioneer Red Wings, JPN
3	Tayyiba Haneef	Haneef	23 March 1979	80	200	318	299	Pallavolo Reggio Emilia, USA
4	Lindsey Berg	Berg	16 July 1980	81	173	285	270	University of Minnesota, USA
5	Stacy Sykora	Sykora	24 June 1977	61	176	305	295	Olympia Teodora, ITA
7	Heather Bown	Bown	29 November 1978	90	188	301	290	Volley Bergamo, ITA
10	Elisha Thomas	Thomas	20 July 1981	75	190	321	299	Long Beach St. Univ., USA
11	Greichaly Cepero	Cepero	11 August 1981	70	188	309	300	Univ. of Nebraska, USA
13	Tara Cross-Battle	Cross-Battle	16 September 1968	71	180	302	301	Pallavolo Reggio Emila, ITA
15	Logan Tom	Tom	25 May 1981	80	184	306	297	Minas Tenis Clube, BRA
16	Sarah Noriega	Noriega	24 April 1976	70	188	302	301	Chicas de San Juan, PUR
18	Nancy Metcalf	Metcalf	12 November 1978	73	184	314	292	Indias de Mayaguez, PUR
