= 2002 Central American and Caribbean Games women's volleyball squads =

This article show all participating team squads at the 2002 Central American and Caribbean Games, played by eight countries and held from November 28 to December 8, 2002, in San Salvador, El Salvador.

== Barbados ==
- Head Coach:

#	Name	Date of Birth	Height	Weight	Spike	Block
2	Angelina Smith
3	Janelle Chase	22.02.1981	177	59
4	Samantha Joseph	14.06.1986	173	69
6	Shirley Hoyte-Boyce (c)
7	Afiya Taylor
8	Shari Matthews	08.10.1985	169	66
11	Renee Clarke
12	Melissa Branford
13	Alvenia Small
14	Aurea Griffith
15	Jannette Brown	10.02.1976	172	72
16	Avara Brown	24.02.1982	176	70

== Costa Rica ==
- Head Coach: Braulio Godínez

#	Name	Date of Birth	Height	Weight	Spike	Block
2	Jenny Ramón
3	Elluany Smith
4	Ingrid Morales	29.05.1975
5	Xinia Alvarado (c)
6	Angela Willis
7	Adriana Chinchilla	20.03.1980
8	Patricia Alvarado
9	Verania Willis
12	Heidy Valverde
13	Silvia Marín
14	Johana Moore	10.03.1978

== Dominican Republic ==
- Head Coach: Héctor Romero

#	Name	Date of Birth	Height	Weight	Spike	Block
1	Juana Saviñón	13.09.1980	181	75	303	300
3	Yudelkys Bautista	05.12.1974	193	68	312	308
5	Evelyn Carrera	05.10.1971	182	70	301	297
6	Alexandra Caso	25.04.1987	168	59	243	241
7	Annerys Vargas	07.08.1981	194	70	325	315
8	Yndys Novas	07.11.1977	185	69	302	295
9	Nuris Arias	20.05.1973	190	78	315	306
10	Milagros Cabral	17.10.1978	181	63	308	305
12	Francia Jackson (c)	08.11.1975	168	71	280	275
16	Kenia Moreta	07.04.1981	191	76	310	305
17	Sidarka Núñez	25.06.1984	188	58	312	308
18	Karla Echenique	16.05.1986	181	62	279	273

== El Salvador ==
- Head Coach: Rolando Quintana

#	Name	Date of Birth	Height	Weight	Spike	Block
1	Doris Cabrera
2	Glenda Valencia
3	Gabriela Silis
4	Diana Romero
5	Andrea Pineda
7	Alejandra Flores
9	Claudia Sequeira
11	Íngrid Rivas
12	Yanira Romero (c)
13	Aida Calderón
17	Eneida Vásquez

== Mexico ==
- Head Coach: Sergio Hernández

#	Name	Date of Birth	Height	Weight	Spike	Block
1	Yendy Cortinas	04.07.1982	185	71	296	294
2	Migdalel Ruiz (c)	03.03.1983	180	75	307	298
3	Célida Córdova	01.08.1980	174	68	282	272
5	Kenia Olvera	06.05.1975	185	74	295	275
6	Martha Revuelta	06.09.1986	176	77	295	287
8	Marcia González	10.02.1975
10	Bibiana Candelas	02.12.1983	196	78	310	302
11	Blanca Chan	26.07.1981	182	75	298	286
12	Claudia Rodríguez	10.08.1981	191	95	315	305
13	Mariana López	30.08.1985	178	69	295	286
15	Marion Frias	19.01.1982	190	97	295	273
17	Paola Estrada	11.09.1979	171	67	285	265

== Nicaragua ==
- Head Coach: Rene Quintana

#	Name	Date of Birth	Height	Weight	Spike	Block
1	Claudia Torres
2	Karen López
3	Lia Cruz
5	Heissell Carcache
6	Valeria Mendoza
7	Gabriela Turcios
8	Miriam Blandino
9	Claudia Noguera
10	Heidy Traña
11	Johanna Padilla
12	Bertha Fierro
13	Heidy Rostrán

== Puerto Rico ==
- Head Coach: David Alemán

#	Name	Date of Birth	Height	Weight	Spike	Block
1	Lourdes Isern
2	Tatiana Encarnación	28.07.1985	182	72	300	279
3	Vilmarie Mojica	13.08.1985	177	63	295	274
4	Alexandra Gómez
5	Sarai Álvarez	03.04.1986	189	61	295	286
6	Yarleen Santiago	18.01.1978	182	72	305	287
7	Dolly Meléndez
10	Carol Rodríguez
11	Karina Ocasio	08.01.1985	192	76	298	288
12	Xiomara Molero (c)
17	Sheila Ocasio	17.11.1982	192	74	310	292
18	Jetzabel Del Valle	19.12.1979	185	73	305	292

== Venezuela ==
- Head Coach: Irina Bespalova

#	Name	Date of Birth	Height	Weight	Spike	Block
1	Alejandra García
2	Verónica Gómez	30.08.1985	184	79
3	Orquídea Vera
5	Annmary González
6	Suyika Oropeza	23.12.1985	188	82
7	Mayra Vásquez
8	Amarilis Villar	30.03.1984	178	70	280	276
9	Jayce Andrade	19.05.1984	179	66	300	296
10	Desiree Glod (c)	28.09.1982	176	64	305	301
12	Yaseidy Castañeda
13	Cristina Piña
17	Carmen San Miguel	07.12.1984	185	64
