= Maycock =

Maycock is a surname. Notable people with the surname include:

- Alfred Maycock (born 1949), former Guyanese cricketer
- Anna Maycock (born 1982), captain of the Australia women's national volleyball team
- Betty-Jean Maycock Harrington (born 1942), former Olympic gymnast from Cleveland, Ohio
- Callum Maycock (born 1997), English footballer
- Ellen Maycock (born 1950), American mathematician
- Mary Dye née Maycock (born 1961), American politician of the Republican Party
- Pam Royds née Maycock (1924–2016), British publisher and children's book editor
- Renae Maycock (born 1980), Australian volleyball player

== See also ==
- Maycock's Bay, Barbados
- Mycock, a surname
