= Noralvis =

Noralvis is a Cuban feminine given name. Notable people with the name include:

- Noralvis Aguilera (born 1982), Cuban volleyball player
- Noralvis de Las Heras, Cuban Paralympic track and field athlete
