= Heba =

Heba or Hebah may refer to:

== Places ==
- Heba, Nan County, a town in Yiyang, Hunan province, China
- Heba Township, in Majiang County, Guizhou province, China
- Heba, an Etruscan city

== People ==
=== Given name ===
- Heba Abdel Gawad (born 1982), Egyptian synchronized swimmer
- Heba Ahmed (born 1985), Egyptian rower
- Heba Al-Farra, Libyan-born Palestinian environmentalist
- Heba Allejji (born 1997), Syrian table tennis player
- Heba Aly (journalist) (born 1983), Canadian-Egyptian journalist and news executive
- Heba Amin (born 1980), Egyptian visual artist, researcher, and educator
- Heba Bevan, British electronics engineer and entrepreneur
- Heba El Torky (born 1991), Egyptian squash player
- Heba Hefny (born 1972), Egyptian judoka
- Heba Kadry, Egyptian mastering engineer
- Heba Kotb (born 1967), Egyptian sex therapist and television presenter
- Heba Rabie (born 1983), Egyptian volleyball player
- Heba Raouf Ezzat (born 1965), Egyptian academic, writer, and activist
- Heba Saadia (born 1989), Palestinian association football referee
- Heba Selim (died 1974), Egyptian spy
- Heba Shibani, Libyan war correspondent, film producer, and women's rights activist
- Heba Yazbak (born 1985), Israeli Arab politician, sociologist, and academic
- Heba Zagout (1984–2023), Palestinian artist and teacher
- Hebah Fakhereddin (born 1990), Jordanian footballer
- Hebah Patel (born 1989), Indian actress

=== Surname ===
- Teodor Heba (1914–2001), Albanian politician

== Other uses ==
- Hellenic Basketball Association, a governing body for basketball in Greece

== See also ==
- Hiba (disambiguation)
