= Lealamanua =

Lealamanua is a surname. Notable people with the surname include:

- Kas Lealamanua (born 1976), Samoan rugby union player
- Ruta Lealamanua (born 1974), New Zealand softball player
- Tolotear Lealamanua (born 1983), Australian volleyball player
