= Tayyiba Haneef-Park =

American volleyball player

Personal information
- Full name: Tayyiba Mumtaz Haneef-Park
- Nationality: American
- Born: March 23, 1979 (age 47); Laguna Hills, California, U.S.
- Height: 6 ft 7 in (2.01 m)
- Spike: 129 in (328 cm)
- Block: 123 in (312 cm)

Volleyball information
- Position: Opposite
- Current club: Igtisadchi Baku
- Number: 3

Career
Years	Teams
1998–2001; 2001–02; 2002–03; 2003–04; 2004–05; 2005–06; 2006–07; 2007–08; 2008–09; 2010–2012	(United States) Long Beach State (United States) USA National Team (Italy) PV Reggio Emilia (United States) USA National Team (Japan) Takefuji Bamboo (United States) USA National Team (Russia) Dinamo Kazan (Turkey) Eczacıbaşı Istanbul (Japan) Pioneer Red Wings (Azerbaijan) Igtisadchi Baku

National team
2001–2012	United States
Medal record
Women's volleyball
Representing the United States
Olympic Games
Silver medal – second place	2008 Beijing	Team
Silver medal – second place	2012 London	Team
World Championship
Silver medal – second place	2002 Germany	Team
FIVB World Cup
Silver medal – second place	2011 Japan	Team
Bronze medal – third place	2003 Japan	Team
Bronze medal – third place	2007 Japan	Team
FIVB World Grand Prix
Gold medal – first place	2012 Ningbo	Team
Bronze medal – third place	2003 Andria	Team
Bronze medal – third place	2004 Reggio Calabria	Team
Pan American Games
Bronze medal – third place	2007 Rio de Janeiro	Team
NORCECA Championship
Gold medal – first place	2005 Port of Spain
Silver medal – second place	2007 Winnipeg

Tayyiba Mumtaz Haneef-Park (born March 23, 1979) is an American indoor volleyball head coach and former player who is the head coach of the San Diego Mojo of the Pro Volleyball Federation (PVF). She played at the 2004 Summer Olympics in Athens, Greece, where the team finished in 5th place. Haneef-Park also competed in the 2008 Beijing Olympics, where she won a silver medal with team USA. After her pregnancy in 2010, she returned to Team USA to repeat their silver medal performance at the 2012 London Olympics. Both times USA lost to Brazil.

== High school and personal life ==
Haneef-Park was born in Upland, California, to Mobarik and Patricia Haneef. She grew up in Laguna Hills, California, and attended Laguna Hills High School from 1993–1997 where she led the Hawks to the 1997 DII title and was named the California Athlete of the Year and was the Pacific Coast MVP. She also participated in track and field, winning the CIF California State Meet in the high jump in 1997.

Her name, Tayyiba, is Arabic. Her father's family is Muslim, but she is not.

Her cousin, Tari Phillips, is a former WNBA player currently playing basketball in Italy.

Haneef-Park, who married U.S. Air Force pilot Anthony Park in May 2007, announced her pregnancy on August 21, 2009, through Facebook. The baby was due in March 2010. She resumed training with the U.S. national team in the summer of 2010.

In 2009, Haneef-Park joined Jennifer Joines Tamas appearing on Dr. Phil discussing their exceptional height. Haneef-Park is the third tallest Olympic volleyball player, marginally behind two Russian players.

== College highlights ==
At Long Beach State she was named to the American Volleyball Coaches Association (AVCA) All-America first team in 2001 after leading LBSU in kills per game (5.03) as a senior. She guided the 49'ers to a 33–1 record and a runner-up finish at the 2001 NCAA Championships. She was a three-time All-Big West first-team selection. As a senior in 2001, she posted a hitting percentage of 0.406 and also averaged 2.31 digs and 0.73 blocks per game as a senior. She was also a three-time All-American high jumper at LBSU, and she competed at the 2000 U.S. Olympic Track and Field Trials, finishing 10th with a jump of 5–10 ¾. Haneef-Park was inducted into the 49er Athletic Hall of Fame at Long Beach State on November 19, 2008.

== International competition ==
- 2012
  - Olympic Games
- 2011
  - FIVB World Cup (silver medal)
- 2008
  - Olympic Games
  - FIVB World Grand Prix (fourth place)
- 2007
  - Pan American Games (bronze medal)
  - FIVB World Grand Prix (eighth place)
  - NORCECA Championship (silver medal)
  - FIVB World Cup (bronze medal)
- 2006
  - Pan American Cup (fourth place)
  - FIVB World Grand Prix (seventh place)
  - World Championships (ninth place)

== Coaching career ==
In 2021, Haneef-Park was an assistant coach for the USA Volleyball women’s collegiate national team. In 2022 she was hired as an assistant coach by the University of Oregon, where she helped set a volleyball program record with 17 conference match wins.

Haneef-Park was hired by the San Diego Mojo of the Pro Volleyball Federation to be their head coach for their inaugural 2024 season.

== Individual awards ==
- 2007 Pan-American Games "Best Server"
- 2005 NORCECA Championship "Best Scorer"
