= Judith Arias =

Dominican Republic beach volleyball player

Personal information
- Nationality: Dominican Republic

Beach volleyball information
Years	Teammate
2003	Yndys Novas

Best results
Years	Location	Result
2003	Santo Domingo	9th
- Last updated: September 2010

Judith Arias Taylor is a female beach volleyball player from the Dominican Republic, who played with Yndys Novas in the 2003 Pan American Games in Santo Domingo, Dominican Republic. They finished in the 9th position.
