= Hiba =

Hiba may refer to:

== Botany ==
- Thujopsis, a genus of conifer in the cypress family

== Places ==
- Hiba District, Hiroshima, Japan
- El Hiba, the modern name of the ancient Egyptian city of Tayu-djayet
- Mount Hiba (Hiroshima), a mountain in Shōbara, Hiroshima Prefecture, Japan
- Mount Hiba (Shimane), a mountain in Yasugi, Shimane Prefecture, Japan
- Lagash, or Al-Hiba, an ancient Sumerian city state in Mesopotamia

== People ==
- Ahmed al-Hiba (1877–1919), Moroccan leader of armed resistance to the French colonial power
- Ibas of Edessa (died 457), bishop of Edessa (c. 435 – 457)
- Hiba Abouk (born 1986), Spanish actress
- Hiba Bukhari (born 1993), Pakistani actress
- Hiba El Jaafil (born 1987), Lebanese football manager and former player
- Hiba Feredj (born 1999), Algerian table tennis player
- Hiba Kawas (born 1972), Lebanese operatic soprano, composer, and academic
- Hiba Mohamed (born 1968), Sudanese molecular biologist
- Hiba Abu Nada (1991–2023), Palestinian poet, novelist, nutritionist, and Wikimedian
- Hiba Nawab, Indian actress
- Hiba Omar (born 1990), Syrian athlete
- Hiba Schahbaz (born 1981), Pakistani-American painter
- Hiba Tawaji (born 1987), Lebanese singer, actress, and director

== See also ==
- Heba (disambiguation)
