= Heather Bown =

American volleyball player

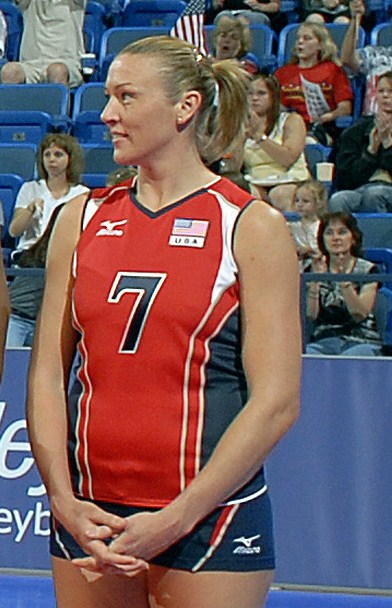

Personal information
- Born: November 29, 1978 (age 47); Orange, California, U.S.
- Height: 6 ft 2 in (188 cm)
- Spike: 301 cm (119 in)
- Block: 290 cm (114 in)

Volleyball information
- Position: Middle Blocker
- Number: 7

Career
Years	Teams
1996-97; 1998–00; 2000–02; 2002–03; 2003–04; 2004–05; 2005–06; 2006–10; 2010–11; 2011–12; 2012-13	(United States) UC Santa Barbara (United States) University of Hawaii (Italy) Teodora Ravenna (Italy) Volley Bergamo (Italy) Volley Modena (Italy) Santeramo Sport (Italy) Airone Tortolì (Italy) Vini Monteschiavo Jesi (Turkey) Eczacıbaşı VitrA (Azerbaijan) Azerrail Baku (Russia) Dynamo Kazan

National team
2000–2012	United States
Medal record
Women's volleyball
Representing the United States
Olympic Games
Silver medal – second place	2008 Beijing	Team
World Championship
Silver medal – second place	2002 Germany	Team
World Cup
Silver medal – second place	2011 Japan	Team
Bronze medal – third place	2003 Japan	Team
Bronze medal – third place	2007 Japan	Team
Grand Prix
Gold medal – first place	2001 Macau	Team
Gold medal – first place	2010 Ningbo	Team
Gold medal – first place	2011 Macau	Team
Gold medal – first place	2012 Ningbo	Team
Bronze medal – third place	2003 Andria	Team
Bronze medal – third place	2004 Reggio Calabria	Team
NORCECA Championship
Gold medal – first place	2001 Santo Domingo
Gold medal – first place	2003 Santo Domingo
Gold medal – first place	2011 Caguas
Silver medal – second place	2007 Winnipeg
Pan American Cup
Bronze medal – third place	2010 Rosarito & Tijuana
Final Four Cup
Silver medal – second place	2009 Lima

Heather Erin Bown (born November 29, 1978) is an American retired volleyball player who played as a middle-blocker. She represented the United States at the 2004 Summer Olympics in Athens, Greece. There she finished in fifth place with the USA national team. She also competed at the 2000 Summer Olympics. Bown made her third straight Olympic appearance in Beijing, helping Team USA to a silver medal.

== Early life and education ==
Bown was born in Orange, California, and calls Yorba Linda, California home. She graduated from Esperanza High School in Anaheim where she was a three-year letterwinner. She was named all-CIF twice and played club volleyball for NIKE Ichiban that won the Junior Olympics in 1996.

Bown attended the University of California, Santa Barbara, for two seasons, where her squad advanced to the NCAA regional finals in 1997. In her sophomore campaign, she was named to the all-Big West first team after finishing the season ranked ninth nationally in hitting percentage (.384).

She transferred to the University of Hawaiʻi in 1998 where she was named an American Volleyball Coaches Association First Team All-American and was the 1998 and 1999 WAC Player of the Year. In 1998, she ranked first in the WAC in hitting percentage (.389) and blocking (1.69) and led the team in kills in 24 matches. She had a career-high 30 kills vs. BYU-Hawaii. As a senior in 1999, she repeated as the WAC Player of the Year and repeated as an AVCA First Team All-American. In 1999, she led the nation with 2.25 block per game and posted 411 kills, 230 blocks and a .364 hitting percentage for the year.

== Awards and honors ==
=== Individual ===
- 2001 NORCECA Championship "Best Spiker"
- 2008–09 CEV Challenge Cup "Best Blocker"

=== Club ===
- 2008–09 CEV Challenge Cup – Champion, with Monte Schiavo Banca Marche Jesi
- 2011 Turkish Cup – Champion, with Eczacıbaşı VitrA
