= Gheorghe Chivorchian =

Romanian football club president

- Born: July 26, 1954 (age 72); Bacău, Romania
- Other occupation: General Secretary at FRF

Domestic
Years	League	Role
1988–1996	Ceahlăul Piatra Neamț	President
1996–1997	Foresta Fălticeni	President
1997–2007	FCM Bacău	President
2007–2012	Politehnica Timişoara	President
2012–2014	Ceahlăul Piatra Neamț	President

Gheorghe Chivorchian (born July 26, 1954 in Bacău), is the general secretary of the Romanian Football Federation. From 1997 until 2014, he was president of different clubs from Romania.

His daughter Maria is a retired professional volleyball player.
