= 2001 Women's NORCECA Volleyball Championship =

Tournament details
- Host country: Dominican Republic
- Dates: October 10–14, 2001
- Teams: 6
- Venue: (in Santo Domingo host cities)

Final positions
- Champions: United States (3rd title)

Tournament awards
- MVP: (United States) Tara Cross-Battle

The 2001 Women's NORCECA Volleyball Championship was the 17th edition of the Women's Continental Volleyball Tournament, played by six countries from October 10 to October 14, 2001, in Santo Domingo, Dominican Republic.

The United States won the gold medal, after defeated Cuba and qualified for the 2001 FIVB World Grand Champions Cup; the Dominican Republic was third after winning over the Mexican team. Puerto Rico withdrawed and was replaced by Costa Rica; Canada and Jamaica cancelled their participation because of the recent flying problems derived by the September 11 attacks. Tara Cross-Battle of the United States won Most valuable player award.

== Competing nations ==
Group A	Group B
Costa Rica; Dominican Republic; Mexico	Cuba; El Salvador; United States

== Preliminary round ==
=== Group A ===
	Team	Points	G	W	L	PW	PL	Ratio	SW	SL	Ratio
1.	Dominican R.	4	2	2	0				6	0	MAX
2.	Mexico	3	2	1	1				3	4	0.750
3.	Costa Rica	2	2	0	2				1	6	0.166

- October 10

Dominican R.	3 – 0	Costa Rica	25-12 25-09 25-15

- October 11

Mexico	3 – 1	Costa Rica	25-14 25-17 22-25 25–18

- October 12

Dominican R.	3 – 0	Mexico	25-16 25-14 25–17

=== Group B ===
	Team	Points	G	W	L	PW	PL	Ratio	SW	SL	Ratio
1.	United States	4	2	2	0				6	2	3.000
2.	Cuba	3	2	1	1				5	3	1.666
3.	El Salvador	2	2	0	2				0	6	0.000

- October 10

United States	3 – 0	El Salvador	25-06 25-02 25-03

- October 11

Cuba	3 – 0	El Salvador	25-10 25-13 25–10

- October 12

United States	3 – 2	Cuba	27-29 28-26 24-26 25-19 15–12

== Final round ==
Semi-finals
2001-10-13 – Santo Domingo
United States	3
Mexico	1
2001-10-13 – Santo Domingo
Dominican Republic	2
Cuba	3

Final
2001-10-14 – Santo Domingo
Cuba	0
United States	3
3rd place
2001-10-14 – Santo Domingo
Dominican Republic	3
Mexico	1

=== Semi-finals ===
- October 13

United States	3 – 1	Mexico	25-18 25-18 22-25 25–23
Dominican R.	2 – 3	Cuba	25-17 25-22 20-25 23-25 09–15

=== Finals ===
- October 14 — Fifth Place Match

Costa Rica	3 – ??	El Salvador

- October 14 — Bronze Medal Match

Dominican R.	3 – 1	Mexico	25-17 22-25 25-16 25–17

- October 14 — Gold Medal Match

United States	3 – 1	Cuba	20-25 25-22 25-18 27–25

== Final ranking ==
Place	Team
1st place, gold medalist(s)	United States
2nd place, silver medalist(s)	Cuba
3rd place, bronze medalist(s)	Dominican Republic
4.	Mexico
5.	Costa Rica
6.	El Salvador

2001 Women's NORCECA winners

United States
Third title

== Individual awards ==
- Most valuable player
  - Tara Cross-Battle (USA)
- Best spiker
  - Heather Bown (USA)
- Best blocker
  - Sarah Noriega (USA)
- Best server
  - (25x17px)
- Best digger
  - (25x17px)
- Best setter
  - Robyn Ah Mow (USA)
- Best receiver
  - Stacy Sykora (USA)
- Best libero
  - (25x17px)
- Best coach
  - (25x17px)
