= Stacy Sykora =

American former volleyball player

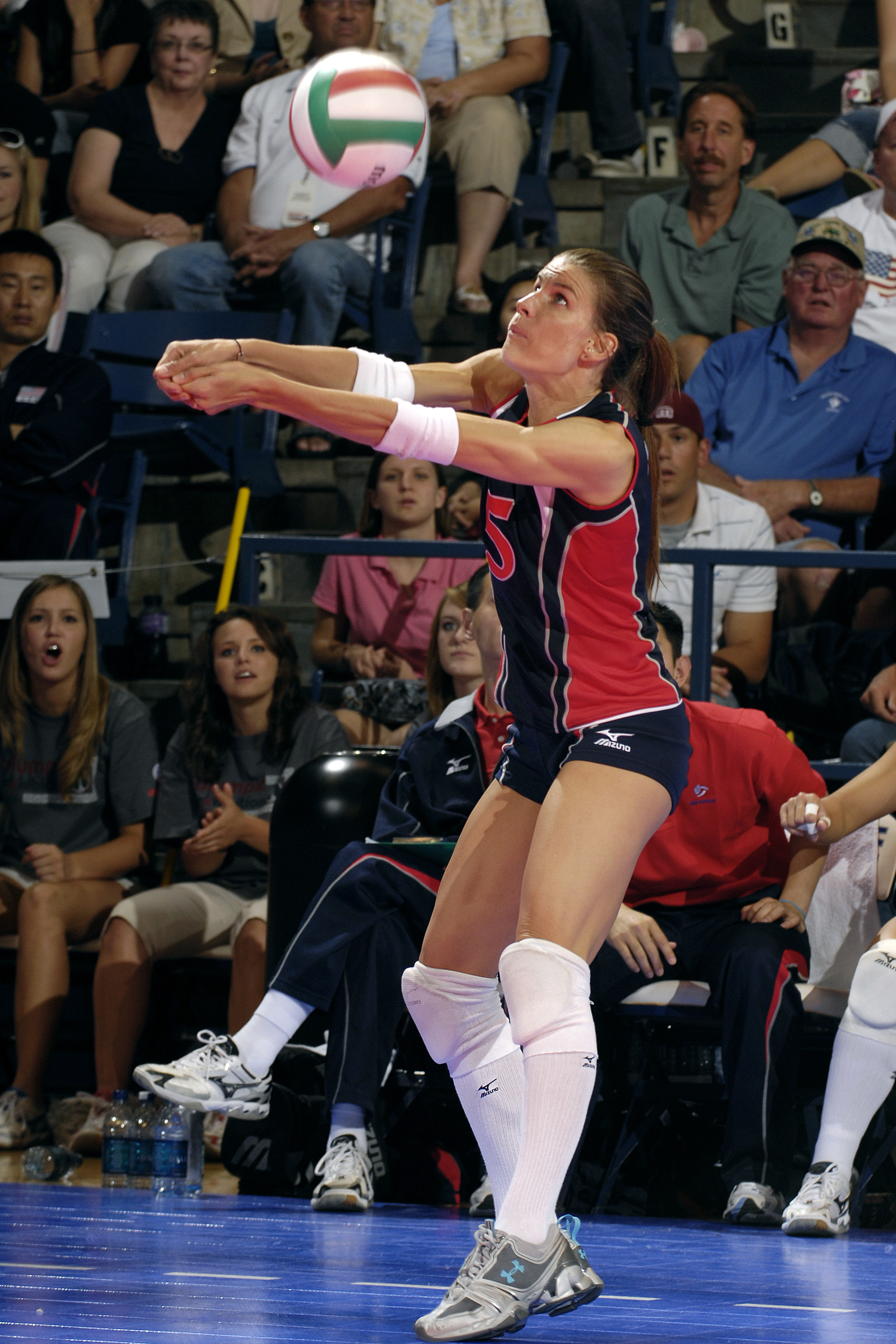

Personal information
- Nationality: American
- Born: Stacy Denise Sykora; June 24, 1977 (age 49); Fort Worth, Texas, U.S.
- Height: 5 ft 9 in (1.75 m)

Volleyball information
- Position: Libero
- Number: 5

National team
1999–2012	United States
Medal record
Women's volleyball
Representing the United States
Olympic Games
Silver medal – second place	2008 Beijing	Team
World Championship
Silver medal – second place	2002 Germany	Team
FIVB World Cup
Bronze medal – third place	2003 Japan	Team
Bronze medal – third place	2007 Japan	Team
FIVB World Grand Prix
Gold medal – first place	2001 Macau	Team
Gold medal – first place	2010 Ningbo	Team
Bronze medal – third place	2003 Andria	Team
Bronze medal – third place	2004 Reggio Calabria	Team
Pan American Cup
Gold medal – first place	2003 Saltillo
Gold medal – first place	2012 Juárez
Bronze medal – third place	2010 Rosarito/Tijuana
Final Four Cup
Silver medal – second place	2009 Lima

Stacy Denise Sykora (born June 24, 1977) is an American retired volleyball player. She was a two-time All-American at Texas A&M University and she competed in both the 2000 and the 2004 Olympics as part of the U.S. women's national team. She made her third Olympic appearance at the 2008 Olympics, helping Team USA to a silver medal.

Sykora won the gold medal with her team at the 2001 and 2010 FIVB World Grand Prix.

== Early life ==
Sykora was born in Fort Worth, Texas, to Ed Sykora and Sherian Richards. She was raised in Burleson (a Fort Worth suburb) with her two older sisters, Kim and Keri. As a student at Burleson High School, Sykora dreamed of becoming an Olympic athlete, but was unwilling to choose between volleyball, basketball, and track and field. After graduating from high school, she accepted a scholarship to play volleyball at Texas A&M University under coach Laurie Flachmeier Corbelli, a member of the USA Volleyball team which won the silver medal at the 1984 Summer Olympics.

== Texas A&M University ==
While attending Texas A&M University, Sykora competed in volleyball, basketball and track, winning a Big 12 Conference title in the heptathlon. As a true freshman, Sykora played in all but one of the volleyball team's 30 matches, leading the team in kills in four matches and in digs three times.

As a sophomore, Sykora set a school record with 24 digs in a three-game loss to Michigan State in the NCAA Tournament. Against nationally ranked Loyola Marymount, she posted a career-high 30 kills, leading the Aggies to victory. After leading the Big 12 in digs with an average of 4.01 digs per game, Sykora was named that Texas A&M Volleyball defensive player of the year, and earned AVCA All-District 5 honors.

In her junior year, Sykora led the team and ranked second in the Big 12 in digs, with an average of 3.80 per game. For her performance throughout the year she was named MVP of the Georgia Invitational, First-Team All Big 12, AVCA All-District 5, and AVCA Second-Team All-American.

The following year, her last year of college eligibility, Sykora ranked 9th in the country in digs per game (4.37). She also led the Aggies in kills, with 4.74 per game, and earned First-Team All Big 12 honors. She was also named to the American Volleyball Coaches Association's All-District 5 team and was an AVCA Second-Team All-American.

== USA Volleyball ==
=== 1999 ===
In late 1998, the International Volleyball Federation introduced a new position, known as the libero, that specialized in defensive skills. Sykora's coach, Corbelli, encouraged her to try out for this new position on the US volleyball team. In January 1999, Sykora joined the USA women's volleyball team playing this new position. During her first year of international play, she recorded a team-high 456 digs, including 153 at the World Cup. She was named the Best Receiver at the BCV Volley Masters, also placing third in digging. While on the Japan Tour, she recorded a career-high 22 digs in the June 30 match, before becoming the team's primary passer and defensive player on the bronze-medal winning Pan American Games squad.

=== 2000 ===
In her second year of professional competition, Sykora again led the team in digs, with 553. She was named Best Libero at the Nike Americas' Volleyball Challenge, helping her team to qualify for the 2000 Sydney Olympics. Although the team placed fourth at the Olympics, Sykora was ranked second amongst all the players for her 123 digs, including a career-high 26 against Korea in the five-set quarterfinal win. In the bronze medal match against Brazil, Sykora posted her 1000th career dig.

=== 2001 ===
The following year, Sykora earned the Best Libero Award at the Montreux Volley Masters after leading both the serve-receive and digging categories. She was named the Best Digger at both the World Grand Prix and the World Grand Champions Cup, and earned the Best Receiver award at the NORCECA Championships. With her assistance, the team won first place at the NORCECA Championships, the World Grand Prix, and the World Championships Qualifying Cup.

At the close of the international competitive season, Sykora joined the professional volleyball team Mirabilandia Teodora Ravenna in Italy's Serie A1.

=== 2002 ===
In 2002, Sykora helped her team to the silver medal at the Women's Volleyball World Championships. She spent the offseason playing professionally for Starfin Ravenna in Italy's Serie A1.

=== 2003 ===
During the 2003 season, Sykora led the USA volleyball team in digs (533) and digs per set (3.46), and finished sixth on the team with 89 total points in 11 matches (85 kills, 3 blocks, 1 ace) as the United States went 8-3. Her team earned the gold medal at the Pan American Cup and the NORCECA Zone Championships and the bronze medal at the World Grand Prix and the World Cup, earning the USA a berth in the 2004 Athens Olympics. Sykora was named Best Digger at the Montreux Volley Masters.

=== 2004 ===
Although the US national team was ranked first entering the 2004 Athens Olympics, they played poorly, losing three of their first five matches (beating Germany and Cuba and losing to China, the Dominican Republic, and Russia). Their 2-3 record landed them the lowest seed in quarterfinal play, matching them with unbeaten Brazil. After losing their first two sets to Brazil in the quarterfinals, the US team won the next two, but dropped the final set to Brazil, 15-6, leaving the US team tied for fifth in the Games. Despite the team's lackluster showing, Sykora's performance earned her the Best Digger honor for the Olympic games. Following the Athens Games, Sykora left the US national team.

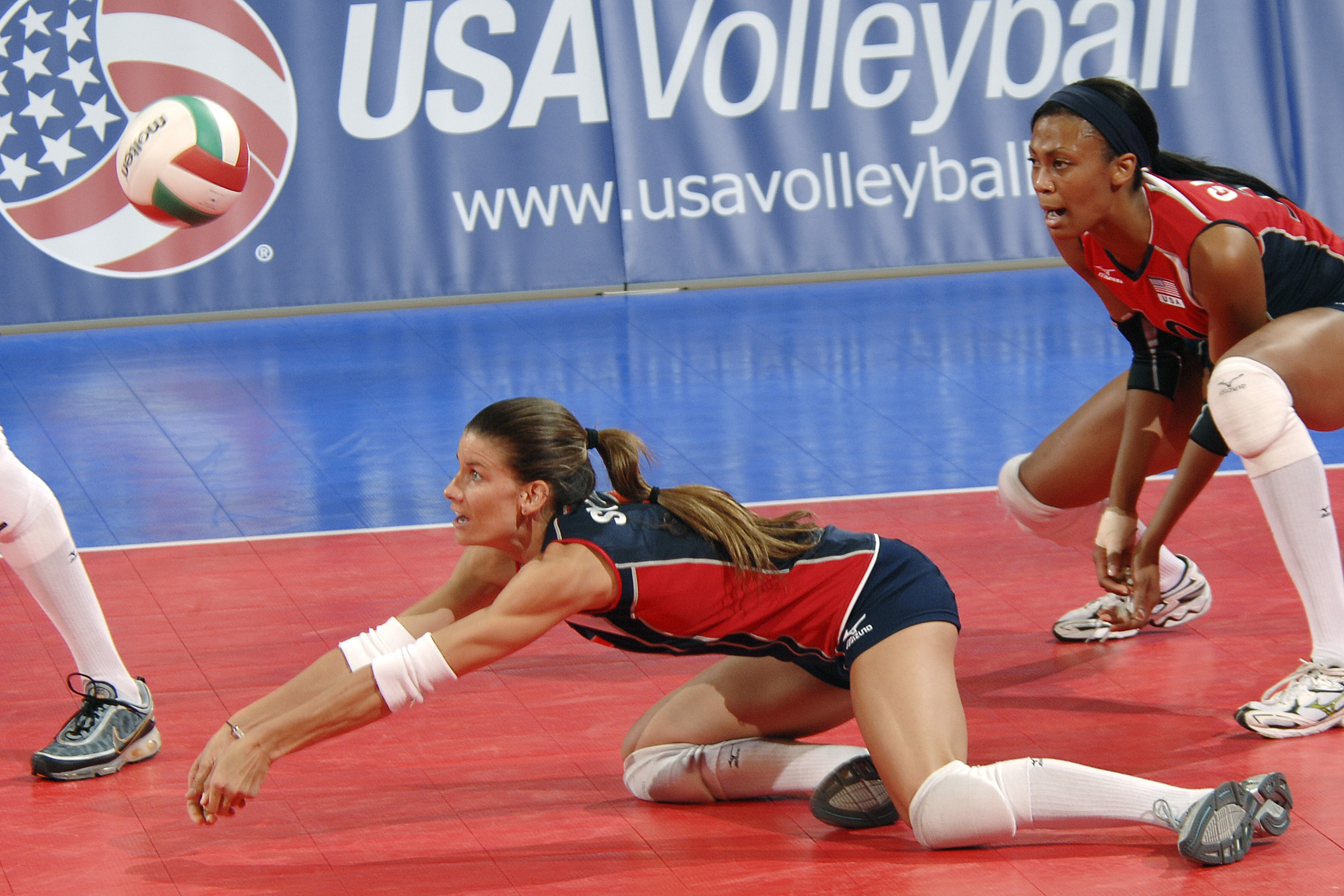
Sykora during a match with the U.S. women's national team

=== 2007 ===
After being three years away from the program, Sykora was named to the 12-player roster of the U.S. women's national team that played at the 2007 FIVB Women's World Cup in Japan. The top three teams at the world cup will play at the 2008 Summer Olympics in Beijing. The U.S. team finished in 3rd place. In the medal round, the team eventually reached the gold medal match, losing to Brazil and capturing the silver medal.

=== 2010 ===
She was named Best Digger and Best Libero at the 2010 World Championship.

=== 2011 ===
After some time playing for Brazilian volleyball team Vôlei Futuro, Sykora was injured when the bus carrying her team overturned on its way to the first match for the semifinals of the Brazilian Volleyball Superleague on April 12. She was taken to Hospital Sírio-Libanês where it was detected that she had head trauma and some bleeding in the left side of the brain. The player was sedated and admitted to the Intensive care unit. After a week in the ICU, Sykora's state had improved and she was able to breathe and eat on her own and could walk around the hospital's halls with the help of nurses. Sykora left the ICU and was transferred to a semi-intensive care unit on April 19. She was finally discharged from hospital on May 6.

=== 2012 ===
In December 2012, Sykora announced that she was retiring from professional volleyball playing, since she was not yet fully recovered from the accident she suffered while defending Vôlei Futuro. She still had problems with her eyesight and she lost some of her reflexes since that accident, which made playing volleyball as a Libero very difficult.

== Personal life ==
In 2012, Sykora came out as lesbian in an interview with Italian volleyball magazine Pallavoliamo, saying in part, "I have a girlfriend and I'm happy with her now. ... I'm happy and this is the most important thing."

== Awards ==
=== Individuals ===
- 2001 FIVB World Grand Prix "Best Digger"
- 2001 NORCECA Championship "Best Receiver"
- 2004 Olympic Games "Best Digger"
- 2010 FIVB Women's World Championship "Best Libero"
- 2010 FIVB Women's World Championship "Best Digger"
