= Claudia Torres =

Dominican footballer

Personal information
- Full name: Claudia Nicole Torres García
- Date of birth: 28 February 2000 (age 26)
- Place of birth: Mao, Dominican Republic
- Height: 1.65 m (5 ft 5 in)
- Position: Goalkeeper

Team information
- Current team: Bridgeport Purple Knights
- Number: 1

Youth career
- –2018: Taft School

College career
Years	Team	Apps	(Gls)
2019–	Bridgeport Purple Knights		

International career^{‡}
	Dominican Republic U20	1+	(0)
	Dominican Republic	2+	(0)
- ‡ National team caps and goals as of 2 October 2019

Claudia Nicole Torres García (born 28 February 2000) is a Dominican footballer who plays as a goalkeeper for American college Bridgeport Purple Knights and the Dominican Republic national team.

== International career ==
Torres has appeared for the Dominican Republic at the 2020 CONCACAF Women's Olympic Qualifying Championship qualification.
