= Sonia Benedito =

Brazilian volleyball player (born 1978)

Sônia Benedito
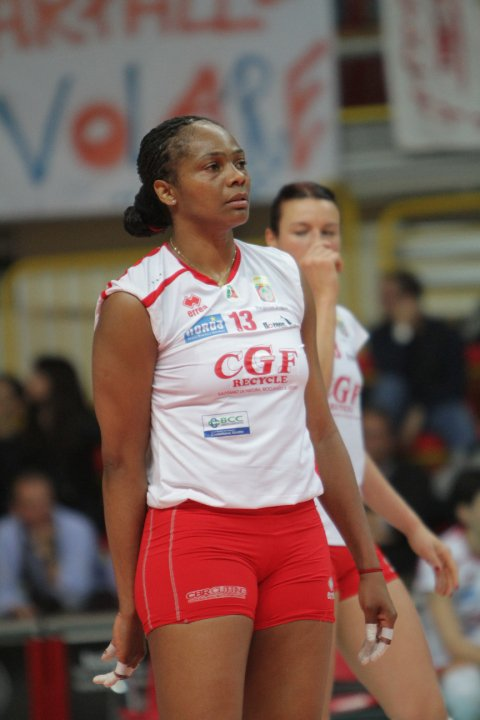

Personal information
- Full name: Sônia Benedito
- Born: 19 January 1978 (age 48); São Paulo, Brazil
- Height: 1.84 m (6 ft 0 in)
- Weight: 89 kg (196 lb)
- Spike: 306 cm (120 in)
- Block: 294 cm (116 in)

Volleyball information
- Position: Outside spiker

National team
2002	Brazil

Sonia Benedito (born 19 January 1978) is a retired Brazilian female volleyball player, who played as a wing spiker.

She was part of the Brazil women's national volleyball team at the 2002 FIVB Volleyball Women's World Championship in Germany. On club level she played with Fluminense Rio de Janeiro.

== Clubs ==
- Fluminense Rio de Janeiro (2002)
