= Maria Chivorchian =

Romanian volleyball player (born 1982)

Maria-Eugenia Chivorchian

Personal information
- Nationality: Romanian
- Born: 27 August 1982 (age 44)
- Height: 1.81 m (5 ft 11 in)

Volleyball information
- Position: universal
- Current club: Amici Bacau
- Number: 12 (national team)

National team
2002	Romania

Maria-Eugenia Chivorchian (born 27 August 1982) is a retired Romanian female volleyball player, who played as a universal. She is daughter of Gheorghe Chivorchian.

She was part of the Romania women's national volleyball team at the 2002 FIVB Volleyball Women's World Championship in Germany. On club level she played with Amici Bacau.

== Clubs ==
- Amici Bacau (2002)
