= Anika Schulz =

German volleyball player (born 1983)

Personal information
- Nationality: German
- Born: 22 June 1983 (age 43)
- Hometown: Germany
- Height: 1.80 m (5 ft 11 in)
- Weight: 68 kg (150 lb)
- Spike: 303 cm (119 in)
- Block: 281 cm (111 in)

Volleyball information
- Number: 10

Career
Years	Teams
2003	(Germany) Schweriner SC

National team
2004	Germany
Honours
Women's volleyball
Representing Germany

Anika Schulz (born 23 June 1983) was a German female volleyball player. She is retired. She was part of the German women's national volleyball team.

She competed with the national team at the 2003 FIVB World Grand Prix, and won the bronze medal at the 2003 Women's European Volleyball Championship in Ankara.

== Clubs ==
Schulz played for Schweriner SC since 1999 in the Bundesliga squad. She won in 2000, 2001 and 2002 the German championship and in 2001 the DVV Cup. In 2005, she moved to league rivals 1. VC Wiesbaden. Since 2008, she plays for the Swiss first division Volley Köniz, with whom she won the Swiss championship in 2009.
