= Sarah Noriega =

American volleyball player

Personal information
- Full name: Sarah Beth Noriega Sulentor
- Born: April 24, 1976 (age 50); Ulysses, Kansas, U.S.
- Height: 6 ft 2 in (1.87 m)
- Education: Loyola Marymount University

Volleyball information
- Position: Opposite
- Number: 16 (national team); 16 (Loyola Marymount University)

National team
1998–2004	United States
Medal record
Women's volleyball
Representing the United States
World Championship
Silver medal – second place	2002 Germany	Team
FIVB World Cup
Bronze medal – third place	2003 Japan	Team
FIVB World Grand Prix
Gold medal – first place	2001 Macau
Bronze medal – third place	2003 Andria
Bronze medal – third place	2004 Reggio Calabria
Pan American Games
Bronze medal – third place	1999 Winnipeg	Team
NORCECA Championship
Gold medal – first place	2001 Santo Domingo
Gold medal – first place	2003 Santo Domingo

Sarah Beth Noriega (Sulentor) (born April 24, 1976) is an American former volleyball player, a collegiate champion, and an Olympic athlete.

== Early life ==
Noriega graduated in 1994 from Ulysses High School, in the small town of Ulysses, Kansas. There, she played on the volleyball team under coach Courtney Eslick, who described her as the best athlete he had ever coached. Though her high school team did not win any major championships, Noriega became a three-time WAC all-conference athlete, and, while playing for Ulysses High School, was a two-time all-state selection. She helped win Program-of-the-Year honors for her school for the 1992–93 season from the Kansas Volleyball Association.

== Collegiate and beyond ==
Noriega played for Loyola Marymount University from 1994 to 1997, helping lead the team to three consecutive WCC championships, and was named the 1997 West Coast Conference Player of the Year.

Noriega played with the US National team, participating in the 1995 U.S. Olympic Festival, the World Games, the 2000 Olympics, and the 2002 World Championships.

== 2000 Summer Olympics ==
At the 2000 Summer Olympics in Sydney, Noriega played for the United States national team as an "outside position player". With her as a starting player, her team defeated the teams from China, Kenya and Croatia before facing the Australia team - with Noriega, by then, having competed in 108 international competitions and three world championships. Noreiga also participated in the USA defeat of teams from South Korea and Australia; however, two losses to Brazil and one to Russia pushed the team just outside the medals, ranking fourth in the 2000 Olympics.

== Honors and awards ==
=== Collegiate ===
- 1997 West Coast Conference (WCC) Player of the Year
- 1997–98 school year: LMU's Female Athlete of the Year
- All-District VIII honoree (three times)
- AVCA First Team All-American
- Volleyball Magazine All-American
- 1998 (February) Volleyball Magazine National Player of the Month
- All-West Coast Conference First Team selection (three-time)
- 2007 (October 13) fifth volleyball player in LMU history to have her number retired
- 2009 Loyola Marymount Hall of Fame

=== Other ===
- 2000 U.S. Olympian
- 2012 Kansas Volleyball Association Hall of Fame

== Records and stats ==
NCAA records:

- Most kills in a four-set match (47 kills on November 7, 1997, against San Diego)
- 1997-1998 Senior year: 614 kills, and led the nation with a kill average of 6.90

Loyola Marymount rankings, as of 2009:

- second in kill average (4.71)
- third in attack percentage (.319)
- third in one-year kills (614)
- third in one-year kill average (6.90)
- fourth all-time in kills (1,446)

Extensive details on her performance stats are found at the Loyola Marymount Lions website, in the article about her induction to the LMU Hall of Fame.
