= Ingy Hamdy =

Egyptian volleyball player (born 1986)

Personal information
- Nationality: Egyptian
- Born: 6 June 1986 (age 40)
- Height: 1.76 m (5 ft 9 in)

Volleyball information
- Position: middle blocker
- Current club: El Shams Kairo
- Number: 10 (national team)

National team
2002	Egypt

Ingy Hamdy (born 6 June 1986) is a retired Egyptian female volleyball player, who played as a middle blocker.

She was part of the Egypt women's national volleyball team at the 2002 FIVB Volleyball Women's World Championship in Germany. On club level she played with El Shams Kairo.

== Clubs ==
- El Shams Kairo (2002)
