= Rasha Elsayed =

Egyptian volleyball player (born 1981)

Personal information
- Nationality: Egyptian
- Born: 4 February 1981 (age 45)
- Height: 1.74 m (5 ft 9 in)

Volleyball information
- Position: libero
- Current club: Zamalek SC
- Number: 7 (national team)

National team
2002	Egypt

Rasha Elsayed (born 4 February 1981) is a retired Egyptian female volleyball player, who played as a libero. She was part of the Egypt women's national volleyball team at the 2002 FIVB Volleyball Women's World Championship in Germany. On club level she played with Zamalek SC.

== Clubs ==
- Zamalek SC (2002)
