= Amina Fouad =

Egyptian volleyball player (born 1980)

Personal information
- Nationality: Egyptian
- Born: 4 October 1980 (age 46)
- Height: 1.86 m (6 ft 1 in)
- Weight: 73 kg (161 lb)
- Spike: 297 cm (117 in)
- Block: 287 cm (113 in)

Volleyball information
- Current club: Elahly
- Number: 3 (national team)

National team
2002	Egypt

Amina Fouad (born 4 October 1980) is a retired Egyptian female volleyball player.

She was part of the Egypt women's national volleyball team at the 2002 FIVB Volleyball Women's World Championship in Germany. On club level she played with Elahly.

== Clubs ==
- Elahly (2002)
