= Joanna Szeszko =

Polish volleyball player (born 1974)

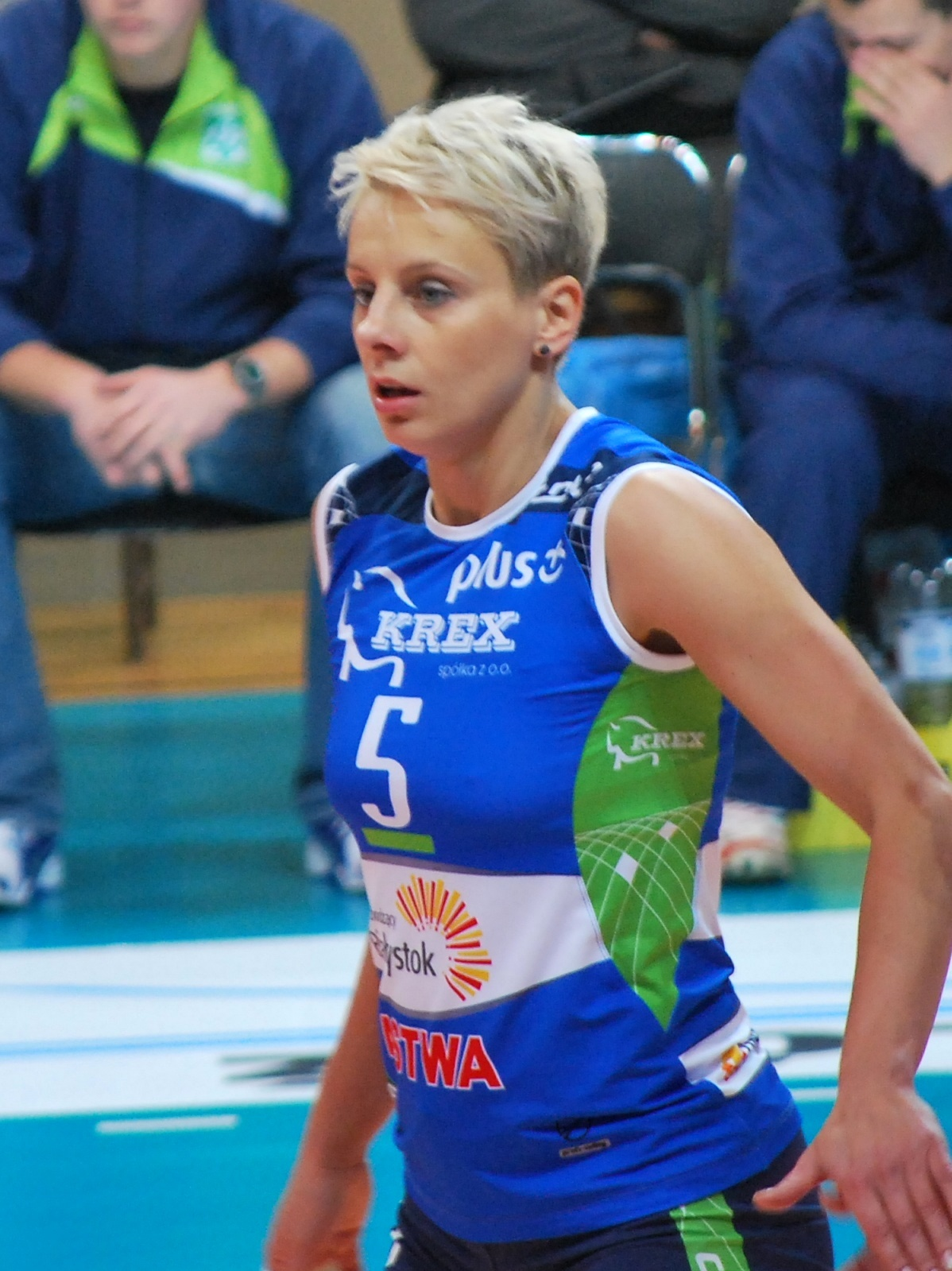
- Szeszko in 2010

Personal information
- Nationality: Polish
- Born: 14 June 1974 (age 52)
- Height: 1.80 m (5 ft 11 in)

Volleyball information
- Position: universal
- Current club: SKRA Warschau
- Number: 3 (national team)

National team
2002	Poland

Joanna Szeszko (born 14 June 1974) is a retired Polish volleyball player, who played as a universal.

She was part of the Poland women's national volleyball team at the 2002 FIVB Volleyball Women's World Championship in Germany. On club level she played with SKRA Warschau.

== Clubs ==
- SKRA Warschau (2002)
