= Marina Daloca =

Brazilian volleyball player (born 1979)

Personal information
- Nationality: Brazilian
- Born: 8 September 1979 (age 47)
- Hometown: Rio de Janeiro
- Height: 1.85 m (6 ft 1 in)
- Weight: 75 kg (165 lb)
- Spike: 305 cm (120 in)
- Block: 299 cm (118 in)

Volleyball information
- Position: Middle-blocker
- Current club: Minas T. C.
- Number: 6 (national team)

National team
2005	Brazil

Marina Daloca (born 8 September 1979) is a Brazilian female volleyball player, who played as a middle blocker.

She was part of the Brazil women's national volleyball team at the 2002 FIVB Volleyball Women's World Championship in Germany.

On club level she played with Minas Tênis Clube.

== Clubs ==
Club	From	To
Brazil Universidade de Guarulhos	1998-1999	1998-1999
Brazil Força Olímpica	1999-2000	1999-2000
Brazil Grêmio de Vôlei Osasco	2000-2001	2000-2001
Brazil Minas Tênis Clube	2001-2002	2002-2003
Brazil Rio de Janeiro Volêi Clube	2003-2004	2003-2004
Brazil EC Pinheiros	2004-2005	2004-2005
Brazil Rio de Janeiro Volêi Clube	2005-2006	2005-2006
Brazil Minas Tênis Clube	2006-2007	2007-2008
Brazil AD Brusque	2008-2009	2008-2009
Brazil EC Pinheiros	2009-2010	2010-2011
Brazil Sesi-SP	2011-2012	2012-2013
