= Jennifer Hiller =

Australian volleyball player (born 1979)

Personal information
- Nationality: Australian
- Born: 12 February 1979 (age 47)
- Height: 1.69 m (5 ft 7 in)

Volleyball information
- Position: libero
- Current club: Eastside Hawks
- Number: 6 (national team)

National team
2002	Australia

Jennifer Hiller (born 12 February 1979) is a retired Australian volleyball player, who played as a libero.

She was part of the Australia women's national volleyball team at the 2002 FIVB Volleyball Women's World Championship in Germany. On club level she played with Eastside Hawks.

== Clubs ==
- Monash University (2002)
