= Cristina Piña =

Argentine writer (born 1949)

Cristina Sara Piña (born 1949) is an Argentine poet and literary scholar. She was born in Buenos Aires and studied at the University of Salvador and obtained a Master of Arts in Contemporary Thought at CAECE University. Since 1977, she has taught at the Universidad Nacional Mar del Plata.

A prolific writer and translator, she has published numerous books and academic papers. Starting with her debut collection in 1979, she has 14 poetry books and a novel to her name. She is considered to be a leading scholar on the life and work of Alejandra Pizarnik. As a translator, she has translated several dozen works of fiction and non-fiction from English and French into Spanish. She has also translated the plays of Shakespeare, Synge, Ionesco and Tennessee Williams.
