= Milada Spalova =

Milada Spalova may refer to:

- Milada Spalová (born 1979), Czech volleyball player
- Milada Špálová (1884–1963), Czech painter
