= Jana Kalcikova =

Czech volleyball player (born 1980)

Personal information
- Nationality: Czech
- Born: 22 January 1980 (age 46)
- Height: 1.92 m (6 ft 4 in)
- Weight: 72
- Spike: 315
- Block: 304

Volleyball information
- Current club: PVK Olymp Prague
- Number: 11 (national team)

National team
| 2002 | Czech Republic |

Jana Kalcikova (born 22 January 1980) is a Czech female former volleyball player. She was part of the Czech Republic women's national volleyball team.

She participated at the 2002 FIVB Volleyball Women's World Championship in Germany. On club level she played with PVK Olymp Prague.

== Clubs ==
- PVK Olymp Prague (2002)
