= Mycock =

Mycock is a surname. Notable people with the surname include:

- David Mycock (1921–1990), English footballer
- David Mycock (born 1969), English footballer
- Joe Mycock (1916–2004), English rugby union player
- Tommy Mycock (1923–1988), English footballer
