= Lucy Suazo =

Dominican Republic volleyball player (born 1981)

Lucy Suazo Pérez (born August 16, 1981, in San Cristóbal) is a female volleyball player from the Dominican Republic, who played with the women's national team at the 2002 World Championship in Germany. Her team finished in the 13th place. She played for her native country, wearing the #6 jersey.

Suazo played as Libero for Universidad de Burgos in the 2008–2009 season.

== Clubs ==
- (Dominican Republic) Los Cachorros (1990)
- (Dominican Republic) Los Cachorros (1992)
- (Spain) Granada (2000)
- (Dominican Republic) Los Cachorros (2001)
- (Spain) Cronos Alcobendas (2007–2008)
- (Spain) Universidad de Burgos (2008–2009)
- (Spain) GH Voley Ecay (2009–2010)
