= Elena Koleva =

Bulgarian volleyball player

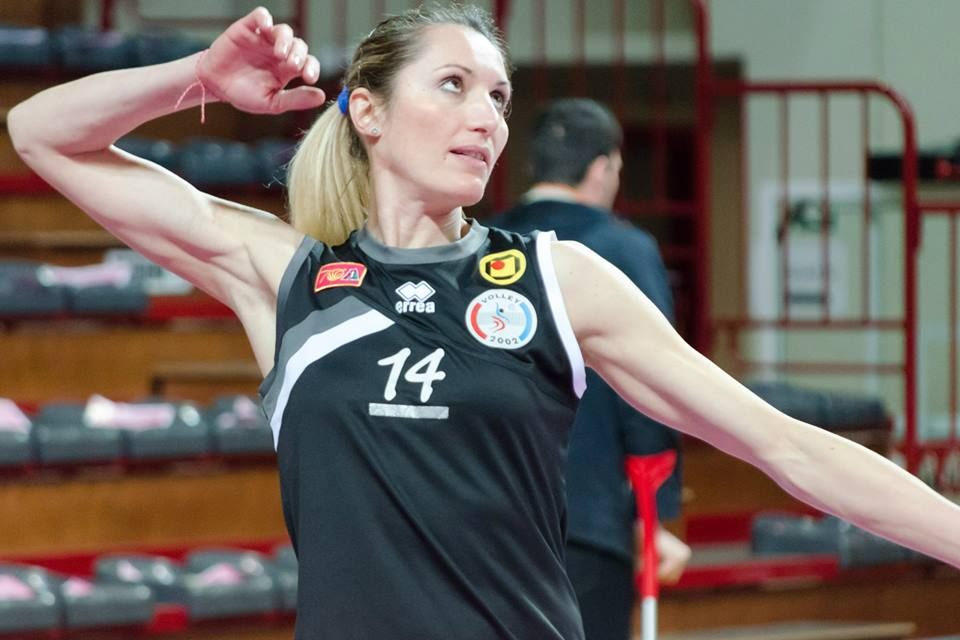

Personal information
- Nationality: Bulgaria
- Born: 1 December 1977 (age 48)
- Height: 1.86 m (6 ft 1 in)
- Weight: 75 kg (165 lb)
- Spike: 304 cm (120 in)
- Block: 298 cm (117 in)

Elena Koleva (born December 1, 1977) is a retired Bulgarian volleyball player. She plays in countries like Italy, Germany and Greece.

She participated at the 2002 FIVB Volleyball Women's World Championship in Germany. As of 2014, she plays for Il Bisonte San Casciano.
