= Jana Šenková =

Czech volleyball player (born 1982)

Jana Šenková Napolitano
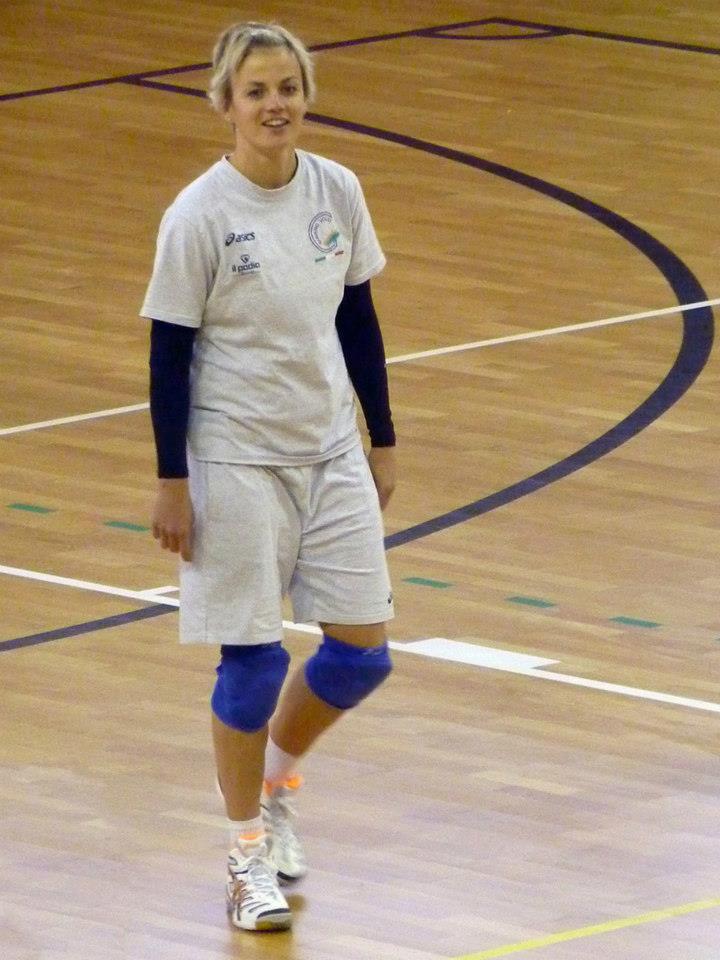

Personal information
- Nationality: Czech
- Born: 7 November 1982 (age 43)
- Height: 1.82 m (6 ft 0 in)
- Weight: 73
- Spike: 299
- Block: 286

Volleyball information
- Current club: SK UP Olomouc
- Number: 11 (national team)

National team
| 2002 | Czech Republic |

Jana Šenková Napolitano (born 7 November 1982) is a retired Czech female volleyball player. She was part of the Czech Republic women's national volleyball team.

She participated at the 2002 FIVB Volleyball Women's World Championship in Germany. On club level she played with SK UP Olomouc.

== Career ==
Jana Šenková's career, began in 1998, playing for SK UP Olomouc, a club with which he was tied for five seasons; In 2002 he joined the Czech national team. In the 2003-04 season, she went to Policejní Volejbalový klub Olymp Praha, where he remained for three years, winning one league title and two domestic cups . In the 2006-07 season, she moved to Italy, hired by Robur Tiboni Volley Urbino in Serie A2, while in the following yearn she was wearing the jersey of Life Volley Milano. In the 2008-09 season, she went to Parma Volley Girls, where he stayed for three seasons, winning the 2008-09 Serie A Cup of Italy and getting promotion in Serie A1, at the end of the 2010-11 season.

However, she decided to retire at the end of the championship, as well as leaving the national team at the end of the 2009 European Championship. After a year of inactivity, she returned to volleyball in the 2012-13 season, hired by the Giapono Volley Cup, newly promoted to Serie A1, while in the following season she returned to the Czech league in the Olomouc team.

== Family ==
She married coach Bruno Napolitano.

== Clubs ==
- SK UP Olomouc (2002)
