= Adrienne Marie =

Australian volleyball player (born 1972)

Personal information
- Nationality: Australian
- Born: 20 November 1972 (age 53)
- Height: 1.82 m (6 ft 0 in)

Volleyball information
- Position: wing spiker
- Current club: University of Technology, Sydney
- Number: 1 (national team)

National team
2002	Australia

Adrienne Marie (born 20 November 1972) was an Australian female volleyball player, who played as a wing spiker. In 2003, she starting competing in beach volleyball.

She was part of the Australia women's national volleyball team at the 2002 FIVB Volleyball Women's World Championship in Germany. On club level she played with University of Technology, Sydney.

== Clubs ==
- University of Technology, Sydney (2002)
