= Luciana Nascimento =

Brazilian volleyball player (born 1980)

Personal information
- Nationality: Brazilian
- Born: 7 June 1980 (age 46)
- Height: 1.89 m (6 ft 2 in)

Volleyball information
- Position: wing spiker
- Current club: EC Pinheiros
- Number: 2 (national team)

National team
2002	Brazil

Luciana Nascimento (born 7 June 1980) is a retired Brazilian female volleyball player, who played as a wing spiker.

She was part of the Brazil women's national volleyball team at the 2002 FIVB Volleyball Women's World Championship in Germany. On club level she played with EC Pinheiros.

== Clubs ==
- EC Pinheiros (2002)
