= Noralvis Aguilera =

Cuban volleyball player (born 1982)

Personal information
- Full name: Noralvis Aguilera Fergunzon
- Nationality: Cuban
- Born: 5 November 1982 (age 43)
- Height: 1.79 m (5 ft 10 in)
- Weight: 69 kg (152 lb)
- Spike: 310 cm (122 in)
- Block: 312 cm (123 in)

Volleyball information
- Position: libero

National team
2002-2003	Cuba

Noralvis Aguilera Fergunzon (born 5 November 1982) is a Cuban volleyball player.

She competed with the Cuba women's national volleyball team at the 2003 FIVB World Grand Prix She played for club team Camaguey.
