= Kenia Olvera =

Mexican volleyball player (born 1975)

Personal information
- Nationality: Mexican
- Born: 6 May 1975 (age 51)
- Height: 1.85 m (6 ft 1 in)
- Weight: 74 kg (163 lb)
- Spike: 295 cm (116 in)
- Block: 275 cm (108 in)

Volleyball information
- Position: middle blocker
- Current club: UNAM
- Number: 5 (national team)

National team
2002-2003	Mexico

Kenia Olvera (born 6 May 1975) is a retired Mexican female volleyball player, who played as a middle blocker.

She was part of the Mexico women's national volleyball team at the 2002 FIVB Volleyball Women's World Championship in Germany. She also competed at the 2002 Central American and Caribbean Games and 2003 Women's Pan-American Volleyball Cup. On club level she played with UNAM.

== Clubs ==
- UNAM (2002)
