= Atika Bouagaa =

German volleyball player (born 1982)

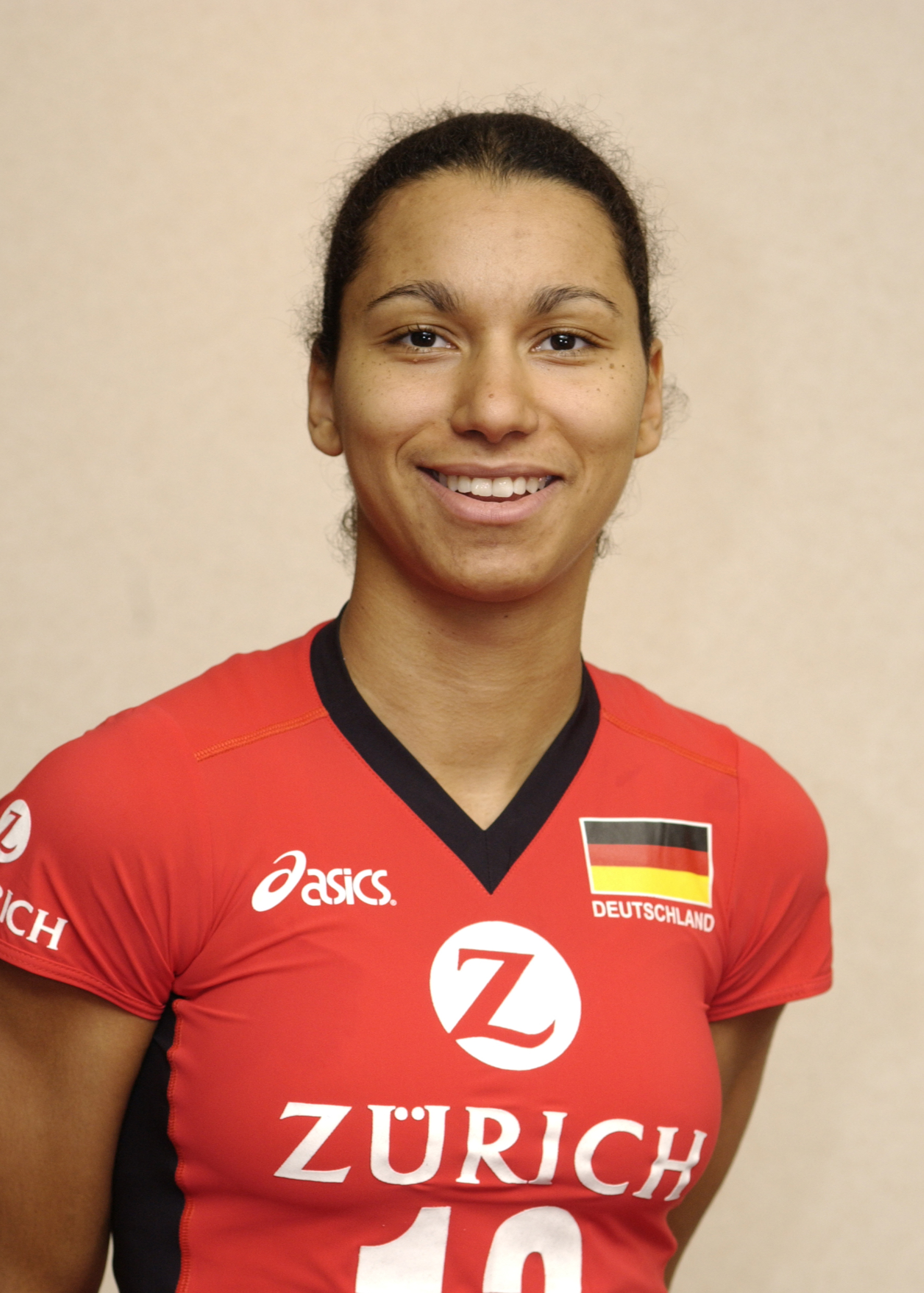

Personal information
- Nickname: Bougi
- Nationality: German
- Born: 22 May 1982 (age 44); Baden-Württemberg, West Germany
- Height: 181 cm (5 ft 11 in)
Honours
Women's volleyball
Representing Germany
European Championship
Bronze medal – third place	2003 Ankara	Team competition
FIVB Grand Prix
Bronze medal – third place	2002 Hong Kong	Team competition

Atika Bouagaa (born 22 May 1982) is a German volleyball player.

Standing at 181 centimetres (5 ft 11 in) and nicknamed "Bougi", she has played as an outside-hitter for the German Women's National Team since 2002.

She represented her native country at the 2004 Summer Olympics, finishing in ninth place, at the 2002 FIVB Volleyball Women's World Championship in Germany, and at the 2003 Women's European Volleyball Championship, finishing third. On club level she played with Dresdner SC.

== Honours ==
- 2002 FIVB World Grand Prix — 3rd place
- 2002 World Championship — 10th place
- 2003 European Championship — 3rd place
- 2004 Olympic Games — 9th place
- 2006 World Championship — 11th place
- 2007 European Championship — 6th place
