= Marcelle Moraes =

Brazilian volleyball player

Marcelle
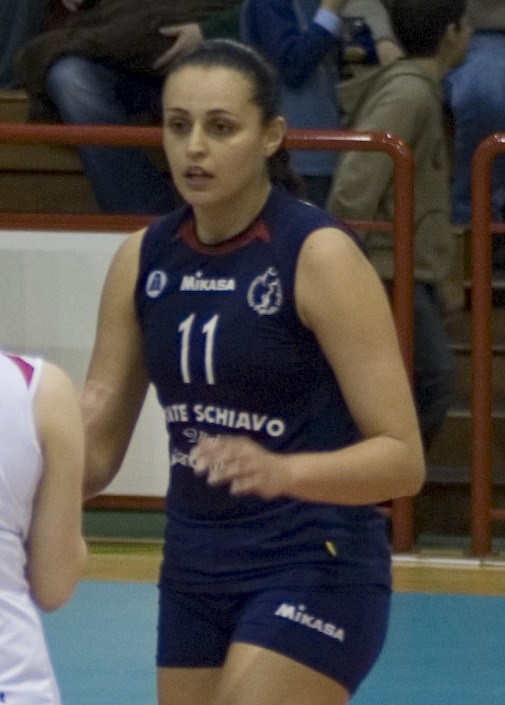

Personal information
- Full name: Marcelle Mendes Rodrigues
- Nickname: Marcelle
- Born: 17 October 1976 (age 50); Lavras, Minas Gerais, Brazil
- Hometown: São Paulo
- Height: 181 cm (5 ft 11 in)
- Weight: 72 kg (159 lb)
- Spike: 303 cm (119 in)
- Block: 289 cm (114 in)

Volleyball information
- Position: Setter
- Current club: Retired

National team
1995–2006	Brazil
Medal record
Women's volleyball
Representing Brazil
World Grand Champions Cup
Gold medal – first place	2005 Japan
World Grand Prix
Gold medal – first place	2005 Sendai
Gold medal – first place	2006 Reggio Calabria
South American Championship
Gold medal – first place	2001 Morón
Gold medal – first place	2005 La Paz

Marcelle Mendes Rodrigues (born 17 October 1976 in Lavras) is a Brazilian volleyball player, playing as a setter.

She was a member of Brazilian team at the 1995 Pan-American Games at Mar del Plata, and the 2002 FIVB World Championship. Also she participated in the 2005 FIVB World Grand Prix, the 2006 FIVB World Grand Prix, the 2005 FIVB Women's World Grand Champions Cup and the 2005 Montreux Volley Masters.

== Clubs ==
- (Brazil) Minas Tênis Clube (1995–1996)
- (Brazil) Leites Nestlé (1996–1997)
- (Brazil) Club Athletico Paulistano (1997–1998)
- (Brazil) Osasco (1998–2002)
- (Brazil) São Caetano (2002–2003)
- (Brazil) ACF/Campos (2003–2005)
- (Brazil) Macaé Sports (2005–2006)
- (France) RC Cannes (2006–2007)
- (Italy) Monte Schiavo Jesi (2007–2008)
- (Russia) VC Zarechye Odintsovo (2008–2009)

== Awards ==
=== Individual ===
- 2002 FIVB World Grand Prix – "Best Setter"
- 2002 FIVB World Championship – "Best Setter"
