= Suphap Phongthong =

Thai volleyball player (born 1982)

Personal information
- Nationality: Thailand
- Born: 16 May 1982 (age 44)
- Height: 1.78 m (5 ft 10 in)

Volleyball information
- Position: Middle Blocker
- Current club: Pepsi Bangkok

National team
- Years: Team
- 1999-2004: Thailand

Suphap Phongthong (Thai: สุภาพ ผงทอง, born 16 May 1982) is a retired Thai female volleyball player, who played as a middle blocker.

She was part of the Thailand women's national volleyball team at the 2002 FIVB Volleyball Women's World Championship in Germany. On club level she played with Pepsi Bangkok.

== Clubs ==
- Pepsi Bangkok (2002)
