= Olessya Kulakova =

German volleyball player (born 1977)

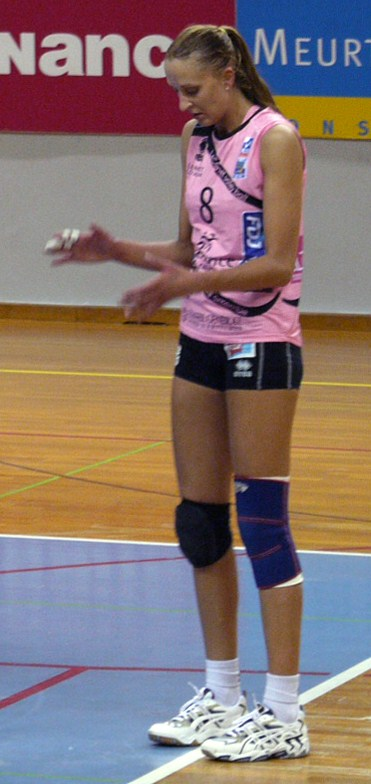

Personal information
- Full name: Olessya Kulakova
- Nationality: German
- Born: January 31, 1977 (age 49); Almaty, Kazakh SSR, Soviet Union
Honours
Women's volleyball
Representing Germany
European Championship
Bronze medal – third place	2003 Ankara	Team competition
FIVB Grand Prix
Bronze medal – third place	2002 Hong Kong	Team competition

Olessya Kulakova (born January 31, 1977, in Almaty) is a Kazakhstani-German volleyball player. She played as a middle blocker for the German Women's National Team.

Kulakova represented her adopted country at the 2004 Summer Olympics, finishing in ninth place, and at the 2002 FIVB Volleyball Women's World Championship in Germany. On the club level she played with Schweriner SC.
