= Nurak Nokputta =

Thai volleyball player (born 1982)

Personal information
- Nationality: Thailand
- Born: 31 January 1982 (age 44)
- Height: 1.78 m (5 ft 10 in)

Volleyball information
- Position: Opposite Hitter
- Current club: Pepsi Bangkok

National team
- Years: Team
- 1999-2005: Thailand

Nurak Nokputta (Thai: นุรักษ์ นกพุทธา, born 31 January 1982) is a retired Thai female volleyball player, who played as a wing spiker.

She was part of the Thailand women's national volleyball team at the 2002 FIVB Volleyball Women's World Championship in Germany. At the club level, she played with Pepsi Bangkok.

== Clubs ==
- Pepsi Bangkok (2002)

== See also ==
- Thailand women's national volleyball team
