= Heba Rabie =

Egyptian volleyball player (born 1983)

Personal information
- Nationality: Egyptian
- Born: 14 February 1983 (age 43)
- Height: 1.73 m (5 ft 8 in)

Volleyball information
- Position: middle blocker
- Current club: AL Shams Club
- Number: 4 (Club level) & 13 (national team)

National team
2002	Egypt

Heba Rabie (born 14 February 1983) is an Egyptian retired volleyball player, who played as a middle blocker. She was part of the Egypt women's national volleyball team at the 2002 FIVB Volleyball Women's World Championship in Germany. On club level she played with AL Shams Club.

== Clubs ==
- AL Shams Club (2002)
