= Valentina Borrelli =

Italian volleyball player (born 1978)

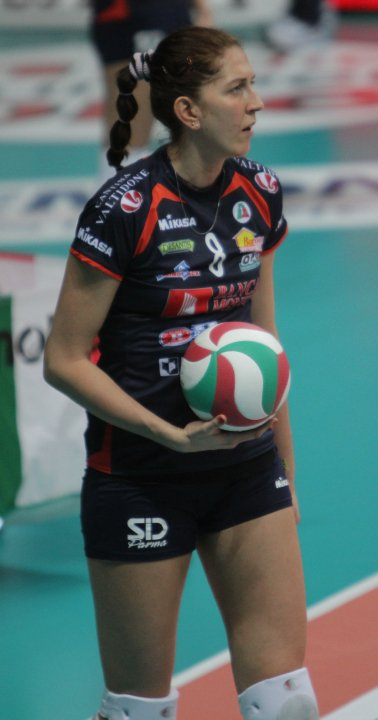

Medal record

Women's volleyball

Representing Italy

World Championship
Gold medal – first place	2002 Berlin	Team competition

Valentina Borrelli (born 30 October 1978 in Milan) is a female volleyball player, who claimed the gold medal with the women's national team at the 2002 World Championship in Germany. She played as a wing-spiker, wearing the number 15 jersey. She made her international debut on 17 May 1996 in a match against the All Stars (2-3). Borrelli was the captain of River Volley Piacenza in 2010.

== Other biographics ==
- family name = Borrelli
  * given name = Valentina
  * nationality = Italy
  * date of birth = 1978-10-30 (30 October 1978)
  * birthplace = Milan
  * occupation = volleyball player
  (since 1993)
  * previous team = River Volley Piacenza
  * height = 190 cm
  (6 feet and 2.8 inches)
  * weight = 71 kg
  (157 pounds)
  * laterality of sports = left-handed
  * laterality of writing = left-handed

== Honours ==
- 2002 World Championship — 1st place
- 2003 FIVB World Grand Prix — 5th place
