= Rachele Sangiuliano =

Italian volleyball player (born 1981)

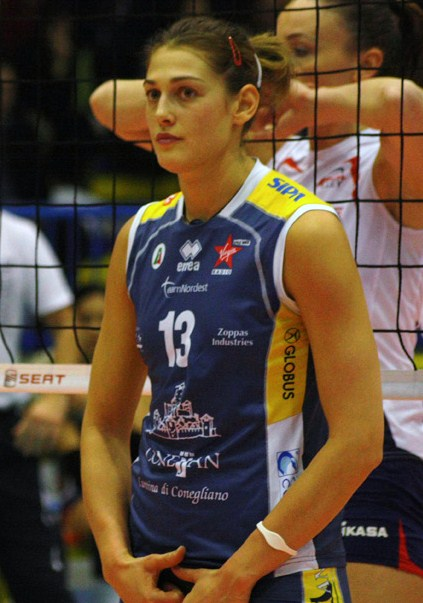

Medal record

Women's volleyball

Representing Italy

World Championship
Gold medal – first place	2002 Germany	Team

Rachele Sangiuliano (born 23 June 1981 in Noventa di Piave) is a retired female volleyball player who represented Italy in the early 2000s. She was a member of the Women's National Team that won the gold medal at the 2002 World Championship in Germany. After retiring from volleyball, she became a television presenter. Sangiuliano was inducted into the Italian Volleyball Hall of Fame in 2022.
