= Yndys Novas =

Dominican Republic volleyball player

Personal information
- Full name: Yndys Novas Guzmán
- Nationality: Dominican
- Born: 7 November 1977 (age 48) Santo Domingo
- Home town: Santo Domingo
- Height: 1.86 m (6 ft 1 in)
- Weight: 71 kg (157 lb)
- Spike: 302 cm (119 in)
- Block: 300 cm (120 in)
Beach volleyball information
- Years: Teammate
- –: Judith Arias

Indoor volleyball information
- Position: Wing spiker

National team
- Years: Team
- 1998–2002: Dominican Republic
Honours
Women's volleyball
Representing the Dominican Republic
Central American and Caribbean Games
Gold medal – first place	2002 San Salvador	Team
Silver medal – second place	1998 Maracaibo	Team
- Updated on September 2010

Yndys Novas Guzmán (born 7 November 1977 in Santo Domingo) is a retired volleyball player from the Dominican Republic, who competed for her native country at the 1998 and 2002 World Championships, wearing the number #8 jersey.

There she ended up in 12th and 13th places with the national team. Novas played as a wing spiker and as a libero.

== Career ==
She won the silver medal at the volleyball tournament during the 1998 Central American and Caribbean Games with her senior national team.

== Beach volleyball ==
In 2003, she participated along with Judith Arias at the Pan American Games beach volleyball tournament, finishing 9th.

== Clubs ==
- (Dominican Republic) Mirador (1997–)
