= Judith Sylvester =

German volleyball player (born 1977)

Personal information
- Nationality: German
- Born: 13 October 1977 (age 49)
- Height: 1.93 m (6 ft 4 in)
- Weight: 85 kg (187 lb)
- Spike: 312 cm (123 in)
- Block: 296 cm (117 in)

Volleyball information
- Number: 16

Career
Years	Teams
2004	(Italy) Properzi Volley Lodi

National team
2004	Germany Germany
Honours
Women's volleyball
Representing Germany
European Championship
Bronze medal – third place	2003 Ankara	Team competition
FIVB Grand Prix
Bronze medal – third place	2002 Hong Kong	Team competition

Judith Sylvester (born 13 October 1977) is a German volleyball player. She was part of the Germany women's national volleyball team.

She competed with the national team She played at the 2002 FIVB Volleyball Women's World Championship in Germany, and the 2004 Summer Olympics in Athens, Greece. She played with Properzi Volley Lodi in 2004.

== Clubs ==
- (Italy) Properzi Volley Lodi (2004)

== See also ==
- Germany at the 2004 Summer Olympics
