= Marcia González =

Mexican volleyball player (born 1975)

Personal information
- Nationality: Mexican
- Born: 10 February 1975 (age 51)
- Height: 1.74 m (5 ft 9 in)

Volleyball information
- Position: setter
- Current club: UNAM

National team
2002	Mexico

Marcia González (born 10 February 1975) is a retired Mexican female volleyball player, who played as a setter.

She was part of the Mexico women's national volleyball team at the 2002 FIVB Volleyball Women's World Championship in Germany. She also competed at the 2002 Central American and Caribbean Games. On club level she played with UNAM.

== Clubs ==
- (Mexico) UNAM (2002)
