= Tolotear Lealamanua =

Australian volleyball player (born 1983)

Personal information
- Nationality: Australian
- Born: 21 March 1983 (age 43)
- Height: 1.86 m (6 ft 1 in)

Volleyball information
- Position: middle blocker
- Current club: University of Technology, Sydney
- Number: 9 (national team)

National team
- Years: Team
- 2002: Australia

Tolotear Lealamanua (born 21 March 1983) is a retired Australian female volleyball player, who played as a middle blocker.

She was part of the Australia women's national volleyball team at the 2002 FIVB Volleyball Women's World Championship in Germany. On club level she played with University of Technology, Sydney.

== Clubs ==
- University of Technology, Sydney (2002)
