= Marion Frías =

Mexican volleyball player

Personal information
- Nationality: Mexico
- Born: 19 January 1982 (age 44)
- Height: 1.91 m (6 ft 3 in)
- Weight: 105 kg (231 lb)
- Spike: 305 cm (120 in)
- Block: 296 cm (117 in)

Volleyball information
- Number: 13

Career
Years	Teams
2014	(Mexico) Distrito Federal

Marion Frías (born 19 January 1982) is a retired Mexican female volleyball player. She is a member of the Mexico women's national volleyball team and played for Distrito Federal in 2014.

She was part of the Mexico national team at the 2002 FIVB Volleyball Women's World Championship, and at the 2014 FIVB Volleyball Women's World Championship in Italy.

== Clubs ==
- (Mexico) Distrito Federal (2014)
