= Francien Huurman =

Dutch volleyball player (born 1975)

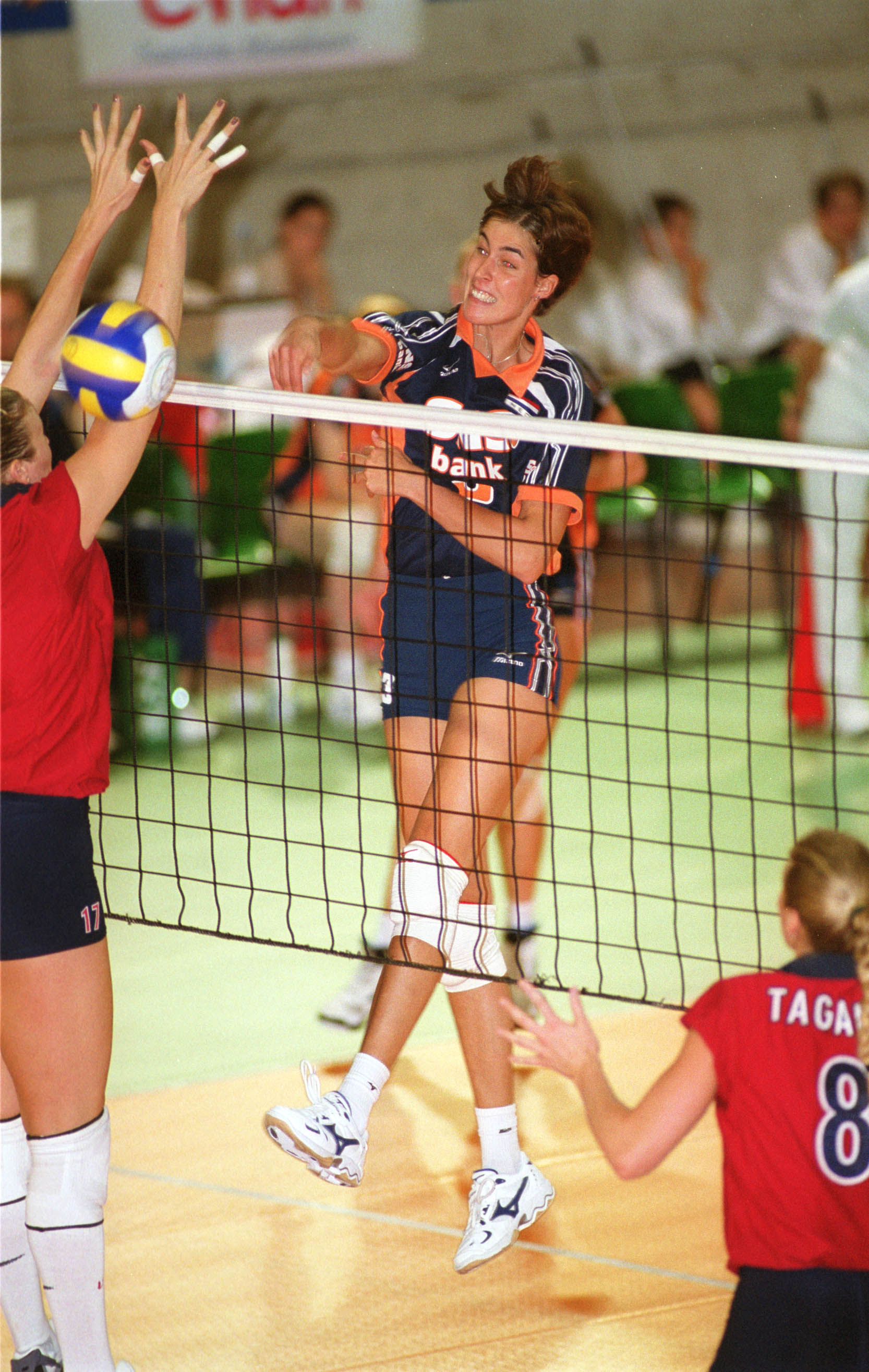

Personal information
- Full name: Francien Huurman
- Born: 18 April 1975 (age 51); Pijnacker, South Holland, Netherlands
- Height: 1.92 m (6 ft 4 in)
- Weight: 80 kg (176 lb)
- Spike: 313 cm (123 in)
- Block: 292 cm (115 in)

Volleyball information
- Position: Middle Blocker

National team
Netherlands
Honours
Women's volleyball
Representing the Netherlands
European Championship
Silver medal – second place	2009 Poland	Team competition
FIVB World Grand Prix
Gold medal – first place	2007 Ningbo	Team competition

Francien Huurman (born 18 April 1975 in Pijnacker, South Holland) is a volleyball player from the Netherlands, who plays as a middle-blocker. She was a member of the Dutch National Women's Team that won the gold medal at the FIVB World Grand Prix 2007 in Ningbo, PR China.

On 21 November 2011 Hitachi Rivale announced her joining.
