= Anna Maycock =

Australian volleyball player

- Born: Adelaide, Australia
- Education: Heathfield High School
- Known for: Volleyball
- Height: 182 cm (6 ft 0 in)

Anna Maycock was the captain of the Australia women's national volleyball team and successful international volleyball representative from South Australia. Maycock has been a member of the National Senior program since 2001, after getting her start in the National Junior program in 1997. She also has played professionally in Europe playing with USSPA-Volley in Albi, France and teams in the German Bundesliga.

Maycock competed internationally at the 2002 World Championship Leipzig, Germany and Asian Championships since 2001 and the World University Games in 2001 and 2005. She has represented South Australia in the Australian Volleyball League since 2009 and plays for Mt Lofty Club at State League level.

== Career highlights ==
- Youth Australian National Team
- Australian National Team
- Captain of Australian National Team since 2004
- 2012 Tanya Tarnogurski Trophy (State League Women Best & Fairest)
