= Tanja Hart =

German volleyball player (born 1974)

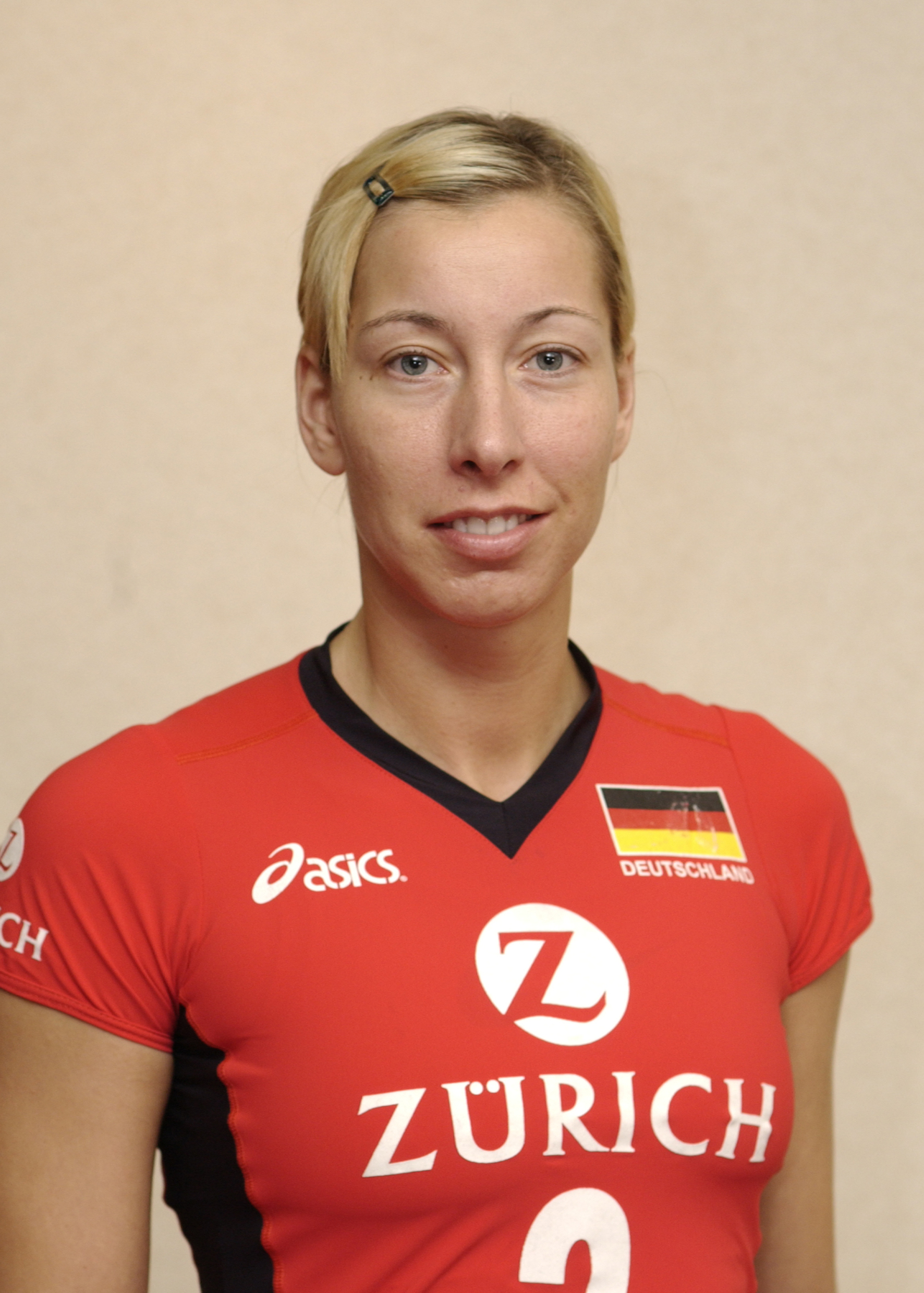
- Tanja Hart

Personal information
- Nationality: German
- Born: 24 January 1974 (age 52); Marktheidenfeld, West Germany
Honours
Women's volleyball
Representing Germany
European Championship
Bronze medal – third place	2003 Ankara	Team competition

Tanja Hart (born 24 January 1974) is a German retired volleyball player who made her debut for the German Women's National Team in 1995.

She represented her native country in three consecutive Summer Olympics, starting in 1996. She played also at the 1998 FIVB Volleyball Women's World Championship, at the 2002 FIVB Volleyball Women's World Championship in Germany, and at the 2003 Women's European Volleyball Championship. On club level she played with Dresdner SC.

After retiring in 2007 to become a schoolteacher (English, sports) she briefly came back to help Germany at the 2008 Olympic qualification tournament in her home country, which would be her 4th Olympics, but after losing narrowly in the semis she completely retired.

== Honours ==
- 1995 European Championship — 4th place
- 1996 Olympic Games — 8th place
- 1998 World Championship — 13th place
- 1999 European Championship — 4th place
- 2000 Olympic Games — 6th place
- 2001 European Championship — 9th place
- 2002 World Championship — 10th place
- 2003 European Championship — 3rd place
- 2004 Olympic Games — 9th place
- 2006 World Championship — 11th place
