= Yoslan Muñoz =

Cuban volleyball player (born 1980)

Personal information
- Full name: Yoslan Munoz Garcia
- Nationality: Cuban
- Born: 9 February 1980 (age 46)
- Height: 1.83 m (6 ft 0 in)
- Weight: 72 kg (159 lb)
- Spike: 326 cm (128 in)
- Block: 312 cm (123 in)

Volleyball information
- Position: Universal
- Current club: Ciudad Habana

National team
- Years: Team
- 2002-2003: Cuba

Yoslan Muñoz Garcia (born February 9, 1980) is a Cuban volleyball player.

She competed with the Cuba women's national volleyball team at the 2002 FIVB Volleyball Women's World Championship in Germany, and the 2002 FIVB Volleyball World Grand Prix. She played for club team Ciudad Habana.
