= Irina Donets =

Dutch volleyball player (born 1976)

Personal information
- Born: 20 August 1976 (age 50)
- Hometown: Amsterdam
- Height: 1.86 m (6 ft 1 in)
- Weight: 75 kg (165 lb)
- Spike: 296 cm (117 in)
- Block: 285 cm (112 in)

Volleyball information
- Position: middle blocker
- Current club: Ravenna
- Number: 10

National team
Netherlands

Irina Donets (born 20 August 1976) is a volleyball player from the Netherlands.

== Career ==
She was a member of the Dutch National Women's Team. She participated at the 2002 FIVB Volleyball Women's World Championship.

== Clubs ==
- 1998 - 2001 AMVJ Amstelveen
- 2001 - 2003 Teodora Ravenna
