= 2009 Women's European Volleyball Championship squads =

This article shows all participating team squads at the 2009 Women's European Volleyball Championship, held in the Poland from 25 September to 4 October 2009.

== Pool A ==
=== Croatia ===
- Head Coach: Miroslav Aksentijević

| No. | Name | Date of birth | 2009 club |
|---|---|---|---|
| 2 | Ana Grbac | 23 March 1988 | (Croatia) ŽOK Rijeka |
| 4 | Marina Miletić | 21 February 1983 | (Croatia) ŽOK Rijeka |
| 5 | Mirela Delić | 13 November 1981 | (Turkey) Beşiktaş Istanbul |
| 6 | Sanja Popović | 31 May 1984 | (Italy) Chieri Volley |
| 7 | Cecilia Dujić | 6 December 1987 | (Croatia) ŽOK Split 1700 |
| 8 | Mia Jerkov | 14 May 1986 | (Italy) BV Nocera Umbra |
| 10 | Marina Katić | 1 October 1983 | (Greece) Iraklis Thessaloniki |
| 11 | Katarina Barun | 1 December 1983 | (Romania) CSU Metal Galați |
| 12 | Senna Ušić | 14 May 1986 | (Italy) Pallavolo Cesena |
| 15 | Ivana Miloš | 7 March 1986 | (Croatia) ŽOK Rijeka |
| 17 | Jelena Alajbeg | 1 October 1989 | (Romania) CSU Metal Galați |
| 18 | Maja Poljak | 2 May 1983 | (Turkey) Türk Telekom Ankara |

=== Netherlands ===
- Head Coach: Avital Selinger

| No. | Name | Date of birth | 2009 club |
|---|---|---|---|
| 1 | Kim Staelens | 7 January 1982 | (Italy) Sirio Perugia |
| 2 | Monique Wismeijer | 21 October 1978 | (Netherlands) AMVJ Amstelveen |
| 3 | Francien Huurman | 18 April 1975 | (Netherlands) Martinus Amstelveen |
| 4 | Chaïne Staelens | 7 November 1980 | (Russia) Dinamo Moscow |
| 5 | Robin De Kruijf | 5 May 1991 | (Netherlands) Martinus Amstelveen |
| 6 | Maret Grothues | 16 September 1988 | (Netherlands) Martinus Amstelveen |
| 8 | Alice Blom | 7 April 1980 | (Italy) GSO Villa Cortese |
| 10 | Janneke van Tienen | 29 May 1979 | (Italy) Sirio Perugia |
| 11 | Caroline Wensink | 4 August 1984 | (Netherlands) Martinus Amstelveen |
| 12 | Manon Flier | 8 February 1984 | (Italy) Pieralisi Jesi |
| 15 | Ingrid Visser | 4 June 1977 | (Russia) Leningradka Saint Petersburg |
| 16 | Debby Stam | 24 July 1984 | (Russia) Universitet Belgorod |

=== Poland ===
- Head Coach: Jerzy Matlak

| No. | Name | Date of birth | 2009 club |
|---|---|---|---|
| 1 | Anna Barańska | 14 May 1984 | (Poland) SSK Calisia Kalisz |
| 2 | Mariola Barbachowska | 3 July 1982 | (Poland) MKS Muszynianka |
| 3 | Anna Woźniakowska | 2 March 1982 | (Poland) SSK Calisia Kalisz |
| 4 | Dorota Pykosz | 22 October 1978 | (Poland) MKS Muszynianka |
| 5 | Natalia Bamber | 24 February 1982 | (Poland) BKS Bielsko-Biała |
| 6 | Agnieszka Bednarek | 20 February 1986 | (Poland) PTPS Piła |
| 7 | Izabela Bełcik | 29 November 1980 | (Poland) MKS Muszynianka |
| 12 | Milena Sadurek | 18 October 1984 | (Poland) PTPS Piła |
| 13 | Paulina Maj | 22 March 1987 | (Poland) PTPS Piła |
| 15 | Katarzyna Biel | 21 September 1981 | (Poland) BKS Bielsko-Biała |
| 16 | Aleksandra Jagieło | 2 June 1980 | (Poland) MKS Muszynianka |
| 17 | Joanna Kaczor | 16 September 1984 | (Poland) Gwardia Wrocław |
| ? | Eleonora Staniszewska | 25 October 1978 | (Poland) BKS Bielsko-Biała |
| ? | Klaudia Kaczorowska | 20 December 1988 | (Poland) PTPS Piła |

=== Spain ===
- Head Coach: Gido Vermeulen

| No. | Name | Date of birth | 2009 club |
|---|---|---|---|
| 1 | Elena García | 12 August 1979 | (Italy) Pallavolo Donoratico |
| 4 | Ana Ramírez | 4 November 1981 | (Spain) CV Diego Porcelos |
| 5 | Romina Lamas | 29 August 1978 | (Spain) CAV Murcia 2005 |
| 6 | Ana Mirtha Correa | 19 January 1985 | (Spain) Aguere S. Cristóbal |
| 7 | Amaranta Fernández | 11 August 1983 | (Italy) Santeramo Sport |
| 8 | Yasmina Hernández | 24 April 1984 | (Spain) Club Voleibol Tenerife |
| 10 | Sara Hernández | 12 September 1986 | (Spain) CV Albacete |
| 11 | Diana Sánchez | 7 March 1977 | (Spain) CV Albacete |
| 12 | Lucía Paraja | 10 February 1983 | (Spain) Club Voleibol Tenerife |
| 15 | Mireya Delgado | 5 November 1991 | (Spain) CAEP Soria |
| 16 | Sara González | 16 November 1984 | (Spain) CV Diego Porcelos |
| 17 | Arkía El-Ammari | 9 October 1976 | (Spain) Club Voleibol Tenerife |

== Pool B ==
=== France ===
- Head Coach: Fabrice Vial

| No. | Name | Date of birth | 2009 club |
|---|---|---|---|
| 2 | Véronika Hudima | 8 July 1988 | (France) Stella ES Calais |
| 3 | Félicia Menara | 23 June 1991 | (France) IFVB Toulouse |
| 4 | Christina Bauer | 1 January 1988 | (France) ASPTT Mulhouse |
| 6 | Amandine Mauricette | 1 June 1985 | (France) Vennelles VB |
| 8 | Pauline Soullard | 24 April 1985 | (France) La Rochette Volley |
| 9 | Anna Rybaczewski | 23 March 1982 | (France) ASPTT Mulhouse |
| 10 | Maëva Orlé | 8 May 1991 | (France) IFVB Toulouse |
| 11 | Armelle Faesch | 26 December 1981 | (France) ASPTT Mulhouse |
| 12 | Déborah Ortschitt | 10 June 1987 | (France) ASPTT Mulhouse |
| 13 | Alexia Djilali | 27 October 1987 | (France) ASPTT Mulhouse |
| 14 | Séverine Liénard | 19 February 1979 | (Germany) VT Hamburg |
| 15 | Séverine Szewczyk | 29 June 1976 | (France) ES Le Cannet |
| 16 | Estelle Quérard | 19 March 1979 | (France) ES Le Cannet |
| 17 | Jelena Lozančić | 26 March 1983 | (France) ES Le Cannet |

=== Germany ===
- Head Coach: Giovanni Guidetti

| No. | Name | Date of birth | 2009 club |
|---|---|---|---|
| 2 | Kathleen Weiß | 2 February 1984 | (Netherlands) Martinus Amstelveen |
| 4 | Kerstin Tzscherlich | 15 February 1978 | (Germany) Dresdner SC |
| 5 | Lisa Thomsen | 20 August 1985 | (Germany) USC Münster |
| 6 | Kathy Radzuweit | 2 March 1982 | (Italy) Pallavolo Donoratico |
| 7 | Heike Beier | 9 December 1983 | (Italy) River Piacenza |
| 10 | Anne Matthes | 30 April 1985 | (Germany) Dresdner SC |
| 11 | Christiane Fürst | 29 March 1985 | (Italy) Robursport Pesaro |
| 12 | Lena Möllers | 6 January 1990 | (Germany) Olympia Berlin |
| 13 | Sarah Petrausch | 31 July 1990 | (Germany) Olympia Berlin |
| 15 | Maren Brinker | 10 July 1986 | (Germany) Bayer Leverkusen |
| 16 | Margareta Kozuch | 30 October 1986 | (Italy) Asystel Novara |
| 18 | Corina Ssuschke | 9 May 1983 | (Italy) Pallavolo Cesena |

=== Italy ===
- Head Coach: Massimo Barbolini

| No. | Name | Date of birth | 2009 club |
|---|---|---|---|
| 4 | Lucia Crisanti | 16 March 1986 | (Italy) Sirio Perugia |
| 5 | Giulia Rondon | 10 October 1987 | (Italy) Sassuolo Volley |
| 6 | Enrica Merlo | 28 December 1988 | (Italy) Volley Bergamo |
| 8 | Jenny Barazza | 24 July 1981 | (Italy) Volley Bergamo |
| 9 | Manuela Secolo | 22 February 1977 | (Greece) Olympiakos Piraeus |
| 10 | Paola Cardullo | 18 March 1982 | (Italy) Asystel Novara |
| 11 | Serena Ortolani | 7 January 1987 | (Italy) Volley Bergamo |
| 12 | Francesca Piccinini | 10 January 1979 | (Italy) Volley Bergamo |
| 13 | Valentina Arrighetti | 25 January 1985 | (Italy) Volley Bergamo |
| 14 | Eleonora Lo Bianco | 22 December 1979 | (Italy) Volley Bergamo |
| 15 | Antonella Del Core | 5 November 1980 | (Italy) Volley Bergamo |
| 16 | Lucia Bosetti | 9 July 1989 | (Italy) Sassuolo Volley |
| 17 | Simona Gioli | 17 September 1977 | (Russia) Dinamo Moscow |
| 18 | Taismary Agüero | 5 March 1977 | (Turkey) Türk Telekom Ankara |

=== Turkey ===
- Head Coach: Alessandro Chiappini

| No. | Name | Date of birth | 2009 club |
|---|---|---|---|
| 1 | Pelin Çelik | 23 May 1982 | (Turkey) Karşıyaka Izmir |
| 3 | Nihan Yeldan | 7 February 1982 | (Turkey) VakıfGüneş Istanbul |
| 7 | Gizem Güreşen | 14 January 1987 | (Turkey) Galatasaray Istanbul |
| 8 | Bahar Toksoy | 6 February 1988 | (Turkey) VakıfGüneş Istanbul |
| 9 | Deniz Hakyemez | 3 February 1983 | (Turkey) VakıfGüneş Istanbul |
| 10 | Gözde Kırdar | 26 June 1985 | (Turkey) VakıfGüneş Istanbul |
| 11 | Naz Aydemir | 14 August 1990 | (Turkey) Eczacıbaşı Istanbul |
| 12 | Esra Gümüş | 2 October 1982 | (Turkey) Eczacıbaşı Istanbul |
| 13 | Neriman Özsoy | 13 March 1988 | (Turkey) Eczacıbaşı Istanbul |
| 14 | Eda Erdem | 22 February 1987 | (Turkey) Fenerbahçe Istanbul |
| 16 | İpek Soroğlu | 12 March 1985 | (Turkey) Beşiktaş Istanbul |
| 17 | Neslihan Demir | 9 December 1983 | (Turkey) VakıfGüneş Istanbul |
| ? | Meryem Boz | 3 February 1988 | (Turkey) İller Bankası Ankara |
| ? | Elif Onur | 20 December 1989 | (Turkey) Nilüfer Bursa |

== Pool C ==
=== Belarus ===
- Head Coach: Nikolay Karpol

| No. | Name | Date of birth | 2009 club |
|---|---|---|---|
| 1 | Marina Tumas | 17 September 1984 | (Turkey) Fenerbahçe Istanbul |
| 2 | Volha Palcheuskaya | 6 December 1984 | (Belarus) Minchanka Minsk |
| 3 | Yuliya Markouskaya | 29 May 1982 | (Belarus) Kovrovschik Brest |
| 5 | Natallia Puzyr | 28 July 1988 | (Belarus) Kommunalnik Grodno |
| 6 | Ekaterina Skrabatun | 23 April 1987 | (Switzerland) Voléro Zürich |
| 7 | Iryna Lebedzeva | 14 January 1973 | (Russia) Nadezhda Serpukhov |
| 8 | Oksana Aksenava | 8 August 1983 | (Belarus) Atlant Baranovichi |
| 9 | Kacjaryna Zakreŭskaja | 29 September 1986 | (Belarus) Atlant Baranovichi |
| 10 | Alena Hendzel | 21 September 1984 | (Poland) PTPS Piła |
| 11 | Hanna Shauchenka | 14 January 1979 | (Belarus) Atlant Baranovichi |
| 12 | Aksana Kavalchuk | 23 November 1979 | (Russia) Indesit Lipetsk |
| 14 | Viktoryia Abukhovich | 30 January 1989 | (Belarus) Neman Grodno |

=== Belgium ===
- Head Coach: Gert Vande Broek

| No. | Name | Date of birth | 2009 club |
|---|---|---|---|
| 2 | Freya Aelbrecht | 10 February 1990 | (Belgium) Asterix Kieldrecht |
| 3 | Frauke Dirickx | 3 January 1980 | (Romania) CSU Metal Galați |
| 4 | Yana De Leeuw | 6 September 1990 | (Belgium) Asterix Kieldrecht |
| 6 | Charlotte Leys | 18 March 1989 | (Belgium) Asterix Kieldrecht |
| 7 | Liesbet Vindevoghel | 29 December 1979 | (Italy) BV Nocera Umbra |
| 9 | Virginie De Carne | 25 May 1977 | (Russia) Spartak Omsk |
| 11 | Griet Van Vaerenbergh | | (Belgium) Asterix Kieldrecht |
| 12 | Marta Szczygielska | 28 September 1981 | (Poland) PTPS Piła |
| 14 | Gwendoline Horemans | 16 September 1987 | (Germany) USC Münster |
| 16 | Hélène Rousseaux | 25 September 1991 | (Belgium) EVC Vilvoorde |
| 17 | Els Vandesteene | 30 May 1987 | (Belgium) VDK Gent Dames |
| 19 | Jolien Wittock | 22 February 1990 | (Czech Republic) VK Prostějov |

=== Bulgaria ===
- Head Coach: Dragan Nešić

| No. | Name | Date of birth | 2009 club |
|---|---|---|---|
| 3 | Tanya Sabkova | 10 June 1988 | (Bulgaria) Levski Siconco Sofia |
| 4 | Evelina Tsvetanova | 22 April 1974 | (Cyprus) Anorthosis Famagusta |
| 5 | Aneta Germanova | 3 January 1975 | (Italy) Tiboni Urbino |
| 6 | Tsvetelina Zarkova | 18 December 1986 | (Germany) Raben Vilsbiburg |
| 8 | Eva Yaneva | 31 July 1985 | (France) RC Cannes |
| 9 | Lyubka Debarlieva | 21 September 1980 | (Bulgaria) Levski Siconco Sofia |
| 11 | Radostina Chitigoi | 3 September 1978 | (Romania) Tomis Constanța |
| 13 | Mariya Filipova | 10 September 1982 | (Romania) CSU Metal Galați |
| 14 | Elena Koleva | 1 December 1977 | (Italy) River Piacenza |
| 16 | Elitsa Vasileva | 13 May 1990 | (Italy) Sirio Perugia |
| 17 | Strashimira Filipova | 18 August 1985 | (France) RC Cannes |
| 18 | Iliyana Petkova | 10 November 1977 | (Italy) FV Castellana Grotte |

=== Russia ===
- Head Coach: Vladimir Kuzyutkin

| No. | Name | Date of birth | 2009 club |
|---|---|---|---|
| 1 | Maria Borodakova | 8 March 1986 | (Russia) Dinamo Moscow |
| 2 | Anna Makarova | 2 April 1984 | (Russia) Samorodok Khabarovsk |
| 3 | Maria Zhadan | 6 February 1983 | (Russia) Universitet Belgorod |
| 4 | Elena Konstantinova | 25 August 1981 | (Russia) Dinamo Yantar Kaliningrad |
| 7 | Natalya Safronova | 6 February 1979 | (Russia) Dinamo Moscow |
| 8 | Yulia Merkulova | 17 February 1984 | (Russia) Zarechie Odintsovo |
| 9 | Olga Fateeva | 4 May 1984 | (Russia) Zarechie Odintsovo |
| 10 | Yuliya Sedova | 8 January 1985 | (Russia) Avtodor-Metar |
| 11 | Ekaterina Gamova | 17 October 1980 | (Russia) Dinamo Moscow |
| 12 | Marina Sheshenina | 26 June 1985 | (Russia) Uralochka-NTMK |
| 14 | Ekaterina Kabeshova | 5 August 1986 | (Russia) Leningradka Saint Petersburg |
| 15 | Tatiana Kosheleva | 23 December 1988 | (Russia) Zarechie Odintsovo |
| ? | Ksenia Naumova | 1 February 1990 | (Russia) Zarechie Odintsovo |
| ? | Ekaterina Starodubova | 19 October 1984 | (Russia) Universitet Belgorod |

== Pool D ==
=== Azerbaijan ===
- Head Coach: Faig Garaev

| No. | Name | Date of birth | 2009 club |
|---|---|---|---|
| 1 | Darya Zamanova | 30 April 1987 | (Azerbaijan) Azərreyl Baku |
| 2 | Kseniya Kovalenko | 21 November 1986 | (Azerbaijan) Azərreyl Baku |
| 4 | Oksana Parkhomenko | 28 July 1984 | (Turkey) Fenerbahçe Istanbul |
| 7 | Yelena Parkhomenko | 11 September 1982 | (Azerbaijan) Azərreyl Baku |
| 8 | Natavan Gasimova | 8 July 1985 | (Azerbaijan) Azərreyl Baku |
| 9 | Natalya Mammadova | 2 December 1984 | (Turkey) Türk Telekom Ankara |
| 10 | Oksana Mammadyarova | 6 April 1978 | (Azerbaijan) Azərreyl Baku |
| 11 | Lidiya Maksimenko | 19 March 1981 | (Azerbaijan) Azərreyl Baku |
| 12 | Valeriya Korotenko | 29 January 1984 | (Turkey) Fenerbahçe Istanbul |
| 15 | Aynur Kərimova | 7 December 1988 | (Azerbaijan) Nagliyatchi Baku |
| 16 | Shafag Karimova | 15 October 1988 | (Azerbaijan) Lokomotiv Baku |
| 17 | Polina Rəhimova | 5 June 1990 | (Azerbaijan) Azərreyl Baku |

=== Czech Republic ===
- Head Coach: Táňa Krempaská

| No. | Name | Date of birth | 2009 club |
|---|---|---|---|
| 1 | Vendula Adlerova | 24 April 1984 | (Spain) Club Voleibol Tenerife |
| 4 | Aneta Havlíčková | 3 July 1987 | (Netherlands) Volleybalclub Weert |
| 5 | Julie Jášová | 14 September 1987 | (Czech Republic) Královo Pole Brno |
| 7 | Michaela Hasalíková | 18 April 1984 | (Italy) GSO Villa Cortese |
| 8 | Tereza Matuszková | 3 December 1982 | (Italy) FV Busto Arsizio |
| 9 | Anna Kallistová | 30 October 1982 | (Czech Republic) PVK Olymp Prague |
| 11 | Michaela Jelínková | 2 December 1985 | (Germany) USC Münster |
| 13 | Markata Tomanova | 10 February 1982 | (Czech Republic) VK Prostějov |
| 14 | Lucie Muehlsteinova | 15 October 1984 | (Poland) AZS Białystok |
| 15 | Jana Šenková | 11 July 1982 | (Italy) Parma Volley |
| 16 | Helena Havelková | 25 July 1988 | (Italy) Sassuolo Volley |
| 17 | Ivana Plchotová | 22 October 1982 | (Poland) MKS Muszynianka |

=== Serbia ===
- Head Coach: Zoran Terzić

| No. | Name | Date of birth | 2009 club |
|---|---|---|---|
| 1 | Jelena Nikolić | 13 April 1982 | (Turkey) VakıfGüneş Istanbul |
| 2 | Jovana Brakočević | 5 March 1988 | (Italy) Spes Conegliano |
| 3 | Ivana Ðerisilo | 8 August 1983 | (Romania) CSU Metal Galați |
| 5 | Nataša Krsmanović | 19 June 1985 | (Turkey) Galatasaray Istanbul |
| 6 | Jasna Majstorović | 23 April 1984 | (Serbia) OK Poštar Belgrado |
| 7 | Brižitka Molnar | 28 July 1985 | (Romania) CSU Metal Galați |
| 8 | Ana Antonijević | 26 August 1987 | (Serbia) OK Poštar Belgrado |
| 9 | Jovana Vesović | 21 June 1987 | (Serbia) OK Poštar Belgrado |
| 10 | Maja Ognjenović | 6 August 1984 | (Italy) Pieralisi Jesi |
| 11 | Stefana Veljković | 9 January 1990 | (Serbia) OK Poštar Belgrado |
| 16 | Milena Rašić | 25 October 1990 | (Serbia) Dinamo Pančevo |
| 17 | Silvija Popović | 15 March 1986 | (Serbia) OK Poštar Belgrado |
| 18 | Suzana Ćebić | 9 November 1984 | (Spain) Club Voleibol Tenerife |

=== Slovakia ===
- Head Coach: Miroslav Čada

| No. | Name | Date of birth | 2009 club |
|---|---|---|---|
| 1 | Daniela Rojková | 16 April 1984 | (Czech Republic) VK Prostějov |
| 3 | Jana Gogolová | 27 January 1984 | (France) Stella ES Calais |
| 4 | Tatiana Crkoňová | 7 January 1992 | (Slovakia) Doprastav Bratislava |
| 5 | Veronika Hrončeková | 2 January 1990 | (Slovakia) Slávia UK Bratislava |
| 7 | Monika Smák | 29 August 1973 | (Poland) Pałac Bydgoszcz |
| 8 | Martina Konečná | 11 June 1983 | (Austria) Schwechat Post |
| 10 | Solange Soares | 1 July 1980 | (Czech Republic) VK Prostějov |
| 12 | Simona Kohútová-Kleskeňová | 4 April 1980 | unattached |
| 13 | Ivana Bramborová | 11 April 1985 | (Czech Republic) VK Prostějov |
| 14 | Miroslava Kuciaková | 31 January 1989 | (Slovakia) Doprastav Bratislava |
| 15 | Martina Viestová | 21 May 1984 | (Slovakia) Doprastav Bratislava |
| 16 | Martina Noseková | 1 April 1985 | (Czech Republic) Královo Pole Brno |

Source: Slovenská Volejbalová Federácia (SVF)
