= 2007 Women's European Volleyball Championship squads =

Wikimedia project list

This article shows all participating team squads at the 2007 Women's European Volleyball Championship, held in Luxembourg and Belgium from September 20 to September 30, 2007.

== Pool A ==
=== Azerbaijan ===
- Head Coach: Faig Garayg

#	Name	Date of Birth	Weight	Height	Spike	Block
1	Darya Zamanova
4	Oksana Guliyeva	28.07.1984	77	184	300	290
6	Irina Siminyagina	29.11.1984	71	182	295	280
7	Yelena Parkhomenko	11.09.1982	68	186	300	293
8	Natavan Gasimova	08.07.1985	64	176	287	275
9	Natalya Mammadova	02.12.1984	75	195	305	298
10	Shafag Karimova
11	Inessa Korkmaz	17.01.1972	78	190	299	293
12	Valeriya Korotenko	29.01.1984	62	171	260	255
14	Lada Maksimova
15	Aynur Karimova	07.12.1988	66	189	290	280
17	Polina Rahimova

=== Belarus ===
- Head Coach: Vladimir Koslov

#	Name	Date of Birth	Weight	Height	Spike	Block
1	Marina Tumas
2	Volha Palcheuskaya
3	Iryna Lebedzeva
5	Viktoryia Hurava
6	Darya Yermashevich
7	Volha Maroz
8	Aksana Aksenava
9	Katsiaryna Zakreuskaya
10	Alena Hendzel
11	Alena Hurkova
12	Aksana Kavalchuk
13	Tatsiana Hardzeyeva

=== Germany ===
- Head Coach: Giovanni Guidetti

#	Name	Date of Birth	Weight	Height	Spike	Block
1	Maren Brinker
2	Kathleen Weiß	02.02.1984	66	171	290	273
4	Kerstin Tzscherlich	15.02.1978	72	179	295	282
7	Heike Beier	09.12.1983	72	184	310	296
8	Cornelia Dumler	22.01.1982	68	180	309	285
9	Mareen Apitz	26.03.1987	73	183
11	Christiane Fürst	29.03.1985	76	192	305	291
13	Atika Bouagaa	22.05.1982	69	181	306	289
14	Kathy Radzuweit	02.03.1982	72	196	319	300
15	Angelina Grün	02.12.1979	74	185	309	287
16	Margareta Kozuch	30.10.1986	70	187	309	297
18	Corina Ssuschke	09.05.1983	70	188	304	292

=== Italy ===
- Head Coach: Massimo Barbolini

#	Name	Date of Birth	Weight	Height	Spike	Block
1	Simona Gioli	17.09.1977	72	185	307	283
3	Paola Croce	06.03.1978	52	167	290	265
6	Valentina Fiorin	09.10.1984	69	187	305	287
7	Martina Guiggi	01.05.1984	69	188	315	290
8	Jenny Barazza	24.09.1981	77	188	300	285
9	Manuela Secolo	22.02.1977	70	180	302	279
11	Serena Ortolani	07.01.1987	63	187	308	288
12	Taismary Agüero	05.03.1977	69	177	322	300
13	Francesca Ferretti	15.02.1984	70	180	296	280
14	Eleonora Lo Bianco	22.12.1979	70	172	287	273
15	Antonella Del Core	05.11.1980	73	180	296	279
17	Paola Cardullo	18.03.1982	56	162	275	268

== Pool B ==
=== Bulgaria ===
- Head Coach: Dragan Nešić

#	Name	Date of Birth	Weight	Height	Spike	Block
1	Diana Nenova
2	Denitsa Karaulanova
6	Tsvetelina Zarkova
7	Martina Georgieva
8	Eva Yaneva	31.07.1985	75	186	298	290
9	Lyubka Debarlieva
10	Radosveta Teneva
13	Mariya Filipova
14	Elena Koleva
15	Elitsa Vasileva
16	Petya Tsekova
17	Strashimira Filipova

=== Czech Republic ===
- Head Coach: Tana Krempaska

#	Name	Date of Birth	Weight	Height	Spike	Block
2	Helena Horka	15.06.1981	76	188	313	303
4	Milada Spalová	16.11.1979	78	189	312	301
5	Jana Šimánková	06.04.1980	66	178	290	279
7	Kateřina Božková	19.06.1976	80	191	306	292
8	Tereza Matuszková	03.12.1982	82	191	314	298
10	Jana Jamborová	21.05.1981	72	183	298	287
11	Michaela Jelínková	02.12.1985	80	186	307	298
13	Markéta Tomanová	10.02.1982	64	177	295	279
14	Aneta Havlíčková	03.07.1987	88	190	315	302
15	Jana Šenková	11.07.1982	73	182	300	286
16	Helena Havelková	25.07.1988	64	187	308	295
17	Ivana Plchotová	28.10.1982	74	192	316	304

=== Poland ===
- Head Coach: Marco Bonitta

#	Name	Date of Birth	Weight	Height	Spike	Block
1	Katarzyna Skowrońska	30.06.1983	73	187	305	288
2	Mariola Zenik	03.07.1982	65	175	300	290
3	Eleonora Dziękiewicz	15.10.1978	70	185	307	295
4	Izabela Bełcik	29.11.1980	65	185	304	292
6	Anna Podolec	30.10.1985	71	193	318	305
7	Małgorzata Glinka	30.09.1978	84	191	314	303
8	Dorota Świeniewicz	27.07.1972	64	180	315	305
9	Agnieszka Bednarek	20.02.1986	66	185	309	292
10	Joanna Mirek	17.02.1977		186
12	Milena Sadurek	18.10.1984	61	179	302	295
13	Milena Rosner	04.01.1980	65	180	307	292
14	Maria Liktoras	20.02.1975	73	191	312	302

=== Spain ===
- Head Coach: Aurenlio Urena

#	Name	Date of Birth	Weight	Height	Spike	Block
1	Elena García	12.08.1979	85	187	315	300
2	Daniela Marín
3	Maria Isabel Fernández
5	Sara Perez	29.11.1980	67	172	278	275
6	Daniela Patiño
7	Amaranta Fernández	11.08.1983	74	187	301	294
9	Patricia Aranda	27.06.1979	68	181	295	280
10	Diana Castaño
15	Lorena Weber
16	Sara González	16.11.1984	78	180	316	314
17	Rebeca Pazo
18	Esther Rodríguez	29.11.1974	62	172	270	265

== Pool C ==
=== Croatia ===
- Head Coach: Mijo Vuković

#	Name	Date of Birth	Weight	Height	Spike	Block
1	Zrinka Petrović
2	Ana Grbac
4	Marina Miletić
5	Mirela Delić
6	Sanja Popović
7	Diana Reščić
8	Paola Došen
9	Ilijana Dugandžić
10	Ivana Miloš
11	Katarina Barun
12	Jelena Alajbeg
15	Lucija Cigić

=== France ===
- Head Coach: Yan Fang

#	Name	Date of Birth	Weight	Height	Spike	Block
1	Karine Salinas	05.03.1973	67	178	290	280
3	Jelena Lozančić	26.03.1983		187
4	Christina Bauer	01.01.1988		196
7	Anna Rybaczewski	23.03.1982		185
8	Sandra Kociniewski	22.05.1975	68	181	302	290
10	Estelle Quérard	19.03.1979		179
11	Armelle Faesch	26.12.1981		183
12	Victoria Ravva	31.10.1975		189
13	Alexia Djilali	21.10.1987		182
15	Leslie Turiaf	15.05.1986		183
16	Hélène Schleck	13.05.1986		180
18	Alexandra Rochelle	14.12.1983		168

=== Russia ===
- Head Coach: Giovanni Caprara

#	Name	Date of Birth	Weight	Height	Spike	Block
1	Yulia Sedova	08.01.1985	75	192	308	300
3	Natalya Alimova	09.12.1978	78	192	315	308
4	Olga Fateeva	04.05.1984	72	188	310	303
5	Lioubov Sokolova	04.12.1977	72	193	315	307
6	Yelena Godina	17.09.1977	72	196	317	310
7	Natalia Safronova	06.02.1979	68	192	312	305
11	Yekaterina Gamova	17.10.1980	80	202	321	310
13	Svetlana Akulova	10.04.1984	68	180	297	287
14	Yekaterina Kabeshova	05.08.1986	66	172	279	270
15	Tatiana Kosheleva	23.12.1988	67	191	315	305
16	Yulia Merkulova	17.02.1984	75	202	317	308
18	Marina Akulova	13.12.1985	70	184	303	290

=== Turkey ===
- Head Coach: Alessandro Chiappini

#	Name	Date of Birth	Weight	Height	Spike	Block
1	Bahar Mert	13.12.1975	61	180	290	286
2	Gülden Kayalar	05.12.1980	52	167	281	275
5	Aysun Özbek	18.03.1977	73	183	305	300
6	Gökçen Denkel	02.08.1985	80	193	304	296
9	Deniz Hakyemez	03.02.1983	72	187	300	295
10	Gözde Kırdar	26.06.1985	68	183	297	292
11	Pelin Çelik	23.05.1982	57	172	278	268
12	Esra Gümüş	02.10.1982	76	181	305	297
13	Neriman Özsoy	13.07.1988	73	188	310	291
14	Eda Erdem	22.06.1987	75	187	308	302
15	Çiğdem Can Rasna	05.07.1976	71	184	306	300
17	Neslihan Darnel	09.12.1983	72	187	315	306

== Pool D ==
=== Belgium ===
- Head Coach: Jan Debrandt

#	Name	Date of Birth	Weight	Height	Spike	Block
3	Frauke Dirickx
5	Angie Bland
6	Charlotte Leys
8	Lore Gillis
10	Griet Van Vaerenbergh
11	Martha Szcygielska
12	Gwendoline Horemans
13	Celine Laforge
14	Greet Coppe
16	Els Vandesteene
17	Jolien Wittock
18	Anja Van Damme

=== Netherlands ===
- Head Coach: Avital Selinger

#	Name	Date of birth	Weight	Height	Spike	Block
1	Kim Staelens	07.01.1982	72	182	305	301
3	Francien Huurman	18.04.1975	76	192	320	292
4	Chaïne Staelens	07.11.1980	77	194	316	299
5	Sanna Visser	02.05.1984	76	185	308	285
6	Mirjam Orsel	01.04.1978	74	192	306	292
8	Alice Blom	07.04.1980	64	178	305	270
10	Janneke van Tienen	29.05.1979	73	176	293	273
11	Caroline Wensink	04.08.1984	76	186	309	281
12	Manon Flier	08.02.1984	65	191	311	301
14	Riëtte Fledderus	18.10.1977	75	171	288	268
15	Ingrid Visser	04.06.1977	75	191	312	292
16	Debby Stam	24.07.1984	70	184	303	281

=== Serbia ===
- Head Coach: Zoran Terzić

#	Name	Date of Birth	Weight	Height	Spike	Block
1	Jelena Nikolić	13.04.1982	75	194	315	300
2	Jasna Majstorović	23.04.1984	62	180	300	293
5	Nataša Krsmanović	19.06.1985	70	186	294	273
6	Jovana Brakočević	05.03.1988	77	196	309	295
7	Brižitka Molnar	28.07.1985	66	182	304	290
9	Jovana Vesović	21.06.1987	68	182	283	268
10	Maja Ognjenović	06.08.1984	68	183	290	270
11	Vesna Čitaković	03.02.1979	75	187	305	300
12	Ivana Isailović	01.01.1986	66	185	305	290
13	Maja Simanić	08.02.1980	70	180	280	270
15	Anja Spasojević	04.07.1983	75	187	308	300
18	Suzana Ćebić	09.11.1984	60	167	279	255

=== Slovakia ===
- Head Coach: Miroslav Čada

#	Name	Date of Birth	Weight	Height	Spike	Block
1	Daniela Gönciová	16.04.1984	69	179	301	279
2	Lucia Hatinová	28.02.1984	69	187	303	292
3	Jana Gogolová	27.01.1984	71	186	312	298
4	Veronika Hrončeková	02.01.1990	70	190	305	294
5	Veronika Krajčová	18.07.1988	80	189	308	293
8	Paula Kubová	28.05.1986	78	183	292	281
11	Petronela Biksadská	04.10.1982	63	185	304	292
12	Simona Kleskeňová	08.04.1980	57	168	289	279
13	Ivana Bramborová	11.04.1985	65	180	290	280
14	Alica Székelyová	05.01.1981	70	184	307	292
15	Martina Viestová	21.05.1984	68	184	296	284
16	Martina Noseková	01.04.1985	68	181	303	292
