= 2017 FIVB Volleyball World Grand Prix =

Volleyball competition held in China

2017 World Grand Prix
Tournament details
- Host country: China
- City: Nanjing (Group 1 Final)
- Dates: 7 July – 6 August
- Teams: 32 (from 5 confederations)
- Venues: 25 (in 25 host cities)

Final positions
- Champions: Brazil (12th title)
- Runners-up: Italy
- Third place: Serbia
- Fourth place: China

Tournament awards
- MVP: (Brazil) Natália Pereira
- Best Setter: (China) Ding Xia
- Best OH: (China) Zhu Ting (Brazil) Natália Pereira
- Best MB: (Brazil) Ana Beatriz Corrêa (Serbia) Milena Rašić
- Best OPP: (Serbia) Tijana Bošković
- Best Libero: (Italy) Monica De Gennaro

Tournament statistics
- Matches played: 148

The 2017 FIVB Volleyball World Grand Prix was the 25th edition of the annual women's international volleyball tournament played by 32 teams between 7 July and 6 August. The Group 1 Final Round was held in Nanjing, China.

Defending champions Brazil won their record twelfth title in the tournament after a 3–2 win over Italy. Serbia captured their third bronze medal in the competition by defeating China in a rematch of the previous year's Olympic final. Natália Pereira from Brazil was elected the MVP for the second straight year.

In the Group 2 finals held in Ostrava, Czech Republic, Poland defeated South Korea in straight sets.

Moreover, Hungary finished atop of Group 3 at their first-ever World Grand Prix participation after a 3–0 win over the home team in the final match in Canberra, Australia.

== Qualification ==
- Excluding Cuba, who withdrew from the tournament, the remaining 27 teams from the 2016 edition directly qualified.
- Cameroon, France, Hungary, South Korea, Trinidad and Tobago, and Venezuela were invited to participate in this edition.
- Azerbaijan were initially listed in Group 3, but withdrew and were replaced by Venezuela.
- Kenya were initially listed in Group 2, but withdrew and were replaced by Colombia. France replaced Colombia in Group 3.

Africa	Asia and Oceania	Europe	North America	South America
Algeria; Cameroon^{1}	Australia; China; Japan; Kazakhstan; South Korea; Thailand	Belgium; Bulgaria; Croatia; Czech Republic; France^{1} Germany; Hungary^{1} Italy; Netherlands; Poland; Russia; Serbia; Turkey	Canada; Dominican Republic; Mexico; Puerto Rico; Trinidad and Tobago^{1} United States	Argentina; Brazil; Colombia; Peru; Venezuela^{1}

^{1} Teams making their debuts.

== Format ==
=== Intercontinental round ===
- Group 1, the 12 teams were drawn into 3 pools of 4 teams for each of the three weeks of competition, resulting in a total of 9 pools of 4 teams. In each pool, all teams will compete in round robin format. The results of all 9 pools will combine in 1 ranking table. The hosts and the top five ranked teams will play in the final round. The last ranked team after the Intercontinental Round could be relegated if the winners of the Group 2 Final Round can meet the promotion requirements set by the FIVB.
- Group 2, the 12 teams were drawn in 9 pools of 4 teams. In each pool, all teams will compete in round robin format. The results of all 9 pools will combine in 1 ranking table. The hosts and the top three ranked teams will play in the final round. The last ranked team after the Intercontinental Round could be relegated if the winners of the Group 3 Final Round can meet the promotion requirements set by the FIVB.
- Group 3, the 8 teams were drawn in 4 pools of 4 teams. In each pool, all teams will compete in round robin format. The results of all 4 pools will combine in 1 ranking table. The hosts and the top three ranked teams will play in the final round.

=== Final round ===
- Group 1, the 6 teams in the final round will be divided in 2 pools determined by the serpentine system. The host team will be at the top position and the other teams will be allocated by their rankings in the preliminary round. The top 2 teams from each pool will play in the semifinals. The winning teams will play in the final match for the gold medals.
- Group 2 and Group 3, the host team will face the last ranked team among the qualified teams in the semifinals. The other 2 teams will play against each other in the other semifinal. The winning teams will play in the final match for the gold medals and a chance for promotion.

== Pool composition ==
The pools were announced on 14 September 2016.

=== Group 1 ===
Week 1
Pool A1 Turkey	Pool B1 China	Pool C1 Netherlands
Brazil; Belgium; Turkey; Serbia	United States; Russia; Italy; China	Netherlands; Dominican Republic; Japan; Thailand
Week 2
Pool D1 Japan	Pool E1 Macau	Pool F1 Russia
Brazil; Thailand; Japan; Serbia	United States; Turkey; Italy; China	Netherlands; Dominican Republic; Russia; Belgium
Week 3
Pool G1 Hong Kong	Pool H1 Thailand	Pool I1 Brazil
Japan; Russia; China; Serbia	Italy; Dominican Republic; Turkey; Thailand	Netherlands; Belgium; United States; Brazil

=== Group 2 ===
Week 1
Pool A2 Bulgaria	Pool B2 Argentina	Pool C2 Peru
Germany; Bulgaria; South Korea; Kazakhstan	Poland; Canada; Argentina; Croatia	Puerto Rico; Czech Republic; Peru; Colombia
Week 2
Pool D2 Kazakhstan	Pool E2 Poland	Pool F2 Puerto Rico
Germany; Colombia; Croatia; Kazakhstan	Poland; South Korea; Argentina; Peru	Puerto Rico; Czech Republic; Canada; Bulgaria
Week 3
Pool G2 Canada	Pool H2 South Korea	Pool I2 Croatia
Germany; Canada; Peru; Czech Republic	Poland; Colombia; South Korea; Kazakhstan	Puerto Rico; Bulgaria; Argentina; Croatia

=== Group 3 ===
Week 1
Pool A3 Mexico	Pool B3 Cameroon
Australia; Trinidad and Tobago; Mexico; Hungary	France; Algeria; Cameroon; Venezuela
Week 2
Pool C3 Venezuela	Pool D3 Trinidad and Tobago
Hungary; Algeria; Mexico; Venezuela	France; Trinidad and Tobago; Cameroon; Australia

=== Final round ===
Week 5
Group 1 China
Pool J1; China; Brazil; Netherlands Pool K1; Serbia; United States; Italy
Week 4	Week 3
Group 2 Czech Republic	Group 3 Australia
Czech Republic; South Korea; Germany; Poland	Australia; Hungary; France; Venezuela

== Competition schedule ==
●	Intercontinental round	●	Final round

	Week 1 7–9 Jul	Week 2 14–16 Jul	Week 3 21–23 Jul	Week 4 28–30 Jul	Week 5 2–6 Aug
Group 1	18 matches	18 matches	18 matches		10 matches
Group 2	18 matches	18 matches	18 matches	4 matches	
Group 3	12 matches	12 matches	4 matches		

== Pool standing procedure ==
1. Number of matches won
2. Match points
3. Sets ratio
4. Points ratio
5. If the tie continues as per the point ratio between two teams, priority will be given to the team which won the last match between them. When the tie in points ratio is between three or more teams, a new classification of these teams in terms of points 1, 2, and 3 will be made, taking into consideration only the matches in which they were opposed to each other.

Match won 3–0 or 3–1: 3 match points for the winner, 0 match points for the loser
Match won 3–2: 2 match points for the winner, 1 match point for the loser

== Intercontinental round ==
=== Group 1 ===
==== Ranking ====
Pos	Team	Pld	W	L	Pts	SW	SL	SR	SPW	SPL	SPR	Qualification
1	Serbia	9	7	2	22	23	8	2.875	735	621	1.184	Group 1 final round
2	United States	9	6	3	19	23	14	1.643	843	778	1.084	Group 1 final round
3	Brazil	9	6	3	18	20	13	1.538	765	702	1.090	Group 1 final round
4	Netherlands	9	6	3	17	22	13	1.692	781	736	1.061	Group 1 final round
5	Italy	9	6	3	16	19	14	1.357	748	720	1.039	Group 1 final round
6	Japan	9	6	3	13	20	20	1.000	868	876	0.991	
7	China (Note: Qualified as hosts) (H)	9	5	4	13	17	19	0.895	818	838	0.976	Group 1 final round
8	Dominican Republic	9	4	5	11	15	21	0.714	782	808	0.968	
9	Russia	9	3	6	13	17	20	0.850	801	830	0.965	
10	Thailand	9	3	6	11	16	18	0.889	726	751	0.967	
11	Turkey	9	2	7	7	11	22	0.500	696	780	0.892	
12	Belgium	9	0	9	2	6	27	0.222	659	782	0.843	Relegated position

(H) Host

==== Week 1 ====
===== Pool A1 =====
- Venue: Başkent Volleyball Hall, Ankara, Turkey
- All times are Turkey Time (UTC+03:00).

Date	Time		Score		Set 1	Set 2	Set 3	Set 4	Set 5	Total	Report
7 Jul	16:30	Turkey	0–3	Serbia	19–25	17–25	15–25			51–75	P2 P3
7 Jul	19:30	Belgium	0–3	Brazil	22–25	23–25	18–25			63–75	P2 P3
8 Jul	16:30	Brazil	0–3	Serbia	19–25	20–25	19–25			58–75	P2 P3
8 Jul	19:30	Turkey	3–1	Belgium	23–25	25–20	25–20	25–16		98–81	P2 P3
9 Jul	16:30	Serbia	3–0	Belgium	25–18	25–18	25–18			75–54	P2 P3
9 Jul	19:30	Turkey	2–3	Brazil	26–24	17–25	18–25	25–22	13–15	99–111	P2 P3

===== Pool B1 =====
- Venue: Kunshan Stadium, Kunshan, China
- All times are China Standard Time (UTC+08:00).

Date	Time		Score		Set 1	Set 2	Set 3	Set 4	Set 5	Total	Report
7 Jul	15:00	United States	3–2	Russia	22–25	25–19	25–27	25–16	15–11	112–98	P2 P3
7 Jul	19:00	China	3–1	Italy	25–20	20–25	25–23	25–20		95–88	P2 P3
8 Jul	15:00	Italy	0–3	United States	21–25	22–25	19–25			62–75	P2 P3
8 Jul	19:00	China	3–2	Russia	24–26	25–21	16–25	27–25	16–14	108–111	P2 P3
9 Jul	15:00	Russia	2–3	Italy	21–25	29–27	26–24	24–26	10–15	110–117	P2 P3
9 Jul	19:00	China	0–3	United States	22–25	22–25	21–25			65–75	P2 P3

===== Pool C1 =====
- Venue: Omnisport Apeldoorn, Apeldoorn, Netherlands
- All times are Central European Summer Time (UTC+02:00).

Date	Time		Score		Set 1	Set 2	Set 3	Set 4	Set 5	Total	Report
7 Jul	17:30	Netherlands	3–0	Dominican Republic	25–21	25–19	25–21			75–61	P2 P3
7 Jul	20:30	Japan	3–2	Thailand	25–19	18–25	25–14	22–25	15–9	105–92	P2 P3
8 Jul	17:30	Netherlands	3–0	Thailand	25–20	26–24	25–16			76–60	P2 P3
8 Jul	20:30	Dominican Republic	3–1	Japan	25–20	25–19	24–26	29–27		103–92	P2 P3
9 Jul	17:30	Netherlands	2–3	Japan	25–17	25–21	18–25	22–25	9–15	99–103	P2 P3
9 Jul	20:30	Thailand	1–3	Dominican Republic	22–25	25–22	22–25	18–25		87–97	P2 P3

==== Week 2 ====
===== Pool D1 =====
- Venue: Kamei Arena Sendai, Sendai, Japan
- All times are Japan Standard Time (UTC+09:00).

Date	Time		Score		Set 1	Set 2	Set 3	Set 4	Set 5	Total	Report
14 Jul	15:40	Brazil	3–0	Serbia	26–24	25–17	25–22			76–63	P2 P3
14 Jul	19:10	Japan	3–1	Thailand	25–19	17–25	25–18	25–19		92–81	P2 P3
15 Jul	14:10	Japan	0–3	Serbia	21–25	20–25	20–25			61–75	P2 P3
15 Jul	17:10	Brazil	0–3	Thailand	22–25	21–25	27–29			70–79	P2 P3
16 Jul	13:15	Japan	3–2	Brazil	25–22	26–24	19–25	20–25	17–15	107–111	P2 P3
16 Jul	16:10	Serbia	3–1	Thailand	25–17	23–25	25–16	25–19		98–77	P2 P3

===== Pool E1 =====
- Venue: Macau Forum, Macau, China
- All times are China Standard Time (UTC+08:00).

Date	Time		Score		Set 1	Set 2	Set 3	Set 4	Set 5	Total	Report
14 Jul	16:00	United States	3–1	Turkey	25–21	24–26	25–19	25–12		99–78	P2 P3
14 Jul	20:00	China	0–3	Italy	19–25	22–25	21–25			62–75	P2 P3
15 Jul	14:30	United States	2–3	Italy	22–25	25–22	21–25	25–13	13–15	106–100	P2 P3
15 Jul	17:00	China	3–1	Turkey	25–23	19–25	25–23	25–23		94–94	P2 P3
16 Jul	13:00	Italy	3–0	Turkey	25–13	25–20	25–14			75–47	P2 P3
16 Jul	15:30	China	3–2	United States	25–27	25–23	25–21	23–25	15–11	113–107	P2 P3

===== Pool F1 =====
- Venue: DS Yantarny, Kaliningrad, Russia
- All times are Kaliningrad Time (UTC+02:00).

Date	Time		Score		Set 1	Set 2	Set 3	Set 4	Set 5	Total	Report
14 Jul	16:40	Netherlands	3–0	Belgium	25–22	25–19	25–21			75–62	P2 P3
14 Jul	19:10	Russia	3–1	Dominican Republic	16–25	25–23	25–21	25–14		91–83	P2 P3
15 Jul	16:40	Netherlands	3–2	Dominican Republic	23–25	22–25	25–22	25–23	15–8	110–103	P2 P3
15 Jul	19:10	Russia	3–0	Belgium	26–24	25–14	25–22			76–60	P2 P3
16 Jul	16:40	Dominican Republic	3–2	Belgium	25–13	21–25	25–21	18–25	15–11	104–95	P2 P3
16 Jul	19:10	Russia	0–3	Netherlands	18–25	22–25	16–25			56–75	P2 P3

==== Week 3 ====
===== Pool G1 =====
- Venue: Hong Kong Coliseum, Hong Kong, China
- All times are Hong Kong Time (UTC+08:00).

Date	Time		Score		Set 1	Set 2	Set 3	Set 4	Set 5	Total	Report
21 Jul	18:30	Serbia	3–0	Russia	26–24	25–14	25–19			76–57	P2 P3
21 Jul	21:00	China	3–1	Japan	25–19	25–20	33–35	25–21		108–95	P2 P3
22 Jul	13:15	Japan	3–2	Serbia	21–25	20–25	25–23	25–20	15–12	106–105	P2 P3
22 Jul	15:45	China	1–3	Russia	23–25	25–22	18–25	26–28		92–100	P2 P3
23 Jul	13:15	Japan	3–2	Russia	23–25	19–25	25–20	25–22	15–10	107–102	P2 P3
23 Jul	15:45	China	1–3	Serbia	21–25	20–25	25–18	15–25		81–93	P2 P3

===== Pool H1 =====
- Venue: Indoor Stadium Huamark, Bangkok, Thailand
- All times are Indochina Time (UTC+07:00).

Date	Time		Score		Set 1	Set 2	Set 3	Set 4	Set 5	Total	Report
21 Jul	15:00	Italy	3–1	Turkey	25–17	20–25	25–21	32–30		102–93	P2 P3
21 Jul	18:00	Thailand	2–3	Dominican Republic	25–17	21–25	26–24	21–25	7–15	100–106	P2 P3
22 Jul	15:00	Italy	3–0	Dominican Republic	25–20	25–22	25–15			75–57	P2 P3
22 Jul	18:00	Thailand	3–0	Turkey	25–20	25–22	25–11			75–53	P2 P3
23 Jul	15:00	Dominican Republic	0–3	Turkey	14–25	31–33	23–25			68–83	P2 P3
23 Jul	18:00	Thailand	3–0	Italy	25–13	25–21	25–20			75–54	P2 P3

===== Pool I1 =====
- Venue: Ginásio Aecim Tocantins, Cuiabá, Brazil
- All times are Amazonas Time (UTC−04:00).

Date	Time		Score		Set 1	Set 2	Set 3	Set 4	Set 5	Total	Report
20 Jul	14:05	Brazil	3–0	Belgium	28–26	25–19	25–20			78–65	P2 P3
20 Jul	16:10	United States	3–1	Netherlands	25–15	23–25	28–26	25–21		101–87	P2 P3
21 Jul	14:05	Brazil	3–1	Netherlands	25–17	25–14	18–25	25–19		93–75	P2 P3
21 Jul	16:10	United States	3–1	Belgium	25–14	16–25	25–19	26–24		92–82	P2 P3
23 Jul	09:10	Brazil	3–1	United States	25–20	25–13	18–25	25–18		93–76	P2 P3
23 Jul	11:15	Belgium	2–3	Netherlands	27–29	25–18	12–25	25–22	8–15	97–109	P2 P3

=== Group 2 ===
==== Ranking ====
Pos	Team	Pld	W	L	Pts	SW	SL	SR	SPW	SPL	SPR	Qualification
1	South Korea	9	8	1	25	26	5	5.200	736	622	1.183	Group 2 final round
2	Germany	9	8	1	23	25	6	4.167	737	602	1.224	Group 2 final round
3	Poland	9	7	2	21	22	7	3.143	709	553	1.282	Group 2 final round
4	Czech Republic (Note: Qualified as hosts) (H)	9	7	2	19	21	14	1.500	775	764	1.014	Group 2 final round
5	Bulgaria	9	5	4	16	22	17	1.294	852	820	1.039	
6	Puerto Rico	9	5	4	12	17	19	0.895	782	796	0.982	
7	Colombia	9	4	5	12	12	17	0.706	634	664	0.955	
8	Canada	9	3	6	11	15	20	0.750	774	745	1.039	
9	Peru	9	3	6	9	13	20	0.650	737	768	0.960	
10	Argentina	9	2	7	8	11	22	0.500	688	735	0.936	
11	Croatia	9	1	8	3	9	26	0.346	646	844	0.765	
12	Kazakhstan	9	1	8	3	5	25	0.200	567	724	0.783	Relegated position

(H) Host

==== Week 1 ====
===== Pool A2 =====
- Venue: Bulstrad Arena, Ruse, Bulgaria
- All times are Eastern European Summer Time (UTC+03:00).

Date	Time		Score		Set 1	Set 2	Set 3	Set 4	Set 5	Total	Report
7 Jul	16:40	South Korea	3–1	Germany	19–25	25–23	25–18	25–23		94–89	P2 P3
7 Jul	20:10	Bulgaria	3–0	Kazakhstan	25–22	25–19	25–14			75–55	P2 P3
8 Jul	16:40	Germany	3–0	Kazakhstan	25–13	25–21	25–17			75–51	P2 P3
8 Jul	20:10	Bulgaria	3–2	South Korea	20–25	25–15	25–14	22–25	15–8	107–87	P2 P3
9 Jul	16:40	Kazakhstan	0–3	South Korea	12–25	19–25	14–25			45–75	P2 P3
9 Jul	20:10	Bulgaria	2–3	Germany	22–25	25–20	20–25	25–17	13–15	105–102	P2 P3

===== Pool B2 =====
- Venue: Estadio Ruca Che, Neuquén, Argentina
- All times are Argentina Time (UTC−03:00).

Date	Time		Score		Set 1	Set 2	Set 3	Set 4	Set 5	Total	Report
7 Jul	18:00	Croatia	0–3	Poland	10–25	9–25	18–25			37–75	P2 P3
7 Jul	21:00	Argentina	0–3	Canada	18–25	14–25	20–25			52–75	P2 P3
8 Jul	16:00	Poland	3–0	Canada	25–22	25–9	25–23			75–54	P2 P3
8 Jul	19:00	Argentina	2–3	Croatia	25–20	28–30	25–15	22–25	14–16	114–106	P2 P3
9 Jul	16:00	Canada	3–1	Croatia	23–25	25–11	25–10	25–18		98–64	P2 P3
9 Jul	19:00	Argentina	0–3	Poland	21–25	19–25	14–25			54–75	P2 P3

===== Pool C2 =====
- Venue: Coliseo Cerrado de Chiclayo, Chiclayo, Peru
- All times are Peru Time (UTC−05:00).

Date	Time		Score		Set 1	Set 2	Set 3	Set 4	Set 5	Total	Report
7 Jul	16:35	Czech Republic	3–0	Colombia	25–23	25–21	25–20			75–64	P2 P3
7 Jul	19:05	Peru	3–1	Puerto Rico	17–25	25–15	25–19	25–21		92–80	P2 P3
8 Jul	15:35	Puerto Rico	1–3	Czech Republic	20–25	28–26	21–25	18–25		87–101	P2 P3
8 Jul	18:05	Peru	3–0	Colombia	25–15	25–21	26–24			76–60	P2 P3
9 Jul	16:35	Puerto Rico	0–3	Colombia	16–25	12–25	24–26			52–76	P2 P3
9 Jul	19:05	Peru	1–3	Czech Republic	24–26	25–21	22–25	23–25		94–97	P2 P3

==== Week 2 ====
===== Pool D2 =====
- Venue: Baluan Sholak Sports Palace, Almaty, Kazakhstan
- All times are Almaty Time (UTC+06:00).

Date	Time		Score		Set 1	Set 2	Set 3	Set 4	Set 5	Total	Report
14 Jul	14:10	Colombia	3–1	Croatia	25–22	25–27	25–19	25–20		100–88	P2 P3
14 Jul	17:10	Kazakhstan	1–3	Germany	25–20	18–25	17–25	21–25		81–95	P2 P3
15 Jul	14:10	Croatia	0–3	Germany	24–26	15–25	6–25			45–76	P2 P3
15 Jul	17:10	Kazakhstan	1–3	Colombia	21–25	25–20	25–27	16–25		87–97	P2 P3
16 Jul	14:10	Germany	3–0	Colombia	25–16	25–16	25–23			75–55	P2 P3
16 Jul	17:10	Kazakhstan	3–1	Croatia	25–22	22–25	25–20	25–15		97–82	P2 P3

===== Pool E2 =====
- Venue: Hala sportowo-widowiskowa KSZO, Ostrowiec Świętokrzyski, Poland
- All times are Central European Summer Time (UTC+02:00).

Date	Time		Score		Set 1	Set 2	Set 3	Set 4	Set 5	Total	Report
14 Jul	17:25	Argentina	0–3	South Korea	25–27	22–25	8–25			55–77	P2 P3
14 Jul	20:25	Poland	3–1	Peru	22–25	25–17	27–25	27–25		101–92	P2 P3
15 Jul	17:25	South Korea	3–0	Peru	26–24	27–25	25–15			78–64	P2 P3
15 Jul	20:25	Poland	3–0	Argentina	25–10	26–24	25–15			76–49	P2 P3
16 Jul	17:25	Peru	3–1	Argentina	25–18	18–25	25–23	25–19		93–85	P2 P3
16 Jul	20:25	Poland	1–3	South Korea	26–24	23–25	19–25	24–26		92–100	P2 P3

===== Pool F2 =====
- Venue: Roberto Clemente Coliseum, San Juan, Puerto Rico
- All times are Atlantic Standard Time (UTC−04:00).

Date	Time		Score		Set 1	Set 2	Set 3	Set 4	Set 5	Total	Report
14 Jul	17:10	Czech Republic	3–2	Bulgaria	25–27	25–20	12–25	25–14	15–9	102–95	P2 P3
14 Jul	20:10	Puerto Rico	3–2	Canada	25–20	25–21	22–25	20–25	15–13	107–104	P2 P3
15 Jul	17:10	Bulgaria	3–1	Canada	15–25	30–28	31–29	25–21		101–103	P2 P3
15 Jul	20:10	Puerto Rico	3–0	Czech Republic	25–20	25–21	25–17			75–58	P2 P3
16 Jul	15:10	Czech Republic	3–2	Canada	25–22	18–25	16–25	25–23	15–11	99–106	P2 P3
16 Jul	18:10	Puerto Rico	3–2	Bulgaria	26–24	22–25	25–18	33–35	15–7	121–109	P2 P3

==== Week 3 ====
===== Pool G2 =====
- Venue: Richmond Olympic Oval, Richmond, Canada
- All times are Pacific Standard Time (UTC−07:00).

Date	Time		Score		Set 1	Set 2	Set 3	Set 4	Set 5	Total	Report
21 Jul	18:10	Canada	0–3	Germany	17–25	18–25	20–25			55–75	P2 P3
21 Jul	20:10	Peru	1–3	Czech Republic	23–25	22–25	25–19	17–25		87–94	P2 P3
22 Jul	12:40	Canada	3–1	Peru	20–25	25–17	25–17	25–21		95–80	P2 P3
22 Jul	14:40	Czech Republic	0–3	Germany	18–25	21–25	15–25			54–75	P2 P3
23 Jul	12:40	Canada	1–3	Czech Republic	21–25	22–25	25–17	16–25		84–92	P2 P3
23 Jul	14:40	Germany	3–0	Peru	25–18	25–21	25–23			75–62	P2 P3

===== Pool H2 =====
- Venue: Suwon Gymnasium, Suwon, South Korea
- All times are Korea Standard Time (UTC+09:00).

Date	Time		Score		Set 1	Set 2	Set 3	Set 4	Set 5	Total	Report
21 Jul	16:00	South Korea	3–0	Kazakhstan	25–12	25–14	25–17			75–43	P2 P3
21 Jul	19:00	Colombia	0–3	Poland	15–25	14–25	16–25			45–75	P2 P3
22 Jul	14:00	South Korea	3–0	Colombia	25–23	25–20	25–19			75–62	P2 P3
22 Jul	16:30	Poland	3–0	Kazakhstan	25–12	25–21	25–14			75–47	P2 P3
23 Jul	14:00	South Korea	3–0	Poland	25–23	25–20	25–22			75–65	P2 P3
23 Jul	16:30	Kazakhstan	0–3	Colombia	22–25	19–25	20–25			61–75	P2 P3

===== Pool I2 =====
- Venue: Varaždin Arena, Varaždin, Croatia
- All times are Central European Summer Time (UTC+02:00).

Date	Time		Score		Set 1	Set 2	Set 3	Set 4	Set 5	Total	Report
21 Jul	16:00	Bulgaria	1–3	Puerto Rico	25–17	16–25	18–25	26–28		85–95	P2 P3
21 Jul	19:00	Croatia	1–3	Argentina	28–26	19–25	16–25	13–25		76–101	P2 P3
22 Jul	16:00	Puerto Rico	0–3	Argentina	21–25	15–25	21–25			57–75	P2 P3
22 Jul	19:00	Croatia	0–3	Bulgaria	18–25	17–25	17–25			52–75	P2 P3
23 Jul	16:00	Bulgaria	3–2	Argentina	25–22	17–25	18–25	25–19	15–12	100–103	P2 P3
23 Jul	19:00	Croatia	2–3	Puerto Rico	19–25	20–25	26–24	25–19	6–15	96–108	P2 P3

=== Group 3 ===
==== Ranking ====
Pos	Team	Pld	W	L	Pts	SW	SL	SR	SPW	SPL	SPR	Qualification
1	Hungary	6	6	0	18	18	1	18.000	475	341	1.393	Group 3 final round
2	France	6	6	0	16	18	5	3.600	539	448	1.203	Group 3 final round
3	Venezuela	6	4	2	13	14	6	2.333	457	416	1.099	Group 3 final round
4	Mexico	6	3	3	9	9	11	0.818	444	442	1.005	
5	Cameroon	6	3	3	8	10	12	0.833	471	480	0.981	
6	Australia (Note: Qualified as hosts) (H)	6	1	5	4	9	15	0.600	514	544	0.945	Group 3 final round
7	Trinidad and Tobago	6	1	5	4	6	16	0.375	432	506	0.854	
8	Algeria	6	0	6	0	0	18	0.000	298	453	0.658	

(H) Host

==== Week 1 ====
===== Pool A3 =====
- Venue: Gimnasio Olímpico, Aguascalientes City, Mexico
- All times are Central Daylight Time (UTC−05:00).

Date	Time		Score		Set 1	Set 2	Set 3	Set 4	Set 5	Total	Report
7 Jul	18:00	Hungary	3–0	Trinidad and Tobago	25–21	25–20	25–16			75–57	P2 P3
7 Jul	20:00	Mexico	3–1	Australia	22–25	25–22	25–18	25–23		97–88	P2 P3
8 Jul	18:00	Australia	1–3	Hungary	17–25	21–25	27–25	19–25		84–100	P2 P3
8 Jul	20:00	Mexico	3–1	Trinidad and Tobago	22–25	25–17	25–19	25–10		97–71	P2 P3
9 Jul	18:00	Australia	3–0	Trinidad and Tobago	25–20	25–12	25–23			75–55	P2 P3
9 Jul	20:00	Mexico	0–3	Hungary	21–25	22–25	18–25			61–75	P2 P3

===== Pool B3 =====
- Venue: Yaoundé Multipurpose Sports Complex, Yaoundé, Cameroon
- All times are West Africa Time (UTC+01:00).

Date	Time		Score		Set 1	Set 2	Set 3	Set 4	Set 5	Total	Report
7 Jul	16:00	France	3–2	Venezuela	24–26	25–12	19–25	25–21	15–10	108–94	P2 P3
7 Jul	18:00	Cameroon	3–0	Algeria	25–22	25–11	25–22			75–55	P2 P3
8 Jul	16:00	France	3–0	Algeria	25–14	25–11	25–19			75–44	P2 P3
8 Jul	18:00	Cameroon	0–3	Venezuela	20–25	22–25	15–25			57–75	P2 P3
9 Jul	16:00	Algeria	0–3	Venezuela	15–25	17–25	15–25			47–75	P2 P3
9 Jul	18:00	Cameroon	1–3	France	16–25	27–25	19–25	16–25		78–100	P2 P3

==== Week 2 ====
===== Pool C3 =====
- Venue: Poliedro de Caracas, Caracas, Venezuela
- All times are Atlantic Standard Time (UTC−04:00).

Date	Time		Score		Set 1	Set 2	Set 3	Set 4	Set 5	Total	Report
14 Jul	16:00	Mexico	0–3	Hungary	14–25	20–25	13–25			47–75	P2 P3
14 Jul	19:00	Venezuela	3–0	Algeria	28–26	25–18	25–18			78–62	P2 P3
15 Jul	16:00	Algeria	0–3	Hungary	7–25	9–25	16–25			32–75	P2 P3
15 Jul	19:00	Venezuela	3–0	Mexico	25–22	25–22	25–23			75–67	P2 P3
16 Jul	16:00	Mexico	3–0	Algeria	25–19	25–20	25–19			75–58	P2 P3
16 Jul	19:00	Venezuela	0–3	Hungary	18–25	19–25	23–25			60–75	P2 P3

===== Pool D3 =====
- Venue: National Cycling Center, Port of Spain, Trinidad and Tobago
- All times are Atlantic Standard Time (UTC−04:00).

Date	Time		Score		Set 1	Set 2	Set 3	Set 4	Set 5	Total	Report
14 Jul	17:30	Cameroon	0–3	France	21–25	22–25	23–25			66–75	P2 P3
14 Jul	20:00	Trinidad and Tobago	3–1	Australia	16–25	25–17	26–24	25–17		92–83	P2 P3
15 Jul	17:30	Cameroon	3–1	Australia	19–25	25–21	25–15	25–19		94–80	P2 P3
15 Jul	20:00	Trinidad and Tobago	0–3	France	20–25	22–25	20–25			62–75	P2 P3
16 Jul	17:30	France	3–2	Australia	17–25	25–18	25–23	24–26	15–12	106–104	P2 P3
16 Jul	20:00	Trinidad and Tobago	2–3	Cameroon	18–25	25–18	17–25	25–18	10–15	95–101	P2 P3

== Final round ==
=== Group 3 ===
- Venue: AIS Arena, Canberra, Australia
- All times are Australian Eastern Standard Time (UTC+10:00).

==== Final four (Week 3) ====
Semifinals
22 July
Hungary	3
France	2
22 July
Australia	3
Venezuela	0

Final
23 July
Hungary	3
Australia	0
3rd place match
23 July
France	3
Venezuela	0

===== Semifinals =====
Date	Time		Score		Set 1	Set 2	Set 3	Set 4	Set 5	Total	Report
22 Jul	16:10	Hungary	3–2	France	24–26	25–18	21–25	25–15	15–11	110–95	P2 P3
22 Jul	19:10	Australia	3–0	Venezuela	25–0	25–0	25–0			75–0	Walkover

===== 3rd place match =====
Date	Time		Score		Set 1	Set 2	Set 3	Set 4	Set 5	Total	Report
23 Jul	13:10	France	3–0	Venezuela	25–0	25–0	25–0			75–0	Walkover

===== Final =====
Date	Time		Score		Set 1	Set 2	Set 3	Set 4	Set 5	Total	Report
23 Jul	16:10	Hungary	3–0	Australia	25–18	25–17	25–20			75–55	P2 P3

=== Group 2 ===
- Venue: Winter Stadium Ostrava-Poruba, Ostrava, Czech Republic
- All times are Central European Summer Time (UTC+02:00).

==== Final four (Week 4) ====
Semifinals
South Korea	3
Germany	2
Czech Republic	1
Poland	3

Final
South Korea	0
Poland	3
3rd place match
Germany	3
Czech Republic	1

===== Semifinals =====
Date	Time		Score		Set 1	Set 2	Set 3	Set 4	Set 5	Total	Report
29 Jul	16:10	South Korea	3–2	Germany	19–25	13–25	25–21	25–18	15–12	97–101	P2 P3
29 Jul	19:10	Czech Republic	1–3	Poland	27–25	20–25	21–25	20–25		88–100	P2 P3

===== 3rd place match =====
Date	Time		Score		Set 1	Set 2	Set 3	Set 4	Set 5	Total	Report
30 Jul	15:10	Germany	3–1	Czech Republic	25–23	17–25	25–20	25–23		92–91	P2 P3

===== Final =====
Date	Time		Score		Set 1	Set 2	Set 3	Set 4	Set 5	Total	Report
30 Jul	18:10	South Korea	0–3	Poland	19–25	21–25	21–25			61–75	P2 P3

=== Group 1 ===
- Venue: Nanjing Olympic Sports Centre, Nanjing, China
- All times are China Standard Time (UTC+08:00).

==== Pool play (Week 5) ====
===== Pool J1 =====
Pos	Team	Pld	W	L	Pts	SW	SL	SR	SPW	SPL	SPR	Qualification
1	China	2	2	0	5	6	2	3.000	190	178	1.067	Semifinals
2	Brazil	2	1	1	2	3	5	0.600	178	187	0.952	Semifinals
3	Netherlands	2	0	2	2	4	6	0.667	220	223	0.987	

Date	Time		Score		Set 1	Set 2	Set 3	Set 4	Set 5	Total	Report
2 Aug	19:30	China	3–0	Brazil	25–22	25–17	29–27			79–66	P2 P3
3 Aug	19:30	Brazil	3–2	Netherlands	25–27	25–23	22–25	25–22	15–11	112–108	P2 P3
4 Aug	19:30	China	3–2	Netherlands	25–23	23–25	25–23	20–25	18–16	111–112	P2 P3

===== Pool K1 =====
Pos	Team	Pld	W	L	Pts	SW	SL	SR	SPW	SPL	SPR	Qualification
1	Serbia	2	2	0	5	6	3	2.000	199	187	1.064	Semifinals
2	Italy	2	1	1	3	4	4	1.000	184	182	1.011	Semifinals
3	United States	2	0	2	1	3	6	0.500	189	203	0.931	

Date	Time		Score		Set 1	Set 2	Set 3	Set 4	Set 5	Total	Report
2 Aug	15:00	Serbia	3–2	United States	25–22	25–17	23–25	18–25	15–11	106–100	P2 P3
3 Aug	15:00	United States	1–3	Italy	21–25	25–22	22–25	21–25		89–97	P2 P3
4 Aug	15:00	Serbia	3–1	Italy	25–18	25–19	16–25	27–25		93–87	P2 P3

==== Final four (Week 5) ====
Semifinals
5 August
China	1
Italy	3
5 August
Serbia	1
Brazil	3

Final
6 August
Italy	2
Brazil	3
3rd place match
6 August
China	1
Serbia	3

===== Semifinals =====
Date	Time		Score		Set 1	Set 2	Set 3	Set 4	Set 5	Total	Report
5 Aug	15:00	Serbia	1–3	Brazil	25–20	23–25	14–25	23–25		85–95	P2 P3
5 Aug	20:00	China	1–3	Italy	25–18	23–25	22–25	25–27		95–95	P2 P3

===== 3rd place match =====
Date	Time		Score		Set 1	Set 2	Set 3	Set 4	Set 5	Total	Report
6 Aug	15:00	China	1–3	Serbia	22–25	25–20	23–25	21–25		91–95	P2 P3

===== Final =====
Date	Time		Score		Set 1	Set 2	Set 3	Set 4	Set 5	Total	Report
6 Aug	20:00	Italy	2–3	Brazil	24–26	25–17	22–25	25–22	8–15	104–105	P2 P3

== Final standing ==
Rank	Team
1st place, gold medalist(s)	Brazil
2nd place, silver medalist(s)	Italy
3rd place, bronze medalist(s)	Serbia
4	China
5	Netherlands
5	United States
7	Japan
8	Dominican Republic
9	Russia
10	Thailand
11	Turkey
12	Belgium
13	Poland
14	South Korea
15	Germany
16	Czech Republic
17	Bulgaria
18	Puerto Rico
19	Colombia
20	Canada
21	Peru
22	Argentina
23	Croatia
24	Kazakhstan
25	Hungary
26	Australia
27	France
28	Venezuela
29	Mexico
30	Cameroon
31	Trinidad and Tobago
32	Algeria

2017 World Grand Prix champions

Brazil
12th title

14-woman Roster for Group 1 Final Round
Mara Leão, Macris Carneiro, Ana Carolina da Silva, Adenízia da Silva, Rosamaria Montibeller, Roberta Ratzke, Tandara Caixeta, Natália Pereira (c), Amanda Francisco, Gabriella Souza, Drussyla Costa, Suelen Pinto, Ana Beatriz Corrêa, Monique Pavão
Head coach
José Roberto Guimarães

== Awards ==
- Most valuable player
  (Brazil) Natália Pereira
- Best Outside Hitters
  (China) Zhu Ting
  (Brazil) Natália Pereira
- Best setter
  (China) Ding Xia
- Best Middle Blockers
  (Brazil) Ana Beatriz Corrêa
  (Serbia) Milena Rašić
- Best libero
  (Italy) Monica De Gennaro
- Best Opposite
  (Serbia) Tijana Bošković

== Statistics leaders ==
The statistics of each group follow the vis reports P2 and P3. The statistics include 6 volleyball skills: serve, reception, set, spike, block, and dig. The table below shows the top 5 ranked players in each skill by group plus top scorers as of 24 July 2017.

=== Best scorers ===
Best scorers determined by scored points from spike, block, and serve.

	GROUP 1		GROUP 2		GROUP 3	
Rank	Name	Points	Name	Points	Name	Points
1	(Serbia) Brankica Mihajlović	153	(South Korea) Kim Yeon-koung	147	(Australia) Rachel Rourke	135
2	(Italy) Paola Egonu	149	(Colombia) Dayana Segovia	145	(Hungary) Gréta Szakmáry	129
3	(Netherlands) Celeste Plak	142	(Peru) Ángela Leyva	144	(France) Juliette Fidon	114
4	(Japan) Sarina Koga	138	(Bulgaria) Gergana Dimitrova	143	(France) Alexandra Dascalu	101
5	(Dominican Republic) Brayelin Martínez	135	(Poland) Malwina Smarzek	134	(Australia) Eliza Hynes	100

=== Best spikers ===
Best spikers determined by successful spikes in percentage.

	GROUP 1		GROUP 2		GROUP 3	
Rank	Name	%	Name	%	Name	%
1	(Italy) Paola Egonu	49.80	(Poland) Malwina Smarzek	48.29	(Hungary) Gréta Szakmáry	43.02
2	(Thailand) Pleumjit Thinkaow	47.40	(South Korea) Kim Yeon-koung	44.56	(Australia) Rachel Rourke	40.60
3	(China) Zhu Ting	45.54	(Colombia) Dayana Segovia	41.91	(France) Alexandra Dascalu	38.97
4	(United States) Kelly Murphy	44.75	(Puerto Rico) Karina Ocasio	41.63	(Australia) Eliza Hynes	37.37
5	(United States) Madison Kingdon	44.31	(Germany) Louisa Lippmann	41.04	(Hungary) Bernadett Dékány	37.17

=== Best blockers ===
Best blockers determined by the average of stuff blocks per set.

	GROUP 1		GROUP 2		GROUP 3	
Rank	Name	Avg	Name	Avg	Name	Avg
1	(Brazil) Adenízia da Silva	1.09	(Poland) Agnieszka Kąkolewska	0.90	(Hungary) Edina Dobi	1.04
2	(Dominican Republic) Annerys Vargas	1.03	(Croatia) Bozana Butigan	0.80	(Cameroon) Stéphanie Fotso Mogoung	0.95
3	(Brazil) Ana Carolina da Silva	0.73	(Argentina) Emilce Sosa	0.73	(Trinidad and Tobago) Sinead Jack	0.86
4	(Russia) Irina Zaryazhko	0.70	(South Korea) Kim Su-ji	0.71	(Hungary) Eszter Nagy	0.70
5	(China) Yuan Xinyue	0.69	(Colombia) Melissa Rangel	0.62	Marie-France Garreau Dje	0.61

=== Best servers ===
Best servers determined by the average of aces per set.

	GROUP 1		GROUP 2		GROUP 3	
Rank	Name	Avg	Name	Avg	Name	Avg
1	(Italy) Paola Egonu	0.48	(South Korea) Yeum Hye-seon	0.55	(Australia) Rachel Rourke	0.70
2	(United States) Michelle Bartsch-Hackley	0.46	(Puerto Rico) Daly Santana	0.47	(Trinidad and Tobago) Channon Thompson	0.55
3	(Thailand) Chatchu-on Moksri	0.35	(Croatia) Bozana Butigan	0.40	(Australia) Eliza Hynes	0.50
4	(Netherlands) Yvon Beliën	0.34	(South Korea) Yang Hyo-jin	0.39	(France) Alexandra Dascalu	0.39
5	(Thailand) Nootsara Tomkom	0.32	(Poland) Joanna Wołosz	0.38	(France) Juliette Fidon	0.32

=== Best setters ===
Best setters determined by the average of running sets per set.

	GROUP 1		GROUP 2		GROUP 3	
Rank	Name	Avg	Name	Avg	Name	Avg
1	(Thailand) Nootsara Tomkom	10.62	(Colombia) María Marín	9.69	(Mexico) Sashiko Sanay	4.75
2	(Netherlands) Laura Dijkema	7.06	(Poland) Joanna Wołosz	7.83	(Hungary) Zsuzsanna Tálas	4.19
3	(Japan) Koyomi Tominaga	6.23	(Kazakhstan) Natalya Akilova	6.53	(Australia) Sophie Paine	3.63
4	(Brazil) Roberta Ratzke	5.82	(Czech Republic) Pavla Vincourová	6.34	(France) Oriane Amalric	2.32
5	(Dominican Republic) Niverka Marte	5.81	(Germany) Denise Hanke	6.16	(Cameroon) Nadege Koulla Henriette	2.09

=== Best diggers ===
Best diggers determined by the average of successful digs per set.

	GROUP 1		GROUP 2		GROUP 3	
Rank	Name	Avg	Name	Avg	Name	Avg
1	(Dominican Republic) Brenda Castillo	3.17	(Poland) Agata Witkowska	4.90	(Cameroon) Raissa Nasser	2.50
2	(Belgium) Amber De Tant	2.97	(Argentina) Tatiana Rizzo	4.18	(France) Alexandra Rochelle	2.36
3	(Netherlands) Myrthe Schoot	2.69	(South Korea) Kim Hae-ran	3.97	(Hungary) Renáta Szpin	2.33
4	(United States) Justine Wong-Orantes	2.57	(Germany) Lenka Dürr	3.35	(Australia) Alice De Innocentiis	1.87
5	(Belgium) Charlotte Leys	2.36	(Peru) Mirian Patiño	3.12	(Mexico) Freda López	1.45

=== Best receivers ===
Best receivers determined by efficient receptions in percentage.

	GROUP 1		GROUP 2		GROUP 3	
Rank	Name	%	Name	%	Name	%
1	(Italy) Monica De Gennaro	77.50	(Poland) Agata Witkowska	60.00	(France) Alexandra Rochelle	55.80
2	(Serbia) Tijana Malešević	64.07	(Peru) Mirian Patiño	59.88	(Australia) Alice De Innocentiis	39.88
3	(United States) Michelle Bartsch-Hackley	59.55	(Poland) Martyna Grajber	54.75	(Trinidad and Tobago) Afesha Olton	36.22
4	(United States) Madison Kingdon	56.00	(South Korea) Kim Yeon-koung	54.35	(Hungary) Renáta Szpin	34.93
5	(Thailand) Piyanut Pannoy	53.43	(Germany) Jennifer Geerties	54.17	(France) Juliette Fidon	34.27

== See also ==
- 2017 FIVB Volleyball World League
