= Vindevoghel =

Vindevoghel is a surname. Notable people with the surname include:

- Liesbet Vindevoghel (born 1979), Belgian volleyball player
- Maria Vindevoghel (born 1957), Belgian shop steward
