= Petya =

Petya is a Bulgarian female given name of Slavic origin. It is also a Russian diminutive name derived from the male given name Pyotr.

Petya may also refer to:

- Petya (malware), a family of encrypting ransomware discovered in 2016
- Petya-class frigate, the NATO reporting name for a class of light frigates designed in the 1950s and built for the Soviet Navy

== People ==
- Petya Barakova (born 1994), Bulgarian volleyball player
- Petya Dubarova (1962–1979), Bulgarian poet
- Petya Gavazova (born 1968), Bulgarian figure skater
- Petya Lukanova (born 1969), Bulgarian sports shooter
- Petya Lyuty (died 1919), Ukrainian military commander
- Petya Minkova, Bulgarian cyclist
- Petya Nedelcheva (born 1983), Bulgarian badminton player
- Petya Parvanova (born 1960), Bulgarian security officer and politician
- Petya Pendareva (1971–2025), Bulgarian sprinter
- Petya Petkova (born 1991), Bulgarian footballer
- Petya Strashilova (born 1965), Bulgarian middle-distance runner
- Petya Tsekova (born 1986), Bulgarian volleyball player

== Fictional characters ==
- Petya Rostov, character in Leo Tolstoy's War and Peace

== See also ==
- Petia (disambiguation)
- Pyotr
