= Rybaczewski =

Rybaczewski is a surname that may refer to:

- Anna Rybaczewski (born 1982), French female former volleyball player
- Mirosław Rybaczewski (born 1952), Polish volleyball player
