= Neruda Volley =

- Full name: Neruda Volley
- Founded: 1978
- Dissolved: 2021
- Ground: PalaResia, Bolzano, Italy (Capacity: 3,000)
- Website: Club home page

Uniforms
Home	Away

Neruda Volley was an Italian women's volleyball club based in Bronzolo. The club played in the Serie A1 in the 2015–2016 and 2016–2017 seasons.

== Previous names ==
Due to sponsorship, the club have competed under the following names:

- Neruda Volley Bolzano (1978–2013)
- Volksbank Südtirol Bolzano (2013–2015)
- Südtirol Bolzano (2015–2017)
- Maia Dentis Neruda Bolzano (2017–2021)

== History ==
Founded in 1978 as a cultural club dedicated to Pablo Neruda, volleyball become one of the club's activities in the early 1980s as youth teams began to compete in the regional leagues. The team did well achieving promotions but for financial reasons it declined competing at the higher national leagues. That changed in 2008 when Rudy Favretto became its president with a project to bring the club to the forefront of Italian volleyball. Personnel with experience at the Italian national youth teams were brought into the club and in 2012, the club acquired a licence to play in the Serie B1 from Pallavolo Vigevano. After playoffs and repechage the club gain promotion to the Serie A2 in 2013 and moved to the PalaResia.

The club reached the Serie A1 in 2015. Ahead of the 2017–18 season, the club announced it would not participate in Serie A1, due to lack of financial resources. The club was confirmed to play the Serie B1 in 2017–18.

== Team ==
This was the last team which played in the Serie A1, Season 2016–2017, as of February 2017.

Number	Player	Position	Height (m)	Birth date
1	(Italy) Floriana Bertone	Middle blocker	2.02	19 November 1992 (age 32)
2	(Italy) Alessia Zancanaro	Libero	1.68	23 April 1998 (age 27)
3	(Italy) Eleonora Bruno	Libero	1.80	15 April 1994 (age 31)
5	(Croatia) Matea Ikic	Outside hitter	1.85	25 May 1989 (age 36)
6	(Czech Republic) Tereza Rossi Matuszkova	Outside hitter	1.92	3 December 1982 (age 42)
7	(Italy) Natasha Spinello	Setter	1.73	15 December 1998 (age 26)
8	(France) Christina Bauer	Middle blocker	1.96	1 January 1998 (age 27)
9	(Italy) Valeria Papa	Outside hitter	1.83	9 September 1989 (age 35)
10	(Italy) Giulia Pincerato	Setter	1.82	16 March 1987 (age 38)
11	(Croatia) Sanja Popović	Opposite	1.86	31 May 1984 (age 41)
14	(United States) Michelle Bartsch	Outside hitter	1.92	12 February 1990 (age 35)
18	(Italy) Marina Zambelli	Middle blocker	1.87	1 January 1990 (age 35)
