= Lauranne Dautais =

French volleyball player (born 1973)

Personal information
- Nationality: French
- Born: 20 June 1973 (age 53); Nantes, France
- Height: 175 cm (69 in)
- Weight: 70 kg (154 lb)
- Spike: 304 cm (120 in)
- Block: 292 cm (115 in)

Volleyball information
- Number: 4 (national team)

Career
Years	Teams
2001	(France) RC de Cannes

National team
2001	France

Lauranne Dautais (born 20 June 1973) is a French female former volleyball player. She was part of the France women's national volleyball team.

She competed at the 2001 Women's European Volleyball Championship. On club level she played for RC de Cannes in 2001.
