= Alice De Innocentiis =

Italian-born Australian volleyball player

Personal information
- Nationality: Australian
- Born: 4 June 1984 (age 42); Rivoli, Italy
- Hometown: Leeming
- Height: 167 cm (66 in)
- Weight: 66 kg (146 lb)
- Spike: 278 cm (109 in)
- Block: 248 cm (98 in)

Volleyball information
- Position: Libero
- Current club: Australian National Team
- Number: 6 (national team)

Career
Years	Teams
2016	UTSSU Sydney

National team
2015 – Current	Australia

Alice De Innocentiis (born 4 June 1984) is an Italian-born Australian female volleyball player. She is part of the Australian women's national volleyball team.

She participated at the 2016 FIVB Volleyball World Grand Prix, and 2017 FIVB Volleyball World Grand Prix and 2017 World Qualification Tournament.
