= Petia =

Petia may refer to:

- Montréal–Pierre Elliott Trudeau International Airport (PETIA)
- Petia, a village in Buneşti Commune, Suceava County, Romania

== People ==
- Petia (singer), singer, songwriter and actress
- Petia Arnaudova, Bulgarian physician and author

== See also ==
- Petya (disambiguation)
