= Laure Koenig =

French volleyball player (born 1975)

Personal information
- Nationality: French
- Born: 18 April 1975 (age 51)
- Height: 183 cm (72 in)
- Weight: 69 kg (152 lb)
- Spike: 305 cm (120 in)
- Block: 285 cm (112 in)

Volleyball information
- Number: 7 (national team)

Career
Years	Teams
2001	(France) RC de Cannes

National team
2001	France

Laure Koenig (born 18 April 1975) is a French female former volleyball player. She was part of the France women's national volleyball team.

She competed at the 2001 Women's European Volleyball Championship. On club level she played for RC de Cannes in 2001.
