= Eliza Hynes =

Australian rules footballer and volleyball player

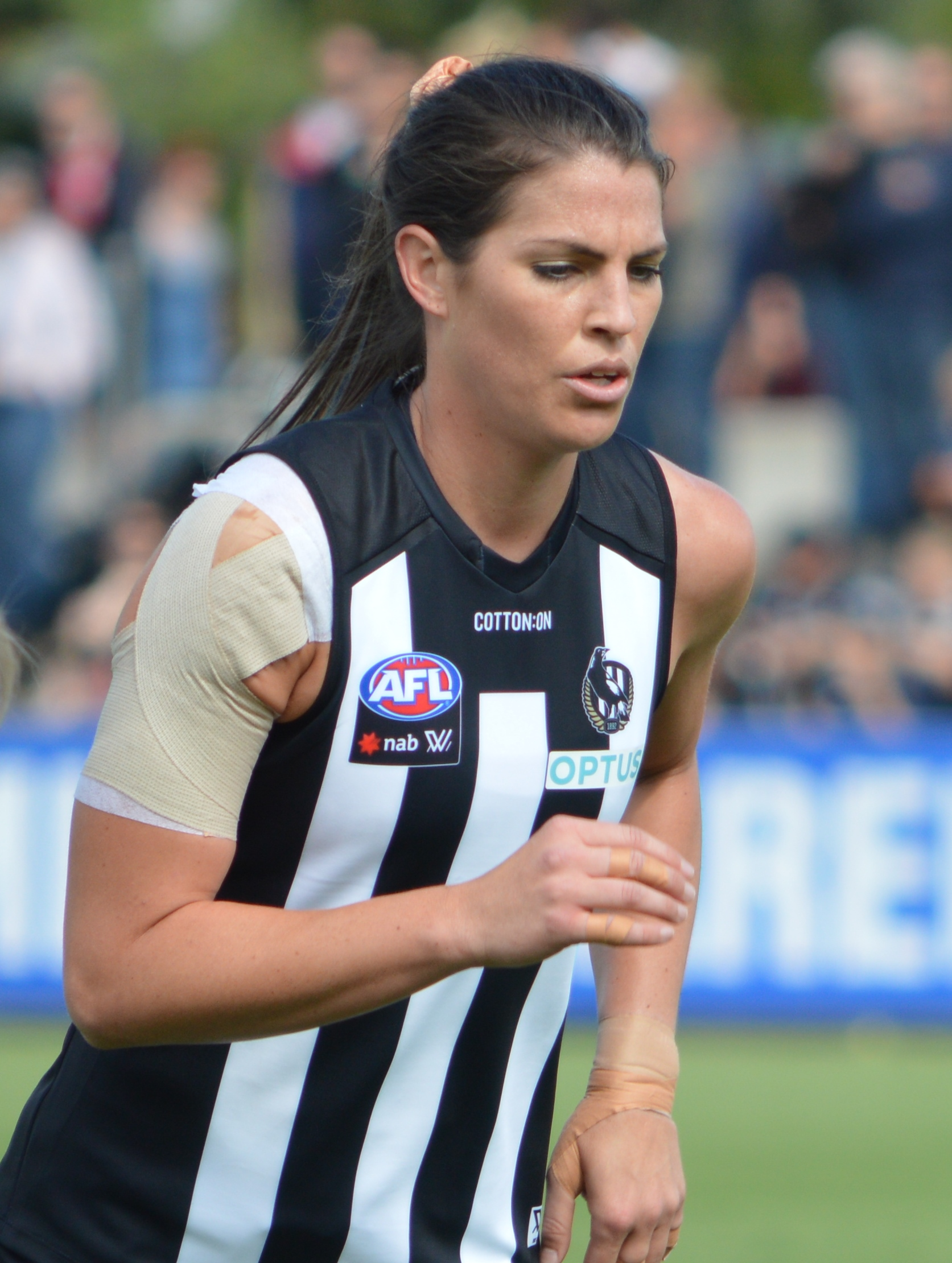
- Hynes playing Australian rules football with Collingwood in February 2019
- Born: 29 January 1992 (age 34); Bendigo, Australia
- Volleyball career
- Height: 183 cm (72 in)
- Weight: 70 kg (154 lb)
- Spike: 305 cm (120 in)
- Block: 292 cm (115 in)
- Number: 15 (national team)

Career
- Years: Team
- 2013: Victoria Volleyball Academy

National team
- Years: Team
- 2013–: Australia
Australian rules football career
Personal information
- Debut: Round 1, 2018, Collingwood vs. Carlton, at IKON Park
- Height: 183 cm (6 ft 0 in)
- Weight: 70 kg (154 lb)
- Position: Forward / ruck
Club information
- Current club: Collingwood
- Number: 11
Playing career^{1}
Years	Club	Games (Goals)
2018–2020	Collingwood	11 (0)
- ^{1} Playing statistics correct to the end of the 2020 season.

Eliza Karley Hynes (born 29 January 1992) is an Australian volleyball and beach volleyball player, and an Australian rules footballer.

== Volleyball career ==
Hynes played beach volleyball together with Taliqua Clancy from 2010 to 2012. They won the bronze medal at the 2010 FIVB Beach Volleyball U19 World Championships.

She was first selected to be part of the senior Australia women's national volleyball team for a tour of Vietnam in March 2013. She then participated in the 2014 FIVB Volleyball World Grand Prix. At club level she played professionally for Orivesi's OrPo volleyball club in Finland's national women's league in 2013, and for Victoria Volleyball Academy in 2014.

== AFL Women's career ==
On 21 May 2017, it was reported that Hynes had been signed by Collingwood as a rookie for the 2018 AFL Women's season. She had no prior experience playing Australian football, but hopes to play as a forward.

On 4 June 2018, Hynes was elevated to Collingwood's senior list ahead of the 2019 season.

In June 2020, Hynes retired from football.

=== Statistics ===
Statistics are correct to the end of the 2020 season.

Legend
G	Goals	K	Kicks	D	Disposals	T	Tackles
B	Behinds	H	Handballs	M	Marks

Season	Team	No.	Games	Totals							Averages (per game)						
Season	Team	No.	Games	G	B	K	H	D	M	T	G	B	K	H	D	M	T
2018	Collingwood	11	2	0	0	4	6	10	1	1	0.0	0.0	2.0	3.0	5.0	0.5	0.5
2019	Collingwood	11	6	0	0	8	18	26	6	16	0.0	0.0	1.3	3.0	4.3	1.0	2.7
2020	Collingwood	11	3	0	0	7	9	16	2	6	0.0	0.0	2.3	3.0	5.3	0.7	2.0
Career			11	0	0	19	25	52	9	23	0.0	0.0	1.7	3.0	4.7	0.8	2.1
