= Rebeca Pazo =

Spanish volleyball player (born 1983)

Personal information
- Nationality: Spanish
- Born: 7 June 1983 (age 43)

Volleyball information
- Position: Outside hitter
- Number: 17 (national team)

Career
Years	Teams
2007	AD Pinguela

National team
2007	Spain

Rebeca Pazo (born 7 June 1983) is a Spanish female former volleyball player, playing as an outside hitter. She was part of the Spain women's national volleyball team.

She competed at the 2007 Women's European Volleyball Championship. On club level she played for AD Pinguela in 2007.
