= Anja Van Damme =

Belgian volleyball player (born 1986)

Personal information
- Nationality: Belgian
- Born: 7 August 1986 (age 40)

Volleyball information
- Position: outside hitter
- Number: 18 (national team)

Career
Years	Teams
2007	Asteríx Kieldrecht

National team
2007	Belgium

Anja Van Damme (born 7 August 1986) was a Belgian female volleyball player, playing as an outside hitter. She was part of the Belgium women's national volleyball team.

She competed at the 2007 Women's European Volleyball Championship. On club level she played for Asteríx Kieldrecht in 2007.
