= Félicia Menara =

French volleyball player (born 1991)

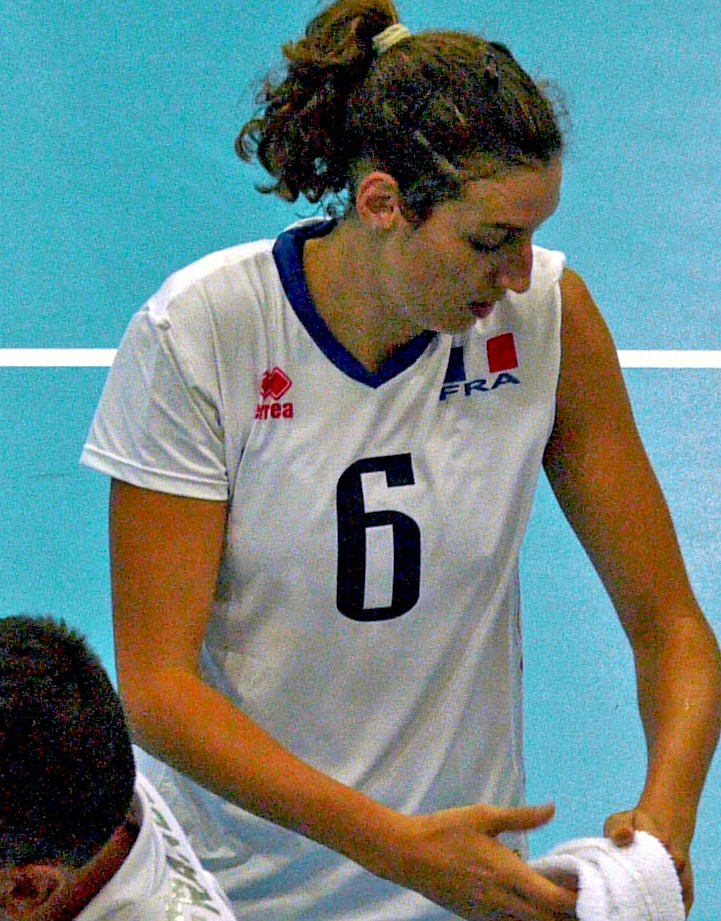

Personal information
- Nationality: French
- Born: 23 June 1991 (age 35)

Volleyball information
- Position: Setter
- Number: 3 (national team)

Career
Years	Teams
2009	IFVB Tolosa

National team
2009	France

Félicia Menara (born 23 June 1991) is a French female former volleyball player, playing as a setter. She was part of the France women's national volleyball team.

She competed at the 2009 Women's European Volleyball Championship. On club level she played for IFVB Tolosa in 2009.
