= Yuliya Markouskaya =

Belarusian volleyball player (born 1982)

Yuliya Markouskaya (born 29 May 1982) is a Belarusian volleyball player.

She competed at the 2009 Women's European Volleyball Championship, 2011 Women's European Volleyball League. and 2015 FIVB Volleyball Women's European Cup.

She played for Atlant BarSU, Severodonchanka Severodonec, and Minchanka Minsk.
