= Angie Bland =

Belgian volleyball player (born 1984)

Personal information
- Nationality: Belgium
- Born: 26 April 1984 (age 42)
- Height: 1.87 m (6 ft 2 in)
- Weight: 65 kg (143 lb)
- Spike: 306 cm (120 in)
- Block: 298 cm (117 in)

Volleyball information
- Number: 1

Career
Years	Teams
2014	(France) Volley-Ball Nantes
Honours
Women's volleyball
Representing Belgium
European Championships
Bronze medal – third place	2013 Germany	Team

Angie Bland (born 26 April 1984) is a Belgian female volleyball player. She is a member of the Belgium women's national volleyball team and played for Volley-Ball Nantes in 2014.

She was part of the Belgian national team at the 2014 FIVB Volleyball Women's World Championship in Italy.

== Clubs ==
- (France) Volley-Ball Nantes (2014)
- 🇫🇷 ASPTT Mulhouse (2015–present)
