= Denitsa Karaulanova =

Bulgarian volleyball player

Personal information
- Nationality: Bulgarian
- Born: 25 September 1979 (age 47)

Volleyball information
- Position: central
- Number: 2 (national team)

National team
| 2007 | Bulgaria |

Denitsa Karaulanova (Bulgarian: Деница Карауланова) (born 25 September 1979) is a Bulgarian female former volleyball player, playing as a central. She was part of the Bulgaria women's national volleyball team.

She competed at the 2007 Women's European Volleyball Championship, and at the 2009 Women's European Volleyball Championship.
