= Amandine Mauricette =

French volleyball player (born 1985)

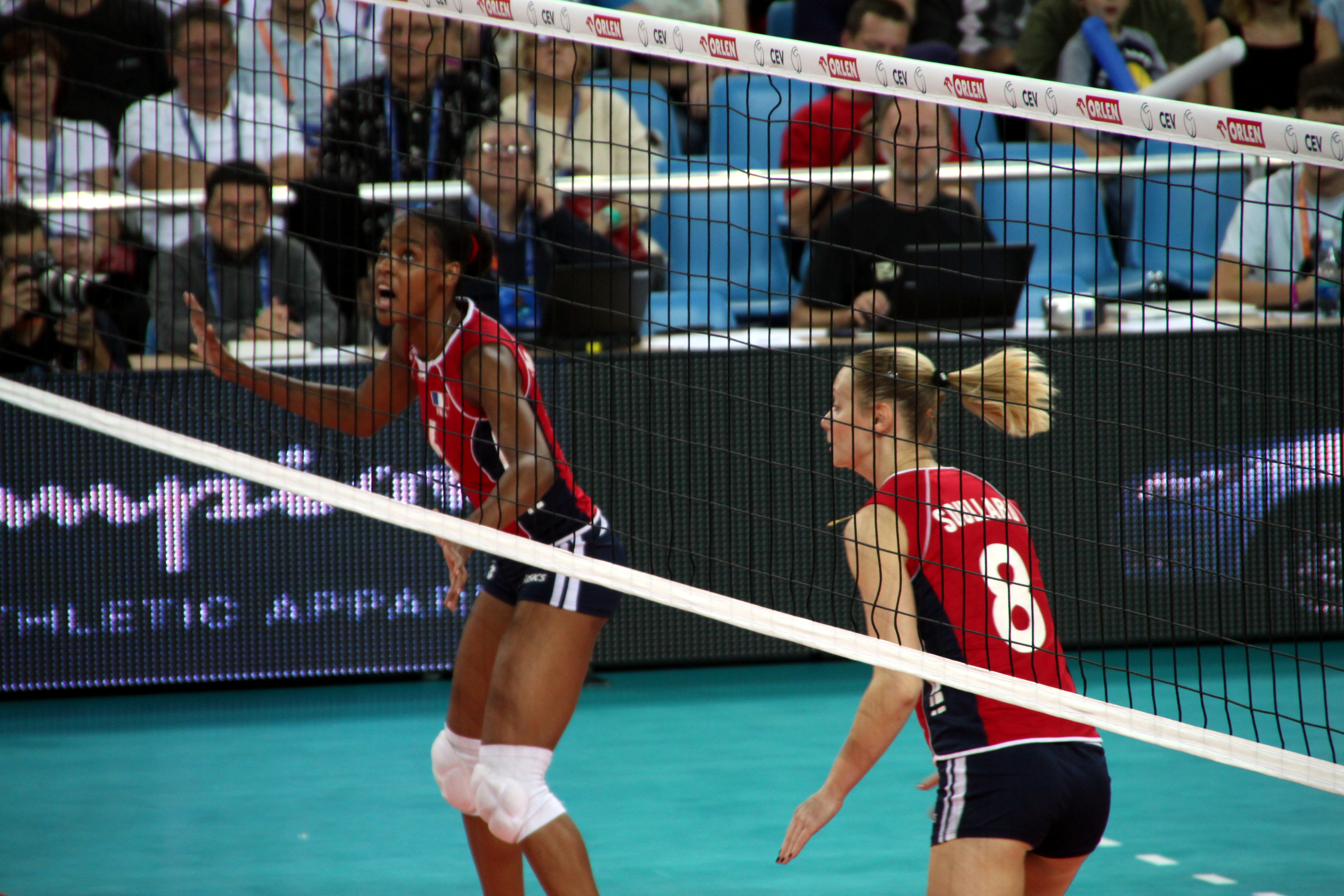
- Amandine Mauricette and Pauline Soullard

Personal information
- Nationality: French
- Born: 1 June 1985 (age 41)

Volleyball information
- Position: Opposite
- Number: 6 (national team)

Career
Years	Teams
2009	Vennelles VB

National team
2009	France

Amandine Mauricette (born 1 June 1985) is a French female former volleyball player, playing as an opposite. She was part of the France women's national volleyball team.

She competed at the 2009 Women's European Volleyball Championship. On club level she played for Vennelles VB in 2009.
