= Pauline Soullard =

French volleyball player (born 1985)

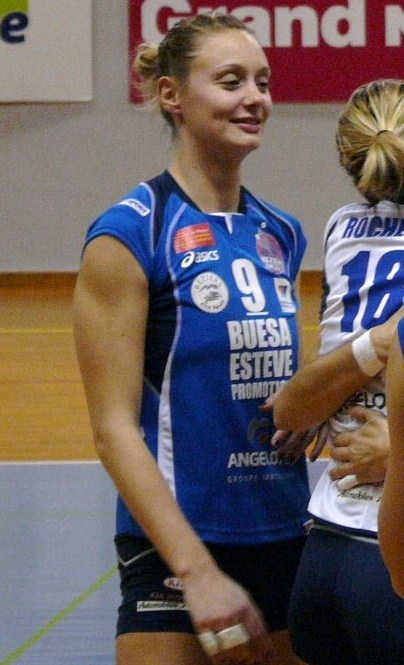
- A French female volleyball player

Personal information
- Nationality: French
- Born: 24 April 1985 (age 41); Cholet, France
- Height: 183 cm (72 in)
- Weight: 66 kg (146 lb)

Volleyball information
- Position: central
- Number: 1 (national team)

Career
Years	Teams
2011	Béziers Volley

National team
2011	France

Pauline Soullard (born 24 April 1985) was a French female volleyball player, playing as a central. She was part of the France women's national volleyball team.

She competed at the 2011 Women's European Volleyball Championship. On club level she played for Béziers Volley.
