= Ana Ramírez (volleyball) =

Spanish volleyball player (born 1981)

Personal information
- Nationality: Spanish
- Born: 4 November 1981 (age 44)
- Height: 177 cm (5 ft 10 in)

Volleyball information
- Position: Libero
- Number: 4 (national team)

Career
Years	Teams
2009	Diego Porcelos

National team
2003-2011	Spain

Ana Ramírez (born 4 November 1981) is a Spanish female former volleyball player, playing as a libero. She was part of the Spain women's national volleyball team.

She competed at the 2009 Women's European Volleyball Championship. On club level she played for Diego Porcelos in 2009.
