= Lidiya Maksimenko =

Azerbaijani volleyball player (born 1981)

Personal information
- Nationality: Azerbaijani
- Born: 19 March 1981 (age 45)

Volleyball information
- Position: Outside-spiker
- Number: 11 (national team)

Career
Years	Teams
2009	Azərreyl Baku

National team
2009	Azerbaijan

Lidiya Maksimenko (born 19 March 1981) is an Azerbaijani female former volleyball player, playing as an outside-spiker. She was part of the Azerbaijan women's national volleyball team.

She competed at the 2009 Women's European Volleyball Championship. At club level she played for Azərreyl Baku.
