= Rachel Rourke =

Australian volleyball player (born 1988)

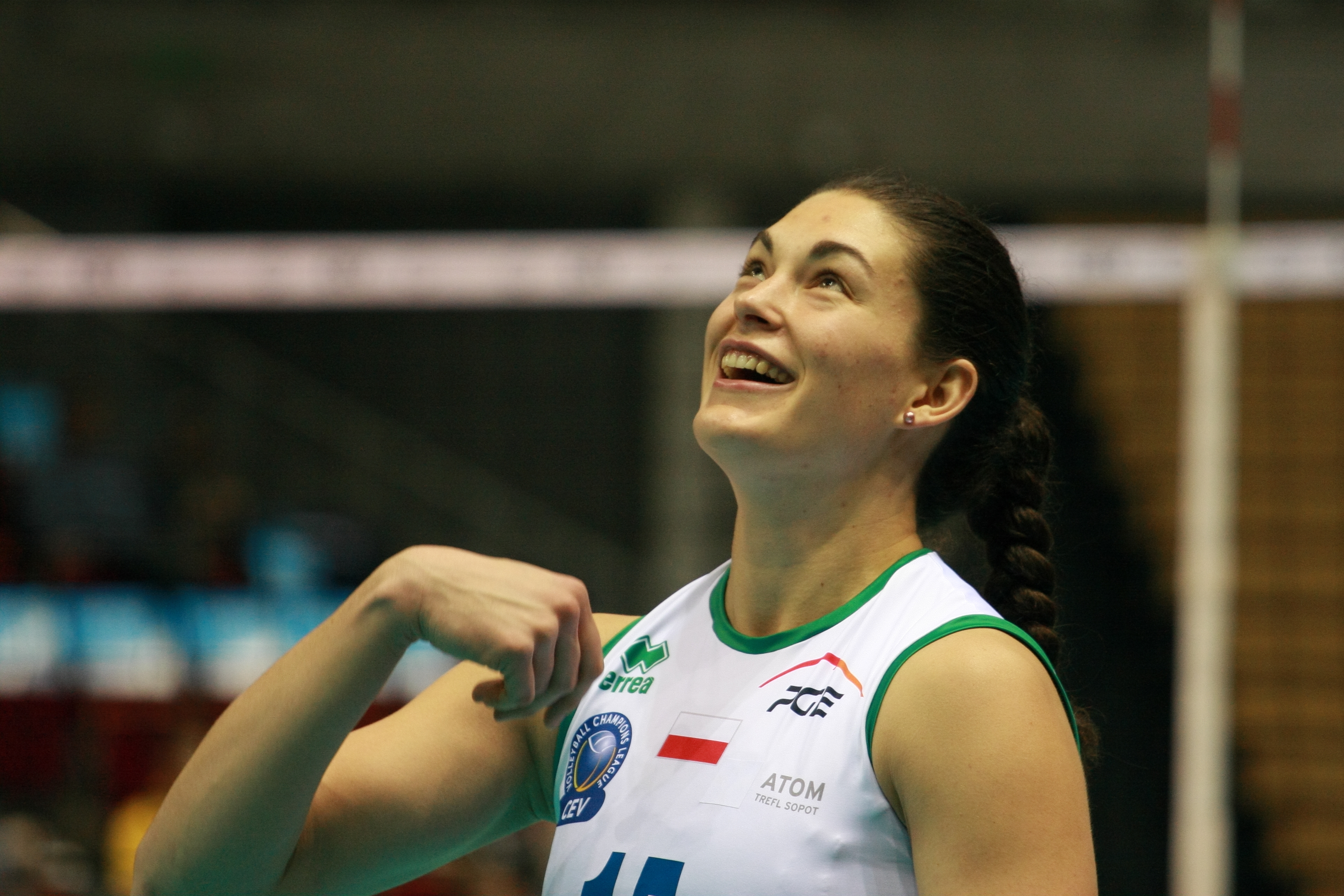

Personal information
- Nationality: Australian
- Born: 1 October 1988 (age 38)
- Height: 197 cm (78 in)
- Weight: 85 kg (187 lb)
- Spike: 315 cm (124 in)
- Block: 300 cm (118 in)
- Education: Oregon State University

Volleyball information
- Number: 9 (national team)

Career
Years	Teams
2014-2015; 2015; 2018	Incheon Heungkuk Life; Sichuan; Beijing

National team
2005- Present	Australia

Rachel Rourke (born 1 October 1988) is an Australian female volleyball player. She is part of the Australia women's national volleyball team.

She participated in the 2014 FIVB Volleyball World Grand Prix. On club level she played for Incheon Pink Spiders in 2014.
