= Alexandra Rochelle =

French volleyball player (born 1983)

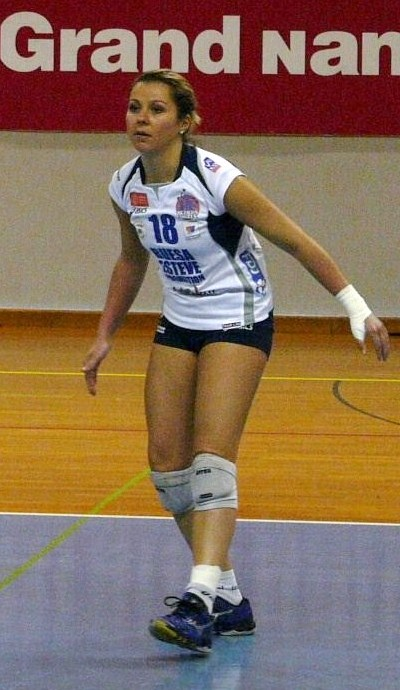

Personal information
- Nationality: French
- Born: 14 December 1983 (age 42)
- Height: 168 cm (5 ft 6 in)
- Weight: 65 kg (143 lb)

Volleyball information
- Position: libero
- Number: 18 (national team)

Career
Years	Teams
2013	Béziers Volley

National team
2013	France

Alexandra Rochelle (born 14 December 1983) is a French female former volleyball player, playing as a libero. She was part of the France women's national volleyball team.

She competed at the 2013 Women's European Volleyball Championship. On club level she played for Béziers Volley.
