= Alexia Djilali =

French volleyball player (born 1987)

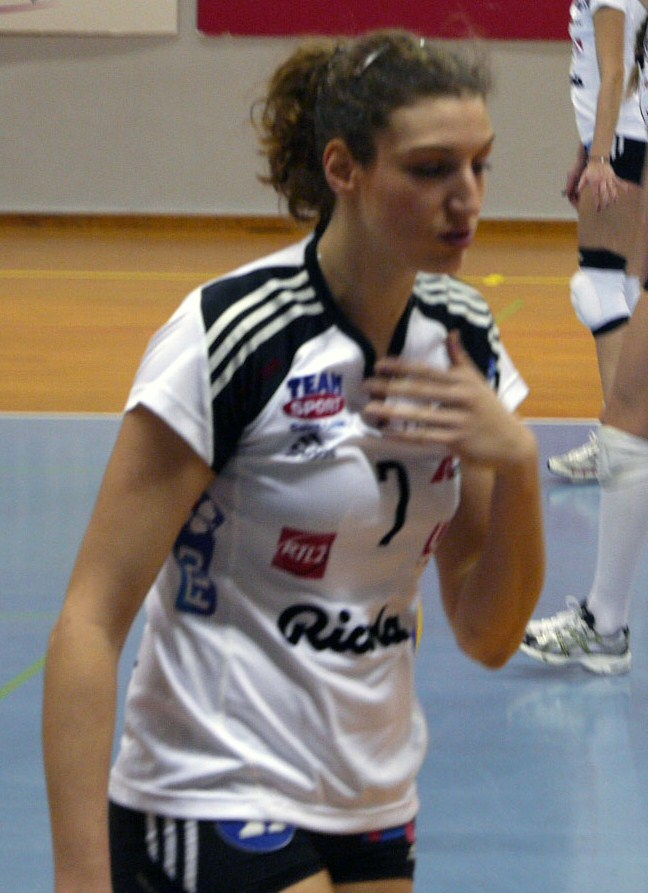

Personal information
- Nationality: French
- Born: 27 October 1987 (age 39)

Volleyball information
- Position: Opposite
- Number: 13 (national team)

Career
Years	Teams
2009	ASPTT Mulhouse

National team
2009	France

Alexia Djilali (born 27 October 1987) is a French female former volleyball player, playing as an opposite. She was part of the France women's national volleyball team.

She competed at the 2013 Women's European Volleyball Championship. On club level she played for ASPTT Mulhouse in 2013.
