= Christina Bauer =

French volleyball player (born 1988)

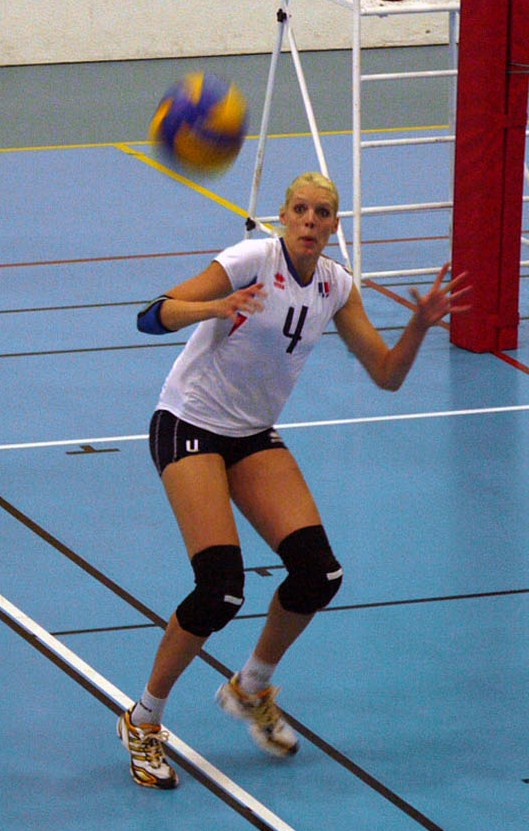
- Bauer with RC Cannes in 2018

Personal information
- Full name: Christina Bauer
- Born: 1 January 1988 (age 38); Bergen, Norway
- Height: 1.96 m (6 ft 5 in)
- Weight: 79 kg (174 lb)
- Spike: 3.16 m (10 ft 4 in)
- Block: 3.05 m (10 ft 0 in)

Volleyball information
- Position: Middle-blocker

National team
France

Christina Bauer (born 1 January 1988) is a French volleyball player. She represented the France national team at the 2007 Women’s European Volleyball Championship, and 2024 Summer Olympics.

She was born in Bergen, Norway during a Christmas holiday to a French father, Jean-Luc Bauer, a professional volleyball player, and a Norwegian mother, Tone Bauer, a handball player who played several years in France. She also has a younger sister who played professionally for Le Cannet Volleyball Anne-Sophie Bauer. She speaks French, Norwegian, English and is learning Italian after being called to play for Yamamay Busto Arsizio.

== Clubs ==
Club	Country	From	To
Pfastatt	France	1998–1999	1999–2000
VB Club Kingersheim	France	2000–2001	2003–2004
ASPTT Mulhouse	France	2004–2005	2009–2010
Yamamay Busto Arsizio	Italy	2010–2011	2012-2013
Fenerbahçe	Turkey	2013–2014	2014–2015
Nordmeccanica Piacenza	Italy	2015–2016	2015–2016
Neruda Volley	Italy	2016–2017	2016–2017
Racing Club Cannes	France	2017-2018	2018-2019
ASPTT Mulhouse	France	2020-2021	2020-2021
Black Angels Perugia Volley	Italy	2021–2022	2021–2022
Pays d'Aix Venelles Volley-Ball	France	2022-2023	2023-2024
LOVB Houston	United States	2024-2025	2024-2025

== Awards ==
=== Club ===
- 2011–12 CEV Cup – Champion, with Yamamay Busto Arsizio
- 2012–13 CEV Champions League – Bronze medal, with Yamamay Busto Arsizio
- 2013-14 CEV Cup – Champion, with Fenerbahçe Istanbul
- 2014-15 Turkish Cup – Champion, with Fenerbahçe Grundig Istanbul
- 2014–15 Turkish Women's Volleyball League – Champion, with Fenerbahçe Grundig Istanbul
