= Liesbet Vindevoghel =

Belgian volleyball player (born 1979)

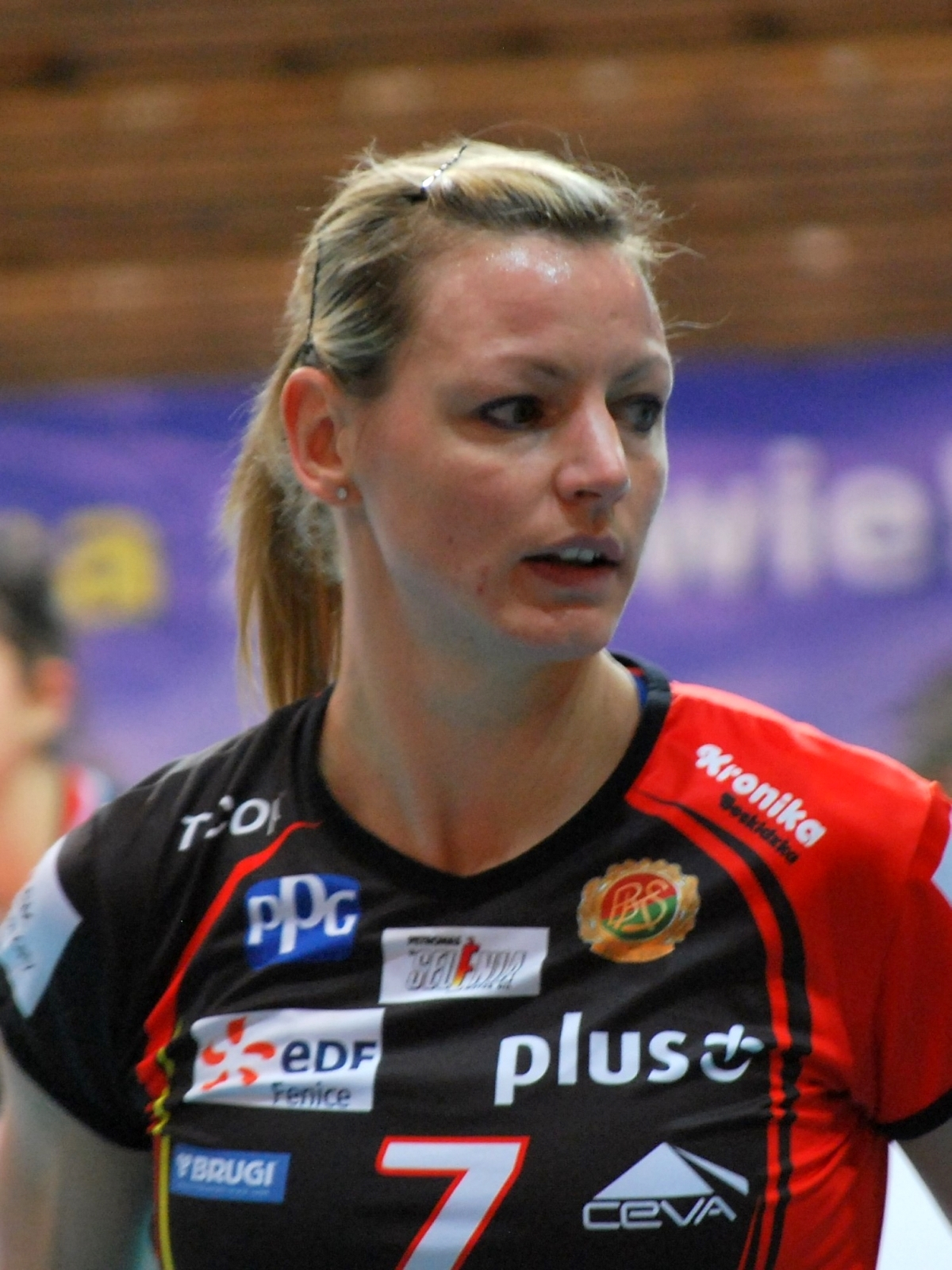
- Vindevoghe in 2012

Personal information
- Nationality: Belgian
- Born: 29 December 1979 (age 46)

Volleyball information
- Position: Outside-spiker
- Number: 7 (national team)

Career
Years	Teams
2009	BV Nocera Umbra

National team
2009	Belgium

Liesbet Vindevoghel (born 29 December 1979) is a Belgian female former volleyball player, playing as an outside-spiker. She was part of the Belgium women's national volleyball team.

She competed at the 2009 Women's European Volleyball Championship. On club level she played for BV Nocera Umbra.
