= Petya Tsekova =

Bulgarian volleyball player (born 1986)

Personal information
- Nationality: Bulgarian
- Born: 13 October 1986 (age 40)

Volleyball information
- Position: right side hitter
- Number: 16 (national team)

National team
2007	Bulgaria

Petya Tsekova (Bulgarian: Петя Цекова) (born 13 October 1986) is a Bulgarian volleyball player, playing as a right side hitter. She was part of the Bulgaria women's national volleyball team.

She competed at the 2007 Women's European Volleyball Championship, and at the 2009 Women's European Volleyball Championship,
