= Armelle Faesch =

French volleyball player (born 1981)

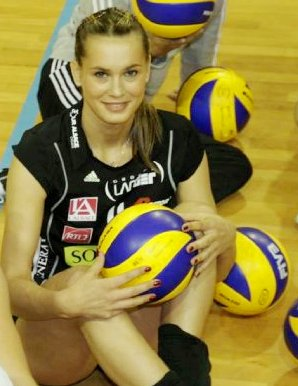
- Image of Armelle Faesch

Personal information
- Nationality: French
- Born: 26 December 1981 (age 44); Mulhouse, France
- Height: 183 cm (72 in)
- Weight: 67 kg (148 lb)

Volleyball information
- Position: setter
- Number: 11 (national team)

Career
Years	Teams
2011	ASPTT Mulhouse

National team
2011	France

Armelle Faesch (born 26 December 1981) is a French female former volleyball player, playing as a setter. She was part of the France women's national volleyball team.

She competed at the 2011 Women's European Volleyball Championship. On club level she played for ASPTT Mulhouse.
