= France women's national volleyball team =

Women's national volleyball team representing France

France
- Association: Fédération française de volley-ball
- Confederation: CEV
- Head coach: Cesar Hernández González
- FIVB ranking: 13 (24 May 2026)

Uniforms
Home	Away

Summer Olympics
- Appearances: 1 (First in 2024)
- Best result: 11th place (2024)

World Championship
- Appearances: 4 (First in 1952)
- Best result: 7th place (1952)
- French Volleyball Federation (in French)
Honours
Challenger Cup
Gold medal – first place	2023 Laval	Team
European Volleyball League
Gold medal – first place	2022 Orléans
Savaria Cup
Gold medal – first place	2019 Szombathely
Tournoi de France
Silver medal – second place	2022 Belfort/Chaumont/Sélestat/Metz

The France women's national volleyball team represents France in international women's volleyball competitions and friendly matches. It is governed by the French Volleyball Federation.

== Results ==
=== Olympic Games ===
Champions Runners up Third place Fourth place

Summer Olympics record
Year	Round	Position	Pld	W	L	SW	SL	Squad
(Japan) 1964	did not qualify							
(Mexico) 1968	did not qualify							
(West Germany) 1972	did not qualify							
(Canada) 1976	did not qualify							
(Soviet Union) 1980	did not qualify							
(United States) 1984	did not qualify							
(South Korea) 1988	did not qualify							
(Spain) 1992	did not qualify							
(United States) 1996	did not qualify							
(Australia) 2000	did not qualify							
(Greece) 2004	did not qualify							
(China) 2008	did not qualify							
(United Kingdom) 2012	did not qualify							
(Brazil) 2016	did not qualify							
(Japan) 2020	did not qualify							
(France) 2024	Preliminary round	11th	3	0	3	0	9	Squad
(United States) 2028	To be determined							
(Australia) 2032	To be determined							
Total	0 Titles	1/18	3	0	3	0	9	

=== World Championship ===
Champions Runners up Third place Fourth place

World Championship record
Year	Round	Position	Pld	W	L	SW	SL	Squad
(Soviet Union) 1952	Round Robin	7th Place	7	1	6	5	18	
(France) 1956	11th–17th places	12th Place	8	5	3	17	9	
(Brazil) 1960	did not enter							
(Soviet Union) 1962	did not enter							
(Japan) 1967	did not enter							
(Bulgaria) 1970	did not qualify							
(Mexico) 1974	19th–24th places	20th Place	10	5	5	17	16	
(Soviet Union) 1978	did not qualify							
(Peru) 1982	did not qualify							
(Czechoslovakia) 1986	did not qualify							
(China) 1990	did not qualify							

World Championship record
Year	Round	Position	Pld	W	L	SW	SL	Squad
(Brazil) 1994	did not qualify							
(Japan) 1998	did not qualify							
(Germany) 2002	did not qualify							
(Japan) 2006	did not qualify							
(Japan) 2010	did not qualify							
(Italy) 2014	did not qualify							
(Japan) 2018	did not qualify							
(Netherlands) / (Poland) 2022	did not qualify							
(Thailand) 2025	Quarterfinals	8th Place	5	3	2	11	9	
(Canada) / (United States) 2027	to be determined							
(Philippines) 2029	to be determined							
Total	0 Titles	4/22	30	14	16	50	52	—

=== World Grand Prix ===
- 2017 — 27th

=== Nations League ===
Nations League record
Year	Round	Position	GP	MW	ML	SW	SL	Squad
(China) 2018	did not qualify							
(China) 2019	did not qualify							
(Italy) 2021	did not qualify							
(Turkey) 2022	did not qualify							
(United States) 2023	did not qualify							
(Thailand) 2024	Preliminary round	14th	12	2	10	10	32	Squad
(Poland) 2025	Preliminary round	9th	12	5	7	23	25	Squad
(Macau) 2026	Preliminary round	17th	12	3	9	17	32	Squad
(N/A) 2027	qualified							
Total	4/9		36	10	26	50	89	—

=== Challenger Cup ===
- 2018 — did not qualify
- 2019 — did not qualify
- 2022 — 5th place
- 2023 — (gold) Champions
- 2024 — did not enter

=== European Championship ===
- 1991 — 9th place (tied)
- 1993 — did not qualify
- 1995 — did not qualify
- 1997 — did not qualify
- 1999 — did not qualify
- 2001 — 8th place
- 2003 — did not qualify
- 2005 — did not qualify
- 2007 — 8th place
- 2009 — 14th place (tied)
- 2011 — 10th place
- 2013 — 8th place
- 2015 — did not qualify
- 2017 — did not qualify
- 2019 — 21st place
- 2021 — 7th place
- 2023 — 6th place
- 2026 — 10th place

=== European League ===
- 2022 — (gold) Champions

== Team ==
=== Current squad ===
Roster for the 2024 Summer Olympics. The roster was announced on 8 July 2024.

Head coach: (Belgium) Émile Rousseaux

- 1 Héléna Cazaute (c) OH
- 3 Amandine GiardinoL
- 4 Christina Bauer MB
- 7 Iman Ndiaye OP
- 9 Nina Stojiljković S
- 11 Lucille Gicquel OP
- 15 Amandha Marine Sylves MB
- 23 Léandra Olinga-Andela MB
- 63 Émilie Respaut S
- 88 Amélie Rotar OH
- 91 Halimatou Bah OH
- 99 Juliette Gelin L

=== Past squads ===
- 2001 European Championship — 8th place
  - Lauranne Dautais, Karine Havas, Virginie Kadjo, Sandra Kociniewski, Laure Koenig, Séverine Lienard, Sylvie Lopes, Kinga Maculewicz, Karine Salinas, Virginie Sarpaux, Séverine Szewczyk, and Sandra Urios. Head Coach: Jue Gang-Bai.
- 2007 European Championship — 8th place
  - Christina Bauer, Alexia Djilali, Armelle Faesch, Sandra Kociniewski, Jelena Lozancic, Estelle Querard, Victoria Ravva, Alexandra Rochelle, Anna Rybaczewski, Karine Salinas, Hélène Schleck, Leslie Turiaf. Head coach: Yan Fang.
- 2009 European Championship — 14th place
  - Véronika Hudima, Félicia Menara, Christina Bauer, Amandine Mauricette, Pauline Soullard, Anna Rybaczewski, Maëva Orlé, Armelle Faesch, Déborah Ortschitt, Alexia Djilali, Séverine Liénard, Séverine Szewczyk, Estelle Quérard, Jelena Lozančić. Head coach: Fabrice Vial.
- 2011 European Championship — 10th place
  - Pauline Soullard, Véronika Hudima, Taiana Téré, Christina Bauer, Alexandra Rochelle, Jelena Lozančić, Anna Rybaczewski, Maëva Orlé, Armelle Faesch, Mallory Steux, Julie Mollinger, Hélène Schleck, Alexandra Dascalu, Marielle Bousquet. Head coach: Fabrice Vial.

== See also ==
- France men's national volleyball team
