= Sanja Popović =

Croatian volleyball player (born 1984)

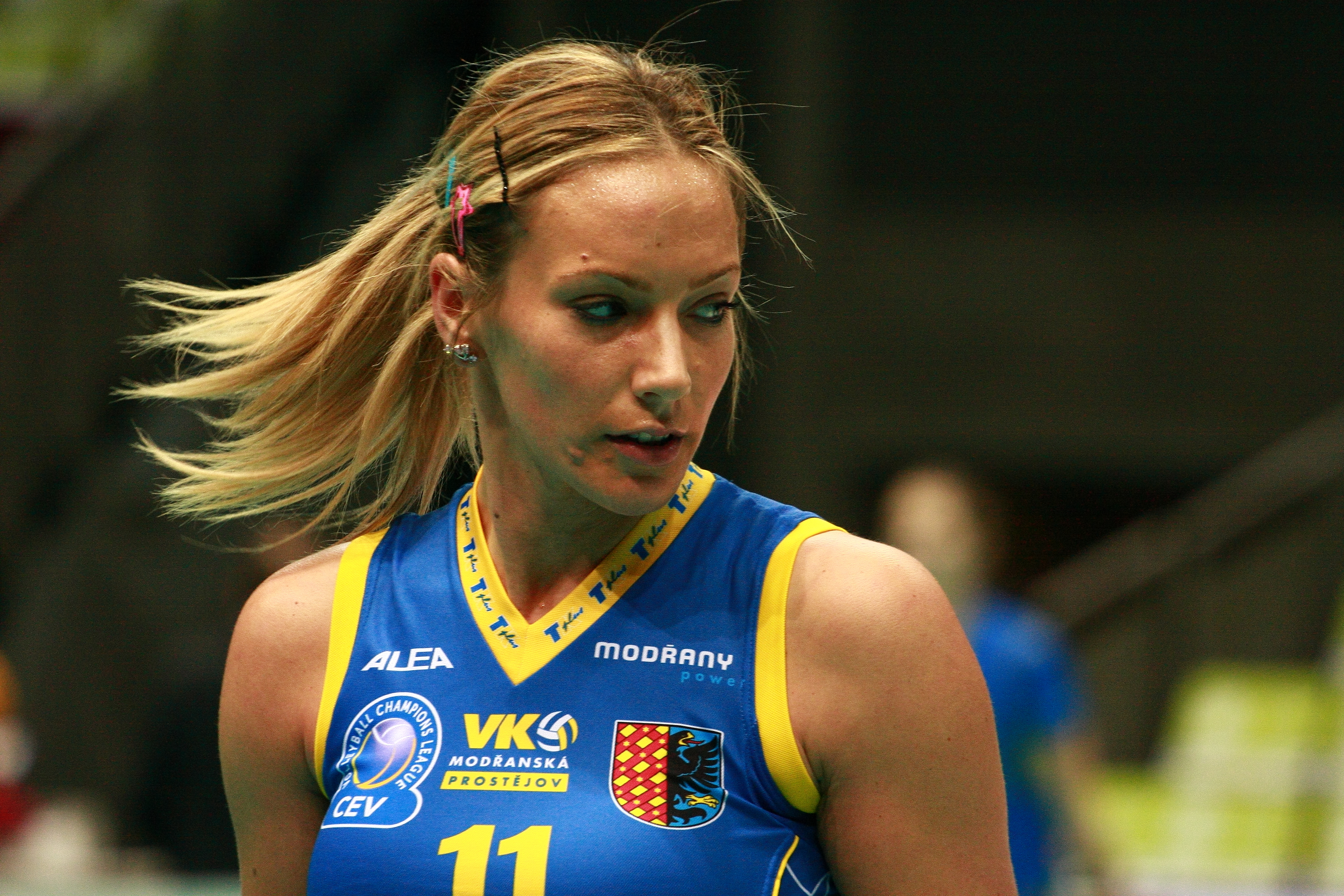
- Popović in 2011 playing for VK Prostějov

Personal information
- Born: 31 May 1984 (age 42); Rijeka, SR Croatia, SFR Yugoslavia
- Height: 1.90 m (6 ft 3 in)
- Weight: 79 kg (174 lb)
- Spike: 314 cm (124 in)
- Block: 300 cm (118 in)

Coaching information
- Current team: ŽOK Rijeka
Previous teams coached
Years	Teams
2024–	ŽOK Rijeka

Volleyball information
- Position: Opposite spiker

Career
Years	Teams
1998–1999; 1999–2003; 2003–2006; 2006–2008; 2008–2009; 2009–2010; 2010–2011; 2011; 2011–2012; 2012–2013; 2013–2014; 2014–2015; 2015; 2015–2016; 2016–2017; 2017–2018; 2018–2019; 2019–2020; 2020–2021	OK Kastav; ŽOK Rijeka; HAOK Mladost; Asystel Novara; Chieri Volley; Beşiktaş; Sirio Perugia; GS Caltex Seoul; VK Prostějov; Muszynianka Muszyna; WVC Dynamo Moscow; Organika Budowlani Łódź; Leningradka; MKS Dąbrowa Górnicza; Neruda Volley; Samsun BŞB Anakent; KPS Chemik Police; CSM Volei Alba Blaj; Vasas SC

National team
2005–2020	Croatia
Medal record
Women's volleyball
Representing Croatia
Mediterranean Games
Bronze medal – third place	2009 Pescara	Team
Gold medal – first place	2018 Tarragona	Team
European League
Silver medal – second place	2019 Varaždin	Team

Sanja Popović Gamma (born 31 May 1984) is a Croatian volleyball player. She last played as opposite spiker for Vasas SC.

She competed at the 2010 and 2014 FIVB Volleyball Women's World Championship.

== Personal life ==
In June 2016, Popović married basketball player Kamaldin Gamma. In January 2022, she gave birth to their daughter.
