= Estelle Quérard =

French volleyball player (born 1979)

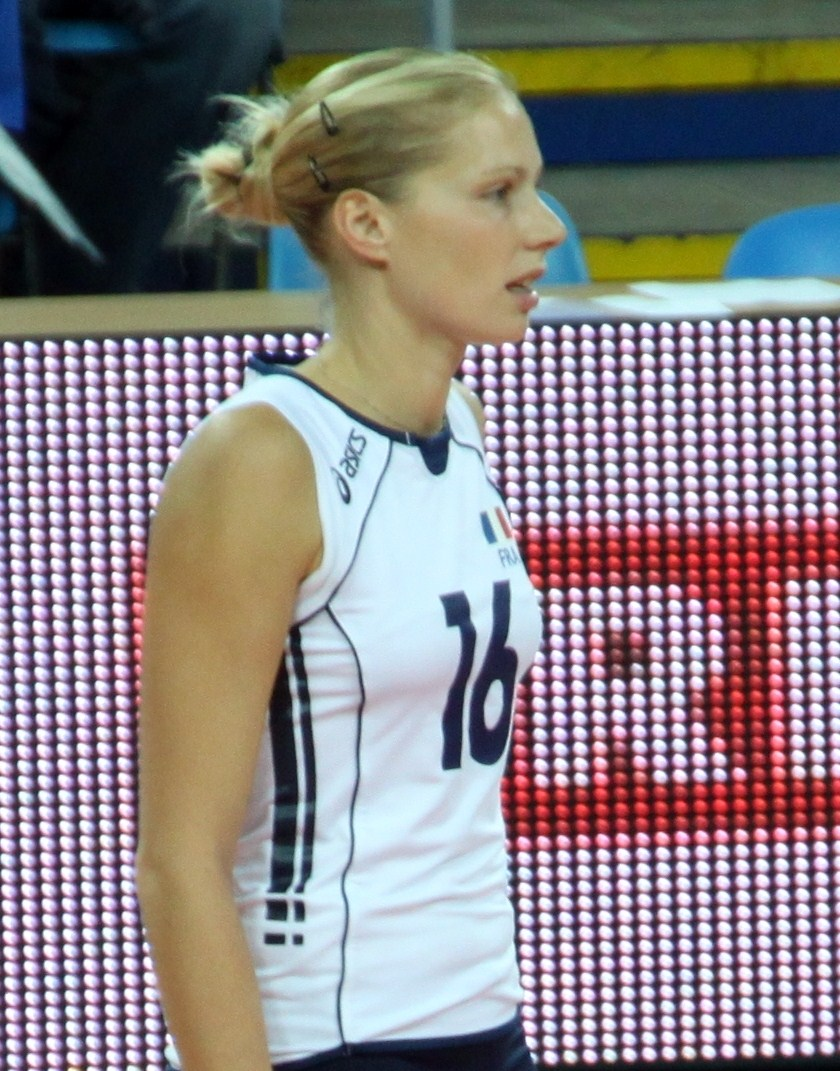

Personal information
- Nationality: French
- Born: 19 March 1979 (age 47)

Volleyball information
- Position: Libero
- Number: 16 (national team)

Career
Years	Teams
2009	ES Le Cannet

National team
2009	France

Estelle Quérard (born 19 March 1979) is a French female former volleyball player, playing as a libero. She was part of the France women's national volleyball team.

She competed at the 2009 Women's European Volleyball Championship. On club level she played for ES Le Cannet in 2009.
