= Anna Rybaczewski =

French volleyball player (born 1982)

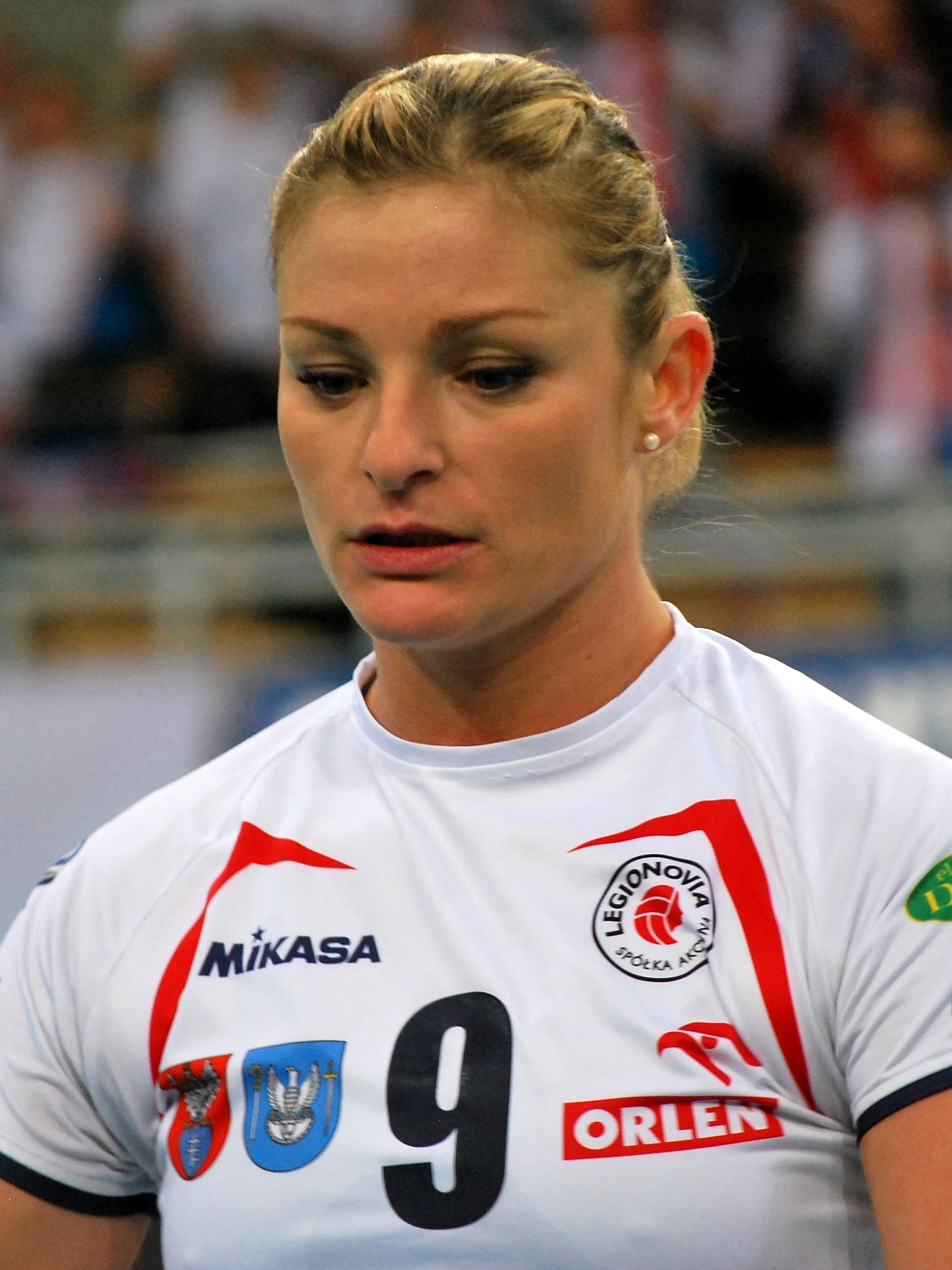
- Anna Rybaczewski 03 2014

Personal information
- Nationality: France / Polish
- Born: 23 March 1982 (age 44); Olsztyn, Poland
- Height: 186 cm (6 ft 1 in)
- Weight: 75 kg (165 lb)

Volleyball information
- Position: right side hitter
- Number: 9 (national team)

Career
Years	Teams
2013	ASPTT Mulhouse

National team
2013	France

Anna Rybaczewski (born 23 March 1982) is a French female former volleyball player, playing as a right side hitter. She was part of the France women's national volleyball team.

She competed at the 2013 Women's European Volleyball Championship. On club level she played for ASPTT Mulhouse.
