= 2008 FIVB Women's World Olympic Qualification Tournament squads =

This article shows all participating team squads at the 2008 FIVB Women's World Olympic Qualification Tournament, held from May 17 to May 25, 2008.

== Dominican Republic ==
- Head coach: Beato Miguel Cruz

#	Name	Date of Birth	Height	Weight	Spike	Block
1	Annerys Vargas	07.08.1981	194	70	325	315
3	Lisvel Elisa Eve	10.09.1991	189	70	250	287
4	Sidarka Núñez	25.06.1984	188	58	312	308
5	Brenda Castillo	05.06.1992	167	55	220	270
6	Carmen Rosa Caso	29.11.1981	168	59	243	241
8	Gina Del Rosario	12.05.1986	189	61	310	300
10	Milagros Cabral	17.10.1978	181	63	308	305
12	Karla Echenique	16.05.1986	181	62	279	273
13	Cindy Rondón	12.11.1988	189	61	312	305
14	Prisilla Rivera	29.12.1984	186	70	312	308
15	Cosiri Rodríguez (c)	30.08.1977	191	72	313	305
18	Bethania de la Cruz	13.05.1989	188	58	322	305

== Japan ==
- Head coach: Shoichi Yanagimoto

#	Name	Date of Birth	Height	Weight	Spike	Block
1	Megumi Kurihara	31.07.1984	186	69	305	285
2	Asako Tajimi	26.06.1972	180	70	309	304
3	Yoshie Takeshita (c)	18.03.1978	159	52	280	270
4	Kanako Omura	15.12.1976	184	70	319	310
5	Miyuki Takahashi	25.12.1978	170	65	290	285
6	Yuko Sano	26.07.1979	159	54	260	250
7	Sachiko Sugiyama	19.10.1979	184	66	310	305
8	Yuka Sakurai	02.09.1974	167	63	290	275
9	Miyuki Kano	17.05.1977	174	65	298	275
11	Erika Araki	03.08.1984	186	79	307	298
12	Saori Kimura	19.08.1986	184	66	298	293
14	Yuki Kawai	22.01.1990	168	63	280	275

== Kazakhstan ==
- Head coach: Viktor Zhuravlev

#	Name	Date of Birth	Height	Weight	Spike	Block
1	Natalya Zhukova	29.03.1980	184	70	305	285
2	Tatyana Pyurova	06.04.1982	182	67	305	295
4	Olga Karpova	10.06.1980	185	64	300	290
5	Yuliya Kutsko	18.04.1980	191	74	305	295
6	Olga Nassedkina	28.12.1982	191	75	305	295
8	Korinna Ishimtseva	08.02.1984	184	73	280	275
9	Xeniya Ilyuchshenko	29.05.1979	180	70	300	250
10	Yelena Ezau	09.03.1983	175	55	285	275
11	Olga Grushko	07.04.1976	180	70	305	295
13	Yelena Pavlova (c)	12.12.1978	184	70	315	290
16	Inna Matveyeva	12.10.1978	186	74	305	295
18	Sana Anarkulova	21.07.1989	187	70	300	290

== Poland ==
- Head coach: Marco Bonitta

#	Name	Date of Birth	Height	Weight	Spike	Block
1	Katarzyna Skowronska	30.06.1983	189	75	314	296
2	Mariola Zenik	03.07.1982	174	64	300	290
3	Eleonora Dziękiewicz	25.10.1978	185	75	307	295
5	Karolina Ciaszkiewicz	07.09.1979	183	73	303	290
6	Anna Podolec	30.10.1985	193	71	318	305
7	Malgorzata Glinka	30.09.1978	190	84	314	303
9	Agnieszka Bednarek	20.02.1986	185	70	309	292
11	Anna Baranska	14.05.1984	178	66	308	292
12	Milena Sadurek	18.10.1984	177	65	302	295
13	Milena Rosner (c)	04.01.1980	179	67	307	292
14	Maria Liktoras	20.02.1975	191	73	312	302
18	Katarzyna Skorupa	16.09.1984	182	69	302	296

== Puerto Rico ==
- Head coach: Juan Carlos Núñez

#	Name	Date of Birth	Height	Weight	Spike	Block
1	Deborah Seilhamer	10.04.1985	182	68	280	272
2	Xaimara Colón	11.09.1988	176	62	255	246
3	Vilmarie Mojica (c)	13.08.1985	177	63	295	274
5	Sarai Álvarez	03.04.1986	189	61	295	286
6	Michelle Cardona	05.09.1981	172	50	290	259
8	Eva Cruz	22.01.1974	182	72	305	290
9	Áurea Cruz	10.01.1982	182	63	310	290
11	Karina Ocasio	08.01.1985	192	76	298	288
12	Ania Ruiz	07.11.1982	182	68	305	284
15	Shanon Torregrosa	11.02.1981	182	68	307	287
17	Sheila Ocasio	17.11.1982	192	74	310	292
18	Jetzabel Del Valle	19.12.1979	185	73	305	292

== Serbia ==
- Head coach: Zoran Terzic

#	Name	Date of Birth	Height	Weight	Spike	Block
1	Jelena Nikolić	13.04.1982	194	75	315	300
2	Jovana Brakočević	05.03.1988	196	77	309	295
3	Ivana Djerisilo	08.08.1983	185	72	306	291
5	Nataša Krsmanović	19.06.1985	186	70	294	273
6	Sanja Tomasević	03.06.1980	185	73	295	290
9	Jovana Vesović	21.06.1987	182	68	283	268
10	Maja Ognjenović	06.08.1984	183	68	290	270
11	Vesna Čitaković (c)	03.02.1979	187	75	305	300
13	Maja Simanić	08.02.1980	180	70	280	270
16	Ivana Nesović	23.07.1988	190	75	296	281
17	Stefana Veljković	09.01.1990	190	76	320	305
18	Suzana Ćebić	09.11.1984	167	60	279	255

== South Korea ==
- Head coach: Lee Jung-Chul

#	Name	Date of Birth	Height	Weight	Spike	Block
1	Kim Min-Ji	25.05.1985	187	77	304	296
3	Han Soo-Ji	01.02.1989	182	78	305	296
4	Kim Sa-Nee (c)	21.06.1981	182	75	302	292
5	Kim Hae-Ran	16.03.1984	168	60	280	270
8	Chun Min-Chong	12.08.1985	180	67	300	287
9	La Hea-Won	28.06.1986	184	72	302	294
11	Han Yoo-Mi	05.02.1982	180	65	307	297
12	Lim Hyo-Sook	26.04.1982	177	75	278	270
14	Yang Hyo-Jin	14.12.1989	190	64	287	280
15	Kim Se-Young	04.06.1981	190	71	309	300
16	Bae Yoo-Na	30.11.1989	181	65	303	294
18	Kim Myung-Ok	05.05.1986	176	65	58	266

== Thailand ==
- Head coach: Nataphon Srisamutnak

#	Name	Date of Birth	Height	Weight	Spike	Block
1	Rattanaporn Sanuanram	09.04.1980	180	66	308	297
3	Saymai Paladsrichuay	04.08.1987	180	74	308	291
4	Siriporn Sooksen	09.02.1988	180	66	308	292
5	Pleumjit Thinkaow	09.11.1983	180	63	298	281
6	Onuma Sittirak	13.06.1986	175	72	304	285
7	Narumon Khanan	26.01.1983	180	66	311	289
10	Wilavan Apinyapong (c)	06.06.1984	174	68	294	282
11	Amporn Hyapha	19.05.1985	180	70	301	290
13	Nootsara Tomkom	07.07.1985	169	57	289	278
15	Malika Kanthong	08.01.1987	177	63	292	278
17	Wanna Buakaew	02.01.1981	172	54	292	277
19	Tapaphaipun Chaisri	29.11.1989	168	60	295	276
