= Volleyball at the 2006 Asian Games – Women's tournament =

Women at the 2006 Asian Games
- Venue: Al-Rayyan Indoor Hall
- Date: 30 November – 12 December 2006
- Competitors: 105 from 9 nations

Medalists
gold medal	China
silver medal	Japan
bronze medal	Chinese Taipei

The 2006 Women's Asian Games Volleyball Tournament was the 12th edition of the event, organized by the Asian governing body, the AVC in conjunction with the OCA. It was held in Doha, Qatar from November 30 to December 12, 2006.

== Squads ==
China	Chinese Taipei	Japan	Kazakhstan
Wang Yimei; Feng Kun; Yang Hao; Liu Yanan; Chu Jinling; Li Shan; Zhou Suhong; Li Juan; Song Nina; Zhang Na; Xu Yunli; Zhang Ping	Yeh Hui-hsuan; Lin Chun-yi; Chen Hui-chen; Chen Mei-ching; Kou Nai-han; Chiu Wen-ying; Chen Shu-li; Szu Hui-fang; Lin Ching-i; Tseng Hua-yu; Wu Hsiao-li; Juan Pei-chi	Yoshie Takeshita; Miyuki Takahashi; Kaoru Sugayama; Makiko Horai; Sachiko Sugiyama; Midori Takahashi; Erika Araki; Saori Kimura; Shuka Oyama; Mari Ochiai; Akiko Ino; Yuki Ishikawa	Natalya Rykova; Olga Karpova; Yuliya Kutsko; Olga Nassedkina; Olga Kubassevich; Korinna Ishimtseva; Xeniya Ilyuchshenko; Yelena Ezau; Olga Grushko; Yelena Pavlova; Inna Matveyeva; Xeniya Imangaliyeva
Mongolia	South Korea	Tajikistan	Thailand
Dashsambuugiin Altansubd; Davaajavyn Mönkhzayaa; Gansükhiin Ölziidelger; Demberelsambuugiin Anar; Galbadrakhyn Bilgüün; Enkhtaivany Erdenezayaa; Bayaagiin Sünjidmaa; Ganboldyn Tsetsegjargal; Amgalanbazaryn Uranchimeg; Batmagnaigiin Saruultuyaa; Ukhnaagiin Otgontuyaa	Kim Sa-nee; Nam Jie-youn; Han Yoo-mi; Kim Ji-hyun; Kim Yeon-koung; Han Soo-ji; Han Song-yi; Jung Dae-young; Hwang Youn-joo; Kim Se-young; Kim Hae-ran; Bae Yoo-na	Nigina Khorkasheva; Safina Zoalshoeva; Olga Maslova; Nisso Hamroeva; Azima Abdurahmonova; Ganjina Imronshoeva; Husnigul Mirzoqandova; Hadisa Bodurova; Nargis Homidova; Guzal Sattorova; Dilfuza Sodiqova	Rattanaporn Sanuanram; Konwika Apinyapong; Saymai Paladsrichuay; Pleumjit Thinkaow; Onuma Sittirak; Piyamas Koijapo; Wilavan Apinyapong; Amporn Hyapha; Nootsara Tomkom; Patcharee Sangmuang; Malika Kanthong; Wanna Buakaew
Vietnam			
Nguyễn Thị Minh; Phạm Thị Thúy; Phạm Thị Kim Huệ; Đặng Thị Hồng; Phạm Thị Yến; Trần Ngọc Diệp; Nguyễn Thị Ngọc Hoa; Nguyễn Thị Xuân; Lê Thị Mười; Đinh Thị Diệu Châu; Vũ Thị Liễu			

== Results ==
All times are Arabia Standard Time (UTC+03:00)

=== Preliminary ===
==== Pool A ====
Pos	Team	Pld	W	L	Pts	SPW	SPL	SPR	SW	SL	SR	Qualification
1	China	3	3	0	6	225	137	1.642	9	0	MAX	Quarterfinals
2	South Korea	3	2	1	5	230	222	1.036	6	5	1.200	Quarterfinals
3	Chinese Taipei	3	1	2	4	250	253	0.988	5	7	0.714	Quarterfinals
4	Vietnam	3	0	3	3	155	248	0.625	1	9	0.111	Quarterfinals

Source: Results

Date	Time		Score		Set 1	Set 2	Set 3	Set 4	Set 5	Total
30 Nov	12:00	China	3–0	Vietnam	25–18	25–9	25–10			75–37
30 Nov	14:00	South Korea	3–2	Chinese Taipei	21–25	20–25	25–23	25–19	15–9	106–101
03 Dec	10:00	Vietnam	1–3	Chinese Taipei	25–23	18–25	15–25	14–25		72–98
03 Dec	12:00	China	3–0	South Korea	25–15	25–15	25–19			75–49
06 Dec	12:00	South Korea	3–0	Vietnam	25–10	25–16	25–20			75–46
06 Dec	14:00	Chinese Taipei	0–3	China	17–25	17–25	17–25			51–75

==== Pool B ====
Pos	Team	Pld	W	L	Pts	SPW	SPL	SPR	SW	SL	SR	Qualification
1	Japan	4	4	0	8	333	205	1.624	12	2	6.000	Quarterfinals
2	Kazakhstan	4	3	1	7	337	249	1.353	11	4	2.750	Quarterfinals
3	Thailand	4	2	2	6	299	233	1.283	7	6	1.167	Quarterfinals
4	Mongolia	4	1	3	5	182	268	0.679	3	9	0.333	Quarterfinals
5	Tajikistan	4	0	4	4	104	300	0.347	0	12	0.000	

Source: Results

Date	Time		Score		Set 1	Set 2	Set 3	Set 4	Set 5	Total
30 Nov	18:00	Japan	3–0	Mongolia	25–10	25–17	25–9			75–36
30 Nov	20:00	Thailand	3–0	Tajikistan	25–7	25–7	25–4			75–18
02 Dec	10:00	Mongolia	0–3	Thailand	11–25	12–25	18–25			41–75
02 Dec	12:00	Kazakhstan	2–3	Japan	25–23	13–25	25–20	22–25	13–15	88–108
04 Dec	10:00	Thailand	1–3	Kazakhstan	22–25	26–24	21–25	15–25		84–99
04 Dec	12:00	Tajikistan	0–3	Mongolia	13–25	18–25	12–25			43–75
05 Dec	10:00	Kazakhstan	3–0	Tajikistan	25–7	25–10	25–10			75–27
05 Dec	12:00	Japan	3–0	Thailand	25–22	25–20	25–23			75–65
06 Dec	18:00	Tajikistan	0–3	Japan	5–25	5–25	6–25			16–75
06 Dec	20:00	Mongolia	0–3	Kazakhstan	4–25	15–25	11–25			30–75

=== Final round ===
Quarterfinals
8 December
China	3
Mongolia	0
8 December
Kazakhstan	2
Chinese Taipei	3
8 December
Japan	3
Vietnam	0
8 December
South Korea	1
Thailand	3

Semifinals
10 December
China	3
Chinese Taipei	0
10 December
Japan	3
Thailand	0

Gold medal match
12 December
China	3
Japan	1
Bronze medal match
12 December
Chinese Taipei	3
Thailand	0

Pos 5–8
10 December
Mongolia	0
Kazakhstan	3
10 December
Vietnam	0
South Korea	3

Pos 5–6
12 December
Kazakhstan	0
South Korea	3
Pos 7–8
12 December
Mongolia	0
Vietnam	3

==== Quarterfinals ====
Date	Time		Score		Set 1	Set 2	Set 3	Set 4	Set 5	Total
08 Dec	12:00	China	3–0	Mongolia	25–13	25–6	25–6			75–25
08 Dec	14:00	Japan	3–0	Vietnam	25–13	25–21	25–16			75–50
08 Dec	16:00	South Korea	1–3	Thailand	25–23	17–25	21–25	27–29		90–102
08 Dec	20:00	Kazakhstan	2–3	Chinese Taipei	19–25	25–22	25–22	29–31	13–15	111–115

==== Pos 5–8 ====
Date	Time		Score		Set 1	Set 2	Set 3	Set 4	Set 5	Total
10 Dec	12:00	Mongolia	0–3	Kazakhstan	13–25	8–25	15–25			36–75
10 Dec	14:00	Vietnam	0–3	South Korea	22–25	15–25	15–25			52–75

==== Semifinals ====
Date	Time		Score		Set 1	Set 2	Set 3	Set 4	Set 5	Total
10 Dec	18:00	China	3–0	Chinese Taipei	25–17	25–13	25–17			75–47
10 Dec	20:00	Japan	3–0	Thailand	32–30	25–17	25–17			82–64

==== Pos 7–8 ====
Date	Time		Score		Set 1	Set 2	Set 3	Set 4	Set 5	Total
12 Dec	12:00	Mongolia	0–3	Vietnam	11–15	16–25	19–25			46–75

==== Pos 5–6 ====
Date	Time		Score		Set 1	Set 2	Set 3	Set 4	Set 5	Total
12 Dec	14:00	Kazakhstan	0–3	South Korea	20–25	22–25	14–25			56–75

==== Bronze medal match ====
Date	Time		Score		Set 1	Set 2	Set 3	Set 4	Set 5	Total
12 Dec	18:00	Chinese Taipei	3–0	Thailand	25–23	25–21	25–14			75–58

==== Gold medal match ====
Date	Time		Score		Set 1	Set 2	Set 3	Set 4	Set 5	Total
12 Dec	20:00	China	3–1	Japan	22–25	25–10	25–23	25–16		97–74

== Final standing ==
Rank	Team	Pld	W	L
1st place, gold medalist(s)	China	6	6	0
2nd place, silver medalist(s)	Japan	7	6	1
3rd place, bronze medalist(s)	Chinese Taipei	6	3	3
4	Thailand	7	3	4
5	South Korea	6	4	2
6	Kazakhstan	7	4	3
7	Vietnam	6	1	5
8	Mongolia	7	1	6
9	Tajikistan	4	0	4
