= Volleyball at the 2002 Asian Games – Women's tournament =

Women at the 2002 Asian Games
- Venue: Gijang Gymnasium
- Date: 2–12 October 2002
- Competitors: 71 from 6 nations

Medalists
gold medal	China
silver medal	South Korea
bronze medal	Japan

The women's volleyball tournament at the 2002 Asian Games was held from Wednesday October 2 to Saturday October 12, 2002 in Busan, South Korea. The women's volleyball event was contested for the 11th time at the Asian Games.

== Squads ==
China	Chinese Taipei	Japan	Kazakhstan
Zhang Jing; Feng Kun; Yang Hao; Liu Yanan; Li Shan; Zhou Suhong; Zhao Ruirui; Zhang Yuehong; Chen Jing; Song Nina; Li Ying; Xiong Zi	Chen Shu-li; Teng Yen-min; Lin Ching-i; Liu Li-fang; Chen Mei-ching; Kou Nai-han; Szu Hui-fang; Chang Hui-min; Fan Hsin-wen; Lin Wen-yu; Liao Wan-ju; Wu Hsiao-li	Minako Onuki; Chikako Kumamae; Shinako Tanaka; Kana Oyama; Hisako Mukai; Sachiko Kodama; Miyuki Takahashi; Makiko Horai; Yuko Sano; Sachiko Sugiyama; Ai Otomo; Megumi Kawamura	Natalya Rykova; Alexandra Serebrennikova; Oxana Kim; Nadezhda Khojayeva; Irina Zaitseva; Yelena Pavlova; Xeniya Ilyuchshenko; Olga Grushko; Marina Kramarevskaya; Olga Nassedkina; Korinna Ishimtseva
South Korea	Thailand		
Kang Hye-mi; Ku Min-jung; Kim Sa-nee; Choi Kwang-hee; Park Mee-kyung; Koo Ki-lan; Chung Sun-hye; Lee Meong-hee; Kim Mi-jin; Chang So-yun; Jung Dae-young; Kim Nam-soon	Wanna Buakaew; Sommai Niyompon; Anna Paijinda; Nurak Nokputta; Pleumjit Thinkaow; Saranya Srisakorn; Suphap Phongthong; Piyamas Koijapo; Amporn Hyapha; Wanlapa Jid-ong; Patcharee Sangmuang; Wisuta Heebkaew		

== Results ==
All times are Korea Standard Time (UTC+09:00)

=== Preliminary round ===
Pos	Team	Pld	W	L	Pts	SW	SL	SR	SPW	SPL	SPR	Qualification
1	China	5	5	0	10	15	0	MAX	375	243	1.543	Final
2	South Korea	5	4	1	9	12	5	2.400	387	350	1.106	Final
3	Japan	5	3	2	8	9	6	1.500	336	306	1.098	
4	Chinese Taipei	5	2	3	7	8	10	0.800	383	407	0.941	
5	Thailand	5	1	4	6	3	13	0.231	321	393	0.817	
6	Kazakhstan	5	0	5	5	2	15	0.133	311	414	0.751	

Source: Results

Date	Time		Score		Set 1	Set 2	Set 3	Set 4	Set 5	Total
02 Oct	12:00	Japan	3–0	Chinese Taipei	25–20	25–16	28–26			78–62
02 Oct	14:00	Thailand	0–3	South Korea	14–25	21–25	13–25			48–75
03 Oct	10:00	China	3–0	Kazakhstan	25–9	25–19	25–12			75–40
04 Oct	10:00	Chinese Taipei	0–3	China	20–25	18–25	15–25			53–75
04 Oct	14:00	South Korea	3–0	Kazakhstan	25–23	25–23	25–20			75–66
05 Oct	10:00	Thailand	0–3	Japan	21–25	18–25	16–25			55–75
06 Oct	14:00	China	3–0	Thailand	25–17	25–20	25–17			75–54
06 Oct	16:00	Japan	0–3	South Korea	19–25	20–25	22–25			61–75
07 Oct	10:00	Kazakhstan	1–3	Chinese Taipei	25–15	16–25	14–25	21–25		76–90
07 Oct	12:00	Japan	0–3	China	18–25	11–25	18–25			47–75
08 Oct	12:00	Thailand	3–1	Kazakhstan	25–19	30–28	19–25	25–18		99–90
08 Oct	14:00	South Korea	3–2	Chinese Taipei	27–29	20–25	26–24	25–15	15–7	113–100
10 Oct	16:00	China	3–0	South Korea	25–19	25–15	25–15			75–49
11 Oct	10:00	Kazakhstan	0–3	Japan	10–25	14–25	15–25			39–75
11 Oct	12:00	Chinese Taipei	3–0	Thailand	28–26	25–22	25–17			78–65

=== Final ===
Date	Time		Score		Set 1	Set 2	Set 3	Set 4	Set 5	Total
12 Oct	16:00	South Korea	1–3	China	12–25	16–25	25–22	19–25		72–97

== Final standing ==
Rank	Team	Pld	W	L
1st place, gold medalist(s)	China	6	6	0
2nd place, silver medalist(s)	South Korea	6	4	2
3rd place, bronze medalist(s)	Japan	5	3	2
4	Chinese Taipei	5	2	3
5	Thailand	5	1	4
6	Kazakhstan	5	0	5
