= 2005 FIVB Women's World Grand Champions Cup squads =

This article shows all participating team squads at the 2005 FIVB Women's World Grand Champions Cup, held from November 15 to November 20, 2005 in Japan.

== Brazil ==
The following is the Brazil roster in the 2005 FIVB Women's World Grand Champions Cup.

#	Name	Date of Birth	Height	Weight	Spike	Block	Club
1	Fabiana Claudino	24 January 1985	76 cm (2 ft 6 in)	193 kg (425 lb)	314 cm (10 ft 4 in)	293 cm (9 ft 7 in)	SESI - SP
2	Carolina Albuquerque	25 July 1977	76 cm (2 ft 6 in)	182 kg (401 lb)	289 cm (9 ft 6 in)	279 cm (9 ft 2 in)	SESI - SP
3	Natalia Pereira	4 April 1989	76 cm (2 ft 6 in)	183 kg (403 lb)	300 cm (9 ft 10 in)	288 cm (9 ft 5 in)	Rexona-Ades
5	Caroline Gattaz	27 July 1981	87 cm (2 ft 10 in)	191 kg (421 lb)	304 cm (10 ft 0 in)	280 cm (9 ft 2 in)	UNILEVER
6	Fernanda Alves	29 June 1985	74 cm (2 ft 5 in)	189 kg (417 lb)	303 cm (9 ft 11 in)	287 cm (9 ft 5 in)	Brasil Telecom
8	Valeska Menezes	23 April 1976	62 cm (2 ft 0 in)	180 kg (400 lb)	302 cm (9 ft 11 in)	290 cm (9 ft 6 in)	Unilever Volei
10	Welissa Gonzaga	9 September 1982	76 cm (2 ft 6 in)	179 kg (395 lb)	300 cm (9 ft 10 in)	287 cm (9 ft 5 in)	Dentil Praia Clube
11	Marcelle Moraes	17 October 1976	72 cm (2 ft 4 in)	181 kg (399 lb)	303 cm (9 ft 11 in)	289 cm (9 ft 6 in)	Giannino Pallavolo Voley
12	Jaqueline Pereira De Carvalho Endres	31 December 1983	70 cm (2 ft 4 in)	186 kg (410 lb)	302 cm (9 ft 11 in)	286 cm (9 ft 5 in)	Minas Tênis Clube
13	Sheilla Castro De Paula Blassioli	1 July 1983	64 cm (2 ft 1 in)	185 kg (408 lb)	302 cm (9 ft 11 in)	284 cm (9 ft 4 in)	Vakifbank
14	Fabiana Oliveira	7 March 1980	59 cm (1 ft 11 in)	169 kg (373 lb)	276 cm (9 ft 1 in)	266 cm (8 ft 9 in)	Unilever Volei
17	Renata Colombo	25 February 1981	78 cm (2 ft 7 in)	181 kg (399 lb)	305 cm (10 ft 0 in)	293 cm (9 ft 7 in)	Rexona/Ades

== China ==
The following is the China roster in the 2005 FIVB Women's World Grand Champions Cup.

#	Name	Date of Birth	Height	Weight	Spike	Block	Club
1	Wang Yimei	11 January 1988	87 cm (2 ft 10 in)	190 kg (420 lb)	318 cm (10 ft 5 in)	305 cm (10 ft 0 in)	Liaoning
2	Feng Kun	28 December 1978	75 cm (2 ft 6 in)	183 kg (403 lb)	319 cm (10 ft 6 in)	310 cm (10 ft 2 in)	Beijing,
3	Yang Hao	21 March 1980	78 cm (2 ft 7 in)	182 kg (401 lb)	319 cm (10 ft 6 in)	314 cm (10 ft 4 in)	Liaoning
4	Liu Yanan	29 September 1980	73 cm (2 ft 5 in)	186 kg (410 lb)	320 cm (10 ft 6 in)	313 cm (10 ft 3 in)	Liaoning
5	Chu Jinling	29 July 1984	72 cm (2 ft 4 in)	190 kg (420 lb)	310 cm (10 ft 2 in)	302 cm (9 ft 11 in)	Liaoning, CHN
7	Zhou Suhong	23 April 1979	73 cm (2 ft 5 in)	182 kg (401 lb)	310 cm (10 ft 2 in)	300 cm (9 ft 10 in)	Zhejiang, CHN
10	Xue Ming	23 February 1987	72 cm (2 ft 4 in)	193 kg (425 lb)	324 cm (10 ft 8 in)	315 cm (10 ft 4 in)	Beijing
11	Li Juan	15 May 1981	72 cm (2 ft 4 in)	187 kg (412 lb)	315 cm (10 ft 4 in)	305 cm (10 ft 0 in)	Tianjin
12	Song Nina	7 April 1980	65 cm (2 ft 2 in)	179 kg (395 lb)	303 cm (9 ft 11 in)	293 cm (9 ft 7 in)	Army
15	Ma Yunwen	19 October 1986	76 cm (2 ft 6 in)	190 kg (420 lb)	315 cm (10 ft 4 in)	307 cm (10 ft 1 in)	Shanghai
16	Zhang Na	19 April 1980	72 cm (2 ft 4 in)	180 kg (400 lb)	302 cm (9 ft 11 in)	292 cm (9 ft 7 in)	Tianjin
18	Zhang Ping	23 March 1982	73 cm (2 ft 5 in)	187 kg (412 lb)	312 cm (10 ft 3 in)	301 cm (9 ft 11 in)	Tianjin

== Japan ==
The following is the Japan roster in the 2005 FIVB Women's World Grand Champions Cup.

#	Name	Date of Birth	Height	Weight	Spike	Block	Club
6	Kaoru Sugayama	26 December 1978	57 cm (1 ft 10 in)	169 kg (373 lb)	293 cm (9 ft 7 in)	269 cm (8 ft 10 in)	JT Marvelous
7	Makiko Horai	6 January 1979	68 cm (2 ft 3 in)	187 kg (412 lb)	312 cm (10 ft 3 in)	300 cm (9 ft 10 in)	JT Marvelous
8	Ayako Onuma	17 April 1979	72 cm (2 ft 4 in)	180 kg (400 lb)	302 cm (9 ft 11 in)	297 cm (9 ft 9 in)	Hitachi Sawa Rivale
11	Megumi Itabashi	7 June 1973	60 cm (2 ft 0 in)	166 kg (366 lb)	281 cm (9 ft 3 in)	272 cm (8 ft 11 in)	Hitachi Sawa Rivale
12	Ai Yamamoto	24 March 1982	68 cm (2 ft 3 in)	184 kg (406 lb)	312 cm (10 ft 3 in)	305 cm (10 ft 0 in)	JT Marvelous
14	Chie Yoshizawa	9 July 1983	66 cm (2 ft 2 in)	172 kg (379 lb)	294 cm (9 ft 8 in)	288 cm (9 ft 5 in)	JT Marvelous

== Poland ==
The following is the Poland roster in the 2005 FIVB Women's World Grand Champions Cup.

#	Name	Date of Birth	Height	Weight	Spike	Block	Club
1	Katarzyna Skowronska-Dolata	30 June 1983	75 cm (2 ft 6 in)	189 kg (417 lb)	314 cm (10 ft 4 in)	296 cm (9 ft 9 in)	Rabita Baku
2	Mariola Zenik	3 July 1982	65 cm (2 ft 2 in)	175 kg (386 lb)	300 cm (9 ft 10 in)	295 cm (9 ft 8 in)	Bank BPS Muszynianka
4	Izabela Belcik	29 November 1980	65 cm (2 ft 2 in)	185 kg (408 lb)	304 cm (10 ft 0 in)	292 cm (9 ft 7 in)	Atom Trefl
5	Magdalena Sliwa	17 November 1969	66 cm (2 ft 2 in)	173 kg (381 lb)	277 cm (9 ft 1 in)	268 cm (8 ft 10 in)	Wisla
7	Malgorzata Glinka-Mogentale	30 September 1978	84 cm (2 ft 9 in)	190 kg (420 lb)	314 cm (10 ft 4 in)	303 cm (9 ft 11 in)	VakifBank Ttelekom Istanbul
8	Dorota Swieniewicz	27 July 1972	64 cm (2 ft 1 in)	180 kg (400 lb)	315 cm (10 ft 4 in)	305 cm (10 ft 0 in)	Santeramo Sport
9	Agata Mroz	7 April 1982	74 cm (2 ft 5 in)	191 kg (421 lb)	312 cm (10 ft 3 in)	301 cm (9 ft 11 in)	Murcia
10	Joanna Mirek	17 February 1977	69 cm (2 ft 3 in)	187 kg (412 lb)	314 cm (10 ft 4 in)	306 cm (10 ft 0 in)	Muszynianka
11	Sylwia Pycia	20 April 1981	75 cm (2 ft 6 in)	190 kg (420 lb)	309 cm (10 ft 2 in)	302 cm (9 ft 11 in)	Pronar Zeta
12	Natalia Bamber-Laskowska	24 February 1982	66 cm (2 ft 2 in)	187 kg (412 lb)	311 cm (10 ft 2 in)	288 cm (9 ft 5 in)	BKS Aluprof
13	Milena Rosner	4 January 1980	67 cm (2 ft 2 in)	179 kg (395 lb)	307 cm (10 ft 1 in)	292 cm (9 ft 7 in)	Foppapedretti
18	Izabela Kowalinska	23 February 1985	77 cm (2 ft 6 in)	186 kg (410 lb)	300 cm (9 ft 10 in)	283 cm (9 ft 3 in)	KPS Chemik

== South Korea ==
The following is the South Korea roster in the 2005 FIVB Women's World Grand Champions Cup.

#	Name	Date of Birth	Height	Weight	Spike	Block	Club
1	Kim Min-Ji	25 May 1985	75 cm (2 ft 6 in)	187 kg (412 lb)	304 cm (10 ft 0 in)	296 cm (9 ft 9 in)	GS Caltex
3	Kim Yeon-Koung	26 February 1988	73 cm (2 ft 5 in)	192 kg (423 lb)	307 cm (10 ft 1 in)	299 cm (9 ft 10 in)	FENERBAHCE
4	Ji Jung-Hee	18 March 1985	65 cm (2 ft 2 in)	180 kg (400 lb)	305 cm (10 ft 0 in)	296 cm (9 ft 9 in)	KT&G
5	Lee Hyo-Hee	9 September 1980	60 cm (2 ft 0 in)	173 kg (381 lb)	280 cm (9 ft 2 in)	271 cm (8 ft 11 in)	Korea Expressway Corporation
6	Choi Kwang-Hee	25 May 1974	73 cm (2 ft 5 in)	173 kg (381 lb)	304 cm (10 ft 0 in)	289 cm (9 ft 6 in)	KT&G Corp.
7	Pak Sun-Mi	3 February 1982	64 cm (2 ft 1 in)	176 kg (388 lb)	275 cm (9 ft 0 in)	268 cm (8 ft 10 in)	Hyundai
8	Hwang Youn-Joo	13 August 1986	68 cm (2 ft 3 in)	177 kg (390 lb)	303 cm (9 ft 11 in)	294 cm (9 ft 8 in)	Hyundai Construction
10	Lee So-La	1 September 1987	62 cm (2 ft 0 in)	177 kg (390 lb)	295 cm (9 ft 8 in)	285 cm (9 ft 4 in)	Suwon City
13	Jung Dae-Young	12 August 1981	71 cm (2 ft 4 in)	183 kg (403 lb)	303 cm (9 ft 11 in)	292 cm (9 ft 7 in)	GS Caltex
14	Han Song-Yi	5 September 1984	65 cm (2 ft 2 in)	186 kg (410 lb)	305 cm (10 ft 0 in)	298 cm (9 ft 9 in)	GS Caltex
15	Kim Se-Young	4 June 1981	73 cm (2 ft 5 in)	190 kg (420 lb)	309 cm (10 ft 2 in)	300 cm (9 ft 10 in)	Hyundai Construction
16	Koo Ki-Lan	10 March 1977	64 cm (2 ft 1 in)	170 kg (370 lb)	274 cm (9 ft 0 in)	264 cm (8 ft 8 in)	Hungkuk Life Insurance Co.

== United States ==
The following is the United States roster in the 2005 FIVB Women's World Grand Champions Cup.

#	Name	Date of Birth	Height	Weight	Spike	Block	Club
2	Danielle Scott-Arruda	1 October 1972	84 cm (2 ft 9 in)	188 kg (414 lb)	325 cm (10 ft 8 in)	302 cm (9 ft 11 in)	Praia Clube
3	Tayyiba Haneef-Park	23 March 1979	82 cm (2 ft 8 in)	200 kg (440 lb)	328 cm (10 ft 9 in)	312 cm (10 ft 3 in)	Igtisadchi Baku
6	Elisabeth Bachman	7 November 1978	86 cm (2 ft 10 in)	193 kg (425 lb)	311 cm (10 ft 2 in)	300 cm (9 ft 10 in)	USA National Team
8	Katherine Wilkins	10 May 1982	81 cm (2 ft 8 in)	193 kg (425 lb)	309 cm (10 ft 2 in)	299 cm (9 ft 10 in)	USA National Team
10	Therese Crawford	26 August 1976	64 cm (2 ft 1 in)	178 kg (392 lb)	312 cm (10 ft 3 in)	304 cm (10 ft 0 in)	USA National Team
11	Robyn Ah Mow-Santos	15 September 1975	67 cm (2 ft 2 in)	172 kg (379 lb)	291 cm (9 ft 7 in)	281 cm (9 ft 3 in)	VBC Volero Zurich
12	Nancy Metcalf	12 November 1978	73 cm (2 ft 5 in)	186 kg (410 lb)	314 cm (10 ft 4 in)	292 cm (9 ft 7 in)	Lokomotiv Baku
15	Nicole Davis	24 April 1982	73 cm (2 ft 5 in)	167 kg (368 lb)	284 cm (9 ft 4 in)	266 cm (8 ft 9 in)	E.S. Cannet Rocheville VB
17	Jennifer Tamas	23 November 1982	82 cm (2 ft 8 in)	191 kg (421 lb)	315 cm (10 ft 4 in)	301 cm (9 ft 11 in)	Azerrail Baku
