= Japan women's national volleyball team =

Women's national volleyball team representing Japan

Japan
- Nickname(s): Nippon (火の鳥NIPPON)
- Association: Japan Volleyball Association
- Confederation: AVC
- Head coach: (Turkey) Ferhat Akbaş
- FIVB ranking: 6 ▼1 (2 October 2026)

Uniforms
Home	Away	Third

Summer Olympics
- Appearances: 14 (First in 1964)
- Best result: (1964, 1976)

World Championship
- Appearances: 18 (First in 1960)
- Best result: (1962, 1967, 1974)
- www.jva.or.jp/en/senior_women/ (in English)
Honours
Event	1st	2nd	3rd
Olympic Games	2	2	2
Nations League	0	1	0
World Grand Prix	0	1	0
World Championship	3	3	1
World Cup	1	2	0
World Grand Champions Cup	0	0	3
Asian Games	5	5	4
Asian Championship	5	7	7
Asian Cup	1	1	0
Montreux Volley Masters	1	2	2
Total	18	24	19
Olympic Games
Gold medal – first place	1964 Tokyo	Team
Gold medal – first place	1976 Montreal	Team
Silver medal – second place	1968 Mexico City	Team
Silver medal – second place	1972 Munich	Team
Bronze medal – third place	1984 Los Angeles	Team
Bronze medal – third place	2012 London	Team
World Championship
Gold medal – first place	1962 Soviet Union	
Gold medal – first place	1967 Japan	
Gold medal – first place	1974 Mexico	
Silver medal – second place	1960 Brazil	
Silver medal – second place	1970 Bulgaria	
Silver medal – second place	1978 Soviet Union	
Bronze medal – third place	2010 Japan	
World Cup
Gold medal – first place	1977 Japan	
Silver medal – second place	1973 Japan	
Silver medal – second place	1981 Japan	
World Grand Champions Cup
Bronze medal – third place	2001 Japan	
Bronze medal – third place	2013 Japan	
World Grand Prix
Silver medal – second place	2014 Japan	
FIVB Women's Volleyball Nations League
Silver medal – second place	2024 Bangkok	Team
Asian Games
Gold medal – first place	1962 Jakarta	Team
Gold medal – first place	1966 Bangkok	Team
Gold medal – first place	1970 Bangkok	Team
Gold medal – first place	1974 Tehran	Team
Gold medal – first place	1978 Bangkok	Team
Silver medal – second place	1982 New Delhi	Team
Silver medal – second place	1986 Seoul	Team
Silver medal – second place	2006 Doha	Team
Silver medal – second place	2022 Hangzhou	Team
Silver medal – second place	2026 Aichi-Nagoya	Team
Bronze medal – third place	1990 Beijing	Team
Bronze medal – third place	1994 Hiroshima	Team
Bronze medal – third place	1998 Bangkok	Team
Bronze medal – third place	2002 Busan	Team
Asian Championship
Gold medal – first place	1975 Melbourne	
Gold medal – first place	1983 Fukuoka	
Gold medal – first place	2007 Suphanburi	
Gold medal – first place	2017 Manila	
Gold medal – first place	2019 Seoul	
Silver medal – second place	1979 Hong Kong	
Silver medal – second place	1987 Shanghai	
Silver medal – second place	1991 Bangkok	
Silver medal – second place	1993 Shanghai	
Silver medal – second place	2003 Ho Chi Minh City	
Silver medal – second place	2011 Taipei	
Silver medal – second place	2013 Nakhon Ratchasima	
Bronze medal – third place	1989 Hong Kong	
Bronze medal – third place	1995 Chiang Mai	
Bronze medal – third place	1997 Manila	
Bronze medal – third place	1999 Hong Kong	
Bronze medal – third place	2005 Taicang	
Bronze medal – third place	2009 Hanoi	
Bronze medal – third place	2023 Nakhon Ratchasima	
Bronze medal – third place	2026 Tianjin	
Asian Cup
Gold medal – first place	2022 Pasig	
Silver medal – second place	2018 Nakhon Ratchasima	
Montreux Volley Masters
Gold medal – first place	2011 Switzerland	
Silver medal – second place	2019 Switzerland	
Silver medal – second place	2015 Switzerland	
Bronze medal – third place	2001 Switzerland	
Bronze medal – third place	1989 Switzerland	
Universiade
Gold medal – first place	1967 Tokyo	
Gold medal – first place	1985 Kobe	
Silver medal – second place	2021 Sichuan	
Silver medal – second place	2017 Taipei	
Silver medal – second place	1995 Fukuoka	
Silver medal – second place	1995 Mexico City	
Silver medal – second place	1970 Tulin	
Bronze medal – third place	2019 Naples	
Bronze medal – third place	2015 Gwangju	
Bronze medal – third place	1997 Sicily	
Bronze medal – third place	1983 Edmonton	

The Japan women's national volleyball team (Hinotori Nippon, 火の鳥NIPPON), or All-Japan women's volleyball team, is currently ranked 7th in the world by FIVB. The head coach is Ferhat Akbaş.

One of their greatest successes was at the 1964 Summer Olympics in Tokyo, when they defeated the heavily favored Soviet Union on the way to the gold medal. Japan was qualified for the 2004 Summer Olympics by winning the Women's Olympic Qualifier that was held from 8 May to 16 May in Tokyo, Japan. In Athens, Greece the team took fifth place in the overall-rankings.

Finally after almost three decades of medal drought in the Olympics, Japan took home the bronze medal by defeating South Korea in the 2012 Summer Olympics.

== Medals ==
Event	Gold	Silver	Bronze	Total
Olympic Games	2	2	2	6
Nations League	0	1	0	1
World Championship	3	3	1	7
World Grand Prix	0	1	0	1
World Cup	1	2	0	3
World Grand Champions Cup	0	0	3	3
Asian Games	5	4	4	13
Asian Championship	5	7	7	19
Asian Cup	1	1	0	2
Eastern Asian Championship	6	0	4	10
Universiade	3	3	4	10
Montreux Volley Masters	1	2	2	5
Asian Cup	1	1	4	6
Universiade	2	5	4	11
Total	20	27	23	70

== History ==
=== 2012 London Olympics ===
Japan qualified for the 2012 Summer Olympics as the best Asian team in the 2012 FIVB Women's World Olympic Qualification Tournament. In the 2012 Olympics, Japan had been placed on Group A with Russian Federation, Italy, Dominican Republic, the host Great Britain and Algeria. Japan finished third in the Group. In the quarter-finals, Japan faced their old Asian rival China. Saori Kimura and Yukiko Ebata each scored 33 points in this thrilling game in which China were beaten by 3–2. It was their first win over China in 11 years as far as FIVB games are concerned. On 9 August 2012, the Japanese were outplayed by the defending champions Brazil in the semi-finals. On 11 August 2012, Japan beat South Korea 3–0 in the bronze medal match. It is the first Olympics' volleyball medal for the Japanese since the 1984 Summer Olympics. On 13 August 2012, Japan Women's Team was ranked 3rd in the world behind United States women's national volleyball team and Brazil women's national volleyball team.

=== 2020 Tokyo Olympics ===
Japan was the host nation for the 2020 Summer Olympics. The other teams in their group in Tokyo were Kenya, Serbia, Brazil, Korea and the Dominican Republic. Japan's opening match was on 25 July 2021 in Tokyo against Kenya. They beat Kenya in their first match in straight sets and lost against Serbia, Brazil, Korea and the Dominican Republic which caused them to miss the qualification for the quarterfinals.

=== Winner of 6 major world titles ===
Year	Games	Host	Runner-up	2nd Runner-up
1962 #	4th World Championship	USSR	(Soviet Union) USSR	Poland
1964 #	Tokyo Olympic Games	Japan	(Soviet Union) USSR	Poland
1967 #	5th World Championship	Japan	(United States) USA	South Korea
1974 &	7th World Championship	Mexico	(Soviet Union) USSR	South Korea
1976 &	Montreal Olympic Games	Canada	(Soviet Union) USSR	South Korea
1977 &	2nd World Cup	Japan	Cuba	South Korea

#, & – Twice 3 Straight Major titles in 1960s and 1970s

(World Women's Volleyball Championship, World Cup, Olympic Games)

== Results ==
=== International ===
==== Olympic Games ====
Gold Silver Bronze Fourth place

Olympic Games record
Year	Round	Position	GP	MW	ML	SW	SL
(Japan) 1964	Round robin	Gold	5	5	0	15	1
(Mexico) 1968	Round robin	Silver	7	6	1	19	3
(Germany) 1972	Final	Silver	5	4	1	14	3
(Canada) 1976	Final	Gold	5	5	0	15	0
(Soviet Union) 1980	Did not participate						
(United States) 1984	Semifinals	Bronze	5	4	1	12	5
(South Korea) 1988	Semifinals	Fourth place	5	2	3	10	12
(Spain) 1992	Quarterfinals	5th place	5	3	2	10	9
(United States) 1996	Group stage	9th place	5	1	4	3	12
(Australia) 2000	Did not qualify						
(Greece) 2004	Quarterfinals	5th place	6	2	4	6	13
(China) 2008	Quarterfinals	5th place	6	2	4	7	14
(United Kingdom) 2012	Semifinals	Bronze	8	5	3	17	11
(Brazil) 2016	Quarterfinals	5th place	6	2	4	7	12
(Japan) 2020	Group stage	10th place	5	1	4	6	12
(France) 2024	Group stage	9th place	3	1	2	4	6
Total	2 titles	14/16	76	43	33	145	113

==== World Championship ====
Champions Runners up Third place Fourth place

World Championship record
Year	Round	Position	GP	MW	ML	SW	SL
(Soviet Union) 1952	Did not compete						
(France) 1956	Did not compete						
(Brazil) 1960	Final places	Runners-up	7	6	1	19	5
(Soviet Union) 1962	Final places	Champions	9	9	0	27	1
(Japan) 1967	Round robin	Champions	3	3	0	9	0
(Bulgaria) 1970	Final places	Runners-up	9	8	1	25	5
(Mexico) 1974	Final places	Champions	11	11	0	33	2
(Soviet Union) 1978	Final	Runners-up	9	7	2	21	12
(Peru) 1982	Semifinals	Fourth place	9	6	3	20	9
(Czechoslovakia) 1986	5th–8th places	7th place	8	4	4	13	14
(China) 1990	5th–8th places	8th place	7	3	4	11	13
(Brazil) 1994	5th–8th places	7th place	7	4	3	14	11
(Japan) 1998	5th–8th places	8th place	8	4	4	14	12
(Germany) 2002	First round	13th place	5	2	3	8	10
(Japan) 2006	5th–8th places	6th place	11	7	4	23	18
(Japan) 2010	Semifinals	Third place	11	8	3	28	17
(Italy) 2014	Second round	7th place	9	5	4	21	17
(Japan) 2018	Third round	6th place	12	7	5	28	18
(Netherlands) (Poland) 2022	Quarterfinals	5th place	10	7	3	24	11
(Thailand) 2025	Semifinals	Fourth place	7	5	2	18	11
(Canada) (United States) 2027	Qualified						
(Philippines) 2029	To be determined						
Total	3 titles	18/22	152	106	46	356	186

==== World Cup ====
- 1973 – (silver) Silver Medal
- 1977 – (gold) Gold Medal
- 1981 – (silver) Silver Medal
- 1985 – 4th place
- 1989 – 4th place
- 1991 – 7th place
- 1995 – 6th place
- 1999 – 6th place
- 2003 – 5th place
- 2007 – 7th place
- 2011 – 4th place
- 2015 – 5th place
- 2019 – 5th place

==== World Grand Champions Cup ====
- 1993 – 4th place
- 1997 – 5th place
- 2001 – (bronze) Bronze Medal
- 2005 – 5th place
- 2009 – 4th place
- 2013 – (bronze) Bronze Medal
- 2017 – 5th place

==== FIVB World Grand Prix ====
- 1993 – 6th place
- 1994 – 4th place
- 1995 – 7th place
- 1996 – 8th place
- 1997 – 4th place
- 1998 – 7th place
- 1999 – 7th place
- 2000 – 8th place
- 2001 – 6th place
- 2002 – 5th place
- 2003 – 9th place
- 2004 – 9th place
- 2005 – 5th place
- 2006 – 6th place
- 2007 – 9th place
- 2008 – 6th place
- 2009 – 6th place
- 2010 – 5th place
- 2011 – 5th place
- 2012 – 9th place
- 2013 – 4th place
- 2014 – (silver) Silver Medal
- 2015 – 6th place
- 2016 – 9th place
- 2017 – 7th place

=== Nations League ===
Champions Runners up Third place Fourth place

Nations League record
Year	Round	Position	Pld	W	L	SW	SL	Squad
(China) 2018	Preliminary	10th	15	7	8	27	31	Squad
(China) 2019	Preliminary	9th	15	7	8	27	27	Squad
(Italy) 2021	Semifinals	Fourth place	17	12	5	37	24	Squad
(Turkey) 2022	Quarterfinals	7th place	13	8	5	31	19	Squad
(United States) 2023	Quarterfinals	7th place	13	7	6	28	23	Squad
(Thailand) 2024	Final	Runners-up	15	10	5	35	21	Squad
(Poland) 2025	Semifinals	Fourth place	15	10	5	36	20	Squad
(Macau) 2026	Quarterfinals	7th place	13	8	5	28	24	Squad
(N/A) 2027	qualified							
Total	0 Titles	9/9	116	69	47	249	189	—

==== Montreux Volley Masters ====
- 1989 – Bronze Medal
- 2001 – Bronze Medal
- 2005 – 4th place
- 2009 – 7th place
- 2010 – 7th place
- 2011 – Gold Medal
- 2013 – 5th place
- 2014 – 6th place
- 2015 – Silver Medal
- 2019 – Silver Medal

=== Continental ===
==== Asian Games ====
- 1962 – Gold Medal
- 1966 – Gold Medal
- 1970 – Gold Medal
- 1974 – Gold Medal
- 1978 – Gold Medal
- 1982 – Silver Medal
- 1986 – Silver Medal
- 1990 – Bronze Medal
- 1994 – Bronze Medal
- 1998 – Bronze Medal
- 2002 – Bronze Medal
- 2006 – Silver Medal
- 2010 – 6th place
- 2014 – 4th place
- 2018 – 4th place
- 2022 – Silver Medal
- 2026 – Silver Medal

==== Asian Championship ====
- 1975 – (gold) Gold Medal
- 1979 – (silver) Silver Medal
- 1983 – (gold) Gold Medal
- 1987 – (silver) Silver Medal
- 1989 – (bronze) Bronze Medal
- 1991 – (silver) Silver Medal
- 1993 – (silver) Silver Medal
- 1995 – (bronze) Bronze Medal
- 1997 – (bronze) Bronze Medal
- 1999 – (bronze) Bronze Medal
- 2001 – 4th place
- 2003 – (silver) Silver Medal
- 2005 – (bronze) Bronze Medal
- 2007 – (gold) Gold Medal
- 2009 – (bronze) Bronze Medal
- 2011 – (silver) Silver Medal
- 2013 – (silver) Silver Medal
- 2015 – 6th place
- 2017 – (gold) Gold Medal
- 2019 – (gold) Gold Medal
- 2021 – Cancelled due to COVID-19 pandemic
- 2023 – (bronze) Bronze Medal
- 2026 – (bronze) Bronze Medal

==== Asian Cup ====
- 2008 — 4th place
- 2010 — 4th place
- 2012 — 5th place
- 2014 — 4th place
- 2016 — 4th place
- 2018 — (silver) Silver Medal
- 2022 — (gold) Gold Medal

== 2026 Results and fixtures ==
#	Opponent	Date	Result	Host city	Tournament
1	France	3 Jun	3–1 (23–25, 25–12, 25–22, 25–13)	(Canada) Quebec City	2026 Nations League
2	Ukraine	5 Jun	3–1 (25–20, 16–25, 25–16, 25–20)	(Canada) Quebec City	2026 Nations League
3	Germany	6 Jun	3–0 (25–20, 25–15, 26–24)	(Canada) Quebec City	2026 Nations League
4	Canada	7 Jun	3–2 (29–27, 25–20, 23–25, 28–30, 15–12)	(Canada) Quebec City	2026 Nations League
5	Serbia	17 Jun	3–2 (20–25, 26–24, 18–25, 32–30, 15–7)	(Philippines) Pasig	2026 Nations League
6	Czech Republic	19 Jun	3–0 (25–15, 25–23, 27–25)	(Philippines) Pasig	2026 Nations League
7	Dominican Republic	20 Jun	1–3 (25–17, 20–25, 26–28, 23–25)	(Philippines) Pasig	2026 Nations League
8	Italy	21 Jun	0–3 (21–25, 23–25, 18–25)	(Philippines) Pasig	2026 Nations League
9	Brazil	8 Jul	1–3 (20–25, 25–19, 19–25, 23–25)	(Japan) Osaka	2026 Nations League
10	Thailand	9 Jul	3–1 (25–15, 25–21, 22–25, 25–22)	(Japan) Osaka	2026 Nations League
11	Turkey	11 Jul	1–3 (22–25, 25–22, 22–25, 22–25)	(Japan) Osaka	2026 Nations League
12	Poland	12 Jul	3–2 (20–25, 14–25, 25–19, 25–21, 15–13)	(Japan) Osaka	2026 Nations League
13	Brazil	22 Jul	1–3 (26–24, 22–25, 16–25, 20–25)	Macau	2026 Nations League
14	Hong Kong	21 Aug	3–0 (25–9, 25–15, 25–12)	(China) Tianjin	2026 AVC Women's Volleyball Continental Championship
15	South Korea	23 Aug	3–0 (33–31, 25–19, 25–20)	(China) Tianjin	2026 AVC Women's Volleyball Continental Championship
16	Vietnam	25 Aug	3–0 (25–23, 25–17, 25–21)	(China) Tianjin	2026 AVC Women's Volleyball Continental Championship
17	Chinese Taipei	27 Aug	3–0 (25–14, 25–21, 25–13)	(China) Tianjin	2026 AVC Women's Volleyball Continental Championship
18	Thailand	29 Aug	1–3 (21–25, 20–25, 25–20, 20–25)	(China) Tianjin	2026 AVC Women's Volleyball Continental Championship
19	Iran	30 Aug	3–0 (25–21, 25–16, 26–24)	(China) Tianjin	2026 AVC Women's Volleyball Continental Championship
Head coach: (Turkey) Ferhat Akbaş

== Head-to-head record ==
This page shows Japan women's national volleyball team's Head-to-head record at the Volleyball at the Summer Olympics, FIVB Women's Volleyball Nations League.

Opponent	GP	MW	ML
Algeria	1	1	0
Argentina	2	2	0
Belgium	4	2	2
Brazil	14	1	13
Bulgaria	4	4	0
Cameroon	1	1	0
Canada	4	3	1
China	13	5	8
Croatia	1	1	0
Cuba	2	1	1
Czechoslovakia	2	2	0
Dominican Republic	8	6	2
East Germany	1	0	1
France	1	1	0
Germany	6	5	1
Great Britain	1	1	0
Greece	1	1	0
Hungary	1	1	0
Italy	7	2	5
Kenya	3	3	0
Mexico	1	1	0
Netherlands	7	2	5
North Korea	1	1	0
Peru	5	4	1
Poland	9	5	4
Romania	1	1	0
Russia	5	2	3
Serbia	7	3	4
South Korea	17	12	5
Soviet Union	6	3	3
Spain	1	1	0
Thailand	5	5	0
Turkey	7	4	3
Ukraine	1	1	0
United States	13	5	8
Venezuela	1	1	0
Total	164	94	70

== Team ==
=== Current squad ===
The following is the Japan roster in the 2025 FIVB Women's Volleyball Nations League

Head coach: (Turkey) Ferhat Akbaş

No.	Name	Date of birth	Position	Height
2	Ayaka Araki	2 September 2001 (age 25)	MB	185 cm (6 ft 1 in)
3	Haruyo Shimamura	4 March 1992 (age 34)	MB	182 cm (6 ft 0 in)
4	Mayu Ishikawa (c)	14 May 2000 (age 26)	OH	174 cm (5 ft 9 in)
6	Nanami Seki	12 June 1999 (age 27)	S	171 cm (5 ft 7 in)
8	Manami Kojima	7 November 1994 (age 32)	L	158 cm (5 ft 2 in)
11	Nichika Yamada	24 February 2000 (age 26)	MB	184 cm (6 ft 0 in)
12	Satomi Fukudome	23 November 1997 (age 28)	L	162 cm (5 ft 4 in)
1	Yukiko Wada	2 January 2002 (age 24)	OH	174 cm (5 ft 9 in)
15	Airi Miyabe	29 July 1998 (age 28)	MB	181 cm (5 ft 11 in)
9	Miiku Iwasawa	13 October 1999 (age 27)	OH	162 cm (5 ft 4 in)
10	Tsukasa Nakagawa	13 August 2000 (age 26)	S	159 cm (5 ft 3 in)
5	Yoshino Sato	12 November 2001 (age 25)	OH	178 cm (5 ft 10 in)
22	Ayane Kitamado	6 July 2004 (age 22)	OH	183 cm (6 ft 0 in)
26	Miku Akimoto	18 August 2006 (age 20)	OH	185 cm (6 ft 1 in)

=== Former squads ===
- 1994 squad:

Head coach: Tadayoshi Yokota

No.	Name	Date of birth	Height	1994 club
1	Motoko Obayashi	15.06.67	182 cm (5 ft 11 1/2 in)	Hitachi
2	Aki Nagatomi	17.07.69	173 cm (5 ft 8 in)	Hitachi
3	Chie Natori	09.08.69	176 cm (5 ft 9 1/2 in)	Daiei
4	Mika Yamauchi	07.10.69	182 cm (5 ft 11 1/2 in)	Daiei
6	Tomoko Yoshihara	04.02.70	179 cm (5 ft 10 1/2 in)	Hitachi
7	Kiyoko Fukuda	04.08.70	178 cm (5 ft 10 in)	Hitachi
8	Miho Murata	03.09.70	178 cm (5 ft 10 in)	Hitachi
9	Asako Tajimi	26.02.72	179 cm (5 ft 10 1/2 in)	Hitachi
12	Yumi Natta	12.07.69	161 cm (5 ft 3 1/2 in)	Daiei
13	Naomi Eto	12.07.72	186 cm (6 ft 1 in)	Hitachi
16	Maki Fujiyoshi	24.05.74	178 cm (5 ft 10 in)	Hitachi
17	Miyuki Shimasaki	13.10.74	178 cm (5 ft 10 in)	Hitachi
5	Kazuyo Matsukawa	07.01.70	181 cm (5 ft 11 1/2 in)	Daiei
10	Kumiko Sakamoto	13.12.72	177 cm (5 ft 9 1/2 in)	Daiei
14	Minako Onuki	15.10.72	173 cm (5 ft 8 in)	NEC
15	Miho Ota	27.10.73	179 cm (5 ft 10 1/2 in)	Hitachi
18	Eiko Yasui	08.05.71	164 cm (5 ft 4 1/2 in)	Kanagawa

- 1996 Olympic Games — 9th place (tied)
  Kaiyo Hoshini, Aki Nagatomi, Kazumi Nakamura, Chieko Nakanishi, Motoko Obayashi, Ikumi Ogake, Mika Saiki, Kiyomi Sakamoto, Asako Tajimi, Chiho Torii, Mika Yamauchi, and Tomoko Yoshihara. Head coach: Kuniaki Yoshida.
- 1999 FIVB World Cup — 6th place
  Naomi Eto, Megumi Itabashi, Chikako Kumamae, Hitomi Mitsunaga, Junko Moriyama, Ikumi Ogake, Minako Onuki, Yuka Sakurai, Miki Sasaki, Hiromi Suzuki, Asako Tajimi, and Hiroko Tsukumo. Head coach: Nobushika Kuzuwa.
- 2002 World Championship — 14th place
  Makiko Horai, Sachiko Kodama, Chikako Kumamae, Hisako Mukai, Kanako Naito, Minako Onuki, Ai Otomo, Kana Oyama, Yuko Sano, Sachiko Sugiyama, Miyuki Takahashi, and Shinako Tanaka. Head coach: Masahiro Yoshikawa.
- 2003 FIVB World Cup — 5th place
  Tomoko Yoshihara, Chie Tsuji, Miki Sasaki, Kanako Omura, Yoshie Takeshita, Miyuki Takahashi, Makiko Horai, Yuko Sano, Sachiko Sugiyama, Saori Kimura, Kana Oyama, and Megumi Kurihara. Head coach: Shoichi Yanagimoto.
- 2004 Olympic Qualification Tournament — 1st place (qualified)
  Tomoko Yoshihara, Chie Tsuji, Ikumi Narita, Miki Sasaki, Kanako Omura, Yoshie Takeshita, Miyuki Takahashi, Sachiko Sugiyama, Ai Otomo, Kana Oyama, Megumi Kurihara, and Saori Kimura. Head coach: Shoichi Yanagimoto.
- 2004 Olympic Games — 5th place (tied)
  Tomoko Yoshihara, Chie Tsuji, Ikumi Narita, Miki Sasaki, Kanako Omura, Yoshie Takeshita, Miyuki Takahashi, Sachiko Sugiyama, Ai Otomo, Kana Oyama, Megumi Kurihara, and Saori Kimura. Head coach: Shoichi Yanagimoto.
- 2005 FIVB World Grand Prix — 5th place
  Erika Araki, Makiko Horai, Megumi Itabashi, Ayako Onuma, Ai Otomo, Yuka Sakurai, Miki Shimada, Kaoru Sugayama, Sachiko Sugiyama, Yoshie Takeshita, Miyuki Takahashi, and Chie Yoshizawa. Head coach: Shoichi Yanagimoto.
- 2008 Olympic Qualification Tournament — 3rd place (qualified)
  Erika Araki, Miyuki Kano, Yuki Kawai, Saori Kimura, Megumi Kurihara, Kanako Omura, Yuka Sakurai, Yuko Sano, Miyuki Takahashi, Sachiko Sugiyama, Yoshie Takeshita, and Asako Tajimi. Head coach: Shoichi Yanagimoto.
- 2008 Olympic Games — 5th place (tied)
  Erika Araki, Miyuki Kano, Yuki Kawai, Saori Kimura, Megumi Kurihara, Kanako Omura, Yuka Sakurai, Yuko Sano, Miyuki Takahashi, Sachiko Sugiyama, Yoshie Takeshita, and Asako Tajimi. Head coach: Shoichi Yanagimoto.
- 2010 World Championship — 3rd place
  Megumi Kurihara, Hitomi Nakamichi, Yoshie Takeshita, Kaori Inoue, Ai Yamamoto, Yuko Sano, Mai Yamaguchi, Mizuho Ishida, Erika Araki, Saori Kimura, Yukiko Ebata, Saori Sakoda, Akiko Ino, and Kanari Hamaguchi, Head coach: Masayoshi Manabe.
- 2012 Olympic Games — Bronze Medal
  Erika Araki (c), Saori Kimura, Yoshie Takeshita, Yukiko Ebata, Kaori Inoue, Ai Otomo, Yuko Sano, Mai Yamaguchi, Risa Shinnabe, Saori Sakoda, Maiko Kano, and Hitomi Nakamichi, Head coach: Masayoshi Manabe.
- 2014 World Championship
  Saori Kimura (c), Miyu Nagaoka, Hitomi Nakamichi, Arisa Takada, Arisa Satō, Mai Yamaguchi, Mizuho Ishida, Yuki Ishii, Risa Shinnabe, Yukiko Ebata, Saori Sakoda, Kana Ōno, Sayaka Tsutsui, and Haruka Miyashita, Head coach: Masayoshi Manabe.
- 2016 Olympic Games — 5th place
  Saori Kimura (c), Miyu Nagaoka, Arisa Satō, Mai Yamaguchi, Yuki Ishii, Saori Sakoda, Haruka Miyashita, Kanami Tashiro, Erika Araki, Yurie Nabeya, Haruyo Shimamura and Kotoki Zayasu, Head coach: Masayoshi Manabe.
- 2018 World Championship — 6th Place
  Nana Iwasaka (c), Koyomi Tominaga, Kanami Tashiro, Erika Araki, Mai Okumura, Haruyo Shimamura, Risa Shinnabe, Yuki Ishii, Sarina Koga, Ai Kurogo, Mami Uchiseto, Miyu Nagaoka, Kotoe Inoue, Mako Kobata, Head coach: Kumi Nakada.
- 2020 Summer Olympics — 10th Place
  Erika Araki (c), Ai Kurogo, Sarina Koga, Kanami Tashiro, Mayu Ishikawa, Haruyo Shimamura, Mako Kobata, Yuki Ishii, Mai Okumura, Aki Momii, Kotona Hayashi and Nichika Yamada, Head coach: Kumi Nakada
- 2022 World Championship — 5th Place
  Sarina Koga (c), Mami Uchiseto, Mayu Ishikawa, Haruyo Shimamura, Arisa Inoue, Aki Momii, Kotona Hayashi, Nichika Yamada, Satomi Fukudome, Mami Yokota, Airi Miyabe, Nanami Seki, Ameze Miyabe and Yoshino Sato, Head coach: Masayoshi Manabe.
- 2024 Summer Olympics — 9th Place
  Sarina Koga (c), Koyomi Iwasaki, Kotona Hayashi, Mayu Ishikawa, Nanami Seki, Manami Kojima, Arisa Inoue, Nichika Yamada, Satomi Fukudome, Airi Miyabe, Ayaka Araki and Yukiko Wada, Head coach: Masayoshi Manabe
- 2025 World Championship — 4th Place
  Mayu Ishikawa (c), Ayaka Araki, Haruyo Shimamura, Nanami Seki, Manami Kojima, Nichika Yamada, Satomi Fukudome, Yukiko Wada, Airi Miyabe, Miiku Iwasawa, Tsukasa Nakagawa, Yoshino Sato, Ayane Kitamado and Miku Akimoto, Head coach: Ferhat Akbaş.

=== Coaches history ===
- (Japan) Tadayoshi Yokota
- (Japan) Kuniaki Yoshida
- (Japan) Nobushika Kuzuwa
- (Japan) Masahiro Yoshikawa
- (Japan) Shoichi Yanagimoto (2003–2008)
- (Japan) Masayoshi Manabe (2008–2016; 2021–2024)
- (Japan) Kumi Nakada (2016–2021)
- (Turkey) Ferhat Akbaş (2025–present)

== Gallery ==
1964 Tokyo Olympics Women's Volleyball
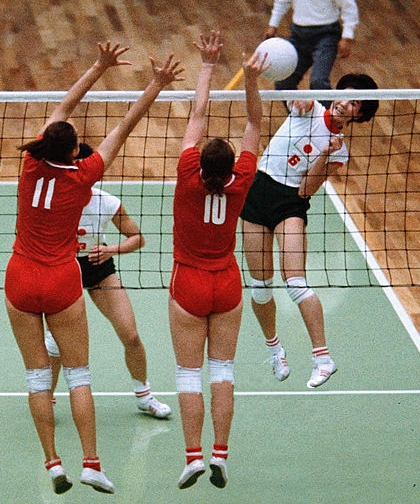
Sata Isobe spiking ball against Soviet Union National Team, 1964 Tokyo Olympics Women's Volleyball

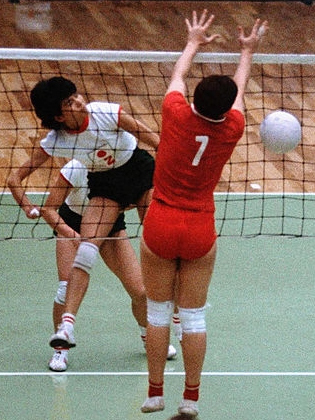
Emiko Miyamoto at the 1964 Olympics

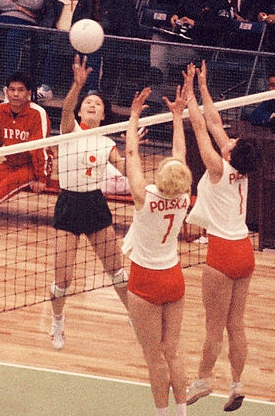
Yuriko Handa at the 1964 Olympics

== See also ==
- Japan women's national under-23 volleyball team
- Japan women's national under-20 volleyball team
- Japan women's national under-18 volleyball team
- Attack No. 1
- Japan men's national volleyball team
