= Volleyball at the 2006 Asian Games =

International sporting competition

- Venue: Al-Rayyan Indoor Hall
- Dates: 26 November – 14 December 2006
- Competitors: 332 from 21 nations

Indoor volleyball was contested at the 2006 Asian Games in Doha, Qatar. All matches played at the Al-Rayyan Indoor Hall.

== Schedule ==
Q	Qualification	P	Preliminary round	¼	Quarterfinals	½	Semifinals	F	Finals

Event↓/Date →	26th Sun	27th Mon	28th Tue	29th Wed	30th Thu	1st Fri	2nd Sat	3rd Sun	4th Mon	5th Tue	6th Wed	7th Thu	8th Fri	9th Sat	10th Sun	11th Mon	12th Tue	13th Wed	14th Thu
Men	Q	Q	Q				P	P	P	P		P		P		¼		½	F
Women					P		P	P	P	P	P		¼		½		F		

== Medalists ==
Event	Gold	Silver	Bronze
Men	South Korea; Shin Jin-sik; Kwon Young-min; Moon Sung-min; Yeo Oh-hyun; Song Byung-il; Lee Sun-kyu; Who In-jung; Yun Bong-woo; Lee Kyung-soo; Kim Yo-han; Ha Kyoung-min; Chang Byung-chul	China; Cui Xiaodong; Yuan Zhi; Guo Peng; Wang Haichuan; Tang Miao; Cui Jianjun; Li Chun; Yu Dawei; Shen Qiong; Jiang Fudong; Ren Qi; Sui Shengsheng	Saudi Arabia; Ahmed Al-Bakhit; Naif Al-Buhassoun; Yahya Hanash; Ibrahim Al-Harbi; Abdullah Al-Bahli; Sharif Al-Khalifa; Khalil Hajji; Thamer Al-Dossari; Khalid Ozaibi; Ismail Al-Khaibari; Masfer Al-Bishi; Yasser Al-Makawni
Women	China; Wang Yimei; Feng Kun; Yang Hao; Liu Yanan; Chu Jinling; Li Shan; Zhou Suhong; Li Juan; Song Nina; Zhang Na; Xu Yunli; Zhang Ping	Japan; Yoshie Takeshita; Miyuki Takahashi; Kaoru Sugayama; Makiko Horai; Sachiko Sugiyama; Midori Takahashi; Erika Araki; Saori Kimura; Shuka Oyama; Mari Ochiai; Akiko Ino; Yuki Ishikawa	Chinese Taipei; Yeh Hui-hsuan; Lin Chun-yi; Chen Hui-chen; Chen Mei-ching; Kou Nai-han; Chiu Wen-ying; Chen Shu-li; Szu Hui-fang; Lin Ching-i; Tseng Hua-yu; Wu Hsiao-li; Juan Pei-chi

== Medal table ==
Rank	Nation	Gold	Silver	Bronze	Total
1	China (CHN)	1	1	0	2
2	South Korea (KOR)	1	0	0	1
3	Japan (JPN)	0	1	0	1
4	Chinese Taipei (TPE)	0	0	1	1
4	Saudi Arabia (KSA)	0	0	1	1
Totals (5 entries)		2	2	2	6

== Draw ==
The draw ceremony for the team sports was held on 7 September 2006 at Doha.

=== Men ===
Due to scheduling conflicts with 2006 FIVB Volleyball Men's World Championship, China, Iran, Japan, Kazakhstan and South Korea alongside the host team Qatar qualified directly to the quarterfinal stage. The remaining teams were seeded based on their final ranking at the 2005 Asian Men's Volleyball Championship. India and Thailand, the next top two teams started the competition from the preliminary round.

Qualification – Pool A

- Bahrain (10)
- Lebanon
- Mongolia

Qualification – Pool B

- ~~Indonesia (11)~~*
- Saudi Arabia
- Macau

Qualification – Pool C

- Chinese Taipei (13)
- Kuwait
- Maldives

Qualification – Pool D

- United Arab Emirates (17)
- Hong Kong (18)
- Palestine
- ~~Turkmenistan~~*

* Withdrew.

Preliminary – Pool A

- India (4)
- 2nd Qualification – Pool A
- 1st Qualification – Pool B
- 2nd Qualification – Pool C
- 1st Qualification – Pool D

Preliminary – Pool B

- Thailand (5)
- 1st Qualification – Pool A
- 2nd Qualification – Pool B
- 1st Qualification – Pool C
- 2nd Qualification – Pool D

Quarterfinals

- Qatar (Host) vs. 1st Preliminary – Pool B
- Asia Rank 1 vs. 1st Preliminary – Pool A
- Asia Rank 2 vs. Asia Rank 5
- Asia Rank 3 vs. Asia Rank 4

The teams were seeded based on their performance at the 2006 FIVB Volleyball Men's World Championship.

Team	Rank	Pts	PR	
Japan	8			Asia Rank 1
China	17	7		Asia Rank 2
South Korea	17	6		Asia Rank 3
Iran	21	5	0.835	Asia Rank 4
Kazakhstan	21	5	0.832	Asia Rank 5

=== Women ===
The teams were seeded based on their final ranking at the 2005 Asian Women's Volleyball Championship.

Pool A

- China (1)
- South Korea (4)
- Chinese Taipei (5)
- Vietnam

Pool B

- Kazakhstan (2)
- Japan (3)
- Thailand (6)
- Tajikistan
- Mongolia

== Final standing ==
=== Men ===
Rank	Team	Pld	W	L
1st place, gold medalist(s)	South Korea	3	3	0
2nd place, silver medalist(s)	China	3	2	1
3rd place, bronze medalist(s)	Saudi Arabia	8	7	1
4	Qatar	3	1	2
5	Japan	3	2	1
6	Iran	3	1	2
7	Kazakhstan	3	1	2
8	Bahrain	9	6	3
9	Chinese Taipei	6	5	1
9	India	4	3	1
11	Kuwait	6	2	4
11	Thailand	4	2	2
13	Hong Kong	6	2	4
13	Lebanon	6	2	4
15	Macau	5	0	5
15	United Arab Emirates	6	3	3
17	Maldives	2	0	2
17	Mongolia	2	0	2
17	Palestine	2	0	2

=== Women ===
Rank	Team	Pld	W	L
1st place, gold medalist(s)	China	6	6	0
2nd place, silver medalist(s)	Japan	7	6	1
3rd place, bronze medalist(s)	Chinese Taipei	6	3	3
4	Thailand	7	3	4
5	South Korea	6	4	2
6	Kazakhstan	7	4	3
7	Vietnam	6	1	5
8	Mongolia	7	1	6
9	Tajikistan	4	0	4
