= Saori Kimura =

Japanese former volleyball player (born 1986)

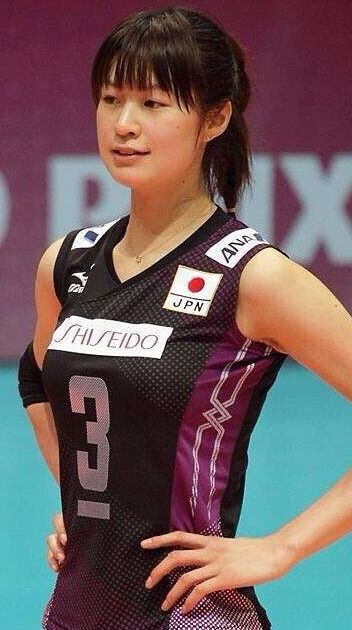
- Kimura in 2014

Personal information
- Full name: Saori Hidaka (after marriage)
- Nickname: Miracle Saorin
- Born: Saori Kimura; August 19, 1986 (age 40); Yashio, Saitama, Japan
- Height: 185 cm (6 ft 1 in)
- Weight: 65 kg (143 lb)
- Spike: 304 cm (120 in)
- Block: 293 cm (115 in)

Volleyball information
- Position: Wing-spiker
- Current club: Retired

Career
Years	Teams
2005–2012	Toray Arrows
2012–2013	VakıfBank
2013–2014	Galatasaray
2014–2017	Toray Arrows

National team
2003–2016	Japan
Medal record
Women's volleyball
Representing Japan
Olympic Games
Bronze medal – third place	2012 London	Team
World Championship
Bronze medal – third place	2010 Japan	Team
World Grand Champions Cup
Bronze medal – third place	2013 Japan	Team
World Grand Prix
Silver medal – second place	2014 Japan	Team
Asian Games
Silver medal – second place	2006 Doha	Team
Asian Championship
Gold medal – first place	2007 Suphanburi	Team
Bronze medal – third place	2009 Hanoi	Team
Silver medal – second place	2011 Taipei	Team
Silver medal – second place	2013 Nakhon Ratchasima	Team

Saori Kimura (木村 沙織, Kimura Saori; born August 19, 1986) is a retired Japanese volleyball player who played for Toray Arrows. She also played for the All-Japan women's volleyball team and was a captain of the team. She was a participant at the 2004 Summer Olympics, 2008 Summer Olympics, 2012 Summer Olympics and 2016 Summer Olympics, winning a bronze medal in 2012. She was so versatile that she could play any position.

On 10 July 2012, Toray announced that Kimura will move to VakıfBank Türk Telekom next season.

On 3 June 2013, Daikin (which is a sponsor of Galatasaray Daikin) announced that Kimura will move to Galatasaray Daikin next season.

On 5 June 2014, Toray Arrows announced Kimura would join the next season.

In 2017, Kimura announced her retirement.

== Early life ==
Kimura was born in Yashio City, Saitama Prefecture. Because of her father’s job, the family moved frequently between Osaka and Tokyo, before she eventually attended Tanishi Elementary School in Akiruno City. Influenced by her volleyball-playing parents (especially her mother), she began playing volleyball in the second grade when she joined Akikawa JVC, a local club. Akikawa JVC focused primarily on defensive training, where Kimura developed her receiving skills—something she later credited as the foundation of her strong defensive ability. She mainly played as a left hitter and, in sixth grade, helped her team win a championship. At one point, in fourth grade, she briefly quit the team for about two weeks because she “wanted to spend weekends playing freely with friends,” but apart from that short break, volleyball remained central to her life.

=== Junior High Years ===
Kimura went on to attend the prestigious Seitoku Gakuen Junior High School, where she met future national teammates such as Kana Oyama, Erika Araki, and Miki Oyama. At the time of her enrollment, she was 163 cm tall (5’4), but over the course of three years she grew about 15 cm (5’8). She began playing more often as a middle blocker and right hitter, becoming a key player on the team. She helped her school win the All Japan Junior High School Volleyball Championship, won the JOC Cup at the National Prefectural Junior High School Tournament (Aquarius Cup), and perfected her B quick attack, which became one of her signature plays.

In her second year of junior high, she suffered the first fracture of her volleyball career (the base of her left middle finger). Fortunately, it was minor, requiring only two weeks to heal.

=== High School Years, Debut on the World Stage ===
In 2002, she enrolled at Seitoku Gakuen High School (now Shimokitazawa Seitoku High School), a powerhouse school known for its excellent volleyball team. By her second year, she had become a key starter in the opposite hitter position. That same year, she helped lead the team to victory at the 2003 Spring High School Volleyball Tournament, securing Seitoku’s second consecutive championship title. In August, the team competed in the Inter-High School Championship, where they finished third, falling short of a repeat championship. However, immediately after the Inter-High ended, she was called up to the Japan women's national volleyball team training camp, and in September, she represented Japan at the Asian Women's Volleyball Championship although, she was initially registered as a setter. Later in November, she made her debut on the world stage at the 2003 FIVB Volleyball Women's World Cup, filling in for the injured Hiromi Suzuki.

In December, Shimokitazawa Seitoku achieved its third consecutive title at the All Japan Private High Schools Championship—a first in the tournament’s history. At the 2004 Spring High Tournament, the team aimed for a third straight crown, reaching the final. However, early in the first set, after scoring a spike, she collided with her teammate Yumika Yokoyama and twisted her right ankle. Despite receiving first aid and continuing to play while limping, the team ultimately lost 1–3 to Kyushu Bunka Gakuen, finishing as runners-up.

In 2004, she was called up again to the Japan national team for the final Olympic qualification tournament for the 2004 Summer Olympic Games in Athens. In the opening match against Italy, she made her first start for Japan, scoring 14 points. Her lively personality and innocent smile quickly won public attention, earning her the nickname “Super High School Girl.” She played a major role in helping Japan secure a spot at the Olympics for the first time in two tournaments.

That June, she competed in the Inter-High Kanto regional qualifiers, but her team was eliminated early. She then joined the national team’s European training camp, appearing in events such as the Italy Four Nations Tournament. From July, she also took part in the 2004 FIVB Volleyball World Grand Prix, which lasted a month, though Japan failed to advance past the preliminary round and she saw limited success.

By the time the Athens Olympics began on August 14, her physical condition had worsened—she was suffering from severe lower back pain, later diagnosed as a herniated disc by trainers from other sports while in Athens. As a result, she had very little playing time and ended her first Olympic experience largely from the sidelines. However, watching the final match between China and Russia live in the arena left a lasting impression on her; witnessing world-class play firsthand gave her, for the first time, a burning desire to win an Olympic medal.

After the Olympics, she represented Japan at the Asian Junior Championship in Sri Lanka. By December 2004, during her final high school tournament, the All Japan Private High Schools Championship, her back problems had significantly worsened. In the final match, she appeared late in the second set but was unable to score, marking a quiet end to her high school volleyball career.

== Clubs ==
Club	Country	Year
Shimokitazawa Seitoku Highschool	Japan	2002–2005
Toray Arrows	Japan	2005–2012
VakıfBank	Turkey	2012–2013
Galatasaray	Turkey	2013–2014
Toray Arrows	Japan	2014–2017

== Awards ==
=== Individuals ===
- The 12th Women's V.League - New Face Award (2005–06)
- 2007 14th Senior Asian Championship at Thailand - Best Server
- 2007-08 All Japan Championship 2008 - MVP
- 2007-08 Women's V.Premier League - Best 6
- 2008-09 Women's V.Premier League - Best 6
- 2009 58th Kurowashi Tournament - MVP
- 2009 15th Senior Asian Championship at Vietnam - Best Server
- 2009-10 Women's V.Premier League MVP, Best 6
- 2010 59th Kurowashiki Tournament MVP, Best6
- 2010 Piemonte Woman Cup Tournament - Best Server and MVP
- 2010 FIVB World Grand Prix "Best Scorer"
- 2010-11 Women's V.Premier League - Excellent player award
- 2011 60th Kurowashi Tournament - Best6
- 2011-12 Women's V.Premier League Best 6

=== Clubs ===
- 2007 Domestic Sports Festival (Volleyball) - Champion, with Toray Arrows.
- 2007-2008 Empress's Cup - Champion, with Toray Arrows.
- 2007-2008 V.Premier League - Champion, with Toray Arrows.
- 2008 Domestic Sports Festival - Runner-Up, with Toray Arrows.
- 2008-2009 V.Premier League - Champion, with Toray Arrows.
- 2009 Kurowashiki All Japan Volleyball Championship - Champion, with Toray Arrows.
- 2009-2010 V.Premier League - Champion, with Toray Arrows.
- 2010 Kurowashiki All Japan Volleyball Championship - Champion, with Toray Arrows.
- 2010-2011 Empress's Cup - Runner-Up, with Toray Arrows.
- 2010-2011 V.Premier League - Runner-Up, with Toray Arrows.
- 2011-2012 Empress's Cup - Champion, with Toray Arrows.
- 2011-2012 V.Premier League - Champion, with Toray Arrows.
- 2012-13 Turkish Cup - Champion, with Vakıfbank Spor Kulübü
- 2012–13 CEV Champions League - Champion, with Vakıfbank Spor Kulübü
- 2012-13 Turkish Women's Volleyball League - Champion, with Vakıfbank Spor Kulübü

== National team ==
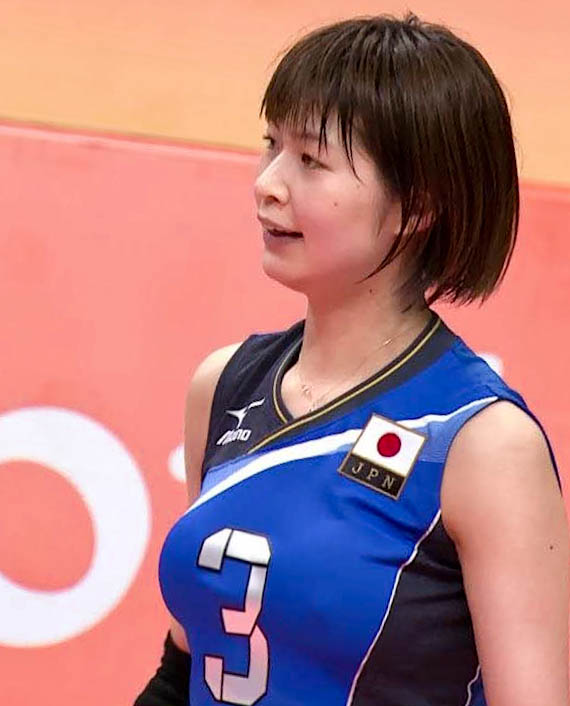
Saori Kimura at the 2016 Summer Olympics in Rio de Janeiro

=== Senior team ===
- 2003: 5th place in the World Cup in Japan
- 2004: 5th place in the Olympic Games of Athens in Greece
- 2005: Bronze Medal in the 13th Senior Asian Championship in China
- 2006: 6th place in the World Championship in Japan
- 2006: Silver Medal in Asian Games 2006 in Qatar
- 2007: Gold Medal in the 14th Senior Asian Championship in Thailand
- 2007: 7th place in the World Cup in Japan
- 2008: 6th place in the World Grand Prix Final round in Japan
- 2008: 5th place in the Olympic Games of Beijing in China
- 2009: 6th place in the World Grand Prix Final round in Japan
- 2009: Bronze Medal in the 15th Senior Asian Championship in Vietnam
- 2009: 4th place in the World Grand Champion Cup in Japan
- 2010: Gold Medal in Piemonte Woman Cup Tournament in Italy
- 2010: 5th place in the World Grand Prix Final round in China
- 2010: Bronze Medal in the World Championship in Japan
- 2011: Gold Medal in the Montreux Volley Masters in Switzerland
- 2011: 5th place in the World Grand Prix Final round in Macau, China
- 2011: Silver Medal in the 16th Senior Asian Championship in Taiwan
- 2011: 4th place in the World Cup in Japan
- 2012: Bronze Medal in the Olympic Games of London in the U.K.
- 2013: 4th place in the World Grand Prix Final round in Japan
- 2013: Silver medal in the Asian Championship in Thailand
- 2013: Bronze Medal in the Grand Champions Cup in Japan
- 2014: Silver medal in the 2014 Grand Prix in Japan
- 2014: 7th place in the World Championship in Italy
- 2015: Silver medal in the Montreux Volley Masters in Switzerland
- 2015: 6th place in the World Grand Prix Final round in the United States
- 2015: 5th place in the World Cup in Japan
- 2016: 5th place in the Olympic Games of Rio de Janeiro in Brazil

Awards
Preceded by (China) Yang Hao	Best Server of FIVB World Grand Prix; 2008	Succeeded by (Netherlands) Manon Flier
