= Liao Wanru =

People named Liao Wanru may refer to:

- Liao Wan-ju (廖婉汝; born 1960), Taiwanese politician elected legislator elected through proportional representation and overseas Chinese ballots in 2008
- Liao Wan-ju (廖琬如; born 1984), Taiwanese female volleyball player
