= Sachiko Kodama (volleyball) =

Japanese volleyball player (born 1978)

Personal information
- Nationality: Japanese
- Born: 15 September 1978 (age 48); Karatsu, Saga, Japan
- Height: 171 cm (67 in)

Volleyball information
- Position: outside hitter
- Number: 9 (national team)

Career
Years	Teams
2002	(Japan) Toray Arrows

National team
2002	Japan

Sachiko Kodama (born 15 September 1978) is a retired Japanese female volleyball player, playing as an outside hitter. She was part of the Japan women's national volleyball team.

She participated in the 2002 FIVB Volleyball Women's World Championship. She won the bronze medal at the 2002 Asian Games. On club level she played for Toray Arrows in 2002.
