= Maiko Kano =

Japanese retired volleyball player (born 1988)

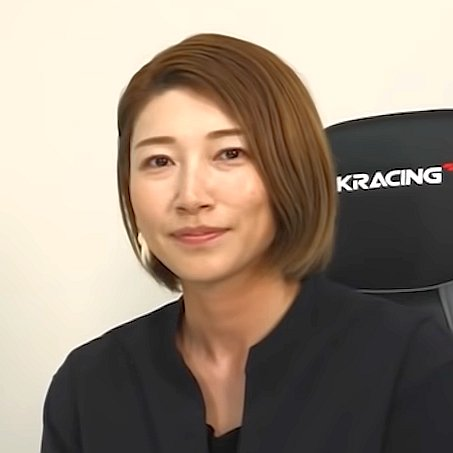
- Kano in 2022

Personal information
- Full name: Maiko Kiriyama (after marriage)
- Born: Maiko Kano; July 5, 1988 (age 38); Mitaka, Tokyo, Japan
- Height: 185 cm (6 ft 1 in)
- Weight: 72 kg (159 lb)
- Spike: 304 cm (120 in)
- Block: 285 cm (112 in)

National team
Japan
Medal record
Women's volleyball
Representing Japan
Olympic Games
Bronze medal – third place	2012 London	Team
World Championship
Bronze medal – third place	2010 Japan	Team
Asian Championship
Silver medal – second place	2011 Taipei
Bronze medal – third place	2009 Hanoi

Maiko Kano (狩野舞子 Kano Maiko, born July 15, 1988) is a former Japanese volleyball player. She was part of the Japanese team that won bronze at the 2012 Summer Olympics. Kumi Nakada (the coach of Hisamitu Springs) converted her to setter in 2012-13 season.

== Personal life ==
Kano was born on July 5, 1988, in Mitaka City, Tokyo. Fellow volleyball player Miyuki Kano is her elder sister. She became a volleyball player at 10 years old.

She was elected the candidate player of the national team when she was a junior high school student.

=== Marriage ===
Kano announced her marriage to singer and actor Akito Kiriyama on January 3, 2025. The couple’s relationship was first reported in April 2023, they met in 2019 after working together on Fuji TV’s 2019 World Cup Volleyball coverage, where WEST served as special supporters.

== Clubs ==
- (Japan) Hachiouji Jissen Junior High
- (Japan) Hachiouji Jissen High School
- (Japan) Hisamitsu Springs (2007–2010)
- (Italy) Minerva Volley Pavia (2010-2011)
- (Turkey) Beşiktaş (2011-2012)
- (Japan) Hisamitsu Springs (2012–2015)
- (Japan) PFU BlueCats (2015–2018)

== Honours ==
=== Individuals ===
- 2009 Kurowashiki All Japan Volleyball Tournament Excellent player awards, Best 6

=== Team ===
- 2007 Empress's Cup - Runner-Up, with Hisamitsu Springs.
- 2008-2009 V.Premier League - Runner-Up, with Hisamitsu Springs.
- 2012 Empress's Cup - Champion, with Hisamitsu Springs.
- 2012-2013 V.Premier League - Champion, with Hisamitsu Springs.
- 2013 - Japan-Korea V.League Top Match - Champion, with Hisamitsu Springs.
- 2013 - Kurowashiki All Japan Volleyball Tournament - Champion, with Hisamitsu Springs.
- 2014 Asian Club Championship - Champion, with Hisamitsu Springs.

=== National team ===
- 2011: 4th place in the World Cup in Japan
- 2012: Bronze Medal in the Olympic Games of London
