= Megumi Kurihara =

Japanese volleyball player

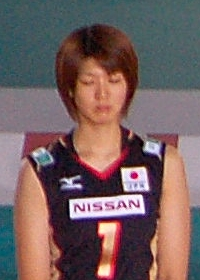

Personal information
- Full name: Megumi Kurihara
- Nickname: Meg, Kou; Princess Meg
- Born: July 31, 1984 (age 42); Etajima, Hiroshima, Japan
- Height: 1.87 m (6 ft 2 in)
- Weight: 69 kg (152 lb)
- Spike: 315 cm (124 in)
- Block: 295 cm (116 in)

Volleyball information
- Position: Outside hitter
- Current club: JT Marvelous

National team
Japan
Medal record
Women's volleyball
Representing Japan
World Championship
Bronze medal – third place	2010 Japan	Team
Asian Championship
Bronze medal – third place	2009 Hanoi	Team

Megumi Kurihara (栗原恵 Kurihara Megumi, born July 31, 1984) is a Japanese volleyball former player who played for JT Marvelous. She also played for the All-Japan women's volleyball team and participated at the 2004 and 2008 Summer Olympics. Her nickname is "Princess Meg" (プリンセス・メグ).

== Biography ==
Kurihara began playing volleyball in the fourth grade. June, 1998 there was an eighth grader, study abroad. The senior high school enters Mitajiri girls' high school (existing Seiei High School) of Hōfu, Yamaguchi Prefecture, and experiences three senior high school crowns of high valley championship in a first grader in an Inter-highschool/National Sports Festival of Japan/ spring volleyball match. She was chosen as a member of the Japan women's national volleyball team in her third year of high school.

In 2003, she joined NEC Red Rockets of the V league (Premier League). She won the young eagle Prize in the black eagle flag meet in May 2003. At the World Cup in November 2003, she attracted attention at the age of 19 years old Kana Oyama. She participated in the 2004 Summer Olympics, the following year and achieved the fifth place.

Megumi Kurihara was dismissed from the NEC Red Rockets in October 2004, reason being that "her style did not match valley-style of NEC". There was a rumor of a transfer to the Italian Volleyball League, but then Megumi joined the Pioneer Red Wings in November 2004.

The No.11 V league was not able to participate from a meeting rule that "the player who signed for a club after the start of a season cannot participate in the league match" for 2004-05 season. A pennant race played a held black eagle flag meeting in May 2005 and contributed to team championship. After a meeting, she left the team during a little by opposition with the director Arie Selinger, but then returned to the team in the middle of August, and the No.12 V league participates from the opening game for 2005–06. She contributed to championship for the first time in two pioneer seasons greatly and acquired the prize for best distinguished services player / serve / best 6.

Megumi Kurihara was selected for an All-Japan Women's volleyball team in 2006, but was injured during a training camp and sent for the rehabilitation life at the middle of the year.

Megumi then retired from the Red Wings in June 2011.

On 11 July 2012, Okayama Seagulls announced that Kurihara will move from Kazan to the team the following season.

In 2016, Megumi was diagnosed with Cerebral venous sinus thrombosis, and lost part of the 2016-17 season, she recovered successfully after surgery where after she had to learn how to walk again and then started playing in her club again. Finally, in 2019, she decided to retire and end her professional career.

== Clubs ==
- (Japan) MitajiriJoshi High School (2000–2003)
- (Japan) NEC Red Rockets (2003–2004)
- (Japan) Pioneer Red Wings (2004–2011)
- (Russia) Dynamo Kazan (2011–2012)
- (Japan) Okayama Seagulls (2012–2014)
- (Japan) Hitachi Rivale (2014–2018)
- (Japan) JT Marvelous (2018–19)

== Awards ==
=== Individuals ===
- 2006 - The 12th V.League MVP, Serve award, best 6
- 2007 - 2006-07 Premier League Serve award (New Record)
- 2008 FIVB World Grand Prix "Best Server"
- 2008 FIVB World Grand Prix "Best Scorer"
- 2009 - 2008-09 Premier League Serve award

=== Team ===
- 2006 - The 12th V.League - Champion, with Pioneer.
- 2008 - Empress's Cup - Runner-Up, with Pioneer.

=== National team ===
- 2003: 5th place in the World Cup in Japan
- 2004: 5th place in the Olympic Games of Athens
- 2007: 7th place in the World Cup in Japan
- 2008: 5th place in the Olympic Games of Beijing
- 2010 World Championship - Bronze medal

Awards
Preceded by (Italy) Taismary Agüero	World Grand Prix Best Scorer; 2008	Succeeded by (Netherlands) Manon Flier
