= Zhang Jing (volleyball) =

Chinese volleyball player (born 1979)

Personal information
- Nationality: Chinese
- Born: 14 October 1979 (age 47)
- Height: 190 cm (75 in)

Volleyball information
- Position: outside hitter

Career
- Years: Team
- 2002: Shanghai

National team
- Years: Team
- 2002: China

Zhang Jing (张静; born 14 October 1979) is a retired Chinese female volleyball player, playing as an outside hitter. She was part of the China women's national volleyball team.

She participated in the 2002 FIVB Volleyball Women's World Championship. She won the gold medal at the 2002 Asian Games. On club level she played for Shanghai in 2002.
