= Astemo Rivale Ibaraki =

Japanese women's volleyball team

- Founded: 1980
- Ground: Hitachinaka, Ibaraki, Japan
- Manager Head coach: (Japan) Kazuhiro Tamura (Japan) Noboru Aihara
- Captain: Miwako Osanai
- League: SV.League
- 2025-26: 10th place
- Website: Club home page

Uniforms
Home	Away

Hitachi Rivale (日立リヴァーレ, Hitachi Rivuāre) is a women's volleyball team based in Hitachinaka city, Ibaraki, Japan. It plays in SV.League. The owner is Hitachi Automotive Systems.

== History ==
- It was founded in November 1980 as Hitachi Sawa Rivale.
- It was promoted to the V.League in 1998.
- In April 2009, it lost the V.challenge match, so it was demoted to the V.challenge League for the next season.
- In April 2010, the team name was changed to Hitachi Rivale.
- In April 2013, It was re-promoted to V. Premier League after beating Denso Airybees.

== Honours ==
V.Premier League

- Runners-up (1): 2016

Kurowashiki All Japan Volleyball Championship

- Runners-up (1): 2006

== League results ==
League		Position	Teams	Matches	Win	Lose
V.League	5th (1998–99)	8th	10	18	7	11
V.League	6th (1999–2000)	10th	10	18	3	15
V.League	9th (2002–03)	8th	8	21	3	18
V.League	10th (2003–04)	6th	10	18	7	11
V.League	11th (2004–05)	9th	10	27	7	20
V.League	12th (2005–06)	8th	10	27	10	17
V・Premier	2006-07	9th	10	27	6	21
V・Premier	2007-08	10th	10	27	1	26
V・Premier	2008-09	10th	10	27	0	27
V・Challenge	2009-10	Champion	12	16	15	1
V・Challenge	2010-11	Runner-up	12	18	17	1
V・Challenge	2011-12	Champion	12	22	21	1
V・Challenge	2012-13	Runner-up	10	18	17	1
V・Premier	2013-14	6th	8	28	12	16
V・Premier	2014-15	4th	8	21	7	14
V・Premier	2015-16	Runner-up	8	21	13	8
V・Premier	2016-17	3rd	8	21	14	7
V・Premier	2017–18	8th	8	21	5	16
V.League Division 1 (V1)	2018–19	8th	11	20	8	12
V.League Division 1 (V1)	2019-20	9th	12	21	6	15
V.League Division 1 (V1)	2020–21	8th	12	21	6	15
SV.League	2024-25	8th	14	44	23	21
SV.League	2025-26	10th	14	44	18	26

== Current squad ==
2026/27 Squad as of November 2026

- Head coach: (Japan) Noboru Aihara

No.	Name	Position	Date of birth	Height (m)
1	(Japan) Ruriko Uesaka (C)	Outside Hitter	7 September 1999 (age 27)	1.75 m (5 ft 9 in)
2	(Japan) Yuki Fujikura	Setter	27 August 1999 (age 27)	1.65 m (5 ft 5 in)
4	(Japan) Yui Hamamura	Outside Hitter	10 August 2003 (age 23)	1.71 m (5 ft 7 in)
5	(Japan) Reika Sato	Middle Blocker	10 January 2001 (age 25)	1.76 m (5 ft 9 in)
6	(United States) Danielle Cuttino	Opposite Hitter	22 June 1996 (age 30)	1.95 m (6 ft 5 in)
7	(Japan) Amika Tokumoto	Libero	13 June 2004 (age 22)	1.52 m (5 ft 0 in)
9	(Japan) Mimika Namaizawa	Outside Hitter	18 February 2005 (age 21)	1.77 m (5 ft 10 in)
10	(Japan) Merumo Ishimori	Setter	10 September 1998 (age 28)	1.66 m (5 ft 5 in)
11	(Japan) Shion Okabe	Outside Hitter	25 November 2005 (age 20)	1.78 m (5 ft 10 in)
13	(Japan) Samura Mai	Outside Hitter	1 June 2003 (age 23)	1.68 m (5 ft 6 in)
14	(Japan) Mion Hirose	Outside Hitter	8 October 2002 (age 24)	1.74 m (5 ft 9 in)
15	(Japan) Niji Sato	Middle Blocker	9 February 2007 (age 19)	1.81 m (5 ft 11 in)
17	(Japan) Aya Watanabe	Middle Blocker	23 April 1991 (age 35)	1.76 m (5 ft 9 in)
18	(Japan) Ayaka Eto	Middle Blocker	22 June 2000 (age 26)	1.80 m (5 ft 11 in)
19	(Croatia) Bozana Butigan	Middle Blocker	19 August 2000 (age 26)	1.92 m (6 ft 4 in)
22	(Japan) Kaera Chuganji	Middle Blocker	13 November 2006 (age 20)	1.77 m (5 ft 10 in)
31	(United States) Elia Rubin	Outside Hitter	13 March 2004 (age 22)	1.85 m (6 ft 1 in)

== Former players ==
Domestic Players

Japan

- Yuki Sugawara Tanaka (2006-2008)
- Akiko Ino (2005-2007)
- Keiko Kuroha (2005–2009)
- Megumi Itabashi (2003–2009)
- Mariko Futakawa (2007–2009)
- Ayano Inishi (2006–2009)
- Kaori Iida (1998–2009)
- Miki Shimada (2006–2009)
- Narumi Takashima (2007–2009)
- Saori Ishida (2007–2009)
- Makoto Matsuura (2009–2010)
- Sae Ishida (2008-2015)
- Akari Fujisaki (2007-2010)
- Yurie Yamamoto (2009-2010)
- Ai Yoshida (2008-2011)
- Airi Kawahara (2009-2011)
- Kaori Nakamura (2007-2011)
- Kotomi Tosaki (2008-2011)
- Midori Miyakozawa (2001–2006, 2011–2012)
- Asako Tajimi (2011–2012)
- Momoka Minami (2011–14)
- Yukiko Ebata (2007–14)
- Yukino Nagamatsu (2011–2014)
- Saori Takahashi (2011–2014)
- Marie Wada (2013–2015)
- Arisa Satō (2012–2018)
- Megumi Kurihara (2014–2018)
- Mami Uchiseto (2013–2017)
- Kana Shimohira (2016–2018)
- Kaori Mabashi (2016-2019) Transfer to Kurobe AquaFairies
- Moemi Toi (2006-2019)
- Hisae Watanabe (ja) (2013–2020)
- Sakura Doi (2016–2020)
- Yuka Onodera (2015–2021)
- Uran Horii (2017–2021)
- Miyu Kubota (ja) (2017–2021)
- Maiha Haga (2015–2021)
- Miya Sato (2011–2021)

Foreign Players

Belgium

- Laura Heyrman (2018-2019)

Dominican Republic

- Sidarka Núñez (2008–2009)

Netherlands

- Francien Huurman(2011–2012)

Thailand

- Thatdao Nuekjang (2023-2024)

United States

- Brionne Butler (2024-)
- Cursty Le Roux (2016-2018)
- Lauren Paolini (2013-2017)
- Mackenzie May (2024-)
