= Ayako Ōnuma =

Japanese volleyball player (born 1979)

Personal information
- Nationality: Japanese
- Born: 17 April 1979 (age 47); Mikawa, Yamagata, Japan
- Height: 180 cm (71 in)
- Weight: 72 kg (159 lb)
- Spike: 302 cm (119 in)
- Block: 297 cm (117 in)

Volleyball information
- Number: 8 (national team)

Career
Years	Teams
2005	Hitachi Sawa Rivale

National team
2005	Japan

Ayako Ōnuma (大沼 綾子, Ōnuma Ayako; born 17 April 1979) is a Japanese female volleyball player. She was part of the Japan women's national volleyball team.

She participated in the 2005 FIVB Volleyball World Grand Prix. On club level she played for Hitachi Sawa Rivale in 2005.
