= Kotomi Tosaki =

Japanese volleyball player

Personal information
- Full name: Kotomi Tosaki
- Nickname: Koto
- Born: May 19, 1989 (age 37); Gifu, Gifu, Japan
- Height: 1.85 m (6 ft 1 in)
- Weight: 84 kg (185 lb)
- Spike: 293 cm (115 in)
- Block: 275 cm (108 in)

Volleyball information
- Position: Middle Blocker
- Current club: Hitachi Sawa Rivale
- Number: 22

National team
Japan

Kotomi Tosaki (戸崎 琴美 Tosaki Kotomi, born 19 May 1989) is a Japanese volleyball player who plays for Hitachi Sawa Rivale.

== Clubs ==
- KyoeiGakuen High School → Hitachi Sawa Rivale (2008-)

== National team ==
- (Japan) 2008 - 1st AVC Women's Cup
