= Minako Onuki =

Japanese volleyball player

Personal information
- Nationality: Japanese
- Born: 15 October 1972 (age 54)
- Height: 1.73 m (5 ft 8 in)
- Spike: 3.00 m (118 in)
- Block: 2.89 m (114 in)

Volleyball information
- Position: Setter
- Number: 1 (national team)

National team
1997-2002	Japan
Honours
Women's volleyball
Representing Japan
World Grand Champions Cup
Bronze medal – third place	2001 Japan
Asian Games
Bronze medal – third place	1998 Bangkok	Team
Bronze medal – third place	2002 Busan	Team

Minako Onuki (大貫 美奈子, Ōnuki Minako; born 15 October 1972) is a retired Japanese female volleyball player.

Onuki was part of the Japanese women's national volleyball team at the 1998 FIVB World Championship in Japan and in the 2002 FIVB World Championship in Germany.
