= 2008 FIVB Volleyball World Grand Prix =

Volleyball competition held in Japan

2018 FIVB World Grand Prix
Tournament details
- Host country: Japan (Final)
- Dates: 20 June – 12 July
- Teams: 12
- Venue: 1 (in 1 host city)

Final positions
- Champions: Brazil (7th title)
- Runners-up: Cuba
- Third place: Italy
- Fourth place: United States

Tournament awards
- MVP: (Brazil) Marianne Steinbrecher

The FIVB World Grand Prix 2008 was a women's volleyball tournament in which 12 countries competed from 20 June to 12 July 2008. The finals were held in Yokohama Arena, Yokohama, Japan. Cuba, Brazil, Dominican Republic and the United States qualified for the tournament at the 2007 Women's Pan-American Cup in Colima, Mexico. Germany, Turkey, Italy, and Poland qualified through the European Qualifying Tournament in Ankara, Turkey. China, Japan, Thailand, and Kazakhstan qualified as the best four Asian teams.

== Competing nations ==
The following national teams qualified:

Europe	America	Asia
Germany; Italy; Poland; Turkey	Brazil; Cuba; Dominican Republic; United States	China; Japan; Kazakhstan; Thailand

== Calendar ==
Week 1 20–22 June 2008
Group A: Kobe, Japan	Group B: Ningbo, China	Group C: Alassio, Italy
Japan; United States; Turkey; Kazakhstan	China; Brazil; Germany; Thailand	Italy; Cuba; Poland; Dominican Republic
Week 2 27–29 June 2008
Group D: Vĩnh Phúc, Vietnam	Group E: Wrocław, Poland	Group F: Hong Kong
Brazil; Turkey; Kazakhstan; Germany	Poland; United States; Dominican Republic; Thailand	Italy; China; Japan; Cuba
Week 3 4–6 July 2008
Group G: Bangkok, Thailand	Group H: Taipei, Chinese Taipei	Group I: Macau
Thailand; Cuba; Kazakhstan; Germany	Italy; United States; Turkey; Poland	China; Brazil; Japan; Dominican Republic
Week 4 Final Round 9–13 July 2008
Yokohama, Japan
Top five teams Brazil; China; Italy; United States; Cuba and Japan as host

== Preliminary round ==
=== Ranking ===
The host Japan and top five teams in the preliminary round advance to the final round.

Pos	Team	Pld	W	L	Pts	SW	SL	SR	SPW	SPL	SPR	Qualification
1	Brazil	9	8	1	17	26	6	4.333	766	639	1.199	Final round
2	China	9	8	1	17	24	10	2.400	783	687	1.140	Final round
3	Italy	9	8	1	17	26	10	2.600	844	751	1.124	Final round
4	United States	9	7	2	16	22	11	2.000	771	664	1.161	Final round
5	Cuba	9	6	3	15	22	15	1.467	856	785	1.090	Final round
6	Turkey	9	4	5	13	16	17	0.941	743	732	1.015	
7	Germany	9	4	5	13	16	16	1.000	710	709	1.001	
8	Dominican Republic	9	4	5	13	15	19	0.789	725	761	0.953	
9	Japan (Note: Qualified as hosts) (H)	9	2	7	11	9	23	0.391	641	737	0.870	Final round
10	Poland	9	1	8	10	13	24	0.542	768	855	0.898	
11	Thailand	9	1	8	10	10	26	0.385	710	824	0.862	
12	Kazakhstan	9	1	8	10	4	26	0.154	552	725	0.761	

(H) Host

=== First round ===
==== Group A ====
Date		Score		Set 1	Set 2	Set 3	Set 4	Set 5	Total	Report
20 Jun	Turkey	3–1	United States	28–26	25–16	21–25	25–19		99–86	P2 P3
20 Jun	Japan	3–0	Kazakhstan	25–17	25–13	25–23			75–53	P2 P3
21 Jun	Kazakhstan	0–3	United States	16–25	17–25	18–25			51–75	P2 P3
21 Jun	Japan	3–2	Turkey	21–25	25–16	17–25	25–19	15–12	103–97	P2 P3
22 Jun	Kazakhstan	0–3	Turkey	17–25	24–26	15–25			56–76	P2 P3
22 Jun	Japan	2–3	United States	29–27	18–25	25–18	16–25	13–15	101–110	P2 P3

==== Group B ====
Date		Score		Set 1	Set 2	Set 3	Set 4	Set 5	Total	Report
20 Jun	Brazil	3–0	Thailand	25–22	25–18	25–20			75–60	P2 P3
20 Jun	China	3–1	Germany	19–25	25–19	25–11	25–21		94–76	P2 P3
21 Jun	China	3–0	Thailand	25–11	25–16	25–19			75–46	P2 P3
21 Jun	Germany	1–3	Brazil	25–15	23–25	20–25	28–30		96–95	P2 P3
22 Jun	Germany	3–1	Thailand	19–25	25–18	25–21	25–22		94–86	P2 P3
22 Jun	China	3–2	Brazil	22–25	26–24	22–25	25–22	15–13	110–109	P2 P3

==== Group C ====
Date		Score		Set 1	Set 2	Set 3	Set 4	Set 5	Total	Report
20 Jun	Cuba	3–1	Poland	25–20	29–31	25–21	26–24		105–96	P2 P3
20 Jun	Italy	3–1	Dominican Republic	19–25	25–19	25–17	25–15		94–76	P2 P3
21 Jun	Dominican Republic	0–3	Cuba	22–25	15–25	19–25			56–75	P2 P3
21 Jun	Italy	3–1	Poland	25–17	25–22	23–25	25–16		98–80	P2 P3
22 Jun	Poland	2–3	Dominican Republic	21–25	25–23	25–19	23–25	11–15	105–107	P2 P3
22 Jun	Italy	3–0	Cuba	25–23	27–25	27–25			79–73	P2 P3

=== Second round ===
==== Group D ====
Date		Score		Set 1	Set 2	Set 3	Set 4	Set 5	Total	Report
27 Jun	Brazil	3–0	Kazakhstan	25–10	25–17	25–19			75–46	P2 P3
27 Jun	Turkey	3–1	Germany	25–21	25–22	25–27	25–18		100–88	P2 P3
28 Jun	Kazakhstan	0–3	Germany	17–25	19–25	21–25			57–75	P2 P3
28 Jun	Brazil	3–0	Turkey	25–23	25–19	25–15			75–57	P2 P3
29 Jun	Germany	0–3	Brazil	15–25	25–27	16–25			56–77	P2 P3
29 Jun	Turkey	3–0	Kazakhstan	25–16	25–20	25–17			75–53	P2 P3

==== Group E ====
Date		Score		Set 1	Set 2	Set 3	Set 4	Set 5	Total	Report
27 Jun	Poland	1–3	Dominican Republic	22–25	25–19	17–25	20–25		84–94	P2 P3
27 Jun	Thailand	1–3	United States	18–25	17–25	28–26	13–25		76–101	P2 P3
28 Jun	Poland	2–3	Thailand	25–19	21–25	25–18	23–25	4–15	98–102	P2 P3
28 Jun	United States	3–0	Dominican Republic	25–13	25–21	25–20			75–54	P2 P3
29 Jun	Poland	0–3	United States	17–25	16–25	20–25			53–75	P2 P3
29 Jun	Dominican Republic	3–1	Thailand	25–19	24–26	25–21	25–22		99–88	P2 P3

==== Group F ====
Date		Score		Set 1	Set 2	Set 3	Set 4	Set 5	Total	Report
27 Jun	Italy	3–0	Japan	25–17	25–20	25–22			75–59	P2 P3
27 Jun	China	3–2	Cuba	25–18	25–27	21–25	25–21	15–13	111–104	P2 P3
28 Jun	Cuba	2–3	Italy	25–21	19–25	25–19	20–25	13–15	102–105	P2 P3
28 Jun	China	3–0	Japan	25–16	29–27	25–22			79–65	P2 P3
29 Jun	Japan	1–3	Cuba	25–22	21–25	19–25	16–25		81–97	P2 P3
29 Jun	China	3–2	Italy	18–25	25–20	21–25	27–25	15–8	106–103	P2 P3

=== Third round ===
==== Group G ====
Date		Score		Set 1	Set 2	Set 3	Set 4	Set 5	Total	Report
4 Jul	Thailand	2–3	Kazakhstan	19–25	19–25	25–19	25–17	14–16	102–102	P2 P3
4 Jul	Cuba	3–1	Germany	23–25	25–21	25–8	25–21		98–75	P2 P3
5 Jul	Germany	3–0	Thailand	25–18	25–15	25–16			75–49	P2 P3
5 Jul	Kazakhstan	1–3	Cuba	25–22	19–25	21–25	16–25		81–97	P2 P3
6 Jul	Thailand	2–3	Cuba	20–25	22–25	25–23	25–17	9–15	101–105	P2 P3
6 Jul	Germany	3–0	Kazakhstan	25–15	25–19	25–19			75–53	P2 P3

==== Group H ====
Date		Score		Set 1	Set 2	Set 3	Set 4	Set 5	Total	Report
4 Jul	United States	3–1	Poland	20–25	25–23	25–19	25–10		95–77	P2 P3
4 Jul	Italy	3–1	Turkey	25–20	21–25	30–28	25–23		101–96	P2 P3
5 Jul	United States	3–1	Turkey	25–16	25–20	20–25	25–17		95–78	P2 P3
5 Jul	Italy	3–2	Poland	23–25	23–25	25–20	25–14	18–16	114–100	P2 P3
6 Jul	Poland	3–0	Turkey	25–21	25–22	25–22			75–65	P2 P3
6 Jul	Italy	3–0	United States	25–22	25–21	25–16			75–59	P2 P3

==== Group I ====
Date		Score		Set 1	Set 2	Set 3	Set 4	Set 5	Total	Report
4 Jul	Brazil	3–2	Dominican Republic	23–25	22–25	25–22	25–23	15–9	110–104	P2 P3
4 Jul	China	3–0	Japan	25–16	25–19	25–15			75–50	P2 P3
5 Jul	Brazil	3–0	Japan	25–16	25–21	25–15			75–52	P2 P3
5 Jul	China	3–0	Dominican Republic	25–16	25–22	25–21			75–59	P2 P3
6 Jul	Dominican Republic	3–0	Japan	26–24	25–13	25–18			76–55	P2 P3
6 Jul	China	0–3	Brazil	21–25	17–25	20–25			58–75	P2 P3

== Final round ==
- Venue– Yokohama Arena, Yokohama

Date		Score		Set 1	Set 2	Set 3	Set 4	Set 5	Total	Report
9 Jul	Brazil	3–0	United States	25–19	25–19	25–23			75–61	P2 P3
9 Jul	China	2–3	Italy	25–22	27–29	25–20	20–25	9–15	106–111	P2 P3
9 Jul	Japan	1–3	Cuba	25–19	23–25	18–25	19–25		85–94	P2 P3
10 Jul	China	1–3	Cuba	21–25	25–20	24–26	16–25		86–96	P2 P3
10 Jul	Italy	0–3	Brazil	20–25	17–25	23–25			60–75	P2 P3
10 Jul	Japan	2–3	United States	28–26	20–25	25–22	20–25	11–15	104–113	P2 P3
11 Jul	Brazil	3–1	China	25–18	25–16	21–25	25–18		96–77	P2 P3
11 Jul	Cuba	3–2	United States	22–25	17–25	25–18	25–21	15–11	104–100	P2 P3
11 Jul	Japan	3–0	Italy	25–23	25–22	26–24			76–69	P2 P3
12 Jul	Brazil	3–0	Cuba	25–14	25–15	25–20			75–49	P2 P3
12 Jul	Italy	3–1	United States	25–17	26–28	25–19	25–19		101–83	P2 P3
12 Jul	Japan	1–3	China	17–25	30–28	15–25	21–25		83–103	P2 P3
13 Jul	United States	3–2	China	25–23	25–19	22–25	21–25	17–15	110–107	P2 P3
13 Jul	Cuba	3–1	Italy	28–30	25–18	25–23	25–19		103–90	P2 P3
13 Jul	Japan	0–3	Brazil	23–25	23–25	19–25			65–75	P2 P3

=== Final ranking ===
Pos	Team	Pld	W	L	Pts	SW	SL	SR	SPW	SPL	SPR
1	Brazil	5	5	0	10	15	1	15.000	396	312	1.269
2	Cuba	5	4	1	9	12	8	1.500	446	436	1.023
3	Italy	5	2	3	7	7	12	0.583	431	443	0.973
4	United States	5	2	3	7	9	13	0.692	467	491	0.951
5	China	5	1	4	6	9	13	0.692	479	496	0.966
6	Japan	5	1	4	6	7	12	0.583	412	454	0.907

== Overall ranking ==
Place	Team
1st place, gold medalist(s)	Brazil
2nd place, silver medalist(s)	Cuba
3rd place, bronze medalist(s)	Italy
4	United States
5	China
6	Japan
7	Turkey
8	Germany
9	Dominican Republic
10	Poland
11	Thailand
12	Kazakhstan

2008 FIVB Women's World Grand Prix winners

Brazil
Seventh title

Team roster
Walewska Oliveira, Carolina Albuquerque, Marianne Steinbrecher, Paula Pequeno, Thaísa Menezes, Hélia Souza (c), Valeska Menezes, Fabiana Claudino, Wélissa Gonzaga, Jaqueline Carvalho, Sheilla Castro, Fabiana Oliveira
Head coach
José Roberto Guimarães

== Individual awards ==
- Most valuable player:
  - Marianne Steinbrecher (BRA)
- Best spiker:
  - Daimí Ramírez (CUB)
- Best blocker:
  - Walewska Oliveira (BRA)
- Best server:
  - Megumi Kurihara (JPN)
- Best libero:
  - Yuko Sano (JPN)
- Best setter:
  - Yoshie Takeshita (JPN)
- Best scorer:
  - Megumi Kurihara (JPN)
