= Shoichi Yanagimoto =

Japanese volleyball player (born 1951)

Personal information
- Nationality: Japanese
- Born: 5 June 1951 (age 75); Taishō-ku, Osaka, Japan
- Height: 1.82 m (6 ft 0 in)
- Education: Osaka University of Commerce

Coaching information
Previous teams coached
Years	Teams
1985; 1986; 1997; 2003–2008	Thailand men's national team (Japan) Nissin Steel (Japan) Toyobo Orchids Japan women's national team

Volleyball information
- Position: Setter

Career
Years	Teams
1970–1971	(Japan) Teijin Mihara
1971–N/A	(Japan) Nippon Steel
1986–N/A	(Japan) Nissin Steel

National team
1973–N/A	Japan

Shoichi Yanagimoto (柳本 晶一, Yanagimoto Shōichi; born 5 June 1951) is a Japanese volleyball player. He competed in the men's tournament at the 1976 Summer Olympics. He announced retirement in 1991.
