= Hisako Mukai =

Japanese volleyball player (born 1978)

Personal information
- Nationality: Japanese
- Born: 1 March 1978 (age 48); Hatsukaichi, Hiroshima, Japan
- Height: 1.77 m (5 ft 10 in)

Volleyball information
- Position: wing spiker
- Current club: Toray Arrows
- Number: 8 (national team)

National team
2002	Japan

Hisako Mukai (born 1 March 1978) is a retired Japanese female volleyball player, who played as a wing spiker. She was part of the Japan women's national volleyball team at the 2002 FIVB Volleyball Women's World Championship in Germany, and at the 2002 Asian Games. On club level she played with Toray Arrows.

== Clubs ==
- Toray Arrows (2002)
