= Kaoru Sugayama =

Japanese volleyball player (born 1978)

Medal record

Women's volleyball

Representing Japan

Asian Games
Silver medal – second place	2006 Doha	Team competition

Kaoru Sugayama (菅山かおる, Sugayama Kaoru; born December 26, 1978) is a Japanese volleyball player. Although her nickname is "yuu", Ai Otomo already had that nickname on the All-Japan women's Team, so she was given the new nickname "kaoru". Her nickname in television broadcasts is "koushuni kagayaku Kaoru-hime", (攻守に輝くカオル姫, translation: "Princess Kaoru who shines in offense and defense"). Also, she is sometimes known as "shiroi yousei" (白い妖精, translation: "White fairy") due in part to her fair skin. However, she is embarrassed to be called "Princess Kaoru" or "White fairy". She belongs to the volleyball team JT Marvelous of the V.League. In May 2008, she retired from the team and from organized volleyball.

She married volleyball player Koichi Nishimura in 2011.
