= Yuka Sakurai =

Japanese volleyball player

Personal information
- Full name: Yuka Sakurai
- Nickname: Ebi
- Born: September 2, 1974 (age 52) kaizu, Gifu, Japan
- Height: 1.67 m (5 ft 6 in)
- Weight: 62 kg (137 lb)
- Spike: 284 cm (112 in)
- Block: 272 cm (107 in)

Volleyball information
- Position: Libero
- Current club: Denso Airybees
- Number: 9

National team
- Years: Team
- –: Japan

Yuka Sakurai (櫻井由香 Sakurai Yuka, born September 2, 1974) is a Japanese volleyball player who plays for Denso Airybees.

== Clubs ==
- Yorojoshi Shogyo High School → Denso Airybees (1993-)

== National team ==
- Japan 1998-2002, 2005, 2007-

== Awards ==
=== Individual ===
- 2005 11th V.League Best Libero award

=== Team ===
- 2008 2007-08 Japan Volleyball League/V.League/V.Premier - Runner-up, with Denso.
- 2008 57th Kurowashiki All Japan Volleyball Championship - Champion, with Denso.
- 2010 Empress's Cup - Champion, with Denso.

=== National team ===
- 2008: 5th place in the Olympic Games of Beijing
