= Liao Wan-ju =

Taiwanese volleyball player (born 1984)

Personal information
- Nationality: Chinese Taipei
- Born: 19 April 1984 (age 42)
- Height: 175 cm (69 in)
- Weight: 68 kg (150 lb)
- Spike: 290 cm (114 in)
- Block: 275 cm (108 in)

Volleyball information
- Number: 9 (national team)

National team
2012	Chinese Taipei

Liao Wan-ju (born Chinese: 廖琬如; 19 April 1984) is a Taiwanese female volleyball player. She was part of the Chinese Taipei women's national volleyball team.

She participated in the 2010 FIVB Volleyball World Grand Prix, and in the 2012 FIVB Volleyball World Grand Prix.
