= Yuliya Kutsko =

Kazakhstani volleyball player (born 1980)

Personal information
- Nationality: Kazakhstani
- Born: 18 April 1980 (age 46) Baranavichy, Byelorussian SSR, Soviet Union
- Height: 1.91 m (6 ft 3 in)
- Weight: 74 kg (163 lb)
- Spike: 305 cm (120 in)
- Block: 295 cm (116 in)

Volleyball information
- Number: 5

Career
- Years: Team
- 2008: (Kazakhstan) Rahat

National team
- Years: Team
- 2008: Kazakhstan

Yuliya Kutsko (born 18 April 1980) is a Kazakhstani female volleyball player. She was part of the Kazakhstan women's national volleyball team. She competed with the national team at the 2008 Summer Olympics in Beijing, China. She played with Rahat in 2008.

== Clubs ==
- (Kazakhstan) Rahat (2008)

== See also ==
- Kazakhstan at the 2008 Summer Olympics
