= Megumi Itabashi =

Japanese volleyball player (born 1973)

Personal information
- Nationality: Japanese
- Born: 7 June 1973 (age 53); Taiwa, Miyagi, Japan
- Height: 166 cm (65 in)
- Weight: 70 kg (154 lb)
- Spike: 281 cm (111 in)
- Block: 272 cm (107 in)

Volleyball information
- Number: 4 (national team)

Career
Teams
	Hitachi Sawa Rivale

National team
Japan

Megumi Itabashi (板橋 恵, Itabashi Megumi; born 7 June 1973) is a Japanese female volleyball player.

She was part of the Japan women's national volleyball team, at the 2005 FIVB Women's World Grand Champions Cup, and the 2006 FIVB Volleyball World Grand Prix.

== Career ==
She played for Tohoku Fukushi University. On club level she played for Hitachi Sawa Rivale in 2006.
