= Kanako Omura =

Japanese volleyball player (born 1976)

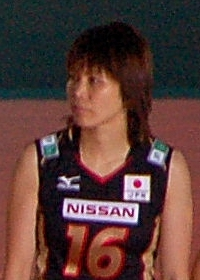

Personal information
- Full name: Kanako Omura
- Nickname: Kana
- Born: December 15, 1976 (age 49); Kyoto, Japan
- Height: 1.84 m (6 ft 0 in)
- Weight: 68 kg (150 lb)
- Spike: 319 cm (126 in)
- Block: 312 cm (123 in)

Volleyball information
- Position: Middle Blocker
- Current team: Hisamitsu Springs
- Number: 8

National team
Japan

Kanako Omura (大村加奈子, Ōmura Kanako; born December 15, 1976 in Nakagyō-ku, Kyoto) is a volleyball player from Japan.

She competed at the 2004 and 2008 Olympic Games for the Japanese team, finishing fifth on both occasions.
