= Olga Karpova =

Kazakhstani volleyball player (born 1980)

Personal information
- Nationality: Kazakhstani
- Born: 10 June 1980 (age 46) Minsk, Byelorussian SSR, Soviet Union

Sport
- Sport: Volleyball

Olga Karpova (Ольга Ромуальдовна Карпова, born 10 June 1980) is a retired Kazakhstani volleyball player. She competed in the women's tournament at the 2008 Summer Olympics.
