= Olga Nassedkina =

Kazakhstani volleyball player (born 1982)

Personal information
- Nationality: Kazakhstani
- Born: 28 December 1982 (age 43) Frunze, Kirghiz SSR, Soviet Union

Sport
- Sport: Volleyball

Olga Nassedkina (born 28 December 1982) is a retired Kazakhstani volleyball player. She competed in the women's tournament at the 2008 Summer Olympics. She was also part of the team that won bronze in the women's volleyball tournament at the 2010 Asian Games.
