= Miyuki Kano =

Japanese volleyball player

Personal information
- Full name: Miyuki Kano
- Nickname: Miyuki
- Born: May 17, 1977 (age 49); Mitaka, Tokyo, Japan
- Height: 1.75 m (5 ft 9 in)
- Weight: 65 kg (143 lb)
- Spike: 299 cm (118 in)

Volleyball information
- Position: Wing Spiker
- Current club: Fortuna Odense Volley
- Number: 6

National team
Japan

Miyuki Kano (狩野美雪 Kano Miyuki, born May 17, 1977) is a Japanese volleyball player who plays for Fortuna Odense Volley. She served as the Captain of Hisamitsu Springs between 2007 and 2010.

== Clubs ==
- (Japan) HachioujiJissen High School
- (Japan) TokyoGakugei Univ.
- (Japan) Mobara Alcas (2000–2006)
- (Japan) Hisamitsu Springs (2006–2010)
- (Denmark) Fortuna Odense Volley (2010-2011) (:dk)

== Awards ==
=== Individuals ===
- 2004 - 10th V.League (Japan) Servereceive award

=== National team ===
- 2008: 5th place in the Olympic Games of Beijing
