= Erika Araki =

Japanese volleyball player

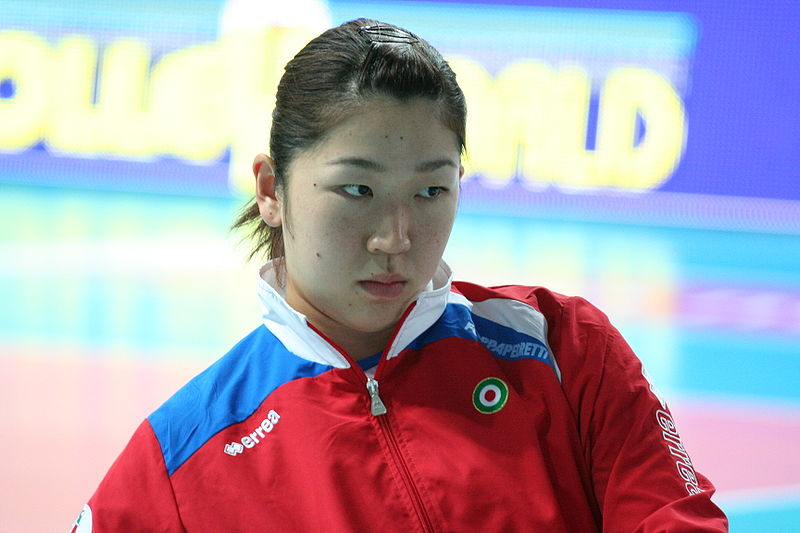

Personal information
- Nickname: Erica
- Born: 3 August 1984 (age 42); Kurashiki, Okayama, Japan
- Height: 1.86 m (6 ft 1 in)
- Weight: 78 kg (172 lb)
- Spike: 318 cm (125 in)
- Block: 312 cm (123 in)

Volleyball information
- Position: Middle blocker
- Number: 11 (2008-2010, 2016-2020); 5 (2012)

Career
Years	Teams
2003–2008; 2008–2009; 2009–2013; 2014–2016; 2016–2021	(Japan) Toray Arrows (Italy) Foppapedretti Bergamo (Japan) Toray Arrows (Japan) Ageo Medics (Japan) Toyota Auto Body Queenseis

National team
2005–2021 Japan
Honours
Women's volleyball
Representing Japan
Olympic Games
Bronze medal – third place	2012 London	Team
World Championship
Bronze medal – third place	2010 Japan	Team
Asian Games
Silver medal – second place	2006 Doha
Asian Championship
Gold medal – first place	2007 Suphanburi
Gold medal – first place	2017 Biñan/Muntinlupa
Silver medal – second place	2011 Taipei
Bronze medal – third place	2005 Taicang
Bronze medal – third place	2009 Hanoi

Erika Araki (荒木 絵里香, Araki Erika; born 3 August 1984) is a retired Japanese volleyball player. She served as captain for the national team from 2009 to 2012. She competed at the 2012 Summer Olympics winning a bronze medal, and 2020 Summer Olympics, in Women's volleyball which she was the captain.

== Career ==
Araki began her professional volleyball career with the Toray Arrows from 2003 to 2008. In July 2008, she joined Foppapedretti Bergamo. Araki returned to the Arrows the following season. From 2010 to 2013, Araki served as team captain. On 18 June 2013, the team announced her marriage. On 10 October 2013, Toray announced her pregnancy. Araki joined the Ageo Medics in 2014 then Toyota Auto Body Queenseis.

== Personal life ==
- Her father was a rugby player at Waseda University. Her mother was a PE teacher.
- She was good at swimming and athletics as a child.
- She became a volleyball player at 10 years old. At this age she was already 5 feet tall.
- While attending Seitoku Gakuen High School with Kana Oyama, the volleyball team were national high school champions.
- She has one daughter.

== Awards ==
=== Individual ===
- 2004 The 10th Women's V.League - Best 6
- 2006 The 12th Women's V.League - Best 6
- 2007–08 Women's V.Premier League - Most Valuable Player, Spike awards, Block awards, Best 6
- 2008 2008 Summer Olympics "Best Blocker"
- 2009–2010 V.Premier League - Spike awards
- 2010–2011 V.Premier League - Best 6
- 2011-2012 V.Premier League - MVP, Block awards, Best 6
- 2012-2013 V.Premier League - Excellent player awards, Block awards, Spike awards, Best server awards and Best 6

=== Team ===
- 2004 Kurowashiki All Japan Volleyball Tournament - Champion, with Toray Arrows
- 2007 Domestic Sports Festival (Volleyball) - Champion, with Toray Arrows
- 2007–2008 Empress's Cup - Champion, with Toray Arrows
- 2007–2008 V.Premier League - Champion, with Toray Arrows
- 2008-09 Champions League - Champion, with Volley Bergamo
- 2009–10 V.Premier League - Champion, with Toray Arrows
- 2010 Kurowashiki All Japan Volleyball Tournament - Champion, with Toray Arrows
- 2010–11 V.Premier League - Runner-up, with Toray Arrows
- 2011 Empress's Cup - Champion, with Toray Arrows
- 2011–12 V.Premier League - Champion, with Toray Arrows
- 2012-2013 V.Premier League - Runner-up, with Toray Arrows

=== National team ===
==== Senior team ====
- 2006: 6th place in the 2006 FIVB Women's World Championship in Japan
- 2007: 7th place in the 2007 FIVB Women's World Cup in Japan
- 2008: 5th place in the Volleyball at the 2008 Summer Olympics – Women's tournament in Beijing, 3rd place in the 2008 Asian Women's Cup Volleyball Championship in Nakhon Ratchasima
- 2009: 3rd place in the 2009 Asian Women's Volleyball Championship in vietnam
- 2010: 3rd place in the World Championship in Japan
- 2011 Montreux Volley Masters - Champion
- 2011 4th place in the World Cup in Japan
- 2012: 3rd place in the Volleyball at the 2012 Summer Olympics – Women's tournament in London
- 2017 Asian Women's Volleyball Championship - Champion
