= Olga Grushko =

Kazakhstani volleyball player (born 1976)

Personal information
- Nationality: Kazakhstani
- Born: 7 April 1976 (age 49) Yanibek, Kazakh SSR, Soviet Union

Sport
- Sport: Volleyball

Olga Grushko (Ольга Александровна Грушко, born 7 April 1976) is a retired Kazakhstani volleyball player. She competed in the women's tournament at the 2008 Summer Olympics and played for the Marmaris club in Turkey.
