= Akiko Ino =

Japanese volleyball player

Personal information
- Full name: Akiko Ino
- Nickname: Noah
- Born: September 28, 1986 (age 40); Edogawa, Tokyo, Japan
- Height: 1.68 m (5 ft 6 in)
- Weight: 60 kg (130 lb)
- Spike: 270 cm (106 in)
- Block: 261 cm (103 in)

Volleyball information
- Position: Libero
- Current club: Baki-Azeryol

National team
Japan
Medal record
Women's volleyball
Representing Japan
World Championship
Bronze medal – third place	2010 Japan	National team

Akiko Ino (井野 亜季子, Ino Akiko; born September 28, 1986) is a Japanese volleyball player who plays for Baki-Azeryol.

== Profiles ==
- She became a volleyball player at 10 years old.
- Her nickname "Sei" was derived from the name of her former high school.
- Her new nickname, "Noah", is derived from her name: "iNO Akiko"

== Clubs ==
- Seiei High School → (Japan) Hitachi Sawa Rivale (2005–2007) → (France) RC Cannes (2007–2009) → (Japan) NEC Red Rockets (2009-2012) → (Azerbaijan) Baki-Azeryol (2012-)

== National team ==
- 2005 (Japan) Junior National team
- 2006 (Japan) World Grand Prix

== Awards ==
=== Individuals ===
- 2006 12th V.League (Japan) Servereceive award
- 2007 2006-07 Women's V.Premier League Servereceive award

=== Team ===
- 2011 60th Kurowashiki All Japan Volleyball Tournament - Runner-up, with NEC Red Rockets.

=== National team ===
- 2010 World Championship - Bronze medal
