= Szu Hui-fang =

Taiwanese volleyball player (born 1984)

Personal information
- Full name: Szu Hui-fang (施惠方)
- Born: 29 January 1984 (age 42); Yunlin (?), Republic of China (Taiwan)
- Height: 1.68 m (5 ft 6 in)
- Weight: 60 kg (132 lb)
- Spike: 280 cm (110 in)
- Block: 270 cm (106 in)

Volleyball information
- Position: Libero
- Current team: National Taiwan Normal University

National team
Chinese Taipei
- Last updated: November 7, 2006

Szu Hui-fang (Chinese: 施惠方; pinyin: Shī Hùifāng, born 29 January 1984) is a Taiwanese volleyball player who currently plays as the libero in the Chinese Taipei women's national volleyball team.

Szu started to play volleyball at the age of 10 and had played as an attacker for years. Because of her rich experience and well performance in defense, she became the libero in 2006 FIVB Women's World Championship, in which she was ranked the best digger.

== Clubs ==
- (Chinese Taipei) Bei Chen Elementary School, Yunlin County
- (Chinese Taipei) Da Liao Junior High School, Kaohsiung County (now in Kaohsiung City)
- (Chinese Taipei) Chung Shan (2004-2005)
- (Chinese Taipei) National Taiwan Normal University

== Awards ==
=== Individuals ===
- 2005 Asian Club Championship "Best Setter"

=== National team ===
- World University Games
  - Winner: 2005
  - Runner-up: 2003

=== Clubs ===
- 2005 Asian Club Championship - Runner-Up, with Chung Shan
