= Ai Ōtomo =

Japanese retired volleyball player (born 1982)

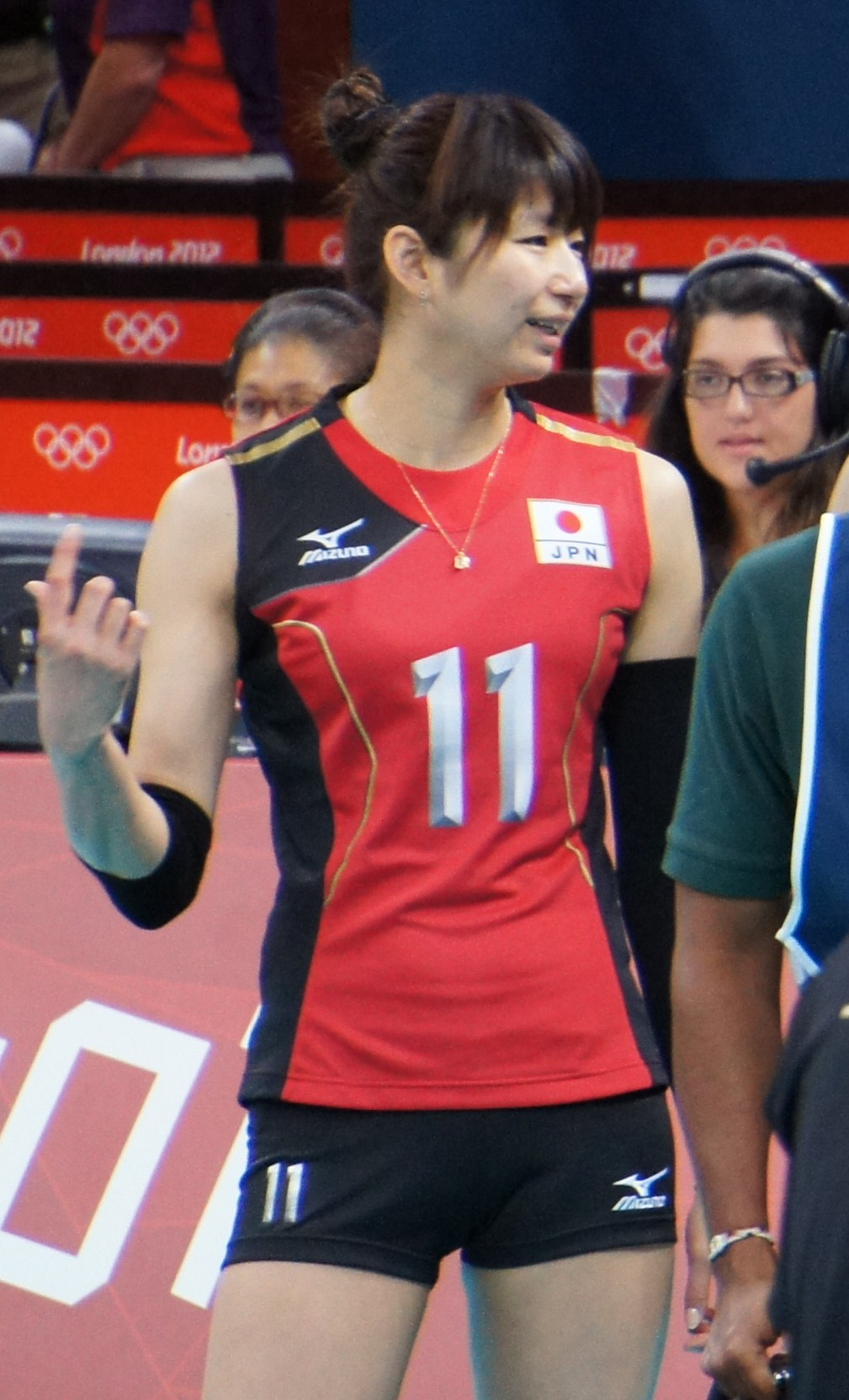
- Ōtomo in 2012

Personal information
- Full name: Ai Ōtomo
- Nickname: You
- Born: March 24, 1982 (age 44); Sendai, Miyagi, Japan
- Height: 184 cm (6 ft 0 in)
- Weight: 68 kg (150 lb)
- Spike: 312 cm (123 in)
- Block: 305 cm (120 in)

Volleyball information
- Position: Middle Blocker

National team
| Japan |
Medal record
Women's volleyball
Representing Japan
Olympic Games
| Bronze medal – third place | 2012 London | Team |
World Championship
| Bronze medal – third place | 2010 Japan | Team |
World Grand Champions Cup
| Bronze medal – third place | 2001 Japan | Team |

Ai Akimoto (秋本 愛, Akimoto Ai; née Ōtomo (大友); born March 24, 1982) is a Japanese retired volleyball player. She competed at the 2004 and 2012 Summer Olympics.

== Career ==
Ōtomo competed at the 2004 Summer Olympics in Athens, Greece, wearing the number #13 jersey. She took fifth place with the Japan women's national team. She played as a middle-blocker.

In 2008, Hisamitsu Springs announced that Ōtomo would return to active duty.

In 2009, Ōtomo played for JT Marvelous.

In September 2011, due to a right knee injury, Japan Volleyball Association announced that Ōtomo would not play in the World Cup.

At the 2012 Summer Olympics, Ōtomo was part of the Japanese team that won the bronze medal in indoor women's volleyball.

In April 2013 JT Marvelous announced Ōtomo's retirement.

== Personal life ==
On January 16, 2006, Ōtomo, who was two months pregnant at the time, married professional beach volleyball player Tatsuo Yamamoto. She announced that she had divorced Yamamoto in March 2012.

On August 8, 2013, Ōtomo announced her remarriage to Hiroyuki Akimoto, who is a judoka. The couple has four children; her eldest daughter from her previous marriage is professional volleyball player Miku Akimoto.

== Clubs ==
- SendaiIkuei High School
- NEC Red Rockets (2000–2006)
- Hisamitsu Springs (2008–2009)
- JT Marvelous (2009–2013)

== Awards ==
=== Individual ===
- 1999 Asian Youth Championship – Best server award
- 2000 Asian Junior Championship – Server award
- 2001 2000–01 V.Premier League – New face award
- 2002 51st Kurowashiki All Japan Volleyball Championship – Best6
- 2005 54th Kurowashiki All Japan Volleyball Championship – Best6
- 2009 58th Kurowashiki All Japan Volleyball Tournament – Best6
- 2010 2009–10 V.Premier League – Best 6
- 2010 59th Kurowashiki All Japan Volleyball Tournament – Best6
- 2011 2010–11 V.Premier League – Best 6
- 2011 60th Kurowashiki All Japan Volleyball Tournament – MVP, Best6
- 2013 62nd Kurowashiki All Japan Volleyball Tournament – Best 6

=== Team ===
- 2001 Kurowashiki All Japan Volleyball Championship – Champion, with NEC Red Rockets
- 2002 8th V.League – Runner-Up, with NEC Red Rockets
- 2003 9th V.League – Champion, with NEC Red Rockets
- 2004 10th V.League – Champion, with NEC Red Rockets
- 2008–09 V.Premier League – Runner-Up, with Hisamitsu Springs
- 2009 58th Kurowashiki All Japan Volleyball Tournament – Runner-Up, with Hisamistu Springa
- 2009–10 V.Premier League – Runner-Up, with JT Marvelous
- 2010 59th Kurowashiki All Japan Volleyball Tournament – Runner-Up, with JT Marvelous
- 2010–11 V.Premier League – Champion, with JT Marvelous
- 2011 60th Kurowashiki All Japan Volleyball Tournament – Champion, with JT Marvelous

=== National team ===
==== Senior team ====
- 2002 World Championship – 13th place
- 2004 Summer Olympics – 5th place
- 2010 World Championship – Bronze medal
- 2011 Montreux Volley Masters – Champion
- 2012: Bronze Medal in the Olympic Games of London

==== Junior team ====
- 2000 World Youth Championship – Champion
