= Natalya Zhukova (volleyball) =

Kazakhstani volleyball player (born 1980)

Personal information
- Nationality: Kazakhstani
- Born: 29 March 1980 (age 46) Alma-Ata, Kazakh SSR, Soviet Union

Sport
- Sport: Volleyball

Natalya Zhukova (born 29 March 1980) is a Kazakhstani volleyball player. She competed in the women's tournament at the 2008 Summer Olympics.
