= Sachiko Sugiyama =

Japanese volleyball player

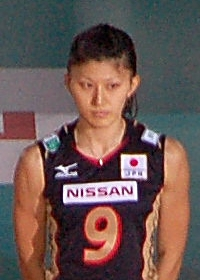

Personal information
- Nickname: Sugi
- Born: October 19, 1979 (age 47); Oyama, Shizuoka, Japan
- Height: 1.84 m (6 ft 0 in)
- Weight: 67 kg (148 lb)
- Spike: 310 cm (122 in)
- Block: 300 cm (118 in)

Volleyball information
- Position: Middle Blocker
- Current club: NEC Red Rockets
- Number: 2

National team
Japan 2008
Medal record
Women's volleyball
Representing Japan
Asian Games
Silver medal – second place	2006 Doha	Team competition

Sachiko Sugiyama (杉山 祥子, Sugiyama Sachiko, born October 19, 1979) is a volleyball player from Japan, who competed at the 2004 Summer Olympics in Athens, Greece, wearing the number #12 jersey. There she ended up in fifth place with the Japan women's national team. Sugiyama played as a middle blocker.

== Clubs ==
- Fujimi High School → NEC Red Rockets (1998-)

== National team ==
- Japan Junior National Team (1997)
- Japan National Team (2000–2008)

== Honours ==
- Team
  - 2003: 5th place in the World Cup in Japan
  - 2004: 5th place in the Olympic Games of Athens
  - 2006: 6th place in the World Championship in Japan
  - 2007: 7th place in the World Cup in Japan
  - 2008: 5th place in the Olympic Games of Beijing
- Individual
  - 1998 5thV.League New Face award
  - 2002 8thV.League Spike award, Best6
  - 2003 9thV.League Best6
  - 2004 10thV.League Best6, Block award
  - 2006 12thV.League Best6, Block award
  - 2009 2008-09Premier League Best6, Block award
