= Xeniya Ilyuchshenko =

Kazakhstani volleyball player (born 1979)

Personal information
- Nationality: Kazakhstani
- Born: 29 May 1979 (age 47) Alma-Ata, Kazakh SSR, Soviet Union

Sport
- Sport: Volleyball

Xeniya Ilyuchshenko (Ксения Михайловна Илющенко, born 29 May 1979) is a retired Kazakhstani volleyball player. She competed in the women's tournament at the 2008 Summer Olympics.
