= Kana Oyama =

Japanese volleyball player

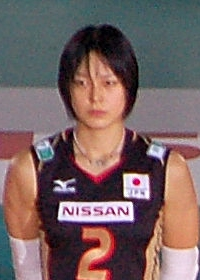

Personal information
- Full name: Kana Oyama
- Nickname: Kana
- Born: June 19, 1984 (age 42); Tokyo, Japan
- Height: 1.87 m (6 ft 2 in)
- Weight: 84 kg (185 lb)
- Spike: 313 cm (123 in)
- Block: 299 cm (118 in)

Volleyball information
- Position: Outside hitter

National team
2002-2009	Japan

Kana Oyama (大山 加奈 Ōyama Kana, born June 19, 1984) is a Japanese volleyball player who plays for Toray Arrows. She competed at the 2004 Summer Olympics in Athens, Greece wearing the #13 jersey. There, she and the Japan women's national team took fifth place. Oyama played as a wing-spiker. The Toray Arrows announced her retirement on 29 June 2010.

While attending Shimokitazawa Seito Gakuen high school, the volleyball team won the high school national championship, with Erika Araki

Oyama was selected for the national team for the Olympic games in Beijing, but declined due to lumbago.

== Personal life ==
Oyama now teaches young children how to play volleyball. Miki Oyama is her younger sister.

== Clubs ==
- (Japan) Seitoku Gakuen High School
- (Japan) Toray Arrows (2003–2010)

== Awards ==
=== Individual ===
- 2003 - 10th V.League New Face award

=== Team ===
- 2004 Kurowashiki All Japan Volleyball Championship - Champion, with Toray Arrows
- 2007 Domestic Sports Festival (Volleyball) - Champion, with Toray Arrows
- 2007-2008 Empress's Cup - Champion, with Toray Arrows
- 2007-2008 V.Premier League - Champion, with Toray Arrows
- 2008 Domestic Sports Festival - Runner-Up, with Toray Arrows
- 2008-2009 V.Premier League - Champion, with Toray Arrows
- 2009 Kurowashiki All Japan Volleyball Championship - Champion, with Toray Arrows
- 2009-2010 V.Premier League - Champion, with Toray Arrows

=== National team ===
==== Senior team ====
- 2004 - Summer Olympic games in Athens, 5th place
