= Makiko Horai =

Japanese volleyball player (born 1979)

Personal information
- Born: January 6, 1979 (age 47) Ube, Yamaguchi, Japan
Medal record
Women's volleyball
Representing Japan
Asian Games
Silver medal – second place	2006 Doha	Team competition

Makiko Horai (宝来 眞紀子, Hōrai Makiko; born January 6, 1979) is a former Japanese volleyball player.

The 6ft 2in tall Horai also played for Japan National women's volleyball team and participated at the 2006 World Championship. Her nickname is Japanese High Tower (ジャパニーズハイタワー).

== Profile ==
- Birthplace: Ube, Yamaguchi
- Height: 188 cm 6ft 2in tall

== National team ==
- 2002: 13th place in the 2002 World Championship
- 2003: 5th place in the World Cup in Japan
- 2006: 6th place in the 2006 World Championship
