= Miyuki Takahashi (volleyball) =

Japanese volleyball player

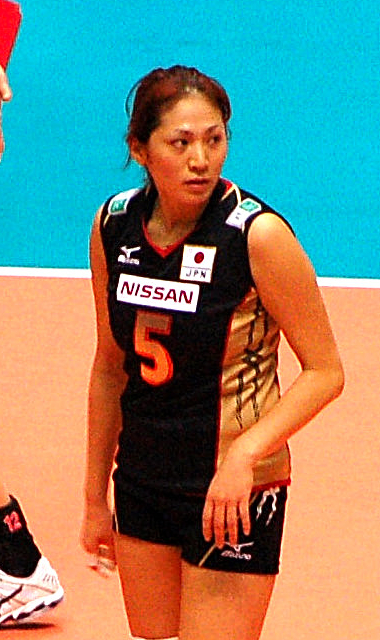

Personal information
- Full name: Miyuki Takahashi
- Nickname: SHIN
- Born: December 25, 1978 (age 47); Yamagata, Yamagata, Japan
- Hometown: kanagawa
- Height: 1.70 m (5 ft 7 in)
- Weight: 68 kg (150 lb)
- Spike: 290 cm (114 in)
- Block: 280 cm (110 in)

Volleyball information
- Position: Wing-spiker
- Current club: NEC Red Rockets
- Number: 1

National team
Japan (2000-2008)

Miyuki Takahashi (高橋 みゆき Takahashi Miyuki, born 25 December 1978) is a Japanese volleyball player, who played for the NEC Red Rockets.

Takahashi also played for the All-Japan women's volleyball team and participated at the 2004 and 2008 Summer Olympics. Her nickname is SHIN (心 Shin).

Takahashi was the captain of the Japanese volleyball team during the 2002 FIVB World Championship.

== Clubs ==
- (Japan) Yamagata Higashi Jr.
- (Japan) NEC Red Rockets (1997–2005)
- (Italy) Minetti Infoplus Vicenza (2005–2007)
- (Japan) NEC Red Rockets (2007–2009)
- (Japan) Toyota Auto Body Queenseis (2011–2012)

== National team ==
- 2001: Bronze Medal in the World Grand Champions Cup 2001
- 2002: 13th place in the World Championship 2002
- 2003: 5th place in the World Cup 2003
- 2004: 5th place in the Olympic Games of Athens
- 2006: 6th place in the World Championship 2006
- 2007: 7th place in the World Cup 2007
- 2008: 5th place in the Olympic Games of Beijing

== Individual awards ==
- 2004 Olympic Qualifier "Best Spiker"
- 2005 FIVB World Grand Prix "Best Scorer"
- Best Server (World Grand Champion Cup 2001)

Awards
Preceded by (United States) Logan Tom	World Grand Prix Best Scorer; 2005	Succeeded by (Russia) Ekaterina Gamova
