= Volleyball at the 2012 Summer Olympics – Women's team rosters =

This article shows the rosters of all participating teams at the women's indoor volleyball tournament at the 2012 Summer Olympics in London.

== Pool A ==
=== Algeria ===
The following is the Algerian roster in the women's volleyball tournament of the 2012 Summer Olympics.

Head coach: (Poland) George Strumilo

№	Name	Date of birth	Height	Weight	Spike	Block	2012 club
1	Sehryne Hennaoui	1 October 1988	1.72 m (5 ft 8 in)	69 kg (152 lb)	285 cm (112 in)	273 cm (107 in)	(France) Le Hainaut VB Women
2	Dallal Merwa Achour	3 November 1994	1.75 m (5 ft 9 in)	60 kg (130 lb)	279 cm (110 in)	273 cm (107 in)	(Algeria) ESF Mouzaia
3	Salima Hammouche (L)	17 January 1984	1.58 m (5 ft 2 in)	54 kg (119 lb)	270 cm (110 in)	265 cm (104 in)	(Algeria) GS Pétroliers
5	Amel Khamtache	4 May 1981	1.81 m (5 ft 11 in)	65 kg (143 lb)	240 cm (94 in)	235 cm (93 in)	(Algeria) GS Pétroliers
8	Zohra Bensalem	5 April 1990	1.78 m (5 ft 10 in)	68 kg (150 lb)	310 cm (120 in)	299 cm (118 in)	(Algeria) GS Pétroliers
9	Sarra Belhocine	18 September 1994	1.76 m (5 ft 9 in)	58 kg (128 lb)	272 cm (107 in)	266 cm (105 in)	(Algeria) GS Pétroliers
11	Mouni Abderrahim	19 November 1985	1.71 m (5 ft 7 in)	60 kg (130 lb)	305 cm (120 in)	293 cm (115 in)	(Algeria) ASW Bejaïa
12	Safia Boukhima	10 January 1991	1.76 m (5 ft 9 in)	64 kg (141 lb)	294 cm (116 in)	284 cm (112 in)	(Algeria) GS Pétroliers
13	Nawal Mansouri (L)	1 August 1985	1.74 m (5 ft 9 in)	64 kg (141 lb)	291 cm (115 in)	281 cm (111 in)	(Algeria) GS Pétroliers
17	Lydia Oulmou (c)	2 February 1986	1.86 m (6 ft 1 in)	74 kg (163 lb)	310 cm (120 in)	305 cm (120 in)	(France) Istres Volleyball
18	Tassadit Aïssou	19 June 1989	1.84 m (6 ft 0 in)	80 kg (180 lb)	295 cm (116 in)	285 cm (112 in)	(Algeria) Nedjmet Chlef
19	Celia Bourihane	22 January 1995	1.77 m (5 ft 10 in)	60 kg (130 lb)	295 cm (116 in)	289 cm (114 in)	(Algeria) NC Bejaïa

=== Dominican Republic ===
The following is the Dominican roster in the women's volleyball tournament of the 2012 Summer Olympics.

Head coach: (Brazil) Marcos Kwiek

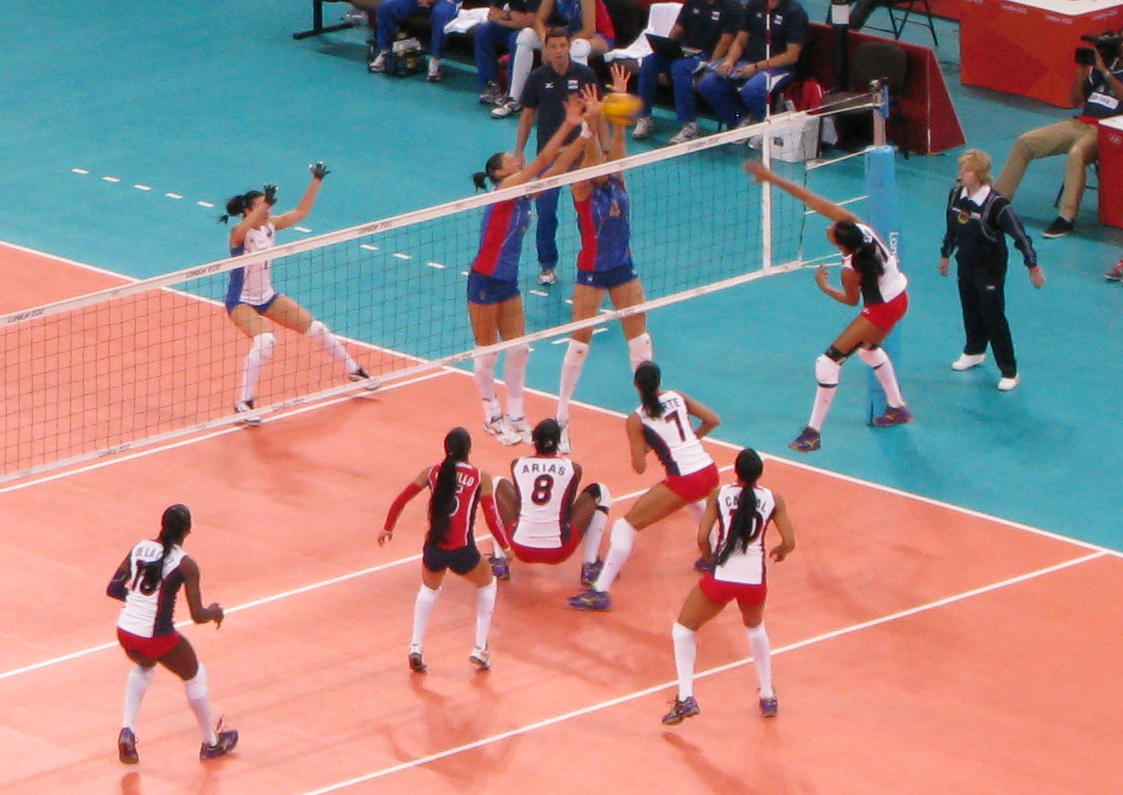
Russia and Dominican Republic women's volleyball teams at the 2012 London Olympics

№	Name	Date of birth	Height	Weight	Spike	Block	2012 club
1	Annerys Vargas	7 August 1981	1.96 m (6 ft 5 in)	70 kg (150 lb)	327 cm (129 in)	320 cm (130 in)	(Puerto Rico) Criollas de Caguas
3	Lisvel Elisa Eve	10 September 1991	1.94 m (6 ft 4 in)	70 kg (150 lb)	325 cm (128 in)	315 cm (124 in)	(Dominican Republic) Mirador Volleyball
5	Brenda Castillo (L)	5 June 1992	1.67 m (5 ft 6 in)	55 kg (121 lb)	245 cm (96 in)	230 cm (91 in)	(Dominican Republic) San Cristóbal
7	Niverka Marte	19 October 1990	1.78 m (5 ft 10 in)	71 kg (157 lb)	295 cm (116 in)	283 cm (111 in)	(Dominican Republic) Deportivo Nacional
8	Cándida Arias	11 March 1992	1.94 m (6 ft 4 in)	68 kg (150 lb)	320 cm (130 in)	315 cm (124 in)	(Dominican Republic) San Cristóbal
9	Sidarka Núñez	25 June 1984	1.85 m (6 ft 1 in)	62 kg (137 lb)	330 cm (130 in)	320 cm (130 in)	(Dominican Republic) Club Malanga
10	Milagros Cabral (c)	17 October 1978	1.82 m (6 ft 0 in)	63 kg (139 lb)	325 cm (128 in)	320 cm (130 in)	(Dominican Republic) Los Cachorros
12	Karla Echenique	16 May 1986	1.80 m (5 ft 11 in)	65 kg (143 lb)	300 cm (120 in)	290 cm (110 in)	(Dominican Republic) Deportivo Nacional
13	Cindy Rondón	12 November 1987	1.86 m (6 ft 1 in)	61 kg (134 lb)	320 cm (130 in)	315 cm (124 in)	(Dominican Republic) Mirador Volleyball
14	Prisilla Rivera	29 December 1984	1.86 m (6 ft 1 in)	70 kg (150 lb)	320 cm (130 in)	315 cm (124 in)	(Dominican Republic) San Pedro
17	Gina Mambrú	21 January 1986	1.82 m (6 ft 0 in)	65 kg (143 lb)	330 cm (130 in)	315 cm (124 in)	(Dominican Republic) Los Cachorros
18	Bethania de la Cruz	13 May 1987	1.88 m (6 ft 2 in)	70 kg (150 lb)	330 cm (130 in)	320 cm (130 in)	(Dominican Republic) Deportivo Nacional

=== Great Britain ===
The following is the British roster in the women's volleyball tournament of the 2012 Summer Olympics.

Head coach: Audrey Cooper

№	Name	Date of birth	Height	Weight	Spike	Block	2012 club
1	Savanah Leaf	24 November 1993	1.83 m (6 ft 0 in)	68 kg (150 lb)	316 cm (124 in)	289 cm (114 in)	(United States) University of Miami
2	Lucy Wicks	20 March 1982	1.73 m (5 ft 8 in)	60 kg (130 lb)	285 cm (112 in)	274 cm (108 in)	(Germany) Alemannia Aachen
4	Rachel Laybourne	23 May 1982	1.78 m (5 ft 10 in)	65 kg (143 lb)	299 cm (118 in)	279 cm (110 in)	(Poland) Silesia Volley Myslowice
6	Jennifer Taylor	16 August 1980	1.79 m (5 ft 10 in)	74 kg (163 lb)	287 cm (113 in)	278 cm (109 in)	(Netherlands) TFM/DOK Dwingeloo
7	Maria Bertelli (L)	6 October 1977	1.71 m (5 ft 7 in)	64 kg (141 lb)	279 cm (110 in)	263 cm (104 in)	(Switzerland) VBC Köniz
8	Rachel Bragg	11 December 1984	1.85 m (6 ft 1 in)	74 kg (163 lb)	300 cm (120 in)	283 cm (111 in)	(Germany) VT Aurubis Hamburg
9	Joanne Morgan	7 October 1983	1.68 m (5 ft 6 in)	62 kg (137 lb)	278 cm (109 in)	271 cm (107 in)	(Netherlands) TFM/DOK Dwingeloo
10	Lynne Beattie (c)	23 December 1985	1.82 m (6 ft 0 in)	64 kg (141 lb)	305 cm (120 in)	287 cm (113 in)	(Spain) CV Las Palmas
12	Elizabeth Reid	21 March 1989	1.80 m (5 ft 11 in)	76 kg (168 lb)	314 cm (124 in)	300 cm (120 in)	(United States) University of Georgia
17	Janine Sandell	7 December 1985	1.80 m (5 ft 11 in)	84 kg (185 lb)	305 cm (120 in)	283 cm (111 in)	(Spain) CV Albacete
18	Grace Carter	10 August 1989	1.83 m (6 ft 0 in)	84 kg (185 lb)	304 cm (120 in)	291 cm (115 in)	(France) Olympic Terville Florange
19	Ciara Michel	2 July 1985	1.95 m (6 ft 5 in)	70 kg (150 lb)	320 cm (130 in)	302 cm (119 in)	(Germany) Alemannia Aachen

=== Italy ===
The following is the Italian roster in the women's volleyball tournament of the 2012 Summer Olympics.

Head coach: Massimo Barbolini

№	Name	Date of birth	Height	Weight	Spike	Block	2012 club
3	Paola Croce	6 March 1978	1.67 m (5 ft 6 in)	52 kg (115 lb)	290 cm (110 in)	265 cm (104 in)	(Italy) Liu·Jo Modena
5	Giulia Rondon	16 October 1987	1.89 m (6 ft 2 in)	74 kg (163 lb)	304 cm (120 in)	280 cm (110 in)	(Italy) ICOS Crema
6	Monica De Gennaro (L)	8 January 1987	1.74 m (5 ft 9 in)	67 kg (148 lb)	292 cm (115 in)	270 cm (110 in)	(Italy) Scavolini Pesaro
8	Jenny Barazza	24 July 1981	1.88 m (6 ft 2 in)	77 kg (170 lb)	300 cm (120 in)	285 cm (112 in)	(Italy) Liu·Jo Modena
9	Caterina Bosetti	2 February 1994	1.79 m (5 ft 10 in)	59 kg (130 lb)	299 cm (118 in)	281 cm (111 in)	(Italy) MC-Carnaghi Villa Cortese
12	Francesca Piccinini	10 January 1979	1.84 m (6 ft 0 in)	71 kg (157 lb)	304 cm (120 in)	279 cm (110 in)	(Italy) Norda Foppapedretti Bergamo
13	Valentina Arrighetti	26 January 1985	1.85 m (6 ft 1 in)	72 kg (159 lb)	294 cm (116 in)	280 cm (110 in)	(Italy) Norda Foppapedretti Bergamo
14	Eleonora Lo Bianco (c)	22 December 1979	1.71 m (5 ft 7 in)	67 kg (148 lb)	287 cm (113 in)	273 cm (107 in)	(Turkey) Galatasaray
15	Antonella Del Core	5 November 1980	1.80 m (5 ft 11 in)	70 kg (150 lb)	296 cm (117 in)	279 cm (110 in)	(Russia) Fakel Novy Urengoy
16	Lucia Bosetti	9 July 1989	1.75 m (5 ft 9 in)	65 kg (143 lb)	306 cm (120 in)	286 cm (113 in)	(Italy) MC-Carnaghi Villa Cortese
17	Simona Gioli	17 September 1977	1.85 m (6 ft 1 in)	70 kg (150 lb)	307 cm (121 in)	283 cm (111 in)	(Russia) Fakel Novy Urengoy
18	Carolina Costagrande	15 October 1980	1.88 m (6 ft 2 in)	80 kg (180 lb)	312 cm (123 in)	291 cm (115 in)	(China) Guangdong Evergrande

=== Japan ===
The following is the Japanese roster in the women's volleyball tournament of the 2012 Summer Olympics.

Head coach: Masayoshi Manabe

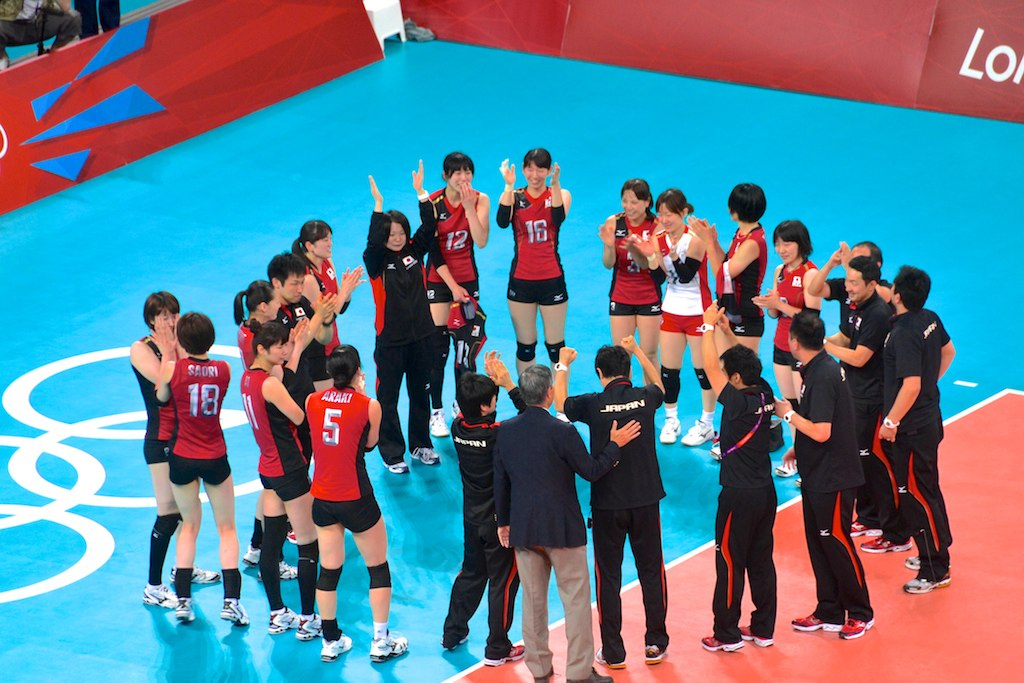
The Japanese team after winning the bronze medal

№	Name	Date of birth	Height	Weight	Spike	Block	2012 club
2	Hitomi Nakamichi	18 September 1985	1.59 m (5 ft 3 in)	53 kg (117 lb)	270 cm (110 in)	256 cm (101 in)	(Japan) Toray Arrows
3	Yoshie Takeshita	18 March 1978	1.59 m (5 ft 3 in)	53 kg (117 lb)	280 cm (110 in)	270 cm (110 in)	(Japan) JT Marvelous
4	Mai Yamaguchi	3 July 1983	1.76 m (5 ft 9 in)	62 kg (137 lb)	302 cm (119 in)	290 cm (110 in)	(Japan) Okayama Seagulls
5	Erika Araki (c)	3 August 1984	1.86 m (6 ft 1 in)	80 kg (180 lb)	308 cm (121 in)	298 cm (117 in)	(Japan) Toray Arrows
7	Kaori Inoue	21 October 1982	1.82 m (6 ft 0 in)	59 kg (130 lb)	306 cm (120 in)	300 cm (120 in)	(Japan) Denso Airybees
8	Maiko Kano	15 July 1988	1.85 m (6 ft 1 in)	72 kg (159 lb)	303 cm (119 in)	285 cm (112 in)	(Turkey) Beşiktaş
10	Yuko Sano (L)	26 July 1979	1.59 m (5 ft 3 in)	63 kg (139 lb)	260 cm (100 in)	250 cm (98 in)	(Azerbaijan) Igtisadchi Baku
11	Ai Ōtomo	24 March 1982	1.84 m (6 ft 0 in)	68 kg (150 lb)	312 cm (123 in)	305 cm (120 in)	(Japan) JT Marvelous
12	Risa Shinnabe	11 July 1990	1.73 m (5 ft 8 in)	66 kg (146 lb)	295 cm (116 in)	268 cm (106 in)	(Japan) Hisamitsu Springs
14	Saori Sakoda	18 December 1987	1.75 m (5 ft 9 in)	64 kg (141 lb)	305 cm (120 in)	279 cm (110 in)	(Japan) Toray Arrows
16	Yukiko Ebata	7 November 1989	1.76 m (5 ft 9 in)	70 kg (150 lb)	305 cm (120 in)	293 cm (115 in)	(Japan) Hitachi Rivale
18	Saori Kimura	19 August 1986	1.85 m (6 ft 1 in)	65 kg (143 lb)	304 cm (120 in)	293 cm (115 in)	(Turkey) VakıfBank Türk Telekom

=== Russia ===
The following is the Russian roster in the women's volleyball tournament of the 2012 Summer Olympics.

Head coach: Sergey Ovchinnikov

№	Name	Date of birth	Height	Weight	Spike	Block	2012 club
1	Maria Borisenko (c)	8 March 1986	1.90 m (6 ft 3 in)	80 kg (180 lb)	301 cm (119 in)	297 cm (117 in)	(Russia) Dynamo Kazan
3	Maria Perepelkina	9 March 1984	1.86 m (6 ft 1 in)	72 kg (159 lb)	304 cm (120 in)	300 cm (120 in)	(Russia) Dynamo Moscow
4	Evgenia Estes	17 July 1975	1.91 m (6 ft 3 in)	75 kg (165 lb)	315 cm (124 in)	306 cm (120 in)	(Russia) Uralochka-NTMK
5	Lioubov Sokolova	4 December 1977	1.92 m (6 ft 4 in)	74 kg (163 lb)	310 cm (120 in)	304 cm (120 in)	(Turkey) Fenerbahçe
6	Anna Matienko	12 July 1981	1.82 m (6 ft 0 in)	68 kg (150 lb)	298 cm (117 in)	292 cm (115 in)	(Russia) Dynamo Moscow
7	Svetlana Kryuchkova (L)	21 February 1985	1.74 m (5 ft 9 in)	63 kg (139 lb)	290 cm (110 in)	286 cm (113 in)	(Russia) Dynamo Moscow
8	Nataliya Obmochaeva	1 June 1989	1.95 m (6 ft 5 in)	75 kg (165 lb)	315 cm (124 in)	306 cm (120 in)	(Russia) Dynamo Moscow
11	Yekaterina Gamova	17 October 1980	2.04 m (6 ft 8 in)	80 kg (180 lb)	321 cm (126 in)	310 cm (120 in)	(Russia) Dynamo Kazan
13	Yevgeniya Startseva	12 February 1989	1.84 m (6 ft 0 in)	68 kg (150 lb)	294 cm (116 in)	290 cm (110 in)	(Russia) Dinamo Krasnodar
14	Ekaterina Ulanova	5 August 1986	1.72 m (5 ft 8 in)	61 kg (134 lb)	298 cm (117 in)	290 cm (110 in)	(Russia) Dynamo Kazan
15	Tatiana Kosheleva	23 December 1988	1.91 m (6 ft 3 in)	67 kg (148 lb)	315 cm (124 in)	305 cm (120 in)	(Russia) Dinamo Krasnodar
16	Yulia Merkulova	17 February 1984	2.02 m (6 ft 8 in)	75 kg (165 lb)	317 cm (125 in)	308 cm (121 in)	(Russia) Dynamo Moscow

== Pool B ==
=== Brazil ===
The following is the Brazilian roster in the women's volleyball tournament of the 2012 Summer Olympics.

Head coach: José Roberto Guimarães

№	Name	Date of birth	Height	Weight	Spike	Block	2012 club
1	Fabiana Claudino (c)	24 January 1985	1.94 m (6 ft 4 in)	76 kg (168 lb)	314 cm (124 in)	293 cm (115 in)	(Turkey) Fenerbahçe
3	Dani Lins	5 January 1985	1.82 m (6 ft 0 in)	68 kg (150 lb)	290 cm (110 in)	276 cm (109 in)	(Brazil) SESI São Paulo
4	Paula Pequeno	22 January 1982	1.84 m (6 ft 0 in)	74 kg (163 lb)	302 cm (119 in)	285 cm (112 in)	(Brazil) Vôlei Futuro
5	Adenízia da Silva	18 December 1986	1.86 m (6 ft 1 in)	63 kg (139 lb)	312 cm (123 in)	290 cm (110 in)	(Brazil) Sollys/Osasco
6	Thaísa Menezes	15 May 1987	1.96 m (6 ft 5 in)	79 kg (174 lb)	316 cm (124 in)	301 cm (119 in)	(Brazil) Sollys/Osasco
8	Jaqueline Carvalho	31 December 1983	1.86 m (6 ft 1 in)	70 kg (150 lb)	302 cm (119 in)	286 cm (113 in)	(Brazil) Sollys/Osasco
9	Fernanda Ferreira	10 January 1980	1.72 m (5 ft 8 in)	66 kg (146 lb)	283 cm (111 in)	264 cm (104 in)	(Azerbaijan) Igtisadchi Baku
11	Tandara Caixeta	30 October 1988	1.85 m (6 ft 1 in)	87 kg (192 lb)	295 cm (116 in)	285 cm (112 in)	(Brazil) Sollys/Osasco
12	Natália Pereira	4 April 1989	1.86 m (6 ft 1 in)	76 kg (168 lb)	300 cm (120 in)	288 cm (113 in)	(Brazil) Unilever
13	Sheilla Castro	1 July 1983	1.86 m (6 ft 1 in)	64 kg (141 lb)	302 cm (119 in)	284 cm (112 in)	(Brazil) Unilever
14	Fabiana de Oliveira (L)	7 March 1980	1.67 m (5 ft 6 in)	59 kg (130 lb)	276 cm (109 in)	266 cm (105 in)	(Brazil) Unilever
16	Fernanda Garay	10 May 1986	1.81 m (5 ft 11 in)	74 kg (163 lb)	308 cm (121 in)	288 cm (113 in)	(Brazil) Vôlei Futuro

=== China ===
The following is the Chinese roster in the women's volleyball tournament of the 2012 Summer Olympics.

Head coach: Yu Juemin

№	Name	Date of birth	Height	Weight	Spike	Block	2012 club
1	Wang Yimei	11 January 1988	1.90 m (6 ft 3 in)	90 kg (200 lb)	318 cm (125 in)	305 cm (120 in)	(China) Liaoning
2	Mi Yang	24 January 1989	1.80 m (5 ft 11 in)	70 kg (150 lb)	305 cm (120 in)	298 cm (117 in)	(China) Tianjin
4	Hui Ruoqi	4 March 1991	1.89 m (6 ft 2 in)	70 kg (150 lb)	312 cm (123 in)	305 cm (120 in)	(China) Jiangsu
6	Chu Jinling	29 July 1984	1.90 m (6 ft 3 in)	72 kg (159 lb)	310 cm (120 in)	302 cm (119 in)	(China) Liaoning
7	Zhang Xian (L)	16 March 1985	1.67 m (5 ft 6 in)	57 kg (126 lb)	290 cm (110 in)	280 cm (110 in)	(China) Liaoning
8	Wei Qiuyue (c)	26 September 1988	1.82 m (6 ft 0 in)	65 kg (143 lb)	305 cm (120 in)	300 cm (120 in)	(China) Tianjin
9	Yang Junjing	15 May 1989	1.90 m (6 ft 3 in)	70 kg (150 lb)	308 cm (121 in)	300 cm (120 in)	(China) Bayi
10	Shan Danna	8 October 1991	1.68 m (5 ft 6 in)	60 kg (130 lb)	295 cm (116 in)	285 cm (112 in)	(China) Zhejiang
11	Xu Yunli	2 August 1987	1.96 m (6 ft 5 in)	75 kg (165 lb)	317 cm (125 in)	315 cm (124 in)	(China) Fujian
12	Zeng Chunlei	3 November 1989	1.86 m (6 ft 1 in)	77 kg (170 lb)	318 cm (125 in)	315 cm (124 in)	(China) Beijing
15	Ma Yunwen	19 October 1986	1.89 m (6 ft 2 in)	76 kg (168 lb)	315 cm (124 in)	307 cm (121 in)	(China) Shanghai
17	Zhang Lei	11 January 1985	1.81 m (5 ft 11 in)	71 kg (157 lb)	315 cm (124 in)	310 cm (120 in)	(China) Shanghai

=== Serbia ===
The following is the Serbian roster in the women's volleyball tournament of the 2012 Summer Olympics.

Head coach: Zoran Terzić

№	Name	Date of birth	Height	Weight	Spike	Block	2012 club
2	Jovana Brakočević	5 March 1988	1.96 m (6 ft 5 in)	82 kg (181 lb)	309 cm (122 in)	295 cm (116 in)	(Japan) JT Marvelous
3	Ivana Đerisilo	8 August 1983	1.88 m (6 ft 2 in)	68 kg (150 lb)	277 cm (109 in)	252 cm (99 in)	(Italy) Urbino Volley
4	Bojana Živković	29 March 1988	1.85 m (6 ft 1 in)	70 kg (150 lb)	292 cm (115 in)	284 cm (112 in)	(Switzerland) Volero Zurich
5	Nataša Krsmanović	19 June 1985	1.88 m (6 ft 2 in)	73 kg (161 lb)	294 cm (116 in)	273 cm (107 in)	(Azerbaijan) Rabita Baku
7	Brankica Mihajlović	13 April 1991	1.89 m (6 ft 2 in)	64 kg (141 lb)	282 cm (111 in)	264 cm (104 in)	(Switzerland) Volero Zurich
9	Jovana Vesović	21 June 1987	1.82 m (6 ft 0 in)	68 kg (150 lb)	283 cm (111 in)	268 cm (106 in)	(Romania) Tomis Constanţa
10	Maja Ognjenović (c)	6 August 1984	1.83 m (6 ft 0 in)	68 kg (150 lb)	290 cm (110 in)	270 cm (110 in)	(Italy) Liu Jo Volley Modena
11	Stefana Veljković	9 January 1990	1.90 m (6 ft 3 in)	76 kg (168 lb)	320 cm (130 in)	305 cm (120 in)	(Italy) Asystel Novara
16	Milena Rašić	25 October 1990	1.93 m (6 ft 4 in)	75 kg (165 lb)	303 cm (119 in)	293 cm (115 in)	(France) RC Cannes
18	Suzana Ćebić (L)	11 September 1984	1.67 m (5 ft 6 in)	60 kg (130 lb)	279 cm (110 in)	255 cm (100 in)	(Germany) VfB 91 Suhl
19	Sanja Starović	25 March 1983	1.95 m (6 ft 5 in)	89 kg (196 lb)	317 cm (125 in)	304 cm (120 in)	(Azerbaijan) Rabita Baku
20	Jelena Blagojević	1 December 1988	1.81 m (5 ft 11 in)	68 kg (150 lb)	267 cm (105 in)	242 cm (95 in)	(Italy) Volley Urbino

=== South Korea ===
The following is the Korean roster in the women's volleyball tournament of the 2012 Summer Olympics.

Head coach: Kim Hyung-sil

№	Name	Date of birth	Height	Weight	Spike	Block	2012 club
3	Ha Yu-jeong	26 December 1989	1.89 m (6 ft 2 in)	74 kg (163 lb)	287 cm (113 in)	281 cm (111 in)	(South Korea) Korea Expressway Corporation
4	Kim Sa-nee (c)	21 June 1981	1.80 m (5 ft 11 in)	75 kg (165 lb)	302 cm (119 in)	292 cm (115 in)	(South Korea) Heungkuk Life
5	Kim Hae-ran (L)	16 March 1984	1.68 m (5 ft 6 in)	60 kg (130 lb)	280 cm (110 in)	270 cm (110 in)	(South Korea) Korea Expressway Corporation
7	Lim Hyo-sook	26 April 1982	1.77 m (5 ft 10 in)	75 kg (165 lb)	278 cm (109 in)	270 cm (110 in)	(South Korea) Korea Expressway Corporation
10	Kim Yeon-koung	26 February 1988	1.92 m (6 ft 4 in)	73 kg (161 lb)	307 cm (121 in)	299 cm (118 in)	(Turkey) Fenerbahçe
11	Han Yoo-mi	5 February 1982	1.80 m (5 ft 11 in)	65 kg (143 lb)	307 cm (121 in)	297 cm (117 in)	(South Korea) Korea Ginseng Corporation
12	Han Song-yi	5 September 1984	1.86 m (6 ft 1 in)	65 kg (143 lb)	305 cm (120 in)	298 cm (117 in)	(South Korea) GS Caltex
13	Jung Dae-young	12 August 1981	1.83 m (6 ft 0 in)	71 kg (157 lb)	303 cm (119 in)	292 cm (115 in)	(South Korea) GS Caltex
14	Hwang Youn-joo	13 August 1986	1.77 m (5 ft 10 in)	68 kg (150 lb)	303 cm (119 in)	294 cm (116 in)	(South Korea) Hyundai E&C
17	Yang Hyo-jin	14 December 1989	1.90 m (6 ft 3 in)	72 kg (159 lb)	287 cm (113 in)	280 cm (110 in)	(South Korea) Hyundai E&C
19	Kim Hee-jin	29 April 1991	1.85 m (6 ft 1 in)	77 kg (170 lb)	300 cm (120 in)	295 cm (116 in)	(South Korea) IBK Altos
20	Lee Sook-ja	17 June 1980	1.75 m (5 ft 9 in)	58 kg (128 lb)	286 cm (113 in)	264 cm (104 in)	(South Korea) GS Caltex

=== Turkey ===
The following is the Turkish roster in the women's volleyball tournament of the 2012 Summer Olympics.

Head coach: (Brazil) Marco Aurelio Motta

№	Name	Date of birth	Height	Weight	Spike	Block	2012 club
2	Gülden Kayalar (L)	5 December 1980	1.67 m (5 ft 6 in)	57 kg (126 lb)	281 cm (111 in)	275 cm (108 in)	(Turkey) Eczacıbaşı
3	Gizem Güreşen (L)	14 January 1987	1.78 m (5 ft 10 in)	70 kg (150 lb)	250 cm (98 in)	270 cm (110 in)	(Turkey) VakıfBank
6	Polen Uslupehlivan	27 August 1990	1.91 m (6 ft 3 in)	65 kg (143 lb)	308 cm (121 in)	300 cm (120 in)	(Turkey) Nilüfer Belediyespor
8	Bahar Toksoy	6 February 1988	1.88 m (6 ft 2 in)	68 kg (150 lb)	315 cm (124 in)	305 cm (120 in)	(Turkey) VakıfBank
9	Özge Kırdar	26 June 1985	1.78 m (5 ft 10 in)	70 kg (150 lb)	310 cm (120 in)	300 cm (120 in)	(Turkey) VakıfBank
10	Gözde Kırdar	26 June 1985	1.81 m (5 ft 11 in)	70 kg (150 lb)	297 cm (117 in)	292 cm (115 in)	(Turkey) VakıfBank
11	Naz Aydemir	14 August 1990	1.82 m (6 ft 0 in)	68 kg (150 lb)	304 cm (120 in)	300 cm (120 in)	(Turkey) Fenerbahçe
12	Esra Gümüş (c)	2 October 1982	1.78 m (5 ft 10 in)	76 kg (168 lb)	305 cm (120 in)	297 cm (117 in)	(Turkey) Eczacıbaşı
13	Neriman Özsoy	13 July 1988	1.84 m (6 ft 0 in)	76 kg (168 lb)	310 cm (120 in)	291 cm (115 in)	(Russia) Dinamo Krasnodar
14	Eda Erdem	22 June 1987	1.88 m (6 ft 2 in)	75 kg (165 lb)	308 cm (121 in)	302 cm (119 in)	(Turkey) Fenerbahçe
17	Neslihan Demir Darnel	9 December 1983	1.85 m (6 ft 1 in)	72 kg (159 lb)	315 cm (124 in)	306 cm (120 in)	(Turkey) Eczacıbaşı
20	Büşra Cansu	16 July 1990	1.85 m (6 ft 1 in)	80 kg (180 lb)	296 cm (117 in)	285 cm (112 in)	(Turkey) Eczacıbaşı

=== United States ===
The following is the American roster in the women's volleyball tournament of the 2012 Summer Olympics.

Head coach: (New Zealand) Hugh McCutcheon

№	Name	Date of birth	Height	Weight	Spike	Block	2012 club
2	Danielle Scott-Arruda	1 October 1972	1.88 m (6 ft 2 in)	84 kg (185 lb)	325 cm (128 in)	302 cm (119 in)	(Brazil) Cultural Metodista
3	Tayyiba Haneef-Park	23 March 1979	2.00 m (6 ft 7 in)	82 kg (181 lb)	328 cm (129 in)	312 cm (123 in)	(Azerbaijan) Igtisadchi Baku
4	Lindsey Berg (c)	16 July 1980	1.73 m (5 ft 8 in)	75 kg (165 lb)	287 cm (113 in)	274 cm (108 in)	(Italy) Villa Cortese
5	Tamari Miyashiro	8 July 1987	1.70 m (5 ft 7 in)	70 kg (150 lb)	284 cm (112 in)	266 cm (105 in)	(Poland) Bielsko-Biała
6	Nicole Davis (L)	24 April 1982	1.67 m (5 ft 6 in)	73 kg (161 lb)	284 cm (112 in)	266 cm (105 in)	(Italy) River Volley
10	Jordan Larson	16 October 1986	1.87 m (6 ft 2 in)	75 kg (165 lb)	302 cm (119 in)	295 cm (116 in)	(Russia) Dynamo Kazan
11	Megan Hodge	15 October 1988	1.87 m (6 ft 2 in)	80 kg (180 lb)	320 cm (130 in)	297 cm (117 in)	(Poland) Atom Trefl Sopot
13	Christa Harmotto	12 October 1986	1.87 m (6 ft 2 in)	79 kg (174 lb)	322 cm (127 in)	300 cm (120 in)	(Italy) Pallavolo Modena
15	Logan Tom	25 May 1981	1.84 m (6 ft 0 in)	80 kg (180 lb)	306 cm (120 in)	297 cm (117 in)	(Turkey) Fenerbahçe
16	Foluke Akinradewo	5 October 1987	1.88 m (6 ft 2 in)	79 kg (174 lb)	331 cm (130 in)	300 cm (120 in)	(Russia) Dinamo Krasnodar
17	Courtney Thompson	4 November 1984	1.70 m (5 ft 7 in)	66 kg (146 lb)	276 cm (109 in)	263 cm (104 in)	(Puerto Rico) Lancheras de Cataño
19	Destinee Hooker	7 September 1987	1.91 m (6 ft 3 in)	73 kg (161 lb)	320 cm (130 in)	304 cm (120 in)	(Brazil) Sollys/Osasco

== See also ==
- Volleyball at the 2012 Summer Olympics – Men's team rosters
