= Thailand women's national volleyball team results (2010–2019) =

This article lists the results for the Thailand women's national volleyball team between 2010 and 2019.

== 2010 ==
Date	Competition	Location	Opponent	Result
6 August 2010	2010 World Grand Prix	China	Netherlands	0–3 L
7 August 2010	2010 World Grand Prix	China	China	0–3 L
8 August 2010	2010 World Grand Prix	China	Puerto Rico	0–3 L
13 August 2010	2010 World Grand Prix	Thailand	Puerto Rico	3–1 W
14 August 2010	2010 World Grand Prix	Thailand	United States	0–3 L
15 August 2010	2010 World Grand Prix	Thailand	Italy	1–3 L
20 August 2010	2010 World Grand Prix	Hong Kong	China	1–3 L
21 August 2010	2010 World Grand Prix	Hong Kong	United States	0–3 L
22 August 2010	2010 World Grand Prix	Hong Kong	Germany	1–3 L
19 September 2010	2010 Asian Cup Championship	China	Japan	3–0 W
20 September 2010	2010 Asian Cup Championship	China	Vietnam	3–0 W
21 September 2010	2010 Asian Cup Championship	China	Chinese Taipei	3–2 W
23 September 2010	2010 Asian Cup Championship	China	Iran	3–0 W
24 September 2010	2010 Asian Cup Championship	China	South Korea	3–0 W
25 September 2010	2010 Asian Cup Championship	China	China	0–3 L
29 October 2010	2010 FIVB World Championship	Japan	United States	1–3 L
30 October 2010	2010 FIVB World Championship	Japan	Kazakhstan	3–1 W
31 October 2010	2010 FIVB World Championship	Japan	Croatia	3–0 W
2 November 2010	2010 FIVB World Championship	Japan	Cuba	0–3 L
3 November 2010	2010 FIVB World Championship	Japan	Germany	0–3 L
6 November 2010	2010 FIVB World Championship	Japan	Brazil	0–3 L
7 November 2010	2010 FIVB World Championship	Japan	Netherlands	3–1 W
9 November 2010	2010 FIVB World Championship	Japan	Italy	0–3 L
10 November 2010	2010 FIVB World Championship	Japan	Czech Republic	3–1 W
18 November 2010	2014 Asian Games	China	South Korea	0–3 L
19 November 2010	2014 Asian Games	China	Mongolia	3–0 W
21 November 2010	2014 Asian Games	China	Tajikistan	3–0 W
22 November 2010	2014 Asian Games	China	China	1–3 L
24 November 2010	2014 Asian Games	China	North Korea	2–3 L
25 November 2010	2014 Asian Games	China	Chinese Taipei	3–0 W
27 November 2010	2014 Asian Games	China	Japan	3–1 W

== 2011 ==
Date	Competition	Location	Opponent	Result
5 August 2011	2011 World Grand Prix	Thailand	Peru	3–0 W
6 August 2011	2011 World Grand Prix	Thailand	Cuba	3–2 W
7 August 2011	2011 World Grand Prix	Thailand	Russia	0–3 L
12 August 2011	2011 World Grand Prix	Kazakhstan	Brazil	0–3 L
13 August 2011	2011 World Grand Prix	Kazakhstan	Italy	2–3 L
14 August 2011	2011 World Grand Prix	Kazakhstan	Kazakhstan	3–0 W
19 August 2011	2011 World Grand Prix	Thailand	Argentina	3–0 W
20 August 2011	2011 World Grand Prix	Thailand	Cuba	3–1 W
21 August 2011	2011 World Grand Prix	Thailand	Brazil	0–3 L
24 August 2011	2011 World Grand Prix	Macau	Russia	1–3 L
25 August 2011	2011 World Grand Prix	Macau	China	3–1 W
26 August 2011	2011 World Grand Prix	Macau	Serbia	0–3 L
27 August 2011	2011 World Grand Prix	Macau	Japan	0–3 L
15 September 2011	2011 Asian Championship	Chinese Taipei	Vietnam	3–0 W
17 September 2011	2011 Asian Championship	Chinese Taipei	Australia	3–0 W
18 September 2011	2011 Asian Championship	Chinese Taipei	South Korea	1–3 L
19 September 2011	2011 Asian Championship	Chinese Taipei	Japan	0–3 L
21 September 2011	2011 Asian Championship	Chinese Taipei	Chinese Taipei	3–0 W
22 September 2011	2011 Asian Championship	Chinese Taipei	Japan	2–3 L
23 September 2011	2011 Asian Championship	Chinese Taipei	South Korea	2–3 L
14 December 2011	2011 Southeast Asian Games	Indonesia	Malaysia	3–0 W
16 December 2011	2011 Southeast Asian Games	Indonesia	Vietnam	3–0 W
18 December 2011	2011 Southeast Asian Games	Indonesia	Myanmar	3–0 W
19 December 2011	2011 Southeast Asian Games	Indonesia	Indonesia	3–0 W
21 December 2011	2011 Southeast Asian Games	Indonesia	Vietnam	3–0 W

== 2012 ==
Date	Competition	Location	Opponent	Result
19 May 2012	2012 FIVB Olympic Games qualification	Japan	Russia	0–3 L
20 May 2012	2012 FIVB Olympic Games qualification	Japan	Serbia	3–0 W
22 May 2012	2012 FIVB Olympic Games qualification	Japan	Japan	0–3 L
23 May 2012	2012 FIVB Olympic Games qualification	Japan	Chinese Taipei	3–0 W
25 May 2012	2012 FIVB Olympic Games qualification	Japan	Peru	3–0 W
26 May 2012	2012 FIVB Olympic Games qualification	Japan	South Korea	0–3 L
27 May 2012	2012 FIVB Olympic Games qualification	Japan	Cuba	3–1 W
8 June 2012	2012 World Grand Prix	Macau	Argentina	3–0 W
9 June 2012	2012 World Grand Prix	Macau	Puerto Rico	3–0 W
10 June 2012	2012 World Grand Prix	Macau	China	1–3 L
15 June 2012	2012 World Grand Prix	Japan	Puerto Rico	3–1 W
16 June 2012	2012 World Grand Prix	Japan	Dominican Republic	3–0 W
17 June 2012	2012 World Grand Prix	Japan	Japan	3–2 W
22 June 2012	2012 World Grand Prix	Thailand	Argentina	3–0 W
23 June 2012	2012 World Grand Prix	Thailand	Serbia	3–1 W
24 June 2012	2012 World Grand Prix	Thailand	United States	0–3 L
27 June 2012	2012 World Grand Prix	China	Turkey	1–3 L
28 June 2012	2012 World Grand Prix	China	United States	1–3 L
29 June 2012	2012 World Grand Prix	China	China	3–2 W
30 June 2012	2012 World Grand Prix	China	Brazil	0–3 L
1 July 2012	2012 World Grand Prix	China	Cuba	3–0 W
10 September 2012	2012 Asian Cup Championship	Kazakhstan	South Korea	3–0 W
11 September 2012	2012 Asian Cup Championship	Kazakhstan	Chinese Taipei	3–0 W
12 September 2012	2012 Asian Cup Championship	Kazakhstan	Kazakhstan	3–1 W
14 September 2012	2012 Asian Cup Championship	Kazakhstan	Iran	3–0 W
15 September 2012	2012 Asian Cup Championship	Kazakhstan	Vietnam	3–0 W
16 September 2012	2012 Asian Cup Championship	Kazakhstan	China	3–1 W

== 2013 ==
Date	Competition	Location	Opponent	Result
17 May 2013	2013 China International Friendly Match	China	Cuba	3–2 W
18 May 2013	2013 China International Friendly Match	China	China	0–3 L
19 May 2013	2013 China International Friendly Match	China	Puerto Rico	3–0 W
22 May 2013	2013 China International Friendly Match	China	China	0–3 L
23 May 2013	2013 China International Friendly Match	China	Cuba	3–2 W
24 May 2013	2013 China International Friendly Match	China	Puerto Rico	3–2 W
2 August 2013	2013 World Grand Prix	Turkey	Japan	0–3 L
3 August 2013	2013 World Grand Prix	Turkey	Turkey	0–3 L
4 August 2013	2013 World Grand Prix	Turkey	Algeria	3–0 W
9 August 2013	2013 World Grand Prix	Russia	Cuba	3–1 W
10 August 2013	2013 World Grand Prix	Russia	Russia	0–3 L
11 August 2013	2013 World Grand Prix	Russia	Italy	0–3 L
16 August 2013	2013 World Grand Prix	Thailand	Puerto Rico	3–1 W
17 August 2013	2013 World Grand Prix	Thailand	Germany	0–3 L
18 August 2013	2013 World Grand Prix	Thailand	Russia	2–3 L
4 September 2013	2014 FIVB World Championship qualification	Japan	Australia	3–0 W
6 September 2013	2014 FIVB World Championship qualification	Japan	Chinese Taipei	3–0 W
7 September 2013	2014 FIVB World Championship qualification	Japan	Vietnam	3–0 W
8 September 2013	2014 FIVB World Championship qualification	Japan	Japan	0–3 L
13 September 2013	2013 Asian Championship	Thailand	Kazakhstan	1–3 L
14 September 2013	2013 Asian Championship	Thailand	Australia	3–0 W
15 September 2013	2013 Asian Championship	Thailand	Mongolia	3–0 W
16 September 2013	2013 Asian Championship	Thailand	Japan	3–1 W
17 September 2013	2013 Asian Championship	Thailand	Vietnam	3–0 W
19 September 2013	2013 Asian Championship	Thailand	Chinese Taipei	3–0 W
20 September 2013	2013 Asian Championship	Thailand	China	3–2 W
21 September 2013	2013 Asian Championship	Thailand	Japan	3–0 W
12 November 2013	2013 FIVB World Grand Champions Cup	Japan	Dominican Republic	0–3 L
13 November 2013	2013 FIVB World Grand Champions Cup	Japan	Brazil	0–3 L
15 November 2013	2013 FIVB World Grand Champions Cup	Japan	Japan	0–3 L
16 November 2013	2013 FIVB World Grand Champions Cup	Japan	United States	2–3 L
17 November 2013	2013 FIVB World Grand Champions Cup	Japan	Russia	3–1 W
14 December 2013	2013 Southeast Asian Games	Myanmar	Malaysia	3–0 W
16 December 2013	2013 Southeast Asian Games	Myanmar	Vietnam	3–0 W
18 December 2013	2013 Southeast Asian Games	Myanmar	Myanmar	3–0 W
19 December 2013	2013 Southeast Asian Games	Myanmar	Indonesia	3–0 W
21 December 2013	2013 Southeast Asian Games	Myanmar	Vietnam	3–0 W

== 2014 ==
Date	Competition	Location	Opponent	Result
27 June 2014	2014 China International Friendly Match	China	Dominican Republic	1–3 L
28 June 2014	2014 China International Friendly Match	China	Belgium	3–2 W
29 June 2014	2014 China International Friendly Match	China	China	0–3 L
3 July 2014	2014 China International Friendly Match	China	Belgium	0–3 L
4 July 2014	2014 China International Friendly Match	China	Dominican Republic	3–2 W
5 July 2014	2014 China International Friendly Match	China	China	0–3 L
1 August 2014	2014 World Grand Prix	South Korea	South Korea	1–3 L
2 August 2014	2014 World Grand Prix	South Korea	Serbia	3–2 W
3 August 2014	2014 World Grand Prix	South Korea	Germany	0–3 L
8 August 2014	2014 World Grand Prix	Hong Kong	China	1–3 L
9 August 2014	2014 World Grand Prix	Hong Kong	Italy	0–3 L
10 August 2014	2014 World Grand Prix	Hong Kong	Japan	1–3 L
15 August 2014	2014 World Grand Prix	Thailand	Dominican Republic	3–1 W
16 August 2014	2014 World Grand Prix	Thailand	United States	2–3 L
17 August 2014	2014 World Grand Prix	Thailand	Brazil	0–3 L
6 September 2014	2014 Asian Cup Championship	China	Chinese Taipei	2–3 L
7 September 2014	2014 Asian Cup Championship	China	Kazakhstan	0–3 L
8 September 2014	2014 Asian Cup Championship	China	Japan	0–3 L
10 September 2014	2014 Asian Cup Championship	China	China	0–3 L
11 September 2014	2014 Asian Cup Championship	China	Vietnam	3–0 W
12 September 2014	2014 Asian Cup Championship	China	Chinese Taipei	3–0 W
21 September 2014	2014 Asian Games	South Korea	Japan	3–1 W
23 September 2014	2014 Asian Games	South Korea	South Korea	0–3 L
23 September 2014	2014 FIVB World Championship	Italy	Russia	0–3 L
24 September 2014	2014 Asian Games	South Korea	India	3–0 W
24 September 2014	2014 FIVB World Championship	Italy	Netherlands	0–3 L
25 September 2014	2014 FIVB World Championship	Italy	Peru	3–0 W
27 September 2014	2014 Asian Games	South Korea	Kazakhstan	3–0 W
27 September 2014	2014 FIVB World Championship	Italy	United States	0–3 L
28 September 2014	2014 FIVB World Championship	Italy	Kazakhstan	0–3 L
30 September 2014	2014 Asian Games	South Korea	China	1–3 L
2 October 2014	2014 Asian Games	South Korea	Japan	3–0 W

== 2015 ==
Date	Competition	Location	Opponent	Result
11 June 2015	2015 Southeast Asian Games	Singapore	Myanmar	3–0 W
12 June 2015	2015 Southeast Asian Games	Singapore	Singapore	3–0 W
14 June 2015	2015 Southeast Asian Games	Singapore	Indonesia	3–1 W
15 June 2015	2015 Southeast Asian Games	Singapore	Vietnam	3–0 W
3 July 2015	2015 World Grand Prix	Thailand	Serbia	3–2 W
4 July 2015	2015 World Grand Prix	Thailand	Japan	0–3 L
5 July 2015	2015 World Grand Prix	Thailand	Brazil	0–3 L
10 July 2015	2015 World Grand Prix	Brazil	Germany	3–0 W
11 July 2015	2015 World Grand Prix	Brazil	Brazil	1–3 L
12 July 2015	2015 World Grand Prix	Brazil	Belgium	3–1 W
16 July 2015	2015 World Grand Prix	Hong Kong	China	0–3 L
17 July 2015	2015 World Grand Prix	Hong Kong	United States	1–3 L
18 July 2015	2015 World Grand Prix	Hong Kong	Japan	0–3 L
20 August 2015	2015 Asian Championship	China	Chinese Taipei	3–0 W
21 August 2015	2015 Asian Championship	China	Hong Kong	3–0 W
22 August 2015	2015 Asian Championship	China	Sri Lanka	3–0 W
23 August 2015	2015 Asian Championship	China	Kazakhstan	3–0 W
24 August 2015	2015 Asian Championship	China	South Korea	2–3 L
26 August 2015	2015 Asian Championship	China	Japan	3–0 W
27 August 2015	2015 Asian Championship	China	China	1–3 L
28 August 2015	2015 Asian Championship	China	Chinese Taipei	3–0 W

== 2016 ==
Date	Competition	Location	Opponent	Result
14 May 2016	2016 FIVB Olympic Games qualification	Japan	Dominican Republic	3–1 W
15 May 2016	2016 FIVB Olympic Games qualification	Japan	Italy	1–3 L
17 May 2016	2016 FIVB Olympic Games qualification	Japan	Netherlands	0–3 L
18 May 2016	2016 FIVB Olympic Games qualification	Japan	Japan	2–3 L
20 May 2016	2016 FIVB Olympic Games qualification	Japan	Kazakhstan	3–0 W
21 May 2016	2016 FIVB Olympic Games qualification	Japan	South Korea	3–2 W
22 May 2016	2016 FIVB Olympic Games qualification	Japan	Peru	3–0 W
1 June 2016	2016 Montreux Volley Masters	Switzerland	Serbia	3–2 W
2 June 2016	2016 Montreux Volley Masters	Switzerland	Netherlands	3–2 W
3 June 2016	2016 Montreux Volley Masters	Switzerland	Switzerland	3–0 W
4 June 2016	2016 Montreux Volley Masters	Switzerland	Turkey	3–2 W
5 June 2016	2016 Montreux Volley Masters	Switzerland	China	0–3 L
10 June 2016	2016 World Grand Prix	China	China	0–3 L
11 June 2016	2016 World Grand Prix	China	United States	0–3 L
12 June 2016	2016 World Grand Prix	China	Germany	3–1 W
18 June 2016	2016 World Grand Prix	Italy	Russia	0–3 L
19 June 2016	2016 World Grand Prix	Italy	Netherlands	0–3 L
20 June 2016	2016 World Grand Prix	Italy	Italy	3–2 W
24 June 2016	2016 World Grand Prix	Japan	Japan	0–3 L
25 June 2016	2016 World Grand Prix	Japan	Russia	1–3 L
26 June 2016	2016 World Grand Prix	Japan	Serbia	0–3 L
6 July 2016	2016 World Grand Prix	Thailand	Brazil	0–3 L
8 July 2016	2016 World Grand Prix	Thailand	Russia	0–3 L
10 July 2016	2016 World Grand Prix	Thailand	China	0–3 L
14 September 2016	2016 Asian Cup Championship	Vietnam	Chinese Taipei	3–2 W
15 September 2016	2016 Asian Cup Championship	Vietnam	Vietnam	3–0 W
16 September 2016	2016 Asian Cup Championship	Vietnam	Iran	3–0 W
18 September 2016	2016 Asian Cup Championship	Vietnam	South Korea	3–0 W
19 September 2016	2016 Asian Cup Championship	Vietnam	China	2–3 L
20 September 2016	2016 Asian Cup Championship	Vietnam	Japan	3–0 W

== 2017 ==
Date	Competition	Location	Opponent	Result
1 June 2017	Friendly Match	Thailand	South Korea	2–3 L
7 June 2017	2017 Montreux Volley Masters	Switzerland	Poland	1–3 L
8 June 2017	2017 Montreux Volley Masters	Switzerland	Germany	1–3 L
9 June 2017	2017 Montreux Volley Masters	Switzerland	Brazil	1–3 L
10 June 2017	2017 Montreux Volley Masters	Switzerland	Netherlands	1–3 L
7 July 2017	2017 World Grand Prix	Netherlands	Japan	2–3 L
8 July 2017	2017 World Grand Prix	Netherlands	Netherlands	0–3 L
9 July 2017	2017 World Grand Prix	Netherlands	Dominican Republic	1–3 L
16 July 2017	2017 World Grand Prix	Japan	Japan	1–3 L
17 June 2017	2017 World Grand Prix	Japan	Brazil	3–0 W
18 July 2017	2017 World Grand Prix	Japan	Serbia	1–3 L
21 July 2017	2017 World Grand Prix	Thailand	Dominican Republic	2–3 L
22 July 2017	2017 World Grand Prix	Thailand	Turkey	3–0 W
22 July 2017	2017 World Grand Prix	Thailand	Italy	3–0 W
9 August 2017	2017 Asian Championship	Philippines	Maldives	3–0 W
10 August 2017	2017 Asian Championship	Philippines	Iran	3–0 W
11 August 2017	2017 Asian Championship	Philippines	Chinese Taipei	3–0 W
13 August 2017	2017 Asian Championship	Philippines	China	3–2 W
14 August 2017	2017 Asian Championship	Philippines	Japan	1–3 L
15 August 2017	2017 Asian Championship	Philippines	Philippines	3–0 W
16 August 2017	2017 Asian Championship	Philippines	South Korea	3–0 W
17 August 2017	2017 Asian Championship	Philippines	Japan	2–3 L
23 August 2017	2017 Southeast Asian Games	Malaysia	Indonesia	3–0 W
24 August 2017	2017 Southeast Asian Games	Malaysia	Myanmar	3–0 W
26 August 2017	2017 Southeast Asian Games	Malaysia	Philippines	3–0 W
27 August 2017	2017 Southeast Asian Games	Malaysia	Indonesia	3–0 W
20 September 2017	2018 FIVB World Championship qualification	Thailand	Iran	3–0 W
21 September 2017	2018 FIVB World Championship qualification	Thailand	Vietnam	3–0 W
23 September 2017	2018 FIVB World Championship qualification	Thailand	North Korea	3–0 W
24 September 2017	2018 FIVB World Championship qualification	Thailand	South Korea	0–3 L

== 2018 ==
Date	Competition	Location	Opponent	Result
2018	2018 Nations League	Russia	Netherlands	0–3 L
2018	2018 Nations League	Russia	Russia	1–3 L
2018	2018 Nations League	Russia	Argentina	3–0 W
2018	2018 Nations League	China	Serbia	1–3 L
2018	2018 Nations League	China	China	1–3 L
2018	2018 Nations League	China	Poland	3–2 W
2018	2018 Nations League	Thailand	Dominican Republic	0–3 L
2018	2018 Nations League	Thailand	Germany	2–3 L
2018	2018 Nations League	Thailand	United States	0–3 L
2018	2018 Nations League	Thailand	South Korea	1–3 L
2018	2018 Nations League	Thailand	Turkey	1–3 L
2018	2018 Nations League	Thailand	Japan	2–3 L
2018	2018 Nations League	Italy	Italy	0–3 L
2018	2018 Nations League	Italy	Brazil	1–3 L
2018	2018 Nations League	Italy	Belgium	1–3 L
2018	2018 Asian Games	Indonesia	Philippines	3–0 W
2018	2018 Asian Games	Indonesia	Japan	3–0 W
2018	2018 Asian Games	Indonesia	Hong Kong	3–0 W
2018	2018 Asian Games	Indonesia	Indonesia	3–1 W
2018	2018 Asian Games	Indonesia	Vietnam	3–0 W
2018	2018 Asian Games	Indonesia	South Korea	3–1 W
2018	2018 Asian Games	Indonesia	China	0–3 L
2018	2018 Asian Women's Volleyball Cup	Thailand	Japan	3–1 W
2018	2018 Asian Women's Volleyball Cup	Thailand	South Korea	3–0 W
2018	2018 Asian Women's Volleyball Cup	Thailand	Australia	3–0 W
2018	2018 Asian Women's Volleyball Cup	Thailand	China	2–3 L
2018	2018 Asian Women's Volleyball Cup	Thailand	Chinese Taipei	3–0 W
2018	2018 World Championship	Japan	South Korea	3–2 W
2018	2018 World Championship	Japan	Russia	2–3 L
2018	2018 World Championship	Japan	Trinidad and Tobago	3–1 W
2018	2018 World Championship	Japan	United States	2–3 L
2018	2018 World Championship	Japan	Azerbaijan	3–1 W
2018	2018 World Championship	Japan	China	0–3 L
2018	2018 World Championship	Japan	Italy	0–3 L
2018	2018 World Championship	Japan	Bulgaria	2–3 L
2018	2018 World Championship	Japan	Turkey	1–3 L
