= Joanne Morgan =

Joanne Morgan may refer to:

- Joanne Morgan (netball) (born 1979), Australian netball player
- Joanne Morgan (volleyball) (born 1983), British volleyball player
