= Grace Carter =

Grace Carter may refer to:

- Grace Carter (singer) (born 1997), English singer and songwriter
- Grace Carter (volleyball) (born 1989), English volleyball player
