= Wei Qiuyue =

Chinese volleyball player (born 1988)

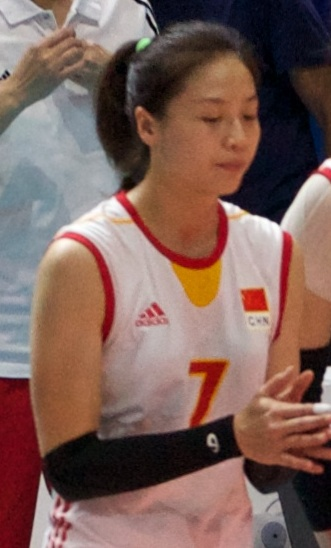
- Wei Qiuyue in 2014

Personal information
- Nationality: Chinese
- Born: 26 September 1988 (age 38) Tianjin, China
- Home town: Tianjin, China
- Height: 1.82 m (6 ft 0 in)
- Weight: 65 kg (143 lb)
- Spike: 305 cm (120 in)
- Block: 300 cm (120 in)

Volleyball information
- Position: Setter
- Current club: retired

Career
- Years: Team
- 2003–2013 2013–2014 2014–2017: Tianjin Bridgestone; Igtisadchi Baku; Tianjin Bridgestone

National team
- Years: Team
- 2007–2012 2014–2016: China
Honours
Volleyball
Olympic Games
Gold medal – first place	2016 Rio de Janeiro	Team
Bronze medal – third place	2008 Beijing	Team
World Championship
Silver medal – second place	2014 Italy	Team
World Cup
Gold medal – first place	2015 Japan	Team
Bronze medal – third place	2011 Japan	Team
World Grand Prix
Silver medal – second place	2007 Ningbo	Team
Asian Games
Gold medal – first place	2010 Guangzhou
Asian Championship
Gold medal – first place	2011 Taipei
Silver medal – second place	2007 Nakhon Ratchasima
Silver medal – second place	2009 Hanoi
Asian Cup
Gold medal – first place	2008 Nakhon Ratchasima
Gold medal – first place	2010 Tai Cang

Wei Qiuyue (Chinese: 魏秋月; pinyin: Wèi Qiūyuè; born 26 September 1988) is a retired Chinese volleyball player. She was the captain of China women's national volleyball team from 2008 to 2012.

== Career ==
Wei was part of the bronze medal winning team at the 2008 Beijing Olympic Games and the silver medal winning team at the 2007 World Grand Prix.

Wei won the 2010 Montreux Volley Masters with her national team and was awarded Best Setter.

Wei was named Best Setter at the 2010 World Championship.

After a disappointing fifth place at the 2012 Summer Olympics, in 2013 Wei took a year off from the national team to attend to her knee injury. She signed with Igtisadchi Baku in 2013-2014 season, along with her former teammates Ma Yunwen and Zhang Lei. This was the first time she played for a club other than Tianjin.

In 2014, Wei was recalled to the national team by Lang Ping and gained a starting position for the national team which she helped to win the silver medal at the 2014 World Championship. After a successful season with the national team, she took some time off from the domestic league and went to the United States to attend her sore knees which has affected her for a long time with help from Lang Ping. She came back to the national team in 2015 and was part of the Chinese team that won gold medal at the 2015 World Cup.

In 2016, Wei participated at the Summer Olympics where her team won gold by beating Serbia 3-1 in the final. She announced her retirement from the national team right after the award ceremony through CCTV5.

After the 13th Chinese National Games in 2017, Wei announced her retirement as a professional volleyball player.

== Clubs ==
- (China) Tianjin Bridgestone (2003–2013)
- (Azerbaijan) Igtisadchi Baku (2013–2014)
- (China) Tianjin Bridgestone (2014–2017)

== Individual awards ==
- 2007 Montreux Volley Masters "Best Setter"
- 2007 FIVB World Grand Prix "Best Setter"
- 2008 Asian Cup Championship "Most Valuable Player"
- 2010 Montreux Volley Masters "Best Setter"
- 2010 FIVB Women's World Championship "Best Setter"
- 2011 Asian Women's Volleyball Championship "Best Server"

== See also ==
- China at the 2012 Summer Olympics#Volleyball
- Volleyball at the 2012 Summer Olympics – Women's tournament

Awards
Preceded by (Italy) Eleonora Lo Bianco	Best Setter of FIVB World Grand Prix; 2007	Succeeded by (Japan) Yoshie Takeshita
