= 2007 Montreux Volley Masters =

Women's volleyball tournament

The 2007 Montreux Volley Masters was held in Montreux, Switzerland between 5 June and 10 June 2007. In the tournament participated 8 teams. The team of China won the Tournament, Cuba placed 2nd and the Netherlands 3rd.

== Participated teams ==
- China
- Cuba
- Germany
- Netherlands
- Poland
- Russia
- Serbia
- Turkey

== Groups ==
Group A	Group B
Germany; Netherlands; Russia; Serbia	China; Cuba; Poland; Turkey

== Group A ==
Pos	Team	Pld	W	L	Pts	SW	SL	SR	SPW	SPL	SPR	Qualification
1	Netherlands	3	3	0	6	9	5	1.800	297	262	1.134	Semifinals
2	Serbia	3	2	1	5	8	4	2.000	277	240	1.154	Semifinals
3	Germany	3	1	2	4	5	7	0.714	263	267	0.985	
4	Russia	3	0	3	3	2	9	0.222	207	275	0.753	

=== Results ===
5 June 2007
Serbia	2 – 3	Netherlands
6 June 2007
Netherlands	3 – 2	Germany
Russia	1 – 3	Serbia
7 June 2007
Russia	1 – 3	Germany
8 June 2007
Serbia	3 – 0	Germany
Russia	0 – 3	Netherlands

== Group B ==
Pos	Team	Pld	W	L	Pts	SW	SL	SR	SPW	SPL	SPR	Qualification
1	China	3	2	1	5	8	4	2.000	267	234	1.141	Semifinals
2	Cuba	3	2	1	5	8	5	1.600	289	263	1.099	Semifinals
3	Turkey	3	1	2	4	6	8	0.750	296	310	0.955	
4	Poland	3	1	2	4	3	8	0.375	210	255	0.824	

=== Results ===
5 June 2007
China	3 – 1	Turkey
Poland	0 – 3	Cuba
6 June 2007
China	3 – 0	Poland
7 June 2007
Turkey	2 – 3	Poland
China	2 – 3	Cuba
8 June 2007
Cuba	2 – 3	Turkey

== Final round ==
Semifinals
9 June 2007 - Montreux
Netherlands	0
Cuba	3
9 June 2007 - Montreux
China	3
Serbia	0

Final
10 June 2007 - Montreux
Cuba	0
China	3
3rd place
10 June 2007 - Montreux
Netherlands	3
Serbia	1

5-8th place
9 June 2007 - Montreux
Germany	3
Poland	1
9 June 2007 - Montreux
Turkey	3
Russia	0

5th place
10 June 2007 - Montreux
Germany	3
Turkey	0

== Final standings ==
Rank	Team
1st place, gold medalist(s)	China
2nd place, silver medalist(s)	Cuba
3rd place, bronze medalist(s)	Netherlands
4	Serbia
5	Germany
6	Turkey
7	Russia
7	Poland

== Awards ==
- Most valuable player: (Cuba) Nancy Carrillo
- Best scorer: (Turkey) Neslihan Darnel
- Best spiker: (Cuba) Rosir Calderón
- Best blocker: (Germany) Christiane Fürst
- Best server: (Cuba) Yanelis Santos
- Best digger: (Poland) Mariola Zenik
- Best receiver: (China) Zhang Xian
- Best setter: (China) Wei Qiuyue
