= 2011 Asian Women's Volleyball Championship =

International indoor volleyball tournament

Tournament details
- Host country: Taiwan
- City: Taipei
- Dates: 15–23 September
- Teams: 14 (from 1 confederation)
- Venue: 1 (in 1 host city)

Final positions
- Champions: China (12th title)
- Runners-up: Japan
- Third place: South Korea
- Fourth place: Thailand

Tournament awards
- MVP: (China) Wang Yimei

The 2011 Asian Women's Volleyball Championship was the sixteenth edition of the Asian Championship, a biennial international volleyball tournament organised by the Asian Volleyball Confederation (AVC) with Chinese Taipei Volleyball Association (CTVBA). The tournament was held in Taipei, Taiwan from 15 to 23 September 2011.

== Pools composition ==
The teams are seeded based on their final ranking at the 2009 Asian Women's Volleyball Championship.

Pool A	Pool B	Pool C	Pool D
Chinese Taipei (Host & 6th); Iran (8th); Indonesia	Thailand (1st); Vietnam (7th); Australia	China (2nd); Kazakhstan (5th); North Korea; India	Japan (3rd); South Korea (4th); Sri Lanka; Turkmenistan

== Preliminary round ==
=== Pool A ===
Pos	Team	Pld	W	L	Pts	SW	SL	SR	SPW	SPL	SPR	Qualification
1	Chinese Taipei	2	2	0	6	6	0	MAX	150	84	1.786	Pool E
2	Iran	2	1	1	2	3	5	0.600	162	187	0.866	Pool E
3	Indonesia	2	0	2	1	2	6	0.333	147	188	0.782	Pool G

Date	Time		Score		Set 1	Set 2	Set 3	Set 4	Set 5	Total	Report
15 Sep	19:00	Chinese Taipei	3–0	Indonesia	25–8	25–12	25–15			75–35	Report
16 Sep	18:00	Iran	0–3	Chinese Taipei	13–25	20–25	16–25			49–75	Report
17 Sep	10:00	Indonesia	2–3	Iran	25–20	27–29	24–26	25–23	11–15	112–113	Report

=== Pool B ===
Pos	Team	Pld	W	L	Pts	SW	SL	SR	SPW	SPL	SPR	Qualification
1	Thailand	2	2	0	6	6	0	MAX	152	97	1.567	Pool F
2	Vietnam	2	1	1	3	3	4	0.750	145	166	0.873	Pool F
3	Australia	2	0	2	0	1	6	0.167	138	172	0.802	Pool H

Date	Time		Score		Set 1	Set 2	Set 3	Set 4	Set 5	Total	Report
15 Sep	14:00	Vietnam	0–3	Thailand	15–25	25–27	8–25			48–77	Report
16 Sep	14:00	Australia	1–3	Vietnam	25–21	24–26	20–25	20–25		89–97	Report
17 Sep	16:00	Thailand	3–0	Australia	25–11	25–19	25–19			75–49	Report

=== Pool C ===
Pos	Team	Pld	W	L	Pts	SW	SL	SR	SPW	SPL	SPR	Qualification
1	China	3	3	0	9	9	0	MAX	225	140	1.607	Pool E
2	North Korea	3	2	1	6	6	5	1.200	235	241	0.975	Pool E
3	Kazakhstan	3	1	2	3	4	7	0.571	232	248	0.935	Pool G
4	India	3	0	3	0	2	9	0.222	203	266	0.763	Pool G

Date	Time		Score		Set 1	Set 2	Set 3	Set 4	Set 5	Total	Report
15 Sep	10:00	Kazakhstan	3–1	India	22–25	27–25	25–19	25–10		99–79	Report
15 Sep	21:00	North Korea	0–3	China	19–25	15–25	15–25			49–75	Report
16 Sep	12:00	North Korea	3–1	Kazakhstan	19–25	25–20	25–23	25–21		94–89	Report
16 Sep	16:00	China	3–0	India	25–20	25–15	25–12			75–47	Report
17 Sep	12:00	India	1–3	North Korea	25–17	21–25	9–25	22–25		77–92	Report
17 Sep	18:00	Kazakhstan	0–3	China	14–25	17–25	13–25			44–75	Report

=== Pool D ===
Pos	Team	Pld	W	L	Pts	SW	SL	SR	SPW	SPL	SPR	Qualification
1	Japan	3	3	0	8	9	2	4.500	256	119	2.151	Pool F
2	South Korea	3	2	1	7	8	3	2.667	243	132	1.841	Pool F
3	Sri Lanka	3	1	2	3	3	6	0.500	127	150	0.847	Pool H
4	Turkmenistan	3	0	3	0	0	9	0.000	0	225	0.000	Pool H

Date	Time		Score		Set 1	Set 2	Set 3	Set 4	Set 5	Total	Report
15 Sep	12:00	Sri Lanka	0–3	South Korea	9–25	11–25	6–25			26–75	Report
15 Sep	16:00	Japan	3–0	Turkmenistan	25–0	25–0	25–0			75–0	Forfeit
16 Sep	10:00	Turkmenistan	0–3	South Korea	0–25	0–25	0–25			0–75	Forfeit
16 Sep	20:00	Japan	3–0	Sri Lanka	25–9	25–12	25–5			75–26	Report
17 Sep	14:00	Sri Lanka	3–0	Turkmenistan	25–0	25–0	25–0			75–0	Forfeit
17 Sep	20:00	South Korea	2–3	Japan	25–23	15–25	25–18	23–25	5–15	93–106	Report

== Classification round ==
- The results and the points of the matches between the same teams that were already played during the preliminary round shall be taken into account for the classification round.

=== Pool E ===
Pos	Team	Pld	W	L	Pts	SW	SL	SR	SPW	SPL	SPR	Qualification
1	China	3	3	0	9	9	0	MAX	225	132	1.705	Quarterfinals
2	Chinese Taipei	3	2	1	6	6	4	1.500	221	203	1.089	Quarterfinals
3	North Korea	3	1	2	3	4	6	0.667	203	218	0.931	Quarterfinals
4	Iran	3	0	3	0	0	9	0.000	129	225	0.573	Quarterfinals

Date	Time		Score		Set 1	Set 2	Set 3	Set 4	Set 5	Total	Report
18 Sep	18:00	Chinese Taipei	3–1	North Korea	22–25	25–19	25–14	25–21		97–79	Report
18 Sep	20:00	China	3–0	Iran	25–17	25–8	25–9			75–34	Report
19 Sep	18:00	Iran	0–3	North Korea	11–25	14–25	21–25			46–75	Report
19 Sep	20:00	Chinese Taipei	0–3	China	15–25	14–25	20–25			49–75	Report

=== Pool F ===
Pos	Team	Pld	W	L	Pts	SW	SL	SR	SPW	SPL	SPR	Qualification
1	Japan	3	3	0	8	9	2	4.500	258	212	1.217	Quarterfinals
2	South Korea	3	2	1	7	8	4	2.000	269	243	1.107	Quarterfinals
3	Thailand	3	1	2	3	4	6	0.667	218	223	0.978	Quarterfinals
4	Vietnam	3	0	3	0	0	9	0.000	163	230	0.709	Quarterfinals

Date	Time		Score		Set 1	Set 2	Set 3	Set 4	Set 5	Total	Report
18 Sep	14:00	Thailand	1–3	South Korea	27–25	17–25	13–25	21–25		78–100	Report
18 Sep	16:00	Japan	3–0	Vietnam	25–12	25–19	27–25			77–56	Report
19 Sep	14:00	Vietnam	0–3	South Korea	12–25	24–26	23–25			59–76	Report
19 Sep	16:00	Thailand	0–3	Japan	23–25	21–25	19–25			63–75	Report

=== Pool G ===
Pos	Team	Pld	W	L	Pts	SW	SL	SR	SPW	SPL	SPR	Qualification
1	Kazakhstan	2	2	0	6	6	1	6.000	174	128	1.359	9th–12th places
2	India	2	1	1	3	4	3	1.333	158	163	0.969	9th–12th places
3	Indonesia	2	0	2	0	0	6	0.000	113	154	0.734	13th–14th places

Date	Time		Score		Set 1	Set 2	Set 3	Set 4	Set 5	Total	Report
18 Sep	10:00	Indonesia	0–3	India	14–25	27–29	23–25			64–79	Report
19 Sep	10:00	Indonesia	0–3	Kazakhstan	18–25	15–25	16–25			49–75	Report

=== Pool H ===
Pos	Team	Pld	W	L	Pts	SW	SL	SR	SPW	SPL	SPR	Qualification
1	Australia	2	2	0	6	3	0	MAX	150	51	2.941	9th–12th places
2	Sri Lanka	2	1	1	3	3	0	MAX	126	75	1.680	9th–12th places
3	Turkmenistan	2	0	2	0	0	6	0.000	0	150	0.000	13th–14th places

Date	Time		Score		Set 1	Set 2	Set 3	Set 4	Set 5	Total	Report
18 Sep	12:00	Australia	3–0	Turkmenistan	25–0	25–0	25–0			75–0	Forfeit
19 Sep	12:00	Australia	3–0	Sri Lanka	25–13	25–22	25–16			75–51	Report

== Classification 13th–14th ==
Date	Time		Score		Set 1	Set 2	Set 3	Set 4	Set 5	Total	Report
21 Sep	09:00	Indonesia	3–0	Turkmenistan	25–0	25–0	25–0			75–0	Forfeit

== Classification 9th–12th ==
9th–12th places
21 September – Taipei
Kazakhstan	3
Sri Lanka	0
21 September – Taipei
Australia	3
India	1

9th place
22 September – Taipei
Kazakhstan	3
Australia	0
11th place
22 September – Taipei
Sri Lanka	1
India	3

=== Semifinals ===
Date	Time		Score		Set 1	Set 2	Set 3	Set 4	Set 5	Total	Report
21 Sep	10:30	Kazakhstan	3–0	Sri Lanka	25–9	25–21	25–9			75–39	Report
21 Sep	12:30	Australia	3–1	India	23–25	25–23	25–23	25–21		98–92	Report

=== 11th place ===
Date	Time		Score		Set 1	Set 2	Set 3	Set 4	Set 5	Total	Report
22 Sep	10:00	Sri Lanka	1–3	India	18–25	25–19	13–25	19–25		75–94	Report

=== 9th place ===
Date	Time		Score		Set 1	Set 2	Set 3	Set 4	Set 5	Total	Report
22 Sep	12:00	Kazakhstan	3–0	Australia	26–24	25–14	25–21			76–59	Report

== Final round ==
Quarterfinals
21 September – Taipei
China	3
Vietnam	0
21 September – Taipei
South Korea	3
North Korea	1
21 September – Taipei
Chinese Taipei	0
Thailand	3
21 September – Taipei
Japan	3
Iran	0

Semifinals
22 September – Taipei
China	3
South Korea	1
22 September – Taipei
Thailand	2
Japan	3

Final
23 September – Taipei
China	3
Japan	1
3rd place
23 September – Taipei
South Korea	3
Thailand	2

5th–8th places
22 September – Taipei
Vietnam	0
North Korea	3
22 September – Taipei
Chinese Taipei	3
Iran	0

5th place
23 September – Taipei
North Korea	1
Chinese Taipei	3
7th place
23 September – Taipei
Vietnam	3
Iran	1

=== Quarterfinals ===
Date	Time		Score		Set 1	Set 2	Set 3	Set 4	Set 5	Total	Report
21 Sep	15:00	Japan	3–0	Iran	25–8	25–17	25–14			75–39	Report
21 Sep	17:00	China	3–0	Vietnam	25–19	25–12	25–15			75–46	Report
21 Sep	19:00	Chinese Taipei	0–3	Thailand	23–25	25–27	23–25			71–77	Report
21 Sep	21:00	South Korea	3–1	North Korea	25–20	25–14	22–25	25–14		97–73	Report

=== 5th–8th semifinals ===
Date	Time		Score		Set 1	Set 2	Set 3	Set 4	Set 5	Total	Report
22 Sep	14:00	Vietnam	0–3	North Korea	18–25	23–25	25–27			66–77	Report
22 Sep	18:00	Chinese Taipei	3–0	Iran	25–8	25–18	25–20			75–46	Report

=== Semifinals ===
93-

Date	Time		Score		Set 1	Set 2	Set 3	Set 4	Set 5	Total	Report
22 Sep	16:00	Thailand	2–3	Japan	13–25	25–20	18–25	25–23	13–15	94–108	Report
22 Sep	20:00	China	3–1	South Korea	25–14	25–20	21–25	25–16		96–75	Report

=== 7th place ===
Date	Time		Score		Set 1	Set 2	Set 3	Set 4	Set 5	Total	Report
23 Sep	11:00	Vietnam	3–1	Iran	25–14	25–23	18–25	25–11		93–73	Report

=== 5th place ===
Date	Time		Score		Set 1	Set 2	Set 3	Set 4	Set 5	Total	Report
23 Sep	13:00	North Korea	1–3	Chinese Taipei	25–17	17–25	20–25	18–25		80–92	Report

=== 3rd place ===
Date	Time		Score		Set 1	Set 2	Set 3	Set 4	Set 5	Total	Report
23 Sep	15:00	South Korea	3–2	Thailand	22–25	26–24	23–25	27–25	15–13	113–112	Report

=== Final ===
Date	Time		Score		Set 1	Set 2	Set 3	Set 4	Set 5	Total	Report
23 Sep	17:00	China	3–1	Japan	25–16	25–17	25–27	25–17		100–77	Report

== Final standing ==
Rank	Team
1st place, gold medalist(s)	China
2nd place, silver medalist(s)	Japan
3rd place, bronze medalist(s)	South Korea
4	Thailand
5	Chinese Taipei
6	North Korea
7	Vietnam
8	Iran
9	Kazakhstan
10	Australia
11	India
12	Sri Lanka
13	Indonesia
14	Turkmenistan

Qualified for the 2011 World Cup and 2012 Olympic Qualifier
Qualified for the 2012 Olympic Qualifier and 2012 World Grand Prix
Qualified for the 2012 World Grand Prix

2011 Asian Women's champions

China
12th title

Team Roster
Wang Yimei, Mi Yang, Yang Jie, Hui Ruoqi, Zhang Xian, Wei Qiuyue, Yang Junjing, Xu Yunli, Chen Liyi, Ma Yunwen, Zhang Lei, Fan Linlin
Head Coach: Yu Juemin

== Awards ==
- MVP: (China) Wang Yimei
- Best scorer: (South Korea) Kim Yeon-koung
- Best spiker: (South Korea) Kim Yeon-koung
- Best blocker: (China) Yang Junjing
- Best server: (China) Wei Qiuyue
- Best setter: (Japan) Yoshie Takeshita
- Best libero: (South Korea) Nam Jie-youn

== See also ==
- List of sporting events in Taiwan
