= Yang Junjing =

Chinese volleyball player

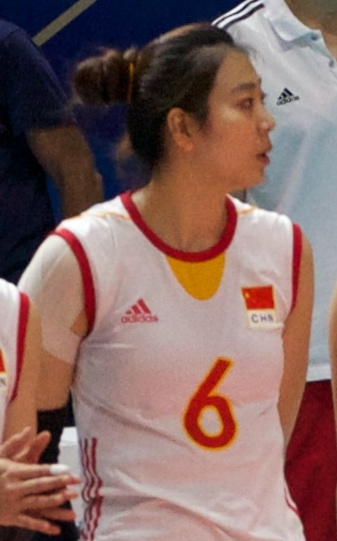
- Yang Junjing in 2014

Personal information
- Full name: Yang Junjing
- Nickname: Police
- Nationality: Chinese
- Born: 15 May 1989 (age 37) Zhengzhou, Henan, China
- Home town: Zhengzhou, Henan, China
- Height: 1.90 m (6 ft 3 in)
- Weight: 70 kg (154 lb)
- Spike: 315 cm (124 in)
- Block: 306 cm (120 in)

Volleyball information
- Position: Middle blocker
- Current club: Bayi
- Number: 9

National team
- Years: Team
- 2011–2016: China
Honours
Women's volleyball
Representing China
World Championship
Silver medal – second place	2014 Italy	Team
World Cup
Bronze medal – third place	2011 Japan	Team
Gold medal – first place	2015 Japan	Team
Asian Championship
Gold medal – first place	2011 Taipei	Team
Gold medal – first place	2015 Tianjin	Team
Montreux Volley Masters
Gold medal – first place	2016 Switzerland
- Updated on October 2013

Yang Junjing (simplified Chinese: 杨珺菁; traditional Chinese: 楊珺菁; pinyin: yáng jùn jīng; born 15 May 1989 in Zhengzhou, Henan) is a Chinese volleyball player. She is the middle blocker of China women's national volleyball team, participating in the 2012 Summer Olympics.

== Career ==
Yang played at the 2013 Club World Championship with Guangdong Evergrande winning the bronze medal after defeating 3-1 to Voléro Zürich.

== Clubs ==
- (China) Nanjing Forces (2007 - 2009)
- (China) Bayi (2009 - 2013, 2014–present)
- (China) Guangdong Evergrande (2013 - 2014)

== Awards ==
=== Individuals ===
- 2011 Asian Women's Volleyball Championship "Best Blocker"
- 2014 FIVB Volleyball Women's World Championship "Best Middle Blocker"

=== Clubs ===
- 2013 Club World Championship - Bronze medal, with Guangdong Evergrande

== See also ==
- China at the 2012 Summer Olympics § Volleyball
- Volleyball at the 2012 Summer Olympics – Women's tournament.
