= Great Britain women's national volleyball team =

Women's national volleyball team representing the UK

Great Britain
- Association: British Volleyball Federation
- Confederation: CEV
- FIVB ranking: NR (2 October 2026)

Uniforms
Home	Away

Summer Olympics
- Appearances: 1 (2012)
- Best result: 9th (2012)

The Great Britain women's national volleyball team is the team representing Great Britain in volleyball competitions. The Great Britain Volleyball programme team was resumed in 2006 following an agreement of the FIVB to permit the national teams of Scotland, Northern Ireland and England to compete together for the 2012 Summer Olympics and 2012 Summer Paralympics. After losing 0–3 to Russia, they got their first Olympic victory, beating Algeria 3–2, a team ranked 53 places above them.

== 2012 roster ==
The following is the British roster in the women's volleyball tournament of the 2012 Summer Olympics.

Head coach: Audrey Cooper

№	Name	Date of birth	Height	Weight	Spike	Block	2012 club
1	Savanah Leaf	24 November 1993	1.83 m (6 ft 0 in)	68 kg (150 lb)	316 cm (124 in)	289 cm (114 in)	(United States) University of Miami
2	Lucy Wicks	20 March 1982	1.73 m (5 ft 8 in)	60 kg (130 lb)	285 cm (112 in)	274 cm (108 in)	(Germany) Alemannia Aachen
4	Rachel Laybourne	23 May 1982	1.78 m (5 ft 10 in)	65 kg (143 lb)	299 cm (118 in)	279 cm (110 in)	(Poland) Silesia Volley Myslowice
6	Jennifer Taylor	16 August 1980	1.79 m (5 ft 10 in)	74 kg (163 lb)	287 cm (113 in)	278 cm (109 in)	(Netherlands) TFM/DOK Dwingeloo
7	Maria Bertelli (L)	6 October 1977	1.71 m (5 ft 7 in)	64 kg (141 lb)	279 cm (110 in)	263 cm (104 in)	(Switzerland) VBC Köniz
8	Rachel Bragg	11 December 1984	1.85 m (6 ft 1 in)	74 kg (163 lb)	300 cm (120 in)	283 cm (111 in)	(Germany) VT Aurubis Hamburg
9	Joanne Morgan	7 October 1983	1.68 m (5 ft 6 in)	62 kg (137 lb)	278 cm (109 in)	271 cm (107 in)	(Netherlands) TFM/DOK Dwingeloo
10	Lynne Beattie (c)	23 December 1985	1.82 m (6 ft 0 in)	64 kg (141 lb)	305 cm (120 in)	287 cm (113 in)	(Spain) CV Las Palmas
12	Elizabeth Reid	21 March 1989	1.80 m (5 ft 11 in)	76 kg (168 lb)	314 cm (124 in)	300 cm (120 in)	(United States) University of Georgia
17	Janine Sandell	7 December 1985	1.80 m (5 ft 11 in)	84 kg (185 lb)	305 cm (120 in)	283 cm (111 in)	(Spain) CV Albacete
18	Grace Carter	10 August 1989	1.83 m (6 ft 0 in)	84 kg (185 lb)	304 cm (120 in)	291 cm (115 in)	(France) Olympic Terville Florange
19	Ciara Michel	2 July 1985	1.95 m (6 ft 5 in)	70 kg (150 lb)	320 cm (130 in)	302 cm (119 in)	(Germany) Alemannia Aachen
