= Victoria Kuzyakina =

Russian volleyball player (born 1985)

Viktorija Kuzjakina
Personal information
- Nationality: Russian
- Born: 1 June 1985 (age 41)
- Height: 175 cm (69 in)
- Weight: 70 kg (154 lb)
- Spike: 290 cm (114 in)
- Block: 287 cm (113 in)

Volleyball information
- Position: Libero
- Number: 2 (national team)

Career
- Years: Team
- 2015: VK Omička

National team
- Years: Team
- 2009-2015: Russia

Viktorija Kuzjakina (born 1 June 1985) is a Russian female volleyball player, playing as a libero. She is part of the Russia women's national volleyball team.

She competed at the 2009, 2011 and 2015 Women's European Volleyball Championship. She participated in the 2015 FIVB Volleyball World Grand Prix. On club level she plays for VK Omička.

Awards
Preceded by (China) Zhang Xian	Best Libero of FIVB World Grand Prix; 2011	Succeeded by (China) Zhang Xian
