= 2008 Montreux Volley Masters =

Women's volleyball tournament

The 2008 Montreux Volley Masters was held in Montreux, Switzerland between 4 June and 8 June 2008. In the tournament participated 6 teams. The team of Cuba won the Tournament, China placed 2nd and Italy 3rd.

== Participated teams ==
- China
- Cuba
- Germany
- Italy
- Netherlands
- Serbia

== Standings ==
Pos	Team	Pld	W	L	Pts	SW	SL	SR	SPW	SPL	SPR
1	Cuba	5	5	0	10	15	5	3.000	476	405	1.175
2	China	5	4	1	9	13	7	1.857	467	431	1.084
3	Italy	5	3	2	8	12	8	1.500	426	433	0.984
4	Netherlands	5	2	3	7	6	11	0.545	372	409	0.910
5	Germany	5	1	4	6	7	12	0.583	415	429	0.967
6	Serbia	5	0	5	5	5	15	0.333	422	471	0.896

=== Results ===
4 June
Italy	3 - 2	Germany	(25 : 20; 18 : 25; 25 : 20; 18 : 25; 15 : 11
Cuba	3 - 0	Netherlands	(25 : 16; 25 : 14; 25 : 21)
China	3 - 2	Serbia	(25 : 22; 25 : 16; 23 : 25; 21 : 25; 15 : 13)
5 June
Germany	3 - 0	Serbia	(25 : 23; 25 : 18; 25 : 21)
Cuba	3 - 1	China	(25 : 21; 22 : 25; 25 : 16; 25 : 19)
Italy	3 - 0	Netherlands	(25 : 23; 25 : 15; 25 : 22)
6 June
Germany	1 - 3	Cuba	(25 : 13; 26 : 28; 18 : 25; 20 : 25)
Netherlands	0 - 3	China	(22 : 25; 30 : 32; 19 : 25)
Italy	3 - 0	Serbia	(25 : 21; 25 : 19; 25 : 21)
7 June
Netherlands	3 - 0	Germany	(25 : 20; 26 : 24; 26 : 24)
Serbia	1 - 3	Cuba	(19 : 25; 26 : 24; 23 : 25; 21 : 25)
Italy	1 - 3	China	(23 : 25; 25 : 22; 16 : 25; 16 : 25)
8 June
Serbia	2 - 3	Netherlands	(20 : 25; 23 : 25; 25 : 21; 29 : 27; 12 : 15)
China	3 - 1	Germany	(25 : 19; 25 : 19; 23 : 25; 25 : 19)
Italy	2 - 3	Cuba	(27 : 25; 26 : 24; 12 : 25; 20 : 25; 10 : 15)

== Final standings ==
Place	Team
Gold	Cuba
Silver	China
Bronze	Italy
4.	Netherlands
5.	Germany
6.	Serbia

Montreux Volley Masters champions

Cuba
9th title

== Awards ==
- Best scorer: (China) Wang Yimei
- Best spiker: (Cuba) Daimí Ramírez
- Best blocker: (Cuba) Nancy Carrillo
- Best server: (Serbia) Ivana Nešović
- Best digger: (Germany) Kerstin Tzscherlich
- Best receiver: (Netherlands) Alice Blom
- Best setter: (China) Feng Kun
