= 2010 AVC Cup for Women =

International indoor volleyball tournament

2010 Asian Women's Volleyball Cup

Tournament details
- Host country: China
- City: Taicang
- Dates: 19–25 September
- Teams: 8
- Venue: 1 (in 1 host city)

Final positions
- Champions: China (2nd title)
- Runners-up: Thailand
- Third place: South Korea
- Fourth place: Japan

Tournament awards
- MVP: (China) Wang Yimei

The 2010 Asian Women's Volleyball Cup, so-called 2010 AVC Cup for Women was the second edition of the Asian Cup, a biennial international volleyball tournament organised by the Asian Volleyball Confederation (AVC) with Chinese Volleyball Association (CVA). The tournament was held in Taicang Gymnasium, Taicang, China from 19 to 25 September 2010.

== Pools composition ==
The teams were seeded based on their final ranking at the 2009 Asian Women's Volleyball Championship.

Pool A	Pool B
China (Host & 2nd); South Korea (4th); Kazakhstan; Iran	Thailand (1st); Japan (3rd); Chinese Taipei; Vietnam

== Preliminary round ==
=== Pool A ===
Pos	Team	Pld	W	L	Pts	SW	SL	SR	SPW	SPL	SPR	Qualification
1	China	3	3	0	6	9	0	MAX	225	160	1.406	Quarterfinals
2	South Korea	3	2	1	5	6	3	2.000	209	186	1.124	Quarterfinals
3	Kazakhstan	3	1	2	4	3	6	0.500	190	194	0.979	Quarterfinals
4	Iran	3	0	3	3	0	9	0.000	141	225	0.627	Quarterfinals

Date	Time		Score		Set 1	Set 2	Set 3	Set 4	Set 5	Total	Report
19 Sep	15:00	Kazakhstan	0–3	South Korea	19–25	19–25	18–25			56–75	Report
19 Sep	19:30	China	3–0	Iran	25–16	25–13	25–13			75–42	Report
20 Sep	15:00	Iran	0–3	South Korea	18–25	14–25	23–25			55–75	Report
20 Sep	19:30	China	3–0	Kazakhstan	25–16	25–21	25–22			75–59	Report
21 Sep	12:00	Kazakhstan	3–0	Iran	25–22	25–18	25–4			75–44	Report
21 Sep	19:30	South Korea	0–3	China	23–25	14–25	22–25			59–75	Report

=== Pool B ===
Pos	Team	Pld	W	L	Pts	SW	SL	SR	SPW	SPL	SPR	Qualification
1	Thailand	3	3	0	6	9	2	4.500	267	224	1.192	Quarterfinals
2	Japan	3	2	1	5	6	4	1.500	237	213	1.113	Quarterfinals
3	Chinese Taipei	3	1	2	4	6	7	0.857	296	298	0.993	Quarterfinals
4	Vietnam	3	0	3	3	1	9	0.111	187	252	0.742	Quarterfinals

Date	Time		Score		Set 1	Set 2	Set 3	Set 4	Set 5	Total	Report
19 Sep	12:00	Thailand	3–0	Japan	25–22	25–20	25–20			75–62	Report
19 Sep	17:00	Vietnam	1–3	Chinese Taipei	29–27	20–25	12–25	20–25		81–102	Report
20 Sep	12:00	Japan	3–1	Chinese Taipei	25–18	25–27	25–23	25–23		100–91	Report
20 Sep	17:00	Thailand	3–0	Vietnam	25–22	25–20	25–17			75–59	Report
21 Sep	15:00	Chinese Taipei	2–3	Thailand	25–23	17–25	26–24	17–25	18–20	103–117	Report
21 Sep	17:00	Vietnam	0–3	Japan	13–25	17–25	17–25			47–75	Report

== Final round ==
Quarterfinals
23 September – Taicang
China	3
Vietnam	0
23 September – Taicang
Japan	3
Kazakhstan	0
23 September – Taicang
Thailand	3
Iran	0
23 September – Taicang
South Korea	3
Chinese Taipei	0

Semifinals
24 September – Taicang
China	3
Japan	0
24 September – Taicang
Thailand	3
South Korea	2

Final
25 September – Taicang
China	3
Thailand	0
3rd place
25 September – Taicang
Japan	0
South Korea	3

5th–8th places
24 September – Taicang
Iran	0
Chinese Taipei	3
24 September – Taicang
Vietnam	0
Kazakhstan	3

5th place
25 September – Taicang
Chinese Taipei	2
Kazakhstan	3
7th place
25 September – Taicang
Iran	0
Vietnam	3

=== Quarterfinals ===
Date	Time		Score		Set 1	Set 2	Set 3	Set 4	Set 5	Total	Report
23 Sep	12:00	Japan	3–0	Kazakhstan	25–22	25–19	25–19			75–60	Report
23 Sep	15:00	South Korea	3–0	Chinese Taipei	25–15	25–14	25–11			75–40	Report
23 Sep	17:00	Thailand	3–0	Iran	25–15	25–11	25–15			75–41	Report
23 Sep	19:30	China	3–0	Vietnam	25–12	25–14	25–19			75–45	Report

=== 5th–8th semifinals ===
Date	Time		Score		Set 1	Set 2	Set 3	Set 4	Set 5	Total	Report
24 Sep	12:00	Iran	0–3	Chinese Taipei	14–25	25–27	15–25			54–77	Report
24 Sep	15:00	Vietnam	0–3	Kazakhstan	21–25	14–25	14–25			49–75	Report

=== Semifinals ===
Date	Time		Score		Set 1	Set 2	Set 3	Set 4	Set 5	Total	Report
24 Sep	17:00	Thailand	3–2	South Korea	27–25	22–25	25–18	20–25	15–11	109–104	Report
24 Sep	19:30	China	3–0	Japan	25–22	25–21	25–20			75–63	Report

=== 7th place ===
Date	Time		Score		Set 1	Set 2	Set 3	Set 4	Set 5	Total	Report
25 Sep	12:00	Iran	0–3	Vietnam	9–25	18–25	18–25			45–75	Report

=== 5th place ===
Date	Time		Score		Set 1	Set 2	Set 3	Set 4	Set 5	Total	Report
25 Sep	15:00	Chinese Taipei	2–3	Kazakhstan	25–22	23–25	25–16	22–25	15–17	110–105	Report

=== 3rd place ===
Date	Time		Score		Set 1	Set 2	Set 3	Set 4	Set 5	Total	Report
25 Sep	17:00	Japan	0–3	South Korea	22–25	23–25	7–25			52–75	Report

=== Final ===
Date	Time		Score		Set 1	Set 2	Set 3	Set 4	Set 5	Total	Report
25 Sep	19:30	China	3–0	Thailand	25–23	25–21	25–19			75–63	Report

== Final standing ==
Rank	Team
1st place, gold medalist(s)	China
2nd place, silver medalist(s)	Thailand
3rd place, bronze medalist(s)	South Korea
4	Japan
5	Kazakhstan
6	Chinese Taipei
7	Vietnam
8	Iran

2010 Asian Women's Cup champions

China
2nd title

Team Roster

Wang Yimei, Zhang Lei, Shen Jingsi, Zhang Xian, Wei Qiuyue, Li Juan, Xu Yunli, Xue Ming, Chen Liyi, Ma Yunwen, Bian Yuqian, Fan Linlin

Head Coach: Yu Juemin

== Awards ==
- MVP: (China) Wang Yimei
- Best scorer: (South Korea) Kim Yeon-koung
- Best spiker: (South Korea) Kim Yeon-koung
- Best blocker: (South Korea) Yang Hyo-jin
- Best server: (Chinese Taipei) Chen Wan-ting
- Best setter: (Thailand) Nootsara Tomkom
- Best libero: (China) Zhang Xian

== See also ==
- 2010 Asian Men's Volleyball Cup
