= Masami Yokoyama =

Japanese volleyball player

Personal information
- Full name: Masami Yokoyama
- Nickname: Charmy
- Born: December 12, 1981 (age 44); Koto, Tokyo, Japan
- Height: 1.70 m (5 ft 7 in)
- Weight: 57 kg (126 lb)
- Spike: 285 cm (112 in)
- Block: 272 cm (107 in)

Volleyball information
- Position: Setter
- Current club: Igtisadchi Baku

Masami Yokoyama (横山雅美 Yokoyama Masami, born December 12, 1981) is a Japanese volleyball player who plays for Igtisadchi Baku.

== Clubs ==
- Bunkyojoshi univ. Junior High → Seitoku Gakuen High School → Kaetujoshi college → Denso Airybees (2002-2010) → Hitachi Rivale (2010-2011) → (Azerbaijan) Igtisadchi Baku

== National team ==
- Japan Universiade national team (2001, 2003)
- Japan World Grand Prix 2005

== Honors ==
- Team
  - Japan Volleyball League/V.League/V.Premier
    Runners-up (1): 2007-2008
  - Kurowashiki All Japan Volleyball Championship
    Champions (1): 2008
