= Kerstin Tzscherlich =

German volleyball player (born 1978)

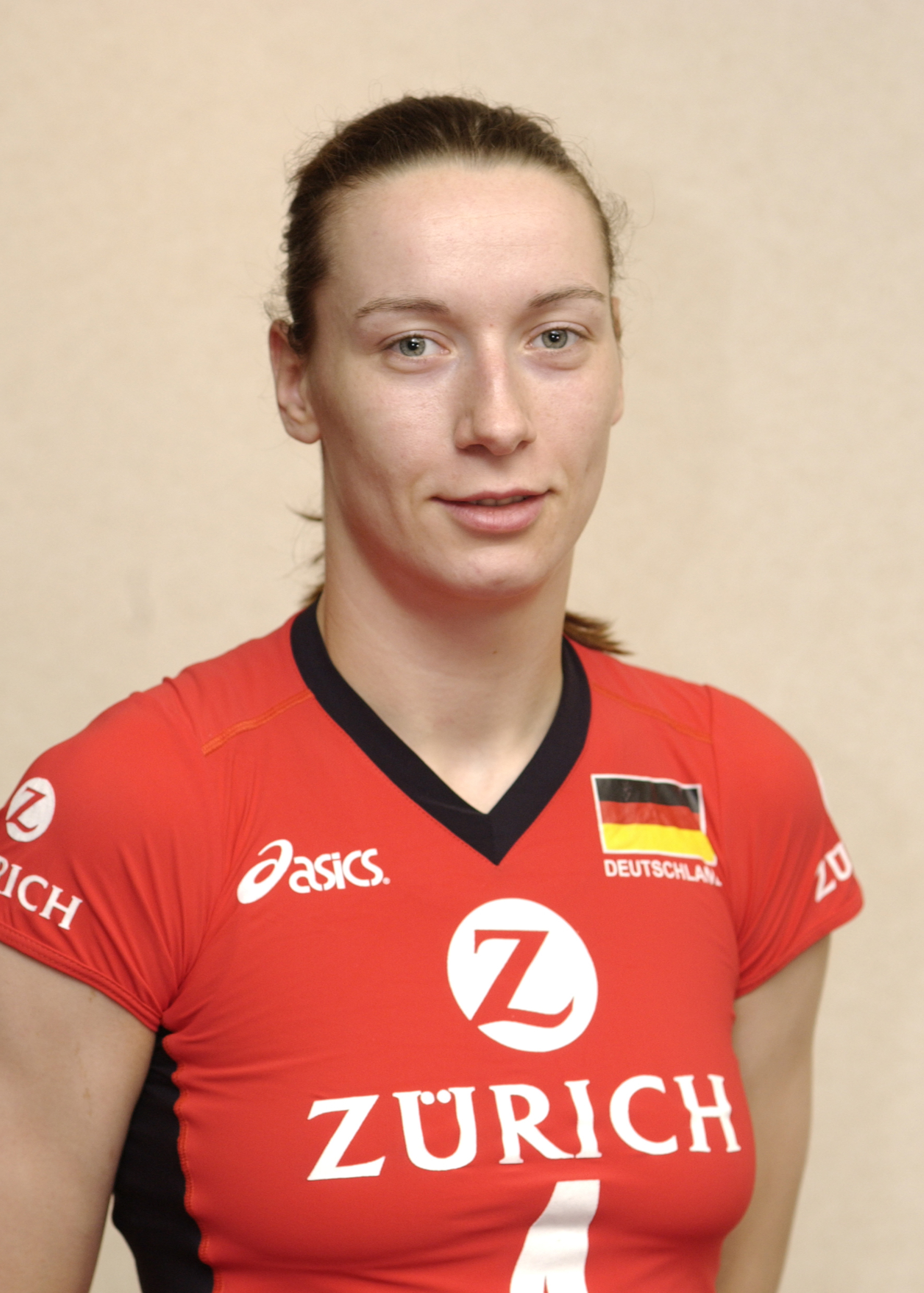

Personal information
- Nationality: German
- Born: 15 February 1978 (age 48); Freital, East Germany (now Germany)
Honours
Women's volleyball
Representing Germany
European Championship
Silver medal – second place	2011 Italy-Serbia	Team competition
Bronze medal – third place	2003 Ankara	Team competition
FIVB Grand Prix
Bronze medal – third place	2002 Hong Kong	Team competition
Bronze medal – third place	2009 Tokyo	Team competition

Kerstin Tzscherlich (born 15 February 1978) is a German volleyball player. She played as a libero for the German Women's National Team since 1997.

She represented her native country in two consecutive Summer Olympics, starting in 2000. She played at the 2002 FIVB Volleyball Women's World Championship in Germany. On club level she played with Dresdner SC.

She is 179 cm tall, and nicknamed "Tzscherli".

== Honours ==
- 1998 World Championship — 13th place
- 1999 European Championship — 4th place
- 2000 Olympic Games — 6th place
- 2001 European Championship — 9th place
- 2002 FIVB World Grand Prix — 3rd place
- 2002 World Championship — 10th place
- 2003 European Championship — 3rd place
- 2004 Olympic Games — 9th place
- 2005 FIVB World Grand Prix — 10th place
- 2005 European Championship — 11th place
- 2006 World Championship — 11th place
- 2007 European Championship — 6th place
- 2009 FIVB World Grand Prix — 3rd place

== Awards ==
=== Individuals ===
- 2008 Montreux Volley Masters "Best Digger"
- 2009 World Grand Prix "Best Libero"
- 2009 European Championships "Best Receiver"

Awards
Preceded by (Japan) Yūko Sano	Best Libero of FIVB World Grand Prix; 2009	Succeeded by (China) Zhang Xian
