= Bian Yuqian =

Chinese volleyball player (born 1990)

Personal information
- Nationality: Chinese
- Born: 14 June 1990 (age 36); Shanghai, China
- Hometown: Shanghai, China
- Height: 1.80 m (5 ft 11 in)
- Weight: 70 kg (154 lb)
- Spike: 300 cm (118 in)
- Block: 292 cm (115 in)

Volleyball information
- Position: Setter
- Current club: Shanghai
- Number: 16

Career
Years	Teams
2006 - present	Shanghai

National team
2010	China
Honours
Asian Cup
Gold medal – first place	2010 Tai Cang	Team
- Last updated: December 30, 2016

Bian Yuqian (born 14 June 1990) is a Chinese female volleyball player. She was part of the China women's national volleyball team.

She participated in the 2010 FIVB Volleyball Women's World Championship. She played with Shanghai.

== Clubs ==
- Shanghai (2006–present)
