= Daimí Ramírez =

Cuban volleyball player (born 1983)

Personal information
- Full name: Daimí D. Ramírez Echevarría
- Born: 8 October 1983 (age 43); Havana, Cuba
- Height: 1.76 m (5 ft 9 in)
- Spike: 305 cm (120 in)
- Block: 290 cm (110 in)

Volleyball information
- Position: Setter / Wing Spiker / Opposite
- Number: 6
Honours
Women's volleyball
Representing Cuba
Olympic Games
Bronze medal – third place	2004 Athens	Team
FIVB World Grand Prix
Silver medal – second place	2008 Yokohama
Pan American Games
Gold medal – first place	2007 Rio de Janeiro	Team
Silver medal – second place	2003 Santo Domingo	Team
Pan-American Cup
Gold medal – first place	2007 Colima
Central American and Caribbean Games
Silver medal – second place	2006 Cartagena	Team

Daymi de La Caridad Ramirez Echevarria (born 8 October 1983) is a Cuban volleyball player who competed in the 2004 and 2008 Summer Olympics.

In 2004, Ramírez was a member of the Cuban team that won the bronze medal in the Olympic tournament.

Four years later, Ramírez finished fourth with the Cuban team in the 2008 Olympic tournament.

Ramírez was born in Havana.

== Awards ==
=== Individuals ===
- 2008 Montreux Volley Masters "Best Spiker"
- 2008 World Grand Prix "Best Spiker"

=== Clubs ===
- 2013-14 Azerbaijan Super League – Runner-Up, with Igtisadchi Baku
- 2017 South American Club Championship - Runner-up, with Praia Clube

Awards
Preceded by (Italy) Taismary Agüero	Best Spiker of FIVB World Grand Prix; 2008	Succeeded by (Russia) Tatiana Kosheleva
