= Alice Blom =

Dutch volleyball player (born 1980)

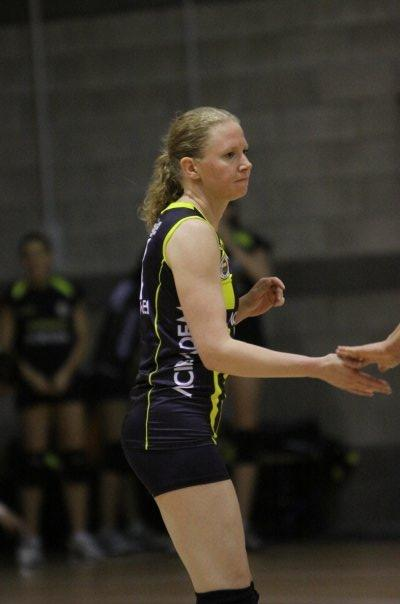

Personal information
- Born: 7 April 1980 (age 46); Oudeschild, Netherlands
- Height: 1.78 m (5 ft 10 in)
- Weight: 64 kg (141 lb)

Volleyball information
- Position: Outside Spiker
- Current club: Azerrail Baku
Honours
Women's volleyball
Representing the Netherlands
European Championship
Silver medal – second place	2009 Poland	Team
FIVB World Grand Prix
Gold medal – first place	2007 Ningbo	Team

Alice Blom (born 7 April 1980, in Oudeschild) is a volleyball player from the Netherlands, who plays as a spiker for Azerbaijani Igtisadchi Baku.

She was a member of the Dutch National Women's Team that won the gold medal at the FIVB World Grand Prix 2007 in Ningbo, PR China.

== Awards ==
=== Individuals ===
- 2008 Montreux Volley Masters "Best Receiver"

=== Clubs ===
- 2009-10 Turkish League Championship - Champion, with Fenerbahçe Acıbadem
- 2009-10 Turkish Cup Championship - Champion, with Fenerbahçe Acıbadem
- 2009-10 Turkish Super Cup Championship - Champion, with Fenerbahçe Acıbadem
- 2009-10 Women's CEV Champions League runner up, with Fenerbahçe Acıbadem
