= 2009 Montreux Volley Masters =

Women's volleyball tournament

The 2009 Montreux Volley Masters was held in Montreux, Switzerland between 9 June and 14 June 2009. In the tournament participated 8 teams.

== Participated teams ==
- Brazil
- China
- Cuba
- Germany
- Italy
- Japan
- Netherlands
- Poland

== Groups ==
Group A	Group B
Brazil; China; Germany; Poland	Cuba; Italy; Japan; Netherlands

== Group A ==
Pos	Team	Pld	W	L	Pts	SW	SL	SR	SPW	SPL	SPR	Qualification
1	Brazil	3	3	0	6	9	1	9.000	249	186	1.339	Semifinals
2	China	3	2	1	5	6	5	1.200	247	221	1.118	Semifinals
3	Poland	3	1	2	4	4	6	0.667	197	230	0.857	
4	Germany	3	0	3	3	2	9	0.222	203	260	0.781	

=== Results ===
9 June
China	3:0	Poland	(25:17; 25:21; 25:13)
Brazil	3:0	Germany	(25:20; 25:19; 25:14)
10 June
China	3:2	Germany	(25:14; 23:25; 25:23; 22:25; 15:7)
11 June
Germany	0:3	Poland	(23:25; 17:25; 16:25)
Brazil	3:0	China	(25:22; 25:19; 25:21)
12 June
Brazil	3:1	Poland	(25:18; 24:26; 25:14; 25:13)

== Group B ==
Pos	Team	Pld	W	L	Pts	SW	SL	SR	SPW	SPL	SPR	Qualification
1	Italy	3	2	1	5	8	5	1.600	281	257	1.093	Semifinals
2	Netherlands	3	2	1	5	8	3	2.667	255	235	1.085	Semifinals
3	Cuba	3	2	1	5	6	5	1.200	247	252	0.980	
4	Japan	3	0	3	3	0	9	0.000	191	230	0.830	

=== Results ===
9 June
Cuba	3:0	Japan	(28:26; 25:22; 27:25)
10 June
Japan	0:3	Netherlands	(22:25; 23:25; 22:25)
Italy	2:3	Cuba	(19:25; 25:21; 25:15; 23:25; 12:15)
11 June
Italy	3:2	Netherlands	(25:21; 19:25; 18:25; 25:23; 15:11)
12 June
Japan	0:3	Italy	(23:25; 12:25; 16:25)
Cuba	0:3	Netherlands	(23:25; 21:25; 22:25)

== Final round ==
Semi-finals
2009-06-13 – Montreux
Brazil	3
Netherlands	0
2009-06-13 - Montreux
Italy	3
China	0

Final
2009-06-14 – Montreux
Brazil	3
Italy	0
3rd place
2009-06-14 - Montreux
Netherlands	0
China	3

=== Semi-finals ===
13 June
Brazil	3:0	Netherlands	(25:23; 25:20; 25:16)
Italy	3:0	China	(31:29: 25:23; 25:23)

=== 3rd-place match ===
14 June
Netherlands	0:3	China	(22:25; 15:25; 20:25)

=== Final match ===
14 June
Brazil	3-0	Italy	(25:17; 25:18; 25:23)

5-8th place
2009-06-13 – Montreux
Poland	3
Japan	0
2009-06-13 - Montreux
Cuba	0
Germany	3

5th place
2009-06-14 – Montreux
Poland	3
Germany	2

=== Classification matches (5th–8th place) ===
13 June
Poland	3:0	Japan	(25:22; 25:23; 25:21)
Cuba	0:3	Germany	(17:25; 21:25; 12:25)

=== Classification match (5th–6th place) ===
14 June
Poland	3:2	Germany	(25:21; 25:19; 22:25; 11:25; 15:11)

== Final standings ==
Rank	Team
1st place, gold medalist(s)	Brazil
2nd place, silver medalist(s)	Italy
3rd place, bronze medalist(s)	China
4	Netherlands
5	Poland
6	Germany
7	Cuba
7	Japan

== Awards ==
Winners:

- MVP (Brazil) Fabiana Claudino
- Best spiker (China) Xue Ming
- Best blocker (Brazil) Caroline Gattaz
- Best server (Netherlands) Chaïne Staelens
- Best libero (Brazil) Fabiana de Oliveira
