= Rachel Laybourne =

British volleyball player (born 1982)

Rachel Laybourne (born 19 May 1982) is a British volleyball player. She competed for Great Britain at the 2012 Summer Olympics.
