= Janine Sandell =

British volleyball player (born 1985)

Personal information
- Nationality: British
- Born: 7 December, 1985
- Hometown: Bromley United Kingdom
- Height: 1.8 m (5 ft 11 in)
- Weight: 84 kg (185 lb)
- Spike: 305 cm (120 in)
- Block: 283 cm (111 in)

Volleyball information
- Position: Outside hitter

National team
2012 Great Britain women's national volleyball team

Janine Sandell (born 7 December 1985) is a British volleyball player. She competed for Great Britain at the 2012 Summer Olympics. Sandell was a member of the Great Britain team that won their first ever match in the modern Summer Olympics women's volleyball competition. She moved to Spain to play volleyball professionally in club CV Albacete and has played in several Spanish clubs since.
