= Volleyball at the 2012 Summer Olympics – Women's qualification =

The qualification for the 2012 Women's Olympic Volleyball Tournament took place from November 20, 2011 to June 10, 2012.

== Qualification summary ==
Means of qualification	Date	Host	Vacancies	Qualified
Host country	—N/a	—N/a	1	Great Britain
2011 World Cup	4–18 November 2011	Japan	3	Italy
2011 World Cup	4–18 November 2011	Japan	3	United States
2011 World Cup	4–18 November 2011	Japan	3	China
African Qualifier	2–4 February 2012	(Algeria) Blida	1	Algeria
North American Qualifier	29 Apr–5 May 2012	(Mexico) Tijuana	1	Dominican Republic
European Qualifier	1–6 May 2012	(Turkey) Ankara	1	Turkey
South American Qualifier	9–13 May 2012	(Brazil) São Carlos	1	Brazil
World Qualifier	19–27 May 2012	(Japan) Tokyo	3	Russia
World Qualifier	19–27 May 2012	(Japan) Tokyo	3	South Korea
World Qualifier	19–27 May 2012	(Japan) Tokyo	3	Serbia
Asian Qualifier	19–27 May 2012	(Japan) Tokyo	1	Japan
Total			12	

- The Asian Qualification Tournament was combined with the World Qualification Tournament. The first 3 place teams of the tournament won the Olympic spots as the winners of the World Qualification Tournament while the best Asian team except the top 3 winners qualify as the Asian Qualification Tournament winners.

== World Cup ==
Rank	Team
1st place, gold medalist(s)	Italy
2nd place, silver medalist(s)	United States
3rd place, bronze medalist(s)	China
4	Japan
5	Brazil
6	Germany
7	Serbia
8	Dominican Republic
9	South Korea
10	Argentina
11	Algeria
12	Kenya

== Continental qualification tournaments ==
=== Africa ===
- Venue: Blida, Algeria
- Dates: February 2–4, 2012
- All times are West Africa Time (UTC+01:00).

Pos	Team	Pld	W	L	Pts	SW	SL	SR	SPW	SPL	SPR
1	Algeria	3	3	0	6	9	2	4.500	268	180	1.489
2	Kenya	3	2	1	5	7	5	1.400	258	254	1.016
3	Egypt	3	1	2	4	6	6	1.000	257	254	1.012
4	Seychelles	3	0	3	3	0	9	0.000	130	225	0.578

Date	Time		Score		Set 1	Set 2	Set 3	Set 4	Set 5	Total	Report
02 Feb	16:00	Egypt	1–3	Algeria	20–25	25–23	17–25	20–25		82–98	Report
02 Feb	18:00	Seychelles	0–3	Kenya	15–25	21–25	23–25			59–75	Report
03 Feb	15:00	Algeria	3–0	Seychelles	25–6	25–6	25–12			75–24	Report
03 Feb	17:00	Kenya	3–2	Egypt	25–23	23–25	25–13	20–25	16–14	109–100	Report
04 Feb	15:00	Algeria	3–1	Kenya	25–16	25–21	20–25	25–12		95–74	Report
04 Feb	17:00	Egypt	3–0	Seychelles	25–18	25–8	25–21			75–47	Report

=== Europe ===
- Venue: Başkent Volleyball Hall, Ankara, Turkey
- Dates: May 1–6, 2012

==== Final standing ====
Rank	Team
1	Turkey
2	Poland
3	Russia
3	Germany
5	Netherlands
5	Bulgaria
7	Serbia
7	Croatia

=== North America ===
- Venue: High Performance Sports Center of Baja California, Tijuana, Baja California, Mexico
- Dates: Apr 29 – May 5, 2012

==== Final standing ====
Rank	Team
1	Dominican Republic
2	Cuba
3	Puerto Rico
4	Canada
5	Mexico
6	Costa Rica
7	Trinidad and Tobago
8	Honduras

=== South America ===
- Venue: Ginásio Milton Olaio Filho, São Carlos, São Paulo, Brazil
- Dates: May 9–13, 2012

==== Final standing ====
Rank	Team
1	Brazil
2	Peru
3	Venezuela
4	Colombia
5	Argentina
5	Uruguay
7	Chile

== World qualification tournament ==
- Venue: Tokyo Metropolitan Gymnasium, Tokyo, Japan
- Dates: May 19–27, 2012

=== Final standing ===
Rank	Team
1	Russia
2	South Korea
3	Serbia
4	Japan
5	Thailand
6	Cuba
7	Peru
8	Chinese Taipei
