= Igtisadchi Baku =

Sports club

Igtisadchi Baku VC
- Full name: İqtisadçı Bakı
- Founded: 2008
- Ground: Sports Games Palace Baku (Capacity: 1,000)
- Chairman: (Azerbaijan) Shamsaddin Hajiyev
- Manager: (Turkey) Bulent Karslioglu
- League: Azerbaijan Superleague
- 2012/2013: 2nd

Uniforms
Home	Away

Igtisadchi Baku Theme Song

Igtisadchi Baku is an Azerbaijani women's volleyball club.

== History ==
Igtisadchi Baku was founded in the summer of 2008 and immediately got the right to participate in the Azerbaijan Super League, qualifying after just one season to the CEV Women's Challenge Cup. The following season saw Igtisadchi Baku eliminated in the second round table of European competition, because of the deployment of an ineligible player in the qualification to the Challenge Cup.

In the 2009-2010 season, the club achieved third place in the championship, beating the Azerrail Baku and qualifying for the third consecutive season in the Challenge Cup.

In the 2012-2013 season, the club participated in the Women's CEV Volleyball Cup, being eliminated in the 8th final round of the competition. In the 2012/13 Azerbaijani Super League, the club claimed the silver medal, tied with Azerrail Baku.

In 2014, it was announced that team will not participate in the 2014-2015 season due to financial difficulties.

== Team ==
Season 2013–2014, as of April 2014.

Number	Player	Position	Height (m)	Weight (kg)	Birth date
1	(Thailand) Wanna Buakaew	Libero	1.72	54	2 January 1981 (age 45)
2	(Germany) Lenka Dürr	Libero	1.71	59	10 December 1990 (age 35)
3	(United States) Kim Willoughby	Outside-spiker	1.80	75	7 November 1980 (age 45)
4	(Azerbaijan) Indira Abdullayeva	Outside-spiker	1.75	63	20 March 1989 (age 37)
5	(Thailand) Pleumjit Thinkaow	Middle Blocker	1.80	64	9 November 1983 (age 42)
6	(Thailand) Onuma Sittirak	Outside-spiker	1.75	72	13 June 1986 (age 40)
7	(United States) Arielle Wilson	Middle Blocker	1.84	74	3 January 1989 (age 37)
8	(China) Wei Qiuyue	Setter	1.82	65	26 October 1988 (age 37)
9	(Spain) Romina Lamas	Setter	1.84	74	29 August 1978 (age 47)
10	(Thailand) Wilavan Apinyapong (c)	Outside-spiker	1.74	65	6 June 1984 (age 42)
11	(Dominican Republic) Marianne Fersola	Middle Blocker	1.90	60	16 January 1992 (age 34)
12	(Netherlands) Manon Flier	Opposite	1.92	73	8 February 1984 (age 42)
14	(United States) Deja McClendon	Outside-spiker	1.85	70	27 June 1992 (age 34)
15	(China) Ma Yunwen	Middle Blocker	1.89	70	19 October 1986 (age 39)
16	(China) Zhang Lei	Opposite	1.81	71	11 January 1985 (age 41)
18	(Italy) Valentina Serena	Setter	1.84	70	10 November 1981 (age 44)

2012–2013 Team
Number	Player	Position	Height (m)	Weight (kg)	Birth date
1	(Thailand) Wanna Buakaew	Libero	1.72	54	2 January 1981 (age 45)
3	(United States) Lauren Paolini	Middle Blocker	1.92	83	28 August 1987 (age 38)
4	(Brazil) Carol Gattaz	Middle Blocker	1.92	83	27 July 1981 (age 45)
5	(Thailand) Pleumjit Thinkaow	Middle Blocker	1.80	64	9 November 1983 (age 42)
6	(Thailand) Onuma Sittirak	Outside-spiker	1.75	72	13 June 1986 (age 40)
7	(Azerbaijan) Indira Abdullayeva	Libero	1.75	63	20 March 1989 (age 37)
8	(Dominican Republic) Niverka Marte	Setter	1.78	67	19 October 1990 (age 35)
9	(Colombia) Paola Ampudia	Outside-spiker	1.86	59	5 August 1988 (age 38)
9	(Cuba) Dayesi Maso	Outside-spiker	1.84	69	4 April 1990 (age 36)
10	(Thailand) Wilavan Apinyapong	Outside-spiker	1.74	65	6 June 1984 (age 42)
11	(Thailand) Amporn Hyapha	Middle Blocker	1.80	70	19 May 1985 (age 41)
12	(United States) Nancy Metcalf	Opposite	1.84	73	18 November 1978 (age 47)
13	(Thailand) Nootsara Tomkom (c)	Setter	1.69	69	7 July 1985 (age 41)
15	(Thailand) Malika Kanthong	Opposite	1.77	54	8 January 1987 (age 39)
16	(Russia) Nadezhda Gokhshtein	Middle-blocker	1.94	76	8 January 1987 (age 39)
18	(Cuba) Daimí Ramírez	Outside-spiker/Opposite	1.76	67	3 October 1983 (age 42)

2011–2012 Team
Number	Player	Position	Height (m)	Weight (kg)	Birth date
1	(Brazil) Erika Coimbra	Outside-spiker	1.80	75	23 March 1980 (age 46)
2	(Japan) Masami Yokoyama	Setter	1.70	59	12 December 1981 (age 44)
2	(Argentina) Georgina Pinedo	Outside-spiker	1.70	59	12 December 1981 (age 44)
3	(United States) Tayyiba Haneef-Park	Opposite	2.00	82	23 March 1979 (age 47)
4	(Croatia) Ilijana Dugandžić	Middle Blocker	1.89	74	17 April 1981 (age 45)
7	(Czech Republic) Kristýna Pastulová	Middle Blocker	1.98	84	22 October 1985 (age 40)
8	(Netherlands) Alice Blom	Outside-spiker	1.78	65	7 April 1980 (age 46)
9	(Brazil) Verônica Brito	Outside-spiker	1.84	73	3 February 1986 (age 40)
10	(Japan) Yuko Sano	Libero	1.59	54	26 July 1979 (age 47)
11	(Colombia) Kenny Moreno	Opposite	1.84	60	6 January 1979 (age 47)
12	(Brazil) Fernanda Ferreira	Setter	1.75	64	10 January 1980 (age 46)
13	(Croatia) Marina Katić	Setter	1.84	70	1 October 1983 (age 42)
14	(Dominican Republic) Prisilla Rivera	Outside-spiker	1.86	70	29 December 1984 (age 41)
15	(Belarus) Alina Ilyuta	Opposite	1.86	73	4 May 1991 (age 35)
16	(Azerbaijan) Elina Abbasova	Libero	1.73	56	16 June 1982 (age 44)
17	(Bulgaria) Lora Kitipova	Setter	1.84	65	19 May 1991 (age 35)
18	(United States) Jennifer Doris	Middle Blocker	1.96	77	3 November 1988 (age 37)

2010–2011 Team
Number	Player	Position	Height (m)	Weight (kg)	Birth date
1	(United States) Crystal Matich	Setter	1.80	71	9 December 1985 (age 40)
3	(United States) Tayyiba Haneef-Park	Opposite	2.00	82	23 March 1979 (age 47)
6	(Germany) Kathleen Weiß	Setter	1.77	62	2 February 1984 (age 42)
7	(Croatia) Ivana Miloš	Middle Blocker	1.88	71	7 March 1986 (age 40)
8	(Netherlands) Alice Blom	Outside-spiker	1.78	65	7 April 1980 (age 46)
9	(Finland) Riikka Lehtonen	Outside-spiker	1.81	72	24 July 1979 (age 47)
10	(Japan) Yuko Sano	Libero	1.59	54	26 July 1979 (age 47)
11	(Turkey) Filiz Özgür	Outside-spiker	1.85	76	22 May 1985 (age 41)
12	(Cuba) Yaima Ortíz	Outside-spiker	1.81	67	9 November 1981 (age 44)
13	(United States) Kelly Wing	Outside-spiker	1.78	63	13 August 1983 (age 42)
14	(Venezuela) Aleoscar Blanco	Middle Blocker	1.87	82	18 July 1987 (age 39)
15	(Spain) María Fernández	Middle Blocker	1.94	87	6 September 1982 (age 43)
16	(Azerbaijan) Elina Abbasova	Libero	1.73	56	16 June 1982 (age 44)
18	(Argentina) Yael Castiglione	Setter	1.85	72	27 September 1985 (age 40)

== Honours ==
- Azerbaijan Superleague :

Runner-up: 2012-13
3rd place: 2009-10, 2010-11, 2013-14

== Former coaches ==
Dates	Name
2012–2013	(Turkey) Bülent Karslioğlu
2012-2013 (2)	(Thailand) Kiattipong Radchatagriengkai
2013–2014	(Turkey) Bülent Karslioğlu
