= Elizabeth Reid (volleyball) =

British volleyball player (born 1989)

Elizabeth Reid (born 21 March 1989, London) is a retired British volleyball player. She competed for Great Britain at the 2012 Summer Olympics.
