= Lucy Wicks (volleyball) =

British volleyball player (born 1982)

Lucy Mauritia Wicks (born 20 March 1982) is a retired British volleyball player. She competed for Great Britain at the 2012 Summer Olympics.
