= Montreux Volley Masters =

Volleyball tournament

- Sport: Volleyball
- Founded: 1984
- Folded: 2020
- No. of teams: 8
- Continent: International (FIVB)
- Last champion: Poland (1st title)
- Most titles: Cuba (9 titles)

The Montreux Volley Masters (founded as the Coupe des Nations, later changed to BCV Volley Cup between 1990 and 1996 and to its final name in 1998) was an international invitational tournament for national teams in women's volleyball hosted by the Swiss Volley. Held annually in Montreux, Switzerland since 1984, it was the tournament that opened the international season for national teams. It ceased to exist after 34 editions in 2020.

The main objective of this competition was to work as a preparation for more important and prestigious volleyball tournaments organized by the Fédération Internationale de Volleyball (FIVB), such as the World Grand Prix, the World Championship, the World Cup and the Olympic Games. Many national teams used the tournament as a way of giving experience and international baggage to young players and, as a result, countries were often represented by their underage national teams.

== Results ==
Year	Final			3rd place match			Teams
Year	Champions	Score	Runners-up	3rd place	Score	4th place	Teams
1984	Netherlands	Round-robin	Switzerland	France	Round-robin	Yugoslavia	5
1985	Czechoslovakia	Round-robin	Italy	Switzerland	Round-robin	Yugoslavia	5
1986	France	Round-robin	Poland	Switzerland	Round-robin	Greece	5
1987	Switzerland	Round-robin	Yugoslavia	Greece	Round-robin	Finland	5
1988	Cuba	Round-robin	China	Yugoslavia	Round-robin	Finland	6
1989	Cuba	Round-robin	China	Japan	Round-robin	Czechoslovakia	9
1990	China	Round-robin	Cuba	South Korea	Round-robin	Netherlands	10
1991	Soviet Union	Round-robin	United States	Cuba	Round-robin	China	8
1992	Cuba	Round-robin	China	South Korea	Round-robin	United States	8
1993	Cuba	Round-robin	Brazil	South Korea	Round-robin	Switzerland	8
1994	Brazil	Round-robin	China	Russia	Round-robin	United States	8
1995	Brazil	Round-robin	Cuba	United States	Round-robin	Russia	8
1996	Cuba	Round-robin	Brazil	United States	Round-robin	China	8
1998	Cuba	Round-robin	China	Russia	Round-robin	Brazil	8
1999	Cuba	Round-robin	China	Italy	Round-robin	Brazil	8
2000	China	Round-robin	Russia	Croatia	Round-robin	Italy	8
2001	Cuba	Round-robin	Russia	Japan	Round-robin	China	8
2002	Russia	Round-robin	Italy	China	Round-robin	Netherlands	8
2003	China	Round-robin	Russia	Brazil	Round-robin	United States	8
2004	Italy	Round-robin	United States	China	Round-robin	Cuba	8
2005	Brazil	Round-robin	China	Italy	Round-robin	Japan	8
2006	Brazil	Round-robin	China	Cuba	Round-robin	Italy	8
2007	China	3–0	Cuba	Netherlands	3–1	Serbia	8
2008	Cuba	Round-robin	China	Italy	Round-robin	Netherlands	6
2009	Brazil	3–0	Italy	China	3–1	Netherlands	8
2010	China	3–1	United States	Cuba	3–0	Russia	8
2011	Japan	3–0	Cuba	China	3–1	United States	8
2013	Brazil	3–0	Russia	Dominican Republic	3–1	Italy	8
2014	Germany	3–1	United States	Russia	3–2	China	8
2015	Turkey	3–2	Japan	Netherlands	3–0	Russia	8
2016	China	3–0	Thailand	Turkey	3–1	Netherlands	8
2017	Brazil	3–0	Germany	China	3–1	Argentina	8
2018	Italy	3–0	Russia	Turkey	3–2	Brazil	8
2019	Poland	3–1	Japan	Italy	3–0	Thailand	8

== Medal summary ==
Rank	Nation	Gold	Silver	Bronze	Total
1	Cuba	9	4	3	16
2	Brazil	7	2	1	10
3	China	6	9	5	20
4	Russia (Note: FIVB considers Russia (Since 1993) as the inheritor of the records of Soviet Union (1948–1991) and CIS (1992).)	2	5	3	10
5	Italy	2	3	4	9
6	Japan	1	2	2	5
7	Switzerland	1	1	2	4
8	Germany	1	1	0	2
8	Poland	1	1	0	2
10	Netherlands	1	0	2	3
10	Turkey	1	0	2	3
12	France	1	0	1	2
13	Czech Republic (Note: FIVB considers Czech Republic (Since 1994) as the inheritor of the records of Czechoslovakia (1948–1993).)	1	0	0	1
14	United States	0	4	2	6
15	Serbia (Note: FIVB considers Serbia (Since 2007) as the inheritor of the records of Socialist Federal Republic of Yugoslavia (1948–1991), Federal Republic of Yugoslavia (1992–2002) and Serbia and Montenegro (2003–2006).)	0	1	1	2
16	Thailand	0	1	0	1
17	South Korea	0	0	3	3
18	Croatia	0	0	1	1
18	Dominican Republic	0	0	1	1
18	Greece	0	0	1	1
Totals (20 entries)		34	34	34	102

== MVP by edition ==
- 1984-2006 – Unknown
- 2007 – Nancy Carrillo (CUB)
- 2008 – Wang Yimei (CHN)
- 2009 – Fabiana Claudino (BRA)
- 2010 – Kenia Carcaces (CUB)
- 2011 – Hitomi Nakamichi (JPN)
- 2013 – Fernanda Garay (BRA)
- 2014 – Margareta Kozuch (GER)
- 2015 – Yuki Ishii (JPN)
- 2016 – Hui Ruoqi (CHN)
- 2017 – Ana Carolina da Silva (BRA)
- 2018 – Paola Egonu (ITA)
- 2019 – Malwina Smarzek (POL)

== All-time team records ==
Number of appearances
1	China	7
2	Switzerland	6
3	Brazil	5
4	Germany	5
5	Italy	4
6	Japan	4
7	Russia	4
8	Turkey	4
9	Dominican Republic	3
10	Netherlands	3

Number of matches
1	China	29
2	Switzerland	24
3	Brazil	24
4	Germany	22
5	Japan	20
6	Russia	20
7	Italy	19
8	Turkey	19
9	Thailand	14
10	Netherlands	14

Wins
1	Brazil	17
2	China	14
3	Turkey	14
4	Japan	13
5	Russia	11
6	Germany	10
7	Italy	10
8	Poland	9
9	Netherlands	8
10	Thailand	6

Number of wins in games played
1	United States	80 %
2	Turkey	74 %
3	Brazil	71 %
4	Poland	69 %
5	Japan	65 %
6	Argentina	60 %
7	Netherlands	57 %
8	Russia	55 %
9	Italy	53 %
10	Belgium	50%

Losses
1	Switzerland	24
2	China	15
3	Germany	12
4	Dominican Republic	10
5	Italy	9
6	Russia	9
7	Thailand	8
8	Brazil	7
9	Japan	7
10	Netherlands	6

Number of losses in games played
1	Switzerland	100 %
2	Dominican Republic	77 %
3	Cameroon	75 %
4	Serbia	75 %
5	Thailand	57 %
6	Germany	55 %
7	China	52 %
8	Belgium	50 %
9	Italy	47 %
10	Russia	45 %

(Based on W=2 pts and D=1 pts)

	Team	S	Firs	Best	Pts	MP	W	L	GF	GA	diff
1	China	7	2013	1st	43	29	14	15	56	54	+2
2	Brazil	5	2013	1st	41	24	17	7	63	28	+35
3	Turkey	4	2015	1st	33	19	14	5	47	30	+17
4	Japan	4	2013	2nd	33	20	13	7	44	28	+16
5	Germany	5	2013	1st	32	22	10	12	41	44	-3
6	Russia	4	2013	2nd	31	20	11	9	38	36	+2
7	Italy	4	2013	1st	29	19	10	9	37	32	+5
8	Switzerland	6	2013	-	24	24	0	24	7	72	-65
9	Netherlands	3	2015	3rd	22	14	8	6	35	22	+13
10	Poland	3	2017	1st	22	13	9	4	30	20	+10
11	Thailand	3	2016	2nd	20	14	6	8	23	32	-9
12	Dominican Republic	3	2013	3rd	16	13	3	10	11	32	-21
13	United States	1	2014	2nd	9	5	4	1	13	5	+8
14	Argentina	1	2017	4th	8	5	3	2	11	10	+1
15	Belgium	1	2016	-	6	4	2	2	6	9	-3
16	China U-23	1	2019	-	5	3	2	1	7	6	+1
17	Serbia	1	2016	-	5	4	1	3	8	9	-1
18	Cameroon	1	2018	-	5	4	1	3	3	11	-8

== See also ==
- Memorial of Hubert Jerzy Wagner
- VTV International Women's Volleyball Cup
