= Rachel Bragg =

British volleyball player (born 1984)

Rachel Hutt (ńee Bragg; born 11 December 1984) is a British volleyball player. She competed for Great Britain at the 2012 Summer Olympics.
