= Jennifer Taylor (volleyball) =

English volleyball player (born 1980)

Personal information
- Born: 16 August 1980 (age 45) Bolton, Greater Manchester, England
- Height: 1.79 m (5 ft 10 in)
- Weight: 74 kg (163 lb)

Sport
- Sport: Volleyball
- Club: DOK Dwingeloo

Jennifer Taylor (born 16 August 1980) is an English volleyball player. She competed for Great Britain at the 2012 Summer Olympics.
