= Ciara Michel =

British/American volleyball player (born 1985)

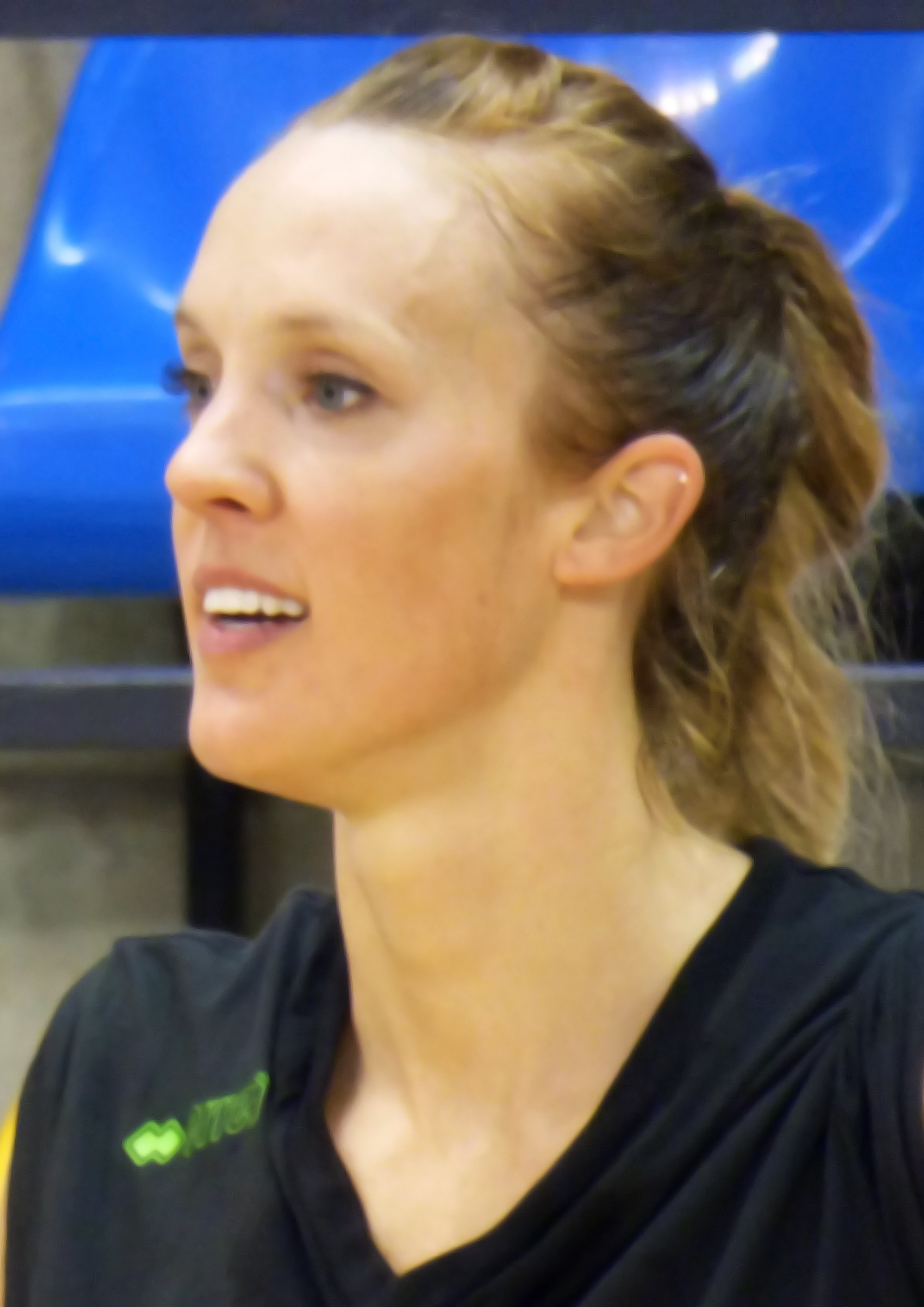

Personal information
- Full name: Ciara Kathleen Michel
- Nationality: British/American
- Born: 2 July 1985 (age 41) Taunton, England, U.K.
- Home town: Miami, Florida, U.S.
- Education: University of Miami
- Height: 1.96 m (6 ft 5 in)
- Weight: 70 kg (150 lb)
- Spike: 320 cm (130 in)
- Block: 310 cm (120 in)

Volleyball information
- Position: Middle Blocker
- Current club: (France) Pays d'Aix Venelles Volley Ball
- Number: 15

National team
- Years: Team
- –: (United Kingdom) Great Britain

Ciara Kathleen Michel (born 2 July 1985) is a British-American volleyball player who plays as a middle blocker. Born in Taunton, Somerset, she learned to play volleyball in Miami, Florida after her parents moved there when she was 10 years old. In Miami she attended Palmer Trinity School, and graduated in 2003, where she has been credited with starting a rich volleyball tradition at the school. She later became a student athlete at the University of Miami from 2004 to 2008, where she was captain, and holds the school record for most career blocks.

After college, she went on to play in Australia for the University Blues of Victoria, while completing a master's degree from the University of Melbourne. She played her first two professional seasons for Alemannia Aachen in Germany (2010–2012).

Michel was selected to represent Great Britain in the 2012 London Olympics where she led her team to a history-making win over Algeria. The team finished in a tie for 8th position.

The next season she joined VT Aurubis, Hamburg. In May 2013, she signed with Yamamay Busto Arsizio near Milan, Italy, making her the first British player in history to compete in the CEV Champions League. The team won 2nd place in the CEV Champions League in 2015.

She spent the 2015–16 season in Turkey's top division for Bursa Büyükşehir Belediyespor, competing in the CEV Challenge Cup.

She then moved to French first division side fr:Association sportive Saint-Raphaël Volley-Ball for the 2016–2017 season, before transferring to another French first division side, fr:ASPTT Mulhouse for the 2017–18 season. She then transferred to fr:Pays d'Aix Venelles Volley Ball for the 2019–2020 season.
