= Grace Carter (volleyball) =

British volleyball player (born 1989)

Personal information
- Nickname: Gracie
- Nationality: British
- Born: 10 August 1989 (age 37)
- Hometown: Nottingham, England
- Height: 1.83 m (6 ft 0 in)
- Weight: 84 kg (185 lb)
- Spike: 310 cm (120 in)
- Block: 291 cm (115 in)
- Education: Sheffield Hallam University

Volleyball information
- Position: Middle Blocker
- Current club: (France) Volley Club Harnésien

National team
(United Kingdom) Great Britain

Grace Carter (born 10 August 1989) is a British volleyball player. She competed for Great Britain at the 2012 Summer Olympics.

== Domestic career ==
Carter's first professional team was Terville Florange Olympique Club, a French team in League AF, the top division for women's volleyball in France. She played for them from 2010 to 2012, when she left the club and joined Saint-Cloud Paris Stade français, another top division team whom she played for and captained until 2016. She then joined Quimper Volley 29, whom she played and captained for until their relegation in 2019. She now plays for Volley Club Harnésien, a second division team.

== International career ==
Carter played volleyball for Great Britain, debuting in 2007 when the team was formed, and also appeared at the 2012 Summer Olympics.
