= Zhang Lei (volleyball) =

Chinese volleyball player

Personal information
- Full name: Zhang Lei
- Nationality: China
- Born: 11 January 1985 (age 41) Shanghai, China
- Home town: Shanghai, China
- Height: 1.81 m (5 ft 11 1/2 in)
- Weight: 71 kg (157 lb)
- Spike: 316 cm (124 in)
- Block: 310 cm (120 in)

Volleyball information
- Position: Opposite
- Current club: retired

Career
- Years: Team
- 2001–2013 2013–2014 2014–2021: (China) Shanghai (Azerbaijan) Igtisadchi Baku (China) Shanghai

National team
- Years: Team
- 2010–2013: (China) CHN
Honours
Women's volleyball
Representing China
FIVB World Cup
Bronze medal – third place	2011 Japan	Team
FIVB World Grand Prix
Silver medal – second place	2013 Japan	Team
Asian Games
Gold medal – first place	2010 Guangzhou	Team
Asian Championship
Gold medal – first place	2011 Taipei	Team
Asian Cup
Silver medal – second place	2012 Almaty	Team
Gold medal – first place	2010 Tai Cang	Team
- Updated on June 2024

Zhang Lei (Chinese: 張磊; pinyin: Zhāng Lěi; born 11 January 1985 in Shanghai) is a retired Chinese volleyball player. She was a member of China women's national volleyball team and competed at the 2012 Summer Olympics, in the opposite position.

== Club career ==
- (China) Shanghai (2001-2013)
- (Azerbaijan) Igtisadchi Baku (2013-2014)
- (China) Shanghai (2014–2021)

== Awards ==
=== Clubs ===
- 2013–14 Azerbaijan Super League - Bronze Medal, with Igtisadchi Baku
