= Ma Yunwen =

Chinese volleyball player (born 1986)

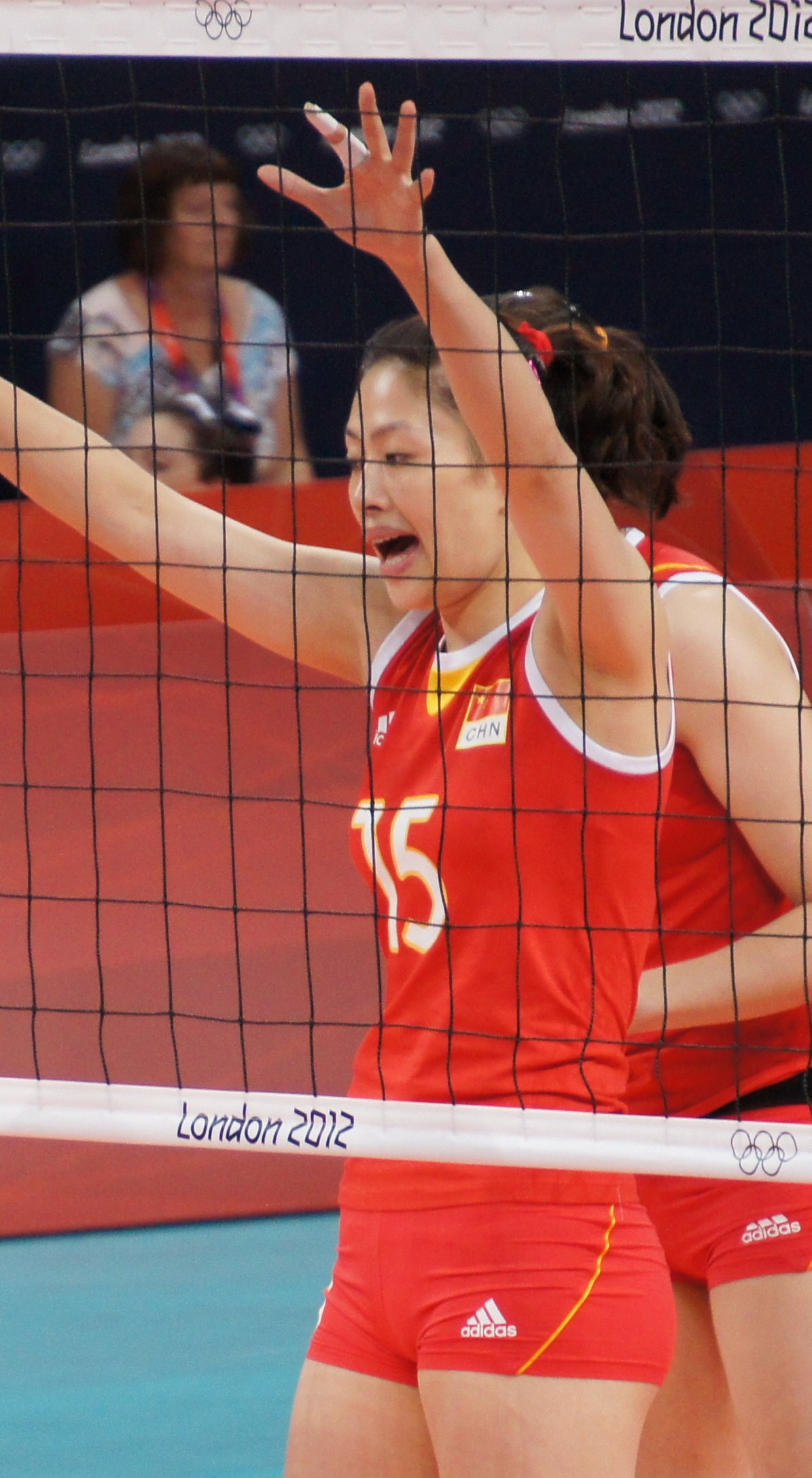
- Ma Yunwen 1.

Personal information
- Full name: Ma Yunwen
- Nickname: Sister Ma
- Nationality: Chinese
- Born: 19 October 1986 (age 40); Shanghai, China
- Hometown: Shanghai, China
- Height: 1.90 m (6 ft 3 in)
- Weight: 67 kg (148 lb)
- Spike: 315 cm (124 in)
- Block: 307 cm (121 in)

Volleyball information
- Position: Middle blocker
- Current club: Igtisadchi Baku
- Number: 15

National team
2005–2013	China
Honours
Women's volleyball
Representing China
Olympic Games
Bronze medal – third place	2008 Beijing	Team
FIVB World Cup
Bronze medal – third place	2011 Japan	Team
FIVB World Grand Prix
Silver medal – second place	2013 Sapporo	Team
Silver medal – second place	2007 Ningbo	Team
Asian Games
Gold medal – first place	2010 Guangzhou	Team
Asian Championship
Gold medal – first place	2005 Taicang	Team
Gold medal – first place	2011 Taipei	Team
Silver medal – second place	2007 Nakhon Ratchasima	Team
Silver medal – second place	2009 Hanoi	Team
Asian Cup
Gold medal – first place	2008 Nakhon Ratchasima	Team
Gold medal – first place	2010 Tai Cang	Team
- Last updated: June 2010

Ma Yunwen (simplified Chinese: 马蕴雯; traditional Chinese: 馬蘊雯; pinyin: Mǎ Yùnwén; born 19 October 1986 in Shanghai) is a Chinese volleyball player.

She was part of the gold medal winning team at the 2005 Asian Championship. She was also part of the Chinese team that won the bronze medal at the 2008 Summer Olympics in Beijing. She won a gold medal at the 2011 Montreux Volley Masters.

== Clubs ==
- (China) Shanghai (2002-2013)
- (Azerbaijan) Igtisadchi Baku (2013-2014)
- (China) Shanghai (2014–2019)

== See also ==
- China at the 2012 Summer Olympics § Volleyball
- Volleyball at the 2012 Summer Olympics – Women's tournament
