= Joanne Morgan (volleyball) =

British volleyball player (born 1983)

Joanne Morgan (born 7 October 1983) is a British volleyball player. She competed for Great Britain at the 2012 Summer Olympics.
