= Audrey Cooper (volleyball) =

British beach volleyball player (born 1964)

Personal information
- Nationality: British
- Born: 7 December 1964 (age 61) Whitburn, Scotland, UK

Sport
- Sport: Beach volleyball

Audrey Cooper (born 7 December 1964) is a British beach volleyball player. She competed in the women's tournament at the 1996 Summer Olympics.
