= Zhang Xian (volleyball) =

Chinese volleyball player

Personal information
- Nationality: Chinese
- Born: 16 March 1985 (age 41) Changle, Fujian, China
- Height: 1.67 m (5 ft 6 in)
- Weight: 57 kg (126 lb)
- Spike: 290 cm (110 in)
- Block: 280 cm (110 in)

Volleyball information

Career
- Years: Team
- 1998–2003 2003–2011 2011–2013 2013 2013–2017: Fujian; Yunnan; Liaoning; Guangdong Evergrande; Yunnan

National team
- Years: Team
- 2007–2013: China

Zhang Xian (born 16 March 1985) is a Chinese retired volleyball player. She is a member of the China women's national volleyball team and played for Liaoning in 2012.

She was part of the Chinese national team at the 2012 Summer Olympics in London, Great Britain.

== Clubs ==
- (China) Fujian (1998–2003) as an outside hitter
- (China) Yunnan (2003–2011) starting as a libero
- (China) Liaoning (2011–2013)
- (China) Guangdong Evergrande (2013) only for 2013 FIVB Volleyball Women's Club World Championship
- (China) Yunnan (2013–2017)

Awards
Preceded by (Brazil) Arlene Xavier (Germany) Kerstin Tzscherlich (Russia) Victoria Kuzyakina	Best Libero of FIVB World Grand Prix; 2007; 2010; 2012	Succeeded by (Japan) Yūko Sano (Russia) Victoria Kuzyakina (Brazil) Fabiana de Oliveira
