= Li Juan (volleyball) =

Chinese volleyball player (born 1981)

Personal information
- Full name: Li Juan
- Nickname: Queen, Jian Jian (尖尖)
- Nationality: Chinese
- Born: 15 May 1981 (age 45); Tianjin, China
- Hometown: Tianjin, China
- Height: 1.86 m (6 ft 1 in)
- Weight: 73 kg (161 lb)
- Spike: 317 cm (125 in)
- Block: 305 cm (120 in)

Volleyball information
- Position: Wing spiker
- Current club: Tianjin Bridgestone
- Number: 10

National team
2002; 2006-2010	China
Honours
Women's volleyball
Representing China
Olympic Games
Bronze medal – third place	2008 Beijing	Team
World Grand Champions Cup
Bronze medal – third place	2005 Japan	Team
FIVB World Grand Prix
Silver medal – second place	2007 Ningbo	Team
Bronze medal – third place	2005 Sendai	Team
Asian Games
Gold medal – first place	2006 Doha	Team
Gold medal – first place	2010 Guangzhou	Team
Asian Championship
Gold medal – first place	2005 Taicang	Team
Silver medal – second place	2007 Nakhon Ratchasima	Team
Silver medal – second place	2009 Hanoi	Team
Asian Cup
Gold medal – first place	2008 Nakhon Ratchasima	Team
Gold medal – first place	2010 Tai Cang	Team
- Last updated: June 2010

Li Juan (Chinese: 李娟; pinyin: Lǐ Juān; born 15 May 1981 in Tianjin) is a female Chinese volleyball player. She was a key part of the gold medal winning teams at the 2005 Asian Championship, 2006 Doha Asian Games and 2010 Guangzhou Asian Games.

Li joined Tianjin Bridgestone in 1998. During more than ten years of professional career, she and her teammates have won eight Chinese Volleyball League titles, two National Games of China titles and three AVC Club Championships titles.

== Career ==
In 2000, Li entered China women's national junior volleyball team.

In 2002, Li was called into China women's national volleyball team for the first time, along with her teammates in Tianjin Bridgestone, Li Shan, Zhang Ping and Zhang Na.

Li participated in the 2008 Beijing Olympics, as a member of China women's national volleyball team, and won the bronze medal.

In the women volleyball final China vs. South Korea of 2010 Guangzhou Asian Games her final strike won the game for China. She won the 2012 Asian Club Championship gold medal.
