= Liu Yanan =

Chinese volleyball player (born 1980)

Personal information
- Full name: Liu Yanan
- Nickname: Beauty
- Born: 29 September 1980 (age 46); Dalian, China
- Hometown: Dalian, China
- Height: 1.86 m (6 ft 1 in)
- Weight: 73 kg (161 lb)
- Spike: 320 cm (130 in)
- Block: 313 cm (123 in)

Volleyball information
- Position: Middle blocker
- Number: 4

Career
Years	Teams
1999–2009	Liaoning Brilliance Auto

National team
2001–2008	China
Honours
Women's volleyball
Representing China
Olympic Games
Gold medal – first place	2004 Athens	Team
Bronze medal – third place	2008 Beijing	Team
FIVB World Cup
Gold medal – first place	2003 Japan	Team
World Grand Champions Cup
Gold medal – first place	2001 Japan	Team
Bronze medal – third place	2005 Japan	Team
FIVB World Grand Prix
Gold medal – first place	2003 Andria	Team
Silver medal – second place	2001 Macau	Team
Silver medal – second place	2002 Hong Kong	Team
Silver medal – second place	2007 Ningbo	Team
Bronze medal – third place	2005 Sendai	Team
Asian Games
Gold medal – first place	2002 Busan	Team
Gold medal – first place	2006 Doha	Team
Asian Championship
Gold medal – first place	2001 Nakhon Ratchasima	Team
Gold medal – first place	2003 Ho Chi Minh City	Team
Gold medal – first place	2005 Taicang	Team
Silver medal – second place	2007 Nakhon Ratchasima	Team
Asian Cup
Gold medal – first place	2008 Nakhon Ratchasima	Team
- Last updated: October 2017

Liu Yanan (simplified Chinese: 刘亚男; traditional Chinese: 劉亞男; pinyin: Liú Yànán; born 29 September 1980) is a retired Chinese volleyball player. She currently plays club ball for Liaoning, and has played for the national team during many of its recent successes.

== National team ==
- 2001 World Grand Champion Cup - Gold Medal
- 2003 World Grand Prix - Gold Medal
- 2003 World Cup - Gold Medal
- 2004 Athens Olympic Games - Gold Medal
- 2008 Beijing Olympic Games - Bronze Medal
