= Song Nina =

Chinese volleyball player (born 1980)

Personal information
- Nationality: Chinese
- Born: April 7, 1980 (age 46); Anshan, China
- Height: 179 cm (5 ft 10 in)

Volleyball information
- Number: 12
Honours
Women's volleyball
Representing China
Olympic Games
Gold medal – first place	2004 Athens	Team
FIVB World Cup
Gold medal – first place	2003 Japan	Team
World Grand Champions Cup
Gold medal – first place	2001 Japan	Team
Bronze medal – third place	2005 Japan	Team
FIVB World Grand Prix
Gold medal – first place	2003 Andria	Team
Silver medal – second place	2001 Macau	Team
Silver medal – second place	2002 Hong Kong	Team
Bronze medal – third place	2005 Sendai	Team
Asian Games
Gold medal – first place	2002 Busan	Team
Gold medal – first place	2006 Doha	Team
Asian Championship
Gold medal – first place	2001 Nakhon Ratchasima	Team
Gold medal – first place	2003 Ho Chi Minh City	Team
Gold medal – first place	2005 Taicang	Team

Song Nina (Chinese: 宋妮娜; born April 7, 1980) is a Chinese volleyball player who competed in the 2004 Summer Olympics.

In 2004, Song was a member of the Chinese team that won the gold medal in the Olympic tournament.
