= Zhou Suhong =

Chinese volleyball player (born 1979)

Personal information
- Full name: Zhou Suhong
- Nickname: Paopao
- Nationality: Chinese
- Born: 23 April 1979 (age 47); Zhejiang, China
- Hometown: Zhejiang, China
- Height: 1.82 m (6 ft 0 in)
- Weight: 73 kg (161 lb)
- Spike: 310 cm (120 in)
- Block: 300 cm (120 in)

Volleyball information
- Position: Opposite
- Number: 7

National team
1999–2008; 2010	China
Honours
Women's volleyball
Representing China
Olympic Games
Gold medal – first place	2004 Athens	Team
Bronze medal – third place	2008 Beijing	Team
FIVB World Cup
Gold medal – first place	2003 Japan	Team
World Grand Champions Cup
Gold medal – first place	2001 Japan	Team
Bronze medal – third place	2005 Japan	Team
FIVB World Grand Prix
Gold medal – first place	2003 Andria	Team
Silver medal – second place	2001 Macau	Team
Silver medal – second place	2002 Hong Kong	Team
Silver medal – second place	2007 Ningbo	Team
Bronze medal – third place	2005 Sendai	Team
Bronze medal – third place	1999 Yuxi	Team
Asian Games
Gold medal – first place	2002 Busan	Team
Gold medal – first place	2006 Doha	Team
Gold medal – first place	2010 Guangzhou	Team
Asian Championship
Gold medal – first place	1999 Hong Kong	Team
Gold medal – first place	2001 Nakhon Ratchasima	Team
Gold medal – first place	2003 Ho Chi Minh City	Team
Gold medal – first place	2005 Taicang	Team
Silver medal – second place	2007 Nakhon Ratchasima	Team
Asian Cup
Gold medal – first place	2008 Nakhon Ratchasima	Team
- Last updated: December 2010

Zhou Suhong (simplified Chinese: 周苏红; traditional Chinese: 周蘇紅; pinyin: Zhōu Sūhóng; born 23 April 1979 in Changzing, Huzhou, Zhejiang) is a Chinese volleyball player, who was a member of the Chinese women's national team that won the gold medal at both the World Cup and the Athens Olympic Games. She is an opposite hitter. She is married to former Chinese men's national volleyball team member Tang Miao. She wears uniform number 7. Her hobbies include music and reading and Zhou is currently studying at Zhejiang University.

== Career ==
Zhou won the 2001 World Grand Champion Cup, the 2003 World Grand Prix, the 2003 World Cup and the 2004 Athens Olympic Games gold medal.

== Clubs ==
- (China) Zhejiang New Century Tourism (1996–2009)
- (China) Guangdong Evergrande (2009–2010)
- (China) Zhejiang New Century Tourism (2010-2013)

== Individual awards ==
- 2003 World Cup "Best Receiver"
- 2004-2005 Chinese League "Most Valuable Player"
- 2004-2005 Chinese League "Best Receiver"
- 2005 Asian Women's Volleyball Championship "Best Receiver"
- 2005 FIVB Women's World Grand Champions Cup "Best Receiver"
- 2005 FIVB Women's World Grand Champions Cup "Best Spiker"
- 2005 FIVB World Grand Prix "Best Receiver"
- 2008 Summer Olympics "Best Receiver"
