= Yang Hao (volleyball) =

Chinese volleyball player

Personal information
- Full name: Yang Hao
- Nickname: Hao Zi
- Born: 21 March 1980 (age 46); Dalian, China
- Hometown: Dalian, China
- Height: 1.83 m (6 ft 0 in)
- Weight: 75 kg (165 lb)
- Spike: 320 cm (130 in)
- Block: 315 cm (124 in)

Volleyball information
- Position: Wing spiker
- Number: 3

National team
2001–2008	China
Honours
Women's volleyball
Representing China
Olympic Games
Gold medal – first place	2004 Athens	Team
Bronze medal – third place	2008 Beijing	Team
FIVB World Cup
Gold medal – first place	2003 Japan	Team
World Grand Champions Cup
Gold medal – first place	2001 Japan	Team
Bronze medal – third place	2005 Japan	Team
FIVB World Grand Prix
Gold medal – first place	2003 Andria	Team
Silver medal – second place	2001 Macau	Team
Silver medal – second place	2002 Hong Kong	Team
Silver medal – second place	2007 Ningbo	Team
Bronze medal – third place	2005 Sendai	Team
Asian Games
Gold medal – first place	2002 Busan	Team
Gold medal – first place	2006 Doha	Team
Asian Championship
Gold medal – first place	2001 Nakhon Ratchasima	Team
Gold medal – first place	2003 Ho Chi Minh City	Team
Gold medal – first place	2005 Taicang	Team
Silver medal – second place	2007 Nakhon Ratchasima	Team
Asian Cup
Gold medal – first place	2008 Nakhon Ratchasima	Team
- Last updated: December 2010

Yang Hao (simplified Chinese: 杨昊; traditional Chinese: 楊昊; pinyin: Yáng Hào; born 21 March 1980) is a retired Chinese female volleyball player. She was a member of the Chinese team that won the gold medal at the 2004 Athens Olympic Games and a bronze medal at the 2008 Beijing Olympic Games.

== Clubs ==
- (China) Liaoning (1994–2000)
- (China) Shanghai (2000–2001)
- (China) Liaoning (2001–2008)
- (Italy) Pallavolo Sirio Perugia (2008–2009)
- (China) Guangdong Evergrande (2009–2010)

== Awards ==
=== Individuals ===
- 2001 FIVB World Grand Champions Cup "Most Valuable Player"
- 2001 FIVB World Grand Champions Cup "Best Spiker"
- 2001 FIVB World Grand Champions Cup "Best Server"
- 2002 FIVB World Grand Prix "Best Scorer"
- 2002 FIVB World Grand Prix "Best Spiker"
- 2002 FIVB World Grand Prix "Best Server"
- 2003 Asian Championship "Most Valuable Player"
- 2003 Asian Championship "Best Scorer"
- 2003 Asian Championship "Best Server"
- 2003 FIVB World Grand Prix "Best Spiker"
- 2003 FIVB World Grand Prix "Best Server"
- 2003-2004 Chinese Volleyball League "Most Valuable Player"
- 2005 FIVB World Grand Prix "Best Spiker"
- 2005 FIVB World Grand Prix "Best Server"
- 2005 Montreux Volley Masters "Best Scorer"
- 2005 Montreux Volley Masters "Best Server"
- 2005-2006 Chinese Volleyball League "Most Valuable Player"
- 2007 FIVB World Grand Prix "Best Server"

=== Clubs ===
- 2000–01 Chinese League - Champion, with Shanghai
- 2005–06 Chinese League - Champion, with Liaoning

Awards
Preceded by (United States) Danielle Scott	Best Scorer of World Grand Prix; 2002	Succeeded by (Russia) Ekaterina Gamova
Preceded by (Cuba) Zoila Barros (United States) Logan Tom (Cuba) Nancy Carrillo	Best Server of World Grand Prix; 2002, 2003; 2005; 2007	Succeeded by (United States) Logan Tom (Cuba) Nancy Carrillo (Japan) Saori Kimura
