= Zhang Yuehong =

Chinese volleyball player (born 1975)

Personal information
- Full name: Zhang Yuehong
- Nickname: Jean
- Born: November 9, 1975 Shenyang, Liaoning, China
- Height: 1.82 m (6 ft 0 in)
- Weight: 75 kg (165 lb)
- Spike: 324 cm (128 in)
- Block: 310 cm (122 in)

Volleyball information
- Position: Wing Spiker
- Current club: Toray Arrows
- Number: 9

National team
- Years: Team
- –: China
Honours
Women's volleyball
Representing China
Olympic Games
Gold medal – first place	2004 Athens	Team
World Cup
Gold medal – first place	2003	Team
World Grand Champions Cup
Gold medal – first place	2001 Japan	Team
FIVB World Grand Prix
Gold medal – first place	2003 Andria	Team
Silver medal – second place	2001 Macau	Team
Silver medal – second place	2002 Hong Kong	Team
Silver medal – second place	2007 Ningbo	Team
Asian Games
Gold medal – first place	2002 Busan	Team
Asian Championship
Gold medal – first place	2001 Nakhon Ratchasima	Team
Gold medal – first place	2003 Ho Chi Minh City	Team
Silver medal – second place	2007 Nakhon Ratchasima	Team

Zhang Yuehong (simplified Chinese: 张越红; traditional Chinese: 張越紅; pinyin: Zhāng Yuèhóng; born November 9, 1975, in Shenyang, Liaoning) is a volleyball player from Liaoning, China. She won a gold medal with the national team in the 2004 Summer Olympics in Athens, Greece.

== Clubs ==
- (China) Liaoning (1993–2002)
- (France) RC Cannes (2002–2003)
- (China) Liaoning (2003–2008)
- (Japan) Toray Arrows (2008–2009)

== Awards ==
=== Individuals ===
- 2008-09 Japanese Premier League "Most Valuable Player"
- 2008-09 Japanese Premier League "Best 6"

=== National team ===
- 2003 FIVB World Cup - Gold Medal
- 2004 Summer Olympics - Gold Medal
