= Zhang Ping (volleyball) =

Chinese volleyball player (born 1982)

Medal record

Women's volleyball

Representing China

Olympic Games
Gold medal – first place	2004 Athens	Team

FIVB World Cup
Gold medal – first place	2003 Japan	Team

World Grand Champions Cup
Bronze medal – third place	2005 Japan	Team

FIVB World Grand Prix
Gold medal – first place	2003 Andria	Team
Silver medal – second place	2002 Hong Kong	Team
Bronze medal – third place	2005 Sendai	Team

Asian Games
Gold medal – first place	2006 Doha	Team

Asian Championship
Gold medal – first place	2003 Ho Chi Minh City	Team
Gold medal – first place	2005 Taicang	Team

Zhang Ping (simplified Chinese: 张萍; traditional Chinese: 張萍; pinyin: Zhāng Píng; born March 23, 1982) is a retired Chinese volleyball player. She was a member of the Chinese national team that won the gold medal in the 2004 Summer Olympics in Athens and was awarded Best Spiker.
