= Chu Jinling =

Chinese volleyball player (born 1984)

Medal record

Women's volleyball

Representing China

World Grand Champions Cup
Bronze medal – third place	2005 Japan	Team

FIVB World Grand Prix
Gold medal – first place	2003 Andria	Team
Bronze medal – third place	2005 Sendai	Team Competition

Asian Championship
Gold medal – first place	2003 Ho Chi Minh City	Team
Gold medal – first place	2005 Taicang	Team
Silver medal – second place	2009 Hanoi	Team

Asian Games
Gold medal – first place	2006 Doha	Team Competition

Chu Jinling (楚金玲; born 29 July 1984 in Dalian) is a retired Chinese volleyball player. Chu currently plays club ball for Liaoning, and has played for the national team during many of its recent successes.

== See also ==
- China at the 2012 Summer Olympics § Volleyball
- Volleyball at the 2012 Summer Olympics – Women's tournament
