= Kiattipong Radchatagriengkai =

Thai volleyball coach (born 1966)

Personal information
- Nickname: Aod
- Born: July 17, 1966 (age 60); Nakhon Ratchasima, Thailand
- Height: 1.95 m (6 ft 5 in)

Volleyball information
- Position: Opposite
- Number: 11

National team
1983–1998	Thailand
Honours
Southeast Asian Games
Gold medal – first place	1985 Bangkok	Player
Bronze medal – third place	1987 Jakarta	Player
Bronze medal – third place	1989 Kuala Lumpur	Player
Silver medal – second place	1991 Manila	Player
Silver medal – second place	1993 Singapore	Player
Gold medal – first place	1995 Chiang Mai	Player
Silver medal – second place	1997 Jakarta	Player
Summer Universiade
Bronze medal – third place	2001 China	Coach
Asian Volleyball Championship
Gold medal – first place	2009 Hanoi	Coach
Gold medal – first place	2013 Nakhon Ratchasima	Coach
Gold medal – first place	2026 Tianjin	Coach
Bronze medal – third place	2001 Nakhonratchasima	Coach
Bronze medal – third place	2007 Nakhonratchasima	Coach
Asian Cup
Gold medal – first place	2012 Almaty	Coach
Silver medal – second place	2010 Taicang	Coach
Bronze medal – third place	2008 Nakhon Ratchasima	Coach
Southeast Asian Games
Gold medal – first place	2001 Kuala Lumpur	Coach
Gold medal – first place	2003 Hanoi	Coach
Gold medal – first place	2005 Manila	Coach
Gold medal – first place	2007 Nakhon Ratchasima	Coach
Gold medal – first place	2009 Vientiane	Coach
Gold medal – first place	2011 Palembang/Jakarta	Coach

Kiattipong Radchatagriengkai (Thai: เกียรติพงษ์ รัชตเกรียงไกร, RTGS: Kiattiphong Ratchatakriangkrai; born July 17, 1966), popularly known as Coach Aod (Thai: โค้ชอ๊อต), was the head coach of the Thailand women's national volleyball team. He got bachelor's degree from Kasetsart University

He was a member of Thailand men's national volleyball team and, following retirement from playing, became a staff coach in Thailand's national volleyball team. Coach Aod learn how to coach volleyball from a Chinese coach before becoming a head coach. In December 2014 he married Feng Kun. In 2016, Coach Aod decided to end his tenure as national team coach to spend more time with his family.

== Awards ==
=== Individuals ===
- 2012 Siamsport Award "Amateur Athletic trainers excellent"

== Career ==
=== As a coach ===
Team	Country	Year
National Team	Thailand	1998–2016, 2024–
Sang Som	Thailand	2006–2008
Federbrau	Thailand	2009–2011
Chang	Thailand	2011–2012
Igtisadchi Baku	Azerbaijan	2012–2013
Beijing	China	2014–2017

== Royal decorations ==
- 2021 – Knight Commander (Second Class) The Most Noble Order of the Crown of Thailand
- 2013 – Commander (Third Class) of The Most Exalted Order of the White Elephant
- 2010 – Companion (Fourth Class) of The Most Admirable Order of the Direkgunabhorn
