= Feng Kun =

Chinese volleyball player

Personal information
- Full name: Feng Kun
- Nickname: Panda
- Nationality: Chinese
- Born: 28 December 1978 (age 47); Beijing, China
- Hometown: Beijing, China
- Height: 1.83 m (6 ft 0 in)
- Weight: 75 kg (165 lb)
- Spike: 319 cm (126 in)
- Block: 310 cm (120 in)

Volleyball information
- Position: Setter
- Number: 2

National team
1997; 2001–2006; 2008	China
Honours
Women's volleyball
Representing China
Olympic Games
Gold medal – first place	2004 Athens	Team
Bronze medal – third place	2008 Beijing	Team
World Cup
Gold medal – first place	2003 Japan	Team
World Grand Champions Cup
Gold medal – first place	2001 Japan	Team
Bronze medal – third place	2005 Japan	Team
FIVB World Grand Prix
Gold medal – first place	2003 Andria	Team
Silver medal – second place	2001 Macau	Team
Silver medal – second place	2002 Hong Kong	Team
Bronze medal – third place	2005 Sendai	Team
Asian Games
Gold medal – first place	2002 Busan	Team
Gold medal – first place	2006 Doha	Team
Asian Championship
Gold medal – first place	2001 Nakhon Ratchasima	Team
Gold medal – first place	2003 Ho Chi Minh City	Team
Gold medal – first place	2005 Taicang	Team
Asian Cup
Gold medal – first place	2008 Nakhon Ratchasima	Team
- Last updated: December 2010

Feng Kun (simplified Chinese: 冯坤; traditional Chinese: 馮坤; pinyin: Féng Kūn; born 28 December 1978) is a retired Chinese volleyball player. She was the setter and captain of the China women's national volleyball team. She was awarded Most Valuable Player and Best Setter at the 2004 Summer Olympics in Athens, Greece, where China won the gold medal in volleyball.

== Career ==
Feng started playing volleyball at the age of 12 and was selected for the Beijing volleyball team at aged 16. A year later she was selected for the national team. At that time the China team was at a low point after years of dominance in the sport. However, the team began to rejuvenate and won the Asian Championship in 2001; came fourth in the World Championship in 2002; won the World Cup in 2003; and went on to win gold medal at the 2004 Olympic Games in Athens, having defeated reigning champion Cuba in the semi-final and come from two sets down in the final to beat Russia.

Feng won the 2008–09 CEV Cup with Asystel Novara and was awarded Best Setter.

After the end of the 2010/11 season of the Chinese Volleyball League playing for Guangdong Evergrande V.C., Feng announced her retirement from professional volleyball.

== Personal life ==
In December 2014, Feng married Kiattipong Radchatagriengkai, who was the head coach of Thailand women's national volleyball team.

== Clubs ==
- (China) Beijing
- (Italy) Asystel Novara (2008–2009)
- (China) Guangdong Evergrande (2009–2011)

== Awards ==
=== Individuals ===
- 2001 Asian Women's Volleyball Championship "Most Valuable Player"
- 2001 Asian Women's Volleyball Championship "Best Setter"
- 2001 FIVB World Grand Prix "Best Setter"
- 2002 FIVB World Grand Prix "Best Setter"
- 2003 FIVB World Grand Prix "Best Setter"
- 2003 Montreux Volley Masters "Best Setter"
- 2004 Olympic Games "Most Valuable Player"
- 2004 Olympic Games "Best Setter"
- 2005 Asian Women's Volleyball Championship "Best Setter"
- 2005 FIVB World Grand Prix "Best Setter"
- 2005 Montreux Volley Masters "Best Setter"
- 2005 FIVB Women's Grand Champions Cup "Best Setter"
- 2008 Montreux Volley Masters "Best Setter"
- 2008–09 CEV Cup "Best Setter"
- 2008–09 CEV Cup "Best Blocker"

=== Clubs ===
- 2008-09 CEV Cup - Champion, with Asystel Novara

Awards
Preceded by (Brazil) Fernanda Venturini	Best Setter of FIVB World Grand Prix; 2005	Succeeded by (Italy) Eleonora Lo Bianco
