= Zhao Ruirui =

Chinese volleyball player

Personal information
- Full name: Zhao Ruirui
- Nationality: Chinese
- Born: 8 October 1981 (age 45); Nanjing, China
- Hometown: Nanjing, China
- Height: 1.97 m (6 ft 6 in)
- Weight: 75 kg (165 lb)
- Spike: 326 cm (128 in)
- Block: 315 cm (124 in)

Volleyball information
- Position: Middle blocker
- Current club: Army
- Number: 9

National team
1999-2004; 2008	China
Honours
Women's volleyball
Representing China
Olympic Games
Gold medal – first place	2004 Athens	Team
Bronze medal – third place	2008 Beijing	Team
FIVB World Cup
Gold medal – first place	2003 Japan	Team
World Grand Champions Cup
Gold medal – first place	2001 Japan	Team
FIVB World Grand Prix
Gold medal – first place	2003 Andria	Team
Silver medal – second place	2001 Macau	Team
Silver medal – second place	2002 Hong Kong	Team
Bronze medal – third place	1999 Yuxi	Team
Asian Games
Gold medal – first place	2002 Busan	Team
Asian Championship
Gold medal – first place	1999 Hong Kong	Team
Gold medal – first place	2001 Nakhon Ratchasima	Team
Gold medal – first place	2003 Ho Chi Minh City	Team
Asian Cup
Gold medal – first place	2008 Nakhon Ratchasima	Team
- Last updated: Dec 2010

Zhao Ruirui (Chinese: 赵蕊蕊; pinyin: Zhào Ruǐruǐ; born 8 October 1981 in Nanjing, Jiangsu, China) is a Chinese former volleyball player who competed in the 2003 FIVB Volleyball Women's World Cup winning side and made an initial appearance with the 2004 gold medal-winning side before refracturing her right leg. Following her retirement in 2009 from sports competition, she has become a successful sci-fi author and published several critically acclaimed novels. Her sci-fi novel (The Wing Man) won the Silver Award of the 4th Global Chinese Nebula Award in 2013.

== Career ==
Zhao won the 2001 World Grand Champion Cup and the 2003 World Grand Prix 2003 gold medals. She also won the 2003 World Cup and the 2004 Athens Olympic Games 2004 gold medals and the 2008 Beijing Olympic Games 2008 bronze medal.

== Awards ==
=== Individuals ===
- 2003 Asian Women's Volleyball Championship "Most Valuable Player"
- 2003 Asian Women's Volleyball Championship "Best Blocker"
- 2003 FIVB World Cup "Best Spiker"
