= 1993 Asian Women's Volleyball Championship =

International indoor volleyball tournament

Tournament details
- Host country: China
- City: Shanghai
- Dates: 24–30 July
- Teams: 14 (from 1 confederation)
- Venue: 1 (in 1 host city)

Final positions
- Champions: China (5th title)
- Runners-up: Japan
- Third place: South Korea
- Fourth place: Chinese Taipei

The 1993 Asian Women's Volleyball Championship was the seventh Asian Championship, a biennial international volleyball tournament organised by the Asian Volleyball Confederation (AVC) with Chinese Volleyball Association (CVA). The tournament was held in Shanghai, China from 24 to 30 July 1993.

== Pools composition ==
The teams are seeded based on their final ranking at the 1991 Asian Women's Volleyball Championship.

Pool A	Pool B	Pool C	Pool D
China (Host & 1st); Indonesia (9th); Hong Kong	Japan (2nd); Thailand (7th); New Zealand	South Korea (3rd); Australia (6th); Uzbekistan; Sri Lanka	North Korea (4th); Chinese Taipei (5th); Kazakhstan; Philippines

== Preliminary round ==
=== Pool A ===
Pos	Team	Pld	W	L	Pts	SW	SL	SR	SPW	SPL	SPR	Qualification
1	China	2	2	0	4	6	0	MAX	0	0	—	Quarterfinals
2	Indonesia	2	1	1	3	0	0	—	0	0	—	Quarterfinals
3	Hong Kong	2	0	2	2	0	0	—	0	0	—	

Date		Score		Set 1	Set 2	Set 3	Set 4	Set 5	Total
24 Jul	Indonesia	0–3	China						
25 Jul	Hong Kong	?–3	Indonesia						
26 Jul	China	3–0	Hong Kong	15–0	15–2	15–0			45–2

=== Pool B ===
Pos	Team	Pld	W	L	Pts	SW	SL	SR	SPW	SPL	SPR	Qualification
1	Japan	2	2	0	4	6	0	MAX	90	13	6.923	Quarterfinals
2	Thailand	2	1	1	3	3	3	1.000	0	0	—	Quarterfinals
3	New Zealand	2	0	2	2	0	6	0.000	0	0	—	

Date		Score		Set 1	Set 2	Set 3	Set 4	Set 5	Total
24 Jul	New Zealand	0–3	Japan	1–15	4–15	1–15			6–45
25 Jul	Thailand	3–0	New Zealand						
26 Jul	Japan	3–0	Thailand	15–4	15–2	15–1			45–7

=== Pool C ===
Pos	Team	Pld	W	L	Pts	SW	SL	SR	SPW	SPL	SPR	Qualification
1	South Korea	3	3	0	6	9	0	MAX	135	31	4.355	Quarterfinals
2	Uzbekistan	3	2	1	5	6	4	1.500	115	93	1.237	Quarterfinals
3	Australia	3	1	2	4	4	6	0.667	100	115	0.870	
4	Sri Lanka	3	0	3	3	0	9	0.000	24	135	0.178	

Date		Score		Set 1	Set 2	Set 3	Set 4	Set 5	Total
24 Jul	Australia	0–3	South Korea	6–15	0–15	11–15			17–45
24 Jul	Uzbekistan	3–0	Sri Lanka	15–5	15–0	15–5			45–10
25 Jul	Sri Lanka	0–3	Australia	3–15	6–15	2–15			11–45
25 Jul	South Korea	3–0	Uzbekistan	15–2	15–5	15–4			45–11
26 Jul	Uzbekistan	3–1	Australia	13–15	16–14	15–9	15–0		59–38
26 Jul	Sri Lanka	0–3	South Korea	0–15	2–15	1–15			3–45

=== Pool D ===
Pos	Team	Pld	W	L	Pts	SW	SL	SR	SPW	SPL	SPR	Qualification
1	Chinese Taipei	3	3	0	6	9	2	4.500	0	0	—	Quarterfinals
2	Kazakhstan	3	2	1	5	7	0	MAX	0	0	—	Quarterfinals
3	North Korea	3	1	2	4	0	6	0.000	0	0	—	
4	Philippines	3	0	3	3	0	9	0.000	0	0	—	

Date		Score		Set 1	Set 2	Set 3	Set 4	Set 5	Total
24 Jul	Philippines	0–3	Kazakhstan	4–15	3–15	5–15			12–45
24 Jul	Chinese Taipei	3–1	North Korea	15–8	15–?	15–17	15–9		60–?
25 Jul	North Korea	?–3	Kazakhstan						
25 Jul	Chinese Taipei	3–0	Philippines						
26 Jul	North Korea	3–0	Philippines						
26 Jul	Kazakhstan	1–3	Chinese Taipei	13–15	8–15	15–9	12–15		48–54

== Quarterfinals ==
- The results and the points of the matches between the same teams that were already played during the preliminary round shall be taken into account for the Quarterfinals.

=== Pool E ===
Pos	Team	Pld	W	L	Pts	SW	SL	SR	SPW	SPL	SPR	Qualification
1	China	3	3	0	6	9	1	9.000	0	0	—	Semifinals
2	South Korea	3	2	1	5	7	3	2.333	126	70	1.800	Semifinals
3	Uzbekistan	3	1	2	4	3	0	MAX	0	0	—	
4	Indonesia	3	0	3	3	0	9	0.000	0	0	—	

Date		Score		Set 1	Set 2	Set 3	Set 4	Set 5	Total
27 Jul	South Korea	3–0	Indonesia	15–1	15–4	15–1			45–6
27 Jul	China	3–0	Uzbekistan	15–2	15–4	15–1			45–7
28 Jul	Indonesia	?–3	Uzbekistan						
28 Jul	China	3–1	South Korea	8–15	15–5	15–7	15–9		53–36

=== Pool F ===
Pos	Team	Pld	W	L	Pts	SW	SL	SR	SPW	SPL	SPR	Qualification
1	Japan	3	3	0	6	9	0	MAX	135	42	3.214	Semifinals
2	Chinese Taipei	3	2	1	5	6	4	1.500	118	107	1.103	Semifinals
3	Kazakhstan	3	1	2	4	4	0	MAX	0	0	—	
4	Thailand	3	0	3	3	0	9	0.000	0	0	—	

Date		Score		Set 1	Set 2	Set 3	Set 4	Set 5	Total
27 Jul	Japan	3–0	Kazakhstan	15–0	15–6	15–10			45–16
27 Jul	Chinese Taipei	3–0	Thailand	15–3	15–8	15–3			45–14
28 Jul	Thailand	?–3	Kazakhstan						
28 Jul	Japan	3–0	Chinese Taipei	15–6	15–7	15–6			45–19

=== Pool G ===
Pos	Team	Pld	W	L	Pts	SW	SL	SR	SPW	SPL	SPR
1	Australia	2	2	0	4	6	0	MAX	90	29	3.103
2	Hong Kong	2	1	1	3	0	0	—	0	0	—
3	Sri Lanka	2	0	2	2	0	0	—	0	0	—

Date		Score		Set 1	Set 2	Set 3	Set 4	Set 5	Total
27 Jul	Hong Kong	3–?	Sri Lanka						
28 Jul	Hong Kong	0–3	Australia	5–15	10–15	3–15			18–45

=== Pool H ===
Pos	Team	Pld	W	L	Pts	SW	SL	SR	SPW	SPL	SPR
1	North Korea	2	2	0	4	0	0	—	0	0	—
2	New Zealand	2	1	1	3	0	0	—	0	0	—
3	Philippines	2	0	2	2	0	0	—	0	0	—

Date		Score		Set 1	Set 2	Set 3	Set 4	Set 5	Total
27 Jul	New Zealand	3–?	Philippines						
28 Jul	New Zealand	?–3	North Korea						

== Classification 5th–14th ==
=== 13th place ===
Date		Score		Set 1	Set 2	Set 3	Set 4	Set 5	Total
	Sri Lanka	?–3	Philippines						

=== 11th place ===
Date		Score		Set 1	Set 2	Set 3	Set 4	Set 5	Total
	Hong Kong	?–3	New Zealand						

=== 9th place ===
Date		Score		Set 1	Set 2	Set 3	Set 4	Set 5	Total
	Australia	0–3	North Korea	8–15	10–15	3–15			21–45

=== 7th place ===
Date		Score		Set 1	Set 2	Set 3	Set 4	Set 5	Total
	Indonesia	?–3	Thailand						

=== 5th place ===
Date		Score		Set 1	Set 2	Set 3	Set 4	Set 5	Total
	Uzbekistan	?–3	Kazakhstan						

== Final round ==
Semifinals
29 July – Shanghai
China	3
Chinese Taipei	0
29 July – Shanghai
Japan	3
South Korea	0

Final
30 July – Shanghai
China	3
Japan	0
3rd place
30 July – Shanghai
Chinese Taipei	0
South Korea	3

=== Semifinals ===
Date		Score		Set 1	Set 2	Set 3	Set 4	Set 5	Total
29 Jul	China	3–0	Chinese Taipei	15–0	15–7	15–?			45–?
29 Jul	Japan	3–0	South Korea	15–11	15–12	15–5			45–28

=== 3rd place ===
Date		Score		Set 1	Set 2	Set 3	Set 4	Set 5	Total
30 Jul	Chinese Taipei	0–3	South Korea	3–15	6–15	6–15			15–45

=== Final ===
Date		Score		Set 1	Set 2	Set 3	Set 4	Set 5	Total
30 Jul	China	3–0	Japan	15–5	15–9	15–9			45–23

== Final standing ==
Rank	Team
1st place, gold medalist(s)	China
2nd place, silver medalist(s)	Japan
3rd place, bronze medalist(s)	South Korea
4	Chinese Taipei
5	Kazakhstan
6	Uzbekistan
7	Thailand
8	Indonesia
9	North Korea
10	Australia
11	New Zealand
12	Hong Kong
13	Philippines
14	Sri Lanka

Qualified for the 1993 World Grand Champions Cup and 1994 World Championship

1993 Asian Women's champions

China
5th title
