= Li Shan (volleyball) =

Chinese volleyball player (born 1980)

Personal information
- Full name: Lǐ Shān
- Nickname: 李珊
- Nationality: Chinese
- Born: May 21, 1980 (age 46); Beijing, People's Republic of China

Volleyball information
- Number: 6
Honours
Women's volleyball
Representing China
Olympic Games
Gold medal – first place	2004 Athens	Team
FIVB Volleyball Women's World Cup
Gold medal – first place	2003 Japan	Team
World Grand Champions Cup
Gold medal – first place	2001 Japan	Team
FIVB World Grand Prix
Gold medal – first place	2003 Andria	Team
Silver medal – second place	2001 Macau	Team
Silver medal – second place	2002 Hong Kong	Team
Asian Games
Gold medal – first place	2002 Busan	Team
Gold medal – first place	2006 Doha	Team
Asian Championship
Gold medal – first place	2001 Nakhon Ratchasima	Team
Gold medal – first place	2003 Ho Chi Minh City	Team

Li Shan (Chinese: 李珊; pinyin: Lǐ Shān; born 21 May 1980) is a Chinese volleyball player who competed in the 2000 Summer Olympics and in the 2004 Summer Olympics.
