= 1975 Asian Women's Volleyball Championship =

International indoor volleyball tournament

Tournament details
- Host country: Australia
- City: Melbourne
- Dates: 17–28 August
- Teams: 5 (from 1 confederation)
- Venues: 2 (in 1 host city)

Final positions
- Champions: Japan (1st title)
- Runners-up: South Korea
- Third place: China
- Fourth place: Australia

The 1975 Asian Women's Volleyball Championship was the inaugural edition of the Asian Championship, a quadrennial international volleyball tournament organised by the Asian Volleyball Confederation (AVC) with Australian Volleyball Federation (AVF). The tournament was held in Melbourne, Australia from 17 to 28 August 1975.

== Results ==
Pos	Team	Pld	W	L	Pts	SW	SL	SR	SPW	SPL	SPR
1	Japan	4	4	0	8	12	0	MAX	0	0	—
2	South Korea	4	3	1	7	9	4	2.250	0	0	—
3	China	4	2	2	6	7	6	1.167	0	0	—
4	Australia	4	1	3	5	3	9	0.333	0	0	—
5	New Zealand	4	0	4	4	0	12	0.000	0	0	—

Date		Score		Set 1	Set 2	Set 3	Set 4	Set 5	Total
17 Aug	Japan	3–0	Australia	15–4	15–0	15–2			45–6
18 Aug	Australia	3–0	New Zealand	15–9	15–2	15–5			45–16
22 Aug	Japan	3–0	China	15–1	15–1	15–4			45–6
23 Aug	South Korea	3–0	Australia	15–7	15–0	15–0			45–7
	South Korea	3–1	China	11–15	15–6	15–10	15–4		56–35
	New Zealand	0–3	Japan						
	New Zealand	0–3	South Korea						
	China	3–0	New Zealand						
27 Aug	China	3–0	Australia	15–1	15–7	15–6			45–14
28 Aug	Japan	3–0	South Korea	15–4	15–1	17–15			47–20

== Final standing ==
Rank	Team
1st place, gold medalist(s)	Japan
2nd place, silver medalist(s)	South Korea
3rd place, bronze medalist(s)	China
4	Australia
5	New Zealand

Qualified for the 1976 Summer Olympics

1975 Asian Women's champions

Japan
1st title
