= 1997 Asian Women's Volleyball Championship =

International indoor volleyball tournament

Tournament details
- Host country: Philippines
- City: Manila
- Dates: 21–28 September
- Teams: 9 (from 1 confederation)
- Venue: 1 (in 1 host city)

Final positions
- Champions: China (7th title)
- Runners-up: South Korea
- Third place: Japan
- Fourth place: Chinese Taipei

The 1997 Asian Women's Volleyball Championship was the ninth edition of the Asian Championship, a biennial international volleyball tournament organised by the Asian Volleyball Confederation (AVC) with Philippine Volleyball Federation (PVF). The tournament was held in Manila, Philippines from 21 to 28 September 1997.

== Pools composition ==
The teams are seeded based on their final ranking at the 1995 Asian Women's Volleyball Championship.

Pool A	Pool B
Philippines (Host); Japan (3rd); Chinese Taipei; Australia	China (1st); South Korea (2nd); Thailand; Uzbekistan; Hong Kong

== Preliminary round ==
=== Pool A ===
Pos	Team	Pld	W	L	Pts	SW	SL	SR	SPW	SPL	SPR	Qualification
1	Japan	3	3	0	6	9	1	9.000	148	40	3.700	Semifinals
2	Chinese Taipei	3	2	1	5	7	3	2.333	115	72	1.597	Semifinals
3	Australia	3	1	2	4	3	7	0.429	61	130	0.469	5th–8th place
4	Philippines	3	0	3	3	1	9	0.111	61	143	0.427	5th–8th place

Date	Time		Score		Set 1	Set 2	Set 3	Set 4	Set 5	Total
21 Sep	14:00	Philippines	1–3	Australia	8–15	10–15	15–8	7–15		40–53
21 Sep	15:30	Japan	3–1	Chinese Taipei	15–6	15–4	13–15	15–0		58–25
23 Sep	13:00	Japan	3–0	Australia	15–1	15–1	15–2			45–4
23 Sep	14:30	Chinese Taipei	3–0	Philippines	15–4	15–4	15–2			45–10
25 Sep	13:00	Philippines	0–3	Japan	1–15	6–15	4–15			11–45
25 Sep	14:30	Australia	0–3	Chinese Taipei	1–15	0–15	3–15			4–45

=== Pool B ===
Pos	Team	Pld	W	L	Pts	SW	SL	SR	SPW	SPL	SPR	Qualification
1	China	4	4	0	8	12	0	MAX	180	42	4.286	Semifinals
2	South Korea	4	3	1	7	9	3	3.000	145	78	1.859	Semifinals
3	Thailand	4	2	2	6	6	6	1.000	131	114	1.149	5th–8th place
4	Uzbekistan	4	1	3	5	3	9	0.333	77	156	0.494	5th–8th place
5	Hong Kong	4	0	4	4	0	12	0.000	37	180	0.206	

Date	Time		Score		Set 1	Set 2	Set 3	Set 4	Set 5	Total
21 Sep	17:00	Thailand	3–0	Hong Kong	15–2	15–3	15–3			45–8
21 Sep	18:30	China	3–0	South Korea	15–5	15–1	15–4			45–10
22 Sep	14:00	Hong Kong	0–3	China	1–15	1–15	2–15			4–45
22 Sep	16:00	Uzbekistan	0–3	Thailand	7–15	5–15	4–15			16–45
23 Sep	16:00	China	3–0	Uzbekistan	15–2	15–1	15–2			45–5
23 Sep	17:30	South Korea	3–0	Hong Kong	15–0	15–3	15–1			45–4
24 Sep	14:00	Uzbekistan	0–3	South Korea	7–15	3–15	1–15			11–45
24 Sep	16:00	Thailand	0–3	China	4–15	7–15	12–15			23–45
25 Sep	16:00	South Korea	3–0	Thailand	15–4	15–8	15–6			45–18
25 Sep	17:30	Hong Kong	0–3	Uzbekistan	7–15	7–15	7–15			21–45

== Final round ==
- The results and the points of the matches between the same teams that were already played during the preliminary round shall be taken into account for the final round.

=== Classification 5th–8th ===
Pos	Team	Pld	W	L	Pts	SW	SL	SR	SPW	SPL	SPR
5	Thailand	3	3	0	6	9	0	MAX	135	38	3.553
6	Uzbekistan	3	2	1	5	6	3	2.000	102	91	1.121
7	Australia	3	1	2	4	3	7	0.429	77	130	0.592
8	Philippines	3	0	3	3	1	9	0.111	88	143	0.615

Date	Time		Score		Set 1	Set 2	Set 3	Set 4	Set 5	Total
27 Sep	13:00	Australia	0–3	Uzbekistan	9–15	6–15	4–15			19–45
27 Sep	14:30	Philippines	0–3	Thailand	7–15	4–15	10–15			21–45
28 Sep	13:00	Philippines	0–3	Uzbekistan	6–15	8–15	13–15			27–45
28 Sep	14:30	Australia	0–3	Thailand	1–15	4–15	0–15			5–45

=== Championship ===
Pos	Team	Pld	W	L	Pts	SW	SL	SR	SPW	SPL	SPR
1	China	3	3	0	6	9	0	MAX	136	48	2.833
2	South Korea	3	2	1	5	6	3	2.000	100	82	1.220
3	Japan	3	1	2	4	3	7	0.429	99	115	0.861
4	Chinese Taipei	3	0	3	3	1	9	0.111	59	149	0.396

Date	Time		Score		Set 1	Set 2	Set 3	Set 4	Set 5	Total
27 Sep	16:00	Japan	0–3	South Korea	4–15	5–15	10–15			19–45
27 Sep	17:30	Chinese Taipei	0–3	China	1–15	1–15	14–16			16–46
28 Sep	16:00	Chinese Taipei	0–3	South Korea	5–15	3–15	10–15			18–45
28 Sep	17:30	Japan	0–3	China	7–15	9–15	6–15			22–45

== Final standing ==
Rank	Team
1st place, gold medalist(s)	China
2nd place, silver medalist(s)	South Korea
3rd place, bronze medalist(s)	Japan
4	Chinese Taipei
5	Thailand
6	Uzbekistan
7	Australia
8	Philippines
9	Hong Kong

Qualified for the 1997 World Grand Champions Cup

1997 Asian Women's champions

China
7th title

== Awards ==
- Best scorer: (China) Sun Yue
- Best spiker: (China) Sun Yue
