= Xue Ming =

Chinese volleyball player (born 1987)

Personal information
- Full name: Xue Ming
- Nickname: Tu Zi
- Nationality: Chinese
- Born: 23 February 1987 (age 39) Beijing, China
- Home town: Beijing, China
- Height: 1.92 m (6 ft 4 in)
- Weight: 68 kg (150 lb)
- Spike: 322 cm (127 in)
- Block: 310 cm (120 in)

Volleyball information
- Position: Middle blocker
- Current club: Beijing
- Number: 12

National team
- Years: Team
- 2005–2011: China
Honours
Women's volleyball
Representing China
Olympic Games
Bronze medal – third place	2008 Beijing	Team
FIVB World Grand Prix
Silver medal – second place	2007 Ningbo	Team
Asian Games
Gold medal – first place	2010 Guangzhou	Team
Asian Championship
Gold medal – first place	2005 Taicang	Team
Silver medal – second place	2007 Nakhon Ratchasima	Team
Silver medal – second place	2009 Hanoi	Team
Asian Cup
Gold medal – first place	2008 Nakhon Ratchasima	Team
Gold medal – first place	2010 Tai Cang	Team
- Updated on June 2010

Xue Ming (Chinese: 薛明; pinyin: Xuē Míng; born 23 February 1987 in Beijing) is a female Chinese volleyball player. She was part of the gold medal-winning team at the 2005 Asian Championship.

== Awards ==
=== Individuals ===
- 2009 Montreux Volley Masters "Best Spiker"
