= 2001 FIVB Volleyball Women's World Grand Champions Cup =

Women's volleyball tournament

2001 World Grand Champions Cup

Tournament details
- Host country: Japan
- Dates: November 13–18
- Teams: 6
- Venues: 2 (in 2 host cities)

Final positions
- Champions: China (1st title)

Tournament awards
- MVP: Yang Hao

The 2001 FIVB Women's World Grand Champions Cup was held in Saitama and Fukuoka, Japan from November 13 to November 18, 2001.

== Teams ==
Team	Qualified as
Japan	Host Nation
China	2001 Asian Champions
United States	2001 NORCECA Champions
Brazil	2001 South American Champions
Russia	2001 European Champions
South Korea	Wild Card

== Competition formula ==
The competition formula of the 2001 Women's World Grand Champions Cup is the single Round-Robin system. Each team plays once against each of the 5 remaining teams. Points are accumulated during the whole tournament, and the final standing is determined by the total points gained.

== Venues ==
- Saitama Super Arena (Saitama)
- Marine Messe (Fukuoka)

== Results ==
Pos	Team	Pld	W	L	Pts	SW	SL	SR	SPW	SPL	SPR
1	China	5	5	0	10	15	3	5.000	453	378	1.198
2	Russia	5	3	2	8	11	8	1.375	458	407	1.125
3	Japan	5	3	2	8	9	8	1.125	388	388	1.000
4	Brazil	5	2	3	7	9	11	0.818	439	443	0.991
5	United States	5	1	4	6	8	13	0.615	467	495	0.943
6	South Korea	5	1	4	6	4	13	0.308	315	409	0.770

=== Saitama round ===
Date	Time		Score		Set 1	Set 2	Set 3	Set 4	Set 5	Total	Report
13 Nov	14:00	South Korea	3–1	United States	25–18	25–21	19–25	25–23		94–87	P2
13 Nov	16:00	China	3–1	Russia	33–35	25–21	25–19	27–25		110–100	P2
13 Nov	19:00	Japan	3–0	Brazil	26–24	25–20	25–22			76–66	P2
14 Nov	14:00	United States	1–3	China	20–25	25–22	22–25	22–25		89–97	P2
14 Nov	16:00	Brazil	2–3	Russia	25–21	20–25	30–28	16–25	10–15	101–114	P2
14 Nov	19:00	Japan	3–1	South Korea	22–25	25–18	25–23	25–19		97–85	P2

=== Fukuoka round ===
Date	Time		Score		Set 1	Set 2	Set 3	Set 4	Set 5	Total	Report
16 Nov	13:00	Russia	1–3	United States	25–18	22–25	20–25	27–29		94–97	P2
16 Nov	15:00	South Korea	0–3	Brazil	21–25	14–25	15–25			50–75	P2
16 Nov	18:00	China	3–0	Japan	25–21	25–21	25–21			75–63	P2
17 Nov	13:00	Japan	0–3	Russia	17–25	23–25	13–25			53–75	P2
17 Nov	15:00	Brazil	3–2	United States	25–17	21–25	20–25	25–22	20–18	111–107	P2
17 Nov	18:00	South Korea	0–3	China	13–25	15–25	12–25			40–75	P2
18 Nov	13:00	Russia	3–0	South Korea	25–14	25–18	25–14			75–46	P2
18 Nov	15:00	China	3–1	Brazil	25–21	25–17	21–25	25–23		96–86	P2
18 Nov	18:00	United States	1–3	Japan	20–25	26–24	23–25	18–25		87–99	P2

== Final standing ==
Rank	Team
1st place, gold medalist(s)	China
2nd place, silver medalist(s)	Russia
3rd place, bronze medalist(s)	Japan
4	Brazil
5	United States
6	South Korea

2001 FIVB Women's World Grand Champions Cup champions

China
First title

Team Roster
Zhang Jing, Feng Kun, Yang Hao, Liu Yanan, Li Shan, Zhou Suhong, Zhao Ruirui, Zhang Yuehong, Chen Jing, Song Nina, Xiong Zi, Lin Hanying
Head Coach: Chen Zhonghe

== Awards ==
- MVP: (China) Yang Hao
- Best scorer: (Russia) Yekaterina Gamova
- Best spiker: (Russia) Elizaveta Tishchenko
- Best blocker: (Russia) Yekaterina Gamova
- Best server: (Japan) Miyuki Takahashi
- Best setter: (Russia) Tatyana Gracheva
- Best digger: (United States) Stacy Sykora
- Best receiver: (Brazil) Virna Dias
