= 2009 Asian Women's Volleyball Championship =

International indoor volleyball tournament

Tournament details
- Host country: Vietnam
- City: Hanoi
- Dates: 5–13 September
- Teams: 14 (from 1 confederation)
- Venue: 1 (in 1 host city)

Final positions
- Champions: Thailand (1st title)
- Runners-up: China
- Third place: Japan
- Fourth place: South Korea

Tournament awards
- MVP: (Thailand) Onuma Sittirak

The 2009 Asian Women's Volleyball Championship was the fifteenth edition of the Asian Championship, a biennial international volleyball tournament organised by the Asian Volleyball Confederation (AVC) with Volleyball Federation of Vietnam (VFV). The tournament was held in Hanoi, Vietnam from 5 to 13 September 2009.

== Venues ==
- Quan Ngua Competition Hall (Hanoi)

== Pools composition ==
The teams are seeded based on their final ranking at the 2007 Asian Women's Volleyball Championship.

Pool A	Pool B	Pool C	Pool D
Vietnam (Host & 7th); Australia (8th); Iran; Sri Lanka	Japan (1st); Chinese Taipei (6th); Uzbekistan; ~~Maldives~~ *	China (2nd); Kazakhstan (5th); Hong Kong; ~~Afghanistan~~ *	Thailand (3rd); South Korea (4th); India; Indonesia

* Withdrew

== Preliminary round ==
=== Pool A ===
Pos	Team	Pld	W	L	Pts	SW	SL	SR	SPW	SPL	SPR	Qualification
1	Vietnam	3	3	0	6	9	0	MAX	225	138	1.630	Pool E
2	Iran	3	2	1	5	6	4	1.500	215	213	1.009	Pool E
3	Australia	3	1	2	4	4	6	0.667	199	206	0.966	Pool G
4	Sri Lanka	3	0	3	3	0	9	0.000	145	227	0.639	Pool G

Date	Time		Score		Set 1	Set 2	Set 3	Set 4	Set 5	Total	Report
05 Sep	16:00	Iran	3–0	Sri Lanka	25–18	25–15	27–25			77–58	Report
05 Sep	19:00	Vietnam	3–0	Australia	25–11	25–14	25–19			75–44	Report
06 Sep	10:00	Australia	3–0	Sri Lanka	25–16	25–10	25–10			75–36	Report
06 Sep	20:00	Vietnam	3–0	Iran	25–11	25–18	25–14			75–43	Report
07 Sep	12:00	Iran	3–1	Australia	25–21	25–18	20–25	25–16		95–80	Report
07 Sep	18:00	Sri Lanka	0–3	Vietnam	13–25	17–25	21–25			51–75	Report

=== Pool B ===
Pos	Team	Pld	W	L	Pts	SW	SL	SR	SPW	SPL	SPR	Qualification
1	Japan	2	2	0	4	6	0	MAX	150	63	2.381	Pool F
2	Chinese Taipei	2	1	1	3	3	3	1.000	107	122	0.877	Pool F
3	Uzbekistan	2	0	2	2	0	6	0.000	78	150	0.520	Pool H

Date	Time		Score		Set 1	Set 2	Set 3	Set 4	Set 5	Total	Report
05 Sep	21:00	Japan	3–0	Chinese Taipei	25–13	25–10	25–9			75–32	Report
06 Sep	14:00	Uzbekistan	0–3	Japan	7–25	18–25	6–25			31–75	Report
07 Sep	10:00	Chinese Taipei	3–0	Uzbekistan	25–19	25–7	25–21			75–47	Report

=== Pool C ===
Pos	Team	Pld	W	L	Pts	SW	SL	SR	SPW	SPL	SPR	Qualification
1	China	2	2	0	4	6	0	MAX	150	74	2.027	Pool E
2	Kazakhstan	2	1	1	3	3	3	1.000	125	115	1.087	Pool E
3	Hong Kong	2	0	2	2	0	6	0.000	64	150	0.427	Pool G

Date	Time		Score		Set 1	Set 2	Set 3	Set 4	Set 5	Total	Report
05 Sep	14:00	China	3–0	Kazakhstan	25–14	25–17	25–19			75–50	Report
06 Sep	16:00	Hong Kong	0–3	Kazakhstan	9–25	15–25	16–25			40–75	Report
07 Sep	14:00	China	3–0	Hong Kong	25–7	25–8	25–9			75–24	Report

=== Pool D ===
Pos	Team	Pld	W	L	Pts	SW	SL	SR	SPW	SPL	SPR	Qualification
1	South Korea	3	3	0	6	9	2	4.500	258	206	1.252	Pool F
2	Thailand	3	2	1	5	8	3	2.667	256	183	1.399	Pool F
3	India	3	1	2	4	3	8	0.375	197	249	0.791	Pool H
4	Indonesia	3	0	3	3	2	9	0.222	183	256	0.715	Pool H

Date	Time		Score		Set 1	Set 2	Set 3	Set 4	Set 5	Total	Report
05 Sep	10:00	Indonesia	0–3	South Korea	14–25	15–25	18–25			47–75	Report
05 Sep	12:00	India	0–3	Thailand	10–25	15–25	13–25			38–75	Report
06 Sep	12:00	India	3–2	Indonesia	17–25	24–26	25–22	25–17	15–8	106–98	Report
06 Sep	18:00	Thailand	2–3	South Korea	23–25	21–25	25–19	25–23	12–15	106–107	Report
07 Sep	16:00	Indonesia	0–3	Thailand	8–25	11–25	19–25			38–75	Report
07 Sep	20:00	South Korea	3–0	India	25–9	26–24	25–20			76–53	Report

== Classification round ==
- The results and the points of the matches between the same teams that were already played during the preliminary round shall be taken into account for the classification round.

=== Pool E ===
Pos	Team	Pld	W	L	Pts	SW	SL	SR	SPW	SPL	SPR	Qualification
1	China	3	3	0	6	9	0	MAX	225	127	1.772	Quarterfinals
2	Kazakhstan	3	2	1	5	6	4	1.500	225	195	1.154	Quarterfinals
3	Vietnam	3	1	2	4	4	6	0.667	192	218	0.881	Quarterfinals
4	Iran	3	0	3	3	0	9	0.000	123	225	0.547	Quarterfinals

Date	Time		Score		Set 1	Set 2	Set 3	Set 4	Set 5	Total	Report
09 Sep	14:00	China	3–0	Iran	25–11	25–18	25–11			75–40	Report
09 Sep	18:00	Vietnam	1–3	Kazakhstan	13–25	25–27	25–23	17–25		80–100	Report
10 Sep	18:00	Iran	0–3	Kazakhstan	16–25	9–25	15–25			40–75	Report
10 Sep	20:00	Vietnam	0–3	China	15–25	10–25	12–25			37–75	Report

=== Pool F ===
Pos	Team	Pld	W	L	Pts	SW	SL	SR	SPW	SPL	SPR	Qualification
1	Japan	3	3	0	6	9	1	9.000	248	162	1.531	Quarterfinals
2	South Korea	3	2	1	5	7	5	1.400	261	255	1.024	Quarterfinals
3	Thailand	3	1	2	4	5	6	0.833	232	220	1.055	Quarterfinals
4	Chinese Taipei	3	0	3	3	0	9	0.000	121	225	0.538	Quarterfinals

Date	Time		Score		Set 1	Set 2	Set 3	Set 4	Set 5	Total	Report
09 Sep	16:00	Japan	3–0	Thailand	25–16	25–15	25–20			75–51	Report
09 Sep	20:00	South Korea	3–0	Chinese Taipei	25–14	25–16	25–21			75–51	Report
10 Sep	14:00	Japan	3–1	South Korea	25–13	23–25	25–20	25–21		98–79	Report
10 Sep	16:00	Chinese Taipei	0–3	Thailand	16–25	9–25	13–25			38–75	Report

=== Pool G ===
Pos	Team	Pld	W	L	Pts	SW	SL	SR	SPW	SPL	SPR	Qualification
1	Australia	2	2	0	4	6	2	3.000	179	135	1.326	9th–12th place
2	Hong Kong	2	1	1	3	5	3	1.667	178	177	1.006	9th–12th place
3	Sri Lanka	2	0	2	2	0	6	0.000	109	154	0.708	13th–14th place

Date	Time		Score		Set 1	Set 2	Set 3	Set 4	Set 5	Total	Report
09 Sep	10:00	Hong Kong	3–0	Sri Lanka	26–24	25–23	28–26			79–73	Report
10 Sep	10:00	Australia	3–2	Hong Kong	25–23	25–14	18–25	21–25	15–12	104–99	Report

=== Pool H ===
Pos	Team	Pld	W	L	Pts	SW	SL	SR	SPW	SPL	SPR	Qualification
1	India	2	2	0	4	6	4	1.500	216	198	1.091	9th–12th place
2	Uzbekistan	2	1	1	3	5	5	1.000	216	217	0.995	9th–12th place
3	Indonesia	2	0	2	2	4	6	0.667	205	222	0.923	13th–14th place

Date	Time		Score		Set 1	Set 2	Set 3	Set 4	Set 5	Total	Report
09 Sep	12:00	Uzbekistan	3–2	Indonesia	33–35	25–21	18–25	25–13	15–13	116–107	Report
10 Sep	12:00	Uzbekistan	2–3	India	25–19	17–25	25–22	16–25	17–19	100–110	Report

== Classification 13th–14th ==
Date	Time		Score		Set 1	Set 2	Set 3	Set 4	Set 5	Total	Report
13 Sep	10:00	Sri Lanka	1–3	Indonesia	17–25	25–22	17–25	18–25		77–97	Report

== Classification 9th–12th ==
9th–12th places
11 September – Hanoi
Australia	3
Uzbekistan	0
11 September – Hanoi
India	2
Hong Kong	3

9th place
12 September – Hanoi
Australia	3
Hong Kong	0
11th place
12 September – Hanoi
Uzbekistan	0
India	3

=== Semifinals ===
Date	Time		Score		Set 1	Set 2	Set 3	Set 4	Set 5	Total	Report
11 Sep	10:00	Australia	3–0	Uzbekistan	25–18	25–19	25–14			75–51	Report
11 Sep	12:00	India	2–3	Hong Kong	22–25	17–25	25–21	25–15	12–15	101–101	Report

=== 11th place ===
Date	Time		Score		Set 1	Set 2	Set 3	Set 4	Set 5	Total	Report
12 Sep	10:00	Uzbekistan	0–3	India	21–25	16–25	15–25			52–75	Report

=== 9th place ===
Date	Time		Score		Set 1	Set 2	Set 3	Set 4	Set 5	Total	Report
12 Sep	12:00	Australia	3–0	Hong Kong	25–23	25–18	25–11			75–52	Report

== Final round ==
Quarterfinals
11 September – Hanoi
China	3
Chinese Taipei	0
11 September – Hanoi
South Korea	3
Vietnam	0
11 September – Hanoi
Japan	3
Iran	0
11 September – Hanoi
Kazakhstan	1
Thailand	3

Semifinals
12 September – Hanoi
China	3
South Korea	1
12 September – Hanoi
Japan	1
Thailand	3

Final
13 September – Hanoi
China	1
Thailand	3
3rd place
13 September – Hanoi
South Korea	0
Japan	3

5th–8th places
12 September – Hanoi
Chinese Taipei	3
Vietnam	1
12 September – Hanoi
Iran	0
Kazakhstan	3

5th place
13 September – Hanoi
Chinese Taipei	0
Kazakhstan	3
7th place
13 September – Hanoi
Vietnam	3
Iran	0

=== Quarterfinals ===
Date	Time		Score		Set 1	Set 2	Set 3	Set 4	Set 5	Total	Report
11 Sep	14:00	China	3–0	Chinese Taipei	25–16	25–9	25–14			75–39	Report
11 Sep	16:00	Japan	3–0	Iran	25–11	25–6	25–7			75–24	Report
11 Sep	18:00	Kazakhstan	1–3	Thailand	25–27	21–25	26–24	22–25		94–101	Report
11 Sep	20:00	South Korea	3–0	Vietnam	25–20	25–21	25–18			75–59	Report

=== 5th–8th semifinals ===
Date	Time		Score		Set 1	Set 2	Set 3	Set 4	Set 5	Total	Report
12 Sep	14:00	Iran	0–3	Kazakhstan	11–25	20–25	14–25			45–75	Report
12 Sep	18:00	Chinese Taipei	3–1	Vietnam	23–25	25–20	25–21	25–22		98–88	Report

=== Semifinals ===
Date	Time		Score		Set 1	Set 2	Set 3	Set 4	Set 5	Total	Report
12 Sep	16:00	Japan	1–3	Thailand	25–20	13–25	23–25	21–25		82–95	Report
12 Sep	20:00	China	3–1	South Korea	25–18	25–19	21–25	25–14		96–76	Report

=== 7th place ===
Date	Time		Score		Set 1	Set 2	Set 3	Set 4	Set 5	Total	Report
13 Sep	15:00	Vietnam	3–0	Iran	25–16	25–16	25–22			75–54	Report

=== 5th place ===
Date	Time		Score		Set 1	Set 2	Set 3	Set 4	Set 5	Total	Report
13 Sep	12:30	Chinese Taipei	0–3	Kazakhstan	23–25	21–25	15–25			59–75	Report

=== 3rd place ===
Date	Time		Score		Set 1	Set 2	Set 3	Set 4	Set 5	Total	Report
13 Sep	17:30	South Korea	0–3	Japan	16–25	15–25	18–25			49–75	Report

=== Final ===
Date	Time		Score		Set 1	Set 2	Set 3	Set 4	Set 5	Total	Report
13 Sep	20:00	China	1–3	Thailand	25–20	19–25	19–25	23–25		86–95	Report

== Final standing ==
Rank	Team
1st place, gold medalist(s)	Thailand
2nd place, silver medalist(s)	China
3rd place, bronze medalist(s)	Japan
4	South Korea
5	Kazakhstan
6	Chinese Taipei
7	Vietnam
8	Iran
9	Australia
10	Hong Kong
11	India
12	Uzbekistan
13	Indonesia
14	Sri Lanka

Qualified for the 2009 World Grand Champions Cup and 2010 World Grand Prix
Qualified for the 2010 World Grand Prix

2009 Asian Women's champions

Thailand
1st title

Team Roster
Wanna Buakaew, Pleumjit Thinkaow, Onuma Sittirak, Utaiwan Kaensing, Wilavan Apinyapong, Amporn Hyapha, Kamonporn Sukmak, Nootsara Tomkom, Malika Kanthong, Wanitchaya Luangtonglang, Em-orn Phanusit, Tapaphaipun Chaisri
Head Coach: Kiattipong Radchatagriengkai

== Awards ==
- MVP: (Thailand) Onuma Sittirak
- Best scorer: (South Korea) Kim Yeon-koung
- Best spiker: (China) Xue Ming
- Best blocker: (China) Xue Ming
- Best server: (Japan) Saori Kimura
- Best setter: (Thailand) Nootsara Tomkom
- Best libero: (Thailand) Wanna Buakaew
