= 1995 Asian Women's Volleyball Championship =

International indoor volleyball tournament

Tournament details
- Host country: Thailand
- City: Chiang Mai
- Dates: 25 September – 2 October
- Teams: 9 (from 1 confederation)
- Venue: 1 (in 1 host city)

Final positions
- Champions: China (6th title)
- Runners-up: South Korea
- Third place: Japan
- Fourth place: Chinese Taipei

The 1995 Asian Women's Volleyball Championship was the eighth edition of the Asian Championship, a biennial international volleyball tournament organised by the Asian Volleyball Confederation (AVC) with Thailand Volleyball Association (TVA). The tournament was held in Chiang Mai, Thailand from 25 September to 2 October 1995.

== Pools composition ==
The teams are seeded based on their final ranking at the 1993 Asian Women's Volleyball Championship.

Pool A	Pool B
Thailand (Host); South Korea (3rd); Chinese Taipei; New Zealand; Hong Kong	China (1st); Japan (2nd); Philippines; Australia

== Preliminary round ==
=== Pool A ===
Pos	Team	Pld	W	L	Pts	SW	SL	SR	SPW	SPL	SPR	Qualification
1	South Korea	4	4	0	8	0	0	—	0	0	—	Championship round
2	Chinese Taipei	4	3	1	7	0	0	—	0	0	—	Championship round
3	Thailand	4	2	2	6	0	0	—	0	0	—	5th–8th classification
4	New Zealand	4	1	3	5	0	0	—	0	0	—	5th–8th classification
5	Hong Kong	4	0	4	4	0	0	—	0	0	—	

Date		Score		Set 1	Set 2	Set 3	Set 4	Set 5	Total
25 Sep	Thailand	3–0	New Zealand	15–1	15–3	15–1			45–5
25 Sep	Chinese Taipei	3–0	Hong Kong	15–3	15–2	15–0			45–5

=== Pool B ===
Pos	Team	Pld	W	L	Pts	SW	SL	SR	SPW	SPL	SPR	Qualification
1	China	3	3	0	6	0	0	—	0	0	—	Championship round
2	Japan	3	2	1	5	0	0	—	0	0	—	Championship round
3	Australia	3	1	2	4	3	6	0.500	61	110	0.555	5th–8th classification
4	Philippines	3	0	3	3	0	9	0.000	0	0	—	5th–8th classification

Date		Score		Set 1	Set 2	Set 3	Set 4	Set 5	Total
25 Sep	Japan	3–0	Australia	15–4	15–3	15–4			45–11
27 Sep	Australia	0–3	China	3–15	1–15	1–15			5–45
29 Sep	Australia	3–0	Philippines	15–4	15–3	15–13			45–20

== Final round ==
- The results and the points of the matches between the same teams that were already played during the preliminary round shall be taken into account for the final round.

=== Classification 5th–8th ===
Pos	Team	Pld	W	L	Pts	SW	SL	SR	SPW	SPL	SPR
5	Thailand	3	3	0	6	9	0	MAX	0	0	—
6	Australia	3	2	1	5	6	3	2.000	119	84	1.417
7	New Zealand	3	1	2	4	0	0	—	0	0	—
8	Philippines	3	0	3	3	0	0	—	0	0	—

Date		Score		Set 1	Set 2	Set 3	Set 4	Set 5	Total
01 Oct	Thailand	3–0	Philippines						
01 Oct	Australia	3–0	New Zealand	15–11	15–4	15–2			45–17
02 Oct	New Zealand	1–3	Philippines	5-15	8-15	15-9	11-15		
02 Oct	Thailand	3–0	Australia	17–15	15–12	15–2			47–29

=== Championship ===
Pos	Team	Pld	W	L	Pts	SW	SL	SR	SPW	SPL	SPR
1	China	3	3	0	6	0	0	—	0	0	—
2	South Korea	3	2	1	5	0	0	—	0	0	—
3	Japan	3	1	2	4	0	0	—	0	0	—
4	Chinese Taipei	3	0	3	3	0	0	—	0	0	—

Date		Score		Set 1	Set 2	Set 3	Set 4	Set 5	Total
01 Oct	South Korea	3–0	Japan	15–9	15–9	15–5			45–23
01 Oct	China	3–?	Chinese Taipei						
02 Oct	Chinese Taipei	0–3	Japan	2-15	13-15	2-15			
02 Oct	South Korea	1–3	China	14–16	7–15	15–11	9–15		45–57

== Final standing ==
Rank	Team
1st place, gold medalist(s)	China
2nd place, silver medalist(s)	South Korea
3rd place, bronze medalist(s)	Japan
4	Chinese Taipei
5	Thailand
6	Australia
7	New Zealand
8	Philippines
9	Hong Kong

Qualified for the 1995 World Cup
Qualified for the 1995 World Cup and 1995 Asian Olympic Qualification
Qualified for the 1995 Asian Olympic Qualification

1995 Asian Women's champions

China
6th title
