= 1999 Asian Women's Volleyball Championship =

International indoor volleyball tournament

Tournament details
- Host country: Hong Kong
- City: Hong Kong
- Dates: 21–26 September
- Teams: 9 (from 1 confederation)
- Venue: 1 (in 1 host city)

Final positions
- Champions: China (8th title)
- Runners-up: South Korea
- Third place: Japan
- Fourth place: Thailand

The 1999 Asian Women's Volleyball Championship was the tenth edition of the Asian Championship, a biennial international volleyball tournament organised by the Asian Volleyball Confederation (AVC) with Volleyball Association of Hong Kong, China (VBAHK). The tournament was held in Hong Kong, China from 21 to 26 September 1999.

== Pools composition ==
The teams are seeded based on their final ranking at the 1997 Asian Women's Volleyball Championship.

| Pool A | Pool B |
|---|---|
| Hong Kong (Host); Japan (3rd); Chinese Taipei; Thailand | China (1st); South Korea (2nd); Kazakhstan; Uzbekistan; Australia |

== Preliminary round ==
=== Pool A ===
| Pos | Team | Pld | W | L | Pts | SW | SL | SR | SPW | SPL | SPR | Qualification |
|---|---|---|---|---|---|---|---|---|---|---|---|---|
| 1 | Japan | 3 | 3 | 0 | 6 | 9 | 1 | 9.000 | 247 | 153 | 1.614 | Semifinals |
| 2 | Thailand | 3 | 2 | 1 | 5 | 7 | 3 | 2.333 | 232 | 203 | 1.143 | Semifinals |
| 3 | Chinese Taipei | 3 | 1 | 2 | 4 | 3 | 6 | 0.500 | 194 | 175 | 1.109 | 5th–8th place |
| 4 | Hong Kong | 3 | 0 | 3 | 3 | 0 | 9 | 0.000 | 83 | 225 | 0.369 | 5th–8th place |

| Date | Time | | Score | | Set 1 | Set 2 | Set 3 | Set 4 | Set 5 | Total |
|---|---|---|---|---|---|---|---|---|---|---|
| 19 Sep | 13:30 | Hong Kong | 0–3 | Chinese Taipei | 6–25 | 3–25 | 11–25 | | | 20–75 |
| 19 Sep | 15:30 | Japan | 3–1 | Thailand | 22–25 | 25–18 | 25–17 | 25–17 | | 97–77 |
| 20 Sep | 13:30 | Chinese Taipei | 0–3 | Thailand | 24–26 | 17–25 | 27–29 | | | 68–80 |
| 20 Sep | 18:00 | Hong Kong | 0–3 | Japan | 10–25 | 9–25 | 6–25 | | | 25–75 |
| 22 Sep | 13:30 | Japan | 3–0 | Chinese Taipei | 25–16 | 25–13 | 25–22 | | | 75–51 |
| 22 Sep | 18:00 | Thailand | 3–0 | Hong Kong | 25–16 | 25–8 | 25–14 | | | 75–38 |

=== Pool B ===
| Pos | Team | Pld | W | L | Pts | SW | SL | SR | SPW | SPL | SPR | Qualification |
|---|---|---|---|---|---|---|---|---|---|---|---|---|
| 1 | China | 4 | 4 | 0 | 8 | 12 | 2 | 6.000 | 343 | 242 | 1.417 | Semifinals |
| 2 | South Korea | 4 | 3 | 1 | 7 | 11 | 3 | 3.667 | 347 | 230 | 1.509 | Semifinals |
| 3 | Uzbekistan | 4 | 1 | 3 | 5 | 5 | 10 | 0.500 | 260 | 335 | 0.776 | 5th–8th place |
| 4 | Australia | 4 | 1 | 3 | 5 | 5 | 11 | 0.455 | 260 | 350 | 0.743 | 5th–8th place |
| 5 | Kazakhstan | 4 | 1 | 3 | 5 | 4 | 11 | 0.364 | 283 | 336 | 0.842 | |

| Date | Time | | Score | | Set 1 | Set 2 | Set 3 | Set 4 | Set 5 | Total |
|---|---|---|---|---|---|---|---|---|---|---|
| 19 Sep | 18:00 | China | 3–0 | Uzbekistan | 25–6 | 25–18 | 25–13 | | | 75–37 |
| 19 Sep | 20:00 | South Korea | 3–0 | Australia | 25–8 | 25–10 | 25–15 | | | 75–33 |
| 20 Sep | 15:30 | Uzbekistan | 0–3 | South Korea | 15–25 | 12–25 | 10–25 | | | 37–75 |
| 20 Sep | 20:00 | Kazakhstan | 0–3 | China | 12–25 | 17–25 | 13–25 | | | 42–75 |
| 21 Sep | 18:00 | South Korea | 3–0 | Kazakhstan | 25–10 | 25–16 | 25–16 | | | 75–42 |
| 21 Sep | 20:00 | Australia | 3–2 | Uzbekistan | 12–25 | 20–25 | 25–10 | 25–18 | 15–11 | 97–89 |
| 22 Sep | 15:30 | Kazakhstan | 3–2 | Australia | 25–16 | 25–13 | 23–25 | 23–25 | 15–10 | 111–89 |
| 22 Sep | 20:00 | China | 3–2 | South Korea | 31–29 | 19–25 | 21–25 | 25–23 | 22–20 | 118–122 |
| 23 Sep | 18:00 | Australia | 0–3 | China | 11–25 | 15–25 | 15–25 | | | 41–75 |
| 23 Sep | 20:00 | Uzbekistan | 3–1 | Kazakhstan | 22–25 | 25–23 | 25–20 | 25–20 | | 97–88 |

== Final round ==
- The results and the points of the matches between the same teams that were already played during the preliminary round shall be taken into account for the final round.

=== Classification 5th–8th ===
| Pos | Team | Pld | W | L | Pts | SW | SL | SR | SPW | SPL | SPR |
|---|---|---|---|---|---|---|---|---|---|---|---|
| 5 | Chinese Taipei | 3 | 3 | 0 | 6 | 9 | 0 | MAX | 225 | 113 | 1.991 |
| 6 | Australia | 3 | 2 | 1 | 5 | 6 | 5 | 1.200 | 224 | 208 | 1.077 |
| 7 | Uzbekistan | 3 | 1 | 2 | 4 | 5 | 6 | 0.833 | 205 | 204 | 1.005 |
| 8 | Hong Kong | 3 | 0 | 3 | 3 | 0 | 9 | 0.000 | 96 | 225 | 0.427 |

| Date | Time | | Score | | Set 1 | Set 2 | Set 3 | Set 4 | Set 5 | Total |
|---|---|---|---|---|---|---|---|---|---|---|
| 25 Sep | 13:30 | Chinese Taipei | 3–0 | Australia | 25–17 | 25–17 | 25–18 | | | 75–52 |
| 25 Sep | 15:30 | Uzbekistan | 3–0 | Hong Kong | 25–13 | 25–12 | 25–7 | | | 75–32 |
| 26 Sep | 13:30 | Hong Kong | 0–3 | Australia | 14–25 | 17–25 | 13–25 | | | 44–75 |
| 26 Sep | 15:30 | Chinese Taipei | 3–0 | Uzbekistan | 25–15 | 25–13 | 25–13 | | | 75–41 |

=== Championship ===
| Pos | Team | Pld | W | L | Pts | SW | SL | SR | SPW | SPL | SPR |
|---|---|---|---|---|---|---|---|---|---|---|---|
| 1 | China | 3 | 3 | 0 | 6 | 9 | 4 | 2.250 | 307 | 284 | 1.081 |
| 2 | South Korea | 3 | 2 | 1 | 5 | 8 | 3 | 2.667 | 272 | 212 | 1.283 |
| 3 | Japan | 3 | 1 | 2 | 4 | 4 | 7 | 0.571 | 234 | 247 | 0.947 |
| 4 | Thailand | 3 | 0 | 3 | 3 | 2 | 9 | 0.222 | 196 | 266 | 0.737 |

| Date | Time | | Score | | Set 1 | Set 2 | Set 3 | Set 4 | Set 5 | Total |
|---|---|---|---|---|---|---|---|---|---|---|
| 25 Sep | 18:00 | Japan | 0–3 | South Korea | 16–25 | 13–25 | 22–25 | | | 51–75 |
| 25 Sep | 20:00 | China | 3–1 | Thailand | 19–25 | 25–20 | 25–19 | 25–12 | | 94–76 |
| 26 Sep | 18:00 | Thailand | 0–3 | South Korea | 9–25 | 19–25 | 15–25 | | | 43–75 |
| 26 Sep | 20:00 | Japan | 1–3 | China | 19–25 | 25–20 | 23–25 | 19–25 | | 86–95 |

== Final standing ==
| Rank | Team |
|---|---|
| 1st place, gold medalist(s) | China |
| 2nd place, silver medalist(s) | South Korea |
| 3rd place, bronze medalist(s) | Japan |
| 4 | Thailand |
| 5 | Chinese Taipei |
| 6 | Australia |
| 7 | Uzbekistan |
| 8 | Hong Kong |
| 9 | Kazakhstan |

| Qualified for the 1999 World Cup and 2000 Olympic Qualifier |

1999 Asian Women's champions

China
8th title
