= Lin Hanying =

Chinese volleyball player (born 1978)

Personal information
- Nationality: Chinese
- Born: 20 July 1978 (age 48)
- Height: 184 cm (72 in)
- Weight: 71 kg (157 lb)

National team
2001	China

Lin Hanying (born 20 July 1978) is a retired Chinese female volleyball player. She was part of the China women's national volleyball team.

She participated in the 1997 FIVB Volleyball World Grand Prix.
