= Sri Lanka women's national volleyball team =

National sports team

Sri Lanka
- Association: Volleyball Association of Sri Lanka
- Confederation: AVC
- Head coach: Sumith Jayalal
- FIVB ranking: 83 ▲4 (2 October 2026)

Uniforms
Home	Away
- www.vbahk.org.hk

The Sri Lanka women's national volleyball team represents Sri Lanka in international women's volleyball competitions and friendly matches.

It appeared at the Women's Asian Volleyball Championship 9 times, its best position was 10th place at the 2007 event.

== Competition history ==
=== CAVA Nations League ===
- (Nepal) 2024 – 4th place

=== CAVA Challenge Cup ===
- (Nepal) 2023 – 5th place

=== AVC Central Asia Zone Championship ===
- (Bangladesh) 2021 – Bronze medal

=== South Asian Games ===
- (Nepal) 1999 – Silver medal
- (India) 2016 – Silver medal
- (Nepal) 2019 – Bronze medal

== Team ==
The following is the roster for the 2017 Asian Women's Volleyball Championship.

Head coach: Sumith Jayalal

Name	Club
Dinesha Prasadani (C)	Sri Lanka Air Force
Iresha Surangani Perera	Sri Lanka Army
Hasini Lakhika	Sri Lanka Army
Apsara Sewmali Seneviatne	Sri Lanka Army
Ayesha Madurika	Sri Lanka Army
Vasana Madumali	Sri Lanka Ports Authority
Thilini Wasana Perera	Sri Lanka Army
Chathurika Gayani	Sri Lanka Air Force
Kanchana Dilhani Wijekoon	Sri Lanka Army
Sanjeevani Karunaratne	Sri Lanka Army
Ashani Chamodika Jayatunga	Sri Lanka Air Force
Dilisha Sanjeevani	Sri Lanka Navy
