= 2007 Asian Women's Volleyball Championship =

International indoor volleyball tournament

Tournament details
- Host country: Thailand
- City: Nakhon Ratchasima
- Dates: 5–13 September
- Teams: 13 (from 1 confederation)
- Venue: 1 (in 1 host city)

Final positions
- Champions: Japan (3rd title)
- Runners-up: China
- Third place: Thailand
- Fourth place: South Korea

Tournament awards
- MVP: (Japan) Miyuki Takahashi

The 2007 Asian Women's Volleyball Championship was the fourteenth edition of the Asian Championship, a biennial international volleyball tournament organised by the Asian Volleyball Confederation (AVC) with Thailand Volleyball Association (TVA). The tournament was held in Nakhon Ratchasima, Thailand from 5 to 13 September 2007.

== Venues ==
- MCC Hall, The Mall Nakhon Ratchasima, Nakhon Ratchasima, Thailand

== Pools composition ==
The teams are seeded based on their final ranking at the 2005 Asian Women's Volleyball Championship.

| Pool A | Pool B | Pool C | Pool D |
|---|---|---|---|
| Thailand (Host & 6th); Australia (10th); ~~Tajikistan~~ * | China (1st); Vietnam (8th); Sri Lanka | Kazakhstan (2nd); Chinese Taipei (5th); Iran; New Zealand | Japan (3rd); South Korea (4th); Uzbekistan; Indonesia |

* Withdrew

== Preliminary round ==
=== Pool A ===
| Pos | Team | Pld | W | L | Pts | SW | SL | SR | SPW | SPL | SPR | Qualification |
|---|---|---|---|---|---|---|---|---|---|---|---|---|
| 1 | Thailand | 1 | 1 | 0 | 2 | 3 | 0 | MAX | 75 | 36 | 2.083 | Pool E |
| 2 | Australia | 1 | 0 | 1 | 1 | 0 | 3 | 0.000 | 36 | 75 | 0.480 | Pool E |

| Date | Time | | Score | | Set 1 | Set 2 | Set 3 | Set 4 | Set 5 | Total |
|---|---|---|---|---|---|---|---|---|---|---|
| 05 Sep | 16:00 | Thailand | 3–0 | Australia | 25–13 | 25–11 | 25–12 | | | 75–36 |

=== Pool B ===
| Pos | Team | Pld | W | L | Pts | SW | SL | SR | SPW | SPL | SPR | Qualification |
|---|---|---|---|---|---|---|---|---|---|---|---|---|
| 1 | China | 2 | 2 | 0 | 4 | 6 | 0 | MAX | 150 | 60 | 2.500 | Pool F |
| 2 | Vietnam | 2 | 1 | 1 | 3 | 3 | 3 | 1.000 | 115 | 105 | 1.095 | Pool F |
| 3 | Sri Lanka | 2 | 0 | 2 | 2 | 0 | 6 | 0.000 | 50 | 150 | 0.333 | Pool H |

| Date | Time | | Score | | Set 1 | Set 2 | Set 3 | Set 4 | Set 5 | Total |
|---|---|---|---|---|---|---|---|---|---|---|
| 05 Sep | 10:00 | Vietnam | 3–0 | Sri Lanka | 25–11 | 25–9 | 25–10 | | | 75–30 |
| 06 Sep | 15:30 | China | 3–0 | Vietnam | 25–14 | 25–11 | 25–15 | | | 75–40 |
| 07 Sep | 12:00 | Sri Lanka | 0–3 | China | 6–25 | 6–25 | 8–25 | | | 20–75 |

=== Pool C ===
| Pos | Team | Pld | W | L | Pts | SW | SL | SR | SPW | SPL | SPR | Qualification |
|---|---|---|---|---|---|---|---|---|---|---|---|---|
| 1 | Kazakhstan | 3 | 3 | 0 | 6 | 9 | 0 | MAX | 225 | 140 | 1.607 | Pool E |
| 2 | Chinese Taipei | 3 | 2 | 1 | 5 | 6 | 3 | 2.000 | 204 | 157 | 1.299 | Pool E |
| 3 | New Zealand | 3 | 1 | 2 | 4 | 3 | 7 | 0.429 | 183 | 243 | 0.753 | Pool G |
| 4 | Iran | 3 | 0 | 3 | 3 | 1 | 9 | 0.111 | 175 | 247 | 0.709 | Pool G |

| Date | Time | | Score | | Set 1 | Set 2 | Set 3 | Set 4 | Set 5 | Total |
|---|---|---|---|---|---|---|---|---|---|---|
| 05 Sep | 11:30 | New Zealand | 0–3 | Chinese Taipei | 19–25 | 6–25 | 13–25 | | | 38–75 |
| 05 Sep | 20:00 | Kazakhstan | 3–0 | Iran | 25–10 | 25–16 | 25–12 | | | 75–38 |
| 06 Sep | 11:30 | Kazakhstan | 3–0 | New Zealand | 25–15 | 25–16 | 25–17 | | | 75–48 |
| 06 Sep | 13:30 | Chinese Taipei | 3–0 | Iran | 25–10 | 25–13 | 25–21 | | | 75–44 |
| 07 Sep | 10:00 | New Zealand | 3–1 | Iran | 25–23 | 25–20 | 20–25 | 27–25 | | 97–93 |
| 07 Sep | 13:30 | Chinese Taipei | 0–3 | Kazakhstan | 22–25 | 16–25 | 16–25 | | | 54–75 |

=== Pool D ===
| Pos | Team | Pld | W | L | Pts | SW | SL | SR | SPW | SPL | SPR | Qualification |
|---|---|---|---|---|---|---|---|---|---|---|---|---|
| 1 | Japan | 3 | 3 | 0 | 6 | 9 | 0 | MAX | 225 | 125 | 1.800 | Pool F |
| 2 | South Korea | 3 | 2 | 1 | 5 | 6 | 3 | 2.000 | 202 | 164 | 1.232 | Pool F |
| 3 | Indonesia | 3 | 1 | 2 | 4 | 3 | 6 | 0.500 | 166 | 198 | 0.838 | Pool H |
| 4 | Uzbekistan | 3 | 0 | 3 | 3 | 0 | 9 | 0.000 | 119 | 225 | 0.529 | Pool H |

| Date | Time | | Score | | Set 1 | Set 2 | Set 3 | Set 4 | Set 5 | Total |
|---|---|---|---|---|---|---|---|---|---|---|
| 05 Sep | 13:00 | South Korea | 3–0 | Indonesia | 25–17 | 25–19 | 25–11 | | | 75–47 |
| 05 Sep | 18:00 | Japan | 3–0 | Uzbekistan | 25–8 | 25–10 | 25–11 | | | 75–29 |
| 06 Sep | 18:00 | Japan | 3–0 | South Korea | 25–18 | 25–15 | 25–19 | | | 75–52 |
| 06 Sep | 20:00 | Uzbekistan | 0–3 | Indonesia | 16–25 | 16–25 | 16–25 | | | 48–75 |
| 07 Sep | 18:00 | Japan | 3–0 | Indonesia | 25–16 | 25–15 | 25–13 | | | 75–44 |
| 07 Sep | 20:00 | South Korea | 3–0 | Uzbekistan | 25–13 | 25–15 | 25–14 | | | 75–42 |

== Classification round ==
- The results and the points of the matches between the same teams that were already played during the preliminary round shall be taken into account for the classification round.

=== Pool E ===
| Pos | Team | Pld | W | L | Pts | SW | SL | SR | SPW | SPL | SPR | Qualification |
|---|---|---|---|---|---|---|---|---|---|---|---|---|
| 1 | Thailand | 3 | 3 | 0 | 6 | 9 | 1 | 9.000 | 243 | 171 | 1.421 | Championship round |
| 2 | Kazakhstan | 3 | 2 | 1 | 5 | 7 | 3 | 2.333 | 231 | 187 | 1.235 | Championship round |
| 3 | Chinese Taipei | 3 | 1 | 2 | 4 | 3 | 6 | 0.500 | 183 | 202 | 0.906 | Championship round |
| 4 | Australia | 3 | 0 | 3 | 3 | 0 | 9 | 0.000 | 128 | 225 | 0.569 | Championship round |

| Date | Time | | Score | | Set 1 | Set 2 | Set 3 | Set 4 | Set 5 | Total |
|---|---|---|---|---|---|---|---|---|---|---|
| 08 Sep | 13:30 | Kazakhstan | 3–0 | Australia | 25–16 | 25–11 | 25–13 | | | 75–40 |
| 08 Sep | 15:30 | Thailand | 3–0 | Chinese Taipei | 25–12 | 25–19 | 25–23 | | | 75–54 |
| 09 Sep | 16:00 | Thailand | 3–1 | Kazakhstan | 18–25 | 25–20 | 25–17 | 25–19 | | 93–81 |
| 09 Sep | 20:00 | Australia | 0–3 | Chinese Taipei | 11–25 | 19–25 | 22–25 | | | 52–75 |

=== Pool F ===
| Pos | Team | Pld | W | L | Pts | SW | SL | SR | SPW | SPL | SPR | Qualification |
|---|---|---|---|---|---|---|---|---|---|---|---|---|
| 1 | Japan | 3 | 3 | 0 | 6 | 9 | 0 | MAX | 229 | 173 | 1.324 | Championship round |
| 2 | China | 3 | 2 | 1 | 5 | 6 | 4 | 1.500 | 238 | 189 | 1.259 | Championship round |
| 3 | South Korea | 3 | 1 | 2 | 4 | 4 | 8 | 0.500 | 225 | 273 | 0.824 | Championship round |
| 4 | Vietnam | 3 | 0 | 3 | 3 | 2 | 9 | 0.222 | 196 | 253 | 0.775 | Championship round |

| Date | Time | | Score | | Set 1 | Set 2 | Set 3 | Set 4 | Set 5 | Total |
|---|---|---|---|---|---|---|---|---|---|---|
| 08 Sep | 18:00 | Japan | 3–0 | Vietnam | 25–20 | 25–16 | 25–16 | | | 75–52 |
| 08 Sep | 20:00 | China | 3–1 | South Korea | 19–25 | 25–15 | 25–16 | 25–14 | | 94–70 |
| 09 Sep | 10:00 | China | 0–3 | Japan | 23–25 | 27–29 | 19–25 | | | 69–79 |
| 09 Sep | 14:00 | Vietnam | 2–3 | South Korea | 17–25 | 25–18 | 25–18 | 25–27 | 12–15 | 104–103 |

=== Pool G ===
| Pos | Team | Pld | W | L | Pts | SW | SL | SR | SPW | SPL | SPR | Qualification |
|---|---|---|---|---|---|---|---|---|---|---|---|---|
| 1 | New Zealand | 1 | 1 | 0 | 2 | 3 | 1 | 3.000 | 97 | 93 | 1.043 | 9th–12th place |
| 2 | Iran | 1 | 0 | 1 | 1 | 1 | 3 | 0.333 | 93 | 97 | 0.959 | 9th–12th place |

=== Pool H ===
| Pos | Team | Pld | W | L | Pts | SW | SL | SR | SPW | SPL | SPR | Qualification |
|---|---|---|---|---|---|---|---|---|---|---|---|---|
| 1 | Indonesia | 2 | 2 | 0 | 4 | 6 | 0 | MAX | 150 | 104 | 1.442 | 9th–12th place |
| 2 | Sri Lanka | 2 | 1 | 1 | 3 | 3 | 5 | 0.600 | 164 | 183 | 0.896 | 9th–12th place |
| 3 | Uzbekistan | 2 | 0 | 2 | 2 | 2 | 6 | 0.333 | 156 | 183 | 0.852 | |

| Date | Time | | Score | | Set 1 | Set 2 | Set 3 | Set 4 | Set 5 | Total |
|---|---|---|---|---|---|---|---|---|---|---|
| 08 Sep | 11:30 | Sri Lanka | 3–2 | Uzbekistan | 25–21 | 21–25 | 21–25 | 26–24 | 15–13 | 108–108 |
| 09 Sep | 11:30 | Sri Lanka | 0–3 | Indonesia | 20–25 | 17–25 | 19–25 | | | 56–75 |

== Final round ==
- The results and the points of the matches between the same teams that were already played during the previous rounds shall be taken into account for the final round.

=== Classification 9th–12th ===
| Pos | Team | Pld | W | L | Pts | SW | SL | SR | SPW | SPL | SPR |
|---|---|---|---|---|---|---|---|---|---|---|---|
| 9 | Indonesia | 3 | 3 | 0 | 6 | 9 | 0 | MAX | 227 | 168 | 1.351 |
| 10 | Sri Lanka | 3 | 2 | 1 | 5 | 6 | 6 | 1.000 | 250 | 256 | 0.977 |
| 11 | New Zealand | 3 | 1 | 2 | 4 | 5 | 7 | 0.714 | 256 | 275 | 0.931 |
| 12 | Iran | 3 | 0 | 3 | 3 | 2 | 9 | 0.222 | 227 | 261 | 0.870 |

| Date | Time | | Score | | Set 1 | Set 2 | Set 3 | Set 4 | Set 5 | Total |
|---|---|---|---|---|---|---|---|---|---|---|
| 11 Sep | 09:00 | New Zealand | 2–3 | Sri Lanka | 25–18 | 25–27 | 25–21 | 16–25 | 13–15 | 104–106 |
| 11 Sep | 13:30 | Indonesia | 3–0 | Iran | 25–14 | 25–19 | 26–24 | | | 76–57 |
| 12 Sep | 09:00 | Iran | 1–3 | Sri Lanka | 25–13 | 18–25 | 21–25 | 13–25 | | 77–88 |
| 12 Sep | 11:30 | New Zealand | 0–3 | Indonesia | 13–25 | 18–25 | 24–26 | | | 55–76 |

=== Championship ===
| Pos | Team | Pld | W | L | Pts | SW | SL | SR | SPW | SPL | SPR |
|---|---|---|---|---|---|---|---|---|---|---|---|
| 1 | Japan | 7 | 7 | 0 | 14 | 21 | 2 | 10.500 | 576 | 419 | 1.375 |
| 2 | China | 7 | 6 | 1 | 13 | 18 | 4 | 4.500 | 541 | 387 | 1.398 |
| 3 | Thailand | 7 | 5 | 2 | 12 | 16 | 10 | 1.600 | 596 | 539 | 1.106 |
| 4 | South Korea | 7 | 4 | 3 | 11 | 15 | 13 | 1.154 | 591 | 589 | 1.003 |
| 5 | Kazakhstan | 7 | 3 | 4 | 10 | 13 | 12 | 1.083 | 554 | 524 | 1.057 |
| 6 | Chinese Taipei | 7 | 2 | 5 | 9 | 6 | 15 | 0.400 | 405 | 485 | 0.835 |
| 7 | Vietnam | 7 | 1 | 6 | 8 | 6 | 19 | 0.316 | 494 | 569 | 0.868 |
| 8 | Australia | 7 | 0 | 7 | 7 | 1 | 21 | 0.048 | 303 | 548 | 0.553 |

| Date | Time | | Score | | Set 1 | Set 2 | Set 3 | Set 4 | Set 5 | Total |
|---|---|---|---|---|---|---|---|---|---|---|
| 10 Sep | 12:00 | Japan | 3–0 | Australia | 25–10 | 25–13 | 25–12 | | | 75–35 |
| 10 Sep | 13:30 | Kazakhstan | 2–3 | South Korea | 24–26 | 31–29 | 23–25 | 25–19 | 11–15 | 114–114 |
| 10 Sep | 16:00 | Thailand | 3–1 | Vietnam | 26–24 | 25–21 | 22–25 | 25–20 | | 98–90 |
| 10 Sep | 18:00 | China | 3–0 | Chinese Taipei | 25–11 | 25–17 | 25–13 | | | 75–41 |
| 11 Sep | 12:00 | Japan | 3–0 | Chinese Taipei | 25–12 | 25–16 | 25–20 | | | 75–48 |
| 11 Sep | 16:00 | Thailand | 3–2 | South Korea | 22–25 | 20–25 | 25–20 | 25–17 | 15–13 | 107–100 |
| 11 Sep | 18:00 | China | 3–0 | Australia | 25–5 | 25–15 | 25–15 | | | 75–35 |
| 11 Sep | 20:00 | Kazakhstan | 3–0 | Vietnam | 25–17 | 25–17 | 25–17 | | | 75–51 |
| 12 Sep | 14:00 | Australia | 1–3 | Vietnam | 11–25 | 25–23 | 21–25 | 11–25 | | 68–98 |
| 12 Sep | 16:00 | Kazakhstan | 0–3 | China | 21–25 | 22–25 | 16–25 | | | 59–75 |
| 12 Sep | 17:30 | Thailand | 1–3 | Japan | 25–27 | 18–25 | 25–23 | 17–25 | | 85–100 |
| 12 Sep | 20:00 | Chinese Taipei | 0–3 | South Korea | 17–25 | 16–25 | 25–27 | | | 58–77 |
| 13 Sep | 11:30 | South Korea | 3–0 | Australia | 25–17 | 25–13 | 25–7 | | | 75–37 |
| 13 Sep | 14:00 | Japan | 3–1 | Kazakhstan | 22–25 | 25–16 | 25–18 | 25–16 | | 97–75 |
| 13 Sep | 16:00 | Thailand | 0–3 | China | 18–25 | 26–28 | 19–25 | | | 63–78 |
| 13 Sep | 18:00 | Chinese Taipei | 3–0 | Vietnam | 25–15 | 25–20 | 25–21 | | | 75–56 |

== Final standing ==
| Rank | Team |
|---|---|
| 1st place, gold medalist(s) | Japan |
| 2nd place, silver medalist(s) | China |
| 3rd place, bronze medalist(s) | Thailand |
| 4 | South Korea |
| 5 | Kazakhstan |
| 6 | Chinese Taipei |
| 7 | Vietnam |
| 8 | Australia |
| 9 | Indonesia |
| 10 | Sri Lanka |
| 11 | New Zealand |
| 12 | Iran |
| 13 | Uzbekistan |

| Qualified for the 2007 World Cup and 2008 Olympic Qualifier |
| Qualified for the 2008 Olympic Qualifier |

2007 Asian Women's champions

Japan
3rd title

Team Roster

Megumi Kurihara, Yoshie Takeshita, Megumi Itabashi, Miyuki Takahashi, Asako Tajimi, Sachiko Sugiyama, Kumiko Sakino, Erika Araki, Saori Kimura, Kanako Omura, Yuko Sano, Yuki Shoji

Head Coach: Shoichi Yanagimoto

== Awards ==
- MVP: (Japan) Miyuki Takahashi
- Best scorer: (Kazakhstan) Yelena Pavlova
- Best spiker: (China) Xue Ming
- Best blocker: (Thailand) Pleumjit Thinkaow
- Best server: (Japan) Saori Kimura
- Best setter: (Thailand) Nootsara Tomkom
- Best digger: (Thailand) Wanna Buakaew
- Best receiver: (Japan) Yuko Sano
