= Uzbekistan women's national volleyball team =

National sports team

Uzbekistan
- Association: Volleyball Association of Uzbekistan
- Confederation: AVC
- FIVB ranking: 108 ▼16 (2 October 2026)

Uniforms
Home	Away

The Uzbekistan women's national volleyball team represents Uzbekistan in international women's volleyball competitions and friendly matches.

It appeared at the Asian Women's Volleyball Championship 6 times.

== Competition records ==
=== Asian Nations Cup ===
- (Thailand) 2022 – 4th place
- (Indonesia) 2023 – 8th place
- (Philippines) 2024 – did not participate
- (Vietnam) 2025 – did not participate
- (Philippines) 2026 – 10th place

=== CAVA Challenge Cup ===
- (Nepal) 2023 – 4th place

=== AVC Central Asia Zone Championship ===
- (Bangladesh) 2021 – Silver medal
