= 2005 Asian Women's Volleyball Championship =

International indoor volleyball tournament

Tournament details
- Host country: China
- City: Taicang
- Dates: 1–8 September
- Teams: 12 (from 1 confederation)
- Venue: 1 (in 1 host city)

Final positions
- Champions: China (11th title)
- Runners-up: Kazakhstan
- Third place: Japan
- Fourth place: South Korea

Tournament awards
- MVP: (China) Chu Jinling

The 2005 Asian Women's Volleyball Championship was the thirteenth edition of the Asian Championship, a biennial international volleyball tournament organised by the Asian Volleyball Confederation (AVC) with Chinese Volleyball Association (CVA). The tournament was held in Taicang, China from 1 to 8 September 2005.

== Pools composition ==
The teams are seeded based on their final ranking at the 2003 Asian Women's Volleyball Championship.

Pool A	Pool B
China (Host & 1st); Thailand (4th); Hong Kong; North Korea; Philippines; Kazakhstan	Japan (2nd); South Korea (3rd); Chinese Taipei; Vietnam; India; Australia

== Preliminary round ==
=== Pool A ===
Pos	Team	Pld	W	L	Pts	SW	SL	SR	SPW	SPL	SPR	Qualification
1	China	5	5	0	10	15	0	MAX	377	216	1.745	Quarterfinals
2	Kazakhstan	5	4	1	9	12	6	2.000	408	339	1.204	Quarterfinals
3	Thailand	5	3	2	8	9	7	1.286	358	316	1.133	Quarterfinals
4	North Korea	5	2	3	7	9	9	1.000	395	360	1.097	Quarterfinals
5	Philippines	5	1	4	6	4	12	0.333	262	378	0.693	
6	Hong Kong	5	0	5	5	0	15	0.000	184	375	0.491	

Date	Time		Score		Set 1	Set 2	Set 3	Set 4	Set 5	Total
01 Sep	10:00	Thailand	0–3	Kazakhstan	17–25	16–25	27–29			60–79
01 Sep	11:30	China	3–0	North Korea	27–25	25–16	25–14			77–55
01 Sep	16:00	Hong Kong	0–3	Philippines	21–25	13–25	22–25			56–75
02 Sep	09:00	North Korea	3–0	Philippines	25–17	25–12	25–13			75–42
02 Sep	19:30	China	3–0	Thailand	25–16	25–10	25–17			75–43
02 Sep	21:00	Kazakhstan	3–0	Hong Kong	25–11	25–12	25–17			75–40
03 Sep	14:30	Thailand	3–1	North Korea	25–15	25–15	23–25	32–30		105–85
03 Sep	16:00	Philippines	1–3	Kazakhstan	11–25	11–25	25–22	12–25		59–97
03 Sep	19:00	Hong Kong	0–3	China	12–25	9–25	8–25			29–75
04 Sep	09:00	North Korea	2–3	Kazakhstan	22–25	20–25	25–20	25–22	13–15	105–107
04 Sep	16:00	China	3–0	Philippines	25–10	25–16	25–13			75–39
04 Sep	20:30	Thailand	3–0	Hong Kong	25–6	25–9	25–15			75–30
05 Sep	10:30	Philippines	0–3	Thailand	14–25	16–25	17–25			47–75
05 Sep	14:30	Hong Kong	0–3	North Korea	5–25	10–25	14–25			29–75
05 Sep	19:30	Kazakhstan	0–3	China	20–25	12–25	18–25			50–75

=== Pool B ===
Pos	Team	Pld	W	L	Pts	SW	SL	SR	SPW	SPL	SPR	Qualification
1	Japan	5	5	0	10	15	1	15.000	392	280	1.400	Quarterfinals
2	South Korea	5	4	1	9	13	3	4.333	383	328	1.168	Quarterfinals
3	Chinese Taipei	5	3	2	8	9	7	1.286	378	312	1.212	Quarterfinals
4	Vietnam	5	2	3	7	7	9	0.778	348	359	0.969	Quarterfinals
5	Australia	5	1	4	6	3	13	0.231	294	393	0.748	
6	India	5	0	5	5	1	15	0.067	278	401	0.693	

Date	Time		Score		Set 1	Set 2	Set 3	Set 4	Set 5	Total
01 Sep	14:30	Japan	3–0	Vietnam	25–17	25–17	25–21			75–55
01 Sep	19:00	Chinese Taipei	3–0	Australia	25–9	25–9	25–20			75–38
01 Sep	20:30	India	0–3	South Korea	16–25	21–25	16–25			53–75
02 Sep	10:30	Vietnam	3–0	India	25–20	25–21	25–16			75–57
02 Sep	14:30	Australia	0–3	South Korea	21–25	18–25	18–25			57–75
02 Sep	16:00	Chinese Taipei	0–3	Japan	22–25	23–25	17–25			62–75
03 Sep	09:00	India	0–3	Chinese Taipei	12–25	13–25	14–25			39–75
03 Sep	10:30	Japan	3–0	Australia	25–13	25–16	25–15			75–44
03 Sep	20:30	South Korea	3–0	Vietnam	25–21	25–19	25–18			75–58
04 Sep	10:30	Chinese Taipei	0–3	South Korea	22–25	23–25	23–25			68–75
04 Sep	14:30	Australia	0–3	Vietnam	22–25	15–25	17–25			54–75
04 Sep	19:00	Japan	3–0	India	25–5	25–19	25–12			75–36
05 Sep	09:00	Vietnam	1–3	Chinese Taipei	21–25	25–22	15–25	24–26		85–98
05 Sep	16:00	India	1–3	Australia	19–25	25–23	25–27	24–26		93–101
05 Sep	21:00	South Korea	1–3	Japan	25–17	17–25	19–25	22–25		83–92

== Classification 9th–12th ==
9th–12th places
6 September – Taicang
Philippines	3
India	1
6 September – Taicang
Australia	3
Hong Kong	1

9th place
7 September – Taicang
Philippines	3
Australia	0
11th place
7 September – Taicang
India	3
Hong Kong	1

=== Semifinals ===
Date	Time		Score		Set 1	Set 2	Set 3	Set 4	Set 5	Total
06 Sep	09:00	Philippines	3–1	India	25–21	18–25	25–17	25–18		93–81
06 Sep	10:30	Australia	3–1	Hong Kong	25–17	24–26	25–17	25–15		99–75

=== 11th place ===
Date	Time		Score		Set 1	Set 2	Set 3	Set 4	Set 5	Total
07 Sep	09:00	India	3–1	Hong Kong	23–25	25–16	25–23	25–10		98–74

=== 9th place ===
Date	Time		Score		Set 1	Set 2	Set 3	Set 4	Set 5	Total
07 Sep	10:30	Philippines	3–0	Australia	25–23	25–18	25–18			75–59

== Final round ==
Quarterfinals
6 September – Taicang
China	3
Vietnam	0
6 September – Taicang
South Korea	3
Thailand	2
6 September – Taicang
Japan	3
North Korea	0
6 September – Taicang
Kazakhstan	3
Chinese Taipei	1

Semifinals
7 September – Taicang
China	3
South Korea	0
7 September – Taicang
Japan	2
Kazakhstan	3

Final
8 September – Taicang
China	3
Kazakhstan	0
3rd place
8 September – Taicang
South Korea	0
Japan	3

5th–8th places
7 September – Taicang
Vietnam	0
Thailand	3
7 September – Taicang
North Korea	1
Chinese Taipei	3

5th place
8 September – Taicang
Thailand	0
Chinese Taipei	3
7th place
8 September – Taicang
Vietnam	0
North Korea	3

=== Quarterfinals ===
Date	Time		Score		Set 1	Set 2	Set 3	Set 4	Set 5	Total
06 Sep	14:30	China	3–0	Vietnam	25–20	25–11	25–18			75–49
06 Sep	16:00	Japan	3–0	North Korea	25–20	25–13	25–14			75–47
06 Sep	19:00	Kazakhstan	3–1	Chinese Taipei	26–24	25–23	23–25	26–24		100–96
06 Sep	20:30	South Korea	3–2	Thailand	22–25	24–26	25–22	25–22	16–14	112–109

=== 5th–8th semifinals ===
Date	Time		Score		Set 1	Set 2	Set 3	Set 4	Set 5	Total
07 Sep	14:30	Vietnam	0–3	Thailand	16–25	19–25	18–25			53–75
07 Sep	16:00	North Korea	1–3	Chinese Taipei	15–25	15–25	25–22	15–25		70–97

=== Semifinals ===
Date	Time		Score		Set 1	Set 2	Set 3	Set 4	Set 5	Total
07 Sep	19:30	China	3–0	South Korea	25–18	25–19	25–13			75–50
07 Sep	21:00	Japan	2–3	Kazakhstan	25–21	25–27	25–22	23–25	12–15	110–110

=== 7th place ===
Date	Time		Score		Set 1	Set 2	Set 3	Set 4	Set 5	Total
08 Sep	13:00	Vietnam	0–3	North Korea	17–25	20–25	16–25			53–75

=== 5th place ===
Date	Time		Score		Set 1	Set 2	Set 3	Set 4	Set 5	Total
08 Sep	14:30	Thailand	0–3	Chinese Taipei	22–25	23–25	12–25			57–75

=== 3rd place ===
Date	Time		Score		Set 1	Set 2	Set 3	Set 4	Set 5	Total
08 Sep	17:00	South Korea	0–3	Japan	16–25	19–25	18–25			53–75

=== Final ===
Date	Time		Score		Set 1	Set 2	Set 3	Set 4	Set 5	Total
08 Sep	19:30	China	3–0	Kazakhstan	25–18	25–16	25–17			75–51

== Final standing ==
Rank	Team
1st place, gold medalist(s)	China
2nd place, silver medalist(s)	Kazakhstan
3rd place, bronze medalist(s)	Japan
4	South Korea
5	Chinese Taipei
6	Thailand
7	North Korea
8	Vietnam
9	Philippines
10	Australia
11	India
12	Hong Kong

Qualified for the 2005 World Grand Champions Cup

2005 Asian Women's champions

China
11th title

== Awards ==
- MVP: (China) Chu Jinling
- Best scorer: (Kazakhstan) Yelena Pavlova
- Best spiker: (China) Chu Jinling
- Best blocker: (Chinese Taipei) Lin Chun-yi
- Best server: (Thailand) Amporn Hyapha
- Best setter: (China) Feng Kun
- Best digger: (Chinese Taipei) Chen Chia-chi
- Best receiver: (China) Zhou Suhong
