= 2005 FIVB Volleyball Women's World Grand Champions Cup =

Volleyball competition held in Japan

2005 World Grand Champions Cup
Tournament details
- Host country: Japan
- Dates: November 15–20, 2005
- Teams: 6
- Venues: 2 (in 2 host cities)

Final positions
- Champions: Brazil (1st title)
- Runners-up: United States
- Third place: China

Tournament awards
- MVP: Sheilla Castro

The 2005 FIVB Women's World Grand Champions Cup was held in Tokyo and Nagoya, Japan from November 15–20, 2005.

== Teams ==
Team	Qualified as
Japan	Host Nation
China	2005 Asian Champions
United States	2005 NORCECA Champions
Brazil	2005 South American Champions
Poland	2005 European Champions
South Korea	Wild Card

== Competition formula ==
The competition formula of the 2005 Women's World Grand Champions Cup is the single Round-Robin system. Each team plays once against each of the 5 remaining teams. Points are accumulated during the whole tournament, and the final standing is determined by the total points gained.

== Venues ==
- Nagoya Rainbow Hall (Nagoya)
- Tokyo Metropolitan Gymnasium (Tokyo)

== Results ==
Pos	Team	Pld	W	L	Pts	SW	SL	SR	SPW	SPL	SPR
1	Brazil	5	5	0	10	15	2	7.500	398	323	1.232
2	United States	5	4	1	9	12	4	3.000	379	355	1.068
3	China	5	3	2	8	11	8	1.375	430	382	1.126
4	Poland	5	1	4	6	7	14	0.500	431	467	0.923
5	Japan	5	1	4	6	6	12	0.500	372	418	0.890
6	South Korea	5	1	4	6	3	14	0.214	340	405	0.840

=== Tokyo round ===
Date	Time		Score		Set 1	Set 2	Set 3	Set 4	Set 5	Total	Report
15 Nov	12:00	Brazil	3–2	China	15–25	17–25	25–20	25–20	15–8	97–98	P2
15 Nov	15:00	United States	3–0	South Korea	25–20	25–22	25–20			75–62	P2
15 Nov	18:30	Poland	3–2	Japan	25–19	18–25	16–25	26–24	15–12	100–105	P2
16 Nov	12:00	China	0–3	United States	22–25	23–25	24–26			69–76	P2
16 Nov	15:00	Poland	0–3	Brazil	24–26	18–25	21–25			63–76	P2
16 Nov	18:00	Japan	3–0	South Korea	25–23	27–25	25–21			77–69	P2

=== Nagoya round ===
Date	Time		Score		Set 1	Set 2	Set 3	Set 4	Set 5	Total	Report
18 Nov	12:00	South Korea	0–3	China	18–25	17–25	19–25			54–75	P2
18 Nov	15:00	United States	3–1	Poland	25–20	21–25	25–20	25–19		96–84	P2
18 Nov	18:00	Brazil	3–0	Japan	25–17	25–19	25–15			75–51	P2
19 Nov	12:00	Brazil	3–0	United States	25–16	25–19	25–19			75–54	P2
19 Nov	15:00	Poland	2–3	South Korea	24–26	25–17	18–25	25–15	11–15	103–98	P2
19 Nov	18:00	Japan	1–3	China	15–25	25–21	15–25	19–25		74–96	P2
20 Nov	12:00	South Korea	0–3	Brazil	19–25	18–25	20–25			57–75	P2
20 Nov	15:00	China	3–1	Poland	17–25	25–17	25–19	25–20		92–81	P2
20 Nov	18:00	United States	3–0	Japan	28–26	25–23	25–16			78–65	P2

== Final standing ==
Rank	Team
1st place, gold medalist(s)	Brazil
2nd place, silver medalist(s)	United States
3rd place, bronze medalist(s)	China
4	Poland
5	Japan
6	South Korea

2005 FIVB Women's World Grand Champions Cup champions

Brazil
First title

Team Roster
Fabiana, Carol, Natália, Carol Gattaz, Fernanda, Valeskinha, Sassá, Marcelle, Jaqueline, Sheilla, Fabi, Renatinha

Head Coach: Zé Roberto

== Awards ==
- MVP: (Brazil) Sheilla Castro
- Best scorer: (Brazil) Sheilla Castro
- Best spiker: (China) Zhou Suhong
- Best blocker: (Brazil) Fabiana Claudino
- Best receiver: (China) Zhou Suhong
- Best server: (Brazil) Welissa Gonzaga
- Best setter: (China) Feng Kun
- Best digger: (Japan) Yuka Sakurai
