= New Zealand women's national volleyball team =

Women's national volleyball team representing New Zealand

New Zealand
- Nickname(s): Volley Ferns
- Association: Volleyball New Zealand
- Confederation: AVC
- Head coach: Adam Watson
- FIVB ranking: 61 ▲9 (29 June 2025)

Uniforms
Home	Away
- www.volleyballnz.org.nz

The New Zealand women's national volleyball team represents New Zealand in international women's volleyball competitions and friendly matches.

It appeared at the Asian Women's Volleyball Championship 10 times.
