= 2001 Asian Women's Volleyball Championship =

International indoor volleyball tournament

Tournament details
- Host country: Thailand
- City: Nakhon Ratchasima
- Dates: 23–30 September
- Teams: 9 (from 1 confederation)
- Venue: 1 (in 1 host city)

Final positions
- Champions: China (9th title)
- Runners-up: South Korea
- Third place: Thailand
- Fourth place: Japan

The 2001 Asian Women's Volleyball Championship was the eleventh edition of the Asian Championship, a biennial international volleyball tournament organised by the Asian Volleyball Confederation (AVC) with Thailand Volleyball Association (TVA). The tournament was held in Nakhon Ratchasima, Thailand from 23 to 30 September 2001.

== Pools composition ==
The teams are seeded based on their final ranking at the 1999 Asian Women's Volleyball Championship.

Pool A	Pool B
Thailand (Host); Japan (3rd); Chinese Taipei; New Zealand; Sri Lanka	China (1st); South Korea (2nd); Vietnam; Australia; ~~Kazakhstan~~ *

* Withdrew

== Preliminary round ==
=== Pool A ===
Pos	Team	Pld	W	L	Pts	SW	SL	SR	SPW	SPL	SPR	Qualification
1	Japan	4	4	0	8	12	1	12.000	329	226	1.456	Semifinals
2	Thailand	4	3	1	7	10	4	2.500	332	263	1.262	Semifinals
3	Chinese Taipei	4	2	2	6	7	6	1.167	300	240	1.250	5th–8th place
4	New Zealand	4	1	3	5	3	10	0.300	198	317	0.625	5th–8th place
5	Sri Lanka	4	0	4	4	1	12	0.083	207	320	0.647	

Date		Score		Set 1	Set 2	Set 3	Set 4	Set 5	Total
23 Sep	New Zealand	0–3	Thailand	7–25	9–25	16–25			32–75
23 Sep	Chinese Taipei	0–3	Japan	23–25	16–25	20–25			59–75
24 Sep	Sri Lanka	0–3	Japan	18–25	15–25	7–25			40–75
24 Sep	New Zealand	0–3	Chinese Taipei	14–25	7–25	12–25			33–75
25 Sep	Sri Lanka	1–3	New Zealand	25–18	20–25	25–27	22–25		92–95
25 Sep	Thailand	3–1	Chinese Taipei	25–23	18–25	25–23	25–20		93–91
26 Sep	Japan	3–0	New Zealand	25–10	25–15	25–13			75–38
26 Sep	Thailand	3–0	Sri Lanka	25–13	25–10	25–13			75–36
27 Sep	Chinese Taipei	3–0	Sri Lanka	25–13	25–11	25–15			75–39
27 Sep	Japan	3–1	Thailand	25–22	29–31	25–19	25–17		104–89

=== Pool B ===
Pos	Team	Pld	W	L	Pts	SW	SL	SR	SPW	SPL	SPR	Qualification
1	China	3	3	0	6	9	1	9.000	250	154	1.623	Semifinals
2	South Korea	3	2	1	5	7	4	1.750	248	226	1.097	Semifinals
3	Australia	3	1	2	4	4	7	0.571	218	249	0.876	5th–8th place
4	Vietnam	3	0	3	3	1	9	0.111	160	247	0.648	5th–8th place

Date		Score		Set 1	Set 2	Set 3	Set 4	Set 5	Total
23 Sep	Vietnam	0–3	South Korea	14–25	15–25	20–25			49–75
24 Sep	Vietnam	0–3	China	9–25	13–25	12–25			34–75
25 Sep	Australia	3–1	Vietnam	25–18	25–18	22–25	25–16		97–77
25 Sep	South Korea	1–3	China	19–25	27–25	9–25	21–25		76–100
26 Sep	South Korea	3–1	Australia	25–16	25–16	22–25	25–20		97–77
27 Sep	China	3–0	Australia	25–17	25–16	25–11			75–44

== Classification 5th–8th ==
5th–8th places
29 September – Nakhon Ratchasima
Chinese Taipei	3
Vietnam	0
29 September – Nakhon Ratchasima
New Zealand	0
Australia	3

5th place
30 September – Nakhon Ratchasima
Chinese Taipei	3
Australia	0
7th place
30 September – Nakhon Ratchasima
Vietnam	3
New Zealand	0

=== Semifinals ===
Date		Score		Set 1	Set 2	Set 3	Set 4	Set 5	Total
29 Sep	Chinese Taipei	3–0	Vietnam						
29 Sep	New Zealand	0–3	Australia	15–25	15–25	17–25			47–75

=== 7th place ===
Date		Score		Set 1	Set 2	Set 3	Set 4	Set 5	Total
30 Sep	Vietnam	3–0	New Zealand	25–15	25–22	25–15			75–52

=== 5th place ===
Date		Score		Set 1	Set 2	Set 3	Set 4	Set 5	Total
30 Sep	Chinese Taipei	3–0	Australia	25–13	25–21	25–19			75–53

== Final round ==
Semifinals
29 September – Nakhon Ratchasima
Japan	2
South Korea	3
29 September – Nakhon Ratchasima
Thailand	0
China	3

Final
30 September – Nakhon Ratchasima
South Korea	0
China	3
3rd place
30 September – Nakhon Ratchasima
Japan	2
Thailand	3

=== Semifinals ===
Date		Score		Set 1	Set 2	Set 3	Set 4	Set 5	Total
29 Sep	Japan	2–3	South Korea	18–25	27–25	25–22	20–25	11–15	101–112
29 Sep	Thailand	0–3	China	15–25	19–25	20–25			54–75

=== 3rd place ===
Date		Score		Set 1	Set 2	Set 3	Set 4	Set 5	Total
30 Sep	Japan	2–3	Thailand	20–25	21–25	25–16	25–19	17–19	108–104

=== Final ===
Date		Score		Set 1	Set 2	Set 3	Set 4	Set 5	Total
30 Sep	South Korea	0–3	China	11–25	21–25	19–25			51–75

== Final standing ==
Rank	Team
1st place, gold medalist(s)	China
2nd place, silver medalist(s)	South Korea
3rd place, bronze medalist(s)	Thailand
4	Japan
5	Chinese Taipei
6	Australia
7	Vietnam
8	New Zealand
9	Sri Lanka

Qualified for the 2001 World Grand Champions Cup

2001 Asian Women's champions

China
9th title
