= AVC Women's Volleyball Continental Championship =

International indoor volleyball tournament

- Most recent season or competition: 2026 AVC Women's Volleyball Continental Championship
- Formerly: Asian Women's Volleyball Championship (1975–2023)
- Sport: Volleyball
- Founded: 1975; 51 years ago
- First season: 1975
- No. of teams: 12
- Continents: Asia and Oceania (AVC)
- Most recent champions: Thailand (4th title)
- Most titles: China (13 titles)
- Broadcaster: VBTV
- Website: asianvolleyball.net

The AVC Women's Volleyball Continental Championship (formerly known as the Asian Women's Volleyball Championship) is an international volleyball competition in Asia and Oceania. It is organized by the Asian Volleyball Confederation (AVC), the sport's continental governing body, and is contested by the senior women's national teams of its member nations.

This tournament serves as a qualification tournament to determine Asian representatives for major global events organized by the Fédération Internationale de Volleyball (FIVB), such as the FIVB Women's Volleyball World Cup and the Olympic Games.

Initially established in 1975 in Australia, the competition was held every four years before shifting to a biennial format starting in 1987. However, the 2021 edition was cancelled due to the COVID-19 pandemic. Most recently, the competition cycle was adjusted again, moving to even-numbered years starting in 2026 to align with the new FIVB global volleyball calendar for 2025–2028.

From its inception until the 2026 edition, the tournament has been held 22 times, with a total of 25 national teams having competed. Throughout its history, only three nations have successfully claimed the championship title: China with 13 titles, Japan with 5 titles, and Thailand with 4 titles.

The reigning champions are Thailand, who successfully secured their fourth title at the 2026 edition held in China.

== History ==
The inaugural tournament, originally established as the Asian Women's Volleyball Championship, was hosted in Melbourne, Australia, in 1975. Initially, the Asian Volleyball Confederation (AVC) organized the competition on a quadrennial basis. In 1987, the tournament transitioned to a biennial cycle held in odd-numbered years to better align with the international volleyball calendar.

Throughout its history, the championship has functioned as the primary continental qualification pathway for major global tournaments governed by the Fédération Internationale de Volleyball (FIVB). From its early editions through the early 1990s, the tournament served as a direct Olympic qualification event for Asian teams. In subsequent decades, it acted as a continental qualifier for the now-defunct FIVB Women's Volleyball World Cup, which in turn served as a global qualification step for the Olympic Games. Furthermore, between 1993 and 2013, the tournament winners were awarded a continental berth to compete in the quadrennial FIVB World Grand Champions Cup.

The tournament was held consecutively until 2021. The 21st edition, originally scheduled to take place in the Philippines, was intended to allocate Asian qualification spots for the 2022 FIVB Women's Volleyball World Championship. However, the AVC cancelled the event due to international travel restrictions and health concerns related to the COVID-19 pandemic. The World Championship berths were instead distributed based on the FIVB Senior World Rankings. The tournament officially resumed in 2023 with Thailand acting as the host nation.

Following a commercial partnership between the AVC and Volleyball World, first signed in 2022 and later extended through 2052, the tournament was officially rebranded as the AVC Women's Volleyball Continental Championship in 2026. This edition also marked the first to be officially sanctioned by Volleyball World, coinciding with the shift to even-numbered years under the FIVB's 2025–2032 global calendar. The stakes of the competition were significantly upgraded, with the tournament now serving as a direct qualifier, awarding the champions an automatic berth to the 2028 Summer Olympics and the top three teams spots in the 2027 FIVB Women's Volleyball World Cup.

== Competition formula ==
=== Qualification ===
Beginning with the 2026 edition, a total of twelve teams compete in the tournament. The qualification process is structured to ensure continental representation, with berths distributed through four criteria:

- Two automatic berths are granted to the host nation and the defending champions.
- One berth is awarded to the winners of the AVC Women's Volleyball Cup.
- Five berths are allocated to the five AVC-affiliated zonal associations with each zone receiving one berth decided via zonal qualification tournaments.
- Four berths are assigned based on the FIVB Senior World Rankings.

=== Final tournament ===
Beginning with the 2026 edition, the tournament is split into two main phases:

- Preliminary phase: The twelve teams are divided into three pools of four (Pools A, B, and C) and play a single round-robin. Pool standings are determined by match wins, followed by match points, set ratio, points ratio, and head-to-head results.
- Final phase: The top two teams from each pool and the two best third-placed teams advance to the quarterfinals. The quarterfinal matchups are determined by a combined ranking of the eight advancing teams. From this point, the tournament uses a single-elimination knockout bracket consisting of quarterfinals, semifinals, and the gold medal match, alongside a bronze medal match for the semifinal losers.

== Results summary ==
=== Finals ===
#	Year	Host	Final			3rd place match			Teams
#	Year	Host	Champions	Score	Runners-up	3rd place	Score	4th place	Teams
1	1975; Details	(Australia); Melbourne	Japan	Round-robin	South Korea	China	Round-robin	Australia	5
2	1979; Details	Hong Kong	China	Round-robin	Japan	South Korea	Round-robin	Australia	7
3	1983; Details	(Japan); Fukuoka	Japan	Round-robin	China	South Korea	Round-robin	Chinese Taipei	9
4	1987; Details	(China); Shanghai	China	3–0	Japan	South Korea	3–0	New Zealand	11
5	1989; Details	Hong Kong	China	3–0	South Korea	Japan	3–1	Chinese Taipei	10
6	1991; Details	(Thailand); Bangkok	China	3–0	Japan	South Korea	3–0	North Korea	14
7	1993; Details	(China); Shanghai	China	3–0	Japan	South Korea	3–1	Chinese Taipei	14
8	1995; Details	(Thailand); Chiang Mai	China	Round-robin	South Korea	Japan	Round-robin	Chinese Taipei	9
9	1997; Details	(Philippines); Manila	China	Round-robin	South Korea	Japan	Round-robin	Chinese Taipei	9
10	1999; Details	Hong Kong	China	Round-robin	South Korea	Japan	Round-robin	Thailand	9
11	2001; Details	(Thailand); Nakhon Ratchasima	China	3–0	South Korea	Thailand	3–2	Japan	9
12	2003; Details	(Vietnam); Ho Chi Minh City	China	3–0	Japan	South Korea	3–1	Thailand	10
13	2005; Details	(China); Taicang	China	3–0	Kazakhstan	Japan	3–0	South Korea	12
14	2007; Details	(Thailand); Nakhon Ratchasima	Japan	Round-robin	China	Thailand	Round-robin	South Korea	13
15	2009; Details	(Vietnam); Hanoi	Thailand	3–1	China	Japan	3–0	South Korea	14
16	2011; Details	(Taiwan); Taipei	China	3–1	Japan	South Korea	3–2	Thailand	14
17	2013; Details	(Thailand); Nakhon Ratchasima	Thailand	3–0	Japan	South Korea	3–2	China	16
18	2015; Details	(China); Tianjin	China	3–0	South Korea	Thailand	3–0	Chinese Taipei	14
19	2017; Details	(Philippines); Biñan / Muntinlupa	Japan	3–2	Thailand	South Korea	3–0	China	14
20	2019; Details	(South Korea); Seoul	Japan	3–1	Thailand	South Korea	3–0	China	13
21	2023; Details	(Thailand); Nakhon Ratchasima	Thailand	3–2	China	Japan	3–2	Vietnam	14
22	2026; Details	(China); Tianjin	Thailand	3–2	China	Japan	3–0	Iran	12

=== Performances by team ===
Team	Champions	Runners-up	3rd place	4th place	Total
China	13	5	1	3	22
Japan	5	7	8	1	21
Thailand	4	2	3	3	12
South Korea	0	7	10	3	20
Kazakhstan	0	1	0	0	1
Chinese Taipei	0	0	0	6	6
Australia	0	0	0	2	2
Iran	0	0	0	1	1
New Zealand	0	0	0	1	1
North Korea	0	0	0	1	1
Vietnam	0	0	0	1	1

=== Performances by zonal association ===
Zonal association	Champions	Runners-up	3rd place	4th place	Total
EAVA (East Asia)	18	19	19	14	70
SAVA (Southeast Asia)	4	2	3	4	13
CAVA (Central Asia)	0	1	0	1	2
OZVA (Oceania)	0	0	0	3	3

== Medal summary ==
Rank	Team	Gold	Silver	Bronze	Total
1	China	13	5	1	19
2	Japan	5	7	8	20
3	Thailand	4	2	3	9
4	South Korea	0	7	10	17
5	Kazakhstan	0	1	0	1
Totals (5 entries)		22	22	22	66

== National team appearances ==
=== Comprehensive team results ===
Year Team	(Australia) 1975 (5)	(Hong Kong) 1979 (7)	(Japan) 1983 (9)	(China) 1987 (11)	(Hong Kong) 1989 (10)	(Thailand) 1991 (14)	(China) 1993 (14)	(Thailand) 1995 (9)	(Philippines) 1997 (9)	(Hong Kong) 1999 (9)	(Thailand) 2001 (9)	(Vietnam) 2003 (10)	(China) 2005 (12)	(Thailand) 2007 (13)	(Vietnam) 2009 (14)	(Taiwan) 2011 (14)	(Thailand) 2013 (16)	(China) 2015 (14)	(Philippines) 2017 (14)	(South Korea) 2019 (13)	(Thailand) 2023 (14)	(China) 2026 (12)	Total
Australia	4th	4th	7th	7th	7th	6th	10th	6th	7th	6th	6th	9th	10th	8th	9th	10th	9th	9th	10th	9th	8th	11th	22
China	3rd	1st	2nd	1st	1st	1st	1st	1st	1st	1st	1st	1st	1st	2nd	2nd	1st	4th	1st	4th	4th	2nd	2nd	22
Chinese Taipei	•	•	4th	•	4th	5th	4th	4th	4th	5th	5th	5th	5th	6th	6th	5th	7th	4th	6th	6th	9th	8th	19
Hong Kong	•	6th	8th	10th	8th	11th	12th	9th	9th	8th	•	•	12th	•	10th	•	13th	13th	11th	11th	11th	10th	17
India	•	7th	•	•	•	14th	•	•	•	•	•	•	11th	•	11th	11th	11th	•	10th	10th	7th	•	9
Indonesia	•	5th	6th	6th	9th	9th	8th	•	•	•	•	•	•	9th	13th	13th	10th	•	•	8th	•	5th	12
Iran	•	•	•	•	•	•	•	•	•	•	•	•	•	12th	8th	8th	8th	8th	9th	7th	10th	4th	9
Iraq	•	•	•	•	•	•	•	•	•	•	•	•	•	•	•	•	•	•	•	•	•	12th	1
Japan	1st	2nd	1st	2nd	3rd	2nd	2nd	3rd	3rd	3rd	4th	2nd	3rd	1st	3rd	2nd	2nd	6th	1st	1st	3rd	3rd	22
Kazakhstan	•	•	•	•	•	•	5th	•	•	9th	•	7th	2nd	5th	5th	9th	5th	7th	7th	5th	5th	9th	13
Macau	•	•	•	11th	10th	•	•	•	•	•	•	•	•	•	•	•	•	•	•	•	•	•	2
Malaysia	•	•	•	9th	•	•	•	•	•	•	•	•	•	•	•	•	•	•	•	•	•	•	1
Maldives	•	•	•	•	•	•	•	•	•	•	•	•	•	•	•	•	•	•	14th	•	•	•	1
Mongolia	•	•	•	•	•	•	•	•	•	•	•	•	•	•	•	•	14th	11th	•	•	12th	•	3
Myanmar	•	•	•	•	•	•	•	•	•	•	•	•	•	•	•	•	16th	•	•	•	•	•	1
New Zealand	5th	•	9th	4th	•	10th	11th	7th	•	•	8th	10th	•	11th	•	•	•	•	12th	12th	•	•	11
North Korea	•	•	•	•	5th	4th	9th	•	•	•	•	•	7th	•	•	6th	•	•	•	•	•	•	5
Philippines	•	•	5th	•	•	13th	13th	8th	8th	•	•	8th	9th	•	•	•	12th	12th	8th	•	13th	•	11
Singapore	•	•	•	8th	•	•	•	•	•	•	•	•	•	•	•	•	•	•	•	•	•	•	1
South Korea	2nd	3rd	3rd	3rd	2nd	3rd	3rd	2nd	2nd	2nd	2nd	3rd	4th	4th	4th	3rd	3rd	2nd	3rd	3rd	6th	6th	22
Sri Lanka	•	•	•	•	•	12th	14th	•	•	•	9th	•	•	10th	14th	12th	15th	14th	13th	13th	•	•	10
Thailand	•	•	•	5th	6th	7th	7th	5th	5th	4th	3rd	4th	6th	3rd	1st	4th	1st	3rd	2nd	2nd	1st	1st	19
Turkmenistan	•	•	•	•	•	•	•	•	•	•	•	•	•	•	•	14th	•	•	•	•	•	•	1
Uzbekistan	•	•	•	•	•	•	6th	•	6th	7th	•	•	•	13th	12th	•	•	•	•	•	14th	•	6
Vietnam	•	•	•	•	•	8th	•	•	•	•	7th	6th	8th	7th	7th	7th	6th	5th	5th	•	4th	7th	12

Legend
1st	Champions
2nd	Runners-up
3rd	3rd place
4th	4th place
Q	Qualified for upcoming tournament
••	Qualified but withdrew
•	Did not qualify
×	Withdrew before qualification / Banned by FIVB
	Hosts
	Did not enter
—N/a	Not a FIVB member

=== Debut of teams ===
Year	Debutants	Total
1975	Australia, China, Japan, New Zealand, South Korea	5
1979	Hong Kong, India, Indonesia	3
1983	Chinese Taipei, Philippines	2
1987	Macau, Malaysia, Singapore, Thailand	4
1989	North Korea	1
1991	Sri Lanka, Vietnam	2
1993	Kazakhstan, Uzbekistan	2
1995	None	0
1997	None	0
1999	None	0
2001	None	0
2003	None	0
2005	None	0
2007	Iran	1
2009	None	0
2011	Turkmenistan	1
2013	Mongolia, Myanmar	2
2015	None	0
2017	Maldives	1
2019	None	0
2023	None	0
2026	Iraq	1

== Awards ==
=== Current awards ===
Year	Most Valuable Player
2003	(China) Zhao Ruirui
2005	(China) Chu Jinling
2007	(Japan) Miyuki Takahashi
2009	(Thailand) Onuma Sittirak
2011	(China) Wang Yimei
2013	(Thailand) Wilavan Apinyapong
2015	(China) Zhu Ting
2017	(Japan) Risa Shinnabe
2019	(Japan) Mayu Ishikawa
2023	(Thailand) Chatchu-on Moksri
2026	(Thailand) Pornpun Guedpard

Year	Best Setter
2003	(Japan) Yoshie Takeshita
2005	(China) Feng Kun
2007	(Thailand) Nootsara Tomkom
2009	(Thailand) Nootsara Tomkom
2011	(Japan) Yoshie Takeshita
2013	(Thailand) Nootsara Tomkom
2015	(China) Shen Jingsi
2017	(Thailand) Nootsara Tomkom
2019	(Thailand) Nootsara Tomkom
2023	(Thailand) Pornpun Guedpard
2026	(Thailand) Pornpun Guedpard

Year	Best Outside Spikers
2015	(China) Zhu Ting
2015	(South Korea) Kim Yeon-koung
2017	(South Korea) Kim Yeon-koung
2017	(Thailand) Chatchu-on Moksri
2019	(Japan) Mayu Ishikawa
2019	(South Korea) Kim Yeon-koung
2023	(Japan) Yuki Nishikawa
2023	(China) Wu Mengjie
2026	(Thailand) Sasipapron Janthawisut
2026	(China) Zhuang Yushan

Year	Best Middle Blocker(s)
2015	(Thailand) Pleumjit Thinkaow
2017	(Thailand) Hattaya Bamrungsuk
2017	(Japan) Nana Iwasaka
2019	(Japan) Nichika Yamada
2019	(China) Yang Hanyu
2023	(Thailand) Thatdao Nuekjang
2023	(China) Yang Hanyu
2026	(Thailand) Thatdao Nuekjang
2026	(China) Wang Yuanyuan

Year	Best Libero(s)
2009	(Thailand) Wanna Buakaew
2011	(South Korea) Nam Jie-youn
2013	(South Korea) Kim Hae-ran
2015	(South Korea) Nam Jie-youn
2017	(Japan) Mako Kobata
2017	(Philippines) Dawn Nicole Macandili
2019	(Thailand) Piyanut Pannoy
2023	(Japan) Manami Kojima
2026	(China) Wang Mengjie

Year	Best Opposite Spiker
2015	(China) Zeng Chunlei
2017	(China) Jin Ye
2019	(Japan) Haruna Soga
2023	(China) Zhou Yetong
2026	(Japan) Yukiko Wada

=== Former awards ===
Year	Best Scorer
2003	(South Korea) Choi Kwang-hee
2005	(Kazakhstan) Yelena Pavlova
2007	(Kazakhstan) Yelena Pavlova
2009	(South Korea) Kim Yeon-koung
2011	(South Korea) Kim Yeon-koung
2013	(South Korea) Kim Yeon-koung

Year	Best Spiker
2003	(Japan) Miyuki Takahashi
2005	(China) Chu Jinling
2007	(China) Xue Ming
2009	(China) Xue Ming
2011	(South Korea) Kim Yeon-koung
2013	(China) Zhu Ting

Year	Best Blocker
2003	(China) Zhao Ruirui
2005	(Chinese Taipei) Lin Chun-yi
2007	(Thailand) Pleumjit Thinkaow
2009	(China) Xue Ming
2011	(China) Yang Junjing
2013	(China) Xu Yunli

Year	Best Server
2003	(China) Yang Hao
2005	(Thailand) Amporn Hyapha
2007	(Japan) Saori Kimura
2009	(Japan) Saori Kimura
2011	(China) Wei Qiuyue
2013	(South Korea) Kim Yeon-koung

Year	Best Receiver
2003	(China) Zhang Na
2005	(China) Zhou Suhong
2007	(Japan) Yuko Sano

Year	Best Digger
2003	(Chinese Taipei) Fan Hsin-wen
2005	(Chinese Taipei) Chen Chia-chi
2007	(Thailand) Wanna Buakaew

== See also ==
- AVC Men's Volleyball Continental Championship
- AVC Women's Volleyball Cup
- AVC Women's U20 Volleyball Championship
- AVC Girls' U18 Volleyball Championship
- AVC Girls' U16 Volleyball Championship
- Volleyball at the Asian Games
