= 2003 Asian Women's Volleyball Championship =

International indoor volleyball tournament

Tournament details
- Host country: Vietnam
- City: Ho Chi Minh City
- Dates: 20–27 September
- Teams: 10 (from 1 confederation)
- Venue: 1 (in 1 host city)

Final positions
- Champions: China (10th title)
- Runners-up: Japan
- Third place: South Korea
- Fourth place: Thailand

Tournament awards
- MVP: (China) Zhao Ruirui

The 2003 Asian Women's Volleyball Championship was the twelfth edition of Asian Championship, a biennial international volleyball tournament organised by the Asian Volleyball Confederation (AVC) with Volleyball Federation of Vietnam (VFV). The tournament was held in Ho Chi Minh City, Vietnam from 20 to 27 September 2003.

== Pools composition ==
The teams are seeded based on their final ranking at the 2001 Asian Women's Volleyball Championship.

| Pool A | Pool B |
|---|---|
| Vietnam (Host); Thailand (3rd); Japan; Chinese Taipei; New Zealand | China (1st); South Korea (2nd); Philippines; Kazakhstan; Australia |

== Preliminary round ==
=== Pool A ===
| Pos | Team | Pld | W | L | Pts | SW | SL | SR | SPW | SPL | SPR | Qualification |
|---|---|---|---|---|---|---|---|---|---|---|---|---|
| 1 | Japan | 4 | 4 | 0 | 8 | 12 | 1 | 12.000 | 327 | 235 | 1.391 | Quarterfinals |
| 2 | Thailand | 4 | 3 | 1 | 7 | 9 | 4 | 2.250 | 302 | 240 | 1.258 | Quarterfinals |
| 3 | Chinese Taipei | 4 | 2 | 2 | 6 | 8 | 6 | 1.333 | 312 | 279 | 1.118 | Quarterfinals |
| 4 | Vietnam | 4 | 1 | 3 | 5 | 3 | 9 | 0.333 | 230 | 273 | 0.842 | Quarterfinals |
| 5 | New Zealand | 4 | 0 | 4 | 4 | 0 | 12 | 0.000 | 156 | 300 | 0.520 | |

| Date | Time | | Score | | Set 1 | Set 2 | Set 3 | Set 4 | Set 5 | Total |
|---|---|---|---|---|---|---|---|---|---|---|
| 20 Sep | 17:00 | Japan | 3–0 | Thailand | 25–18 | 25–23 | 25–15 | | | 75–56 |
| 20 Sep | 20:00 | Vietnam | 3–0 | New Zealand | 25–19 | 25–7 | 25–16 | | | 75–42 |
| 21 Sep | 18:00 | Chinese Taipei | 3–0 | New Zealand | 25–8 | 25–15 | 25–8 | | | 75–31 |
| 21 Sep | 20:00 | Vietnam | 0–3 | Japan | 14–25 | 12–25 | 29–31 | | | 55–81 |
| 22 Sep | 16:00 | Chinese Taipei | 1–3 | Japan | 21–25 | 25–21 | 21–25 | 12–25 | | 79–96 |
| 22 Sep | 18:00 | Thailand | 3–0 | Vietnam | 25–18 | 25–12 | 25–14 | | | 75–44 |
| 23 Sep | 14:00 | New Zealand | 0–3 | Japan | 11–25 | 17–25 | 17–25 | | | 45–75 |
| 23 Sep | 16:00 | Thailand | 3–1 | Chinese Taipei | 21–25 | 25–17 | 25–21 | 25–20 | | 96–83 |
| 24 Sep | 14:00 | New Zealand | 0–3 | Thailand | 17–25 | 14–25 | 7–25 | | | 38–75 |
| 24 Sep | 16:00 | Vietnam | 0–3 | Chinese Taipei | 22–25 | 13–25 | 21–25 | | | 56–75 |

=== Pool B ===
| Pos | Team | Pld | W | L | Pts | SW | SL | SR | SPW | SPL | SPR | Qualification |
|---|---|---|---|---|---|---|---|---|---|---|---|---|
| 1 | China | 4 | 4 | 0 | 8 | 12 | 1 | 12.000 | 328 | 219 | 1.498 | Quarterfinals |
| 2 | South Korea | 4 | 3 | 1 | 7 | 10 | 4 | 2.500 | 330 | 253 | 1.304 | Quarterfinals |
| 3 | Kazakhstan | 4 | 2 | 2 | 6 | 6 | 7 | 0.857 | 260 | 265 | 0.981 | Quarterfinals |
| 4 | Philippines | 4 | 1 | 3 | 5 | 3 | 11 | 0.273 | 222 | 323 | 0.687 | Quarterfinals |
| 5 | Australia | 4 | 0 | 4 | 4 | 4 | 12 | 0.333 | 284 | 364 | 0.780 | |

| Date | Time | | Score | | Set 1 | Set 2 | Set 3 | Set 4 | Set 5 | Total |
|---|---|---|---|---|---|---|---|---|---|---|
| 20 Sep | 13:00 | Philippines | 3–2 | Australia | 23–25 | 25–22 | 25–14 | 12–25 | 15–12 | 100–98 |
| 20 Sep | 15:00 | China | 3–0 | Kazakhstan | 25–12 | 25–13 | 25–14 | | | 75–39 |
| 21 Sep | 14:00 | South Korea | 3–1 | Australia | 25–16 | 20–25 | 25–13 | 25–13 | | 95–67 |
| 21 Sep | 16:00 | China | 3–0 | Philippines | 25–16 | 25–7 | 25–22 | | | 75–45 |
| 22 Sep | 14:00 | Kazakhstan | 3–0 | Philippines | 25–15 | 25–12 | 25–19 | | | 75–46 |
| 22 Sep | 20:00 | South Korea | 1–3 | China | 21–25 | 13–25 | 30–28 | 21–25 | | 85–103 |
| 23 Sep | 18:00 | Australia | 0–3 | China | 14–25 | 19–25 | 17–25 | | | 50–75 |
| 23 Sep | 20:00 | Kazakhstan | 0–3 | South Korea | 18–25 | 14–25 | 20–25 | | | 52–75 |
| 24 Sep | 18:00 | Philippines | 0–3 | South Korea | 14–25 | 10–25 | 7–25 | | | 31–75 |
| 24 Sep | 20:00 | Australia | 1–3 | Kazakhstan | 25–19 | 14–25 | 17–25 | 13–25 | | 69–94 |

== Classification 9th–10th ==
| Date | Time | | Score | | Set 1 | Set 2 | Set 3 | Set 4 | Set 5 | Total |
|---|---|---|---|---|---|---|---|---|---|---|
| 25 Sep | 20:00 | New Zealand | 0–3 | Australia | 19–25 | 16–25 | 19–25 | | | 54–75 |

== Final round ==
Quarterfinals
25 September – Ho Chi Minh City
Japan | 3
Philippines | 0
25 September – Ho Chi Minh City
South Korea | 3
Chinese Taipei | 0
25 September – Ho Chi Minh City
China | 3
Vietnam | 0
25 September – Ho Chi Minh City
Thailand | 3
Kazakhstan | 0

Semifinals
26 September – Ho Chi Minh City
Japan | 3
South Korea | 0
26 September – Ho Chi Minh City
China | 3
Thailand | 0

Final
27 September – Ho Chi Minh City
Japan | 0
China | 3
3rd place
27 September – Ho Chi Minh City
South Korea | 3
Thailand | 1

5th–8th places
26 September – Ho Chi Minh City
Philippines | 0
Chinese Taipei | 3
26 September – Ho Chi Minh City
Vietnam | 3
Kazakhstan | 2

5th place
27 September – Ho Chi Minh City
Chinese Taipei | 3
Vietnam | 0
7th place
27 September – Ho Chi Minh City
Philippines | 0
Kazakhstan | 3

=== Quarterfinals ===
| Date | Time | | Score | | Set 1 | Set 2 | Set 3 | Set 4 | Set 5 | Total |
|---|---|---|---|---|---|---|---|---|---|---|
| 25 Sep | 12:00 | Japan | 3–0 | Philippines | 25–16 | 25–23 | 25–17 | | | 75–56 |
| 25 Sep | 14:00 | Thailand | 3–0 | Kazakhstan | 25–20 | 25–18 | 25–19 | | | 75–57 |
| 25 Sep | 16:00 | South Korea | 3–0 | Chinese Taipei | 25–19 | 25–15 | 25–14 | | | 75–48 |
| 25 Sep | 18:00 | China | 3–0 | Vietnam | 25–18 | 25–13 | 25–10 | | | 75–41 |

=== 5th–8th semifinals ===
| Date | Time | | Score | | Set 1 | Set 2 | Set 3 | Set 4 | Set 5 | Total |
|---|---|---|---|---|---|---|---|---|---|---|
| 26 Sep | 14:00 | Philippines | 0–3 | Chinese Taipei | 18–25 | 16–25 | 11–25 | | | 45–75 |
| 26 Sep | 16:00 | Vietnam | 3–2 | Kazakhstan | 25–16 | 19–25 | 16–25 | 25–18 | 15–9 | 100–93 |

=== Semifinals ===
| Date | Time | | Score | | Set 1 | Set 2 | Set 3 | Set 4 | Set 5 | Total |
|---|---|---|---|---|---|---|---|---|---|---|
| 26 Sep | 18:00 | Japan | 3–0 | South Korea | 26–24 | 25–21 | 25–19 | | | 76–64 |
| 26 Sep | 20:00 | China | 3–0 | Thailand | 25–17 | 25–19 | 25–17 | | | 75–53 |

=== 7th place ===
| Date | Time | | Score | | Set 1 | Set 2 | Set 3 | Set 4 | Set 5 | Total |
|---|---|---|---|---|---|---|---|---|---|---|
| 27 Sep | 14:00 | Philippines | 0–3 | Kazakhstan | 0–25 | 0–25 | 0–25 | | | Forfeit |

=== 5th place ===
| Date | Time | | Score | | Set 1 | Set 2 | Set 3 | Set 4 | Set 5 | Total |
|---|---|---|---|---|---|---|---|---|---|---|
| 27 Sep | 16:00 | Chinese Taipei | 3–0 | Vietnam | 25–18 | 25–19 | 25–15 | | | 75–52 |

=== 3rd place ===
| Date | Time | | Score | | Set 1 | Set 2 | Set 3 | Set 4 | Set 5 | Total |
|---|---|---|---|---|---|---|---|---|---|---|
| 27 Sep | 18:00 | South Korea | 3–1 | Thailand | 23–25 | 25–12 | 25–12 | 25–14 | | 98–63 |

=== Final ===
| Date | Time | | Score | | Set 1 | Set 2 | Set 3 | Set 4 | Set 5 | Total |
|---|---|---|---|---|---|---|---|---|---|---|
| 27 Sep | 20:00 | Japan | 0–3 | China | 21–25 | 23–25 | 15–25 | | | 59–75 |

== Final standing ==
| Rank | Team |
|---|---|
| 1st place, gold medalist(s) | China |
| 2nd place, silver medalist(s) | Japan |
| 3rd place, bronze medalist(s) | South Korea |
| 4 | Thailand |
| 5 | Chinese Taipei |
| 6 | Vietnam |
| 7 | Kazakhstan |
| 8 | Philippines |
| 9 | Australia |
| 10 | New Zealand |

| Qualified for the 2003 World Cup and 2004 Olympic Qualifier |
| Qualified for the 2004 Olympic Qualifier |

2003 Asian Women's champions

China
10th title

== Awards ==
- MVP: (China) Zhao Ruirui
- Best scorer: (South Korea) Choi Kwang-hee
- Best spiker: (Japan) Miyuki Takahashi
- Best blocker: (China) Zhao Ruirui
- Best server: (China) Yang Hao
- Best setter: (Japan) Yoshie Takeshita
- Best digger: (Chinese Taipei) Fan Hsin-wen
- Best receiver: (China) Zhang Na
- Miss Volleyball: (Vietnam) Pham Thi Kim Hue
