= 2023 Indonesian women's Proliga =

Indonesian volleyball league

- Association: PBVSI
- League: Proliga
- Sport: Volleyball
- Duration: 5 January – 19 March 2023
- Games: -
- Teams: 6
- TV partners: Moji; Champions TV 3; Nex Parabola; MNC Sports 3; Usee Sports 2; Vidio

Regular season
- Top seed: Jakarta Pertamina Fastron
- Top scorer: (Brazil) Fernanda Tomé

Finals
- Champions: Bandung BJB Tandamata
- Runners-up: Jakarta Pertamina Fastron
- Finals MVP: (Indonesia) Mediol Yoku

Indonesian women's Proliga seasons

The 2023 Indonesian women's Proliga (or 2023 PLN Mobile Proliga for sponsorship reasons) is the 21st season of Indonesian women's Proliga, The Indonesian professional volleyball league organized by the Indonesian Volleyball Federation since 2002. The season start on 5 January 2023 and conclude on 19 March 2023.

This season composed of 6 teams, including the one new teams — Jakarta BIN. Bandung BJB Tandamata are the defending champions women's Proliga, and they won their fourth title after defeating Jakarta Pertamina Fastron in five sets on the final.

== Teams ==
=== Personnel ===
2023 Indonesian women's Proliga
Club		Head Coach	Captain	Location	Main Sponsor
BJB	Bandung BJB Tandamata	(Indonesia) Alim Suseno	(Indonesia) Wilda Nurfadhilah	Bandung, West Java	Bank BJB
GPP	Gresik Petrokimia Pupuk Indonesia	(Indonesia) Ayub Hidayat	(Indonesia) Mediol Yoku	Gresik, East Java	Pupuk Indonesia Holding Company
BIN	Jakarta BIN	(Indonesia) Oktavian	(Indonesia) Ratri Wulandari	Jakarta	BIN
JEP	Jakarta Elektrik PLN	(Azerbaijan) Ziya Racabov	(Indonesia) Lutfiyatul Insyah	Jakarta	Perusahaan Listrik Negara
JPF	Jakarta Pertamina Fastron	(Indonesia) Eko Waluyo	(Indonesia) Agustin Wulandari	Jakarta	Pertamina
JPP	Jakarta Popsivo Polwan	(Thailand) Chamnan Dokmai	(Dominican Republic) Niverka Marte	Jakarta	Indonesia National Police

=== Foreign players ===
Foreign player regulations In implementing the 2023 Proliga this season, each team must sign 1 foreign player and a maximum of 2 foreign players. In the second leg regular season each team is allowed to replace 1 foreign player.

The list of 2023 Indonesian women's Proliga Foreign Players
Club	Player 1	Player 2
Bandung BJB Tandamata	(Dominican Republic) Madeline Guillén	(Turkey) Ceren Kapucu
Gresik Petrokimia Pupuk Indonesia	(Ukraine) Bogdana Anisova	(Argentina) Julieta Lazcano
Jakarta BIN	(China) Chen Peiyan	~~(China) Jin Ye~~ (Brazil) Fernanda Tomé
Jakarta Elektrik PLN	(Azerbaijan) Katerina Zhidkova	~~(Dominican Republic) Vielka Peralta~~ (Azerbaijan) (Uzbekistan) Odina Aliyeva
Jakarta Pertamina Fastron	(Serbia) Marija Zelenović	(Ukraine) Oleksandra Bytsenko
Jakarta Popsivo Polwan	(Brazil) Franciane Richter	(Dominican Republic) Niverka Marte

== Schedule and venues ==
The 2023 Indonesian women's Proliga take place in eight cities. The regular season held from 5 January to 19 February 2023 which take place in six cities, namely Bandung, Purwokerto, Palembang, Gresik, Malang and Yogyakarta.

The final round which held from 23 February to 19 March 2023 take place in four cities, namely Gresik, Semarang, Solo and Yogyakarta. The following is the schedule and venues for the 2023 Indonesian women's Proliga:

Season		Date	Venues
Regular season	Leg 1	January 5–8, 2023	Gelora Sabilulungan Jalak Harupat, Bandung, West Java
Regular season	Leg 1	January 12–15, 2023	GOR Satria, Banyumas, Central Java
Regular season	Leg 1	January 19–22, 2023	Palembang Sport and Convention Center, Palembang, South Sumatra
Regular season	Leg 2	February 2–5, 2023	Gedung Serbaguna Tri Dharma, Gresik, East Java
Regular season	Leg 2	February 9–12, 2023	GOR Ken Arok, Malang, East Java
Regular season	Leg 2	February 16–19, 2023	GOR Universitas Negeri Yogyakarta, Sleman, Yogyakarta
Final round	Semifinals	February 23–26, 2023	Gedung Serbaguna Tri Dharma, Gresik, East Java
Final round	Semifinals	March 2–5, 2023	GOR Jatidiri, Semarang, Central Java
Final round	Semifinals	March 9–12, 2023	Sritex Arena, Surakarta, Central Java
Final round	Final	March 18–19, 2023	GOR Among Rogo, Yogyakarta

== Regular season ==
- Sixth teams play 2 legs with a double round robin system.
- The top four ranked teams advance to the final round.
- All times are local, WIB (UTC+07:00)

=== League table ===
Pos	Team	Pld	W	L	Pts	SW	SL	SR	SPW	SPL	SPR	Qualification
1	Jakarta Pertamina Fastron	10	7	3	21	25	16	1.563	921	880	1.047	Qualified for the Final round
2	Bandung BJB Tandamata	10	6	4	19	22	16	1.375	884	808	1.094	Qualified for the Final round
3	Jakarta BIN	10	6	4	18	23	18	1.278	894	887	1.008	Qualified for the Final round
4	Gresik Petrokimia Pupuk Indonesia	10	5	5	13	21	22	0.955	928	917	1.012	Qualified for the Final round
5	Jakarta Popsivo Polwan	10	4	6	9	14	25	0.560	809	910	0.889	
6	Jakarta Elektrik PLN	10	2	8	9	16	24	0.667	857	905	0.947	

Source: proliga.co.id

=== Fixtures and results ===
Leg 1

Date	Time		Score		Set 1	Set 2	Set 3	Set 4	Set 5	Total	Report
Week 1 — Kab. Bandung
5 Jan	12:30	Gresik Petrokimia Pupuk Indonesia	1–3	Bandung BJB Tandamata	19–25	25–22	13–25	18–25		75–97	Laporan
6 Jan	14:00	Jakarta Popsivo Polwan	0–3	Jakarta Pertamina Fastron	22–25	20–25	17–25			59–75	Laporan
7 Jan	12:00	Jakarta Elektrik PLN	1–3	Jakarta BIN	23–25	21–25	25–20	29–31		98–101	Laporan
7 Jan	17:00	Gresik Petrokimia Pupuk Indonesia	3–2	Jakarta Pertamina Fastron	22–25	25–17	19–25	25–17	16–14	107–98	Laporan
8 Jan	16:00	Jakarta BIN	0–3	Bandung BJB Tandamata	16–25	19–25	16–25			51–75	Laporan
Week 2 — Banyumas
12 Jan	12:00	Jakarta Popsivo Polwan	3–2	Jakarta Elektrik PLN	19–25	25–22	25–23	19–25	15–11	103–106	Laporan
12 Jan	17:15	Jakarta Pertamina Fastron	3–1	Bandung BJB Tandamata	23–25	26–24	25–15	25–20		99–84	Laporan
13 Jan	14:00	Gresik Petrokimia Pupuk Indonesia	1–3	Jakarta BIN	18–25	23–25	25–18	18–25		84–93	Laporan
14 Jan	16:00	Jakarta Elektrik PLN	1–3	Jakarta Pertamina Fastron	25–17	23–25	16–25	20–25		84–92	Laporan
15 Jan	16:00	Jakarta Popsivo Polwan	0–3	Gresik Petrokimia Pupuk Indonesia	18–25	20–25	28–30			66–80	Laporan
Week 3 — Palembang
19 Jan	12:00	Jakarta Elektrik PLN	2–3	Gresik Petrokimia Pupuk Indonesia	26–24	14–25	25–20	23–25	5–15	93–109	Laporan
19 Jan	16:00	Jakarta Popsivo Polwan	1–3	Bandung BJB Tandamata	16–25	21–25	25–17	20–25		82–92	Laporan
20 Jan	14:00	Jakarta BIN	1–3	Jakarta Pertamina Fastron	25–21	14–25	18–25	20–25		77–96	Laporan
21 Jan	16:00	Jakarta Elektrik PLN	0–3	Bandung BJB Tandamata	21–25	19–25	22–25			62–75	Laporan
22 Jan	16:00	Jakarta Popsivo Polwan	3–2	Jakarta BIN	28–26	20–25	28–26	16–25	15–13	107–115	Laporan

Leg 2

Date	Time		Score		Set 1	Set 2	Set 3	Set 4	Set 5	Total	Report
Week 4 — Gresik
2 Feb	12:00	Jakarta Elektrik PLN	2–3	Jakarta BIN	25–17	18–25	26–24	19–25	15–17	103–108	Laporan
3 Feb	14:00	Bandung BJB Tandamata	0–3	Jakarta BIN	17–25	20–25	22–25			59–75	Laporan
4 Feb	12:00	Jakarta Popsivo Polwan	1–3	Jakarta Pertamina Fastron	20–25	25–23	20–25	22–25		87–98	Laporan
4 Feb	16:00	Bandung BJB Tandamata	3–1	Gresik Petrokimia Pupuk Indonesia	27–25	25–15	21–25	25–11		98–76	Laporan
5 Feb	16:00	Jakarta Pertamina Fastron	3–2	Gresik Petrokimia Pupuk Indonesia	25–23	18–25	23–25	25–18	15–12	106–103	Laporan
Week 5 — Malang
9 Feb	12:00	Jakarta BIN	2–3	Gresik Petrokimia Pupuk Indonesia	25–23	21–25	25–20	17–25	9–15	97–108	Laporan
9 Feb	16:00	Jakarta Elektrik PLN	3–0	Jakarta Popsivo Polwan	25–21	25–15	25–21			75–57	Laporan
10 Feb	14:00	Bandung BJB Tandamata	1–3	Jakarta Pertamina Fastron	20–25	23–25	31–29	23–25		97–104	Laporan
11 Feb	16:00	Jakarta Popsivo Polwan	0–3	Jakarta BIN	14–25	19–25	24–26			57–76	Laporan
12 Feb	16:00	Jakarta Elektrik PLN	1–3	Bandung BJB Tandamata	19–25	18–25	25–23	18–25		80–98	Laporan
Week 6 — Sleman
16 Feb	12:00	Jakarta Elektrik PLN	1–3	Gresik Petrokimia Pupuk Indonesia	26–24	26–28	12–25	17–25		81–102	Laporan
16 Feb	16:00	Jakarta Popsivo Polwan	3–2	Bandung BJB Tandamata	25–21	19–25	30–28	15–25	15–10	104–109	Laporan
17 Feb	14:00	Jakarta Pertamina Fastron	2–3	Jakarta BIN	21–25	25–20	25–16	20–25	9–15	100–101	Laporan
18 Feb	16:00	Jakarta Popsivo Polwan	3–1	Gresik Petrokimia Pupuk Indonesia	25–15	16–25	25–23	25–21		91–84	Laporan
19 Feb	16:00	Jakarta Elektrik PLN	3–0	Jakarta Pertamina Fastron	25–15	25–21	25–23			75–59	Laporan

== Final round ==
- In the final round Indonesian Volleyball Federation use video challenge technology.
- Four teams played 2 legs with a double round robin system.
- 3rd and 4th rank advance to the 3rd place match, and 1st and 2nd rank advance to the final.
- All times are local, WIB (UTC+07:00)

=== League table ===
Pos	Team	Pld	W	L	Pts	SW	SL	SR	SPW	SPL	SPR	Qualification
1	Bandung BJB Tandamata	6	5	1	13	15	8	1.875	531	496	1.071	Advance for the Final Match
2	Jakarta Pertamina Fastron	6	3	3	9	11	12	0.917	505	516	0.979	Advance for the Final Match
3	Gresik Petrokimia Pupuk Indonesia	6	2	4	8	11	14	0.786	534	547	0.976	3rd place match
4	Jakarta BIN	6	2	4	6	11	14	0.786	566	577	0.981	3rd place match

Source: proliga.co.id

=== Fixtures and results ===
Date	Time		Score		Set 1	Set 2	Set 3	Set 4	Set 5	Total	Report
Week 7 — Gresik
23 Feb	16:00	Bandung BJB Tandamata	3–2	Jakarta BIN	21–25	25–23	28–26	24–26	15–12	113–112	Report
24 Feb	16:00	Jakarta Pertamina Fastron	1–3	Gresik Petrokimia Pupuk Indonesia	25–23	14–25	19–25	19–25		77–98	Report
25 Feb	16:00	Bandung BJB Tandamata	3–2	Gresik Petrokimia Pupuk Indonesia	33–31	20–25	19–25	25–19	15–9	112–109	Laporan
26 Feb	16:00	Jakarta Pertamina Fastron	3–1	Jakarta BIN	33–31	17–25	25–18	25–22		100–96	Laporan
Week 8 — Semarang
2 Mar	18:30	Jakarta BIN	3–2	Gresik Petrokimia Pupuk Indonesia	25–18	23–25	25–20	21–25	15–13	109–101	Laporan
3 Mar	18:30	Jakarta Pertamina Fastron	0–3	Bandung BJB Tandamata	18–25	20–25	15–25			53–75	Laporan
4 Mar	18:30	Bandung BJB Tandamata	0–3	Jakarta BIN	28–30	24–26	15–25			67–81	Laporan
5 Mar	18:30	Gresik Petrokimia Pupuk Indonesia	1–3	Jakarta Pertamina Fastron	25–17	18–25	17–25	12–25		72–92	Laporan
Week 9 — Surakarta
9 Mar	16:00	Bandung BJB Tandamata	3–0	Gresik Petrokimia Pupuk Indonesia	25–17	25–21	25–20			75–58	Laporan
10 Mar	16:00	Jakarta Pertamina Fastron	3–1	Jakarta BIN	25–27	25–23	25–18	25–18		100–86	Laporan
11 Mar	16:00	Jakarta BIN	1–3	Gresik Petrokimia Pupuk Indonesia	23–25	25–21	17–25	17–25		82–96	Laporan
12 Mar	16:00	Jakarta Pertamina Fastron	1–3	Bandung BJB Tandamata	18–25	17–25	25–14	23–25		83–89	Laporan

=== Grand final ===
Date	Time		Score		Set 1	Set 2	Set 3	Set 4	Set 5	Total	Report
Week 10 — Yogyakarta
3rd place match
18 Mar	14:00	Gresik Petrokimia Pupuk Indonesia	3–0	Jakarta BIN	27–25	25–20	25–18			77–63	Laporan
Final
18 Mar	16:00	Bandung BJB Tandamata	3–2	Jakarta Pertamina Fastron	27–25	25–22	24–26	20–25	15–8	111–106	

== Final standings ==
Rank	Team
1st place, gold medalist(s)	Bandung BJB Tandamata
2nd place, silver medalist(s)	Jakarta Pertamina Fastron
3rd place, bronze medalist(s)	Gresik Petrokimia Pupuk Indonesia
4	Jakarta BIN
5	Jakarta Popsivo Polwan
6	Jakarta Elektrik PLN

2023 women's Proliga Champions

Bandung BJB Tandamata

women's roster
Yulis, Sari, Dya Hawa, Syavina, Wintang, Tanisa, Miva, Madeline, Rika, Fitriyani, Tasya, Tiara, Wilda, Dian, Ceren, Shella, Maradanti
Head coach
(Indonesia) Alim Suseno
