= Yeliz Başa =

Turkish volleyball player

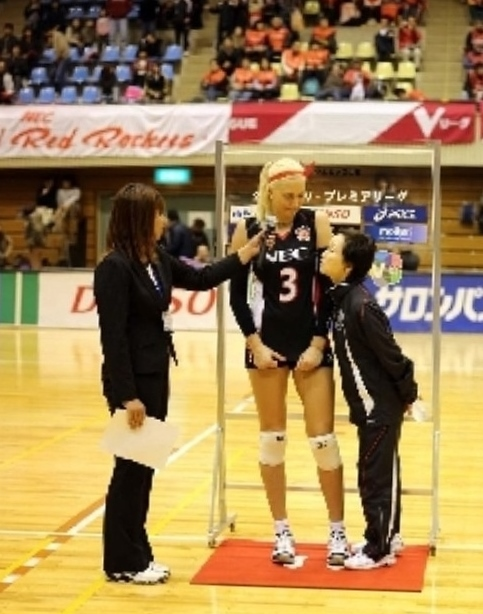
- Yeliz Başa with NEC Red Rockets in 2013.

Personal information
- Born: Yeliz Askan; August 13, 1987 (age 39) Beykoz, Istanbul, Turkey
- Height: 1.88 m (6 ft 2 in)
- Weight: 79 kg (174 lb)
- Spike: 305 cm (120 in)
- Block: 301 cm (119 in)

Volleyball information
- Position: Opposite/Outside Hitter
- Current club: San Diego Mojo
- Number: 21

National team
- Years: Team
- 2012-2020: Turkey
Honours
Women's volleyball
Representing Turkey
Women's European Volleyball League
Gold medal – first place	2014	Team
- Updated on July 19, 2014

Yeliz Başa (born Yeliz Askan on August 13, 1987 in Beykoz, Istanbul, Turkey) is a Turkish female volleyball player, who won the gold medal at the 2014 Women's European Volleyball League playing with the Turkey women's national volleyball team.

== Career ==
She began her sports career at the age of 14 in the youth team of Beykozspor in her hometown. She transferred to Beşiktaş one year later. After playing for the youth team from 2002 to 2004, and for the juniors team from 2004 to 2006, she entered the senior team, where she was part of until 2012.

Her successful performance in 2011–12 season led her to the membership in the Turkey women's national volleyball team.

In the 2012–13 season, she transferred to NEC Red Rockets in Japan after signing a one-year contract. She became so the first ever Turkish women's volleyball player in Japan. She enjoyed champion title in the Japan's V.League after winning 23 of the 28 matches. Named MVP in many games, she contributed to her team's champion title.

The next season, she signed a contract for one year with Hyundai Hillstate in South Korea. She also became the first ever Turkish volleyball player in South Korea.

She returned to Japanese NEC Red Rockets team and played 2014-2016 seasons. In the summer of 2016, she signed with the Czech Republic's Agel Prostejov team and was transferred to Halbank, Turkey in January 2017.

== Personal life ==
Yeliz Başa is married to Onur Başa in 2013.

== Clubs ==
- (Turkey) Beykozspor (2001–02) (junior team)
- (Turkey) Beşiktaş (2002–12)
- (Japan) NEC Red Rockets (2012–13)
- (South Korea) Hyundai Hillstate (2013–14)
- (Japan) NEC Red Rockets (2014–16)
- (Czech Republic) Agel Prostějov (2016–17)
- (Turkey) Halkbank (2017–18)
- (Indonesia) Gresik Petrokimia (2018)
- (Indonesia) Jakarta PGN Popsivo (2018–19)
- (Thailand) Nakhon Ratchasima (2019) (loan)
- (Vietnam) Đức Giang Hà Nội (2019) (loan)
- (Albania) Partizani Tirane (2019–20)
- (Puerto Rico) Llaneras de Toa Baja (2020)
- (Thailand) Nakhon Ratchasima (2020–21)
- (Turkey) Bodrum Belediyespor (2021–22)
- (Italy) Anthea Vicenza (2021–22)
- (Indonesia) Bandung BJB Tandamata (2022)
- (Philippines) Creamline Cool Smashers (2022)
- (Thailand) Supreme Dhippaya Chonburi E-Tech (2022–23)
- (Turkey) Bodrum Belediyespor (2023–24)
- (Puerto Rico) Cangrejeras de Santurce (2023–24)
- (Vietnam) Quảng Ninh (2024)
- (United States) San Diego Mojo (2024-)

== Awards ==
=== Individuals ===
- 2009 Balkan Cup "Best Striker" with Beşiktaş
- 2019 Thai–Denmark Super League "Best outside hitter" with Nakhon Ratchasima
- 2020-21 Thailand League "Best opposite Spike" with Nakhon Ratchasima

=== Club ===
- 2003-04 Turkish Women's Volleyball League - Runner-up, with Beşiktaş
- 2008 BVA Cup - Champion, with Beşiktaş
- 2009 BVA Cup - Champion, with Beşiktaş
- 2014 Korean KOVO Cup - Champion, with Hyundai Hillstate
- 2013 Kurowashiki All Japan Volleyball Championship - Runner-up, with NEC Red Rockets
- 2014–15 Japan Volleyball League/V.League/V.Premier League - Champion, with NEC Red Rockets
- 2016-17 Czech Women's Volleyball Extraliga - Champion, with Agel Prostějov
- 2018-19 Indonesia Proliga - Champion, with Jakarta PGN Popsivo
- 2018–19 Thailand League – Champion, with Nakhon Ratchasima
- 2019 Thai–Denmark Super League – Runner-up, with Nakhon Ratchasima
- 2020-21 Thailand League – Runner-up, with Nakhon Ratchasima
- 2022 Indonesia Proliga - - Champion, with Bandung BJB Tandamata
- 2022 Premier Volleyball League Reinforced Conference – Third place, with Creamline Cool Smashers

=== National team ===
- 2012 – World Grand Prix - Third place
- 2014 European League – Champion

== See also ==
- Turkish women in sports
