= Megawati Hangestri Pertiwi =

Indonesian volleyball player (born 1999)

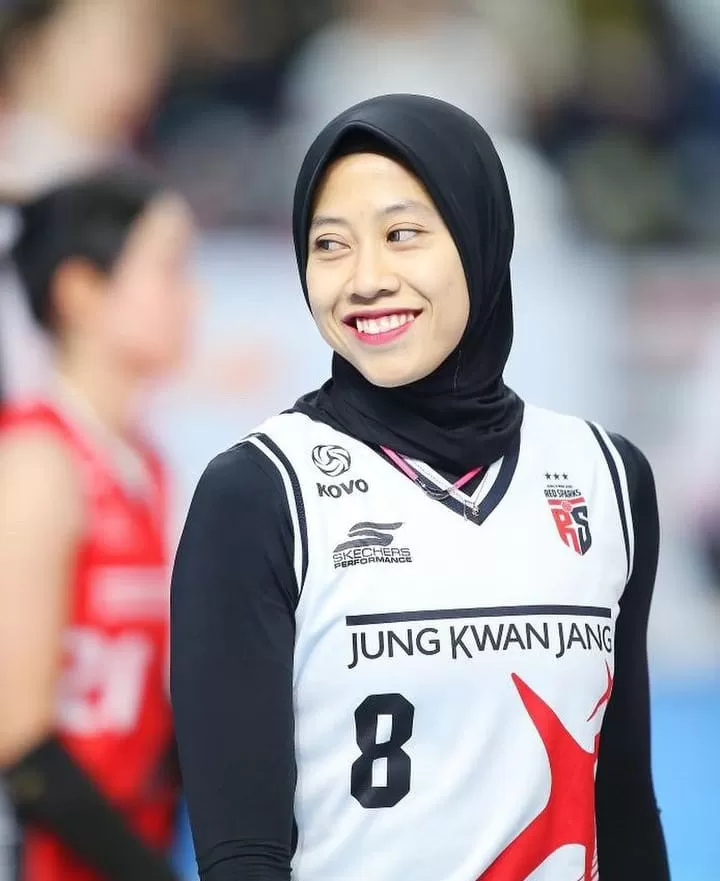
- Megawati with the Daejeon Red Sparks in 2023

Personal information
- Full name: Megawati Hangestri Pertiwi
- Nickname: Mega, Megatron
- Nationality: Indonesian
- Born: 20 September 1999 (age 27); Jember, East Java, Indonesia
- Height: 185 cm (6 ft 1 in)
- Weight: 65 kg (143 lb)
- Spike: 322 cm (127 in)
- Block: 315 cm (124 in)
- Education: Universitas Kahuripan Kediri

Volleyball information
- Position: Outside hitter/Opposite hitter
- Current club: Suwon Hyundai Engineering & Construction Hillstate
- Number: 8 (klub); 3 (national team)

Career
Years	Teams
2015–2019	(Indonesia) Jakarta Pertamina Energi
2016–2019	(Indonesia) Surabaya Bank Jatim
2019–2020	(Indonesia) Jakarta BNI 46
2020–2021	(Thailand) Supreme Chonburi
2021–2022	(Vietnam) Hà Phú Thanh Hóa
2021–2022	(Indonesia) Bandung BJB Tandamata
2022–2023	(Indonesia) Jakarta Pertamina Fastron
2023–2024	(Indonesia) Jakarta BIN
2023–2025	(South Korea) Daejeon Red Sparks
2024–2025	(Indonesia) Gresik Petrokimia
2025–2026	(Indonesia) Jakarta Pertamina Enduro
2026–	(South Korea) Hyundai Hillstate

National team
Indonesia
Honours
Women's volleyball
Representing Indonesia
Asian Challenge Cup
Silver medal – second place	2023 Gresik	Team
SEA Games
Silver medal – second place	2017 Kuala Lumpur	Team
Bronze medal – third place	2019 Pasig	Team
Bronze medal – third place	2021 Quảng Ninh	Team
Bronze medal – third place	2023 Phnom Penh	Team
Bronze medal – third place	2025 Bangkok	Team
VTV Cup
Silver medal – second place	2017 Hải Dương	Team
ASEAN Grand Prix
Silver medal – second place	2019 Nakhon Ratchasima	Team
Bronze medal – third place	2022 Nakhon Ratchasima	Team

Megawati Hangestri Pertiwi (born 20 September 1999), often known mononymously as Megawati, is an Indonesian indoor volleyball player. She is a member of the Indonesia women's national volleyball team.

Megawati participated in the 2017 SEA Games. In the semifinal, she contributed the highest points when competing with Vietnam in five sets and made Indonesia qualify for the final after the last time in 1991. In the final, Indonesia lost to Thailand and won a silver medal. In 2023, Megawati was contracted with the Red Sparks.

== Careers ==
Megawati has been a volleyball player since the age of 14. Her professional career began as one of the young players in the Surabaya Bank Jatim squad during the Livoli Divisi Utama in 2015. In the Proliga, she played for Jakarta Pertamina Fastron from the 2015 season until the 2017 season, and continued in the 2022 season. She briefly moved to Jakarta BNI 46 in the 2018 season and then to Bandung BJB Tandamata as Indonesia's representative in the ASEAN Grand Prix 2022.

In 2021, Megawati started exploring a career abroad by joining the Thai club Supreme Chonburi-E.Tech in the Thailand League for one season. She then played for the Vietnamese club Hà Phú Thanh Hóa in the Vietnam Volleyball League 2022 after the Proliga 2022 concluded.

In mid-2023, Megawati was selected in the Asian player draft and signed a one-year contract with the South Korean volleyball club, Red Sparks, for the 2023-24 season. A South Korean media OSEN praised Megawati's performance as a new player for Red Sparks. The Red Sparks club, which struggled last season, has started to rise again thanks to Megawati and her teammate Giovanna. She helped her team reach the playoffs for the first time in seven years and finished in third place at the end of the season. Megawati returned to Indonesia to play for Jakarta BIN in the Proliga 2024, successfully leading her team to their first championship title and achieving her first title in her career. After the Proliga 2024 ended, she returned to Red Sparks after Ko Hee-jin selected her in the Asian Draft Quarter organized by KOVO. In the PON 2024 competition held in Aceh-North Sumatra, she successfully brought home a gold medal for the East Java Women's Volleyball Team.

After her successful stint with Red Sparks in the 2024–2025 South Korean V-League season, where she led the team to a runner-up finish and earned widespread acclaim for her powerful spikes and scoring prowess, Megawati briefly returned to Indonesia in 2025 to compete for Gresik Petrokimia Pupuk Indonesia in the Proliga final four. Despite a loss in her debut match with the team, her impact as a versatile and dynamic player remained evident.

In August 2025, Megawati signed with Manisa Büyükşehir Belediyespor Kulübü (Manisa BBSK) in Turkey’s Kadınlar 1. Ligi for the 2025–2026 season. She passed her medical tests and joined the team for pre-season training. However, her stint in Turkey ended prematurely before making her official league debut. Due to scheduling conflicts with her domestic commitments in Indonesia, including playing for Surabaya Bank Jatim in the 2025 Livoli Divisi Utama and early national team preparations for the 2025 SEA Games, Megawati and Manisa BBSK mutually agreed to terminate her contract on October 23, 2025.

Following her departure from Turkey, Megawati returned to Indonesia and competed in the domestic Proliga 2026 season, where she played for Jakarta Pertamina Enduro and successfully led the team to a championship victory. In May 2026, it was officially announced that Megawati would return to the South Korean V-League for the 2026–2027 season. She was selected during the Asia Quarter draft to join the reigning champions, Suwon Hyundai Engineering & Construction Hillstate, marking a new chapter in her international career after her previous two-season success with the Red Sparks.

== Club career ==
Name of the Club	Years	League Career
(Indonesia) Jakarta Pertamina Energi	2015–2019	Runners-up (2), Third place (1)
(Indonesia) Jakarta BNI 46	2019–2020	
(Thailand) Supreme Chonburi.E Tech	2020–2021	Third place
(Vietnam) Hà Phú Thanh Hóa	2021–2022	
(Indonesia) Bandung BJB Tandamata	2021–2022	
(Indonesia) Jakarta Pertamina Fastron	2022–2023	Runners-up
(South Korea) Daejeon Red Sparks	2023–2024	Third place
(Indonesia) Jakarta BIN	2023–2024	Champion
(South Korea) Daejeon Red Sparks	2024–2025	Runners-up
Gresik Petrokimia Pupuk Indonesia	2024–2025	Third place
(Indonesia) Jakarta Pertamina Enduro	2025–2026	Champion
(South Korea) Suwon Hyundai E&C Hillstate	2026–	

== Awards ==
=== Individuals ===
- 2019 ASEAN Grand Prix - "Best server"
- 2020 Summer Olympics - Asian qualification - "Best scorer"
- 2022 Indonesian Proliga - "Best server"
- 2022 ASEAN Grand Prix - "Best opposite spiker"
- 2023 Asian Challenge Cup - "Best opposite spiker"
- 2023–24 Korean V-League - "MVP of the first round"
- 2024 Indonesian Proliga - "MVP"
- 2024-25 Korean V-League - "MVP of the third round"
- 2024-25 Korean V-League - "MVP of the fourth round"
- 2026 Indonesian Proliga - "Best opposite spiker"
- 2026 Indonesian Proliga - "MVP"

=== Clubs ===
- 2015 Indonesian Proliga - 3rd place, with Jakarta Pertamina Energi
- 2016 Indonesian Proliga - Runner-up, with Jakarta Pertamina Energi
- 2019 Indonesian Proliga - Runner-up, with Jakarta Pertamina Energi
- 2020–21 Thailand League - 3rd place, with Supreme Chonburi.E Tech
- 2023 Indonesian Proliga - Runner-up, with Jakarta Pertamina Fastron
- 2023–24 Korean V-League - 3rd place, with Daejeon Red Sparks
- 2024 Indonesian Proliga - Champion, with Jakarta BIN
- 2024–25 KOVO Cup - Runner-up, with Daejeon Red Sparks
- 2024-25 Korean V-League - 2nd place, with Daejeon Red Sparks
- 2025 Indonesian Proliga - 3rd place, with Gresik Petrokimia
- 2026 Indonesian Proliga - Champion, with Jakarta Pertamina Enduro
