= Yolla Yuliana =

Indonesian volleyball player

Personal information
- Full name: Yolla Yuliana
- Nationality: Indonesian
- Born: 16 May 1994 (age 32) Bandung, West Java, Indonesia
- Height: 180 cm (5 ft 11 in)

Volleyball information
- Position: Outside Hitter
- Current club: Jakarta Pertamina Fastron
- Number: 15

Career
- Years: Team
- 2009: Bogor Prayoga Unitas
- 2010–2016: Jakarta Elektrik PLN
- 2017–2019: Jakarta BNI 46
- 2019–2022: Bandung BJB Tandamata
- 2022: Gresik Petrokimia Pupuk Indonesia
- 2023: Jakarta Pertamina Fastron
- 2024: Tokyo Sunbeams
- 2025: Jakarta Popsivo Polwan

National team
- Years: Team
- 2015–2025: Indonesia
Honours
Women's volleyball
Representing Indonesia
Asian Nations Cup
| Silver medal – second place | 2023 Gresik | Team |
- Updated on 7 February 2023

Yolla Yuliana (born May 16, 1994) is an Indonesian professional volleyball player. Currently she plays for Jakarta Pertamina Fastron.

== Early life ==
Yolla was born in Bandung, West Java, on 16 May 1994. Yolla's mother, Mira Mutiara, taught volleyball to Yolla. She started her volleyball career at 12 by joining Alko Bandung.

== Career ==
In 2009, she joined Bogor Prayoga Unitas. Due to her superb performance at Bogor Prayoga Unitas, she was recruited to Jakarta Elektrik PLN in 2010. In 2017, she moved to Jakarta BNI 46 and played for that club for two years. She then played for Bandung BJB Tandamata from 2019 - 2022.

She has also played for the Indonesia national team. Indonesia finished as runners-up at the 2023 AVC Women's Challenge Cup. She last played at the 2025 AVC Women's Volleyball Nations Cup.

== Personal life ==
Yolla studied at Bandung Raya University and STIA Bagasasi Bandung. In 2017, she married badminton athlete Kaesar Akbar. Yolla and Kaesar have one son. However, they divorced in 2020.

== Honours ==
- Proliga
  - Jakarta Elektrik PLN
    - 1st place: 2014
  - Bandung BJB Tandamata
    - 1st place: 2022
  - Jakarta BNI 46
    - 3rd place: 2018
