= 2019 ASEAN Grand Prix – First Leg squads =

These are the official line ups for the 2019 ASEAN Grand Prix.

== First leg ==
=== Indonesia ===
The following is the Indonesian roster in the 2019 ASEAN Grand Prix - First Leg.

Head Coach: Oktavian

No.	Name	Date of birth	Height	Weight	Spike	Block	Club
1	Yulis Indahyani	3 February 1990	1.67 m (5 ft 6 in)	63 kg (139 lb)	270 cm (110 in)	260 cm (100 in)	(Indonesia) Jakarta Pertamina Energi
2	Ratri Wulandari	8 May 2002	1.78 m (5 ft 10 in)	—N/a	—N/a	—N/a	(Indonesia) Bandung BJB Pakuan
3	Megawati Hangestri Pertiwi	20 September 1999	1.85 m (6 ft 1 in)	65 kg (143 lb)	278 cm (109 in)	270 cm (110 in)	(Indonesia) Jakarta Pertamina Energi
5	Wintang Dyah Kumala Sari	1 October 1998	1.72 m (5 ft 8 in)	59 kg (130 lb)	—N/a	—N/a	(Indonesia) Bandung BJB Pakuan
7	Amalia Fajrina Nabila	26 April 1994	1.75 m (5 ft 9 in)	63 kg (139 lb)	278 cm (109 in)	265 cm (104 in)	(Indonesia) Jakarta Popsivo Polwan
8	Tisya Amallya Putri	11 October 2000	1.67 m (5 ft 6 in)	69 kg (152 lb)	—N/a	—N/a	(Indonesia) Bandung BJB Pakuan
10	Agustin Wulandhari	12 August 1991	1.82 m (6 ft 0 in)	71 kg (157 lb)	—N/a	—N/a	(Indonesia) Jakarta Pertamina Energi
11	Shella Bernadetha Onnan	31 October 1999	1.78 m (5 ft 10 in)	60 kg (130 lb)	—N/a	—N/a	(Indonesia) Bandung BJB Pakuan
12	Arsela Nuari Purnama	21 January 1997	1.77 m (5 ft 10 in)	64 kg (141 lb)	277 cm (109 in)	265 cm (104 in)	(Indonesia) Jakarta Popsivo Polwan
13	Tri Retno Mutiara Lutfi	16 November 1997	1.75 m (5 ft 9 in)	62 kg (137 lb)	275 cm (108 in)	250 cm (98 in)	(Indonesia) Jakarta BNI 46
15	Hany Budiarti	20 August 1996	1.76 m (5 ft 9 in)	62 kg (137 lb)	270 cm (110 in)	265 cm (104 in)	(Indonesia) Jakarta BNI 46
16	Dita Azizah	23 December 2000	1.60 m (5 ft 3 in)	53 kg (117 lb)	270 cm (110 in)	260 cm (100 in)	
17	Wilda Nurfadhilah	7 February 1995	1.78 m (5 ft 10 in)	65 kg (143 lb)	275 cm (108 in)	250 cm (98 in)	(Indonesia) Jakarta Popsivo Polwan

=== Philippines ===
The following is the Filipino roster in the 2019 ASEAN Grand Prix - First Leg.

Head Coach: Shaq Delos Santos

No.	Name	Date of birth	Height	Weight	Spike	Block	Club
1	Kalei Mau	5 October 1995	1.86 m (6 ft 1 in)	62 kg (137 lb)	298 cm (9 ft 9 in)	290 cm (9 ft 6 in)	(Philippines) F2 Logistics Cargo Movers
4	Kath Arado	22 May 1998	1.65 m (5 ft 5 in)	55 kg (121 lb)	254 cm (8 ft 4 in)	252 cm (8 ft 3 in)	(Philippines) Generika-Ayala Lifesavers
5	Dawn Macandili	31 May 1996	1.53 m (5 ft 0 in)	50 kg (110 lb)	246 cm (8 ft 1 in)	234 cm (7 ft 8 in)	(Philippines) F2 Logistics Cargo Movers
6	Frances Molina	24 September 1994	1.80 m (5 ft 11 in)	61 kg (134 lb)	280 cm (110 in)	275 cm (108 in)	(Philippines) Petron Blaze Spikers
7	Mylene Paat	5 April 1994	1.80 m (5 ft 11 in)	66 kg (146 lb)	285 cm (9 ft 4 in)	274 cm (9 ft 0 in)	(Philippines) Cignal HD Spikers
8	Aiza Maizo-Pontillas	29 February 1988	1.78 m (5 ft 10 in)	68 kg (150 lb)	280 cm (9 ft 2 in)	275 cm (9 ft 0 in)	(Philippines) Petron Blaze Spikers
9	Ejiya Laure	20 March 1999	1.79 m (5 ft 10 in)	70 kg (150 lb)	288 cm (9 ft 5 in)	285 cm (9 ft 4 in)	(Philippines) Foton Tornadoes
10	Majoy Baron	10 December 1995	1.81 m (5 ft 11 1/2 in)	59 kg (130 lb)	287 cm (9 ft 5 in)	272 cm (8 ft 11 in)	(Philippines) F2 Logistics Cargo Movers
11	Roselyn Doria	2 September 1996	1.78 m (5 ft 10 in)	60 kg (130 lb)	280 cm (9 ft 2 in)	275 cm (9 ft 0 in)	(Philippines) Cignal HD Spikers
12	Jia Morado	10 May 1995	1.68 m (5 ft 6 in)	54 kg (119 lb)	278 cm (9 ft 1 in)	272 cm (8 ft 11 in)	(Philippines) Creamline Cool Smashers
13	Alohi Robins-Hardy	30 November 1995	1.90 m (6 ft 3 in)	80 kg (180 lb)	300 cm (9 ft 10 in)	295 cm (9 ft 8 in)	(Philippines) Cignal HD Spikers
15	Jovelyn Gonzaga	31 October 1991	1.72 m (5 ft 7 1/2 in)	61 kg (134 lb)	273 cm (107 in)	274 cm (108 in)	(Philippines) Cignal HD Spikers
17	Maddie Madayag	2 July 1998	1.80 m (5 ft 11 in)	60 kg (130 lb)	288 cm (9 ft 5 in)	282 cm (9 ft 3 in)	(Philippines) Choco Mucho Flying Titans
18	Abigail Maraño (C)	22 December 1992	1.75 m (5 ft 9 in)	54 kg (119 lb)	280 cm (9 ft 2 in)	280 cm (9 ft 2 in)	(Philippines) F2 Logistics Cargo Movers

=== Thailand ===
The following is the Thai roster in the 2019 ASEAN Grand Prix - First Leg.

Head Coach: Danai Sriwatcharamethakul

No.	Name	Date of birth	Height	Weight	Spike	Block	Club
2	Piyanut Pannoy	10 November 1989	1.71 m (5 ft 7 in)	68 kg (150 lb)	280 cm (9 ft 2 in)	275 cm (9 ft 0 in)	(Thailand) Generali Supreme Chonburi
3	Pornpun Guedpard	5 May 1993	1.70 m (5 ft 7 in)	65 kg (143 lb)	288 cm (9 ft 5 in)	279 cm (9 ft 2 in)	(Thailand) Khonkaen Star
4	Thatdao Nuekjang	3 February 1994	1.84 m (6 ft 0 in)	74 kg (163 lb)	308 cm (10 ft 1 in)	296 cm (9 ft 9 in)	(Thailand) Khonkaen Star
5	Pleumjit Thinkaow	9 November 1983	1.80 m (5 ft 11 in)	67 kg (148 lb)	303 cm (9 ft 11 in)	283 cm (9 ft 3 in)	(Thailand) Generali Supreme Chonburi
6	Onuma Sittirak	13 June 1986	1.75 m (5 ft 9 in)	72 kg (159 lb)	304 cm (10 ft 0 in)	285 cm (9 ft 4 in)	(Thailand) Diamond Food
8	Watchareeya Nuanjam	22 July 1996	1.77 m (5 ft 10 in)	64 kg (141 lb)	292 cm (9 ft 7 in)	279 cm (9 ft 2 in)	(Thailand) Generali Supreme Chonburi
9	Wanitchaya Luangtonglang	8 October 1992	1.77 m (5 ft 10 in)	60 kg (130 lb)	300 cm (9 ft 10 in)	275 cm (9 ft 0 in)	(Thailand) Nakhonratchasima The Mall
10	Wilavan Apinyapong	6 June 1984	1.74 m (5 ft 9 in)	70 kg (150 lb)	294 cm (9 ft 8 in)	282 cm (9 ft 3 in)	(Thailand) Generali Supreme Chonburi
15	Malika Kanthong	8 January 1987	1.78 m (5 ft 10 in)	69 kg (152 lb)	292 cm (9 ft 7 in)	278 cm (9 ft 1 in)	(Thailand) Diamond Food
16	Pimpichaya Kokram	16 June 1998	1.78 m (5 ft 10 in)	62 kg (137 lb)	293 cm (9 ft 7 in)	283 cm (9 ft 3 in)	(Thailand) 3BB Nakornnont
19	Chatchu-on Moksri	6 November 1999	1.78 m (5 ft 10 in)	58 kg (128 lb)	298 cm (9 ft 9 in)	290 cm (9 ft 6 in)	(Thailand) Nakhonratchasima The Mall
21	Kullapa Piampongsan	17 March 1991	1.78 m (5 ft 10 in)	60 kg (130 lb)	280 cm (9 ft 2 in)	274 cm (9 ft 0 in)	(Thailand) Diamond Food
24	Tichakorn Boonlert	22 March 2001	1.80 m (5 ft 11 in)	78 kg (172 lb)	294 cm (9 ft 8 in)	283 cm (9 ft 3 in)	(Thailand) 3BB Nakornnont
25	Tikamporn Changkeaw	12 December 1984	1.68 m (5 ft 6 in)	62 kg (137 lb)	260 cm (8 ft 6 in)	252 cm (8 ft 3 in)	(Thailand) Nakhonratchasima The Mall

=== Vietnam ===
The following 14 players of Vietnam in the 2019 ASEAN Grand Prix - First Leg.

Head Coach: Nguyễn Tuấn Kiệt

No.	Name	Date of Birth	Height	Weight	Spike	Block	2019 Club
2	Đặng Thị Kim Thanh	28 March 1998	1.78 m (5 ft 10 in)	62 kg (137 lb)	298 cm (117 in)	292 cm (115 in)	(Vietnam) VTV Bình Điền Long An
3	Trần Thị Thanh Thúy	12 November 1997	1.93 m (6 ft 4 in)	67 kg (148 lb)	320 cm (130 in)	310 cm (120 in)	(Vietnam) VTV Bình Điền Long An
6	Lê Thị Yến	15 September 1997	1.69 m (5 ft 7 in)	62 kg (137 lb)	286 cm (113 in)	280 cm (110 in)	(Vietnam) Kingphar Quảng Ninh
7	Hoàng Thị Kiều Trinh	11 February 2001	1.76 m (5 ft 9 in)	60 kg (130 lb)	298 cm (117 in)	288 cm (113 in)	(Vietnam) Thông tin LVPB
8	Nguyễn Thị Kim Liên	10 February 1993	1.58 m (5 ft 2 in)	53 kg (117 lb)	280 cm (110 in)	275 cm (108 in)	(Vietnam) VTV Bình Điền Long An
9	Trần Thị Bích Thủy	12 November 2000	1.83 m (6 ft 0 in)	67 kg (148 lb)	300 cm (120 in)	288 cm (113 in)	(Thailand) Quint Air Force
11	Lê Thị Hồng	20 December 1996	1.78 m (5 ft 10 in)	62 kg (137 lb)	295 cm (116 in)	286 cm (113 in)	(Vietnam) Kingphar Quảng Ninh
12	Nguyễn Thị Ninh Anh	4 September 2000	1.74 m (5 ft 9 in)	65 kg (143 lb)	295 cm (116 in)	292 cm (115 in)	(Vietnam) Vietinbank VC
15	Nguyễn Thị Trinh	5 September 1997	1.81 m (5 ft 11 in)	62 kg (137 lb)	298 cm (117 in)	290 cm (110 in)	(Vietnam) Đắk Lắk VC
16	Bùi Thị Ngà	15 August 1994	1.87 m (6 ft 2 in)	74 kg (163 lb)	307 cm (121 in)	305 cm (120 in)	(Vietnam) Thông Tin LVPB
17	Trần Tú Linh	7 October 1999	1.80 m (5 ft 11 in)	63 kg (139 lb)	298 cm (117 in)	290 cm (110 in)	(Vietnam) Vietinbank VC
18	Lưu Thị Huệ	2 January 1999	1.85 m (6 ft 1 in)	59 kg (130 lb)	292 cm (115 in)	286 cm (113 in)	(Vietnam) Vietinbank VC
19	Đoàn Thị Lâm Oanh	6 July 1998	1.77 m (5 ft 10 in)	68 kg (150 lb)	298 cm (117 in)	292 cm (115 in)	(Vietnam) Thông tin LVPB
20	Nguyễn Thu Hoài	16 August 1998	1.73 m (5 ft 8 in)	64 kg (141 lb)	293 cm (115 in)	290 cm (110 in)	(Vietnam) Vietinbank VC
