= 2023 SEA Women's V.League – First Leg =

Southeast Asian volleyball tournament

Tournament details
- Host country: Vietnam
- City: Vĩnh Phúc
- Dates: 4–6 August
- Teams: 4 (from 1 confederation)
- Venue: 1 (in 1 host city)

Final positions
- Champions: Thailand (4th title)
- Runners-up: Vietnam
- Third place: Indonesia
- Fourth place: Philippines

Tournament awards
- MVP: (Thailand) Ajcharaporn Kongyot
- Best Setter: (Vietnam) Đoàn Thị Lâm Oanh
- Best OH: (Vietnam) Trần Thị Thanh Thúy; (Thailand) Ajcharaporn Kongyot
- Best MB: (Indonesia) Wilda Nurfadhilah; (Thailand) Thatdao Nuekjang
- Best OPP: (Vietnam) Hoàng Thị Kiều Trinh
- Best Libero: (Thailand) Piyanut Pannoy

Tournament statistics
- Matches played: 6
- Attendance: 15,600 (2,600 per match)

The 2023 SEA Women's V.League – First Leg was contested by four national teams that are the members of the Southeast Asian Volleyball Association (SEAVA), the sport's regional governing body affiliated to Asian Volleyball Confederation (AVC). Games were played at Vĩnh Phúc, Vietnam from 4 to 6 August 2023.

== Teams ==
- Indonesia
- Philippines
- Thailand
- Vietnam

== Venue ==
All matches
Vĩnh Phúc, Vietnam
Vĩnh Phúc Gymnasium
Capacity: 3,000

== Pool standing procedure ==
1. Total number of victories (matches won, matches lost)
2. In the event of a tie, the following first tiebreaker was to apply: The teams was to be ranked by the most point gained per match as follows:
  - Match won 3–0 or 3–1: 3 points for the winner, 0 points for the loser
  - Match won 3–2: 2 points for the winner, 1 point for the loser
  - Match forfeited: 3 points for the winner, 0 points (0–25, 0–25, 0–25) for the loser

== League results ==
- All times are Indochina Time (UTC+07:00).

Pos	Team	Pld	W	L	Pts	SW	SL	SR	SPW	SPL	SPR
1	Thailand	3	3	0	9	9	1	9.000	252	199	1.266
2	Vietnam (H)	3	2	1	6	7	5	1.400	280	250	1.120
3	Indonesia	3	1	2	3	4	6	0.667	223	233	0.957
4	Philippines	3	0	3	0	1	9	0.111	171	244	0.701

Source: Daily Bulletin #4
(H) Host

Date	Time		Score		Set 1	Set 2	Set 3	Set 4	Set 5	Total	Report
4 Aug	16:00	Indonesia	0–3	Thailand	24–26	24–26	20–25			68–77	Report
4 Aug	19:00	Vietnam	3–1	Philippines	25–15	19–25	25–21	25–9		94–70	Report
5 Aug	16:00	Thailand	3–0	Philippines	25–19	25–7	25–17			75–43	Report
5 Aug	19:00	Indonesia	1–3	Vietnam	20–25	17–25	25–23	18–25		80–98	Report
6 Aug	16:00	Philippines	0–3	Indonesia	20–25	17–25	21–25			58–75	Report
6 Aug	19:00	Thailand	3–1	Vietnam	22–25	25–20	28–26	25–17		100–88	Report

== Final standing ==
Rank	Team
1st place, gold medalist(s)	Thailand
2nd place, silver medalist(s)	Vietnam
3rd place, bronze medalist(s)	Indonesia
4	Philippines

2023 SEA V.League – First Leg champions

Thailand
4th title

14–woman roster
Wipawee Srithong, Piyanut Pannoy, Pornpun Guedpard, Thatdao Nuekjang, Pimpichaya Kokram, Sasipapron Janthawisut, Ajcharaporn Kongyot, Chatchu-on Moksri, Thanacha Sooksod, Sirima Manakij, Tichakorn Boonlert, Wimonrat Thanapan, Jidapa Nahuanong, Jarasporn Bundasak
Head coach
Danai Sriwatcharamethakul

== Awards ==
- Most valuable player
  Ajcharaporn Kongyot (THA)
- Best setter
  Đoàn Thị Lâm Oanh (VIE)
- Best outside spikers
  Trần Thị Thanh Thúy (VIE)
  Ajcharaporn Kongyot (THA)
- Best middle blockers
  Wilda Nurfadhilah (INA)
  Thatdao Nuekjang (THA)
- Best opposite spiker
  Hoàng Thị Kiều Trinh (VIE)
- Best libero
  Piyanut Pannoy (THA)

== See also ==
- 2023 SEA Men's V.League – First Leg
