= Amporn Hyapha =

Thai volleyball player (born 1985)

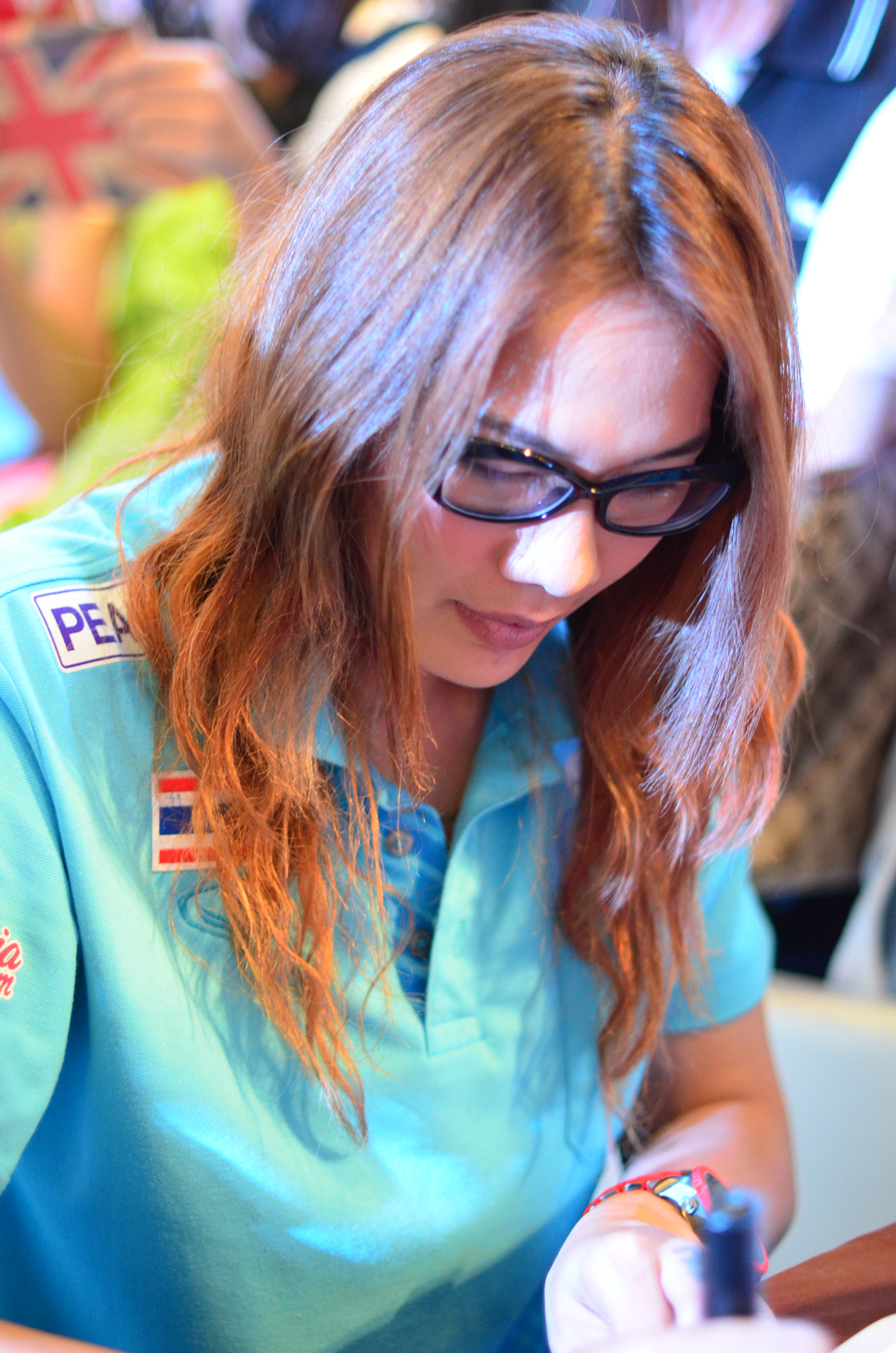

Personal information
- Full name: Amporn Hyapha
- Nickname: Jackie
- Nationality: Thai
- Born: May 19, 1985 (age 41) Nakhon Sawan, Thailand
- Height: 1.80 m (5 ft 11 in)
- Weight: 70 kg (154 lb)
- Spike: 301 cm (119 in)
- Block: 290 cm (114 in)

Volleyball information
- Position: Middle Blocker
- Current club: (Thailand) Diamond Food
- Number: 21

National team
- Years: Team
- 2001–2014, 2019–2021: Thailand
Honours
Women's volleyball
Representing Thailand
Summer Universiade
Bronze medal – third place	2013 Kazan	Team
Asian Championship
Gold medal – first place	2009 Hanoi	Team
Gold medal – first place	2013 Nakhon Ratchasima	Team
Bronze medal – third place	2001 Nakhon Ratchasima	Team
Bronze medal – third place	2007 Nakhon Ratchasima	Team
Asian Cup
Gold medal – first place	2012 Almaty	Team
Silver medal – second place	2010 Taicang	Team
Bronze medal – third place	2008 Nakhon Ratchasima	Team
Southeast Asian Games
Gold medal – first place	2001 Kuala Lumpur	Team
Gold medal – first place	2003 Hanoi	Team
Gold medal – first place	2005 Manila	Team
Gold medal – first place	2007 Nakhon Ratchasima	Team
Gold medal – first place	2009 Vientiane	Team
Gold medal – first place	2011 Jakarta/Palembang	Team
Gold medal – first place	2013 Naypyidaw	Team

Amporn Hyapha (Thai: อำพร หญ้าผา, RTGS: Amphon Yapha, pronounced [ʔām.pʰɔ̄ːn jâː.pʰǎː]; born 19 May 1985) is a member of the Thailand women's national volleyball team.

== Career ==
Hyapha played with Bangkok Glass in 2017–18 Thailand League (Second leg).

She is on the list 2019 Korea-Thailand all star super match competition.

She played in 2019 Asian Women's Club Volleyball Championship with Supreme Chonburi on loan.

== Personal life ==
Amporn Hyapha married Somporn Wannaprapa in 2014.

== Clubs ==
- (Thailand) Sang Som (2005–2006)
- (Thailand) Phuket (2006)
- (Thailand) Federbrau (2008–2009)
- (Turkey) Ereğli Belediye (2009–2010)
- (Indonesia) Jakarta Electric PLN (2010–2012)
- (Thailand) Sisaket (2010–2011)
- (Vietnam) VTV Bình Điền Long An (2011)
- (Thailand) Nonthaburi (2011–2012)
- (Azerbaijan) Igtisadchi Baku (2012–2013)
- (Indonesia) Jakarta Pertamina (2013–2014)
- (Thailand) Nonthaburi (2013–2014)
- (Philippines) Cagayan Valley (2014)
- (Thailand) Nonthaburi (2015–2016)
- (Thailand) Nakhon Ratchasima (2016–2017)
- (Philippines) Power Smashers (2017)
- (Thailand) Bangkok Glass (2018)
- (Philippines) Tacloban Fighting Warays (2018)
- (Thailand) Nakhon Ratchasima (2018–2019)
- (Thailand) Diamond Food (2019–)

== Awards ==
=== Individuals ===
- 2005 Asian Club Championship – "Best Server"
- 2005 Asian Championship – "Best Server"
- 2006 Thailand League – "Best Scorer"
- 2006 Thailand League "Best Server"
- 2010 Asian Games – "Best Server"

=== Clubs ===
- 2009 Indonesia Proliga – Champion, with Jakarta Electric PLN
- 2010 Indonesia Proliga – Runner-up, with Jakarta Electric PLN
- 2011 Indonesia Proliga – Champion, with Jakarta Electric PLN
- 2012–13 Azerbaijan Super League – Runner-up, with Igtisadchi Baku
- 2014 Shakey's V-league – Champion, with Cagayan Valley
- 2018–19 Thailand League – Champion, with Nakhon Ratchasima
- 2009 Asian Club Championship – Champion, with Federbrau
- 2010 Asian Club Championship – Champion, with Federbrau
- 2011 Asian Club Championship – Champion, with Chang
- 2012 Asian Club Championship – Bronze medal, with Chang
- 2019 Asian Club Championship – Runner-up, with Supreme Chonburi

== Royal decorations ==
- 2013 – Commander (Third Class) of The Most Exalted Order of the White Elephant
- 2010 – Commander (Third Class) of The Most Admirable Order of the Direkgunabhorn
- 2005 – Member (Fifth Class) of The Most Admirable Order of the Direkgunabhorn
