= Aprilio Manganang =

Indonesian volleyball player

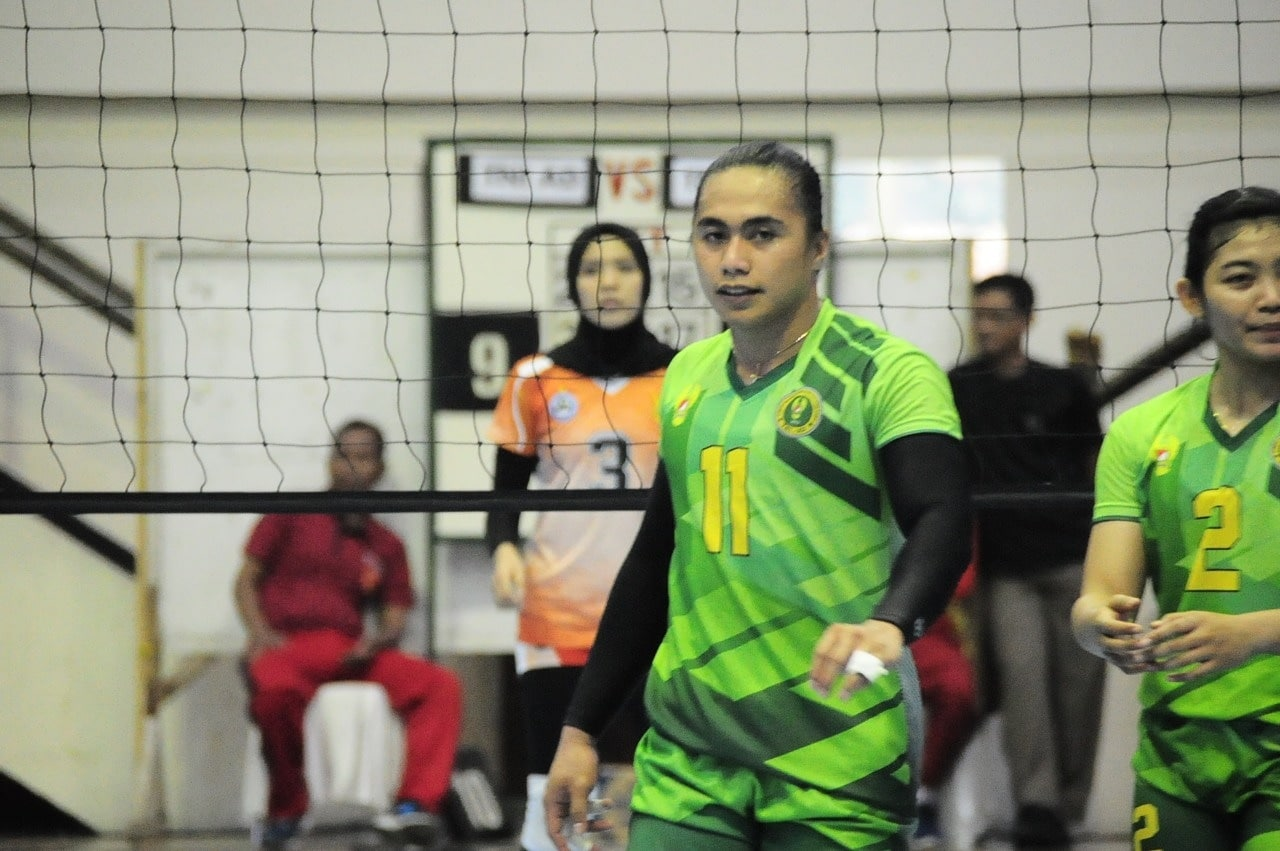
- Manganang in 2018

Personal information
- Full name: Aprilio Perkasa Manganang
- Nationality: Indonesian
- Born: Aprilia Santini Manganang; 27 April 1992 (age 34)
- Hometown: Tahuna, North Sulawesi, Indonesia
- Height: 170 cm (5 ft 7 in)
- Weight: 76 kg (168 lb)

Volleyball information
- Position: Outside hitter

Career
Years	Teams
2011–2012	Alko Indramayu
2012–2013	Jakarta BNI Taplus
2013–2014	Manokwari Valeria Papua Barat
2014–2017	Jakarta Elektrik PLN
2017–2020	Bandung BJB Pakuan
2018–2019	Supreme VC
2018–2019	Jakarta PGN Popsivo

Aprilio Perkasa Manganang (born Aprilia Santini Manganang; 27 April 1992) is an Indonesian volleyball player who competed as a woman but was later determined to be an intersex male post-retirement. He was a member of Indonesia women's national team. He played in 2019 Women's Volleyball Thai-Denmark Super League for the Supreme Volleyball Club as an import player.

== Early life ==
Manganang was born in Tahuna, North Sulawesi in Indonesia. He was born with hypospadias, but due to the lack of medical facilities in his hometown he would only be aware of this condition later in life after his volleyball career. He was assigned as female at birth and was raised as a girl. Manganang reportedly felt different than girls of his age.

== Career ==
=== Club ===
Manganang played in multiple local club teams in Indonesia and received various tournament awards. With his vertical leap and powerful attacks, he received awards in the Vietnam-based tournament named VTV International Women's Volleyball Cup. He played as an import in Thailand for the Supreme Volleyball Club and won the championship and Most Valuable Player award.

Playing as a woman throughout his career and oblivious to his own condition, clubs have refused to play against him in the Livoli in Indonesia at least twice; one was in 2011 when he was still playing with Alko Indramayu.

=== National team ===
Manganang represented Indonesia in international volleyball tournaments including the Southeast Asian Games and the 2018 Asian Games. At the 2015 Southeast Asian Games, the Philippine national team filed a protest which disputed Manganang's eligibility and demanded he undergo a sex verification test but was cleared by the FIVB.

== Post-retirement ==
Manganang announced his retirement from volleyball in September 2020 at age 28. He then entered the Indonesian Army after retiring. It was in February 2021, that he learned of his biological sex and his hypospadias condition. He underwent corrective surgery and had his legal gender changed from female to male, and change his name from "Aprilia Santini" to "Aprilio Perkasa". The Indonesian Volleyball Federation also agreed to not strip the women's volleyball titles won by Manganang saying that he has no fault.

He married his wife, Claudya Clara who is also from North Sulawesi in December 2022.

== Clubs ==
- (Indonesia) Alko Indramayu (2011–2012)
- (Indonesia) Jakarta BNI Taplus (2012–2013)
- (Indonesia) Manokwari Valeria Papua Barat (2013–2014)
- (Indonesia) Jakarta Elektrik PLN (2014–2017)
- (Indonesia) Jakarta PGN Popsivo (2018–2019)
- (Thailand) Generali Supreme Chonburi-E.Tech (2019-loan)
- (Indonesia) Bandung BJB Pakuan (2019–2020)

== Awards ==
=== Individual ===
- 2014–2015 Indonesian Women's Proliga "Best scorer"
- 2014–2015 Indonesian Women's Proliga "Best opposite hitter"
- 2015–2016 Indonesian Women's Proliga "Best opposite hitter"
- 2016 VTV International Women's Volleyball Cup "Most valuable player"
- 2016–2017 Indonesian Women's Proliga "Best scorer"
- 2016–2017 Indonesian Women's Proliga "Most valuable player"
- 2017 VTV International Women's Volleyball Cup "Best outside hitter"
- 2018–2019 Indonesian Women's Proliga "Most valuable player"
- 2019 Women's Volleyball Thai-Denmark Super League "Most valuable player"
