= Wilda Nurfadhilah =

Indonesian volleyball player

Personal information
- Full name: Wilda Siti Nurfadhilah Sugandi
- Nationality: Indonesian
- Born: February 7, 1995 (age 31) Bandung, West Java, Indonesia
- Height: 178 cm (5 ft 10 in)
- Weight: 65 kg (143 lb)
- Spike: 275 cm (108 in)
- Block: 250 cm (98 in)

Volleyball information
- Position: Middle Blocker
- Current club: Jakarta BIN
- Number: 17

Career
- Years: Team
- 2010–2011: (Indonesia) Alko Bandung
- 2013–2014: (Indonesia) Manokwari Valeria Papua Barat
- 2015–2017: (Indonesia) Jakarta Elektrik PLN
- 2018: (Indonesia) Bandung Bank BJB Pakuan
- 2019: (Indonesia) Jakarta PGN Popsivo Polwan
- 2020: (Indonesia) Jakarta Pertamina Energi
- 2022–2023: (Indonesia) Bandung BJB Tandamata
- 2024: (Indonesia) Jakarta BIN

National team
- Years: Team
- 2011–2024: Indonesia
Honours
Women's volleyball
Representing Indonesia
Asian Challenge Cup
| Silver medal – second place | 2023 Gresik | Team |
Southeast Asian Games
| Silver medal – second place | 2017 Kuala Lumpur | Team |
| Bronze medal – third place | 2011 Palembang | Team |
| Bronze medal – third place | 2013 Naypyidaw | Team |
| Bronze medal – third place | 2015 Singapore | Team |
| Bronze medal – third place | 2019 Pasig | Team |
| Bronze medal – third place | 2021 Quảng Ninh | Team |
| Bronze medal – third place | 2023 Phnom Penh | Team |
VTV Cup
| Silver medal – second place | 2017 Hải Dương | Team |
ASEAN Grand Prix
| Silver medal – second place | 2019 Nakhon Ratchasima | Team |
| Bronze medal – third place | 2022 Nakhon Ratchasima | Team |
| Bronze medal – third place | 2023 Vĩnh Phúc | Team |
| Bronze medal – third place | 2023 Chiang Mai | Team |

Wilda Siti Nurfadhilah Sugandi (born February 7, 1995) is an Indonesian volleyball player. Currently, plays for Jakarta BIN and is a member of the Indonesia women's national volleyball team.

== Career ==
Wilda first joined the senior national team in the 2011 Asian Volleyball Championship where the Indonesian team finished in 13th place. During her participation with the national team in the Southeast Asian Games she has won 1 silver medal and 5 bronze medals. In 2018, she participated in Asian Games which was held in Indonesia and finished in 7th place.

== Early life and education ==
Wilda was born on February 7, 1995, in Bandung, West Java, Indonesia. She is the second child of Ugan Sugandi and Wiwi Lestiani. She younger brother, Achmad Rizal Nurhuda is also a volleyball player who currently plays for the club Jakarta BNI 46. Wilda graduated from Bandung Raya University with a degree in economics and graduated from STKIP Pasundan with a master's degree in education.

== Awards ==
=== Individual ===
- 2015 Indonesian Proliga – "Best Blocker"
- 2016 Indonesian Proliga – "Best Blocker"
- 2017 VTV Cup Championship – "Best Middle Blockers"
- 2019 Indonesian Proliga – "Best Spiker"
- 2022 Indonesian Proliga – "Best Blocker"
- 2023 Asian Challenge Cup – "Best middle blocker"
- 2023 SEA V.League – First Leg – "Best middle blocker"

=== Club ===
- 2013 Indonesian Proliga – Runner-up, with Manokwari Valeria Papua Barat
- 2014 Indonesian Proliga – Runner-up, with Manokwari Valeria Papua Barat
- 2015 Indonesian Proliga – Champion, with Jakarta Electric PLN
- 2016 Indonesian Proliga – Champion, with Jakarta Elektrik PLN
- 2017 Indonesian Proliga – Champion, with Jakarta Elektrik PLN
- 2018 Indonesian Proliga – Runner-up, with Bandung Bank BJB Pakuan
- 2019 Indonesian Proliga – Champion, with Jakarta PGN Popsivo Polwan
- 2022 Indonesian Proliga – Champion, with Bandung BJB Tandamata
- 2023 Indonesian Proliga – Champion, with Bandung BJB Tandamata
- 2024 Indonesian Proliga – Champion, with Jakarta BIN
