= Neriman Özsoy =

Turkish volleyball player (born 1988)

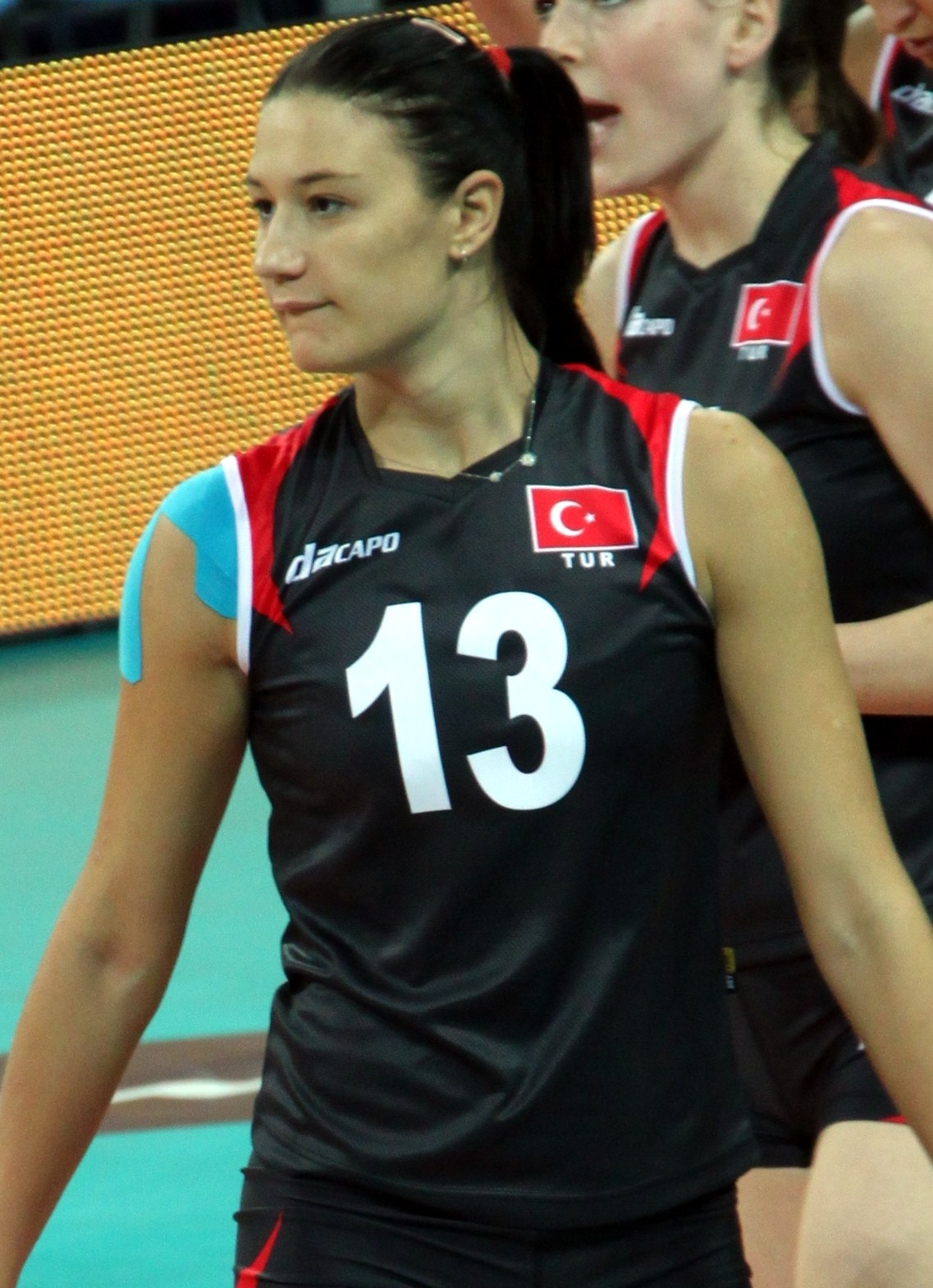

Personal information
- Nationality: Turkish/Bulgarian
- Born: 13 July 1988 (age 38); Razgrad, Bulgaria
- Height: 1.88 m (6 ft 2 in)
- Weight: 76 kg (168 lb)
- Spike: 311 cm (122 in)
- Block: 306 cm (120 in)

Volleyball information
- Position: Outside hitter
- Current club: Jakarta Electric PLN Mobile
- Number: 13

Career
Years	Teams
1999–2006; 2006; 2006–2007; 2007–2010; 2010–2012; 2010–2012; 2012; 2012–2014; 2014–2015; 2015–2016; 2016–2017; 2017–2020; 2020–2021; 2021–2022; 2022–2023; 2023–2024; 2025	Eczacıbaşı; VC Uralochka; DYO Karşıyaka; Eczacıbaşı; Despar Perugia → Atom Trefl Sopot (loan) → Dynamo Krasnodar (loan); Galatasaray Daikin; Imoco Volley Conegliano; Eczacıbaşı VitrA; Liu Jo Nordmeccanica; Toyota Auto Body Queenseis; NEC Red Rockets; Itambé/Minas; Denso Airybees; Türk Hava Yolları; Jakarta Popsivo Polwan; Jakarta Electric PLN Mobile

National team
2007–2017	Turkey
Honours
Women's volleyball
Representing Turkey
European Games
Gold medal – first place	2015 Baku	Team
European Championships
Bronze medal – third place	2011 Italy/Serbia
Bronze medal – third place	2017 Azerbaijan/Georgia

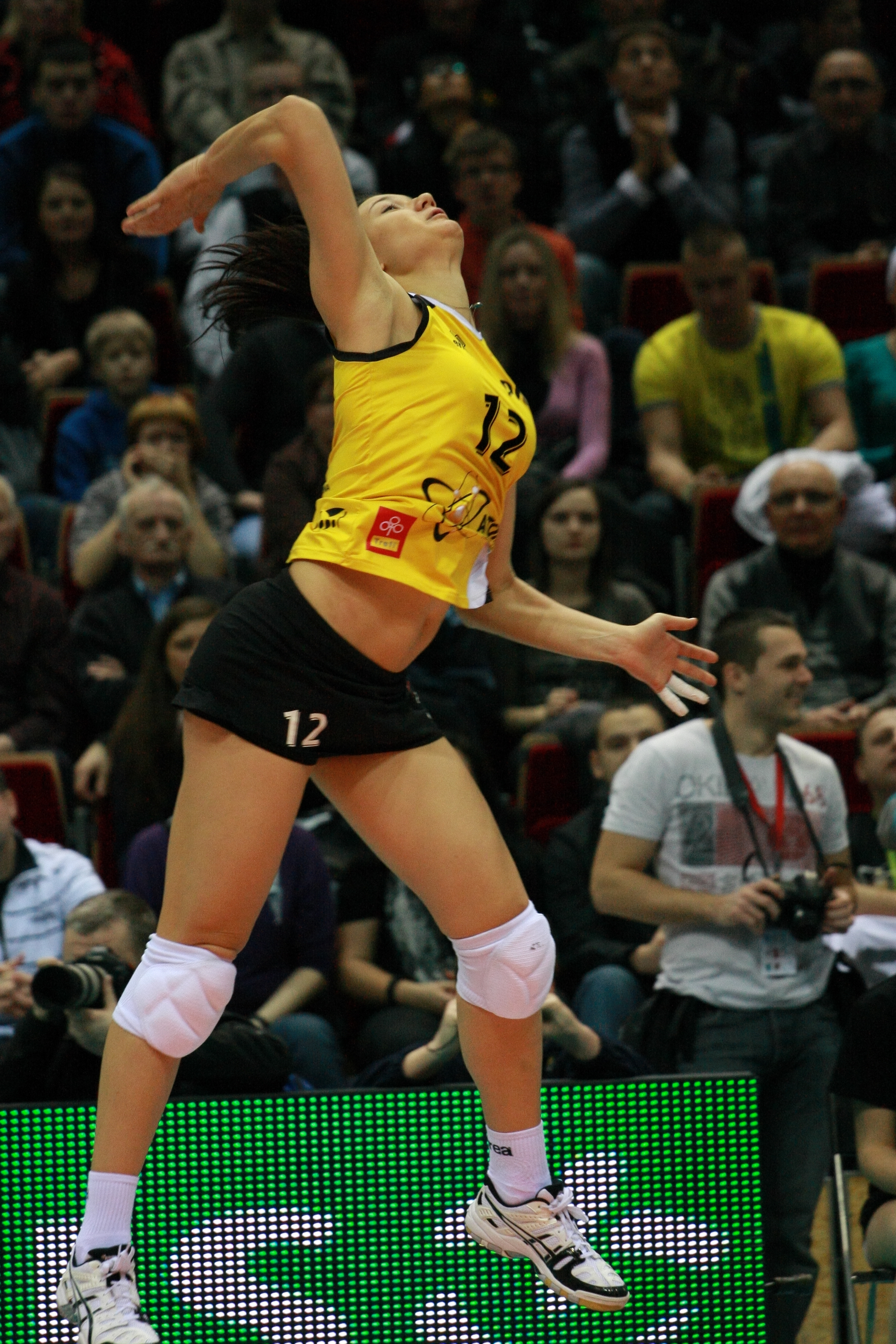
Neriman Özsoy playing for Atom Trefl Sopot.

Neriman Özsoy (born 13 July 1988 in Razgrad, Bulgaria) is a Turkish volleyball player. She is 188 cm (6.17 ft) tall 76 kg (168 lb) who recently last played as an outside hitter in Indonesia for Jakarta Electric PLN Mobile.

== Career ==
She started her career in Eczacıbaşı Zentiva, and after then she also played for DYO Karşıyaka and Galatasaray Daikin in Turkey, played for VC Uralochka and Dynamo Krasnodar in Russia, played for Despar Perugia and Imoco Volley Conegliano, Liu Jo Nordmeccanica in Italy, played for Atom Trefl Sopot in Poland, played for Toyota Auto Body Queenseis, NEC Red Rockets and Denso Airybees in Japan and played for Itambé/Minas in Brazil.

- 1999-06 (Turkey) Eczacıbaşı
- 2005-06 (Russia) VC Uralochka
- 2006-07 (Turkey) DYO Karşıyaka
- 2007-10 (Turkey) Eczacıbaşı
- 2010-12 (Italy) Despar Perugia
- 2010-12 → (Poland) Atom Trefl Sopot (loan)
- 2012 → (Russia) Dynamo Krasnodar (loan)
- 2012-14 (Turkey) Galatasaray Daikin
- 2014-15 (Italy) Imoco Volley Conegliano
- 2015-16 (Turkey) Eczacıbaşı VitrA
- 2016-17 (Italy) Liu Jo Nordmeccanica
- 2017-20 (Japan) Toyota Auto Body Queenseis
- 2020-21 (Japan) NEC Red Rockets
- 2021-22 (Brazil) Itambé/Minas
- 2022-23 (Japan) Denso Airybees
- 2023-24 (Turkey) Türk Hava Yolları

== Awards ==
=== National team ===
- European League (silver) 2011 (bronze) 2010
- European Championship (bronze) 2011, 2017
- FIVB World Grand Prix : (bronze) 2012
- European Games : (gold) 2015

=== Clubs ===
Eczacıbaşı

- FIVB Club World Championship: (gold) 2015
- CEV Cup: (bronze) 2004-05
- Turkish Volleyball League : (gold) 1999-00, 2000-01, 2001-02, 2002-03, 2007-08 (bronze) 2003-04, 2004-05, 2009-10, 2015-16
- Turkish Cup: (gold) 1999-00, 2000-01, 2001–02, 2002–03, 2008–09 (bronze) 2009–10
- Turkish Super Cup: (silver) 2009–10

DYO Karşıyaka

- Turkish Volleyball League : (bronze) 2006-07

Atom Trefl Sopot

- Polish Volleyball League – (gold) 2011-12 (silver) 2010-11
- Polish Cup: (silver) 2012

Galatasaray

- Turkish Cup: (bronze) 2012-13
- Turkish Super Cup: (bronze) 2012

Liu Jo Nordmeccanica

- Italian Volleyball League: (silver) 2016-17
- Coppa Italia: (silver) 2016-17

Toyota Auto Body Queenseis

- Emperor's Cup: (gold) 2017 (silver) 2018

Minas Tênis Clube

- South American Club Championship: (gold) 2022
- Brazilian Volleyball Super League: (gold) 2021
- Brazilian Cup: (gold) 2021
- Brazilian Super Cup: (silver) 2021
- Minas Gerais State Championship: (silver) 2021

=== Individuals ===
- 2014 World Grand Prix "Best Scorer"
- 2016 European Olympic Qualification "Best Outside Hitter"
- 2017–18 V.Premier League "Best Opposite"
- 2017–18 V.Premier League "Best Scorer"
- 2019–20 V.Premier League "Best Outside Hitter"
- 2019–20 V.Premier League "Best Scorer"
- 2021–22 Brazilian Volleyball Super League "Best Outside Hitter"
- 2021–22 South American Club Championship "Best Receiver"

== Personal life ==
On 9 July 2017, she married former basketball player Deniz Gençyürek.

== See also ==
- Turkish women in sports
