= 2016 South East Asian Junior Women's Volleyball Championships =

2016 SEA Women's U19 Championships
Tournament details
- Host country: Thailand
- Dates: 16–20 July
- Teams: 8
- Venues: 2 (in 1 host city)

Final positions
- Champions: Thailand (1st title)
- Runners-up: Vietnam
- Third place: Indonesia
- Fourth place: Philippines

Tournament awards
- MVP: (Thailand) Chatchu-on Moksri (THA)
- Best Setter: (Vietnam) Nguyễn Thu Hoài (VNM)
- Best OH: (Thailand) Wipawee Srithong (THA) (Thailand) Chatchu-on Moksri (THA)
- Best MB: (Vietnam) Luu Thi Hue (VNM) (Thailand) Tichakorn Boonlert (THA)
- Best OPP: (Thailand) Pimpichaya Kokram (THA)
- Best Libero: (Philippines) Kath Arado (PHI)

The 2016 South East Asian Women's U19 Volleyball Championships was held in Sisaket Province, Thailand, from 16 to 20 July 2016. Eight teams entered for this tournament.

== Pools composition ==
| Pool A | Pool B |
|---|---|
| Thailand(host); Philippines; New Zealand; Singapore | Vietnam; Indonesia; Malaysia; Australia |

== Preliminary round ==
- All times are UTC+07:00.

=== Pool A ===
| Pos | Team | Pld | W | L | Pts | SW | SL | SR | SPW | SPL | SPR | Qualification |
|---|---|---|---|---|---|---|---|---|---|---|---|---|
| 1 | Thailand | 3 | 3 | 0 | 9 | 9 | 0 | MAX | 225 | 103 | 2.184 | Semifinals |
| 2 | Philippines | 3 | 2 | 1 | 6 | 6 | 4 | 1.500 | 220 | 199 | 1.106 | Semifinals |
| 3 | New Zealand | 3 | 1 | 2 | 3 | 1 | 6 | 0.167 | 205 | 255 | 0.804 | 5th–8th place |
| 4 | Singapore | 2 | 0 | 2 | 0 | 0 | 6 | 0.000 | 154 | 247 | 0.623 | 5th–8th place |

| Date | Time | | Score | | Set 1 | Set 2 | Set 3 | Set 4 | Set 5 | Total | Report |
|---|---|---|---|---|---|---|---|---|---|---|---|
| 16 Jul | 14:00 | New Zealand | 0–3 | Thailand | 12–25 | 11–25 | 7–25 | – | – | 30–75 | Report |
| 16 Jul | 18:00 | Philippines | 3–0 | Singapore | 25–9 | 25–14 | 25–23 | – | – | 75–46 | Report |
| 17 Jul | 16:00 | Philippines | 3–1 | New Zealand | 25–23 | 25–13 | 17–25 | 25–17 | – | 92–78 | Report |
| 17 Jul | 18:30 | Singapore | 0–3 | Thailand | 5–25 | 8–25 | 7–25 | – | – | 20–75 | Report |
| 18 Jul | 14:00 | New Zealand | 3–1 | Singapore | 25–23 | 22–25 | 25–17 | 25–23 | – | 97–88 | Report |
| 18 Jul | 18:00 | Thailand | 3–0 | Philippines | 25–14 | 25–23 | 25–16 | – | – | 75–53 | Report |

=== Pool B ===
| Pos | Team | Pld | W | L | Pts | SW | SL | SR | SPW | SPL | SPR | Qualification |
|---|---|---|---|---|---|---|---|---|---|---|---|---|
| 1 | Vietnam | 3 | 3 | 0 | 9 | 9 | 0 | MAX | 226 | 124 | 1.823 | Semifinals |
| 2 | Indonesia | 3 | 2 | 1 | 6 | 6 | 3 | 2.000 | 206 | 168 | 1.226 | Semifinals |
| 3 | Australia | 3 | 1 | 2 | 3 | 3 | 6 | 0.500 | 160 | 198 | 0.808 | 5th–8th place |
| 4 | Malaysia | 3 | 0 | 3 | 0 | 0 | 9 | 0.000 | 123 | 225 | 0.547 | 5th–8th place |

0000000

| Date | Time | | Score | | Set 1 | Set 2 | Set 3 | Set 4 | Set 5 | Total | Report |
|---|---|---|---|---|---|---|---|---|---|---|---|
| 16 Jul | 12:00 | Vietnam | 3–0 | Malaysia | 25–7 | 25–14 | 25–11 | | | 75–32 | Report |
| 16 Jul | 16:00 | Indonesia | 3–0 | Australia | 25–20 | 25–15 | 25–14 | | | 75–49 | Report |
| 17 Jul | 12:00 | Malaysia | 0–3 | Australia | 9–25 | 17–25 | 22–25 | | | 48–75 | Report |
| 17 Jul | 14:00 | Vietnam | 3–0 | Indonesia | 25–15 | 25–17 | 26–24 | | | 76–56 | Report |
| 18 Jul | 12:00 | Malaysia | 0–3 | Indonesia | 17–25 | 15–25 | 11–25 | | | 43–75 | Report |
| 18 Jul | 16:00 | Australia | 0–3 | Vietnam | 12–25 | 12–25 | 12–25 | | | 36–75 | Report |

== Final round ==
- All times are UTC+07:00.

Semifinals
19 July – Sisaket Province
Vietnam | 3
Philippines | 0
19 July – Sisaket Province
Thailand | 3
Indonesia | 0

Final
20 July – Sisaket Province
Thailand | 3
Vietnam | 1
3rd place
20 July – Sisaket Province
Indonesia | 3
Philippines | 0

5th–8th places
19 July – Sisaket Province
Malaysia | 0
New Zealand | 3
19 July – Sisaket Province
Singapore | 0
Australia | 3

5th place
20 July – Sisaket Province
New Zealand | 1
Australia | 3

=== 5th–8th semifinals ===
| Date | Time | | Score | | Set 1 | Set 2 | Set 3 | Set 4 | Set 5 | Total | Report |
|---|---|---|---|---|---|---|---|---|---|---|---|
| 19 July | 12:00 | New Zealand | 3–0 | Malaysia | 25–0 | 25–0 | 25–0 | – | – | 75–0 | Report |
| 19 July | 14:00 | Australia | 3–0 | Singapore | 28–26 | 25–10 | 25–21 | – | – | 78–57 | Report |

=== Semifinals ===
| Date | Time | | Score | | Set 1 | Set 2 | Set 3 | Set 4 | Set 5 | Total | Report |
|---|---|---|---|---|---|---|---|---|---|---|---|
| 19 July | 16:00 | Thailand | 3–0 | Indonesia | 25–19 | 25–7 | 25–20 | – | – | 75–46 | Report |
| 19 July | 18:00 | Vietnam | 3–0 | Philippines | 25–14 | 25–16 | 25–18 | – | – | 75–48 | Report |

=== 5th place ===
| Date | Time | | Score | | Set 1 | Set 2 | Set 3 | Set 4 | Set 5 | Total | Report |
|---|---|---|---|---|---|---|---|---|---|---|---|
| 20 July | 11:00 | Australia | 3–1 | New Zealand | 25–17 | 22–25 | 26–24 | 25–17 | – | 98–83 | Report |

=== 3rd place ===
| Date | Time | | Score | | Set 1 | Set 2 | Set 3 | Set 4 | Set 5 | Total | Report |
|---|---|---|---|---|---|---|---|---|---|---|---|
| 20 July | 13.00 | Indonesia | 3–0 | Philippines | 25–12 | 25–21 | 25–17 | – | – | 75–50 | Report |

=== Final ===
| Date | Time | | Score | | Set 1 | Set 2 | Set 3 | Set 4 | Set 5 | Total | Report |
|---|---|---|---|---|---|---|---|---|---|---|---|
| 20 July | 16.00 | Thailand | 3–1 | Vietnam | 25–16 | 25–13 | 19–25 | 25–20 | – | 94–74 | Report |

== Final standing ==
| Rank | Team |
|---|---|
| 1st place, gold medalist(s) | Thailand |
| 2nd place, silver medalist(s) | Vietnam |
| 3rd place, bronze medalist(s) | Indonesia |
| 4 | Philippines |
| 5 | Australia |
| 6 | New Zealand |
| 7 | Singapore |
| 8 | Malaysia |

== Awards ==
- Most valuable player
  (Thailand) Chatchu-on Moksri
- Best setter
  (Vietnam) Nguyen Thu Hoai
- Best outside spikers
  (Thailand) Wipawee Srithong
  (Thailand) Chatchu-on Moksri
- Best middle blockers
  (Vietnam) Luu Thi Hue
  (Thailand) Tichakorn Boonlert
- Best opposite spiker
  (Thailand) Pimpichaya Kokram
- Best libero
  (Philippines) Kath Arado
