= 2022 ASEAN Grand Prix squads =

This article shows the 14-player roster of all participating teams at the 2022 ASEAN Grand Prix.

== Indonesia ==
Head coach: (Indonesia) Risco Matulesy

- 1 Nandita Salsabila OH
- 2 Ratri Wulandari OH
- 3 Megawati Pertiwi OP
- 6 Yolana Pangestika S
- 7 Amalia Nabila (c) OH
- 8 Tisya Putri S
- 9 Arsela Purnama OH
- 10 Putri Andya Agustina MB
- 11 Shintia Mauludina MB
- 14 Dita Azizah L
- 15 Yuliana Yolla OP
- 17 Wilda Sugandi MB
- 20 Shella Onnan MB

== Philippines ==
Head coach: (Philippines) Sherwin Meneses

- 3 Celine Domingo MB
- 5 Risa Sato MB
- 6 Jeanette Panaga MB
- 7 Michele Theresa Gumabao OP
- 8 Jorella Marie de Jesus L
- 10 Maria Paulina Soriano MB
- 11 Kyla Llana Atienza L
- 12 Julia Melissa Morado-De Guzman (c) S
- 13 Fille Saint Merced Cainglet-Cayetano OH
- 15 Kyle Negrito S
- 16 Rizza Jane Mandapat OP
- 17 Rosemarie Vargas OH
- 18 Diana Mae Carlos OP
- 23 Jessica Margarett Galanza OH

== Thailand ==
Head coach: (Thailand) Danai Sriwatcharamethakul

- 1 Wipawee Srithong OH
- 2 Piyanut Pannoy L
- 3 Pornpun Guedpard (c) S
- 6 Kannika Thipachot OH
- 8 Watchareeya Nuanjam MB
- 12 Hattaya Bamrungsuk MB
- 13 Natthanicha Jaisaen S
- 15 Kaewkalaya Kamulthala MB
- 16 Pimpichaya Kokram OP
- 18 Ajcharaporn Kongyot OH
- 21 Thanacha Sooksod OP
- 22 Nattaporn SanitklangL
- 24 Tichakorn Boonlert MB
- 25 Sasipaporn JanthawisutOH

== Vietnam ==
Head coach: (Vietnam) Nguyễn Tuan Kiêt

- 1 Lê Thị Thanh LiênL
- 3 Trần Thị Thanh Thúy (c) OH
- 6 Nguyễn Thị UyênOH
- 7 Phạm Thị Nguyệt AnhOH
- 9 Trần Thị Bích ThủyMB
- 11 Hoàng Thị Kiều TrinhOP
- 14Võ Thị Kim ThoaS
- 15 Nguyễn Thị TrinhMB
- 16 Vi Thi Như QuỳnhOH
- 17Đoàn Thị Xuân OP
- 18 Lưu Thị HuệMB
- 19 Đoàn Thị Lâm Oanh S
- 22 Nguyễn Thị Kim LiênL
- 23 Lý Thị LuyếnMB
