= Julieta Lazcano =

Argentine volleyball player

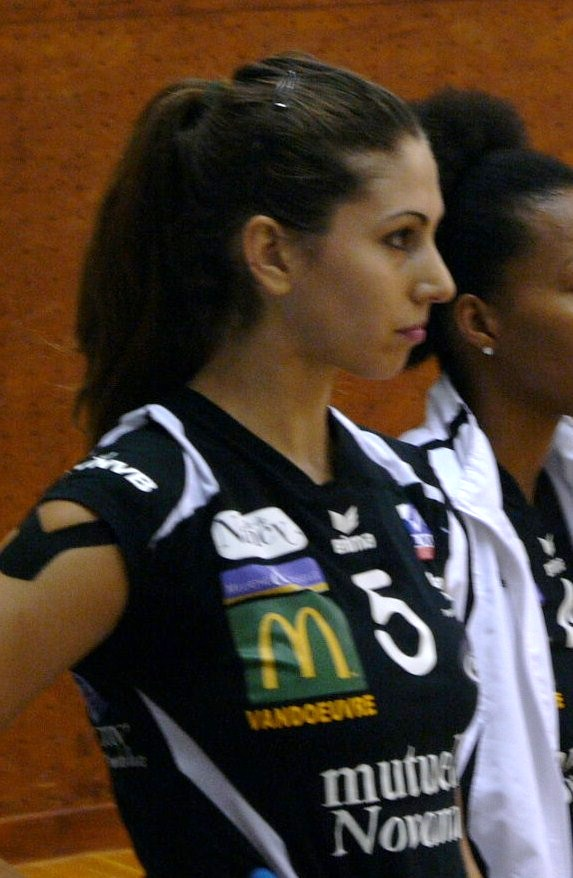

Personal information
- Full name: Julieta Constanza Lazcano Colodrero
- Nickname: Juli
- Born: 25 July 1989 (age 37); Córdoba, Argentina
- Height: 1.90 m (6 ft 3 in)
- Weight: 74 kg (163 lb)
- Spike: 312 cm (123 in)
- Block: 293 cm (115 in)

Volleyball information
- Position: Middle blocker
- Current club: Fluminense Vôlei (BR)
- Number: 10 (club) and 11(national team)

National team
2005–	Argentina
Honours
Pan American Games
Bronze medal – third place	2019 Lima	Team
- Last updated: 13 January 2017

Julieta Lazcano (born 25 July 1989) is an Argentine volleyball player who participated with the Argentina national team at the Pan-American Volleyball Cup (in 2006, 2015, 2016), the FIVB Volleyball World Grand Prix (in 2011, 2014, 2015, 2016), the 2014 FIVB Volleyball Women's World Championship in Italy, the 2015 FIVB Volleyball Women's World Cup in Japan, the 2015 Pan American Games in Canada, the 2016 Summer Olympics in Brazil, and the 2018 FIVB Volleyball Women's World Championship.

Lazcano has also played at junior level for the Argentine national team.

At club level, Lazcano played for Poeta Lugones, General Paz Juniors, Municipalidad de Córdoba, Olímpico de Freyre, Pesaro, Gimnasia y Esgrima (La Plata), Nancy, and Istres before moving to Paris Saint Cloud in 2016.

== Clubs ==
- (Argentina) Club Poeta Lugones (2002–2004)
- (Argentina) General Paz Juniors (2004–2006)
- (Argentina) Club Municipalidad de Córdoba (2006–2006)
- (Argentina) Olimpico Freyre (2006–2007)
- (Italy) Scavolini Pesaro (2007–2009)
- (Argentina) Gimnasia y Esgrima (LP) (2009–2011)
- (France) Vandœuvre Nancy (2011–2013)
- (France) Istres (2013–2016)
- (France) Paris Saint Cloud (2016–2017)
- (France) Saint Raphael Var Volley-Ball (2017–2018)
- (Brazil) Curitiba Vôlei (2018–2019)
- (Poland) E.Leclerc Radomka Radom (2019–2020)
- Gresik Petrokimia Pupuk Indonesia (2022)
