= Madeline Guillén =

Dominican Republic volleyball player (born 2001)

Personal information
- Full name: Madeline Jazmín Guillén Paredes
- Nationality: Dominican
- Born: 4 June 2001 (age 25); Manoguayabo, Santo Domingo
- Height: 1.86 m (6 ft 1 in)
- Weight: 74 kg (163 lb)
- Spike: 273 cm (107 in)
- Block: 242 cm (95 in)

Volleyball information
- Position: Outside hitter

Career
Years	Teams
2016–2018; 2018–2019; 2020; 2020–2021; 2022–2023; 2023–2024; 2025–	Club Malanga; Cristo Rey; Mardin BB; Leixões; Bandung BJB Tandamata; Göztepe; Bandung BJB Tandamata

National team
2021–	Dominican Republic
Honours
Women's volleyball
Representing the Dominican Republic
Pan-American Cup
Gold medal – first place	2025 Colima	Team
Bolivarian Games
Silver medal – second place	2022 Valledupar	Team

Madeline Jazmín Guillén Paredes (born 4 June 2001 in Manoguayabo) is a Dominican Republic volleyball player who played the 2024 Summer Olympics.

== Career ==
=== 2024 ===
She was part of the Dominican Republic national team that finished eight, losing 0–3 to Brazil in the quarterfinals of the 2024 Summer Olympics.
