= Ceren Kapucu =

Turkish volleyball player (born 1993)

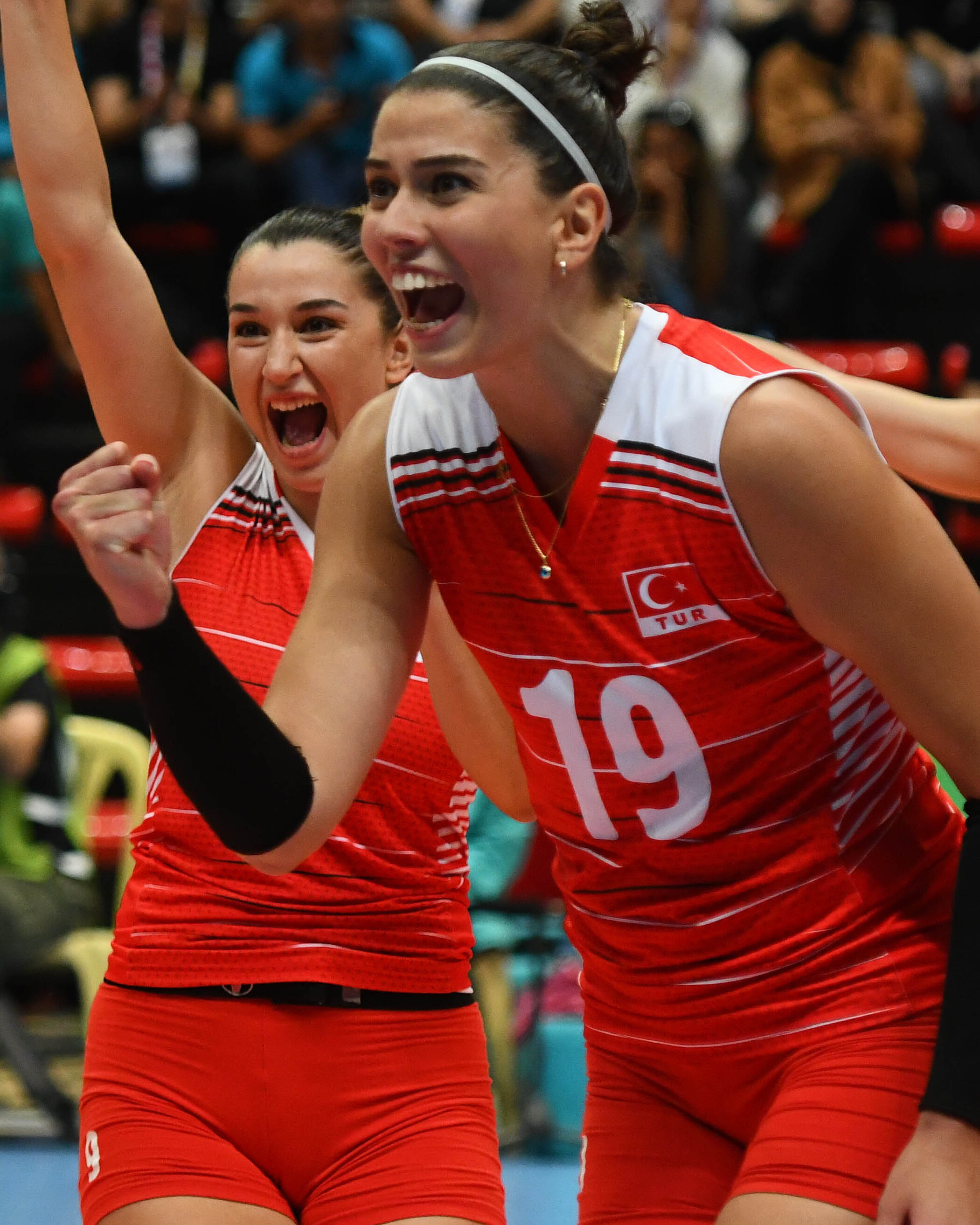

Personal information
- Full name: Ceren Kapucu
- Born: 19 July 1993 (age 33); Istanbul, Turkey
- Height: 1.94 m (6 ft 4 in)

Volleyball information
- Position: Opposite
- Current club: Bandung BJB Tandamata

Career
Years
- 2008–11
- 2011–12
- 2012–13
- 2013–14
- 2014–15
- 2015–17
- 2017–18
- 2018–19
- 2019–21
- 2021–22
- 2022–2023
- 2023–
Teams
- (Turkey) Vakıfbank II
- (Turkey) Vakıfbank Türk Telekom
- (Turkey) Sarıyer Belediyesi
- (Turkey) Bakırköy Belediyesi Yeşilyurt
- (Turkey) Vakıfbank
- (Turkey) Çanakkale Belediyespor
- (Turkey) Beylikdüzü
- (Turkey) Beşiktaş
- (Turkey) Fenerbahçe Opet
- (Turkey) Yeşilyurt
- (Brazil) Osasco/São Cristóvão Saúde
- (Indonesia) Bandung BJB Tandamata

National team
- 2008–11
- 2011–present
- (Turkey) youth national team
- (Turkey) national team
Honours
Women's volleyball
Representing Turkey
European Championship
Bronze medal – third place	2011 Belgrade	Team
European League
Silver medal – second place	2015 Hungary	Team
Youth Balkan Championship
Silver medal – second place	2009 Sarajevo	Team
Gold medal – first place	2008 Portaria	Team
Islamic Solidarity Games
Gold medal – first place	2021 Konya	Team
- Last updated: August 2013

Ceren Kapucu (née Kestirengöz, born 19 July 1993 in Istanbul, Turkey) is a Turkish volleyball player. She is 194 cm and plays as a hitter. She is part of the Turkey women's national volleyball team.

She was born on 19 July 1993 in Istanbul to former volleyball player parents. She has a brother. Kestirengöz began playing volleyball at the age of eleven and entered Vakıfbank Güneş Sigorta's farm team. She graduated from St. Joseph High School in Istanbul. In the 2013–14 term, she begins to study Business Administration at Bahçeşehir University.

Ceren Kestirengöz played one season in the A-team of Vakıfbank and then was sent to Sarıyer Belediyesi on loan in the 2012–13 season. For the 2013–14 season, she was transferred by the Yeşilyurtspor.

Kestirengöz debuted in the youth national team in 2008, which won the gold medal at the Girls' Youth Balkan Volleyball Championship held in Portaria, Greece. The next year, she was again part of the youth national team, which became runner-up at the Balkan Championship in Sarajevo, Bosnia and Herzegovina.

In 2011, she won the bronze medal with the national team at the Women's European Volleyball Championship held in Belgrade, Serbia. Kapucu played for the national team at the 2012 Women's European Volleyball League, which placed 8th.

== Awards ==
National team

- 2008 Girls' Youth Balkan Volleyball Championship – (gold)
- 2009 Girls' Youth Balkan Volleyball Championship – (silver)
- 2011 Women's European Volleyball Championship – (bronze)
- 2015 Women's European Volleyball League – (silver)

== See also ==
- Turkish women in sports
