= Nguyễn Thu Hoài =

Vietnamese volleyball player (born 1998)

Personal information
- Full name: Nguyễn Thu Hoài
- Born: September 16, 1998 (age 28); Thái Bình, Việt Nam
- Height: 1.74 m (5 ft 9 in)
- Weight: 60 kg (132 lb)
- Spike: 290 cm (9 ft 6 in)
- Block: 283 cm (9 ft 3 in)

Volleyball information
- Position: Setter
- Current club: (Vietnam) Vietinbank VC
- Number: 20

Career
Years	Teams
2012 – 2024	(Vietnam) Vietinbank VC

National team
2016 – 2017; 2017 – 2019; 2018 – 2022	Vietnam U20; Vietnam U23; Vietnam

Nguyễn Thu Hoài (born September 16, 1998) is retired volleyball player, a former member of the Vietnam women's national volleyball team and Vietinbank VC.

== Clubs ==
- (Vietnam) Vietinbank VC (2012 – 2024)

== Career ==
=== National team ===
==== Senior team ====
- 2018 Asian Games — 6th Place
- 2018 AVC Cup — 5th Place
- 2019 ASEAN Grand Prix — 4th Place
- 2019 SEA Games — Silver Medal
- 2021 SEA Games — Silver Medal

==== U23 team ====
- 2017 Asian Championship — 3rd Place
- 2019 Asian Peace Cup — Champion
- 2019 Asian Championship — 3rd Place

==== U20 team ====
- 2016 ASEAN Championship — Runner-up
- 2016 Asian Championship — 4th Place

=== Club ===
- 2014 Vietnam League — 3rd Place, with Vietinbank VC
- 2015 Vietnam League — 2nd Place, with Vietinbank VC
- 2016 Vietnam League — Champion, with Vietinbank VC
- 2017 Vietnam League — 3rd Place, with Vietinbank VC
- 2018 Vietnam League — 3rd Place, with Vietinbank VC
- 2019 Vietnam League — 2nd Place, with Vietinbank VC

== Awards ==
- 2016 ASEAN Junior Championship "Best Setter"
- 2019 Vietnam League "Best setter"
