= Katerina Zhidkova =

Ukrainian-born Azerbaijani volleyball player

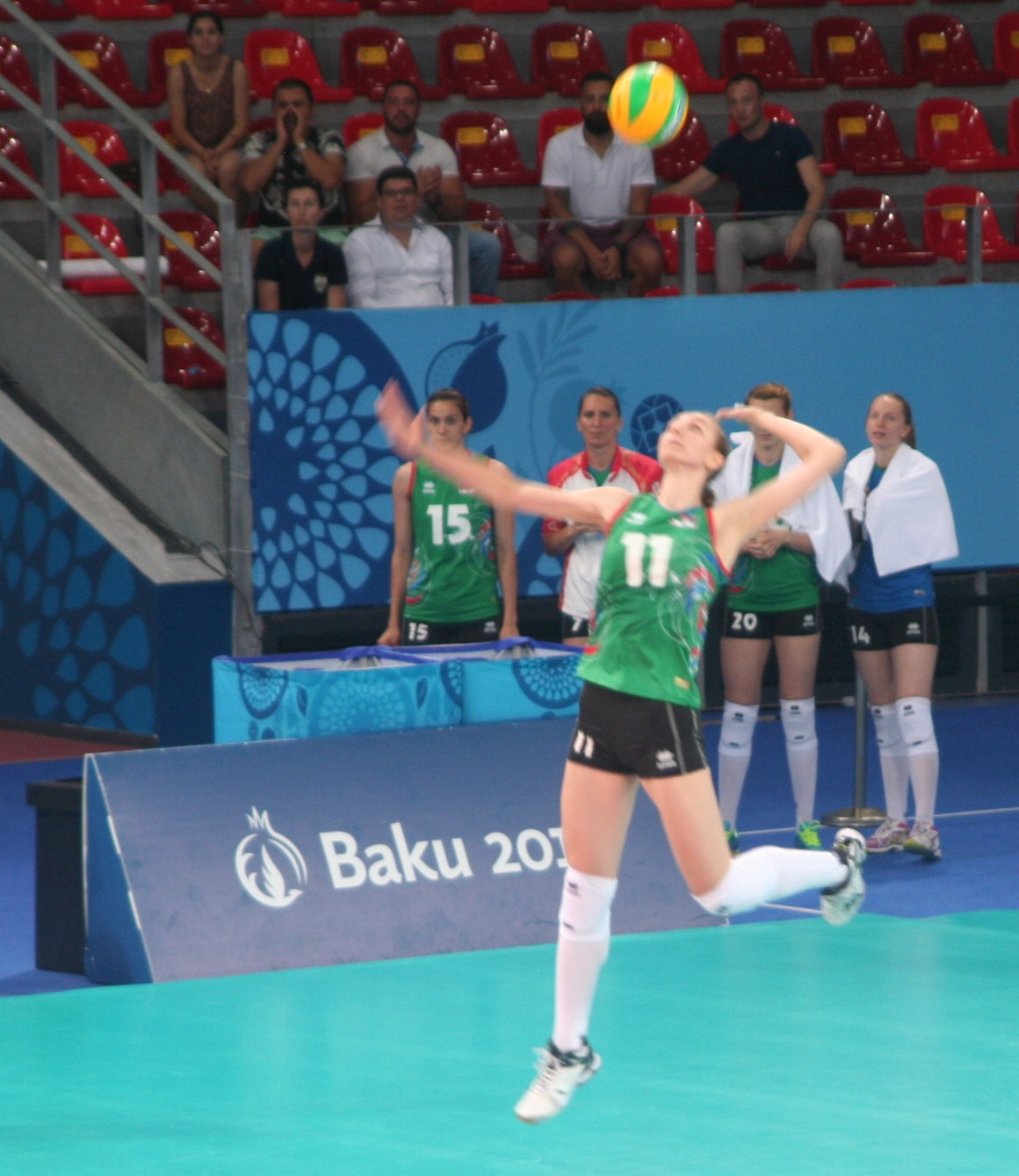

Personal information
- Nationality: Ukrainian; Azerbaijani
- Born: 28 September 1989 (age 37); Cherkasy, Ukraine
- Height: 1.87 m (6 ft 2 in)
- Weight: 72 kg (159 lb)
- Spike: 300 cm (118 in)
- Block: 287 cm (113 in)

Volleyball information
- Position: Opposite
- Current club: VW Jakarta Elektrik PLN
- Number: 11

National team
Azerbaijan

Katerina Zhidkova (born 28 September 1989) is a Ukrainian-born Azerbaijani volleyball player who plays for Indonesian Club VW Jakarta Elektrik PLN and the Azerbaijani national team.

She participated at the 2017 Women's European Volleyball Championship.
