= Bandung BJB Tandamata =

Indonesian women's volleyball club

- Full name: Bandung BJB Tandamata
- Short name: BJB
- Founded: 2003; 22 years ago
- Ground: GOR C-Tra Arena, Bandung (Capacity: 5,000)
- Owner: Bank BJB and West Java Government
- Chairman: (Indonesia) Ayi Subarna
- Manager: (Indonesia) Alim Suseno
- Captain: (Indonesia) Agustin Wulandhari
- League: Proliga
- 2023: Champions

Championships
- Proliga Champion

Bandung BJB Tandamata is an Indonesian professional women's volleyball club based in ฺBandung and owned and managed by the Bank BJB. The club was founded in 2003 and currently a participant in the women's Proliga. Bandung BJB Tandamata are the defending champions women's Proliga and has won the title fourth times in the women's Proliga.

== History ==
Bandung BJB Tandamata was founded in 2003 under the name Bandung Artdeco Bank Jabar. In the first season in women's proliga in the same year, this team won the title after defeating Gresik Petrokimia in the final round.

== Team roster ==
Season 2023

As of January 2, 2023

Bandung BJB Tandamata – 2023
No.	Name	Birthdate	Position
1	(Indonesia) Yulis Indahyani		Libero
2	(Indonesia) Sari Hartati		Opposite
4	(Indonesia) Dya Hawa Nur Fitria		Outside Hitter
5	(Indonesia) Syavina Amelia Erry		Opposite
6	(Indonesia) Wintang Dyah Kumala Sakti		Outside Hitter
7	(Indonesia) Nandita Ayu Salsabila		Opposite
8	(Indonesia) Tanisa Nurma Zakia		Outside Hitter
10	(Indonesia) Miva Ratna Sari		Outside Hitter
11	(Dominican Republic) Madeline Guillén		Opposite Hitter
12	(Indonesia) Rika Dwi Latri		Outside Hitter
13	(Indonesia) Fitriyani Nurjanah		Setter
14	(Indonesia) Tasya Aprilia Putri		Libero
16	(Indonesia) Tiara Sanger		Setter
17	(Indonesia) Wilda Nurfadhilah (C)		Middle Blocker
18	(Indonesia) Dian Wijayanti		Opposite
19	(Turkey) Ceren Kapucu		Opposite
20	(Indonesia) Shella Bernadetha		Middle Blocker
21	(Indonesia) Maradanti Namari Tegariani		Middle Blocker

Coach	(Indonesia) Alim Suseno
Assistant Coaches	(Indonesia) Hali Juhali, M. Dede Syifaudin

== Honours ==
=== Liga ===
- Proliga
  - Champions (4): 2003, 2006, 2022, 2023
  - Runner-up (1): 2018
