= Jakarta Popsivo Polwan =

Indonesian women's volleyball club

- Full name: Jakarta Popsivo Polwan
- Short name: JPP
- Founded: 2007; 19 years ago
- Ground: Jakarta (Capacity: -)
- Owner: Indonesia National Police
- Chairman: -
- Head Coach: (Thailand) Chamnan Dokmai
- Captain: (Dominican Republic) Niverka Marte
- League: Proliga
- 2023: 5th
- Championships: Proliga Champion

Uniforms
Home	Away

Jakarta Popsivo Polwan is an Indonesian professional women's volleyball club based in Jakarta and owned and managed by the Indonesian National Police. The club was founded in 2007 and currently a participant in the women's Proliga. This club has won the title three times in the women's Proliga.

== Current roster ==
Season 2023

As of February 2, 2023

Jakarta Popsivo Polwan – 2023 Proliga
No.	Name	Birthdate	Height	Position
1	(Indonesia) Fajriahni Ema Herawati			Outside Hitter
2	(Indonesia) Rani Setiawati			Outside Hitter
3	(Indonesia) Yasmin Nafisah			Outside Hitter
4	(Indonesia) Putri Wulansari			Opposite
5	(Indonesia) Dhini Indah			Outside Hitter
7	(Dominican Republic) Niverka Marte (C)			Setter
8	(Brazil) Franciane Richter			Opposite
9	(Indonesia) Faiska Dwi Permata Ratri			Opposite
10	(Indonesia) Agfarida Desy Maharani			Middle Blocker
11	(Indonesia) Hanifa Nahda Aisa			Middle Blocker
13	(Indonesia) Difa Ameyda			Setter
14	(Indonesia) Zahwa Aliah Jasmien			Libero
15	(Indonesia) Susilawati			Setter
16	(Indonesia) Lerigia Devina Oktaviani			Outside Hitter
17	(Indonesia) Maya Indri			Middle Blocker
18	(Indonesia) Afra Hasna Nurhaliza			Setter
21	(Indonesia) Rosalina Wardani			Libero
24	(Indonesia) Arsela Nuari Purnama			Outside Hitter

Coach	(Thailand) Chamnan Dokmai
Assistant Coach	(Indonesia) Indra Wahyudi Harahap

== Honours ==
=== Proliga ===
- Champions (3): 2012, 2013, 2019
- Runners-up (2): 2011, 2015
