= Indonesian women's Proliga =

Indonesian volleyball league

Proliga
- Current season, competition or edition: 2026 Indonesian women's Proliga
- Sport: Volleyball
- Founded: 2002; 24 years ago
- Founder: PBVSI
- No. of teams: 7
- Country: Indonesia
- Most recent champion: Jakarta Pertamina Enduro (3rd title)
- Most titles: Jakarta Elektrik PLN (6 titles)
- Broadcasters: Moji; Champions TV; Vidio; IndiHome TV
- Website: https://www.proliga.co.id/

Proliga is the Indonesian professional top-level competition for volleyball clubs. It is organised by Persatuan Bola Voli Seluruh Indonesia (PBVSI) or Indonesian Volleyball Association. It was founded in 2002.

== Teams ==
=== Current teams (2026 season) ===
2026 Indonesian women's Proliga
Club		Head Coach	Captain	Main sponsor
BJB	Bandung BJB Tandamata	(Indonesia) Samsul Jais		Bank BJB
GPP	Gresik Petrokimia Pupuk Indonesia	~~(Indonesia) Ayub Hidayat~~ (China) Jiang Jie	(Indonesia) Medi Yoku	Pupuk Indonesia
JEP	Jakarta Elektrik PLN	(Thailand) Chamnan Dokmai	(Indonesia) Agustin Wulandhari	PLN
JPE	Jakarta Pertamina Enduro	(Turkey) Bülent Karslıoğlu	(Indonesia) Hany Budiarti	Pertamina
JPP	Jakarta Popsivo Polwan	(Argentina) Gerardo Martin Daglio	(Indonesia) Amalia Fajrina	Indonesian National Police
LIV	Jakarta Livin' Mandiri	~~(South Korea) Ki-joong Kim~~ (Thailand) Danai Sriwatcharamethakul		Bank Mandiri
MFC	Medan Falcons	(Japan) Marcos Sugiyama		Emtek

== Honours ==
=== Champions ===
Year	Champions	Runners-up	Reference
2002	Jakarta Monas	Gresik Petrokimia	
2003	Bandung Art Deco Bank Jabar	Gresik Petrokimia	
2004	Jakarta Elektrik PLN	Jakarta Monas Bank DKI	
2005	Jakarta BNI Maybank	Jakarta Elektrik PLN	
2006	Bandung Art Deco Bank Jabar	Gresik Petrokimia	
2007	Surabaya Bank Jatim	Gresik Petrokimia	
2008	Surabaya Bank Jatim	Jakarta Elektrik PLN	
2009	Jakarta Elektrik PLN	Surabaya Bank Jatim	
2010	Jakarta BNI Maybank	Jakarta Elektrik PLN	
2011	Jakarta Elektrik PLN	Jakarta Popsivo Polwan	
2012	Jakarta Popsivo Polwan	Jakarta Elektrik PLN	
2013	Jakarta PGN Popsivo Polwan	Manokwari Valeria Papua Barat	
2014	Jakarta Pertamina Energi	Manokwari Valeria Papua Barat	
2015	Jakarta Elektrik PLN	Jakarta PGN Popsivo Polwan	
2016	Jakarta Elektrik PLN	Jakarta Pertamina Energi	
2017	Jakarta Elektrik PLN	Jakarta Pertamina Energi	
2018	Jakarta Pertamina Energi	Bandung Bank BJB Pakuan	
2019	Jakarta PGN Popsivo Polwan	Jakarta Pertamina Energi	
~~2020~~
~~2020~~	Edition cancelled due to COVID-19 pandemic in Indonesia.		
~~2021~~	Edition cancelled due to COVID-19 pandemic in Indonesia.		
2022	Bandung BJB Tandamata	Gresik Petrokimia Pupuk Indonesia	
2023	Bandung BJB Tandamata	Jakarta Pertamina Fastron	
2024	Jakarta BIN	Jakarta Elektrik PLN	
2025	Jakarta Pertamina Enduro	Jakarta Popsivo Polwan	
2026	Jakarta Pertamina Enduro	Gresik Petrokimia Pupuk Indonesia	

=== Titles by clubs ===
Teams	Championships	Runners-up	Years won	Years runners-up
Jakarta Elektrik PLN	6	5	2004, 2009, 2011, 2015, 2016, 2017	2005, 2008, 2010, 2012, 2024
Jakarta Pertamina Enduro	4	4	2014, 2018, 2025, 2026	2016, 2017, 2019, 2023
Bandung BJB Tandamata	4	1	2003, 2006, 2022, 2023	2018
Jakarta Popsivo Polwan	3	3	2012, 2013, 2019	2011, 2015, 2025
Surabaya Bank Jatim	2	1	2007, 2008	2009
Jakarta BNI 46	2	0	2005, 2010	
Jakarta Bank DKI	1	1	2002	2004
Jakarta BIN	1	0	2024	

== See also ==
- Indonesian men's Proliga
