= Danai Sriwatcharamethakul =

Thai volleyball coach

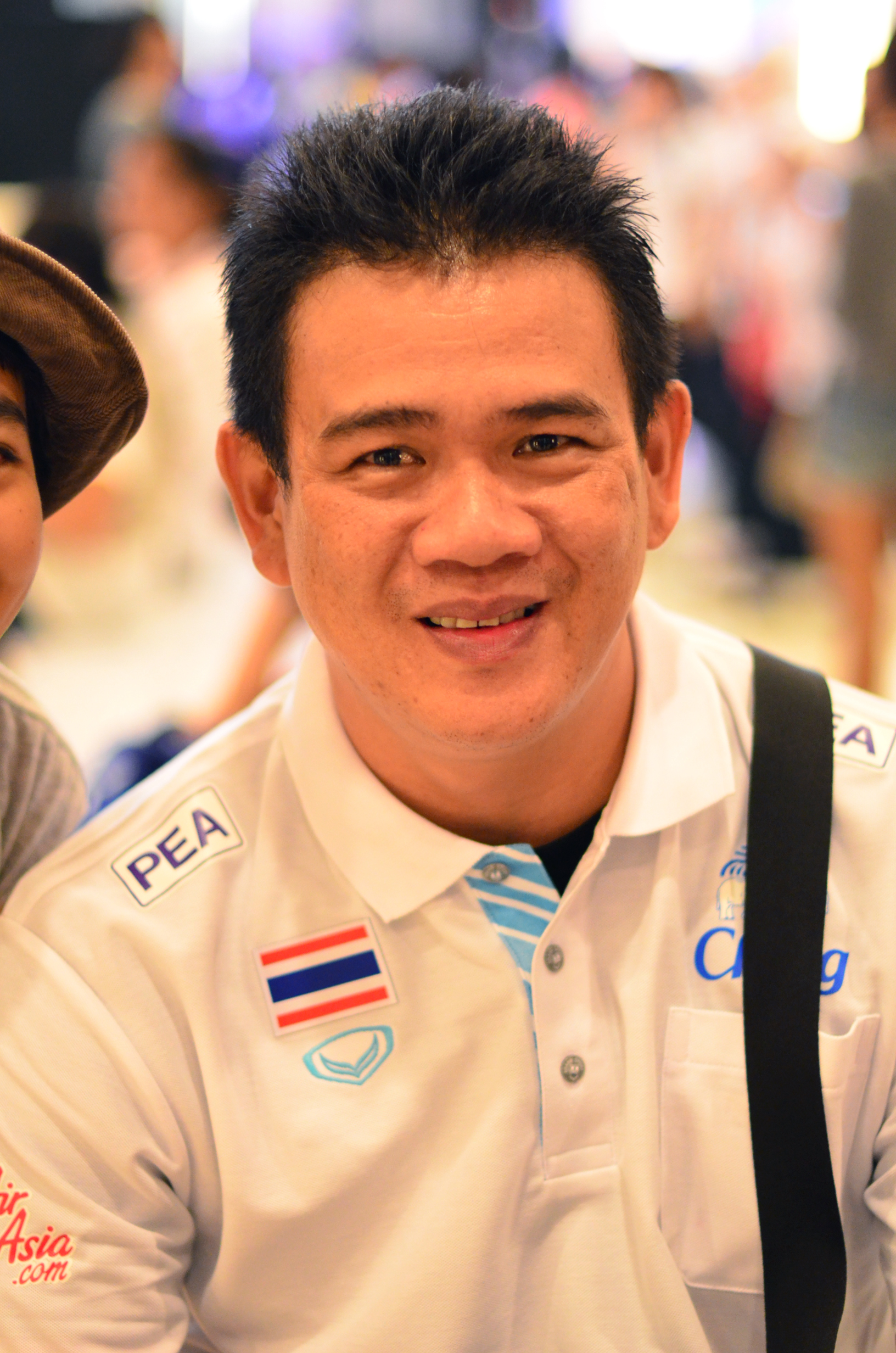

Personal information
- Full name: Danai Sriwatcharamethakul
- Nickname: Duan
- Nationality: Thailand
- Born: October 5, 1970 (age 56); Chum Phae, Khon Kaen, Thailand
Honours
Montreux Volley Masters
Silver medal – second place	2016 Switzerland	Team

Danai Sriwatcharamethakul (Thai: ดนัย ศรีวัชรเมธากุล, born 5 October 1970) also known as Coach Duan (Thai: โค้ชด่วน) is a Thai volleyball coach. He is the head coach of the Thailand women's national volleyball team.

== Career ==
=== As a volleyball player ===
- The best athlete Male volleyball College Sports Physical Education

=== As a coach ===
Club/Team	Country	year
National Team	Thailand	2016–2024
Jakarta BIN	Indonesia	2024–

== Royal decorations ==
- 2013 - Commander (Third Class) of The Most Exalted Order of the White Elephant
