= Tichakorn Boonlert =

Thai volleyball player (born 2001)

Personal information
- Full name: Tichakorn Boonlert
- Nickname: Tarn
- Nationality: Thai
- Born: March 22, 2001 (age 25) Nonthaburi, Thailand
- Height: 1.81 m (5 ft 11 in)
- Weight: 74 kg (163 lb)
- Spike: 294 cm (116 in)
- Block: 283 cm (111 in)

Volleyball information
- Position: Middle Blocker
- Current club: Nakhon Ratchasima
- Number: 36

National team
- Years: Team
- 2019–2024: Thailand
Honours
Women's volleyball
Representing Thailand
Asian Championship
Silver medal – second place	2019 Seoul
Southeast Asian Games
Gold medal – first place	2019 Philippines	Team

Tichakorn Boonlert (Thai: ฑิชากร บุญเลิศ, born 22 March 2001 in Nonthaburi) is a Thai indoor volleyball player. She is a member of the Thailand women's national volleyball team.

== Club ==
- (Thailand) Nakornnont (2015–2017) –Present
- (Thailand) Est Cola (2017–2018)
- (Thailand) Nakornnont (2021–2022)
- (Thailand) Diamond Food (2022–2024)
- (Azerbaijan) Gence (2024–2025)
- (Thailand) Nakhon Ratchasima (2024–2026)
- (Thailand) Sripatum University (2026–2027)

== Awards ==
=== Individual ===
- 2022 ASEAN Grand Prix - "Best Middle Blocker"
- 2025 AVC Champions League - "Best Middle Blocker"

=== Club ===
- 2017 Thai–Denmark Super League - Bronze medal, with Nakornnont
- 2018 Thai–Denmark Super League - Bronze medal, with Nakornnont
- 2018–19 Thailand League - Third, with Nakornnont
- 2019 Thai–Denmark Super League - Third, with Nakornnont
- 2023 Asian Club Championship – Runner-up, with Diamond Food
