= VW Jakarta Elektrik PLN =

Volleyball club in Jakarta, Indonesia

Jakarta Elektrik PLN
- Full name: Jakarta Elektrik PLN
- Short name: JEP
- Founded: 2004; 21 years ago
- Ground: GOR PLN Cigereleng, Bandung (Capacity: 50)
- Owner: Perusahaan Listrik Negara
- Chairman: (Indonesia) Danni Irawan
- Manager: (Indonesia) Putri Arsyadany G. Akmalaputri
- Captain: (Indonesia) Putri Andya Agustina
- League: Proliga
- 2023: 6th

Championships
- Proliga Champion

Jakarta Elektrik PLN is an Indonesian professional women's volleyball club based in Jakarta and owned and managed by the PT. Perusahaan Listrik Negara. The club was founded in 2004 and is currently a participant in the women's Proliga. This club has won the title six times in the Proliga, being the most among other women's volleyball clubs in the Proliga.

== History ==
The first championship won by the club was in 2004 and the next year, the club was the runner-up.

In 2009 and 2011 the club won again the championship, having won the silver medal in 2008, 2010 and 2012. The next championships were in 2015 and 2016. The club participated at the 2016 Asian Women's Club Volleyball Championship.

== Current roster ==
Season 2023

As of Januari 19, 2023

Jakarta Elektrik PLN – Proliga 2023
No.	Name	Birthdate	Position
1	(Indonesia) Shindy Sasgia Dwi Yanuar		Middle Blocker
2	(Indonesia) Salsabila Dara Putri		Outside Hitter
3	(Indonesia) Shinta Ainni Fathurrahmi		Setter
4	(Azerbaijan) (Uzbekistan) Odina Aliyeva		Outside Hitter
5	(Indonesia) Eris Septia Wulandari		Libero
6	(Indonesia) Junaida Santi		Opposite
7	(Indonesia) Vera Mayola		Outside Hitter
8	(Indonesia) Putri Lestari		Middle Blocker
9	(Indonesia) Lutfiyatul Insyiah (c)		Setter
10	(Indonesia) Alya Regifa Fahira		opposite
11	(Azerbaijan) Katerina Zhidkova		Opposite
12	(Indonesia) Chika Swinerlin Pratiwi		Libero
13	(Indonesia) Annisa Siti Rahmawati		Setter
17	(Indonesia) Dinda Syifa Ammelia		Middle Blocker
18	(Indonesia) Juhaidar Yus Aini		Outside Hitter
19	(Indonesia) Ola Yosephin Puhili		Middle Blocker

Coach
(Azerbaijan) Ziya Racabov

== Honours ==
Proliga
- Champions (6): 2004, 2009, 2011, 2015, 2016, 2017
- Runners-up (4): 2005, 2008, 2010, 2012

AVC (Asian competitions)
- Group stage(1): 2016
