= Gresik Petrokimia Pupuk Indonesia =

Indonesia women's volleyball club

- Full name: Gresik Petrokimia Pupuk Indonesia Volleyball Club
- Short name: GPP
- Founded: 2002; 24 years ago
- Ground: GOR Tri Dharma Gresik, East Java (Capacity: 2,200)
- Manager: Petrokimia Gresik
- Manager: (Indonesia) Koko Sudiro
- Head Coach: (Indonesia) Ayub Hidayat
- Captain: (Indonesia) Mediol Stiovani Yoku
- League: Proliga
- 2023: Regular season: 4th Postseason: Third place

Uniforms
Home	Away

Gresik Petrokimia Pupuk Indonesia is an Indonesian professional volleyball team. The team was founded in 2002. They are based in Gresik, East Java and are members of the Indonesian Volleyball Federation (PBVSI).

In Proliga, the club has won second place six times, being the most among other women's volleyball clubs.

== Current roster ==
As of October 11, 2022

Gresik Petrokimia Pupuk Indonesia – Livoli Divisi Utama 2022
No.	Name	Birthdate	Height	Position
1	(Indonesia) Dhea Cahya Pitaloka			Middle Blocker
2	(Indonesia) Ajeng Nur Cahya			Setter
3	(Indonesia) Janitra Ascarya Kesumanging			Setter
4	(Indonesia) Bela Sabrina			Outside Hitter
5	(Indonesia) Mediol Stiovanny Yoku (C)			Outside Hitter
6	(Indonesia) Nabila Purwita			Opposite
7	(Indonesia) Nandita Ayu Salsabila			Opposite
8	(Indonesia) Putri Hidayanti Agustin			Outside Hitter
10	(Indonesia) Geofanny Eka Cahyaningtyas			Middle Blocker
11	(Indonesia) Shinta Ainni			Setter
13	(Indonesia) Amelia Dwisari			Middle Blocker
14	(Indonesia) Shafina Ayu Larasati			Outside Hitter
15	(Indonesia) Yolla Yuliana			Outside Hitter
16	(Indonesia) Siti Romadhani			Libero
17	(Indonesia) Wilda Nurfadilah			Middle Blocker
18	(Indonesia) Jesy Aisya			Outside Hitter
19	(Indonesia) Berllian Marsheilla			Libero
20	(Indonesia) Ayun Asrining Amalia			Opposite

As of November 11, 2023

Coach	(Indonesia) Pedro Bertholomeus Lilipaly
Assistant coaches	(Indonesia) Andhi Pertama Putro and Rafito Naufal
Manager	(Indonesia) Koko Sudiro

== Honours ==
- Proliga
  - Runners-up (6): 2002, 2003, 2004, 2006, 2007, 2022
- Livoli Divisi Utama
  - Champion (1): 2005, 2023
  - Runners-up (2): 2012, 2013
- Livoli Divisi I
  - Champion (1): 2008
  - Runners-up (2): 2010, 2019
