= Volleyball at the 2005 Mediterranean Games – Women's team rosters =

This article shows the rosters of all participating teams at the women's indoor volleyball tournament at the 2005 Mediterranean Games in Almería.

== Albania ==
No.	Name	Date of birth	Position	Club
-	Kreshnik Tartari		coach	
1	Amarilda Prenga	18 July 1981	outside hitter	
2	Merlin Fagu	2 June 1981		
3	Edlira Huqi	30 July 1976		
4	Dorina Lapardhoti	29 September 1982	libero	
5	Kleda Shkurti	23 February 1986		
9	Anila Hoxha	2 October 1977		
10	Jonida Shollo	6 April 1978		
12	Marsela Çalleku	7 March 1978		
13	Denisa Çarçani	28 September 1975		
16	Jonida Sallaku	19 December 1980		
17	Geralda Neli	3 February 1982		
18	Rubena Sukaj	8 July 1987		

== Croatia ==
No.	Name	Date of birth	Position	Club
-	Ivica Jelić		coach	
2	Antonija Kaleb	2 April 1986		
3	Zrinka Zuanović	14 September 1978		
5	Mirela Delić	13 November 1981	middle blocker	(Croatia) Mladost Zagabria
6	Senna Ušić	14 May 1986	outside hitter	(Croatia) OK Velika Gorica
7	Marina Katić	1 October 1983	setter	(France) RC Villebon 91
9	Ilijana Dugandžić	17 April 1981	middle blocker	(Croatia) Mladost Zagabria
10	Sanja Popović	31 May 1984	opposite	(Croatia) Mladost Zagabria
11	Katarina Barun	1 December 1983	outside hitter	(Croatia) Mladost Zagabria
12	Vesna Jelić	22 March 1982		
14	Patricia Daničić	21 April 1978		
16	Mia Jerkov	5 December 1982	opposite	(Russia) Uraločka NTMK
17	Diana Reščić	2 February 1986	setter	

== France ==
No.	Name	Date of birth	Position	Club
-	Yan Sanchez	4 August 1967	coach	
2	Séverine Liénard	19 February 1979	outside hitter	(France) Gazélec Béziers
3	Pauline Soullard	24 April 1985	middle blocker	(France) VBC Riom
4	Leslie Turiaf	15 May 1986	outside hitter	(France) IFVB Tolosa
6	Audrey Syren	4 September 1983	setter	(France) RC Villebon 91
7	Anna Rybaczewski	23 March 1982	outside hitter	(France) La Rochette Volley
8	Coralie Larnack	22 October 1982	middle blocker	(France) ASPTT Mulhouse
9	Corinne Cardassay	25 July 1975	middle blocker	(Belgium) Datovoc Tongeren
10	Stéphanie Volle	10 May 1979	setter	(France) Gazélec Béziers
11	Valeria Paofaï-Vaki	25 November 1985	outside hitter	(France) Istres Volley-Ball
12	Anne Andrieux	21 April 1979	outside hitter	(France) USSP Albi
13	Jenifer Marechal	7 May 1984	outside hitter	(France) Gazélec Béziers
17	Alexandra Rochelle	14 December 1983	libero	(France) USSP Albi

== Greece ==
No.	Name	Date of birth	Position	Club
-	Dimitrios Andreopoulos		coach	
1	Maria Plagiannakou	12 April 1978		
3	Eleni Fragkiadaki	23 June 1982		
4	Nikoletta Koutouxidou	10 January 1980	setter	
5	Evangelia Chatziefraimoglou	29 April 1975		
6	Eleni Koiosi'	27 February 1985		
7	Elpida Tiktapanidou	18 November 1982		
8	Charikleia Sakkoula	18 December 1973	outside hitter	
9	Rouxantra-Kon Ntoumitrskou	20 April 1977		
10	Ioanna Vlachou	14 May 1981	libero	
13	Vaia Dirva	22 April 1977	middle blocker	
15	Georgia Tzanakaki	1 December 1980	middle blocker	
18	Maria Chatzinikolaou	30 September 1978	middle blocker	

== Italy ==
No.	Name	Date of birth	Position	Club
-	Marco Mencarelli	23 February 1963	coach	
1	Lucia Bacchi	4 January 1981	outside hitter	(Italy) Curtatone Volley
2	Valentina Arrighetti	26 January 1985	middle blocker	(Italy) Volley Cavazzale
3	Giulia Rondon	16 October 1987	setter	(Italy) Esperia Cremona
4	Marianna Masoni	25 March 1986	outside hitter	(Italy) Volley 2002 Forlì
5	Chiara Dall'Ora	11 January 1983	middle blocker	(Italy) VC Padova
7	Manuela Caponi	20 July 1979	middle blocker	(Italy) Airone Tortolì
8	Valentina Borrelli	30 October 1978	outside hitter	(Italy) Vicenza Volley
9	Chiara Di Iulio	5 May 1985	outside hitter	(Italy) Sirio Perugia
10	Giulia Pincerato	16 March 1987	setter	(Italy) VC Padova
13	Chiara Negrini	27 April 1979	outside hitter	(Italy) Volley Castelfidardo
16	Raffaella Calloni	4 May 1983	middle blocker	(Italy) FV Busto Arsizio
17	Ramona Puerari	7 April 1983	libero	(Italy) Robursport Pesaro

== Spain ==
No.	Name	Date of birth	Position	Club
-	Aurelio Ureña		coach	
1	Elena García	12 August 1979	middle blocker	(Spain) CV Benidorm
3	Ana Ramírez	4 November 1981	libero	
4	Maria Teresa Martin	31 March 1981	outside hitter	
5	Sara Pérez	29 November 1980		(Spain) CD Ávila Vóley
7	Amaranta Fernández	11 August 1983	middle blocker	(Spain) CV Albacete
8	Yasmina Hernández	24 April 1984	opposite	(Spain) Aguere S. Cristóbal
9	Lucía Paraja	10 February 1983	middle blocker	(Spain) CV Benidorm
12	Patricia Aranda	27 June 1979	setter	
13	Diana Castaño	5 April 1983	libero	
15	Silvia Fernández	21 March 1979	outside hitter	
16	Sara González	16 November 1984	middle blocker	
17	Arkía El-Ammari	9 October 1976	outside hitter	

== Turkey ==
No.	Name	Date of birth	Position	Club
-	Reşat Yazıcıoğulları		coach	
1	Bahar Mert	13 December 1975	setter	(Turkey) Eczacıbaşı Istanbul
2	Gülden Kayalar	5 December 1980	libero	(Turkey) Eczacıbaşı Istanbul
4	Özlem İşseven	1 January 1972	middle blocker	(Turkey) Eczacıbaşı Istanbul
5	Aysun Özbek	18 March 1977	middle blocker	(Turkey) VakıfGüneş Istanbul
6	Duygu Sipahioğlu	31 October 1979	middle blocker	(Turkey) Beşiktaş JK
7	Natalia Hanikoğlu	23 May 1975	outside hitter	(Russia) Zareč'e Odincovo
9	Deniz Hakyemez	3 February 1983	outside hitter	(Turkey) Beşiktaş JK
14	Elif Ağca	10 February 1984	setter	(Turkey) VakıfGüneş Istanbul
16	Seda Tokatlıoğlu	26 June 1986	opposite	(Turkey) İller Bankası Ankara
17	Neslihan Demir	9 December 1983	opposite	(Turkey) VakıfGüneş Istanbul
18	Gözde Kırdar	26 June 1985	outside hitter	(Turkey) VakıfGüneş Istanbul
