= Saskia Hippe =

German volleyball player (born 1991)

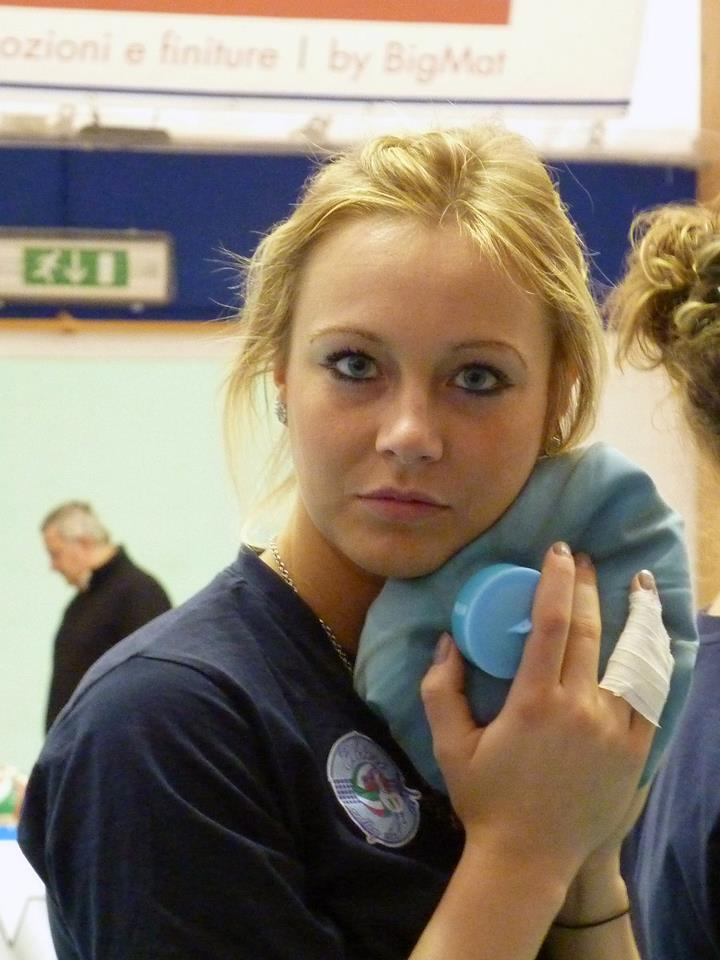
- Hippe in 2012

Personal information
- Nickname: Sassi
- Nationality: Germany
- Born: 16 January 1991 (age 35) Berlin, Germany
- Height: 1.86 m (6 ft 1 in)
- Weight: 76 kg (168 lb)
- Spike: 305 cm (120 in)
- Block: 296 cm (117 in)

Volleyball information
- Position: Opposite
- Current club: Milon Nea Smyrni
- Number: 15 (Club), 13 (National team)

Career
- Years: Team
- 2002–2008 2008–2011 2011–2012 2012–2013 2013–2015 2015–2016 2016–2021 2021 2021–2022 2022–2023 2023 2023–2024 2024: (Germany) Köpenicker SC (Germany) Dresdner SC (Italy) Chieri Torino (Czech Republic) VK Prostějov (Germany) Schweriner SC (Germany) SC Potsdam (Greece) Olympiacos Piraeus (Italy) Volley Brescia (Greece) Olympiacos Piraeus (Romania) SCO Voluntari (United States) Dallas AU (United States) Vegas Thrill (Greece) Milon Nea Smyrni

National team
- Years: Team
- –: Germany - 112 caps (04.2017)
Medal record
Women's volleyball
Representing Germany
European Championship
Silver medal – second place	2011 Italy / Serbia	Team
Silver medal – second place	2013 Germany	Team

Saskia Hippe (born 16 January 1991) is a German volleyball player. She was a member of the Germany women's national volleyball team. She was at club level after six years competing in the Hellenic Volley League with Olympiacos Piraeus. in the 2023–24 season she plays in the US Pro League for the Vegas Thrill. For the first round of 2024–25 season she agreed to play for Milon Nea Smyrni in Hellenic Volley League.

== Career ==
In 2000, at nine years old, she joined the junior teams of the Berlin club Köppenicker SC, with which she later signed her first professional contract in 2007. The following year (2008), she joined the German volleyball club Dresdner SC, with which she won the CEV Challenge Cup and the German Cup in 2010.

In the Summer of 2011 she decided to go abroad, playing in the Italian Town of Chieri, in Turin. The following year, she travelled to the Czech Republic for VK Prostějov, with which she won the Czech double in 2012–13 season. In 2013 she returned to the German Schweriner SC, but an injury forced her to miss the 2013–14 season. She remained in Schwerin's team until 2015 without winning a title, when she moved to SK Potsdam.

In the Summer of 2016, Saskia Hippe joined Olympiacos Piraeus in one of the biggest transfers in the history of the club's women's volleyball department. With Olympiakos, Hippe won the Hellenic Championship and the Hellenic Cup in the 2016–17 season. She was one of the key members of the red-white team in winning the Silver Medal of the CEV Challenge Cup of the same period, and renewed her contract with the Piraeus team for another season.

However her most successful year was the 2017–18 season. Domestically, she won both the Hellenic Cup and Championship, in which Olympiacos finished undefeated, and she was named MVP in both competitions. In the European scene, she participated in the conquest of the CEV Challenge Cup by the red-whites, with the epic victory of Olympiacos Piraeus in the second final in Bursa, emerging as the top scorer and best striker of the entire competition, with 207 and 173 points respectively. In May 2018, she renewed her contract with the Piraeus team, and then won two more Hellenic championships in the 2018–19 and 2019–20 seasons as well as the 2019 Hellenic Cup.

In January 2021, due to the COVID-19 pandemic, the Hellenic Championship was suspended and there was uncertainty as to when and if it would resume. Olympiacos allowed players to continue the season in teams abroad, and Saskia Hipe signed with the Italian Volley Brescia, where she remained until the end of the season, when she returned to Piraeus together with Katerina Giota and Stella Christodoulou, who had also left for the same reasons. At the end of the 2021–22 season, Saskia Hipe's collaboration with the Piraeus team came to the end.

Olympiakos Piraeus said goodbye to its six-year athlete with the following announcement:
"All good things come to an end. But what we lived together in these 6 years, will never be erased. With all the honours befitting her career and ethos, Olympiacos say goodbye to the German from... Piraeus, Saskia Hipe!
An athlete who honoured from the first moment to the last, both Olympiakos and Greece which she loved and was loved by.
There are many highlights that can be included in the album of memories, but we will never forget her dedication, her fighting spirit and her passion, which made her a part of the unattainable History of our club.
Thank you Saskia!"

For the 2022–23 season, Saskia chose to continue her career in the Romanian S.C.O. Volundari, with which she won the silver medal in the Romanian Super Cup. In October 2023 she moved to the USA, initially to Athletes Unlimited of Dallas, where she stayed for a short time, and from November 2023 she joined the Vegas Thrill of Las Vegas.

In July 2024, with the permission of Vegas Thrill, she agreed to fight with AONS Milon in the first round of the Hellenic Volley League, at the Nea Smyrni team's first appearance in the top Hellenic division.

== International career ==
Saskia Hippe began her international career with Germany's youth national teams, where she made several appearances. In 2007 she won the Golden Medal with the Youth (U17) team of the corresponding European Championship. From 2011 to 2017 she was a key member of the German women's national team, making 122 appearances (04.2017). With her country's representative team, she has won the Golden Medal at the 2013 European League and three silver medals at the 2011, and 2013 Women's European Volleyball Championship, as well as the 2014 European League. She was also a member of the team that qualified for the 2018 World Championship.

== Sporting achievements ==
=== National team ===
- 2007 Women's European U18 Championship
- 2011 Women's European Volleyball Championship (Serbia / Italy)
- 2013 Women's European Volleyball League (Varna, Bulgaria)
- 2013 Women's European Volleyball Championship (Germany / Switzerland)
- 2014 Women's European Volleyball League (Bursa, Turkey and Rüsselsheim, Germany)

=== Clubs ===
==== International competitions ====
- 2010 CEV Women's Challenge Cup, with Dresdner SC
- 2017 CEV Women's Challenge Cup, with Olympiacos Piraeus
- 2018 CEV Women's Challenge Cup, with Olympiacos Piraeus

==== National championships ====
- 2012/2013 Czech Championship, with VK Prostějov
- 2016/2017 Hellenic Championship, with Olympiacos Piraeus
- 2017/2018 Hellenic Championship, with Olympiacos Piraeus
- 2018/2019 Hellenic Championship, with Olympiacos Piraeus
- 2019/2020 Hellenic Championship, with Olympiacos Piraeus

==== National trophies ====
- 2009/2010 German Cup, with Dresdner SC
- 2012/2013 Czech Cup, with VK Prostějov
- 2016/2017 Hellenic Cup, with Olympiacos Piraeus
- 2017/2018 Hellenic Cup, with Olympiacos Piraeus
- 2018/2019 Hellenic Cup, with Olympiacos Piraeus

=== Individuals ===
- 2010 CEV Women's Challenge Cup Final four M.V.P., with Dresdner SC
- 2015/2016 Top scorer in German Championship - 511 points, with SC Podsdam
- 2015/2016 Second best Opposite in German Championship, with SC Podsdam
- 2017 Challenge Cup Top scorer (171 points), with Olympiacos Piraeus
- 2017 Challenge Cup Best attacker (145 points), with Olympiacos Piraeus
- 2017 Challenge Cup Best server (17 aces), with Olympiacos Piraeus
- 2018 Hellenic Cup Final four M.V.P., with Olympiacos Piraeus
- 2017/2018 Hellenic Championship M.V.P., with Olympiacos Piraeus
- 2018 Challenge Cup Top scorer (207 points), with Olympiacos Piraeus
- 2018 Challenge Cup Best attacker (173 points), with Olympiacos Piraeus
- 2018 Challenge Cup Best server (24 aces), with Olympiacos Piraeus
