= Tzina Lamprousi =

Greek volleyball player

Personal information
- Full name: Georgia Lamprousi
- Nationality: Greece
- Born: January 27, 1993 (age 33) Athens, Greece
- Height: 1.84 m (6 ft 0 in)
- Weight: 67 kg (148 lb)
- Spike: 287 cm (113 in)
- Block: 279 cm (110 in)

Volleyball information
- Position: Middle blocker
- Current club: (Greece) Panionios GSS
- Number: 7 (club and national team)

Career
- Years: Team
- 2008–2013 2013–2020 2020–2022 2022–12.22 01.23–2025 2025–: (Greece) Iraklis Kifisia (Athens) (Greece) Olympiacos Piraeus (France) ASPTT Mulhouse (Romania) CSM Târgoviște (Greece) Olympiacos S.F. Piraeus (Greece) Panionios GSS

National team
- Years: Team
- –: (Greece) Hellas - 76 caps (05.2018)
- Updated on 5 May 2025

Tzina (Georgia) Lamprousi (Greek: Τζίνα Λαμπρούση; born January 27, 1993, in Athens) is a female professional volleyball player from Greece, who is a member of the Greece women's national volleyball team. At club level, she plays in Hellenic Volley League for Panionios GSS

== Career ==
Tzina (Georgia) Lamprousi, originating from Assos Preveza, began the sport at a young age. She began in 2002 with Aerobic gymnastics, and was a member of the Hellenic national team. After six years she was forced to leave this sport because of her height, and at the instigation of the coaches of the sports high school where she was studying, started playing volleyball. In 2008, at the age of 15, she became a member of the Junior team of Iraklis Kifisia (Hellenic 1st division club), and a few months later was a member of the Hellenic National Junior Team. In the 2008–09 season she won with Iraklis, the Hellenic Girls Championship and in 2010–11, the Hellenic Junior Women Championship. Gradually she was promoted to the first team of Iraklis, participating in the Hellenic Women's 1st division Championship.

In the summer of 2013, Tzina Lamprousi moved to the Greek Olympiacos Piraeus team. With Olympiacos Lamprousi, she has won 6 Hellenic Championships, 6 Hellenic Cups, the silver medal of the 2016–17 CEV Women's Challenge Cup and the golden medal of the 2017–18 CEV Women's Challenge Cup, with 22 winning block points in the whole competition, being a permanent member of her squad as central blocker.

=== International career ===
In 2009, at the age of 16 Tzina Lamprousi, was selected for the Hellenic Junior Women's National team and competed in the preliminary round of the relative European Championship. In the Hellenic Women's National Team debuted in the preliminary round of the 2011 European Championship, and since thenis a basic member of the National Squad, having participated in the Mediterranean Games of 2013, and other competitions, such as the preliminary rounds of the European and World Championships, in the European League and in many friendly matches as well. In the 2018 Mediterranean Games she won the silver medal as a permanent member of the Hellenic National Team. In 2019, she competed with the Hellenic National Team in the final phase of the European Championship, participating in all 6 games for Greece.

== Sporting achievements ==
=== National team ===
- 2010 Balkan Junior Women's Championship
- 2018 Mediterranean Games

=== Clubs ===
==== International competitions ====
- 2016/2017: CEV Women's Challenge Cup, with Olympiacos Piraeus
- 2017/2018: CEV Women's Challenge Cup, with Olympiacos Piraeus

==== National championships ====
- 2011/2012 Hellenic Championship, with Iraklis Kifisia
- 2012/2013 Hellenic Championship, with raklis Kifisia
- 2013/2014 Hellenic Championship, with Olympiacos Piraeus
- 2014/2015 Hellenic Championship, with Olympiacos Piraeus
- 2015/2016 Hellenic Championship, with Olympiacos Piraeus
- 2016/2017 Hellenic Championship, with Olympiacos Piraeus
- 2017/2018 Hellenic Championship, with Olympiacos Piraeus
- 2018/2019 Hellenic Championship, with Olympiacos Piraeus
- 2019/2020 Hellenic Championship, with Olympiacos Piraeus
- 2020/2021 French Championship, with ASPTT Mulhouse
- 2021/2022 French Championship, with ASPTT Mulhouse
- 2022/2023 Hellenic Championship, with Olympiacos Piraeus
- 2023/2024 Hellenic Championship, with Olympiacos Piraeus
- 2024/2025 Hellenic Championship, with Olympiacos Piraeus

==== National trophies ====
- 2013/2014 Hellenic Cup, with Olympiacos Piraeus
- 2014/2015 Hellenic Cup, with Olympiacos Piraeus
- 2015/2016 Hellenic Cup, with Olympiacos Piraeus
- 2016/2017 Hellenic Cup, with Olympiacos Piraeus
- 2017/2018 Hellenic Cup, with Olympiacos Piraeus
- 2018/2019 Hellenic Cup, with Olympiacos Piraeus
- 2020/2021 French Cup, with ASPTT Mulhouse
- 2020/2021 French Super cup, with ASPTT Mulhouse
- 2023/2024 Hellenic Cup, with Olympiacos Piraeus
- 2024 Hellenic Super Cup, with Olympiacos Piraeus
- 2024/2025 Hellenic Cup, with Olympiacos Piraeus

=== Individuals ===
- 2015/16 Hellenic Cup: MVP
- 2016/17 Hellenic Championship: Best player - Best middle blocker
