= Branko Kovačević (volleyball) =

Serbian volleyball coach (born 1967)

Personal information
- Nationality: Serbian
- Born: February 27, 1967 (age 59)

Volleyball information
- Position: Head coach
- Current club: (Greece) Olympiacos Piraeus

Career
Years
- 2014–2015
- 2015-2020
Teams
- (Serbia) OK Crvena Zvezda
- (Greece) Olympiacos Piraeus
Honours
Assistant Coach for Women's Volleyball
Serbia
Olympic Games
Silver medal – second place	2016 Rio de Janeiro	Team
- Last updated: June 30, 2017

Branko Kovačević (Serbian Cyrillic: Бранко Ковачевић, born 27 February 1967) is a Serbian volleyball coach. He is currently the head coach of Olympiacos Piraeus women's volleyball team and the assistant coach of Serbia women's national volleyball team.

== International career ==
Branko Kovačević was the assistant coach of the Serbian women's national volleyball team who won the Olympic silver medal at Rio 2016, and the 2011 CEV Volleyball European Championship at Belgrade as well.

== Club career ==
Under his guidance, Olympiacos Piraeus have won 3 Hellenic Championships (2015–16, 2016–17, 2017-18), 3 Hellenic Cups (2016, 2017, 2018) and the CEV Women's Challenge Cup in 2017–18. The Piraeus team also reached the final of the same competition in 2016–17.

== Honours ==
=== Head coach ===
==== European ====
CEV Women's Challenge Cup

- Winner: 2017-18 with Olympiacos Piraeus
- Runner-up: 2016-17 with Olympiacos Piraeus

==== Domestic ====
- 2015/2016 Hellenic Championship (Women's), with Olympiacos Piraeus
- 2016/2017 Hellenic Championship (Women's), with Olympiacos Piraeus
- 2017/2018 Hellenic Championship (Women's), with Olympiacos Piraeus
- 2018/2019 Hellenic Championship (Women's), with Olympiacos Piraeus
- 2015/2016 Hellenic Cup (Women's), with Olympiacos Piraeus
- 2016/2017 Hellenic Cup (Women's), with Olympiacos Piraeus
- 2017/2018 Hellenic Cup (Women's), with Olympiacos Piraeus
- 2018/2019 Hellenic Cup (Women's), with Olympiacos Piraeus

=== Assistant coach ===
- 2016 Olympic Games - Silver Medal
- 2011 Women's European Volleyball Championship - Golden Medal
