= Athanasia Totsidou =

Greek volleyball player (born 1989)

Personal information
- Full name: Athanasia Totsidou
- Nationality: Greece
- Born: June 19, 1989 (age 37); Munich, Germany
- Height: 1.78 m (5 ft 10 in)
- Weight: 65 kg (143 lb)
- Spike: 286 cm (113 in)
- Block: 280 cm (110 in)

Volleyball information
- Position: Outside hitter - Libero
- Current club: (Greece) Filathliticos G.S. Preveza
- Number: 13 (club and national team)

Career
Years	Teams
2001–2003; 2003–2009; 2009–2011; 2011–2012; 2012–2014; 2014–2017; 2017–2018; 2018–2019; 2019–2022; 2022–	(Greece) Doxa Drama (Greece) Ermis Drama (Greece) Iraklis Thessaloniki (Greece) Pannaxiakos Naxos (Greece) AEK Athens (Greece) Pannaxiakos Naxos (Greece) GS Ilioupolis Athens (Greece) AEK Athens (Greece) Olympiacos S.F. Piraeus (Greece) Filathliticos G.S. Preveza

National team
(Greece) Hellas - 11 caps (05.2018)
Honours
Women's volleyball
Representing (Greece) Hellas
Mediterranean Games
Silver medal – second place	2018 Tarragona	Team
- Last updated: 20 November 2023

Athanasia Totsidou (Greek: Αθανασία Τοτσίδου; born 19 June 1989) is a Greek professional volleyball player, who was a member of the Greece women's national volleyball team. At club level, she plays in Hellenic Pre League for Filathliticos Grevena since 2022.

== Sporting achievements ==
=== National team ===
- 2018 Mediterranean Games

=== Clubs ===
==== National championships ====
- 2012/2013 2nd place in Hellenic Championship, with AEK Athens
- 2013/2014 2nd place in Hellenic Championship, with AEK Athens
- 2014/2015 3rd place in Hellenic Championship, with Pannaxiakos A.O. Naxos
- 2016/2017 2nd place in Hellenic Championship, with Pannaxiakos A.O. Naxos
- 2019/2020 Hellenic Championship, with Olympiacos Piraeus
- 2021/2022 2nd place in Hellenic Championship, with Olympiacos Piraeus

==== National trophies ====
- 2012 Hellenic Super Cup, with AEK Athens
- 2012/2013 Runners up in Hellenic Cup, with AEK Athens
- 2016/2017 Runners up in Hellenic Cup, with Pannaxiakos A.O. Naxos

=== Individuals ===
- 2012/13 Hellenic Championship - 2nd day: MVP
- 2016/17 Hellenic Championship - 13th day: MVP
- 2017/18 Hellenic Championship - 2nd day: MVP
