= Areta Konomi =

Greek volleyball player (born 1989)

Personal information
- Nationality: Greece
- Born: January 31, 1989 (age 37); Tirana, Albania
- Height: 1.64 m (5 ft 5 in)
- Weight: 55 kg (121 lb)
- Spike: 240 cm (94 in)
- Block: 235 cm (93 in)

Volleyball information
- Position: Libero
- Number: 10 (club and national team)

Career
| Years | Teams |
|---|---|
| 2000–2007; 2007–2012; 2012–2021 | (Greece) G.S. Petroupoli (Greece) A.O Markopoulo (Greece) Olympiacos Piraeus |

National team
| (Greece) Hellas > 13 caps |
- Last updated: 12 June 2023

Areta Konomi (Greek: Αρέτα Κονόμη; born January 31, 1989) is a Greek retired volleyball player, who was a member of the Greece women's national volleyball team. She became a well-known competitor with Hellenic powerhouse Olympiacos Piraeus. As a member of the Piraeus club, she won the Golden Metal of CEV Women's Challenge Cup in the 2018 edition. She is of Albanian origin.

== Sporting achievements ==
=== Clubs ===
==== International competitions ====
- 2016/2017: CEV Women's Challenge Cup, with Olympiacos Piraeus
- 2017/2018: CEV Women's Challenge Cup, with Olympiacos Piraeus

=== National championships ===
- 2012/2013 Hellenic Championship, with Olympiacos Piraeus
- 2013/2014 Hellenic Championship, with Olympiacos Piraeus
- 2014/2015 Hellenic Championship, with Olympiacos Piraeus
- 2015/2016 Hellenic Championship, with Olympiacos Piraeus
- 2016/2017 Hellenic Championship, with Olympiacos Piraeus
- 2017/2018 Hellenic Championship, with Olympiacos Piraeus
- 2018/2019 Hellenic Championship, with Olympiacos Piraeus
- 2019/2020 Hellenic Championship, with Olympiacos Piraeus

=== National cups ===
- 2012/2013 Hellenic Cup, with Olympiacos Piraeus
- 2013/2014 Hellenic Cup, with Olympiacos Piraeus
- 2014/2015 Hellenic Cup, with Olympiacos Piraeus
- 2015/2016 Hellenic Cup, with Olympiacos Piraeus
- 2016/2017 Hellenic Cup, with Olympiacos Piraeus
- 2017/2018 Hellenic Cup, with Olympiacos Piraeus
- 2018/2019 Hellenic Cup, with Olympiacos Piraeus
- 2007/2008 Hellenic Cup, with A.O Markopoulo

=== Individuals ===
- 2013/2014 Hellenic Championship - 17th day: MVP
- 2013/2014 Hellenic Championship MVP
- 2014/2015 Women's CEV Cup Best receiver
- 2014/2015 Hellenic Championship - Main period: Hellenic League All stars squad
