= Chara Papadopoulou =

Greek volleyball player (born 1996)

Personal information
- Nationality: Greece
- Born: December 9, 1996 (age 29); Athens, Greece
- Height: 1.75 m (5 ft 9 in)

Volleyball information
- Position: Setter
- Current club: (Austria) ATSC Kelag Wildcats
- Number: 8

Career
Years	Teams
2013–2014; 2014–2017; 2017–2018; 2018–2019; 2019–2020; 2020-	(Greece) Iraklis Ioannina (Greece) Panathinaikos Athens (Greece) Olympiacos S.F. Piraeus (Greece) Ilisiakos A.O. Athens (Greece) Pannaxiakos V.C. (Austria) ATSC Kelag Wildcats

National team
(Greece) Hellas - 9 caps (09.2018)
- Last updated: 25 August 2021

Chara Papadopoulou (Greek: Χαρά Παπαδοπούλου; born December 9, 1996, in Athens, Greece) is a female professional volleyball player from Greece, who is a member of the Greece women's national volleyball team. At club level, she plays for Austrian club ATSC Kelag Wildcats.

== Sporting achievements ==
=== Clubs ===
==== International competitions ====
- 2017/2018: CEV Women's Challenge Cup, with Olympiacos S.F. Piraeus

==== National championships ====
- 2017/2018 Hellenic Championship, with Olympiacos Piraeus

=== National cups ===
- 2017/2018 Hellenic Cup, with Olympiacos Piraeus
