= Katerina Giota =

Greek volleyball player

Personal information
- Full name: Aikaterini Giota
- Nationality: Greece
- Born: July 3, 1990 (age 36); St. Petersburg, Russia
- Height: 1.84 m (6 ft 0 in)
- Weight: 73 kg (161 lb)
- Spike: 287 cm (113 in)
- Block: 282 cm (111 in)

Volleyball information
- Position: Middle Blocker
- Current club: (Greece) G.S. Iraklis Kifisia (Athens)
- Number: 1 (club and national team)

Career
Years	Teams
2004–2006; 2006–2008; 2008–2013; 2013–2021; 2021–2021; 2021–2023; 2023–2024; 2024–	(Greece) G.S. Grevena (Greece) A.S. Aris Thessaloniki (Greece) G.S. Iraklis Kifisia (Athens) (Greece) Olympiacos Piraeus (Hungary) Vasas SC Budapest (Greece) Olympiacos Piraeus (Greece) AEK Athens (Greece) G.S. Iraklis Kifisia (Athens)

National team
(Greece) Hellas - 93 caps (05.2018)
Medal record
Women's volleyball
Representing Greece
European League
Bronze medal – third place	2015	Team
Bronze medal – third place	2016	Team
Mediterranean Games
Silver medal – second place	2018 / Tarragona	Team
- Last updated: 21 August 2024

Katerina Giota (Greek: Κατερίνα Γιώτα; born July 3, 1990, in St. Petersburg, Russia) is a Greek professional volleyball player. She previously played on the Hellenic women's national team. At club level, she plays in Hellenic Pre League (2nd level) for G.S. Iraklis Kifisia since May 2024.

== Career ==
Katerina Giota in 2002 moved with her mother from Russia to Greece at an age of 12 years old and they were established in the Greek city Grevena, where she obtained the Hellenic citizenship. From her younger age, she was engaged in swimming, so she continued in Greece, but some day she was spotted by coach Memtsas and was persuaded to try volleyball. In this way she started her rich career in volleyball, which was to lead her into one of the best ever central blockers in the history of the certain sport in Greece.

Thus in 2004 she joined G.S. Grevena, a club of her hometown, where she remained up to 2006 when she removed to 1st division A.S. Aris Thessaloniki. Two more years in Aris until her transfer to G.S. Iraklis Kifisia. With this club Katerina Giota won twice the 3rd place of the Hellenic Championship.

In 2013 Olympiacos managed to convince Katerina Giota to be a member of the Piraeus club, after three failed attempts. Until then Giota used to wear her favourite No 13 on her shirt, in every of her previous teams. But in her new club she was told that this number does not exist in any of Olympiacos sport sections, as it represents their hot rivals from Athens. So, Katerina Giota chose the No 1 shirt, and kept the No 13 only for the Hellenic National Squad.

Since then Katerina Giota has won at international level with Olympiacos Piraeus the golden medal of the 2017–18 CEV Women's Challenge Cup, being the best blocker of that competition with 33 winning block points and the silver medal of the 2016–17 CEV Women's Challenge Cup as well.
In domestic competitions, Giota has won 7 Hellenic Championships and 6 Hellenic Cups, being all these years a permanent member of her squad as central blocker.

In January 2021 the Greek championship was uncertain whether it would continue due to COVID-19 disease, and Olympiacos allowed their players to move abroad (despite their contracts) until next summer. Thus, Katerina Giota signed in Vasas SC Budapest, with which she won the 3rd place of the Hungarian championship 2020–21. She returned to her beloved Olympiacos Piraeus, where she stayed for two seasons, twice winning second place in the Hellenic League and in the summer of 2023 she signed with AEK Athens, as the then coach of the Piraeus team, Lorenzo Miceli, decided that she could no longer help the red and white team.
In May 2024, Katerina Giota joined Iraklis Kifisias, the team in which she emerged as one of the greatest talents of her time, a fact confirmed by her title-filled career.

=== International career ===
In 2006, at the age of 16 Katerina Giota, when she was playing for Aris Thessaloniki, was selected for the Hellenic Junior Women's National team, but her first European appearance took place in the preliminary round of the 2008 Junior Women European Championship.

Since 2010 she is a member of the Hellenic Women's National Team with participation in the preliminary round of the 2011 European Championship, and she remains a basic member of the National Squad up to now, having competed in the Mediterranean Games of 2013 and 2018, as well as in any other competition, such as the preliminary or final stages of European and World Championships, in the European League and in many friendlies as well. In 2015 and in 2016 Katerina Giota won the bronze medal in Golden European League, and in 2018 Mediterranean Games she won the silver medal as a permanent member of the Hellenic National Team.

== Sporting achievements ==
=== National team ===
- 2015 European Golden League
- 2016 European Golden League
- 2018 Mediterranean Games

=== Clubs ===
==== International competitions ====
- 2016/2017 CEV Women's Challenge Cup, with Olympiacos S.F. Piraeus
- 2017/2018 CEV Women's Challenge Cup, with Olympiacos S.F. Piraeus

==== National championships ====
- 2011/2012 Hellenic Championship, with Iraklis Kifisia
- 2012/2013 Hellenic Championship, with Iraklis Kifisia
- 2013/2014 Hellenic Championship, with Olympiacos Piraeus
- 2014/2015 Hellenic Championship, with Olympiacos Piraeus
- 2015/2016 Hellenic Championship, with Olympiacos Piraeus
- 2016/2017 Hellenic Championship, with Olympiacos Piraeus
- 2017/2018 Hellenic Championship, with Olympiacos Piraeus
- 2018/2019 Hellenic Championship, with Olympiacos Piraeus
- 2019/2020 Hellenic Championship, with Olympiacos Piraeus
- 2020/2021 Vasas Budapest
- 2021/2022 Hellenic Championship, with Olympiacos Piraeus
- 2022/2023 Hellenic Championship, with Olympiacos Piraeus

==== National trophies ====
- 2013/2014 Hellenic Cup, with Olympiacos Piraeus
- 2014/2015 Hellenic Cup, with Olympiacos Piraeus
- 2015/2016 Hellenic Cup, with Olympiacos Piraeus
- 2016/2017 Hellenic Cup, with Olympiacos Piraeus
- 2017/2018 Hellenic Cup, with Olympiacos Piraeus
- 2018/2019 Hellenic Cup, with Olympiacos Piraeus
- 2023/2024 Hellenic Cup, with AEK Athens

=== Individuals ===
- 2015/16 Hellenic Championship - Main period: MVP
- 2014/15 Hellenic Championship - Main period: League All stars squad
- 2012/13 Hellenic Championship - 4th day: MVP
- 2014/15 Hellenic Championship - 21st day: MVP
- 2016/17 Hellenic Championship - 12th day: MVP
- 2017/18 CEV Women's Challenge Cup: Best blocker
- 2023/24 Hellenic Championship - 10th day: MVP
