= Konstantinidou =

Konstantinidou is a surname. Notable people with the surname include:

- Xanthi Konstantinidou
- Georgia Konstantinidou
- Kyriaki Konstantinidou
- Aliki Konstantinidou
