= Tenev =

Tenev (Bulgarian: Тенев), feminine: Teneva, is a Bulgarian patronymic surname. Notable people with the surname include:

- Atanaska Teneva (born 1967), Bulgarian educator, politician (M.P.) and statesman
- Florencio Tenev (1939–1999), Argentine lawyer and politician, governor of the province of Chaco (1983–1987)
- Georgi Tenev (born 1969), Bulgarian writer
- Plamen Tenev (born 1995), Bulgarian footballer
- Pravoslav Tenev, Bulgarian infantry general
- Radosveta Teneva (born 1980), Bulgarian volleyball player
- Tencho Tenev (born 1955), Bulgarian football manager
- Vlad Tenev (born 1987), Bulgaria-born American entrepreneur
