= Gabriela Tsvetanova =

Bulgarian volleyball player (born 1991)

Personal information
- Nationality: Bulgaria
- Born: 11 April 1991 (age 35); Sofia
- Height: 1.85 m (6 ft 1 in)
- Weight: 72 kg (159 lb)
- Spike: 305 cm (120 in)
- Block: 298 cm (117 in)

Volleyball information
- Position: Opposite
- Current club: (Bulgaria) VK Maritsa Plovdiv
- Number: 19

Career
Years	Teams
2008-2009	(Bulgaria) CSKA Sofia
2009-2009	(Bulgaria) Levski Sofia
2009-2011	(Bulgaria) CSKA Sofia
2011-2014	(Romania) CSU Targu Mures
2014-2015	(Greece) Pannaxiacos A.O. Naxos
2015-2016	(Greece) Olympiacos Piraeus
2016-2018	(Bulgaria) VK Maritsa Plovdiv

National team
Bulgaria

Gabriela Tsvetanova (Bulgarian: Габриела Цветанова, born 11 April 1991) is a Bulgarian female volleyball player. She is part of the Bulgaria women's national volleyball team. At slub level she plays as opposite for VK Maritsa Plovdiv (2017-2018).

== Sporting achievements ==
=== Clubs ===
==== National championships ====
- 2007/2008 Bulgarian Championship, with CSKA Sofia
- 2009/2010 Bulgarian Championship, with CSKA Sofia
- 2010/2011 Bulgarian Championship, with CSKA Sofia
- 2014/2015 3rd place in Hellenc Championship, with Pannaxiacos A.O. Naxos
- 2015/2016 Hellenc Championship, with Olympiacos Piraeus

==== National trophies ====
- 2007/2008 Bulgarian Cup, with CSKA Sofia
- 2008/2009 Bulgarian Cup Runners up, with CSKA Sofia
- 2009/2010 Bulgarian Cup, with CSKA Sofia
- 2010/2011 Bulgarian Cup, with CSKA Sofia
- 2015/2016 Hellenic Cup, with Olympiacos Piraeus
- 2016/2017 Bulgarian Cup, with VK Maritsa Plovdiv

=== Individuals ===
- 2015-16 Best Opposite in Hellenc Championship, with Pannaxiacos A.O. Naxos
