= Kokkinakis =

Kokkinakis (Greek: Κοκκινάκης), feminine form Kokkinaki (Κοκκινάκη), is a Greek surname. In Russia, Kokkinaki is also a masculine surname. Notable people with the surname include:

- Dimitrios Kokkinakis
- Eirini Kokkinaki (born 1996), Greek volleyball player
- Konstantinos Kokkinakis (born 1975), Greek water polo player
- Menelaos Kokkinakis (born 1993), Greek volleyball player
- Minos Kokkinakis, Greek member of Jehovah's Witnesses notable for his clashes with Greece's ban on proselytism
- Thanasi Kokkinakis (born 1996), Australian tennis player
