= Katerina Zakchaiou =

Cypriot volleyball player

Personal information
- Nationality: Cyprus
- Born: July 26, 1998 (age 28); Limassol, Cyprus
- Height: 1.92 m (6 ft 4 in)

Volleyball information
- Position: Middle blocker
- Current club: Pro Victoria Monza

Career
Years	Teams
2013–2016; 2006–2017; 2017–2020; 2020-2021; 2021-	(Cyprus) Apollon Limassol (Greece) Pannaxiakos A.O. Naxos (Greece) Olympiacos Piraeus (Italy) Cuneo Granda (Italy) Pro Victoria Monza

National team
Cyprus
- Last updated: 31 August 2021

Katerina Zakchaiou (Greek: Κατερίνα Ζακχαίου; born July 26, 1998, in Limassol, Cyprus) is a Cypriot female professional volleyball player, member of the Cyprus women's national volleyball team. At club level, she plays for Italian club Pro Victoria Monza.

== Sporting achievements ==
=== National team ===
- 2016 CEV U19 European Championship - Small Countries Division

=== Clubs ===
==== National championships ====
- 2013/2014 Cypriot Championship, with Apollon Limassol
- 2014/2015 Cypriot Championship, with Apollon Limassol
- 2015/2016 Cypriot Championship, with Apollon Limassol
- 2016/2017 Hellenic Championship Runners up, with Pannaxiakos A.O. Naxos
- 2017/2018 Hellenic Championship, with Olympiacos Piraeus
- 2018/2019 Hellenic Championship, with Olympiacos Piraeus

==== National Cups ====
- 2013/2014 Cup of Cyprus, with Apollon Limassol
- 2014/2015 Cup of Cyprus, with Apollon Limassol
- 2015/2016 Cup of Cyprus, with Apollon Limassol
- 2017/2018 Hellenic Cup, with Olympiacos Piraeus
- 2018/2019 Hellenic Cup, with Olympiacos Piraeus

==== National Super Cups ====
- 2013/2014 Super Cup of Cyprus, with Apollon Limassol
- 2014/2015 Super Cup of Cyprus, with Apollon Limassol
- 2015/2016 Super Cup of Cyprus, with Apollon Limassol

==== International Cups ====
- 2017/2018 CEV Challenge Cup, with Olympiacos Piraeus

=== Individuals ===
- 2016 Semi finals of 2016-17 Hellenic Championship Final-four: M.V.P.
