= Nadzeya Malasai =

Belarusian volleyball player

Personal information
- Full name: Nadzeya Nikolaevna Malasai Smirnova
- Nationality: Belarus
- Born: 14 December 1990 (age 35); Barysaw, Byelorussian SSR, Soviet Union
- Height: 182 cm (72 in)
- Weight: 72 kg (159 lb)
- Spike: 303 cm (119 in)
- Block: 290 cm (110 in)

Volleyball information
- Position: Outside-spiker
- Current club: (Belarus) Minczanka Minsk
- Number: 3 (National team), 15 (Club)

Career
Years	Teams
2002-2013	(Belarus) Atlant Baranovitchi
2013-2015	(Russia) VK Proton Balakov
2015-2017	(Greece) Olympiacos Piraeus
2017-	(Belarus) Minczanka Minsk

National team
2009	Belarus

Nadzeya Malasai (born 14 December 1990) is a Belarusian volleyball player, playing as an outside-spiker. She is part of the Belarus women's national volleyball team. She competed at the 2015 Women's European Volleyball Championship.

== Career ==
In the summer of 2015, Malasai moved to Greece and was transferred to Olympiacos Piraeus, where she remained until 2017. With the Red-whites of Piraeus she won the double twice (Hellenic Championship and Hellenic Cup) in the 2015–16 and 2016–17 seasons. Moreover, in 2017 she was runner up of the European Challenge Cup, in the course of Olympiacos to the final of the competition. In Summer 2018, when her contract with Olympiacos was over, she left Piraeus and transferred to Minczanka Minsk. With the Belarusian team she won the silver medal of 2017–18 European CEV Cup.

== International career ==
Nadzeya Malasai is member of the Belarus women's national volleyball team. She started in 2007 in the youth team and was promoted to the women's group in 2009. She has participated in several events, such as World Championship Qualifiers, European Championship Qualifiers or Finals and European League games from 2009 up to now.

== Sporting achievements ==
=== International competitions ===
- 2017 CEV Women's Challenge Cup, with Olympiacos Piraeus
- 2018 Women's CEV Cup, with Minczanka Minsk

=== National championships ===
5 Belarusian Championships

- 2007/2008 Belarusian Championship with Atlant Baranovitchi
- 2008/2009 Belarusian Championship with Atlant Baranovitchi
- 2010/2011 Belarusian Championship with Atlant Baranovitchi
- 2011/2012 Belarusian Championship with Atlant Baranovitchi
- 2017/2018 Belarusian Championship with Minchanka Minsk
  - 2012/2013 Belarusian Championship Runners up with Atlant Baranovitchi

2 Hellenic Championships

- 2015/2016 Hellenic Championship, with Olympiacos Piraeus
- 2016/2017 Hellenic Championship, with Olympiacos Piraeus

=== National trophies ===
- 2015/2016 Hellenic Cup, with Olympiacos Piraeus
- 2016/2017 Hellenic Cup, with Olympiacos Piraeus
