= Melina Emmanouilidou =

Greek volleyball player

Personal information
- Nationality: Greece
- Born: September 18, 1994 (age 32) Korinthos, Greece
- Height: 1.87 m (6 ft 2 in)
- Weight: 72 kg (159 lb)
- Spike: 284 cm (112 in)
- Block: 278 cm (109 in)

Volleyball information
- Position: Middle blocker
- Current club: (Greece) AEK
- Number: 5 (club) - 18 (national team)

Career
- Years: Team
- 2006–2008 2008–2012 2012–2015 2015–2017 2017–2021 2021–2026: (Greece) A.S.P. Korinthos (Greece) Artemis Koridallos (Piraeus)) (Greece) Pannaxiakos Naxos (Greece) Olympiacos Piraeus (Greece) A.O. Thira (Greece) Olympiacos Piraeus

National team
- Years: Team
- –: Greece
- Updated on 1 April 2025

Angeliki-Melina Emmanouilidou (Greek: Αγγελική-Μελίνα Εμμανουηλίδου; born September 18, 1994, in Korinthos, Greece) is a female professional volleyball player from Greece, who is a member of the Greece women's national volleyball team. At club level, she plays in Hellenic Volley League for Greek powerhouse AEK.

== Sporting achievements ==
=== European Honours ===
CEV Women's Challenge Cup

- Runner-up: 2017 with Olympiacos S.F. Piraeus

=== National championships ===
- 2014/2015 Hellenic Championship, with Pannaxiakos Naxos
- 2015/2016 Hellenic Championship, with Olympiacos Piraeus
- 2016/2017 Hellenic Championship, with Olympiacos Piraeus
- 2017/2018 Hellenic Championship, with A.O. Thira
- 2018/2019 Hellenic Championship, with A.O. Thira
- 2019/2020 Hellenic Championship, with A.O. Thira
- 2021/2022 Hellenic Championship, with Olympiacos Piraeus
- 2022/2023 Hellenic Championship, with Olympiacos Piraeus
- 2023/2024 Hellenic Championship, with Olympiacos Piraeus
- 2024/2025 Hellenic Championship, with Olympiacos Piraeus

=== National cups ===
- 2013/2014 Hellenic Cup, with Pannaxiakos Naxos
- 2015/2016 Hellenic Cup, with Olympiacos Piraeus
- 2016/2017 Hellenic Cup, with Olympiacos Piraeus
- 2018/2019 Hellenic Cup, with A.O. Thira
- 2020/2021 Hellenic Cup, with A.O. Thira
- 2023/2024 Hellenic Cup, with Olympiacos Piraeus
- 2024 Hellenic Super Cup, with Olympiacos Piraeus
- 2024/2025 Hellenic Cup, with Olympiacos Piraeus
