= Emmanouilidou =

Emmanouilidou is a surname. Notable people with the surname include:

- Melina Emmanouilidou (born 1994), Greek volleyball player
- Polyniki Emmanouilidou (born 2003), Greek athlete
- Thomaïs Emmanouilidou (born 1997), Greek rower
