= Aliki Konstantinidou =

Greek volleyball player

Personal information
- Nationality: Greece
- Born: June 26, 1989 (age 37); Thessaloniki, Greece
- Height: 1.80 m (5 ft 11 in)
- Weight: 70 kg (150 lb)
- Spike: 286 cm (113 in)
- Block: 270 cm (110 in)

Volleyball information
- Position: Middle blocker
- Current club: Retired

Career
Years	Teams
2002–2006; 2006–2007; 2007–2008; 2008–2011; 2011–2013; 2013–2014; 2014–2015; 2015–2016; 2016–2017; 2017–2020	(Greece) X.A.N. Thessaloniki (Greece) Iraklis Thessaloniki V.C. (Greece) Earinos Thessaloniki (Greece) Peiramatiko Lyceum Thes. (Greece) Anatolia College Thes. (Greece) Pannaxiakos V.C. (Greece) Olympiacos Piraeus (Greece) AEK Athens (Greece) Pananthinaikos Athens (Greece) Olympiacos Piraeus

National team
(Greece) Hellas - 19 caps (05.2018)
- Last updated: 21 August 2024

Aliki Konstantinidou (Greek: Αλίκη Κωνσταντινίδου; born June 26, 1989, in Thessaloniki, Greece) is a retired professional women's volleyball player from Greece, who was a member of the Greece women's national volleyball team.

== Career ==
Alikis Konstantinidou's first contact with sports venues was at a very young age with swimming, which she engaged in for about nine years. But because swimming as an individual sport did not inspire her, and mainly at the urging of her father Alexandros Konstantinidis who was an international volleyball player, she finally turned to volleyball.
In 2002, at the age of 13, she joined the academies of H.A.N. Thessaloniki, where she remained until 2006, when she was acquired by Iraklis Thessaloniki, competing in the A1 National Division. In 2007 she moved to Earinos Thessaloniki, and in 2008 to the college team of S.A. Peiramatiko Thessaloniki, with which in 2009–10 season she won the Championship of the 2nd group of A2 Division and of course the promotion to the A1 National Division. After the relegation of Peiramatiko at the end of the 2010–11 season, she was transferred to the other college team of Thessaloniki, S.A.A.K. Anatolia, where she remained until 2013, competing in the A1 National Division of the Hellenic Championship.

Her excellent performances in the championship attracted the interest of Pannaxiakos, which had just been promoted to the major division. Thus, in the Summer of 2013, Aliki Konstantinidou takes the first big leap in her career and joins the Naxos club, with which she experiences her first great success, reaching the final of the Hellenic Cup in 2014.
In the summer of the same year, she takes the ship to Piraeus and signs a contract with Olympiacos, with which she won both the Hellenic Championship and the Hellenic Cup of the 2014–15 season, but unexpectedly Olympiacos did not renew her contract, despite her significant appearance in winning the double by the Piraeus club.

The following year is spent at A.E.K. Athens, with which she reached the final of the Hellenic Cup again in 2016, but at the end of the season he moved again, this time to Panathinaikos. Because of the financial events in the Athenian club in the Summer of 2017 she remained without a club, so she accepted the proposal of Olympiacos Piraeus to rejoin the team of the "big port", with which in the 2017–18 season she tasted the success of winning the CEV Challenge Cup, and the domestic conquests of the Championship and the Greek Cup as well, in the most successful year for the women's volleyball team of the "Red-whites". Aliki Konstantinidou remained at Olympiakos until the 2019–20 season, and won two more Greek Championships in the 2018–19 and 2019–20 seasons as well as the Hellenic Cup in 2019.
In July 2020, Aliki Konstantinidou announced her retirement from active action after 18 years of a rich career, and said goodbye to the field of volleyball with the following announcement:

"After several years of training, competitions, missions, successes, failures, travels, titles, injuries, joy, sadness, the difficult time has come to say goodbye to the sport I loved and served with all my soul.
I want to thank everyone together and each one individually: fellow athletes, coaches, staff, agents, trainers, caregivers. I want to thank all the clubs I worked with. Above all, I want to thank all the people who believed in me and supported me in my most difficult moments.
Through this space I created bonds with people who will follow me for a lifetime. I feel full and lucky for what I have experienced in these sports years, experiences that have shaped my character and improved my personality.
I will continue to be next to the team I loved and the people who became my second family.
Now a new cycle opens in my professional life, on an object that I love just as much as volleyball!".

== Intrernational career ==
Aliki Konstantinidou was called up to the Women's Hellenic National Team for the first time in 2006, at the age of 17. Since 2011, however, she became a member of the national representative group several times. In 2013 she participated in the qualifiers for the 2014 World Championship and in 2014 in the qualifiers for the 2015 European Championship, and in matches for the Europa League as well. She was then declared to CEV for 2017 European Championship, but she only participated in friendly preparation matches.
Aliki Konstantinidou made a total of 19 official appearances with the Hellenic national women's volleyball team.

== Studies - Activities ==
While playing for the Thessaloniki teams, Aliki Konstantinidou studied at the School of Early Childhood Education of the Aristotle University, from which she received her degree in 2011. Then and at the same time as her professional career in volleyball, she continued to work with children, and in 2015 she trained as a "Baby Swimming Instructor Level 1, 2", and in 2016 as a "Baby Swimming Instructor with special skills" (Baby Swimming Instructor Special Needs) by the organization Birthlight UK. Thus, she combined her original occupation with swimming with her love for children and sports. Also in 2017 she trained in "Prenatal Yoga in water" courses (Aquanatal Yoga Instructor) and σηε attended many seminars on the psychology of children, their reflexes and parenthood.

== Sporting achievements ==
=== International competitions ===
- 2017/2018: CEV Women's Challenge Cup, with Olympiacos Piraeus

=== National championships ===
- 2014/2015 Hellenic Championship, with Olympiacos Piraeus
- 2016/2017 Hellenic Championship, with Panathinaikos Athens
- 2017/2018 Hellenic Championship, with Olympiacos Piraeus
- 2018/2019 Hellenic Championship, with Olympiacos Piraeus

=== National trophies ===
- 2013/2014 Runners up in Hellenic Cup, with Pannaxiakos A.O. Naxos
- 2014/2015 Hellenic Cup, with Olympiacos Piraeus
- 2015/2016 Runners up in Hellenic Cup, with AEK Athens
- 2017/2018 Hellenic Cup, with Olympiacos Piraeus
- 2018/2019 Hellenic Cup, with Olympiacos Piraeus
