= Evangelia Kyriakidou =

Greek volleyball player

Evi Kyriakidou

Personal information
- Nationality: Greece
- Born: July 27, 1981 (age 45); Thessaloniki, Greece
- Height: 1.84 m (6 ft 0 in)

Volleyball information
- Position: Middle blocker

Career
Years	Teams
1992–2002; 2002–2003; 2004–2005; 2005–2010; 2010–2012; 2012–2014; 2014–2016; 2016–2017	(Greece) Aiantas (Greece) Apollonios (Greece) Olympiacos Piraeus (Greece) Iraklis Thessaloniki (Greece) Olympiacos Piraeus (Greece) Iraklis Thessaloniki (Greece) Aias Evosmou (Greece) Aias Kilkis

National team
Greece
- Last updated: 8 July 2017

Evangelia "Evi" Kyriakidou (Greek: Εύη Κυριακίδου; born July 27, 1981) is a volleyball player from Greece. who has been member of the Greece women's national volleyball team. She was a part of the Greek national team at the 2011 Women's European Volleyball League. At club level, she played most notably for Greek powerhouse Olympiacos Piraeus (2004–2005 and 2010–2012), winning the Greek Cup in 2011.

== Sporting achievements ==
=== National cups ===
- 2010/2011 Greek Cup, with Olympiacos Piraeus
