= Zenia Tsima =

Greek volleyball player (born 1986)

Personal information
- Nationality: Greece
- Born: May 17, 1986 (age 40) Devin, Bulgaria
- Height: 1.85 m (6 ft 1 in)
- Weight: 80 kg (180 lb)
- Spike: 284 cm (112 in)
- Block: 278 cm (109 in)

Volleyball information
- Position: Outside hitter
- Current club: (Greece) Olympiacos S.F. Piraeus

Career
- Years: Team
- 2001–2006 2006–2012 2012–2013 2013–2016 2016–2017: (Greece) Ilisiakos (Greece) A.O. Markopoulou (Greece) AEK Athens (Greece) Panathinaikos Athens (Greece) Olympiacos Piraeus

National team
- Years: Team
- –: (Greece) Hellas - 65 caps
- Updated on 26 September 2018

Evgenia (Zenia) Tsima (Greek: Ζένια Τσίμα; born May 17, 1986, in Devin, Bulgaria) is a female former Greek professional volleyball player who was a member of the Greece women's national volleyball team. In Summer 2017 she withdrew for family reasons.

== Sporting achievements ==
=== European Honours ===
CEV Women's Challenge Cup

- Runner-up: 2017 with Olympiacos S.F. Piraeus

=== National championships ===
- 2016/2017 Hellenic Championship, with Olympiacos S.F. Piraeus

=== National cups ===
- 2016/2017 Hellenic Cup, with Olympiacos S.F. Piraeus
