= Jana Franziska Poll =

German volleyball player

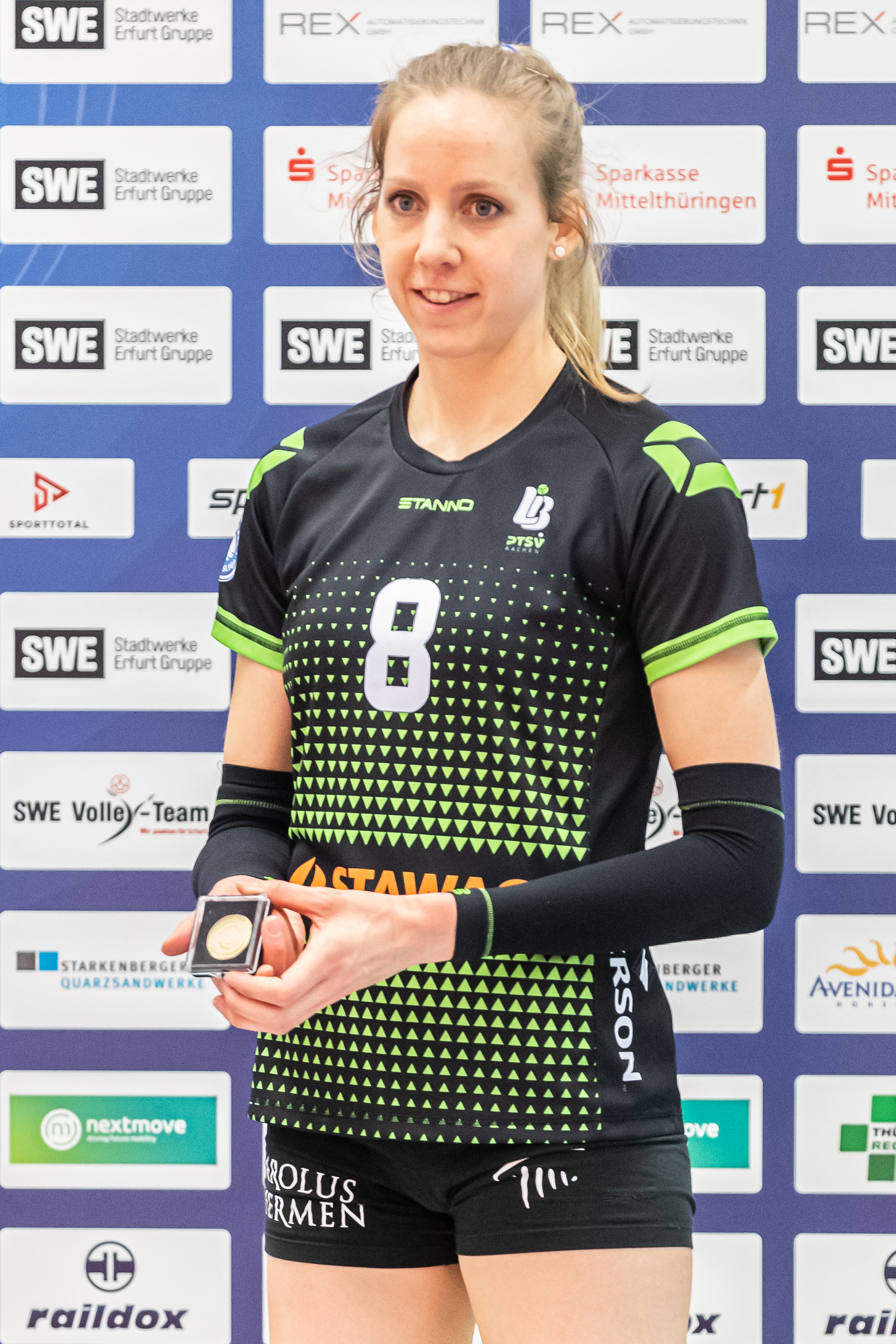

Personal information
- Born: 7 May 1988 (age 38); Meppen, West Germany
- Height: 1.85 m (6 ft 1 in)
- Weight: 69 kg (152 lb)
- Spike: 310 cm (122 in)
- Block: 290 cm (114 in)

Volleyball information
- Current club: (Italy) VolAlto Caserta

Career
Years	Teams
2005	(Germany) SV Union Meppen
2005–2008	(Germany) SCU Emlichheim
2008–2012	(Germany) Alemannia Aachen
2012–2013	(Germany) Rote Raben Vilsbiburg
2013-2015	(Germany) Schweriner SC
2015–2016	(Germany) VT Aurubis Hamburg
2016–2017	(Greece) Panathinaikos Athens
2017–2018	(Greece) Olympiacos Piraeus
2018–2019	(Germany) Allianz MTV Stuttgart
2019–2020	(Italy) VolAlto Caserta
2020	(Italy) Azzurra Volley Firenze
2020–2023	(Germany) Ladies in Black Aachen
2023–2019	(Germany) SCU Emlichheim

National team
2013-	Germany - 87 caps (09.2019)
Medal record
Women's volleyball
Representing Germany
European Championship
Silver medal – second place	2013 Germany	Team
- Last updated: September 2019

Jana Franziska Poll (born 7 May 1988 in Meppen, West Germany) is a German volleyball player, member of the Germany women's national volleyball team. At club level, she plays for German SCU Emlichheim.

== National team career ==
Poll made her first appearances with Germany women's national volleyball team in 2013. She was part of the German national team who won the gold medal at the 2013 Women's European Volleyball League in Bulgaria and the silver medal at the 2013 Women's European Volleyball Championship in Germany & Switzerland. In 2016, she participated in the 2016 FIVB Volleyball World Grand Prix.

== Career ==
After several years in the German League without winning any title, in the summer of 2016 Jana Franziska Poll traveled to Greece, signing with the historic club Panathinaikos Athens, where she remained for one year.

In July 2017 she made a contract with Greek powerhouse Olympiacos S.F. Piraeus. In 2017–18 season, Poll won both Hellenic competitions with the red-whites of Piraeus: the Hellenic Championship and the Hellenic Cup as well. Although, undoubtedly her bigger achievement was the title of the 2018 CEV Women's Challenge Cup. In that competition Jana Franziska Poll was nominated as 2nd best scorer and 2nd best attacker with 149 points and 119 points respectively.

In the summer of 2018 Poll returned to Germany for family reasons, making a contract with Allianz MTV Stuttgart, accepting the invitation of Yannis Athanassopoulos, the Greek coach of the Stuttgart club.

During the 2018–19 season, she became German Champion with Stuttgart in the Deutsche Volleyball-Bundesliga and reached the quarter finals of the CEV Women's Champions League. At the end of the season, she wanted to leave Stuttgart and envisioned returning to the Ladies in Black in Aachen to be closer to her husband. Shortly after signing, Aachen had to step back from the contract due to the club's financial troubles. She then switched to the new entry in Italy's first league, VolAlto Caserta.

== Sporting achievements ==
=== National team ===
- 2013 Women's European Volleyball League (Varna, Bulgaria)
- 2013 Women's European Volleyball Championship (Germany / Switzerland)

=== Clubs ===
==== International competitions ====
- 2018 CEV Women's Challenge Cup, with Olympiacos S.F. Piraeus
- 2019 Quarter Finalists in CEV Women's Champions League, with Allianz MTV Stuttgart

==== National championships ====
- 2017/2018 Hellenic Championship, with Olympiacos Piraeus
- 2018/2019 German Women's Championship, with Allianz MTV Stuttgart

==== National trophies ====
- 2017/2018 Hellenic Cup, with Olympiacos S.F. Piraeus
- 2018/2019 German Cup, with Allianz MTV Stuttgart
