= Anna Kavatha =

Greek volleyball player

Personal information
- Nationality: Greece
- Born: December 15, 1987 (age 38); Athens, Greece
- Height: 1.87 m (6 ft 2 in)

Volleyball information
- Position: Middle blocker

Career
| Years | Teams |
|---|---|
| 2006–2008; 2008–2010; 2010–2013; 2013–2014; 2014–2015; 2015 | (Greece) A.Ε. Vyrona (Greece) A.O. Markopoulo (Greece) Olympiacos Piraeus (Greece) AEK Athens (Greece) A.O. Thiras (Greece) AEK Athens |

National team
| Greece |

Anna Kavatha (Greek: Άννα Καβαθά; born December 15, 1987, in Athens, Greece) is a volleyball player from Greece, who has been a member of the Greece women's national volleyball team. At club level, she played for Greek powerhouse Olympiacos Piraeus from 2010 to 2013, winning 1 Greek Championship and 3 Greek Cups.

== Sporting achievements ==
=== National championships ===
- 2012/2013 Greek Championship, with Olympiacos Piraeus

=== National cups ===
- 2010/2011 Greek Cup, with Olympiacos Piraeus
- 2011/2012 Greek Cup, with Olympiacos Piraeus
- 2012/2013 Greek Cup, with Olympiacos Piraeus
