= Alexia Kalantaridou =

Greek volleyball player

Personal information
- Full name: Alexia Kalantaridou
- Nationality: Greece
- Born: January 19, 1995 (age 31); Katerini, Greece
- Height: 1.86 m (6 ft 1 in)
- Weight: 74 kg (163 lb)
- Spike: 290 cm (110 in)
- Block: 275 cm (108 in)

Volleyball information
- Position: Outside hitter
- Number: 14 (club) - 13 (national team)

Career
Years	Teams
2005–2010; 2010–2011; 2011–2015; 2055–2016; 2016–2017; 2017–2019; 2019–2020; 2020–2021; 2021; 2021–2023	(Greece) GAS Archelaos Katerinis (Greece) Aris Thessaloniki (Greece) Aias Evosmou (Greece) Aris Thessaloniki (Greece) Elpis Ampelokipon (Greece) A.O. Thira (Greece) Olympiacos S.F. Piraeus (Greece) A.O. Lamia (Finland) Oriveden Ponnistus (Greece) A.O. Markopoulo

National team
(Greece) Hellas - 19 apps (06.2018)
- Last updated: October 31, 2023

Alexia Kalantaridou (Greek: Αλεξία Καλανταρίδου; born January 19, 1995, in Katerini, Greece) is a female professional volleyball player from Greece, who was a member of the Greece women's national volleyball team.

== Sporting achievements ==
=== Clubs ===
==== National championships ====
- 2017/2018 Hellenic Championship, with A.O. Thira
- 2018/2019 Hellenic Championship, with A.O. Thira
- 2019/2020 Hellenic Championship, with Olympiacos Piraeus

==== National trophies ====
- 2018/2019 Hellenic Cup, with A.O. Thira

=== Individuals ===
- 2015-16 Hellenic Championship: Rookie of the season
