= Eleni Kiosi =

Greek volleyball player (born 1985)

Personal information
- Nationality: Greek
- Born: 27 February 1985 (age 41)
- Height: 1.84 m (6 ft 0 in)
- Weight: 69 kg (152 lb)
- Spike: 278 cm (109 in)
- Block: 267 cm (105 in)

Volleyball information
- Current club: PAOK

Career
| Years | Teams |
|---|---|
| 2006-2008; 2008-2009 | (Greece) Olympiacos (Greece) Iraklis Thessaloniki |

National team
| Greece |

Eleni Kiosi (born 27 February 1985) is a Greek female volleyball player. She was part of the Greece women's national volleyball team.

She competed with the national team at the 2004 Summer Olympics in Athens, Greece. She played for Olympiacos and Iraklis Thessaloniki.

== Clubs ==
- (Greece) Olympiacos (2006–08)
- (Greece) Iraklis Thessaloniki (2008–09)

== See also ==
- Greece at the 2004 Summer Olympics
