= Areti Teza =

Greek volleyball player

Personal information
- Nationality: Greece
- Born: April 3, 1980 (age 46); Athens, Greece
- Height: 1.76 m (5 ft 9 in)
- Weight: 64 kg (141 lb)
- Spike: 258 cm (102 in)
- Block: 250 cm (98 in)

Volleyball information
- Position: Setter
- Current club: (Greece) AEK
- Number: 16

Career
Years	Teams
1989–2000; 2000–2005; 2005–2009; 2009–2010; 2010–2012; 2012–2017; 2017–2018; 2018–	(Greece) G.S. Petroupolis (Greece) FO Vrilissia (Greece) Panellinios G.S. (Greece) G.S. Kerateas (Greece) A.O. Trachones (Greece) Olympiacos Piraeus (Greece) Artemis Korydallou (Greece) AEK

National team
Greece
- Last updated: 28 June 2017

Areti Teza (Greek: Αρετή Τέζα; born April 3, 1980, in Athens, Greece) is a female professional volleyball player from Greece, who was a member of the Greece women's national volleyball team. At club level, she played for Greek powerhouse Olympiacos Piraeus from 2012 to 2017 and she currently plays for Artemis Korydallou.

== Sporting achievements ==
=== European Honours ===
CEV Women's Challenge Cup

- Runner-up: 2017 with Olympiacos S.F. Piraeus

=== National championships ===
- 2003/2004 Hellenic Championship, with FO Vrilissia
- 2012/2013 Hellenic Championship, with Olympiacos S.F. Piraeus
- 2013/2014 Hellenic Championship, with Olympiacos S.F. Piraeus
- 2014/2015 Hellenic Championship, with Olympiacos S.F. Piraeus
- 2015/2016 Hellenic Championship, with Olympiacos S.F. Piraeus
- 2016/2017 Hellenic Championship, with Olympiacos S.F. Piraeus

=== National cups ===
- 2002/2003 Hellenic Cup, with FO Vrilissia
- 2003/2004 Hellenic Cup, with FO Vrilissia
- 2012/2013 Hellenic Cup, with Olympiacos S.F. Piraeus
- 2013/2014 Hellenic Cup, with Olympiacos S.F. Piraeus
- 2014/2015 Hellenic Cup, with Olympiacos S.F. Piraeus
- 2015/2016 Hellenic Cup, with Olympiacos S.F. Piraeus
- 2016/2017 Hellenic Cup, with Olympiacos S.F. Piraeus
