= Mallori Gibson =

American volleyball player and coach

Personal information
- Nationality: American
- Born: February 23, 1987 (age 39)
- Hometown: Bakersfield, California, U.S.
- Height: 5 ft 10 in (1.78 m)
- Education: University of Colorado Boulder; University of the Pacific

Coaching information
- Current team: Stanislaus State Warriors
Previous teams coached
Years	Teams
2015–	Stanislaus State Warriors

Volleyball information
- Position: Outside hitter

Career
Years	Teams
2005–2007	Colorado Buffaloes
2008–2010	Pacific Tigers
2011	Olympiacos

Mallori Gibson (born February 23, 1987) is an American retired volleyball player who is now a volleyball coach, currently in charge of Stanislaus State Warriors women's volleyball team. In 2011 she played for Greek powerhouse Olympiacos in the Greek Women's Volleyball League and the Greek Cup. Gibson went on to win the 2011 Greek Cup with Olympiacos after a 3–2 win against AEK Athens in the final in Samos.

== Sporting achievements ==
=== Clubs ===
- 2010/2011 Greek Cup, with Olympiacos Piraeus

=== Individual ===
- 2x All-Big West Conference First Team outside hitter, with Pacific Tigers
