= Kokkinaki =

Kokkinaki is a Greek-language surname. As a Greek surname it is the feminine form of Kokkinakis. In Russia it is a masculine surname.

- Konstantin Kokkinaki (1910–1990), Soviet test pilot
- Vladimir Kokkinaki (1904–1985), Soviet test pilot, brother of Konstantin
