= Niki Manolakou =

Greek volleyball player (born 1978)

Personal information
- Nationality: Greece
- Born: June 15, 1978 (age 48); Piraeus, Greece
- Height: 1.79 m (5 ft 10 in)

Volleyball information
- Position: Setter

Career
Years	Teams
1990–2005; 2005–2006; 2006–2007; 2007–2010; 2014–2015	(Greece) Olympiacos Piraeus (Greece) FO Vrilissia (Greece) Olympiacos Piraeus (Greece) Apollonios (Greece) Porfyras

Niki Manolakou (Greek: Νίκη Μανωλάκου; born June 15, 1978, in Piraeus, Greece) is a Greek female retired professional volleyball player, who played for and captained Greek powerhouse Olympiacos Piraeus. She was a member of the club for more than 15 years (1990–2005 and 2006–2007). Manolakou played the setter position.
