= Alexandra Diplarou =

Greek volleyball player (born 1981)

Personal information
- Nationality: Greece
- Born: December 8, 1981 (age 44); Greece
- Height: 1.85 m (6 ft 1 in)

Volleyball information
- Position: Opposite hitter

Career
Years	Teams
2000–2005; 2006–2007	(Greece) Olympiacos Piraeus (Greece) Apollonios

Alexandra Diplarou (Greek: Αλεξάνδρα Διπλάρου; born December 8, 1981, in Greece) is a Greek female retired professional volleyball player, who played for Greek powerhouse Olympiacos Piraeus. She was a member of the club for 5 years (2000–2005). Diplarou played the opposite hitter position.
