= Giulia Rondon =

Italian volleyball player (born 1987)

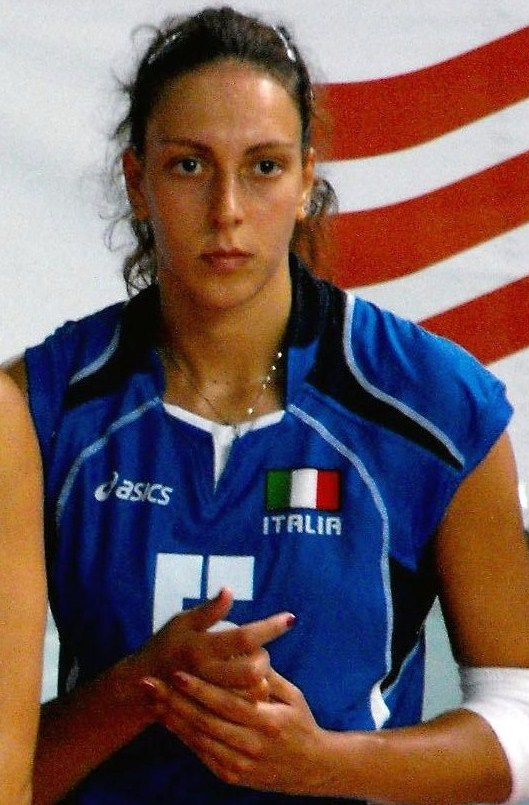

Personal information
- Nationality: Italian
- Born: 16 October 1987 (age 39); Pisa, Italy
- Height: 1.90 m (6 ft 3 in)
- Weight: 75 kg (165 lb)
Medal record
Women's volleyball
Representing Italy
Mediterranean Games
Bronze medal – third place	2005 Almería	Team
Gold medal – first place	2009 Pescara	Team

Giulia Rondon (born 16 October 1987 in Pisa) is an Italian professional volleyball player. She plays for Italy women's national volleyball team. She competed in the 2012 Summer Olympics. She is 1.89 m (6 ft 2 in) tall.
