= Özge Kırdar Kinasts =

Turkish volleyball player (born 1985)

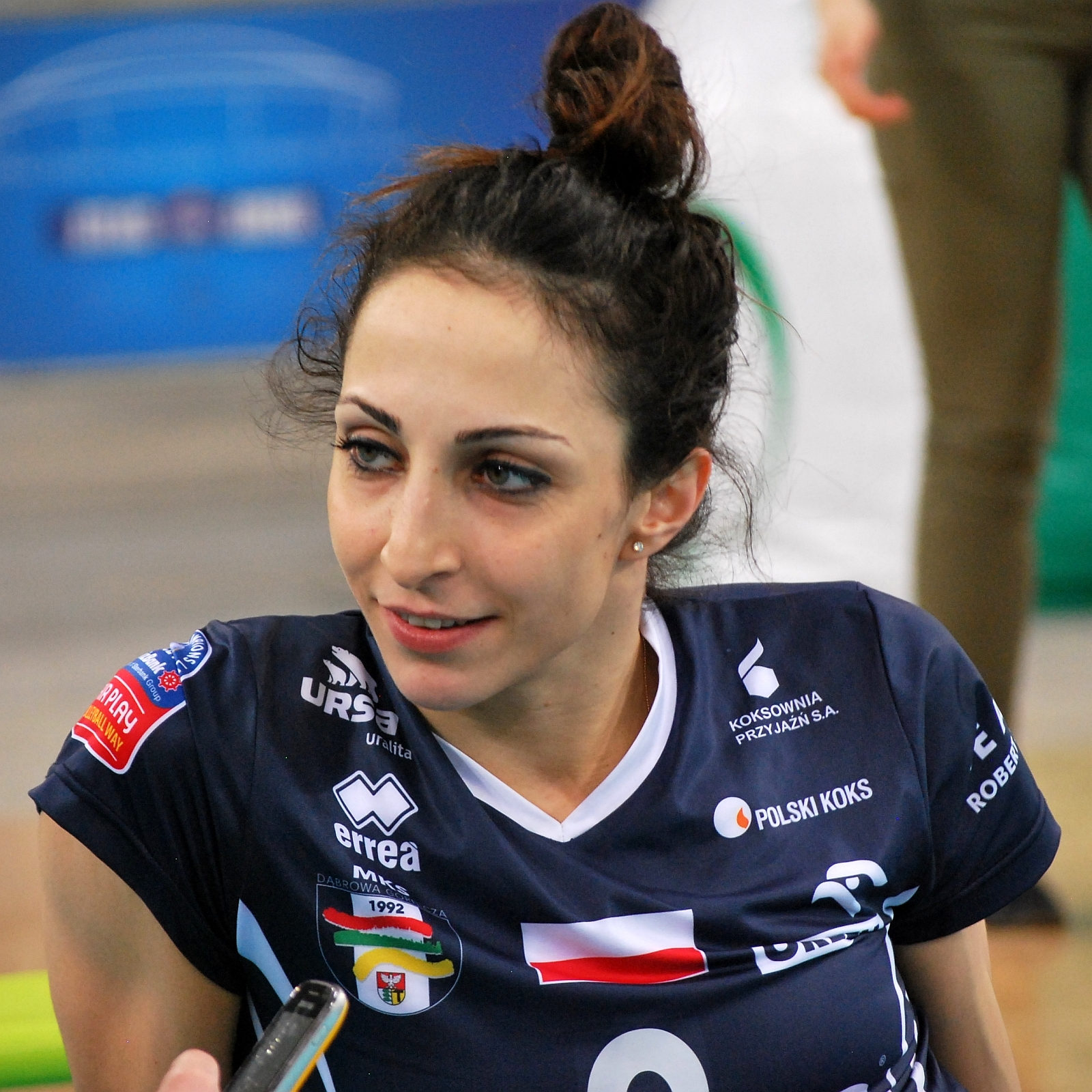

Personal information
- Full name: Özge Kırdar Kinasts; Özge Kırdar Çemberci
- Born: Özge Kırdar; June 26, 1985 (age 41) Kütahya, Turkey
- Height: 1.82 m (6 ft 0 in)
- Weight: 75 kg (165 lb)
- Spike: 300 cm (118 in)
- Block: 285 cm (112 in)

Volleyball information
- Position: Setter
- Current club: Bursa BB
- Number: 9

National team
- Years: Team
- –: Turkey
Medal record
Women's volleyball
Representing Turkey
European Championships
Bronze medal – third place	2011 Italy-Serbia	Team
Mediterranean Games
Silver medal – second place	2009 Pescara	Team
Silver medal – second place	2013 Mersin	Team

Özge Kırdar Kinasts (born June 26, 1985, in Kütahya, Turkey)is a Turkish volleyball player. She is 182 cm (72 in) and plays as setter. She currently plays for Sporting Clube de Portugal. She is regular national team player.

== Career ==
Kırdar won the 2016–17 Challenge Cup and won the tournament's Most Valuable Player award.

== Personal life ==
Kırdar is married to Girts Kinasts (former CI at Flyspot and current Nine Set manager). She is the twin sister of VakıfBank Güneş Sigorta Türk Telekom outside hitter Gözde Kırdar.

== Clubs ==
- (Turkey) Yeşilyurt (2005–2006)
- (Turkey) Fenerbahçe (2006–2007)
- (Turkey) Ereğli Belediyespor (2007–2008)
- (Turkey) VakıfBank Güneş Sigorta Türk Telekom (2008-2012)
- (Turkey) Eczacıbaşı VitrA (2012-2013)
- (Poland) MKS Dąbrowa Górnicza (2013-2015)
- (Azerbaijan) Lokomotiv Baku (2015-2016)
- (Turkey) Bursa BB (2016-2017)
- (Turkey) Türk Hava Yolları (2018-2020)
- Sporting Clube de Portugal (2023-)

== Awards ==
=== Individuals ===
- Women's CEV Champions League 2010–11 "Best Setter"
- 2016–17 Challenge Cup "Most Valuable Player"

=== Clubs ===
- 2010–11 CEV Champions League - Champion, with VakıfBank Güneş Sigorta Türk Telekom
- 2011 FIVB Club World Championship - Runner-Up, with VakıfBank Türk Telekom
- 2011-12 Aroma League - Runner-Up, with Vakıfbank Türk Telekom
- 2012 Turkish Volleyball Super Cup - Champion, with Eczacıbaşı VitrA
- 2012-2013 Turkish Cup - Runner-Up, with Eczacıbaşı VitrA
- 2012-2013 Turkish League - Runner-Up, with Eczacıbaşı VitrA
- 2016–17 CEV Challenge Cup - Champion, with Bursa BB

=== National team ===
- 2011 European Championship - Bronze medal
- 2012 FIVB World Grand Prix - Bronze medal

== See also ==
- Turkish women in sports

Awards
Preceded by (Italy) Eleonora Lo Bianco	Best Setter of CEV Women's Champions League; 2010-11	Succeeded by (Turkey) Naz Aydemir
