= Dimitra Giakoumi =

Greek volleyball player

Personal information
- Nationality: Greece
- Born: November 26, 1982 (age 43); Athens, Greece
- Height: 1.86 m (6 ft 1 in)

Volleyball information
- Position: Middle blocker

Career
Years	Teams
2000–2004; 2004–2010; 2010–2013; 2013–2015	(Greece) A.Ε. Vyrona (Greece) Iraklis Kifisias (Greece) Olympiacos Piraeus (Greece) AEK Athens

National team
Greece

Dimitra Giakoumi (Greek: Δήμητρα Γιακουμή; born November 26, 1982, in Athens, Greece) is a female professional volleyball player from Greece, who has been a member of the Greece women's national volleyball team. At club level, she played for Greek powerhouse Olympiacos Piraeus from 2010 to 2013, winning 1 Greek Championship and 3 Greek Cups. As Olympiacos captain, she led the club to the first Greek Championship in its history in 2012–13 season, being voted Greek Championship 2012–13 MVP in the process.

== Sporting achievements ==
=== National championships ===
- 2012/2013 Greek Championship, with Olympiacos Piraeus

=== National cups ===
- 2010/2011 Greek Cup, with Olympiacos Piraeus
- 2011/2012 Greek Cup, with Olympiacos Piraeus
- 2012/2013 Greek Cup, with Olympiacos Piraeus

=== Individual ===
- 2012/2013 Greek Championship: MVP
