= Aneta Germanova =

Bulgarian volleyball player (born 1975)

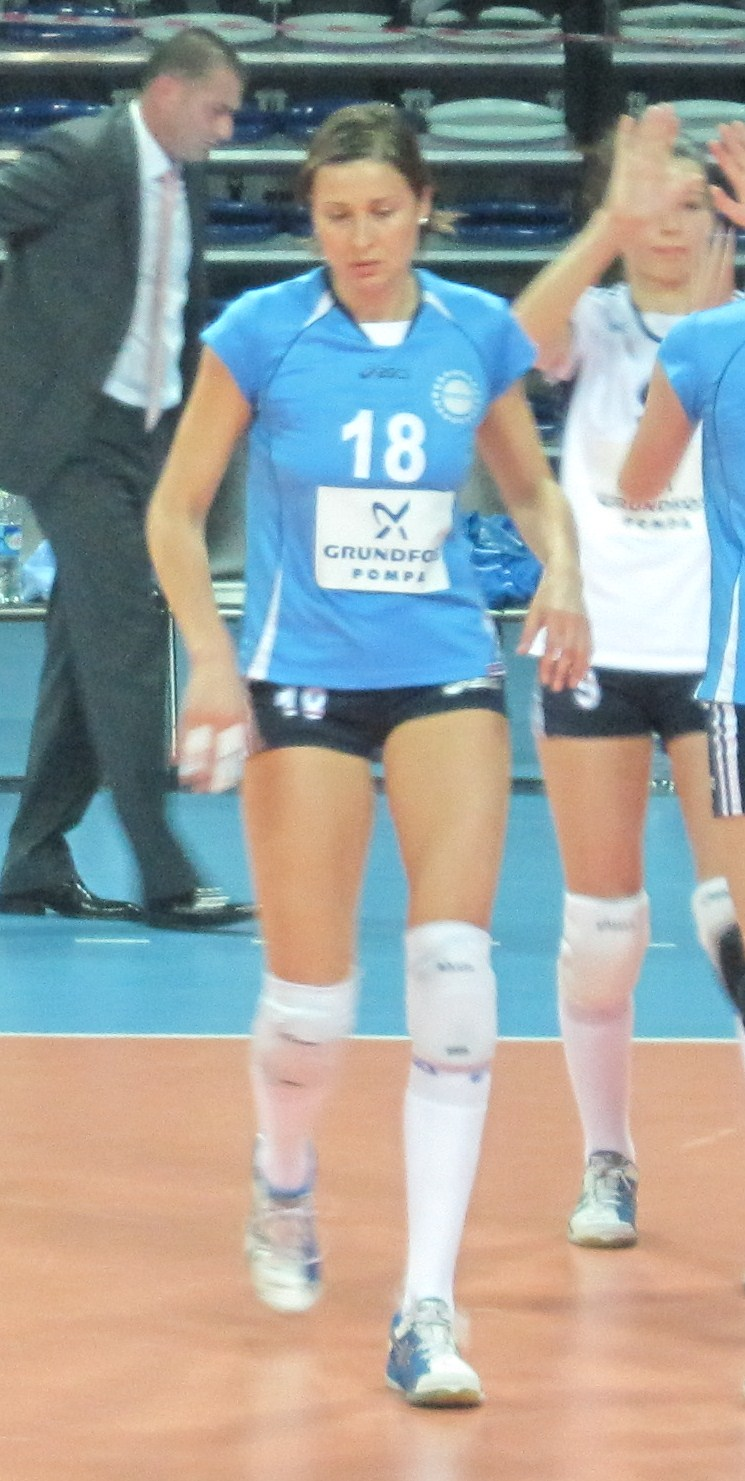

Personal information
- Nationality: Bulgarian
- Born: 3 January 1975 (age 51)
- Height: 186 cm (6 ft 1 in)
- Weight: 72 kg (159 lb)

National team
Bulgaria

Aneta Germanova (Bulgarian: Анета Германова, born 3 January 1975) is a retired Bulgarian female volleyballer who played on the Bulgaria women's national volleyball team for the 1998 FIVB Volleyball Women's World Championship in Japan and 2002 FIVB Volleyball Women's World Championship in Germany, and for Olympiacos in the 2006-07 season.
