= Vasiliki Nikouli =

Greek volleyball player (born 1984)

Vaso Nikouli
Personal information
- Nationality: Greece
- Born: January 1, 1984 (age 42) Larisa, Greece
- Height: 1.80 m (5 ft 11 in)

Volleyball information
- Position: Middle blocker

Career
- Years: Team
- 2000–2002 2002–2003 2003–2004 2004–2005 2005–2006 2006–2011 2011–2012 2012–2013 2013–2014 2014–2015: (Greece) E.A. Larisas (Greece) Panellinios V.C. (Greece) E.A. Larisas (Greece) A.E. Vyrona (Greece) Apollonios (Greece) Olympiacos Piraeus (Greece) Z.A.O.N. (Greece) Larisa (Greece) Filathlitikos Larisaikos (Greece) AEK Athens

National team
- Years: Team
- –: Greece

Vasiliki "Vaso" Nikouli (Greek: Βάσω Νικούλη; born January 1, 1984, in Larisa, Greece) is a female professional volleyball player from Greece, who has been a member of the Greece women's national volleyball team. At club level, she played for Greek powerhouse Olympiacos Piraeus from 2006 to 2011, winning 1 Greek Cup.

== Sporting achievements ==
=== National cups ===
- 2010/2011 Greek Cup, with Olympiacos Piraeus
