= Olympiacos SFP (women's volleyball) =

Greek volleyball club

Olympiacos
- Nickname: Thrylos (The Legend); Erythrolefkes (The Red-Whites)
- Founded: 1930
- Ground: Melina Merkouri Indoor Hall, Piraeus, Greece (Capacity: 2,500)
- Chairman: (Greece) Michalis Kountouris
- Manager: (Serbia) Branko Kovačević
- Captain: Michaela Mlejnková
- League: Hellenic Women’s Volleyball League
- 2025-2026: 5st
- Website: olympiacossfp.gr
- Championships: 1 CEV Challenge Cup; 1 BVA Cup; 9 Hellenic Championships; 11 Hellenic Cups; 1 Greek Super Cup

Uniforms
Home	Away

Olympiacos women's volleyball team (Greek: Ολυμπιακός, [olimbiaˈkos]), commonly referred to as Olympiacos, Olympiacos Piraeus or with its full name as Olympiacos SFP, is the women's volleyball department of the major Greek multi-sport club, Olympiacos SFP, based in Piraeus, Attica. The department was founded in 1930 and their home ground is the Melina Mercouri Indoor Hall in Agios Ioannis Rentis, Piraeus.

Olympiacos is one of the most successful volleyball clubs in Greece and the country's most successful in European competitions, having won 9 League titles, a record 11 Cups, a record 8 Doubles, 1 CEV Challenge Cup (2018) and 1 Continental Treble (2018), the only women's volleyball club in Greece to have won a European title.
They hold the unique records for winning eight consecutive Greek League titles (2013–2020), nine consecutive national Cups (2011–2019) and seven consecutive Doubles (2013–2019).

The season 2017–18 was the most successful in the club's history and the most successful by any Greek women's volleyball club in history; besides winning the aforementioned CEV Challenge Cup in their second final presence in a row, they won the domestic competitions undefeated, with 25–0 wins in the League, finishing the season with only two sets lost in an unprecedented 75–2 set record, and 4–0 wins in the Cup with a 12–1 set record, achieving a Continental Treble and their sixth consecutive domestic Double. In the same season, the men's volleyball team reached the CEV Challenge Cup final and Olympiacos became the first Greek volleyball club that had men and women playing simultaneously in European finals, and one of the very few in the continent to have won European trophies in both departments.

== Honours ==
=== Domestic competitions ===
- Hellenic Championship
  - Winners (9): 2012–13, 2013–14, 2014–15, 2015–16, 2016–17, 2017–18, 2018–19, 2019–20, 2024–25
- Hellenic Cup
  - Winners (11) (record): 2010–11, 2011–12, 2012–13, 2013–14, 2014–15, 2015–16, 2016–17, 2017–18, 2018–19, 2023–24, 2024–25
- Greek Super Cup
  - Winners (1) (shared record): 2024
- Double
  - Winners (8) (record): 2012–13, 2013–14, 2014–15, 2015–16, 2016–17, 2017–18, 2018–19, 2024–25
  - Greek Women's Treble Volleyball Winners (1) (record) 2025

=== European competitions ===
- CEV Women's Challenge Cup
  - Winners (1): 2017–18
  - Runners-up (1): 2016–17
- BVA Cup
  - Winners (1): 2026
- Triple Crowns
  - Winners (1): 2017–18

== International record ==
Season	Achievement	Notes
CEV Cup
2013–14	8th finals	eliminated by Aluprof Bielsko-Biała, 0–3 loss in Piraeus, 3–2 win in Bielsko-Biała
2014–15	8th finals	eliminated by Galatasaray Daikin, 1–3 loss in Istanbul, 0–3 loss in Piraeus
CEV Challenge Cup
2007–08	Quarter-finals	eliminated by Infoplus Minetti Imola, 0–3 loss in San Lazzaro, 0–3 loss in Piraeus
2015–16	8th finals	eliminated by CSM București, 3–0 win in Piraeus, 1–3 (golden set) loss in Bucharest
2016–17	Final	defeated by Bursa BBSK, 3–2 win in Piraeus, 0–3 loss in Bursa
2017–18	Winners	defeated Bursa BBSK, 2–3 loss in Piraeus, 3–1 win in Bursa
2019–20	Semi-finals	Olympiacos reached the semi-finals but CEV Challenge Cup was suspended over COVID-19 pandemic

=== The road to the 2017–18 CEV Challenge Cup victory ===
Round	Team	Home	Away
16th Finals	(Spain) CV Logroño	3–0	2–3
8th Finals	(Romania) CSM Târgoviște	2–3	1–3
Quarter-finals	(Switzerland) Sm'Aesch Pfeffingen	3–0	1–3
Semi-finals	(Russia) Dinamo Krasnodar	3–2	0–3
Finals	(Turkey) Bursa BBSK	2–3	1–3

== Team roster ==
Season 2026–2027

Number	Player	Position	Height	Date of birth
1	(Greece) Eirini Chatziefstratiadou	Middle Blocker	1.85	September 2, 1995 (age 31)
2	(Greece) Marialena Artakianou	Libero	1.70	May 21, 1994 (age 32)
3	(Greece) Dorothea Karagouti	Outside-spiker	1.92	March 30, 2010 (age 16)
5	(Greece) Ifigenia Sampati	Libero	1.70	August 1, 1998 (age 28)
6	(Greece) Anastasia Gallou	Middle Blocker	1.87	November 12, 2010 (age 15)
9	(Greece) - (Finland) Lina Andrikopoulou	Opposite	1.81	May 25, 1998 (age 28)
10	(Italy) Gaia Traballi	Outside-spiker	1.87	February 5, 1997 (age 29)
11	(Greece) Vassiliki Zafeiriou	Setter	1.75	November 6, 2008 (age 17)
13	(United States) Melani Shaffmaster	Setter	1.91	July 13, 2001 (age 25)
14	(Greece) Kiki Terzoglou	Middle Blocker	1.88	November 22, 2003 (age 22)
15	(Bulgaria) Maria Krivoshiyska	Middle Blocker	1.90	September 6, 2001 (age 25)
16	(Czech Republic) Michaela Mlejnková (c)	Outside-spiker	1.85	July 26, 1996 (age 30)
18	(Greece) Andromachi Tsioga	Middle Blocker	1.90	November 3, 2001 (age 25)
22	(Cyprus) Manolina Konstantinou	Outside-spiker	1.83	April 10, 1993 (age 33)
27	(United States) Taylor Bannister	Opposite	1.96	September 7, 1999 (age 27)

=== Technical and managerial staff ===
Name	Job
(Serbia) Branko Kovačević	Head coach
(Greece) Spyros Sarantitis	Assistant coach
(Serbia) Lazar Tabaković	Assistant coach
(Greece) Nikos Katsiouras	Team Manager
(Greece) Xenophon Krokos	Statistician
(Greece) Andreas Fratzeskakis	Trainer
(Greece) Giorgos Tsikouris	Head doctor
(Greece) Xenophon Vlassopoulos	Physio
(Greece) Vangelis Roussos	Conditioner

== Notable players ==
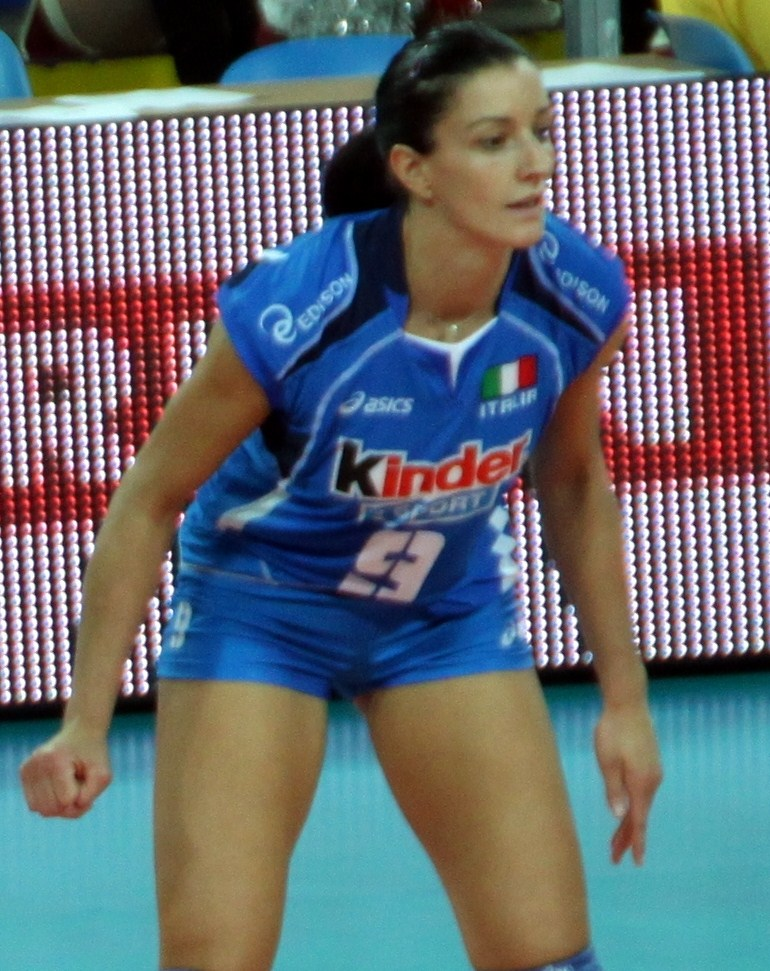
Manuela Secolo

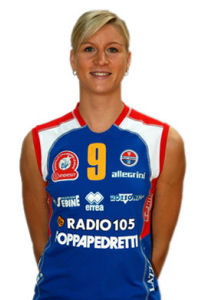
Riikka Lehtonen

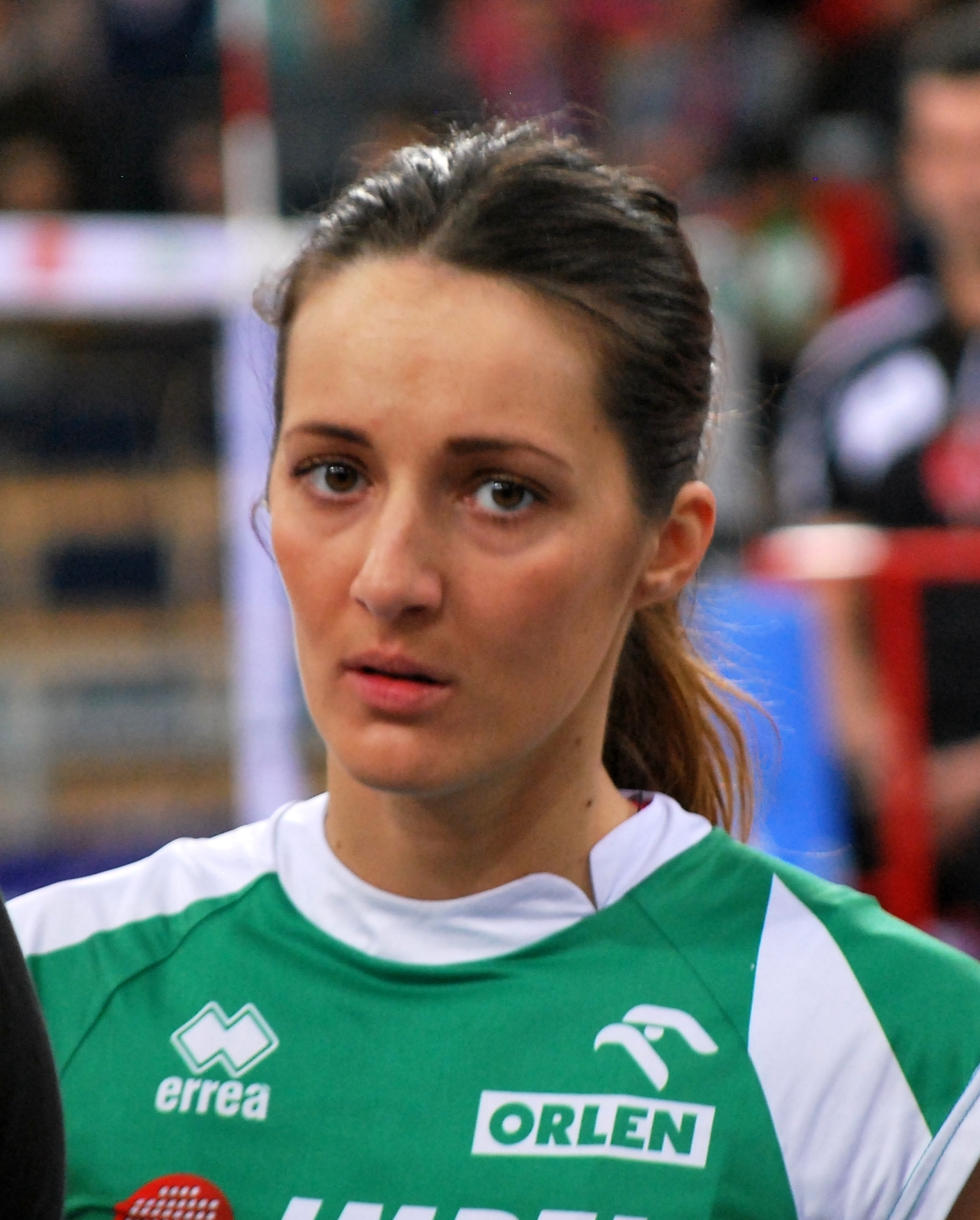
Maja Ognjenović

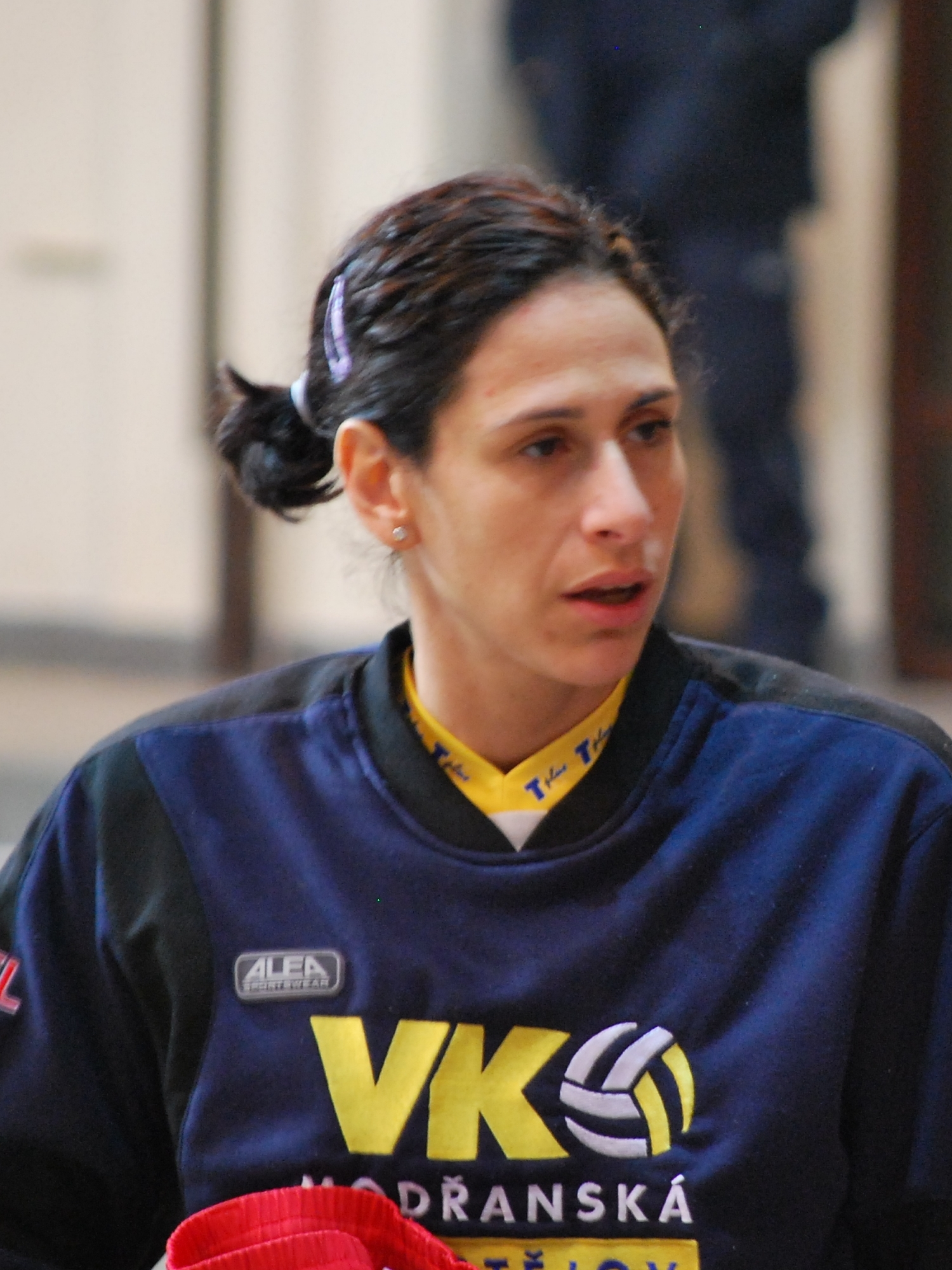
Tatiana Artmenko

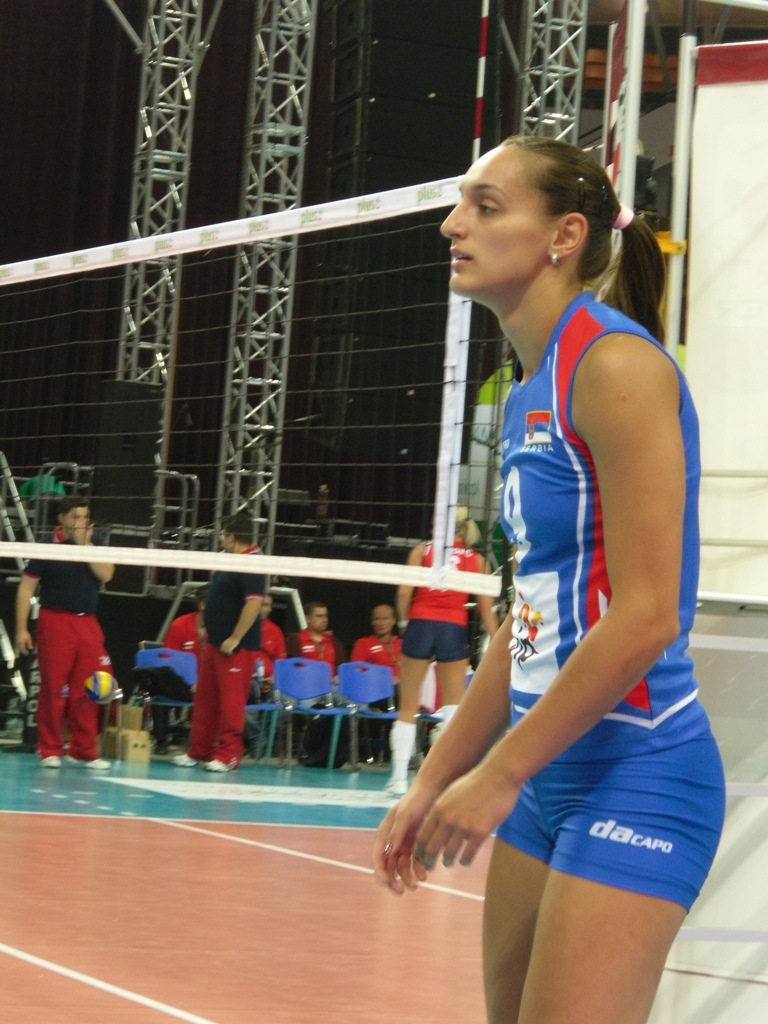
Jovana Vesović

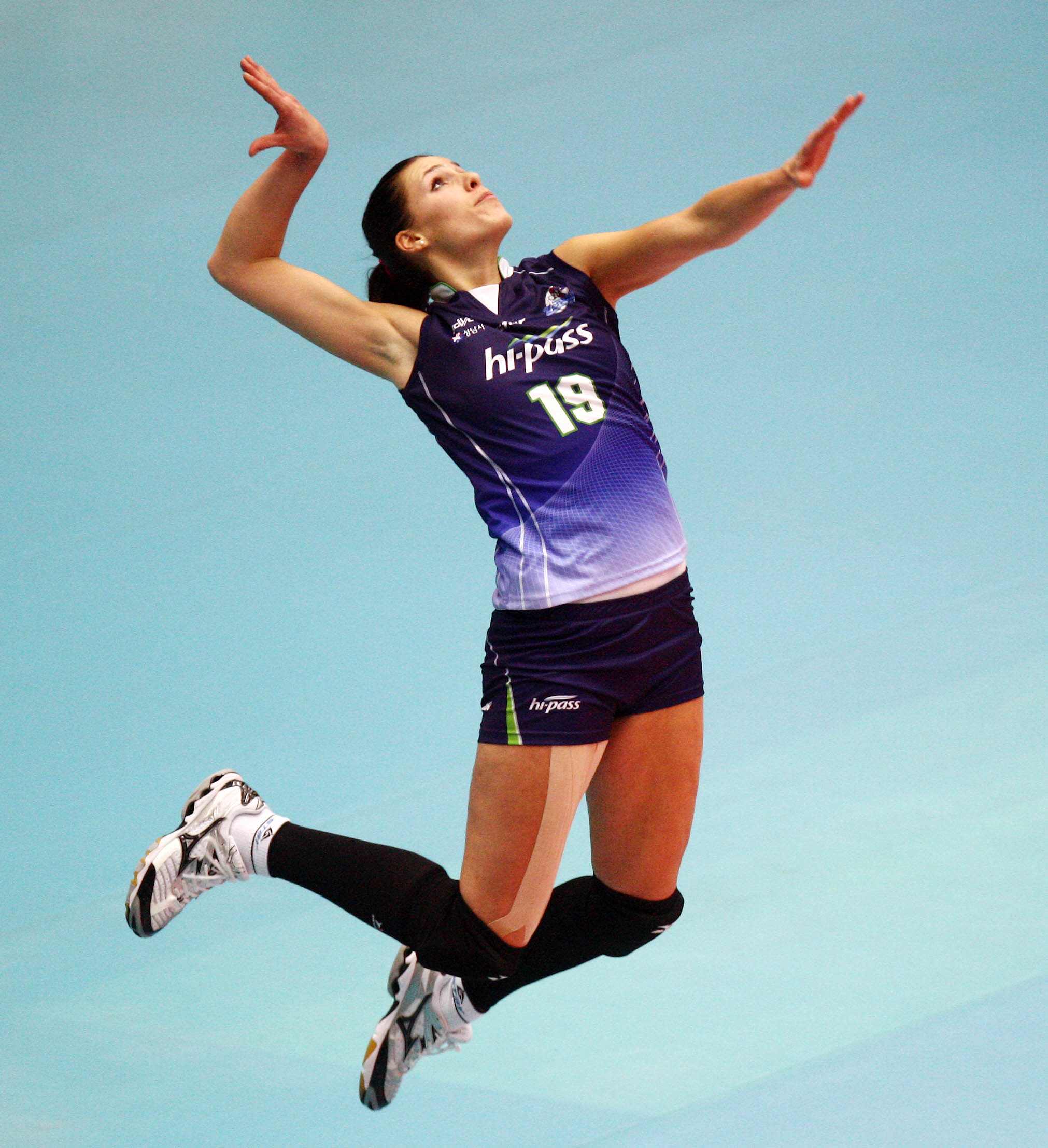
Ivana Nešović

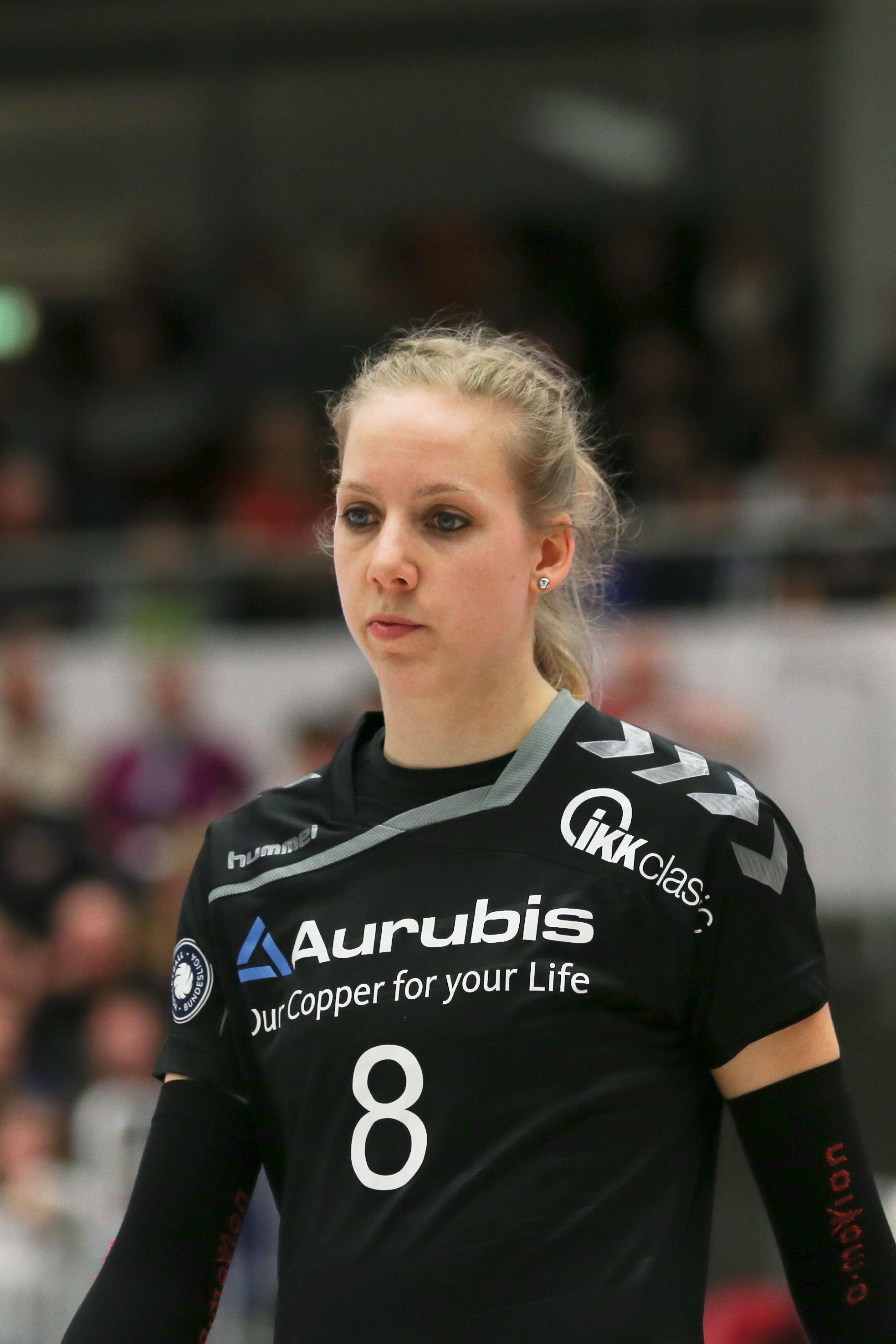
Jana Franziska Poll

(Players are listed in alphabetical order)

Greece

- Eva Chantava
- Evangelia Chatziefraimoglou
- Eirini Chatziefstratiadou
- Maria Chatzinikolaou
- Stella Christodoulou
- Athina Dilaveri
- Alexandra Diplarou
- Vaia Dirva
- Melina Emmanouilidou
- Dimitra Giakoumi
- Katerina Giota
- Eleftheria Hatzinikou
- Marina Kalaitzieva
- Alexia Kalantaridou
- Areti Karavasili
- Anna Kavatha
- Eleni Kiosi
- Pola Kitsou
- Eirini Kokkinaki
- Areta Konomi
- Aliki Konstantinidou
- Sofia Kosma
- Eleftheria Koukou
- Evi Kyriakidou
- Tzina Lamprousi
- Maria Maggina
- Niki Manolakou
- Chrysoula Neratzi
- Katerina Nikolaidou
- Vaso Nikouli
- Maria Nomikou
- Chara Papadopoulou
- Maria Plagiannakou
- Areti Teza
- Athanasia Totsidou
- Zenia Tsima
- Katerina Vasilaki
- Gianna Vlachou
- Anna Xerikou
- Nikol Zaharea

Cyprus

- Manolina Konstantinou
- Katerina Zakchaiou

Argentina

- Leticia Boscacci
- Bianca Farriol
- Yamila Nizetich

Belarus

- Nadzeya Malasai

Belgium

- Freya Aelbrecht

Brazil

- Mariana Costa

Bulgaria

- Aneta Germanova
- Elena Koleva
- Radosveta Teneva
- Gabriela Tsvetanova
- Antonina Zetova

Croatia

- Biljana Gligorović
- Karla Klarić

Cuba

- Wilma Salas

Czech Republic

- Michaela Mlejnková
- Michaela Monzoni
- Lucie Mühlsteinová
- Jana Simankova

Finland

- Riikka Lehtonen

Germany

- Laura Emonts
- Saskia Hippe
- Jana Franziska Poll
- Ivana Vanjak

Hungary

- Katalin Kiss

Israel

- Tatiana Artmenko

Italy

- Giulia Carraro
- Manuela Secolo

Latvia

- Julia Borisova

Russia

- Yuliya Saltsevich

Serbia

- Aleksandra Crnčević
- Svetlana Krstić
- Milica Kubura
- Ana Lazarević
- Ivana Luković
- Ivana Nešović
- Maja Ognjenović
- Biljana Simanić
- Jovana Vesović
- Jovana Stevanović

Slovakia

- Ivana Bramborová
- Martina Noseková

Slovenia

- Sonja Borovinšek

Ukraine

- Eleni Gkortsaniouk
- Olga Trach

United States

- Mallori Gibson
- Stephanie Niemer
- Regan Hood Scott
- Taylor Agost

== Notable coaches ==
- (Greece) Giorgos Lykoudis
- (Greece) Giorgos Dermatis
- (Greece) Iraklis Doriadis
- (Greece) Stefanos Polyzos
- (Greece) Giannis Nikolakis
- (Greece) Telis Sotirchos
- (Serbia) Branko Kovačević
- (Italy) Carlo Parisi
- (Italy) Lorenzo Micelli

== See also ==
- Olympiacos Men's Volleyball Team
