= Maria Chatzinikolaou =

Greek volleyball player (born 1978)

Personal information
- Nationality: Greek
- Born: 30 September 1978 (age 48); Orestiada, Greece

Volleyball information
- Position: Middle-blocker

National team
Greece

Maria Chatzinikolaou (born 30 September 1978) is a Greek female volleyball player, playing as a middle-blocker. She was part of the Greece women's national volleyball team. She competed at the 2001 Women's European Volleyball Championship.

== Clubs ==
- Olympiacos (2006–2009)
