= Evangelia Chatziefraimoglou =

Greek volleyball player (born 1975)

Personal information
- Nationality: Greek
- Born: 29 April 1975 (age 51)

Volleyball information
- Number: 5 (national team)

Career
Years	Teams
2007–2008	Olympiacos

National team
2005	Greece

Evangelia Chatziefraimoglou (born 29 April 1975) is a retired Greek female volleyball player. She was part of the Greece women's national volleyball team.

She won the silver medal at the 2005 Mediterranean Games. She participated in the 2006 FIVB Volleyball Women's World Championship.

At club level, she played most notably for Greek powerhouse Olympiacos Piraeus (2007–2008), with whom she reached the quarter-finals of the 2007-2008 CEV Women's Challenge Cup.
