= Ioanna Vlachou =

Greek volleyball player (born 1981)

Personal information
- Nationality: Greek
- Born: 14 May 1981 (age 45)
- Height: 1.67 m (5 ft 6 in)
- Weight: 63 kg (139 lb)
- Spike: 278 cm (109 in)
- Block: 270 cm (110 in)

Career
Years	Teams
2002-2005; 2006-2010	(Greece) Filathlitikos (Greece) Olympiacos

National team
Greece

Ioanna "Gianna" Vlachou (born 14 May 1981) is a Greek volleyball player. She was part of the Greece women's national volleyball team. She competed with the national team at the 2004 Summer Olympics in Athens, Greece. She played most notably for Olympiacos and Filathlitikos.

== Clubs ==
• 1991-2002 Aias evosmou

• 2002-2005 Filathlitikos Thessaloniki

• 2005-2006 Apollonios Keratsiniou

• 2006-2010 Olympiacos

• 2010-2011 SAAK Anatolia

== See also ==
- Greece at the 2004 Summer Olympics
