= Vaia Dirva =

Greek volleyball player (born 1977)

Personal information
- Nationality: Greek
- Born: 22 April 1977 (age 49)
- Height: 1.88 m (6 ft 2 in)

Volleyball information
- Position: middle blocker

Career
- Years: Team
- 2000-2004 2008-2009: EA Larisas; Olympiacos

National team
- Years: Team
- –: Greece

Vaia Dirva (born 22 April 1977) is a retired Greek female volleyball player, who played as a middle blocker. She was part of the Greece women's national volleyball team at the 2002 FIVB Volleyball Women's World Championship in Germany. On club level, she played most notably for Olympiacos.
