= Eirini Kokkinaki =

Greek volleyball player

Personal information
- Nationality: Greece
- Born: June 6, 1996 (age 30); Athens, Greece
- Height: 1.74 m (5 ft 9 in)
- Weight: 70 kg (150 lb)
- Spike: 255 cm (100 in)
- Block: 250 cm (98 in)

Volleyball information
- Position: Libero
- Current club: Olympiacos S.F Piraeus
- Number: 12 (club)

Career
Years	Teams
2007–2012; 2002–2013; 2013–2021; 2021-2024	(Greece) Olympiacos S.F. Piraeus (Greece) D.A.S. Drapetsonas (Greece) Olympiacos S.F. Piraeus (United Kingdom) Newcastle knights

National team
(Greece) Hellas - 3 caps (05.2018)
- Last updated: 21 September 2024

Eirini Kokkinaki (Greek: Ειρήνη Κοκκινάκη; born June 6, 1996, in Athens, Greece) is a female professional volleyball player from Greece, who is a member of the Greece women's national volleyball team. At club level, she played in Hellenic Volley League for Greek powerhouse Olympiacos Piraeus from July 2013 till May 2021. Then she traveled to England and played for three years for Newcastle knights.
Her brother Menelaos Kokkinakis is a volleyball player too.

== Sporting achievements ==
=== International competitions ===
CEV Women's Challenge Cup

- 2017 CEV Women's Challenge Cup, with Olympiacos Piraeus
- 2018 CEV Women's Challenge Cup, with Olympiacos Piraeus

=== National championships ===
- 2013/2014 Hellenic Championship, with Olympiacos Piraeus
- 2014/2015 Hellenic Championship, with Olympiacos Piraeus
- 2015/2016 Hellenic Championship, with Olympiacos Piraeus
- 2016/2017 Hellenic Championship, with Olympiacos Piraeus
- 2017/2018 Hellenic Championship, with Olympiacos Piraeus
- 2018/2019 Hellenic Championship, with Olympiacos Piraeus

=== National cups ===
- 2013/2014 Hellenic Cup, with Olympiacos Piraeus
- 2014/2015 Hellenic Cup, with Olympiacos Piraeus
- 2015/2016 Hellenic Cup, with Olympiacos Piraeus
- 2016/2017 Hellenic Cup, with Olympiacos Piraeus
- 2017/2018 Hellenic Cup, with Olympiacos Piraeus
- 2018/2019 Hellenic Cup, with Olympiacos Piraeus

=== Individuals ===
- 2018/19 Hellenic Championship - 9th day: M.V.P
