= Maria Plagiannakou =

Greek volleyball player (born 1978)

Personal information
- Nationality: Greek
- Born: 12 April 1978 (age 48)

Volleyball information
- Position: Outside hitter

National team
Greece

Maria Plagiannakou (born 12 April 1978) is a retired Greek female volleyball player. She was part of the Greece women's national volleyball team. She won the silver medal at the 2005 Mediterranean Games. She played most notably for Olympiacos.
