= Radosveta Teneva =

Bulgarian volleyball player (born 1980)

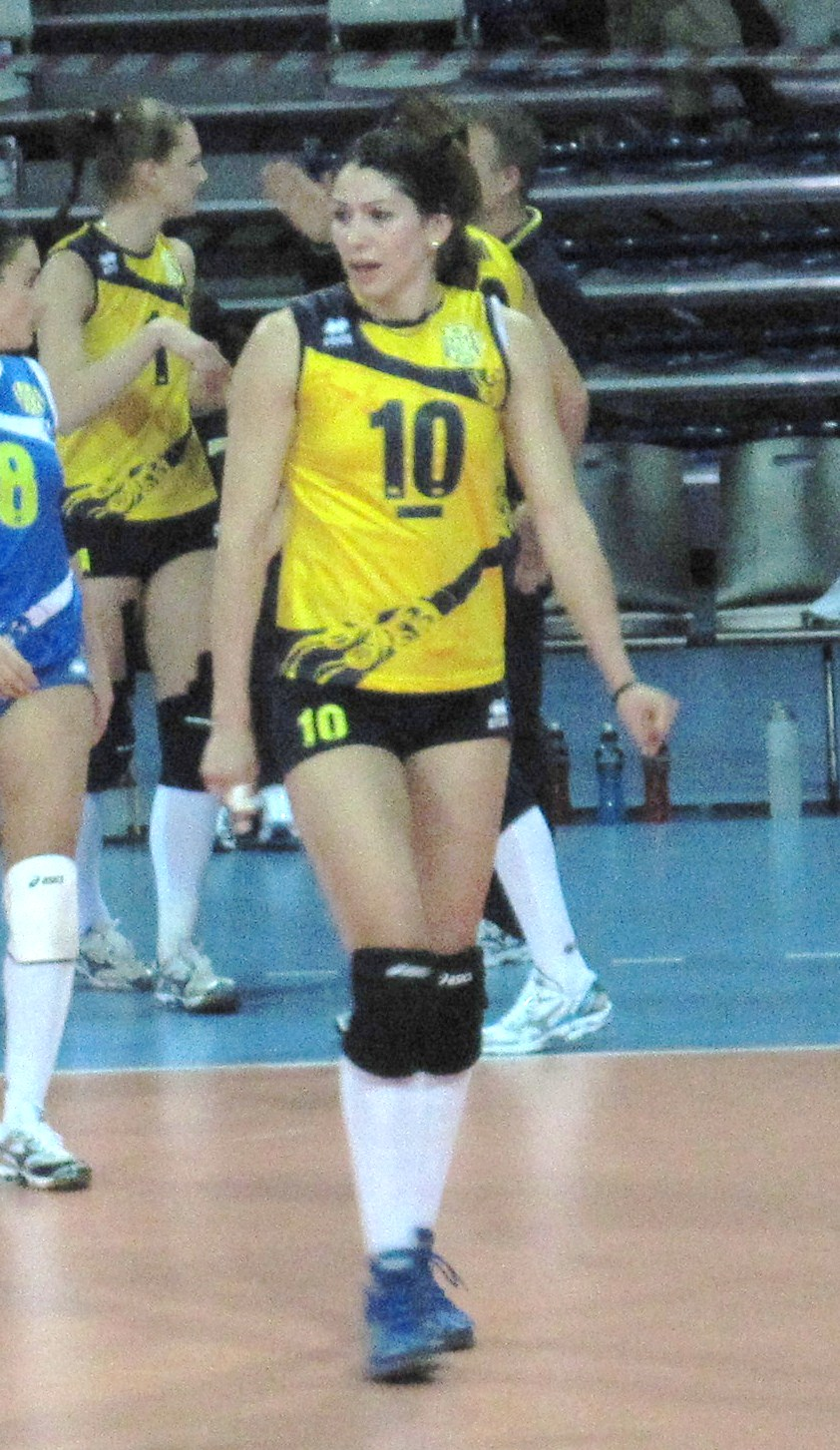

Personal information
- Nationality: Bulgarian
- Born: 21 November 1980 (age 45)
- Height: 1.83 m (6 ft 0 in)

Volleyball information
- Position: wing spiker

National team
Bulgaria

Radosveta Teneva (Bulgarian: Радосвета Тенева) (born 21 November 1980) is a Bulgarian female volleyball player, who played as a wing spiker.

She was part of the Bulgaria women's national volleyball team at the 2002 FIVB Volleyball Women's World Championship in Germany. She also played at the 2007 Women's European Volleyball Championship, and 2009 Women's European Volleyball Championship. On club level she played for Olympiacos.
