= Greek Women's Volleyball Super Cup =

Volleyball competition

Greek Women’s Volleyball Super Cup
- Sport: Volleyball
- Founded: 2012
- No. of teams: 2
- Country: Greece
- Most recent champion: Panionios (2026)
- Most titles: Panionios (2)

The Greek Women's Volleyball Super Cup is a volleyball club competition held in Greece since 2012. It is an annual match contested between the Champions of the Greek Volleyleague and the Cup Winners.

== Short history ==
The first edition took place in 2012 between AEK Athens (2012 Champions) and Olympiacos (2012 Cup Winners). The match was held in the gymnasium in Elassona, where AEK emerged as the winners. Sonia Borovincek, a player for AEK, was named MVP of the match. The competition was not held in the following seven years, as Olympiacos won both the league and the cup, achieving the Double. It was also not held in the next four years, either because Panathinaikos achieved the double, or for other reasons (e.g. due to the Covid-19 Pandemic).
The competition returned in 2024 with Olympiacos as the winners. In the 2025 edition, Panionios (Hellenic Cup finalists) defeated Olympiacos (Champions and Cup winners), winning the first ever volleyball title in club's history.

== The finals ==
| year | Champion | score | Cup's winner | sets | place | MVP | source |
|---|---|---|---|---|---|---|---|
| 2012 | AEK Athens | 3–1 | Olympiacos Piraeus | 25-18, 10-25, 25-23, 25-17 | Elassona | Sonja Borovinšek | |
| 2013 - 2019 | Olympiacos Piraeus won the Double | | | | | | |
| 2020 - 2021 | Not conducted | | | | | | |
| 2022 | Panathinaikos won the Double | | | | | | |
| 2023 | Not conducted | | | | | | |
| 2024 | Panathinaikos | 1–3 | Olympiacos Piraeus | 16–25, 25–22, 21–25, 22–25 | Petroupoli | Milica Kubura | |
| 2025 | Olympiacos Piraeus | 2–3 | Panionios | 22–25, 25-23, 26-24, 19–25, 12–15 | Kifissia | Katerina Zakchaiou | |

== Performance by club ==
| Club | Winners | Runners-up |
|---|---|---|
| Olympiacos | 1 | 2 |
| AEK Athens | 1 | |
| Panionios G.S.S. | 2 | |
| Panathinaikos | | 2 |
