= 2016–17 CEV Women's Challenge Cup =

- League: CEV Women's Challenge Cup
- Sport: Volleyball
- Duration: 14 December 2016 – 15 April 2017
- Number of matches: 62 (including 2 awarded)
- Number of teams: 32

Finals
- Champions: (Turkey) Bursa BBSK (2nd title)
- Runners-up: (Greece) Olympiacos Piraeus
- Finals MVP: (Turkey) Özge Kırdar

CEV Women's Challenge Cup seasons
- ← 2015–16 2017–18 →

The 2016–17 CEV Women's Challenge Cup was the 37th edition of the European Challenge Cup volleyball club tournament, the former "CEV Cup".

== Format ==
The tournament was played on a knockout format, with 32 teams participating. On 30 June 2016, a drawing of lots in Varna, Bulgaria, determined the team's pairing for each match. Each team plays a home and an away match with result points awarded for each leg (3 points for 3–0 or 3–1 wins, 2 points for 3–2 win, 1 point for 2–3 loss). After two legs, the team with the most result points advances to the next round. In case the teams are tied after two legs, a Golden Set is played immediately at the completion of the second leg. The Golden Set winner is the team that first obtains 15 points, provided that the points difference between the two teams is at least 2 points (thus, the Golden Set is similar to a tiebreak set in a normal match).

== Participating teams ==
- Drawing of lots for the 32 participating team was held in Varna, Bulgaria on 30 June 2016.

Rank	Country	Vacancies	Qualified teams
1	Turkey	2	Bursa BBSK
1	Turkey	2	Çanakkale BK
2	Russia	1	Yenisei Krasnoyarsk
5	France	1	ASPTT Mulhouse
7	Germany	1	Schweriner SC
8	Switzerland	1	Viteos Neuchâtel Université
9	Romania	2	CSM București
9	Romania	2	Ştiinţa Bacău
10	Czech Republic	2	Královo Pole Brno
10	Czech Republic	2	TJ Ostrava
12	Belgium	3	Asterix Avo Beveren
12	Belgium	3	Dauphines Charleroi
12	Belgium	3	VC Oudegem
13	Finland	2	LP Kangasala
13	Finland	2	OrPo Orivesi
16	Greece	2	AON Pannaxiakos Naxos
16	Greece	2	Olympiacos Piraeus
17	Austria	3	PSVBG Salzburg
17	Austria	3	UVC Holding Graz
17	Austria	3	VB Niederösterreich Post SV
21	Norway	1	Randaberg IL
22	Croatia	2	Marina Kaštela
22	Croatia	2	OK Poreč
24	Hungary	1	Vasas Óbuda Budapest
25	Spain	2	CV Haris Tenerife
25	Spain	2	Naturhouse Ciudad de Logroño
26	Slovakia	2	1. BVK Bratislava
26	Slovakia	2	Slávia EU Bratislava
27	Cyprus	1	AEL Limassol
30	Bulgaria	1	Levski Sofia
34	Kosovo	1	KV Skenderaj
34	Portugal	1	AVC Famalicão

== Main phase ==
=== 16th Final ===
- 1st leg (Team #1 home) 14–15 December 2016
- 2nd leg (Team #2 home) 10–12 January 2017

Match#	Team #1	Results	Team #2
1	Ştiinţa Bacău (Romania)	1 – 3; 1 – 3	(Turkey) Bursa BBSK
2*	Slávia EU Bratislava (Slovakia)	3 – 1; 3 – 1	(Austria) UVC Holding Graz
3	Naturhouse Ciudad de Logroño (Spain)	3 – 0; 3 – 1	(Portugal) AVC Famalicão
4	CV Haris Tenerife (Spain)	1 – 3; 3 – 2	(Belgium) Dauphines Charleroi
5	VC Oudegem (Belgium)	0 – 3; 0 – 3	(Switzerland) Viteos Neuchâtel Université
6	AEL Limassol (Cyprus)	3 – 0; 1 – 3 Golden Set: 15–5	(Slovakia) 1. BVK Bratislava
7	Randaberg IL (Norway)	0 – 3; 0 – 3	(Finland) LP Kangasala
8	OrPo Orivesi (Finland)	0 – 3; 0 – 3	(Germany) Schweriner SC
9*	Asterix Avo Beveren (Belgium)	3 – 1; 3 – 1	(France) ASPTT Mulhouse
10	KV Skenderaj (Kosovo)	1 – 3; 0 – 3	(Hungary) Vasas Óbuda Budapest
11	Çanakkale BK (Turkey)	3 – 0; 3 – 0	(Bulgaria) Levski Sofia
12	Olympiacos Piraeus (Greece)	3 – 0; 3 – 0	(Romania) CSM București
13	OK Poreč (Croatia)	0 – 3; 0 – 3	(Czech Republic) TJ Ostrava
14	Královo Pole Brno (Czech Republic)	3 – 0; 3 – 1	(Austria) VB Niederösterreich Post SV
15	Marina Kaštela (Croatia)	3 – 2; 3 – 0	(Austria) PSVBG Salzburg
16*	AON Pannaxiakos Naxos (Greece)	0 – 3; 0 – 3	(Russia) Yenisei Krasnoyarsk

*Notes:

- Match# 2 – The second leg was played on 17 January 2017.
- Match# 9 – The order of the fixtures was reversed, the second leg was played in France on 14 December 2016 and the first leg in Belgium on 12 January 2017. The table keeps the order (team 1 and 2) as per draw result.
- Match# 16 – Due to lack of financial resources to travel to Russia, Pannaxiakos withdrew from the competition on 5 December 2016. The CEV awarded both legs to Yenisei Krasnoyarsk.

=== 8th Final ===
- 1st leg (Team #1 home) 24–25 January 2017
- 2nd leg (Team #2 home) 7–9 February 2017

Match#	Team #1	Results	Team #2
17	Slávia EU Bratislava (Slovakia)	0 – 3; 1 – 3	(Turkey) Bursa BBSK
18	Naturhouse Ciudad de Logroño (Spain)	3 – 1; 3 – 0	(Belgium) Dauphines Charleroi
19	Viteos Neuchâtel Université (Switzerland)	3 – 1; 3 – 0	(Cyprus) AEL Limassol
20	Schweriner SC (Germany)	3 – 0; 3 – 0	(Finland) LP Kangasala
21	Asterix Avo Beveren (Belgium)	3 – 1; 3 – 2	(Hungary) Vasas Óbuda Budapest
22	Çanakkale BK (Turkey)	2 – 3; 2 – 3	(Greece) Olympiacos Piraeus
23	TJ Ostrava (Czech Republic)	3 – 0; 3 – 1	(Czech Republic) Královo Pole Brno
24	Yenisei Krasnoyarsk (Russia)	3 – 0; 3 – 0	(Croatia) Marina Kaštela

=== 4th Final ===
- 1st leg (Team #1 home) 22–23 February 2017
- 2nd leg (Team #2 home) 7–9 March 2017

Match#	Team #1	Results	Team #2
25	Naturhouse Ciudad de Logroño (Spain)	1 – 3; 0 – 3	(Turkey) Bursa BBSK
26	Viteos Neuchâtel Université (Switzerland)	0 – 3; 0 – 3	(Germany) Schweriner SC
27	Asterix Avo Beveren (Belgium)	2 – 3; 1 – 3	(Greece) Olympiacos Piraeus
28	TJ Ostrava (Czech Republic)	1 – 3; 0 – 3	(Russia) Yenisei Krasnoyarsk

== Final phase ==
=== Semifinals ===
- 1st leg (Team #1 home) 29 March 2017
- 2nd leg (Team #2 home) 2 April 2017

Match#	Team #1	Results	Team #2
29	Schweriner SC (Germany)	1 – 3; 3 – 2	(Turkey) Bursa BBSK
30	Olympiacos Piraeus (Greece)	3 – 1; 0 – 3 Golden Set: 15–13	(Russia) Yenisei Krasnoyarsk

=== Finals ===
- 1st leg (Team #1 home) 12 April 2017
- 2nd leg (Team #2 home) 15 April 2017

Match#	Team #1	Results	Team #2
31	Olympiacos Piraeus (Greece)	3 – 2; 0 – 3	(Turkey) Bursa BBSK

2016–17 CEV Women's Challenge Cup Champions

Bursa BBSK
2nd title

== Awards ==
Award	Winner	Team
MVP	(Turkey) Özge Kırdar	Bursa BBSK
