= Pannaxiakos V.C. =

Greek volleyball club

- Full name: Pannaxiakos AON Volleyball Club
- Nickname: The Queens of Cyclades, The Queens of the Aegean
- Ground: Municipal Center of Naxos Dimitrios Peristerakis, Naxos
- Chairman: Sofia Vasilaki (Vice-Presidents: Georgios Giannakis, Nikolaos Vafias)
- League: Greek Women’s Volleyball League; CEV Women's Challenge Cup
- Website: Club home page

Uniforms
| Home | Away |

Pannaxiakos V.C. is the volleyball team of the Greek sports club Pannaxiakos A.O.N. It was founded in 2006. The club is based in Naxos. Over the years they have been one of the greatest teams in Cyclades.

The club's victory hour came when the women's team won the A2 League, the second tier of Greek Volleyball taking promotion for the first time in their history for the A1, the top league of Greek Volleyball. The historical achievement is going to be the teams participation to the Final 4 of the Greek Cup.

In the past, was department of Pannaxiakos A.O., when merged in 2006 with A.O. Naxos 2004.

== Women's volleyball team squad ==
Season 2016–2017, as of January 2017.

| No. | Nat. | Position | Player |
|---|---|---|---|
| 5 | (Greece) | Opposite | Olga Vergidou |
| 6 | (Slovenia) | Outside Spiker | Monika Potokar |
| 7 | (Greece) | Libero | Xenia Kakouratou |
| 9 | (Greece) | Setter | Konstantina Drakoulidou |
| 10 | (Greece) | Middle Blocker | Maria Oikonomidou |
| 11 | (Greece) | Outside Hitter | Maria Gatsi |
| 12 | (Greece) | Setter | Viki Seferiadou |
| 13 | (Greece) | Outside Hitter | Sia Totsidou |
| 16 | (Greece) | Middle Blocker | Katerina Zakcheou |
| 19 | (Greece) | Middle Blocker | Varvara Ksagoraraki |
| 18 | (Greece) | Outside Hitter | Vilma Anagnostou |
| -- | (Greece) | Outside Hitter | Katerini Kallia |
| -- | (Greece) | Libero | Ioanna Mavromati |

| Nat. | Coaching Staff | Name |
|---|---|---|
| (Greece) | Head Coach | Giorgos Rousis |
| (Greece) | Technical Director | Dimitris Vitzileos |
| (Greece) | Statistician | Akis Efstathopoulos |

== Honours ==
=== Domestic competitions ===
- A2
  - Winners (1): 2012
- Greek Women's Volleyball Cup
  - Finalists (2): 2014, 2017

=== European competitions ===
- Women's Challenge Cup:
  - Quarter-finals (1): 2011–12
