= 2017–18 CEV Women's Challenge Cup =

- League: CEV Women's Challenge Cup
- Sport: Volleyball
- Duration: 21 November 2017 – 11 April 2018
- Number of teams: 37

Finals
- Champions: (Greece) Olympiacos (1st title)
- Runners-up: (Turkey) Bursa BBSK
- Finals MVP: (Greece) Stella Christodoulou

CEV Women's Challenge Cup seasons
- ← 2016–17 2018–19 →

The 2017–18 CEV Women's Challenge Cup was the 38th edition of the European Challenge Cup volleyball club tournament, the former "CEV Cup".

== Format ==
The tournament is played on a knockout format, with 37 teams participating. Initially 10 teams play a qualification round with the 5 winners advancing to the main phase. On 14 June 2017, a drawing of lots in Luxembourg City, Luxembourg, determined the team's pairing for each match. Each team plays a home and an away match with result points awarded for each leg (3 points for 3–0 or 3–1 wins, 2 points for 3–2 win, 1 point for 2–3 loss). After two legs, the team with the most result points advances to the next round. In case the teams are tied after two legs, a Golden Set is played immediately at the completion of the second leg. The Golden Set winner is the team that first obtains 15 points, provided that the points difference between the two teams is at least 2 points (thus, the Golden Set is similar to a tiebreak set in a normal match).

== Participating teams ==
- Drawing of lots for the 37 participating team was held in Luxembourg City, Luxembourg on 14 June 2017.
- Serbian team Železničar Lajkovac qualified as 2017 BVA Cup winner.

Rank	Country	No. teams			Qualified teams
Rank	Country	Vac	Qual	Total	Qualified teams
1	Turkey	1	-	1	Bursa BBSK
2	Russia	1	-	1	Dinamo Krasnodar
4	Azerbaijan	1	-	1	Azerrail Baku
6	Switzerland	2	-	2	Viteos Neuchâtel Université
6	Switzerland	2	-	2	Sm'Aesch Pfeffingen
8	France	1	-	1	Nantes VB
9	Romania	2	-	2	CSM Târgoviște
9	Romania	2	-	2	Ştiinţa Bacău
10	Czech Republic	1	-	1	TJ Ostrava
11	Serbia	1	1	2	Tent Obrenovac
11	Serbia	1	1	2	Železničar Lajkovac
12	Belgium	1	2	3	Hermes Oostende
12	Belgium	1	2	3	Amigos-Van Pelt Zoersel^{1}
12	Belgium	1	2	3	Sharks Charleroi^{1}
13	Finland	1	1	2	OrPo Orivesi
13	Finland	1	1	2	Pölkky Kuusamo^{1}
16	Greece	1	-	1	Olympiacos Piraeus
19	Hungary	1	-	1	Vasas Óbuda Budapest
21	Austria	1	2	3	Askö Linz-Steg
21	Austria	1	2	3	UVC Holding Graz^{1}
21	Austria	1	2	3	VB NÖ Sokol Schwechat^{1}
22	Croatia	1	1	2	Mladost Zagreb
22	Croatia	1	1	2	ŽOK Osijek^{1}
23	Bosnia and Herzegovina	1	-	1	ŽOK Gacko
24	Spain	1	2	3	CV Barcelona
24	Spain	1	2	3	CV Logroño^{1}
24	Spain	1	2	3	Ibsa CV Las Palmas^{1}
25	Norway	1	-	1	Randaberg IL
27	Luxembourg	1	-	1	RSR Walfer
28	Bulgaria	1	-	1	Levski Sofia
29	Slovakia	1	1	2	1. BVK Bratislava
29	Slovakia	1	1	2	Slávia EU Bratislava^{1}
30	Kosovo	1	-	1	KV Kastrioti Ferizaji
31	Portugal	1	1	2	CK Ponta Delgada
31	Portugal	1	1	2	AVC Famalicão^{1}
36	Denmark	1	-	1	Holte IF
47	Liechtenstein	1	-	1	VBC Galina Schaan

1. Team entering at Qualification round.

== Qualification round ==
- 1st leg (Team #1 home) 21–23 November 2017
- 2nd leg (Team #2 home) 28–30 November 2017

Match#	Team #1	Results	Team #2
1	Slávia EU Bratislava (Slovakia)	1 – 3; 0 – 3	(Austria) UVC Holding Graz
2	ŽOK Osijek (Croatia)	2 – 3; 3 – 2 Golden Set: 16–14	(Austria) VB NÖ Sokol Schwechat
3	Pölkky Kuusamo (Finland)	1 – 3; 0 – 3	(Belgium) Sharks Charleroi
4	AVC Famalicão (Portugal)	0 – 3; 0 – 3	(Spain) CV Logroño
5	Ibsa CV Las Palmas (Spain)	3 – 2; 3 – 1	(Belgium) Amigos-Van Pelt Zoersel

== Main phase ==
=== 16th Finals ===
- 1st leg (Team #1 home) 12–14 December 2017
- 2nd leg (Team #2 home) 9–11 January 2018

Match#	Team #1	Results	Team #2
6	RSR Walfer (Luxembourg)	0 – 3; 0 – 3	(Turkey) Bursa BBSK
7	Sharks Charleroi (Belgium)	3 – 0; 3 – 2	(Spain) CV Barcelona
8	CK Ponta Delgada (Portugal)	1 – 3; 2 – 3	(Belgium) Hermes Oostende
9	Železničar Lajkovac (Serbia)	3 – 1; 0 – 3 Golden Set: 13–15	(Serbia) Tent Obrenovac
10	Randaberg IL (Norway)	0 – 3; 0 – 3	(France) Nantes VB
11	VBC Galina Schaan (Liechtenstein)	1 – 3; 2 – 3	(Hungary) Vasas Óbuda Budapest
12	Ibsa CV Las Palmas (Spain)	3 – 1; 3 – 2	(Austria) Askö Linz-Steg
13	Holte IF (Denmark)	0 – 3; 1 – 3	(Switzerland) Viteos Neuchâtel Université
14	Ştiinţa Bacău (Romania)	3 – 1; 0 – 3 Golden Set: 15–13	(Azerbaijan) Azerrail Baku
15	Sm'Aesch Pfeffingen (Switzerland)	1 – 3; 3 – 0 Golden Set: 15–10	(Croatia) Mladost Zagreb
16	CV Logroño (Spain)	2 – 3; 0 – 3	(Greece) Olympiacos Piraeus
17	Levski Sofia (Bulgaria)	1 – 3; 0 – 3	(Romania) CSM Târgoviște
18	ŽOK Osijek (Croatia)	0 – 3; 0 – 3	(Czech Republic) TJ Ostrava
19	KV Kastrioti Ferizaji (Kosovo)	0 – 3; 0 – 3	(Finland) OrPo Orivesi
20	1. BVK Bratislava (Slovakia)	3 – 0; 3 – 0	(Bosnia and Herzegovina) ŽOK Gacko
21	UVC Holding Graz (Austria)	2 – 3; 0 – 3	(Russia) Dinamo Krasnodar

=== 8th Finals ===
- 1st leg (Team #1 home) 23–25 January 2018
- 2nd leg (Team #2 home) 6–8 February 2018

Match#	Team #1	Results	Team #2
22	Sharks Charleroi (Belgium)	0 – 3; 0 – 3	(Turkey) Bursa BBSK
23	Hermes Oostende (Belgium)	3 – 0; 0 – 3 Golden Set: 15–13	(Serbia) Tent Obrenovac
24	Vasas Óbuda Budapest (Hungary)	2 – 3; 0 – 3	(France) Nantes VB
25	Ibsa CV Las Palmas (Spain)	3 – 0; 1 – 3 Golden Set: 10–15	(Switzerland) Viteos Neuchâtel Université
26	Sm'Aesch Pfeffingen (Switzerland)	2 – 3; 3 – 1	(Romania) Ştiinţa Bacău
27	Olympiacos Piraeus (Greece)	2 – 3; 3 – 1	(Romania) CSM Târgoviște
28	OrPo Orivesi (Finland)	0 – 3; 1 – 3	(Czech Republic) TJ Ostrava
29	Dinamo Krasnodar (Russia)	3 – 0; 3 – 1	(Slovakia) 1. BVK Bratislava

=== 4th Finals ===
- 1st leg (Team #1 home) 20–22 February 2018
- 2nd leg (Team #2 home) 27 February – 1 March 2018

Match#	Team #1	Results	Team #2
30	Hermes Oostende (Belgium)	0 – 3; 0 – 3	(Turkey) Bursa BBSK
31	Viteos Neuchâtel Université (Switzerland)	0 – 3; 1 – 3	(France) Nantes VB
32	Sm'Aesch Pfeffingen (Switzerland)	1 – 3; 0 – 3	(Greece) Olympiacos Piraeus
33	TJ Ostrava (Czech Republic)	1 – 3; 2 – 3	(Russia) Dinamo Krasnodar

== Final phase ==
=== Semifinals ===
- 1st leg (Team #1 home) 14 March 2018
- 2nd leg (Team #2 home) 21 March 2018

Match#	Team #1	Results	Team #2
34	Bursa BBSK (Turkey)	3 – 0; 3 – 0	(France) Nantes VB
35	Olympiacos Piraeus (Greece)	3 – 2; 3 – 0	(Russia) Dinamo Krasnodar

=== Finals ===
- 1st leg (Team #1 home) 4 April 2018
- 2nd leg (Team #2 home) 11 April 2018

Match#	Team #1	Results	Team #2
36	Olympiacos Piraeus (Greece)	2 – 3; 3 – 1	(Turkey) Bursa BBSK

== Final standing ==
Rank	Team
1st place, gold medalist(s)	(Greece) Olympiacos Piraeus
2nd place, silver medalist(s)	(Turkey) Bursa BBSK
Semifinalists	(France) Nantes VB
Semifinalists	(Russia) Dinamo Krasnodar

2017–18 CEV Women's Challenge Cup Champions
(Greece)
Olympiacos Piraeus
1st title

== Awards ==
Award	Winner	Team
MVP	(Greece) Stella Christodoulou	Olympiacos Piraeus
