= Volleyball at the 2004 Summer Olympics – Women's team rosters =

This article shows the rosters of all participating teams at the women's indoor volleyball tournament at the 2004 Summer Olympics in Athens.

== Pool A ==
=== Brazil ===
The following is the Brazilian roster in the women's volleyball tournament of the 2004 Summer Olympics.

Head coach: José Roberto Guimarães

No.	Name	Date of birth	Height	Weight	Spike	Block	2004 club
1	Walewska Oliveira	10 January 1979	1.90 m (6 ft 3 in)	73 kg (161 lb)	310 cm (120 in)	290 cm (110 in)	(Brazil) São Caetano EC
2	Elisângela Oliveira	30 October 1978	1.84 m (6 ft 0 in)	81 kg (179 lb)	302 cm (119 in)	282 cm (111 in)	(Brazil) Paraná VC
3	Erika Coimbra	23 March 1980	1.80 m (5 ft 11 in)	64 kg (141 lb)	301 cm (119 in)	280 cm (110 in)	(Brazil) Finasa Osasco
5	Marianne Steinbrecher	23 August 1983	1.89 m (6 ft 2 in)	70 kg (150 lb)	310 cm (120 in)	290 cm (110 in)	(Brazil) Finasa Osasco
7	Hélia Souza	10 March 1970	1.75 m (5 ft 9 in)	63 kg (139 lb)	283 cm (111 in)	264 cm (104 in)	(Brazil) Paraná VC
8	Valeska Menezes	23 April 1976	1.80 m (5 ft 11 in)	62 kg (137 lb)	302 cm (119 in)	290 cm (110 in)	(Brazil) Finasa Osasco
9	Wélissa Gonzaga	9 September 1982	1.80 m (5 ft 11 in)	76 kg (168 lb)	300 cm (120 in)	287 cm (113 in)	(Brazil) Paraná VC
10	Virna Dias	31 August 1971	1.86 m (6 ft 1 in)	70 kg (150 lb)	306 cm (120 in)	294 cm (116 in)	(Brazil) Minas TC
11	Ana Chagas	18 October 1971	1.79 m (5 ft 10 in)	59 kg (130 lb)	296 cm (117 in)	286 cm (113 in)	(Brazil) Finasa Osasco
14	Fernanda Venturini (c)	24 October 1970	1.80 m (5 ft 11 in)	69 kg (152 lb)	292 cm (115 in)	280 cm (110 in)	(Brazil) Finasa Osasco
15	Arlene Xavier (L)	20 December 1969	1.78 m (5 ft 10 in)	74 kg (163 lb)	299 cm (118 in)	290 cm (110 in)	(Brazil) Minas TC
16	Fabiana Claudino	24 January 1985	1.94 m (6 ft 4 in)	76 kg (168 lb)	314 cm (124 in)	293 cm (115 in)	(Brazil) Minas TC

=== Greece ===
The following is the Greek roster in the women's volleyball tournament of the 2004 Summer Olympics.

Head coach: Dimitrios Floros

No.	Name	Date of birth	Height	Weight	Spike	Block	2004 club
1	Zanna Proniadu	13 December 1978	1.90 m (6 ft 3 in)	82 kg (181 lb)	305 cm (120 in)	300 cm (120 in)	(Greece) Filathlitikos
2	Maria Gkaragkouni (c)	21 December 1975	1.81 m (5 ft 11 in)	79 kg (174 lb)	307 cm (121 in)	290 cm (110 in)	(Greece) Vrilissia
4	Niki Gkaragkouni	12 March 1977	1.85 m (6 ft 1 in)	84 kg (185 lb)	313 cm (123 in)	255 cm (100 in)	(Greece) Panathinaikos
6	Eleni Memetzi	12 January 1975	1.82 m (6 ft 0 in)	70 kg (150 lb)	293 cm (115 in)	287 cm (113 in)	(Greece) Vrilissia
8	Charikleia Sakkoula	18 December 1973	1.80 m (5 ft 11 in)	65 kg (143 lb)	193 cm (76 in)	287 cm (113 in)	(Greece) Panathinaikos
9	Eleftheria Chatzinikou	20 April 1978	1.83 m (6 ft 0 in)	63 kg (139 lb)	288 cm (113 in)	280 cm (110 in)	(Greece) Filathlitikos
10	Ioanna Vlachou (L)	14 May 1981	1.67 m (5 ft 6 in)	63 kg (139 lb)	278 cm (109 in)	270 cm (110 in)	(Greece) Filathlitikos
11	Vasiliki Papazoglou	24 August 1979	1.85 m (6 ft 1 in)	83 kg (183 lb)	299 cm (118 in)	292 cm (115 in)	(Greece) Panellinios
14	Sofia Iordanidou	3 May 1974	1.91 m (6 ft 3 in)	79 kg (174 lb)	304 cm (120 in)	297 cm (117 in)	(Greece) OFA Apollonios
15	Georgia Tzanaki	1 December 1980	1.89 m (6 ft 2 in)	85 kg (187 lb)	278 cm (109 in)	267 cm (105 in)	(Greece) Panellinios
16	Eleni Kiosi	27 February 1985	1.84 m (6 ft 0 in)	69 kg (152 lb)	278 cm (109 in)	267 cm (105 in)	(Greece) Iraklis
18	Rouxantra-Kon Ntoumitreskou	20 April 1977	1.86 m (6 ft 1 in)	71 kg (157 lb)	298 cm (117 in)	287 cm (113 in)	(Greece) Panathinaikos

=== Italy ===
The following is the Italian roster in the women's volleyball tournament of the 2004 Summer Olympics.

Head coach: Marco Bonitta

No.	Name	Date of birth	Height	Weight	Spike	Block	2004 club
2	Simona Rinieri	1 September 1977	1.88 m (6 ft 2 in)	85 kg (187 lb)	307 cm (121 in)	281 cm (111 in)	(France) RC Cannes
3	Elisa Togut	14 May 1978	1.93 m (6 ft 4 in)	70 kg (150 lb)	320 cm (130 in)	295 cm (116 in)	(Italy) Vini Monteschiavo
4	Manuela Leggeri (c)	9 May 1976	1.86 m (6 ft 1 in)	74 kg (163 lb)	312 cm (123 in)	281 cm (111 in)	(Italy) Vini Monteschiavo
8	Jenny Barazza	24 July 1981	1.88 m (6 ft 2 in)	77 kg (170 lb)	300 cm (120 in)	285 cm (112 in)	(Italy) Foppapedretti Bergamo
9	Nadia Centoni	19 June 1981	1.84 m (6 ft 0 in)	63 kg (139 lb)	307 cm (121 in)	291 cm (115 in)	(Italy) Scavolini Pesaro
10	Paola Paggi	6 December 1976	1.82 m (6 ft 0 in)	72 kg (159 lb)	306 cm (120 in)	278 cm (109 in)	(Italy) Foppapedretti Bergamo
11	Francesca Piccinini	10 January 1979	1.84 m (6 ft 0 in)	75 kg (165 lb)	304 cm (120 in)	279 cm (110 in)	(Italy) Foppapedretti Bergamo
12	Manuela Secolo	22 February 1977	1.80 m (5 ft 11 in)	70 kg (150 lb)	302 cm (119 in)	279 cm (110 in)	(Italy) Foppapedretti Bergamo
14	Eleonora Lo Bianco	22 December 1979	1.71 m (5 ft 7 in)	70 kg (150 lb)	287 cm (113 in)	273 cm (107 in)	(Italy) Vini Monteschiavo
15	Antonella Del Core	5 November 1980	1.80 m (5 ft 11 in)	73 kg (161 lb)	296 cm (117 in)	279 cm (110 in)	(Italy) Scavolini Pesaro
16	Francesca Ferretti	15 February 1984	1.79 m (5 ft 10 in)	70 kg (150 lb)	296 cm (117 in)	280 cm (110 in)	(Italy) Volley Modena
17	Paola Cardullo (L)	18 March 1982	1.62 m (5 ft 4 in)	56 kg (123 lb)	275 cm (108 in)	268 cm (106 in)	(Italy) Asystel Novara

=== Japan ===
The following is the Japanese roster in the women's volleyball tournament of the 2004 Summer Olympics.

Head coach: Shoichi Yanagimoto

No.	Name	Date of birth	Height	Weight	Spike	Block	2004 club
1	Tomoko Yoshihara (c)	2 April 1970	1.80 m (5 ft 11 in)	63 kg (139 lb)	305 cm (120 in)	295 cm (116 in)	(Japan) Pioneer Red Wings
2	Chie Tsuji	9 August 1969	1.77 m (5 ft 10 in)	68 kg (150 lb)	298 cm (117 in)	285 cm (112 in)	(Japan) Mobara Alcas
3	Ikumi Narita (L)	1 January 1976	1.73 m (5 ft 8 in)	67 kg (148 lb)	299 cm (118 in)	276 cm (109 in)	(Japan) Hisamitsu Springs
4	Miki Sasaki	15 December 1976	1.82 m (6 ft 0 in)	76 kg (168 lb)	317 cm (125 in)	307 cm (121 in)	(Japan) Pioneer Red Wings
5	Kanako Omura	15 December 1976	1.84 m (6 ft 0 in)	69 kg (152 lb)	319 cm (126 in)	290 cm (110 in)	(Japan) Hisamitsu Springs
7	Yoshie Takeshita	18 March 1978	1.59 m (5 ft 3 in)	55 kg (121 lb)	280 cm (110 in)	270 cm (110 in)	(Japan) JT Marvelous
9	Miyuki Takahashi	25 December 1978	1.70 m (5 ft 7 in)	68 kg (150 lb)	285 cm (112 in)	280 cm (110 in)	(Japan) NEC Red Rockets
12	Sachiko Sugiyama	19 October 1979	1.84 m (6 ft 0 in)	69 kg (152 lb)	310 cm (120 in)	305 cm (120 in)	(Japan) NEC Red Rockets
13	Ai Otomo	24 March 1982	1.83 m (6 ft 0 in)	71 kg (157 lb)	312 cm (123 in)	305 cm (120 in)	(Japan) NEC Red Rockets
14	Kana Oyama	19 June 1984	1.87 m (6 ft 2 in)	82 kg (181 lb)	308 cm (121 in)	287 cm (113 in)	(Japan) Toray Arrows
16	Megumi Kurihara	31 July 1984	1.88 m (6 ft 2 in)	68 kg (150 lb)	305 cm (120 in)	285 cm (112 in)	(Japan) NEC Red Rockets
18	Saori Kimura	19 August 1986	1.82 m (6 ft 0 in)	66 kg (146 lb)	298 cm (117 in)	293 cm (115 in)	(Japan) Shimokitazawa Seitoku

=== Kenya ===
The following is the Kenyan roster in the women's volleyball tournament of the 2004 Summer Olympics.

Head coach: Muge Kibet

No.	Name	Date of birth	Height	Weight	Spike	Block	2004 club
1	Philister Jebet-Sang	12 September 1984	1.85 m (6 ft 1 in)	70 kg (150 lb)	280 cm (110 in)	276 cm (109 in)	(United States) Indian Hills Community College
4	Abigael Tarus	26 August 1981	1.76 m (5 ft 9 in)	67 kg (148 lb)	282 cm (111 in)	261 cm (103 in)	Kenya Pipelines
5	Nancy Nyongesa	18 June 1987	1.70 m (5 ft 7 in)	63 kg (139 lb)	280 cm (110 in)	260 cm (100 in)	(Kenya) Lugulu
6	Catherine Wanjiru	7 August 1978	1.78 m (5 ft 10 in)	80 kg (180 lb)	285 cm (112 in)	265 cm (104 in)	Kenya Pipelines
7	Janet Wanja	24 February 1984	1.75 m (5 ft 9 in)	60 kg (130 lb)	280 cm (110 in)	280 cm (110 in)	Kenya Pipelines
9	Dorcas Nakhomicha	31 March 1971	1.73 m (5 ft 8 in)	70 kg (150 lb)	295 cm (116 in)	285 cm (112 in)	(Kenya) Telkom Volleyball
11	Roselidah Obunaga	23 December 1973	1.80 m (5 ft 11 in)	72 kg (159 lb)	284 cm (112 in)	272 cm (107 in)	(United States) Missouri State University
13	Leonidas Kamende	28 August 1979	1.82 m (6 ft 0 in)	80 kg (180 lb)	291 cm (115 in)	277 cm (109 in)	Kenya Pipelines
14	Violet Barasa (c)	21 June 1975	1.75 m (5 ft 9 in)	68 kg (150 lb)	308 cm (121 in)	295 cm (116 in)	(Greece) Panellinios V.C.
15	Gladys Nasikanda	25 July 1978	1.80 m (5 ft 11 in)	75 kg (165 lb)	290 cm (110 in)	300 cm (120 in)	(United States) Union University
17	Mercy Wesutila (L)	8 March 1976	1.53 m (5 ft 0 in)	75 kg (165 lb)	290 cm (110 in)	300 cm (120 in)	Kenya Pipelines
18	Judith Serenge	21 January 1976	1.53 m (5 ft 0 in)	60 kg (130 lb)	256 cm (101 in)	245 cm (96 in)	Kenya Pipelines

=== South Korea ===
The following is the South Korean roster in the women's volleyball tournament of the 2004 Summer Olympics.

Head coach: Kim Cheol-yong

No.	Name	Date of birth	Height	Weight	Spike	Block	2004 club
1	Lee Jung-ok	19 July 1983	1.79 m (5 ft 10 in)	72 kg (159 lb)	280 cm (110 in)	272 cm (107 in)	(South Korea) LG Caltex Oil
3	Kang Hye-mi	27 April 1974	1.73 m (5 ft 8 in)	62 kg (137 lb)	300 cm (120 in)	285 cm (112 in)	(South Korea) Hyundai E&C
4	Ku Min-jung (c)	25 August 1973	1.81 m (5 ft 11 in)	73 kg (161 lb)	315 cm (124 in)	300 cm (120 in)	(South Korea) Hyundai E&C
5	Kim Sa-nee	21 June 1981	1.80 m (5 ft 11 in)	72 kg (159 lb)	302 cm (119 in)	292 cm (115 in)	(South Korea) Korea Expressway Corporation
6	Choi Kwang-hee	25 May 1974	1.73 m (5 ft 8 in)	73 kg (161 lb)	304 cm (120 in)	289 cm (114 in)	(South Korea) Korea Tobacco & Ginseng
8	Nam Jie-youn (L)	25 May 1983	1.72 m (5 ft 8 in)	63 kg (139 lb)	290 cm (110 in)	278 cm (109 in)	(South Korea) LG Caltex Oil
9	Chang So-yun	11 November 1974	1.84 m (6 ft 0 in)	76 kg (168 lb)	312 cm (123 in)	301 cm (119 in)	(South Korea) Hyundai E&C
11	Kim Mi-jin	22 July 1979	1.82 m (6 ft 0 in)	65 kg (143 lb)	300 cm (120 in)	290 cm (110 in)	(South Korea) Korea Expressway Corporation
12	Pak Sun-mi	3 February 1982	1.78 m (5 ft 10 in)	65 kg (143 lb)	275 cm (108 in)	268 cm (106 in)	(South Korea) Hyundai E&C
13	Jung Dae-young	12 August 1981	1.83 m (6 ft 0 in)	73 kg (161 lb)	315 cm (124 in)	308 cm (121 in)	(South Korea) Hyundai E&C
14	Han Song-yi	5 September 1984	1.85 m (6 ft 1 in)	67 kg (148 lb)	304 cm (120 in)	291 cm (115 in)	(South Korea) Korea Expressway Corporation
15	Kim Se-young	4 June 1981	1.90 m (6 ft 3 in)	71 kg (157 lb)	315 cm (124 in)	300 cm (120 in)	(South Korea) Korea Tobacco & Ginseng

== Pool B ==
=== China ===
The following is the Chinese roster in the women's volleyball tournament of the 2004 Summer Olympics.

Head coach: Chen Zhonghe

No.	Name	Date of birth	Height	Weight	Spike	Block	2004 club
2	Feng Kun (c)	28 December 1978	1.83 m (6 ft 0 in)	75 kg (165 lb)	319 cm (126 in)	310 cm (120 in)	(China) Beijing
3	Yang Hao	21 March 1980	1.83 m (6 ft 0 in)	75 kg (165 lb)	319 cm (126 in)	314 cm (124 in)	(China) Liaoning
4	Liu Yanan	29 September 1980	1.86 m (6 ft 1 in)	73 kg (161 lb)	320 cm (130 in)	313 cm (123 in)	(China) Liaoning
6	Li Shan	21 May 1980	1.85 m (6 ft 1 in)	74 kg (163 lb)	317 cm (125 in)	300 cm (120 in)	(China) Tianjin Bridgestone
7	Zhou Suhong	23 April 1979	1.82 m (6 ft 0 in)	72 kg (159 lb)	313 cm (123 in)	305 cm (120 in)	(China) Zhejiang
8	Zhao Ruirui	8 October 1981	1.98 m (6 ft 6 in)	75 kg (165 lb)	326 cm (128 in)	315 cm (124 in)	(China) Bayi Xuezhongfei
9	Zhang Yuehong	9 November 1975	1.84 m (6 ft 0 in)	73 kg (161 lb)	324 cm (128 in)	322 cm (127 in)	(China) Liaoning
10	Chen Jing	3 September 1975	1.82 m (6 ft 0 in)	75 kg (165 lb)	312 cm (123 in)	306 cm (120 in)	(China) Sichuan
12	Song Nina	7 April 1980	1.79 m (5 ft 10 in)	65 kg (143 lb)	303 cm (119 in)	293 cm (115 in)	(China) Bayi Xuezhongfei
15	Wang Lina	5 February 1978	1.81 m (5 ft 11 in)	75 kg (165 lb)	319 cm (126 in)	300 cm (120 in)	(China) Bayi Xuezhongfei
16	Zhang Na (L)	19 April 1980	1.80 m (5 ft 11 in)	70 kg (150 lb)	302 cm (119 in)	292 cm (115 in)	(China) Tianjin Bridgestone
18	Zhang Ping	23 May 1982	1.87 m (6 ft 2 in)	73 kg (161 lb)	312 cm (123 in)	301 cm (119 in)	(China) Tianjin Bridgestone

=== Cuba ===
The following is the Cuban roster in the women's volleyball tournament of the 2004 Summer Olympics.

Head coach: Luis Felipe Calderón

No.	Name	Date of birth	Height	Weight	Spike	Block	2004 club
1	Yumilka Ruíz (C)	5 August 1978	1.79 m (5 ft 10 in)	62 kg (137 lb)	329 cm (130 in)	315 cm (124 in)	(Cuba) Camagüey
3	Nancy Carrillo	11 January 1986	1.90 m (6 ft 3 in)	74 kg (163 lb)	318 cm (125 in)	315 cm (124 in)	(Cuba) Ciudad de La Habana
5	Maybelis Martínez (L)	13 June 1977	1.78 m (5 ft 10 in)	79 kg (174 lb)	322 cm (127 in)	306 cm (120 in)	(Cuba) Ciudad de La Habana
6	Daimí Ramírez	8 October 1983	1.81 m (5 ft 11 in)	67 kg (148 lb)	305 cm (120 in)	290 cm (110 in)	(Cuba) Camagüey
8	Yaima Ortíz	9 November 1981	1.78 m (5 ft 10 in)	70 kg (150 lb)	325 cm (128 in)	313 cm (123 in)	(Cuba) Ciudad de La Habana
10	Ana Fernández	3 August 1973	1.86 m (6 ft 1 in)	78 kg (172 lb)	325 cm (128 in)	316 cm (124 in)	(Cuba) Sancti Spíritus
11	Liana Mesa	26 December 1977	1.82 m (6 ft 0 in)	70 kg (150 lb)	318 cm (125 in)	307 cm (121 in)	(Cuba) Camagüey
12	Rosir Calderón	28 December 1984	1.89 m (6 ft 2 in)	66 kg (146 lb)	330 cm (130 in)	325 cm (128 in)	(Cuba) Ciudad de La Habana
13	Anniara Muñoz	24 January 1980	1.80 m (5 ft 11 in)	69 kg (152 lb)	320 cm (130 in)	312 cm (123 in)	(Cuba) Cienfuegos
16	Dulce Téllez	12 September 1983	1.86 m (6 ft 1 in)	69 kg (152 lb)	320 cm (130 in)	316 cm (124 in)	Santiago de Cuba
17	Marta Sánchez	17 May 1973	1.84 m (6 ft 0 in)	75 kg (165 lb)	324 cm (128 in)	310 cm (120 in)	(Cuba) Holguín
18	Zoila Barros	6 August 1976	1.87 m (6 ft 2 in)	76 kg (168 lb)	325 cm (128 in)	312 cm (123 in)	(Cuba) Ciudad de La Habana

=== Dominican Republic ===
The following is the Dominican Republic roster in the women's volleyball tournament of the 2004 Summer Olympics.

Head coach: (Cuba) Jorge Garbey

No.	Name	Date of birth	Height	Weight	Spike	Block	2004 club
1	Annerys Vargas	7 August 1982	1.94 m (6 ft 4 in)	70 kg (150 lb)	303 cm (119 in)	298 cm (117 in)	(Dominican Republic) Mirador
3	Yudelkys Bautista	5 December 1974	1.93 m (6 ft 4 in)	68 kg (150 lb)	312 cm (123 in)	308 cm (121 in)	(Dominican Republic) Mirador
5	Evelyn Carrera (L)	10 May 1971	1.82 m (6 ft 0 in)	70 kg (150 lb)	301 cm (119 in)	297 cm (117 in)	(Dominican Republic) Los Prados
6	Alexandra Caso	25 April 1987	1.68 m (5 ft 6 in)	59 kg (130 lb)	243 cm (96 in)	241 cm (95 in)	(Dominican Republic) Mirador
7	Sofía Mercedes	25 May 1976	1.85 m (6 ft 1 in)	70 kg (150 lb)	306 cm (120 in)	298 cm (117 in)	(Dominican Republic) Independencia
8	Juana Saviñón	13 September 1980	1.81 m (5 ft 11 in)	75 kg (165 lb)	303 cm (119 in)	300 cm (120 in)	(Dominican Republic) Evosancris
10	Milagros Cabral	17 October 1978	1.81 m (5 ft 11 in)	63 kg (139 lb)	308 cm (121 in)	305 cm (120 in)	(Dominican Republic) Los Cachorros
11	Juana Miguelina González	3 January 1979	1.85 m (6 ft 1 in)	70 kg (150 lb)	295 cm (116 in)	290 cm (110 in)	(Dominican Republic) Modeca
12	Francia Jackson (C)	11 August 1975	1.68 m (5 ft 6 in)	71 kg (157 lb)	280 cm (110 in)	275 cm (108 in)	(Dominican Republic) Mirador
14	Prisilla Rivera	29 December 1986	1.83 m (6 ft 0 in)	67 kg (148 lb)	309 cm (122 in)	305 cm (120 in)	(Dominican Republic) Deportivo Nacional
15	Cosiri Rodríguez	30 August 1977	1.91 m (6 ft 3 in)	72 kg (159 lb)	313 cm (123 in)	305 cm (120 in)	(Dominican Republic) San Cristobál
16	Kenya Moreta	7 April 1981	1.91 m (6 ft 3 in)	76 kg (168 lb)	310 cm (120 in)	305 cm (120 in)	(Dominican Republic) Mirador

=== Germany ===
The following is the German roster in the women's volleyball tournament of the 2004 Summer Olympics.

Head coach: (South Korea) Lee Hee-wan

No.	Name	Date of birth	Height	Weight	Spike	Block	2004 club
3	Tanja Hart	24 January 1974	1.76 m (5 ft 9 in)	70 kg (150 lb)	291 cm (115 in)	275 cm (108 in)	(Germany) SSV Ulm 1846
4	Kerstin Tzscherlich (L)	15 February 1978	1.79 m (5 ft 10 in)	75 kg (165 lb)	295 cm (116 in)	282 cm (111 in)	(Germany) Dresdner SC
6	Julia Schlecht	16 March 1980	1.82 m (6 ft 0 in)	67 kg (148 lb)	298 cm (117 in)	277 cm (109 in)	(Germany) TSV Bayer 04 Leverkusen
8	Cornelia Dumler	22 January 1982	1.81 m (5 ft 11 in)	69 kg (152 lb)	309 cm (122 in)	285 cm (112 in)	(Germany) TSV Bayer 04 Leverkusen
9	Christina Benecke	14 October 1974	1.90 m (6 ft 3 in)	80 kg (180 lb)	314 cm (124 in)	291 cm (115 in)	(Germany) TV Fischbek
11	Christiane Fürst	29 March 1985	1.92 m (6 ft 4 in)	74 kg (163 lb)	305 cm (120 in)	291 cm (115 in)	(Germany) Dresdner SC
12	Olessya Kulakova	31 January 1977	1.90 m (6 ft 3 in)	70 kg (150 lb)	315 cm (124 in)	298 cm (117 in)	(Germany) Schweriner SC
13	Atika Bouagaa	22 May 1982	1.84 m (6 ft 0 in)	69 kg (152 lb)	306 cm (120 in)	289 cm (114 in)	(Italy) Volley Modena
14	Kathy Radzuweit	2 March 1982	1.96 m (6 ft 5 in)	72 kg (159 lb)	319 cm (126 in)	300 cm (120 in)	(Germany) TSV Bayer 04 Leverkusen
15	Angelina Grün (c)	2 December 1979	1.85 m (6 ft 1 in)	67 kg (148 lb)	309 cm (122 in)	287 cm (113 in)	(Italy) Foppapedretti Bergamo
16	Judith Sylvester	13 October 1977	1.93 m (6 ft 4 in)	85 kg (187 lb)	312 cm (123 in)	296 cm (117 in)	(Italy) Properzi Volley Lodi
17	Birgit Thumm	3 July 1980	1.84 m (6 ft 0 in)	70 kg (150 lb)	310 cm (120 in)	289 cm (114 in)	(Germany) Rote Raben Vilsbiburg

=== Russia ===
The following is the Russian roster in the women's volleyball tournament of the 2004 Summer Olympics.

Head coach: Nikolay Karpol

No.	Name	Date of birth	Height	Weight	Spike	Block	2004 club
2	Irina Tebenikhina	5 December 1978	1.89 m (6 ft 2 in)	76 kg (168 lb)	308 cm (121 in)	299 cm (118 in)	(Russia) Uralochka Ekaterinburg
4	Elena Tyurina (L)	12 April 1971	1.84 m (6 ft 0 in)	82 kg (181 lb)	297 cm (117 in)	286 cm (113 in)	(Russia) Uralochka Ekaterinburg
5	Lioubov Shashkova	4 December 1977	1.92 m (6 ft 4 in)	76 kg (168 lb)	308 cm (121 in)	304 cm (120 in)	(Italy) Volley Bergamo
7	Natalya Safronova	6 February 1979	1.88 m (6 ft 2 in)	69 kg (152 lb)	300 cm (120 in)	293 cm (115 in)	(Russia) Uralochka Ekaterinburg
8	Yevgeniya Artamonova (C)	17 July 1975	1.92 m (6 ft 4 in)	76 kg (168 lb)	315 cm (124 in)	306 cm (120 in)	(Russia) Uralochka Ekaterinburg
9	Elizaveta Tishchenko	7 February 1975	1.90 m (6 ft 3 in)	75 kg (165 lb)	309 cm (122 in)	302 cm (119 in)	(Russia) Uralochka Ekaterinburg
10	Olga Chukanova	9 June 1980	1.80 m (5 ft 11 in)	76 kg (168 lb)	305 cm (120 in)	294 cm (116 in)	(Russia) Uralochka Ekaterinburg
11	Yekaterina Gamova	17 October 1980	2.04 m (6 ft 8 in)	80 kg (180 lb)	321 cm (126 in)	310 cm (120 in)	(Russia) Uralochka Ekaterinburg
12	Marina Sheshenina	26 June 1985	1.78 m (5 ft 10 in)	62 kg (137 lb)	289 cm (114 in)	277 cm (109 in)	(Russia) Uralochka Ekaterinburg
13	Alexandra Korukovets	1 October 1976	1.86 m (6 ft 1 in)	74 kg (163 lb)	305 cm (120 in)	302 cm (119 in)	(Russia) Universitet Belgorod
14	Elena Plotnikova	26 July 1978	1.85 m (6 ft 1 in)	73 kg (161 lb)	306 cm (120 in)	298 cm (117 in)	(Russia) Uralochka Ekaterinburg
16	Olga Nikolaeva	14 May 1972	1.87 m (6 ft 2 in)	74 kg (163 lb)	306 cm (120 in)	302 cm (119 in)	(Russia) Leningradka St. Petersburg

=== United States ===
The following is the American roster in the women's volleyball tournament of the 2004 Summer Olympics.

Head coach: (Japan) Toshi Yoshida

No.	Name	Date of birth	Height	Weight	Spike	Block	2004 club
1	Prikeba Phipps	30 June 1969	1.91 m (6 ft 3 in)	80 kg (180 lb)	319 cm (126 in)	303 cm (119 in)	(Brazil) Minas Tênis Clube
2	Danielle Scott	1 October 1972	1.88 m (6 ft 2 in)	83 kg (183 lb)	325 cm (128 in)	302 cm (119 in)	(Italy) Pallavolo Chieri
3	Tayyiba Haneef	23 March 1979	2.00 m (6 ft 7 in)	81 kg (179 lb)	328 cm (129 in)	312 cm (123 in)	Unattached
4	Lindsey Berg	16 July 1980	1.73 m (5 ft 8 in)	74 kg (163 lb)	287 cm (113 in)	274 cm (108 in)	Unattached
5	Stacy Sykora (L)	24 June 1977	1.75 m (5 ft 9 in)	58 kg (128 lb)	305 cm (120 in)	295 cm (116 in)	(Italy) Olimpia Teodora Ravenna
6	Elisabeth Bachman	7 November 1978	1.92 m (6 ft 4 in)	85 kg (187 lb)	311 cm (122 in)	300 cm (120 in)	Unattached
7	Heather Bown	29 November 1978	1.88 m (6 ft 2 in)	88 kg (194 lb)	301 cm (119 in)	290 cm (110 in)	(Italy) Pallavolo Modena
9	Ogonna Nnamani	29 July 1983	1.83 m (6 ft 0 in)	77 kg (170 lb)	315 cm (124 in)	305 cm (120 in)	(United States) Stanford University
11	Robyn Ah Mow-Santos (c)	15 September 1975	1.72 m (5 ft 8 in)	68 kg (150 lb)	291 cm (115 in)	281 cm (111 in)	Unattached
12	Nancy Metcalf	12 November 1978	1.84 m (6 ft 0 in)	74 kg (163 lb)	314 cm (124 in)	292 cm (115 in)	(Italy) Despar Perugia
13	Tara Cross-Battle	16 September 1968	1.81 m (5 ft 11 in)	76 kg (168 lb)	302 cm (119 in)	301 cm (119 in)	Unattached
15	Logan Tom	25 May 1981	1.84 m (6 ft 0 in)	74 kg (163 lb)	306 cm (120 in)	297 cm (117 in)	(Italy) Gianno Pierallsi
