= Eleftheria Hatzinikou =

Cypriot volleyball player (born 1978)

Personal information
- Nationality: Greece
- Born: 20 April 1978 (age 48); Larissa, Greece
- Height: 1.83 m (6 ft 0 in)
- Weight: 63 kg (139 lb)
- Spike: 288 cm (113 in)
- Block: 280 cm (110 in)

Volleyball information
- Position: Setter

Career
Years	Teams
1994–2002; 2002–2004; 2004–2006; 2006–2007; 2007–2011	(Greece) EA Larissa (Greece) AO Markopoulo (Greece) Filathlitikos Thessaloniki (Greece) Olympiacos Piraeus (Greece) Panathinaikos AO

National team
2004	Greece
- Last updated: 22 May 2026

Eleftheria Hatzinikou (born 20 April 1978) was a Greek female volleyball player. She was part of the Greece women's national volleyball team.

She competed with the national team at the 2002 FIVB Volleyball Women's World Championship in Germany, and at the 2004 Summer Olympics in Athens, Greece.

== Sporting achievements ==
=== International competitions ===
- 2008/2009: CEV Women's Challenge Cup, with Panathinaikos

=== National championships ===
- 2004/2005 Hellenic Championship, with Filathlitikos Thessaloniki
- 2006/2007 Hellenic Championship, with Olympiacos Piraeus
- 2007/2008 Hellenic Championship, with Panathinaikos
- 2008/2009 Hellenic Championship, with Panathinaikos
- 2009/2010 Hellenic Championship, with Panathinaikos
- 2010/2011 Hellenic Championship, with Panathinaikos

=== National cups ===
- 2007/2008 Hellenic Cup, with Panathinaikos
- 2008/2009 Hellenic Cup, with Panathinaikos
- 2009/2010 Hellenic Cup, with Panathinaikos

== See also ==
- Greece at the 2004 Summer Olympics
