= Eva Chantava =

Greek volleyball player

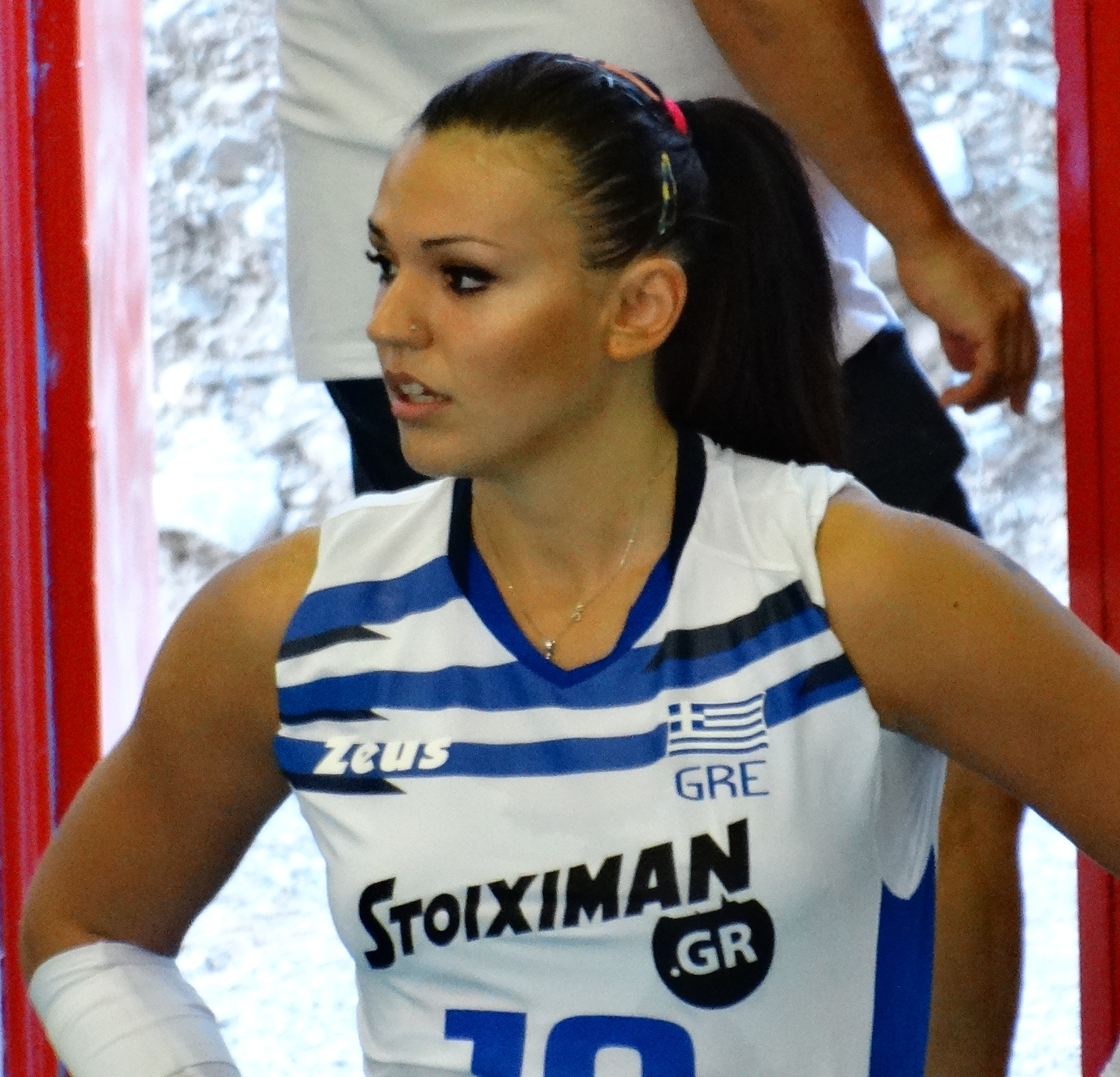

Personal information
- Full name: Evangelia Chantava
- Nationality: Greek
- Born: 26 October 1990 (age 36)
- Hometown: Grevena, Greece
- Height: 188 cm (6 ft 2 in)
- Spike: 305 cm (120 in)
- Block: 288 cm (113 in)

Volleyball information
- Position: Outside hitter
- Current club: Panionios V.C.
- Number: 12

Career
Years	Teams
2005–2009	(Greece) Iraklis Thessaloniki
2009–2011	(Greece) Olympiacos Piraeus
2011–2012	(Italy) Terre Verdiane Fondanellato
2012–2013	(Turkey) Karşıyaka
2013–2014	(Greece) Vrilissia
2014	(Thailand) 3BB Nakornnont
2014–2015	(Azerbaijan) Lokomotiv Baku
2015–2016	(Romania) CSM Târgoviște
2016–2017	(Brazil) Fluminense
2018	(Indonesia) Bandung Bank BJB Pakuan
2018–2020	(Greece) PAOK
2020–2022	(Greece) Panathinaikos
2022–2024	(Japan) Gunma Green Wings
2024	(Greece) AEK Athens
2024	(Indonesia) Bandung BJB Tandamata
2025	(Thailand) Nakhon Ratchasima Qmin C VC

National team
2006–2022	Greece

Evangelia Chantava (Greek: Ευαγγελία "Εύα" Χαντάβα; born 26 October 1990) is a Greek female professional volleyball player.

== Career ==
She was born in Grevena and started her volleyball career at the age of 7 playing for her hometown's club, Grevena G.C. In 2005 at the age of 15, Chantava took the first big step in her career, when suddenly from playing against local teams, she found herself competing in the A1 league with Iraklis Thessaloniki (2005–2009) alongside great athletes. While she was playing for Iraklis she took the opportunity at the age of 16 to play with the Greece women's national volleyball team for the first time.

After that and for the next two seasons (2009–11) she signed a contract with Olympiacos. On 16 April 2011, they won the Greek Cup, the first trophy for the women's club. Chantava was voted most valuable player. She then signed with Terre Verdiane Fontanellato (Italian 2nd league) for the 2011–2012 season. For the next season, she moved to Izmir and signed a one-year-contract (2012–2013) with Karşıyaka (Turkish 2nd league), and her team qualified for the final four of the Turkish cup, the first time in history of Turkish volleyball that a team from second division beat a team from first division and they played the final four of Turkish cup against Vakıfbank, Galatasaray and Eczacıbaşı. They took the 4th place. For the next season she turned back in Greece for the team of Nargile Vrilissia (1st division-Greece) and with very good performances she took the MVP of the year 2013–2014. After that, she signed for Lokomotiv Baku (1st division-Azerbaijan).

== Titles ==
=== National cups ===
- 2010/2011 Greek Cup, with Olympiacos Piraeus
- 2015/2016 Romanian Cup, with CSM Târgoviște
- 2021/2022 Greek Cup, with Panathinaikos
- 2021/2022 Greek League, with Panathinaikos

== Awards ==
- (2016) Cup Winner (1st place) of Romanian Championship with CSM Targoviste
- (2014) Most Valuable Player award for the championship – Nargile F.O. (Greece)
- (2011) First place in Greek Final Cup with Olympiacos – Most Valuable Player award
- (2009) Second place in Greek Final Cup with Iraklis Thessalonikis – Most Valuable Player award for the Women's All Star Game
- (2006) 8th place in the World School Championship Federation in Porec of Croatia
- (2005–2008) Three school championships with Aristotelio College
- (2005–2009) Two U19 girls and one U17 Greek Championship
