= Yuliya Saltsevich =

Russian volleyball player

Personal information
- Full name: Yuliya Aleksandrovna Saltsevich
- Nationality: Russia
- Born: 12 May 1967 (age 59) Riga, Latvian SSR
- Height: 1.97 m (6 ft 5 1/2 in)

Volleyball information

Career
- Years: Team
- 1983–1988: CSKA Moscow
- 1992–1993: Panathinaikos Athens
- 1993–1995: Olympiacos Piraeus
- 1995–1997: Panathinaikos Athens
- 1999–2005: Filathlitikos Thessaloniki
Honours
Women's volleyball
Representing the Soviet Union
European Championship
Gold medal – first place	1985 Netherlands	Team competition
Goodwill Games
Gold medal – first place	1986 Moscow	Team competition

Yuliya Aleksandrovna Saltsevich (Russian: Ю́лия Алекса́ндровна Салце́вич; born May 12, 1967, in Riga, Latvian SSR) is a retired Russian female volleyball player who was a member of the USSR women's volleyball team from 1985 to 1986. She was a member of the Soviet squad that won the gold medal at the 1985 European Championship in Netherlands and the gold medal at the 1986 Goodwill Games in Moscow. She was also part of the Soviet team that took the 6th place in the 1986 World Championship in Prague.

On club level, Saltsevich played for CSKA Moscow from 1983 to 1988, winning 1 CEV Champions Cup (1985–86), 1 CEV Cup Winners' Cup (1987–88), 1 USSR Championship (1984–85) and 1 USSR Cup (1984). She was also part of the Moscow team that won the gold medal at the 1986 Spartakiad of Peoples of the USSR. In 1988, Saltsevich suffered a very serious spinal injury that kept her out of action for four years. Nevertheless, she fully recovered and enjoyed a successful career in Greece where she played for Panathinaikos (1992–1993, 1995–1996), Olympiacos (1993–1995) and Filathlitikos (1999–2005), winning 2 Greek Championships.

After her retirement in 2005, she became a volleyball coach. She coached Filathlitikos (2005–2006) and SDUSHOR-65 Nika (2007–2009) and in 2009 she became head coach of Anorthosis Famagusta. Under her guidance, Anorthosis won the Cypriot Championship and the Cypriot Cup in 2009–10 season.

== Sporting achievements ==
=== Player ===
==== Clubs ====
- CEV Champions Cup
  - 1985/1986 with CSKA Moscow
- CEV Cup Winners' Cup
  - 1987/1988 with CSKA Moscow
- USSR Championship
  - 1984–85 with CSKA Moscow
- USSR Cup
  - 1984 with CSKA Moscow
- Greek Championship
  - 1992–93 with Panathinaikos
  - 2002–03

==== National team ====
- European Championship
  - 1985
- Goodwill Games
  - 1986

=== Coach ===
- Cyprus Championship
  - 2009–10 with Anorthosis Famagusta
- Cyprus Cup
  - 2009–10 with Anorthosis Famagusta
