= Stella Christodoulou =

Greek volleyball player

Personal information
- Full name: Styliani Christodoulou
- Nationality: Greece
- Born: July 19, 1991 (age 35); Athens, Greece
- Height: 1.85 m (6 ft 1 in)
- Weight: 80 kg (180 lb)
- Spike: 285 cm (112 in)
- Block: 275 cm (108 in)

Volleyball information
- Position: Setter
- Current club: (Greece) AO Thiras
- Number: 14 (club and national team)

Career
Years	Teams
2000–2007; 2007–2010; 2011–2020; 2021; 2021–2023; 2023–	(Greece) Enosi Vyrona Athens (Greece) Panellinios G.S. Athens (Greece) Olympiacos S.F. Piraeus (Turkey) Aydın Büyükşehir Belediyespor (Greece) Olympiacos S.F. Piraeus (Greece) AO Thiras

National team
(Greece) Hellas - 93 caps (05.2018)
- Last updated: 30 October 2023

Stella Christodoulou (Greek: Στέλλα Χριστοδούλου; born July 19, 1991, in Athens, Greece) is a female professional volleyball player from Greece, who is a member of the Greece women's national volleyball team. At club level, she plays in Hellenic Volley League for Greek club AO Thiras.

== Career ==
Stella Christodoulou started her career from Enosi Virona. In 2007 she was transferred at Panellinios G.S. Athens. In 2010, she signed for Panathinaikos Athens, but Panellinios blocked her transfer at Sports Court. Christodoulou was inactive during 2010–11 season. In 2011 she was transferred to Olympiacos Piraeus. Since her arrival at the red-whites of Piraeus, Christodoulou has won 7 Hellenic Championships, 8 Hellenic Cups, the silver medal of the 2016–17 CEV Women's Challenge Cup but mainly the golden medal of the same competition in 2017-18 season.

In atomic level she has been named two times Hellenic Championship MVP, in 2016–17 and 2018–19 seasons and two more times Hellenic Cup MVP in 2014 and 2019 editions. However, her most important individual award was the European Challenge Cup MVP, in the 2018 edition of the competition.

Stella Christooulou, who is considered to be one of the ever best setters in the Hellenic women's volleyball, renewed her contract with the Piraeus team in June 2020, for two more years. In December 2020 the Hellenic championship was uncertain whether it would continue due to COVID-19 disease and Olympiacos allowed their players (despite their contracts) to move abroad until next summer. Thus, Stella Christooulou moved to Turkish "Sultanlar Ligi" for Aydın Büyükşehir Belediyespor, where she met her compatriot Anthi Vassilantonaki.

== International career ==
Stella Christodoulou is a member of the Hellenic National Team. She began her international career in 2007 with the Junior (U19) team, competing in the preliminary round of 2008 Junior Women's European Championship. One year later she was promoted to the Women's squad, participating in the preliminary rounds of the 2009 Women's European Volleyball Championship. Since then she has many caps with the National team, of which she is the captain, since May 2017. In 2018 Mediterranean Games she won the silver medal as the captain of the Hellenic National Team. In 2019, she was the captain of the Hellenic National Team in the final phase of the European Championship, participating in all 6 games of Greece.

== Personal ==
Stella is the daughter of Christos Christodoulou, and niece of Fanis Christodoulou. Her sister Elena is also a volleyball player. Christodoulou family has hails from Rozena Korinthia.

== Sporting achievements ==
=== National team ===
- 2018 Mediterranean Games

=== Clubs ===
==== International competitions ====
- 2017 CEV Women's Challenge Cup, with Olympiacos Piraeus
- 2018 CEV Women's Challenge Cup, with Olympiacos Piraeus

==== National championships ====
- 2011/2012 Hellenic Championship, with Olympiacos Piraeus
- 2012/2013 Hellenic Championship, with Olympiacos Piraeus
- 2013/2014 Hellenic Championship, with Olympiacos Piraeus
- 2014/2015 Hellenic Championship, with Olympiacos Piraeus
- 2015/2016 Hellenic Championship, with Olympiacos Piraeus
- 2016/2017 Hellenic Championship, with Olympiacos Piraeus
- 2017/2018 Hellenic Championship, with Olympiacos Piraeus
- 2018/2019 Hellenic Championship, with Olympiacos Piraeus
- 2019/2020 Hellenic Championship, with Olympiacos Piraeus

==== National trophies ====
- 2011/2012 Hellenic Cup, with Olympiacos Piraeus
- 2012/2013 Hellenic Cup, with Olympiacos Piraeus
- 2013/2014 Hellenic Cup, with Olympiacos Piraeus
- 2014/2015 Hellenic Cup, with Olympiacos Piraeus
- 2015/2016 Hellenic Cup, with Olympiacos Piraeus
- 2016/2017 Hellenic Cup, with Olympiacos Piraeus
- 2017/2018 Hellenic Cup, with Olympiacos Piraeus
- 2018/2019 Hellenic Cup, with Olympiacos Piraeus

=== Individuals ===
- 2014 Hellenic Cup Final four: MVP
- 2015 European League: Best setter
- 2016-17 Hellenic Championship: MVP
- 2018 CEV Women's Challenge Cup: MVP
- 2019 Hellenic Cup Final four: MVP
- 2018-19 Hellenic Championship: MVP
