= Konstantina Vlachaki =

Greek volleyball player

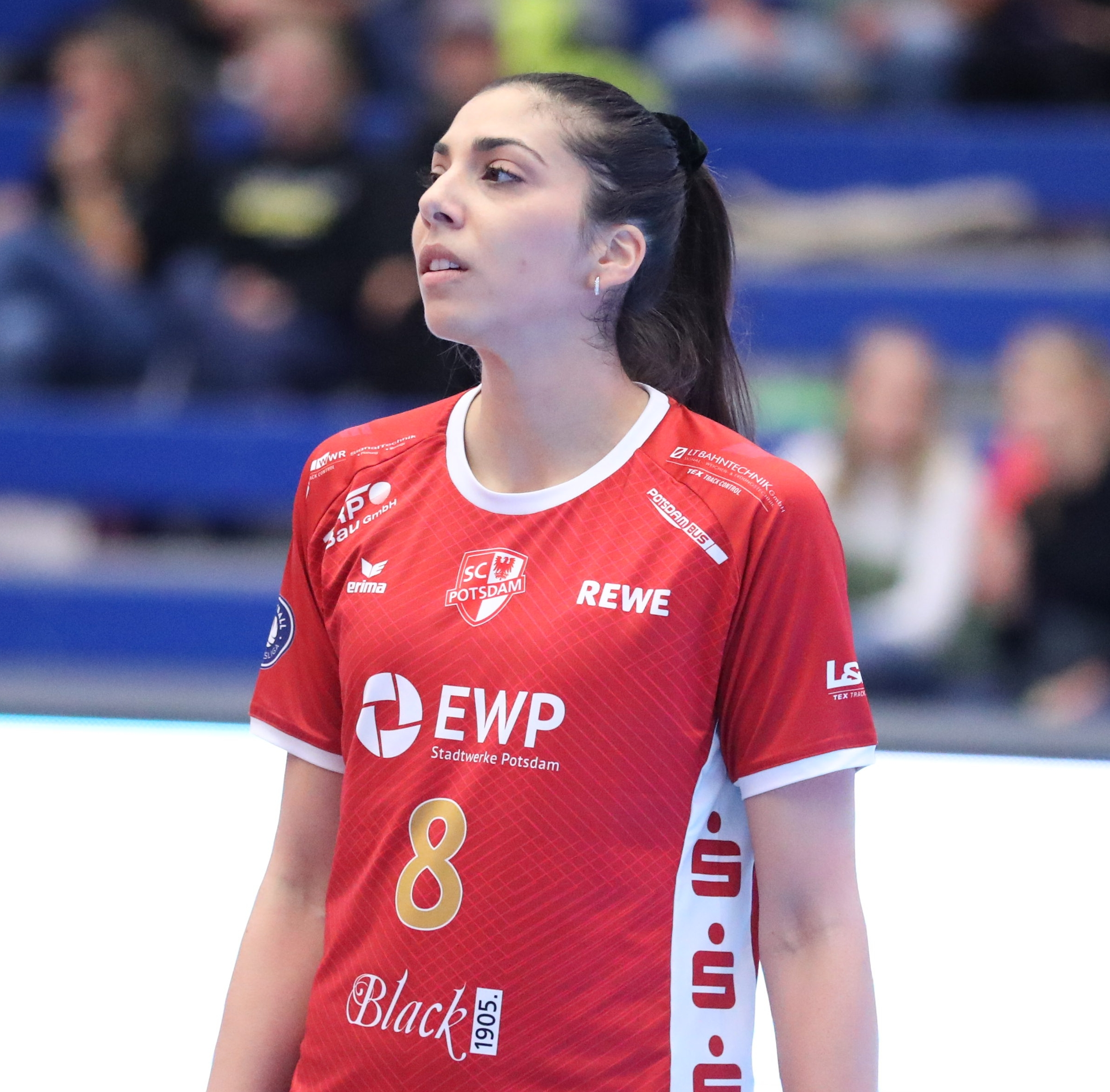
- Konstantina Vlachaki (2021)

Personal information
- Nationality: Greece
- Born: May 8, 1995 (age 31); Chania, Greece
- Height: 1.79 m (5 ft 10 in)
- Weight: 70 kg (150 lb)
- Spike: 265 cm (104 in)
- Block: 260 cm (100 in)

Volleyball information
- Position: Outside hitter
- Current club: (Greece) Panathinaikos
- Number: 8

Career
Years	Teams
2005–2013; 2013–2014; 2014–2019; 2019–2020; 2020–2021; 2021–2022; 2022–2023; 2023–2024; 2024–2025; 2025–	(Greece) SFP Chania (Greece) Iraklis Kifisia (Greece) Olympiacos Piraeus (Greece) Thetis Voula (Athens) (Greece) A.O. Thira (Germany) SC Potsdam (Greece) AEK Athens (Greece) Olympiacos Piraeus (Greece) Panathinaikos (Greece) Thetis Voula (Athens)

National team
(Greece) Hellas
- Last updated: 27 January 2025

Konstantina Vlachaki (Greek: Κωνσταντίνα Βλαχάκη; born May 8, 1995, in Chania, Greece) is a female professional volleyball player from Greece, who laste played in Hellenic Volley League for Panathinaikos. From 2014 to 2019 as a member of Olympiacos Piraeus she won 5 Hellenic Championships, 5 Hellenic Cups, and the CEV Women's Challenge Cup in 2018, being also runner-up of the CEV Women's Challenge Cup in 2017.

== Sporting achievements ==
=== Clubs ===
==== International competitions ====
- 2016/2017: CEV Women's Challenge Cup, with Olympiacos S.F. Piraeus
- 2017/2018: CEV Women's Challenge Cup, with Olympiacos S.F. Piraeus

=== National championships ===
- 2014/2015 Hellenic Championship, with Olympiacos Piraeus
- 2015/2016 Hellenic Championship, with Olympiacos Piraeus
- 2016/2017 Hellenic Championship, with Olympiacos Piraeus
- 2017/2018 Hellenic Championship, with Olympiacos Piraeus
- 2018/2019 Hellenic Championship, with Olympiacos Piraeus
- 2021/2022 German Championship, with SC Potsdam
- 2023/2024 Hellenic Championship, with Olympiacos Piraeus

=== National cups ===
- 2014/2015 Hellenic Cup, with Olympiacos Piraeus
- 2015/2016 Hellenic Cup, with Olympiacos Piraeus
- 2016/2017 Hellenic Cup, with Olympiacos Piraeus
- 2017/2018 Hellenic Cup, with Olympiacos Piraeus
- 2018/2019 Hellenic Cup, with Olympiacos Piraeus
- 2022/2023 Hellenic Cup, with AEK Athens
- 2023/2024 Hellenic Cup, with Olympiacos Piraeus
