= A2 Ethniki Women's Volleyball =

- Sport: Volleyball
- No. of teams: 24
- Country: Greece
- Continent: (European Union) Europe
- Most recent champion: AOF Porfyras
- Promotion to: A1 Ethniki Women's Volleyball
- Website: www.volleyball.gr

A2 Ethniki Women's Volleyball is the 2nd-tier of championship of women's volleyball in Greece. Since current year, the championship is held in four subgroups of teams. The winners of each subgroups take part in play off games. The winners of play off team take part in final four and three best teams promote to A1 Ethniki. In current season the winners are AOF Porfyras, Iraklis Kifissias and APS Corinthos. From 2017 to 2018 season established a second level in A2 category named as Women's Pre League.

== Winners ==
=== Recent winners ===
Two groups

Season	1st Group	2nd Group	Source
2008–09	Apollonios Keratsiniou	Anatolia College	
2009–10	AEK	SA Peiramatikou	

Three groups

Season	1st Group	2nd Group	3rd Group	Source
2010–11	Artemis Korydallou	FO Vrilissia	Makedones Axiou	
2011–12	Rethymno V.C.	Trachones V.C.	DAS Oraiokastrou	
2012–13	Pannaxiakos V.C.	ASP Iones	EO Stavroupolis	
2013–14	Thira V.C.	GS Ilioupolis	Anatolia College	
2014–15	Asteras Agiou Dimitriou	Filathlitikos Larissaikos	Aris	

Final Four system

Season	1st place	2nd place	3rd place	4th place	Source
2015–16	APS Thetis	AS Elpis	AS Makedones	Ilisiakos	
2016–17	AOF Porfyras	Iraklis Kifissias	APS Corinthos	XAN Thessaloniki	

Pre League system

Season	Preleague Winner	A2 Winner
2017–18	Ilisiakos	Protathlites Pefkon

== Current teams ==
=== Pre League ===
The clubs taking part in the 2017–18 league are:

Preleague
- APS Thetis
- AEK Athens
- X.A.N. Thessaloniki
- Ilisiakos
- GS Petroupolis
- AO Lamias
- FO Vrilissia
- Panionios V.C.
- Apollon Kalamarias
- ZAON
- GS Messaras
- AO Egaleo

=== A2 League ===
The clubs taking part in the 2017–18 league are:

1st Group	2nd Group	
1st Subgroup	1st Subgroup	2nd Subgroup
AON Amazones; AGS ArtemisThetis; Enosi Vyrona; AE Ilioupolis; AE Agias Paraskevis; AO Kydon; Messiniakos; AO Poseidon; OP Rethymnou	GSG Niki; AO Neas Byssas; A.O. Kavala; Archelaos Katerinis; GAS Megas Alexandros; AS Elpis; APS Navarchos Botsis; MAS Nea Genia	AS Giannena; AS Asclepios; EA Larissas; GS Nikaias; ASK Langada; EO Stavroupolis; P.A.O.K. V.C.
