= Eleni Memetzi =

Greek volleyball player (born 1975)

Personal information
- Nationality: Greek
- Born: 12 January 1975 (age 51)
- Height: 1.82 m (6 ft 0 in)
- Weight: 70 kg (150 lb)
- Spike: 293 cm (115 in)
- Block: 287 cm (113 in)

Volleyball information
- Position: Head coach
- Current club: AEK

Career
Years	Teams
1992–2005; 2005–2006; 2006–2007; 2007–2008; 2008–2010; 2011–2012	(Greece) FO Vrilissia (Greece) Markopoulo (Greece) Panellinios (Greece) Panionios (Greece) AEK (Greece) ZAON

National team
2004	Greece

Eleni Memetzi (born 12 January 1975) is a Greek female volleyball player. She was part of the Greece women's national volleyball team.

She competed with the national team at the 2004 Summer Olympics in Athens, Greece. She played with Vrilissia in 2004.

== Clubs ==
- (Greece) FO Vrilissia (2004)

== See also ==
- Greece at the 2004 Summer Olympics
