= Aias Evosmou =

Greek multi-sport club based in Evosmos

- Full name: Athletic Culture Association Aias Evosmou
- Founded: 1967
- Based in: Evosmos, Greece
- Arena: DAK Evosmou
- Colours: Red, White

Aias Evosmou is a Greek multi-sport club based in Evosmos, Thessaloniki. It was founded in 1967 and it has departments in various sports, football, basketball and volleyball. The full name of the club is Athlitikos Politistikos Syllogos Aias Evosmou/APS Aias Evosmou (Greek: Αθλητικός Πολιτιστικός Σύλλογος Αίας Ευόσμου/ΑΠΣ Αίας Ευόσμου meaning Athletic Culture Association Aias Evosmou). The most successful department is the women's volleyball team that plays in A1 Ethniki. The team's colours are red and white and its emblem is the ancient Greek hero Aias.

== History ==
Aias was founded in 1967 and it originally had only football team. Since 1979 the club opened a basketball team and since 1982 Aias opened the volleyball team. The basketball team achieved to reach to A2 Ethniki (2nd-tier). In the season 2014-15 Aias played in Greek B Basketball League (3rd-tier) but was relegated and now it plays in Greek C Basketball League (4th-tier). The volleyball team is the most successful. The men's team plays in A2 Ethniki and the women's team plays in A1 Ethniki, since it was promoted to A1 in 2014-15 season, because Anatolia College was withdrawn from the championship. The women's volleyball team was the finalist of Greek cup in 2004 when it was defeated by ZAON with score 3-2 sets.

== Departments ==
- Football
- Basketball (men's and women's)
- Volleyball (men's and women's)

== Honours ==
- Greek Women's Volleyball Cup
  - Finalist (1): 2004
