= Elitsa Vasileva =

Bulgarian volleyball player (born 1990)

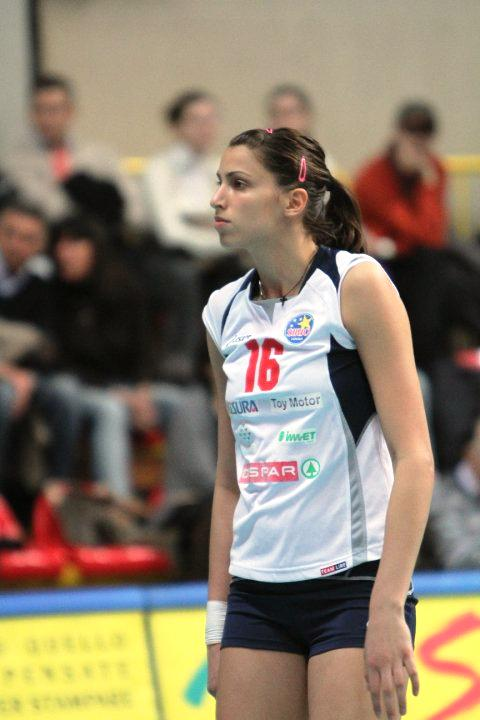

Personal information
- Full name: Elitsa Vasileva-Atanasijević
- Nationality: Bulgaria
- Born: May 13, 1990 (age 36) Dupnitsa, Bulgaria
- Height: 1.96 m (6 ft 5 in)
- Weight: 83 kg (183 lb)
- Spike: 310 cm (122 in)
- Block: 300 cm (118 in)

Volleyball information
- Position: Outside hitter
- Current club: (Greece) Panionios V.C.
- Number: 18 (club), 16 (national team)

National team
- Years: Team
- –: Bulgaria

Elitsa Vasileva-Atanasijević (born Elitsa Vasileva Bulgarian Cyrillic: Елица Василева; 13 May 1990 in Dupnitsa) is an international volleyball player from Bulgaria.

== Career ==
She has represented CSKA Sofia and also played in the Italian, Brazilian, South Korean, and Turkish top-level leagues. In December 2013, during her time in South Korea, Vasileva achieved 57 points in a single match, setting a world record.

=== National team ===
Vasileva has on many occasions served as captain of the team.

- 2012 Women's European Volleyball League - Runner-Up, with Bulgaria (she also won the best spiker and best scorer individual awards).
- 2013 Women's European Volleyball League - Third place, with Bulgaria
- 2021 Women's European Volleyball League, winning a gold medal.

== Clubs ==
- (Bulgaria) CSKA Sofia (2005–2007)
- (Italy) Esperia Cremona (2007–2009)
- (Italy) Sirio Perugia (2009–2010)
- (Italy) Zanetti Bergamo (2010–2012)
- (Brazil) Vôlei Amil/Campinas (2012–2013)
- (South Korea) Incheon Heungkuk Life Pink Spiders (2013–2014)
- (Turkey) Vakıfbank İstanbul (2014–2015)
- (Russia) Dinamo Kazan (2015–2018)
- (Italy) Pallavolo Scandicci (2018-2019)
- (Italy) Igor Gorgonzola Novara (2019-2020)
- (Italy) Pallavolo Scandicci (2020-2021)
- (Russia) Dinamo Moscow (2021–2022)
- (Turkey) Fenerbahçe S.K. (2024–2025)
- (Greece) Panionios V.C (2025–)

== Personal life ==
She is married to Serbian professional volleyball player Aleksandar Atanasijević who plays as an opposite spiker for Panionios.
