= AOF Porfyras =

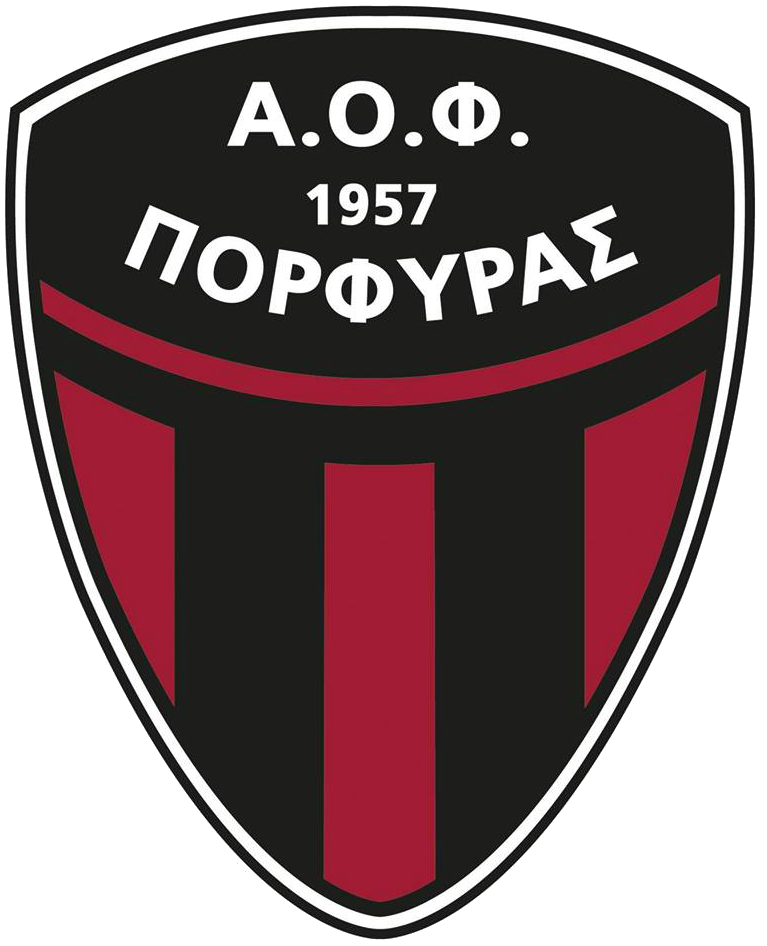
- Full name: Athletic Club of Freattyda Porfyras
- Founded: 1957
- Based in: Piraeus, Greece
- Colours: Red, Black

AOF Porfyras (full name: Athlitikos Omilos Freattydas Porfyras/ Greek: Αθλητικός Όμιλος Φρεαττύδας Πορφύρας) is a Greek multisport club based in Freattyda, Piraeus. It was founded in 1957 and has got sections in football, basketball and volleyball. The most successful team of the club is the volleyball women's team that plays in A1 Ethniki (1st tier).

== History ==
AOF Porfyras was founded in 1957 and it was named after the poet Lambros Porfyras who lived in Freattyda. Originally the club had teams in football and basketball. The basketball team was more successful and achieved to play in Beta Ethniki in period 1984-85 and 1985-86. In 1989-90, Porfyras won the championship of Gamma Ethniki and returned to Beta Ethniki for the period 1990-91. The basketball team achieved to play two even times in Gamma Ethniki, the seasons 2010-11 and 2011-12. In 1991, the volleyball team of Porfyras was founded and evolved in the most successful section of the club. In the season 2013-14 the women's volleyball team finished in the 3rd place of the A2 Ethniki. The next season finished in 2nd place and promoted to A1 Ethniki.

== Sections ==
- Football
- Basketball
- Volleyball
- Swimming
