= Maria Garagouni =

Greek volleyball player (born 1975)

Personal information
- Nationality: Greek
- Born: 21 December 1975 (age 50)
- Height: 1.81 m (5 ft 11 in)
- Weight: 79 kg (174 lb)
- Spike: 307 cm (121 in)
- Block: 290 cm (110 in)

Volleyball information
- Number: 2

Career
Years	Teams
1988-94	(Greece) EA Larissa
1994-2000	(Greece) Vrilissia
2001-2001	(Spain) Burgos VC
2001-2002	(Greece) ZAON
2002-2004	(Greece) Vrilissia
2004-2007	(Greece) Panathinaikos
2007-2010	(Greece) AO Markopoulo

National team
2004	Greece Greece

Maria Garagouni (born 21 December 1975) is a former Greek female volleyball player. She was part of the Greece women's national volleyball team.

She competed with the national team at the 2002 FIVB Volleyball Women's World Championship in Germany, and at the 2004 Summer Olympics in Athens, Greece. She played with Vrilissia in 2004. She won 3 Greek Championships and 2 Greek Cups with Panathinaikos.

== Clubs ==
- (Greece) Vrilissia (1994–2000)
- (Greece) Vrilissia (2002–2004)
- (Greece) Panathinaikos (2004–2007)

== See also ==
- Greece at the 2004 Summer Olympics
