= Filathlitikos =

Filathlitikos may refer to:

- Filathlitikos Thessaloniki, volleyball team, based in Thessaloniki
- Filathlitikos B.C., basketball team, based in Zografou, Athens
