= Yaasmeen Bedart-Ghani =

American volleyball player (born 1996)

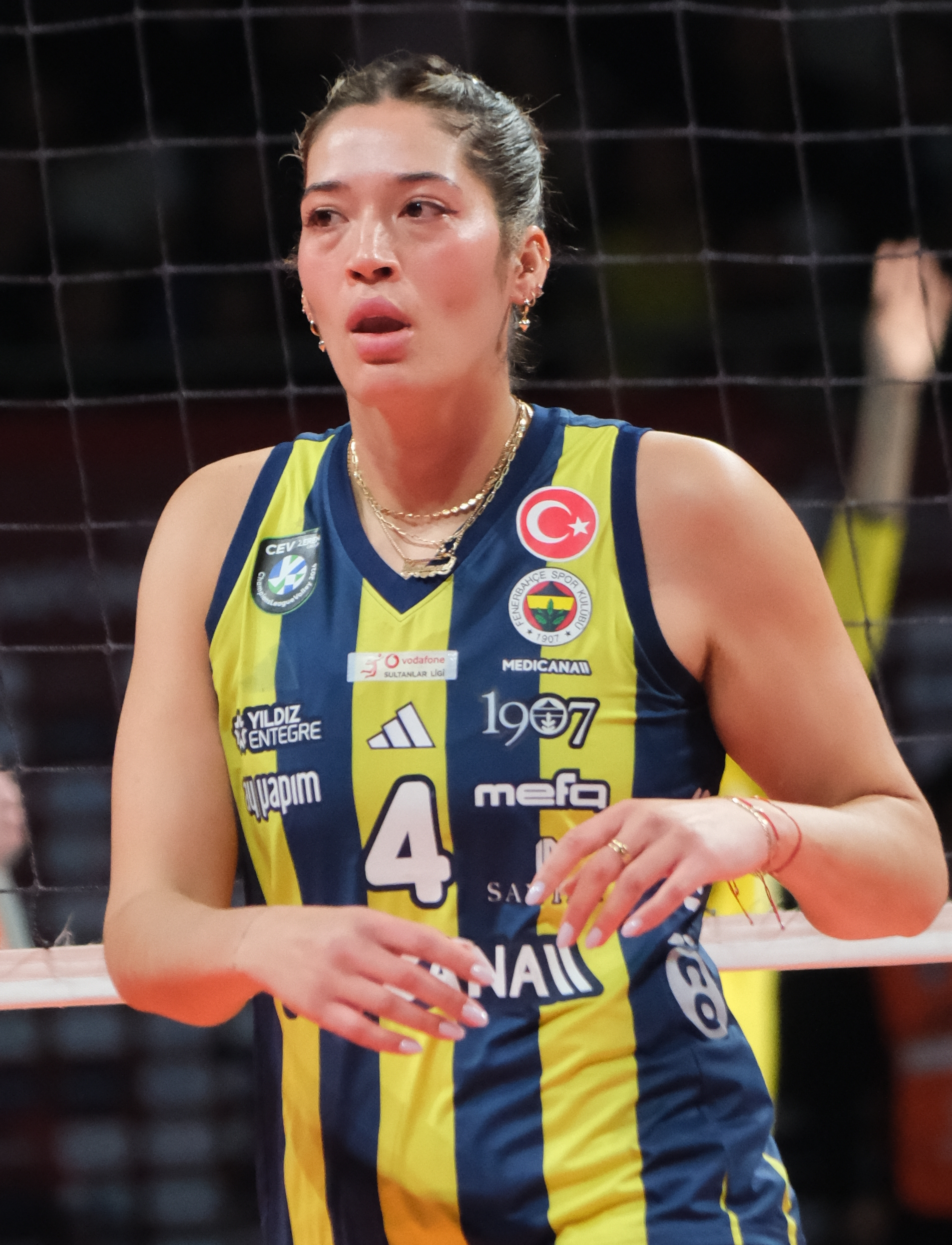

Personal information
- Full name: Yaasmeen Imani Bedart-Ghani
- Nickname: Yaazie
- Born: 8 November 1996 (age 29) Los Angeles, United States
- Height: 1.93 m (6 ft 4 in)
- Weight: 85 kg (187 lb)
- Spike: 330 cm (130 in)
- Block: 320 cm (126 in)

Volleyball information
- Position: Opposite
- Current club: (Turkey) Nilüfer Belediyespor

Career
- Years: Team
- 2018–2019 2019–2020 2019–2020 2020–2021 2021–2023 2023–2024 2024–2025 2025 2025–2026 2026-present: (Philippines) United Volleyball Club (Croatia) OK Poreč (Italy) Acqua & Sapone Roma Volley (Greece) AO Markopoulo (South Korea) Suwon Hyundai Hillstate (South Korea) Gwangju AI Peppers (Turkey) Keçiören Belediyesi SigortaShop (United States) San Diego Mojo (Turkey) Fenerbahçe (Turkey) Nilüfer Belediyespor

National team
- Years: Team
- –: United States

Yaasmeen Bedart-Ghani (born 8 November 1996) is an American volleyball player. She currently plays for Nilüfer Belediyespor as an opposite and is a member of USA women's national volleyball team.

== Early life ==
Bedart-Ghani was born on 8 November 1996 in Los Angeles, California to Adofo Ghani and Elizabeth Bedart-Ghani. Her father Adofo (California State University, Long Beach) and her two older brothers, Khaliq (Yale) and Khalil (University of San Diego) played basketball at university.

== Career ==
Bedart-Ghani attended Redondo Union High School, where she won the CIF State Championship and named the 2014-15 Gatorade California Volleyball Player of the Year,. After graduating, she played for the Texas Longhorns at University of Texas at Austin. There, she won three Big 12 Conference Championships in 2015, 2017, and 2018.

Bedart-Ghani currently plays as an opposite for Nilüfer Belediyespor. She previously played for United Volleyball Club, OK Poreč, Acqua & Sapone Roma Volley, AO Markopoulo, Suwon Hyundai Hillstate, Gwangju AI Peppers, Keçiören Belediyesi Sigorta Shop, San Diego Mojo, and Fenerbahçe.

== Awards ==
=== Individual ===
- 2021–22 Korean V-League's Best Server

=== Club ===
(United States) Texas Longhorns

- NCAA Division I: 2015–16, 2016–17
- Big 12 Conference: 2015–16, 2017–18, 2018–19 2016–17

(South Korea) Suwon Hyundai Hillstate

- V-League: 2022–23
- KOVO Cup: 2021–22 2022–23

(Turkey) Fenerbahçe

- Sultanlar Ligi: 2025-26
- Turkish Super Cup: 2025
