= EA Larissa =

Greek volleyball club

E.A. Larissa
- Founded: 1968
- Ground: Larissa
- League: Men's A2; Women's A2
- Website: Club home page

Uniforms
Home	Away

EA Larissa (Enosi Athlopaidion Larissa, Greek: Ένωση Αθλοπαιδιών Λάρισας) is a Greek volleyball club based in Larissa. It has men's and women's team that each have earlier presence in A1 Ethniki men's and women's. The men's team plays in A2 Ethniki Volleyball (2nd-tier) and the women's team plays also in A2 Ethniki (2nd-tier)

== History ==
EA Larissas was founded in 1968. Initially, it has only a men's team. The men's team played in A1 Ethniki for 8 seasons between 1969 and 1976. The next years the team played in lower divisions. The women's team was founded in 1986, and it is the most successful of the club. It has played in A1 Ethniki Women for over ten years. The last presence in A1 Ethniki was the season 2010-11 when it was relegated, having finished in the last place of the standings. The club plays in A2 Ethniki Women.
