= Ruxandra Dumitrescu =

Romanian volleyball player (1977–2024)

Personal information
- Nationality: Romanian / Greek
- Born: 20 April 1977; Galați, Romania
- Died: 3 March 2024 (aged 46); Sibiu, Romania
- Height: 186 cm (6 ft 1 in)

Volleyball information
- Number: 18 (national team) Shirt number nr.9-FOVrilissia and Panathinaikos (retired in her honour) National recordwoman in winning Volleyball Greek Cups (8 winning Greek Cups)

Career
| Years | Teams |
|---|---|
| 1994–1997; 1997–2003; 2003–2010; 2013–2014 | (Romania) Dacia Pitești (Greece) FO Vrilissia (Greece) Panathinaikos (Greece) Iraklis Kifisias |

National team
| 1994–1995; 2004–2009 | Romania; Greece |

Ruxandra 'Ruxi' Dumitrescu (20 April 1977 – 3 March 2024) was a Romanian volleyball player. Born in Galați, she competed with the Romania women's national volleyball team at the 1994 FIVB Volleyball Women's World Championship in Brazil. She was a naturalized Greek citizen, and competed with the Greece women's national volleyball team from Athens 2004 Olympic Games until 2009. She was 186 cm tall.

== Career ==
Dumitrescu played on club level with Dacia Pitești 1994–1997. In her career with Vrilissia Athens Team (1997–2003), she won one championship, three Greek cups, and a bronze medal in European Cup and with Panathinaikos women's volleyball team (2003–10), winning six championships, five cups, and reached the 2009 final of the CEV Women's Challenge Cup. Her shirt number (9) was retired by the club in her honour. She was voted Most Valuable Player of the Greek championship in 2009 and Most Valuable Player of the Greek Cup Final Four twice, in 2008 and 2009.

Dumitrescu was a devoted fan of Panathinaikos A.O. and in 2012 she was a candidate with the Panathinaikos Movement. She was married to Alexandros Nikolaidis and they had a son named Filip.

Dumitrescu died from a cardiac arrest in Sibiu, on 3 March 2024, at the age of 46.
