= Alexia Rotsidou =

Cypriot volleyball player and politician (born 1966)

Alexia Rotsidou (Greek: Αλεξία Ροτσίδου; born 12 April 1966) is a Cypriot volleyball coach, former international athlete, and politician.

She was born in Limassol and studied in Athens at the gymnastics academy. Since a child she dealt with sports and volleyball. She competed in a row at AEL Limassol, Panathinaikos, and finished her career in SA. Limassol. She started her coaching career at the Panathinaikos Juniors, while she has been sitting on the bench of many teams such as Trifyliakos of Athens, Apollon Limassol, Panidiakos Daliou. She has many participations in national Cyprus and has won championships and cups of Greece and Cyprus. She is a member of the Committee of the Cyprus Sports Organization "Sports and Women". She has won many awards, such as that of the best volleyball athlete in Cyprus for 1983.

In the 2001 parliamentary elections she was a candidate for Limassol with the Democratic Rally Movement.
