= Double (volleyball) =

A double occurs in volleyball when a player, during a match, is credited with scoring at least ten times in one (or more) of five statistical categories: aces, kills, blocks, digs, and assists. The term was apparently derived from similar basketball jargon; the expression "triple-double" was coined by former Los Angeles Lakers public relations director Bruce Jolesch in order to showcase Magic Johnson's versatility.

There are four main types of doubles:

- Double-double is the accumulation of a double-digit number total in two of the five categories.
- Triple-double is the accumulation of a double-digit number total in three of the five categories.
- Quadruple-double is the accumulation of a double-digit number total in four of the five categories.
- Quintuple-double is the accumulation of a double-digit number total in all five of the five categories.

Of the five statistical categories, double digit match totals are most common for assists, but rare for any positions other than setter. The next most frequent double-digit category is digs, which is most often attained by liberos or defensive specialists, but can be achieved by any strong defensive player. Kills are the third most common double-digit achievement category, occurring predominantly among hitters, especially outside hitters and middle blockers. Likewise, double-digit blocking numbers are preponderantly accomplished by middle blockers or outside hitters, but are much less common than double-digit kills. Rarest by far are double-digit aces, which even the most exceptional server is unlikely to attain once in a career.

== Double-double ==
Double-double is defined as an individual performance in which a player accumulates a double digit number total in two of five statistical categories, including aces, kills, blocks, digs, and assists, during one match. The most common double-double combination is digs and assists, frequently accomplished by setters, although sometimes achieved by liberos and defensive specialists. The next most frequent double-double is kills and digs, usually achieved by hitters (outside hitters or middle blockers) who are versatile defensively. Hitters (outside hitters, middle blockers, or opposite hitters) also sometimes accomplish a double-double of kills and blocks.

A double-double is regarded as an indication of superior all-around individual performance. Double-doubles are fairly common, and in some matches more than one player manages to record one, most likely when a match exceeds three sets, particularly five-set matches.

== Triple-double ==
Triple double is defined as an individual performance in which a player accumulates a double digit number total during one match in three of five statistical categories, aces, kills, blocks, digs, and assists. The most common way for a player to achieve a triple-double is with kills, blocks, and digs, usually attained by hitters (i.e., middle blockers, outside hitters, or opposite hitters) who are skilled defensively. Occasionally, setters record a triple-double, typically combining assists, digs, and either kills or blocks.

A triple-double is a rare event, and indicates outstanding all-around individual performance.

== Quadruple-double ==
Quadruple-double is defined as an individual performance in which a player accumulates a double digit number total in four of the five major statistical categories--aces, kills, blocks, digs, and assists--during the course of one match. Because of specialization by position (setters, liberos, middle blockers, outside hitters, opposite hitters, defensive specialists, etc.), quadruple doubles are seldom seen at collegiate or professional levels.

== Quintuple-double ==
Quintuple-double is defined as an individual performance in which a player accumulates a double digit number total in all five statistical categories (aces, kills, blocks, digs, and assists) in a single match. Such a feat has never occurred at the collegiate or the professional level.

== Notes ==
Like basketball, the recognition of double statistics in volleyball is a recent historical phenomenon.

Parity is not a characteristic of the statistical categories. The ace is undoubtedly most valuable, since it single-handedly earns a point for the team. The kill could be viewed as the next most valuable, because it consummates the winning of a point. Blocks have differing values, although the stuff block is comparable in value to the kill. The value of a dig also varies, depending primarily upon how effectively the ball is passed to a setter, but also on how difficult the save was to accomplish. Even more variable is the value of an assist, measured by such criteria as the strength of the received pass, accuracy, height, distance from the net, deceptiveness, and quickness.

Doubles are most likely to occur in a match that extends to five sets wherein one or more of the sets has extra points (i.e., scores in the first four sets exceeding 25 points, and a winning tally of more than 15 points in the fifth set).

== See also ==
- Volleyball jargon
