= Zanna Proniadou =

Greek volleyball player (born 1978)

Personal information
- Nationality: Greece
- Born: 13 December 1978 (age 47) Saratov, Soviet Union
- Height: 1.90 m (6 ft 3 in)
- Weight: 82 kg (181 lb)
- Spike: 305 cm (120 in)
- Block: 300 cm (120 in)

Volleyball information
- Position: middle blocker
- Current club: Filathlitikos Thessaloniki
- Number: 1 (national team)

National team
- Years: Team
- 2002-2004: Greece

Zanna Proniadou (born 13 December 1978) is a Greek volleyball player. She was part of the Greece women's national volleyball team.

She competed with the Greek national team at the 2004 Summer Olympics in Athens, Greece. On club level she played with Filathlitikos Thessaloniki in 2002 and with Filathlitikos in 2004.

== Clubs ==
- Filathlitikos Thessaloniki (2002)
- (Greece) Filathlitikos (2004)
