= Niki Garagouni =

Greek volleyball player (born 1977)

Personal information
- Nationality: Greek
- Born: 12 March 1977 (age 49)
- Height: 1.85 m (6 ft 1 in)
- Weight: 84 kg (185 lb)
- Spike: 313 cm (123 in)
- Block: 255 cm (100 in)

Volleyball information
- Number: 4

Career
Years	Teams
1988-1994	(Greece) EA Larissa
1994-2000	(Greece) Vrilissia VC
2000-2007	(Greece) Panathinaikos
2007-2010	(Greece) AO Markopoulo

National team
2004	Greece Greece

Niki Garagouni (born 12 March 1977) is a former Greek female volleyball player. She was part of the Greece women's national volleyball team.

She competed with the national team at the 2002 FIVB Volleyball Women's World Championship in Germany, and at the 2004 Summer Olympics in Athens, Greece. She played for Panathinaikos between 2000 and 2007.

== Clubs ==
- (Greece) Panathinaikos (2000–2007)

== See also ==
- Greece at the 2004 Summer Olympics
