= Kristina Guncheva =

Bulgarian volleyball player (born 1994)

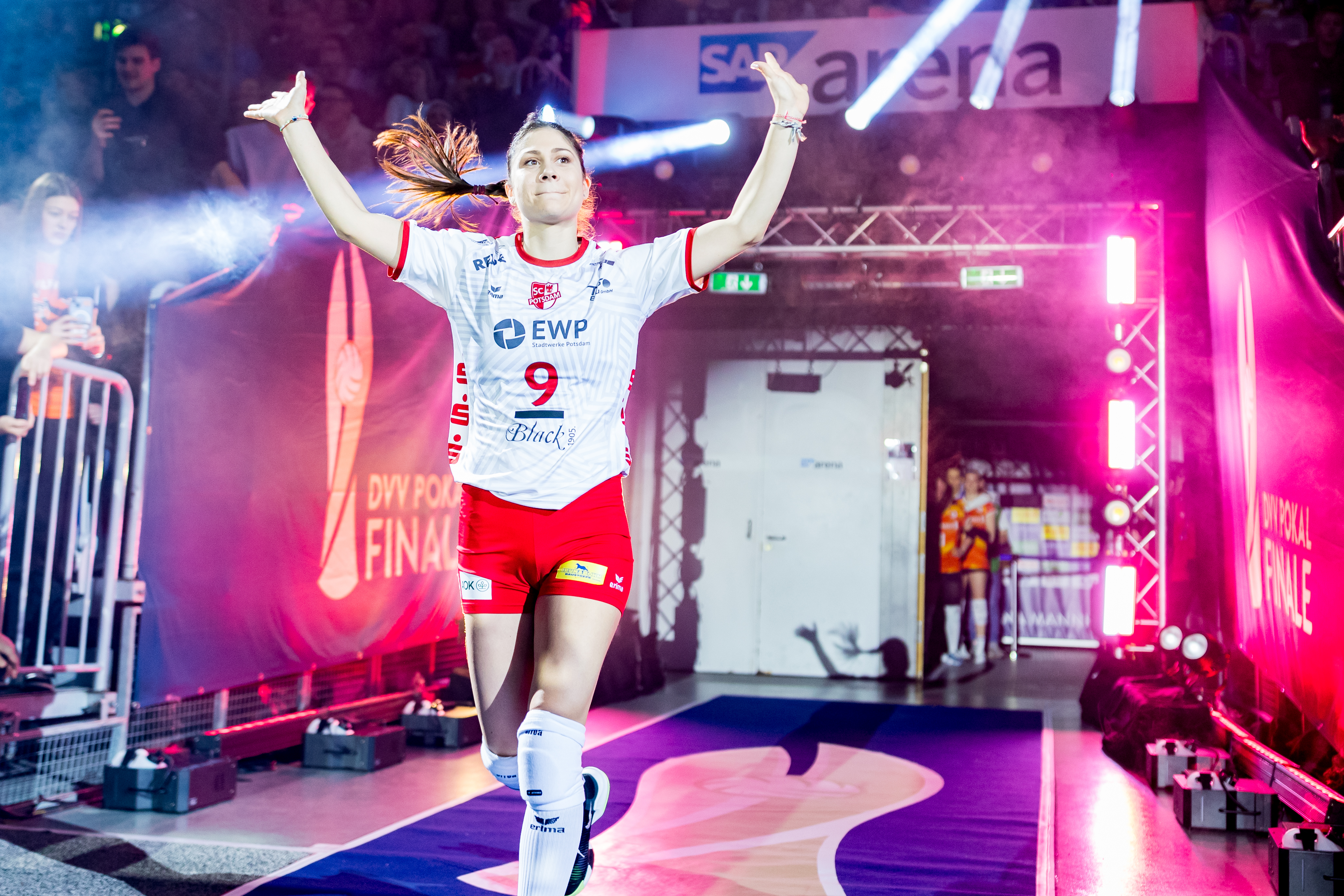

Personal information
- Nationality: Bulgaria
- Born: 24 March 1994 (age 32)
- Height: 1.79 m (5 ft 10 in)
- Weight: 61 kg (134 lb)
- Spike: 300 cm (120 in)
- Block: 297 cm (117 in)

Career
Teams
| | Bulgaria Levski Sofia |

Kristina Guncheva (Bulgarian: Кристина Гунчева) (born 24 March 1994) is a Bulgarian female volleyball player. She plays as a setter for the Bulgaria women's national volleyball team and Romania .She was part of the Bulgarian national team at the 2015 FIVB Volleyball Women's U23 World Championship, 2015 FIVB World Grand Prix, and 2017 FIVB World Grand Prix.

She competed at the 2018 Women's European Volleyball Championship preliminaries.

== Clubs ==
- 🇭🇺 Tf Aluprof (Hungary) 2014
- 🇹🇷 Bursa (Turkey) 2015
- (Switzerland) Volley Köniz (2016)
- (Bulgaria) Levski Sofia (2018)
- 🇹🇩 Sciinta Bacau (Romania) 2019-2021
- 🇷🇴Dinamo Bucuresti 2022
- 🇫🇷Chamalieres 2023
- 🇩🇪Potsdam 2024
- Panionios (Greece) 2025
- 🇷🇴 Voluntaru 2026
