= Matea Ikić =

Croatian volleyball player (born 1989)

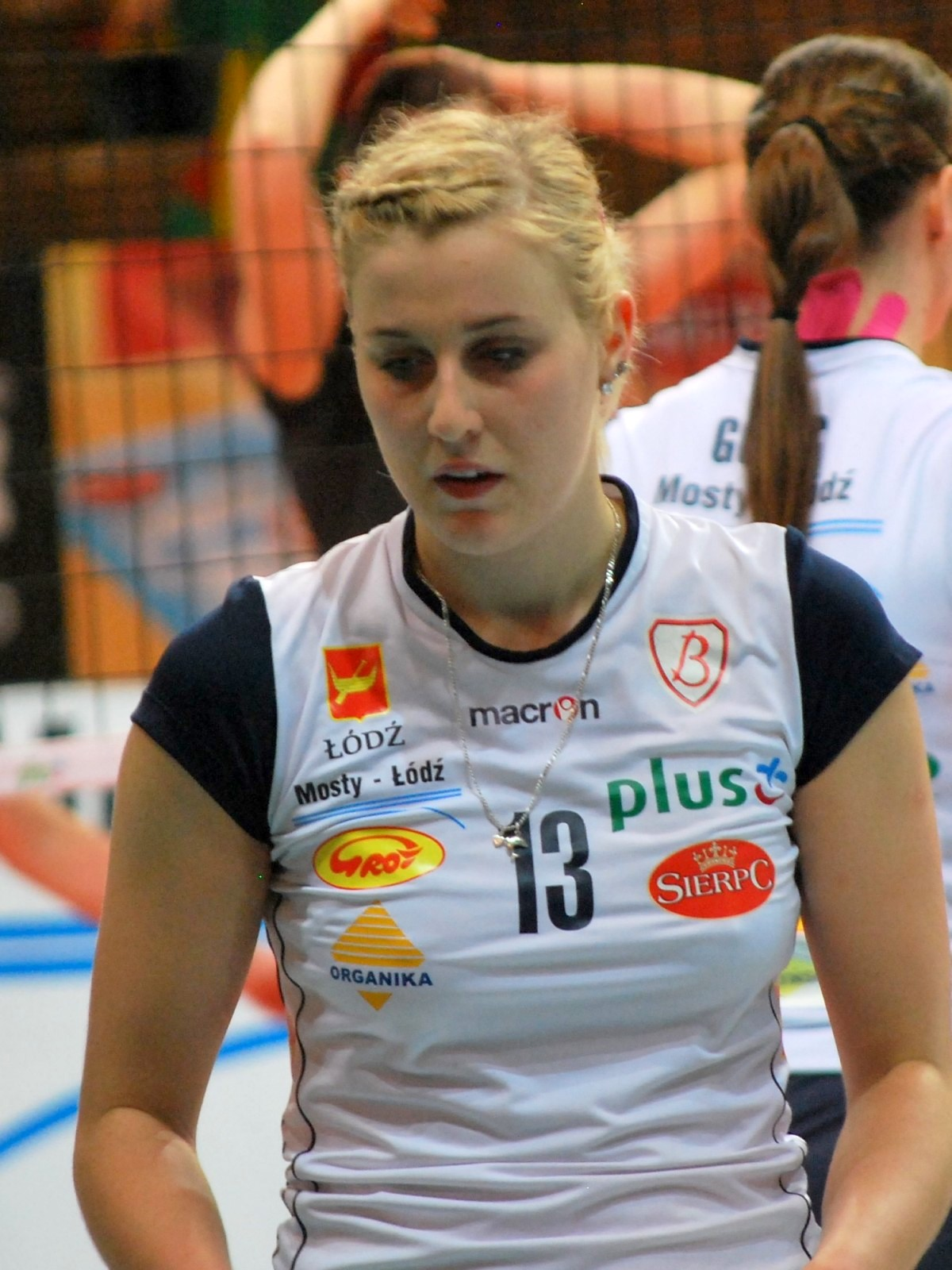

Personal information
- Born: 25 May 1989 (age 37); Pula, SFR Yugoslavia
- Height: 1.87 m (6 ft 2 in)
- Weight: 77 kg (170 lb)
- Spike: 300 cm (120 in)
- Block: 275 cm (108 in)

Volleyball information
- Position: Outside hitter
- Current club: Panionios V.C.

Career
Years	Teams
2002–2006; 2006–2009; 2009–2010; 2010–2011; 2011–2012; 2012–2013; 2013–2014; 2014–2015; 2015–2016; 2016; 2016–2017; 2017–2018; 2018–2019; 2019–2021; 2021–2022; 2022–2023; 2023–2024; 2024–	OK Pula; Vicenza Volley; Riso Scotti Pavia; MKS Dąbrowa Górnicza; Budowlani Łódź; IFH Volley Frosinone; Pallavolo Ornavasso; LJ Volley; Neruda Volley; Pallavolo Scandicci; CSM Târgoviște; Volero Le Cannet; Altay VC; Kuzeyboru; Karayolları Spor Kulübü; Adam Voleybol; CSM București; Panionios V.C.

National team
Croatia
Honours
Women's volleyball
Representing Croatia
European League
Silver medal – second place	2021 Ruse

Matea Ikić (born 25 May 1989) is a Croatian volleyball player. She plays as outside hitter for Greek club Panionios V.C.

== International career ==
She is a member of the Croatia women's national volleyball team. She competed at the 2018 FIVB Volleyball Women's Club World Championship, and 2021 Women's European Volleyball League, winning a silver medal.
