= Aris Thessaloniki women's volleyball =

Greek volleyball club

Aris Thessaloniki Women's Volleyball
- Ground: Anestis Petalidis Indoor Hall; Thessaloniki, Greece (Capacity: 250)
- Manager: Giannis Tsairelis
- League: A1 Ethniki

Uniforms
Home	Away

Aris Thessaloniki Women's Volleyball is the women's volleyball department of Aris Thessaloniki, the Greek multisport club based in Thessaloniki. The club plays in the A1 Ethniki Women's Volleyball. In the 2015-2016 season. it finished in 4th place in the top flight of women's volleyball in Greece.

== History ==
The women's team of Aris was founded in 1926. After some years the team ceased its activities. The club became again active since 1971. For a lot of years the club plays in A1 Ethniki. The presence of Aris in A1 Ethniki was interrupted for five years, between 1989 and 1993. The next period, the club returned in A1 Ethniki and plays continuously until 2009, when it was relegated again. The next return in A1 Ethniki was in current season. In 2014-15, Aris finished in 1st place of its group and promoted to A1.

=== Notable players ===
- (Kenya) Sharon Chepchumba

=== Recent seasons ===
Season	Division	Place	Notes
2009-10	A1 Ethniki	11th	Relegated to A2
2010-11	A2 Ethniki	2nd	
2011-12	A2 Ethniki	3rd	
2012-13	A2 Ethniki	8th	
2013-14	A2 Ethniki	2nd	
2014-15	A2 Ethniki	1st	Promoted to A1
2015-16	A1 Ethniki	5th	

== Honours ==
=== Domestic ===
Greek Women’s Volleyball League:

- Runners-up : 2017-18

== Current women's volleyball squad ==
As of October 5, 2016

Number	Player	Position	Height (m)	Date of birth
1	(Serbia) Brankica Nikić	Opposite	1.92	26/10/1985
2	(Greece) Anastasia Gougousi	Outside Hitter	1.84	23/5/1998
3	(Greece) Maria Chitziou	Libero	1.70	3/10/1997
4	(Brazil) Juliana Caetano	Outside Hitter	1.80	11/6/1987
5	(Greece) Eufrosini Alexakou	Outside Hitter	1.80	26/2/2000
6	(Greece) Irini Kelesidou	Libero	1.75	16/5/1991
9	(Brazil) Viviane Pessoa	Opposite	1.84	8/6/1991
10	(Greece) Lamprianna Pitta	Middle Blocker	1.84	30/1/1998
11	(Greece) Mariantzela Charavelouli	Setter	1.85	7/6/1996
12	(Greece) Chrisanthi Stamatiou	Outside Hitter	1.81	14/6/1999
13	(Greece) Nikoleta Karafoulidou	Middle Blocker	1.86	26/1/1993
14	(Greece) Elena Konstantinidou	Middle Blocker	1.81	8/4/1992

=== Technical staff ===
Staff
Coach	(Greece) Dimitris Solkidis
Statistician	(Greece) Anna Panagiotou
Athletic Trainer	(Greece) Nikos Gkiosis
Doctor	(Greece) Ioannis Terzidis
Physiotherapist	(Greece) Konstantinos Pepelas
