= Jana Šimánková =

Czech volleyball player (born 1980)

Personal information
- Nationality: Czech
- Born: 6 April 1980 (age 46); Brno, Czechoslovakia
- Height: 1.79 m (5 ft 10 in)

Volleyball information
- Position: setter

National team
Czech Republic

Jana Šimánková (born 6 April 1980) is a retired Czech female volleyball player, who played as a setter. She was part of the Czech Republic women's national volleyball team at the 2002 FIVB Volleyball Women's World Championship in Germany.

== Clubs ==
- Panathinaikos women's volleyball
- Olympiacos women's volleyball
- Královo Pole Brno
