= Freattyda =

Neighborhood of Piraeus, Greece

Coordinates: 37.934°N 23.645°E

Freattyda (Greek: Φρεαττύδα) is the name of a residential area in Piraeus, Athens, Greece. It is situated in the southeastern part of the Piraeus, near the Zea harbour. The Hellenic Maritime Museum is situated in Freattyda.
