= Panellinios V.C. =

Greek volleyball club

Panellinios Volley
- Full name: Panellinios Gymnastikos Syllogos
- Ground: Panellinios Indoor Hall, Kypseli, Athens (Capacity: 1,100 (permanent tier seats); 1,800 (with temporary tier seats))
- League: A2
- 2014-15: 6th

Uniforms
Home	Away

Championships
- 6

Panellinios V.C. is the men's volleyball section of Panellinios G.S., the Greek multi-sports club, that is based in Athens. It was one of the first volleyball clubs in Greece, and is also one of the most successful, since it has won six Greek Championships. Panellinios also has a women's team that has won two Greek Women's Championships, and one Greek Women's Cup.

== History ==
Panellinios was one of the first volleyball clubs in Greece. The former sports trainer of Panellinios, Anastasios Lefkaditis, is considered to be the man who is mainly responsible for importing the sport of volleyball to Greece. Panellinios took part in the first unofficial Greek men's volleyball championship, along with Panionios and Ethnikos Athens. It was the first winner of the official Greek volleyball championship in 1936. It won 6 overall Greek championships, through the year 1961. In recent years, the team has played in the A2 Ethniki (2nd-tier level).

=== Recent seasons ===
Season	Division	Place	Notes
2009–10	A1 Ethniki	5th	
2010–11	A1 Ethniki	12th	Relegation to A2
2011–12	A2 Ethniki	3rd	
2012–13	A2 Ethniki	4th	
2013–14	A2 Ethniki	8th	
2014–15	A2 Ethniki	5th	
2015–16	A2 Ethniki	10th	Relegation to Beta

=== Honours ===
- Greek Championship
  - Winner (5): 1936, 1937, 1939, 1940, 1961

== Women's team ==
Panellinios also has a volleyball team that dominated in Greek women's volleyball, during the 2000-2002 period. The team won two Greek Women's Championships (2001, 2002), and one Greek Women's Cup (2001). In 2012, the team withdrew from the women's championship, due to financial problems, and nowadays, it plays in the lower local divisions.

=== Honours ===
- Greek Championship
  - Winner (2): 2001, 2002
- Greek Cup
  - Winner (1): 2001
