= Triple-double (volleyball) =

Triple-double is defined as an individual performance in which a player accumulates a double digit number total during one match in three of five statistical categories: Aces, kills, blocks, digs, and assists. The expression probably came from similar basketball jargon; the term "triple-double" was coined by former Los Angeles Lakers public relations director Bruce Jolesch in order to showcase Magic Johnson's versatility.

The most common way for a player to achieve a triple-double is with kills, blocks, and digs, usually attained by hitters (i.e., middle blockers or outside hitters) who are skilled defensively. Occasionally, setters record a triple-double, typically combining assists, digs, and either kills or blocks.

A triple-double is a rare event, and indicates outstanding all-around individual performance.

== See also ==
- Volleyball
- Volleyball jargon
