= Evosmos =

Suburb of the Thessaloniki Urban Area, Greece

Evosmos Εύοσμος
- Municipal unit
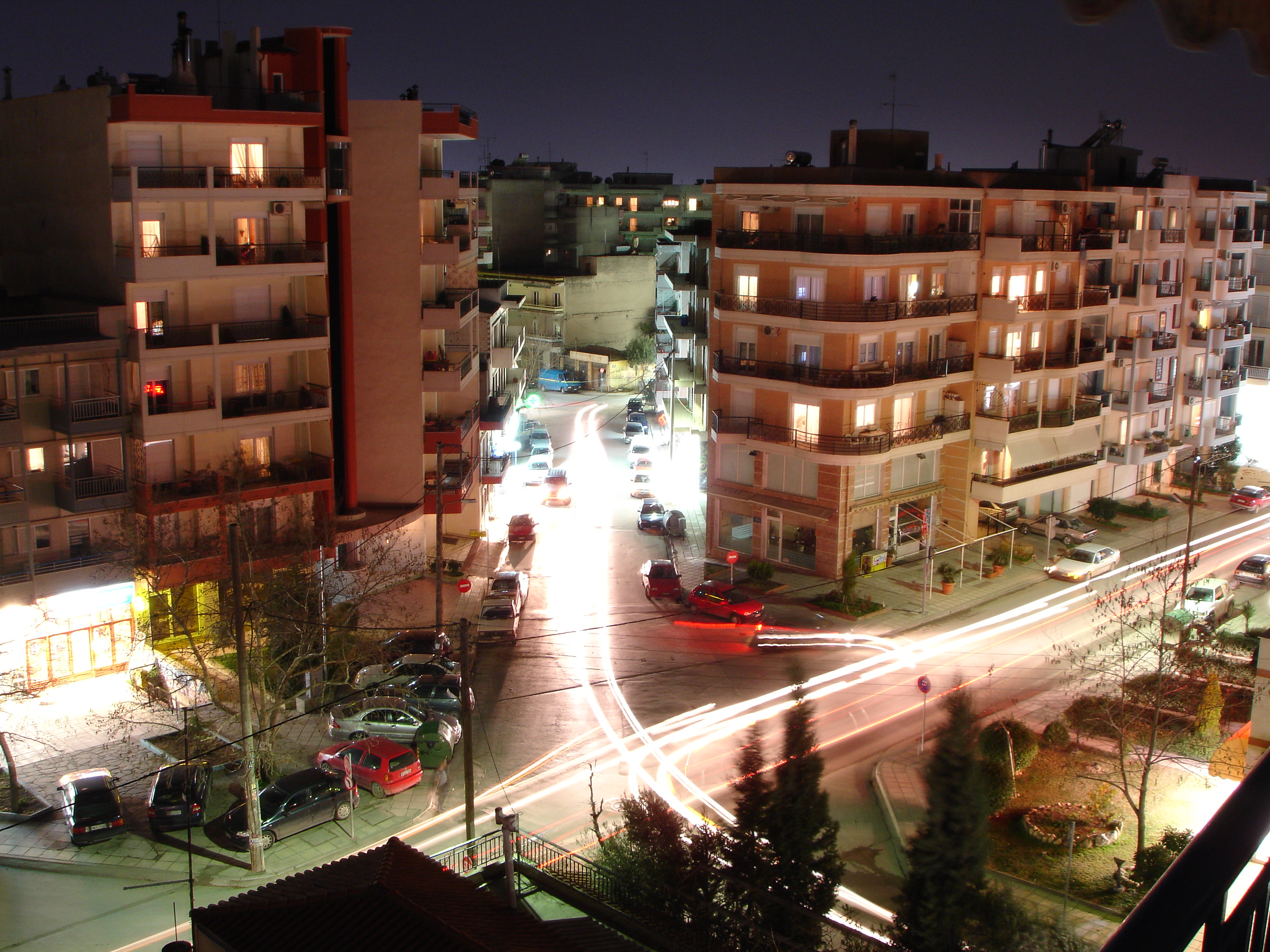
- Street of the suburb

- Location within the regional unit

- Location within Greece
- Coordinates: 40°40′8″N 22°54′30″E
- Country: Greece
- Administrative region: Central Macedonia
- Regional unit: Thessaloniki
- Municipality: Kordelio-Evosmos

Area
  - Municipal unit: 9.927 km^{2} (3.833 sq mi)
- Elevation: 35 m (115 ft)

Population (2021)
  - Municipal unit: 79,221
  - Municipal unit density: 7,980/km^{2} (20,670/sq mi)
- Time zone: UTC+2 (EET)
  - Summer (DST): UTC+3 (EEST)
- Area code: +30-231
- Vehicle registration: Ν
- Website: www.kordelio-evosmos.gr

Evosmos (Greek: Εύοσμος, Évosmos; before 1955: Neos Koukloutzas (Νέος Κουκλουτζάς, Néos Koukloutzás)) is a suburb of the Thessaloniki Urban Area and was a former municipality in the regional unit of Thessaloniki, Macedonia, Greece. Since the 2011 local government reform it is part of the municipality Kordelio-Evosmos, of which it is the seat and a municipal unit. It has a land area of 9.927 square kilometres (3.833 sq mi) and its population is 79,221 (2021 census). Due to rapid development, the population has been growing fast. Most of the new development is taking place in the northern district of the municipality called Nea Politeia (New Town).

== History ==
Evosmos' first dramatic increase in population occurred when refugees from Asia Minor settled in the area in the early 20th century. The settlement was originally a small village called in Turkish Harmanköy (Χαρμάνκιοϊ). At the population exchange between Greece and Turkey in 1923, the Muslim Inhabitants (Turks, Pomaks, Muslim Romani people) went to Turkey. In 1953, Harmanköy became an independent community and was renamed Neos Koukloutzas (Νέος Κουκλουτζάς). Two years later it was renamed again to Evosmos, meaning a place that smells nice.

== Cultural activity ==
Most cultural activity takes place around the municipality's main square. The square is surrounded by cafes, bars, the city hall, and the main church of the municipality.

The main shopping street, Megalou Alexandrou, is just to the north of the square. The cultural center and cinema are located on this street.

== Religion ==
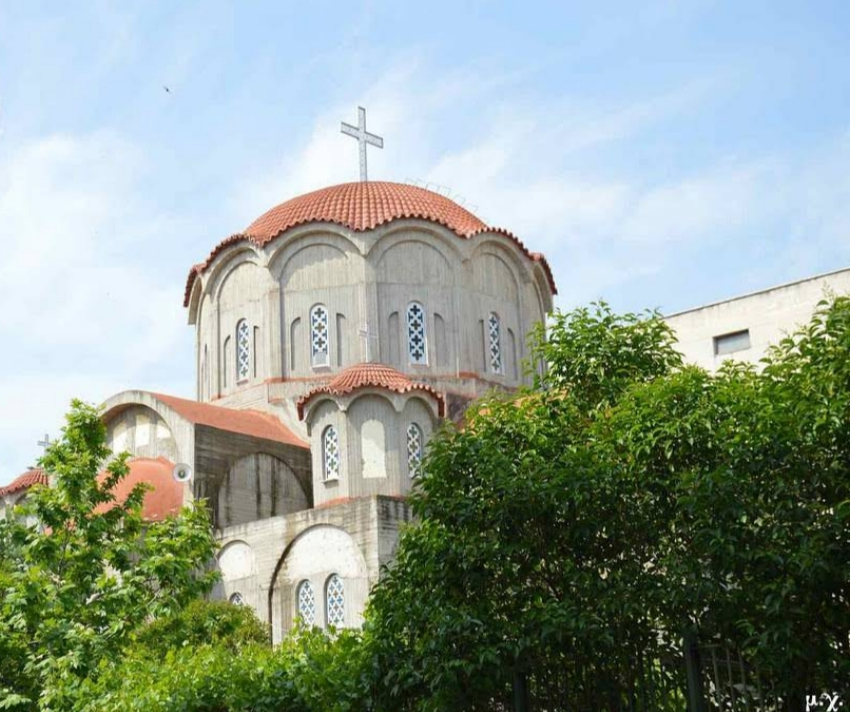
Saint Fotini church

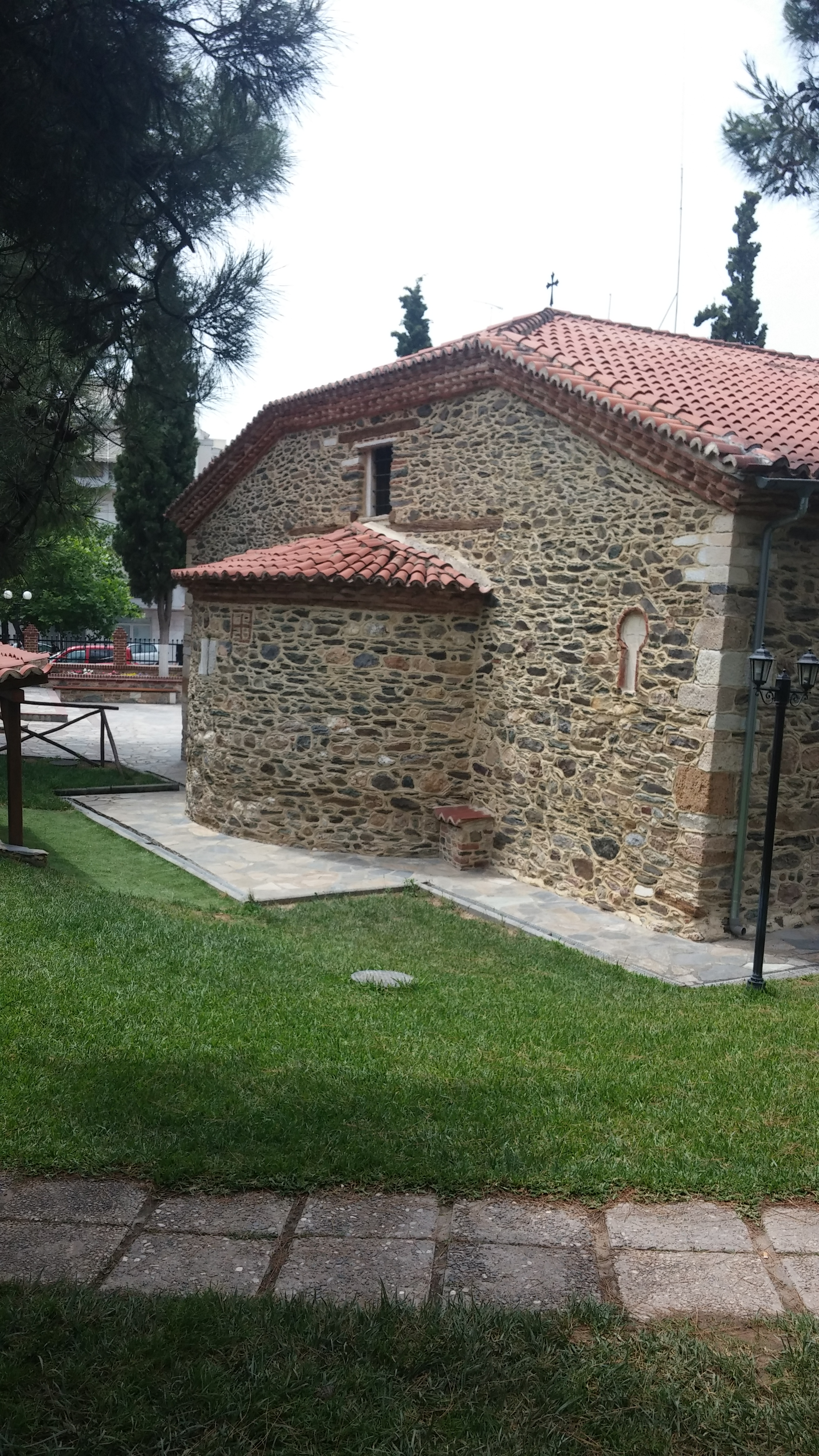
St Athanasius of Evosmos (1818)

There are several orthodox churches in the municipality. Agios Athanasios was built in 1818 and is the oldest of the three. Evagelismos is the largest and is located by the square. The Church of the Three Hierarchs is the newest church and is located in the Nea Politeia district.

== Sports ==
The Municipal Athletic Center of Evosmos (in Greek Δημοτικό Αθλητικό Κέντρο Ευόσμου) is located in Nea Politeia. It has indoor basketball and volleyball courts. The Center is used as temporary home by Iraklis Volley for their matches in CEV Champions League. It has also hosted the 2003 Juniors' World Basketball Championship's first round.

Agrotikos Asteras is the local football club that plays professionally in the B' Division - Super League 2. Other smaller clubs include Aias Evosmou, A. E. Evosmou, Ethnikos Evosmou and Makedon Evosmou, all of which play in the amateur leagues.

Several notable athletes have come out of Evosmos. Some of the better-known figures include Dinos Kouis and Georgios Firos who both started their careers at Agrotikos Asteras and went on to play for Aris Thessaloniki as well as the national team. Nikos Hatzivrettas is a notable basketball player who began his career at Aias Evosmou.

Notable sport clubs based in Evosmos
Club	Founded	Sports	Achievements
Agrotikos Asteras	1932	Football	Earlier presence in Beta Ethniki, current presence in Super League 2
Aias Evosmou	1969	Basketball, Volleyball	Earlier presence in A2 Ethniki men's basketball, Presence in A1 Ethniki women's volleyball

== People ==
- Dinos Kouis, footballer
- Kyriakos Velopoulos, journalist, politician
- Alexandros Samodurov, basketball player
