= Georgia Tzanakaki =

Greek volleyball player (born 1980)

Personal information
- Nationality: Greek
- Born: 1 December 1980 (age 45)
- Height: 1.89 m (6 ft 2 in)
- Weight: 85 kg (187 lb)
- Spike: 278 cm (109 in)
- Block: 267 cm (105 in)

Volleyball information
- Position: middle blocker
- Number: 15

Career
Years	Teams
1998-2004	(Greece) Panellinios
2004-2005	(France) Mulhouse
2005-2007	(Greece) Panellinios
2007-2011	(Greece) Panathinaikos
2011-2013	(Greece) AEK

National team
2004–2011	Greece Greece

Georgia Tzanakaki (born 1 December 1980) is a retired Greek female volleyball player. She was part of the Greece women's national volleyball team.

She competed with the national team at the 2004 Summer Olympics in Athens, Greece. She won the silver medal at the 2005 Mediterranean Games. She also competed at the 2009 Mediterranean Games. On club level she played with Panellinios in 2004 and for Panathinaikos.

== Clubs ==
- (Greece) Panellinios (1998–2004)
- (France) Mulhouse (2004–2005)
- (Greece) Panellinios (2005–2007)
- (Greece) Panathinaikos (2007–2011)
- (Greece) AEK (2011–13)

== See also ==
- Greece at the 2004 Summer Olympics
