= Anorthosis Famagusta Volleyball (women) =

Volleyball team based in Nicosia, Cyprus

Anorthosis Famagusta Volleyball is the women's volleyball team of Cypriot sports club Anorthosis Famagusta. The team is temporarily based in Nicosia due to the Turkish invasion of Cyprus in 1974.

== Short history ==
The women's volleyball team of Anorthosis was established in the club's home town of Famagusta and was the first women's volleyball team on the island. After the Turkish invasion of Cyprus in 1974, Famagusta's residents were forced to leave the city and move elsewhere in Cyprus. The women's volleyball team stayed for a short term in Larnaca, but was re-established in 1987 in Nicosia, by Anorthosis' people who moved there after the war. The first members of the team were schoolgirls, but gradually the team grew and became competitive in the first division of women's volleyball. Their first championship came in 2002, and in 2004 Anorthosis managed to win both the championship and National Cup. Since then, Anorthosis has been one of the top four teams of the Cypriot championship, and has won seven championships, seven National Cups and nine Super Cups. That makes Anorthosis the most successful Cypriot women's team of the last 20 years.

== Current volleyball squad ==
Number	Player	Nationality	Position	Birth Year	Height (m)
1	Stella Ioannou	Cyprus	Setter	1995	1.76
2	Erika Zembyla	Cyprus	Opposite	1996	1.81
3	Andrea Charalambous	Cyprus	Middle blocker	1988	1.83
4	Christiana David	Cyprus	Libero	1993	1.66
5	Desislava Nikolova	Bulgaria	Outside hitter	1991	1.80
6	Tatiana Antoniou	Cyprus	Libero	2004	1.65
7	Kalia Vassiliou (C)	Cyprus	Setter	1987	1.80
8	Pelagia Tzakidou	Cyprus	Middle blocker	2003	1.78
11	Vaso Riala	Cyprus	Middle blocker	2000	1.88
14	Constantina Orfanidi	Cyprus	Setter	2004	1.70
15	Elena Tsoutsouki	Cyprus	Setter	2004	1.75
17	Christina Theodotou	Cyprus	Outside hitter	2004	1.75
18	Svitlana Shvanska	Ukraine	Outside hitter	1990	1.80

Coach: Dragan Djordjevic Serbia
Ass. Coach: Yiannis Petroudis Greece
President of Department: Adamos Montanios

== Titles ==
- Cyprus Championships: 7
  - 2002, 2004, 2006, 2010, 2013, 2018, 2019
- Cyprus Cups: 7
  - 2004, 2008, 2009, 2010, 2012, 2013, 2019
- Cyprus Super Cups: 9
  - 1993, 1994, 2002, 2004, 2010, 2012, 2017, 2018, 2019
- Championship Runner-up: 12
  - 1993, 1994, 1995, 1996, 1997, 1998, 2000, 2005, 2008, 2009, 2011, 2014
- Cup Finalist: 7
  - 1993, 1994, 1996, 1999, 2002, 2005, 2017, 2018
