= Greek Women's Volleyball Cup =

- Sport: Volleyball
- Founded: 1998
- Founder: Hellenic Volleyball Federation
- Country: Greece
- Most titles: Olympiacos Piraeus (11)
- Domestic cup: Hellenic Super Cup
- Website: www.volleyball.gr

The Greek women's Volleyball Cup began in the 1998–99 season and is organized by Hellenic Volleyball Federation (ΕΟΠΕ). So far, seven clubs have won the cup. Olympiacos is the most successful club in the competition with 10titles. Olympiacos are the current cup holders.

== Finals ==
Season	Winner	Score	Finalist	The sets	Place
1998−99	Filathlitikos Vrilissia	3–0	Panathinaikos	26–24, 25–18, 25–14	Alexandroupoli
1999–00	Filathlitikos Vrilissia	3–1	Filathlitikos Thessaloniki	25–18, 25–19, 13–25, 25–22	Pylaia, Thessaloniki
2000–01	Panellinios	3–2	Filathlitikos Vrilissia	21–25, 25–20, 25–19, 18–25, 15–10	Larissa
2001–02	ZAON Kifissia	3–2	Aias Evosmos	25–21, 25–18, 17–25, 18–25, 15–13	Evosmos, Thessaloniki
2002–03	Filathlitikos Vrilissia	3–0	Panellinios	27–25, 25–17, 25–23	Vrilissia, Athens
2003–04	Filathlitikos Vrilissia	3–1	Panellinios	26–24, 22–25, 25–16, 25–22	Piraeus
2004–05	Panathinaikos	3–1	Filathlitikos Vrilissia	25–22, 21–25, 25–11, 25–14	Keratsini, Piraeus
2005–06	Panathinaikos	3–1	Panellinios	25–14, 25–14, 16–25, 25–13	Markopoulo
2006–07	Interrupted^{a}				
2007–08	Panathinaikos	3–2	A.O. Markopoulo	27–25, 25–27, 23–25, 25–20, 15–13	Ierapetra
2008–09	Panathinaikos	3–0	Iraklis Thessaloniki	25–21, 26–24, 25–19	Ermoupoli, Syros
2009–10	Panathinaikos	3–1	Olympiacos Piraeus	25–22, 19–25, 25–15, 25–21	Rethymno
2010–11	Olympiacos Piraeus	3–2	AEK	25−22, 17−25, 19−25, 25−18, 15−10	Samos
2011–12	Olympiacos Piraeus	3–2	Panathinaikos	22−25, 25−20, 27−29, 25−19, 15−11	Preveza
2012–13	Olympiacos Piraeus	3–1	AEK	20−25, 25−16, 25−22, 25−22	Thera (Santorini)
2013–14	Olympiacos Piraeus	3–0	Pannaxiakos	25−14, 25−15, 25−21	Pylos
2014–15	Olympiacos Piraeus	3–0	Panathinaikos	25−21, 25−19, 25−22	Agrinio
2015–16	Olympiacos Piraeus	3–0	AEK	25–18, 25–08, 25–13	Chios
2016–17	Olympiacos Piraeus	3–1	Pannaxiakos	19–25, 25–18, 25–21, 25–15	Glyfada, Athens
2017–18	Olympiacos Piraeus	3–0	Pannaxiakos	25–15, 25–16, 25–19	Thera (Santorini)
2018–19	Olympiacos Piraeus	3–1	A.O. Thiras	25–16, 23–25, 25–19, 25–17	Serres
2019–20	postponed due to COVID-19 pandemic virus^{b}				
2020–21	PAOK	3–0	A.O. Thiras	25–20, 25–21, 25–23	Ilioupoli, Athens
2021–22	Panathinaikos	3–1	A.O. Thiras	21–25, 25–22, 25–19, 25–15	Heraklion
2022–23	AEK	3–1	Panathinaikos	25–21, 14–25, 25–20, 25–20	Arta
2023–24	Olympiacos Piraeus	3–0	AEK	25–20, 25–23, 25–22	Loutraki
2024–25	Olympiacos Piraeus	3–2	Panionios Nea Smyrni	17–25, 25–16, 15–25, 25–18, 15–12	Kozani
2025–26	Panionios	3–1	AO Thira	25–17, 25–15, 25–27, 25–20	Chalcis

== Performance by club ==
Club	Cups	Seasons
Olympiacos S.F. Piraeus	11	2011, 2012, 2013, 2014, 2015, 2016, 2017, 2018, 2019, 2024, 2025
Panathinaikos	6	2005, 2006, 2008, 2009, 2010, 2022
Filathlitikos Vrilissia	4	1999, 2000, 2003, 2004
AEK	1	2023
Panellinios	1	2001
ZAON Kifissia	1	2002
PAOK Thessaloniki	1	2021
Panionios G.S.S.	1	2026

== Notes ==
- ^a That year the cup was interrupted because of violent incidents among the fans of Olympiacos and Panathinaikos.
