= Panathinaikos women's volleyball =

Greek women's volleyball team

Panathinaikos
- Nickname: Fine Girls; Amazons
- Founded: 1926; 100 years ago
- Ground: Mets Indoor Hall (Capacity: 1,200)
- Chairman: Dimitris Vranopoulos
- Head Coach: Alessandro Chiappini
- Captain: Penny Rogka
- League: Greek Women's Volleyball League
- 2025–26: 1st (Champions)
- Website: Club home page
- Championships: 27

Uniforms
Home	Away

Panathinaikos AC Women's Volleyball Team is a Greek volleyball team, part of the major Athens-based multi-sport club Panathinaikos A.O. The department was founded in 1969 and is the most successful women's volleyball team in Greece, in terms of Greek Championships won. They have won a record 27 Championships, 6 Cups, with 5 Doubles, while they hold the record for finishing undefeated the Championship 8 times (1971-1973, 1978, 1991, 1992, 1993, 2007). They also hold the record of 68 straight wins in the league including the play-offs.

In addition, they have reached the European Final Four a total of four times and the European final twice (2000 and 2009). The team currently plays in Maroussi Saint Thomas Indoor Hall.

In 2017, the club was relegated due to serious financial problems. They stayed inactive for the 2017–18 season.

Apart from the Greek players, who have traditionally been the backbone of Greece's national team, some European volleyball players that have played for the team include Ruxandra Dumitrescu, Brižitka Molnar, Tammy Mahon, Jelena Lozancic, Olga Tocko, María Fernández, Sanja Tomasević and others.

The club has retired the jersey number 9 in honour of the team's legendary captain Ruxandra Dumitrescu.

== History ==
The women’s volleyball department of the Club was founded in 1926 and is a popular section of the “Shamrock.”

In 1946, it participated in the Central Championship. The coaches were Mike Stergiadis and Christos Svolopoulos, who trained at the court on Tsokha Street.

The first truly organized effort to form a solid team came in 1969, one year before the Hellenic Volleyball Federation was established.

The team’s first coach was Panathinaikos volleyball player Andreas Bergeles, who was later succeeded by Savvas Grozdanovits. The Yugoslav coach worked with the women’s team while simultaneously serving as the men’s team coach.

The team won the Central Championship outright in 1970 and were crowned Greek champions in 1971. The achievements of Panathinaikos and its players became widely recognized when, in the 1980–81 season, the team reached the Final Four of the Confederation Cup in Munich, finishing in 4th place.

In the 1994–95 season, the “Greens” advanced to the Final Four of the Cup Winners’ Cup in Münster, again finishing 4th. In the 1999–2000 season, they made history by competing in the Cup Winners’ Cup in Perugia against the local team.

Their most recent major success came during the 2008–09 season, when they took 2nd place in the Final Four of the Challenge Cup in Jesi, Italy.

In 2008, the women’s volleyball team of Panathinaikos achieved a streak of 55 consecutive wins and 77 consecutive home victories.

The club has won two Greek Championships (1991 and 2013) and three ESPAA Junior Championships (1990, 1991, and 2013).

The “fine girls” have also made great contributions to the Greek National Team. Players such as R. Pragaloudi, S. Angelaki, F. Malapetsa, K. Yaleniou, and E. Sfyri were part of the historic success of winning the bronze medal at the 1991 Mediterranean Games.

The team’s best season is considered to be 2009, when the “fine girls” reached the Challenge Cup final and, at the same time, won the domestic double in Greece.

The players who made history under coach Takis Floros were Chatzinikou, Saparefska, Totsko, Dumitrescu, Tomasevic, Fernandez, Mylona, Tzanakaki, Koutouxidou, and Papageorgiou.

== Honours ==
=== Domestic ===
- Greek Championship (record): (27)
  - 1971, 1972, 1973, 1977, 1978, 1979, 1982, 1983, 1985, 1988, 1990, 1991, 1992, 1993, 1998, 2000, 2005, 2006, 2007, 2008, 2009, 2010, 2011, 2022, 2023, 2024, 2026
- Greek Cup: (6)
  - 2005, 2006, 2008, 2009, 2010, 2022
- Double: (6)
  - 2005, 2006, 2008, 2009, 2010, 2022

=== European ===
- CEV Cup Winners Cup
  - Runners-up (1): 2000
- CEV Challenge Cup
  - Runners-up (2): 2009, 2026

== Current women's volleyball squad ==
The following is the roster for the 2026–2027 season.

Number	Player	Position	Height (m)	Birth date
2	(United States) Micaya White	Outside hitter	1.86	September 20, 1998 (age 28)
6	(Greece) Sofia Greka	Outside hitter	1.82	June 25, 1997 (age 29)
7	(Greece) Elisavet Iliopoulou	Setter	1.77	January 25, 2001 (age 25)
8	(Serbia) Jelena Delić	Middle blocker	1.93	July 17, 2000 (age 26)
10	(Greece) Mara Rapti	Outside hitter	1.78	October 30, 1996 (age 29)
11	(Greece) Lamprini Konstantinidou	Setter	1.84	September 16, 1996 (age 30)
12	(Greece) Aristea Tontai	Middle blocker	1.96	July 5, 1999 (age 27)
13	(Greece) Penny Rogka (c)	Libero	1.67	July 4, 1987 (age 39)
14	(Poland) Monika Lampkowska	Outside hitter	1.83	November 6, 1999 (age 26)
16	(Greece) Georgina Antonakaki	Libero	1.75	September 16, 2002 (age 24)
18	(Greece) Markela Papageorgiou	Middle blocker	1.86	December 22, 1999 (age 26)
20	(Greece) Stamatia Kyparissi	Outside hitter	1.84	June 20, 2002 (age 24)
22	(Czech Republic) Gabriela Orvošová	Opposite	1.91	January 28, 2001 (age 25)
23	(Netherlands) Eline Timmerman	Middle blocker	1.93	December 30, 1998 (age 27)

=== Technical and managerial staff ===
Staff
Head coach	(Italy) Alessandro Chiappini
Assistant coach	(Poland) Michał Szpak
Assistant coach	(Greece) Agi Babouli
Trainer	(Greece) Leonidas Christakidis
Statistician	(Greece) Vassilis Makris
Physiotherapist	(Greece) Dimitris Christodoulakis
Team manager	(Greece) Nikos Lazos

=== Retired numbers ===
Panathinaikos women's volleyball retired numbers
N°	Nat.	Player	Position	Tenure
9	(Romania) (Greece)	Ruxandra Dumitrescu	Outside Hitter	2003–2010

== Selected former players ==
- (Argentina) Jimena Pérez
- (Azerbaijan) (Ukraine) Margarita Stepanenko
- (Bulgaria) Polina Neykova
- (Bulgaria) Daniela Todorova
- (Brazil) Lira Ribas
- (Canada) Jennifer Cross
- (Canada) Marisa Field
- (Canada) Tammy Mahon
- (Canada) Kyla Richey
- (Croatia) Martina Šamadan
- (Cuba) Kenia Carcaces
- (Cuba) Rachel Sánchez
- (Cyprus) Manolina Konstantinou
- (Cyprus) Alexia Rotsidou
- (Czech Republic) Jana Simankova
- (Czech Republic) Jana Zikmundova
- (France) Jelena Lozancic
- (Germany) Jana Franziska Poll
- (Greece) (Albania) Aggi Babuli
- (Greece) Eva Chantava
- (Greece) Eirini Chatziefstratiadou
- (Greece) Eleftheria Chatzinikou
- (Greece) (Romania) Ruxandra Dumitrescu
- (Greece) Eleni Fragiadaki
- (Greece) Maria Garagouni
- (Greece) Niki Garagouni
- (Greece) Sofia Kosma
- (Greece) Nikoletta Koutouxidou
- (Greece) (Romania) Lia Mitsi
- (Greece) Natalia Metaxa
- (Greece) Xanthi Milona
- (Greece) Athina Papafotiou
- (Greece) Chara Sakkoula
- (Greece) Efi Sfyri
- (Greece) Olga Strantzali
- (Greece) Evangelia Tani
- (Greece) Georgia Tzanakaki
- (Latvia) Tatjana Samodanova
- (Latvia) Olga Tocko
- (Netherlands) Maret Grothues
- (Poland) Zanete Pizele
- (Russia) Julia Salcevic
- (Serbia) Milica Budimir
- (Serbia) Jelena Mladenovic
- (Serbia) Brižitka Molnar
- (Serbia) Sanja Tomasevic
- (Slovakia) Romana Hudecová
- (Slovenia) Sonja Borovincek
- (Spain) Marisa Fernández
- (United States) Monique Adams
- (United States) Adora Anae
- (United States) Sherridan Atkinson
- (United States) Haylie Bennett
- (United States) Trisha Bradford

== Selected former coaches ==
- (Serbia) Sava Grozdanović
- (Greece) Andreas Bergeles
- (Greece) Nikos Bergeles
- (Greece) Soulis Toursougas
- (Poland) Jerzy Welz
- (Greece) Giannis Nikolakis
- (Greece) Dimitris Bahramis
- (Greece) Takis Floros

== Historical performance in the league ==
	Panhellenic Championship													A' National						A1 Division																													Pre League	A1 Division						
Pos.	71	72	73	74	75	76	77	78	79	80	81	82	83	84	85	86	87	88	89	90	91	92	93	94	95	96	97	98	99	00	01	02	03	04	05	06	07	08	09	10	11	12	13	14	15	16	17	18	19	20	21	22	23	24	25	26
1	1	1	1	1				1	1	1			1	1		1			1		1	1	1	1					1		1					1	1	1	1	1	1	1										1	1	1		1
2					2	2	2				2	2			2		2	2							2	2		2		2		2		2												2			2							
3																				3							3								3										3		3			3						
4																																	4										4												4	
5																																												5												
6																																																								
7																																																								
8																																																								
9																																																								
10																																																								
11																																																								
12																																																								

=== Positions ===
Position	1st	2nd	3rd	4th	5th
Times	27	15	6	3	1

== International record ==
Season	Achievement	Notes
Champions Cup
1993-94	Quarter-final	eliminated by Matera
Cup Winners Cup
1994-95	Final Four	4th place
1995-96		7th place
1999-00	Final	2nd place, defeated by Perugia
CEV Cup
1980-81	Final Four	4th place
Challenge Cup
2008-09	Final	2nd place, defeated by Vini Monteschiavo Jesi
2009-10	Quarter-final	eliminated by Asterix Kieldrecht
2025-26	Final	2nd place, defeated by Megabox Vallefoglia

== Sponsorships ==
Period	Kit manufacturer	Shirt sponsor
2007–2008	Adidas	Subaru
2008–2009	Adidas	
2009–2010	Asics	Tonotil / Salonpas
2010–2011	Asics	
2011–2012	Asics	Evropi Insurance
2012–2013	Royal	Evropi Insurance
2013–2014	Fila	
2014–2015	-	Bolossis
2015–2016	-	—
2016–2017	Erreà	Allou Fun Park
2018–2019	Athlos Sport	OPAP
2019–2020	Macron	OPAP
2020–2021	Macron	OPAP
2021–2022	Macron	OPAP
2022–2023	Macron	OPAP
2024–2025	Adidas	Pame Stoixima
2025–2026	Adidas	Pame Stoixima

- Official Sport Clothing Manufacturer: Adidas
- Golden Sponsor: Pame Stoixima
- Official sponsors: Hygeia Medical Center, Avance Car Rental, Land Rover Spanos Luxury Cars, Viva Fresh, Batteries.gr, Biosteel, LCG. Boukia kai syhorio.
- Official Broadcaster: PAO TV

== See also ==
- Panathinaikos Men's VC
