= ZAON Kifissia =

Greek multisport club

- Full name: Zirineios Athlitikos Omilos Neon; Ζηρίνειος Αθλητικός Όμιλος Νέων
- Founded: 1962; 64 years ago
- Colours: red and white
- Club titles: 6
- Website: Club home page

ZAON Kifissia (Greek: ΖΑΟΝ Κηφησιάς) is a Greek multisport club based in Kifissia, a suburb of Athens. It was founded in 1962. The full name of the club is Zirineios Athlitikos Omilos Neon (Greek: Ζηρίνειος Αθλητικός Όμιλος Νέων). The club has departments in several sports. The most successful department is the volleyball women team that has won Greek championships and cups. Concretely, the women volleyball team has won five Greek Championships and one Greek Cup. In current season ZAON women volleyball team plays in A2 Ethniki (second division). Seat of the club is the Zirineion gymnasium in Kifissia. The club's colours are red and white.

== Departments ==
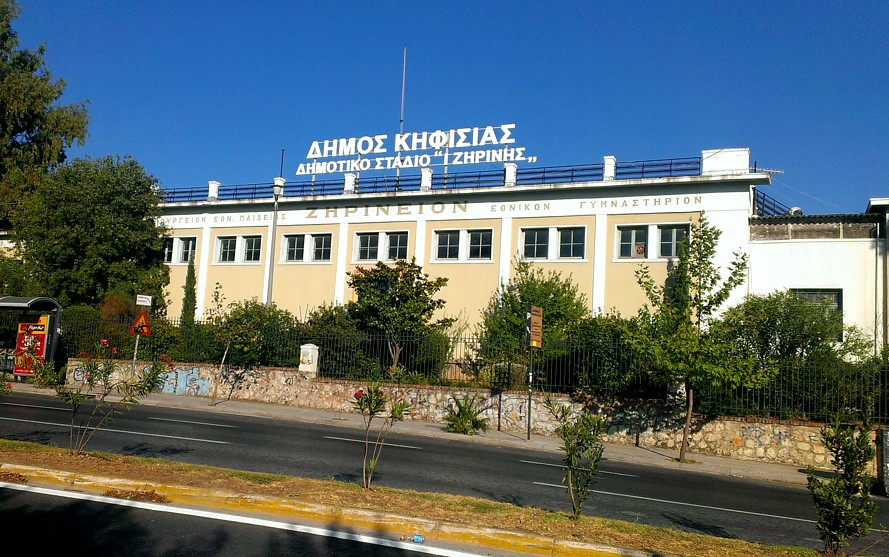
Zirineio Sport Center, the home arena of ZAON

- Women Volleyball
- Women Basketball
- Gymnastics
- Swimming

== Honours ==
Women's volleyball team

- Greek Championship
  - Winners (5): 1974, 1975, 1976, 1980, 1981
- Greek Cup
  - Winners (1): 2002
