= AO Markopoulo =

Sports club based in East Attica, Greece

AO Markopoulou
- Full name: Markopoulo Sports Club
- Founded: 1988; 38 years ago
- League: A1 Ethniki
- Based in: Markopoulo Mesogaias, Greece
- Home ground: Municipal Indoor Hall of Markopoulo
- Colours: blue, red
- Chairman: Paris Evangeliou
- Manager: (Greece) Giorgos Roussis
- 2025-26: 11th
- Website: http://www.aom.gr

AO Markopoulo (Greek: Αθλητικός Όμιλος Μαρκοπούλου) is a multi-sport club based in Markopoulo Mesogeas, in Attica, with their most successful department being the Woman's volley team which participates in the A1 Ethniki.

== Description ==
Its official year of foundation is 1988 and it competes in dark blue, red and white. The club has sections of volleyball, ju jitsu, gymnastics (gymnastics and acrobatics) and chess. Until 2015, A.O.M. had a basketball department at the club before it was ceded to O.KA.M. (Mesogeia Basketball Club).

The headquarters of A.O. Markopoulo is the Municipal Indoor Hall of Markopoulo, with a capacity of 1,100 spectators. The chairman of the board of directors is Paris Evangeliou.

A.O. Markopoulo is a continuation of the respective sections of another club of the region, Marko F.C. The latter was founded in 1927 and today is exclusively engaged in football.

== Women's Team roster ==
Season 2026–2027

2026–2027 Team
Number	Player	Position	Height (m)	Birth date
3	(Greece) Christina Paidokouki	Setter	1.78	1 January 2008 (age 18)
4	(United States) Addison Haluska	Middle Hitter	1.83	4 July 2004 (age 22)
5	(United States) Taylor Jacobsen	Outside Hitter	1.85	27 October 2001 (age 24)
6	(Greece) Christina Nikolaidi	Middle Blocker	1.86	3 March 2006 (age 20)
7	(Greece) Aikaterini Allagianni	Middle Hitter	1.86	15 June 2004 (age 22)
8	(Greece) Antonina Kontoudi	Libero	1.76	11 July 2010 (age 16)
9	(Greece) Antigoni Dímou	Middle Hitter	1.90	9 September 2009 (age 17)
11	(United States) Kayla Giroux	Middle Blocker	1.88	18 March 2004 (age 22)
14	(Poland) Agata Michalewicz	Setter	1.81	28 April 1998 (age 28)
16	(Turkey) Derya Güç	Outside Hitter	1.86	16 January 1997 (age 29)
17	(Greece) Ioanna Tileli	Outside Hitter	1.88	28 May 2008 (age 18)
19	(Greece) Athanasía Andriopoulou	Outside Hitter	1.90	28 February 2009 (age 17)
20	(Greece) Georgia-Loula Angelopoulou	Outside Hitter	1.80	11 February 2005 (age 21)
27	(Greece) Maria Christopoulou	Libero	1.65	11 July 2010 (age 16)
88	(Greece) Dimitra Razakia	Outside Hitter	1.83	8 September 2009 (age 17)
