= FO Vrilissia =

Greek volleyball club

- Full name: Filathlitikos Omilos Vrilissia; Φιλαθλητικός Όμιλος Βριλησσίων
- Founded: 1985
- Colours: red and white
- Chairman: Evangelos Kovaios
- Titles: 9
- Website: Club home page

FO Vrilissia, full name Filathlitikos Omilos Vrilissia (Greek: Φιλαθλητικός Όμιλος Βριλησσίων) is a Greek volleyball club based in Vrilissia in the regional unit of North Athens, Attica. It is mainly active in women volleyball and it is one of the most successful clubs in this sport. FO Vrilissia has won 9 Panhellenic titles in women volleyball (5 championships and 4 cups). Despite its successful presence the club retreated from the championship in season 2014-15 due to financial problems and relegated to second tier championship (A2 Ethniki).

== History ==
FO Vrilissia was founded in 1985. At season 1994-95, it won the first championship. Thereafter the club won another four championship (the last in 2003), and four cups (the last in 2004). The next years the club faced financial problems. At season 2005-06 withdrew from the championship and relegated to second tier championship (A2 Ethniki). It returned in 2011 but four years later withdrew again from the championship and relegated in A2 Ethniki.

=== Recent seasons ===
Season	Division	Place	Notes
2009-10	A2 Ethniki	9th	
2010-11	A2 Ethniki	1st	Promoted to A1
2011-12	A1 Ethniki	6th	
2012-13	A1 Ethniki	8th	
2013-14	A1 Ethniki	4th	
2014-15	A1 Ethniki	12th	Withdrew, Relegated to A2
2015-16	A2 Ethniki	4th	

== Titles ==
- Greek Women's Volleyball Championship
  - Winner (5): 1995, 1996, 1997, 1999, 2004
- Greek Women's Volleyball Cup
  - Winner (4): 1999, 2000, 2003, 2004
