= Filathlitikos Thessaloniki =

Greek volleyball club

Filathlitikos
Fullname	Φιλαθλητικός (Filathlitikos)
Arena	Αλεξάνδρειο Μέλαθρον
Team Colors	White, Red and blue

Filathlitikos was a women's volleyball team from Thessaloniki in the Greek Women's Volleyball League. It won four championships, dominating the end of 1980s. It won its last championship in the 2002–03 season before going into decline. In the 2006–7 season, the team was relegated from the first division championship because of financial problems and its place was taken by Epikouros Polichnis. The decline continued and finally Filathlitikos was corporate one year 2003-4 with PAOK women's team, and later dissolved

== 2011–2012 squad ==
- Anna Keramidas
- Koutsonika Immortality
- Mariangela Charavelouli
- Kaletsiou Hero
- Baldoka Evanthia
- Demetra Anagnostopoulos
- Argyropoulou Marina
- Alexandridis Mary
- Venetis Cleo
- Spyros Evi
- Milioni Sultana
- Koutroubis Andromache
- Tsantopoulou Lys
- Helen Tzavara
- John Veronica
- Helen Baziana

== Titles ==
- National Championships (4)
  - 1984
  - 1986
  - 1987
  - 2003
