= Panionios V.C. =

Greek volleyball club

- Full name: Panionios V.C.
- Founded: 1913
- Ground: Panionios Indoor Hall, Nea Smyrni, Greece
- League: A2 Ethniki

Uniforms
Home	Away

Panionios Volleyball Club is the volleyball department of the Greek multisport club of Panionios, based in Nea Smirni. It is one of the oldest sport sections of the club, with a presence since the early 20th century. The colours of the club are red and blue and its home arena is the Panionios Indoor Hall.

== History ==
The volleyball department of Panionios was founded in 1913 and was one of the first departments of the club. It was active as long as Panionios was in Smyrna. After the move of Panionios in Greece the volleyball team came to the country. Panionios was the team which brought volleyball to Greece. Before then, there was not any volley competition in Greece. Panionios starred in the interwar period Athenian championships, regulated by SEGAS. In the post-war period, the section dissolved and was refounded in 1970.

On 1987 the Women's Volleyball Academy is founded with mini and pangolin teams. Fruits of this effort are the conquest of the Panhellenic Championship of Pagorasides in the period 1993-94 and the corresponding of the Girls in the period 1995-96.

== Men's team ==
The volleyball department of Panionios is the first in Greece since it was founded in Smyrna in 1913. In 1919 a volleyball championship was held in Smyrna with the participation of eight clubs and the winner was Panionios. It was the first organization of volleyball games by Greek teams. The volleyball players of the club came mainly from the track and the main ones were: Dimitros Karabatis (nail), Panagiotis Retellas, Costas Papazoglou (passer), A. Vassiliadis, Kl. Drivas, Er. Isigonis and later George R.

The club's men's team remained in the lower divisions of the championship until recently. The season 2014-15 Panionios finished in the first place of the local ESPEDA championship and was promoted to A2 for the first time in its history.

=== Recent seasons ===
Season	Division	Place	Notes
2012-13	ESPEDA	5th	
2013-14	ESPEDA	3rd	
2014-15	ESPEDA	1st	Promoted to A2 Ethniki
2015-16	A2 Ethniki	5th	
2016-17	A2 Ethniki	5th	
2017-18	A2 Ethniki	3rd	
2018-19	A2 Ethniki	3rd	
2019-20	A2 Ethniki	5th	

== Women's team ==
Panionios was a pioneer in women's volleyball. From 1926 to 1930 he organized a "Women's Club Volleyball Championship" as well as a juniors championship among the girls 'schools of Athens under the name "Girls' Championship". The women's team of the club was formed in 1926 and participated in the championship of 1927. It consisted of L. Karabatis, A. and K. Nikolopoulou, T. Paschalidou, T. Venieropoulou, and V. Karni.

In 1928 the women's team won the Athens championship undefeated. In the qualifying group they defeated A.O. Neanidon, N. Vyronos and American College of Girls P. Faliro and qualified for the semifinals. There they prevailed over the G.O. Greek women with 15-9, 15-9. In the final he found A.O. Neanidon again, whom they defeated with 2-1 sets (7-15, 15-4, 15-4).

This year began the three-year undefeated course of the women's team of Panionios in the Athens championship, which ended in July 1930 from Paleo Faliro, in the semifinals of the Athens championship, in a match in which the blue and reds left protesting against a decision.

On February 3, 1930, the women's volleyball team of the club went to Chalkida, where it played against S.A. Chalkida, on the occasion of sports games held there. This was probably the first time a women's sports team went to the province because it was invited to a match.

Contrary to the men's team, the women's team played in first-tier division (A1 Ethniki) for five consecutive years, from 2007 to 2012. In 2005 the women's team won the B Ethniki Championship and rose to the A2 Ethniki category. Following, in 2007 the team won the A2 Ethniki Championship and was promoted to A1 Ethniki. In 2012, the team finished 11th and was relegated to A2 Ethniki category. Nowadays the women team plays in Pre League (2nd-tier).

=== Recent season ===
Season	Division	Place	Notes
2006-07	A2 Ethniki	1st	Promoted to A1
2007-08	A1 Ethniki	7th	
2008-09	A1 Ethniki	4th	
2009-10	A1 Ethniki	4th	
2010-11	A1 Ethniki	9th	
2011-12	A1 Ethniki	11th	Relegated to A2
2012-13	A2 Ethniki	6th	
2013-14	A2 Ethniki	5th	
2014-15	A2 Ethniki	5th	
2015-16	A2 Ethniki	9th	
2016-17	A2 Ethniki	9th	Promoted to Pre League
2017-18	Pre League	4th	
2018-19	Pre League	10th	
2019-20	Pre League	7th	

=== Current roster ===
2024-2025

Players:

- (Greece) Ioanna Karelia
- (Greece) Theodora Boki
- (Greece) Elena Patrineli
- (Greece) Nefeli Chatzigrigoriou
- (Greece) Zoe Georgiou
- (Greece) Theodora Sarakatsani
- (Greece) Bianka Guri
- (Greece) Danai Koudouna
- (Belarus) Lizaveta Chabai
- (Greece) Elena Baka
- (Greece) Maria Kanelou
- (Greece) Maria Nomikou
- Matea Ikić
- Kristina Guncheva
- Bianka Buša
- Sherridan_Atkinson

Head coach:

- Dragan Nešić
