= A1 Ethniki Women's Volleyball =

Women's volleyball league in Greece

Greek Women's Volleyball League
- Sport: Volleyball
- Founded: 1970-71
- No. of teams: 12
- Country: Greece
- Continent: Europe
- Most recent champion: Panathinaikos (27)
- Most titles: Panathinaikos (27)
- Relegation to: Pre League
- Domestic cup: Greek Cup
- Website: https://volleyball.gr/

The Greek Women's Volleyball League is organised by Hellenic Volleyball Federation (Greek:Ελληνική Ομοσπονδία Πετοσφαίρισης).
Panathinaikos won the first championship in 1971. During the first decade, Panathinaikos and ZAON Kifissia dominated. Panathinaikos have won 26 championships.

== Teams ==
Location of clubs for the 2024-25 Women's Volleyleague season

The clubs for the 2024-25 season:

=== Teams ===
Club	Home city
AEK	Athens
A.O. Thiras	Santorini
AO Lamias 2013	Lamia
AO Markopoulo	Markopoulo Mesogaias
AON Amazones	Nea Erithrea
AONS Milon	Nea Smyrni
Aris	Thessaloniki
ASP Thetis	Voula
Panionios	Nea Smyrni
Olympiacos	Piraeus
Panathinaikos	Athens
PAOK	Thessaloniki

== Title holders ==
The title holders are the following:

- 1970–71 Panathinaikos (1)
- 1971–72 Panathinaikos (2)
- 1972–73 Panathinaikos (3)
- 1973–74 ZAON (1)
- 1974–75 ZAON (2)
- 1975–76 ZAON (3)
- 1976–77 Panathinaikos (4)
- 1977–78 Panathinaikos (5)
- 1978–79 Panathinaikos (6)
- 1979–80 ZAON (4)
- 1980–81 ZAON (5)
- 1981–82 Panathinaikos (7)
- 1982–83 Panathinaikos (8)
- 1983–84 Filathlitikos Thessaloniki (1)
- 1984–85 Panathinaikos (9)
- 1985–86 Filathlitikos Thessaloniki (2)
- 1986–87 Filathlitikos Thessaloniki (3)
- 1987–88 Panathinaikos (10)
- 1988–89 Ionikos Nea Filadelfeia (1)
- 1989–90 Panathinaikos (11)
- 1990–91 Panathinaikos (12)
- 1991–92 Panathinaikos (13)
- 1992–93 Panathinaikos (14)
- 1993–94 Ionikos Nea Filadelfeia (2)
- 1994–95 FO Vrilissia (1)
- 1995–96 FO Vrilissia (2)
- 1996–97 FO Vrilissia (3)
- 1997–98 Panathinaikos (15)
- 1998–99 FO Vrilissia (4)
- 1999–00 Panathinaikos (16)
- 2000–01 Panellinios (1)
- 2001–02 Panellinios (2)
- 2002–03 Filathlitikos Thessaloniki (4)
- 2003–04 FO Vrilissia (5)
- 2004–05 Panathinaikos (17)
- 2005–06 Panathinaikos (18)
- 2006–07 Panathinaikos (19)
- 2007–08 Panathinaikos (20)
- 2008–09 Panathinaikos (21)
- 2009–10 Panathinaikos (22)
- 2010–11 Panathinaikos (23)
- 2011–12 AEK (1)
- 2012–13 Olympiacos Piraeus (1)
- 2013–14 Olympiacos Piraeus (2)
- 2014–15 Olympiacos Piraeus (3)
- 2015–16 Olympiacos Piraeus (4)
- 2016–17 Olympiacos Piraeus (5)
- 2017–18 Olympiacos Piraeus (6)
- 2018–19 Olympiacos Piraeus (7)
- 2019–20 Olympiacos Piraeus (8)
- 2020–21 no champion (COVID-19 pandemic)
- 2021–22 Panathinaikos (24)
- 2022–23 Panathinaikos (25)
- 2023–24 Panathinaikos (26)
- 2024–25 Olympiacos Piraeus (9)
- 2025–26 Panathinaikos (27)

== Performance by club ==
Club	Titles	Seasons
Panathinaikos	27	1971, 1972, 1973, 1977, 1978, 1979, 1982, 1983, 1985, 1988, 1990, 1991, 1992, 1993, 1998, 2000, 2005, 2006, 2007, 2008, 2009, 2010, 2011, 2022, 2023, 2024 ,2026
Olympiacos Piraeus	9	2013, 2014, 2015, 2016, 2017, 2018, 2019, 2020, 2025
ZAON Kifissia	5	1974, 1975, 1976, 1980, 1981
FO Vrilissia	5	1995, 1996, 1997, 1999, 2004
Filathlitikos Thessaloniki	4	1984, 1986, 1987, 2003
Ionikos Nea Filadelfeia	2	1989, 1994
Panellinios	2	2001, 2002
AEK	1	2012

== Sponsors and supporters ==
- Hellenic Broadcasting Corporation
- TrainOSE
- ANEK Lines
- Blue Star Ferries

== See also ==
- A1 Ethniki Men's Volleyball
