= 2026 Women's European Volleyball Championship squads =

This article shows all participating team squads at the 2026 Women's European Volleyball Championship, held in Azerbaijan, Czech Republic, Sweden and Turkey from 21 August to 6 September 2026.

== Pool A ==
=== Germany ===
The following is the German roster in the 2026 European Championship.

- Head coach: (Italy) Giulio Cesare Bregoli
- 1 Patricia Nestler L
- 3 Annie Cesar L
- 8 Hannah Kohn S
- 9 Lina Alsmeier OS
- 12 Hanna Orthmann OS
- 13 Emilia Weske OP
- 14 Marie Schölzel MB
- 15 Romy Jatzko OS
- 16 Anastasia Cekulaev MB
- 18 Leana Grozer OS
- 20 Lena Kindermann OP
- 21 Camilla Weitzel MB
- 22 Monique Strubbe MB
- 23 Sarah Straube S

=== Hungary ===
The following is the Hungarian roster in the 2026 European Championship.

- Head coach: (Italy) Alessandro Chiappini
- 1 Alíz Kump MB
- 5 Anna Zsombók MB
- 7 Fanni Fekete MB
- 10 Gréta Pampuch OS
- 11 Réka Bozóki-Szedmák OS
- 12 Nóra Kiss S
- 13 Anett Németh OP
- 15 Lilla Kiss OS
- 16 Brigitta Petrenkó S
- 18 Anna Szalai L
- 20 Petra Kertész L
- 22 Eszter Zsombók OP
- 24 Luca Németh OP
- 44 Zsófia Csereklye MB

=== Latvia ===
The following is the Latvian roster in the 2026 European Championship.

- Head coach: (Italy) Daniele Capriotti
- 1 Elīna Zvaigzne L
- 4 Marta Kamēlija Levinska OP
- 5 Megija Dambrehte) OP
- 7 Megija Grundmane L
- 8 Elvita Dolotova S
- 10 Kristīne Kramēna OS
- 11 Paula Nikola Ņečiporuka OS
- 12 Anna Rīta MB
- 14 Marta Gintere MB
- 16 Anija Jurdža OS
- 17 Junora Vāgele MB
- 18 Elza Reknere S
- 20 Karmena Struka MB
- 21 Šarlote Šlitere OS

=== Poland ===
The following is the Polish roster in the 2026 European Championship.

- Head coach: (Italy) Stefano Lavarini
- 1 Julia Szczurowska OP
- 3 Magdalena Stysiak OS
- 6 Anna Obiała MB
- 8 Julita Piasecka OP
- 12 Aleksandra Szczygłowska L
- 14 Monika Lampkowska OS
- 15 Martyna Czyrniańska OS
- 16 Sonia Stefanik MB
- 18 Justyna Łysiak L
- 21 Alicja Grabka S
- 24 Paulina Damaske OS
- 26 Katarzyna Wenerska S
- 27 Maja Koput MB
- 95 Magdalena Jurczyk MB

=== Slovenia ===
The following is the Slovenian roster in the 2026 European Championship.

- Head coach: (Italy) Alessandro Orefice
- 1 Eva Pavlović Mori S
- 3 Žana Godec OS
- 4 Maša Pucelj OS
- 5 Lorena Lorber Fijok OS
- 6 Fatoumatta Sillah OS
- 10 Polona Frelih OP
- 11 Mirta Velikonja Grbac MB
- 12 Tara Filipič L
- 13 Nika Milošič MB
- 17 Zoja Donko L
- 18 Saša Planinšec MB
- 19 Pia Cvijić MB
- 21 Žana Ivana Halužan Sagadin S
- 22 Iza Koren OS

=== Turkey ===
The following is the Turkish roster in the 2026 European Championship.

- Head coach: (Italy) Daniele Santarelli
- 1 Gizem Örge L
- 3 Cansu Özbay S
- 4 Melissa Vargas OP
- 6 Saliha Şahin OS
- 7 Hande Baladın OS
- 8 Sinead Jack MB
- 10 Eylül Akarçeşme L
- 11 Derya Cebecioğlu OS
- 12 Elif Şahin S
- 14 Eda Erdem Dündar MB
- 15 Deniz Uyanık MB
- 18 Zehra Güneş MB
- 20 Yaprak Erkek OS
- 22 İlkin Aydın OS

== Pool B ==
=== Austria ===
The following is the Austrian roster in the 2026 European Championship.

- Head coach: Roland Schwab
- 2 Carmen Raab OS
- 7 Aida Korman Mehić MB
- 8 Jana Gärtner MB
- 10 Julia Trunner OP
- 12 Victoria Deisl S
- 13 Lina Hinteregger OS
- 14 Kora Schaberl OS
- 15 Marie-Kristin Bruckner OS
- 16 Anamarija Galić OP
- 17 Dana Schmit S
- 18 Nina Nesimović MB
- 19 Eva Stabentheiner L
- 20 Diana Vavrek OP
- 24 Dagmar Hensel MB

=== Bulgaria ===
The following is the Bulgarian roster in the 2026 European Championship.

- Head coach: (Italy) Marcello Abbondanza
- 1 Emileta Racheva OS
- 3 Lora Slavcheva S
- 9 Monika Krasteva OS
- 11 Mariya Krivoshiyska MB
- 13 Mila Pashkuleva L
- 15 Zhana Todorova L
- 16 Boryana Angelova MB
- 19 Aleksandra Milanova OS
- 20 Iva Dudova OS
- 23 Mikaela Stoyanova OS
- 26 Tsvetelina Ilieva OS
- 33 Kaya Nikolova MB
- 66 Margarita Guncheva S
- 77 Elena Kolarova MB

=== Czech Republic ===
The following is the Czech roster in the 2026 European Championship.

- Head coach: (Greece) Ioannis Athanasopoulos
- 1 Ema Kneiflová MB
- 5 Eva Svobodová OS
- 6 Helena Grozer OS
- 8 Ela Koulisiani MB
- 9 Daniela Jansová L
- 10 Kateřina Valková S
- 11 Veronika Dostálová L
- 15 Magdalena Jehlárová MB
- 16 Michaela Mlejnková OS
- 17 Magdalena Bukovksa OS
- 18 Pavla Šmídová S
- 22 Gabriela Orvošová OP
- 25 Monika Brancuská MB
- 28 Bára Rejmanová OS

=== Greece ===
The following is the Greek roster in the 2026 European Championship.

- Head coach: Apostolos Oikonomou
- 1 Eirini Chatziefstratiadou MB
- 3 Elpida Tikmanidou OS}
- 4 Evangelia Tani S
- 6 Styliani Gkiourda OS
- 10 Maria Klepkou OS
- 11 Lamprini Konstantinidou S
- 13 Effrosyni Bakodimou OS
- 14 Maria-Aikaterini Xanthopoulou L
- 16 Georgina Antonakaki L
- 18 Markella Papageorgiou MB
- 20 Georgia-Loula Angelopoulou OS
- 28 Errika-Pelagia Gravari MB
- 31 Martha Anthouli OP

=== Serbia ===
The following is the Serbian roster in the 2026 European Championship.

- Head coach: Zoran Terzić
- 1 Vanja Ivanović OS
- 3 Minja Osmajić MB
- 5 Mina Popović MB
- 8 Slađana Mirković S
- 10 Maja Ognjenović S
- 11 Hena Kurtagić MB
- 13 Anja Zubić OP
- 15 Aleksandra Uzelac OS
- 16 Aleksandra Jegdić L
- 18 Tijana Bošković OP
- 24 Ljubica Milojević MB
- 25 Nina Čajić OS
- 32 Bojana Gočanin L
- 34 Branka Tica OS

=== Ukraine ===
The following is the Ukrainian roster in the 2026 European Championship.

- Head coach: (Poland) Jakub Głuszak
- 1 Oleksandra Milenko OS
- 2 Diana Meliushkyna MB
- 4 Alika Lutsenko L
- 6 Andriana Pavlyk OS
- 7 Svitlana Dorsman MB
- 9 Stanislava Parfonova S
- 10 Valeriia Nudha OS
- 11 Viktoriia Danchak OP
- 14 Daria Sharhorodska S
- 19 Anna Artyshuk OP
- 21 Kima Zharkova MB
- 22 Arina Boiko L
- 23 Yuliia Dymar OS
- 26 Ulyana Kotar MB

== Pool C ==
=== Azerbaijan ===
The following is the Azerbaijani roster in the 2026 European Championship.

- Head coach: Faig Garayev
- 1 Jeyran Imanova L
- 3 Yelyzaveta Ruban OS
- 5 Raziya Aliyeva S
- 6 Ayshan Abdulazimova MB
- 7 Narmina Musayeva OS
- 8 Ulkar Karimova OS
- 11 Aynur Imanova MB
- 14 Kristina Besman S
- 16 Yuliya Karimova L
- 17 Polina Rahimova OP
- 19 Bayaz Guluyeva L
- 20 Margarita Stepanenko OP
- 21 Kseniya Pavlenko OS
- 22 Maria Kirilyuk MB

=== Belgium ===
The following is the Belgian roster in the 2026 European Championship.

- Head coach: Kris Vansnick
- 2 Elise Van Sas S
- 3 Britt Herbots OS
- 4 Nathalie Lemmens MB
- 5 Tea Radovic OS
- 7 Anna Koulberg MB
- 8 Lara Nagels S
- 9 Nel Demeyer L
- 10 Pauline Martin OP
- 16 Noor Debouck OS
- 18 Britt Rampelberg L
- 20 Britt Fransen MB
- 22 Liese Verhelst OP
- 23 Pauline Luyten OS
- 24 Flore Maes MB

=== Netherlands ===
The following is the Dutch roster in the 2026 European Championship.

- Head coach: (Germany) Felix Koslowski
- 2 Marije ten Brinke MB
- 3 Hester Jasper L
- 5 Jolien Knollema OS
- 8 Suus Gerritsen MB
- 10 Sarah van Aalen S
- 11 Laura Jansen OS
- 12 Britt Bongaerts S
- 14 Nicole van de Vosse OP
- 16 Indy Baijens MB
- 18 Marrit Jasper OS
- 20 Helena Corina Kok OS
- 21 Britte Stuut MB
- 25 Florien Reesink L
- 26 Elles Dambrink OP

=== Portugal ===
The following is the Portuguese roster in the 2026 European Championship.

- Head coach: Hugo Silva
- 1 Amanda Cavalcanti MB
- 3 Rita Campos L
- 4 Matilde Rodrigues L
- 5 Mariana Garcêz S
- 6 Joana Conceição OS
- 7 Ana Monteiro OS
- 9 Alice Clemente OS
- 10 Inês Campos OS
- 11 Julia Kavalenka OP
- 12 Ana Figueiras S
- 13 Margarida Maia OS
- 14 Maria Lopes OP
- 15 Joana Garcêz MB
- 16 Raissa Cassamá MB

=== Romania ===
The following is the Romanian roster in the 2026 European Championship.

- Head coach: (Spain) Guillermo Naranjo Hernandez
- 1 Diana Ariton MB
- 2 Diana-Teodora Vereș L
- 3 Rodica Buterez OS
- 5 Raluca Alexandra Buran OS
- 6 Carolina Radu S
- 7 Didona Zadorojnai OP
- 8 Bianca-Maria Grama MB
- 9 Iarina-Luana Axinte S
- 10 Ioana Baciu OP
- 15 Sorina Miclaus OS
- 29 Tara-Anamaria Cristea MB
- 32 Eliza Oțet L
- 33 Andreea Cimpu MB
- 77 Ana-Cristina Miron OS

=== Spain ===
The following is the Spanish roster in the 2026 European Championship.

- Head coach: Pascual Saurin
- 1 Ariadna Priante S
- 2 Zoi Mavrommatis OS
- 4 Lola Margarita Hernández van den Bosch MB
- 8 Margalida Pizà L
- 9 Patricia Aranda S
- 11 Júlia de Paula OP
- 12 Lucia Varela MB
- 13 Patricia Llabrés L
- 16 María Priscilla Schlegel OS
- 17 Ana Escamilla OS
- 18 Carla Jiménez Ruiz MB
- 22 Raquel Lázaro S
- 24 Jimena Fernándes OP
- 28 Carolina Camino OS

== Pool D ==
=== Croatia ===
The following is the Croatian roster in the 2026 European Championship.

- Head coach: Igor Arbutina
- 1 Karla Antunović S
- 2 Mika Grbavica OP
- 3 Ema Strunjak MB
- 4 Božana Butigan MB
- 5 Andrea Mihaljević OP
- 7 Mirta Freund MB
- 9 Maša Mlinar OS
- 10 Luna Bečić OS
- 12 Josipa Marković OS
- 13 Samanta Fabris OP
- 15 Viktoria Ana Trcol MB
- 17 Vedrana Jakšetić S
- 19 Izabela Štimac L
- 20 Leonarda Grabić OS

=== France ===
The following is the French roster in the 2026 European Championship.

- Head coach: (Spain) César Hernández
- 2 Nawelle Chouikh-Barbez OS
- 3 Amandine Giardino L
- 4 Lilou Ratahiry OS
- 7 Iman Ndiaye OP
- 10 Fatoumata Fanguédou MB
- 15 Amandha Sylves MB
- 16 Léandra Olinga-Andela MB
- 18 Ève Mathi S
- 19 Cyrielle Depie OP
- 21 Eva Elouga MB
- 35 Énora Danard-Selosse S
- 88 Amélie Rotar OS
- 91 Halimatou Bah OS
- 99 Juliette Gelin L

=== Italy ===
The following is the Italian roster in the 2026 European Championship.

- Head coach: Julio Velasco
- 2 Denise Meli MB
- 3 Carlotta Cambi S
- 5 Ilaria Spirito L
- 7 Eleonora Fersino L
- 8 Alessia Orro S
- 11 Anna Danesi MB
- 14 Linda Nkiruka Nwakalor MB
- 15 Merit Adigwe OP
- 16 Stella Nervini OS
- 17 Miriam Sylla OS
- 18 Paola Egonu OP
- 19 Sarah Fahr MB
- 22 Gaia Giovannini OS
- 24 Ekaterina Antropova OP

=== Montenegro ===
The following is the Montenegrin roster in the 2026 European Championship.

- Head coach: (Serbia) Jovo Caković
- 1 Saška Đurović MB
- 2 Tijana Tvrdišić S
- 3 Nikoleta Perović OP
- 4 Melisa Cenović L
- 5 Marija Šušić S
- 6 Teodora Čavić OS
- 7 Lara Jovović OS
- 10 Dijana Vuković OP
- 11 Simona Petranović OS
- 13 Milica Veličković L
- 16 Lana Rakočević MB
- 17 Darja Popović OS
- 18 Katarina Budrak OS
- 22 Mina Dragović MB

=== Slovakia ===
The following is the Slovakian roster in the 2026 European Championship.

- Head coach: (Italy) Martino Volpini
- 1 Zuzana Justhová L
- 2 Zuzana Šepeľová OS
- 3 Karolína Cibulová S
- 4 Lucia Herdová OS
- 5 Radka Hašková OS
- 6 Barbora Truchlá MB
- 7 Ema Smiešková MB
- 11 Katrin Trebichavská OS
- 14 Tereza Hrušecká MB
- 15 Karolína Fričová OS
- 16 Anna Kohútová S
- 18 Karin Šunderlíková OP
- 19 Katarína Körmendyová MB
- 22 Ema Magdinová L

=== Sweden ===
The following is the Swedish roster in the 2026 European Championship.

- Head coach: (Italy) Lorenzo Micelli
- 1 Erica Muhizi MB
- 2 Maya Tabron OS
- 3 Linda Andersson MB
- 5 Cecilia Malm OS
- 8 Elma Olofsson MB
- 10 Isabelle Haak OP
- 12 Hilda Gustafsson S
- 13 Filippa Brink L
- 14 Hanna Hellvig OS
- 16 Vilma Julevik S
- 17 Anna Haak OS
- 21 Malin Hallin MB
- 22 Martha Edlund OP
- 24 Elsa Nordin Ottosson L

== See also ==
- 2026 Men's European Volleyball Championship squads
