= 2026 Women's European Volleyball Championship final round =

Volleyball tournament results

The final round of the 2026 Women's European Volleyball Championship will take place from 30 August to 6 September 2026.

== Qualified teams ==
The top four from each group advanced to the knockout stage.

Group	Winners	Runners-up	Third place	Fourth place
A	Poland; 4TH Place	Turkey; CHAMPION	Slovenia; Eliminated 1/8	Germany; Eliminated QF
B	Serbia; 3RD Place	Czech Republic; Eliminated 1/8	Greece; Eliminated QF	Bulgaria; Eliminated 1/8
C	Belgium; Eliminated 1/8	Netherlands; Eliminated QF	Azerbaijan; Eliminated 1/8	Portugal; Eliminated 1/8
D	Italy; 2ND Place	France; Eliminated 1/8	Sweden; Eliminated QF	Croatia; Eliminated 1/8

== Bracket ==
Round of 16
31 August – Istanbul
Poland	3
Portugal	0
31 August – Istanbul
Netherlands	3
Slovenia	2
31 August – Brno
Italy	3
Bulgaria	0
31 August – Brno
Czech Republic	0
Sweden	3
1 September – Istanbul
Belgium	2
Germany	3
1 September – Istanbul
Turkey	3
Azerbaijan	0
30 August – Brno
Serbia	3
Croatia	1
30 August – Brno
France	0
Greece	3

Quarterfinals
3 September – Istanbul
Poland	3
Netherlands	1
2 September – Brno
Italy	3
Sweden	1
3 September – Istanbul
Germany	1
Turkey	3
2 September – Brno
Serbia	3
Greece	0

Semifinals
5 September – Istanbul
Poland	1
Italy	3
5 September – Istanbul
Turkey	3
Serbia	0

Final
6 September – Istanbul
Italy	2
Turkey	3
3rd place match
6 September – Istanbul
Poland	1
Serbia	3

== Round of 16 ==
30 August 2026; 16:00; Match duration: 1hr 18min	France	0–3	Greece	Brno Exhibition Centre, Brno; Attendance: 825; Referees: Marco van Zanten (NED), Ágnes Bátkai-Katona (HUN)
30 August 2026; 16:00; Match duration: 1hr 18min	(16–25, 18–25, 20–25); Report			Brno Exhibition Centre, Brno; Attendance: 825; Referees: Marco van Zanten (NED), Ágnes Bátkai-Katona (HUN)
30 August 2026; 16:00; Match duration: 1hr 18min	Scoring leaders			Brno Exhibition Centre, Brno; Attendance: 825; Referees: Marco van Zanten (NED), Ágnes Bátkai-Katona (HUN)
Depie 12		Total	Anthouli 20
Depie (11/24)		Attack	Anthouli (17/26)
Depie, Fanguedou 1		Block	three players 2
Ndiaye (3/7)		Serve	Bakodimou, Chatziefstratiadou 2

30 August 2026; 19:00; Match duration: 1hr 36min	Serbia	3–1	Croatia	Brno Exhibition Centre, Brno; Attendance: 1,167; Referees: Sonja Simonovska (MNE), Raquel Portela (POR)
30 August 2026; 19:00; Match duration: 1hr 36min	(19–25, 25–19, 25–17, 25–12); Report			Brno Exhibition Centre, Brno; Attendance: 1,167; Referees: Sonja Simonovska (MNE), Raquel Portela (POR)
30 August 2026; 19:00; Match duration: 1hr 36min	Scoring leaders			Brno Exhibition Centre, Brno; Attendance: 1,167; Referees: Sonja Simonovska (MNE), Raquel Portela (POR)
Bošković, Uzelac 18		Total	Fabris, Grbavica 15
Bošković (17/33)		Attack	Fabris (14/41)
Kurtagić 6		Block	Butigan 2
three players 1		Serve	Grbavica (2/16)

31 August 2026; 16:00; Match duration: 2hr 29min	Netherlands	3–2	Slovenia	Sinan Erdem Dome, Istanbul; Attendance: 258; Referees: Theodora Kyriopoulou (GRE), Bartlomiej Adamczyk (POL)
31 August 2026; 16:00; Match duration: 2hr 29min	(25–18, 19–25, 25–21, 29–31, 15–9); Report			Sinan Erdem Dome, Istanbul; Attendance: 258; Referees: Theodora Kyriopoulou (GRE), Bartlomiej Adamczyk (POL)
31 August 2026; 16:00; Match duration: 2hr 29min	Scoring leaders			Sinan Erdem Dome, Istanbul; Attendance: 258; Referees: Theodora Kyriopoulou (GRE), Bartlomiej Adamczyk (POL)
Dambrink 24		Total	Lorber 22
Dambrink (21/47)		Attack	Lorber (19/48)
Baijens 3		Block	Sillah 3
Baijens (4/16)		Serve	Lorber (1/22)

31 August 2026; 16:00; Match duration: 1hr 07min	Italy	3–0	Bulgaria	Brno Exhibition Centre, Brno; Attendance: 2185; Referees: Ágnes BÁTKAI-Katona (HUN), Marco Van Zanten (NED)
31 August 2026; 16:00; Match duration: 1hr 07min	(25–17, 25–13, 25–13); Report			Brno Exhibition Centre, Brno; Attendance: 2185; Referees: Ágnes BÁTKAI-Katona (HUN), Marco Van Zanten (NED)
31 August 2026; 16:00; Match duration: 1hr 07min	Scoring leaders			Brno Exhibition Centre, Brno; Attendance: 2185; Referees: Ágnes BÁTKAI-Katona (HUN), Marco Van Zanten (NED)
Antropova 18		Total	Milanova 12
Egonu (11/24)		Attack	Milanova (12/25)
three players 2		Block	Krivoshiiska 1
Antropova (6/14)		Serve	Krivoshiiska (1/7)

31 August 2026; 19:00; Match duration: 1hr 24min	Czech Republic	0–3	Sweden	Brno Exhibition Centre, Brno; Attendance: 5,021; Referees: Vladimir Simonovic (SWI), Sonja Simonovska (MNE)
31 August 2026; 19:00; Match duration: 1hr 24min	(19–25, 23–25, 21-25); Report			Brno Exhibition Centre, Brno; Attendance: 5,021; Referees: Vladimir Simonovic (SWI), Sonja Simonovska (MNE)
31 August 2026; 19:00; Match duration: 1hr 24min	Scoring leaders			Brno Exhibition Centre, Brno; Attendance: 5,021; Referees: Vladimir Simonovic (SWI), Sonja Simonovska (MNE)
Brancuská 16		Total	Haak 31
Brancuská (16/36)		Attack	Haak (31/53)
Grozer, Jehlářová 1		Block	Andersson 3
Grozer, Koulisiani 1		Serve	Julevik (3/17)

31 August 2026; 19:00; Match duration: 1hr 28min	Poland	3–0	Portugal	Sinan Erdem Dome, Istanbul; Attendance: 607; Referees: Bogdan Laurentiu Stoica (ROM), Predrag Balandzic (SER)
31 August 2026; 19:00; Match duration: 1hr 28min	(25–18, 25–17, 25–23); Report			Sinan Erdem Dome, Istanbul; Attendance: 607; Referees: Bogdan Laurentiu Stoica (ROM), Predrag Balandzic (SER)
31 August 2026; 19:00; Match duration: 1hr 28min	Scoring leaders			Sinan Erdem Dome, Istanbul; Attendance: 607; Referees: Bogdan Laurentiu Stoica (ROM), Predrag Balandzic (SER)
Stysiak 22		Total	Clemente, Kavalenka 10
Stysiak (22/44)		Attack	Clemente, Kavalenka 9
Czyrniańska 3		Block	J. Garcez, Kavalenka 1
Koput, Lampkowska 1		Serve	M. Garcez (2/12)

1 September 2026; 16:00; Match duration: 2hr 23min	Belgium	2–3	Germany	Sinan Erdem Dome, Istanbul; Attendance: 674; Referees: Bartlomiej Adamczyk (POL), Vanya Parvanova (BUL)
1 September 2026; 16:00; Match duration: 2hr 23min	(25–20, 21–25, 20–25, 27–25, 8–15); Report			Sinan Erdem Dome, Istanbul; Attendance: 674; Referees: Bartlomiej Adamczyk (POL), Vanya Parvanova (BUL)
1 September 2026; 16:00; Match duration: 2hr 23min	Scoring leaders			Sinan Erdem Dome, Istanbul; Attendance: 674; Referees: Bartlomiej Adamczyk (POL), Vanya Parvanova (BUL)
Martin 23		Total	Grozer 28
Martin (23/55)		Attack	Grozer (24/49)
Fransen, Lemmens 2		Block	three players 3
Luyten, Nagels 2		Serve	Alsmeier (3/23)

1 September 2026; 19:00; Match duration: 1hr 19min	Turkey	3–0	Azerbaijan	Sinan Erdem Dome, Istanbul; Attendance: 8,104; Referees: Predrag Balandzic (SER), Theodora Kyriopoulou (GRE)
1 September 2026; 19:00; Match duration: 1hr 19min	(25–14, 25–16, 25–22); Report			Sinan Erdem Dome, Istanbul; Attendance: 8,104; Referees: Predrag Balandzic (SER), Theodora Kyriopoulou (GRE)
1 September 2026; 19:00; Match duration: 1hr 19min	Scoring leaders			Sinan Erdem Dome, Istanbul; Attendance: 8,104; Referees: Predrag Balandzic (SER), Theodora Kyriopoulou (GRE)
Vargas 16		Total	Rahimova 12
Vargas (12/26)		Attack	Rahimova (10/31)
Güneş 4		Block	Abdulazimova 2
Vargas (3/14)		Serve	Kirilyuk, Rahimova 1

== Quarterfinals ==
2 September 2026; 16:00; Match duration: 1hr 12min	Serbia	3–0	Greece	Brno Exhibition Centre, Brno; Attendance: 1,234; Referees: Marco Van Zanten (NED), Sonja Simonovska (MNE)
2 September 2026; 16:00; Match duration: 1hr 12min	(25–14, 25–20, 25–17); Report			Brno Exhibition Centre, Brno; Attendance: 1,234; Referees: Marco Van Zanten (NED), Sonja Simonovska (MNE)
2 September 2026; 16:00; Match duration: 1hr 12min	Scoring leaders			Brno Exhibition Centre, Brno; Attendance: 1,234; Referees: Marco Van Zanten (NED), Sonja Simonovska (MNE)
Bošković 17		Total	Anthouli, Tikmanidou 9
Bošković (13/30)		Attack	Anthouli (9/32)
Bošković, Ognjenović 2		Block	Tikmanidou 1
Bošković, Uzelac 2		Serve	'three players' 1

2 September 2026; 19:00; Match duration: 1hr 51min	Italy	3–1	Sweden	Brno Exhibition Centre, Brno; Attendance: 1,745; Referees: Raquel Portela (POR), Vladimir Simonovic (SWI)
2 September 2026; 19:00; Match duration: 1hr 51min	(21–25, 26–24, 25–21, 25–23); Report			Brno Exhibition Centre, Brno; Attendance: 1,745; Referees: Raquel Portela (POR), Vladimir Simonovic (SWI)
2 September 2026; 19:00; Match duration: 1hr 51min	Scoring leaders			Brno Exhibition Centre, Brno; Attendance: 1,745; Referees: Raquel Portela (POR), Vladimir Simonovic (SWI)
Egonu 27		Total	Haak 42
Egonu (25/49)		Attack	Haak (38/78)
Danesi 2		Block	Andersson 4
Egonu (2/10)		Serve	Haak (3/16)

3 September 2026; 16:00; Match duration: 2hr 09min	Poland	3–1	Netherlands	Sinan Erdem Dome, Istanbul; Attendance: 2,414; Referees: Predrag Balandzic (SRB), Bogdan Laurentiu Stoica (ROM)
3 September 2026; 16:00; Match duration: 2hr 09min	(25–16, 20–25, 25–20, 25–23); Report			Sinan Erdem Dome, Istanbul; Attendance: 2,414; Referees: Predrag Balandzic (SRB), Bogdan Laurentiu Stoica (ROM)
3 September 2026; 16:00; Match duration: 2hr 09min	Scoring leaders			Sinan Erdem Dome, Istanbul; Attendance: 2,414; Referees: Predrag Balandzic (SRB), Bogdan Laurentiu Stoica (ROM)
Piasecka, Stysiak 14		Total	Dambrink 18
Piasecka (14/41)		Attack	Dambrink (16/45)
Jurczyk, Koput 5		Block	Baijens 5
four players 1		Serve	Baijens, Stuut 2

3 September 2026; 19:00; Match duration: 2hr 02min	Germany	1–3	Turkey	Sinan Erdem Dome, Istanbul; Attendance: 12,314; Referees: Vanya Parvanova (BUL), Bartlomiej Adamczyk (POL)
3 September 2026; 19:00; Match duration: 2hr 02min	(18–25, 25–22, 18–25, 22–25); Report			Sinan Erdem Dome, Istanbul; Attendance: 12,314; Referees: Vanya Parvanova (BUL), Bartlomiej Adamczyk (POL)
3 September 2026; 19:00; Match duration: 2hr 02min	Scoring leaders			Sinan Erdem Dome, Istanbul; Attendance: 12,314; Referees: Vanya Parvanova (BUL), Bartlomiej Adamczyk (POL)
Alsmeier 13		Total	Vargas 26
Alsmeier (13/38)		Attack	Vargas (17/41)
Weitzel 3		Block	Vargas 4
Kohn (2/10)		Serve	Vargas (5/21)

== Semifinals ==
5 September 2026; 16:00; Match duration: 1hr 26min	Turkey	3–0	Serbia	Sinan Erdem Dome, Istanbul; Attendance: 15,824; Referees: Theodora Kyriopoulou (GRE), Raquel Portela (POR)
5 September 2026; 16:00; Match duration: 1hr 26min	(25–20, 25–19, 25–20); Report			Sinan Erdem Dome, Istanbul; Attendance: 15,824; Referees: Theodora Kyriopoulou (GRE), Raquel Portela (POR)
5 September 2026; 16:00; Match duration: 1hr 26min	Scoring leaders			Sinan Erdem Dome, Istanbul; Attendance: 15,824; Referees: Theodora Kyriopoulou (GRE), Raquel Portela (POR)
Vargas 18		Total	Bošković 14
Vargas (15/33)		Attack	Bošković (12/35)
Erdem, Güneş 3		Block	Kurtagić 3
Baladın (2/11)		Serve

5 September 2026; 19:00; Match duration: 1hr 38min	Poland	1–3	Italy	Sinan Erdem Dome, Istanbul; Attendance: 6,824; Referees: Vladimir Simonović (SRB), Vanya Parvanova (BUL)
5 September 2026; 19:00; Match duration: 1hr 38min	(19–25, 19–25, 25–21, 16–25); Report			Sinan Erdem Dome, Istanbul; Attendance: 6,824; Referees: Vladimir Simonović (SRB), Vanya Parvanova (BUL)
5 September 2026; 19:00; Match duration: 1hr 38min	Scoring leaders			Sinan Erdem Dome, Istanbul; Attendance: 6,824; Referees: Vladimir Simonović (SRB), Vanya Parvanova (BUL)
Szczurowska 15		Total	Egonu 20
Szczurowska (15/31)		Attack	Egonu (17/32)
Jurczyk 2		Block	Danesi, Fahr 4
five players 1		Serve	four players 1

== 3rd place match ==
6 September 2026; 16:00; Match duration: 1hr 49min	Poland	1–3	Serbia	Sinan Erdem Dome, Istanbul; Attendance: 3,739; Referees: Raquel Portela (POR), Bogdan Laurentiu Stoica (ROM)
6 September 2026; 16:00; Match duration: 1hr 49min	(21–25, 19–25, 25–15, 18–25); Report			Sinan Erdem Dome, Istanbul; Attendance: 3,739; Referees: Raquel Portela (POR), Bogdan Laurentiu Stoica (ROM)
6 September 2026; 16:00; Match duration: 1hr 49min	Scoring leaders			Sinan Erdem Dome, Istanbul; Attendance: 3,739; Referees: Raquel Portela (POR), Bogdan Laurentiu Stoica (ROM)
Stysiak 28		Total	Bošković 29
Stysiak (26/56)		Attack	Bošković (26/55)
Koput 3		Block	Kurtagić 5
four players 1		Serve	three players 1

== Final ==
6 September 2026; 19:00; Match duration: 2hr 02min	Italy	2–3	Turkey	Sinan Erdem Dome, Istanbul; Attendance: 17,299; Referees: Vladimir Simonović (SRB), Theodora Kyriopoulou (GRE)
6 September 2026; 19:00; Match duration: 2hr 02min	(25–16, 22–25, 25–12, 21–25, 10–15); Report			Sinan Erdem Dome, Istanbul; Attendance: 17,299; Referees: Vladimir Simonović (SRB), Theodora Kyriopoulou (GRE)
6 September 2026; 19:00; Match duration: 2hr 02min	Scoring leaders			Sinan Erdem Dome, Istanbul; Attendance: 17,299; Referees: Vladimir Simonović (SRB), Theodora Kyriopoulou (GRE)
Egonu 28		Total	Vargas 28
Egonu (22/56)		Attack	Vargas (26/61)
Danesi 5		Block	Güneş 6
Antropova (5/20)		Serve	Erdem, Şahin 1
