= 2025 FIVB Women's Volleyball World Championship squads =

This article shows the roster of all the participating teams at the 2025 FIVB Women's Volleyball World Championship. Each team names a list of a minimum 12 players and a maximum 14 players.

== Group A ==
=== Thailand ===
The following was Thailand's roster at the 2025 Women's Volleyball World Championship.

Head coach: (Thailand) Kiattipong Radchatagriengkai

- 1 Kalyarat Khamwong L
- 2 Piyanut Pannoy L
- 3 Pornpun Guedpard S
- 4 Donphon Sinpho OH
- 5 Thatdao Nuekjang MB
- 6 Warisara Seetaloed OH
- 11 Sasipaporn Janthawisut OH
- 12 Hattaya Bamrungsuk MB
- 15 Natthanicha Jaisaen S
- 16 Pimpichaya Kokram O
- 18 Ajcharaporn Kongyot OH
- 19 Chatchu-on Moksri OH
- 21 Thanacha Sooksod O
- 29 Wimonrat Thanaphan MB

=== Netherlands ===
The following was Netherlands's roster at the 2025 Women's Volleyball World Championship.

Head coach: (Germany) Felix Koslowski

- 2 Marije ten Brinke MB
- 8 Suus Gerritsen MB
- 10 Sarah van Aalen S
- 12 Britt Bongaerts S
- 13 Nicole van de Vosse O
- 17 Iris Vos OH
- 18 Marrit Jasper OH
- 19 Nika Daalderop OH
- 20 Jet Kok OH
- 21 Britte Stuut MB
- 23 Eline Timmerman MB
- 25 Florien Reesink L
- 26 Elles Dambrink O
- 30 Laura Jansen L

=== Sweden ===
The following was Sweden's roster at the 2025 Women's Volleyball World Championship.

Head coach: (Italy) Lorenzo Micelli

- 2 Maya Tabron OH
- 3 Linda Andersson MB
- 8 Sonja Rundcrantz S
- 10 Isabelle Haak O
- 11 Alexandra Lazic OH
- 12 Hilda Gustafsson S
- 13 Filippa Brink L
- 15 Kirsten van Leusen MB
- 17 Anna Haak OH
- 18 Julia Nilsson MB
- 20 Martha Edlund O
- 22 Sabrina Phinizy OH
- 23 Elsa Arrestad MB
- 24 Elsa Nordin Ottosson L

=== Egypt ===
The following was Egypt's roster at the 2025 Women's Volleyball World Championship.

Head coach: (Egypt) Emad Nawar

- 1 Nada Morgan MB
- 2 Nada Essa L
- 4 Nada Meawad OH
- 9 Habiba Zaatar L
- 11 Sarah Amin Ahmed OH
- 12 Toqaallah Eassa O
- 13 Nourallah Amin O
- 14 May Abdelmaguid MB
- 16 Hana Abdelazize S
- 17 Aya Ahmed MB
- 18 Dana Emam S
- 20 Mariam Metwally OH
- 22 Dalia Morshedy Ashraf MB

== Group B ==
=== Italy ===
The following was Italy's roster at the 2025 Women's Volleyball World Championship.

Head coach: (Argentina) (Italy) Julio Velasco

- 3 Carlotta Cambi S
- 6 Monica De Gennaro L
- 7 Eleonora Fersino L
- 8 Alessia Orro S
- 10 Benedetta Sartori MB
- 11 Anna Danesi MB
- 16 Stella Nervini OH
- 17 Myriam Sylla OH
- 18 Paola Egonu O
- 19 Sarah Fahr MB
- 21 Loveth Omoruyi OH
- 22 Gaia Giovannini OH
- 24 Ekaterina Antropova O
- 25 Yasmina Akrari MB

=== Belgium ===
The following was Belgium's roster at the 2025 Women's Volleyball World Championship.

Head coach: (Belgium) Kris Vansnick

- 2 Elise Van Sas S
- 3 Britt Herbots OH
- 4 Nathalie Lemmens MB
- 5 Tea Radovic OH
- 7 Anna Koulberg MB
- 8 Lara Nagels S
- 9 Nel Demeyer OH
- 10 Pauline Martin O
- 12 Charlotte Krenicky S
- 16 Noor Debouck L
- 18 Britt Rampelberg L
- 19 Silke Van Avermaet MB
- 20 Britt Fransen MB
- 22 Liese Verhelst O

=== Cuba ===
The following was Cuba's roster at the 2025 Women's Volleyball World Championship.

Head coach: (Cuba) Wilfredo Robinson

- 1 Lisania Grafort O
- 2 Evilania Martínez OH
- 3 Yensy Kindelán MB
- 4 Lianet García Anglada MB
- 5 Dayana Martínez MB
- 6 Yalain de la Peña O
- 8 Yanisleidis Sánchez O
- 9 Brenda Nold Ferrer S
- 11 Gretell Moreno S
- 12 Yamilena Ruiz L
- 14 Claudia Tarin OH
- 19 Laura Suárez MB
- 21 Whitney James OH
- 99 Dezirett Madan O

=== Slovakia ===
The following was Slovakia's roster at the 2025 Women's Volleyball World Championship.

Head coach: (Slovakia) Michal Mašek

- 1 Emma Erteltová MB
- 2 Barbora Koseková S
- 3 Simona Jelínková OH
- 4 Lucia Herdová OH
- 6 Karin Palgutová OH
- 9 Ema Smiešková MB
- 10 Nina Wienand Herelová MB
- 11 Skarleta Jančová L
- 14 Tereza Hrušecká MB
- 15 Karolína Fričová OH
- 16 Anna Kohútová S
- 18 Karin Šunderlíková O
- 20 Zuzana Šepeľová OH
- 22 Ema Magdinová L

== Group C ==
=== Brazil ===
The following was Brazil's roster at the 2025 Women's Volleyball World Championship.

Head coach: (Brazil) José Roberto Guimarães

- 2 Diana Duarte MB
- 3 Macris Carneiro S
- 4 Lorena Viezel MB
- 7 Rosamaria Montibeller O
- 8 Júlia Kudiess MB
- 9 Roberta Ratzke S
- 10 Gabriela Guimarães OH
- 11 Luzia Nezzo MB
- 15 Helena Wenk Hoengen OH
- 16 Kisy Nascimento O
- 17 Júlia Bergmann OH
- 19 Tainara Santos O
- 22 Laís Vasques L
- 30 Marcelle Mattos da Silva L

=== Puerto Rico ===
The following was Puerto Rico's roster at the 2025 Women's Volleyball World Championship.

Head coach: (Puerto Rico) Juan Carlos Núñez

- 2 Shara Venegas L
- 4 Dariana Hollingsworth O
- 5 Wilmarie Rivera S
- 6 Jennifer Nogueras S
- 8 Valeria Vázquez OH
- 10 Diana Reyes MB
- 12 Neira Ortiz MB
- 13 Paulina Pérez OH
- 15 Adriana Rodríguez MB
- 16 Paola Santiago OH
- 17 Decelise Champion O
- 18 Alba Hernández MB
- 19 Karla Santos OH
- 24 Okiana Valle L

=== France ===
The following was France's roster at the 2025 Women's Volleyball World Championship.

Head coach: (Spain) César Hernández

- 1 Héléna Cazaute OH
- 2 Nawelle Chouikh-Barbez OH
- 3 Amandine Giardino L
- 7 Iman Ndiaye O
- 9 Nina Stojiljković S
- 10 Fatoumata Fanguedou MB
- 11 Lucille Gicquel O
- 15 Amandha Sylves MB
- 21 Éva Elouga MB
- 35 Énora Danard-Selosse S
- 78 Camille Massuel MB
- 88 Amélie Rotar O
- 98 Sabine Haewegene OH
- 99 Juliette Gélin L

=== Greece ===
The following was Greece's roster at the 2025 Women's Volleyball World Championship.

Head coach: (Greece) Apostolos Oikonomou

- 2 Maria-Eleni Artakianou L
- 6 Elpida Tikmanidou OH
- 7 Georgia Lamprousi MB
- 8 Andromachi Tsiogka MB
- 9 Aristea Tontai MB
- 10 Maria-Aikaterini Xanthopoulou L
- 11 Lamprini Konstantinidou S
- 12 Olga Strantzali OH
- 13 Effrosyni Bakodimou OH
- 14 Kyriaki Terzoglou MB
- 15 Eleni Baka OH
- 17 Eleni Karakasi S
- 21 Maria Tsitsigianni O
- 91 Martha Anthouli O

== Group D ==
=== United States ===
The following was United States's roster at the 2025 Women's Volleyball World Championship.

Head coach: (United States) Erik Sullivan

- 2 Jordyn Poulter S
- 3 Avery Skinner OH
- 5 Alexandra Frantti OH
- 6 Morgan Hentz L
- 7 Lexi Rodriguez L
- 9 Madisen Skinner O
- 13 Amber Igiede MB
- 16 Dana Rettke MB
- 22 Sarah Franklin OH
- 24 Chiaka Ogbogu MB
- 25 Tia Jimerson MB
- 32 Saige Kaahaaina-Torres S
- 33 Logan Eggleston OH
- 34 Stephanie Samedy O

=== Czech Republic ===
The following was Czech Republic's roster at the 2025 Women's Volleyball World Championship.

Head coach: (Greece) Ioannis Athanasopoulos

- 1 Ema Kneiflová MB
- 4 Silvie Pavlová MB
- 5 Eva Svobodová OH
- 6 Helena Grozer OH
- 7 Magdalena Bukovská OH
- 8 Ela Koulisiani MB
- 9 Daniela Digrinová L
- 10 Kateřina Valková S
- 11 Veronika Dostálová L
- 15 Magdaléna Jehlářová MB
- 16 Michaela Mlejnková OH
- 17 Klára Dítě OH
- 20 Květa Grabovská S
- 25 Monika Brancuská O

=== Argentina ===
The following was Argentina's roster at the 2025 Women's Volleyball World Championship.

Head coach: (Argentina) Daniel Castellani

- 1 Elina Maria Rodríguez OH
- 3 Azul Benítez S
- 5 Candela Sol Salinas OH
- 6 Bianca Bertolino OH
- 7 Dalma Pérez OH
- 9 Bianca Cugno O
- 10 Daniela Bulaich OH
- 12 Avril García MB
- 14 Victoria Mayer S
- 15 Antonela Fortuna L
- 18 Martina Bednarek O
- 19 Brenda Graff MB
- 20 Agostina Pelozo L
- 21 Micaela Cabrera MB

=== Slovenia ===
The following was Slovenia's roster at the 2025 Women's Volleyball World Championship.

Head coach: (Italy) Alessandro Orefice

- 1 Eva Pavlović Mori S
- 3 Žana Godec OH
- 5 Lorena Lorber Fijok OH
- 6 Fatoumatta Sillah OH
- 7 Emi Jurič L
- 8 Evá Zatkovič O
- 9 Mija Šiftar OH
- 10 Polona Frelih O
- 11 Mirta Velikonja Grbac MB
- 13 Nika Milošič MB
- 15 Anja Mazej L
- 18 Saša Planinšec MB
- 19 Katja Banko OH
- 21 Žana Halužan Sagadin S

== Group E ==
=== Turkey ===
The following was Turkey's roster at the 2025 Women's Volleyball World Championship.

Head coach: (Italy) Daniele Santarelli

- 1 Gizem Örge L
- 3 Cansu Özbay S
- 4 Melissa Vargas O
- 7 Hande Baladın OH
- 8 Sinead Jack Kısal MB
- 11 Derya Cebecioğlu OH
- 12 Elif Şahin S
- 14 Eda Erdem Dündar MB
- 18 Zehra Güneş MB
- 19 Aslı Kalaç MB
- 20 Yaprak Erkek OH
- 22 İlkin Aydın OH
- 23 Eylül Akarçeşme L
- 99 Ebrar Karakurt OH

=== Canada ===
The following was Canada's roster at the 2025 Women's Volleyball World Championship.

Head coach: (Italy) Giovanni Guidetti

- 4 Vicky Savard OH
- 5 Julia Murmann L
- 10 Courtney Baker S
- 11 Andrea Mitrovic OH
- 14 Hilary Howe OH
- 16 Abagayle Guezen OH
- 17 Kacey Jost L
- 18 Anna Smrek O
- 19 Emily Maglio MB
- 20 Lucy Borowski O
- 26 Quinn Pelland S
- 27 Nyadholi Thokbuom MB
- 32 Thana Fayad OH
- 37 Jessica Andrews MB

=== Bulgaria ===
The following was Bulgaria's roster at the 2025 Women's Volleyball World Championship.

Head coach: (Bulgaria) Antonina Zetova

- 1 Iveta Stanchulova OH
- 2 Nasya Dimitrova MB
- 4 Mariya Krivoshiyska MB
- 7 Lora Kitipova S
- 11 Hristina Hristova Vuchkova MB
- 13 Mila Pashkuleva L
- 18 Darina Naneva MB
- 19 Aleksandra Milanova OH
- 23 Mikaela Stoyanova O
- 28 Merelin Nikolova O
- 32 Kalina Veneva OH
- 34 Dimana Ivanova S
- 35 Viktoria Ninova L
- 66 Miroslava Paskova OH

=== Spain ===
The following was Spain's roster at the 2025 Women's Volleyball World Championship.

Head coach: (Spain) Pascual Saurín

- 1 Ariadna Priante S
- 2 Zoi Mavrommatis OH
- 4 Lola Hernández MB
- 8 Margalida Pizà L
- 9 Patricia Aranda S
- 11 Julia de Paula O
- 12 Lucía Varela MB
- 13 Patricia Llabrés L
- 16 María Schlegel OH
- 17 Ana Escamilla OH
- 18 Carla Jiménez MB
- 22 Raquel Lázaro S
- 24 Jimena Fernández O
- 33 María Segura OH

== Group F ==
=== China ===
The following was China's roster at the 2025 Women's Volleyball World Championship.

Head coach: (China) Zhao Yong

- 1 Wu Mengjie OH
- 2 Zhuang Yushan OH
- 3 Tang Xin OH
- 5 Yin Xiaolan S
- 6 Gong Xiangyu O
- 7 Wang Yuanyuan MB
- 8 Wan Ziyue MB
- 10 Yang Shuming O
- 12 Li Yingying OH
- 15 Chen Houyu MB
- 17 Ni Feifan L
- 18 Wang Mengjie L
- 21 Gao Yi MB
- 23 Zhang Zixuan S

=== Dominican Republic ===
The following was Dominican Republic's roster at the 2025 Women's Volleyball World Championship.

Head coach: (Brazil) Marcos Kwiek

- 2 Yaneirys Rodríguez L
- 3 Florangel Terrero MB
- 5 Brenda Castillo L
- 8 Alondra Tapia O
- 11 Geraldine González MB
- 12 Yokaty Pérez S
- 13 Massiel Matos OH
- 15 Madeline Guillén OH
- 16 Yonkaira Peña OH
- 18 Camila de la Rosa S
- 20 Brayelin Martínez OH
- 21 Jineiry Martínez MB
- 22 Samaret Caraballo OH
- 23 Gaila González O

=== Colombia ===
The following was Colombia's roster at the 2025 Women's Volleyball World Championship.

Head coach: (Brazil) Guilherme Schmitz

- 3 Dayana Segovia O
- 4 Laura Pascua OH
- 5 Ana Karina Olaya OH
- 6 Valerin Carabalí MB
- 7 Katherin Ramirez MB
- 8 Laura Zapata L
- 10 Juliana Toro L
- 11 Karen Rentería O
- 15 María Marín S
- 16 Melissa Rangel MB
- 18 Helen Lozano MB
- 19 Wendy Vargas OH
- 25 Doris Manco S
- 29 Emelys Martínez OH

=== Mexico ===
The following was Mexico's roster at the 2025 Women's Volleyball World Championship.

Head coach: (Italy) Nicola Negro

- 1 Uxue Guereca OH
- 2 Samantha Bricio OH
- 3 Sofía Maldonado O
- 6 Grecia Castro OH
- 7 Argentina Ung S
- 10 Arleth Márquez MB
- 11 Jocelyn Urías MB
- 12 Joseline Landeros L
- 14 Ximena Solar MB
- 15 Karen Rivera S
- 16 Angela Muñoz L
- 20 Aime Topete OH
- 23 Melanie Parra OH
- 33 Karina Flores Gamez MB

== Group G ==
=== Poland ===
The following was Poland's roster at the 2025 Women's Volleyball World Championship.

Head coach: (Italy) Stefano Lavarini

- 1 Aleksandra Gryka MB
- 3 Magdalena Stysiak O
- 4 Marlena Kowalewska S
- 5 Agnieszka Korneluk MB
- 8 Julita Piasecka OH
- 11 Martyna Łukasik OH
- 12 Aleksandra Szczygłowska L
- 15 Martyna Czyrniańska OH
- 16 Sonia Stefanik MB
- 17 Malwina Smarzek O
- 18 Justyna Łysiak L
- 24 Paulina Damaske OH
- 26 Katarzyna Wenerska S
- 95 Magdalena Jurczyk MB

=== Germany ===
The following was Germany's roster at the 2025 Women's Volleyball World Championship.

Head coach: (Italy) Giulio Bregoli

- 4 Anna Pogany L
- 5 Corina Glaab S
- 6 Antonia Stautz OH
- 9 Lina Alsmeier OH
- 10 Lena Stigrot OH
- 11 Pia Timmer OH
- 12 Hanna Orthmann OH
- 13 Emilia Weske O
- 14 Marie Schölzel MB
- 16 Anastasia Cekulaev MB
- 17 Patricia Nestler L
- 21 Camilla Weitzel MB
- 22 Monique Strubbe MB
- 23 Sarah Straube S

=== Kenya ===
The following was Kenya's roster at the 2025 Women's Volleyball World Championship.

Head coach: (Kenya) Geoffrey Onyango

- 1 Emmaculate Misoki S
- 2 Frida Boke Mwita S
- 4 Mercy Likhayo O
- 5 Pamella Owino O
- 7 Belinda Barasa MB
- 9 Lorine Chebet MB
- 10 Daisy Jepkorir OH
- 11 Veronica Adhiambo Oluoch OH
- 13 Juliana Namutira OH
- 15 Sande Meldinah Nemali OH
- 16 Gladys Ekaru MB
- 17 Celestine Nafula L
- 19 Sharleen Sembel Maywa L
- 24 Malyne Tata O

=== Vietnam ===
The following was Vietnam's roster at the 2025 Women's Volleyball World Championship.

Head coach: (Vietnam) Nguyễn Tuấn Kiệt

- 3 Trần Thị Thanh Thúy OH
- 8 Lê Thanh Thúy MB
- 11 Hoàng Thị Kiều Trinh O
- 12 Nguyễn Khánh Đang L
- 14 Võ Thị Kim Thoa S
- 15 Nguyễn Thị Trinh MB
- 16 Vi Thị Như Quỳnh OH
- 17 Nguyễn Thị Phương OH
- 18 Phạm Thị Hiền MB
- 19 Đoàn Thị Lâm Oanh S
- 20 Nguyễn Thị Uyên OH
- 25 Trần Thị Bích Thủy MB
- 27 Nguyễn Thị Ninh Anh OH

== Group H ==
=== Japan ===
The following was Japan's roster at the 2025 Women's Volleyball World Championship.

Head coach: (Turkey) Ferhat Akbaş

- 2 Ayaka Araki MB
- 3 Haruyo Shimamura MB
- 4 Mayu Ishikawa OH
- 6 Nanami Seki S
- 8 Manami Kojima L
- 11 Nichika Yamada MB
- 12 Satomi Fukudome L
- 13 Yukiko Wada OH
- 15 Airi Miyabe MB
- 19 Miiku Iwasawa OH
- 22 Tsukasa Nakagawa S
- 26 Yoshino Sato OH
- 30 Ayane Kitamado OH
- 33 Miku Akimoto OH

=== Serbia ===
The following was Serbia's roster at the 2025 Women's Volleyball World Championship.

Head coach: (Serbia) Zoran Terzić

- 2 Katarina Dangubić OH
- 5 Mina Popović MB
- 8 Slađana Mirković S
- 11 Hena Kurtagić MB
- 12 Teodora Pušić L
- 14 Maja Aleksić MB
- 15 Aleksandra Uzelac OH
- 16 Aleksandra Jegdić L
- 18 Tijana Bošković O
- 19 Bojana Milenković OH
- 26 Maša Kirov MB
- 27 Vanja Bukilić O
- 28 Marija Miljević S
- 40 Vanja Ivanović OH

=== Ukraine ===
The following was Ukraine's roster at the 2025 Women's Volleyball World Championship.

Head coach: (Poland) Jakub Głuszak

- 1 Oleksandra Milenko OH
- 2 Diana Meliushkyna MB
- 4 Alika Lutsenko L
- 6 Krystyna Niemtseva L
- 7 Svitlana Dorsman MB
- 8 Polina Herasymchuk MB
- 9 Stanislava Parfonova S
- 12 Valeriia Nudha OH
- 14 Daria Sharhorodska S
- 18 Mariia Kaplanska OH
- 19 Anna Artyshuk O
- 23 Andriana Pavlyk O
- 24 Anastasiia Kraiduba O
- 26 Uliana Kotar MB

=== Cameroon ===
The following was Cameroon's roster at the 2025 Women's Volleyball World Championship.

Head coach: (Brazil) Paulo de Tarso Milagres

- 1 Baran Sourea MB
- 2 Yolande Amana Guigolo S
- 3 Ivan Nancy Mbira S
- 4 Joan Ahellya Tchombe OH
- 5 Paule Arielle Olomo MB
- 6 Danna Fosso Nguemtchueng OH
- 8 Brandy Ngatcheu OH
- 9 Marie Zambo Ayomba MB
- 11 Carine Blamdai O
- 14 Andréa Mimosette Moussol OH
- 16 Estelle Adiana O
- 17 Reine Ngameni Mbopda Davina L
- 19 Christelle Bilebel L
- 20 Cécile-Laure Nabyong MB

== See also ==
- 2025 FIVB Women's Volleyball Nations League squads
- 2025 FIVB Men's Volleyball World Championship squads
