= 2026 Women's European Volleyball Championship Pool B =

Volleyball tournament results

Pool B is one of four pools of the preliminary round of the 2026 Women's European Volleyball Championship. The pool consists of the Austria, Bulgaria, co-hosts Czech Republic, Greece, Serbia, and Ukraine. All games were played at the Brno Exhibition Centre in Brno from 21 to 27 August 2026. The top four teams advanced to the final round. The group winners were Serbia, who won all their games. The teams joining the Serbs were Czech Republic, Greece and Bulgaria.

== Teams ==
Team	Qualification method	Date of qualification	Appearance(s)				Previous best performance (Note: Bold text indicates they hosted that edition.)	WR (Note: World ranking at start of tournament.)
Team	Qualification method	Date of qualification	Total	First	Last	Streak	Previous best performance	WR
Bulgaria	Top eight in 2023	27 August 2023	32nd	1950	2023	31	Champions (1981)	31
Serbia	Top eight in 2023	28 August 2023	10th	2007	2023	10	Champions (2011, 2017, 2019)	10
Czech Republic (Note: Czech Republic also belatedly qualified as a 2026 host nation.)	Top eight in 2023	28 August 2023	13th	1995	2023	3	Third place (1997)	14
Ukraine	Ninth in 2023	26 September 2023	11th	1993	2023	5	Third place (1993)	18
Greece	Pool F winner	6 August 2025	8th	1985	2023	4	Eighth place (1991)	29
Austria	Five best runner-ups	10 August 2025	4th	1958	1971	1	12th place (1958, 1963)	43

== Venue ==
The currently in construction Arena Brno was supposed to be hosting the Czech's portion of the tournament, but couldn't host it due to time constraints with its construction. The replacement venue is the venue Brno Exhibition Centre, which recently hosted the 2025 Men's European Volleyball League final four and will have 5,000 temporary seats for the tournament.

2026 Women's European Volleyball Championship Pool B is located in Czech Republic	Brno
2026 Women's European Volleyball Championship Pool B is located in Czech Republic	Brno Exhibition Centre
2026 Women's European Volleyball Championship Pool B is located in Czech Republic	Capacity: 5,000

== Group standings ==
Pos	Team	Pld	W	L	Pts	SW	SL	SR	SPW	SPL	SPR	Qualification
1	Serbia	5	5	0	15	15	1	15.000	391	294	1.330	Final round
2	Czech Republic (H)	5	4	1	12	13	5	2.600	425	361	1.177	Final round
3	Greece	5	3	2	8	10	10	1.000	418	433	0.965	Final round
4	Bulgaria	5	2	3	5	7	11	0.636	381	401	0.950	Final round
5	Ukraine	5	1	4	4	6	12	0.500	392	389	1.008	
6	Austria	5	0	5	1	3	15	0.200	295	424	0.696	

Source: CEV
(H) Host

=== Group progression ===
The table listed the results of teams in each round.

Win	Loss

Team ╲ Round	1	2	3	4	5
Austria	L	L	L	L	L
Bulgaria	W	L	L	W	L
Czech Republic	W	W	L	W	W
Greece	L	W	W	W	L
Serbia	W	W	W	W	W
Ukraine	L	L	W	L	L

Source: CEV

=== Positions by round ===
The table listed the positions of teams in each round.

Advance to the knockout stage

Team ╲ Round	1	2	3	4	5
Austria	6	6	6	6	6
Bulgaria	2	5	5	4	4
Czech Republic	3	3	2	3	2
Greece	4	4	3	2	3
Serbia	1	1	1	1	1
Ukraine	5	5	4	5	5

Source: CEV

== Matches ==
- All times are Central European Summer Time (UTC+02:00).

=== Austria vs Serbia ===
21 August 2026; 14:00; Match duration: 1 hr 15 min	Austria	0–3	Serbia	Brno Exhibition Centre, Brno; Attendance: 1,542; Referees: Sonja Simonovska (MNE), Carlos Alberto Robles Garcia (ESP)
21 August 2026; 14:00; Match duration: 1 hr 15 min	(17–25, 9–25, 21–25); Report			Brno Exhibition Centre, Brno; Attendance: 1,542; Referees: Sonja Simonovska (MNE), Carlos Alberto Robles Garcia (ESP)
21 August 2026; 14:00; Match duration: 1 hr 15 min	Scoring leaders			Brno Exhibition Centre, Brno; Attendance: 1,542; Referees: Sonja Simonovska (MNE), Carlos Alberto Robles Garcia (ESP)
Galić 11		Total	Bošković 11
Galić (11/21)		Attack	Bošković (10/13)
Schaberl 3		Block	Popović 3
Raab (1/4)		Serve	five players 1

=== Bulgaria vs Ukraine ===
21 August 2026; 17:00; Match duration: 1 hr 25 min	Bulgaria	3–0	Ukraine	Brno Exhibition Centre, Brno; Attendance: 2,159; Referees: Vladimir Simonovic (SUI), Ágnes Bátkai-Katona (HUN)
21 August 2026; 17:00; Match duration: 1 hr 25 min	(25–23, 25–23, 25–20); Report			Brno Exhibition Centre, Brno; Attendance: 2,159; Referees: Vladimir Simonovic (SUI), Ágnes Bátkai-Katona (HUN)
21 August 2026; 17:00; Match duration: 1 hr 25 min	Scoring leaders			Brno Exhibition Centre, Brno; Attendance: 2,159; Referees: Vladimir Simonovic (SUI), Ágnes Bátkai-Katona (HUN)
Stojanova 14		Total	Artyshuk 9
Stojanova (10/33)		Attack	Artyshuk (8/23)
four players 2		Block	Meliushkyna, Milenko 2
Stojanova (3/14)		Serve	Sharhorodska (2/15)

=== Czech Republic vs Greece ===
21 August 2026; 20:00; Match duration: 1 hr 59 min	Czech Republic	3−1	Greece	Brno Exhibition Centre, Brno; Attendance: 3,576; Referees: Mathilde Hayaux Du Tilly (FRA), Sonja Simonovska (MNE)
21 August 2026; 20:00; Match duration: 1 hr 59 min	(25−14, 23−25, 25−15, 25−20); Report			Brno Exhibition Centre, Brno; Attendance: 3,576; Referees: Mathilde Hayaux Du Tilly (FRA), Sonja Simonovska (MNE)
21 August 2026; 20:00; Match duration: 1 hr 59 min	Scoring leaders			Brno Exhibition Centre, Brno; Attendance: 3,576; Referees: Mathilde Hayaux Du Tilly (FRA), Sonja Simonovska (MNE)
Brancuská 23		Total	Angelopoulou 17
Brancuská (22/49)		Attack	Anthouli (15/51)
Koulisiani 5		Block	six players 1
Rejmanová (2/4)		Serve	Angelopoulou (2/14)

=== Ukraine vs Greece ===
22 August 2026; 16:00; Match duration: 2 hr 10 min	Ukraine	2–3	Greece	Brno Exhibition Centre, Brno; Attendance: 2,018; Referees: Carlos Alberto Robles García (ESP), Mathilde Hayaux du Tilly (FRA)
22 August 2026; 16:00; Match duration: 2 hr 10 min	(23–25, 25–23, 25–12, 22–25, 10–15); Report			Brno Exhibition Centre, Brno; Attendance: 2,018; Referees: Carlos Alberto Robles García (ESP), Mathilde Hayaux du Tilly (FRA)
22 August 2026; 16:00; Match duration: 2 hr 10 min	Scoring leaders			Brno Exhibition Centre, Brno; Attendance: 2,018; Referees: Carlos Alberto Robles García (ESP), Mathilde Hayaux du Tilly (FRA)
Danchak 18		Total	Anthouli 28
Danchak (15/31)		Attack	Anthouli (24/58)
Dorsman 3		Block	Anthouli 2
Danchak, Milenko 3		Serve	Anthouli, Papageorgiou 2

=== Austria vs Czech Republic ===
22 August 2026; 19:00; Match duration: 1 hr 22 min	Austria	0–3	Czech Republic	Brno Exhibition Centre, Brno; Attendance: 3,726; Referees: Ágnes Bátkai-Katona (HUN), Vladimir Simonovic (SUI)
22 August 2026; 19:00; Match duration: 1 hr 22 min	(16–25, 17–25, 17–25); Report			Brno Exhibition Centre, Brno; Attendance: 3,726; Referees: Ágnes Bátkai-Katona (HUN), Vladimir Simonovic (SUI)
22 August 2026; 19:00; Match duration: 1 hr 22 min	Scoring leaders			Brno Exhibition Centre, Brno; Attendance: 3,726; Referees: Ágnes Bátkai-Katona (HUN), Vladimir Simonovic (SUI)
Schaberl 16		Total	Mlejnková 13
Schaberl (14/33)		Attack	Mlejnková (11/15)
three players 1		Block	Jehlářová 4
Hinteregger (2/6)		Serve	Šmídová (3/9)

=== Greece vs Bulgaria ===
23 August 2026; 16:00; Match duration: 1 hr 53 min	Greece	3–1	Bulgaria	Brno Exhibition Centre, Brno; Attendance: 3,459; Referees: Vladimir Simonovic (SUI), Carlos Alberto Robles Garcia (ESP)
23 August 2026; 16:00; Match duration: 1 hr 53 min	(25–20, 21–25, 25–18, 25–23); Report			Brno Exhibition Centre, Brno; Attendance: 3,459; Referees: Vladimir Simonovic (SUI), Carlos Alberto Robles Garcia (ESP)
23 August 2026; 16:00; Match duration: 1 hr 53 min	Scoring leaders			Brno Exhibition Centre, Brno; Attendance: 3,459; Referees: Vladimir Simonovic (SUI), Carlos Alberto Robles Garcia (ESP)
Anthouli 19		Total	Dudova 23
Bakodimou (16/32)		Attack	Dudova (18/40)
Papageorgiou 7		Block	Dudova 2
Tikmanidou (3/20)		Serve	Ilieva (3/15)

=== Czech Republic vs Serbia ===
23 August 2026; 19:00; Match duration: 1 hr 51 min	Czech Republic	1–3	Serbia	Brno Exhibition Centre, Brno; Attendance: 5,021; Referees: Sonja Simonovska (MNE), Ágnes Bátkai-Katona (HUN)
23 August 2026; 19:00; Match duration: 1 hr 51 min	(19–25, 17–25, 25–16, 17–25); Report			Brno Exhibition Centre, Brno; Attendance: 5,021; Referees: Sonja Simonovska (MNE), Ágnes Bátkai-Katona (HUN)
23 August 2026; 19:00; Match duration: 1 hr 51 min	Scoring leaders			Brno Exhibition Centre, Brno; Attendance: 5,021; Referees: Sonja Simonovska (MNE), Ágnes Bátkai-Katona (HUN)
Mlejnková 17		Total	Bošković 27
Mlejnková (16/38)		Attack	Bošković (24/45)
Jehlářová, Koulisiani 2		Block	Tica 3
Koulisiani (2/14)		Serve	three players 1

=== Ukraine vs Austria ===
24 August 2026; 16:00; Match duration: 1 hr 10 min	Ukraine	3–0	Austria	Brno Exhibition Centre, Brno; Attendance: 352; Referees: Mathilde Hayaux Du Tilly (FRA), Vladimir Simonovic (SUI)
24 August 2026; 16:00; Match duration: 1 hr 10 min	(25–15, 25–16, 25–12); Report			Brno Exhibition Centre, Brno; Attendance: 352; Referees: Mathilde Hayaux Du Tilly (FRA), Vladimir Simonovic (SUI)
24 August 2026; 16:00; Match duration: 1 hr 10 min	Scoring leaders			Brno Exhibition Centre, Brno; Attendance: 352; Referees: Mathilde Hayaux Du Tilly (FRA), Vladimir Simonovic (SUI)
Artyshuk 21		Total	Schaberl 9
Artyshuk (14/28)		Attack	Galić (7/16)
Artyshuk, Meliushkyna 4		Block	Schaberl 2
Artyshuk (3/13)		Serve	Schaberl (1/7)

=== Serbia vs Bulgaria ===
24 August 2026; 19:00; Match duration: 1 hr 12 min	Serbia	3–0	Bulgaria	Brno Exhibition Centre, Brno; Attendance: 457; Referees: Carlos Alberto Robles (ESP), Sonja Simonovska (MNE)
24 August 2026; 19:00; Match duration: 1 hr 12 min	(25–18, 25–14, 25–20); Report			Brno Exhibition Centre, Brno; Attendance: 457; Referees: Carlos Alberto Robles (ESP), Sonja Simonovska (MNE)
24 August 2026; 19:00; Match duration: 1 hr 12 min	Scoring leaders			Brno Exhibition Centre, Brno; Attendance: 457; Referees: Carlos Alberto Robles (ESP), Sonja Simonovska (MNE)
Uzelac 18		Total	Dudova 12
Uzelac (15/31)		Attack	Dudova (10/30)
Kurtagić 7		Block	Dudova 2
four players 1		Serve	Ilieva (2/9)

=== Greece vs Austria ===
25 August 2026; 16:00; Match duration: 1 hr 40 min	Greece	3–1	Austria	Brno Exhibition Centre, Brno; Attendance: 1,485; Referees: Ágnes Bátkai-Katona (HUN), Mathilde Hayaux Du Tilly (FRA)
25 August 2026; 16:00; Match duration: 1 hr 40 min	(20–25, 25–18, 25–12, 25–14); Report			Brno Exhibition Centre, Brno; Attendance: 1,485; Referees: Ágnes Bátkai-Katona (HUN), Mathilde Hayaux Du Tilly (FRA)
25 August 2026; 16:00; Match duration: 1 hr 40 min	Scoring leaders			Brno Exhibition Centre, Brno; Attendance: 1,485; Referees: Ágnes Bátkai-Katona (HUN), Mathilde Hayaux Du Tilly (FRA)
Anthouli 20		Total	Schaberl 14
Anthouli (16/35)		Attack	Schaberl (10/36)
Chatziefstratiadou 3		Block	three players 2
Anthouli (4/22)		Serve	three players 2

=== Czech Republic vs Ukraine ===
25 August 2026; 19:00; Match duration: 1 hr 50 min	Czech Republic	3–1	Ukraine	Brno Exhibition Centre, Brno; Attendance: 3,121; Referees: Sonja Simonovska (MNE), Carlos Alberto Robles Garcia (ESP)
25 August 2026; 19:00; Match duration: 1 hr 50 min	(25–17, 21–25, 25–19, 25–21); Report			Brno Exhibition Centre, Brno; Attendance: 3,121; Referees: Sonja Simonovska (MNE), Carlos Alberto Robles Garcia (ESP)
25 August 2026; 19:00; Match duration: 1 hr 50 min	Scoring leaders			Brno Exhibition Centre, Brno; Attendance: 3,121; Referees: Sonja Simonovska (MNE), Carlos Alberto Robles Garcia (ESP)
Brancuská 21		Total	Artyshuk 18
Brancuská (20/43)		Attack	Milenko (16/42)
Jehlářová, Koulisiani 5		Block	Dorsman, Meliushkyna 4
Šmídová (3/23)		Serve	three players 1

=== Austria vs Bulgaria ===
26 August 2026; 16:00; Match duration: 1 hr 58 min	Austria	2–3	Bulgaria	Brno Exhibition Centre, Brno; Attendance: 312; Referees: Mathilde Hayaux Du Tilly (FRA), Vlastimil Kovar (CZE)
26 August 2026; 16:00; Match duration: 1 hr 58 min	(26–24, 25–15, 15–25, 16–25, 4–15); Report			Brno Exhibition Centre, Brno; Attendance: 312; Referees: Mathilde Hayaux Du Tilly (FRA), Vlastimil Kovar (CZE)
26 August 2026; 16:00; Match duration: 1 hr 58 min	Scoring leaders			Brno Exhibition Centre, Brno; Attendance: 312; Referees: Mathilde Hayaux Du Tilly (FRA), Vlastimil Kovar (CZE)
Schaberl 26		Total	Dudova 23
Schaberl (22/38)		Attack	Dudova (19/41)
four players 2		Block	Dudova, Krivoshiiska 3
Schaberl (2/10)		Serve	Krivoshiiska, Milanova 3

=== Serbia vs Greece ===
26 August 2026; 19:00; Match duration: 1 hr 12 min	Serbia	3–0	Greece	Brno Exhibition Centre, Brno; Attendance: 415; Referees: Ágnes Bátkai-Katona (HUN), Carlos Alberto Robles Garcia (ESP)
26 August 2026; 19:00; Match duration: 1 hr 12 min	(25–22, 25–13, 25–18); Report			Brno Exhibition Centre, Brno; Attendance: 415; Referees: Ágnes Bátkai-Katona (HUN), Carlos Alberto Robles Garcia (ESP)
26 August 2026; 19:00; Match duration: 1 hr 12 min	Scoring leaders			Brno Exhibition Centre, Brno; Attendance: 415; Referees: Ágnes Bátkai-Katona (HUN), Carlos Alberto Robles Garcia (ESP)
Bošković 20		Total	Anthouli 12
Bošković (17/31)		Attack	Bakodimou (9/29)
Kurtagić 7		Block	Anthouli 3
Bošković, Ognjenović 2		Serve	Tikmanidou (1/5)

=== Ukraine vs Serbia ===
27 August 2026; 16:00; Match duration: 1 hr 20 min	Ukraine	0–3	Serbia	Brno Exhibition Centre, Brno; Attendance: 2,622; Referees: Vlastimil Kovar (CZE), Ágnes Bátkai-Katona (HUN)
27 August 2026; 16:00; Match duration: 1 hr 20 min	(21–25, 22–25, 21–25); Report			Brno Exhibition Centre, Brno; Attendance: 2,622; Referees: Vlastimil Kovar (CZE), Ágnes Bátkai-Katona (HUN)
27 August 2026; 16:00; Match duration: 1 hr 20 min	Scoring leaders			Brno Exhibition Centre, Brno; Attendance: 2,622; Referees: Vlastimil Kovar (CZE), Ágnes Bátkai-Katona (HUN)
Milenko 18		Total	Uzelac 22
Milenko (14/31)		Attack	Uzelac (17/47)
Dorsman 3		Block	Kurtagić, Popović 4
Milenko (3/15)		Serve	Ognjenović, Uzelac 2

=== Czech Republic vs Bulgaria ===
27 August 2026; 19:00; Match duration: 1 hr 25 min	Czech Republic	3–0	Bulgaria	Brno Exhibition Centre, Brno; Attendance: 4,725; Referees: Carlos Alberto Robles Garcia (ESP), Sonja Simonovska (MNE)
27 August 2026; 19:00; Match duration: 1 hr 25 min	(28–26, 25–19, 25–19); Report			Brno Exhibition Centre, Brno; Attendance: 4,725; Referees: Carlos Alberto Robles Garcia (ESP), Sonja Simonovska (MNE)
27 August 2026; 19:00; Match duration: 1 hr 25 min	Scoring leaders			Brno Exhibition Centre, Brno; Attendance: 4,725; Referees: Carlos Alberto Robles Garcia (ESP), Sonja Simonovska (MNE)
Brancuská 12		Total	Milanova 15
Brancuská (12/24)		Attack	Milanova (15/40)
Jehlářová 4		Block	Kolarova 2
		Serve	Krasteva (1/8)
