= Animefest =

Anime convention in Czech Republic

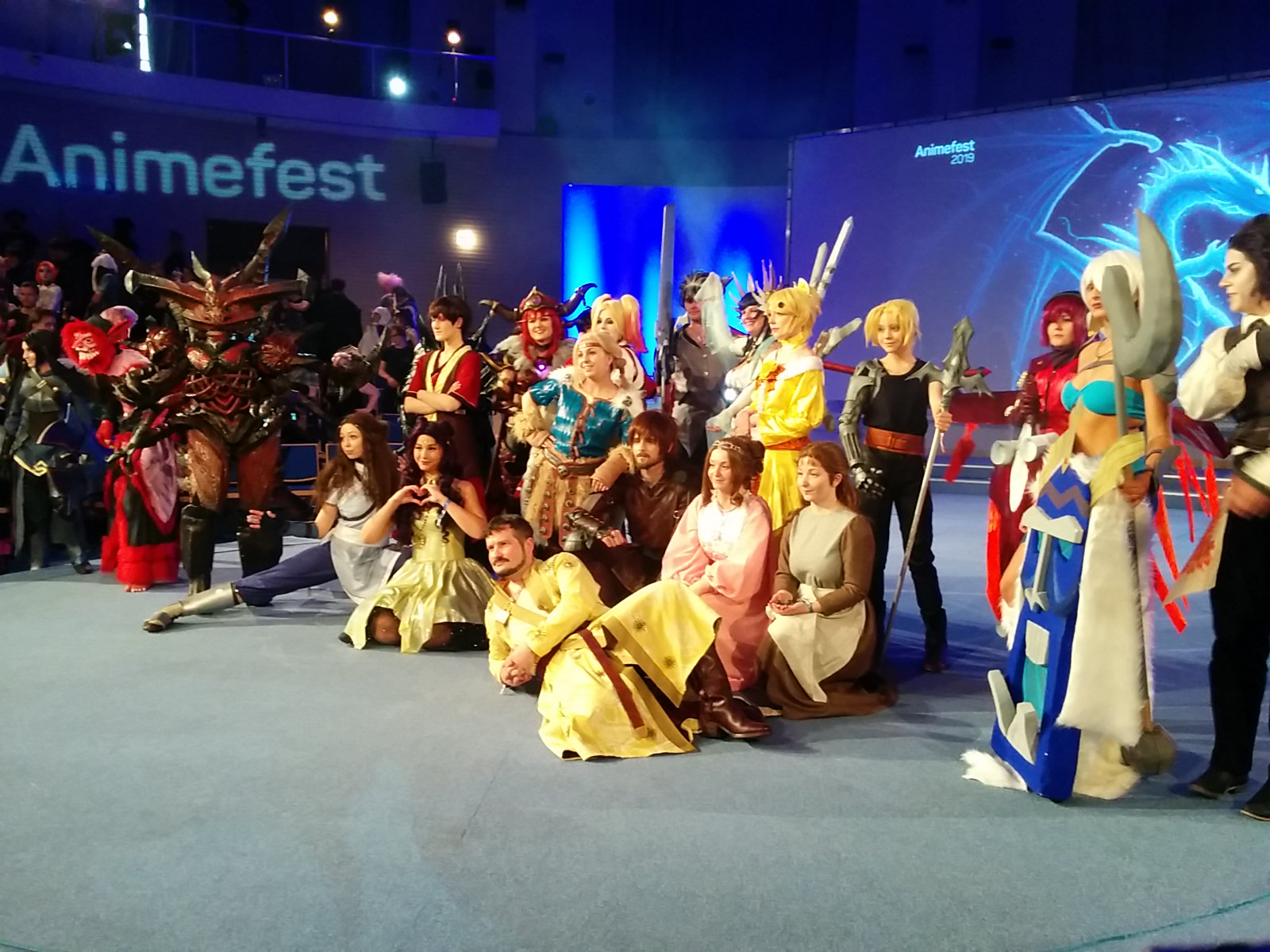
- Cosplay competition in 2019
- Status: Active
- Location: Brno
- Country: The Czech Republic
- Inaugurated: 2004
- Attendance: 7,200 in 2019
- Website: http://www.animefest.cz/

Animefest is the oldest anime convention in the Czech Republic, Europe.

Animefest was held for the first time in 2004. It was and still is organised by Brněnští Otaku (translated as Brno otaku), at first a free group of otaku. As time went by, the convention became too large and for better organisation, a civic association Brněnští Otaku was founded in 2007. Animefest is one of the two largest conventions held in the Czech Republic, having around the same number of visitors as Advík, which is held in Prague, in July. Animefest holds Anime Music Video competition, the main prize of it being a plush doll of Totoro. This competition is held yearly since the first year of Animefest and because of that it is considered the main event of the year for most of Czech AMV creators. From 2010 to 2016, cosplay contest at Animefest is part of EuroCosplay event. Since 2017, group cosplay contest is qualifier for Clara Cow's Cosplay Cup. Since 2018, Animefest cosplay contest is part of European Cosplay Gathering (Extreme Cosplay Gathering). Since 2024, Animefest cosplay contest is part of World Cosplay Summit. Animefest is the official selection for the Czech Republic for the European K-Pop dance contest, an international event organized by Comicon and hosted by Etna Comics, in Italy.

== History ==
Date	Location	Visitors	Guests
8–9 May 2004	Art cinema Brno, The Czech Republic	± 250	-
7–8 May 2005	Art cinema Brno, The Czech Republic	± 350	-
6–7 May 2006	Art cinema Brno, The Czech Republic	± 450	-
5–6 May 2007	Art cinema, Scala cinema Brno, The Czech Republic	± 800	-
10–11 May 2008	Scala cinema, B. Bakala hall Brno, The Czech Republic	± 1000	-
8–10 May 2009	Scala cinema, B. Bakala hall, hotel International conference centre Brno, The Czech Republic	± 1200	-
7–9 May 2010	Scala cinema, B. Bakala hall, hotel Continental; Brno, The Czech Republic	± 1300	Yuji Nunokawa and Kunihiko Ryo
6–8 May 2011	Scala cinema, B. Bakala hall, hotel Continental; Brno, The Czech Republic	± 1600	-
4–6 May 2012	Brno Exhibition Centre; Brno, The Czech Republic	± 2000	Jonathan Clements
10–12 May 2013	Brno Exhibition Centre; Brno, The Czech Republic	± 2500	Toshiyuki Kubooka, Eiji Matsuo
9–11 May 2014	Brno Exhibition Centre; Brno, The Czech Republic	± 3300	Jonathan Clements, Vlad G Pohnert
1–3 May 2015	Brno Exhibition Centre; Brno, The Czech Republic	± 3700	Shappi
29 April–1 May 2016	Brno Exhibition Centre; Brno, The Czech Republic	± 4300	Andrew Osmond, Sycra Yasin, Nsio
19–21 May 2017	Brno Exhibition Centre; Brno, The Czech Republic	± 5500	
18–20 May 2018	Brno Exhibition Centre; Brno, The Czech Republic	± 6000	Reika Arikawa, Natalia Batista
24–26 May 2019	Brno Exhibition Centre; Brno, The Czech Republic	± 7200	Tetsuro Shimaguchi, Maul Cosplay, Hellyon White
20-22 May 2022	Brno Exhibition Centre; Brno, The Czech Republic	± 8500	
5-7 May 2023	Brno Exhibition Centre; Brno, The Czech Republic	± 11500	Mika Kobayashi, Tetsuro Shimaguchi, Yaya Han, Fenix Fatalist
24-26 May 2024	Brno Exhibition Centre; Brno, The Czech Republic	± 13800	Tetsuro Shimaguchi, Taryn, Yaya Han, Kei LaVonne
23-25 May 2025	Brno Exhibition Centre; Brno, The Czech Republic	± 14600	Atelier Pierrot, Karla Diaz, Mion, Nana Kitade, Seven Oops
22-24 May 2026	Brno Exhibition Centre; Brno, The Czech Republic	± 16000	Rolling Quartz, ASH DA HERO, Ironmouse
21-23 May 2027	Brno Exhibition Centre; Brno, The Czech Republic		

Due to regulations related to COVID-19 pandemic, 2020 and 2021 edition of Animefest had to be cancelled.
