= HN R200 =

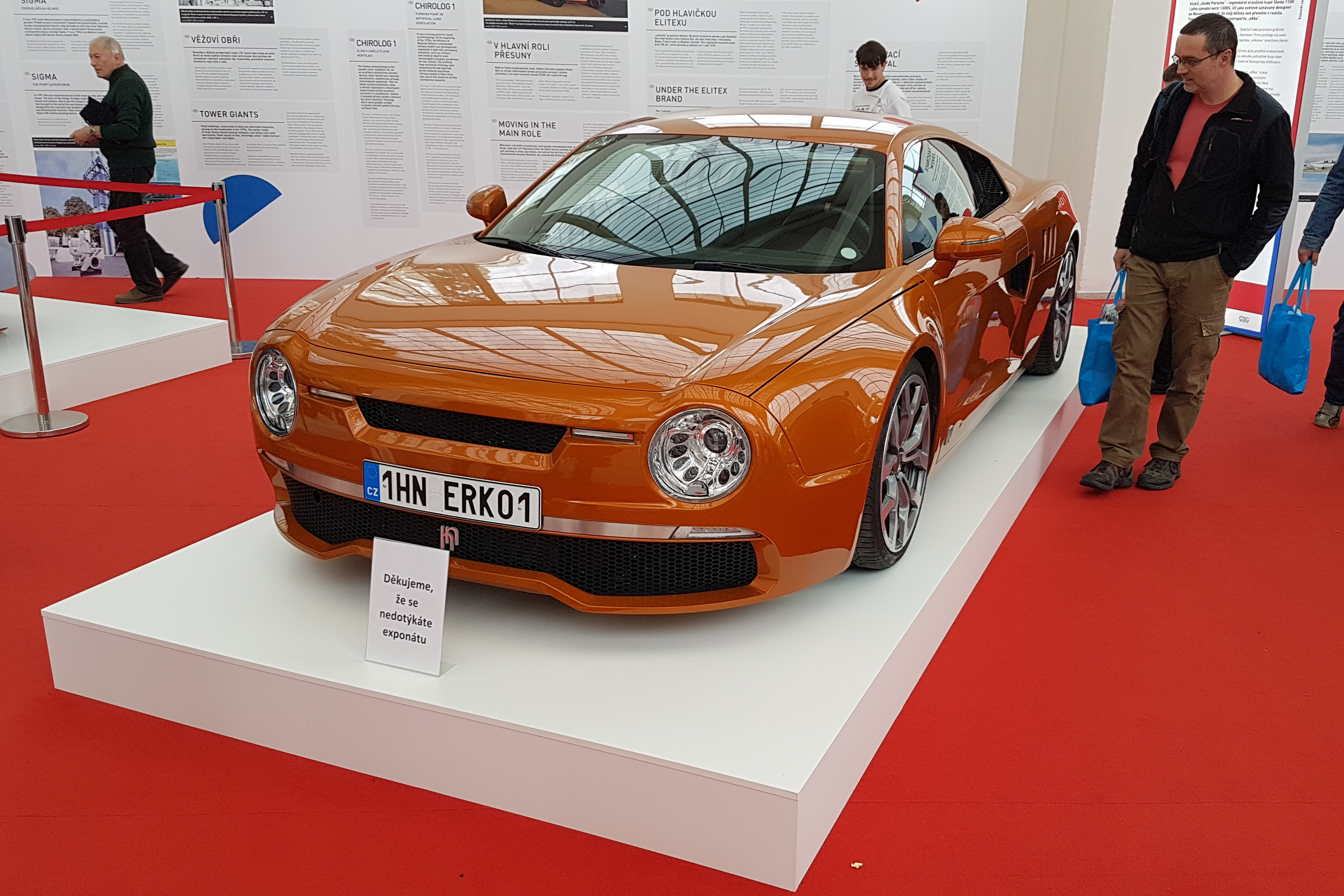
- Orange prototype at the 100RIES exhibition at MSV 2018 at the Brno Exhibition Centre

Overview
- Manufacturer: Hoffman&Novague
- Production: 2016-present

Body and chassis
- Class: Sports car (S)
- Related: Audi R8

Powertrain
- Engine: 4.2L V8
- Power output: 316 kW (430 PS)
- Transmission: 6-speed manual

Dimensions
- Length: 4400mm
- Width: 2000mm
- Height: 1300mm
- Curb weight: 1650kg

The HN R200 is a Czech supercar designed by Hoffman&Novague in 2015, intended as a tribute to the Škoda 130 RS. Only three examples were produced, in orange, dark blue and light blue.

== History ==
The development of the car took approximately two and a half years, obtaining homologation another year. Introduced in April 2015, the concept was originally called the R200 non-fiction. It was based on the first generation Audi R8 and received a new body referencing the famous Škoda 110R. The final form under the name HN R200 received homologation for roads in October 2016. At the time, there was talk of producing up to 30 examples. By the summer of 2019, 3 pieces were produced. All three cars produced are on display at the Veterans Museum, which is part of the Kovozoo in the Old Town, Prague.

== Description ==
The car is made by modifying a first generation, manual transmission Audi R8. The design of the base car also determined the shape of the HN R200 . The chassis, eight-cylinder rear engine and window are preserved from the original Audi R8. The bodywork is mainly aluminium, supplemented with carbon fibre composite elements. The headlights come from Bentley, and most of the other components used in the build are also from Volkswagen. The car's maximum power is 316 kW (430 PS), it can reach a maximum speed of 280 km/h (174 mph), and accelerates from 0 to 100 km/h in 4.5 seconds. The car was sold at the time of launch in October 2016 at a price of CZK 4.2 million.
