= Charikleia =

Charikleia (Greek: Χαρίκλεια), also romanized as Kharikleia or Harikleia, is a given name of Greek origin. Notable people with this name include:

- Charikleia Bouda (born 1980), Greek sprinter
- Charikleia Kastritsi (born 1983), Greek weightlifter
- Charikleia Pantazi (born 1985), Greek rhythmic gymnast
- Charikleia Sakkoula (born 1973), Greek volleyball player
