= Volleyball at the 2005 Mediterranean Games – Women's tournament =

Women's Volleyball at the 2005 Mediterranean Games

Medalists
gold medal	Turkey
silver medal	Greece
bronze medal	Italy

The Women's Volleyball tournament at the 2005 Mediterranean Games was held in Almería, Spain.

== Teams ==
Group A

- Albania
- Greece
- Spain
- Turkey

Group B

- Croatia
- France
- Italy

== Preliminary round ==
=== Group A ===
	Team	Points	G	W	L	PW	PL	Ratio	SW	SL	Ratio
1.	Turkey	6	3	3	0	263	204	1.289	9	2	4.500
2.	Greece	5	3	2	1	251	240	1.046	6	5	1.200
3.	Spain	4	3	1	2	282	275	1.025	6	7	0.857
4.	Albania	3	3	0	3	193	270	0.715	2	9	0.222

- Saturday June 25, 2005

Turkey	3 – 0	Greece	25–20 26–24 25–17
Spain	3 – 1	Albania	25–16 24–26 25–16 25–11

- Monday June 27, 2005

Turkey	3 – 0	Albania	25-09 25–15 25–20
Spain	1 – 3	Greece	25–19 19–25 23–25 17–25

- Wednesday June 29, 2005

Greece	3 – 1	Albania	25–18 25–19 21–25 25–18
Spain	2 – 3	Turkey	26–24 20–25 25–23 18–25 10–15

=== Group B ===
	Team	Points	G	W	L	PW	PL	Ratio	SW	SL	Ratio
1.	Italy	4	2	2	0	152	104	1.462	6	0	6.000
2.	Croatia	2	2	1	1	126	134	0.940	3	3	1.000
3.	France	2	2	0	2	111	151	0.735	0	6	0.000

- Saturday June 25, 2005

France	0 – 3	Croatia	15–25 20–25 23–25

- Monday June 27, 2005

Italy	3 – 0	Croatia	25–15 26–24 25–12

- Wednesday June 29, 2005

Italy	3 – 0	France	26–24 25–12 25–17

=== Final round ===
Semi-finals
Italy	1
Greece	3
Turkey	3
Croatia	0

Final
Greece	0
Turkey	3
Third place
Italy	3
Croatia	1

==== Semi finals ====
- Friday July 1, 2005

Italy	1 – 3	Greece	13–25 25–22 18–25 16–25
Turkey	3 – 0	Croatia	25–19 25–16 25–18

==== Finals ====
- Friday July 1, 2005 — Classification Match (5th/6th place)

Spain	3 – 1	France	22–25 26–24 25–19 25–19

- Saturday July 2, 2005 — Classification Match (Bronze-medal match)

Italy	3 – 1	Croatia	25–20 31–33 25–20 25–18

- Saturday July 2, 2005 — Classification Match (Gold-medal match)

Greece	0 – 3	Turkey	22–25 22–25 22–25

=== Final ranking ===
RANK	TEAM
	Turkey
	Greece
	Italy
4.	Croatia
5.	Spain
6.	France
7.	Albania

=== Awards ===
2005 Women's Mediterranean Games champions

Turkey

=== See also ===
- 2005 Women's European Volleyball Championship
