= Vasiliki Papazoglou =

Greek volleyball player (born 1979)

Personal information
- Nationality: Greek
- Born: 24 August 1979 (age 47)
- Height: 1.85 m (6 ft 1 in)
- Weight: 83 kg (183 lb)
- Spike: 299 cm (118 in)
- Block: 292 cm (115 in)

Volleyball information
- Number: 11

Career
- Years: Team
- 2004: (Greece) Panellinios

National team
- Years: Team
- 2004: Greece Greece

Vasiliki Papazoglou (born 24 August 1979) is a Greek female volleyball player. She was part of the Greece women's national volleyball team.

She competed with the national team at the 2004 Summer Olympics in Athens, Greece. She played with Panellinios in 2004.

== Clubs ==
- (Greece) Panellinios (2004)

== See also ==
- Greece at the 2004 Summer Olympics
