= Sofia Iordanidou =

Greek volleyball player (born 1974)

Personal information
- Nationality: Greek
- Born: 3 May 1974 (age 52)
- Height: 1.91 m (6 ft 3 in)
- Weight: 79 kg (174 lb)
- Spike: 304 cm (120 in)
- Block: 297 cm (117 in)

Volleyball information
- Number: 14

Career
Years	Teams
2004	(Greece) OFA Apollonios

National team
2004	Greece Greece

Sofia Iordanidou (born 3 May 1974) was a Greek female volleyball player. She was part of the Greece women's national volleyball team.

She competed with the national team at the 2004 Summer Olympics in Athens, Greece. She played with OFA Apollonios in 2004.

== Clubs ==
- (Greece) OFA Apollonios (2004)

== See also ==
- Greece at the 2004 Summer Olympics
