= Melisa Cenović =

Montenegrin volleyball player (born 1998)

Personal information
- Nationality: Montenegro
- Born: 24 August 1998 (age 28)
- Height: 1.70 m (5 ft 7 in)
- Weight: 60 kg (132 lb)

Volleyball information
- Position: Libero
- Current club: (Montenegro) OK Herceg Novi
- Number: 4

National team
- Years: Team
- 2015–present: Montenegro
- Updated on November 2026

Melisa Cenović (born 24 August 1998) is a Montenegrin professional volleyball player who plays as a libero. She plays for OK Herceg Novi in the Montenegrin domestic league and for the Montenegrin national team, which she has also captained. She began her senior career with ŽOK Luka Bar and later played abroad for CSO Voluntari 2005 in Romania and OK Marina Kaštela in Croatia.

According to the CEV, she is the most decorated player in the Montenegrin squad, with 13 domestic league titles. She was named best female player of the Montenegrin domestic league for 2024 by the Volleyball Federation of Montenegro (OSCG). Cenović has played for Montenegro since her teens, first in youth competitions and then in the senior team's CEV European League, Silver League, Golden League and European Championship qualification tournaments. In 2026 she was part of the squad that made Montenegro's first appearance at the CEV EuroVolley.

== Club career ==
=== Luka Bar (2012–2021) ===
Cenović began her senior career with ŽOK Luka Bar, the club based in Bar, and played for it in the CEV European Cups in 2013, 2017 and 2020. Volleybox lists her time at the club as 2012/13 to 2020/21.

=== Abroad (2021–2023) ===
In 2021 she moved to Romania to play for CSO Voluntari 2005, and in 2022 she played for OK Marina Kaštela in Croatia. While in Croatia she was among the nominees for the OSCG award for best Montenegrin female player competing abroad.

=== OK Herceg Novi (2023–present) ===
Cenović joined OK Herceg Novi, with whom she won the Montenegrin Cup and the EPCG Superleague in the same season. In the OSCG's 2023 vote for best domestic female player she was among the leading candidates, behind Tatjana Bokan. In 2024 she won the award herself, receiving 13 votes. As team captain, she received the finalist's plaque when Herceg Novi lost the Montenegrin Super Cup final 3–1 to Luka Bar, who claimed the title for the first time. According to the CEV, she has won 13 domestic league titles in total.

== National team ==
Cenović represented Montenegro at youth level in the 2013 CEV Youth European Championship, the 2014 U19/U20 European Championship and the 2015 U18/U19 European Championship. She first appears in Montenegro's senior squad lists in 2015, and has since been a regular in the team's CEV competitions, including the European League (2016, 2017, 2026), the European Silver League (2023, 2024), the European Golden League (2025) and qualification for the European Championship. She has served as captain of the senior team.

=== EuroVolley 2026 ===
Cenović was part of the Montenegrin squad at CEV EuroVolley 2026, the first time the national team qualified for the European Championship. Almost all of the squad's players compete in the Montenegrin domestic league, where matches are mostly played in local sports halls. The opening match against Sweden in Gothenburg drew a record crowd of 5,261 spectators. Speaking to the CEV, Cenović described the journey from small local sports halls to the 8,000-seat Scandinavium as a long one, and contrasted the professional organisation of the tournament with conditions in the Montenegrin domestic league.

== Clubs ==
- (Montenegro) ŽOK Luka Bar (2012–2021)
- (Romania) CSO Voluntari 2005 (2021–2022)
- (Croatia) OK Marina Kaštela (2022)
- (Montenegro) OK Herceg Novi (2023–present)

== Awards ==
=== Individuals ===
- Montenegrin Superliga MVP: 2018–19, 2024–25, 2025–26
- 2024 Best female player of the Montenegrin domestic league (OSCG)

=== Clubs ===
- Montenegrin Women's Volleyball League - Champion (13 titles)
- Montenegrin Cup and EPCG Superleague double, with OK Herceg Novi

=== National team ===
- Games of the Small States of Europe 2015 and 2019
