= Gladys Ekaru =

Kenyan volleyball player

Personal information
- Full name: Gladys Ekaru Emaniman
- Born: 2 October 1999 (age 27) Trans Nzoia, Kenya
- Height: 1.92 m (6 ft 4 in)
- Weight: 70 kg (154 lb)
- Spike: 292 cm (115 in)
- Block: 282 cm (111 in)

Volleyball information
- Number: 12

Career
- Years: Team
- –: Kenya Pipeline

National team
- Years: Team
- –: Kenya

Gladys Ekaru Emaniman (born 2 October 1999) is a Kenyan volleyball player. She is part of the Kenya women's national volleyball team.

== Life ==
She was born in Trans-Nzoia County in 1999. The event that shaped her career was when a friend persuaded her to get her parents to allow her to change schools. Ekaru was tall and a 400-metre runner and her friend knew she would be good at volleyball. She changed schools to attend Kwanthanze Secondary School in Machakos County. Her parents were extra pleased when the school agreed to cover her costs with a scholarship. The school had a reputation for volleyball and in 2018 the national team took five players from the school.

Ekaru found volleyball demanding and she decided to give it up. Luckily a school and teammate Sharon Chepchumba and the school's coach Justine Kigwari helped her. Kigwari and the school also created the volleyball professionals Pamela Masaisai and Sharon ChepChumba.

In 2019 she joined the Malkia Strikers (the national squad) with Jemimma Siangu and Ruth Mutinga in preparation for the 2019 African Games under the coach Japheth Munala. She got to play with her hero Triza Atuka.

She made her international debut in Cairo.

She was chosen to represent Kenya at the 2020 Summer Olympics by coach Paul Bitok. The team set off from Kenya for the Olympics in Tokyo in three batches to try and minimise the chances of being effected by the COVID-19 pandemic. Within their group the Kenyan team will first play the home team of Japan on 25 July and then at two day intervals the team will play South Korea, Serbia, the Dominican Republic and then Brazil on 2 August 2021.
