= Charikleia Sakkoula =

Greek volleyball player (born 1973)

Personal information
- Nationality: Greek
- Born: 18 December 1973 (age 52)
- Height: 1.80 m (5 ft 11 in)
- Weight: 65 kg (143 lb)
- Spike: 193 cm (76 in)
- Block: 287 cm (113 in)

Volleyball information
- Number: 8

Career
Years	Teams
2004	(Greece) Panathinaikos

National team
2004	Greece Greece

Charikleia Sakkoula (born 18 December 1973) was a Greek female volleyball player. She was part of the Greece women's national volleyball team.

She competed with the national team at the 2004 Summer Olympics in Athens, Greece. She played with Panathinaikos in 2004.

== Clubs ==
- (Greece) Panathinaikos (2004)

== See also ==
- Greece at the 2004 Summer Olympics
