= Evangelia Tani =

Greek volleyball player

Personal information
- Full name: Evangelia Tani
- Nationality: Greece
- Born: July 22, 2004 (age 22) Greece
- Height: 1.83 m (6 ft 0 in)
- Weight: 64 kg (141 lb)
- Spike: 267 cm (105 in)
- Block: 236 cm (93 in)

Volleyball information
- Position: Setter
- Current club: PAOK
- Number: 4

Career
- Years: Team
- 2019–2023: (Greece) Aris
- 2023–2024: (Greece) Olympiacos
- 2024–: (Greece) Panathinaikos

National team
- Years: Team
- 2023–: Greece

Evangelia Tani (Greek: Ευαγγελία Τάνη; born July 22, 2004) is a Greek female professional volleyball player who plays as a setter. She is a basic member of the Greece women's national volleyball team and plays for PAOK.

== Career with teams ==
Tani began her senior club career with Aris, where she spent four consecutive seasons in the Greek Women's Volleyball League. In June 2022, Aris announced the renewal of her contract for a fourth consecutive season. During the 2021–22 season, she was named MVP of the 21st round of the Greek Women's Volleyball League.

She represented Aris in European competition during the 2022–23 CEV Women's Challenge Cup.

In 2023, Tani joined Olympiacos and played in European competition during the 2023–24 season. She subsequently moved to Panathinaikos.

During the 2025–26 Greek Women's Volleyball League season, Tani appeared for Panathinaikos and was ranked among the league's leading setters, recording a 40.60% setter efficiency in the matches she played. In August 2026, it was announced that she transferred to the Thessaloniki team, PAOK.

== Career with the Greek national team ==
Tani represented Greece at youth level from the late 2010s. She was part of Greece's U17/U18 national-team cycle at the 2020 Girls' U17 European Volleyball Championship and had previously competed in the 2019 CEV U16/U17 European Championship cycle. In April 2022, she was part of the Greece women's U19 squad during qualification for the 2022 Women's U19 European Volleyball Championship. In Greece's 3–0 victory over Latvia, Tani scored five service aces, contributing to Greece's strong start in the qualifying tournament.

Tani was included in the Greece senior women's national team during the 2023 season. In June 2023, she participated in the senior team's preparation and friendly matches against Egypt.

She represented Greece at the 2023 Women's European Volleyball Championship, the 2025 Women's European Volleyball Golden League, and the 2026 Women's European Volleyball Championship. She also played for Greece in the CEV Volleyball European League.

At the 2026 Women's European Volleyball Championship, although started as reserve setter, Tani finally played a key role as Greece's starting setter.

== Awards ==
=== Club ===
- Greek Women's Volleyball League: 2021–22 – 21st round MVP, with Aris
