= Georgina Antonakaki =

Greek volleyball player

Personal information
- Full name: Georgia Maria Antonakaki
- Nationality: Greece
- Born: September 16, 2002 (age 24) Athens
- Height: 1.75 m (5 ft 9 in)

Volleyball information
- Position: Middle blocker
- Current club: Panathinaikos

National team
- Years: Team
- 2026–: Greece

Georgina Antonakaki (born 16 September 2002) is a Greek volleyball player who plays as a libero for Panathinaikos and the Greece women's national volleyball team.

She has played for several Greek clubs, including Olympiacos, AO Markopoulou, and in 2025, at Panathinaikos. She made her senior debut for Greece in 2025 and was part of the national team at the 2026 Women's European Volleyball Championship, held in Brno.
