= Veronica Oluoch =

Kenyan volleyball player

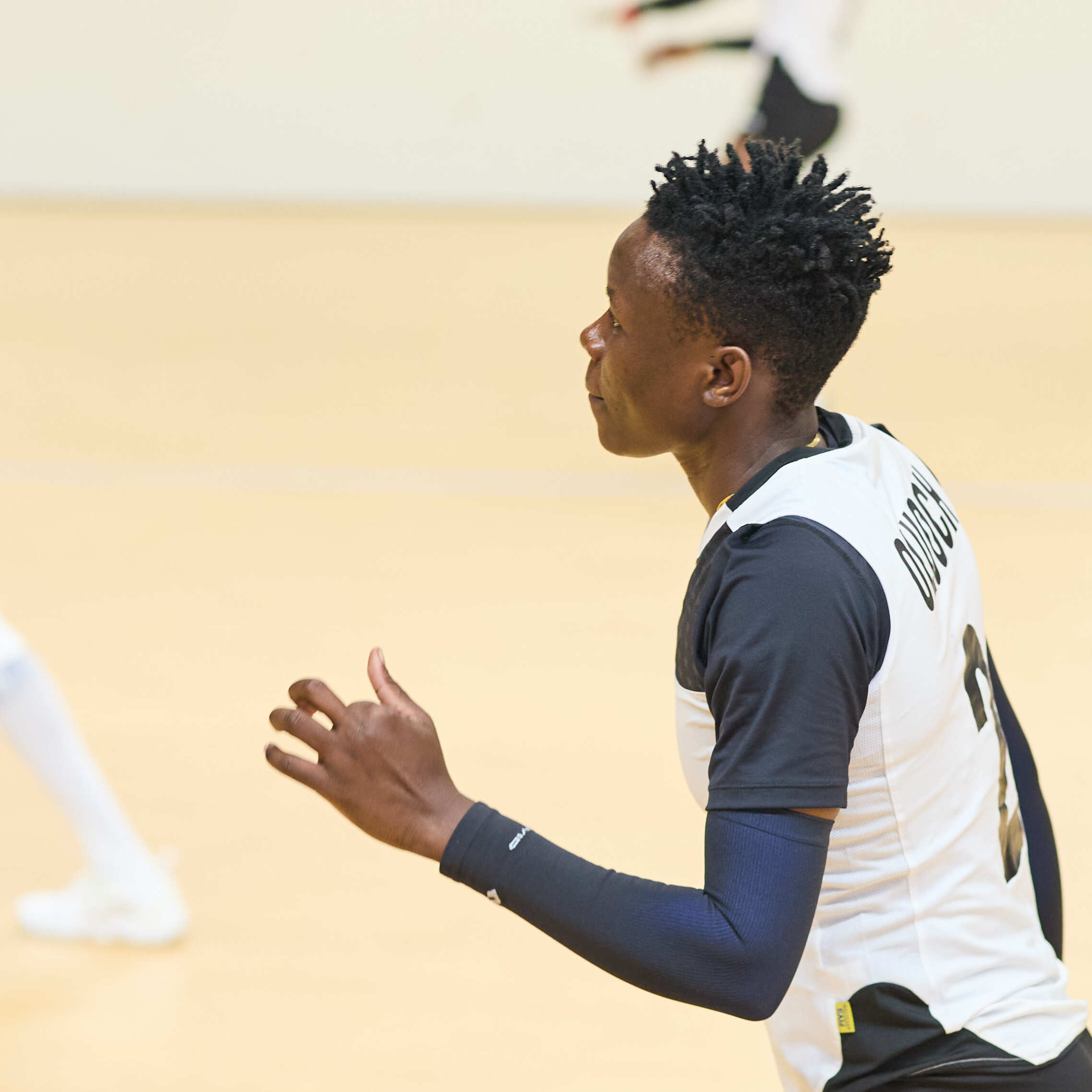
- in 2023 at the Africa Games
- Born: Veronica Adhiambo Oluoch; 5 June 1999 (age 27)
- Occupation: volleyball player

Veronica Adhiambo Oluoch (born 5 June 1999) is a Kenyan volleyball player who plays on the Kenyan team including at the 2024 Olympics.

== Life ==
Oluoch was born in 1999.

She attended Kamrembo Siwandhe Primary School in Siaya County where she discovered her talent for sport and it is where she decided to ignore football so that she could specialise in volleyball.

She joined the Directorate of Criminal Investigation team and she was offered a job as a police officer but she preferred to play volleyball. The COVID-19 pandemic created a pause in her career but she kept herself fit. She only played one match in 2020, but she was spotted there. Oluoch played for the leading Kenyan team of Kenya Prisons from October 2021 for a year.

In March 2022 she was paired with Naomi Too for the Commonwealth Games qualifiers in Accra, Ghana. They took the bronze medal but missed out on a place at the games. In 2022 she was also at the Kenya Women's World Championship 2022. In October of that year she was signed up by the Turkish team Tarsus Belediyesi. She had a challenge on the team as not many of the team spoke English. She managed by using her phone to translate phrases in to Turkish or by using the services of the one player who could speak both Turkish and English. She had to use these methods to talk to the team's coach. She found out that in Turkey the teams always played indoors where as in Kenya they would practice outside because of financial constraints.

She was chosen to be on Kenya's volleyball team for the 2024 Summer Olympics in Paris. The team was in pool B and they played three matches in Paris. They played against Brazil, Poland and Japan and they lost all three matches with a score of 3–0.

She was with the national team in Phuket in Thailand in 2025. In an early match against Vietnam, she was the highest scorer in their winning match.
