= Apostolos Oikonomou =

Greek volleyball coach

Personal information
- Full name: Apostolos Oikonomou
- Nationality: Greece
- Born: March 27, 1982 (age 44) Greece

Apostolos Oikonomou (Greek: Απόστολος Οικονόμου; born March 27, 1982) is a Greek volleyball coach, who serves as the head coach of the Greece women's national volleyball team since 2023.

Oikonomou began his coaching career in Greece and has worked with several club teams, including AEK Athens, AO Thiras, and Panathinaikos. He has also coached abroad, including with Finnish club OrPo and the Swiss club, Volley Lugano.

He previously served as an assistant coach of the Greece women's national team, including during the 2012 Olympic qualification campaign and the 2013 European Championship. He returned to the national team as head coach in 2023.

Under Oikonomou, in September 2026, the Greek women national team reached the quarter-finals of the European Championship and finished in 6th place, the best ever for the Greek team.
