= Markella Papageorgiou =

Greek volleyball player

Personal information
- Full name: Markella Papageorgiou
- Nationality: Greece
- Born: December 22, 1999 (age 26) Samos, Greece
- Height: 1.84 m (6 ft 0 in)

Volleyball information
- Position: Middle blocker
- Current club: Panathinaikos
- Number: 18

Career
- Years: Team
- 2015–2017: (Cyprus) Anorthosis Famagusta VC
- 2017–2018: (Greece) Panionios GSS
- 2018–2019: (Greece) Artemis Korydallos
- 2019–2020: (Greece) Ilisiakos
- 2020–2024: (Greece) Thetis Voula
- 2024–2025: (Greece) AO Thiras
- 2025–: (Greece) Panathinaikos

National team
- Years: Team
- 2015–: Greece

Markella Papageorgiou (Greek: Μαρκέλλα Παπαγεωργίου; born 22 December 1999) is a Greek professional volleyball player who plays as a middle blocker. She is a member of the Greece women's national team and plays for Panathinaikos.

Papageorgiou began her career in Greece and also played for Anorthosis Famagusta in Cyprus. She established herself in the Greek Women's Volleyball League with Ilisiakos and Thetis Voula, before joining AO Thiras in 2024 and Panathinaikos in 2025.

In August 2026, she played a key role for the Greece women's national volleyball team, which reached the quarterfinals in the 2026 EuroVolley tournament, held in Brno.
