= Magdalena Jurczyk =

Polish volleyball player (born 1995)

Personal information
- Born: 28 October 1995 (age 30) Krosno
- Height: 183 cm (6 ft 0 in)

Sport
- Club: Developres Bella Dolina Rzeszów
Medal record
Women's Volleyball
Representing Poland
FIVB Nations League
Bronze medal – third place	2023 Arlington	Team
Bronze medal – third place	2024 Bangkok	Team
Bronze medal – third place	2025 Łódź	Team

Magdalena Jurczyk (born 28 October 1995 in Krosno) is a Polish volleyball player, representing her country as a middle blocker.

She comes from the village of Cergowa near Krosno.

She first encountered volleyball in primary school in Dukla. She graduated from PWSZ (Państwowa Wyższa Szkoła Zawodowa) in Krosno with a degree in physical education. She also completed a coaching course in Krosno, where she combined her studies with coaching young volleyball players aged 7–10. Her lifelong dream has been to work in the police. She has an interest in criminology, as she attended a military class in high school.

In mid-April 2022, she was called up to the Polish national team.
