= Hena Kurtagić =

Serbian volleyball player (born 2004)

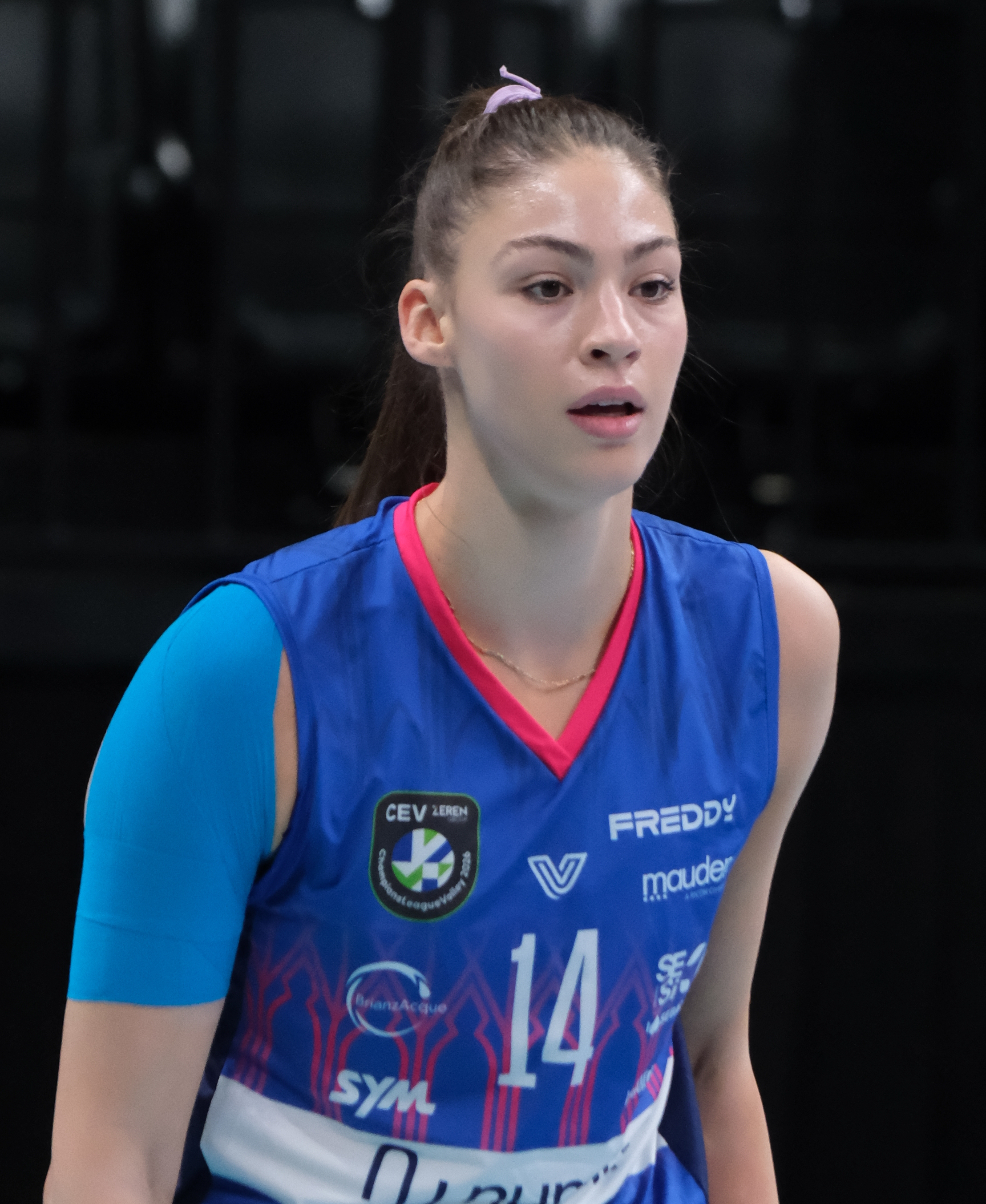
- Kurtagić playing for Vero Volley Milano in 2026

Personal information
- Nickname: Hen
- Nationality: Serbian
- Born: 27 August 2004 (age 22) Novi Pazar, Serbia and Montenegro
- Height: 1.91 m (6 ft 3 in)
- Weight: 85 kg (187 lb)
- Spike: 320 cm (126 in)
- Block: 305 cm (120 in)

Volleyball information
- Position: Middle blocker
- Current club: Vero Volley Milano

Career
- Years: Team
- 2019–2023 2023–present 2023–2024: OK TENT; Vero Volley Milano →Neptunes de Nantes Volley-Ball

National team
- Years: Team
- 2022–: Serbia
Honours
Women's volleyball
Representing Serbia
European Championship
Silver medal – second place	2023 Belgium/Estonia/Germany/Italy	Team
Bronze medal – third place	2026 Sweden/Czechia/Slovakia/Turkey	Team
Mediterranean Games
Bronze medal – third place	2022 Oran	Team
U21 World Championship
Silver medal – second place	2021 Rotterdam	Team
Junior European Championship
Silver medal – second place	2020 Zenica
Silver medal – second place	2022 Skopje
Youth European Championship
Bronze medal – third place	2020 Podgorica

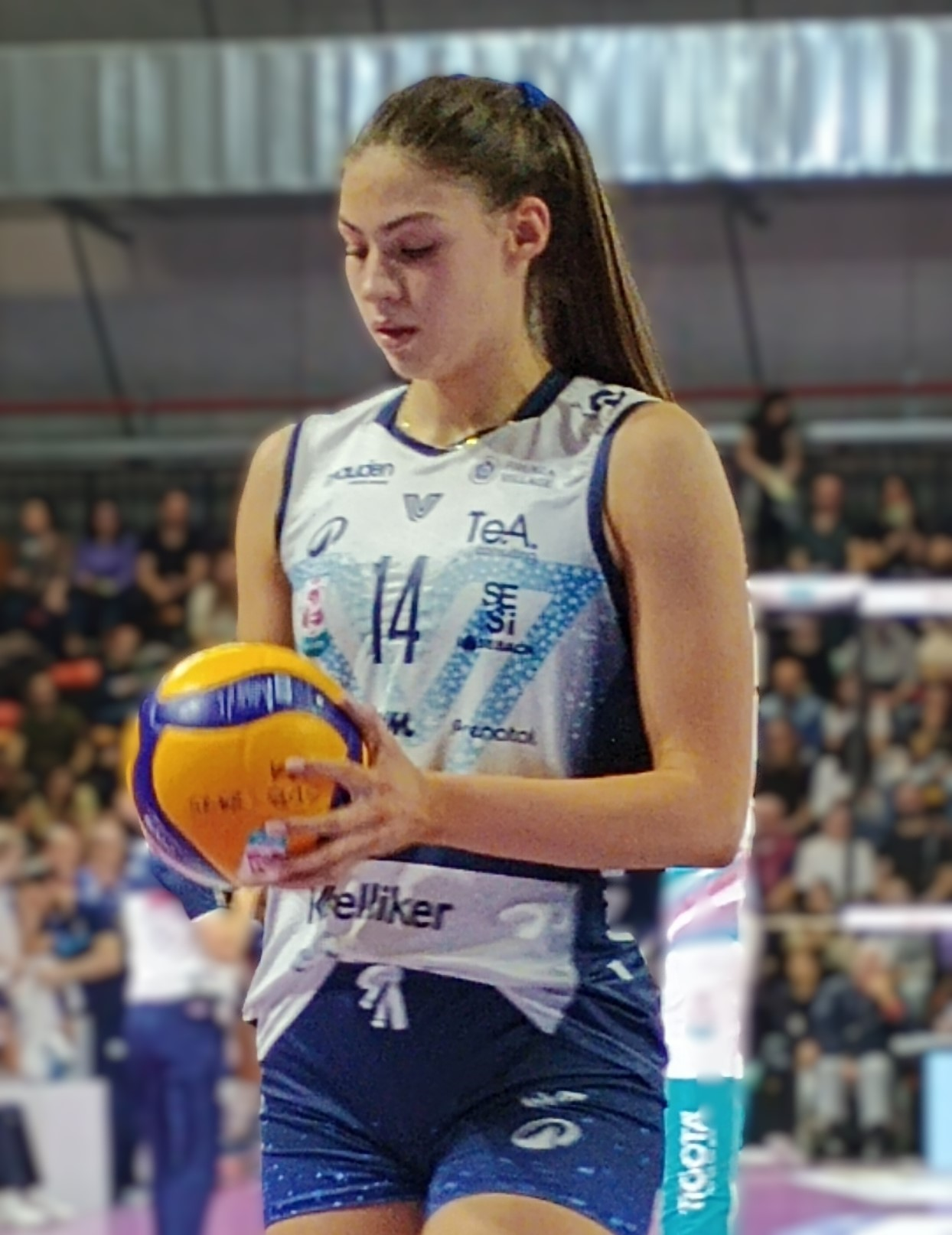
Kurtagić with Vero Volley Milano in 2025

Hena Kurtagić (Serbian Cyrillic: Хена Куртагић; born 27 August 2004) is a Serbian volleyball player. She plays as middle blocker for Italian club Vero Volley Milano.

== Career ==
=== Club ===
Kurtagić started her volleyball career with OK TENT Obrenovac with whom she won the 2019-20 Serbian Super League title.

In the summer of 2023, she joined French side Neptunes de Nantes. With them, she won the 2023-24 French Cup.

In July of 2024, Kurtagić joined Italian Serie A1 side Vero Volley. In October 2025, she won her first trophy with the club after defeating Imoco Volley Conegliano in the Italian Supercup.

=== National team ===
Kurtagić is a member of the Serbia women's national volleyball team. She had international debut for senior national team at the 2022 Mediterranean Games. In 2023 she participated in the first week of 2023 Nations League.

== Personal life ==
As of 2026, Kurtagić is in a relationship with Bulgarian volleyball player Aleksandar Nikolov.

== Awards ==
=== National team ===
- 2023 Women's European Volleyball Championship - Silver Medal

=== Club ===
OK TENT

- Serbian League: 2020

Neptunes de Nantes VB

- French Cup: 2024

Vero Volley Milano

- 2024 FIVB Club World Championship – Bronze medal
- 2025 Italian Super Cup – Champion

=== Individual ===
Club

- 2023–24 CEV Challenge Cup - Best Blocker
- 2024 FIVB Volleyball Club World Championship - Best middle blocker

National team

- 2020 U17 Volleyball European Championship - Best middle blocker
- 2020 U19 Volleyball European Championship - Best middle blocker
- 2021 FIVB Volleyball U20 World Championship - Best middle blocker
- 2021 FIVB Volleyball U18 World Championship - Best middle blocker
- 2022 U19 Volleyball European Championship - Best middle blocker
