= Eirini Chatziefstratiadou =

Greek volleyball player

Personal information
- Full name: Eirini Chatziefstratiadou
- Nationality: Greece
- Born: September 2, 1995 (age 31) Thessaloniki, Greece
- Height: 1.85 m (6 ft 1 in)
- Weight: 78 kg (172 lb)
- Spike: 282 cm (111 in)
- Block: 237 cm (93 in)

Volleyball information
- Position: Middle blocker
- Current club: Olympiacos
- Number: 1

Career
- Years: Team
- 2009–2013: (Greece) Aias Evosmou
- 2013–2015: (United States) Miami Dade College
- 2015–2017: (United States) Columbia College
- 2017–2018: (Hungary) MTK Budapest
- 2018–2019: (Greece) AON Pannaxiakos
- 2019–2021: (Greece) AO Thiras
- 2021–2026: (Greece) Panathinaikos
- 2026–: (Greece) Olympiacos

National team
- Years: Team
- 2011–: Greece

Eirini Chatziefstratiadou (Greek: Ειρήνη Χατζηευστρατιάδου; born September 2, 1995, in Thessaloniki) is a Greek female professional volleyball player who plays as a middle blocker. She is a member of the Greece women's national volleyball team.

She began her career with Aias Evosmou before moving to the United States at the age of 18 to combine her studies with volleyball. She played for Miami Dade College and later Columbia College before returning to Europe.

She played for MTK Budapest in Hungary during the 2017–18 season, followed by AON Pannaxiakos and AO Thiras in Greece. In 2021, she joined Panathinaikos, where she remained for five seasons.

In May 2026, Chatziefstratiadou signed for Olympiacos, joining the club for the 2026–27 season after five seasons with Panathinaikos.

== International career ==
Chatziefstratiadou represented Greece at youth level, including the 2011 European Youth Olympic Festival and the 2011 European U18 Championship. She was also part of Greece's junior national team during qualification for the 2012 European Junior Championship.

She made appearances for the senior Greece women's national volleyball team in the 2019 Women's European Volleyball Championship and the 2019 Women's European Volleyball Silver League. She subsequently represented Greece at the 2021 Women's European Volleyball Championship, the 2022 Mediterranean Games, the 2023 Women's European Volleyball Championship, the 2025 Women's European Volleyball Golden League, and the 2026 Women's European Volleyball Championship.

At the 2022 Mediterranean Games, she was listed on the Greece women's roster as a middle blocker, wearing shirt number 1 and measuring 1.85 metres in height.

At the 2026 Women's European Volleyball Championship, she made her European Championship debut and was among the key players in Greece's campaign.

== Awards ==
=== Club ===
- Greek Cup: 2022 – Champion, with Panathinaikos

=== Individual ===
- Greek Women's Volleyball League: 20th round MVP, 2024–25
