= Greece women's national volleyball team =

Women's national volleyball team representing Greece

Greece
- Association: Hellenic Volleyball Federation
- Confederation: CEV
- Head coach: Apostolos Oikonomou
- FIVB ranking: 30 ▼1 (24 May 2026)

Uniforms
Home	Away

World Championship
- Appearances: 2 (First in 2002)
- Best result: 10th place (2002)
- Website

Greece women's national volleyball team
Medal record

Mediterranean Games
Silver medal – second place	2005 Almería	Women's tournament
Silver medal – second place	2018 Tarragona	Women's tournament
Bronze medal – third place	1991 Athens	Women's tournament

European League
Bronze medal – third place	2015 Hungary	Women's tournament
Bronze medal – third place	2016 Azerbaijan	Women's tournament

The Greece women's national volleyball team represents Greece in international women's volleyball competitions and friendly matches. The team first competed on the highest level at the 1985 European Championship, finishing in 12th place.

== Results ==
=== Olympic Games ===
- 2004 — 9th place

=== World Championship ===
- 1952 to 1998 — did not qualify
- 2002 — 11th place
- 2006 to 2022 — did not qualify
- 2025 — 21st place

=== World Grand Prix ===
- 2004 — did not qualify

=== European Championship ===
- 1949 to 1983 — did not qualify
- 1985 — 12th place
- 1987 — did not qualify
- 1989 — did not qualify
- 1991 — 8th place
- 1993 — 9th place
- 1995 to 1999 — did not qualify
- 2001 — 9th place
- 2003 to 2017 — did not qualify
- 2019 — 14th place
- 2021 — 22nd place
- 2023 — 19th place
- 2026 — 6th place

=== European League ===
- 2009 — 7th place
- 2010 — 7th place
- 2012 — 10th place
- 2014 — 8th place
- 2015 — 3rd place
- 2016 — 3rd place
- 2017 — did not qualify
- 2018 — did not qualify
- 2019 — 15th place
- 2020 — cancelled
- 2021 — did not qualify
- 2022 — did not qualify
- 2025 — 7th place
- 2026 — 7th place

== Team ==
The following is the Greek roster in the 2026 European Championship.

- Head Coach: (Greece) Apostolos Oikonomou.

No.	Name	Date of birth	Height	Weight	2025–26 Club	2026–27 Club
1	Eirini Chatziefstratiadou	2 September 1995	1.85 m (6 ft 1 in)	80 kg (180 lb)	(Greece) Panathinaikos	(Greece) Olympiacos
3	Elpida Tikmanidou	29 August 2008	1.84 m (6 ft 0 in)	81 kg (179 lb)	(Greece) ZAON Kifissia	(Greece) ZAON Kifissia
4	Evangelia Tani	22 July 2004	1.82 m (6 ft 0 in)	76 kg (168 lb)	(Greece) Panathinaikos	(Greece) PAOK
6	Styliani Gkiourda	15 March 2002	1.85 m (6 ft 1 in)	78 kg (172 lb)	(Romania) Michelbeke	(Romania) Tchalou
10	Maria Klepkou	13 May 2000	1.78 m (5 ft 10 in)	71 kg (157 lb)	(Greece) AEK	TBA
11	Lamprini Konstantinidou	2 September 1995	1.84 m (6 ft 0 in)	79 kg (174 lb)	(Greece) Panathinaikos	(Greece) Panathinaikos
13	Effrosyni Bakodimou	25 January 2000	1.81 m (5 ft 11 in)	68 kg (150 lb)	(Italy) Volley Talmassons	(Italy) Volley Talmassons
14	Maria Xanthopoulou	24 October 1998	1.63 m (5 ft 4 in)	53 kg (117 lb)	(Greece) Panionios	(Greece) Panionios
16	Georgina Antonakaki	16 September 2002	1.75 m (5 ft 9 in)	56 kg (123 lb)	(Greece) Panathinaikos	(Greece) Panathinaikos
18	Markella Papageorgiou	22 December 1999	1.86 m (6 ft 1 in)	77 kg (170 lb)	(Greece) Panathinaikos	(Greece) Panathinaikos
20	Georgia-Loula Angelopoulou	11 February 2005	1.80 m (5 ft 11 in)	68 kg (150 lb)	(Greece) Panionios	(Greece) AO Markopoulo
28	Errika-Pelagia Gravari	11 February 2005	1.88 m (6 ft 2 in)	74 kg (163 lb)	(Greece) ZAON Kifissia	(Greece) AEK
91	Martha Anthouli	13 August 2004	2.02 m (6 ft 8 in)	95 kg (209 lb)	(Turkey) Aras Kargo SK	(Turkey) Aras Kargo SK

=== Notable Roster ===
- 2004 Summer Olympics — 9th Place
  Zanna Proniadu, Maria Gkaragkouni, Niki Gkaragkouni, Eleni Memetzi, Charikleia Sakkoula, Eleftheria Chatzinikou, Ioanna Vlachou, Vasiliki Papazoglou, Sofia Iordanidou, Georgia Tzanaki, Eleni Kiosi and Rouxantra-Kon Ntoumitreskou. Head coach: (Greece) Dimitrios Floros.
