= Brno Exhibition Centre =

Convention centre in Brno, Czech Republic

- Brněnské výstaviště

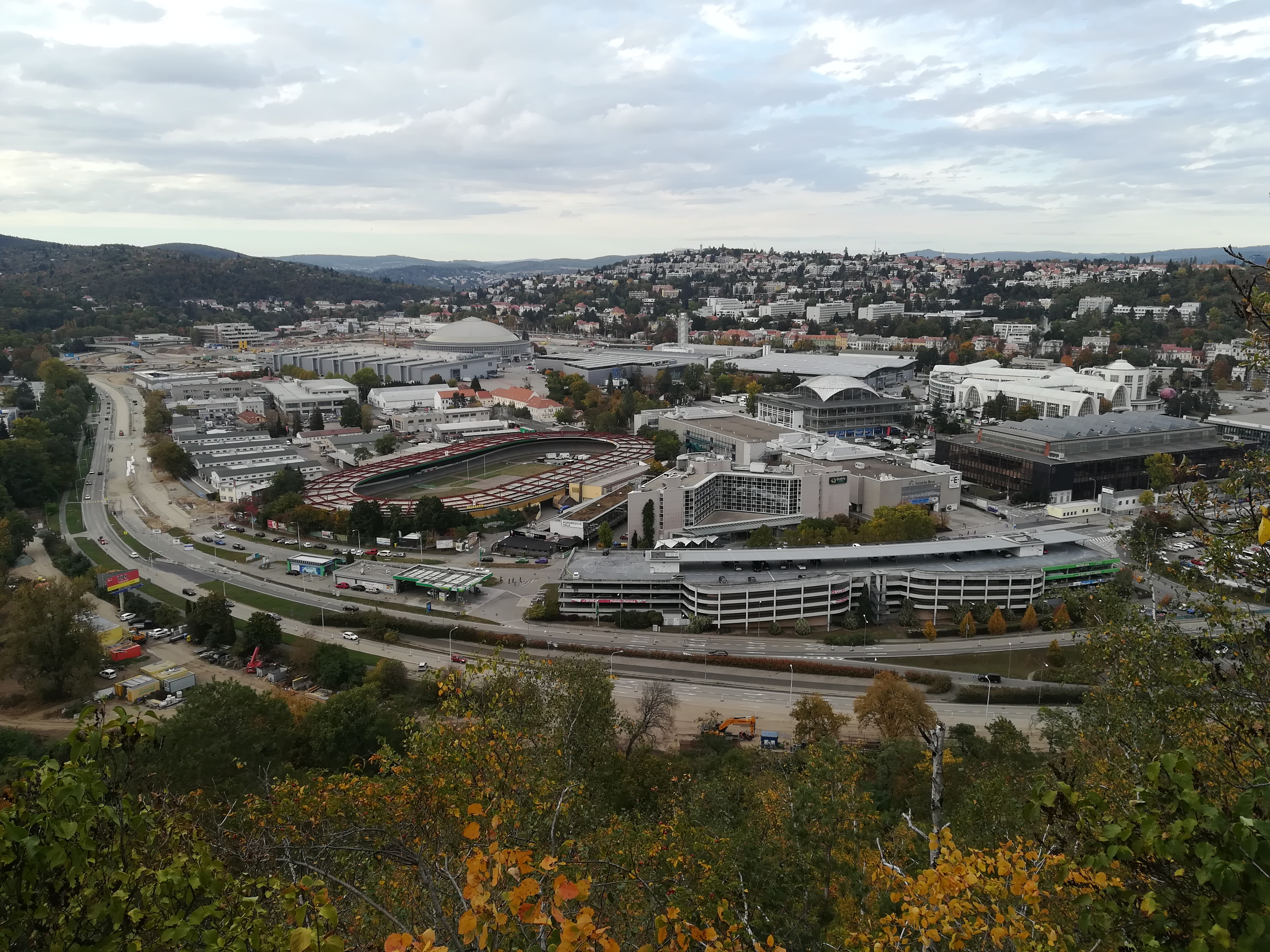
- Interactive map of Brno Exhibition Centre
- Location: Brno, Czech Republic
- Coordinates: 49°11′15″N 16°34′41″E
- Capacity: 30,000
- Type: Exhibition centre

Construction
- Built: 1927–1928
- Opened: 1928

Website
- https://www.bvv.cz/

Brno Exhibition Center (Czech: Brněnské výstaviště) is a convention centre based in Brno, Czech Republic. It was established in 1928. The centre occupies a site on 667,000 square metres (7,180,000 sq ft) and provides a total net exhibition area of 125,496 square metres (1,350,830 sq ft) including open-air space and exhibition halls with an exhibition area of 61,479 square metres (661,750 sq ft). The centre has 15 exhibition halls with a visitor capacity of 25,000–30,000 (maximum 60,000) a day. The number of visitors per year grew to 780,000 in 2017.

== The tradition ==
The city of Brno has a tradition of trade fairs, which is inseparable from the industrial development of the city into an industrial, scientific, and logistics hub in Central Europe. Annual markets and trade exhibitions were held in Brno since 1243. As a result of the booming textile industry in the city, the first trade shows were held in the 18th century. Since 1821, regular trade exhibitions have been held in Brno. Wholesale merchants from Vienna, Linz, Saxony, Hungary and Turkey attended the annual markets in Brno, i.e. from the same regions as today. 104,000 visitors attended the Imperial Jubilee Exhibition in 1888, the largest exhibition held in Brno until that time. From 1922 – 1927, Brno Annual Exhibition Markets were regularly held.

== Milestones ==
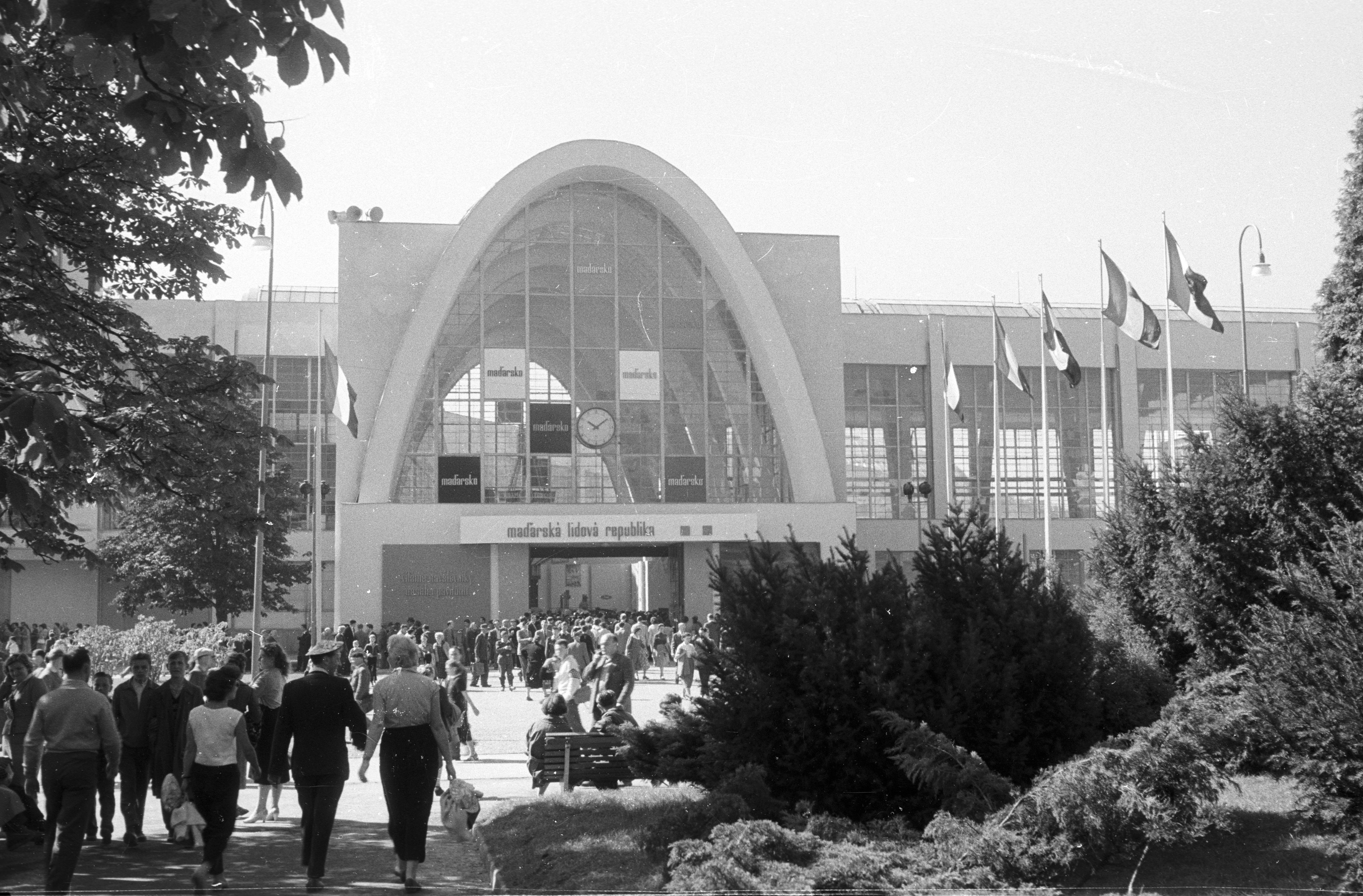
Functionalist Hall A, pictured in 1959

- 1923 – Brno municipality counselors decided on the project of a new international exhibition centre
- 1927 – 1928 – construction of the Brno Exhibition Centre was completed
- May 26, 1928 – inauguration of the Exhibition of Contemporary Culture in Czechoslovakia under the patronage of Tomáš G. Masaryk, the first President of Czechoslovakia
- 1956 – Exhibition of Czechoslovak Engineering
- 1958 – International Engineering Fair (MSV Brno)
- 1991 – privatization of Brno Trade Fairs and Exhibitions Co.
- 1998 – acquisition by strategic partner Messe Düsseldorf, modernization of the exhibition centre

== Exhibition of Contemporary Culture in Czechoslovakia 1928 ==
By its construction on the purpose of the Exhibition of Contemporary Culture in Czechoslovakia 1928, the city of Brno gained an exhibition centre in Central Europe. The parabolic arch has become a symbol of the Brno exhibition center. It is embodied in the corporate logo of Trade Fairs Brno Co. Lead architects of the pavilions were Josef Kalous and Jaroslav Valenta.

Tomáš G. Masaryk, the first President of Czechoslovakia, was the patron of the exhibition which commemorated the 10th anniversary of the independent Czechoslovak state.

== The architecture ==
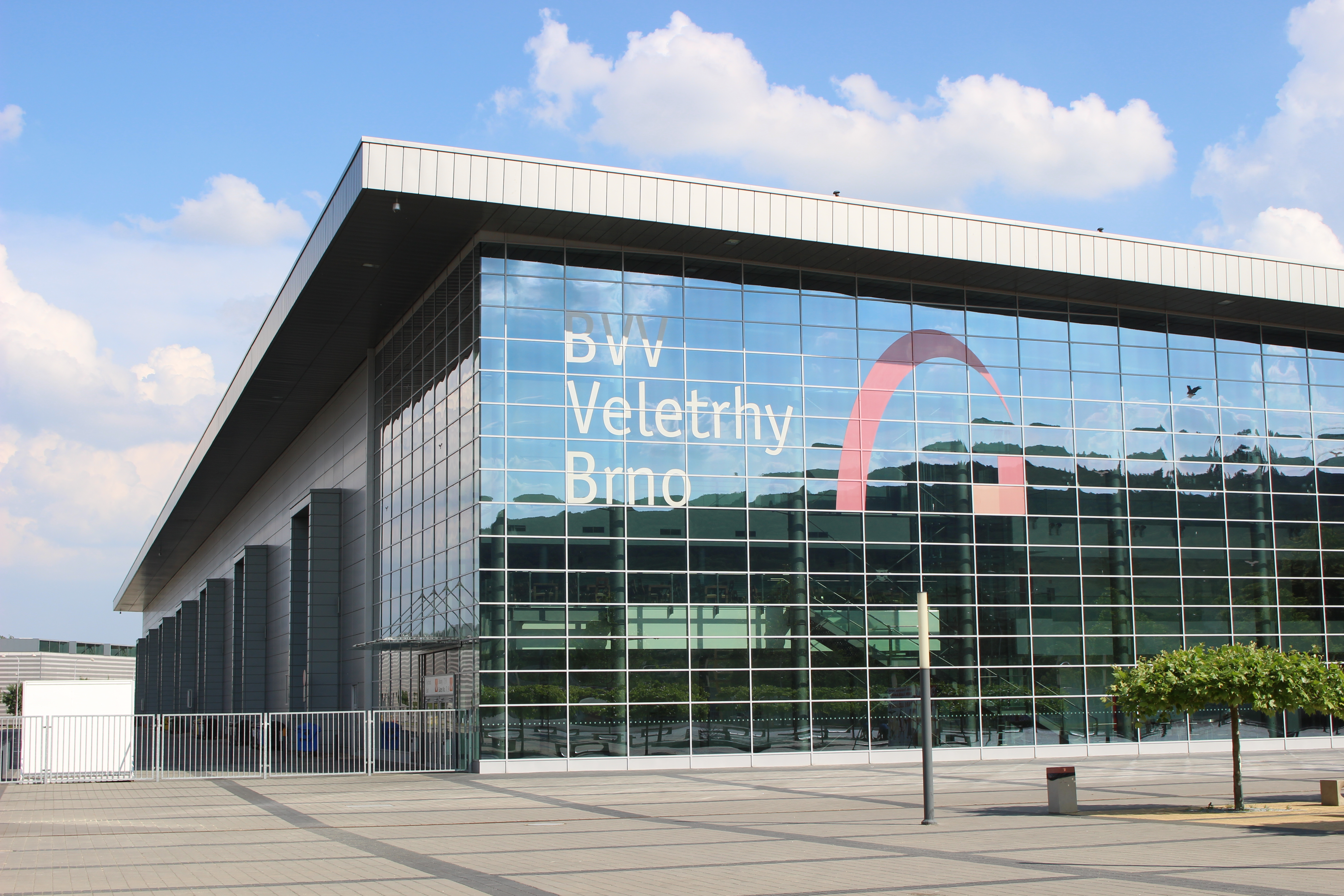
Hall P

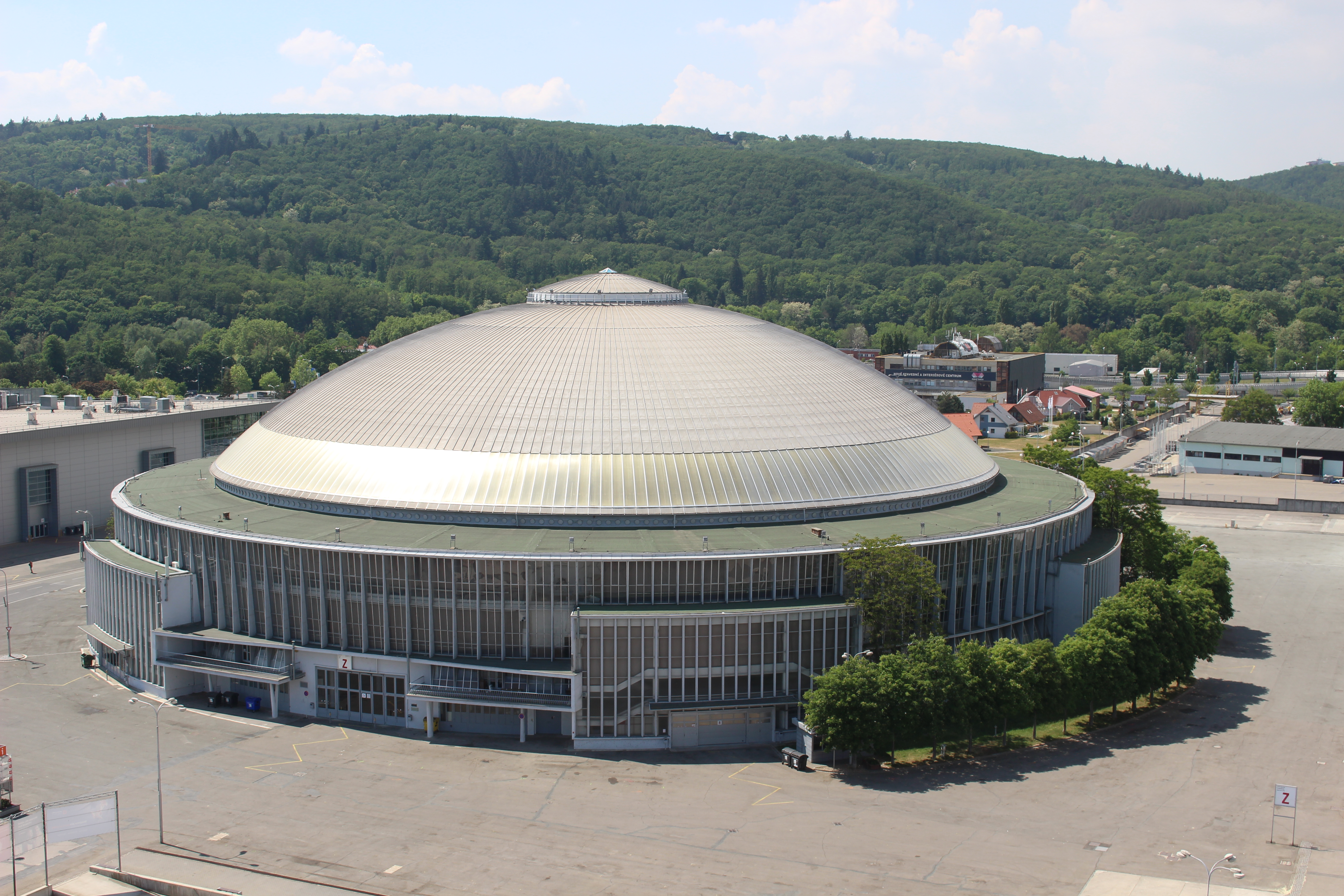
Hall Z in Brussels style

Along with the Villa Tugendhat, a prevalent building from this period, designed by Ludwig Mies van der Rohe, the modernist architecture of the Brno Exhibition Centre manifested the new identity of Czechoslovak society with the spirit of modern ideas and technological progress.

"In the city of Brno modernism lives on. Brno, the capital of Moravia and the Czech Republic's second-largest city, is a long way from Chicago. But in the 1920s and 1930s, it was one of the hotbeds of Modernism in Central Europe", wrote the International Herald Tribune.

The fairgrounds with the Exhibition of Contemporary Culture in Czechoslovakia 1928 is said to have become a turning point in Czech design and architecture. Examples of its architecture were displayed in the Museum of Modern Art in New York City and appeared in the publication The International Style & Architecture, which introduced modernism to the United States. The monumental dome of hall Z, designed by architect Ferdinand Lederer, and in the early 1960s, the Administration Office Building by architect Miroslav Spurný, are other examples of local buildings influenced by modernism. The modernization after 2000 complemented the avant-garde style of the center. The latest multi-functional hall P with 12,000 sqm, opened in June 2009, is the largest exhibition facility of its kind in Central Europe.

== Events ==
Since 1958, Brno Exhibition Center is internationally known through the International Engineering Fair (MSV Brno). The MSV served as a business meeting point between "East and West", fostering technology transfer and information. Today, it serves as the business meeting point in the Central European EU-member states. 12,000 Czech and international firms and about 1 million visitors attend the trade and other events held at the center.

Besides trade shows and exhibitions, the centre is a venue for political summits, conventions, concerts, sporting events, corporate gatherings and presentations. The center's hall interiors and exteriors are suitable for film making purposes and is used by film production teams for shooting commercials, music videos, or movie scenes with a large number of persons or audience.

Among other events the Czech Summit 2007, summit of the presidents of the Central and South-Eastern European states, and the 2009 EU Meeting of agricultural ministers under the Czech EU presidency were held there. The Rolling Stones chose the Brno Exhibition Centre for the 2007 A Bigger Bang European Tour.

== Bibliography ==
- Müller, Zdeněk (2002). Brněnské výstaviště : stavba století : stavební vývoj 1928–2002 (1. vyd. ed.). Brno: Veletrhy Brno. ISBN 80-7293-049-4.
- Zdeněk Müller – Exhibition of Contemporary Culture 1928, 2008.
- Ludvík Kundera – Svět mezi dvěma stráněmi 1928 – 2008 (80 let brněnského výstaviště), 2008.
- Václav Svoboda a kol. – Brno – The City and Its Trade Fairs, 1998.
- Václav Svoboda – Brněnské veletrhy, Cesta k jejich současnosti.
- From The Exhibition of Contemporary Culture 1928 to the Exhibition Centre and Trade Shows for Central Europe, Czech Centres/Ministry of Foreign Affairs, BVV, 2008.
