= Elpida Tikmanidou =

Greek volleyball player

Personal information
- Full name: Elpida Tikmanidou
- Nationality: Greece
- Born: August 29, 2008 (age 18) Ioannina, Greece
- Height: 1.82 m (6 ft 0 in)

Volleyball information
- Position: Outside hitter
- Current club: ZAON
- Number: 3

Career
- Years: Team
- 2022–2023: (Greece) AS Giannena
- 2023–2024: (Greece) AO Dexameni Metamorfosis
- 2024–: (Greece) ZAON

National team
- Years: Team
- 2023–: Greece

Elpida Tikmanidou (Greek: Ελπίδα Τικμανίδου; born August 29, 2008, in Ioannina) is a Greek professional volleyball player who plays as an outside hitter and is a basic member of the Greece women's national volleyball team. She currently plays for the Greek club, ZAON.

She started her career in volleyball in Ioannina with the team, AS Giannena. Later, she was selected for the youth national teams of Greece. She was also included in Greece's under-17 squad in 2023.

She played for AO Dexameni Metamorfosis in the 2023–24 season. She later was transferred to the club, ZAON and played for it in the 2024–25 season. In the ZAON team, Tikmanidou played a key role to finally win promotion to the Greek Women's Volleyball League in 2025.

In the 2025–26 season at the Greek league, Tikmanidou emerged as one of ZAON's leading offensive players.

== International career ==
Tikmanidou played for Greece national team at youth level in the 2023 U17 European Volleyball Championship cycle. She later played for the Greece women's under-18 and under-20 national teams in 2024.

She was selected for the senior Greece women's national volleyball team in 2025 and played at the 2025 FIVB Women's Volleyball World Championship.

In 2026, she had a key role for the Greek team at the 2026 Women's European Volleyball Championship, held in Brno, helping Greece to attain the 6th position in the European tournament.

== Awards ==
=== Club ===
- Greek Women's Volleyball League promotion: 2025 – Promoted to the top division, with ZAON
