= Effrosyni Bakodimou =

Greek volleyball player

Effrosyni Bakodimou (Greek: Ευφροσύνη Μπακοδήμου; born 25 January 2000 in Athens), also known as Fay Bakodimou, is a Greek professional volleyball player who plays as an outside hitter.

She is a member of the Greece women's national team and plays for Italian club Volley Talmassons.

== International career ==
She played for Greece in youth competitions. Later, she became basic member of the Greece women's national volleyball team.

In 2026, she was selected for Greece's squad and played initially at the EuroVolley 2026, but she got injured in the game against France.
