= Martha Anthouli =

Greek volleyball player

- Anthouli in 2026

Personal information
- Full name: Martha-Evdokia Anthouli
- Nationality: Greece
- Born: August 13, 2004 (age 22) Peraia, Greece
- Height: 2.04 m (6 ft 8 in)
- Weight: 95 kg (209 lb)

Volleyball information
- Position: Opposite hitter
- Current club: Aras Kargo SK

National team
- Years: Team
- 2021–: Greece

Martha Anthouli (Greek: Μάρθα-Ευδοκία Ανθούλη; born 13 August 2004 in Peraia, Thessaloniki) is a Greek professional volleyball player who plays as an opposite hitter. Since 2021, she represents the Greece women's national team, and also plays for the Turkish club Aras Kargo since 2025.

She began her senior professional career with ASP Thetis Voula in the 2021–22 season. She later moved to the Athens clab of Panathinaikos, in where she won the Greek Women's Volleyball League championship in the 2022–23 season. In August 2023, she moved to Italy to play for the club, Chieri '76. During her two seasons with Chieri, she competed in the European volleyball competitions, and was a key part for the club to win the CEV Cup in 2024.

In August 2026, Anthouli played a key role for the Greek national team in the European Volleyball Championships, helping Greece to finish in the 6th place, the best ever for Greece in this competition.
