= AEK Women's Volleyball Club =

Greek volleyball club

AEK
- Full name: AEK Women's Volleyball Club
- Nickname: Énosis (Union); Kitrinómavres (The Yellow-Blacks); Vasílissa (Queen); AEK tis Kardiás (AEK of Heart)
- Founded: 1995
- Ground: Olympic Village Indoor Hall (Capacity: 350)
- Chairman: Alexis Alexiou
- Head coach: Konstantinos Tambouratzis
- League: A1 Ethniki
- 2025–26: A1 Ethniki, 4th
- Website: Club home page
- Championships: 1

Uniforms
| Home | Away |

AEK Women's Volleyball Club is the women's volleyball section of the major Greek multi-sport club of AEK. It was founded in 1995 and has won one Greek Championship (2011–12), one Greek Cup (2022–23), and one Greek Super Cup (2011–12).

== History ==
The women's volleyball club was established in 1930 and dissolved after a few years. It was re-established in 1995, after a merger with the Alsoupolis group, and participated for the first time in the local championship of Athens. The club gradually gained promotion to A1 Ethniki. Nevertheless, it was not well-prepared for participation in the first professional division and was relegated.

In the 2003–04 season, the club competed in the second professional division. The club was promoted to A1 Ethniki after winning the 2005–06 second professional division.

In the 2011–12 season, AEK won the A1 Ethniki for the first time in its history against Panathinaikos. They have also won the 2011–12 Greek Super Cup against Olympiacos.

In the first years, the volleyball departments of AEK were housed in the indoor "Leontios Hall" in Patissia and since 1989 in the historic Georgios Moschos Indoor Hall.

On 11 March 2023, the club won the first Greek Cup against Panathinaikos in Arta. This was the third top-tier national title for the women's department.

On 8 October 2025, the club won the 2025 BVA Cup. In the quarter-finals, the club defeated Fit Fun Volley Skopje 3–0 and advanced to the semi-finals, where it achieved the same result against Herceg Novi. In the final, AEK Athens won 3–0 against KV Drita Gjilan of Kosovo.

== Recent seasons ==
| Season | Division | Place | Notes |
|---|---|---|---|
| 2002–03 | A1 Ethniki | 11th | Relegated to A2 |
| 2005–06 | A2 Ethniki | 1st | Promoted to A1 |
| 2006–07 | A1 Ethniki | 10th | |
| 2007–08 | A1 Ethniki | 11th | Relegated to A2 |
| 2009–10 | A2 Ethniki | 1st | Promoted to A1 |
| 2010–11 | A1 Ethniki | 3rd | Runners-up Greek Cup |
| 2011–12 | A1 Ethniki | 1st | Winners Greek Super Cup |
| 2012–13 | A1 Ethniki | 2nd | Runners-up Greek Cup |
| 2013–14 | A1 Ethniki | 2nd | |
| 2014–15 | A1 Ethniki | 4th | |
| 2015–16 | A1 Ethniki | 6th | Runners-up Greek Cup |
| 2016–17 | A1 Ethniki | 12th | Relegated to Pre League |
| 2017–18 | Pre League | 3rd | |
| 2018–19 | Pre League | 3rd | |
| 2019–20 | Pre League | 1st | Promoted to A1 |
| 2020–21 | A1 Ethniki | 3rd | |
| 2021–22 | A1 Ethniki | 6th | |
| 2022–23 | A1 Ethniki | 4th | Winners Greek Cup |
| 2023–24 | A1 Ethniki | 3rd | Runners-up Greek Cup |
| 2024–25 | A1 Ethniki | 6th | Winners BVA Cup |
| 2025–26 | A1 Ethniki | 4th | |

== Honours ==
AEK W.V.C. honours aek.gr
| Type | Competition | Titles | Winners | Runners-up | Third place | Ref. |
|---|---|---|---|---|---|---|
| Continental | BVA Cup | 1 | 2025 | | | |
| Domestic | Greek A1 Volleyball League | 1 | 2011–12 | 2012–13, 2013–14 | 2010–11, 2020–21, 2023–24 | |
| Domestic | Greek A2 Volleyball League | 2^{s} | 2005–06 (Group A), 2009–10 (Group B) | | | |
| Domestic | Pre League | 1 | 2019–20 | | 2017–18, 2018–19 | |
| Domestic | Greek Volleyball Cup | 1 | 2022–23 | 2010–11, 2012–13, 2015–16, 2023–24 | | |
| Domestic | Greek Volleyball Super Cup | 1 | 2011–12 | | | |

- record
- ^{S} Shared record

== Performance in international competitions ==
| Season | Achievement | Notes |
CEV Cup
| 2012–13 | 16th finals | eliminated by Ses Calais, 3–2 win in Nea Filadelfeia, 2–3 loss in Calais |
| 2013–14 | 16th finals | eliminated by SVS Post Schwechat, 3–2 win in Nea Filadelfeia, 1–3 loss in Vienna |
CEV Challenge Cup
| 2014–15 | Qualification | eliminated by ŽOK Bimal-Jedinstvo Brčko, 3–0 win in Nea Filadelfeia, 0–3 (golden set) loss in Brčko |
| 2015–16 | Qualification | eliminated by Minchanka Minsk, 2–3 loss in Minsk, 0–3 loss in Nea Filadelfeia |
| 2024–25 | 16th finals | eliminated by Sporting CP, 0–3 loss in Lisbon, 1–3 loss in Nea Filadelfeia |
BVA Cup
| 2025 | Winners | defeated Fit Fun Volley, 3–0, in the QF, Herceg Novi, 3–0, in the SF, and KV Drita, 3–0 in the F in Skenderaj |

== The Balkan Cup glory path ==
2025 BVA Cup

| Round | Team | Home | Away | Aggregate | Qual. |
|---|---|---|---|---|---|
| 1st game | (North Macedonia) Fit Fun Volley Skopje | 3–0 | – | 3–0 | |
| 2nd game | (Montenegro) Herceg Novi | – | 0–3 | 3–0 | |
| 3rd game | (Kosovo) KV Drita Gjilan | 3–0 | – | 3–0 | |

== Team ==
Season 2026–2027

2026–2027 Team
| Number | Player | Position | Height (m) | Birth date |
|---|---|---|---|---|
| 1 | (Peru) Ángela Leyva | Outside hitter | 1.84 | 22 November 1996 (age 29) |
| 3 | (Greece) Vivian Zafeiriou | Outside hitter | 1.79 | 8 July 2006 (age 20) |
| 4 | (Greece) Georgia Mitakidou | Middle blocker | 1.87 | 14 April 1999 (age 27) |
| 5 | (Greece) Melina Emmanouilidou | Middle blocker | 1.84 | 18 September 1994 (age 32) |
| 6 | (Greece) Katerina Sakka | Libero | 1.70 | 21 March 2003 (age 23) |
| 8 | (Belgium) Ilka Van de Vyver | Setter | 1.79 | 26 January 1993 (age 33) |
| 9 | (Greece) Athanasia Fakopoulidou | Outside hitter | 1.80 | 22 May 1998 (age 28) |
| 11 | (Greece) Marina Tsochatzi | Setter | 1.78 | 17 July 1993 (age 33) |
| 12 | (Italy) Terry Enweonwu | Opposite | 1.87 | 12 May 2000 (age 26) |
| 13 | (Italy) Giulia Melli | Outside hitter | 1.84 | 8 January 1998 (age 28) |
| 14 | (Greece) Eleftheria Maniatogianni | Libero | 1.61 | 9 December 1995 (age 30) |
| 15 | (Greece) Angeliki Kavvadia | Middle blocker | 1.89 | 17 February 1994 (age 32) |
| 16 | (Japan) Ai Kurogo | Opposite | 1.80 | 14 June 1998 (age 28) |
| 18 | (Greece) Errika-Pelagia Gravari | Middle blocker | 1.88 | 4 November 2006 (age 19) |

== List of former and current players ==
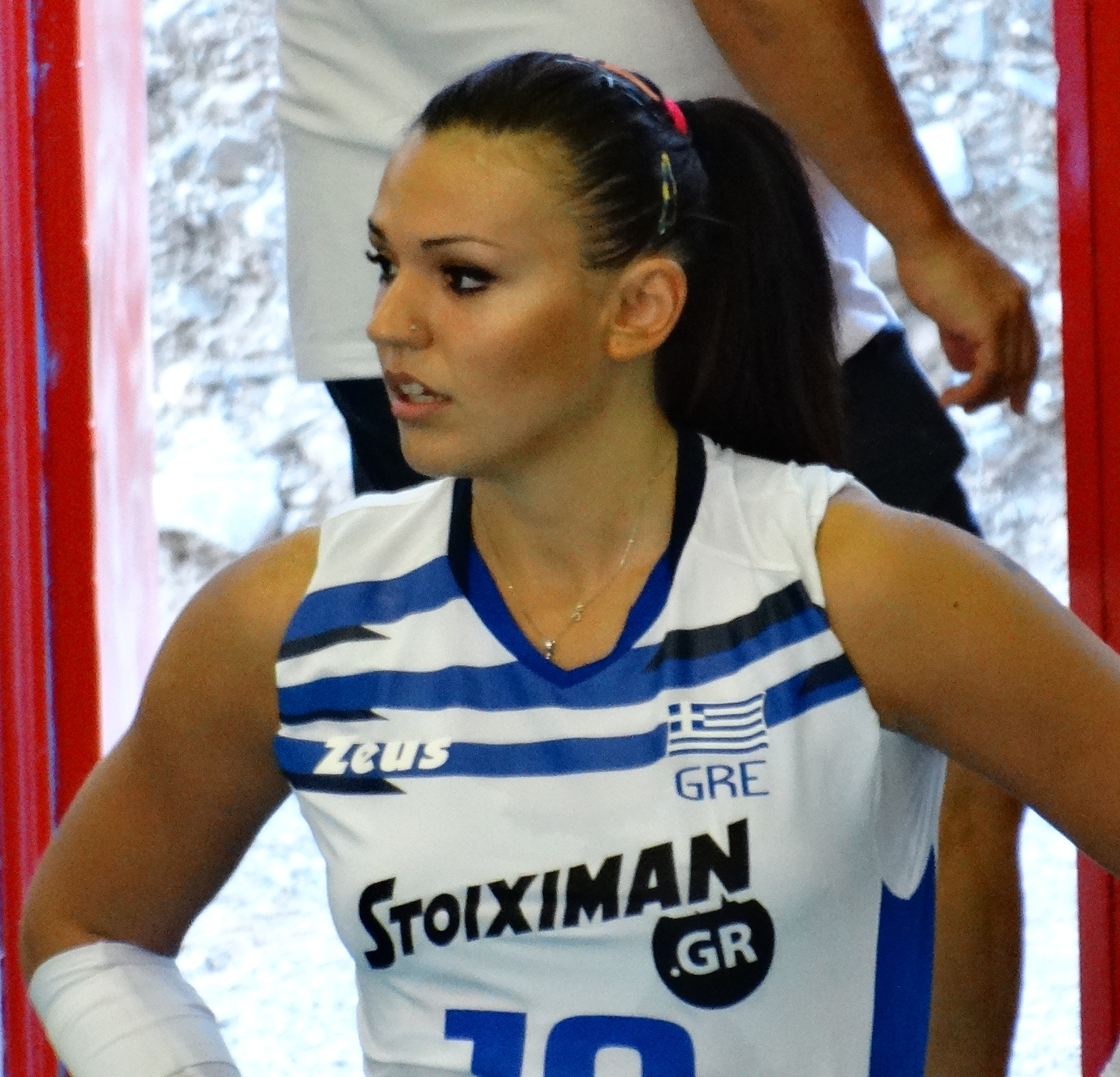
Eva Chantava

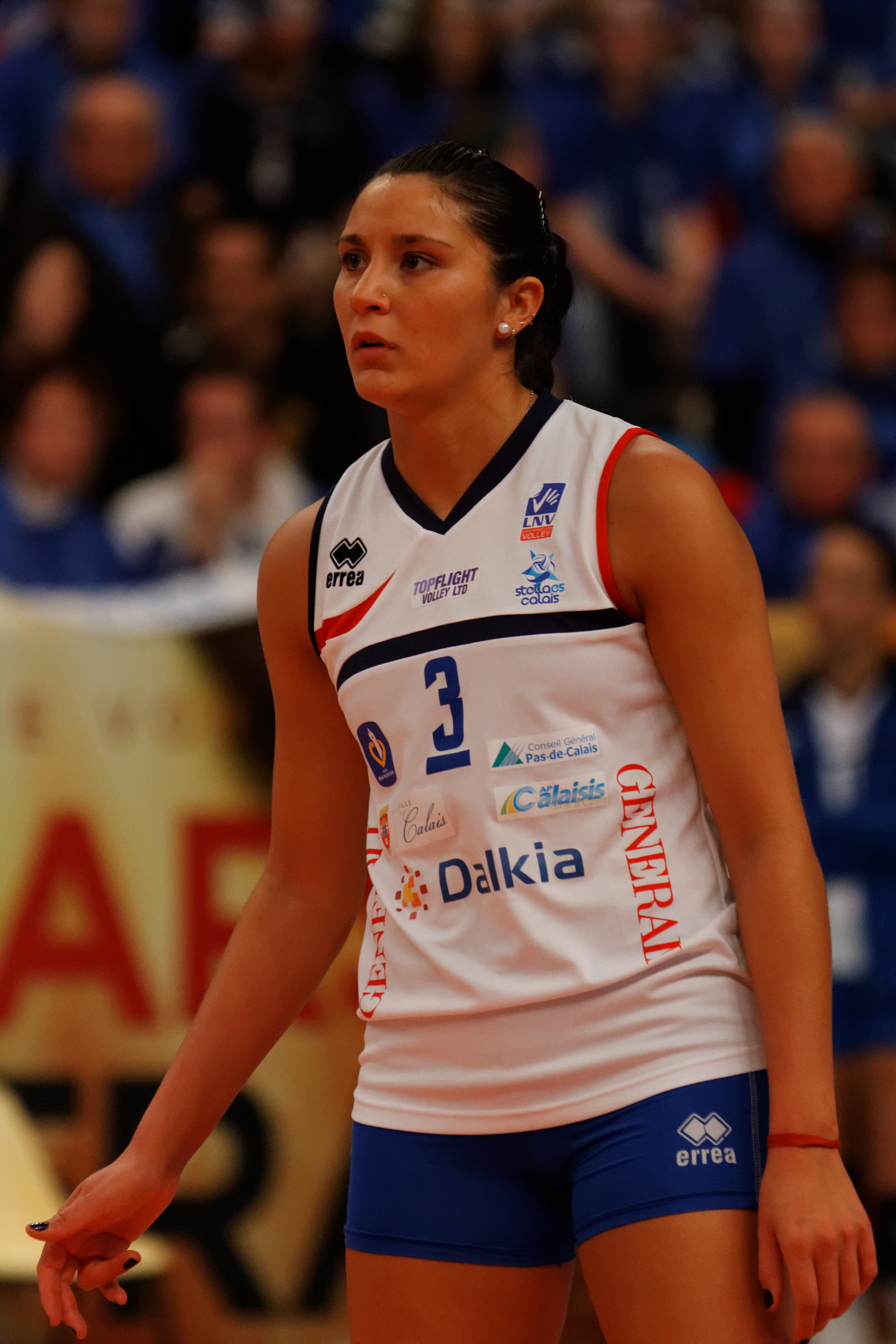
Yamila Nizetich

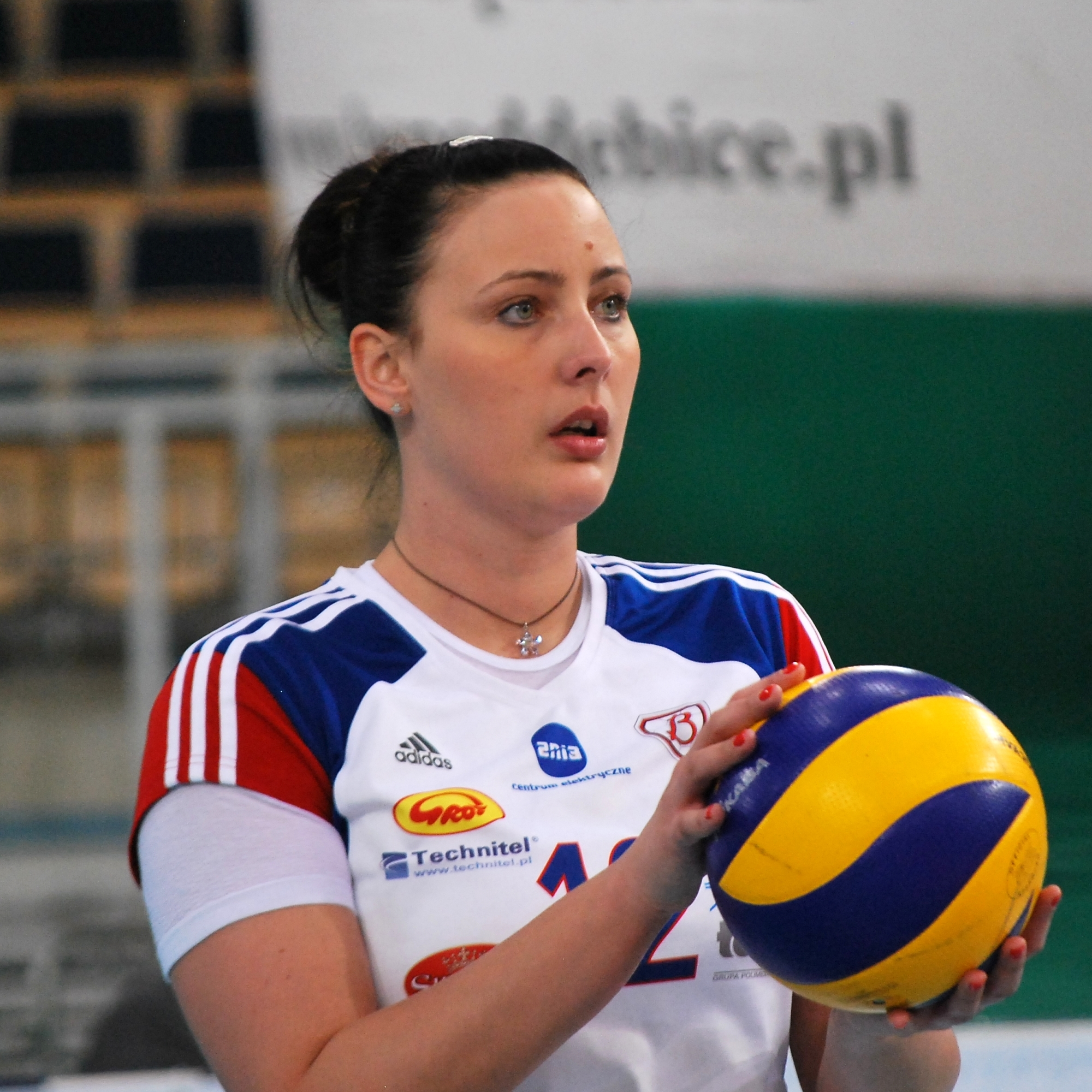
Aleksandra Kruk

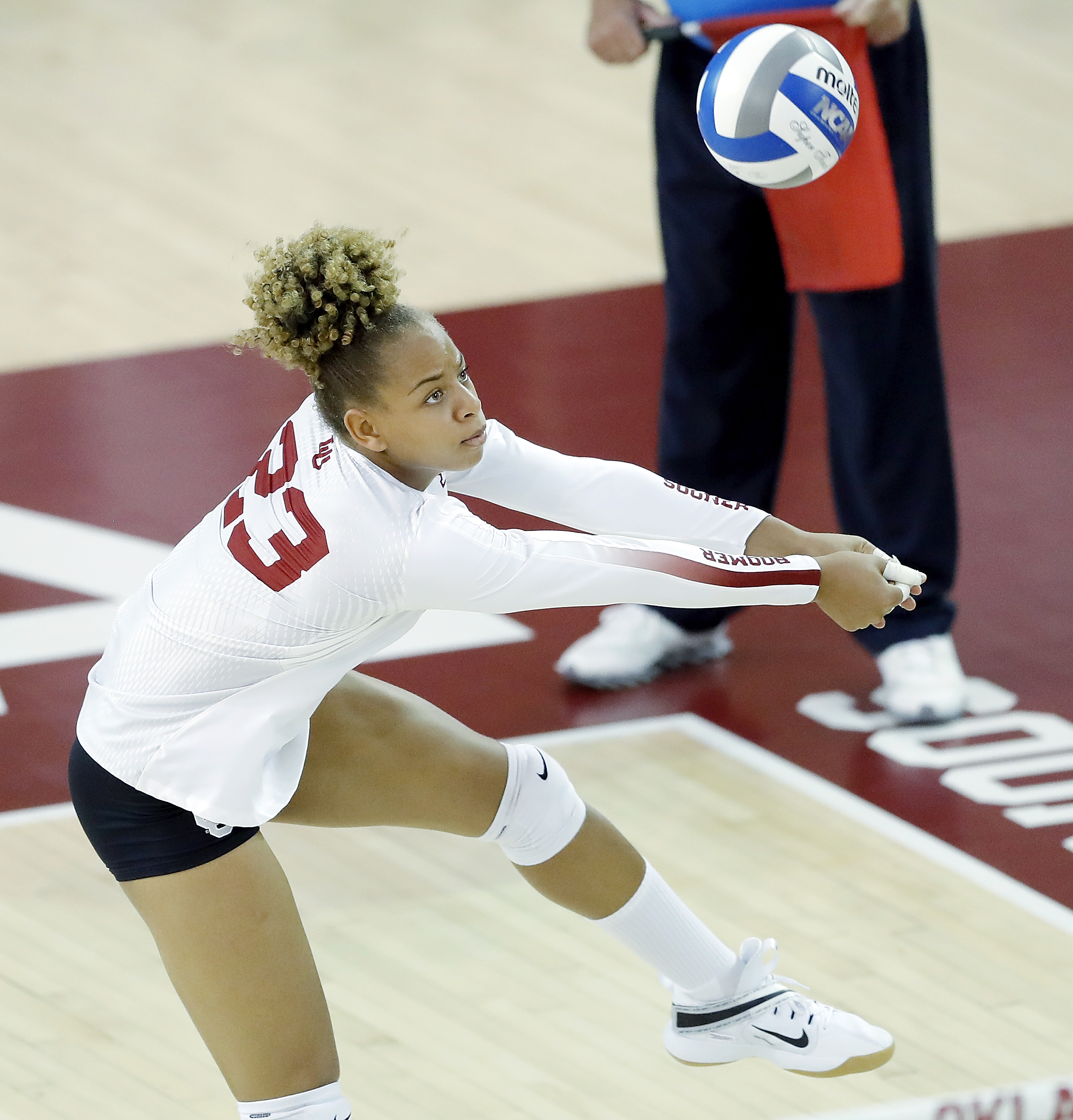
Guewe Diouf

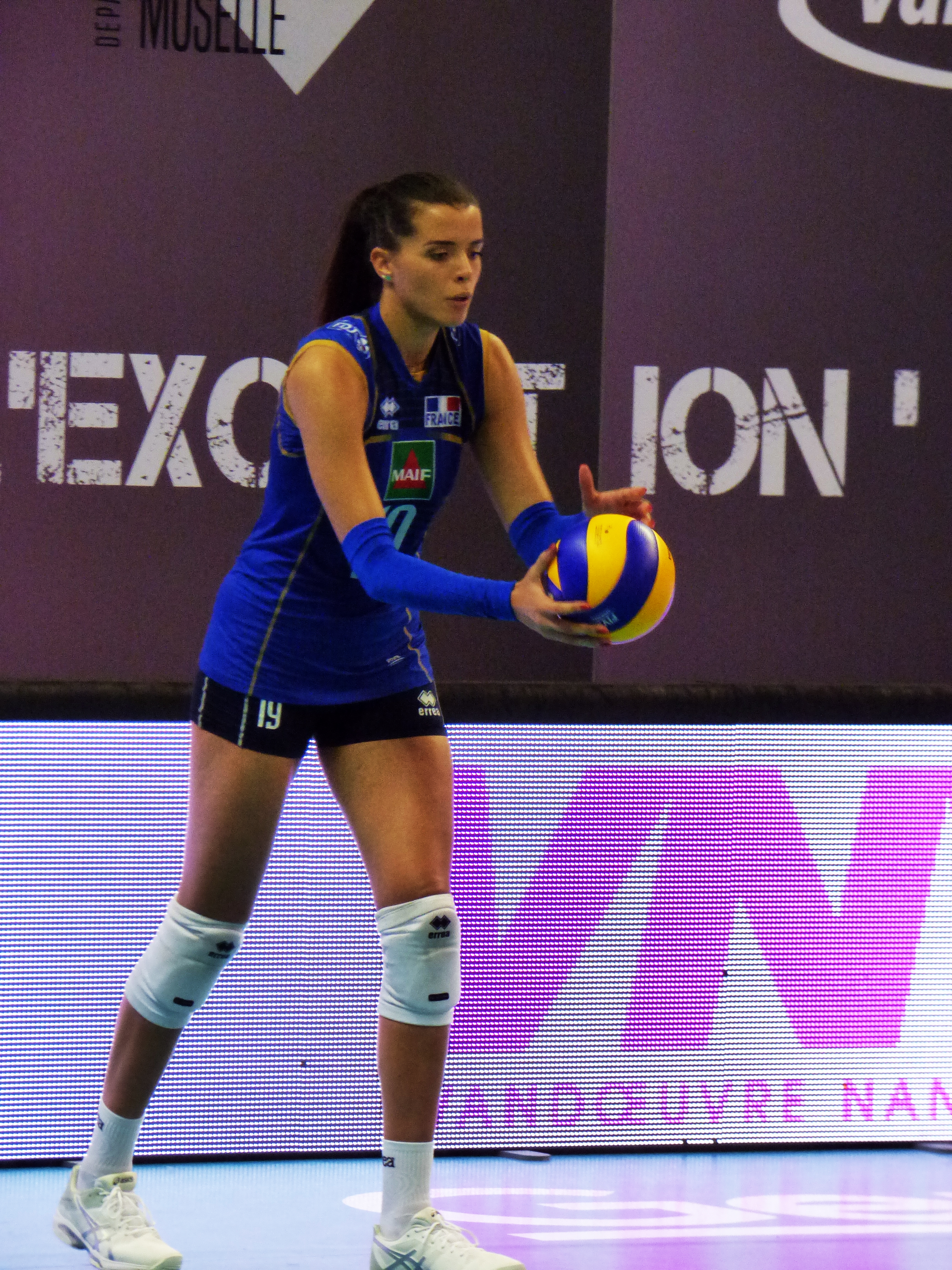
Julie Oliveira Souza

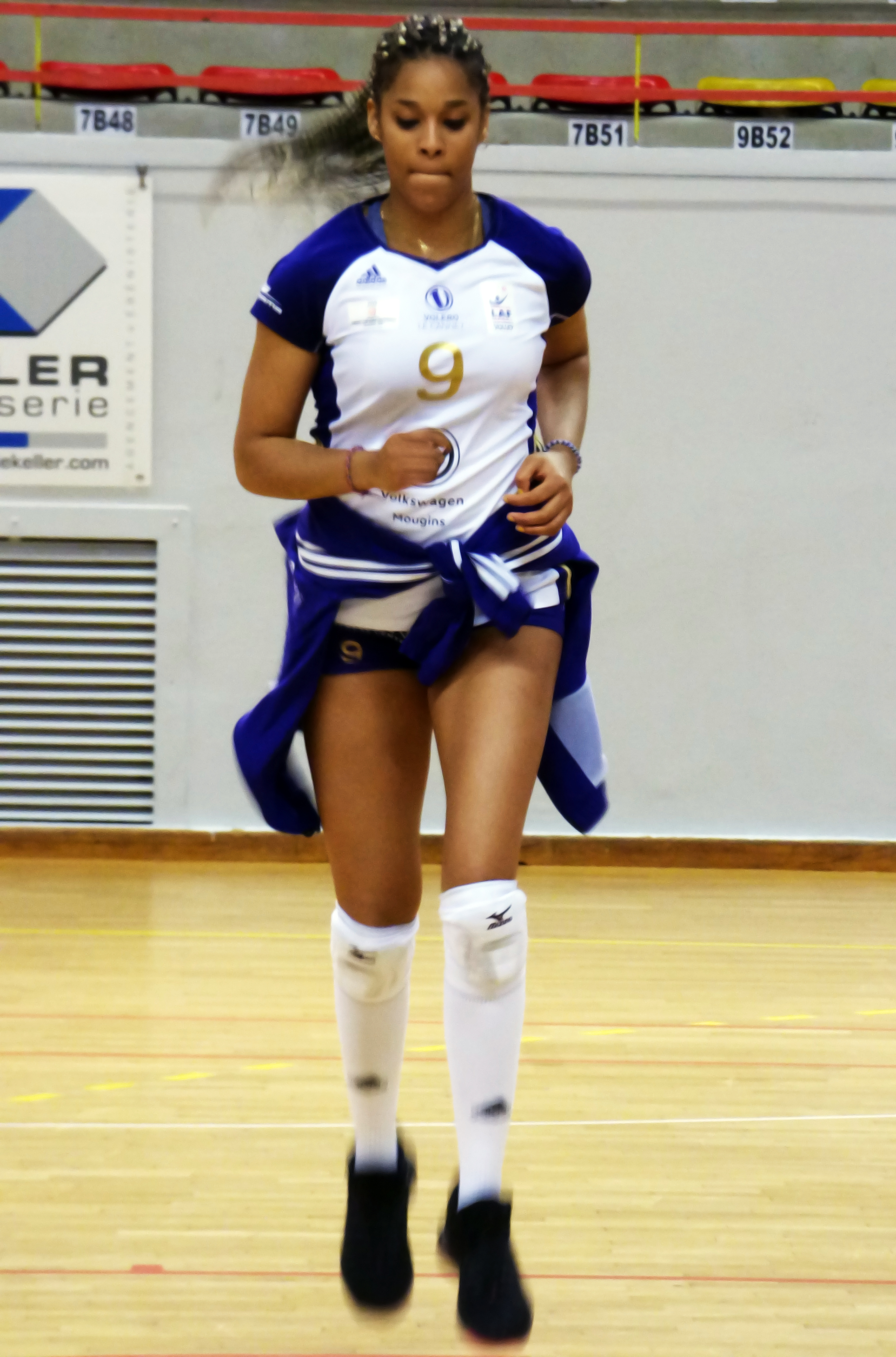
Liset Herrera

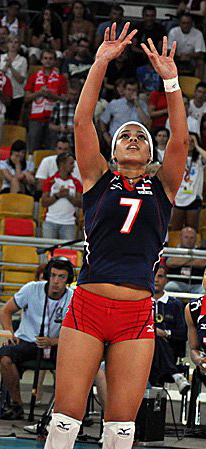
Niverka Marte

Greece

- (Greece) Anna Kavatha
- (Greece) Aliki Konstantinidou
- (Greece) Sofia Kosma
- (Greece) Vasiliki Nikouli
- (Greece) Maria Lamprinidou
- (Greece) Ourania Gkouzou
- (Greece) Eleni Memetzi
- (Greece) Katerina Vasilaki
- (Greece) Dimitra Giakoumi
- (Greece) Zenia Tsima
- (Greece) Nikoleta Koutouxidou
- (Greece) Georgia Tzanakaki
- (Greece) Athina Dilaveri
- (Greece) Pola Kitsou
- (Greece) Athanasia Totsidou
- (Greece) Panagiota Rogka
- (Greece) Fenia Papageorgiou
- (Greece) Athina Papafotiou
- (Greece) Dimitra Siori
- (Greece) Izabel Ivanova
- (Greece) Marina Kalaitzieva
- (Greece) Eva Chantava

Rest of Europe

- (Belgium) Ilka Van de Vyver
- (Bosnia and Herzegovina) Marijana Bašić
- (Bulgaria) Miroslava Paskova
- (Bulgaria) Merelin Nikolova
- (Bulgaria) Kremena Trifonova
- (Czech Republic) Veronika Trnková
- (Czech Republic) Kateřina Valková
- (France) Jade Cholet
- (France) Julie Oliveira Souza
- (France) Guewe Diouf
- (Hungary) Valeria Hejjas
- (Hungary) Katalin Kiss
- (Italy) Giulia Melli
- (Italy) Terry Enweonwu
- (Latvia) Karina Filipjonoka
- (Montenegro) Nikoleta Perović
- (Poland) Aleksandra Kruk
- (Romania) Ariana Pirv
- (Romania) Lia Mitsi
- (Romania) Adriana-Maria Matei
- (Serbia) Bojana Doganjić
- (Serbia) Jelena Jošović
- (Serbia) Marijana Bašić
- (Serbia) Jovana Ćirković
- (Serbia) Sara Carić
- (Serbia) Dragana Brković
- (Serbia) Nataša Ševarika
- (Serbia) Sara Sakradžija
- (Serbia) Jelena Delić
- (Slovenia) Sonja Borovinšek
- (Spain) Marisa Fernández
- (Ukraine) Yuliia Kovtun
- (Ukraine) Helena Gkortsaniouk

Americas

- (Argentina) Yamila Nizetich
- (Brazil) Mari Mendes
- (Cuba) Liset Herrera
- (Cuba) Gyselle Silva
- (Cuba) Rosir Calderón
- (Dominican Republic) Niverka Marte
- (Trinidad and Tobago) Darlene Ramdin
- (United States) Breana Edwards
- (United States) Malina Terrell
- (United States) Lindsey Vander Weide
- (United States) Norene Iosia
- (United States) Zoe Weatherington
- (United States) Tristin Savage
- (United States) Sydni Schetnan

Asia

- (Japan) Aki Momii
- (Japan) Ai Kurogo
- (Russia) Tatiana Kulikova
- (Turkey) Aybüke Özdemir
- (Turkey) Tutku Burcu Yüzgenç

== Notable former and current coaches ==
Greece

- Ioannis Paganelis (2002–03, 2005–06)
- George Samaras (2006–07, 2009–11, 2016, 2017–18)
- Iraklis Doriadis (2007, 2008–09)
- Andreas Geronikos (2008)
- Apostolos Oikonomou (2011–13)
- Manolis Roumeliotis (2014–16)
- Dimos Filippatos (2017)
- Eleni Memetzi (2018)
- Manolis Apostolοgiorgakis (2019, 2020)
- Giorgos Bakodimos (2020)
- Kostas Arseniadis (2020–22, 2023)
- Vasilis Pandis (2025)
- Konstantinos Tambouratzis (2026–)

Rest of Europe

- Pasqualino Giangrossi (2024)
- Branko Gajić (2024–25)

Asia

- Yunus Öçal (2022–24)
- Dehri Can Dehrioğlu (2025)

== Sponsorships ==
- Great Sponsor: Escape Car Rentals
- Official Sport Clothing Manufacturer: Macron
- Official Broadcaster: ERT

== See also ==
- AEK Men's Volleyball Club
