= 2024–25 CEV Women's Challenge Cup =

Volleyball club tournament

CEV Women's Challenge Cup
- 2024–25

Tournament information
- Sport: Volleyball
- Dates: October 2024–March 2025
- Website: Women's Challenge Cup

Final positions
- Champions: (Italy) Roma Volley Club
- Runner-up: (Italy) Reale Mutua Fenera Chieri'76

The 2024–25 CEV Women's Challenge Cup was the 45th edition of the European Challenge Cup volleyball club tournament.

== Format ==
Qualification round (Home and away matches):

- 32nd finals

Main phase (Home and away matches):

- 16th finals → 8th finals → Quarter-finals

Final phase (Home and away matches):

- Semi-finals → Finals

Aggregate score is counted as follows: 3 points for 3–0 or 3–1 win, 2 points for 3–2 win, 1 point for 2–3 loss.
In case the teams are tied after two legs, a Golden Set is played immediately at the completion of the second leg.

== Teams ==
| Rankings | Country | Number of teams | Teams |
|---|---|---|---|
| 1 | Austria | 2 | Kelag Wildcats Klagenfurt |
| 1 | Austria | 2 | VB Niederösterreich Sokol/Post |
| 2 | Belgium | 1 | E.S. Charleroi Volley |
| 3 | Bosnia and Herzegovina | 1 | Bimal Jedinstvo Brčko |
| 4 | Bulgaria | 2 | CSKA Sofia |
| 4 | Bulgaria | 2 | Levski Sofia |
| 5 | Croatia | 2 | Kelteks Karlovac |
| 5 | Croatia | 2 | Marina Kaštela |
| 6 | Cyprus | 1 | Olympiada Neapolis Nicosia |
| 7 | Czech Republic | 3 | VK Šelmy Brno |
| 7 | Czech Republic | 3 | TJ Ostrava |
| 7 | Czech Republic | 3 | Olymp Praha |
| 8 | Denmark | 1 | Holte IF |
| 9 | Faroe Islands | 1 | Fleyr Tórshavn |
| 10 | Finland | 2 | LP Kangasala |
| 10 | Finland | 2 | Pölkky Kuusamo |
| 11 | Germany | 2 | SC Potsdam |
| 11 | Germany | 2 | VC Wiesbaden |
| 12 | Greece | 5 | AEK Athens |
| 12 | Greece | 5 | Panathinaikos |
| 12 | Greece | 5 | Olympiacos SFP Piraeus |
| 12 | Greece | 5 | AO Thiras |
| 12 | Greece | 5 | ASP Thetis |
| 13 | Hungary | 1 | MÁV Előre SC Székesfehérvár |
| 14 | Italy | 1 | Reale Mutua Fenera Chieri'76 |
| 15 | Israel | 2 | Hapoel Kfar Saba |
| 15 | Israel | 2 | Maccabi Haifa Carmel |
| 16 | Latvia | 1 | RSU/MSG Riga |
| 17 | Lithuania | 1 | TK Kaunas VDU |
| 18 | Netherlands | 3 | Djopzz Zwolle |
| 18 | Netherlands | 3 | Friso Sneek |
| 18 | Netherlands | 3 | Apollo 8 Borne |
| 19 | Norway | 1 | Randaberg IL |
| 20 | Portugal | 2 | Sport Lisboa e Benfica |
| 20 | Portugal | 2 | Sporting CP Lisboa |
| 21 | Romania | 3 | Rapid Bucuresti |
| 21 | Romania | 3 | CSM Lugoj |
| 21 | Romania | 3 | CSM Târgoviște |
| 22 | Serbia | 1 | ŽOK Ub |
| 23 | Slovakia | 2 | VKP Bratislava |
| 23 | Slovakia | 2 | VP UKF Nistra |
| 24 | Slovenia | 1 | GEN-I Volley Nova Gorica |
| 25 | Spain | 2 | DSV CV Sant Cugat |
| 25 | Spain | 2 | Fundación Unicaja Andalucía |
| 26 | Switzerland | 4 | Sm' Aesch |
| 26 | Switzerland | 4 | Kanti Schaffhausen |
| 26 | Switzerland | 4 | Infomaniak Geneve Volley |
| 26 | Switzerland | 4 | Volley Düdingen |
| 27 | Balkan Cup Winner | 1 | (Turkey) Galatasaray Daikin |
| 28 | WEVZA Cup Winner | 1 | (Italy) Roma Volley Club |

== Draw ==
The draw was held on 16 July 2024 in Luxembourg.

== 32nd finals ==
| Team 1 | Agg. | Team 2 | 1st leg | 2nd leg | Golden Set |
|---|---|---|---|---|---|
| VK Šelmy Brno (Czech Republic) | 0–6 | (Romania) CSM Lugoj | 0–3 | 0–3 | |
| AEK Athens (Greece) | 6–0 | (Latvia) RSU/MSG Riga | 3–1 | 3–1 | |
| Kelag Wildcats Klagenfurt (Austria) | 3–3 | (Finland) LP Kangasala | 3–2 | 2–3 | 12–15 |
| Galatasaray Daikin (Turkey) | 6–0 | (Greece) AO Thiras | 3–0 | 3–0 | |
| Panathinaikos (Greece) | 6–0 | (Bulgaria) CSKA Sofia | 3–0 | 3–1 | |
| CSM Târgoviște (Romania) | 6–0 | (Czech Republic) TJ Ostrava | 3–1 | 3–1 | |
| Pölkky Kuusamo (Finland) | 0–6 | (Netherlands) Apollo 8 Borne | 0–3 | 0–3 | |
| Sm' Aesch (Switzerland) | 6–0 | (Bosnia and Herzegovina) Bimal Jedinstvo Brčko | 3–0 | 3–1 | |
| Olympiada Neapolis Nicosia (Cyprus) | 3–3 | (Israel) Hapoel Kfar Saba | 1–3 | 3–0 | 15–5 |
| Friso Sneek (Netherlands) | 6–0 | (Faroe Islands) Fleyr Tórshavn | 3–0 | 3–0 | |
| Infomaniak Geneve Volley (Switzerland) | 0–6 | (Spain) DSV CV Sant Cugat | 0–3 | 1–3 | |
| Kanti Schaffhausen (Switzerland) | 5–1 | (Denmark) Holte IF | 3–2 | 3–1 | |
| VKP Bratislava (Slovakia) | 0–6 | (Germany) SC Potsdam | 0–3 | 0–3 | |
| Levski Sofia (Bulgaria) | 5–1 | (Slovakia) VP UKF Nistra | 3–0 | 3–2 | |
| Olympiacos SFP Piraeus (Greece) | 6–0 | (Norway) Randaberg IL | 3–0 | 3–0 | |
| Djopzz Zwolle (Netherlands) | 5–1 | (Lithuania) TK Kaunas VDU | 3–0 | 3–2 | |
| Roma Volley Club (Italy) | 6–0 | (Croatia) Kelteks Karlovac | 3–0 | 3–0 | |

=== Matches ===
All times are local.

| Date | Time | | Score | | Set 1 | Set 2 | Set 3 | Set 4 | Set 5 | Total | Report |
First leg
| 8 Oct | 18:00 | AEK Athens (Greece) | 3–1 | (Latvia) RSU/MSG Riga | 25–15 | 25–14 | 19–25 | 25–20 | | 94–74 | P2 Report |
| 8 Oct | 18:00 | VK Šelmy Brno (Czech Republic) | 0–3 | (Romania) CSM Lugoj | 23–25 | 12–25 | 21–25 | | | 56–75 | P2 Report |
| 8 Oct | 20:00 | Galatasaray Daikin (Turkey) | 3–0 | (Greece) AO Thiras | 25–14 | 25–20 | 25–16 | | | 75–50 | P2 Report |
| 8 Oct | 19:00 | Kelag Wildcats Klagenfurt (Austria) | 3–2 | (Finland) LP Kangasala | 25–22 | 17–25 | 17–25 | 25–21 | 15–10 | 99–103 | P2 Report |
| 9 Oct | 17:00 | Panathinaikos (Greece) | 3–0 | (Bulgaria) CSKA Sofia | 25–7 | 25–16 | 25–16 | | | 75–39 | P2 Report |
| 9 Oct | 18:00 | CSM Târgoviște (Romania) | 3–1 | (Czech Republic) TJ Ostrava | 25–23 | 25–20 | 22–25 | 25–22 | | 97–90 | P2 Report |
| 9 Oct | 18:30 | Pölkky Kuusamo (Finland) | 0–3 | (Netherlands) Apollo 8 Borne | 22–25 | 23–25 | 25–27 | | | 70–77 | P2 Report |
| 9 Oct | 18:00 | Roma Volley Club (Italy) | 3–0 | (Croatia) Kelteks Karlovac | 25–9 | 25–14 | 25–16 | | | 75–39 | P2 Report |
| 9 Oct | 19:30 | Olympiada Neapolis Nicosia (Cyprus) | 1–3 | (Israel) Hapoel Kfar Saba | 20–25 | 19–25 | 25–14 | 24–26 | | 88–90 | P2 Report |
| 9 Oct | 20:00 | Levski Sofia (Bulgaria) | 3–0 | (Slovakia) VP UKF Nistra | 25–12 | 25–12 | 25–14 | | | 75–38 | P2 Report |
| 9 Oct | 19:30 | Sm' Aesch (Switzerland) | 3–0 | (Bosnia and Herzegovina) Bimal Jedinstvo Brčko | 25–17 | 25–17 | 25–16 | | | 75–50 | P2 Report |
| 9 Oct | 20:00 | Friso Sneek (Netherlands) | 3–0 | (Faroe Islands) Fleyr Tórshavn | 25–9 | 25–17 | 25–17 | | | 75–43 | P2 |
| 9 Oct | 20:00 | Infomaniak Geneve Volley (Switzerland) | 0–3 | (Spain) DSV CV Sant Cugat | 17–25 | 13–25 | 20–25 | | | 50–75 | P2 Report |
| 9 Oct | 20:00 | Kanti Schaffhausen (Switzerland) | 3–2 | (Denmark) Holte IF | 15–25 | 25–16 | 23–25 | 25–16 | 15–7 | 103–89 | P2 Report |
| 9 Oct | 20:00 | VKP Bratislava (Slovakia) | 0–3 | (Germany) SC Potsdam | 21–25 | 20–25 | 17–25 | | | 58–75 | P2 Report |
| 10 Oct | 19:00 | Olympiacos SFP Piraeus (Greece) | 3–0 | (Norway) Randaberg IL | 25–14 | 25–20 | 25–18 | | | 75–52 | P2 Report |
| 16 Oct | 15:30 | Djopzz Zwolle (Netherlands) | 3–0 | (Lithuania) TK Kaunas VDU | 25–18 | 25–10 | 25–20 | | | 75–48 | P2 Report |
Second leg
| 10 Oct | 19:30 | Hapoel Kfar Saba (Israel) | 0–3 | (Cyprus) Olympiada Neapolis Nicosia | 13–25 | 15–25 | 16–25 | | | 44–75 | P2 Report |
| Golden set | | Hapoel Kfar Saba (Israel) | 5–15 | (Cyprus) Olympiada Neapolis Nicosia | | | | | | | |
| 15 Oct | 19:00 | AO Thiras (Greece) | 0–3 | (Turkey) Galatasaray Daikin | 14–25 | 11–25 | 17–25 | | | 42–75 | P2 Report |
| 15 Oct | 19:00 | Fleyr Tórshavn (Faroe Islands) | 0–3 | (Netherlands) Friso Sneek | 16–25 | 19–25 | 15–25 | | | 50–75 | P2 Report |
| 15 Oct | 19:00 | Holte IF (Denmark) | 1–3 | (Switzerland) Kanti Schaffhausen | 19–25 | 25–21 | 18–25 | 23–25 | | 85–96 | P2 Report |
| 16 Oct | 16:30 | TJ Ostrava (Czech Republic) | 1–3 | (Romania) CSM Târgoviște | 28–26 | 13–25 | 22–25 | 20–25 | | 83–101 | P2 Report |
| 16 Oct | 18:00 | CSKA Sofia (Bulgaria) | 1–3 | (Greece) Panathinaikos | 12–25 | 20–25 | 27–25 | 16–25 | | 75–100 | P2 Report |
| 16 Oct | 18:30 | CSM Lugoj (Romania) | 3–0 | (Czech Republic) VK Šelmy Brno | 25–13 | 25–19 | 25–13 | | | 75–45 | P2 Report |
| 16 Oct | 18:00 | VP UKF Nistra (Slovakia) | 2–3 | (Bulgaria) Levski Sofia | 19–25 | 12–25 | 26–24 | 25–17 | 14–16 | 96–107 | P2 Report |
| 16 Oct | 18:00 | Kelteks Karlovac (Croatia) | 0–3 | (Italy) Roma Volley Club | 17–25 | 18–25 | 9–25 | | | 44–75 | P2 Report |
| 16 Oct | 19:00 | RSU/MSG Riga (Latvia) | 1–3 | (Greece) AEK Athens | 25–20 | 22–25 | 14–25 | 12–25 | | 73–95 | P2 Report |
| 16 Oct | 19:00 | Randaberg IL (Norway) | 0–3 | (Greece) Olympiacos SFP Piraeus | 15–25 | 8–25 | 13–25 | | | 36–75 | P2 Report |
| 16 Oct | 19:00 | Bimal Jedinstvo Brčko (Bosnia and Herzegovina) | 1–3 | (Switzerland) Sm' Aesch | 15–25 | 10–25 | 26–24 | 19–25 | | 70–99 | P2 Report |
| 16 Oct | 19:00 | SC Potsdam (Germany) | 3–0 | (Slovakia) VKP Bratislava | 25–11 | 25–20 | 25–20 | | | 75–51 | P2 Report |
| 16 Oct | 20:00 | DSV CV Sant Cugat (Spain) | 3–1 | (Switzerland) Infomaniak Geneve Volley | 18–25 | 25–11 | 25–16 | 25–21 | | 93–73 | P2 Report |
| 16 Oct | 20:00 | Apollo 8 Borne (Netherlands) | 3–0 | (Finland) Pölkky Kuusamo | 25–18 | 25–22 | 25–20 | | | 75–60 | P2 Report |
| 17 Oct | 18:30 | LP Kangasala (Finland) | 3–2 | (Austria) Kelag Wildcats Klagenfurt | 25–22 | 23–25 | 13–25 | 25–16 | 15–12 | 101–100 | P2 Report |
| Golden set | | LP Kangasala (Finland) | 15–12 | (Austria) Kelag Wildcats Klagenfurt | | | | | | | |
| 17 Oct | 20:00 | TK Kaunas VDU (Lithuania) | 2–3 | (Netherlands) Djopzz Zwolle | 25–27 | 14–25 | 25–23 | 25–17 | 7–15 | 96–107 | P2 Report |

== 16th finals ==
| Team 1 | Agg. | Team 2 | 1st leg | 2nd leg | Golden Set |
|---|---|---|---|---|---|
| Galatasaray Daikin (Turkey) | 6–0 | (Germany) VC Wiesbaden | 3–0 | 3–1 | |
| CSM Târgoviște (Romania) | 6–0 | (Czech Republic) Olymp Praha | 3–1 | 3–0 | |
| Panathinaikos (Greece) | 3–3 | (Spain) Fundación Unicaja Andalucía | 3–0 | 1–3 | 6–15 |
| CSM Lugoj (Romania) | 6–0 | (Hungary) MÁV Előre SC Székesfehérvár | 3–1 | 3–1 | |
| Olympiacos SFP Piraeus (Greece) | 6–0 | (Croatia) Marina Kaštela | 3–0 | 3–0 | |
| AEK Athens (Greece) | 0–6 | (Portugal) Sporting CP Lisboa | 1–3 | 0–3 | |
| SC Potsdam (Germany) | 4–2 | (Serbia) ŽOK Ub | 3–0 | 2–3 | |
| Sm' Aesch (Switzerland) | 4–2 | (Austria) VB Niederösterreich Sokol/Post | 3–0 | 2–3 | |
| Friso Sneek (Netherlands) | 1–5 | (Greece) ASP Thetis | 1–3 | 2–3 | |
| Kanti Schaffhausen (Switzerland) | 3–3 | (Switzerland) Volley Düdingen | 3–1 | 1–3 | 6–15 |
| Olympiada Neapolis Nicosia (Cyprus) | 2–4 | (Belgium) E.S. Charleroi Volley | 3–2 | 0–3 | |
| Apollo 8 Borne (Netherlands) | 1–5 | (Bulgaria) Levski Sofia | 2–3 | 0–3 | |
| Roma Volley Club (Italy) | 6–0 | (Romania) Rapid Bucuresti | 3–0 | 3–0 | |
| Djopzz Zwolle (Netherlands) | 3–3 | (Slovenia) GEN-I Volley Nova Gorica | 3–1 | 0–3 | 10–15 |
| DSV CV Sant Cugat (Spain) | 0–6 | (Italy) Reale Mutua Fenera Chieri'76 | 0–3 | 0–3 | |
| LP Kangasala (Finland) | 6–0 | (Israel) Maccabi Haifa Carmel | 3–0 | 3–0 | |

=== Matches ===
All times are local.

| Date | Time | | Score | | Set 1 | Set 2 | Set 3 | Set 4 | Set 5 | Total | Report |
First leg
| 5 Nov | 19:30 | Galatasaray Daikin (Turkey) | 3–0 | (Germany) VC Wiesbaden | 25–22 | 25–17 | 25–14 | | | 75–53 | P2 Report |
| 6 Nov | 18:00 | CSM Târgoviște (Romania) | 3–1 | (Czech Republic) Olymp Praha | 25–18 | 23–25 | 25–18 | 27–25 | | 100–86 | P2 Report |
| 6 Nov | 18:00 | Panathinaikos (Greece) | 3–0 | (Spain) Fundación Unicaja Andalucía | 25–19 | 25–13 | 25–22 | | | 75–54 | P2 Report |
| 6 Nov | 18:30 | CSM Lugoj (Romania) | 3–1 | (Hungary) MÁV Előre SC Székesfehérvár | 23–25 | 25–15 | 25–21 | 25–16 | | 98–77 | P2 Report |
| 6 Nov | 19:00 | Olympiacos SFP Piraeus (Greece) | 3–0 | (Croatia) Marina Kaštela | 25–19 | 25–21 | 25–7 | | | 75–47 | P2 Report |
| 6 Nov | 19:00 | AEK Athens (Greece) | 1–3 | (Portugal) Sporting CP Lisboa | 17–25 | 11–25 | 25–21 | 19–25 | | 72–96 | P2 Report |
| 6 Nov | 20:00 | Olympiada Neapolis Nicosia (Cyprus) | 3–2 | (Belgium) E.S. Charleroi Volley | 12–25 | 22–25 | 25–12 | 25–18 | 17–15 | 101–95 | P2 Report |
| 6 Nov | 19:00 | SC Potsdam (Germany) | 3–0 | (Serbia) ŽOK Ub | 25–21 | 25–18 | 25–23 | | | 75–62 | P2 Report |
| 6 Nov | 19:30 | Sm' Aesch (Switzerland) | 3–0 | (Austria) VB Niederösterreich Sokol/Post | 25–18 | 25–13 | 25–22 | | | 75–53 | P2 Report |
| 6 Nov | 20:00 | Friso Sneek (Netherlands) | 1–3 | (Greece) ASP Thetis | 20–25 | 18–25 | 25–17 | 23–25 | | 86–92 | P2 Report |
| 6 Nov | 20:00 | DSV CV Sant Cugat (Spain) | 0–3 | (Italy) Reale Mutua Fenera Chieri'76 | 17–25 | 21–25 | 10–25 | | | 48–75 | P2 Report |
| 6 Nov | 20:00 | Kanti Schaffhausen (Switzerland) | 3–1 | (Switzerland) Volley Düdingen | 25–23 | 19–25 | 25–22 | 25–15 | | 94–85 | P2 Report |
| 6 Nov | 20:00 | Apollo 8 Borne (Netherlands) | 2–3 | (Bulgaria) Levski Sofia | 17–25 | 25–22 | 22–25 | 25–20 | 12–15 | 101–107 | P2 Report |
| 7 Nov | 19:00 | Djopzz Zwolle (Netherlands) | 3–1 | (Slovenia) GEN-I Volley Nova Gorica | 25–23 | 20–25 | 30–28 | 26–24 | | 101–100 | P2 Report |
| 7 Nov | 20:00 | Roma Volley Club (Italy) | 3–0 | (Romania) Rapid Bucuresti | 25–14 | 25–17 | 25–21 | | | 75–52 | P2 Report |
| 12 Nov | 18:30 | LP Kangasala (Finland) | 3–0 | (Israel) Maccabi Haifa Carmel | 25–17 | 25–18 | 25–20 | | | 75–55 | P2 Report |
Second leg
| 12 Nov | 18:00 | Rapid Bucuresti (Romania) | 0–3 | (Italy) Roma Volley Club | 19–25 | 17–25 | 18–25 | | | 54–75 | P2 Report |
| 12 Nov | 19:00 | MÁV Előre SC Székesfehérvár (Hungary) | 1–3 | (Romania) CSM Lugoj | 23–25 | 25–15 | 21–25 | 16–25 | | 85–90 | P2 Report |
| 12 Nov | 20:00 | E.S. Charleroi Volley (Belgium) | 3–0 | (Cyprus) Olympiada Neapolis Nicosia | 25–22 | 25–16 | 25–23 | | | 75–61 | P2 |
| 13 Nov | 18:00 | Marina Kaštela (Croatia) | 0–3 | (Greece) Olympiacos SFP Piraeus | 17–25 | 11–25 | 7–25 | | | 35–75 | P2 Report |
| 13 Nov | 18:00 | Olymp Praha (Czech Republic) | 0–3 | (Romania) CSM Târgoviște | 24–26 | 22–25 | 12–25 | | | 58–76 | P2 Report |
| 13 Nov | 19:00 | Levski Sofia (Bulgaria) | 3–0 | (Netherlands) Apollo 8 Borne | 25–21 | 25–21 | 25–16 | | | 75–58 | P2 Report |
| 13 Nov | 19:00 | VB Niederösterreich Sokol/Post (Austria) | 3–2 | (Switzerland) Sm' Aesch | 23–25 | 25–23 | 6–25 | 27–25 | 15–10 | 96–108 | P2 |
| 13 Nov | 19:00 | ŽOK Ub (Serbia) | 3–2 | (Germany) SC Potsdam | 24–26 | 25–23 | 19–25 | 25–19 | 15–13 | 108–106 | P2 Report |
| 13 Nov | 19:00 | GEN-I Volley Nova Gorica (Slovenia) | 3–0 | (Netherlands) Djopzz Zwolle | 25–20 | 25–21 | 25–14 | | | 75–55 | P2 Report |
| Golden set | | GEN-I Volley Nova Gorica (Slovenia) | 15–10 | (Netherlands) Djopzz Zwolle | | | | | | | |
| 13 Nov | 19:30 | Fundación Unicaja Andalucía (Spain) | 3–1 | (Greece) Panathinaikos | 25–21 | 18–25 | 25–20 | 25–17 | | 93–83 | P2 Report |
| Golden set | | Fundación Unicaja Andalucía (Spain) | 15–6 | (Greece) Panathinaikos | | | | | | | |
| 13 Nov | 20:00 | Reale Mutua Fenera Chieri'76 (Italy) | 3–0 | (Spain) DSV CV Sant Cugat | 25–9 | 25–22 | 25–23 | | | 75–54 | P2 Report |
| 13 Nov | 20:00 | Volley Düdingen (Switzerland) | 3–1 | (Switzerland) Kanti Schaffhausen | 17–25 | 33–31 | 25–22 | 25–20 | | 100–98 | P2 Report |
| Golden set | | Volley Düdingen (Switzerland) | 15–6 | (Switzerland) Kanti Schaffhausen | | | | | | | |
| 14 Nov | 18:30 | Maccabi Haifa Carmel (Israel) | 0–3 | (Finland) LP Kangasala | 15–25 | 12–25 | 13–25 | | | 40–75 | P2 Report |
| 14 Nov | 20:00 | ASP Thetis (Greece) | 3–2 | (Netherlands) Friso Sneek | 25–20 | 21–25 | 25–22 | 23–25 | 15–10 | 109–102 | P2 Report |
| 14 Nov | 19:30 | VC Wiesbaden (Germany) | 1–3 | (Turkey) Galatasaray Daikin | 15–25 | 15–25 | 25–17 | 20–25 | | 75–92 | P2 Report |
| 14 Nov | 20:00 | Sporting CP Lisboa (Portugal) | 3–0 | (Greece) AEK Athens | 25–19 | 25–19 | 25–13 | | | 75–51 | P2 Report |

== 8th finals ==
| Team 1 | Agg. | Team 2 | 1st leg | 2nd leg |
|---|---|---|---|---|
| Olympiacos SFP Piraeus (Greece) | 4–2 | (Romania) CSM Lugoj | 3–0 | 2–3 |
| GEN-I Volley Nova Gorica (Slovenia) | 1–5 | (Romania) CSM Târgoviște | 2–3 | 0–3 |
| Levski Sofia (Bulgaria) | 0–6 | (Italy) Roma Volley Club | 1–3 | 0–3 |
| Sm' Aesch (Switzerland) | 0–6 | (Turkey) Galatasaray Daikin | 0–3 | 0–3 |
| Volley Düdingen (Switzerland) | 0–6 | (Germany) SC Potsdam | 0–3 | 0–3 |
| Reale Mutua Fenera Chieri'76 (Italy) | 6–0 | (Finland) LP Kangasala | 3–0 | 3–0 |
| E.S. Charleroi Volley (Belgium) | 6–0 | (Spain) Fundación Unicaja Andalucía | 3–0 | 3–1 |
| ASP Thetis (Greece) | 0–6 | (Portugal) Sporting CP Lisboa | 0–3 | 1–3 |

=== Matches ===
All times are local.

| Date | Time | | Score | | Set 1 | Set 2 | Set 3 | Set 4 | Set 5 | Total | Report |
First leg
| 26 Nov | 19:00 | Olympiacos SFP Piraeus (Greece) | 3–0 | (Romania) CSM Lugoj | 25–15 | 25–21 | 25–20 | | | 75–56 | P2 Report |
| 27 Nov | 19:00 | Levski Sofia (Bulgaria) | 1–3 | (Italy) Roma Volley Club | 19–25 | 25–23 | 23–25 | 20–25 | | 87–98 | P2 Report |
| 27 Nov | 19:00 | GEN-I Volley Nova Gorica (Slovenia) | 2–3 | (Romania) CSM Târgoviște | 25–18 | 23–25 | 15–25 | 26–24 | 15–17 | 104–109 | P2 Report |
| 27 Nov | 19:30 | Sm' Aesch (Switzerland) | 0–3 | (Turkey) Galatasaray Daikin | 18–25 | 13–25 | 17–25 | | | 48–75 | P2 Report |
| 27 Nov | 19:30 | Volley Düdingen (Switzerland) | 0–3 | (Germany) SC Potsdam | 21–25 | 9–25 | 13–25 | | | 43–75 | P2 Report |
| 27 Nov | 20:00 | Reale Mutua Fenera Chieri'76 (Italy) | 3–0 | (Finland) LP Kangasala | 25–19 | 25–21 | 25–15 | | | 75–55 | P2 Report |
| 28 Nov | 20:30 | ASP Thetis (Greece) | 0–3 | (Portugal) Sporting CP Lisboa | 20–25 | 19–25 | 25–27 | | | 64–77 | P2 Report |
| 27 Nov | 20:00 | E.S. Charleroi Volley (Belgium) | 3–0 | (Spain) Fundación Unicaja Andalucía | 25–16 | 25–21 | 25–17 | | | 75–54 | P2 Report |
Second leg
| 11 Dec | 18:00 | CSM Târgoviște (Romania) | 3–0 | (Slovenia) GEN-I Volley Nova Gorica | 25–21 | 25–21 | 25–15 | | | 75–57 | P2 Report |
| 11 Dec | 18:30 | CSM Lugoj (Romania) | 3–2 | (Greece) Olympiacos SFP Piraeus | 25–16 | 21–25 | 25–20 | 15–25 | 15–11 | 101–97 | P2 Report |
| 11 Dec | 18:30 | LP Kangasala (Finland) | 0–3 | (Italy) Reale Mutua Fenera Chieri'76 | 14–25 | 18–25 | 15–25 | | | 47–75 | P2 Report |
| 11 Dec | 18:00 | Sporting CP Lisboa (Portugal) | 3–1 | (Greece) ASP Thetis | 19–25 | 25–18 | 27–25 | 25–20 | | 96–88 | P2 Report |
| 11 Dec | 19:30 | Fundación Unicaja Andalucía (Spain) | 1–3 | (Belgium) E.S. Charleroi Volley | 22–25 | 26–28 | 25–7 | 16–25 | | 89–85 | P2 Report |
| 11 Dec | 20:00 | Roma Volley Club (Italy) | 3–0 | (Bulgaria) Levski Sofia | 25–18 | 25–12 | 25–12 | | | 75–42 | P2 Report |
| 12 Dec | 19:30 | Galatasaray Daikin (Turkey) | 3–0 | (Switzerland) Sm' Aesch | 25–9 | 25–12 | 25–18 | | | 75–39 | P2 Report |
| 12 Dec | 19:00 | SC Potsdam (Germany) | 3–0 | (Switzerland) Volley Düdingen | 25–18 | 25–21 | 25–19 | | | 75–58 | P2 Report |

== Quarter-finals ==
| Team 1 | Agg. | Team 2 | 1st leg | 2nd leg |
|---|---|---|---|---|
| E.S. Charleroi Volley (Belgium) | 0–6 | (Italy) Roma Volley Club | 0–3 | 1–3 |
| Sporting CP Lisboa (Portugal) | 0–6 | (Italy) Reale Mutua Fenera Chieri'76 | 1–3 | 0–3 |
| Olympiacos SFP Piraeus (Greece) | 1–5 | (Turkey) Galatasaray Daikin | 0–3 | 2–3 |
| SC Potsdam (Germany) | 6–0 | (Romania) CSM Târgoviște | 3–0 | 3–0 |

=== Matches ===
All times are local.

| Date | Time | | Score | | Set 1 | Set 2 | Set 3 | Set 4 | Set 5 | Total | Report |
First Leg
| 7 Jan | 20:00 | E.S. Charleroi Volley (Belgium) | 0–3 | (Italy) Roma Volley Club | 15–25 | 14–25 | 18–25 | | | 47–75 | P2 Report |
| 8 Jan | 18:00 | Sporting CP Lisboa (Portugal) | 1–3 | (Italy) Reale Mutua Fenera Chieri'76 | 25–20 | 14–25 | 20–25 | 19–25 | | 78–95 | P2 Report |
| 8 Jan | 19:00 | Olympiacos SFP Piraeus (Greece) | 0–3 | (Turkey) Galatasaray Daikin | 11–25 | 24–26 | 17–25 | | | 52–76 | P2 Report |
| 8 Jan | 19:00 | SC Potsdam (Germany) | 3–0 | (Romania) CSM Târgoviște | 25–18 | 25–14 | 25–12 | | | 75–44 | P2 Report |
Second leg
| 22 Jan | 18:00 | CSM Târgoviște (Romania) | 0–3 | (Germany) SC Potsdam | 18–25 | 13–25 | 18–25 | | | 49–75 | P2 Report |
| 22 Jan | 20:00 | Reale Mutua Fenera Chieri'76 (Italy) | 3–0 | (Portugal) Sporting CP Lisboa | 25–16 | 25–16 | 25–22 | | | 75–54 | P2 Report |
| 22 Jan | 20:00 | Roma Volley Club (Italy) | 3–1 | (Belgium) E.S. Charleroi Volley | 25–13 | 25–17 | 14–25 | 25–13 | | 89–68 | P2 Report |
| 23 Jan | 20:30 | Galatasaray Daikin (Turkey) | 3–2 | (Greece) Olympiacos SFP Piraeus | 25–13 | 20–25 | 22–25 | 25–9 | 15–8 | 107–80 | P2 Report |

== Semi-finals ==
| Team 1 | Agg. | Team 2 | 1st leg | 2nd leg | Golden Set |
|---|---|---|---|---|---|
| SC Potsdam (Germany) | 2–4 | (Italy) Roma Volley Club | 3–2 | 0–3 | |
| Galatasaray Daikin (Turkey) | 3–3 | (Italy) Reale Mutua Fenera Chieri'76 | 1–3 | 3–1 | 13–15 |

=== Matches ===
All times are local.

| Date | Time | | Score | | Set 1 | Set 2 | Set 3 | Set 4 | Set 5 | Total | Report |
First Leg
| 5 Feb | 19:30 | Galatasaray Daikin (Turkey) | 1–3 | (Italy) Reale Mutua Fenera Chieri'76 | 29–27 | 20–25 | 17–25 | 17–25 | | 83–102 | P2 Report |
| 5 Feb | 19:00 | SC Potsdam (Germany) | 3–2 | (Italy) Roma Volley Club | 25–21 | 21–25 | 19–25 | 25–15 | 15–9 | 105–95 | P2 Report |
Second leg
| 18 Feb | 20:00 | Reale Mutua Fenera Chieri'76 (Italy) | 1–3 | (Turkey) Galatasaray Daikin | 25–22 | 20–25 | 23–25 | 25–27 | | 93–99 | P2 Report |
| Golden set | | Reale Mutua Fenera Chieri'76 (Italy) | 15–13 | (Turkey) Galatasaray Daikin | | | | | | | |
| 19 Feb | 20:00 | Roma Volley Club (Italy) | 3–0 | (Germany) SC Potsdam | 25–21 | 25–19 | 25–20 | | | 75–60 | P2 Report |

== Final ==
| Team 1 | Agg. | Team 2 | 1st leg | 2nd leg |
|---|---|---|---|---|
| Reale Mutua Fenera Chieri'76 (Italy) | 1–5 | (Italy) Roma Volley Club | 2–3 | 1–3 |

=== Matches ===
All times are local.

| Date | Time | | Score | | Set 1 | Set 2 | Set 3 | Set 4 | Set 5 | Total | Report |
First Leg
| 4 Mar | 20:00 | Reale Mutua Fenera Chieri'76 (Italy) | 2–3 | (Italy) Roma Volley Club | 20–25 | 25–17 | 22–25 | 25–18 | 12–15 | 104–100 | P2 Report |
Second leg
| 11 Mar | 20:00 | Roma Volley Club (Italy) | 3–1 | (Italy) Reale Mutua Fenera Chieri'76 | 25–19 | 22–25 | 25–19 | 27–25 | | 99–88 | P2 Report |

== See also ==
- 2024–25 CEV Champions League
- 2024–25 CEV Cup
- 2024–25 CEV Challenge Cup
- 2024–25 CEV Women's Champions League
- 2024–25 Women's CEV Cup
