= Sofia Kosma =

Greek volleyball player

Personal information
- Nationality: Greece
- Born: November 15, 1993 (age 32); Athens, Greece
- Height: 1.80 m (5 ft 11 in)
- Weight: 64 kg (141 lb)
- Spike: 282 cm (111 in)
- Block: 271 cm (107 in)

Volleyball information
- Position: Outside hitter
- Current club: AEK Athens
- Number: TBD

Career
Years	Teams
2007–2009; 2009–2010; 2010–2011; 2011–2015; 2015–2016; 2016–2017; 2018–2020; 2020–2021; 2021–2022; 2022–2023; 2023–	A.O. Markopoulo; Keratea; A.O. Markopoulo; Olympiacos Piraeus; AEK Athens; Iraklis Kifisias; Panathinaikos; Kanti Schaffhausen; AEK Athens; Olympiacos Piraeus; AEK Athens

National team
Greece
- Last updated: 27 May 2023

Sofia Kosma (Greek: Σοφία Κοσμά; born November 15, 1993, in Athens, Greece) is a female professional volleyball player from Greece, who has been a member of the Greece women's national volleyball team. At club level, she plays for AEK Athens since 2023.

== Sporting achievements ==
=== National championships ===
- 2012/2013 Greek Championship, with Olympiacos Piraeus
- 2013/2014 Greek Championship, with Olympiacos Piraeus
- 2014/2015 Greek Championship, with Olympiacos Piraeus

=== National cups ===
- 2011/2012 Greek Cup, with Olympiacos Piraeus
- 2012/2013 Greek Cup, with Olympiacos Piraeus
- 2013/2014 Greek Cup, with Olympiacos Piraeus
- 2014/2015 Greek Cup, with Olympiacos Piraeus

=== Individuals ===
- 2012 Greek Cup Final Four: MVP
