= Marina Kalaitzieva =

Greek-Bulgarian volleyball player (born 1979)

Personal information
- Nationality: Greece, Bulgaria
- Born: January 24, 1979 (age 47); Bulgaria
- Height: 1.85 m (6 ft 1 in)

Volleyball information
- Position: Athletic Trainer
- Current club: AEK

National team
Greece

Marina Kalaitzieva (Greek: Μαρίνα Καλαϊτζίεβα; born January 24, 1979, in Bulgaria) is a Greek-Bulgarian female professional volleyball player who has been a member of the Greece women's national volleyball team.

At club level, she played most notably for Greek powerhouse Olympiacos Piraeus (2007–2009), with whom she reached the quarter-finals of the 2007-2008 CEV Women's Challenge Cup.
