= Yunus Öçal =

Turkish volleyball coach (born 1988)

Personal information
- Nationality: Turkish
- Born: 2 August 1988 (age 38) Turkey

Coaching information
- Current team: Panionios (coach)
- Previous teams coached
- Years: Teams
- 2006–2018; 2019–2022; 2022–2024; 2023–2024: Eczacıbaşı VitrA; THY; AEK; Greece
Honours
Women's volleyball
Representing Turkey
Islamic Solidarity Games
Gold medal – first place	2025 Rıyadh	Team

Yunus Öçal (born 2 August 1988) is a Turkish volleyball coach. He is the current assistant coach of the Turkey women's national volleyball team and head coach of Greek club Panionios.

== Club coach ==
Öçal coached Eczacıbaşı VitrA from 2006 to 2018. After THY (Türk Hava Yolları) promoted to the Turkish Women's Volleyball League, he was appointed assistant coach to the women's volleyball team, where he served until 2022. In November 2022, he was appointed head coach of the AEK Women's Volleyball Club, which play in the A1 Ethniki Women's Volleyball in Greece. The team finished the 2022–23 season fourth and won the Greek Cup.

== National team coach ==
Öçal was appointed assistant coach of the Greece women's national volleyball team in 2022, as the direct partner of the Brazilian head coach Marcello Abbondanza.

In May 2023, he was promoted to the post of head coach of the Greece women's national team, which played at the 2023 Women's European Volleyball Championship.

He was head coach of the Turkey women's national team, which became champion at the 2025 Islamic Solidarity Games in Riyadh, Saudi Arabia.

== Personal life ==
Yunus Öçal was born on 2 August 1988. He is married and father of a girl born on 8 March 2023.

== Honours ==
Turkey
(gold) 2025 Islamic Solidarity Games
