= Pola Kitsou =

Greek volleyball player (born 1972)

Personal information
- Nationality: Greek
- Born: 31 March 1972 (age 54); Athens, Greece
- Height: 1.77 m (5 ft 10 in)

Volleyball information
- Position: Libero

Polyxeni "Pola" Kitsou (born 31 March 1972) is a retired Greek female volleyball player, who played mainly as a libero. On club level, she played most notably for Panellinios, Olympiacos and AEK Athens, winning two Greek Championships in 2002 and 2012. Kitsou had also a successful career as a beach volley player, winning two Greek Championships in 2002 and 2004 and having participated in numerous international events.
