= Athina Dilaveri =

Greek volleyball player

Personal information
- Nationality: Greece
- Born: August 25, 1982 (age 44); Rethymno, Greece
- Height: 1.72 m (5 ft 8 in)

Volleyball information
- Position: Libero

Athina Dilaveri (Greek: Αθηνά Δηλαβέρη; born August 25, 1982, in Rethymno, Greece) is a Greek female volleyball player, who played mainly as a libero. She played most notably for Olympiacos, Panathinaikos and AEK Athens in the Greek Women's Volleyball League, winning 1 Greek Championship in 2011 and 1 Greek Cup in 2012. She also participated in the 2011–2012 CEV Cup with Olympiacos. Dilaveri has also a successful career as a beach volley player, having participated in numerous international events.
