= Liset Herrera =

Cuban volleyball player (born 1998)

Liset Herrera Blanco
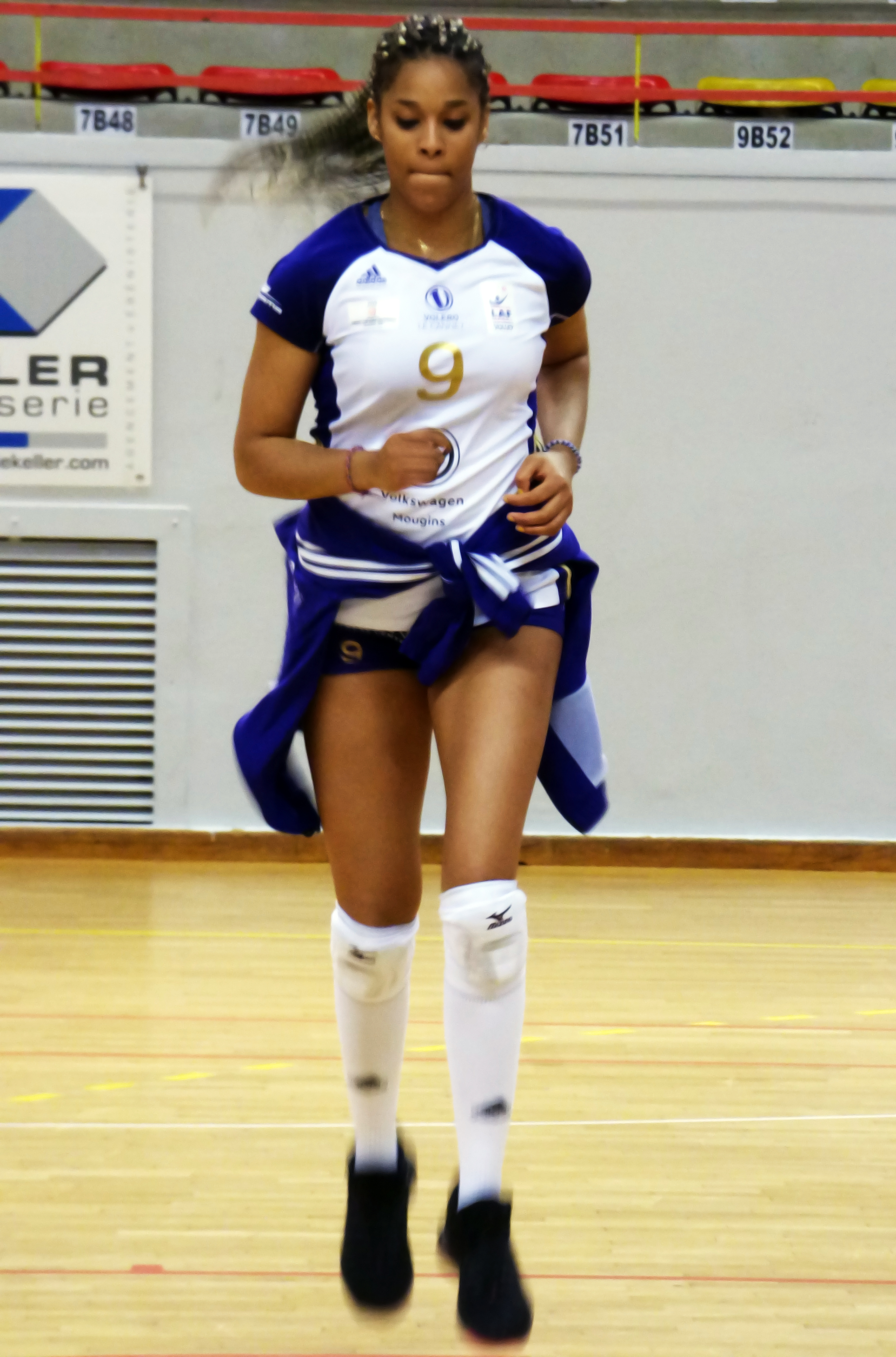

Personal information
- Nationality: Cuban
- Born: 6 December 1998 (age 27)
- Height: 1.95 m (6 ft 5 in)
- Weight: 80 kg (176 lb)
- Spike: 311 cm (122 in)
- Block: 300 cm (118 in)

Volleyball information
- Position: Middle blocker
- Current club: Karşıyaka SK
- Number: 17

Career
Years	Teams
2015–2017; 2018; 2018–2020; 2020–2022; 2022–2023; 2023–2024; 2024–	Matanzas; Volero Zürich; Volero Le Cannet; Unet E-Work Busto Arsizio; PAOK Thessaloniki; AEK Athens; Karşıyaka SK

National team
2015	Cuba

Liset Herrera Blanco (born 6 December 1998) is a Cuban female volleyball player. She plays for Karşıyaka SK in Turkey and the Cuba women's national volleyball team.

Herrera Blanco participated in the 2015 FIVB Volleyball World Grand Prix. On club level she played for Matanzas in 2015.

In June 2023, Herrera Blanco signed a one-year contract with AEK Athens volleyball club.
