= Aleksandra Kruk =

Polish volleyball player (born 1984)

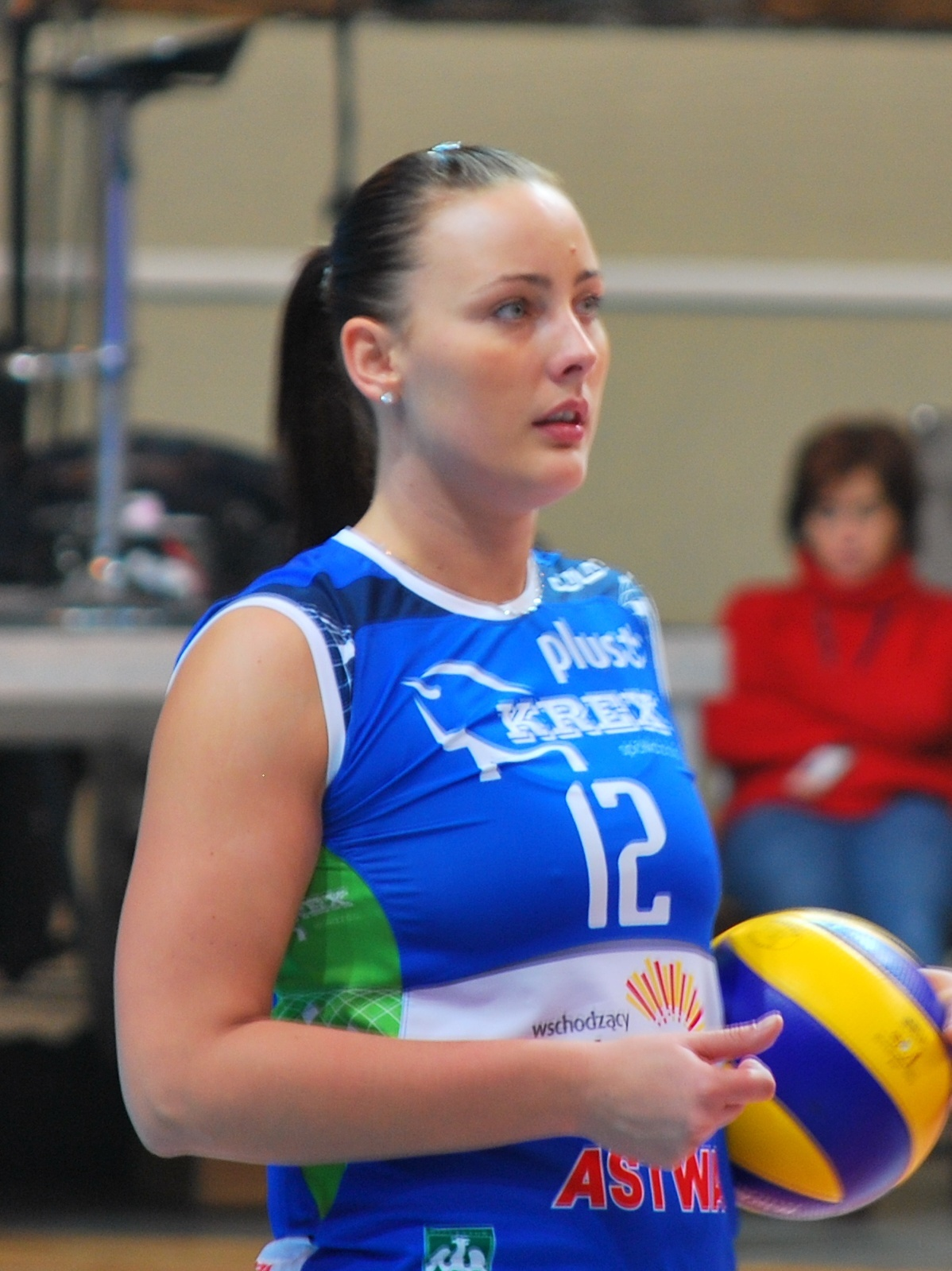
- Kruk in 2010

Personal information
- Nationality: Polish
- Born: 29 October 1984 (age 42); Elbląg, Poland
- Height: 181 cm (5 ft 11 in)
- Weight: 76 kg (168 lb)
- Spike: 298 cm (117 in)
- Block: 285 cm (112 in)

Volleyball information
- Number: 18 (national team)

Career
Years	Teams
2012	AZS Bialystok

National team
2012	Poland

Aleksandra Kruk (born 29 October 1984 in Elbląg) is a Polish volleyball player. She was part of the Poland women's national volleyball team.

She participated in the 2011 FIVB Volleyball World Grand Prix. On club level she played for AZS Bialystok in 2012.
