= Konstantinos Tambouratzis =

Greek volleyball player (born 1983)

Personal information
- Nationality: Greek
- Born: 3 September 1983 (age 43)
- Height: 193 cm (6 ft 4 in)
- Weight: 93 kg (205 lb)
- Spike: 325 cm (128 in)
- Block: 305 cm (120 in)

Career
Years	Teams
2015-2016	Olympiacos S.C.

National team
Greece

Konstantinos Tambouratzis (born 3 September 1983) is a Greek male volleyball player. He is part of the Greece men's national volleyball team. On club level he played for Olympiacos.
