= List of 1968 Summer Olympics medal winners =

The 1968 Summer Olympics were held in Mexico City, from 12 to 27 October 1968.

== Athletics ==
=== Medal table ===
* Host nation (Mexico)

Rank	Nation	Gold	Silver	Bronze	Total
1	United States	15	6	7	28
2	Kenya	3	4	1	8
3	Soviet Union	3	2	8	13
4	Australia	2	3	1	6
4	East Germany	2	3	1	6
6	Romania	2	2	0	4
7	Hungary	2	1	4	7
8	West Germany	1	4	3	8
9	Great Britain	1	2	1	4
10	Ethiopia	1	1	0	2
11	Czechoslovakia	1	0	1	2
11	France	1	0	1	2
11	Poland	1	0	1	2
11	Tunisia	1	0	1	2
15	Cuba	0	2	0	2
16	Austria	0	1	1	2
17	Brazil	0	1	0	1
17	Finland	0	1	0	1
17	Jamaica	0	1	0	1
17	Japan	0	1	0	1
17	Mexico*	0	1	0	1
22	Italy	0	0	2	2
23	Netherlands	0	0	1	1
23	New Zealand	0	0	1	1
23	Taiwan	0	0	1	1
Totals (25 entries)		36	36	36	108

=== Men's events ===
Games	Gold		Silver		Bronze	
100 metres	Jim Hines; United States	9.95 WR	Lennox Miller; Jamaica	10.04	Charles Greene; United States	10.07
200 metres	Tommie Smith; United States	19.83 WR	Peter Norman; Australia	20.06 NR	John Carlos; United States	20.10
400 metres	Lee Evans; United States	43.86 WR	Larry James; United States	43.97	Ron Freeman; United States	44.41
800 metres	Ralph Doubell; Australia	1:44.40 WR	Wilson Kiprugut; Kenya	1:44.57	Tom Farrell; United States	1:45.46
1500 metres	Kipchoge Keino; Kenya	3:34.91 OR	Jim Ryun; United States	3:37.89	Bodo Tümmler; West Germany	3:39.08
5000 metres	Mohammed Gammoudi; Tunisia	14:05.01	Kipchoge Keino; Kenya	14:05.16	Naftali Temu; Kenya	14:06.41
10,000 metres	Naftali Temu; Kenya	29:27.40	Mamo Wolde; Ethiopia	29:27.75	Mohammed Gammoudi; Tunisia	29:34.2
110 metres hurdles	Willie Davenport; United States	13.33 OR	Ervin Hall; United States	13.42	Eddy Ottoz; Italy	13.46
400 metres hurdles	David Hemery; Great Britain	48.12 WR	Gerhard Hennige; West Germany	49.02	John Sherwood; Great Britain	49.03
3000 metres steeplechase	Amos Biwott; Kenya	8:51.02	Benjamin Kogo; Kenya	8:51.56	George Young; United States	8:51.86
4 × 100 metres relay	United States; Charles Greene; Mel Pender; Ronnie Ray Smith; Jim Hines	38.24 WR	Cuba; Hermes Ramírez; Juan Morales; Pablo Montes; Enrique Figuerola	38.40	France; Gérard Fenouil; Jocelyn Delecour; Claude Piquemal; Roger Bambuck	38.43
4 × 400 metres relay	United States; Vincent Matthews; Ron Freeman; Larry James; Lee Evans	2:56.16 WR	Kenya; Daniel Rudisha; Munyoro Nyamau; Naftali Bon; Charles Asati	2:59.64	West Germany; Helmar Müller; Manfred Kinder; Gerhard Hennige; Martin Jellinghaus	3:00.57
Marathon	Mamo Wolde; Ethiopia	2:20:27	Kenji Kimihara; Japan	2:23:31	Mike Ryan; New Zealand	2:23:45
20 kilometres walk	Volodymyr Holubnychy; Soviet Union	1:33:58	José Pedraza; Mexico	1:34:00	Nikolay Smaga; Soviet Union	1:34:03
50 kilometres walk	Christoph Höhne; East Germany	4:20:14	Antal Kiss; Hungary	4:30:17	Larry Young; United States	4:31:55
High jump	Dick Fosbury; United States	2.24 m OR	Ed Caruthers; United States	2.22 m	Valentin Gavrilov; Soviet Union	2.20 m
Pole vault	Bob Seagren; United States	5.40 m OR	Claus Schiprowski; West Germany	5.40 m	Wolfgang Nordwig; East Germany	5.40 m
Long jump	Bob Beamon; United States	8.90 m WR	Klaus Beer; East Germany	8.19 m	Ralph Boston; United States	8.16 m
Triple jump	Viktor Saneyev; Soviet Union	17.39 m WR	Nelson Prudêncio; Brazil	17.27 m	Giuseppe Gentile; Italy	17.22 m
Shot put	Randy Matson; United States	20.54 m OR	George Woods; United States	20.12 m	Eduard Gushchin; Soviet Union	20.09 m
Discus throw	Al Oerter; United States	64.78 m OR	Lothar Milde; East Germany	63.08 m	Ludvík Daněk; Czechoslovakia	62.92 m
Hammer throw	Gyula Zsivótzky; Hungary	73.36 m OR	Romuald Klim; Soviet Union	73.28 m	Lázár Lovász; Hungary	69.78 m
Javelin throw	Jānis Lūsis; Soviet Union	90.10 m OR	Jorma Kinnunen; Finland	88.58 m	Gergely Kulcsár; Hungary	87.06 m
Decathlon	Bill Toomey; United States	8193 OR	Hans-Joachim Walde; West Germany	8111	Kurt Bendlin; West Germany	8064

=== Women's events ===
Games	Gold		Silver		Bronze	
100 metres	Wyomia Tyus; United States	11.08 WR	Barbara Ferrell; United States	11.15	Irena Szewińska; Poland	11.19
200 metres	Irena Szewińska; Poland	22.58 WR	Raelene Boyle; Australia	22.74	Jenny Lamy; Australia	22.88
400 metres	Colette Besson; France	52.03	Lillian Board; Great Britain	52.12	Natalya Pechonkina; Soviet Union	52.25
800 metres	Madeline Manning; United States	2:00.92 OR	Ileana Silai; Romania	2:02.58	Mia Gommers; Netherlands	2:02.63
80 metres hurdles	Maureen Caird; Australia	10.39 OR	Pam Kilborn; Australia	10.46	Chi Cheng; Taiwan	10.51
4 × 100 metres relay	United States; Margaret Bailes; Barbara Ferrell; Mildrette Netter; Wyomia Tyus	42.88 WR	Cuba; Violetta Quesada; Miguelina Cobián; Marlene Elejarde; Fulgencia Romay	43.36	Soviet Union; Galina Bukharina; Lyudmila Samotyosova; Vera Popkova; Lyudmila Zharkova	43.41
High jump	Miloslava Rezková; Czechoslovakia	1.82 m	Antonina Okorokova; Soviet Union	1.80 m	Valentina Kozyr; Soviet Union	1.80 m
Long jump	Viorica Viscopoleanu; Romania	6.82 m WR	Sheila Sherwood; Great Britain	6.68 m	Tatyana Talysheva; Soviet Union	6.66 m
Shot put	Margitta Gummel; East Germany	19.61 m WR	Marita Lange; East Germany	18.78 m	Nadezhda Chizhova; Soviet Union	18.19 m
Discus throw	Lia Manoliu; Romania	58.28 m OR	Liesel Westermann; West Germany	57.76 m	Jolán Kleiber-Kontsek; Hungary	54.90 m
Javelin throw	Angéla Németh; Hungary	60.36 m	Mihaela Peneș; Romania	59.92 m	Eva Janko; Austria	58.04 m
Pentathlon	Ingrid Becker; West Germany	5098	Liese Prokop; Austria	4966	Annamária Tóth; Hungary	4959

== Basketball ==
=== Medal table ===
Rank	NOC	Gold	Silver	Bronze	Total
1	United States	1	0	0	1
2	Yugoslavia	0	1	0	1
3	Soviet Union	0	0	1	1
Totals (3 entries)		1	1	1	3

=== Medalists ===
Event	Gold	Silver	Bronze
Men's	United States; Mike Barrett; John Clawson; Don Dee; Calvin Fowler; Spencer Haywood; Bill Hosket; Jim King; Glynn Saulters; Mike Silliman; Ken Spain; Jo Jo White; Charlie Scott	Yugoslavia; Dragutin Čermak; Krešimir Ćosić; Vladimir Cvetković; Ivo Daneu; Radivoj Korać; Zoran Marojević; Nikola Plećaš; Trajko Rajković; Dragoslav Ražnatović; Petar Skansi; Damir Šolman; Aljoša Žorga	Soviet Union; Anatoli Krikun; Modestas Paulauskas; Zurab Sakandelidze; Vadim Kapranov; Yuri Selikhov; Anatoli Polivoda; Sergei Belov; Priit Tomson; Sergei Kovalenko; Gennadi Volnov; Jaak Lipso; Vladimir Andreev

== Boxing ==
=== Medal table ===
* Host nation (Mexico)

Rank	Nation	Gold	Silver	Bronze	Total
1	Soviet Union	3	2	1	6
2	United States	2	1	4	7
3	Mexico*	2	0	2	4
4	Poland	1	2	2	5
5	East Germany	1	0	0	1
5	Great Britain	1	0	0	1
5	Venezuela	1	0	0	1
8	Cuba	0	2	0	2
9	Romania	0	1	1	2
9	South Korea	0	1	1	2
9	Uganda	0	1	1	2
12	Cameroon	0	1	0	1
13	Bulgaria	0	0	2	2
14	Argentina	0	0	1	1
14	Brazil	0	0	1	1
14	Finland	0	0	1	1
14	Italy	0	0	1	1
14	Japan	0	0	1	1
14	Kenya	0	0	1	1
14	West Germany	0	0	1	1
14	Yugoslavia	0	0	1	1
Totals (21 entries)		11	11	22	44

=== Medalists ===
Event	Gold	Silver	Bronze
Light flyweight (-48 kg)	Francisco Rodríguez; Venezuela	Jee Yong-ju; South Korea	Hubert Skrzypczak; Poland
Light flyweight (-48 kg)	Francisco Rodríguez; Venezuela	Jee Yong-ju; South Korea	Harlan Marbley; United States
Flyweight (-51 kg)	Ricardo Delgado; Mexico	Artur Olech; Poland	Servílio de Oliveira; Brazil
Flyweight (-51 kg)	Ricardo Delgado; Mexico	Artur Olech; Poland	Leo Rwabwogo; Uganda
Bantamweight (-54 kg)	Valerian Sokolov; Soviet Union	Eridadi Mukwanga; Uganda	Eiji Morioka; Japan
Bantamweight (-54 kg)	Valerian Sokolov; Soviet Union	Eridadi Mukwanga; Uganda	Chang Kyou-chul; South Korea
Featherweight (-57 kg)	Antonio Roldán; Mexico	Al Robinson; United States	Philip Waruinge; Kenya
Featherweight (-57 kg)	Antonio Roldán; Mexico	Al Robinson; United States	Ivan Mihailov; Bulgaria
Lightweight (-60 kg)	Ronnie Harris; United States	Józef Grudzień; Poland	Zvonimir Vujin; Yugoslavia
Lightweight (-60 kg)	Ronnie Harris; United States	Józef Grudzień; Poland	Calistrat Cuțov; Romania
Light welterweight (-63.5 kg)	Jerzy Kulej; Poland	Enrique Regüeiferos; Cuba	Arto Nilsson; Finland
Light welterweight (-63.5 kg)	Jerzy Kulej; Poland	Enrique Regüeiferos; Cuba	Jim Wallington; United States
Welterweight (-67 kg)	Manfred Wolke; East Germany	Joseph Bessala; Cameroon	Mario Guilloti; Argentina
Welterweight (-67 kg)	Manfred Wolke; East Germany	Joseph Bessala; Cameroon	Vladimir Musalimov; Soviet Union
Light middleweight (-71 kg)	Boris Lagutin; Soviet Union	Rolando Garbey; Cuba	John Baldwin; United States
Light middleweight (-71 kg)	Boris Lagutin; Soviet Union	Rolando Garbey; Cuba	Günther Meier; West Germany
Middleweight (-75 kg)	Chris Finnegan; Great Britain	Aleksei Kiselyov; Soviet Union	Agustín Zaragoza; Mexico
Middleweight (-75 kg)	Chris Finnegan; Great Britain	Aleksei Kiselyov; Soviet Union	Alfred Jones; United States
Light heavyweight (-81 kg)	Danas Pozniakas; Soviet Union	Ion Monea; Romania	Georgi Stankov; Bulgaria
Light heavyweight (-81 kg)	Danas Pozniakas; Soviet Union	Ion Monea; Romania	Stanisław Dragan; Poland
Heavyweight (+81 kg)	George Foreman; United States	Jonas Čepulis; Soviet Union	Giorgio Bambini; Italy
Heavyweight (+81 kg)	George Foreman; United States	Jonas Čepulis; Soviet Union	Joaquín Rocha; Mexico

== Canoeing ==
=== Medal table ===
Rank	Nation	Gold	Silver	Bronze	Total
1	Hungary	2	3	1	6
2	Soviet Union	2	1	3	6
3	West Germany	1	2	0	3
4	Romania	1	1	1	3
5	Norway	1	0	0	1
6	Austria	0	0	1	1
6	Denmark	0	0	1	1
Totals (7 entries)		7	7	7	21

=== Men's events ===
Games	Gold	Silver	Bronze
C-1 1000 metres	Tibor Tatai; Hungary	Detlef Lewe; West Germany	Vitaly Galkov; Soviet Union
C-2 1000 metres	Romania; Ivan Patzaichin; Serghei Covaliov	Hungary; Tamás Wichmann; Gyula Petrikovics	Soviet Union; Naum Prokupets; Mikhail Zamotin
K-1 1000 metres	Mihály Hesz; Hungary	Aleksandr Shaparenko; Soviet Union	Erik Hansen; Denmark
K-2 1000 metres	Soviet Union; Aleksandr Shaparenko; Vladimir Morozov	Hungary; Csaba Giczy; István Timár	Austria; Gerhard Siebold; Günther Pfaff
K-4 1000 metres	Norway; Steinar Amundsen; Tore Berger; Egil Søby; Jan Johansen	Romania; Anton Calenic; Haralambie Ivanov; Dimitrie Ivanov; Mihai Țurcaș	Hungary; Csaba Giczy; Imre Szöllősi; István Timár; István Csizmadia

=== Women's events ===
Games	Gold	Silver	Bronze
K-1 500 metres	Lyudmila Pinayeva; Soviet Union	Renate Breuer; West Germany	Viorica Dumitru; Romania
K-2 500 metres	West Germany; Annemarie Zimmermann; Roswitha Esser	Hungary; Anna Pfeffer; Katalin Rozsnyói	Soviet Union; Lyudmila Pinayeva; Antonina Seredina

== Cycling ==
=== Medal table ===
Rank	Nation	Gold	Silver	Bronze	Total
1	France	4	0	1	5
2	Denmark	1	3	0	4
3	Italy	1	1	2	4
4	Netherlands	1	1	0	2
5	Sweden	0	1	1	2
6	West Germany	0	1	0	1
7	Belgium	0	0	1	1
7	Poland	0	0	1	1
7	Switzerland	0	0	1	1
Totals (9 entries)		7	7	7	21

=== Road cycling ===
Games	Gold	Silver	Bronze
Individual road race	Pierfranco Vianelli; Italy	Leif Mortensen; Denmark	Gösta Pettersson; Sweden
Team time trial	Netherlands; Joop Zoetemelk; Fedor den Hertog; Jan Krekels; René Pijnen	Sweden; Sture Pettersson; Tomas Pettersson; Erik Pettersson; Gösta Pettersson	Italy; Pierfranco Vianelli; Giovanni Bramucci; Vittorio Marcelli; Mauro Simonetti

=== Track cycling ===
Games	Gold	Silver	Bronze
Individual Pursuit	Daniel Rebillard; France	Mogens Jensen; Denmark	Xaver Kurmann; Switzerland
Team Pursuit	Denmark; Per Jørgensen; Reno Olsen; Gunnar Asmussen; Mogens Jensen	West Germany; Karl Link; Udo Hempel; Karlheinz Henrichs; Jürgen Kissner	Italy; Luigi Roncaglia; Lorenzo Bosisio; Cipriano Chemello; Giorgio Morbiato
Sprint	Daniel Morelon; France	Giurdano Turrini; Italy	Pierre Trentin; France
Tandem	France; Daniel Morelon; Pierre Trentin	Netherlands; Leijn Loevesijn; Jan Jansen	Belgium; Daniel Goens; Robert van Lancker
Time trial	Pierre Trentin; France	Niels Fredborg; Denmark	Janusz Kierzkowski; Poland

== Diving ==
=== Medal table ===
* Host nation (Mexico)

Rank	Nation	Gold	Silver	Bronze	Total
1	United States	2	0	4	6
2	Italy	1	1	0	2
3	Czechoslovakia	1	0	0	1
4	Soviet Union	0	2	0	2
5	Mexico*	0	1	0	1
Totals (5 entries)		4	4	4	12

=== Men's events ===
Event	Gold	Silver	Bronze
3 m springboard	Bernard Wrightson; United States	Klaus Dibiasi; Italy	Jim Henry; United States
10 m platform	Klaus Dibiasi; Italy	Alvaro Gaxiola; Mexico	Win Young; United States

=== Women's events ===
Event	Gold	Silver	Bronze
3 m springboard	Susanne Gossick; United States	Tamara Pogozheva; Soviet Union	Keala O'Sullivan; United States
10 m platform	Milena Duchková; Czechoslovakia	Natalya Lobanova; Soviet Union	Ann Peterson; United States

== Equestrian events ==
=== Medal table ===
Rank	Nation	Gold	Silver	Bronze	Total
1	Great Britain	1	2	1	4
2	West Germany	1	1	2	4
3	United States	1	1	1	3
4	France	1	1	0	2
4	Soviet Union	1	1	0	2
6	Canada	1	0	0	1
7	Australia	0	0	1	1
7	Switzerland	0	0	1	1
Totals (8 entries)		6	6	6	18

=== Medalists ===
Games	Gold	Silver	Bronze
Individual dressage	Ivan Kizimov on Ikhor (URS)	Josef Neckermann on Mariano (FRG)	Reiner Klimke on Dux (FRG)
Team dressage	West Germany; Josef Neckermann and Mariano; Reiner Klimke and Dux; Liselott Linsenhoff and Piaff	Soviet Union; Yelena Petushkova and Pepel; Ivan Kizimov and Ikhor; Ivan Kalita and Absent	Switzerland; Henri Chammartin and Wolfdietrich; Marianne Gossweiler and Stephan; Gustav Fischer and Wald
Individual eventing	Jean-Jacques Guyon and Pitou (FRA)	Derek Allhusen and Lochinvar (GBR)	Michael Page and Foster (USA)
Team eventing	Great Britain; Derek Allhusen and Lochinvar; Richard Meade and Cornishman V Reuben Jones and The Poacher	United States; Michael Page and Foster; James C. Wofford and Kilkenny; Michael Plumb and Plain Sailing	Australia; Wayne Roycroft and Zhivago; Brien Cobcroft and Depeche; Bill Roycroft and Warrathoola
Individual jumping	William Steinkraus and Snowbound (USA)	Marion Coakes and Stroller (GBR)	David Broome and Mr. Softee (GBR)
Team jumping	Canada; James Day and Canadian Club; Thomas Gayford and Big Dee; Jim Elder and The Immigrant	France; Jean Rozier and Quo Vadis; Janou Lefèbvre and Rocket; Pierre Jonquères d'Oriola and Nagir	West Germany; Hermann Schridde and Dozent II; Alwin Schockemöhle and Donald Rex; Hans Günter Winkler and Enigk

== Fencing ==
=== Medal table ===
* Host nation (Mexico)

Rank	Nation	Gold	Silver	Bronze	Total
1	Soviet Union	3	4	0	7
2	Hungary	2	2	3	7
3	Poland	1	0	2	3
4	France	1	0	1	2
4	Romania	1	0	1	2
6	Italy	0	1	1	2
7	Mexico*	0	1	0	1
Totals (7 entries)		8	8	8	24

=== Men's events ===
Games	Gold	Silver	Bronze
Individual épée	Győző Kulcsár; Hungary	Grigory Kriss; Soviet Union	Gianluigi Saccaro; Italy
Team épée	Hungary; Csaba Fenyvesi; Zoltan Nemere; Pál Schmitt; Gyözö Kulcsar; Pal Nagy	Soviet Union; Grigory Kriss; Iosif Vitebsky; Aleksei Nikanchikov; Yuri Smolyakov; Viktor Modzalevsky	Poland; Bogdan Andrzejewski; Michał Butkiewicz; Bogdan Gonsior; Henryk Nielaba; Kazimierz Barburski
Individual foil	Ion Drîmbă; Romania	Jenő Kamuti; Hungary	Daniel Revenu; France
Team foil	France; Daniel Revenu; Gilles Berolatti; Christian Noël; Jean-Claude Magnan; Jacques Dimont	Soviet Union; German Sveshnikov; Yuri Sharov; Vasili Stankovich; Viktor Putyatin; Yuri Sisikin	Poland; Witold Woyda; Zbigniew Skrudlik; Ryszard Parulski; Egon Franke; Adam Lisewski
Individual sabre	Jerzy Pawłowski; Poland	Mark Rakita; Soviet Union	Tibor Pézsa; Hungary
Team sabre	Soviet Union; Vladimir Nazlymov; Viktor Sidyak; Eduard Vinokurov; Mark Rakita; Umar Mavlikhanov	Italy; Wladimiro Calarese; Michele Maffei; Cesare Salvadori; Pierluigi Chicca; Rolando Rigoli	Hungary; Tamás Kovács; János Kalmár; Péter Bakonyi; Miklós Meszéna; Tibor Pézsa

=== Women's events ===
Games	Gold	Silver	Bronze
Individual foil	Elena Belova; Soviet Union	Pilar Roldán; Mexico	Ildikó Újlaky-Rejtő; Hungary
Team foil	Soviet Union; Aleksandra Zabelina; Tatyana Samusenko; Elena Belova; Galina Gorokhova; Svetlana Tširkova	Hungary; Lidia Dömölki-Sakovics; Ildikó Bóbis; Ildikó Újlaky-Rejtő; Maria Jarmy; Paula Marosi-Foldesi	Romania; Ecaterina Iencic-Stahl; Ileana Gyulai-Drimba-Jenei; Maria Vicol; Olga Orban-Szabo; Ana Dersidan-Ene-Pascu

== Field hockey ==
=== Medal table ===
Rank	Nation	Gold	Silver	Bronze	Total
1	Pakistan	1	0	0	1
2	Australia	0	1	0	1
3	India	0	0	1	1
Totals (3 entries)		1	1	1	3

=== Medalists ===
Event	Gold	Silver	Bronze
Men's	Pakistan; Abdul Rashid; Jahangir Butt; Tanvir Dar; Gulraiz Akhtar; Khalid Mahmood; Muhammad Asad Malik; Muhammad Ashfaq Ahmed; Tariq Niazi; Riaz Ahmed; Riaz ud-Din; Saeed Anwar; Tariq Aziz; Zakir Hussain	Australia; Paul Dearing; Raymond Evans; Brian Glencross; Robert Haigh; Donald Martin; James Mason; Patrick Nilan; Eric Pearce; Gordon Pearce; Julian Pearce; Desmond Piper; Fred Quine; Ronald Riley; Donald Smart; Arthur Busch	India; Rajendra Christy; Krishnamurty Perumal; John "V.J." Peter; Inam-ur Rahman; Munir Sait; Ajitpal Singh; Balbir Singh Kullar; Balbir Singh Kular; Balbir Singh; Gurbux Singh; Harbinder Singh; Harmik Singh; Inder "Gogi" Singh; Prithipal Singh; Tarsem Singh; Jagjit Singh

== Football ==
=== Medal table ===
Rank	Nation	Gold	Silver	Bronze	Total
1	Hungary	1	0	0	1
2	Bulgaria	0	1	0	1
3	Japan	0	0	1	1
Totals (3 entries)		1	1	1	3

=== Medalists ===
Event	Gold	Silver	Bronze
Men's	Hungary; István Básti; Antal Dunai; Lajos Dunai; Ernő Noskó; Dezső Novák; Károly Fatér; László Fazekas; István Juhász; László Keglovich; Lajos Kocsis; Iván Menczel; László Nagy; Miklós Páncsics; István Sárközi; Lajos Szűcs; Zoltán Szarka; Miklós Szalai	Bulgaria; Stoyan Yordanov; Atanas Gerov; Georgi Hristakiev; Milko Gaydarski; Kiril Ivkov; Ivaylo Georgiev; Tsvetan Veselinov; Evgeni Yanchovski; Petar Zhekov; Atanas Hristov; Asparuh Donev; Kiril Stankov; Georgi Ivanov; Todor Nikolov; Yancho Dimitrov; Ivan Zafirov; Mihail Gyonin; Georgi Vasilev	Japan; Kenzo Yokoyama; Hiroshi Katayama; Masakatsu Miyamoto; Yoshitada Yamaguchi; Mitsuo Kamata; Ryozo Suzuki; Kiyoshi Tomizawa; Takaji Mori; Aritatsu Ogi; Eizo Yuguchi; Shigeo Yaegashi; Teruki Miyamoto; Masashi Watanabe; Yasuyuki Kuwahara; Kunishige Kamamoto; Ikuo Matsumoto; Ryuichi Sugiyama; Masahiro Hamazaki

== Gymnastics ==
=== Medal table ===
Rank	Nation	Gold	Silver	Bronze	Total
1	Japan	6	2	4	12
2	Soviet Union	5	5	8	18
3	Czechoslovakia	4	2	0	6
4	Yugoslavia	1	0	0	1
5	East Germany	0	2	2	4
6	Finland	0	1	0	1
Totals (6 entries)		16	12	14	42

=== Men's events ===
Games	Gold	Silver	Bronze
Individual all-around	Sawao Kato; Japan	Mikhail Voronin; Soviet Union	Akinori Nakayama; Japan
Team all-around	Japan; Yukio Endo; Sawao Kato; Takeshi Katō; Eizo Kenmotsu; Akinori Nakayama; Mitsuo Tsukahara	Soviet Union; Sergei Diomidov; Valery Iljinykh; Valery Karasev; Viktor Klimenko; Victor Lisitsky; Mikhail Voronin	East Germany; Günter Beier; Matthias Brehme; Gerhard Dietrich; Siegfried Fülle; Klaus Köste; Peter Weber
Floor exercise	Sawao Kato; Japan	Akinori Nakayama; Japan	Takeshi Katō; Japan
Horizontal bar	Mikhail Voronin; Soviet Union	none awarded (as there was a tie for gold)	Eizo Kenmotsu; Japan
Horizontal bar	Akinori Nakayama; Japan	none awarded (as there was a tie for gold)	Eizo Kenmotsu; Japan
Parallel bars	Akinori Nakayama; Japan	Mikhail Voronin; Soviet Union	Viktor Klimenko; Soviet Union
Pommel horse	Miroslav Cerar; Yugoslavia	Olli Laiho; Finland	Mikhail Voronin; Soviet Union
Rings	Akinori Nakayama; Japan	Mikhail Voronin; Soviet Union	Sawao Kato; Japan
Vault	Mikhail Voronin; Soviet Union	Yukio Endo; Japan	Sergei Diomidov; Soviet Union

=== Women's events ===
Games	Gold	Silver	Bronze
Individual all-around	Věra Čáslavská; Czechoslovakia	Zinaida Voronina; Soviet Union	Natalia Kuchinskaya; Soviet Union
Team all-around	Soviet Union; Lyubov Burda; Olga Karasyova; Natalia Kuchinskaya; Larisa Petrik; Ludmilla Tourischeva; Zinaida Voronina	Czechoslovakia; Věra Čáslavská; Marianna Krajčírová; Jana Kubičková; Hana Lišková; Bohumila Řimnáčová; Miroslava Skleničková	East Germany; Maritta Bauerschmidt; Karin Janz; Marianne Noack; Magdalena Schmidt; Ute Starke; Erika Zuchold
Balance beam	Natalia Kuchinskaya; Soviet Union	Věra Čáslavská; Czechoslovakia	Larisa Petrik; Soviet Union
Floor exercise	Larisa Petrik; Soviet Union	none awarded (as there was a tie for gold)	Natalia Kuchinskaya; Soviet Union
Floor exercise	Věra Čáslavská; Czechoslovakia	none awarded (as there was a tie for gold)	Natalia Kuchinskaya; Soviet Union
Uneven bars	Věra Čáslavská; Czechoslovakia	Karin Janz; East Germany	Zinaida Voronina; Soviet Union
Vault	Věra Čáslavská; Czechoslovakia	Erika Zuchold; East Germany	Zinaida Voronina; Soviet Union

== Modern pentathlon ==
=== Medal table ===
Rank	Nation	Gold	Silver	Bronze	Total
1	Hungary	1	1	0	2
2	Sweden	1	0	0	1
3	Soviet Union	0	1	1	2
4	France	0	0	1	1
Totals (4 entries)		2	2	2	6

=== Medalists ===
Event	Gold	Silver	Bronze
Individual	Björn Ferm; Sweden	András Balczó; Hungary	Pavel Lednyov; Soviet Union
Team	Hungary; András Balczó; István Móna; Ferenc Török	Soviet Union; Boris Onishchenko; Pavel Lednyov; Stasys Šaparnis	France; Raoul Gueguen; Lucien Guiguet; Jean-Pierre Giudicelli

== Rowing ==
=== Medal table ===
Rank	Nation	Gold	Silver	Bronze	Total
1	East Germany	2	1	0	3
2	Netherlands	1	2	0	3
3	West Germany	1	1	0	2
4	Italy	1	0	1	2
4	Soviet Union	1	0	1	2
6	New Zealand	1	0	0	1
7	United States	0	1	1	2
8	Australia	0	1	0	1
8	Hungary	0	1	0	1
10	Denmark	0	0	2	2
11	Argentina	0	0	1	1
11	Switzerland	0	0	1	1
Totals (12 entries)		7	7	7	21

=== Medalists ===
Games	Gold	Silver	Bronze
Single sculls	Jan Wienese; Netherlands	Jochen Meißner; West Germany	Alberto Demiddi; Argentina
Double sculls	Soviet Union; Aleksandr Timoshinin; Anatoliy Sass	Netherlands; Harry Droog; Leendert van Dis	United States; John Nunn; Bill Maher
Coxless pair	East Germany; Jörg Lucke; Heinz-Jürgen Bothe	United States; Larry Hough; Philip Johnson	Denmark; Peter Christiansen; Ib Larsen
Coxed pair	Italy; Primo Baran; Renzo Sambo; Bruno Cipolla	Netherlands; Herman Suselbeek; Hadriaan van Nes; Roderick Rijnders	Denmark; Jørn Krab; Harry Jørgensen; Preben Krab
Coxless four	East Germany; Frank Forberger; Frank Rühle; Dieter Grahn; Dieter Schubert	Hungary; Zoltán Melis; József Csermely; György Sarlós; Antal Melis	Italy; Renato Bosatta; Pier Conti-Manzini; Tullio Baraglia; Abramo Albini
Coxed four	New Zealand; Dick Joyce; Ross Collinge; Dudley Storey; Warren Cole; Simon Dickie	East Germany; Peter Kremtz; Manfred Gelpke; Roland Göhler; Klaus Jacob; Dieter Semetzky	Switzerland; Denis Oswald; Peter Bolliger; Hugo Waser; Jakob Grob; Gottlieb Fröhlich
Eight	West Germany; Horst Meyer; Wolfgang Hottenrott; Dirk Schreyer; Egbert Hirschfelder; Rüdiger Henning; Jörg Siebert; Lutz Ulbricht; Niko Ott; Gunther Tiersch (cox); Roland Böse (heat 1)	Australia; Bob Shirlaw; Gary Pearce; John Ranch; David Douglas; Peter Dickson; Joe Fazio; Michael Morgan; Alf Duval; Alan Grover	Soviet Union; Zigmas Jukna; Aleksandr Martyshkin; Antanas Bagdonavičius; Vytautas Briedis; Volodymyr Sterlik; Valentyn Kravchuk; Juozas Jagelavičius; Viktor Suslin; Yuriy Lorentsson

== Sailing ==
=== Medal table ===
Rank	Nation	Gold	Silver	Bronze	Total
1	United States	2	0	0	2
2	Great Britain	1	0	1	2
3	Soviet Union	1	0	0	1
3	Sweden	1	0	0	1
5	Austria	0	1	0	1
5	Denmark	0	1	0	1
5	Norway	0	1	0	1
5	Switzerland	0	1	0	1
5	West Germany	0	1	0	1
10	Italy	0	0	2	2
11	Brazil	0	0	1	1
11	East Germany	0	0	1	1
Totals (12 entries)		5	5	5	15

=== Medalists ===
Event	Gold	Silver	Bronze
Finn	Valentin Mankin; Soviet Union	Hubert Raudaschl; Austria	Fabio Albarelli; Italy
Flying Dutchman	Great Britain; Rodney Pattisson; Iain MacDonald-Smith	West Germany; Ulli Libor; Peter Naumann	Brazil; Reinaldo Conrad; Burkhard Cordes
Star	United States; Lowell North; Peter Barrett	Norway; Peder Lunde Jr. Per Wiken	Italy; Franco Cavallo; Camillo Gargano
Dragon	United States; George Friedrichs; Barton Jahncke; Gerald Schreck	Denmark; Aage Birch; Paul Lindemark Jørgensen; Niels Markussen	East Germany; Paul Borowski; Karl-Heinz Thun; Konrad Weichert
5.5 metre	Sweden; Ulf Sundelin; Jörgen Sundelin; Peter Sundelin	Switzerland; Louis Noverraz; Bernhard Dunand; Marcel Stern	Great Britain; Robin Aisher; Paul Anderson; Adrian Jardine

== Shooting ==
=== Medal table ===
Rank	Nation	Gold	Silver	Bronze	Total
1	Soviet Union	2	1	2	5
2	United States	1	2	0	3
3	West Germany	1	1	1	3
4	Czechoslovakia	1	0	0	1
4	Great Britain	1	0	0	1
4	Poland	1	0	0	1
7	Hungary	0	1	0	1
7	Italy	0	1	0	1
7	Romania	0	1	0	1
10	East Germany	0	0	2	2
11	New Zealand	0	0	1	1
11	Switzerland	0	0	1	1
Totals (12 entries)		7	7	7	21

=== Medalists ===
Event	Gold	Silver	Bronze
50 m pistol	Grigory Kosykh; Soviet Union	Heinz Mertel; West Germany	Harald Vollmar; East Germany
25 m rapid fire pistol	Józef Zapędzki; Poland	Marcel Roșca; Romania	Renart Suleymanov; Soviet Union
50 m rifle prone	Jan Kůrka; Czechoslovakia	László Hammerl; Hungary	Ian Ballinger; New Zealand
50 m rifle three positions	Bernd Klingner; West Germany	John Writer; United States	Vitali Parkhimovitch; Soviet Union
300 m free rifle three positions	Gary Anderson; United States	Valentin Kornev; Soviet Union	Kurt Müller; Switzerland
Skeet	Yevgeni Petrov; Soviet Union	Romano Garagnani; Italy	Konrad Wirnhier; West Germany
Trap	Bob Braithwaite; Great Britain	Thomas Garrigus; United States	Kurt Czekalla; East Germany

== Swimming ==
=== Medal table ===
* Host nation (Mexico)

Rank	Nation	Gold	Silver	Bronze	Total
1	United States	21	15	16	52
2	Australia	3	2	3	8
3	East Germany	2	3	1	6
4	Yugoslavia	1	1	0	2
5	Mexico*	1	0	1	2
6	Netherlands	1	0	0	1
7	Soviet Union	0	4	4	8
8	Canada	0	3	1	4
9	Great Britain	0	1	0	1
10	West Germany	0	0	2	2
11	France	0	0	1	1
Totals (11 entries)		29	29	29	87

=== Men's events ===
Games	Gold		Silver		Bronze	
100 m freestyle	Michael Wenden; Australia	52.2 WR	Ken Walsh; United States	52.8	Mark Spitz; United States	53.0
200 m freestyle	Michael Wenden; Australia	1:55.2 OR	Don Schollander; United States	1:55.8	John Nelson; United States	1:58.1
400 m freestyle	Mike Burton; United States	4:09.0 OR	Ralph Hutton; Canada	4:11.7	Alain Mosconi; France	4:13.3
1500 m freestyle	Mike Burton; United States	16:38.9 OR	John Kinsella; United States	16:57.3	Greg Brough; Australia	17:04.7
100 m backstroke	Roland Matthes; East Germany	58.7 OR	Charlie Hickcox; United States	1:00.2	Ronnie Mills; United States	1:00.5
200 m backstroke	Roland Matthes; East Germany	2:09.6 OR	Mitch Ivey; United States	2:10.6	Jack Horsley; United States	2:10.9
100 m breaststroke	Don McKenzie; United States	1:07.7 OR	Vladimir Kosinsky; Soviet Union	1:08.0	Nikolai Pankin; Soviet Union	1:08.0
200 m breaststroke	Felipe Muñoz; Mexico	2:28.7	Vladimir Kosinsky; Soviet Union	2:29.2	Brian Job; United States	2:29.9
100 m butterfly	Doug Russell; United States	55.9 OR	Mark Spitz; United States	56.4	Ross Wales; United States	57.2
200 m butterfly	Carl Robie; United States	2:08.7	Martyn Woodroffe; Great Britain	2:09.0	John Ferris; United States	2:09.3
200 m individual medley	Charlie Hickcox; United States	2:12.0 OR	Greg Buckingham; United States	2:13.0	John Ferris; United States	2:13.3
400 m individual medley	Charlie Hickcox; United States	4:48.4	Gary Hall, Sr. United States	4:48.7	Michael Holthaus; West Germany	4:51.4
4 × 100 m freestyle relay	United States; Zac Zorn; Stephen Rerych; Ken Walsh; Mark Spitz	3:31.7 WR	Soviet Union; Georgi Kulikov; Viktor Mazanov; Semyon Belits-Geiman; Leonid Ilyichov	3:34.2	Australia; Greg Rogers; Robert Cusack; Bob Windle; Michael Wenden	3:34.7
4 × 200 m freestyle relay	United States; John Nelson; Stephen Rerych; Mark Spitz; Don Schollander	7:52.3	Australia; Greg Rogers; Graham White; Bob Windle; Michael Wenden	7:53.7	Soviet Union; Vladimir Bure; Semyon Belits-Geiman; Georgi Kulikov; Leonid Ilyichov	8:01.6
4 × 100 m medley relay	United States; Charlie Hickcox; Don McKenzie; Doug Russell; Ken Walsh	3:54.9 WR	East Germany; Roland Matthes; Egon Henninger; Horst-Günter Gregor; Frank Wiegand	3:57.5	Soviet Union; Yuri Gromak; Vladimir Nemshilov; Vladimir Kosinsky; Leonid Ilyichov	4:00.7

=== Women's events ===
Games	Gold		Silver		Bronze	
100 m freestyle	Jan Henne; United States	1:00.0	Susan Pedersen; United States	1:00.3	Linda Gustavson; United States	1:00.3
200 m freestyle	Debbie Meyer; United States	2:10.5 OR	Jan Henne; United States	2:11.0	Jane Barkman; United States	2:11.2
400 m freestyle	Debbie Meyer; United States	4:31.8 OR	Linda Gustavson; United States	4:35.5	Karen Moras; Australia	4:37.0
800 m freestyle	Debbie Meyer; United States	9:24.0 OR	Pam Kruse; United States	9:35.7	Maria Teresa Ramírez; Mexico	9:38.5
100 m backstroke	Kaye Hall; United States	1:06.2 WR	Elaine Tanner; Canada	1:06.7	Jane Swagerty; United States	1:08.1
200 m backstroke	Lillian Watson; United States	2:24.8 OR	Elaine Tanner; Canada	2:27.4	Kaye Hall; United States	2:28.9
100 m breaststroke	Đurđica Bjedov; Yugoslavia	1:15.8 OR	Galina Prozumenshchikova; Soviet Union	1:15.9	Sharon Wichman; United States	1:16.1
200 m breaststroke	Sharon Wichman; United States	2:44.4 OR	Đurđica Bjedov; Yugoslavia	2:46.4	Galina Prozumenshchikova; Soviet Union	2:47.0
100 m butterfly	Lyn McClements; Australia	1:05.5	Ellie Daniel; United States	1:05.8	Susan Shields; United States	1:06.2
200 m butterfly	Ada Kok; Netherlands	2:24.7 OR	Helga Lindner; East Germany	2:24.8	Ellie Daniel; United States	2:25.9
200 m individual medley	Claudia Kolb; United States	2:24.7 OR	Susan Pedersen; United States	2:28.8	Jan Henne; United States	2:31.4
400 m individual medley	Claudia Kolb; United States	5:08.5 OR	Lynn Vidali; United States	5:22.2	Sabine Steinbach; East Germany	5:25.3
4 × 100 m freestyle relay	United States; Jane Barkman; Linda Gustavson; Susan Pedersen; Jan Henne	4:02.5 OR	East Germany; Gabriele Wetzko; Roswitha Krause; Uta Schmuck; Martina Grunert	4:05.7	Canada; Angela Coughlan; Marilyn Corson; Elaine Tanner; Marion Lay	4:07.2
4 × 100 m medley relay	United States; Kaye Hall; Catie Ball; Ellie Daniel; Susan Pedersen	4:28.3 OR	Australia; Lynne Watson; Judy Playfair; Lyn McClements; Janet Steinbeck	4:30.0	West Germany; Angelika Kraus; Uta Frommater; Heike Hustede; Heidemarie Reineck	4:36.4

== Volleyball ==
=== Medal table ===
Rank	Nation	Gold	Silver	Bronze	Total
1	Soviet Union	2	0	0	2
2	Japan	0	2	0	2
3	Czechoslovakia	0	0	1	1
3	Poland	0	0	1	1
Totals (4 entries)		2	2	2	6

=== Medalists ===
Games	Gold	Silver	Bronze
Men's	Soviet Union; Eduard Sibiryakov; Yuri Poyarkov; Georgi Mondzolevsky; Valeri Kravchenko; Volodymyr Byelyayev; Yevgeni Lapinsky; Ivan Bugaenkov; Oleg Antropov; Vasilius Matushevas; Viktor Mikhalchuk; Boris Tereshchuk; Vladimir Ivanov	Japan; Masayuki Minami; Katsutoshi Nekoda; Mamoru Shiragami; Isao Koizumi; Kenji Kimura; Yasuaki Mitsumori; Naohiro Ikeda; Jungo Morita; Tadayoshi Yokota; Seiji Oko; Tetsuo Satō; Kenji Shimaoka	Czechoslovakia; Bohumil Golián; Antonin Prochazka; Petr Kop; Jiri Svoboda; Josef Musil; Lubomir Zajisek; Josef Smolka; Vladimir Petlak; Frantisek Sokol; Zdenek Groessel; Pavel Schenk; Drahomir Koudelka
Women's	Soviet Union; Lyudmila Buldakova; Lyudmila Mikhailkovskaya; Tatyana Veinberga; Vera Lantratova; Vera Galushka-Duyunova; Tatyana Sarycheva; Tatyana Ponyaeva-Tretyakova; Nina Smoleeva; Inna Ryskal; Galina Leontyeva; Roza Salikhova; Valentina Kamenek-Vinogradova	Japan; Setsuko Yosjida; Suzue Takayama; Toyoko Iwahara; Youko Kasahara; Aiko Onozawa; Yukiyo Kojima; Sachiko Fukanaka; Kunie Shishikura; Setsuko Inoue; Sumie Oinuma; Makiko Furakawa; Keiko Hama	Poland; Elżbieta Porzec; Zofia Szczęśniewska; Wanda Wiecha; Barbara Hermela-Niemczyk; Krystyna Ostromęcka; Krystyna Krupa; Jadwiga Książek; Józefa Ledwig; Krystyna Jakubowska; Lidia Chmielnicka; Krystyna Czajkowska; Halina Aszkiełowicz

== Water polo ==
=== Medal table ===
Rank	Nation	Gold	Silver	Bronze	Total
1	Yugoslavia	1	0	0	1
2	Soviet Union	0	1	0	1
3	Hungary	0	0	1	1
Totals (3 entries)		1	1	1	3

=== Medalists ===
Event	Gold	Silver	Bronze
Men's	Yugoslavia; Ozren Bonačić; Dejan Dabović; Zdravko Hebel; Zoran Janković; Ronald Lopatni; Uroš Marović; Đorđe Perišić; Miroslav Poljak; Mirko Sandić; Karlo Stipanić; Ivo Trumbić	Soviet Union; Vadim Gulyaev; Givi Chikvanaya; Boris Grishin; Aleksandr Dolgushin; Aleksei Barkalov; Yuri Grigorovsky; Vladimir Semyonov; Aleksandr Shidlovsky; Vyacheslav Skok; Leonid Osipov; Oleg Bovin	Hungary; András Bodnár; Zoltán Dömötör; László Felkai; Ferenc Konrád; János Konrád; Mihály Mayer; László Sárosi; János Steinmetz; Endre Molnár; Dénes Pócsik; István Szívós, Jr.

== Weightlifting ==
=== Medal table ===
Rank	Nation	Gold	Silver	Bronze	Total
1	Soviet Union	3	3	0	6
2	Japan	1	1	1	3
3	Iran	1	1	0	2
4	Poland	1	0	4	5
5	Finland	1	0	0	1
6	Hungary	0	1	1	2
7	Belgium	0	1	0	1
8	United States	0	0	1	1
Totals (8 entries)		7	7	7	21

=== Medalists ===
Games	Gold	Silver	Bronze
56 kg	Mohammad Nassiri; Iran	Imre Földi; Hungary	Henryk Trębicki; Poland
60 kg	Yoshinobu Miyake; Japan	Dito Shanidze; Soviet Union	Yoshiyuki Miyake; Japan
67.5 kg	Waldemar Baszanowski; Poland	Parviz Jalayer; Iran	Marian Zieliński; Poland
75 kg	Viktor Kurentsov; Soviet Union	Masushi Ouchi; Japan	Károly Bakos; Hungary
82.5 kg	Boris Selitsky; Soviet Union	Vladimir Belyaev; Soviet Union	Norbert Ozimek; Poland
90 kg	Kaarlo Kangasniemi; Finland	Jaan Talts; Soviet Union	Marek Gołąb; Poland
+90 kg	Leonid Zhabotinsky; Soviet Union	Serge Reding; Belgium	Joseph Dube; United States

== Wrestling ==
=== Medal table ===
Rank	Nation	Gold	Silver	Bronze	Total
1	Japan	4	1	0	5
2	Soviet Union	3	5	1	9
3	Bulgaria	2	3	1	6
4	Hungary	2	0	2	4
5	East Germany	2	0	0	2
5	Turkey	2	0	0	2
7	Iran	1	0	2	3
8	France	0	2	0	2
8	United States	0	2	0	2
10	Mongolia	0	1	3	4
11	Romania	0	1	2	3
12	Yugoslavia	0	1	1	2
13	Czechoslovakia	0	0	2	2
14	Greece	0	0	1	1
14	West Germany	0	0	1	1
Totals (15 entries)		16	16	16	48

=== Freestyle ===
Games	Gold	Silver	Bronze
52 kg	Shigeo Nakata; Japan	Richard Sanders; United States	Chimedbazaryn Damdinsharav; Mongolia
57 kg	Yojiro Uetake; Japan	Donald Behm; United States	Aboutaleb Talebi; Iran
63 kg	Masaaki Kaneko; Japan	Enyu Todorov; Bulgaria	Shamseddin Seyed-Abbasi; Iran
70 kg	Abdollah Movahed; Iran	Enyu Valchev; Bulgaria	Danzandarjaagiin Sereeter; Mongolia
78 kg	Mahmut Atalay; Turkey	Daniel Robin; France	Tömöriin Artag; Mongolia
87 kg	Boris Michail Gurevich; Soviet Union	Jigjidiin Mönkhbat; Mongolia	Prodan Gardzhev; Bulgaria
97 kg	Ahmet Ayık; Turkey	Shota Lomidze; Soviet Union	József Csatári; Hungary
+97 kg	Aleksandr Medved; Soviet Union	Osman Duraliev; Bulgaria	Wilfried Dietrich; West Germany

=== Greco-Roman ===
Games	Gold	Silver	Bronze
52 kg	Petar Kirov; Bulgaria	Vladimir Bakulin; Soviet Union	Miroslav Zeman; Czechoslovakia
57 kg	János Varga; Hungary	Ion Baciu; Romania	Ivan Kochergin; Soviet Union
63 kg	Roman Rurua; Soviet Union	Hideo Fujimoto; Japan	Simion Popescu; Romania
70 kg	Muneji Munemura; Japan	Stevan Horvat; Yugoslavia	Petros Galaktopoulos; Greece
78 kg	Rudolf Vesper; East Germany	Daniel Robin; France	Károly Bajkó; Hungary
87 kg	Lothar Metz; East Germany	Valentin Oleynik; Soviet Union	Branislav Simić; Yugoslavia
97 kg	Boyan Radev; Bulgaria	Nikolai Yakovenko; Soviet Union	Nicolae Martinescu; Romania
+97 kg	István Kozma; Hungary	Anatoly Roshchin; Soviet Union	Petr Kment; Czechoslovakia
