= Japan at the 1968 Summer Olympics =

- IOC code: JPN
- Website: www.joc.or.jp (in Japanese and English)

in Mexico City
- Competitors: 171 (146 men and 25 women) in 18 sports
- Flag bearer: Yukio Endo
- Medals Ranked 3rd: Gold 11 Silver 7 Bronze 7 Total 25

Summer Olympics appearances (overview)
- 1912; 1920; 1924; 1928; 1932; 1936; 1948; 1952; 1956; 1960; 1964; 1968; 1972; 1976; 1980; 1984; 1988; 1992; 1996; 2000; 2004; 2008; 2012; 2016; 2020; 2024; 2028

Japan, the previous host of the 1964 Summer Olympics in Tokyo, competed at the 1968 Summer Olympics in Mexico City, Mexico. 171 competitors, 146 men and 25 women, took part in 97 events in 18 sports.

== Medalists ==
Medal	Name	Sport	Event	Date
Gold	Yoshinobu Miyake	Weightlifting	Men's 60 kg	October 14
Gold	Shigeo Nakata	Wrestling	Men's freestyle 52 kg	October 20
Gold	Yojiro Uetake	Wrestling	Men's freestyle 57 kg	October 20
Gold	Masaaki Kaneko	Wrestling	Men's freestyle 63 kg	October 20
Gold	Yukio Endo; Sawao Kato; Takeshi Katō; Eizo Kenmotsu; Akinori Nakayama; Mitsuo Tsukahara	Gymnastics	Men's artistic team all-around	October 24
Gold	Sawao Kato	Gymnastics	Men's artistic individual all-around	October 24
Gold	Sawao Kato	Gymnastics	Men's floor	October 26
Gold	Akinori Nakayama	Gymnastics	Men's parallel bars	October 26
Gold	Akinori Nakayama	Gymnastics	Men's horizontal bar	October 26
Gold	Akinori Nakayama	Gymnastics	Men's rings	October 26
Gold	Muneji Munemura	Wrestling	Men's Greco-Roman 70 kg	October 26
Silver	Masushi Ouchi	Weightlifting	Men's 75 kg	October 16
Silver	Kenji Kimihara	Athletics	Men's marathon	October 20
Silver	Hideo Fujimoto	Wrestling	Men's Greco-Roman 63 kg	October 26
Silver	Akinori Nakayama	Gymnastics	Men's floor	October 26
Silver	Yukio Endo	Gymnastics	Men's vault	October 26
Silver	Setsuko Yoshida; Suzue Takayama; Toyoko Iwahara; Youko Kasahara; Aiko Onozawa; Yukiyo Kojima; Sachiko Fukanaka; Kunie Shishikura; Setsuko Inoue; Sumie Oinuma; Makiko Furakawa; Keiko Hama	Volleyball	Women's tournament	October 26
Silver	Masayuki Minami; Katsutoshi Nekoda; Mamoru Shiragami; Isao Koizumi; Kenji Kimura; Yasuaki Mitsumori; Naohiro Ikeda; Jungo Morita; Tadayoshi Yokota; Seiji Oko; Tetsuo Satō; Kenji Shimaoka	Volleyball	Men's tournament	October 26
Bronze	Yoshiyuki Miyake	Weightlifting	Men's 60 kg	October 14
Bronze	Akinori Nakayama	Gymnastics	Men's artistic individual all-around	October 24
Bronze	Takeshi Katō	Gymnastics	Men's floor	October 26
Bronze	Eizo Kenmotsu	Gymnastics	Men's horizontal bar	October 26
Bronze	Sawao Kato	Gymnastics	Men's rings	October 26
Bronze	Eiji Morioka	Boxing	Men's bantamweight	October 26
Bronze	Kenzo Yokoyama; Hiroshi Katayama; Masakatsu Miyamoto; Yoshitada Yamaguchi; Mitsuo Kamata; Ryozo Suzuki; Kiyoshi Tomizawa; Takaji Mori; Aritatsu Ogi; Eizo Yuguchi; Shigeo Yaegashi; Teruki Miyamoto; Masashi Watanabe; Yasuyuki Kuwahara; Kunishige Kamamoto; Ikuo Matsumoto; Ryuichi Sugiyama; Masahiro Hamazaki	Football	Men's football	October 26

Medals by sport
Sport	1st place, gold medalist(s)	2nd place, silver medalist(s)	3rd place, bronze medalist(s)	Total
Gymnastics	6	2	4	12
Wrestling	4	1	0	5
Weightlifting	1	1	1	3
Volleyball	0	2	0	2
Athletics	0	1	0	1
Boxing	0	0	1	1
Football	0	0	1	1
Total	11	7	7	25

== Athletics ==
Men
Track & road events

Athlete	Event	Heat		Quarterfinal		Semifinal		Final	
Athlete	Event	Result	Rank	Result	Rank	Result	Rank	Result	Rank
Hiroomi Yamada	Long jump	7.67	17	—N/a				7.93w	10
Naoki Abe	Long jump	7.58	22	—N/a				Did not advance	
Shinji Ogura	Long jump	7.57	24	—N/a				Did not advance	
Tsugumichi Suzuki	10,000 metres	—N/a						30:52.0	19
Keisuke Sawaki	10,000 metres	—N/a						31:25.2	27
Kenji Kimihara	Marathon	—N/a						2:23:31	2nd place, silver medalist(s)

== Boxing ==
Men

Athlete	Event	Round of 32	Round of 16	Quarterfinals	Semifinals	Final	
Athlete	Event	Opposition Result	Opposition Result	Opposition Result	Opposition Result	Opposition Result	Rank
Watanabe	Light Flyweight	Zaporozhets (URS); L 0–3	Did not advance				
Nakamura	Flyweight	Bye		Delgado (MEX); L 0–5	Did not advance		
Morioka'	Flyweight	Bye		Dowling (IRL); W 4–1	Sokolov (URS); L 5–0		

== Canoeing ==
=== Sprint ===
men

Athlete	Event	Heats		Semifinals		Final	
Athlete	Event	Time	Rank	Time	Rank	Time	Rank
Tetsumasa Yamaguchi	C-1 1000 metres	4:33.3	Qs	4:54.61	5	Did not advance	
Tetsumasa Yamaguchi; Nobuatsu Yoshino	C-2 1000 m	3:58.44	5 QS	4:29.54	5	Did not advance	

== Cycling ==
One cyclist represented Japan in 1968.

=== Track ===
Sprint

Athlete	Event	Qualification		Round 1	Repechage 1	Round 2	Repechage 2	Quarterfinals	Semifinals	Final	
Athlete	Event	Time Speed (km/h)	Rank	Opposition Time Speed (km/h)	Opposition Time Speed (km/h)	Opposition Time Speed (km/h)	Opposition Time Speed (km/h)	Opposition Time Speed (km/h)	Opposition Time Speed (km/h)	Opposition Time Speed (km/h)	Rank
Sanji Inoue	Men's Sprint						Kravtsov (URS); L	Did not advance			

=== Road ===
Men

Athlete	Event	Time	Rank
Sanji Inoue	time trial	1:07.54	19

== Diving ==
Men

Athlete	Event	Preliminaries		Semifinals		Final	
Athlete	Event	Points	Rank	Points	Rank	Points	Rank
Junji Yuasa	3 m springboard	86.80	18	Did not advance			
Yosuke Arimitsu	10 m platform	81.72	26	Did not advance			
Toshio Otsubo	10 m platform	83.18	24	Did not advance			
Junji Yuasa	10 m platform	84.10	23	Did not advance			

Women

Athlete	Event	Preliminaries		Semifinals		Final	
Athlete	Event	Points	Rank	Points	Rank	Points	Rank
Keiko Osaki	3 m springboard	DNS		Did not advance			
Keiko Osaki	10 m platform	45.66	10 Q	47.42	5	93.08	7

== Fencing ==
Five fencers, all men, represented Japan in 1968.

Men's foil

- Heizaburo Okawa
- Kazuo Mano
- Fujio Shimizu

Men's team foil

- Masaya Fukuda, Heizaburo Okawa, Fujio Shimizu, Kazuhiko Wakasugi, Kazuo Mano

== Football ==
Group play

Team	Pld	W	D	L	GF	GA	GD	Pts
Spain	3	2	1	0	4	0	+4	5
Japan	3	1	2	0	4	2	+2	4
Brazil	3	0	2	1	4	5	−1	2
Nigeria	3	0	1	2	4	9	−5	1

1968-10-14
12:00

Japan	3 – 1	Nigeria
Kamamoto 24' 72' 89'	Report	Okoye 33'

Estadio Cuauhtémoc, Puebla
Referee: Ramon Sagastume Marmol (El Salvador)
1968-10-16
12:00

Brazil	1 – 1	Japan
Ferretti 9'	Report	Watanabe 83'

Estadio Cuauhtémoc, Puebla
Referee: George Lamptey (Ghana)
1968-10-18
12:00

Spain	0 – 0	Japan
	Report

Azteca Stadium, Mexico City
Referee: Erwin Hieger (Peru)

Quarterfinals

1968-10-20
12:00

Japan	3 – 1	France
Kamamoto 27' 59'; Watanabe 70'	Report	Teamboueon 32'

Azteca Stadium, Mexico City
Referee: Seyoum Tarekegn (Ethiopia)

Semi-final

1968-10-22
12:00

Hungary	5 – 0	Japan
Szűcs 30' 60' 75'; Novák 53' 65'	Report

Azteca Stadium, Mexico City
Referee: Romualdo Arppi Filho (Brazil)

Bronze Medal Match

1968-10-24
12:00

Japan	2 – 0	Mexico
Kamamoto 20' 40'	Report

Azteca Stadium, Mexico City
Attendance: 105,000
Referee: Abraham Klein (Israel)

== Modern pentathlon ==
Three male pentathletes represented Japan in 1968.

Individual

- Yuso Makihira
- Katsuaki Tashiro
- Toshio Fukui

Team

- Yuso Makihira
- Katsuaki Tashiro
- Toshio Fukui

== Rowing ==
Men

Athlete	Event	Heats		Repechage		Semifinals		Final	
Athlete	Event	Time	Rank	Time	Rank	Time	Rank	Time	Rank
Tsugio Ito	Single sculls	8:10.00	6 R	7:58.08	4	Did not advance			
Masatoshi Shimizu; Tomio Murai; Tadamasa Kato; Shigeru Miyagawa; Fumio Nakata; Jujiro Tanaka; Toshi Fukumasu; Yoshinori Arai; Katsumi Yamamoto (cox)	Eight	6:34.79	6 R	6:44.37	5 FB	—N/a		6:52.02	6

== Shooting ==
Six shooters, all men, represented Japan in 1968.

Open

Athlete	Event	Final	
Athlete	Event	Points	Rank
Takeo Kamachi	25 m rapid fire pistol	586	12
Shigeto Kusunoki	50 m pistol	528	50
Shigemi Saito	50 m rifle, prone	576	84
Hiromu Sekine	50 m rifle, prone	585	60
Makoto Shiraishi	25 m rapid fire pistol	582	23
Yoshihisa Yoshikawa	50 m pistol	548	17

== Volleyball ==
=== Men's Tournament ===
Group play

Pos	Team	Pld	W	L	Pts	SW	SL	SR	SPW	SPL	SPR
1	Soviet Union	9	8	1	17	26	8	3.250	464	326	1.423
2	Japan	9	7	2	16	24	6	4.000	430	258	1.667
3	Czechoslovakia	9	7	2	16	22	15	1.467	454	417	1.089
4	East Germany	9	6	3	15	22	12	1.833	449	374	1.201
5	Poland	9	6	3	15	18	11	1.636	371	281	1.320
6	Bulgaria	9	4	5	13	16	17	0.941	379	385	0.984
7	United States	9	4	5	13	15	18	0.833	383	414	0.925
8	Belgium	9	2	7	11	6	24	0.250	239	417	0.573
9	Brazil	9	1	8	10	8	25	0.320	357	469	0.761
10	Mexico	9	0	9	9	6	27	0.222	289	474	0.610

=== Women's Tournament ===
Women's Team Competition

- Round Robin

- Defeated United States (3-0)
- Defeated Mexico (3-0)
- Defeated Peru (3-0)
- Defeated Czechoslovakia (3-0)
- Defeated Poland (3-0)
- Defeated South Korea (3-0)
- Lost to Soviet Union (1-3) → Silver Medal

- Team Roster

- Setsuko Yosjida
- Suzue Takayama
- Toyoko Iwahara
- Youko Kasahara
- Aiko Onozawa
- Yukiyo Kojima
- Sachiko Fukanaka
- Kunie Shishikura
- Setsuko Inoue
- Sumie Oinuma
- Makiko Furakawa
- Keiko Hama

== Water polo ==
- Team Roster

- Haruo Sato
- Hirokatsu Kuwayama
- Kazuya Takeuchi
- Koji Nakano
- Kunio Yonehara
- Seiya Sakamoto
- Shigeharu Kuwabara
- Shuzo Yajima
- Tetsunosuke Ishii

Group play

Pos	Team	Pld	W	D	L	GF	GA	GD	Pts
1	Italy	7	6	1	0	48	21	+27	13
2	Yugoslavia	7	5	1	1	65	18	+47	11
3	East Germany	7	5	1	1	66	22	+44	11
4	Netherlands	7	4	1	2	42	28	+14	9
5	Japan	7	3	0	4	26	57	−31	6
6	Mexico	7	1	1	5	27	56	−29	3
7	Greece	7	1	0	6	34	62	−28	2
8	Egypt	7	0	1	6	21	65	−44	1

Italy	9–2	Japan

Japan	8–7	Greece

Netherlands	9–1	Japan

Egypt	7–4	Japan

East Germany	8–0	Japan

Mexico	3–6	Japan

Yugoslavia	17'–0	Japan
