= Volleyball at the 1968 Summer Olympics – Women's tournament =

Women's volleyball at the Games of the XIX Olympiad
- Venue: Juan de la Barrera Olympic Gymnasium; Revolution Ice Rink
- Date: 13–26 October
- Competitors: 94 from 8 nations

Medalists
1st place, gold medalist(s)		Soviet Union (1st title)
2nd place, silver medalist(s)		Japan
3rd place, bronze medalist(s)		Poland

The 1968 Women's Olympic Volleyball Tournament was the 2nd edition of the event, organized by the world's governing body, the FIVB in conjunction with the IOC. It was held in Ciudad de México, Mexico from October 13 to 26, 1968.

== Qualification ==
Qualifiers	Date	Host	Vacancies	Qualified
Host country	18 October 1963	(West Germany) Baden-Baden	1	Mexico
1964 Olympic Games	Oct. 11–23, 1964	(Japan) Tokyo	1	Japan
1967 World Championship	Jan. 25 – 29, 1967	(Japan) Tokyo	3	United States; South Korea; Peru*
1967 European Championship	Oct. 22 – Nov. 7, 1967	(Turkey) İzmir	3	Soviet Union; Poland; Czechoslovakia
Total			8	

* Peru qualified as the 1967 World Championship fourth best team as winners Japan were already qualified as 1964 Olympic champions.

== Format ==
The tournament was played in a single round-robin format, all teams were placed into a single pool and faced each other once.

== Venues ==
- Juan de la Barrera Olympic Gymnasium, Ciudad de México
- Revolution Ice Rink, Ciudad de México

== Round robin ==
Pos	Team	Pld	W	L	Pts	SW	SL	SR	SPW	SPL	SPR
1	Soviet Union	7	7	0	14	21	3	7.000	333	194	1.716
2	Japan	7	6	1	13	19	3	6.333	318	147	2.163
3	Poland	7	5	2	12	15	11	1.364	324	304	1.066
4	Peru	7	3	4	10	12	15	0.800	306	327	0.936
5	South Korea	7	3	4	10	11	14	0.786	276	305	0.905
6	Czechoslovakia	7	3	4	10	11	15	0.733	307	307	1.000
7	Mexico	7	1	6	8	7	18	0.389	215	338	0.636
8	United States	7	0	7	7	4	21	0.190	196	353	0.555

Date		Score		Set 1	Set 2	Set 3	Set 4	Set 5	Total	Report
13 Oct	Poland	3–2	South Korea	10–15	12–15	15–10	15–12	17–15	69–67	Report
13 Oct	Japan	3–0	United States	15–6	15–2	15–2			45–10	Report
13 Oct	Soviet Union	3–1	Czechoslovakia	8–15	15–7	15–13	15–7		53–42	Report
13 Oct	Peru	3–2	Mexico	15–17	15–5	10–15	15–2	15–7	70–46	Report
14 Oct	Peru	3–0	South Korea	15–13	15–6	15–9			45–28	Report
14 Oct	Czechoslovakia	3–1	United States	15–8	11–15	15–9	15–11		56–43	Report
14 Oct	Japan	3–0	Mexico	15–7	15–3	15–2			45–12	Report
14 Oct	Soviet Union	3–0	Poland	15–5	15–11	15–4			45–20	Report
15 Oct	Czechoslovakia	3–0	Mexico	15–8	15–2	16–14			46–24	Report
15 Oct	Japan	3–0	Peru	15–3	15–11	15–9			45–23	Report
16 Oct	Poland	3–0	United States	15–3	15–1	16–14			46–18	Report
16 Oct	Soviet Union	3–0	South Korea	15–9	15–6	15–2			45–17	Report
17 Oct	South Korea	3–1	United States	15–9	15–13	6–15	15–5		51–42	Report
17 Oct	Soviet Union	3–0	Peru	15–4	15–9	15–9			45–22	Report
19 Oct	Japan	3–0	Czechoslovakia	15–7	15–8	15–7			45–22	Report
19 Oct	Poland	3–2	Mexico	15–9	12–15	15–11	11–15	15–4	68–54	Report
20 Oct	Japan	3–0	Poland	15–5	15–6	15–6			45–17	Report
20 Oct	Czechoslovakia	3–2	Peru	7–15	13–15	15–9	15–2	15–3	65–44	Report
21 Oct	Soviet Union	3–1	United States	15–1	6–15	15–4	15–6		51–26	Report
21 Oct	South Korea	3–0	Mexico	15–5	15–4	15–6			45–15	Report
23 Oct	Soviet Union	3–0	Mexico	15–6	15–10	15–3			45–19	Report
23 Oct	Peru	3–1	United States	15–11	15–0	14–16	15–12		59–39	Report
24 Oct	Poland	3–0	Czechoslovakia	15–13	15–7	15–12			45–32	Report
24 Oct	Japan	3–0	South Korea	15–5	15–5	15–4			45–14	Report
25 Oct	Poland	3–1	Peru	15–10	14–16	15–9	15–8		59–43	Report
25 Oct	South Korea	3–1	Czechoslovakia	15–9	15–9	9–15	15–11		54–44	Report
26 Oct	Mexico	3–0	United States	15–8	15–7	15–4			45–19	Report
26 Oct	Soviet Union	3–1	Japan	15–10	16–14	3–15	15–9		49–48	Report

== Final standings ==
Place	Team
1st place, gold medalist(s)	Soviet Union
2nd place, silver medalist(s)	Japan
3rd place, bronze medalist(s)	Poland
4	Peru
5	South Korea
6	Czechoslovakia
7	Mexico
8	United States

1968 Women's Olympic champions

Soviet Union
1st title

12-woman roster
Lyudmila Buldakova, Lyudmila Mikhailkovskaya, Tatyana Veinberga, Vera Lantratova, Vera Galushka-Duyunova, Tatyana Sarycheva, Tatyana Ponyaeva-Tretyakova, Nina Smoleeva, Inna Ryskal, Galina Leontyeva, Roza Salikhova, Valentina Kamenek-Vinogradova
Head coach
Givi Akhvlediani

== Medalists ==
Gold	Silver	Bronze
Soviet Union Lyudmila Buldakova; Lyudmila Mikhailkovskaya; Tatyana Veinberga; Vera Lantratova; Vera Galushka-Duyunova; Tatyana Sarycheva; Tatyana Ponyaeva-Tretyakova; Nina Smoleeva; Inna Ryskal; Galina Leontyeva; Roza Salikhova; Valentina Kamenek-Vinogradova Head coach: Givi Akhvlediani	Japan Setsuko Yosjida; Suzue Takayama; Toyoko Iwahara; Youko Kasahara; Aiko Onozawa; Yukiyo Kojima; Sachiko Fukanaka; Kunie Shishikura; Setsuko Inoue; Sumie Oinuma; Makiko Furakawa; Keiko Hama Head coach: Shigeo Yamada	Poland Elżbieta Porzec; Zofia Szczęśniewska; Wanda Wiecha; Barbara Niemczyk; Krystyna Ostromęcka; Krystyna Krupa; Jadwiga Książek; Józefa Ledwig; Krystyna Jakubowska; Lidia Chmielnicka; Krystyna Czajkowska; Halina Aszkiełowicz Head coach: Benedykt Krysik

== See also ==
- Volleyball at the Summer Olympics
- Volleyball at the 1968 Summer Olympics – Men's tournament
