= Volleyball at the 1966 Asian Games =

- Venue: Thammasat Gymnasium
- Dates: 10–19 December 1966
- Nations: 13

Volleyball events were contested at the 1966 Asian Games at Thammasat Gymnasium in Bangkok, Thailand from 10 December to 19 December 1966.

== Medalists ==
Event	Gold	Silver	Bronze
Men	Japan; Takeshi Furukawa; Naohiro Ikeda; Kenji Kimura; Isao Koizumi; Masayuki Minami; Jungo Morita; Teruhisa Moriyama; Yuzo Nakamura; Katsutoshi Nekoda; Mamoru Shiragami; Tadayoshi Yokota	South Korea; Choi Jong-ok; Chung Kwang-soo; Chung Sun-hung; Jin Jun-tak; Kim Jin-hee; Kim Sung-kil; Kim Young-dae; Kim Young-hwan; Kim Young-nam; Lim Tae-ho; Oh Chan-suk; Park Su-kwang	Iran; Changiz Ansari; Khosro Ebrahim; Mohammad Hemmatyar; Hassan Kabiri; Mohammad Hassan Kord; Mojtaba Mortazavi; Mahmoud Motlagh; Khalil Paknazar; Masoud Salehieh
Women	Japan; Makiko Furukawa; Keiko Hama; Takako Hino; Noriko Honda; Rumiko Igarashi; Takako Iida; Michiko Ito; Nobuko Kishida; Yukiyo Kojima; Hisae Matsumoto; Sonomi Sakai; Michiko Saotome	South Korea; Choi Jung-sook; Hong Nam-sun; Huh Joo-ok; Hwang Kyu-ok; Kim Koon-ja; Lee Choon-il; Lee Keun-soo; Moon Kyung-sook; Ryoo Choon-ja; Suh Hee-sook; Yang Jin-soo; Yoo Myung-ja	Iran; Leila Emami; Pari Fardi; Mina Fathi; Mehri Kharrazi; Ozra Malek; Rouhi Pandnavaz; Jaleh Seyed-Hadizadeh; Nasrin Shokoufi; Mary Terez Tot

== Medal table ==
Rank	Nation	Gold	Silver	Bronze	Total
1	Japan (JPN)	2	0	0	2
2	South Korea (KOR)	0	2	0	2
3	Iran (IRN)	0	0	2	2
Totals (3 entries)		2	2	2	6

== Final standing ==
=== Men ===
Rank	Team	Pld	W	L
1st place, gold medalist(s)	Japan	8	8	0
2nd place, silver medalist(s)	South Korea	8	7	1
3rd place, bronze medalist(s)	Iran	8	5	3
4	India	8	5	3
5	Indonesia	8	3	5
6	Thailand	8	2	6
7	Taiwan	8	6	2
8	Philippines	8	5	3
9	Pakistan	8	4	4
10	South Vietnam	8	2	6
11	Ceylon	8	1	7
12	Malaysia	8	0	8

=== Women ===
Rank	Team	Pld	W	L
1st place, gold medalist(s)	Japan	5	5	0
2nd place, silver medalist(s)	South Korea	5	4	1
3rd place, bronze medalist(s)	Iran	5	3	2
4	Philippines	5	2	3
5	Thailand	5	1	4
6	Burma	5	0	5
