= Volleyball at the 1968 Summer Olympics =

Volleyball at the Games of the XIX Olympiad
- Venue: Gimnasio Olímpico Juan de la Barrera, Palacio de los Deportes Juan Escutia and Revolution Ice Rink
- Dates: 13 – 26 October 1968
- No. of events: 2
- Competitors: 206 from 12 nations

Volleyball at the 1968 Summer Olympics was represented by two events: men's team and women's team. The Olympic Committee initially dropped volleyball for the 1968 Olympics, meeting protests.

== Medal table ==
Rank	Nation	Gold	Silver	Bronze	Total
1	Soviet Union	2	0	0	2
2	Japan	0	2	0	2
3	Czechoslovakia	0	0	1	1
3	Poland	0	0	1	1
Totals (4 entries)		2	2	2	6

== Medal summary ==
Event	Gold	Silver	Bronze
Men's indoor	Soviet Union; Eduard Sibiryakov; Yuri Poyarkov; Georgi Mondzolevsky; Valeri Kravchenko; Volodymyr Byelyayev; Yevgeni Lapinsky; Ivan Bugaenkov; Oleg Antropov; Vasilius Matushevas; Viktor Mikhalchuk; Boris Tereshchuk; Vladimir Ivanov	Japan; Masayuki Minami; Katsutoshi Nekoda; Mamoru Shiragami; Isao Koizumi; Kenji Kimura; Yasuaki Mitsumori; Naohiro Ikeda; Jungo Morita; Tadayoshi Yokota; Seiji Oko; Tetsuo Satō; Kenji Shimaoka	Czechoslovakia; Bohumil Golián; Antonin Prochazka; Petr Kop; Jiri Svoboda; Josef Musil; Lubomir Zajisek; Josef Smolka; Vladimir Petlak; Frantisek Sokol; Zdenek Groessel; Pavel Schenk; Drahomir Koudelka
Women's indoor	Soviet Union; Lyudmila Buldakova; Lyudmila Mikhailkovskaya; Tatyana Veinberga; Vera Lantratova; Vera Galushka-Duyunova; Tatyana Sarycheva; Tatyana Ponyaeva-Tretyakova; Nina Smoleeva; Inna Ryskal; Galina Leontyeva; Roza Salikhova; Valentina Kamenek-Vinogradova	Japan; Setsuko Yosjida; Suzue Takayama; Toyoko Iwahara; Youko Kasahara; Aiko Onozawa; Yukiyo Kojima; Sachiko Fukanaka; Kunie Shishikura; Setsuko Inoue; Sumie Oinuma; Makiko Furakawa; Keiko Hama	Poland; Elżbieta Porzec; Zofia Szczęśniewska; Wanda Wiecha; Barbara Hermela-Niemczyk; Krystyna Ostromęcka; Krystyna Krupa; Jadwiga Książek; Józefa Ledwig; Krystyna Jakubowska; Lidia Chmielnicka; Krystyna Czajkowska; Halina Aszkiełowicz
