= 1967 FIVB Women's Volleyball World Championship =

1967 FIVB Women's World Championship
Tournament details
- Host country: Japan
- City: Tokyo
- Dates: 25–29 January
- Teams: 4
- Venue: Nippon Budokan

Final positions
- Champions: Japan (2nd title)
- Runners-up: United States
- Third place: South Korea
- Fourth place: Peru

The 1967 FIVB Women's World Championship was the fifth edition of the tournament, organised by the world's governing body, the FIVB. It was held from 25 to 29 January 1967 at the Nippon Budokan in Tokyo, Japan.

== Background ==
Since its inaugural edition in 1952, the women's and men's World Championships were hosted by the same country. The FIVB decided to split the tournaments, awarding men's and women's to different countries, for 1966 the men's was held in Czechoslovakia and the women's was planned to be held in Lima, Peru between 12 and 29 October. Lima withdrew as organizer and the tournament was delayed until a new host could be found. With Japan chosen as host (the first time the World Championships were played in Asia), the tournament went ahead in January 1967. Due to international political tensions caused by the Cold War, hosts Japan warned it would not display the flags nor have the national anthems of North Korea and East Germany played. Both teams together with the Eastern Bloc countries (Czechoslovakia, Hungary, Poland, Soviet Union) and China forfeited the tournament, leaving only four teams as participants.

== Teams ==
- Japan
- Peru
- South Korea
- United States

== Squads ==
Source:

== Venue ==
| Single pool | Host city in Japan |
| Tokyo | Host city in Japan |
| Nippon Budokan | Host city in Japan |
| Capacity: 14,000 | Host city in Japan |

== Format ==
The tournament was played in a single round-robin format, all four participant teams in a single pool and played each other once.

== Results ==
| Pos | Team | Pld | W | L | Pts | SW | SL | SR | SPW | SPL | SPR |
|---|---|---|---|---|---|---|---|---|---|---|---|
| 1 | Japan | 3 | 3 | 0 | 6 | 9 | 0 | MAX | 135 | 37 | 3.649 |
| 2 | United States | 3 | 2 | 1 | 5 | 6 | 5 | 1.200 | 128 | 126 | 1.016 |
| 3 | South Korea | 3 | 1 | 2 | 4 | 4 | 6 | 0.667 | 96 | 128 | 0.750 |
| 4 | Peru | 3 | 0 | 3 | 3 | 1 | 9 | 0.111 | 78 | 146 | 0.534 |

| Date | | Score | | Set 1 | Set 2 | Set 3 | Set 4 | Set 5 | Total |
|---|---|---|---|---|---|---|---|---|---|
| 25 Jan | United States | 3–1 | South Korea | 15–10 | 15–7 | 7–15 | 15–9 | | 52–41 |
| 25 Jan | Japan | 3–0 | Peru | 15–1 | 15–5 | 15–1 | | | 45–7 |
| 27 Jan | United States | 3–1 | Peru | 15–3 | 11–15 | 15–9 | 15–13 | | 56–40 |
| 27 Jan | Japan | 3–0 | South Korea | 15–3 | 15–3 | 15–4 | | | 45–10 |
| 29 Jan | South Korea | 3–0 | Peru | 15–11 | 15–9 | 15–11 | | | 45–31 |
| 29 Jan | Japan | 3–0 | United States | 15–12 | 15–0 | 15–8 | | | 45–20 |

== Final standing ==
| Rank | Team |
|---|---|
| 1st place, gold medalist(s) | Japan |
| 2nd place, silver medalist(s) | United States |
| 3rd place, bronze medalist(s) | South Korea |
| 4 | Peru |

| Qualified for the 1968 Olympic Games as reigning champions |
| Qualified for the 1968 Olympic Games |

1967 Women's World champions

Japan
2nd title

Team roster
Toyoko Iwahara, Wakako Kumasaka, Katsumi Matsumura, Sumie Oinuma, Aiko Onozawa, Setsuko Sasaki, Eiko Haga, Yoko Shinozaki, Kunie Shishikura, Suzue Takayama, Teruko Yamada, Setsuko Yoshida
Head coach
Sigeo Yamada
