= Setsuko =

- Pronunciation: Sets'ko
- Gender: Female

Origin
- Origin: Japanese
- Meaning: It can have a number of different meanings depending on the kanji used. One possibility is "Snow Child".
- Region of origin: Japanese

Setsuko (written: 節子 or せつこ in hiragana) is a feminine Japanese given name. Notable people with the name include:

- Matsudaira Setsuko (松平 節子), later Princess Chichibu (秩父宮妃勢津子) of Japan
- Hara Setsuko (原 節子), actress
- Setsuko Inoue (井上 節子; born 1946), Japanese volleyball player
- Setsuko Karasuma (烏丸 せつこ; born 1955), Japanese actress and model
- Setsuko Klossowska de Rola (born 1942), Japanese painter
- Setsuko Kobori Japanese table tennis player
- Koizumi Setsuko (小泉節子, 1868–1932), wife of Lafcadio Hearn
- Setsuko Matsunaga Nishi (1921–2012), Japanese pioneering community activist and researcher
- Migishi Setsuko (三岸 節子; 1905–1999), Japanese yōga painter
- Setsuko Sasaki (佐々木 節子; born 1944), Japanese volleyball player
- Setsuko Shimada (島田 節子; born 1938), Japanese swimmer
- Setsuko Shinoda (篠田 節子; born 1955), Japanese novelist
- Setsuko Thurlow (サーロー 節子; born 1932), Japanese–Canadian nuclear disarmament campaigner
- Setsuko Tsumura (節子 津村; born 1928), Japanese novelist
- Setsuko Yoshida (吉田 節子; born 1942), Japanese volleyball player

== Fictional characters ==
- Setsuko, a character in the film Grave of the Fireflies
- Setsuko Ohara, a character in the game Super Robot Wars Z
