= Yonehara =

Yonehara (written: 米原) is a Japanese surname. Notable people with the surname include:

- Hideyuki Yonehara (米原 秀幸, born 1967), Japanese manga artist
- Kousuke Yonehara (米原 幸佑, born 1986), Japanese singer and actor
- Kunio Yonehara (米原 邦夫, born 1941), Japanese water polo player
- Mari Yonehara (米原 万里, 1950–2006), Japanese translator and writer
- Shusuke Yonehara (米原 秀亮, born 1998), Japanese footballer
- Yu Yonehara (米原 祐, born 1994), Japanese footballer

== See also ==
- Maibara (米原)
