= Shishikura =

Shishikura (written: 宍倉) is a Japanese surname. Notable people with the surname include:

- Kunie Shishikura (宍倉 邦枝) (born 1946), Japanese volleyball player
- Mitsuhiro Shishikura (宍倉 光広) (born 1960), Japanese mathematician
