= Katsuaki =

- Gender: Male

Origin
- Origin: Japanese
- Meaning: Different meanings depending on the kanji used

Katsuaki (written: 勝晙, 勝昭, 勝明, 捷昭) is a masculine Japanese given name. Notable people with the name include:

- Katsuaki Asai (浅井 勝昭; born 1942), Japanese aikidoka
- Itakura Katsuaki (板倉 勝晙) (1784–1804), Japanese daimyō
- Kitanofuji Katsuaki (北の富士 勝昭; born 1942), Japanese sumo wrestler
- Katsuaki Matsumoto (松本 勝明; born 1928), Japanese cyclist
- Katsuaki Satō (佐藤 勝昭; born 1946), Japanese karateka
- Katsuaki Susa (須佐 勝明; born 1984), Japanese boxer
- Katsuaki Tashiro (田代 勝明; born 1937), Japanese modern pentathlete
- Katsuaki Watanabe (渡辺 捷昭; born 1942), Japanese chief executive
