= Suzue =

- Gender: Female

Origin
- Origin: Japanese
- Meaning: Different meanings depending on the kanji used

Suzue (written: 鈴江 or すずえ in hiragana) is a feminine Japanese given name. Notable people with the name include:

- Suzue Miuchi (美内 すずえ; born 1951), Japanese manga artist
- Suzue Takayama (高山 鈴江; born 1946), Japanese volleyball player
