= Suh Hee-sook =

South Korean volleyball player (born 1947)

Personal information
- Nationality: South Korean
- Born: 21 November 1947 (age 77); Busan, South Korea

Sport
- Sport: Volleyball

Suh Hee-sook (born 21 November 1947) is a South Korean volleyball player. She competed in the women's tournament at the 1968 Summer Olympics.
