= Hwang Kyu-ok =

South Korean volleyball player (born 1948)

Personal information
- Nationality: South Korean
- Born: 29 May 1948 (age 77) Daejeon, South Korea

Sport
- Sport: Volleyball

Hwang Kyu-ok (born 29 May 1948) is a South Korean volleyball player. She competed in the women's tournament at the 1968 Summer Olympics.
