= Volleyball at the 1966 Asian Games – Women's tournament =

Women at the 1966 Asian Games
- Venue: Thammasat Gymnasium
- Date: 10–19 December 1966
- Nations: 6

Medalists
| gold medal | Japan |
| silver medal | South Korea |
| bronze medal | Iran |

The 1966 Women's Asian Games Volleyball Tournament was the 2nd edition of the event, organized by the Asian governing body, the AVC. It was held in Bangkok, Thailand from 10 to 19 December 1966.

== Results ==
| Pos | Team | Pld | W | L | Pts | SW | SL | SR |
|---|---|---|---|---|---|---|---|---|
| 1 | Japan | 5 | 5 | 0 | 10 | 15 | 0 | MAX |
| 2 | South Korea | 5 | 4 | 1 | 9 | 12 | 4 | 3.000 |
| 3 | Iran | 5 | 3 | 2 | 8 | 9 | 8 | 1.125 |
| 4 | Philippines | 5 | 2 | 3 | 7 | 9 | 10 | 0.900 |
| 5 | Thailand | 5 | 1 | 4 | 6 | 4 | 12 | 0.333 |
| 6 | Burma | 5 | 0 | 5 | 5 | 0 | 15 | 0.000 |

Source: Results

| Date | | Score | | Set 1 | Set 2 | Set 3 | Set 4 | Set 5 | Total |
|---|---|---|---|---|---|---|---|---|---|
| 10 Dec | Philippines | 3–0 | Burma | | | | | | |
| 10 Dec | South Korea | 3–0 | Thailand | | | | | | |
| 11 Dec | Japan | 3–0 | Iran | | | | | | |
| 11 Dec | South Korea | 3–1 | Philippines | | | | | | |
| 12 Dec | Burma | 0–3 | Iran | 11–15 | 2–15 | 7–15 | | | 20–45 |
| 12 Dec | Japan | 3–0 | Thailand | | | | | | |
| 13 Dec | Japan | 3–0 | South Korea | | | | | | |
| 13 Dec | Philippines | 2–3 | Iran | 15–6 | 15–9 | 8–15 | 12–15 | 9–15 | 59–60 |
| 14 Dec | Japan | 3–0 | Philippines | | | | | | |
| 14 Dec | Thailand | 3–0 | Burma | | | | | | |
| 15 Dec | Thailand | 0–3 | Iran | 13–15 | 1–15 | 3–15 | | | 17–45 |
| 16 Dec | South Korea | 3–0 | Burma | | | | | | |
| 17 Dec | Philippines | 3–1 | Thailand | 15–8 | 15–8 | 13–15 | 15–9 | | 58–40 |
| 18 Dec | Japan | 3–0 | Burma | | | | | | |
| 19 Dec | South Korea | 3–0 | Iran | 15–8 | 15–6 | 15–4 | | | 45–18 |

== Final standing ==
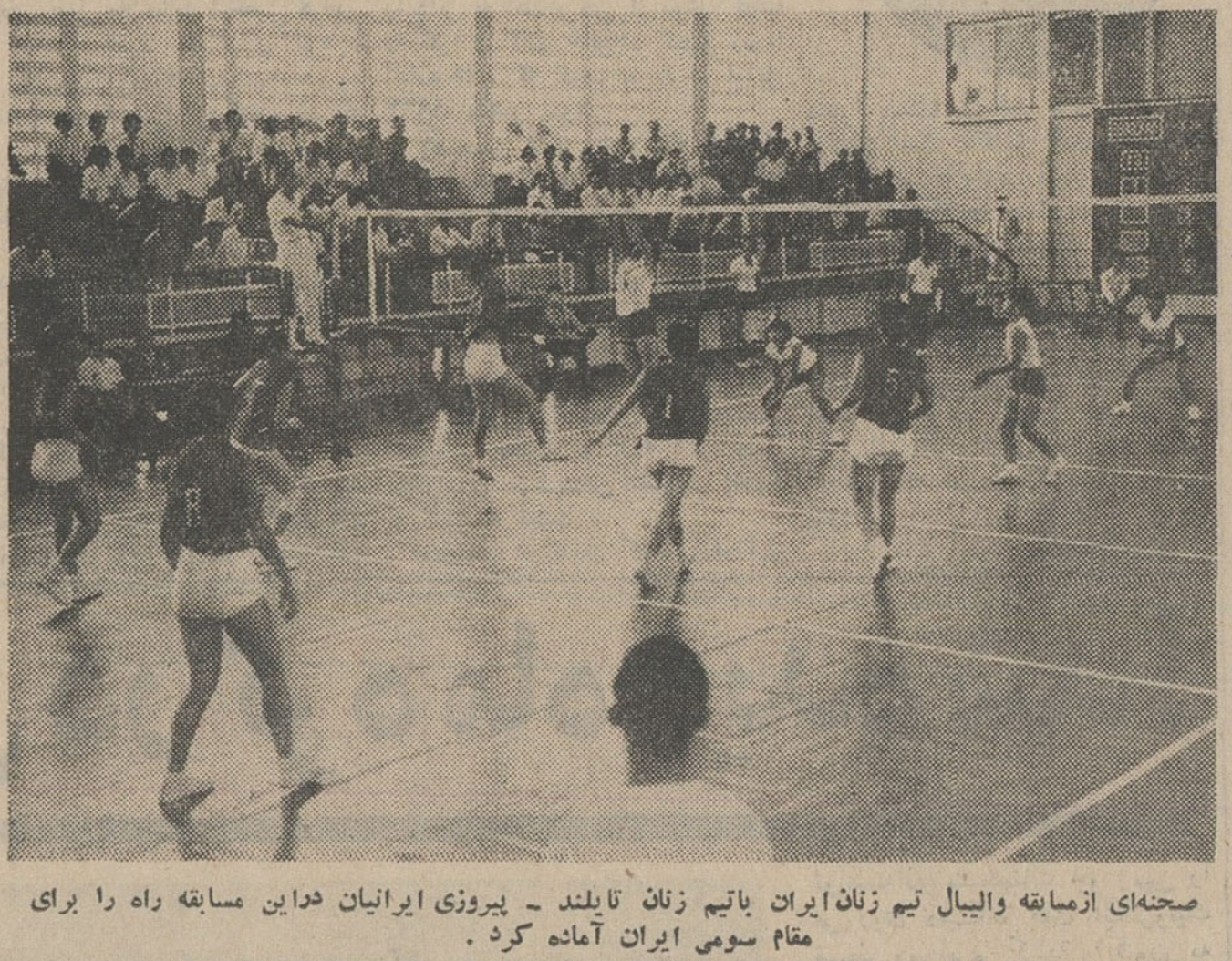
The game between Iran and Thailand in the tournament. Iran secured its bronze medal by winning against Thailand in this game.

| Rank | Team | Pld | W | L |
|---|---|---|---|---|
| 1st place, gold medalist(s) | Japan | 5 | 5 | 0 |
| 2nd place, silver medalist(s) | South Korea | 5 | 4 | 1 |
| 3rd place, bronze medalist(s) | Iran | 5 | 3 | 2 |
| 4 | Philippines | 5 | 2 | 3 |
| 5 | Thailand | 5 | 1 | 4 |
| 6 | Burma | 5 | 0 | 5 |
