= Revolution Ice Rink =

Arena in Mexico City, Mexico

Revolution Ice Rink (Spanish: Pista Revolución) was an indoor arena located in Mexico City. The rink hosted some of the volleyball competitions for the 1968 Summer Olympics.

The arena also hosted a number of wrestling events. It was demolished in 1997. During demolition, the roof unexpectedly caved in injuring several workers.

Today, the arena's site is occupied by a gas station.
