= Drahomír Koudelka =

Czech volleyball player (1946–1992)

Personal information
- Full name: Drahomír Koudelka
- Nationality: Polish
- Born: 26 May 1946; Czechoslovakia
- Died: 19 August 1992 (aged 46); Czechoslovakia
Honours
Men's volleyball
Representing Czechoslovakia
Olympic Games
Bronze medal – third place	1968 Mexico City	Team

Drahomír Koudelka (26 May 1946 – 19 August 1992) was a Czech volleyball player who competed for Czechoslovakia in the 1968 Summer Olympics, in the 1972 Summer Olympics, and in the 1976 Summer Olympics.

He was born in Krasová, Blansko District.

In 1968, he was part of the Czechoslovak team which won the bronze medal in the Olympic tournament. He played all nine matches.

Four years later, he finished sixth with the Czechoslovak team in the 1972 Olympic tournament. He played six matches.

At the 1976 Games, he was a member of the Czechoslovak team which finished fifth in the Olympic tournament. He played all six matches.
