= Junji Yuasa =

Japanese diver

Personal information
- Nationality: Japanese
- Born: 12 October 1944 (age 80); Osaka, Japan

Sport
- Sport: Diving

Junji Yuasa (湯浅純二, Yuasa Junji, born 12 October 1944) is a Japanese diver. He competed at the 1968 Summer Olympics and the 1972 Summer Olympics.
