= Jiří Svoboda (volleyball) =

Czech volleyball player (born 1941)

Personal information
- Nickname: Jiří Svoboda
- Nationality: Czech
- Born: 19 April 1941 (age 85) Zubří, Protectorate of Bohemia and Moravia
- Height: 186 cm (6 ft 1 in)
Honours
Men's volleyball
Representing Czechoslovakia
Olympic Games
Bronze medal – third place	1968 Mexico City	Team

Jiří Svoboda (born 19 April 1941) is a Czech former volleyball player who competed for Czechoslovakia in the 1968 Summer Olympics.

Svoboda was born in Zubří.

In 1968, Svoboda was part of the Czechoslovak team that won the bronze medal in the Olympic tournament. He played all nine matches.
