= Zdeněk Groessl =

Czech volleyball player (1941–2023)

Personal information
- Full name: Zdeněk Groessl
- Nationality: Czech
- Born: 8 September 1941 Plzeň, Protectorate of Bohemia and Moravia
- Died: 17 November 2023 (aged 82)
Honours
Men's volleyball
Representing Czechoslovakia
Olympic Games
Bronze medal – third place	1968 Mexico City	Team

Zdeněk Groessl (8 September 1941 – 17 November 2023) was a Czech volleyball player who competed for Czechoslovakia in the 1968 and the 1972 Summer Olympics.

== Biography ==
Groessl was born in Plzeň on 8 September 1941. In 1968 he was part of the Czechoslovak team which won the bronze medal in the Olympic tournament. He played all nine matches.

Four years later he finished sixth with the Czechoslovak team in the 1972 Olympic tournament. He played six matches.

Groessl died on 17 November 2023, at the age of 82.
