= Josef Smolka =

Czech volleyball player (1939–2020)

Olympic medal record

Men's Volleyball
Bronze medal – third place	1968 Mexico City	Team

Josef Smolka (22 March 1939, Troubky – 1 June 2020) was a Czech volleyball player who competed for Czechoslovakia in the 1968 Summer Olympics. In 1968 he was part of the Czechoslovak team which won the bronze medal in the Olympic tournament. He played seven matches.
