= Lubomír Zajíček =

Czech volleyball player (1945–2013)

Personal information
- Nationality: Czech
- Born: 15 February 1946; Brno, Czechoslovakia
- Died: 14 May 2013 (aged 67)
- Height: 186 cm (6 ft 1 in)
Honours
Men's Volleyball
Bronze medal – third place	1968 Mexico City	Team

Lubomír Zajíček (15 February 1946 – 14 May 2013) was a Czech volleyball player who competed for Czechoslovakia in the 1968 Summer Olympics and in the 1972 Summer Olympics. He was born in Bystrc. In 1968, he was part of the Czechoslovak team that won the bronze medal in the Olympic tournament. He played two matches. Four years later, he finished sixth with the Czechoslovak team in the 1972 Olympic tournament. He played four matches.
