= Vladimír Petlák =

Czech volleyball player (1946–1999)

Olympic medal record

Men's Volleyball
Bronze medal – third place	1968 Mexico City	Team

Vladimír Petlák (21 February 1946 – 2 February 1999) was a Czech volleyball player who competed for Czechoslovakia in the 1968 Summer Olympics, in the 1972 Summer Olympics, and in the 1976 Summer Olympics.

He was born in Kuřim and died in Ústí nad Labem.

In 1968 he was part of the Czechoslovak team which won the bronze medal in the Olympic tournament. He played all nine matches.

Four years later he finished sixth with the Czechoslovak team in the 1972 Olympic tournament. He played all seven matches.

At the 1976 Games he was a member of the Czechoslovak team which finished fifth in the Olympic tournament. He played all six matches.
