= František Sokol =

Czech volleyball player (1939–2011)

Personal information
- Nationality: Czech
- Born: 5 February 1939; Tišnov, Protectorate of Bohemia and Moravia
- Died: 11 October 2011 (aged 72); Ostrava, Czech Republic

National team
Czechoslovakia men's national volleyball team
Honours
Men's volleyball
Representing Czechoslovakia
Olympic Games
Bronze medal – third place	1968 Mexico City	Team

František Sokol (5 February 1939, in Tišnov – 11 October 2011, in Ostrava) is a Czech former volleyball player who competed for Czechoslovakia in the 1968 Summer Olympics.

In 1968 he was part of the Czechoslovak team which won the bronze medal in the Olympic tournament. He played eight matches.
