= Toshio Fukui =

Japanese modern pentathlete (born 1943)

Personal information
- Born: 2 January 1943 (age 83) Shimane Prefecture, Japan

Sport
- Sport: Modern pentathlon

Toshio Fukui (福井 敏男, Fukui Toshio; born 2 January 1943) is a Japanese modern pentathlete. He competed at the 1968 Summer Olympics in Mexico.
