= Barbara Niemczyk =

Polish volleyball player (born 1942)

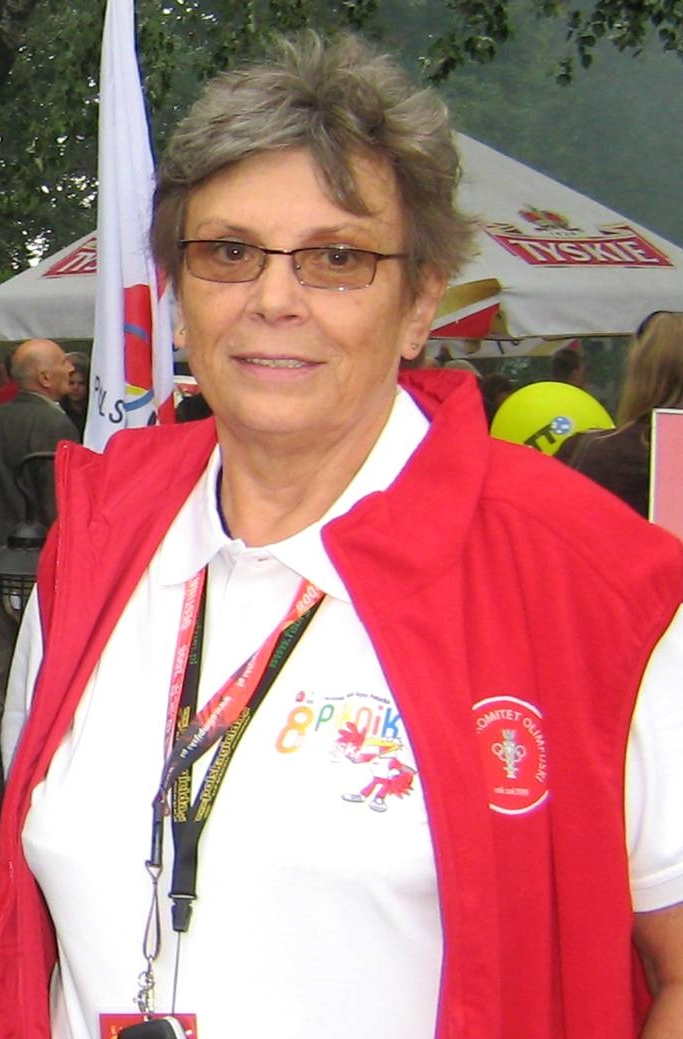

Personal information
- Full name: Barbara Wiesława Hermel-Niemczyk
- Nationality: Polish
- Born: 13 November 1942 (age 83); Łódź, Poland
- Height: 1.74 m (5 ft 9 in)

National team
| 1964–1976 | Poland (172) |
Honours
Representing Poland
Women's volleyball
Olympic Games
| Bronze medal – third place | 1964 Tokyo |
| Bronze medal – third place | 1968 Mexico |
European Championship
| Silver medal – second place | 1967 Turkey |
| Bronze medal – third place | 1971 Italy |
- Last updated: 26 June 2015

Barbara Wiesława Hermel-Niemczyk (born 13 November 1942) is a former Polish volleyball player, a member of Poland women's national volleyball team in 1964–1976, a bronze medalist of the Olympic Games (Tokyo 1964, Mexico 1968), medalist of the European Championship (silver in 1967, bronze in 1971, five-time Polish Champion (1968, 1971,1972, 1973, 1976), Italian Champion (1977).

== Personal life ==
She was married to Andrzej Niemczyk – head coach, who led Polish women's national volleyball team to two titles of European Champions (2003, 2005). They have daughter Małgorzata Niemczyk (born 1969), who was also volleyball player, European Champion 2003 .
