= Józefa Ledwig =

Polish volleyball player

Personal information
- Full name: Józefa Ledwig-Bęben
- Nationality: Polish
- Born: 18 April 1935 (age 91); Szerzyny, Poland
- Height: 1.74 m (5 ft 9 in)

National team
1959–1970	Poland (216)
Honours
Women's volleyball
Representing Poland
Olympic Games
Bronze medal – third place	1964 Tokyo
Bronze medal – third place	1968 Mexico
World Championship
Bronze medal – third place	1962 Soviet Union
European Championship
Silver medal – second place	1963 Romania
Silver medal – second place	1967 Turkey
- Last updated: 26 June 2015

Józefa Ledwig-Bęben (born 18 April 1935) is a former Polish volleyball player, a member of Poland women's national volleyball team in 1959–1970, a bronze medalist of the Olympic Games (Tokyo 1964, Mexico 1968), a bronze medalist of the World Championship 1962 and silver medalist of the European Championship (1963, 1967), three-time Polish Champion (1967, 1969, 1970).
