= Wanda Wiecha =

Polish volleyball player (born 1946)

Personal information
- Full name: Wanda Wiecha-Wanot
- Nationality: Polish
- Born: 14 May 1946 (age 80) Dillingen an der Donau, Germany

Volleyball information

National team
- Years: Team
- 1965–1971: Poland (95)
Honours
Women's volleyball
Representing Poland
Olympic Games
Bronze medal – third place	1968 Mexico
European Championship
Silver medal – second place	1967 Turkey
- Updated on 26 June 2015

Wanda Wiecha-Wanot (born 14 May 1946) is a former female Polish volleyball player, a member of Poland women's national volleyball team in 1965–1971, a bronze medalist of the Olympic Games Mexico 1968, silver medalist of the European Championship 1967, three-time Polish Champion (1967, 1969, 1970).
