= Yasuaki Mitsumori =

Japanese volleyball player (born 1946)

Personal information
- Nickname: Mitsumori Yasuaki
- Nationality: Japanese
- Born: November 23, 1946 (age 79) Tokyo, Japan

Volleyball information

National team
- Years: Team
- –: Japan men's national volleyball team
Honours
Men's volleyball
Representing Japan
Olympic Games
| Silver medal – second place | 1968 Mexico City | Team |

Yasuaki Mitsumori (三森 泰明, Mitsumori Yasuaki; born November 23, 1946) is a Japanese former volleyball player who competed in the 1968 Summer Olympics.

In 1968 he was part of the Japanese team which won the silver medal in the Olympic tournament. He played all nine matches.
