= Valentina Kamenyok-Vinogradova =

Soviet volleyball player (1943–2002)

Personal information
- Full name: Valentina Alekseyevna Kamenyok-Vinogradova
- Born: 17 May 1943 Moscow, Russian SFSR, Soviet Union
- Died: 17 July 2002 (aged 59)
- Height: 5 ft 7 in (1.70 m)
- Weight: 163 lb (74 kg)
Honours
Women's volleyball
Representing the Soviet Union
Olympic Games
Gold medal – first place	1968 Mexico City	Team competition
Silver medal – second place	1964 Tokyo	Team competition

Valentina Kamenyok-Vinogradova (17 May 1943 – 17 July 2002) was a Soviet volleyball player. Born in Moscow, she competed for the Soviet Union at the 1964 and 1968 Summer Olympics.
