= Tetsuo Satō (volleyball) =

Japanese volleyball player (1949–2025)

Olympic medal record

Men's Volleyball
Gold medal – first place	1972 Munich	Team
Silver medal – second place	1968 Mexico City	Team

Tetsuo Satō (佐藤 哲夫, Satō Tetsuo; March 12, 1949 – June 11, 2025) was a Japanese volleyball player who competed in the 1968 Summer Olympics, in the 1972 Summer Olympics, and in the 1976 Summer Olympics. He was born in Fukushima Prefecture.

In 1968, he was part of the Japanese team which won the silver medal in the Olympic tournament. He played two matches. Four years later, in 1972, he won the gold medal with the Japanese team in the 1972 Olympic tournament. He played one match. At the 1976 Games, he was a member of the Japanese team which finished fourth in the Olympic tournament. He played all five matches.

Tetsuo Satō died on June 11, 2025, at the age of 76.
