= Halina Aszkiełowicz-Wojno =

Polish volleyball player (1947–2018)

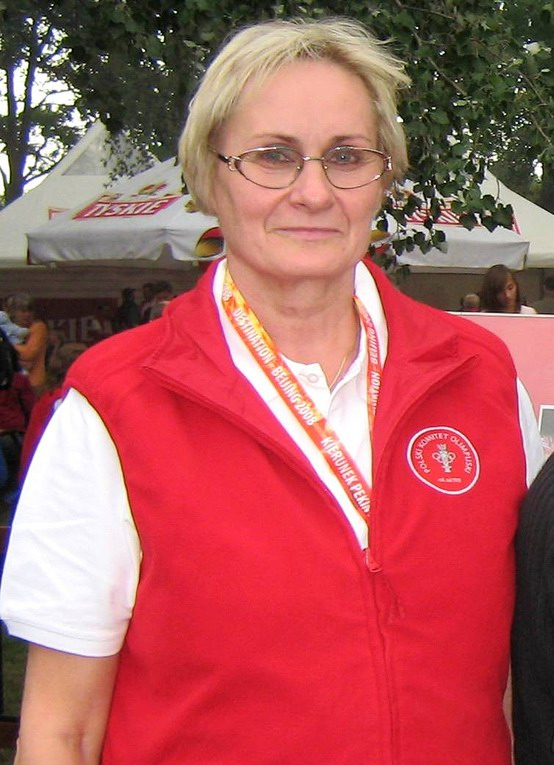

Personal information
- Full name: Halina Aszkiełowicz-Wojno
- Nationality: Polish
- Born: 4 February 1947; Słupsk, Poland
- Died: 22 June 2018 (aged 71)

Volleyball information
- Position: Middle-blocker

National team
1965–1973	Poland (177)
Honours
Representing Poland
Women's volleyball
Olympic Games
Bronze medal – third place	1968 Mexico
European Championship
Silver medal – second place	1967 Turkey
Bronze medal – third place	1971 Italy
- Last updated: 26 June 2015

Halina Aszkiełowicz-Wojno (4 February 1947 – 22 June 2018) was a Polish volleyball player, a member of Poland women's national volleyball team in 1965–1973, a bronze medalist of the Olympic Games Mexico 1968, medalist of the European Championship (silver in 1967, bronze in 1971).
