= Katsuaki Tashiro =

Japanese modern pentathlete

Personal information
- Born: 6 November 1937 (age 88) Nagasaki, Japan

Sport
- Sport: Modern pentathlon

Katsuaki Tashiro (田代 勝明, Tashiro Katsuaki; born 6 November 1937) is a Japanese modern pentathlete. He competed at the 1968 Summer Olympics.
