= Galina Leontyeva =

Russian volleyball player

Personal information
- Full name: Galina Aleksandrovna Leontyeva (Yelintskaya)
- Born: 6 November 1941; Lykoshino, Yaroslavl Oblast, Russian SFSR, USSR
- Died: 4 February 2016 (aged 74); Saint Petersburg, Russia
- Height: 1.70 m (5 ft 7 in)
Honours
Women's volleyball
Representing the Soviet Union
Olympic Games
Gold medal – first place	1968 Mexico City	Team
Gold medal – first place	1972 Munich	Team
World Championship
Gold medal – first place	1970 Bulgaria	Team

Galina Aleksandrovna Leontyeva (Russian: Гали́на Алекса́ндровна Лео́нтьева; 6 November 1941 – 4 February 2016) was a Russian volleyball player who represented the USSR at the Olympics.
