= Krystyna Jakubowska =

Polish volleyball player (born 1942)

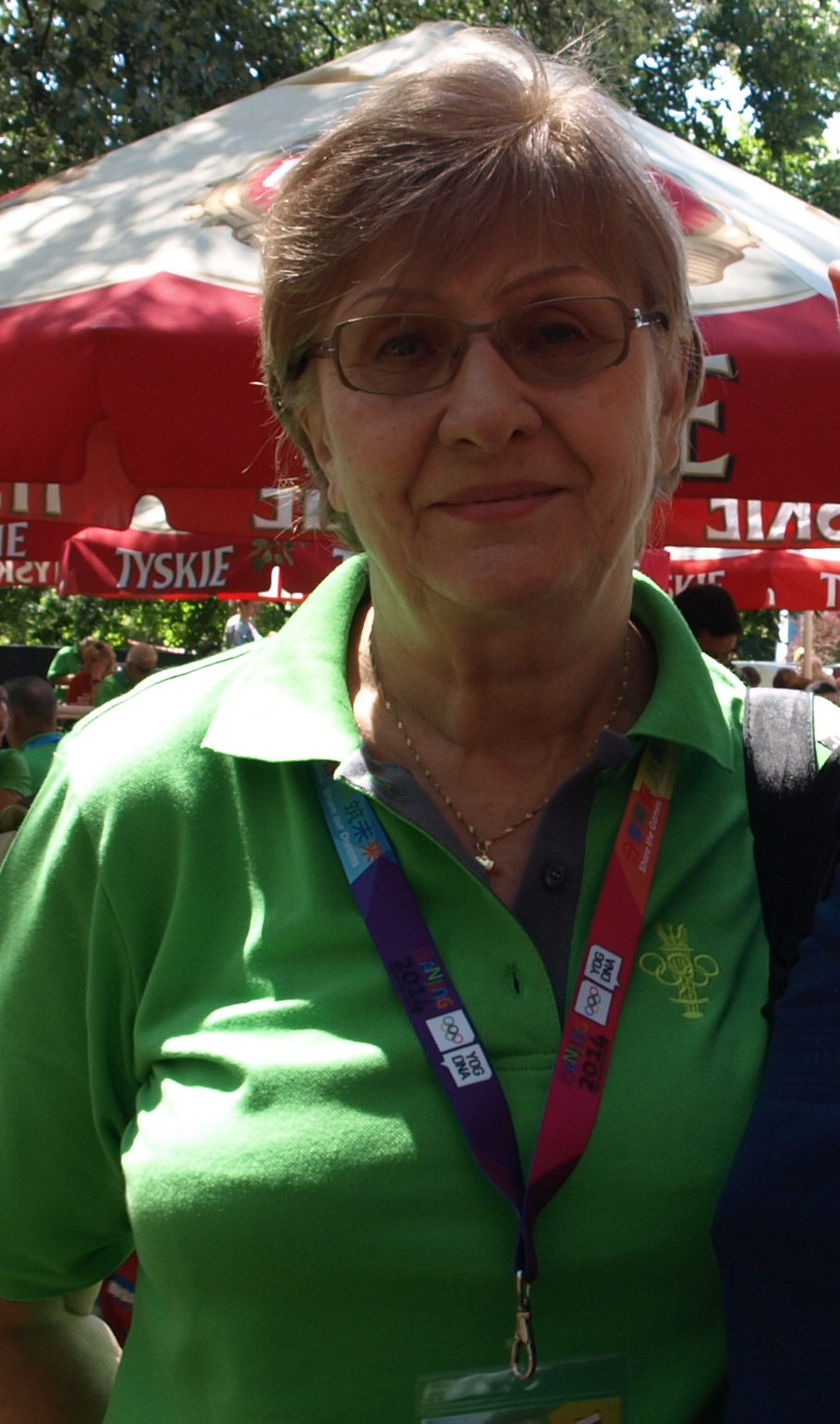

Personal information
- Full name: Krystyna Jakubowska-Tabaka
- Nationality: Polish
- Born: 15 December 1942 (age 83); Warsaw, Poland

National team
1961–1969	Poland (169)
Honours
Representing Poland
Women's volleyball
Olympic Games
Bronze medal – third place	1964 Tokyo
Bronze medal – third place	1968 Mexico
World Championship
Bronze medal – third place	1962 Soviet Union
European Championship
Silver medal – second place	1963 Romania
Silver medal – second place	1967 Turkey
- Last updated: 26 June 2015

Krystyna Jakubowska-Tabaka (born 15 December 1942) is a Polish former volleyball player. She was a member of Poland women's national volleyball team in 1961–1969, a bronze medalist of the Olympic Games (Tokyo 1964, Mexico 1968), a bronze medalist of the World Championship 1962 and silver medalist of the European Championship (1963, 1967).

== Career as player ==
=== National team ===
In 1962 she won bronze medal of World Championship, and one year later silver of European Championship 1963. In 1964 she took part in Olympic Games Tokyo 1964. She played in all five matches and Poland, including Jakubowska, won bronze medal in the Olympic tournament and four years later she repeated this success at Olympics 1968. In 1967 she achieved another silver of European Championship. She played in national team 169 times.
