= Seiji Oko =

Japanese volleyball player (born 1948)

Olympic medal record

Men's Volleyball
Gold medal – first place	1972 Munich	Team competition
Silver medal – second place	1968 Mexico City	Team competition

Seiji Oko (大古 誠司 Ōko Seiji , born 15 February 1948) is a former volleyball player from Japan, who was a member of the Japan Men's National Team that won the gold medal at the 1972 Summer Olympics and the silver medal at the 1968 Summer Olympics.

In 2004, he became an inductee of the Volleyball Hall of Fame in Holyoke, Massachusetts.

== National team ==
- 1968: 2nd place in the Olympic Games of Mexico City
- 1970: 3rd place in the World Championship
- 1972: 1st place in the Olympic Games of Munich
- 1974: 3rd place in the World Championship
- 1976: 4th place in the Olympic Games of Montreal
