= Vera Lantratova =

Soviet volleyball player (1947–2021)

Personal information
- Nationality: Soviet
- Born: 11 May 1947 Baku, Azerbaijan SSR, Soviet Union
- Died: 16 April 2021 (aged 76)
Honours
Women's volleyball
Representing the Soviet Union
Olympic Games
Gold medal – first place	1968 Mexico City	Team competition
Women's World Championship
Gold medal – first place	1970 Bulgaria	Team

Vera Lantratova (11 May 1947 – 16 April 2021) was a Soviet volleyball player for the USSR. She was born in Baku, Azerbaijan SSR. In 1968, as a member of the Soviet Union team, she won a gold medal in Mexico.
