= Lyudmila Mikhaylovskaya =

Soviet volleyball player

Personal information
- Full name: Lyudmila Nikolayevna Mikhaylovskaya (Makarova)
- Born: October 21, 1937 (age 89); Leningrad, Russian SFSR, Soviet Union
Honours
Women's volleyball
Representing Soviet Union
Olympic Games
| Gold medal – first place | 1968 Mexico City | Team |
World Championship
| Gold medal – first place | 1960 France | Team |
| Gold medal – first place | 1970 Bulgaria | Team |
| Silver medal – second place | 1962 Soviet Union | Team |
European Championship
| Gold medal – first place | 1963 Romania | Team |

Lyudmila Mikhaylovskaya (born October 21, 1937) is a former Russian volleyball player for the USSR who won a gold medal in the 1968 Summer Olympics in Mexico City, Mexico.
