= Elżbieta Porzec =

Polish volleyball player (1945–2019)

Personal information
- Full name: Elżbieta Porzec
- Nationality: Polish
- Born: 27 January 1945; Lublin, Poland
- Died: 7 June 2019 (aged 74)

National team
1963–1976	Poland (156)
Honours
Representing Poland
Women's volleyball
Olympic Games
Bronze medal – third place	1968 Mexico
- Last updated: 26 June 2015

Elżbieta Porzec (27 January 1945 – 7 June 2019) was a Polish volleyball player, a member of Poland women's national volleyball team in 1963–1976, a bronze medalist of the Olympic Games Mexico 1968.
