= Krystyna Krupa =

Polish volleyball player (born 1939)

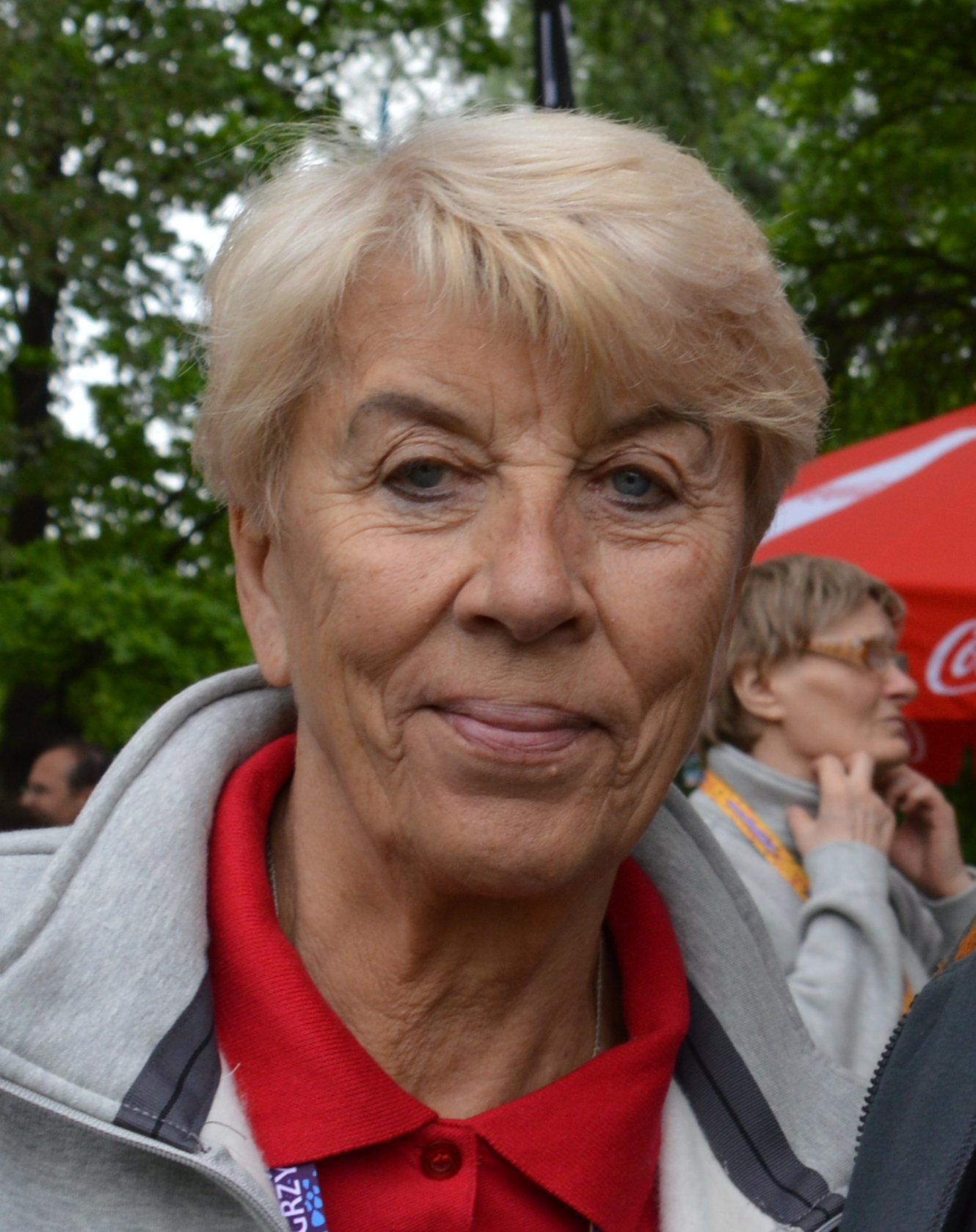

Personal information
- Full name: Krystyna Krupa (née Malinowska)
- Nationality: Polish
- Born: 15 January 1939 (age 87); Wyszki, Poland
- Height: 1.76 m (5 ft 9 in)

National team
1962–1968	Poland (131)
Honours
Representing Poland
Women's volleyball
Olympic Games
Bronze medal – third place	1964 Tokyo
Bronze medal – third place	1968 Mexico
World Championship
Bronze medal – third place	1962 Soviet Union
European Championship
Silver medal – second place	1963 Romania
Silver medal – second place	1967 Turkey
- Last updated: 26 June 2015

Krystyna Krupa (née Malinowska; born 15 January 1939) is a former Polish volleyball player, a member of Poland women's national volleyball team in 1962–1968, a bronze medalist of the Olympic Games (Tokyo 1964, Mexico 1968), a bronze medalist of the World Championship 1962 and silver medalist of the European Championship (1963, 1967).
