= Jadwiga Książek =

Polish volleyball player (1939–2019)

Personal information
- Nationality: Polish
- Born: Jadwiga Marko; 6 April 1939; Zelwa, Poland
- Died: 30 January 2019; Gdańsk, Poland
- Height: 1.78 m (5 ft 10 in)

National team
| 1959–1969 | Poland (144) |
Honours
Women's volleyball
Representing Poland
Olympic Games
| Bronze medal – third place | 1964 Tokyo |
| Bronze medal – third place | 1968 Mexico |
World Championship
| Bronze medal – third place | 1962 Soviet Union |
European Championship
| Silver medal – second place | 1963 Romania |
- Last updated: 26 June 2015

Jadwiga Książek (née Marko; born 6 April 1939, died 30 January 2019) was a Polish volleyball player, a member of Poland women's national volleyball team in 1959–1969, a bronze medalist of the Olympic Games (Tokyo 1964, Mexico 1968), a bronze medalist of the World Championship 1962 and silver medalist of the European Championship 1963, three-time Polish Champion (1964, 1965, 1966).
