= Tatyana Sarycheva =

Soviet volleyball player

Personal information
- Full name: Tatyana Filippovna Sarycheva
- Born: February 7, 1949 (age 77); New York City, New York, U.S.
Honours
Women's volleyball
Representing the Soviet Union
Olympic Games
Gold medal – first place	1968 Mexico City	Team competition
Gold medal – first place	1972 Munich	Team competition
Women's World Championship
Gold medal – first place	1970 Bulgaria	Team competition

Tatyana Sarycheva (born February 7, 1949) is a Russian former volleyball player for the USSR. Born in New York City, she competed for the Soviet Union at the 1968 and 1972 Summer Olympics.
