= Jungo Morita =

Japanese volleyball player (born 1947)

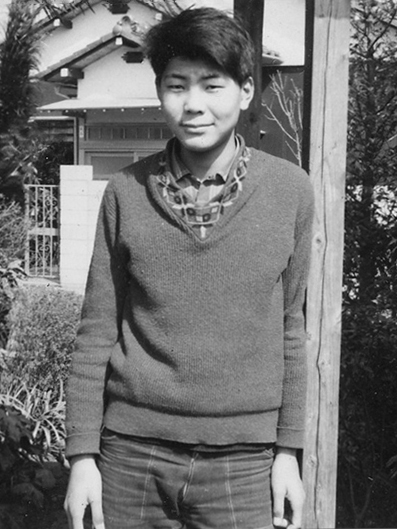
- Jungo Morita in 1960-2

Personal information
- Nationality: Japanese
- Born: August 9, 1947 (age 79); Tokyo, Japan
- Height: 1.94 m (6 ft 4 in)
- Weight: 85 kg (187 lb)

Career
Teams
	Nippon Kokan KK
Honours
Representing Japan
Olympic Games
Gold medal – first place	1972 Munich	Team
Silver medal – second place	1968 Mexico City	Team
World Championship
Bronze medal – third place	1970 Sofia	Team
Asian Games
Gold medal – first place	1966 Bangkok	Team
Gold medal – first place	1970 Bangkok	Team
Summer Universiade
Gold medal – first place	1967 Tokyo	Team

Jungo Morita (森田 淳悟, Morita Jungo; born August 9, 1947) is a retired volleyball player from Japan. He competed at the 1968 and 1972 Olympics and won a silver and a gold medal, respectively. In 2003, he was inducted into the Volleyball Hall of Fame in Holyoke, Massachusetts.

In 1966, Morita enrolled to the Nippon Physical Education University. The same year, he was selected for the national volleyball team and competed at the world championships, where Japan finished fifth, and at the Asian Games, where his team won the gold medal. The team was reorganized in 1966, and became much stronger within a few years, winning two Olympic medals in 1968 and 1972. Morita was a key frontline blocker, who had fast reflexes and good lateral movement, but he could also attack from the back row. He had a nickname "machine gun" because he could launch a split-second spiking attack with the setter. Morita was also known for a few other trademark attacking combinations.

After retiring from competitions, Morita was appointed as professor at the Japanese Sports and Science University. Later he also became manager of the national men's volleyball team and a member of the Fédération Internationale de Volleyball (FIVB) Coaching Commission. He was selected as one of the best male volleyball players of the 20th century by the FIVB.
