= Tatyana Veinberga =

Latvian volleyball player (1943–2008)

Tatjana Veinberga

Personal information
- Nationality: Latvian
- Born: September 4, 1943; Riga, Reichskommissariat Ostland
- Died: April 3, 2008 (aged 64)
Honours
Women's volleyball
Representing the Soviet Union
Olympic Games
Gold medal – first place	1968 Mexico City	Team competition

Tatjana Veinberga (September 4, 1943 – April 3, 2008), also known as Tatyana, is a Latvian former volleyball player for the Soviet Union. She was a member of the Soviet squad that won a gold medal in women's volleyball at the 1968 Summer Olympics in Mexico City, but she did not actually take part in any of the team's matches. To this day she remains as the first and only Latvian Olympic volleyball champion in history.

Veinberga played in the Soviet national team from 1967 to 1969, as well as represented the Latvian teams LVU, "Elektrons" and "Daugava" from 1961 til 1969.
