= Zofia Szczęśniewska =

Polish volleyball player (1943–1978)

Personal information
- Full name: Zofia Szcześniewska-Bryszewska
- Nationality: Polish
- Born: 31 August 1943 Warsaw, German-occupied Poland
- Died: 2 December 1978 (aged 35) Warsaw, Poland
- Height: 1.72 m (5 ft 8 in)

Volleyball information

National team
- Years: Team
- 1963–1970: Poland (164)
Honours
Representing Poland
Women's volleyball
Olympic Games
Bronze medal – third place	1964 Tokyo
Bronze medal – third place	1968 Mexico
European Championship
Silver medal – second place	1963 Romania
Silver medal – second place	1967 Turkey
- Updated on 26 June 2015

Zofia Szcześniewska-Bryszewska (31 August 1943 – 2 December 1978) was a former Polish volleyball player, a member of Poland women's national volleyball team in 1963–1970, a bronze medalist of the Olympic Games (Tokyo 1964, Mexico 1968), silver medalist of the European Championship (1963 and 1967), four-time Polish Champion (1963, 1964, 1965, 1966).
