= Krystyna Ostromęcka =

Polish volleyball player

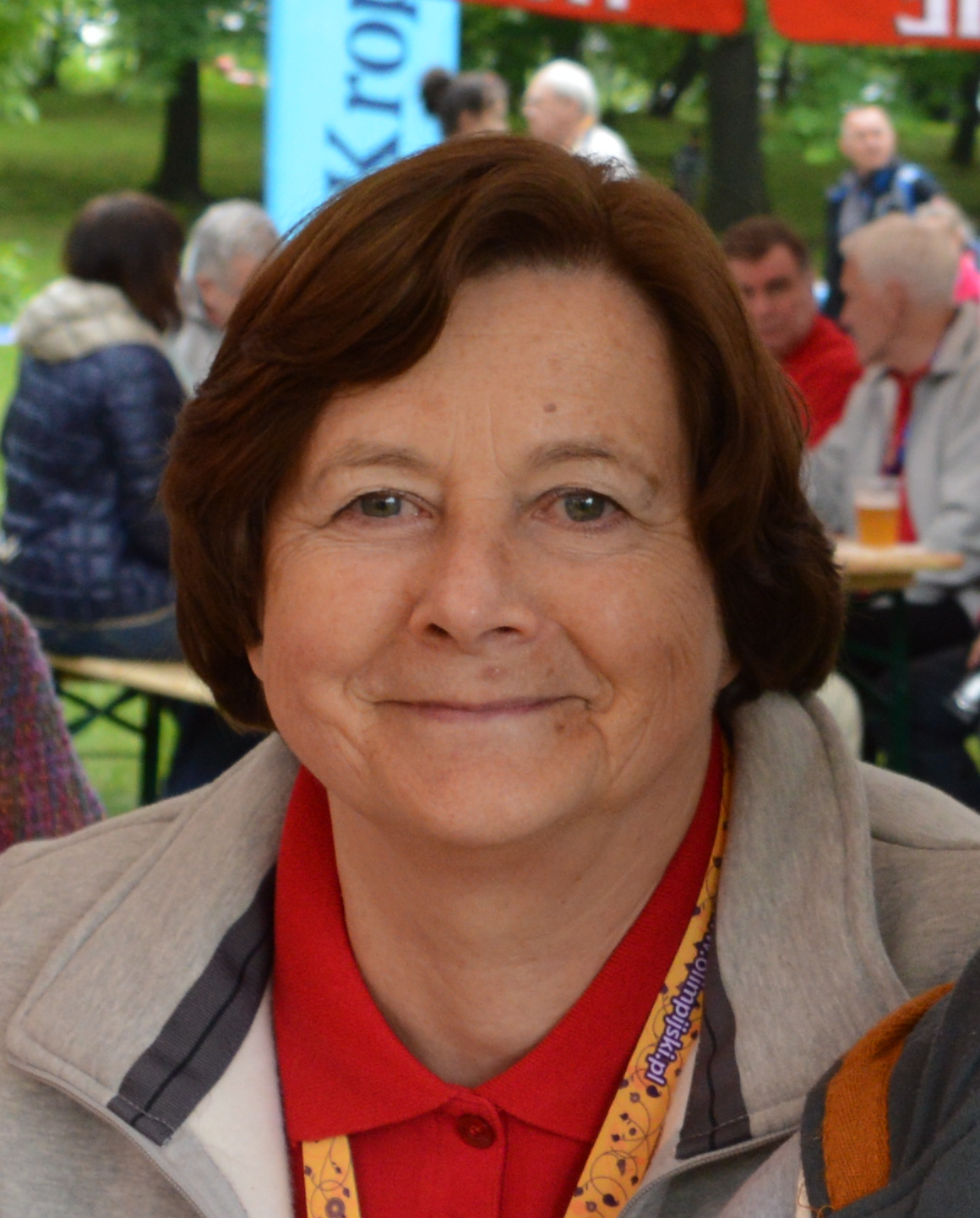

Personal information
- Full name: Krystyna Ostromęcka-Guryn
- Nationality: Polish
- Born: 12 March 1948 (age 78); Bydgoszcz, Poland
- Height: 1.76 m (5 ft 9 in)

National team
| 1968–1974 | Poland (143) |
Honours
Women's volleyball
Representing Poland
Olympic Games
| Bronze medal – third place | 1968 Mexico |
European Championship
| Bronze medal – third place | 1971 Italy |
- Last updated: 26 June 2015

Krystyna Ostromęcka-Guryn (born 12 March 1948) is a former Polish volleyball player, a member of Poland women's national volleyball team in 1968–1974, a bronze medalist of the Olympic Games Mexico 1968 and European Championship 1974).
