= Lidia Chmielnicka-Żmuda =

Polish volleyball player (1939–2002)

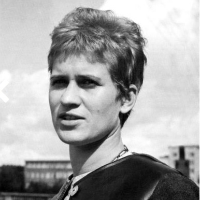

Personal information
- Full name: Lidia Teresa Chmielnicka-Żmuda
- Nationality: Polish
- Born: 8 March 1939; Lubliniec, Poland
- Died: 27 September 2002 (aged 63); Opole, Poland
- Height: 1.70 m (5 ft 7 in)
- Weight: 60 kg (130 lb)

National team
1963–1968	Poland
Honours
Women's volleyball
Representing Poland
Olympic Games
Bronze medal – third place	1968 Mexico
European Championship
Silver medal – second place	1963 Romania
Silver medal – second place	1967 Turkey
- Last updated: 26 June 2015

Lidia Teresa Chmielnicka-Żmuda (8 March 1939 – 27 September 2002) was a former female Polish volleyball player, a member of Poland women's national volleyball team in 1963–1968, bronze medalist of Olympic Games Mexico 1968 and silver medalist of European Championship (1963 and 1967), eight-time Polish Champion (1960, 1962, 1963, 1964, 1965, 1966, 1971, 1972).

== Career ==
In Polish national team she played 119 times in 1963-1968. She won a bronze medal of Olympic Games Mexico 1968 and double-silver of European Championship (Romania 1963 and Turkey 1967). Her club career began in Opole and then moved to AZS AWF Wawrszawa. She won with this club 6 titles of Polish Champion and silver medal of Polish Championship in season 1960/1961. Her next club was Start Łódź and she won with this team bronze, silver and two gold medals of Polish Championship.

== Sporting achievements ==
=== Clubs ===
==== National championships ====
- 1959/1960 Polish Championship, with AZS-AWF Warszawa
- 1960/1961 Polish Championship, with AZS-AWF Warszawa
- 1961/1962 Polish Championship, with AZS-AWF Warszawa
- 1962/1963 Polish Championship, with AZS-AWF Warszawa
- 1963/1964 Polish Championship, with AZS-AWF Warszawa
- 1964/1965 Polish Championship, with AZS-AWF Warszawa
- 1965/1966 Polish Championship, with AZS-AWF Warszawa
- 1968/1969 Polish Championship, with Start Łódź
- 1969/1970 Polish Championship, with Start Łódź
- 1970/1971 Polish Championship, with Start Łódź
- 1971/1972 Polish Championship, with Start Łódź

=== National team ===
- 1963 CEV European Championship
- 1967 CEV European Championship
- 1968 Olympic Games
