= Kunio Yonehara =

Japanese water polo player

Personal information
- Born: July 19, 1941 (age 83)

Sport
- Sport: Water polo

Kunio Yonehara (米原 邦夫, Yonehara Kunio, born 19 July 1941) is a Japanese former water polo player who competed in the 1968 Summer Olympics.
