= Tatyana Ponyayeva-Tretyakova =

Soviet volleyball player (born 1946)

Personal information
- Full name: Tatyana Petrovna Ponyayeva-Tretiyakova
- Born: December 13, 1946 (age 79); Moscow, Russian SFSR, Soviet Union
- Height: 1.76 m (5 ft 9 1/2 in)
Honours
Women's volleyball
Representing the Soviet Union
Olympic Games
Gold medal – first place	1968 Mexico City	Team
Gold medal – first place	1972 Munich	Team
World Championship
Gold medal – first place	1970 Bulgaria	Team
Silver medal – second place	1974 Mexico	Team
FIVB World Cup
Gold medal – first place	1973 Uruguay	Team

Tatyana Ponyayeva-Tretyakova (born December 13, 1946) is a Russian former volleyball player for the USSR. Born in Moscow, she competed for the Soviet Union at the 1968 and 1972 Summer Olympics.
