= Krystyna Czajkowska =

Polish volleyball player

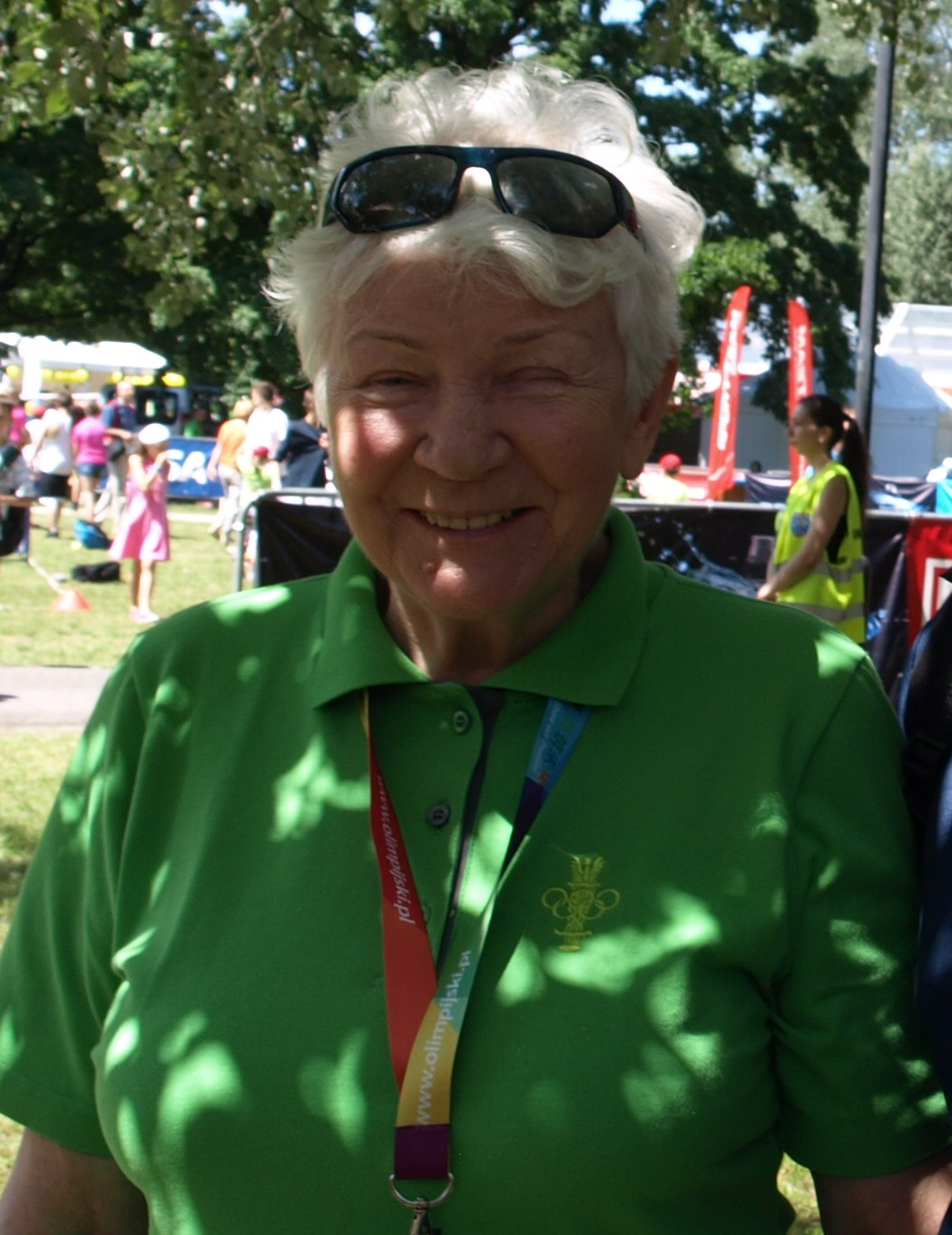

Personal information
- Full name: Krystyna Czajkowska-Rawska
- Nationality: Polish
- Born: 25 April 1936 (age 90); Sosnowiec, Poland

National team
1955–1968	Poland (228)
Honours
Representing Poland
Women's volleyball
Olympic Games
Bronze medal – third place	1964 Tokyo
Bronze medal – third place	1968 Mexico
World Championship
Bronze medal – third place	1962 Soviet Union
European Championship
Silver medal – second place	1963 Romania
Silver medal – second place	1967 Turkey
Bronze medal – third place	1958 Czechoslovakia
- Last updated: 26 June 2015

Krystyna Czajkowska-Rawska (born 25 April 1936) is a former Polish volleyball player, a member of Poland women's national volleyball team in 1955–1968, a bronze medalist of the Olympic Games (Tokyo 1964, Mexico 1968), a bronze medalist of the World Championship 1962 and medalist of the European Championship (silver in 1963 and 1967, bronze in 1958), eight-time Polish Champion, head coach.
