= Mamoru Shiragami =

Japanese volleyball player (born 1944)

Olympic medal record

Men's Volleyball
Silver medal – second place	1968 Mexico City	Team

Mamoru Shiragami (白神 守, Shiragami Mamoru; born February 28, 1944) is a Japanese former volleyball player who competed in the 1968 Summer Olympics.

He was born on the island of Taiwan.

In 1968 he was part of the Japanese team which won the silver medal in the Olympic tournament. He played all nine matches.
