= Isao Koizumi =

Japanese volleyball player (born 1945)

Olympic medal record

Men's Volleyball
Silver medal – second place	1968 Mexico City	Team

Isao Koizumi (小泉 勲, Koizumi Isao; born July 2, 1945) is a Japanese former volleyball player who competed in the 1968 Summer Olympics.

In 1968 he was part of the Japanese team which won the silver medal in the Olympic tournament. He played all nine matches.
