= Kenji Kimura =

Japanese volleyball player (born 1945)

Olympic medal record

Men's Volleyball
| Gold medal – first place | 1972 Munich | Team |
| Silver medal – second place | 1968 Mexico City | Team |

Kenji Kimura (木村 憲治, Kimura Kenji; born July 19, 1945) is a Japanese former volleyball player who competed in the 1968 Summer Olympics and in the 1972 Summer Olympics.

In 1968, he was part of the Japanese team which won the silver medal in the Olympic tournament. He played all nine matches.

Four years later, in 1972, he won the gold medal with the Japanese team in the 1972 Olympic tournament. He played all seven matches.
