= Katsutoshi Nekoda =

Japanese volleyball player (1944–1983)

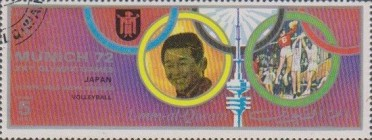

Personal information
- Born: 1 February 1944; Hiroshima, Japan
- Died: 4 September 1983 (aged 39)
- Height: 179 cm (5 ft 10 in)

Volleyball information
- Position: Setter
- Number: 2
Honours
Men's volleyball
Representing Japan
Olympic Games
Gold medal – first place	1972 Munich	Team
Silver medal – second place	1968 Mexico City	Team
Bronze medal – third place	1964 Tokyo	Team

Katsutoshi Nekoda (猫田 勝敏, Nekoda Katsutoshi; born 1 February 1944, in Hiroshima – died 4 September 1983) was a Japanese volleyball player and four-time Olympian. Nekoda was a member of the Japanese men's national volleyball team as a setter.

Nekoda led the Japan national volleyball team to a bronze medal in the 1964 Summer Olympics, a silver medal in the 1968 Summer Olympics, and a gold medal in the 1972 Summer Olympics. He was the flagbearer of Japan at the 1976 Summer Olympics.

Nekoda invented the ceiling serve, a serve where the ball is hit up towards the ceiling with all the lights to make it difficult to judge the landing. He retired in 1980, and died of stomach cancer in 1983.

In 2023, Nekoda was posthumously inducted into the International Volleyball Hall of Fame.

== See also ==
- JT Thunders
- Nekoda Memorial (Japan high school volleyball tournament in Chūgoku region among the 1st year students)
- Nekoda Memorial Gymnasium
