= Masayuki Minami =

Japanese volleyball player (1941–2000)

Personal information
- Born: 8 July 1941
- Died: 7 April 2000 (aged 58)
Medal record
Men's volleyball
Representing Japan
Olympic Games
Gold medal – first place	1972 Munich	Team competition
Silver medal – second place	1968 Mexico City	Team competition
Bronze medal – third place	1964 Tokyo	Team competition

Masayuki Minami (南 将之, Minami Masayuki; July 8, 1941 – April 7, 2000) was a Japanese volleyball player born in Fukuoka, Japan. He was a member of the Japanese Men's National Volleyball Team in the 1960s and early 1970s. He won three Olympic medals during his career.
