= Tadayoshi Yokota =

Japanese volleyball player (1947–2023)

Personal information
- Born: 26 September 1947 Mitoyo, Kagawa, Japan
- Died: 9 May 2023 (aged 75)
- Height: 1.94 m (6 ft 4 in)
Medal record
Men's volleyball
Representing Japan
Olympic Games
Gold medal – first place	1972 Munich	Team
Silver medal – second place	1968 Mexico City	Team

Tadayoshi Yokota (横田 忠義 Yokota Tadayoshi, 26 September 1947 – 9 May 2023) was a Japanese volleyball player, who was a member of the Japan Men's National Team that won the gold medal at the 1972 Summer Olympics in Munich and the silver medal at the 1968 Summer Olympics in Mexico City.

Yokota died on 9 May 2023, at the age of 75.

== National team ==
- 1968: 2nd place in the Olympic Games of Mexico City
- 1970: 3rd place in the World Championship
- 1972: 1st place in the Olympic Games of Munich
- 1974: 3rd place in the World Championship
- 1976: 4th place in the Olympic Games of Montreal
