= Yōko Kasahara =

Japanese volleyball player (born 1945)

Olympic medal record

Women's Volleyball
Silver medal – second place	1968 Mexico City	Team

Yōko Kasahara (笠原 洋子, Kasahara Yōko; born 4 August 1945) is a female Japanese former volleyball player who competed in the 1968 Summer Olympics.

In 1968 she was a squad member of the Japanese team which won the silver medal in the Olympic tournament.
