= Keiko Hama =

Japanese volleyball player (born 1947)

Personal information
- Born: November 7, 1947 (age 78); Chiba Prefecture, Japan
- Height: 1.72 m (5 ft 7 1/2 in)
Medal record
Women's volleyball
Representing Japan
Olympic Games
Silver medal – second place	1968 Mexico City	Team
Silver medal – second place	1972 Munich	Team
Asian Games
Gold medal – first place	1966 Bangkok	Team
Gold medal – first place	1970 Bangkok	Team

Keiko Hama (浜 恵子, Hama Keiko; born November 7, 1947) is a Japanese former volleyball player who competed in the 1968 Summer Olympics and in the 1972 Summer Olympics.

She was born in Chiba Prefecture.

In 1968 she was part of the Japanese team which won the silver medal in the Olympic tournament. She played five matches.

Four years later she won her second Olympic silver medal with the Japanese team. She played one match.
