= Naohiro Ikeda =

Japanese volleyball player (1940–2021)

Olympic medal record

Men's Volleyball
| Silver medal – second place | 1968 Mexico City | Team |
| Bronze medal – third place | 1964 Tokyo | Team |

Naohiro Ikeda (池田 尚弘, Ikeda Naohiro; later Nakano 中野, 17 January 1940 – 3 January 2021) was a Japanese volleyball player who competed in the 1964 Summer Olympics and in the 1968 Summer Olympics.

He was born in Saga Prefecture.

In 1964 he was part of the Japanese team which won the bronze medal in the Olympic tournament. He played all nine matches.

Four years later he was a squad member of the Japanese team which won the silver medal in the 1968 Olympic tournament.

He died from lymphoma.
