= Aiko Onozawa =

Japanese volleyball player (born 1945)

Personal information
- Other names: Aiko Schweikert
- Born: August 19, 1945 (age 81) Midori-ku, Sagamihara, Kanagawa, Japan
Medal record
Women's Volleyball
Olympic Games
Silver medal – second place	1968 Mexico City	Team

Aiko Onozawa Schweikert (小野沢 愛子, Onozawa Aiko; born 1945) is a Japanese former volleyball player who competed in the 1968 Summer Olympics.

Onozawa was born in Sagamihara, Kanagawa Prefecture. In 1968 Onozawa was a member of the Japanese Yashica Women's Volleyball team when they won the silver medal in the Olympic tournament. She also won a gold medal at the 1969 Asian Games in Thailand, and a silver medal at the 1971 World Cup in Bulgaria.

In the 1970s she coached volleyball and competed in bowling. In 1978, while living in Tempe, Arizona, with her American husband George Schweikert and their son, she was recruited to play for the El Paso/Suarez Sol, a professional volleyball team.

In 2024 Schweikert was the special guest for a Japanese Heritage Day event at the Arizona Athletic Grounds in Mesa.
