= Makiko Furukawa =

Japanese volleyball player (born 1947)

Olympic medal record

Women's Volleyball
Silver medal – second place	1968 Mexico City	Team
Silver medal – second place	1972 Munich	Team

Makiko Furukawa (古川 牧子, Furukawa Makiko; born January 22, 1947) is a Japanese former volleyball player who competed in the 1968 Summer Olympics and in the 1972 Summer Olympics.

She was born in Inzai, Chiba.

In 1968 she was a squad member of the Japanese team which won the silver medal in the Olympic tournament.

Four years later she won her second Olympic silver medal with the Japanese team. She played all five matches.
