= Sumie Oinuma =

Japanese volleyball player (born 1946)

Olympic medal record

Women's Volleyball
| Silver medal – second place | 1968 Mexico City | Team |
| Silver medal – second place | 1972 Munich | Team |

Sumie Oinuma (生沼 スミエ, Oinuma Sumie; born October 8, 1946) is a female Japanese former volleyball player who competed in the 1968 Summer Olympics and in the 1972 Summer Olympics.

== Early life ==
She was born in Tokyo.

== International career ==
In 1968 Oinuma was part of the Japanese team which won the silver medal in the Olympic tournament. She played all seven matches.

Four years later she won her second Olympic silver medal with the Japanese team. She played all five matches.
