= Yukiyo Kojima =

Japanese volleyball player (born 1945)

Olympic medal record

Women's Volleyball
Silver medal – second place	1968 Mexico City	Team

Yukiyo Kojima (小嶋 由紀代, Kojima Yukiyo; born December 10, 1945) is a Japanese former volleyball player who competed in the 1968 Summer Olympics.

In 1968 she was part of the Japanese team which won the silver medal in the Olympic tournament. She played all seven matches.
