= Toyoko Iwahara =

Japanese volleyball player (born 1945)

Olympic medal record

Women's Volleyball
Silver medal – second place	1968 Mexico City	Team
Silver medal – second place	1972 Munich	Team

Toyoko Iwahara (岩原 豊子, Iwahara Toyoko; born May 11, 1945 in Taito-ku, Tokyo) is a female Japanese former volleyball player who competed in the 1968 Summer Olympics and in the 1972 Summer Olympics.

In 1968 she was part of the Japanese team which won the silver medal in the Olympic tournament. She played all seven matches.

Four years later she won her second Olympic silver medal with the Japanese team. She played one match.
