= Setsuko Inoue =

Japanese volleyball player (born 1946)

Olympic medal record

Women's Volleyball
| Silver medal – second place | 1968 Mexico City | Team |

Setsuko Inoue (井上 節子, Inoue Setsuko) (born September 16, 1946) is a Japanese former volleyball player who competed in the 1968 Summer Olympics.

She was born in Kanagawa Prefecture.

In 1968 she was part of the Japanese team which won the silver medal in the Olympic tournament. She played all seven matches.
