= Suzue Takayama =

Japanese volleyball player

Personal information
- Nationality: Japanese
- Born: December 12, 1946 (age 79); Osaka Prefecture, Japan

National team
Japan women's national volleyball team
Honours
Women's volleyball
Representing Japan
Olympic Games
Silver medal – second place	1968 Mexico City	Team

Suzue Takayama (高山 鈴江, Takayama Suzue; born December 12, 1946) is a female Japanese former volleyball player who competed in the 1968 Summer Olympics.

== Early life ==
Takayama was born in Osaka Prefecture.

== Domestic career ==
Takayama played for the Hitachi Musashi team in the domestic Volleyball League. She was part of the squad which won the national title in 1967 and 1968, the first two years the League was played.

== Volleyball career ==
Takayama was a member of the Japanese squad which won gold at the 1967 FIVB Volleyball Women’s World Championships.

The next year, in 1968, she was part of the Japanese team which won the silver medal in the Olympic tournament. She played all seven matches.

== Awards ==
As a member of the Japanese squad which won the 1967 World Championships, Takayama was a recipient of the Asahi Sports Award for 1967.
