= Kunie Shishikura =

Japanese volleyball player (born 1946)

Olympic medal record

Women's Volleyball
Silver medal – second place	1968 Mexico City	Team

Kunie Shishikura (宍倉 邦枝, Shishikura Kunie; born July 13, 1946) is a Japanese former volleyball player who competed in the 1968 Summer Olympics.

She was born in Chiba Prefecture.

In 1968 she was part of the Japanese team which won the silver medal in the Olympic tournament. She played all seven matches.
