= Setsuko Yoshida =

Japanese volleyball player (born 1942)

Olympic medal record

Women's Volleyball
Silver medal – second place	1968 Mexico City	Team

Setsuko Yoshida (吉田 節子, Yoshida Setsuko) (born November 4, 1942) is a Japanese former volleyball player who competed in the 1968 Summer Olympics.

She was born in Aichi Prefecture.

In 1968 she was part of the Japanese team which won the silver medal in the Olympic tournament. She played six matches.
