= List of Olympic medalists in volleyball =

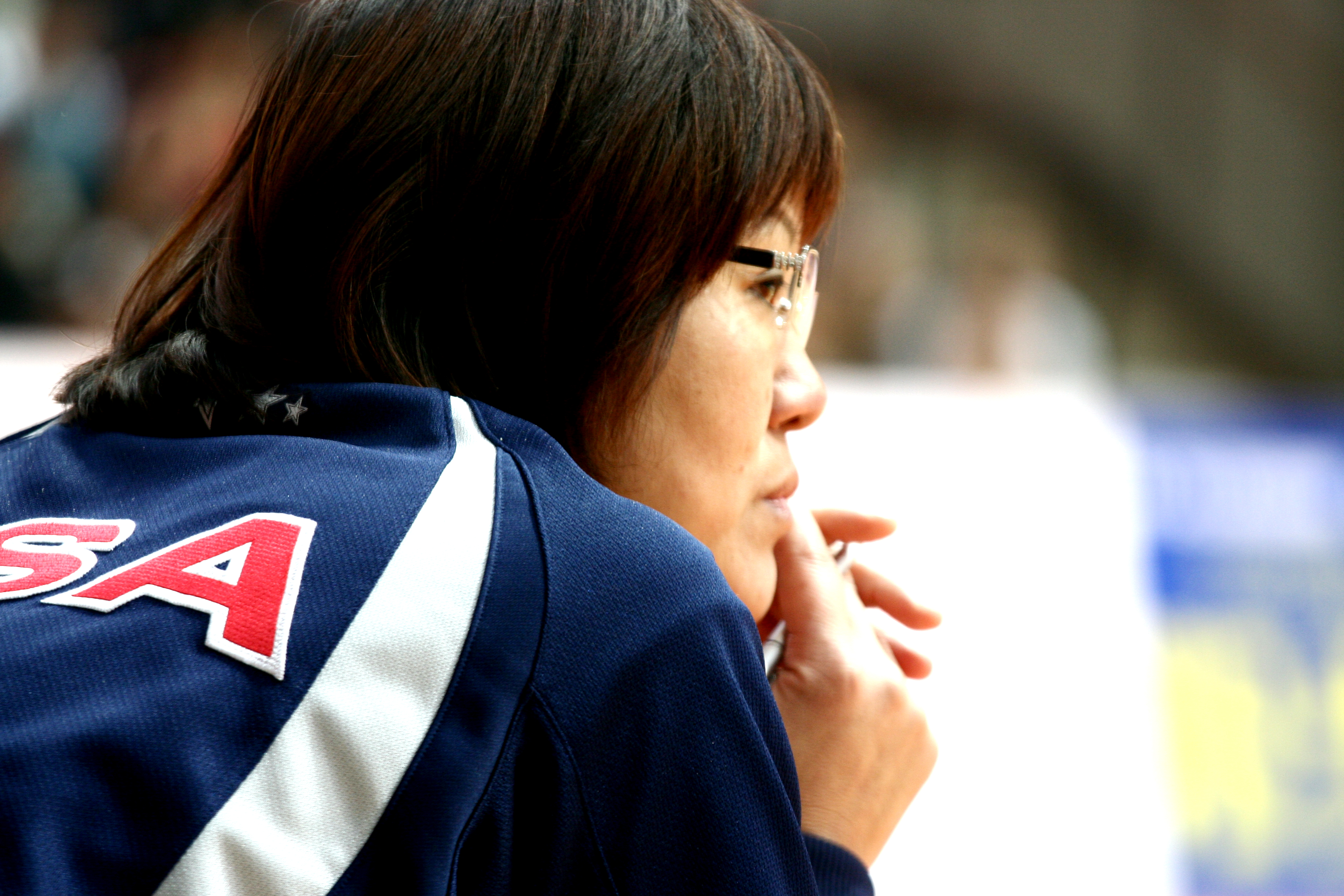
Chinese Lang Ping was the first player to win gold medals as player and coach, as part of the Los Angeles 1984 People's Republic of China squad and leading the Rio 2016 team (she also led the United States' women to the silver in 2008).

Volleyball is one of the sports that is played at the Summer Olympic Games in two disciplines: the traditional six-per-side indoor game, and the newer game of beach volleyball. Indoor volleyball was added to the Olympic programme in 1957 at the 53rd session of the International Olympic Committee (IOC) in Sofia, Bulgaria, and the first competitions were held at the 1964 Summer Olympics in Tokyo.

Six athletes have each won four medals in volleyball. Cuban Ana Fernández and American Kerri Walsh Jennings each have three gold and one bronze, (Note: Although Sports-Reference does not list Ana Fernández among the medalists in 1992, her name is contained in the International Olympic Committee's database and the Official Report of the Barcelona Olympics as having won a gold medal with the Cuban team in 1992. For her medals in 1996, 2000, and 2004 no such disagreement exists.) Soviet Inna Ryskal and Brazilian Sérgio Santos have two gold and two silver medals, Russian Sergey Tetyukhin has one gold, one silver, and two bronzes, and Italian Samuele Papi has two silvers and two bronzes. Ten athletes have won three gold medals. Seven, including Fernández, were members of the Cuban women's indoor team that won consecutive golds in 1992, 1996 and 2000. May-Treanor and Walsh Jennings, as noted above, won beach volleyball gold medals in 2004, 2008 and 2012. The other is Karch Kiraly, who won gold with the United States men's indoor team in 1984 and 1988 and in beach volleyball in 1996. Kiraly is the only player of either gender to win medals in both indoor and beach volleyball. Kiraly is also one of four people that have won medals both as a player and coach. Apart from May-Treanor and Walsh Jennings of the United States, Ricardo Santos and Emanuel Rego of Brazil are the only athletes with three medals in beach volleyball. They have one gold and one bronze as a team, and each has one silver with other partners.

== History ==
The Soviet Union won a medal in both the men's and women's competition at the first five Olympics that included volleyball, including the men's gold medal in Tokyo. The Japanese women's team won the gold at the inaugural Olympic volleyball competition, and the silver at the following two Games. The Montreal Games of 1976 saw the Polish men win the nation's only gold medal in the sport, after the women had won bronze in 1964 and 1968. At the 1980 Moscow Olympics, the hosts won gold in both competitions. The Bulgarian team won their only two volleyball medals in Moscow, a silver and a bronze in the men's and women's tournament, respectively. The United States won its first medals in volleyball at the Los Angeles Games: a gold in the men's competition, and a silver in the women's. The People's Republic of China won the gold medal in the women's competition in Los Angeles, their first time participating in an Olympic volleyball competition. The United States successfully defended their men's gold medal at the 1988 Summer Olympics in Seoul, and Peru won their only medal in volleyball, a silver in the women's competition. The Soviet Union won a silver medal in the men's competition and a gold in the women's at what would be their final Olympics. Following the 1990–91 breakup of the Soviet Union, 12 of the 15 newly independent countries competed together as the Unified Team in Barcelona. In the women's competition, the Unified Team won the silver medal, and Cuba won their first of three consecutive gold medals. In the men's competition, Brazil won its first gold medal, and the Netherlands its first overall medal in the sport.

On 18 September 1993, at the 101st IOC session in Monte Carlo, the Committee voted to add beach volleyball for both men and women to the Olympic programme effective with the 1996 Atlanta Games. A National Olympic Committee is permitted to enter two teams in the beach volleyball tournament; a rule that allowed the United States and Brazil to win both gold and silver in men's and women's beach volleyball respectively that year. Atlanta also saw the Dutch men's indoor team improve their Barcelona silver to a gold. At the 2000 Sydney Olympics, the host Australian team won the gold medal in the women's beach volleyball competition, and the Russian Federation took home its first volleyball medals as an independent country with silver in both indoor competitions. At the 2004 Athens Olympics, Spain won its only medal in volleyball, a silver in the men's beach volleyball competition. In women's beach volleyball, the United States team of Misty May (now May-Treanor) and Kerri Walsh (now Walsh Jennings) won the first of three consecutive gold medals, the only team to defend a beach volleyball gold medal. At the 2008 Beijing Olympics, the United States men's indoor team won all their matches on the way to their third gold medal win. This equalled the former Soviet Union's record for the most men's championships. The Soviets won twelve medals in the indoor competition, and Brazilian teams have won thirteen medals in beach competition; respectively the most in each discipline. The Brazilian teams, however, with ten indoor medals lead all nations with a total of twenty medals in volleyball events at the Olympics.

== Volleyball (indoor) ==
=== Men ===
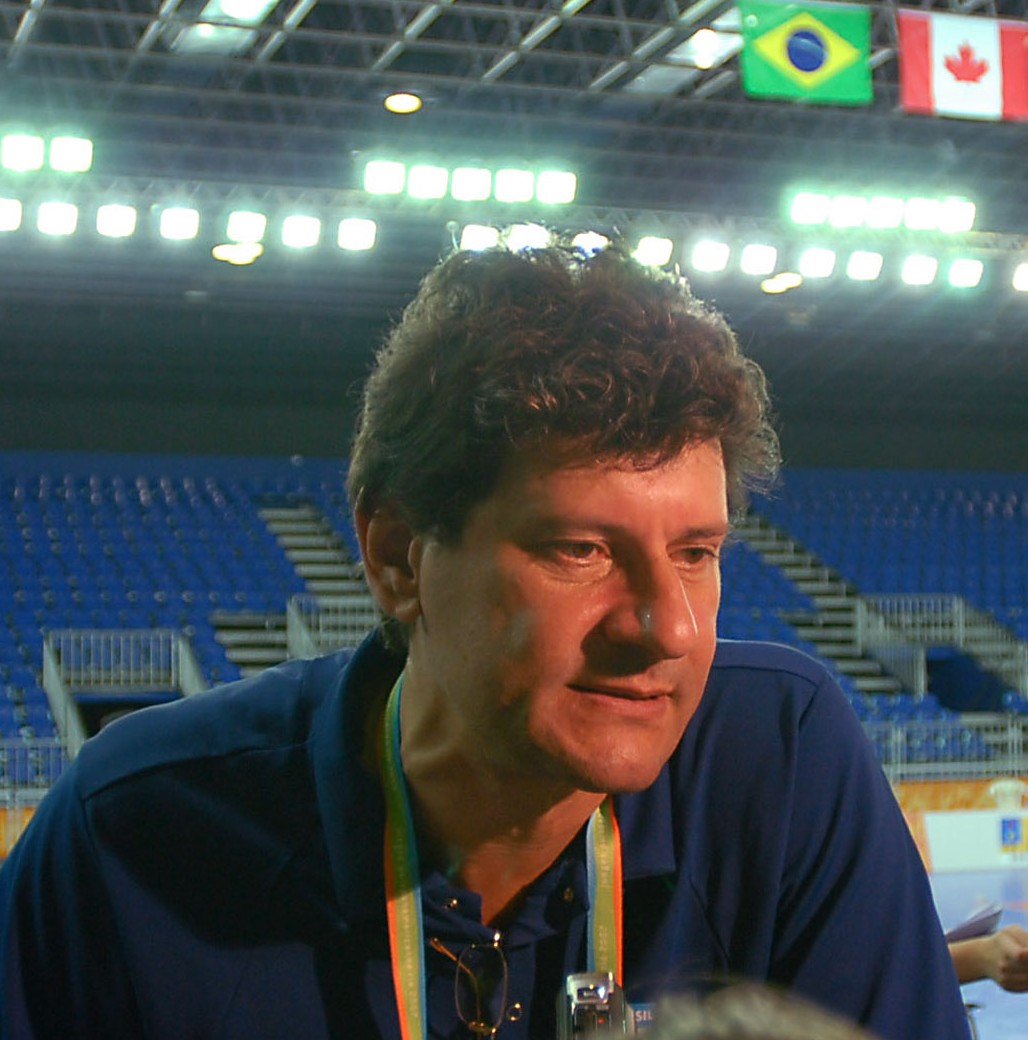
Brazilian Amauri Ribeiro won silver in 1984 and gold in 1992.

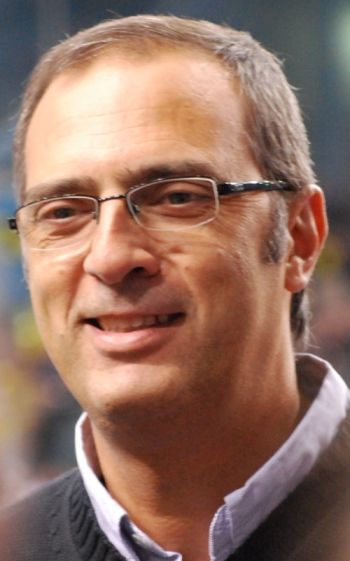
A bronze medalist in 1988, Argentine Daniel Castellani later coached the Polish men's national team.

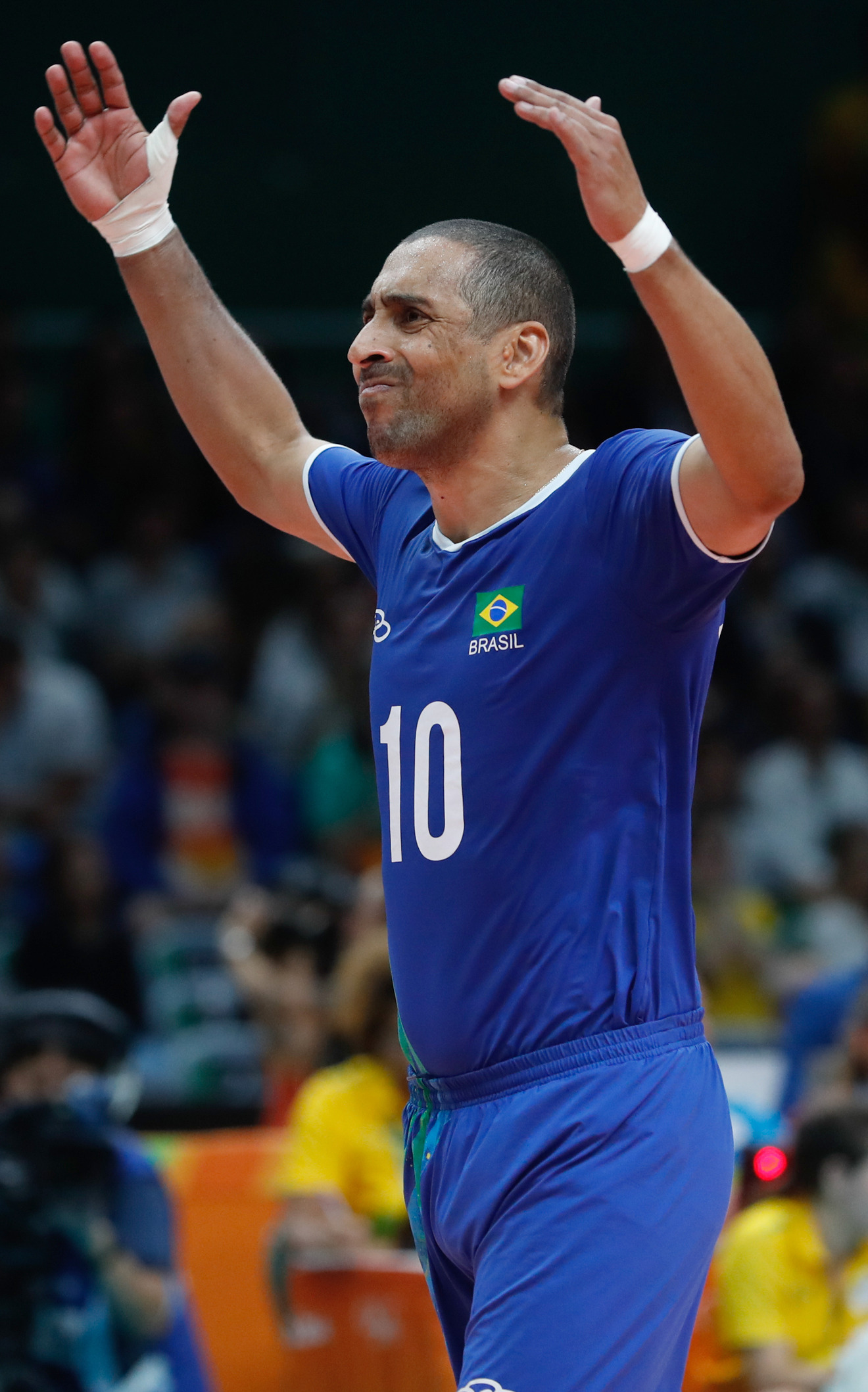
Brazilian Sérgio Santos is the only player to reach four straight finals, winning two.

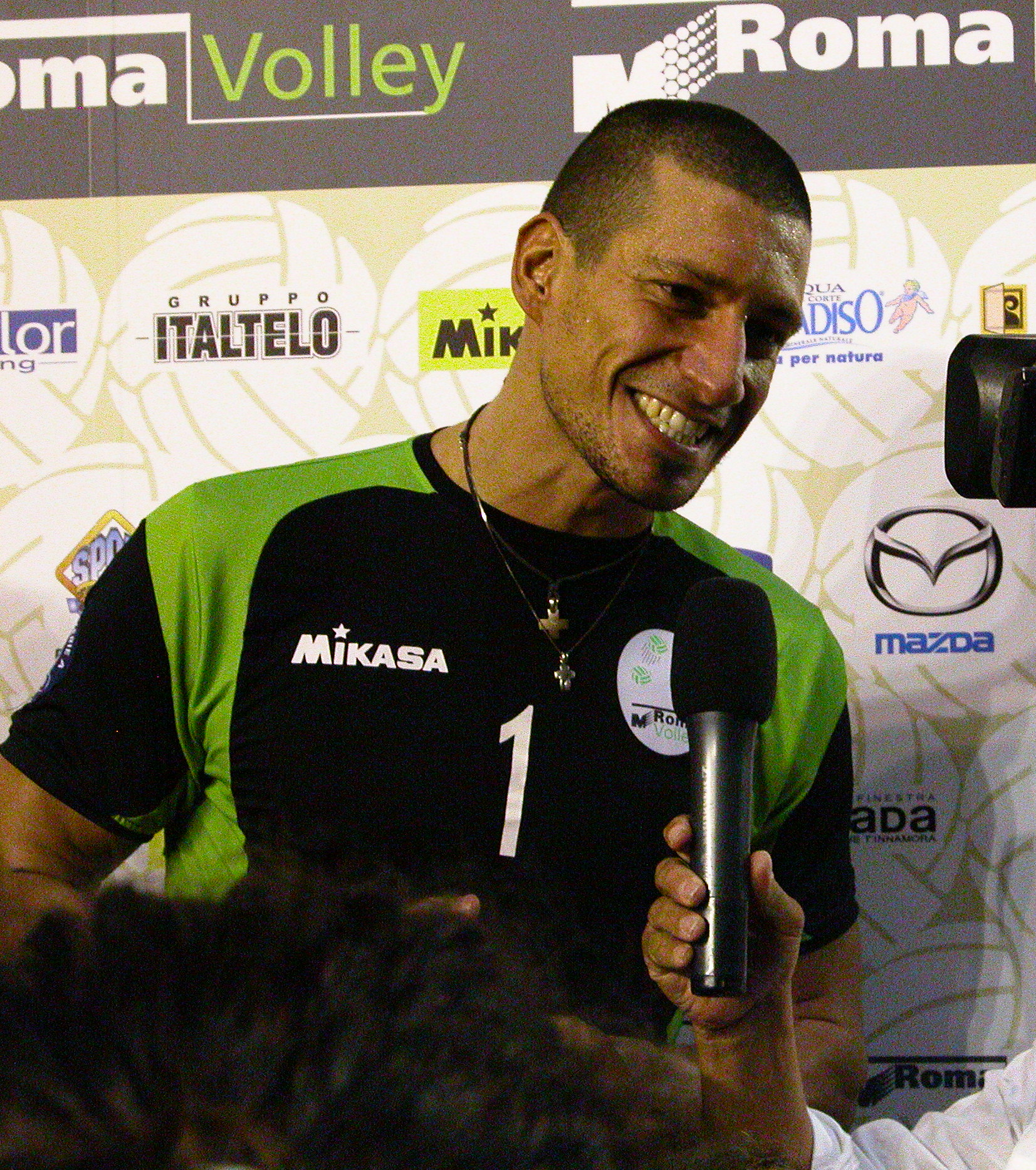
Luigi Mastrangelo has won three medals with the Italian team.

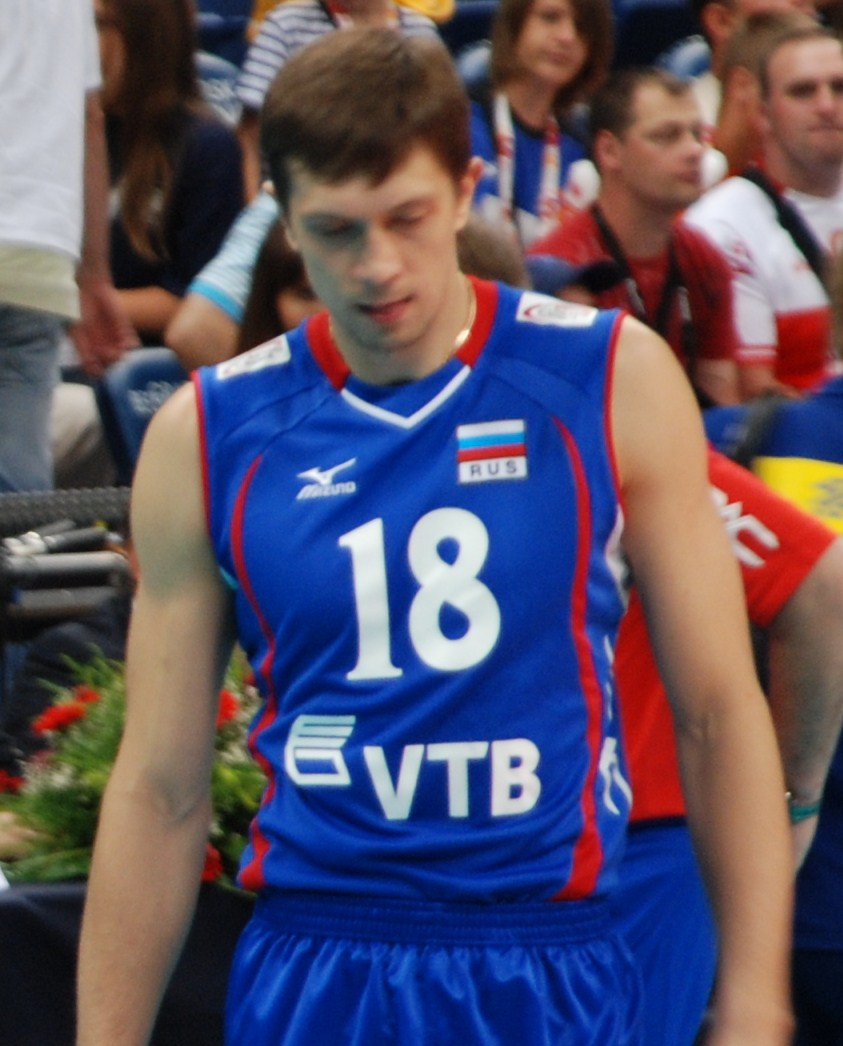
Aleksey Kuleshov is a three-time medalist for Russia.

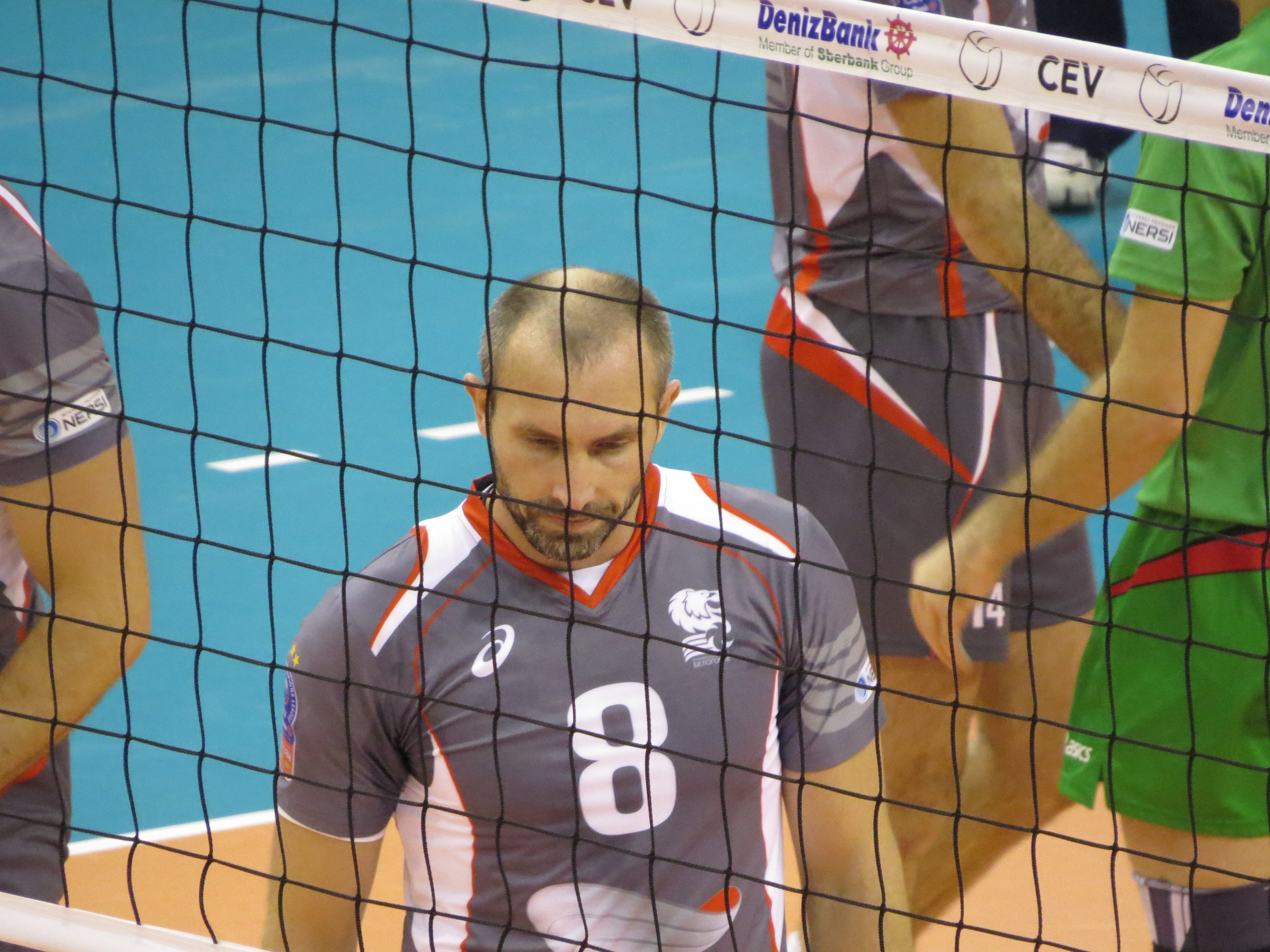
Russian Sergey Tetyukhin finished in the final four in five straight tournaments, missing a medal only in 2016.

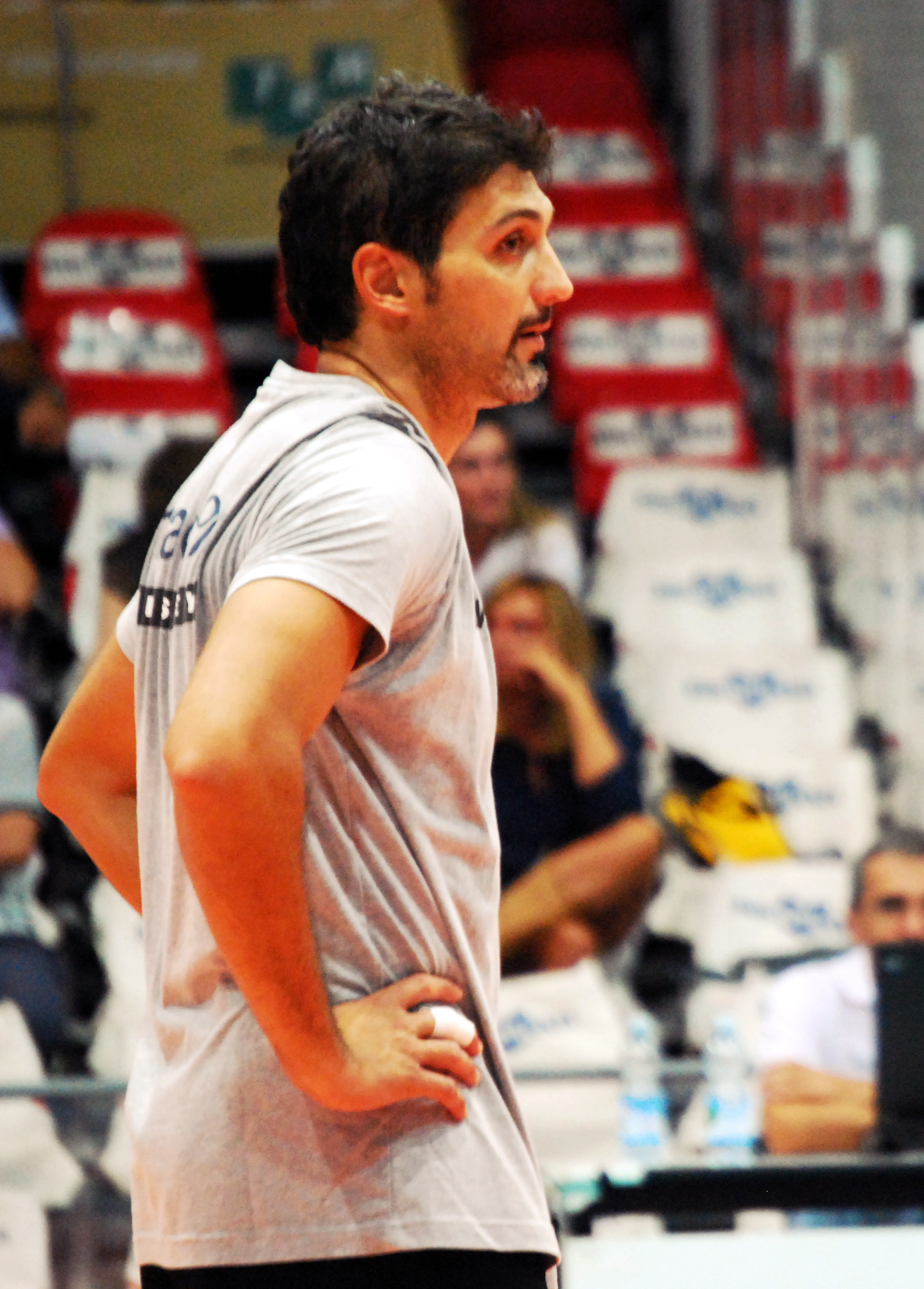
Italian Samuele Papi is one of three men, along with Santos and Tetyukhin, to win four volleyball medals.

Games	Gold	Silver	Bronze
1964 Tokyo	Soviet Union; Ivans Bugajenkovs; Nikolay Burobin; Yuri Chesnokov; Vazha Kacharava; Valeri Kalachikhin; Vitali Kovalenko; Staņislavs Lugailo; Georgy Mondzolevski; Yuriy Poyarkov; Eduard Sibiryakov; Yury Vengerovsky; Dmitri Voskoboynikov	Czechoslovakia; Milan Čuda; Bohumil Golián; Zdeněk Humhal; Petr Kop; Josef Labuda; Josef Musil; Karel Paulus; Boris Perušič; Pavel Schenk; Václav Šmídl; Josef Šorm; Ladislav Toman	Japan; Yutaka Demachi; Tsutomu Koyama; Sadatoshi Sugahara; Naohiro Ikeda; Yasutaka Sato; Toshiaki Kosedo; Tokihiko Higuchi; Masayuki Minami; Takeshi Tokutomi; Teruhisa Moriyama; Yūzo Nakamura; Katsutoshi Nekoda
1968 Mexico City	Soviet Union; Eduard Sibiryakov; Valeri Kravchenko; Volodymyr Byelyayev; Yevhen Lapinsky; Oļegs Antropovs; Vasilijus Matuševas; Viktor Mikhalchuk; Yuriy Poyarkov; Borys Tereshchuk; Volodymyr Ivanov; Ivans Bugajenkovs; Georgy Mondzolevski	Japan; Masayuki Minami; Katsutoshi Nekoda; Mamoru Shiragami; Isao Koizumi; Kenji Kimura; Yasuaki Mitsumori; Jungo Morita; Tadayoshi Yokota; Seiji Oko; Tetsuo Satō; Kenji Shimaoka; Naohiro Ikeda	Czechoslovakia; Antonín Procházka; Jiří Svoboda; Lubomír Zajíček; Josef Musil; Josef Smolka; Vladimír Petlák; Petr Kop; František Sokol; Bohumil Golián; Zdeněk Groessl; Pavel Schenk; Drahomír Koudelka
1972 Munich	Japan; Yoshihide Fukao; Kenji Kimura; Masayuki Minami; Jungo Morita; Yūzo Nakamura; Katsutoshi Nekoda; Tetsuo Nishimoto; Yasuhiro Noguchi; Seiji Oko; Tetsuo Satō; Kenji Shimaoka; Tadayoshi Yokota	East Germany; Horst Hagen; Wolfgang Löwe; Wolfgang Maibohm; Jürgen Maune; Horst Peter; Eckehard Pietzsch; Siegfried Schneider; Arnold Schulz; Rudi Schumann; Rainer Tscharke; Wolfgang Webner; Wolfgang Weise	Soviet Union; Viktor Borshch; Yefim Chulak; Vyacheslav Domani; Vladimir Kondra; Valeri Kravchenko; Yevhen Lapinsky; Vladimir Patkin; Yuriy Poyarkov; Vladimir Putyatov; Aleksandr Saprykin; Yuri Starunsky; Leonid Zayko
1976 Montreal	Poland; Bronisław Bebel; Ryszard Bosek; Wiesław Gawłowski; Marek Karbarz; Lech Łasko; Zbigniew Lubiejewski; Mirosław Rybaczewski; Włodzimierz Sadalski; Edward Skorek; Włodzimierz Stefański; Tomasz Wójtowicz; Zbigniew Zarzycki	Soviet Union; Vladimir Chernyshyov; Yefim Chulak; Vladimir Dorokhov; Aleksandr Ermilov; Vladimir Kondra; Oleg Moliboga; Anatoliy Polishchuk; Aleksandr Savin; Pāvels Seļivanovs; Yuri Starunsky; Vladimir Ulanov; Vyacheslav Zaytsev	Cuba; Alfredo Figueredo; Víctor García; Diego Lapera; Leonel Marshall Steward, Sr. Ernesto Martínez; Lorenzo Martínez; Jorge Pérez; Antonio Rodríguez; Carlos Salas; Victoriano Sarmientos; Jesús Savigne; Raúl Vilches
1980 Moscow	Soviet Union; Vladimir Chernyshyov; Vladimir Dorokhov; Aleksandr Ermilov; Vladimir Kondra; Valeriy Kryvov; Fedir Lashchonov; Viljar Loor; Oleg Moliboga; Yury Panchenko; Aleksandr Savin; Pāvels Seļivanovs; Vyacheslav Zaytsev	Bulgaria; Yordan Angelov; Dimitar Dimitrov; Stefan Dimitrov; Stoyan Gunchev; Hristo Iliev; Petko Petkov; Kaspar Simeonov; Hristo Stoyanov; Mitko Todorov; Tsano Tsanov; Emil Valtchev; Dimitar Zlatanov	Romania; Marius Căta-Chiţiga; Valter Chifu; Laurenţiu Dumănoiu; Günther Enescu; Dan Gîrleanu; Sorin Macavei; Viorel Manole; Florin Mina; Corneliu Oros; Nicolae Pop; Constantin Sterea; Nicu Stoian
1984 Los Angeles	United States; Douglas Dvorak; Dave Saunders; Steven Salmons; Paul Sunderland; Rich Duwelius; Steve Timmons; Craig Buck; Marc Waldie; Chris Marlowe (c); Aldis Berzins; Patrick Powers; Karch Kiraly	Brazil; Amauri Ribeiro; Antônio Carlos Gueiros Ribeiro; Bernard Rajzman; Bernardo Rocha de Rezende; Domingos Lampariello Neto; Fernando Roscio de Ávila; Marcus Vinícius Simões Freire; Montanaro; Renan Dal Zotto; Rui Campos do Nascimento; William Carvalho da Silva; Xandó	Italy; Franco Bertoli; Francesco Dall'Olio; Giancarlo Dametto; Guido De Luigi; Giovanni Errichiello; Giovanni Lanfranco; Andrea Lucchetta; Pier Paolo Lucchetta; Marco Negri; Piero Rebaudengo; Paolo Vecchi; Fabio Vullo
1988 Seoul	United States; Craig Buck; Bob Ctvrtlik; Scott Fortune; Karch Kiraly (c); Ricci Luyties; Douglas Partie; Jon Root; Eric Sato; Dave Saunders; Jeff Stork; Troy Tanner; Steve Timmons	Soviet Union; Yaroslav Antonov; Yuri Cherednik; Evgeni Krasilnikov; Andrei Kuznetsov; Valeri Losev; Yury Panchenko; Igor Runov; Yuri Sapega; Vladimir Shkurikhin; Oleksandr Sorokalet; Raimonds Vilde; Vyacheslav Zaytsev	Argentina; Daniel Castellani; Daniel Colla; Hugo Conte; Juan Cuminetti; Esteban de Palma; Alejandro Diz; Waldo Kantor; Esteban Martínez; Raúl Quiroga; Jon Uriarte; Carlos Weber; Claudio Zulianello
1992 Barcelona	Brazil; Amauri Ribeiro; Antônio Gouveia; Douglas Chiarotti; Giovane Gávio; Janelson Carvalho; Jorge Edson Brito; Maurício Lima; Marcelo Negrão; Paulo André Silva; André Felipe Ferreira; Talmo; Tande	Netherlands; Edwin Benne; Peter Blangé; Ron Boudrie; Henk-Jan Held; Martin van der Horst; Marko Klok; Olof van der Meulen; Jan Posthuma; Avital Selinger; Martin Teffer; Ronald Zoodsma; Ron Zwerver	United States; Nick Becker; Carlos Briceno; Bob Ctvrtlik; Scott Fortune; Dan Greenbaum; Brent Hilliard; Bryan Ivie; Douglas Partie; Bob Samuelson; Eric Sato; Jeff Stork; Steve Timmons
1996 Atlanta	Netherlands; Peter Blangé; Guido Görtzen; Rob Grabert; Henk-Jan Held; Misha Latuhihin; Jan Posthuma; Brecht Rodenburg; Richard Schuil; Bas van de Goor; Mike van de Goor; Olof van der Meulen; Ron Zwerver	Italy; Lorenzo Bernardi; Vigor Bovolenta; Marco Bracci; Luca Cantagalli; Andrea Gardini; Andrea Giani; Pasquale Gravina; Marco Meoni; Samuele Papi; Andrea Sartoretti; Paolo Tofoli; Andrea Zorzi	FR Yugoslavia; Vladimir Batez; Dejan Brđović; Đorđe Đurić; Andrija Gerić; Nikola Grbić; Vladimir Grbić; Rajko Jokanović; Slobodan Kovač; Đula Mešter; Žarko Petrović; Željko Tanasković; Goran Vujević
2000 Sydney	FR Yugoslavia; Vladimir Batez; Slobodan Kovač; Slobodan Boškan; Đula Mešter; Vasa Mijić; Nikola Grbić; Vladimir Grbić; Andrija Gerić; Goran Vujević; Ivan Miljković; Veljko Petković; Igor Vušurović	Russia; Vadim Khamuttskikh; Ruslan Olikhver; Valeri Goryushev; Igor Shulepov; Aleksey Kazakov; Evgeni Mitkov; Sergey Tetyukhin; Roman Yakovlev; Konstantin Ushakov; Aleksandr Gerasimov; Ilya Savelev; Aleksey Kuleshov	Italy; Andrea Gardini; Marco Meoni; Pasquale Gravina; Luigi Mastrangelo; Paolo Tofoli; Samuele Papi; Andrea Sartoretti; Marco Bracci; Simone Rosalba; Mirko Corsano; Andrea Giani; Alessandro Fei
2004 Athens	Brazil; Giovane Gávio; André Heller; Maurício Lima; Gilberto Godoy Filho; André Nascimento; Sérgio Santos; Anderson Rodrigues; Nalbert Bitencourt; Gustavo Endres; Rodrigo Santana; Ricardo Garcia; Dante Amaral	Italy; Luigi Mastrangelo; Valerio Vermiglio; Samuele Papi; Andrea Sartoretti; Alberto Cisolla; Ventzislav Simeonov; Damiano Pippi; Andrea Giani; Alessandro Fei; Paolo Tofoli; Paolo Cozzi; Matej Černič	Russia; Stanislav Dineykin; Sergei Baranov; Pavel Abramov; Aleksey Kazakov; Sergey Tetyukhin; Vadim Khamuttskikh; Aleksandr Kosarev; Konstantin Ushakov; Taras Khtey; Andrey Egorchev; Aleksey Verbov; Aleksey Kuleshov
2008 Beijing	United States; Lloy Ball; Sean Rooney; David Lee; Richard Lambourne; Reid Priddy; Ryan Millar; Riley Salmon; Thomas Hoff (c); Clayton Stanley; Kevin Hansen; Gabriel Gardner; Scott Touzinsky	Brazil; Bruno Rezende; Marcelo Elgarten; André Heller; Samuel Fuchs; Gilberto Godoy Filho (c); Murilo Endres; André Nascimento; Sérgio Santos; Anderson Rodrigues; Gustavo Endres; Rodrigo Santana; Dante Amaral	Russia; Aleksandr Korneev; Semyon Poltavskiy; Aleksandr Kosarev; Sergey Grankin; Sergey Tetyukhin; Vadim Khamuttskikh; Yury Berezhko; Aleksey Ostapenko; Aleksandr Volkov; Aleksey Verbov; Maxim Mikhaylov; Aleksey Kuleshov
2012 London	Russia; Nikolay Apalikov; Taras Khtey; Sergey Grankin; Sergey Tetyukhin; Aleksandr Sokolov; Yury Berezhko; Aleksandr Butko; Dmitry Muserskiy; Dmitry Ilinikh; Maxim Mikhaylov; Aleksandr Volkov; Aleksey Obmochaev	Brazil; Bruno Rezende; Wallace de Souza; Sidnei dos Santos Júnior; Leandro Vissotto; Gilberto Godoy Filho; Murilo Endres; Sérgio Santos; Thiago Soares Alves; Rodrigo Santana; Lucas Saatkamp; Ricardo Garcia; Dante Amaral	Italy; Cristian Savani; Luigi Mastrangelo; Simone Parodi; Samuele Papi; Michal Lasko; Ivan Zaytsev; Dante Boninfante; Dragan Travica; Alessandro Fei; Emanuele Birarelli; Andrea Bari; Andrea Giovi
2016 Rio de Janeiro	Brazil; William Arjona; Éder Carbonera; Wallace de Souza; Luiz Felipe Fonteles; Evandro Guerra; Ricardo Lucarelli; Bruno Rezende (c); Lucas Saatkamp; Sérgio Santos; Maurício Borges Silva; Douglas Souza; Maurício Souza	Italy; Oleg Antonov; Emanuele Birarelli; Simone Buti; Massimo Colaci; Simone Giannelli; Osmany Juantorena; Filippo Lanza; Matteo Piano; Salvatore Rossini; Daniele Sottile; Luca Vettori; Ivan Zaytsev	United States; Matthew Anderson; Micah Christenson; Maxwell Holt; Thomas Jaeschke; David Lee; Reid Priddy; Aaron Russell; Taylor Sander; Erik Shoji; Kawika Shoji; David Smith; Murphy Troy
2020 Tokyo	France; Barthélémy Chinenyeze; Jenia Grebennikov; Jean Patry; Benjamin Toniutti (c); Kevin Tillie; Earvin N'Gapeth; Antoine Brizard; Stéphen Boyer; Nicolas Le Goff; Daryl Bultor; Trévor Clévenot; Yacine Louati	ROC (ROC); Yaroslav Podlesnykh; Artem Volvich; Dmitry Volkov; Ivan Iakovlev; Denis Bogdan; Pavel Pankov; Viktor Poletaev; Maxim Mikhaylov; Egor Kliuka; Ilyas Kurkaev; Igor Kobzar (c); Valentin Golubev	Argentina; Matías Sánchez; Federico Pereyra; Cristian Poglajen; Facundo Conte; Agustín Loser; Santiago Danani; Sebastián Solé; Bruno Lima; Ezequiel Palacios; Luciano De Cecco (c); Nicolás Méndez; Martín Ramos
2024 Paris	France; Barthélémy Chinenyeze; Jenia Grebennikov; Jean Patry; Benjamin Toniutti; Kévin Tillie; Earvin N'Gapeth; Antoine Brizard; Nicolas Le Goff; Trévor Clévenot; Yacine Louati; Théo Faure; Quentin Jouffroy	Poland; Łukasz Kaczmarek; Bartosz Kurek; Wilfredo León; Aleksander Śliwka; Grzegorz Łomacz; Jakub Kochanowski; Kamil Semeniuk; Paweł Zatorski; Marcin Janusz; Mateusz Bieniek; Tomasz Fornal; Norbert Huber; Bartłomiej Bołądź	United States; Matt Anderson; Aaron Russell; Jeffrey Jendryk; Torey DeFalco; Micah Christenson; Maxwell Holt; Micah Maʻa; Thomas Jaeschke; Garrett Muagututia; Taylor Averill; David Smith; Erik Shoji
2028 Los Angeles			

=== Women ===
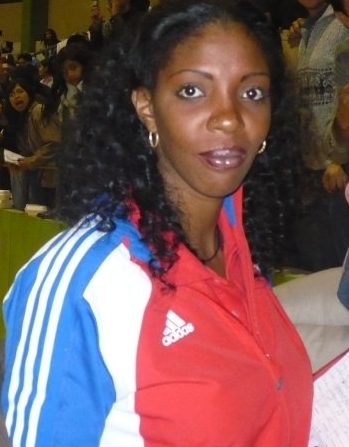
Regla Torres won three straight gold medals with Cuba.

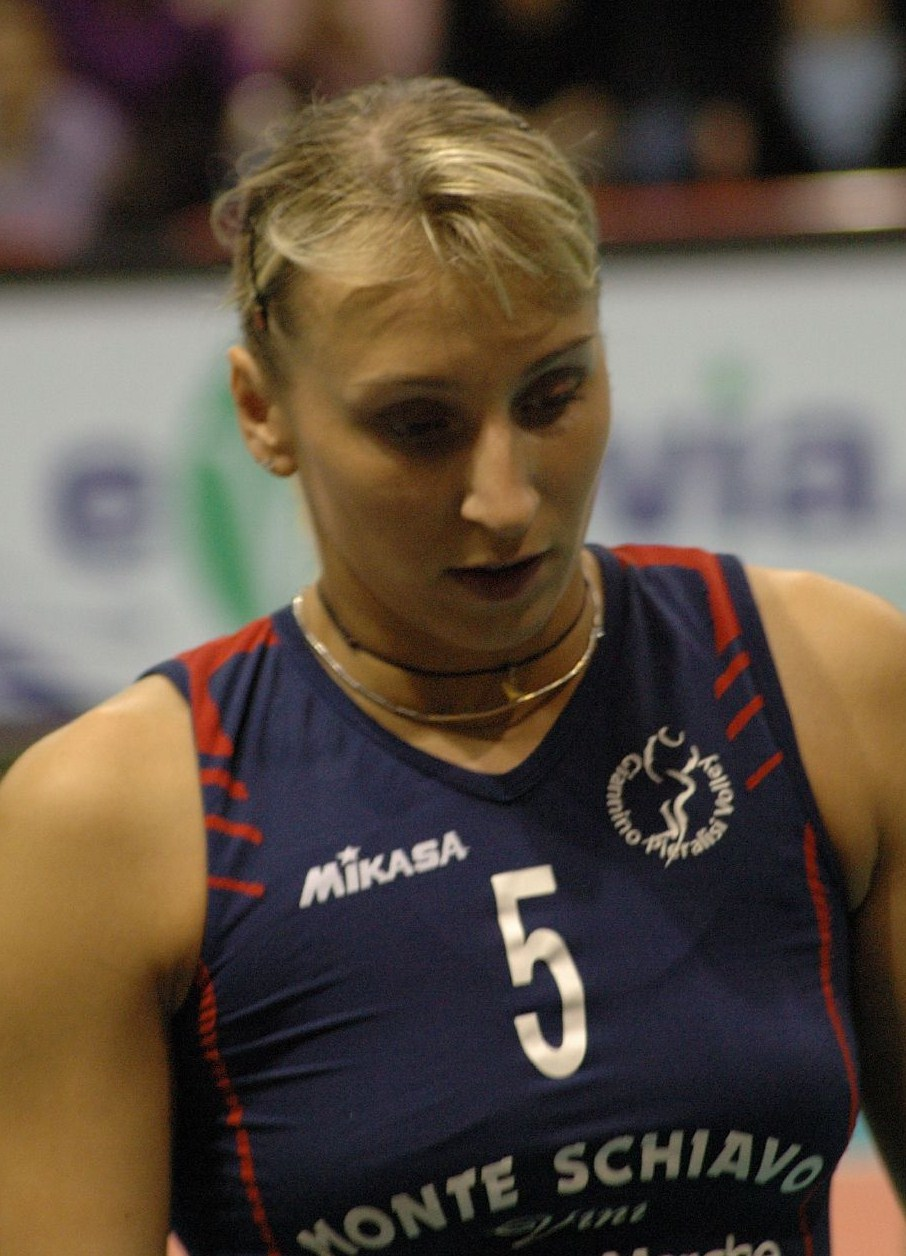
Lioubov Kılıç, twice a silver medalist for Russia

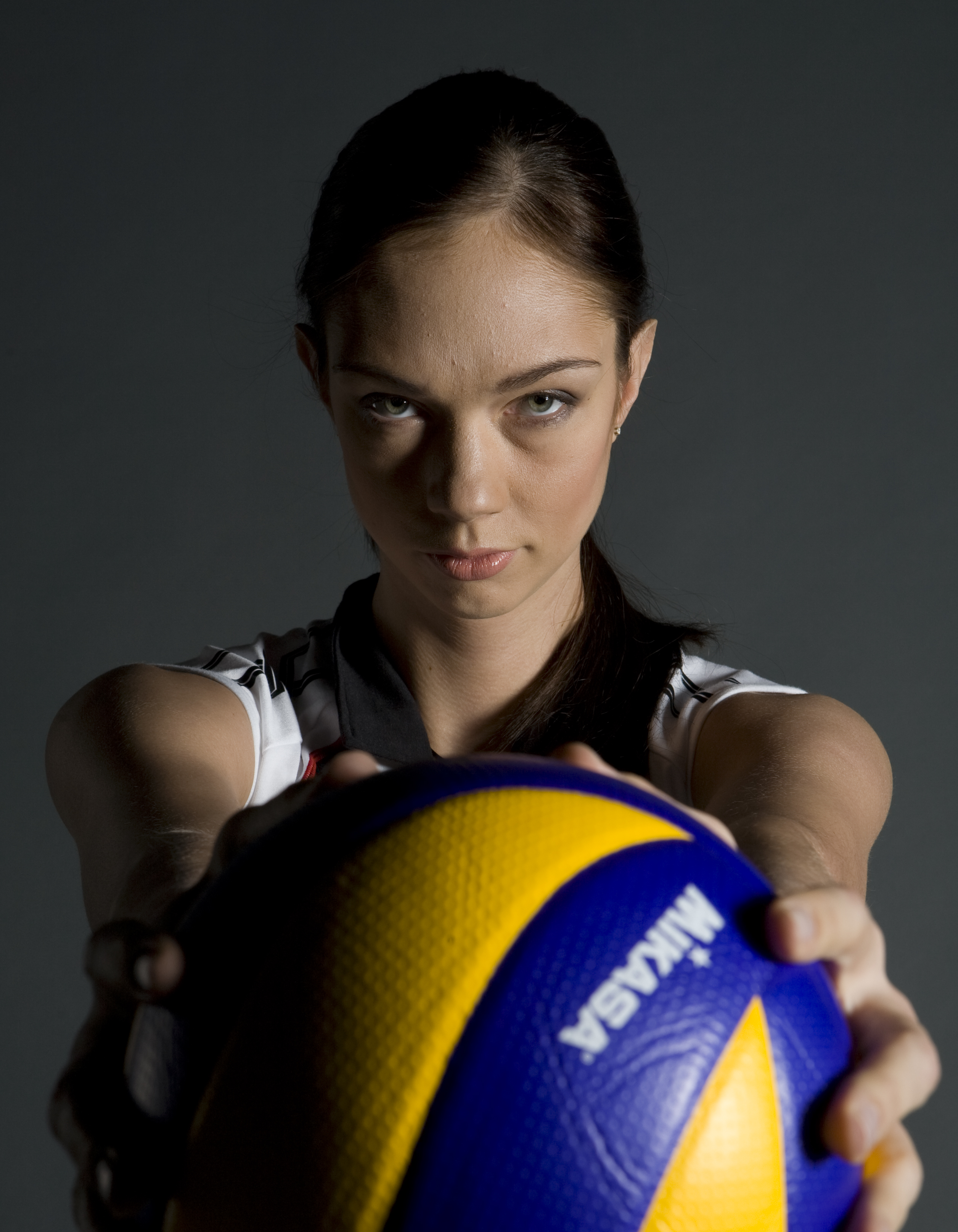
Two-time silver medalist Yekaterina Gamova

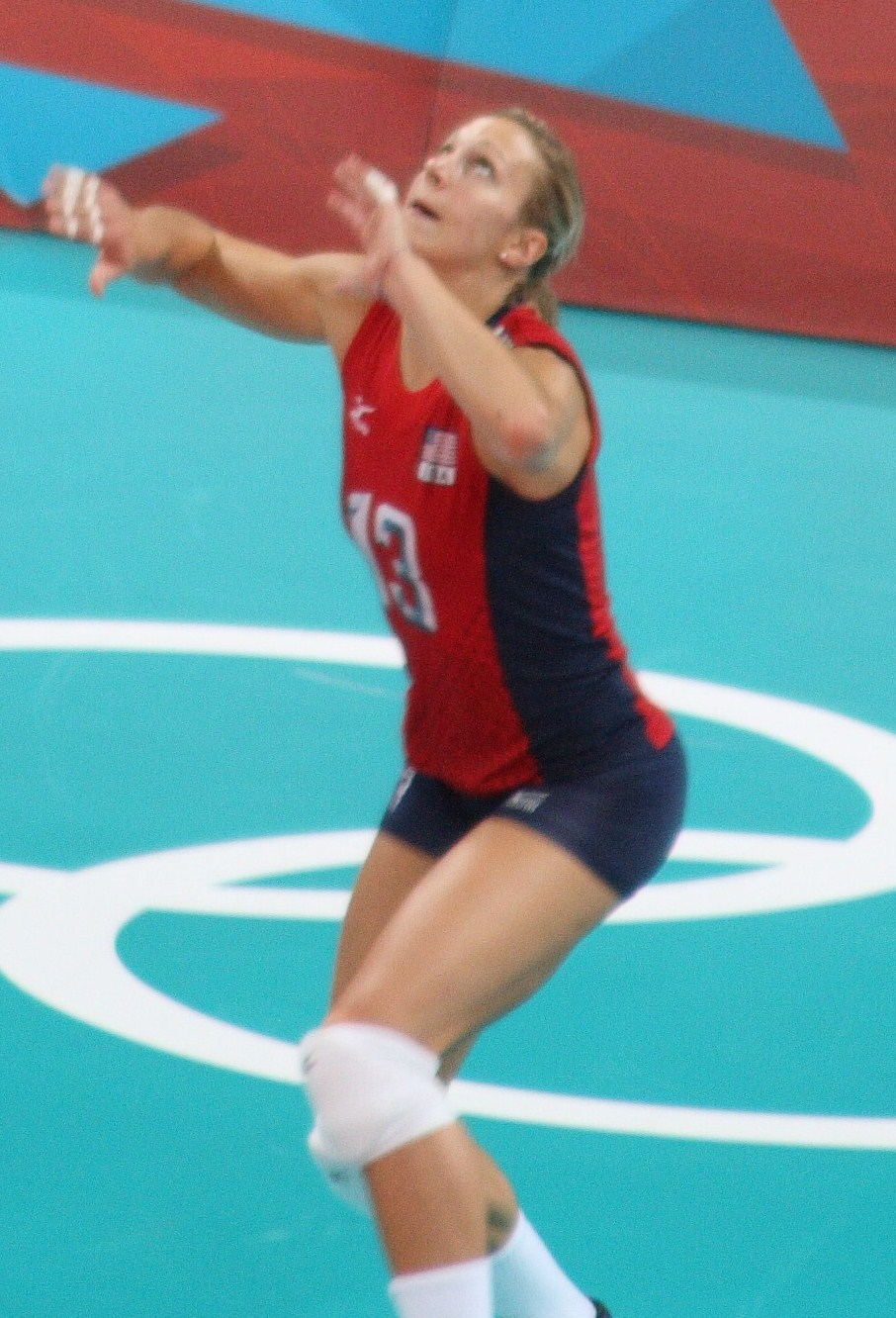
Christa Harmotto won a silver medal and a bronze with the United States.

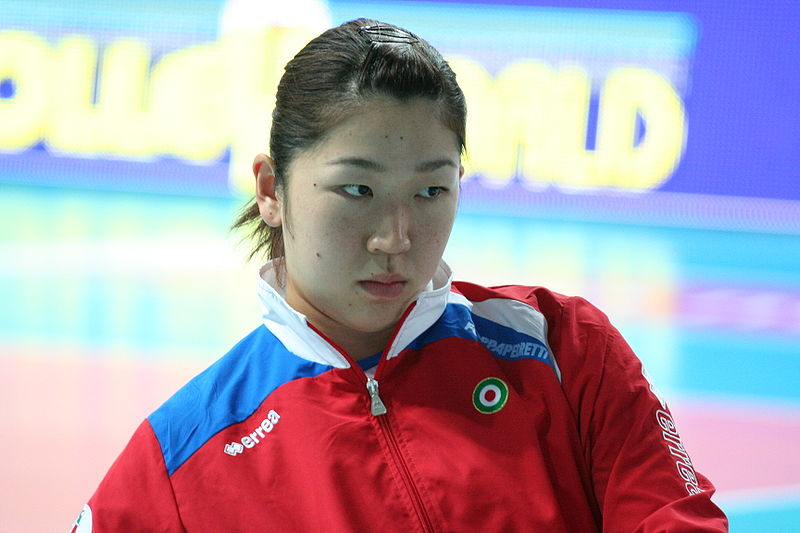
Erika Araki won a bronze medal with the Japanese team in 2012.

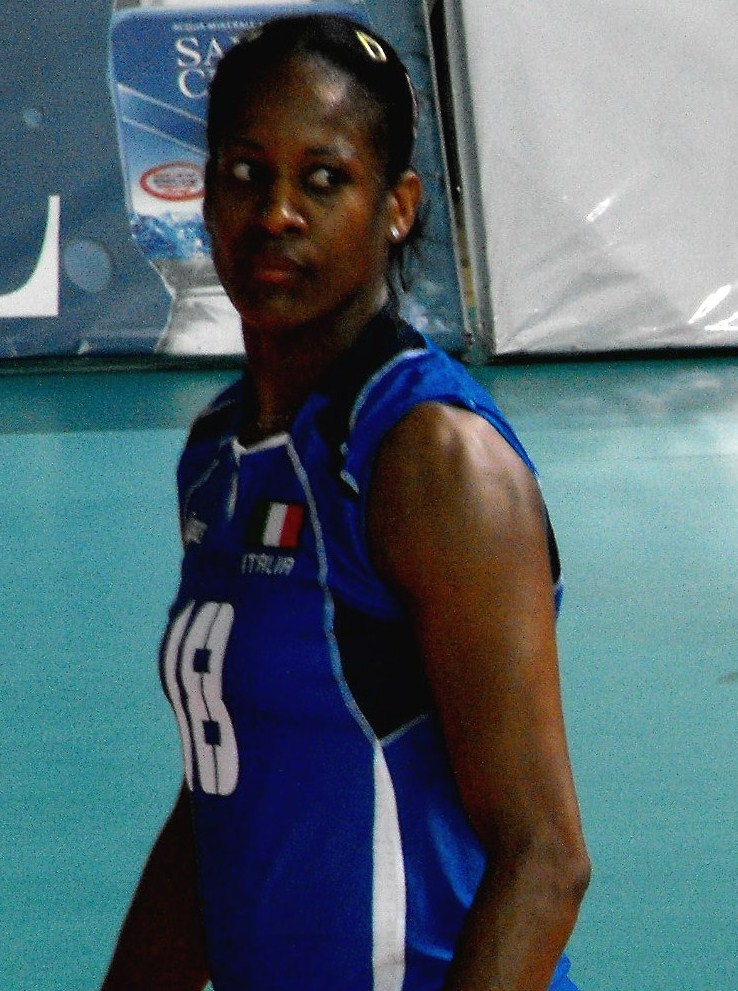
Taismary Agüero won two gold medals with Cuba, before participating in 2008 with the Italian team.

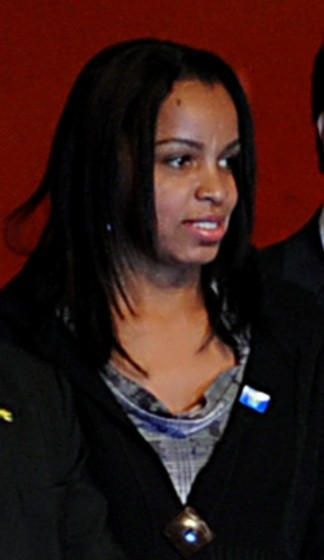
Hélia Souza has won three medals, and has participated in five Olympics for Brazil.

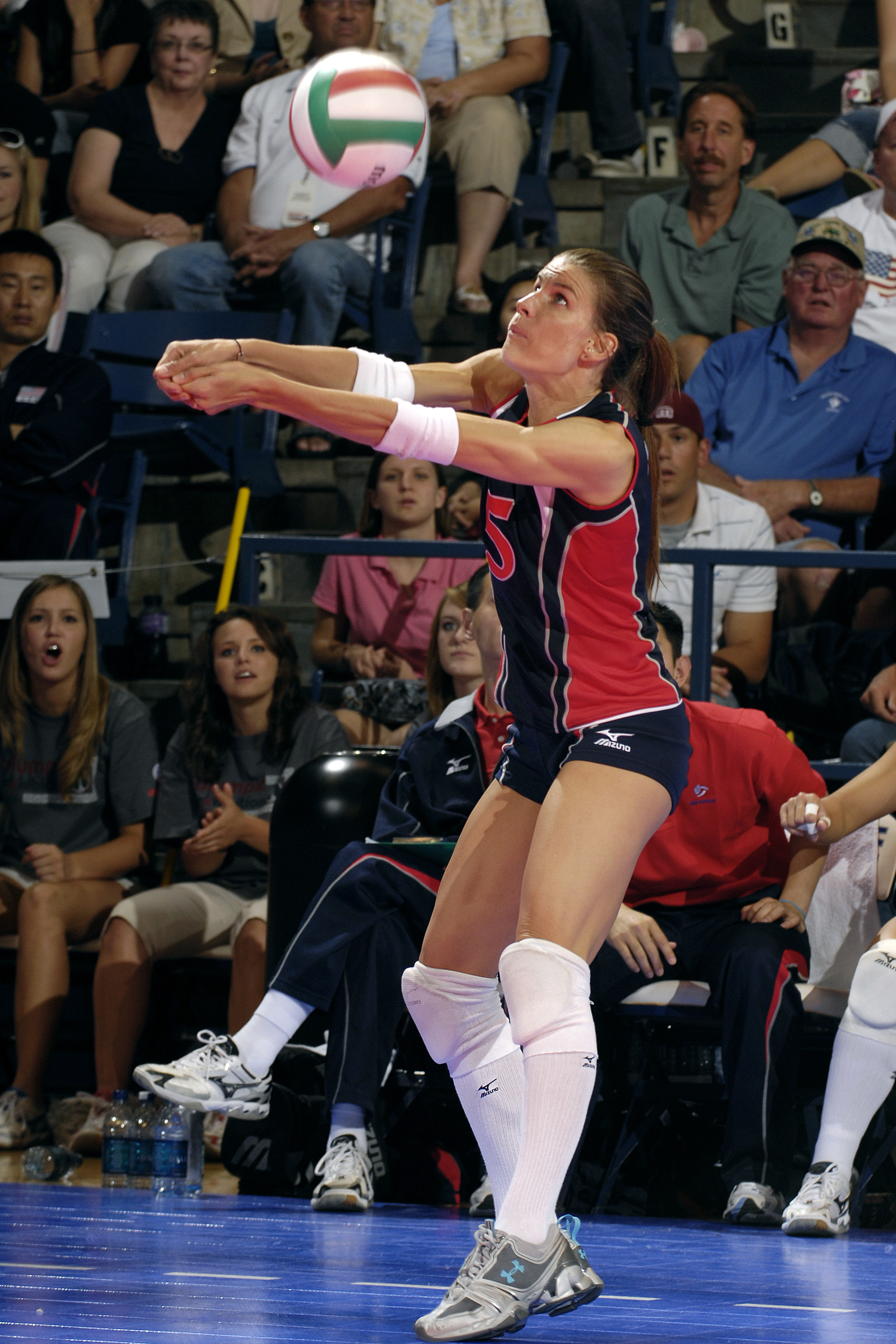
Stacy Sykora returns a ball during a warm-up match preceding the 2008 Olympics.

Games	Gold	Silver	Bronze
1964 Tokyo	Japan; Yuko Fujimoto; Yuriko Handa; Sata Isobe; Masae Kasai; Masako Kondo; Katsumi Matsumura; Yoshiko Matsumura; Emiko Miyamoto; Setsuko Sasaki; Ayano Shibuki; Yoko Shinozaki; Kinuko Tanida	Soviet Union; Antonina Ryzhova; Astra Biltauer; Ninel Lukanina; Lyudmila Buldakova; Nelli Abramova; Tamara Tikhonina; Valentina Kamenyok-Vinogradova; Inna Ryskal; Marita Katusheva; Tatyana Roshchina; Valentina Mishak; Lyudmila Gureyeva	Poland; Hanna Busz; Krystyna Czajkowska; Maria Golimowska; Barbara Hermel; Krystyna Jakubowska; Danuta Kordaczuk; Krystyna Krupa; Józefa Ledwig; Jadwiga Marko; Jadwiga Rutkowska; Maria Śliwka; Zofia Szczęśniewska
1968 Mexico City	Soviet Union; Lyudmila Buldakova; Lyudmila Mikhaylovskaya; Tatyana Veinberga; Vera Lantratova; Vera Galushka-Duyunova; Tatyana Sarycheva; Tatyana Ponyayeva-Tretyakova; Nina Smoleeva; Inna Ryskal; Galina Leontyeva; Rosa Salikhova; Valentina Kamenyok-Vinogradova	Japan; Sachiko Fukunaka; Makiko Furukawa; Keiko Hama; Setsuko Inoue; Toyoko Iwahara; Yōko Kasahara; Yukiyo Kojima; Sumie Oinuma; Aiko Onozawa; Kunie Shishikura; Suzue Takayama; Setsuko Yoshida	Poland; Halina Aszkiełowicz; Lidia Chmielnicka; Krystyna Czajkowska; Krystyna Jakubowska; Krystyna Krupa; Jadwiga Książek; Józefa Ledwig; Barbara Niemczyk; Krystyna Ostromęcka; Elżbieta Porzec; Zofia Szczęśniewska; Wanda Wiecha
1972 Munich	Soviet Union; Lyudmila Borozna; Lyudmila Buldakova; Vera Galushka-Duyunova; Tatyana Gonobobleva; Nataliya Kudreva; Galina Leontyeva; Tatyana Ponyayeva-Tretyakova; Inna Ryskal; Rosa Salikhova; Tatyana Sarycheva; Nina Smoleeva; Lyubov Tyurina	Japan; Makiko Furukawa; Keiko Hama; Takako Iida; Toyoko Iwahara; Katsumi Matsumura; Sumie Oinuma; Mariko Okamoto; Seiko Shimakage; Michiko Shiokawa; Takako Shirai; Noriko Yamashita; Yaeko Yamazaki	North Korea; Hwang He-suk; Jang Ok-rim; Jong Ok-jin; Kang Ok-sun; Kim Zung-bok; Kim Myong-suk; Kim Su-dae; Kim Yeun-ja; Paek Myong-suk; Ri Chun-ok; Ryom Chun-ja
1976 Montreal	Japan; Yuko Arakida; Takako Iida; Katsuko Kanesaka; Kiyomi Kato; Echiko Maeda; Noriko Matsuda; Mariko Okamoto; Takako Shirai; Shoko Takayanagi; Hiromi Yano; Juri Yokoyama; Mariko Yoshida	Soviet Union; Larisa Bergen; Lyudmila Chernyshyova; Olga Kozakova; Natalya Kushnir; Nina Muradyan; Liliya Osadchaya; Anna Rostova; Lyubov Rudovskaya; Inna Ryskal; Lyudmila Shchetinina; Nina Smoleeva; Zoya Yusova	South Korea; Baik Myung-sun; Byon Kyung-ja; Chang Hee-sook; Jo Hea-jung; Jung Soon-ok; Lee Soon-bok; Lee Soon-ok; Ma Kum-ja; Park Mi-kum; Yoon Young-nae; Yu Jung-hye; Yu Kyung-hwa
1980 Moscow	Soviet Union; Yelena Akhaminova; Yelena Andreyuk; Svetlana Badulina; Lyudmila Chernyshyova; Liubov Kozyreva; Lidiya Loginova; Irina Makogonova; Svetlana Nikishina; Larisa Pavlova; Nadezhda Radzevich; Nataliya Razumova; Olga Solovova	East Germany; Katharina Bullin; Barbara Czekalla; Brigitte Fetzer; Andrea Heim; Ute Kostrzewa; Heike Lehmann; Christine Mummhardt; Karin Püschel; Karla Roffeis; Martina Schmidt; Annette Schultz; Anke Westendorf	Bulgaria; Verka Borisova; Tsvetana Bozhurina; Rositsa Dimitrova; Tanya Dimitrova; Maya Georgieva; Margarita Gerasimova; Tanya Gogova; Valentina Ilieva; Rumyana Kaisheva; Anka Khristolova; Silviya Petrunova; Galina Stancheva
1984 Los Angeles	China; Hou Yuzhu; Jiang Ying; Lang Ping; Li Yanjun; Liang Yan; Su Huijuan; Yang Xiaojun; Yang Xilan; Zhang Rongfang; Zheng Meizhu; Zhou Xiaolan; Zhu Ling	United States; Jeanne Beauprey; Carolyn Becker; Linda Chisholm; Rita Crockett; Laurie Flachmeier; Debbie Green-Vargas; Flo Hyman; Rose Magers; Kimberly Ruddins; Julie Vollertsen; Paula Weishoff; Susan Woodstra	Japan; Yumi Egami; Norie Hiro; Miyoko Hirose; Kyoko Ishida; Yoko Kagabu; Yuko Mitsuya; Keiko Miyajima; Kimie Morita; Kumi Nakada; Emiko Odaka; Sachiko Otani; Kayoko Sugiyama
1988 Seoul	Soviet Union; Valentina Ogiyenko; Yelena Volkova; Marina Kumysh; Irina Smirnova; Tatyana Sidorenko; Irina Parkhomchuk; Tatyana Kraynova; Olga Shkurnova; Marina Nikulina; Yelena Ovchinnikova; Olga Krivosheyeva; Svetlana Korytova	Peru; Luisa Cervera; Alejandra de la Guerra; Denisse Fajardo; Miriam Gallardo; Rosa García; Sonia Heredia; Katherine Horny; Natalia Málaga; Gabriela Pérez del Solar; Cecilia Tait; Gina Torrealva; Cenaida Uribe	China; Li Guojun; Zhou Hong; Hou Yuzhu; Wang Yajun; Yang Xilan; Su Huijuan; Ying Jiang; Cui Yongmei; Yang Xiaojun; Zheng Meizhu; Wu Dan; Li Yueming
1992 Barcelona	Cuba; Regla Bell; Mercedes Calderón; Magaly Carvajal; Marlenis Costa; Idalmis Gato; Lilia Izquierdo; Norka Latamblet; Mireya Luis; Tania Ortiz; Raisa O'Farril; Regla Torres; Ana Fernández	Unified Team; Valentina Ogiyenko; Natalya Morozova; Marina Nikoulina; Elena Tyurina; Irina Smirnova; Tatyana Sidorenko; Tatyana Menchova; Yevgeniya Artamonova; Galina Lebedeva; Svetlana Vasilevskaya; Yelena Tcheboukina; Svetlana Korytova	United States; Liane Sato; Paula Weishoff; Yoko Zetterlund; Elaina Oden; Kimberley Oden; Teee Sanders; Caren Kemner; Ruth Lawanson; Tammy Liley; Janet Cobbs; Tara Cross-Battle; Lori Endicott
1996 Atlanta	Cuba; Taismary Agüero; Regla Bell; Magaly Carvajal; Marlenis Costa; Ana Fernández; Mirka Francia; Idalmis Gato; Lilia Izquierdo; Mireya Luis; Raisa O'Farrill; Yumilka Ruiz; Regla Torres	China; Cui Yong-Mei; He Qi; Lai Yawen; Li Yan; Liu Xiaoning; Pan Wenli; Sun Yue; Wang Lina; Wang Yi; Wang Ziling; Wu Yongmei; Zhu Yunying	Brazil; Ana Ida Alvares; Leila Barros; Filo Bodziak; Hilma Caldeira; Ana Connelly; Marcia Cunha; Virna Dias; Ana Moser; Ana Sanglard; Hélia Souza; Sandra Suruagy; Fernanda Venturini
2000 Sydney	Cuba; Taismary Agüero; Zoila Barros; Regla Bell; Marlenis Costa; Ana Fernández; Mirka Francia; Idalmis Gato; Lilia Izquierdo; Mireya Luis; Yumilka Ruiz; Marta Sánchez; Regla Torres	Russia; Yevgeniya Artamonova; Anastasiya Belikova; Lioubov Kılıç; Yekaterina Gamova; Yelena Godina; Tatyana Gracheva; Natalya Morozova; Olga Potachova; Inessa Korkmaz; Elizaveta Tishchenko; Elena Tyurina; Yelena Vasilevskaya	Brazil; Leila Barros; Erika Coimbra; Janina Conceição; Virna Dias; Kely Fraga; Ricarda Lima; Kátia Lopes; Elisângela Oliveira; Walewska Oliveira; Karin Rodrigues; Raquel Silva; Hélia Souza
2004 Athens	China; Chen Jing; Feng Kun; Li Shan; Liu Yanan; Song Nina; Wang Lina; Yang Hao; Zhang Na; Zhang Ping; Zhang Yuehong; Zhao Ruirui; Zhou Suhong	Russia; Yevgeniya Artamonova; Lioubov Kılıç; Olga Chukanova; Yekaterina Gamova; Aleksandra Korukovets; Olga Nikolaeva; Yelena Plotnikova; Natalya Safronova; Marina Sheshenina; Irina Tebenikhina; Elizaveta Tishchenko; Elena Tyurina	Cuba; Zoila Barros; Rosir Calderón; Nancy Carrillo; Ana Fernández; Maybelis Martínez; Liana Mesa; Anniara Muñoz; Yaima Ortíz; Daimí Ramírez; Yumilka Ruíz; Marta Sánchez; Dulce Téllez
2008 Beijing	Brazil; Walewska Oliveira; Carolina Albuquerque; Marianne Steinbrecher; Paula Pequeno; Thaísa Menezes; Hélia Souza; Valeska Menezes; Fabiana Claudino; Wélissa Gonzaga; Jaqueline Carvalho; Sheilla Castro; Fabiana Alvim	United States; Ogonna Nnamani; Danielle Scott-Arruda; Tayyiba Haneef-Park; Lindsey Berg; Stacy Sykora; Nicole Davis; Heather Bown; Jennifer Joines; Kim Glass; Robyn Ah Mow-Santos; Kim Willoughby; Logan Tom	China; Wang Yimei; Feng Kun; Yang Hao; Liu Yanan; Wei Qiuyue; Xu Yunli; Zhou Suhong; Zhao Ruirui; Xue Ming; Li Juan; Zhang Na; Ma Yunwen
2012 London	Brazil; Fabiana Claudino; Dani Lins; Paula Pequeno; Adenízia da Silva; Thaísa Menezes; Jaqueline Carvalho; Fernanda Ferreira; Tandara Caixeta; Natália Pereira; Sheilla Castro; Fabiana de Oliveira; Fernanda Garay	United States; Danielle Scott-Arruda; Tayyiba Haneef-Park; Lindsey Berg; Tamari Miyashiro; Nicole Davis; Jordan Larson; Megan Hodge; Christa Harmotto; Logan Tom; Foluke Akinradewo; Courtney Thompson; Destinee Hooker	Japan; Erika Araki; Yukiko Ebata; Kaori Inoue; Maiko Kano; Saori Kimura; Hitomi Nakamichi; Ai Otomo; Saori Sakoda; Yuko Sano; Risa Shinnabe; Yoshie Takeshita; Mai Yamaguchi
2016 Rio de Janeiro	China; Ding Xia; Gong Xiangyu; Hui Ruoqi; Lin Li; Liu Xiaotong; Wei Qiuyue; Xu Yunli; Yan Ni; Yang Fangxu; Yuan Xinyue; Zhang Changning; Zhu Ting	Serbia; Tijana Bošković; Jovana Brakočević; Bianka Buša; Tijana Malešević; Brankica Mihajlović; Jelena Nikolić; Maja Ognjenović; Silvija Popović; Milena Rašić; Jovana Stevanović; Stefana Veljković; Bojana Živković	United States; Rachael Adams; Foluke Akinradewo; Kayla Banwarth; Alisha Glass; Christa Harmotto; Kimberly Hill; Jordan Larson; Carli Lloyd; Karsta Lowe; Kelly Murphy; Kelsey Robinson; Courtney Thompson
2020 Tokyo	United States; Micha Hancock; Jordyn Poulter; Justine Wong-Orantes; Jordan Larson; Annie Drews; Jordan Thompson; Michelle Bartsch-Hackley; Kimberly Hill; Foluke Akinradewo; Haleigh Washington; Kelsey Robinson; Chiaka Ogbogu	Brazil; Carol Gattaz; Rosamaria Montibeller; Macris Carneiro; Roberta Ratzke; Gabriela Guimarães; Tandara Caixeta; Natália Pereira; Ana Carolina da Silva; Fernanda Garay; Ana Cristina de Souza; Camila Brait; Ana Beatriz Corrêa	Serbia; Bianka Buša; Mina Popović; Slađana Mirković; Brankica Mihajlović; Maja Ognjenović; Ana Bjelica; Maja Aleksić; Milena Rašić; Silvija Popović; Tijana Bošković; Bojana Milenković; Jelena Blagojević
2024 Paris	Italy; Marina Lubian; Carlotta Cambi; Monica De Gennaro; Alessia Orro; Caterina Bosetti; Anna Danesi (c); Myriam Sylla; Paola Egonu; Sarah Fahr; Loveth Omoruyi; Ekaterina Antropova; Gaia Giovannini; Ilaria Spirito	United States; Micha Hancock; Jordyn Poulter; Avery Skinner; Justine Wong-Orantes; Lauren Carlini; Jordan Larson; Annie Drews; Jordan Thompson; Haleigh Washington; Dana Rettke; Kathryn Plummer; Kelsey Robinson Cook; Chiaka Ogbogu	Brazil; Nyeme Costa; Diana Duarte; Macris Carneiro; Thaísa Menezes; Rosamaria Montibeller; Roberta Ratzke; Gabriela Guimarães; Ana Cristina de Souza; Natália Araújo; Ana Carolina da Silva; Júlia Bergmann; Tainara Santos; Lorenne Teixeira
2028 Los Angeles			

== Beach volleyball ==
=== Men ===
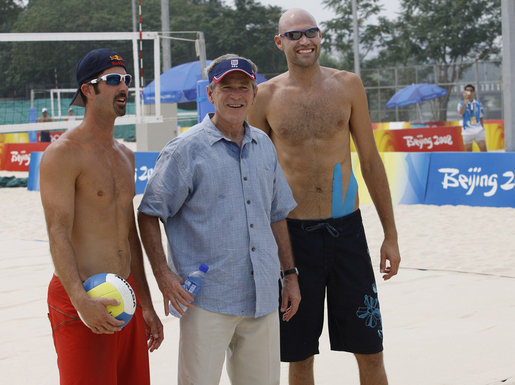
Todd Rogers (left) and Phil Dalhausser (right), gold medalists in 2008, pose with George W. Bush at the Beijing Olympics.

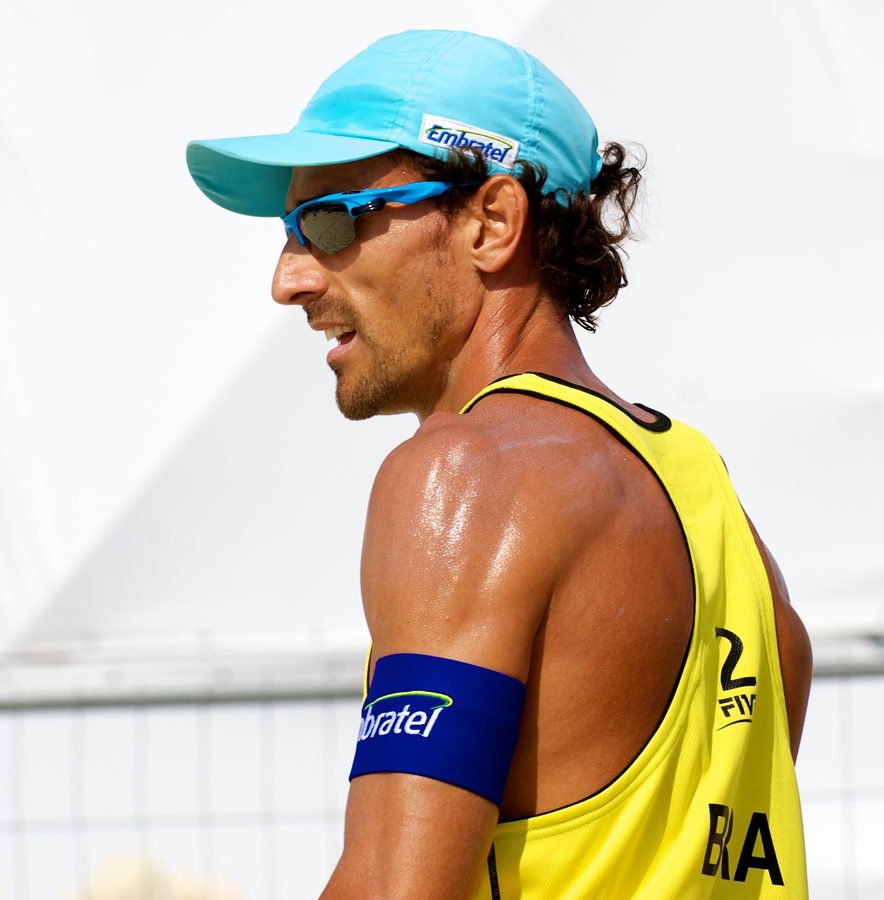
Emanuel Rego appeared in the first five beach volleyball tournaments, winning three medals.

Games	Gold	Silver	Bronze
1996 Atlanta	Karch Kiraly and Kent Steffes (USA)	Michael Dodd and Mike Whitmarsh (USA)	John Child and Mark Heese (CAN)
2000 Sydney	Dain Blanton and Eric Fonoimoana (USA)	Zé Marco de Melo and Ricardo Santos (BRA)	Axel Hager and Jörg Ahmann (GER)
2004 Athens	Ricardo Santos and Emanuel Rego (BRA)	Javier Bosma and Pablo Herrera (ESP)	Stefan Kobel and Patrick Heuscher (SUI)
2008 Beijing	Phil Dalhausser and Todd Rogers (USA)	Márcio Araújo and Fábio Luiz Magalhães (BRA)	Ricardo Santos and Emanuel Rego (BRA)
2012 London	Julius Brink and Jonas Reckermann (GER)	Alison Cerutti and Emanuel Rego (BRA)	Mārtiņš Pļaviņš and Jānis Šmēdiņš (LAT)
2016 Rio de Janeiro	Alison Cerutti and Bruno Oscar Schmidt (BRA)	Daniele Lupo and Paolo Nicolai (ITA)	Alexander Brouwer and Robert Meeuwsen (NED)
2020 Tokyo	Anders Mol and Christian Sørum (NOR)	Viacheslav Krasilnikov and Oleg Stoyanovskiy (ROC)	Ahmed Tijan and Cherif Younousse (QAT)
2024 Paris	David Åhman and Jonatan Hellvig (SWE)	Nils Ehlers and Clemens Wickler (GER)	Anders Mol and Christian Sørum (NOR)
2028 Los Angeles			

=== Women ===
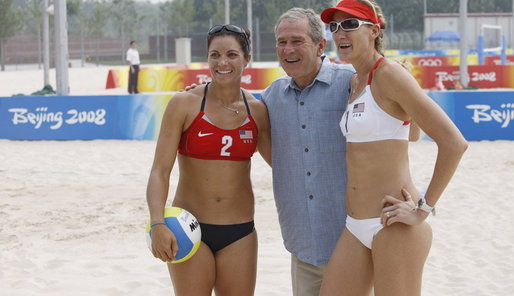
Misty May-Treanor (left) and Kerri Walsh Jennings (right) are the only women's team to earn multiple (3) gold medals in beach volleyball.

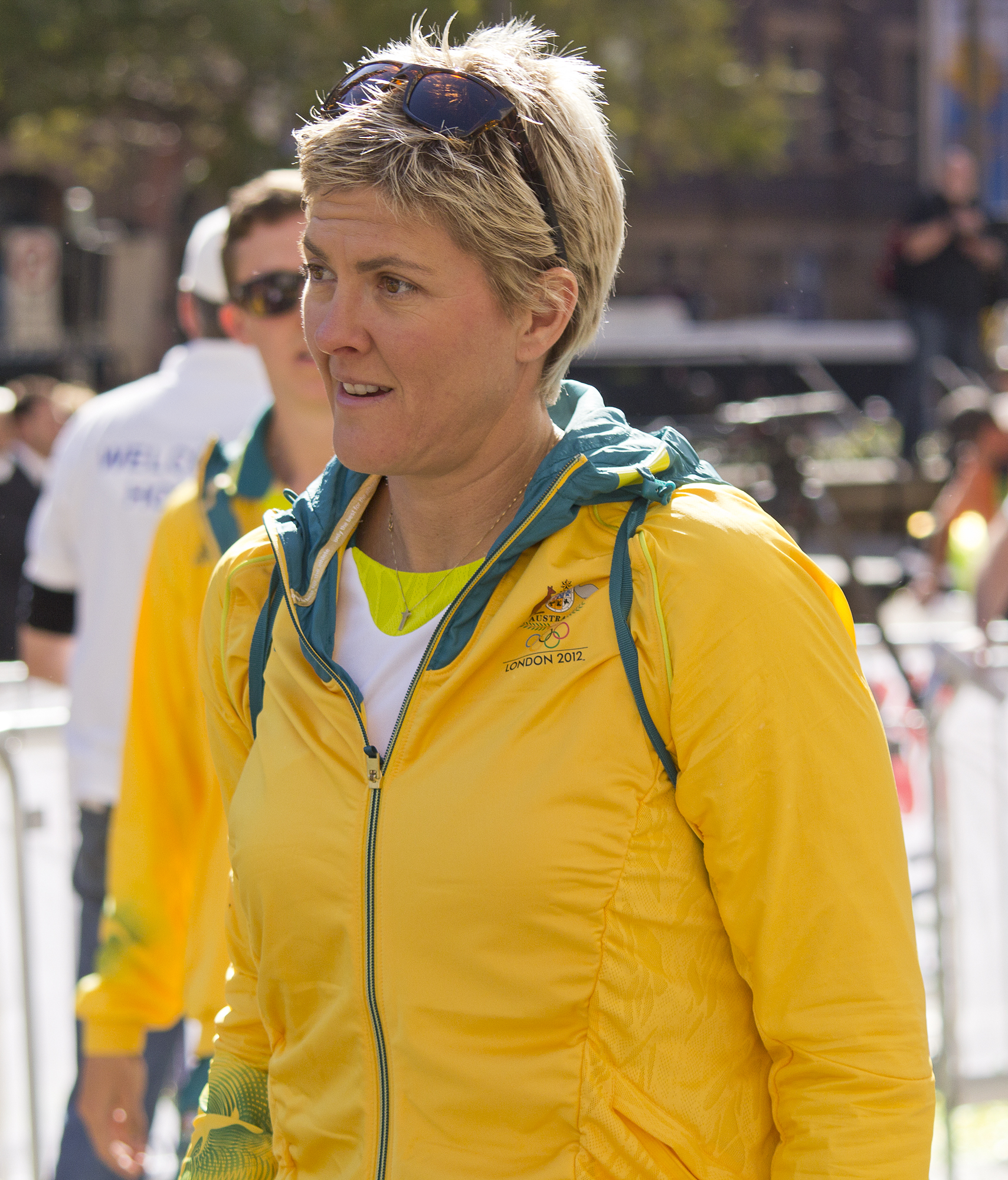
Natalie Cook, winner of a gold and a bronze, is the first Australian woman to compete at five Olympic Games.

Games	Gold	Silver	Bronze
1996 Atlanta	Jackie Silva and Sandra Pires (BRA)	Mônica Rodrigues and Adriana Samuel (BRA)	Natalie Cook and Kerri Pottharst (AUS)
2000 Sydney	Natalie Cook and Kerri Pottharst (AUS)	Adriana Behar and Shelda Bede (BRA)	Adriana Samuel and Sandra Pires (BRA)
2004 Athens	Kerri Walsh and Misty May (USA)	Shelda Bede and Adriana Behar (BRA)	Holly McPeak and Elaine Youngs (USA)
2008 Beijing	Kerri Walsh and Misty May-Treanor (USA)	Wang Jie and Tian Jia (CHN)	Xue Chen and Zhang Xi (CHN)
2012 London	Kerri Walsh Jennings and Misty May-Treanor (USA)	Jennifer Kessy and April Ross (USA)	Juliana Felisberta and Larissa França (BRA)
2016 Rio de Janeiro	Laura Ludwig and Kira Walkenhorst (GER)	Ágatha Bednarczuk and Bárbara Seixas (BRA)	April Ross and Kerri Walsh Jennings (USA)
2020 Tokyo	Alix Klineman and April Ross (USA)	Mariafe Artacho del Solar and Taliqua Clancy (AUS)	Joana Heidrich and Anouk Vergé-Dépré (SUI)
2024 Paris	Ana Patrícia and Duda Lisboa (BRA)	Melissa Humana-Paredes and Brandie Wilkerson (CAN)	Tanja Hüberli and Nina Betschart (SUI)
2028 Los Angeles			

== Statistics ==
=== Medal leaders ===
Athletes who have won three or more medals are listed below.

Athlete	Nation	Olympics				Total	Gold	Silver	Bronze	Discipline	Gender
Ana Fernández	Cuba	1992	1996	2000	2004	4	3	0	1	Indoor	Female
Kerri Walsh Jennings	United States	2004	2008	2012	2016	4	3	0	1	Beach	Female
Inna Ryskal	Soviet Union	1964	1968	1972	1976	4	2	2	0	Indoor	Female
Sérgio Santos	Brazil	2004	2008	2012	2016	4	2	2	0	Indoor	Male
Jordan Larson	United States	2012	2016	2020	2024	4	1	2	1	Indoor	Female
Sergey Tetyukhin	Russia	2000	2004	2008	2012	4	1	1	2	Indoor	Male
Samuele Papi	Italy	1996	2000	2004	2012	4	0	2	2	Indoor	Male
Karch Kiraly	United States	1984	1988	1996		3	3	0	0	Indoor (2); Beach (1)	Male
Mireya Luis	Cuba	1992	1996	2000		3	3	0	0	Indoor	Female
Marlenis Costa	Cuba	1992	1996	2000		3	3	0	0	Indoor	Female
Regla Torres	Cuba	1992	1996	2000		3	3	0	0	Indoor	Female
Regla Bell	Cuba	1992	1996	2000		3	3	0	0	Indoor	Female
Misty May-Treanor	United States	2004	2008	2012		3	3	0	0	Beach	Female
Lyudmila Buldakova	Soviet Union	1964	1968	1972		3	2	1	0	Indoor	Female
Nina Smoleeva	Soviet Union	1968	1972	1976		3	2	1	0	Indoor	Female
Steve Timmons	United States	1984	1988	1992		3	2	0	1	Indoor	Male
Yumilka Ruíz	Cuba	1996	2000	2004		3	2	0	1	Indoor	Female
Yuriy Poyarkov	Soviet Union	1964	1968	1972		3	2	0	1	Indoor	Male
Vyacheslav Zaytsev	Soviet Union	1976	1980	1988		3	1	2	0	Indoor	Male
Dante Amaral	Brazil	2004	2008	2012		3	1	2	0	Indoor	Male
Gilberto Godoy Filho	Brazil	2004	2008	2012		3	1	2	0	Indoor	Male
Rodrigo Santana	Brazil	2004	2008	2012		3	1	2	0	Indoor	Male
Bruno Rezende	Brazil	2008	2012	2016		3	1	2	0	Indoor	Male
Masayuki Minami	Japan	1964	1968	1972		3	1	1	1	Indoor	Male
Katsutoshi Nekoda	Japan	1964	1968	1972		3	1	1	1	Indoor	Male
Vladimir Kondra	Soviet Union	1972	1976	1980		3	1	1	1	Indoor	Male
Ricardo Santos	Brazil	2000	2004	2008		3	1	1	1	Beach	Male
Emanuel Rego	Brazil	2004	2008	2012		3	1	1	1	Beach	Male
Foluke Akinradewo	United States	2012	2016	2020		3	1	1	1	Indoor	Female
Kelsey Robinson	United States	2016	2020	2024		3	1	1	1	Indoor	Female
Hélia Souza	Brazil	1996	2000	2004	2008	3	1	0	2	Indoor	Female
Yelena Tyurina	Russia	1992	1996	2000	2004	3	0	3	0	Indoor	Female
Yevgeniya Artamonova	Russia	1992	1996	2000	2004	3	0	3	0	Indoor	Female
Andrea Sartoretti	Italy	1996	2000	2004		3	0	2	1	Indoor	Male
Andrea Giani	Italy	1996	2000	2004		3	0	2	1	Indoor	Male
Paolo Tofoli	Italy	1996	2000	2004		3	0	2	1	Indoor	Male
Vadim Khamuttskikh	Russia	2000	2004	2008		3	0	1	2	Indoor	Male
Aleksey Kuleshov	Russia	2000	2004	2008		3	0	1	2	Indoor	Male
Alessandro Fei	Italy	2000	2004	2012		3	0	1	2	Indoor	Male
Luigi Mastrangelo	Italy	2000	2004	2012		3	0	1	2	Indoor	Male
Thaísa Menezes	Brazil	2008	2012	2016	2024	3	2	0	1	Indoor	Female

=== Medals as coach and player (indoor only) ===
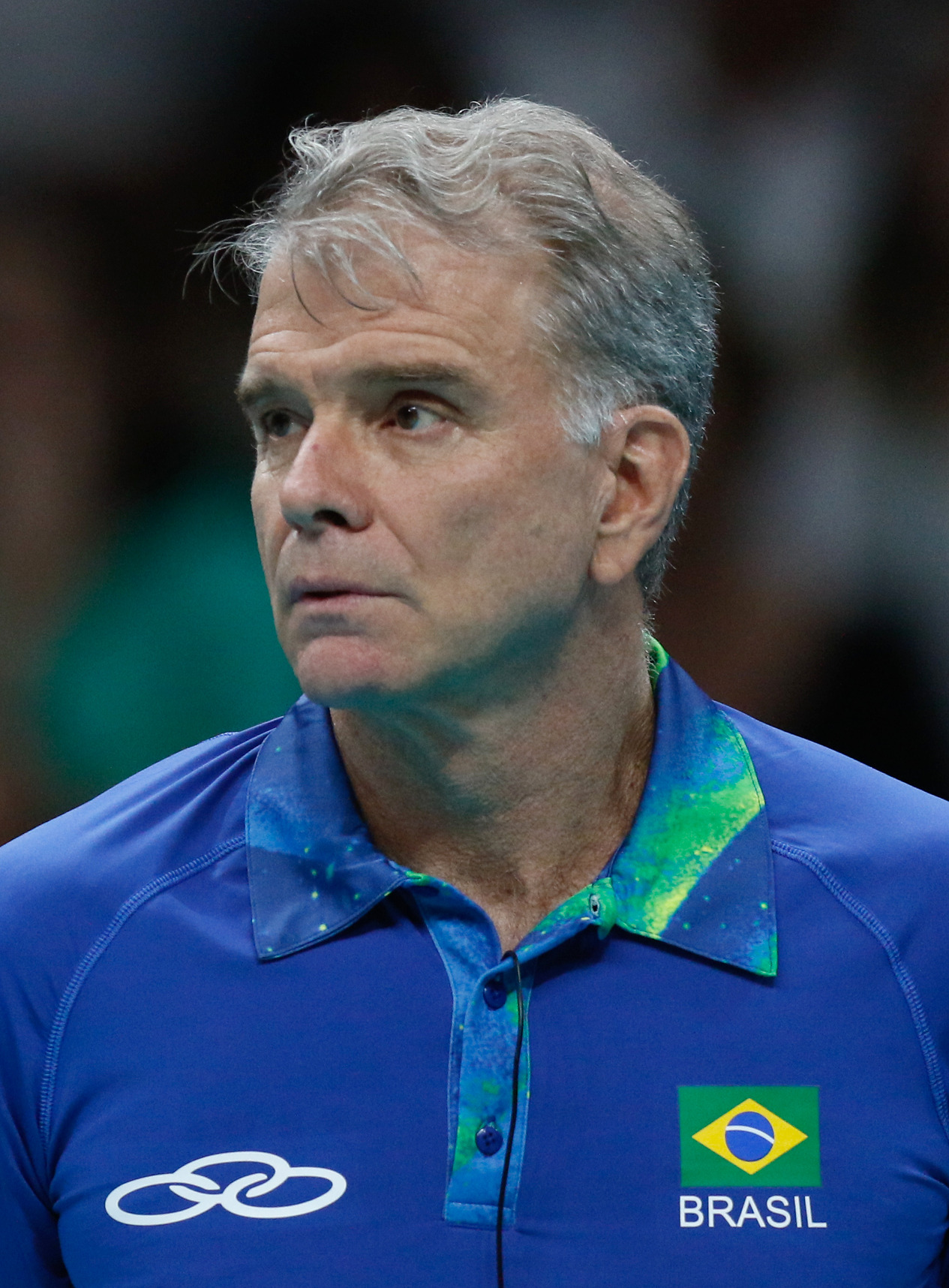
Bernardo Rezende won a silver medal as part of the Brazilian team in 1984, and went on to coach both the men and women to six straight medals.

Only four volleyball players won medals and then coached indoor teams to the podium. Aside from Lang Ping, who led the United States' women to the silver in 2008, all were managers of their own country's team.

Athlete	Nation	As player	As coach	Total
Bernardo Rezende	Brazil	1 (Silver, 1984)	6 (Gold, 2004 and 2016 men; Silver, 2008 and 2012 men; Bronze, 1996 and 2000 women)	7
Lang Ping	China	1 (Gold, 1984)	3 (Gold, 2016 women; Silver, 1996 and 2008 women)	4
Karch Kiraly	United States	2 (Gold, 1984 and 1988)	3 (Gold, 2020 women; Silver, 2024 women; Bronze, 2016 women)	4
Yuri Chesnokov	Soviet Union	1 (Gold, 1964)	2 (Silver, 1972 men; Bronze, 1976 men)	3

== See also ==
- Lists of Olympic medalists

== Notes ==
2. Several of the names listed here are spelled differently from in the corresponding Wikipedia article. This article follows the spelling given in the IOC's database of medal winners.
3. Some Brazilian players are better known by their apelidos (nicknames) than their birth names, and may have Wikipedia articles at those locations instead of their birth names.
