= South Korea at the 1976 Summer Olympics =

- IOC code: KOR
- NOC: Korean Olympic Committee

in Montreal
- Competitors: 38 in 5 sports
- Medals Ranked 19th: Gold 1 Silver 1 Bronze 4 Total 6

Summer Olympics appearances (overview)
- 1948; 1952; 1956; 1960; 1964; 1968; 1972; 1976; 1980; 1984; 1988; 1992; 1996; 2000; 2004; 2008; 2012; 2016; 2020; 2024; 2028

South Korea competed in the 1976 Summer Olympics in Montreal, Quebec, Canada. Yang Jung-mo won the country's first gold medal, in wrestling. However, he was not the first Korean to become an Olympic champion. That honor belongs to Sohn Kee-chung, who won the marathon at the 1936 Summer Olympics in Berlin, but at that time Korea was ruled by the Empire of Japan.

== Medalists ==
Medal	Name	Sport	Event	Date
Gold	Yang Jung-mo	Wrestling	Men's freestyle 62 kg	31 July
Silver	Chang Eun-kyung	Judo	Men's 63 kg	30 July
Bronze	Park Young-chul	Judo	Men's 80 kg	28 July
Bronze	South Korea women's national volleyball team: Baik Myung-sun; Byon Kyung-ja; Chang Hee-sook; Jo Hea-jung; Lee Soon-ok; Lee Soon-bok; Ma Kum-ja; Park Mi-kum; Yu Jung-hye; Yu Kyung-hwa; Jung Soon-ok; Yoon Young-nae	Volleyball	Women's tournament	30 July
Bronze	Cho Jea-ki	Judo	Men's open category	31 July
Bronze	Jeon Hae-sup	Wrestling	Men's freestyle 52 kg	31 July

== Boxing ==
Men's Light Flyweight (–48 kg)

- Park Chan-hee
  1. First round — defeated Abderahim Najim (MAR), DSQ-3
  2. Second round — defeated Alican Az (TUR), 5-0
  3. Quarterfinals — lost to Jorge Hernández (CUB), 2-3

== Judo ==
Chang Eun-kyung lost in the 63 kg final to Cuban Héctor Rodríguez.

Park Young-chul won the bronze medal in the 80 kg weight class, while Cho Jea-Ki also won a bronze in the open class.

== Shooting ==
There were five South Korean shooters who qualified to compete in the following events:

Open

Athlete	Event	Final	
Athlete	Event	Points	Rank
Choi Chung-seok	50 m rifle prone	583	57
Park Do-geun	Skeet	172	61
Lee Gyun	50 m rifle prone	581	64
Park Jong-Gil	25 m rapid fire pistol	587	15
Lee Seung-Gyun	Skeet	191	22

== Volleyball ==
=== Men ===
- Preliminary round (group A)

- Lost to Poland (2-3)
- Defeated Canada (3-0)
- Lost to Cuba (0-3)
- Lost to Czechoslovakia (3-1)

- Classification matches

- 5th/8th place: Defeated Brazil (3-2)
- 5th/6th place: Lost to Czechoslovakia (1-3) → sixth place

- Team roster

- Kim Kun-bong (김건봉, GoldStar)
- Jo Jae-hak (조재학, GoldStar)
- Lee Yong-kwan (이용관, Korea Integrated Chemical)
- Park Kee-won (박기원, Korea Integrated Chemical)
- Chong Moon-kyong (정문경, GoldStar)
- Lee Sun-koo (이선구, Korea Electric Power)
- Lee Choun-pyo (이춘표, Korea Integrated Chemical)
- Lee In (이인, Korea Electric Power)
- Kim Chung-han (김충한, GoldStar)
- Lee Jong-won (이종원, Kyonggi University)
- Kang Man-soo (강만수, Hanyang University)
- Lim Ho-dam (임호담, Myongji University)

- Head coach: Lee Kyo-so (이규소, Korea Volleyball Association)

=== Women ===
- Preliminary round (group B)

- Lost to Soviet Union (1–3)
- Defeated East Germany (3–2)
- Defeated Cuba (3–2)

- Semifinals

- Lost to Japan (0–3)

- Bronze medal match

- Defeated Hungary (3–1) → bronze medal

- Team roster

- Lee Soon-bok
- Yu Jung-hye
- Byon Kyung-ja
- Lee Soon-ok
- Baik Myung-sun
- Chang Hee-sook
- Ma Kum-ja
- Yoon Young-nae
- Yu Kyung-hwa
- Park Mi-kum
- Jo Hea-jung
- Jung Soon-ok

- Head coach: Kim Han-soo

== Wrestling ==
Yang Jung-mo prevailed in the men's freestyle 62 kg weight class, giving South Korea its first-ever gold medal.

The event ran from 27-31 July. Elimination from the competition was based on negative points, which were awarded for anything other than a fall (pinning the opponent's shoulder to the mat). A wrestler was knocked out after accumulating six points, though he could not be eliminated after a victory. Once there were only three grapplers left, the final began.

Yang, American Gene Davis and Mongolian Zevegiin Oidov (who had won two straight world championships in 1974 and 1975) were the final three. Each man had to wrestle the other two. Yang pinned Davis, and was leading Oidov 8-6 in the third round, but ended up losing 8-10. However, Davis defeated Oidov, leaving all three finalists with a 1-1 record. It came down to penalty points. Yang had three, Oidov four and Davis five, making Yang the victor.

Joen Hae-sup was the men's freestyle 52 kg bronze medalist.
