= 1975 Women's European Volleyball Championship =

Tournament details
- Host country: Yugoslavia
- Dates: 18 – 25 October
- Teams: 12
- Venue: Various (in 4 host cities)

Final positions
- Champions: Soviet Union (8th title)

The 1975 Women's European Volleyball Championship was the ninth edition of the event, organised by Europe's governing volleyball body, the Confédération Européenne de Volleyball. It was hosted in several cities in Yugoslavia from 18 to 25 October 1975, with the final round held in Belgrade.

== Participating teams ==
- Belgium
- Bulgaria
- Czechoslovakia
- East Germany
- Hungary
- Italy
- Netherlands
- Poland
- Romania
- Soviet Union
- West Germany
- Yugoslavia

== Format ==
The tournament was played in two different stages. In the first stage, the twelve participants were divided into three groups of four teams each. In the second stage, two groups were formed, one containing the winners and runners-up from all first stage groups (six teams in total) to contest the tournament title. A second group was formed by the remaining six teams which played for position places (7th to 12th). All groups in both stages played a single round-robin format.

== Pools composition ==
Pool 1	Pool 2	Pool 3
East Germany	Bulgaria	Belgium
Hungary	Netherlands	Czechoslovakia
West Germany	Romania	Italy
Yugoslavia	Soviet Union	Poland

== Venues ==
Pool 1	Pool 2	Tournament host cities
Rijeka	Banja Luka	Tournament host cities
Pool 3	Final round	Tournament host cities
Negotin	Belgrade	Tournament host cities

== Preliminary round ==
=== Pool 1 ===
- venue location: Rijeka, Yugoslavia

Pos	Team	Pld	W	L	Pts	SW	SL	SR	SPW	SPL	SPR	Qualification
1	Hungary	3	3	0	6	9	1	9.000	144	76	1.895	Final pool
2	East Germany	3	2	1	5	7	3	2.333	133	92	1.446	Final pool
3	Yugoslavia	3	1	2	4	3	7	0.429	99	133	0.744	7th–12th pool
4	West Germany	3	0	3	3	1	9	0.111	70	145	0.483	7th–12th pool

Date		Score		Set 1	Set 2	Set 3	Set 4	Set 5	Total	Report
18 Oct	Yugoslavia	3–1	West Germany	15–11	10–15	15–10	15–7		55–43	Report
18 Oct	Hungary	3–1	East Germany	15–7	9–15	15–8	15–13		54–43	Report
19 Oct	Yugoslavia	0–3	East Germany	10–15	8–15	7–15			24–45	Report
19 Oct	Hungary	3–0	West Germany	15–4	15–0	15–10			45–14	Report
20 Oct	Yugoslavia	0–3	Hungary	13–15	4–15	2–15			19–45	Report
20 Oct	East Germany	3–0	West Germany	15–7	15–2	15–4			45–13	Report

=== Pool 2 ===
- venue location: Banja Luka, Yugoslavia

Pos	Team	Pld	W	L	Pts	SW	SL	SR	SPW	SPL	SPR	Qualification
1	Soviet Union	3	3	0	6	9	2	4.500	150	93	1.613	Final pool
2	Bulgaria	3	2	1	5	7	4	1.750	132	116	1.138	Final pool
3	Romania	3	1	2	4	5	6	0.833	132	142	0.930	7th–12th pool
4	Netherlands	3	0	3	3	0	9	0.000	72	135	0.533	7th–12th pool

Date		Score		Set 1	Set 2	Set 3	Set 4	Set 5	Total	Report
18 Oct	Bulgaria	3–0	Netherlands	15–6	15–3	15–7			45–16	Report
18 Oct	Soviet Union	3–1	Romania	15–10	15–9	8–15	15–5		53–39	Report
19 Oct	Soviet Union	3–0	Netherlands	15–10	15–1	15–10			45–21	Report
19 Oct	Bulgaria	3–1	Romania	15–8	15–12	9–15	15–13		54–48	Report
20 Oct	Romania	3–0	Netherlands	15–10	15–13	15–12			45–35	Report
20 Oct	Soviet Union	3–1	Bulgaria	15–4	7–15	15–12	15–2		52–33	Report

=== Pool 3 ===
- venue location: Negotin, Yugoslavia

Pos	Team	Pld	W	L	Pts	SW	SL	SR	SPW	SPL	SPR	Qualification
1	Czechoslovakia	3	3	0	6	9	3	3.000	167	96	1.740	Final pool
2	Poland	3	2	1	5	8	4	2.000	156	113	1.381	Final pool
3	Italy	3	1	2	4	5	7	0.714	112	146	0.767	7th–12th pool
4	Belgium	3	0	3	3	1	9	0.111	63	143	0.441	7th–12th pool

Date		Score		Set 1	Set 2	Set 3	Set 4	Set 5	Total	Report
18 Oct	Czechoslovakia	3–1	Italy	13–15	15–6	15–3	15–4		58–28	Report
18 Oct	Poland	3–0	Belgium	15–10	15–4	15–4			45–18	Report
19 Oct	Italy	3–1	Belgium	15–5	15–8	8–15	15–7		53–35	Report
19 Oct	Czechoslovakia	3–2	Poland	15–8	11–15	8–15	15–7	15–13	64–58	Report
20 Oct	Czechoslovakia	3–0	Belgium	15–0	15–9	15–1			45–10	Report
20 Oct	Poland	3–1	Italy	15–2	15–4	8–15	15–10		53–31	Report

== Final round ==
- venue location: Belgrade, Yugoslavia

=== 7th–12th pool ===
Pos	Team	Pld	W	L	Pts	SW	SL	SR	SPW	SPL	SPR
1	Romania	5	5	0	10	15	0	MAX	227	116	1.957
2	Yugoslavia	5	4	1	9	12	6	2.000	242	214	1.131
3	Italy	5	2	3	7	9	10	0.900	219	216	1.014
4	West Germany	5	2	3	7	7	11	0.636	198	230	0.861
5	Netherlands	5	2	3	7	7	12	0.583	227	248	0.915
6	Belgium	5	0	5	5	4	15	0.267	183	272	0.673

Date		Score		Set 1	Set 2	Set 3	Set 4	Set 5	Total	Report
21 Oct	Yugoslavia	3–1	West Germany	15–11	10–15	15–10	15–7		55–43	Report
21 Oct	Romania	3–0	Netherlands	15–10	15–13	15–12			45–35	Report
21 Oct	Italy	3–1	Belgium	15–5	15–8	8–15	15–7		53–35	Report
22 Oct	Yugoslavia	3–0	Belgium	15–13	15–9	15–10			45–32	Report
22 Oct	Romania	3–0	West Germany	15–4	15–6	15–11			45–21	Report
22 Oct	Netherlands	3–1	Italy	16–14	4–15	15–5	15–10		50–44	Report
23 Oct	Yugoslavia	3–2	Italy	15–7	12–15	7–15	15–13	15–9	64–59	Report
23 Oct	West Germany	3–1	Netherlands	15–10	10–15	15–7	15–5		55–37	Report
23 Oct	Romania	3–0	Belgium	15–2	15–4	15–4			45–10	Report
24 Oct	Yugoslavia	3–0	Netherlands	16–14	15–10	15–9			46–33	Report
24 Oct	West Germany	3–1	Belgium	15–12	9–15	18–16	15–5		57–48	Report
24 Oct	Romania	3–0	Italy	15–4	15–7	15–7			45–18	Report
25 Oct	Yugoslavia	0–3	Romania	8–15	9–15	15–17			32–47	Report
25 Oct	Netherlands	3–2	Belgium	14–16	9–15	15–0	15–10	19–17	72–58	Report
25 Oct	Italy	3–0	West Germany	15–12	15–4	15–6			45–22	Report

=== Final pool ===
Pos	Team	Pld	W	L	Pts	SW	SL	SR	SPW	SPL	SPR
1	Soviet Union	5	5	0	10	15	2	7.500	244	120	2.033
2	Hungary	5	4	1	9	12	7	1.714	237	217	1.092
3	East Germany	5	2	3	7	8	11	0.727	225	221	1.018
4	Bulgaria	5	2	3	7	8	11	0.727	211	243	0.868
5	Czechoslovakia	5	2	3	7	8	11	0.727	201	241	0.834
6	Poland	5	0	5	5	6	15	0.400	211	287	0.735

Date		Score		Set 1	Set 2	Set 3	Set 4	Set 5	Total	Report
21 Oct	Hungary	3–1	East Germany	15–7	9–15	15–8	15–13		54–43	Report
21 Oct	Soviet Union	3–1	Bulgaria	15–4	7–15	15–12	15–2		52–33	Report
21 Oct	Czechoslovakia	3–2	Poland	15–8	11–15	8–15	15–13		64–58	Report
22 Oct	Hungary	3–1	Czechoslovakia	15–13	15–10	6–15	15–5		51–43	Report
22 Oct	Bulgaria	3–1	Poland	15–9	12–15	15–9	15–4		57–37	Report
22 Oct	Soviet Union	3–0	East Germany	15–8	15–8	15–5			45–21	Report
23 Oct	Soviet Union	3–0	Hungary	15–2	15–8	15–8			45–18	Report
23 Oct	Czechoslovakia	3–0	Bulgaria	15–9	15–11	15–10			45–30	Report
23 Oct	East Germany	3–2	Poland	15–6	11–15	15–2	9–15	15–12	65–50	Report
24 Oct	Hungary	3–1	Poland	15–10	9–15	17–15	15–6		56–46	Report
24 Oct	Soviet Union	3–1	Czechoslovakia	12–15	15–4	15–4	15–5		57–28	Report
24 Oct	Bulgaria	3–1	East Germany	15–12	6–15	15–12	15–12		51–51	Report
25 Oct	East Germany	3–0	Czechoslovakia	15–10	15–9	15–2			45–21	Report
25 Oct	Soviet Union	3–0	Poland	15–9	15–4	15–7			45–20	Report
25 Oct	Hungary	3–1	Bulgaria	13–15	15–7	15–5	15–13		58–40	Report

== Final ranking ==
Place	Team
1st place, gold medalist(s)	Soviet Union
2nd place, silver medalist(s)	Hungary
3rd place, bronze medalist(s)	East Germany
4.	Bulgaria
5.	Czechoslovakia
6.	Poland
7.	Romania
8.	Yugoslavia
9.	Italy
10.	West Germany
11.	Netherlands
12.	Belgium

Qualified for the 1976 Olympic Games as reigning champions
Qualified for the 1976 Olympic Games

1975 Women's European champions

Soviet Union
Eighth title

Team Roster
Nina Smoleyeva, Tatyana Sarycheva, Larisa Bergen, Anna Rostova, Lyudmila Shchetinina, Lyudmila Chernyshyova, Yevgeniya Nazarenko, Liliya Osadchaya, Natalya Kushnir, Olga Kozakova, Nadezhda Radzevich and Lidiya Loginova.
Head coach: Givi Akhvlediani.
