= Lyudmila Chernyshyova =

Soviet volleyball player (born 1952)

Lyudmila Chernyshova

Personal information
- Full name: Lyudmila Georgiyevna Chernyshova (Prokoshina)
- Born: 1 November 1952 (age 73); Moscow, Russian SFSR, Soviet Union
- Height: 1.72 m (5 ft 7 1/2 in)

Volleyball information
- Position: Outside hitter
- Number: 10
Honours
Women's volleyball
Representing Soviet Union
Olympic Games
Gold medal – first place	1980 Moscow	Team
Silver medal – second place	1976 Montreal	Team
World Championship
Silver medal – second place	1974 Mexico
Bronze medal – third place	1978 Soviet Union
World Cup
Gold medal – first place	1973 Uruguay
Bronze medal – third place	1981 Japan
European Championship
Gold medal – first place	1975 Yugoslavia
Gold medal – first place	1977 Finland
Gold medal – first place	1979 France
Silver medal – second place	1981 Bulgaria
Summer Universiade
Gold medal – first place	1973 Moscow

Lyudmila Chernyshova (born 1 November 1952) is a Russian former volleyball player who competed for the now defunct Soviet Union. Born in Moscow, she competed for the Soviet national team at the 1976 and 1980 Summer Olympics. She won a gold medal in the 1980 Olympics in Moscow.
