= Nina Smoleyeva =

Soviet volleyball player

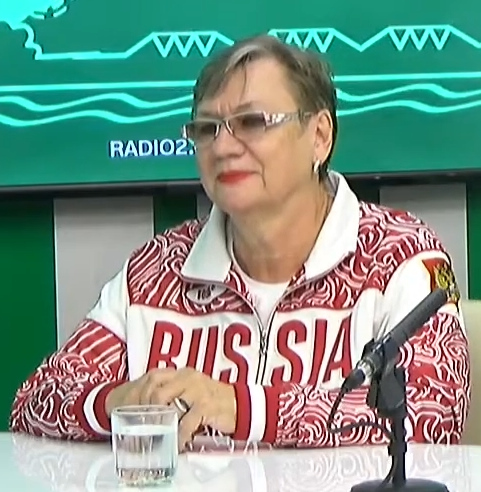
- Smoleyeva in 2018

Personal information
- Full name: Nina Nikolayevna Smoleyeva (Nikitina)
- Born: 28 March 1948 (age 78); Volkhov, Leningrad Oblast, Russian SFSR, Soviet Union
- Height: 1.75 m (5 ft 9 in)
Honours
Women's volleyball
Representing Soviet Union
Olympic Games
Gold medal – first place	1968 Mexico City	Team
Gold medal – first place	1972 Munich	Team
Silver medal – second place	1976 Montreal	Team
World Championship
Gold medal – first place	1970 Bulgaria	Team
Bronze medal – third place	1978 Soviet Union	Team
World Cup
Gold medal – first place	1973 Uruguay	Team
European Championship
Gold medal – first place	1967 Turkey	Team
Gold medal – first place	1971 Italy	Team
Gold medal – first place	1975 Yugoslavia	Team
Gold medal – first place	1977 Finland	Team
Summer Universiade
Gold medal – first place	1973 Moscow	Team

Nina Smoleyeva (born 28 March 1948) is a former volleyball player for the USSR. Smoloyeva was a major player who helped the Soviet Union women's national volleyball team to become the most dominant team in the late 1960s to early 1970s, by winning the 1968 Olympics, the 1970 FIVB World Championship, the 1972 Olympics, and the 1973 FIVB World Cup in row. She also helped the Soviet Union to European Championship titles in 1967, 1971, 1975, and 1977.

In 2006, Smoleyeva was inducted into the International Volleyball Hall of Fame.
