= Larisa Bergen =

Soviet volleyball player (1949–2023)

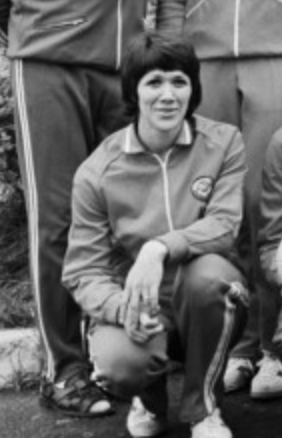
- Bergen in 1976

Personal information
- Full name: Larisa Abramovna Bergen (Goncharova)
- Born: 22 September 1949; Akmolinsk, Kazakh SSR, Soviet Union
- Died: 7 April 2023 (aged 73)
- Height: 1.71 m (5 ft 7 in)
- Weight: 148 lb (67 kg)
Medal record
Women's volleyball
Representing Soviet Union
Olympic Games
Silver medal – second place	1976 Montreal	Team
FIVB World Cup
Gold medal – first place	1973 Uruguay	Team

Larisa Abramovna Bergen (Russian: Лариса Абрамовна Берген; 22 September 1949 – 7 April 2023) was a volleyball player for the USSR. She was Jewish, and was born in Akmolinsk, Kazakh SSR. Bergen played for ADK Alma-Ata and Dynamo Moscow. She won a silver medal in volleyball at the 1976 Olympics, in Montreal, Canada.

Bergen died on 7 April 2023, at the age of 73.

== See also ==
- List of select Jewish volleyball players
