= Nina Muradyan =

Soviet Armenian volleyball player (born 1954)

Personal information
- Full name: Nina Olegovna Muradyan (-Sawatzki)
- Nationality: Soviet (former); Armenian
- Born: 17 August 1954 (age 72); Yerevan, Armenian SSR, Soviet Union
- Height: 1.71 m (5 ft 7 in)
- Weight: 146 lb (66 kg)

Volleyball information
- Position: Setter
- Number: 12
Honours
Women's volleyball
Representing the Soviet Union
Olympic Games
Silver medal – second place	1976 Montreal	Team
World Championship
Bronze medal – third place	1978 Soviet Union	Team

Nina Muradyan (Armenian: Նինա Մուրադյան, born 17 August 1954) is an Armenian former volleyball player who represented the Soviet Union.
