= Lyudmila Shchetinina =

Soviet volleyball player (born 1951)

Personal information
- Born: 1 January 1951 (age 75); Gusev, Kaliningrad, Soviet Union
- Height: 1.78 m (5 ft 10 in)

Volleyball information
- Position: Outside hitter

National team
1971–1978	Soviet Union
Honours
Women's volleyball
Representing the Soviet Union
Olympic Games
Silver medal – second place	1976 Montreal	Team
World Championship
Silver medal – second place	1974 Mexico	Team
Bronze medal – third place	1978 Soviet Union	Team
FIVB World Cup
Gold medal – first place	1973 Uruguay	Team

Lyudmila Ivanovna Shchetinina (Russian: Людмила Ивановна Щетинина; born 1 January 1951) is a Soviet former volleyball player. She won a silver medal at the 1976 Summer Olympics in Montreal, Canada.
