= Vladimir Ulanov =

Russian volleyball player (1951–2000)

Personal information
- Full name: Vladimir Viktorovich Ulanov
- Nickname: Владимир Викторович Уланов
- Born: 10 February 1951 Russian SFSR, Soviet Union
- Died: 10 September 1999 (aged 48) Russia

Volleyball information
- Position: Setter
- Number: 11

National team
- Years: Team
- 1973–1977: Soviet Union
Honours
Men's volleyball
Representing Soviet Union
Olympic Games
Silver medal – second place	1976 Montreal	Team
World Championship
Silver medal – second place	1974 Mexico	Team
FIVB World Cup
Gold medal – first place	1977 Japan	Team

Vladimir Viktorovich Ulanov (Russian: Владимир Викторович Уланов, 10 February 1951 – 10 September 1999) was a Russian former volleyball player who competed for the Soviet Union in the 1976 Summer Olympics in Montreal. In 1976, Ulanov was part of the Soviet team that won the silver medal in the Olympic tournament. He played all five matches.
