= Volleyball at the 1976 Summer Olympics =

Volleyball at the Games of the XXI Olympiad
- Venue: Montreal Forum and Paul Sauvé Arena
- Dates: 18–30 July 1976
- No. of events: 2
- Competitors: 216 from 13 nations

Volleyball at the 1976 Summer Olympics was represented by two events: men's team and women's team.

== Medal table ==
Rank	Nation	Gold	Silver	Bronze	Total
1	Japan	1	0	0	1
1	Poland	1	0	0	1
3	Soviet Union	0	2	0	2
4	Cuba	0	0	1	1
4	South Korea	0	0	1	1
Totals (5 entries)		2	2	2	6

== Medal summary ==
Event	Gold	Silver	Bronze
Men's indoor	Poland; Bronisław Bebel; Ryszard Bosek; Wiesław Gawłowski; Marek Karbarz; Lech Łasko; Zbigniew Lubiejewski; Mirosław Rybaczewski; Włodzimierz Sadalski; Edward Skorek; Włodzimierz Stefański; Tomasz Wójtowicz; Zbigniew Zarzycki	Soviet Union; Vladimir Chernyshov; Yefim Chulak; Vladimir Dorokhov; Aleksandr Ermilov; Vladimir Kondra; Oleg Moliboga; Anatoliy Polishchuk; Aleksandr Savin; Pāvels Seļivanovs; Yuri Starunsky; Vladimir Ulanov; Vyacheslav Zaytsev	Cuba; Alfredo Figueredo; Víctor García; Diego Lapera; Leonel Marshall Steward, Sr. Ernesto Martínez; Lorenzo Martínez; Jorge Pérez; Antonio Rodríguez; Carlos Salas; Victoriano Sarmientos; Jesús Savigne; Raúl Vilches
Women's indoor	Japan; Yuko Arakida; Takako Iida; Katsuko Kanesaka; Kiyomi Kato; Echiko Maeda; Noriko Matsuda; Mariko Okamoto; Takako Shirai; Shoko Takayanagi; Hiromi Yano; Juri Yokoyama; Mariko Yoshida	Soviet Union; Larisa Bergen; Liudmila Chernyshova; Olga Kozakova; Natalya Kushnir; Nina Muradyan; Liliya Osadchaya; Anna Rostova; Lyubov Rudovskaya; Inna Ryskal; Lyudmila Shchetinina; Nina Smoleeva; Zoya Yusova	South Korea; Baik Myung-sun; Byon Kyung-ja; Chang Hee-sook; Jo Hea-jung; Jung Soon-ok; Lee Soon-bok; Lee Soon-ok; Ma Kum-ja; Park Mi-kum; Yoon Young-nae; Yu Jung-hye; Yu Kyung-hwa
