= Lyubov Rudovskaya =

Soviet volleyball player (born 1950)

Personal information
- Full name: Lyubov Ivanovna Rudovskaya (Timofeyeva-)
- Born: 5 November 1950 (age 75); Odessa, Soviet Union
- Height: 1.74 m (5 ft 9 in)

National team
Soviet Union
Honours
Women's volleyball
Representing the Soviet Union
Olympic Games
Silver medal – second place	1976 Montreal	Team

Lyubov Ivanovna Rudovskaya also spelt Rudovska (Ukrainian: Любов Іванівна Рудовська; born 5 November 1950) is a Ukrainian former volleyball player who represented the Soviet Union. She won a silver medal at the 1976 Summer Olympics.
