= Anatoliy Polishchuk =

Ukrainian volleyball player (1950–2016)

Personal information
- Full name: Anatoliy Antonovich Polishchuk
- Born: Анатолій Антонович Поліщук; 11 January 1950; Velyki Mezhyrichi, Rivne Oblast, Ukrainian SSR, Soviet Union
- Died: 7 June 2016 (aged 66)
- Height: 196 cm (6 ft 5 in)

National team
1974–1978	Soviet Union
Honours
Men's volleyball
Representing Soviet Union
Olympic Games
Silver medal – second place	1976 Montreal	Team
World Championship
Gold medal – first place	1978 Italy	Team
Silver medal – second place	1974 Mexico	Team
FIVB World Cup
Gold medal – first place	1977 Japan	Team

Anatoliy Antonovich Polishchuk (Ukrainian: Анатолій Антонович Поліщук; 11 January 1950 – 7 June 2016) was a Ukrainian volleyball player who competed for the Soviet Union in the 1976 Summer Olympics in Montreal.

In 1976, he was part of the Soviet team which won the silver medal in the Olympic tournament. He played all five matches.
