= Yuri Starunsky =

Soviet volleyball player (1945–2010)

Personal information
- Full name: Yury Vasilevich Starunsky
- Nickname: Юрий Васильевич Старунский
- Nationality: Soviet
- Born: July 11, 1945 Kiev, Ukrainian SSR, Soviet Union
- Died: December 24, 2010 (aged 65) Russia
Honours
Men's volleyball
Representing Soviet Union
Olympic Games
Silver medal – second place	1976 Montreal	Team
Bronze medal – third place	1972 Munich	Team

Yury Vasilevich Starunsky (Russian: Юрий Васильевич Старунский, April 17, 1945 – December 24, 2010) was a Soviet volleyball player who competed for the Soviet Union in the 1972 Summer Olympics in Munich and the 1976 Summer Olympics in Montreal.

In 1972, Starunsky was part of the Soviet team that won the bronze medal in the Olympic tournament. He played all seven matches.

Four years later, Starunsky won the silver medal with the Soviet team in the 1976 Olympic tournament. He played all five matches.
