= Oleg Moliboga =

Russian volleyball player and coach (1953–2022)

Personal information
- Full name: Oleg Alekseyevich Moliboga
- Nickname: Олег Алексеевич Молибога
- Nationality: Russian
- Born: 27 February 1953; Dnipropetrovsk, Ukrainian SSR, Soviet Union
- Died: 9 June 2022 (aged 69)
- Height: 1.93 m (6 ft 4 in)

Volleyball information
- Number: 7

National team
1976–1983	Soviet Union
Medal record
Men's volleyball
Representing Soviet Union
Olympic Games
Gold medal – first place	1980 Moscow	Team
Silver medal – second place	1976 Montreal	Team
World Championship
Gold medal – first place	1978 Italy
Gold medal – first place	1982 Argentina
World Cup
Gold medal – first place	1977 Japan
Gold medal – first place	1981 Japan
European Championship
Gold medal – first place	1977 Finland
Gold medal – first place	1979 France
Gold medal – first place	1981 Bulgaria
Gold medal – first place	1983 East Germany
European Junior Championship
Gold medal – first place	1973 Netherlands	Under-20

Oleg Alekseyevich Moliboga (Russian: Олег Алексеевич Молибога, Ukrainian: Олег Олексійович Молибога; 27 February 1953 – 9 June 2022) was a Soviet volleyball player and Russian volleyball coach. Born in Dnipropetrovsk, he participated in the 1976 Summer Olympics in Montreal and the 1980 Summer Olympics in Moscow.

In 1976, Moliboga was part of the Soviet team that won the silver medal in the Olympic tournament. He played all five matches. Four years later, in 1980, he won the gold medal with the Soviet team in the 1980 Olympic tournament. He played all six matches.

Moliboga was one of the preeminent players of the 1970s and the early 1980s, training at the Armed Forces sports society in Dnipropetrovsk. With the USSR national team, he won also two World Championships in 1978 and 1982.
