= Victoriano Sarmientos =

Cuban volleyball player (born 1956)

Victoriano Sarmientos Bios
Personal information
- Full name: Victoriano Sarmientos Bios
- Born: 18 December 1956 (age 69) Camagüey, Cuba
- Height: 1.86 m (6 ft 1 in)

Volleyball information
- Number: 2

National team
- Years: Team
- 1976–1977: Cuba
Honours
Men's volleyball
Representing Cuba
Olympic Games
Bronze medal – third place	1976 Montreal	Team
FIVB World Cup
Bronze medal – third place	1977 Japan

Victoriano Sarmientos (born 18 December 1956) is a Cuban former volleyball player who competed at the 1976 Summer Olympics in Montreal, where he won a bronze medal. He played all six matches.

== Personal life ==
Sarmientos' younger brother, Abel, also played on the Cuban national team.
