= Im Ho-dam =

South Korean volleyball player (born 1954)

Personal information
- Nationality: South Korean
- Born: 25 May 1954 (age 70)

Sport
- Sport: Volleyball

Im Ho-dam (born 25 May 1954) is a South Korean volleyball player. He competed in the men's tournament at the 1976 Summer Olympics.
