= Yefim Chulak =

Russian volleyball player (born 1948)

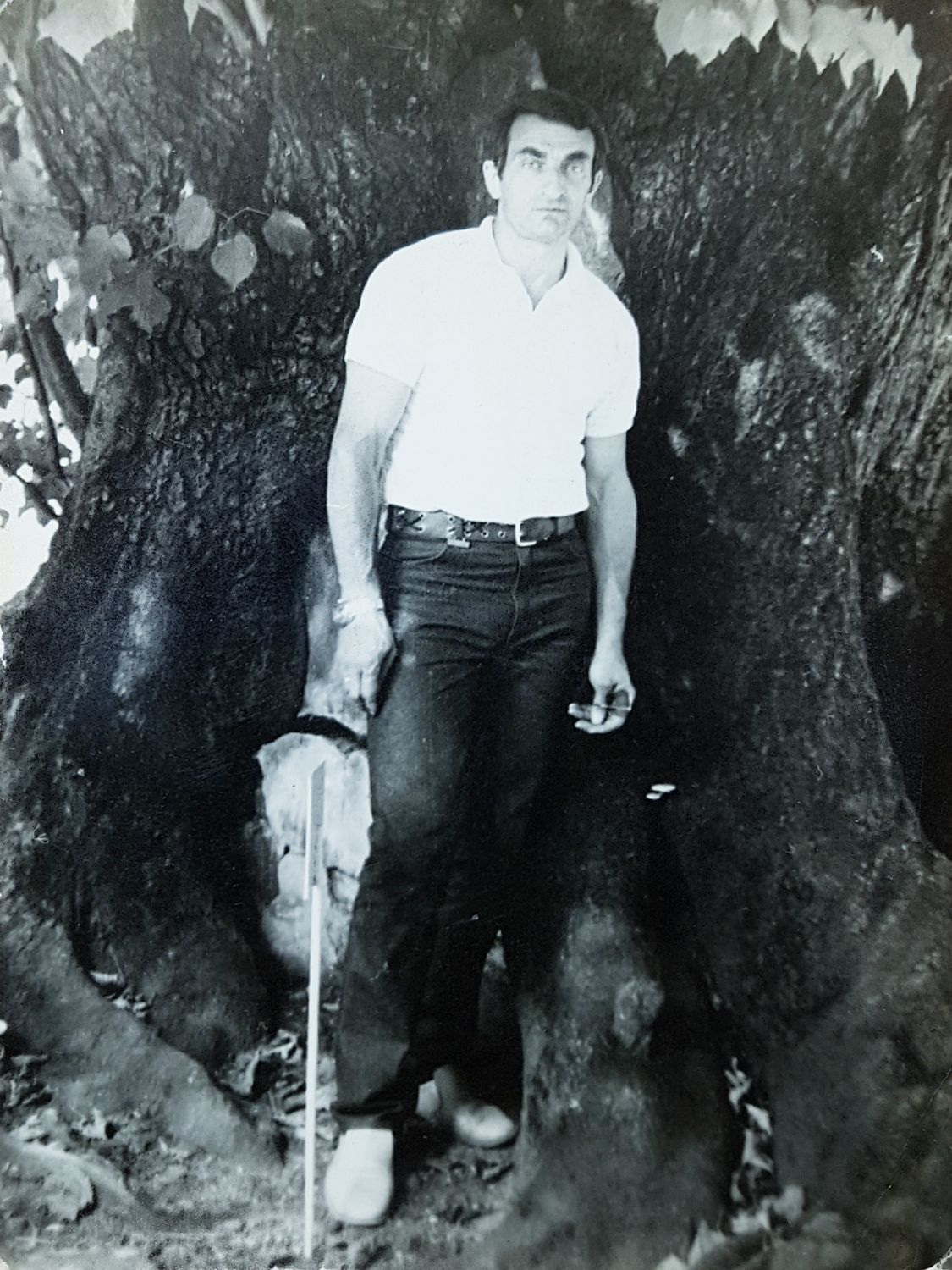
- Yefim Chulak

Personal information
- Full name: Yefim Aronovich Chulak
- Nickname: Ефим Аронович Чулак
- Nationality: Russian
- Born: 15 July 1948 (age 78) Ceadîr-Lunga, Moldavian SSR, Soviet Union

Volleyball information

National team
- Years: Team
- –: Soviet Union
Honours
Men's volleyball
Representing Soviet Union
Olympic Games
Silver medal – second place	1976 Montreal	Team
Bronze medal – third place	1972 Munich	Team

Yefim Aronovich Chulak (Russian: Ефим Аронович Чулак, born 15 July 1948) is a Russian former volleyball player who competed for the Soviet Union in the 1972 Summer Olympics in Munich and the 1976 Summer Olympics in Montreal. He is Jewish.

In 1972, Chulak was part of the Soviet team that won the bronze medal in the Olympic tournament. He played all seven matches.

Four years later, Chulak won the silver medal with the Soviet team in the 1976 Olympic tournament. He played all five matches.

== See also ==
- List of select Jewish volleyball players
