= Zoya Yusova =

Soviet volleyball player (born 1948)

Personal information
- Full name: Zoya Fyodorovna Yusova (Kosacheva-)
- Nationality: Russian
- Born: 1 April 1948 (age 78) Krasnodar, Krasnodar Kray, Russia, Soviet Union
- Height: 1.71 m (5 ft 7 in)

Volleyball information
- Number: 11

National team
- Years: Team
- –: Soviet Union
Honours
Women's volleyball
Representing the Soviet Union
Olympic Games
Silver medal – second place	1976 Montreal	Team

Zoya Fyodorovna Yusova (Russian: Зо́я Фёдоровна Ю́сова; born 1 April 1948) is a Russian former volleyball player. She won a silver medal at the 1976 Summer Olympics.
