= Chang Hee-sook =

South Korean volleyball player (born 1955)

Jang Hye-sook

Personal information
- Born: March 5, 1955 (age 71)
Honours
Women's volleyball
Representing South Korea
Bronze medal – third place	1976 Montreal	Team

- Chang Hee-sook
- Hangul: 장혜숙
- Hanja: 張惠淑
- RR: Jang Hyesuk
- MR: Chang Hyesuk

Chang Hee-sook (born 5 March 1955) is a Korean former volleyball player who competed in the 1976 Summer Olympics.
