= Yoon Young-nae =

South Korean volleyball player (born 1952)

Olympic medal record

Women's volleyball

Representing South Korea
Bronze medal – third place	1976 Montreal	Team competition

- Yoon Young-nae
- Hangul: 윤영내
- RR: Yun Yeongnae
- MR: Yun Yŏngnae

Yoon Young-nae (Korean: 윤영내; born 26 September 1952) is a Korean former volleyball player who competed in the 1972 Summer Olympics and in the 1976 Summer Olympics.
