= Natalia Kushnir =

Soviet volleyball player (born 1954)

Personal information
- Full name: Nataliya Grigoryevna Kushnir (-Puchkova)
- Nickname: Наталья Григорьевна Кушнир
- Nationality: Russian
- Born: 6 May 1954 (age 72); Moscow, Russia
- Height: 1.78 m (5 ft 10 in)

National team
Soviet Union
Honours
Women's volleyball
Representing the Soviet Union
Olympic Games
Silver medal – second place	1976 Montreal	Team

Natalia Grigoryevna Kushnir (Russian: Наталья Григорьевна Кушнир; born 6 May 1954) is a Russian former volleyball player and Olympic silver medalist.

Kushnir, who is Jewish, was born in Moscow, Russia. She played volleyball for Lokomotiv Moskva, and for the Soviet Union.

Kushnir and the Soviet Union team won the team gold medal in volleyball at the 1971 European Championships. She and the Soviet team won a silver medal at the 1976 Olympics in Montreal, losing to Japan in the finals.

== See also ==
- List of Jewish volleyball players
