= Lee Soon-ok (volleyball) =

South Korean volleyball player (born 1955)

Olympic medal record

Women's volleyball

Representing South Korea
Bronze medal – third place	1976 Montreal	Team competition

- Lee Soon-ok
- Hangul: 이순옥
- Hanja: 李順玉
- RR: I Sunok
- MR: I Sunok

Lee Soon-ok (born 28 September 1955) is a South Korean former volleyball player who competed in the 1976 Summer Olympics.
