= Yu Kyung-hwa =

South Korean volleyball player (born 1953)

Olympic medal record

Women's volleyball

Representing South Korea
Bronze medal – third place	1976 Montreal	Team competition

- Yu Kyung-hwa
- Hangul: 유경화
- RR: Yu Gyeonghwa
- MR: Yu Kyŏnghwa

Yu Kyung-hwa (Korean: 유경화; born 22 December 1953) is a Korean former volleyball player who competed in the 1972 Summer Olympics and in the 1976 Summer Olympics.
