= Lee Soon-bok =

South Korean volleyball player (born 1950)

Personal information
- Born: March 26, 1950 (age 76); South Korea
Honours
Women's volleyball
Representing South Korea
Olympic Games
| Bronze medal – third place | 1976 Montreal | Team competition |

- Lee Soon-bok
- Hangul: 이순복
- Hanja: 李順福
- RR: I Sunbok
- MR: I Sunbok

Lee Soon-bok (born 26 March 1950) is a Korean former volleyball player who competed in the 1972 Summer Olympics and in the 1976 Summer Olympics.
