= Baik Myung-sun =

South Korean volleyball player (born 1956)

Personal information
- Nationality: South Korean
- Born: February 12, 1956 (age 70); Gwangju, South Korea
- Height: 1.73 m (5 ft 8 in)
- Weight: 64 kg (141 lb)

Volleyball information
- Position: Hitter

Career
Years	Teams
1972–1974 1975–1977; 1977–1981; 1981–1984	Chosun University Girls'; High School; Monopoly Bureau; Lotte; Fujifilm

National team
1974–1978	South Korea
Honours
Women's volleyball
Representing South Korea
Olympic Games
Bronze medal – third place	1976 Montreal	Team
Asian Games
Bronze medal – third place	1978 Bangkok	Team

- Baik Myung-sun
- Hangul: 백명선
- Hanja: 白明善
- RR: Baek Myeongseon
- MR: Paek Myŏngsŏn

Baik Myung-sun (born 12 February 1956) is a South Korean former volleyball player who competed in the 1976 Summer Olympics and won a bronze medal.
