= Jung Soon-ok (volleyball) =

South Korean volleyball player (born 1955)

Jeong Sun-ok

Personal information
- Born: February 16, 1955 (age 71)
Medal record
Women's volleyball
Representing South Korea
Olympic Games
Bronze medal – third place	1976 Montreal	Team competition

- Jung Soon-ok
- Hangul: 정순옥
- RR: Jeong Sunok
- MR: Chŏng Sunok

Jeong Sun-ok (born 16 February 1955) is a South Korean former volleyball player who competed in the 1976 Summer Olympics.
