= Ma Kum-ja =

South Korean volleyball player (born 1955)

Ma Kum-Ja

Personal information
- Full name: Ma Geum-Ja
- Nickname: 마 금자
- Born: August 24, 1955 (age 71); Seoul, South Korea
Medal record
Women's volleyball
Representing South Korea
Olympic Games
Bronze medal – third place	1976 Montreal	Team competition

Ma Kum-Ja (born 24 August 1955) is a Korean former volleyball player who competed in the 1976 Summer Olympics.
