= Yu Jung-hye =

South Korean volleyball player (born 1954)

Olympic medal record

Women's volleyball

Representing South Korea
Bronze medal – third place	1976 Montreal	Team competition

- Yu Jung-hye
- Hangul: 유정혜
- RR: Yu Jeonghye
- MR: Yu Chŏnghye

Yu Jung-hye (Korean: 유정혜; born 10 February 1954) is a Korean former volleyball player who competed in the 1972 Summer Olympics and in the 1976 Summer Olympics.
