= Jo Hea-jung =

South Korean volleyball player (1953–2024)

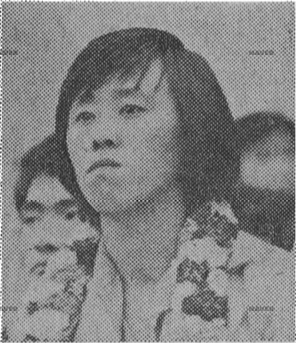

Personal information
- Born: March 5, 1953
- Died: October 30, 2024 (aged 71)

Korean name
- Hangul: 조혜정
- RR: Jo Hyejeong
- MR: Cho Hyejŏng
Medal record
Women's volleyball
Representing South Korea
Olympic Games
Bronze medal – third place	1976 Montreal	Team competition

Jo Hea-jung (Korean: 조혜정; March 5, 1953 – October 30, 2024) was a South Korean volleyball player, who was a member of the South Korea Women's National Team that won the bronze medal at the 1976 Summer Olympics. Jo died on October 30, 2024, at the age of 71.

== Clubs ==
- (South Korea) Midopa (1973–1977)
- (Italy) Lions Baby Ancona (1979–1981)

== Awards ==
- 1973 FIVB World Cup – Most Valuable Player
