= Olga Kozakova =

Soviet volleyball player (born 1951)

Personal information
- Full name: Olga Igorevna Kozakova
- Born: 14 March 1951 (age 75); Odessa, Ukrainian SSR, Soviet Union
- Height: 1.73 m (5 ft 8 in)

National team
Soviet Union
Honours
Women's volleyball
Representing the Soviet Union
Olympic Games
Silver medal – second place	1976 Montreal	Team

Olga Ihorivna Kozakova also spelt Olha (Ukrainian: Ольга Ігорівна Козакова; born 14 March 1951) is a Ukrainian former volleyball player who represented the Soviet Union. She won a silver medal at the 1976 Summer Olympics.
