= Park Mi-kum =

South Korean volleyball player (born 1955)

Olympic medal record

Women's volleyball

Representing South Korea
Bronze medal – third place	1976 Montreal	Team competition

- Park Mi-kum
- Hangul: 박미금
- RR: Bak Migeum
- MR: Pak Migŭm

Park Mi-kum (Korean: 박미금; born 6 October 1955) is a Korean former volleyball player who competed in the 1976 Summer Olympics.
