= Liliya Osadchaya =

Soviet volleyball player (born 1953)

Personal information
- Full name: Liliya Semyonovna Osadchaya
- Born: 5 February 1953 (age 73); Cherkasy, Ukrainian SSR, Soviet Union
- Height: 1.77 m (5 ft 10 in)

Volleyball information
- Position: Outside hitter

National team
1974-1978	Soviet Union
Honours
Women's volleyball
Representing the Soviet Union
Olympic Games
Silver medal – second place	1976 Montreal	Team
World Championship
Silver medal – second place	1974 Mexico	Team
Bronze medal – third place	1978 Soviet Union	Team
European Junior Championships
Gold medal – first place	1971 Italy

Liliya Semenivna Osadchaya (Ukrainian: Лілія Семенівна Осадча, also spelled Osadcha, born 5 February 1953) is a Ukrainian former volleyball player. She won a silver medal at the 1976 Summer Olympics, competing for the Soviet team.
