= Anna Rostova =

Soviet volleyball player (born 1950)

Personal information
- Full name: Anna Nikolayevna Rostova (-Mazur)
- Born: 17 December 1950 (age 75); Bohdanivka, Kirovohrad, Ukrainian SSR, Soviet Union
- Height: 1.80 m (5 ft 11 in)

National team
Soviet Union
Honours
Women's volleyball
Representing the Soviet Union
Olympic Games
Silver medal – second place	1976 Montreal	Team

Anna Nikolayevna Rostova (Russian: Анна Николаевна Ростова; born 17 December 1950) is a Ukrainian former volleyball player who represented the Soviet Union. She won a silver medal at the 1976 Summer Olympics.
