= Byon Kyung-ja =

South Korean volleyball player (born 1956)

- Hangul: 변경자
- Hanja: 邊京子
- RR: Byeon Gyeongja
- MR: Pyŏn Kyŏngja

Byon Kyung-ja
Medal record

Women's volleyball

Representing South Korea

Olympic Games
Bronze medal – third place	1976 Montreal	Team competition

Byon Kyung-ja (born 6 January 1956) is a Korean former volleyball player who competed in the 1976 Summer Olympics.
