= 1973 FIVB Volleyball Women's World Cup =

Women's volleyball tournament

1973 Women's World Cup
Tournament details
- Host country: Uruguay
- Dates: 19–28 October
- Teams: 10
- Venue: (in 3 host cities)

Final positions
- Champions: Soviet Union (1st title)

Tournament awards
- MVP: (South Korea) Jo Hea-jung

The 1973 FIVB Women's World Cup was held on 19–28 October 1973 in Uruguay. It was the first edition of the tournament and is the only edition of the tournament to have been hosted by a country other than Japan.

== Results ==
=== First round ===
==== Pool A ====
Pos	Team	Pld	W	L	Pts	SW	SL	SR	SPW	SPL	SPR	Qualification
1	Japan	4	4	0	8	12	0	MAX	0	0	—	Semifinals
2	Peru	4	3	1	7	9	4	2.250	0	0	—	Semifinals
3	Canada	4	2	2	6	7	6	1.167	0	0	—	5th–8th places
4	Argentina	4	1	3	5	3	9	0.333	0	0	—	5th–8th places
5	Uruguay	4	0	4	4	0	12	0.000	0	0	—	9th–10th places

Date		Score		Set 1	Set 2	Set 3	Set 4	Set 5	Total
19 Nov	Japan	3–0	Uruguay	15–0	15–1	15–1			45–2
19 Nov	Peru	3–1	Canada	13–15	15–4	15–8	16–14		59–41
20 Nov	Japan	3–0	Argentina	15–1	15–2	15–0			45–3
20 Nov	Canada	3–0	Uruguay	15–2	15–5	15–3			45–10
21 Nov	Canada	3–0	Argentina		15–7				
21 Nov	Peru	3–0	Uruguay						
22 Nov	Peru	3–0	Argentina	15–0	15–3	15–4			45–7
22 Nov	Japan	3–0	Canada						
23 Nov	Japan	3–0	Peru	15–8	15–6	15–3			45–17
23 Nov	Argentina	3–0	Uruguay	15–8	15–12	15–5			45–25

==== Pool B ====
Pos	Team	Pld	W	L	Pts	SW	SL	SR	SPW	SPL	SPR	Qualification
1	Soviet Union	4	4	0	8	12	0	MAX	0	0	—	Semifinals
2	South Korea	4	3	1	7	9	3	3.000	0	0	—	Semifinals
3	Cuba	4	2	2	6	6	7	0.857	0	0	—	5th–8th places
4	United States	4	1	3	5	3	9	0.333	0	0	—	5th–8th places
5	Brazil	4	0	4	4	0	12	0.000	0	0	—	9th–10th places

Date		Score		Set 1	Set 2	Set 3	Set 4	Set 5	Total
19 Nov	Soviet Union	3–0	United States	15–3	15–3	15–6			45–12
19 Nov	Cuba	3–0	Brazil	15–11	15–3	15–7			45–21
20 Nov	Soviet Union	3–0	Brazil	15–1	15–2	15–3			45–6
20 Nov	South Korea	3–0	United States	15–6	15–8	15–2			45–16
21 Nov	Soviet Union	3–0	Cuba						
21 Nov	South Korea	3–0	Brazil	15–6	15–1	15–5			45–12
22 Nov	South Korea	3–0	Cuba	15–7	15–3	15–6			45–16
22 Nov	United States	3–0	Brazil	15–12	15–0	15–9			45–21
23 Nov	Cuba	3–0	United States	17–15	15–2	16–14			48–31
23 Nov	Soviet Union	3–0	South Korea						

=== Final round ===
Semifinals
25 October – Montevideo
Japan	3
South Korea	2
26 October – Montevideo
Soviet Union	3
Peru	0

Final
28 October – Montevideo
Japan	0
Soviet Union	3
3rd place
27 October – Montevideo
South Korea	3
Peru	0

5th–8th semifinals
26 October – Montevideo
Cuba	3
Argentina	1
26 October – Montevideo
Canada	1
United States	3

5th place
27 October – Montevideo
Cuba	3
United States	1
7th place
28 October – Montevideo
Argentina	0
Canada	3

==== Semifinals ====
Date	Time		Score		Set 1	Set 2	Set 3	Set 4	Set 5	Total
25 Oct	20:00	Japan	3–2	South Korea	15–9	8–15	15–7	11–15	15–9	64–55
26 Oct	22:00	Soviet Union	3–0	Peru	15–6	15–11	15–10			45–27

==== 5th–8th semifinals ====
Date	Time		Score		Set 1	Set 2	Set 3	Set 4	Set 5	Total
26 Oct	15:00	Cuba	3–1	Argentina						
26 Oct	20:00	Canada	1–3	United States						

==== 9th place match ====
Date	Time		Score		Set 1	Set 2	Set 3	Set 4	Set 5	Total
27 Oct	15:00	Uruguay	1–3	Brazil	5–15	5–15	16–14	2–15		28–59

==== 7th place match ====
Date	Time		Score		Set 1	Set 2	Set 3	Set 4	Set 5	Total
28 Oct	20:00	Argentina	0–3	Canada	7–15	7–15	10–15			24–45

==== 5th place match ====
Date	Time		Score		Set 1	Set 2	Set 3	Set 4	Set 5	Total
27 Oct	20:00	Cuba	3–1	United States	16–18	15–1	15–8	15–6		61–33

==== 3rd place match ====
Date	Time		Score		Set 1	Set 2	Set 3	Set 4	Set 5	Total
27 Oct	22:00	South Korea	3–0	Peru	15–12	15–13	15–3			45–28

==== Final ====
Date	Time		Score		Set 1	Set 2	Set 3	Set 4	Set 5	Total
28 Oct	22:00	Japan	0–3	Soviet Union	5–15	9–15	11–15			25–45

== Final standing ==
Rank	Team
1st place, gold medalist(s)	Soviet Union
2nd place, silver medalist(s)	Japan
3rd place, bronze medalist(s)	South Korea
4	Peru
5	Cuba
6	United States
7	Canada
8	Argentina
9	Brazil
10	Uruguay

1973 Women's World Cup champions

Soviet Union
1st title
