= Japan at the 1976 Summer Olympics =

- IOC code: JPN
- NOC: Japanese Olympic Committee

in Montreal
- Competitors: 213 (153 men and 60 women) in 20 sports
- Flag bearer: Katsutoshi Nekoda
- Medals Ranked 5th: Gold 9 Silver 6 Bronze 10 Total 25

Summer Olympics appearances (overview)
- 1912; 1920; 1924; 1928; 1932; 1936; 1948; 1952; 1956; 1960; 1964; 1968; 1972; 1976; 1980; 1984; 1988; 1992; 1996; 2000; 2004; 2008; 2012; 2016; 2020; 2024

Japan competed at the 1976 Summer Olympics in Montreal, Quebec, Canada. 213 competitors, 153 men and 60 women, took part in 119 events in 20 sports.

== Medalists ==
Medal	Name	Sport	Event	Date
Gold	Shun Fujimoto; Hisato Igarashi; Sawao Kato; Hiroshi Kajiyama; Mitsuo Tsukahara; Eizo Kenmotsu	Gymnastics	Men's team all-around	July 20
Gold	Mitsuo Tsukahara	Gymnastics	Men's horizontal bar	July 23
Gold	Sawao Kato	Gymnastics	Men's parallel bars	July 23
Gold	Kazuhiro Ninomiya	Judo	Men's 93 kg	July 27
Gold	Isamu Sonoda	Judo	Men's 80 kg	July 28
Gold	Yuko Arakida; Takako Iida; Katsuko Kanesaka; Kiyomi Kato; Echiko Maeda; Noriko Matsuda; Mariko Okamoto; Takako Shirai; Shoko Takayanagi; Hiromi Yano; Juri Yokoyama; Mariko Yoshida	Volleyball	Women's tournament	July 30
Gold	Yuji Takada	Wrestling	Men's freestyle 52 kg	July 31
Gold	Jiichiro Date	Wrestling	Men's freestyle 74 kg	July 31
Gold	Haruki Uemura	Judo	Men's open category	July 31
Silver	Sawao Kato	Gymnastics	Men's individual all-around	July 21
Silver	Eizo Kenmotsu	Gymnastics	Men's horizontal bar	July 23
Silver	Eizo Kenmotsu	Gymnastics	Men's pommel horse	July 23
Silver	Mitsuo Tsukahara	Gymnastics	Men's vault	July 23
Silver	Koji Kuramoto	Judo	Men's 70 kg	July 29
Silver	Hiroshi Michinaga	Archery	Men's individual	July 30
Bronze	Kenkichi Ando	Weightlifting	Men's 56 kg	July 19
Bronze	Kazumasa Hirai	Weightlifting	Men's 60 kg	July 20
Bronze	Mitsuo Tsukahara	Gymnastics	Men's individual all-around	July 21
Bronze	Mitsuo Tsukahara	Gymnastics	Men's parallel bars	July 23
Bronze	Hiroshi Kajiyama	Gymnastics	Men's vault	July 23
Bronze	Koichiro Hirayama	Wrestling	Men's Greco-Roman 52 kg	July 24
Bronze	Sumio Endo	Judo	Men's heavyweight	July 26
Bronze	Akira Kudo	Wrestling	Men's freestyle 48 kg	July 31
Bronze	Masao Arai	Wrestling	Men's freestyle 57 kg	July 31
Bronze	Yasaburo Sugawara	Wrestling	Men's freestyle 68 kg	July 31

Medals by sport
Sport	1st place, gold medalist(s)	2nd place, silver medalist(s)	3rd place, bronze medalist(s)	Total
Gymnastics	3	4	3	10
Judo	3	1	1	5
Wrestling	2	0	4	6
Volleyball	1	0	0	1
Archery	0	1	0	1
Weightlifting	0	0	2	2
Total	9	6	10	25

== Archery ==
In their second Olympic archery competition, Japan won a silver medal and placed third on the national leaderboard for the sport. The medal was won by Hiroshi Michinaga. Two men and two women competed for Japan.

Women's Individual Competition:

- Minako Sato — 2308 points (→ 14th place)
- Kyoko Yamazaki — 2094 points (→ 26th place)

Men's Individual Competition:

- Hiroshi Michinaga — 2502 points (→ Silver Medal)
- Takanobu Nishi — 2422 points (→ 8th place)

== Athletics ==
Men's 10.000 metres

- Toshiaki Kamata

- Heat — 28:36.21 (→ did not advance)

Men's Marathon

- Shigeru So — 2:18:26 (→ 20th place)
- Noriyasu Mizukami — 2:18:44 (→ 21st place)
- Akio Usami — 2:22:29 (→ 32nd place)

Men's High Jump

- Katsumi Fukura

- Qualification — 2.13m (→ did not advance)

- Kazunori Koshikawa

- Qualification — 2.13m (→ did not advance)

Men's 20 km Race Walk

- Yoshio Morikawa — 1:42:20 (→ 34th place)

== Basketball ==
Men's team competition

- Preliminary round (group A):

- Lost to Canada (76-104)
- Lost to Mexico (90-108)
- Lost to Cuba (56-97)
- Lost to Soviet Union (69-123)
- Lost to Australia (79-117)

- Classification Match:

- 9th/11th place: Lost to Puerto Rico (91-111) → 11th place

- Team roster

- Shigeaki Abe
- Nobuo Chigusa
- Satoshi Mori
- Shoji Yuki
- Yutaka Fujimoto
- Hirofumi Numata
- Kiyohide Kuwata
- Koji Yamamoto
- Shigeto Shimizu
- Fumio Saito
- Norihiko Kitahara
- Hideki Hamaguchi

- Head coach: Masahiko Yoshida.

Women's team competition

- Team roster

- Kimiko Hashimoto
- Kazuko Kadoya
- Kimi Wakitashiro
- Mieko Fukui
- Miyako Otsuka
- Miho Matsuoka
- Kazuyo Hayashida
- Teruko Miyamoto
- Keiko Namai
- Reiko Aonuma
- Sachiyo Yamamoto
- Misako Satake

- Head coach: Masatoshi Ozaki

== Boxing ==
Men's Light Flyweight (– 48 kg)

- Noboru Uchizama
  1. First Round — Lost to Brendan Dunne (IRL), RSC-2

Men's Flyweight (– 51 kg)

- Toshinori Koga
  1. First Round — Bye
  2. Second Round — Defeated Virgilio Palomo (COL), 5:0
  3. Third Round — Lost to Ramón Duvalón (CUB), 0:5

== Cycling ==
Five cyclists represented Japan in 1976.

Sprint

- Yoshikazu Cho — 5th place

1000m time trial

- Yoshikazu Cho — 1:09.664 (→ 17th place)

Individual pursuit

- Yoichi Machishima — 15th place

Team pursuit

- Yoichi Machishima
- Tadashi Ogasawara
- Yoshiaki Ogasawara
- Tsutomu Okabori

== Fencing ==
Eight fencers, four men and four women, represented Japan in 1976.

Men's foil

- Masanori Kawatsu
- Noriyuki Sato
- Toshio Jingo

Men's team foil

- Masanori Kawatsu, Hideaki Kamei, Toshio Jingo, Noriyuki Sato

Women's foil

- Hideko Oka
- Yukari Kajihara
- Mariko Yoshikawa

Women's team foil

- Hideko Oka, Mariko Yoshikawa, Hiroko Kamada, Yukari Kajihara

== Modern pentathlon ==
Three male pentathletes represented Japan in 1976.

Men's Individual Competition:

- Shoji Uchida — 4850 points (→ 31st place)
- Akira Kubo — 4700 points (→ 37th place)
- Hiroyuki Kawazoe — 4591 points (→ 40th place)

Men's Team Competition:

- Uchida, Kubo, and Kawazoe — 14234 points (→ 12th place)

== Shooting ==
Open

Athlete	Event	Final	
Athlete	Event	Points	Rank
Taro Aso	Skeet	187	41
Saijo Hosokawa	50 m rifle, prone	588	31
Toshiyasu Ishige	Trap	177	18
Takeo Kamachi	25 m rapid fire pistol	591	12
Kazuyo Kato	Skeet	188	35
Kanji Kubo	25 m rapid fire pistol	586	20
Kaoru Matsuo	50 m rifle, three positions	1119	41
Kaoru Matsuo	50 m rifle, prone	580	68
Jitsuka Matsuoka	Trap	178	16
Masanobu Ohata	50 m pistol	545	28
Michiha Ozaki	50 m rifle, three positions	1115	44
Shigetoshi Tashiro	50 m pistol	549	21

== Volleyball ==
Men's team competition

- Preliminary round (group B)

- Defeated Italy (3-0)
- Defeated Brazil (3-0)
- Lost to Soviet Union (0-3)

- Semi Finals

- Lost to Poland (2-3)

- Bronze Medal Match

- Lost to Cuba (0-3) → Fourth place

- Team roster

- Taka Maruiyama
- Katsutoshi Nekoda
- Katsumi Oda
- Tetsuo Nishimoto
- Yassunori Yassuda
- Yoshi Fukao
- Shoichi Yanagimoto
- Mikiyasu Tanaka
- Tadayoshi Yokota
- Seiji Ohko
- Kinji Shimaoka
- Tetsuo Satō

- Head coach: Tsutomu Koyama

Women's team competition

- Preliminary round (group A)

- Defeated Hungary (3-0)
- Defeated Peru (3-0)
- Defeated Canada (3-0)

- Semi Finals

- Defeated South Korea (3-0)

- Final

- Defeated Soviet Union (3-0) → Gold Medal

- Team roster

- Takako Iida
- Mariko Okamoto
- Echiko Maeda
- Noriko Matsuda
- Takako Shirai
- Kiyomi Kato
- Yuko Arakida
- Katsuko Kanesaka
- Mariko Yoshida
- Shoko Takayanagi
- Hiromi Yano
- Juri Yokoyama

- Head coach: Shigeo Yamada
