= Fencing at the 1976 Summer Olympics – Women's foil =

Fencing at the Olympics

Women's foil at the Games of the XXI Olympiad
- Venue: University of Montréal
- Dates: 23 – 24 July 1976
- Competitors: 48 from 20 nations

Medalists
1st place, gold medalist(s)		Ildikó Schwarczenberger-Tordasi	Hungary
2nd place, silver medalist(s)		Maria Consolata Collino	Italy
3rd place, bronze medalist(s)		Yelena Novikova-Belova	Soviet Union

The women's foil was one of eight fencing events on the fencing at the 1976 Summer Olympics programme. It was the twelfth appearance of the event. The competition was held from 23 to 24 July 1976. 48 fencers from 20 nations competed.

== Competition format ==
The 1976 tournament returned to a mix of pool and knockout rounds similar to that used in 1968, after the 1972 edition briefly used a pool-only format. The competition included three pool rounds, followed by a double-elimination knockout round, finishing with a final pool round. In each pool round, the fencers competed in a round-robin.

Bouts in the round-robin pools were to 5 touches; bouts in the double-elimination round were to 8 touches. Repechages were not used in the first three rounds, but were used to determine medalists if necessary in the final.

== Results ==
=== Round 1 ===
==== Round 1 Pool A ====
Pos	Fencer	W	L	TF	TA	Qual.	ESI	CHJ	KMU	HS	YK
1	Ecaterina Stahl-Iencic (ROU)	4	0	20	9	Q		5–2	5–2	5–4	5–1
2	Claudie Herbster-Josland (FRA)	3	1	17	11	Q	2–5		5–4	5–1	5–1
3	Krystyna Machnicka-Urbańska (POL)	1	3	15	18	Q	2–5	4–5		5–3	4–5
4	Helen Smith (AUS)	1	3	13	19	Q	4–5	1–5	3–5		5–4
5	Yukari Kajihara (JPN)	1	3	11	19		1–5	1–5	5–4	4–5	

Source: Official Report, vol. 3, p. 207

==== Round 1 Pool B ====
Pos	Fencer	W	L	TF	TA	Qual.	KP	OK	KLR	MPVE	NU
1	Kerstin Palm (SWE)	4	0	20	8	Q		5–1	5–2	5–4	5–1
2	Olga Knyazeva (URS)	3	1	16	10	Q	1–5		5–3	5–1	5–1
3	Katarína Lokšová-Ráczová (TCH)	2	2	15	15	Q	2–5	3–5		5–2	5–2
4	Marie-Paule Van Eyck (BEL)	1	3	13	15	Q	4–5	1–5	3–5		5–0
5	Nancy Uranga (CUB)	0	4	4	20		1–5	1–5	2–5	0–5	

Source: Official Report, vol. 3, p. 207

==== Round 1 Pool C ====
Pos	Fencer	W	L	TF	TA	Qual.	YNB	WA	ADEP	IFB	AO
1	Yelena Novikova-Belova (URS)	3	1	17	11	Q		5–3	1–5	5–3	5–0
2	Wendy Ager (GBR)	3	1	18	13	Q	3–5		5–4	5–3	5–1
3	Ana Derșidan-Ene-Pascu (ROU)	2	2	17	15	Q	5–1	4–5		3–5	5–4
4	Ildikó Farkasinszky-Bóbis (HUN)	2	2	16	15	Q	3–5	3–5	5–3		5–2
5	Ann O'Donnell (USA)	0	4	7	20		0–5	1–5	4–5	2–5	

Source: Official Report, vol. 3, p. 207

==== Round 1 Pool D ====
Pos	Fencer	W	L	TF	TA	Qual.	GL	VS	DH	UKW	MY
1	Giulia Lorenzoni (ITA)	3	1	17	10	Q		2–5	5–3	5–1	5–1
2	Valentina Sidorova (URS)	3	1	17	13	Q	5–2		2–5	5–4	5–2
3	Donna Hennyey (CAN)	2	2	17	15	Q	3–5	5–2		4–5	5–3
4	Ute Kircheis-Wessel (FRG)	2	2	15	14	Q	1–5	4–5	5–4		5–0
5	Mariko Yoshikawa (JPN)	0	4	7	20		1–5	2–5	3–5	0–5	

Source: Official Report, vol. 3, p. 207

==== Round 1 Pool E ====
Pos	Fencer	W	L	TF	TA	Qual.	BO	MB	BW	CP	MTF
1	Brigitte Oertel (FRG)	4	0	20	5	Q		5–3	5–2	5–0	5–0
2	Magdalena Bartoș (ROU)	2	2	16	15	Q	3–5		3–5	5–4	5–1
3	Barbara Wysoczańska (POL)	2	2	14	17	Q	2–5	5–3		2–5	5–4
4	Chantal Payer (CAN)	1	3	11	17	Q	0–5	4–5	5–2		2–5
5	Milady Tack-Fang (CUB)	1	3	10	17		0–5	1–5	4–5	5–2	

Source: Official Report, vol. 3, p. 207

==== Round 1 Pool F ====
Pos	Fencer	W	L	TF	TA	Qual.	MR	MM	ClC	IST	SS
1	Margarita Rodríguez (CUB)	3	1	17	10	Q		5–2	5–2	2–5	5–1
2	Max Madsen (DEN)	3	1	17	12	Q	2–5		5–3	5–1	5–3
3	Claudine le Comte (BEL)	2	2	15	13	Q	2–5	3–5		5–1	5–2
4	Ildikó Schwarczenberger-Tordasi (HUN)	2	2	12	16	Q	5–2	1–5	1–5		5–4
5	Susan Stewart (CAN)	0	4	10	20		1–5	3–5	2–5	4–5	

Source: Official Report, vol. 3, p. 207

==== Round 1 Pool G ====
Pos	Fencer	W	L	TF	TA	Qual.	BGD	CM	HO	ISUR	SA	GM
1	Brigitte Gapais-Dumont (FRA)	5	0	25	5	Q		5–1	5–1	5–1	5–1	5–1
2	Carola Mangiarotti (ITA)	3	2	20	15	Q	1–5		5–3	5–2	4–5	5–0
3	Hideko Oka (JPN)	3	2	19	19	Q	1–5	3–5		5–3	5–3	5–3
4	Ildikó Ságiné Ujlakyné Rejtő (HUN)	2	3	16	19	Q	1–5	2–5	3–5		5–4	5–0
5	Sheila Armstrong (USA)	1	4	17	24		1–5	5–4	3–5	4–5		4–5
6	Gitty Moheban (IRI)	1	4	9	24		1–5	0–5	3–5	0–5	5–4	

Source: Official Report, vol. 3, p. 207

==== Round 1 Pool H ====
Pos	Fencer	W	L	TF	TA	Qual.	CH	CH	MCC	ND	NF	MS
1	Cornelia Hanisch (FRG)	5	0	25	11	Q		5–4	5–2	5–2	5–1	5–2
2	Clare Halsted (GBR)	4	1	24	12	Q	4–5		5–3	5–0	5–2	5–2
3	Maria Consolata Collino (ITA)	2	3	16	17	Q	2–5	3–5		1–5	5–1	5–1
4	Nili Drori (ISR)	2	3	14	19	Q	2–5	0–5	5–1		2–5	5–3
5	Nikki Franke (USA)	2	3	14	21		1–5	2–5	1–5	5–2		5–4
6	Mahvash Shafaie (IRI)	0	5	12	25		2–5	2–5	1–5	3–5	4–5	

Source: Official Report, vol. 3, p. 207

==== Round 1 Pool I ====
Pos	Fencer	W	L	TF	TA	Qual.	BLG	SW	MB	GSM	JAM	DE
1	Brigitte Latrille-Gaudin (FRA)	4	1	23	14	Q		3–5	5–3	5–2	5–3	5–1
2	Susan Wrigglesworth (GBR)	4	1	24	16	Q	5–3		4–5	5–2	5–3	5–3
3	Micheline Borghs (BEL)	3	2	21	18	Q	3–5	5–4		3–5	5–3	5–1
4	Grażyna Staszak-Makowska (POL)	2	3	16	18	Q	2–5	2–5	5–3		2–5	5–0
5	Jhila Al-Masi (IRI)	2	3	19	21		3–5	3–5	3–5	5–2		5–4
6	Dinorah Enríquez (PUR)	0	5	9	25		1–5	3–5	1–5	0–5	4–5	

Source: Official Report, vol. 3, p. 207

=== Round 2 ===
==== Round 2 Pool A ====
Pos	Fencer	W	L	TF	TA	Qual.	YNB	MM	IFB	BGD	CP	UKW
1	Yelena Novikova-Belova (URS)	4	1	22	16	Q		2–5	5–0	5–4	5–4	5–3
2	Max Madsen (DEN)	3	2	20	15	Q	5–2		2–5	5–1	3–5	5–2
3	Ildikó Farkasinszky-Bóbis (HUN)	3	2	18	20	Q	0–5	5–2		5–4	5–4	3–5
4	Brigitte Gapais-Dumont (FRA)	2	3	19	19	Q	4–5	1–5	4–5		5–2	5–2
5	Chantal Payer (CAN)	2	3	20	21		4–5	5–3	4–5	2–5		5–3
6	Ute Kircheis-Wessel (FRG)	1	4	15	23		3–5	2–5	5–3	2–5	3–5	

Source: Official Report, vol. 3, p. 209

==== Round 2 Pool B ====
Pos	Fencer	W	L	TF	TA	Qual.	CHJ	OK	KLR	BO	MB	KMU
1	Claudie Herbster-Josland (FRA)	4	1	21	14	Q		1–5	5–2	5–3	5–1	5–3
2	Olga Knyazeva (URS)	4	1	20	15	Q	5–1		0–5	5–3	5–4	5–2
3	Katarína Lokšová-Ráczová (TCH)	3	2	19	13	Q	2–5	5–0		5–2	2–5	5–1
4	Brigitte Oertel (FRG)	2	3	18	20	Q	3–5	3–5	2–5		5–3	5–2
5	Magdalena Bartoș (ROU)	2	3	18	20		1–5	4–5	5–2	3–5		5–3
6	Krystyna Machnicka-Urbańska (POL)	0	5	11	25		3–5	2–5	1–5	2–5	3–5	

Source: Official Report, vol. 3, p. 209

==== Round 2 Pool C ====
Pos	Fencer	W	L	TF	TA	Qual.	HS	CH	BW	WA	GL	DH
1	Helen Smith (AUS)	4	1	23	18	Q		3–5	5–4	5–4	5–1	5–4
2	Cornelia Hanisch (FRG)	3	2	21	15	Q	5–3		4–5	5–1	2–5	5–1
3	Barbara Wysoczańska (POL)	3	2	21	18	Q	4–5	5–4		2–5	5–2	5–2
4	Wendy Ager (GBR)	3	2	20	19	Q	4–5	1–5	5–2		5–4	5–3
5	Giulia Lorenzoni (ITA)	2	3	17	18		1–5	5–2	2–5	4–5		5–1
6	Donna Hennyey (CAN)	0	5	11	25		4–5	1–5	2–5	3–5	1–5	

Source: Official Report, vol. 3, p. 209

==== Round 2 Pool D ====
Pos	Fencer	W	L	TF	TA	Qual.	IST	KP	VS	MPVE	ADEP	MR
1	Ildikó Schwarczenberger-Tordasi (HUN)	4	1	23	16	Q		5–2	3–5	5–3	5–3	5–3
2	Kerstin Palm (SWE)	3	2	19	15	Q	2–5		2–5	5–3	5–0	5–2
3	Valentina Sidorova (URS)	3	2	21	18	Q	5–3	5–2		2–5	4–5	5–3
4	Marie-Paule Van Eyck (BEL)	2	3	17	20	Q	3–5	3–5	5–2		5–3	1–5
5	Ana Derșidan-Ene-Pascu (ROU)	2	3	16	20		3–5	0–5	5–4	3–5		5–1
6	Margarita Rodríguez (CUB)	1	4	14	21		3–5	2–5	3–5	5–1	1–5	

Source: Official Report, vol. 3, p. 209

==== Round 2 Pool E ====
Pos	Fencer	W	L	TF	TA	Qual.	ESI	GSM	SW	CM	ClC	ND
1	Ecaterina Stahl-Iencic (ROU)	5	0	25	14	Q		5–4	5–3	5–4	5–2	5–1
2	Grażyna Staszak-Makowska (POL)	3	2	21	13	Q	4–5		2–5	5–0	5–2	5–1
3	Susan Wrigglesworth (GBR)	3	2	19	15	Q	3–5	5–2		1–5	5–3	5–0
4	Carola Mangiarotti (ITA)	2	3	18	19	Q	4–5	0–5	5–1		5–3	4–5
5	Claudine le Comte (BEL)	1	4	15	21		2–5	2–5	3–5	3–5		5–1
6	Nili Drori (ISR)	1	4	8	24		1–5	1–5	0–5	5–4	1–5	

Source: Official Report, vol. 3, p. 209

==== Round 2 Pool F ====
Pos	Fencer	W	L	TF	TA	Qual.	MCC	BLG	MB	CH	ISUR	HO
1	Maria Consolata Collino (ITA)	4	1	23	16	Q		5–3	5–4	3–5	5–4	5–0
2	Brigitte Latrille-Gaudin (FRA)	3	2	20	14	Q	3–5		5–2	5–1	5–1	2–5
3	Micheline Borghs (BEL)	3	2	21	16	Q	4–5	2–5		5–2	5–4	5–0
4	Clare Halsted (GBR)	3	2	18	16	Q	5–3	1–5	2–5		5–0	5–3
5	Ildikó Ságiné Ujlakyné Rejtő (HUN)	1	4	14	21		4–5	1–5	4–5	0–5		5–1
6	Hideko Oka (JPN)	1	4	9	22		0–5	5–2	0–5	3–5	1–5	

Source: Official Report, vol. 3, p. 209

=== Round 3 ===
==== Round 3 Pool A ====
Pos	Fencer	W	L	TF	TA	Qual.	ESI	VS	KLR	GSM	BO	CH
1	Ecaterina Stahl-Iencic (ROU)	4	1	24	15	Q		4–5	5–1	5–4	5–2	5–3
2	Valentina Sidorova (URS)	4	1	22	20	Q	5–4		5–4	5–3	5–4	2–5
3	Katarína Lokšová-Ráczová (TCH)	3	2	20	21	Q	1–5	4–5		5–4	5–4	5–3
4	Grażyna Staszak-Makowska (POL)	2	3	21	22	Q	4–5	3–5	4–5		5–3	5–4
5	Brigitte Oertel (FRG)	1	4	18	22		2–5	4–5	4–5	3–5		5–2
6	Clare Halsted (GBR)	1	4	17	22		3–5	5–2	3–5	4–5	2–5	

Source: Official Report, vol. 3, p. 211

==== Round 3 Pool B ====
Pos	Fencer	W	L	TF	TA	Qual.	SW	MPVE	CH	CHJ	HS	BW
1	Susan Wrigglesworth (GBR)	4	1	24	19	Q		4–5	5–3	5–3	5–4	5–4
2	Marie-Paule Van Eyck (BEL)	3	2	20	17	Q	5–4		3–5	2–5	5–1	5–2
3	Cornelia Hanisch (FRG)	3	2	19	17	Q	3–5	5–3		5–1	5–3	1–5
4	Claudie Herbster-Josland (FRA)	2	3	18	19	Q	3–5	5–2	1–5		4–5	5–2
5	Helen Smith (AUS)	2	3	18	21		4–5	1–5	3–5	5–4		5–2
6	Barbara Wysoczańska (POL)	1	4	15	21		4–5	2–5	5–1	2–5	2–5	

Source: Official Report, vol. 3, p. 211

==== Round 3 Pool C ====
Pos	Fencer	W	L	TF	TA	Qual.	MCC	OK	KP	IFB	BLG	WA
1	Maria Consolata Collino (ITA)	4	1	22	13	Q		5–2	5–2	5–1	2–5	5–3
2	Olga Knyazeva (URS)	3	2	20	15	Q	2–5		5–1	3–5	5–3	5–1
3	Kerstin Palm (SWE)	3	2	18	16	Q	2–5	1–5		5–2	5–2	5–2
3	Ildikó Farkasinszky-Bóbis (HUN)	3	2	18	16	Q	1–5	5–3	2–5		5–0	5–3
5	Brigitte Latrille-Gaudin (FRA)	1	4	14	22		5–2	3–5	2–5	0–5		4–5
6	Wendy Ager (GBR)	1	4	14	24		3–5	1–5	2–5	3–5	5–4	

Source: Official Report, vol. 3, p. 211

==== Round 3 Pool D ====
Pos	Fencer	W	L	TF	TA	Qual.	YNB	BGD	IST	MB	CM	MM
1	Yelena Novikova-Belova (URS)	4	1	23	13	Q		3–5	5–3	5–4	5–0	5–1
2	Brigitte Gapais-Dumont (FRA)	4	1	23	18	Q	5–3		5–4	3–5	5–2	5–4
3	Ildikó Schwarczenberger-Tordasi (HUN)	3	2	22	14	Q	3–5	4–5		5–2	5–0	5–2
4	Micheline Borghs (BEL)	3	2	21	16	Q	4–5	5–3	2–5		5–2	5–1
5	Carola Mangiarotti (ITA)	1	4	9	24		0–5	2–5	0–5	2–5		5–4
6	Max Madsen (DEN)	0	5	12	25		1–5	4–5	2–5	1–5	4–5	

Source: Official Report, vol. 3, p. 211

=== Double elimination rounds ===
==== Winners brackets ====
===== Winners group 1 =====
Round of 16		Round of 8
Ecaterina Stahl-Iencic (ROU)	8
Marie-Paule Van Eyck (BEL)	5	Ecaterina Stahl-Iencic (ROU)	6
Cornelia Hanisch (FRG)	8	Cornelia Hanisch (FRG)	8
Micheline Borghs (BEL)	3

===== Winners group 2 =====
Round of 16		Round of 8
Olga Knyazeva (URS)	8
Katarína Lokšová-Ráczová (TCH)	3	Olga Knyazeva (URS)	5
Brigitte Gapais-Dumont (FRA)	8	Brigitte Gapais-Dumont (FRA)	8
Ildikó Schwarczenberger-Tordasi (HUN)	7

===== Winners group 3 =====
Round of 16		Round of 8
Yelena Novikova-Belova (URS)	8
Ildikó Farkasinszky-Bóbis (HUN)	3	Yelena Novikova-Belova (URS)	8
Claudie Herbster-Josland (FRA)	8	Claudie Herbster-Josland (FRA)	4
Susan Wrigglesworth (GBR)	7

===== Winners group 4 =====
Round of 16		Round of 8
Valentina Sidorova (URS)	8
Kerstin Palm (SWE)	4	Valentina Sidorova (URS)	7
Grażyna Staszak-Makowska (POL)	3	Maria Consolata Collino (ITA)	8
Maria Consolata Collino (ITA)	8

==== Losers brackets ====
===== Losers group 1 =====
Round of 4
Marie-Paule Van Eyck (BEL)	8
Micheline Borghs (BEL)	5
Katarína Lokšová-Ráczová (TCH)	2
Ildikó Schwarczenberger-Tordasi (HUN)	8

Round of 4
Marie-Paule Van Eyck (BEL)	2
Ecaterina Stahl-Iencic (ROU)	8
Ildikó Schwarczenberger-Tordasi (HUN)	8
Claudie Herbster-Josland (FRA)	6

Round of 2
Ecaterina Stahl-Iencic (ROU)	7
Ildikó Schwarczenberger-Tordasi (HUN)	8

===== Losers group 2 =====
Round of 4
Ildikó Farkasinszky-Bóbis (HUN)	8
Susan Wrigglesworth (GBR)	3
Kerstin Palm (SWE)	8
Grażyna Staszak-Makowska (POL)	1

Round of 4
Ildikó Farkasinszky-Bóbis (HUN)	8
Olga Knyazeva (URS)	6
Kerstin Palm (SWE)	4
Valentina Sidorova (URS)	8

Round of 2
Ildikó Farkasinszky-Bóbis (HUN)	8
Valentina Sidorova (URS)	7

=== Final round ===
The top two fencers tied at 4–1, requiring a barrage for the gold and silver medals.

Pos	Fencer	W	L	TF	TA	IST	MCC	YNB	BGD	CH	IFB
1	Ildikó Schwarczenberger-Tordasi (HUN)	4	1	21	15		1–5	5–2	5–1	5–4	5–3
1	Maria Consolata Collino (ITA)	4	1	24	12	5–1		4–5	5–2	5–3	5–1
3rd place, bronze medalist(s)	Yelena Novikova-Belova (URS)	3	2	21	19	2–5	5–4		5–4	5–1	4–5
4	Brigitte Gapais-Dumont (FRA)	2	3	17	17	1–5	2–5	4–5		5–0	5–2
5	Cornelia Hanisch (FRG)	1	4	13	22	4–5	3–5	1–5	0–5		5–2
6	Ildikó Farkasinszky-Bóbis (HUN)	1	4	13	24	3–5	1–5	5–4	2–5	2–5	

Source: Official Report, vol. 3, p. 212

Barrage

Pos	Fencer	W	L	TF	TA	IST	MCC
1st place, gold medalist(s)	Ildikó Schwarczenberger-Tordasi (HUN)	1	0	5	4		5–4
2nd place, silver medalist(s)	Maria Consolata Collino (ITA)	0	1	4	5	4–5	

Source: Official Report, vol. 3, p. 212

== Final classification ==
Fencer	Country
Ildikó Schwarczenberger-Tordasi	Hungary
Maria Consolata Collino	Italy
Yelena Novikova-Belova	Soviet Union
Brigitte Gapais-Dumont	France
Cornelia Hanisch	West Germany
Ildikó Farkasinszky-Bóbis	Hungary
Valentina Sidorova	Soviet Union
Ecaterina Stahl-Iencic	Romania
Marie-Paule Van Eyck	Belgium
Claudie Herbster-Josland	France
Kerstin Palm	Sweden
Olga Knyazeva	Soviet Union
Susan Wrigglesworth	Great Britain
Grażyna Staszak-Makowska	Poland
Micheline Borghs	Belgium
Katarína Lokšová-Ráczová	Czechoslovakia
Helen Smith	Australia
Brigitte Oertel	West Germany
Clare Halsted	Great Britain
Barbara Wysoczańska	Poland
Brigitte Latrille-Gaudin	France
Wendy Ager	Great Britain
Carola Mangiarotti	Italy
Max Madsen	Denmark
Giulia Lorenzoni	Italy
Chantal Payer	Canada
Magdalena Bartoș	Romania
Ana Derșidan-Ene-Pascu	Romania
Claudine le Comte	Belgium
Margarita Rodríguez	Cuba
Ildikó Ságiné Ujlakyné Rejtő	Hungary
Ute Kircheis-Wessel	West Germany
Hideko Oka	Japan
Nili Drori	Israel
Donna Hennyey	Canada
Krystyna Machnicka-Urbańska	Poland
Jhila Al-Masi	Iran
Nikki Franke	United States
Milady Tack-Fang	Cuba
Yukari Kajihara	Japan
Sheila Armstrong	United States
Gitty Moheban	Iran
Susan Stewart	Canada
Ann O'Donnell	United States
Mahvash Shafaie	Iran
Mariko Yoshikawa	Japan
Nancy Uranga	Cuba
Dinorah Enríquez	Puerto Rico
