= Fencing at the 1976 Summer Olympics – Women's team foil =

Fencing at the Olympics

Women's team foil at the Games of the XXI Olympiad
- Venue: University of Montréal
- Dates: 27–28 July 1976
- Competitors: 61 from 13 nations

Medalists
1st place, gold medalist(s)		Yelena Novikova-Belova, Valentina Sidorova, Olga Knyazeva, Nailya Gilyazova, Valentina Nikonova	Soviet Union
2nd place, silver medalist(s)		Brigitte Latrille-Gaudin, Brigitte Gapais-Dumont, Christine Muzio, Véronique Trinquet, Claudie Herbster-Josland	France
3rd place, bronze medalist(s)		Ildikó Schwarczenberger-Tordasi, Ildikó Ságiné Ujlakyné Rejtő, Ildikó Farkasinszky-Bóbis, Magda Maros, Edit Kovács	Hungary

The women's team foil was one of eight fencing events on the fencing at the 1976 Summer Olympics programme. It was the fifth appearance of the event. The competition was held from 27 to 28 July 1976. 61 fencers from 13 nations competed.

== Rosters ==
Canada
- Fleurette Campeau
- Susan Stewart
- Donna Hennyey
- Chantal Payer

Cuba
- Milady Tack-Fang
- Marlene Font
- Nancy Uranga
- Margarita Rodríguez

France
- Brigitte Latrille-Gaudin
- Brigitte Gapais-Dumont
- Christine Muzio
- Véronique Trinquet
- Claudie Herbster-Josland

Great Britain
- Wendy Ager
- Susan Wrigglesworth
- Hilary Cawthorne
- Clare Halsted
- Sue Green

Hungary
- Ildikó Schwarczenberger-Tordasi
- Ildikó Ságiné Ujlakyné Rejtő
- Ildikó Farkasinszky-Bóbis
- Magda Maros
- Edit Kovács

Iran
- Mariam Atchak
- Mahvash Shafaie
- Jhila Al-Masi
- Gitty Moheban

Italy
- Maria Consolata Collino
- Giulia Lorenzoni
- Doriana Pigliapoco
- Susanna Batazzi
- Carola Mangiarotti

Japan
- Hideko Oka
- Mariko Yoshikawa
- Hiroko Kamada
- Yukari Kajihara

Poland
- Jolanta Bebel-Rzymowska
- Barbara Wysoczańska
- Kamilla Składanowska
- Krystyna Machnicka-Urbańska
- Grażyna Staszak-Makowska

Romania
- Ileana Gyulai-Drîmbă-Jenei
- Marcela Moldovan-Zsak
- Ecaterina Stahl-Iencic
- Ana Derșidan-Ene-Pascu
- Magdalena Bartoș

Soviet Union
- Yelena Novikova-Belova
- Valentina Sidorova
- Olga Knyazeva
- Nailya Gilyazova
- Valentina Nikonova

United States
- Nikki Franke
- Sheila Armstrong
- Ann O'Donnell
- Gay D'Asaro
- Denise O'Connor

West Germany
- Karin Rutz-Gießelmann
- Cornelia Hanisch
- Ute Kircheis-Wessel
- Brigitte Oertel
- Jutta Höhne

== Results ==
=== Round 1 ===
==== Round 1 Pool A ====
Poland and the Soviet Union each defeated Canada, 9–7 and 14–2, respectively. The two victors then faced off. The Soviet Union won 9–2.

Pos	Team	W	L	BW	BL	Qual.	URS	POL	CAN
1	Soviet Union	2	0	23	4	QQ		9–2	14–2
2	Poland	1	1	11	16	QQ	2–9		9–7
3	Canada	0	2	9	23		2–14	7–9	

Source: Official Report, vol. 3, p. 215

==== Round 1 Pool B ====
Romania and France each defeated Cuba, 8–8 (66–60 touches advantage breaking the bouts tie) and 11–5, respectively. The two victors then faced each other for placement, with France winning 9–6.

Pos	Team	W	L	BW	BL	Qual.	FRA	ROU	CUB
1	France	2	0	19	11	QQ		9–6	11–5
2	Romania	1	1	14	16	QQ	6–9		8.66–8.60
3	Cuba	0	2	13	19		8.60–8.66	14–2	

Source: Official Report, vol. 3, p. 215

==== Round 1 Pool C ====
West Germany and Hungary each defeated Japan, 10–6 and 12–4, respectively. The two victors then faced each other for placement, with Hungary winning 8–6 (after 14 bouts, Hungary had a 60–49 touches advantage, so West Germany would still lose the tie-breaker even if it won the final 2 bouts 5–0 each time).

Pos	Team	W	L	BW	BL	Qual.	HUN	FRG	JPN
1	Hungary	2	0	20	10	QQ		8–6	12–4
2	West Germany	1	1	16	14	QQ	6–8		10–6
3	Japan	0	2	10	22		4–12	6–10	

Source: Official Report, vol. 3, p. 216

==== Round 1 Pool D ====
In the first set of pairings, Italy defeated Iran 13–3 and Great Britain beat the United States 9–7. The second set of matches saw the first-set winners both go to 2–0 and the first-set losers go to 0–2, cementing advancement as Italy prevailed over the United States 14–2 and Great Britain won against Iran 9–7. The third set only determined final placement; Italy defeated Great Britain 9–2 to take the top place (with Great Britain second) while the United States beat Iran 11–5 to finish third (over Iran in fourth).

Pos	Team	W	L	BW	BL	Qual.	ITA	GBR	USA	IRI
1	Italy	3	0	36	7	QQ		9–2	14–2	13–3
2	Great Britain	2	1	20	23	QQ	2–9		9–7	9–7
3	United States	1	2	20	28		2–14	7–9		11–5
4	Iran	0	3	15	33		3–13	7–9	5–11	

Source: Official Report, vol. 3, pp. 216–17

=== Elimination rounds ===
Quarterfinals
A1	Soviet Union	9
B2	Romania	1
D1	Italy	2
C2	West Germany	9
C1	Hungary	9
D2	Great Britain	2
B1	France	9
A2	Poland	5

Semifinals
A1	Soviet Union	9
C2	West Germany	6
C1	Hungary	8 (56)
B1	France	8 (58)

Final
A1	Soviet Union	9
B1	France	2
Third place
C2	West Germany	4
C1	Hungary	9

Consolation round
B2	Romania	5
D1	Italy	9
D2	Great Britain	8 (64)
A2	Poland	8 (66)

Fifth place
D1	Italy	9
A2	Poland	7
