= Volleyball at the 1976 Summer Olympics – Women's tournament =

Women's volleyball at the Games of the XXI Olympiad
- Venue: Montréal Forum; Paul Sauvé Arena
- Date: 19–30 July
- Competitors: 96 from 8 nations

Medalists
1st place, gold medalist(s)		Japan (2nd title)
2nd place, silver medalist(s)		Soviet Union
3rd place, bronze medalist(s)		South Korea

The 1976 Women's Olympic Volleyball Tournament was the 4th edition of the event, organized by the world's governing body, the FIVB in conjunction with the IOC. It was held in Montréal, Québec, Canada from July 19 to 30, 1976.

This is the second time the Japanese Women's National Volleyball Team won in the Olympics. The team was coached by Shigeo Yamada.

== Qualification ==
Qualifiers	Date	Host	Vacancies	Qualified
Host country	12 May 1970	(Netherlands) Amsterdam	1	Canada
1972 Olympic Games	27 Aug. – 7 Sep. 1972	(West Germany) Munich	1	Soviet Union
1974 World Championship	12–28 October 1974	(Mexico) Guadalajara	1	Japan
1975 Asian Championship	17–28 August 1975	(Australia) Melbourne	1	South Korea*
1975 NORCECA Championship	1975	(United States) Los Angeles	1	Cuba
1975 South American Championship	1975	(Paraguay) Asunción	1	Peru
1975 European Championship	18–25 October 1975	(Socialist Federal Republic of Yugoslavia) Belgrade	1	Hungary*
Last Chance tournament		(West Germany) Heidelberg	1	East Germany**
Total			8	

* South Korea and Hungary qualified as next best team as Japan and Soviet Union are already qualified.
** East Germany qualified after a last chance tournament held in Heidelberg, West Germany.

== Format ==
The tournament was played in two different stages. In the Preliminary round (first stage), the eight participants were divided into two pools of four teams. A single round-robin format was played within each pool to determine the teams position in the pool. The Final round (second stage) was played in a single elimination format, where the preliminary round two highest ranked teams in each group advanced to the semifinals and the two lowest ranked teams advanced to the 5th–8th place semifinals.

== Pools composition ==
Pool A	Pool B
Canada	Soviet Union
Peru	South Korea
Japan	East Germany
Hungary	Cuba

== Venues ==
- Montréal Forum, Québec, Canada
- Paul Sauvé Arena, Québec, Canada

== Preliminary round ==
- venue: Paul Sauvé Arena

=== Group A ===
Pos	Team	Pld	W	L	Pts	SW	SL	SR	SPW	SPL	SPR	Qualification
1	Japan	3	3	0	6	9	0	MAX	135	43	3.140	1st–4th semifinals
2	Hungary	3	2	1	5	6	5	1.200	120	132	0.909	1st–4th semifinals
3	Peru	3	1	2	4	4	8	0.500	124	154	0.805	5th–8th semifinals
4	Canada	3	0	3	3	3	9	0.333	113	163	0.693	5th–8th semifinals

Date		Score		Set 1	Set 2	Set 3	Set 4	Set 5	Total	Report
19 Jul	Hungary	0–3	Japan	6–15	3–15	4–15			13–45	Report
19 Jul	Canada	2–3	Peru	15–12	4–15	10–15	15–7	12–15	56–64	Report
21 Jul	Peru	0–3	Japan	7–15	4–15	9–15			20–45	Report
21 Jul	Canada	1–3	Hungary	13–15	10–15	15–9	9–15		47–54	Report
23 Jul	Hungary	3–1	Peru	7–15	15–8	15–3	16–14		53–40	Report
23 Jul	Japan	3–0	Canada	15–6	15–2	15–2			45–10	Report

=== Group B ===
Pos	Team	Pld	W	L	Pts	SW	SL	SR	SPW	SPL	SPR	Qualification
1	Soviet Union	3	3	0	6	9	4	2.250	186	137	1.358	1st–4th semifinals
2	South Korea	3	2	1	5	7	7	1.000	179	171	1.047	1st–4th semifinals
3	Cuba	3	1	2	4	6	7	0.857	150	168	0.893	5th–8th semifinals
4	East Germany	3	0	3	3	5	9	0.556	144	183	0.787	5th–8th semifinals

Date		Score		Set 1	Set 2	Set 3	Set 4	Set 5	Total	Report
20 Jul	South Korea	1–3	Soviet Union	14–16	15–12	2–15	14–16		45–59	Report
20 Jul	East Germany	1–3	Cuba	15–7	5–15	5–15	13–15		38–52	Report
22 Jul	Cuba	1–3	Soviet Union	9–15	15–13	11–15	10–15		45–58	Report
22 Jul	East Germany	2–3	South Korea	15–5	15–11	14–16	2–15	13–15	59–62	Report
24 Jul	South Korea	3–2	Cuba	14–16	15–4	15–8	13–15	15–10	72–53	Report
24 Jul	Soviet Union	3–2	East Germany	15–11	13–15	11–15	15–5	15–1	69–47	Report

== Final round ==
=== 5th–8th place ===
- venue: Paul Sauvé Arena.

5th–8th places
26 July
Peru	2
East Germany	3
26 July
Canada	2
Cuba	3

5th place
27 July
East Germany	0
Cuba	3
7th place
27 July
Canada	1
Peru	3

==== 5th–8th place semifinals ====
Date		Score		Set 1	Set 2	Set 3	Set 4	Set 5	Total	Report
26 Jul	Canada	2–3	Cuba	15–13	7–15	16–14	9–15	3–15	50–72	Report
26 Jul	Peru	2–3	East Germany	11–15	9–15	15–8	15–8	8–15	58–61	Report

==== 7th place match ====
Date		Score		Set 1	Set 2	Set 3	Set 4	Set 5	Total	Report
27 Jul	Canada	1–3	Peru	9–15	15–12	4–15	7–15		35–57	Report

==== 5th place match ====
Date		Score		Set 1	Set 2	Set 3	Set 4	Set 5	Total	Report
27 Jul	East Germany	0–3	Cuba	12–15	12–15	8–15			32–45	Report

=== Final Round ===
- venue: Montréal Forum.

Semifinals
29 July
Japan	3
South Korea	0
29 July
Hungary	0
Soviet Union	3

Gold medal match
30 July
Japan	3
Soviet Union	0
Bronze medal match
30 July
South Korea	3
Hungary	1

==== Semifinals ====
Date		Score		Set 1	Set 2	Set 3	Set 4	Set 5	Total	Report
29 Jul	Hungary	0–3	Soviet Union	10–15	10–15	9–15			29–45	Report
29 Jul	Japan	3–0	South Korea	15–13	15–6	15–5			45–24	Report

==== Bronze medal match ====
Date		Score		Set 1	Set 2	Set 3	Set 4	Set 5	Total	Report
30 Jul	South Korea	3–1	Hungary	12–15	15–12	15–10	15–6		57–43	Report

==== Gold medal match ====
Date		Score		Set 1	Set 2	Set 3	Set 4	Set 5	Total	Report
30 Jul	Japan	3–0	Soviet Union	15–7	15–8	15–2			45–17	Report

== Final standing ==
Rank	Team
1st place, gold medalist(s)	Japan
2nd place, silver medalist(s)	Soviet Union
3rd place, bronze medalist(s)	South Korea
4	Hungary
5	Cuba
6	East Germany
7	Peru
8	Canada

1976 Women's Olympic champions

Japan
2nd title

12-woman roster
Shoko Takayanagi, Juri Yokoyama, Mariko Yoshida, Hiromi Yano, Takako Shirai, Mariko Okamoto, Echiko Maeda, Noriko Matsuda, Yuko Arakida, Kiyomi Kato, Katsuko Kanesaka, Takako Iida
Head coach
Shigeo Yamada

== Medalists ==
Gold	Silver	Bronze
Japan Shoko Takayanagi; Juri Yokoyama; Mariko Yoshida; Hiromi Yano; Takako Shirai; Mariko Okamoto; Echiko Maeda; Noriko Matsuda; Yuko Arakida; Kiyomi Kato; Katsuko Kanesaka; Takako Iida Head coach: Shigeo Yamada	Soviet Union Lyudmila Chernysova; Larisa Bergen; Olga Kozakova; Natalya Kushnir; Nina Muradyan; Liliya Osadchaya; Nina Smoleyeva; Lyudmila Shchetinina; Inna Ryskal; Anna Rostova; Lyubov Rudovskaya; Zoya Yusova Head coach: Givi Akhvlediani	South Korea Yu Jung-hye; Yu Kyung-hwa; Jung Soon-ok; Yoon Young-nae; Park Mi-kum; Ma Kum-ja; Lee Soon-ok; Lee Soon-bok; Baik Myung-sun; Jo Hea-jung; Byon Kyung-ja; Chang Hee-sook Head coach: Lee Kyo-so
