= Volleyball at the 1974 Asian Games =

Asian games

- Venue: Aryamehr Volleyball Hall
- Dates: 2–15 September 1974
- Nations: 9

Volleyball was one of the many sports which was held at the 1974 Asian Games in Tehran, Iran. All matches played at the Volleyball Hall in Aryamehr Sport Complex.

== Medalists ==
Event	Gold	Silver	Bronze
Men	Japan; Yoshihide Fukao; Kenji Kimura; Yuzo Nakamura; Katsutoshi Nekoda; Tetsuo Nishimoto; Katsumi Oda; Tetsuo Sato; Kenji Shimaoka; Mikiyasu Tanaka; Shoichi Yanagimoto; Yasunori Yasuda; Tadayoshi Yokota	South Korea; Chung Kang-sup; Jin Jun-tak; Kang Man-soo; Kim Chung-han; Kim Kun-bong; Lee Choun-pyo; Lee In; Lee Sun-koo; Lee Yong-kwan; Park Ki-won; Suk Kyung-hong	China; Chen Fulin; Dong Chuanqiang; Fu Yuting; Jiang Shensheng; Wang Chuan; Wang Dexue; Yu Youwei; Yuan Liubin; Yuan Weimin; Zhang Yuan; Zhao Chengqing; Zhu Jiaming
Women	Japan; Yuko Arakida; Toshimi Furuta; Takako Iida; Katsuko Kanesaka; Kiyomi Kato; Echiko Maeda; Noriko Matsuda; Mariko Okamoto; Harue Saito; Takako Shirai; Hiromi Yano; Juri Yokoyama	South Korea; Choi Eun-hee; Jo Hea-jung; Jung Soon-ok; Lee Hyo-sun; Lee Kyung-sook; Lee Kyung-sun; Lee Soon-bok; Noh Chang-hee; Park In-sil; Park Jung-hui; Yu Jung-hye; Yu Kyung-hwa	China; Cao Jinxiu; Fan Guixiang; Ge Weiping; Liang Caihui; Liu Di; Qi Lixia; Wu Guoying; Xu Liyun; Xu Xiumei; Yu Liwen; Zhang Qingru; Zhang Shuhua

== Medal table ==
Rank	Nation	Gold	Silver	Bronze	Total
1	Japan (JPN)	2	0	0	2
2	South Korea (KOR)	0	2	0	2
3	China (CHN)	0	0	2	2
Totals (3 entries)		2	2	2	6

== Draw ==
The draw was held in Tehran. The men were drawn into two groups of four teams, the women were played in round robin format, six teams were registered but Khmer Republic later withdrew.

Group A

- China
- Japan
- Philippines
- India

Group B

- Iran
- South Korea
- Kuwait
- Pakistan

== Results ==
=== Men ===
==== Preliminary round ====
===== Group A =====
Pos	Team	Pld	W	L	Pts	SW	SL	SR	SPW	SPL	SPR	Qualification
1	Japan	3	3	0	6	9	0	MAX	135	57	2.368	Semifinals
2	China	3	2	1	5	6	4	1.500	128	90	1.422	Semifinals
3	India	3	1	2	4	3	7	0.429	89	119	0.748	Classification 5th–8th
4	Philippines	3	0	3	3	2	9	0.222	71	157	0.452	Classification 5th–8th

Source: Results

Date	Time		Score		Set 1	Set 2	Set 3	Set 4	Set 5	Total
02 Sep	09:00	India	0–3	China	3–15	6–15	5–15			14–45
02 Sep	16:00	Philippines	0–3	Japan	0–15	6–15	5–15			11–45
04 Sep	16:00	China	3–1	Philippines	14–16	15–4	15–5	15–6		59–31
04 Sep	17:30	Japan	3–0	India	15–6	15–6	15–10			45–22
06 Sep	10:00	India	3–1	Philippines	8–15	15–2	15–3	15–9		53–29
06 Sep	16:00	Japan	3–0	China	15–5	15–11	15–8			45–24

===== Group B =====
Pos	Team	Pld	W	L	Pts	SW	SL	SR	SPW	SPL	SPR	Qualification
1	South Korea	3	3	0	6	9	0	MAX	135	46	2.935	Semifinals
2	Iran	3	2	1	5	6	3	2.000	116	85	1.365	Semifinals
3	Pakistan	3	1	2	4	3	6	0.500	77	117	0.658	Classification 5th–8th
4	Kuwait	3	0	3	3	0	9	0.000	56	136	0.412	Classification 5th–8th

Source: Results

Date	Time		Score		Set 1	Set 2	Set 3	Set 4	Set 5	Total
03 Sep	09:00	South Korea	3–0	Kuwait	15–1	15–6	15–2			45–9
03 Sep	16:00	Iran	3–0	Pakistan	15–1	15–8	15–11			45–20
05 Sep	10:00	Pakistan	3–0	Kuwait	15–5	15–8	16–14			46–27
05 Sep	17:30	South Korea	3–0	Iran	15–13	15–3	15–10			45–26
07 Sep	16:00	Pakistan	0–3	South Korea	5–15	6–15	0–15			11–45
07 Sep	17:30	Iran	3–0	Kuwait	15–6	15–5	15–9			45–20

==== Classification 5th–8th ====
Classification 5th–8th
8 September
India	3
Kuwait	0
9 September
Pakistan	1
Philippines	3

5th place match
11 September
India	3
Philippines	1
7th place match
10 September
Kuwait	0
Pakistan	3

===== Semifinals =====
Date	Time		Score		Set 1	Set 2	Set 3	Set 4	Set 5	Total
08 Sep	18:30	India	3–0	Kuwait	15–4	15–2	15–6			45–12
09 Sep	16:00	Pakistan	1–3	Philippines	7–15	16–14	11–15	10–15		44–59

===== 7th place match =====
Date	Time		Score		Set 1	Set 2	Set 3	Set 4	Set 5	Total
10 Sep	09:00	Kuwait	0–3	Pakistan	3–15	5–15	12–15			20–45

===== 5th place match =====
Date	Time		Score		Set 1	Set 2	Set 3	Set 4	Set 5	Total
11 Sep	17:30	India	3–1	Philippines	15–2	13–15	15–6	15–1		58–24

==== Final round ====
Semifinals
9 September
Japan	3
Iran	0
10 September
South Korea	3
China	1

Gold medal match
15 September
Japan	3
South Korea	1
Bronze medal match
12 September
Iran	1
China	3

===== Semifinals =====
Date	Time		Score		Set 1	Set 2	Set 3	Set 4	Set 5	Total
09 Sep	17:30	Japan	3–0	Iran	15–3	15–3	15–10			45–16
10 Sep	16:00	South Korea	3–1	China	15–7	15–11	14–16	15–5		59–39

===== Bronze medal match =====
Date	Time		Score		Set 1	Set 2	Set 3	Set 4	Set 5	Total
12 Sep	16:00	Iran	1–3	China	3–15	4–15	15–11	12–15		34–56

===== Gold medal match =====
Date	Time		Score		Set 1	Set 2	Set 3	Set 4	Set 5	Total
15 Sep	16:00	Japan	3–1	South Korea	15–12	16–14	10–15	15–12		56–53

==== Final standing ====
Rank	Team
1st place, gold medalist(s)	Japan
2nd place, silver medalist(s)	South Korea
3rd place, bronze medalist(s)	China
4	Iran
5	India
6	Philippines
7	Pakistan
8	Kuwait

=== Women ===
Pos	Team	Pld	W	L	Pts	SW	SL	SR	SPW	SPL	SPR
1	Japan	4	4	0	8	12	2	6.000	198	94	2.106
2	South Korea	4	3	1	7	10	3	3.333	166	100	1.660
3	China	4	2	2	6	7	8	0.875	152	170	0.894
4	North Korea	4	1	3	5	5	9	0.556	158	160	0.988
5	Iran	4	0	4	4	0	12	0.000	30	180	0.167

Source: Results

Date	Time		Score		Set 1	Set 2	Set 3	Set 4	Set 5	Total
02 Sep	10:30	Iran	0–3	China	4–15	8–15	1–15			13–45
03 Sep	17:30	North Korea	0–3	South Korea	6–15	5–15	9–15			20–45
05 Sep	16:00	South Korea	3–0	China	15–8	15–3	15–8			45–19
06 Sep	17:30	Japan	3–0	North Korea	15–11	15–13	15–11			45–35
07 Sep	10:00	South Korea	3–0	Iran	15–0	15–3	15–4			45–7
08 Sep	17:30	China	1–3	Japan	6–15	15–9	3–15	0–15		24–54
10 Sep	17:30	North Korea	2–3	China	15–13	15–5	6–15	14–16	8–15	58–64
11 Sep	16:00	Iran	0–3	Japan	1–15	3–15	0–15			4–45
13 Sep		North Korea	3–0	Iran	15–3	15–3	15–0			45–6
14 Sep	17:30	Japan	3–1	South Korea	9–15	15–2	15–8	15–6		54–31
