= Basketball at the 1974 Asian Games =

- Venue: Aryamehr Basketball Hall
- Date: 2–15 September 1974
- Nations: 11

Basketball was one of the 16 sports disciplines held in the 1974 Asian Games in Tehran, Iran. Israel won their 2nd title by beating the defending champions South Korea in the championship match. This is also the first time that women's edition were held, and Japan emerged as the first-ever champions after a round-robin format. The games were held from September 2 to 15, 1974.

== Medalists ==
Event	Gold	Silver	Bronze
Men	Israel; Motti Aroesti; Mooley Avishar; Shmaryahu Zaslevsky; Shuki Schwartz; Hanan Keren; Miki Berkovich; Tal Brody; Avigdor Moskowitz; Shamuel Nachmias; Itamar Marzel; Jacob Eisner; Boaz Janay	South Korea; Lee Kwang-joon; Kim Dong-kwang; Kwak Hyun-chae; Kang Ho-seok; Yoo Hi-hyung; Cha Sung-hwan; Choi Kyung-duk; Lee Bo-sun; Hwang Jae-hwan; Lee Ja-young; Kim In-jin; Kim Kyung-tae	China; Zhang Weiping; Mo Liangui; Wang Deli; Zhang Dawei; Xuan Chengbin; Liu Changrong; Zhang Jianshe; Cai Weichu; Cai Guoqiang; Xu Zhengwen; Huang Pinjie; Zhao Liangcai
Women	Japan; Reiko Aonuma; Machiko Aoyama; Hisako Furuno; Kimiko Hashimoto; Kazuko Kadoya; Teruko Miyamoto; Eriko Nagai; Keiko Namai; Miyako Otsuka; Kimi Wakitashiro; Sachiyo Yamamoto	South Korea; Cho Myung-ok; Cho Yung-soon; Kang Hyun-suk; Kim Eun-ju; Kim Jae-soon; Lee Ock-ja; Park Sung-ja; Shin In-sup; Won Young-ja; Yoo Kwae-soon; Yoon Jung-ko; Yoon Seon-ja	China; Chen Xiushan; Du Huanwen; Fang Fengdi; Li Muzhen; Liu Yumin; Luo Xuelian; Wang Naifeng; Wang She; Wang Yuzhen; Wei Wenshan; Yang Shuying; Zhu Qihui

== Medal table ==
Rank	Nation	Gold	Silver	Bronze	Total
1	Israel (ISR)	1	0	0	1
1	Japan (JPN)	1	0	0	1
3	South Korea (KOR)	0	2	0	2
4	China (CHN)	0	0	2	2
Totals (4 entries)		2	2	2	6

== Draw ==
The draw was held in Tehran. The men were drawn into four groups of three teams but India later withdrew, the women were played in round robin format.

Group 1

- Philippines
- ~~India~~
- Israel

Group 2

- South Korea
- Iraq
- China

Group 3

- Japan
- Kuwait
- North Korea

Group 4

- Iran
- Pakistan
- Bahrain

== Results ==
=== Men ===
==== Preliminary round ====
===== Group 1 =====
Pos	Team	Pld	W	L	PF	PA	PD	Pts	Qualification
1	Israel	1	1	0	122	73	+49	2	Second round
2	Philippines	1	0	1	73	122	−49	1	Second round

Source: Results

2 September
18:30

Philippines	73–122	Israel
Scoring by half: 40–59, 33–63

Aryamehr Basketball Hall, Tehran

===== Group 2 =====
Pos	Team	Pld	W	L	PF	PA	PD	Pts	Qualification
1	China	2	2	0	235	192	+43	4	Second round
2	South Korea	2	1	1	214	192	+22	3	Second round
3	Iraq	2	0	2	190	255	−65	2	Classification 9th–11th

Source: Results

2 September
17:00

South Korea	93–101	China
Scoring by half: 55–51, 38–50

Aryamehr Basketball Hall, Tehran

4 September
16:00

Iraq	99–134	China
Scoring by half: 41–60, 58–74

Aryamehr Basketball Hall, Tehran

6 September
16:00

South Korea	121–91	Iraq
Scoring by half: 66–44, 55–47

Aryamehr Basketball Hall, Tehran

===== Group 3 =====
Pos	Team	Pld	W	L	PF	PA	PD	Pts	Qualification
1	Japan	2	2	0	178	153	+25	4	Second round
2	North Korea	2	1	1	181	147	+34	3	Second round
3	Kuwait	2	0	2	148	207	−59	2	Classification 9th–11th

Source: Results

2 September
9:00

Japan	77–75	North Korea
Scoring by half: 46–37, 31–38

Aryamehr Basketball Hall, Tehran

4 September
17:30

Kuwait	70–106	North Korea
Scoring by half: 29–57, 41–49

Aryamehr Basketball Hall, Tehran

6 September
17:30

Japan	101–78	Kuwait
Scoring by half: 59–39, 42–39

Aryamehr Basketball Hall, Tehran

===== Group 4 =====
Pos	Team	Pld	W	L	PF	PA	PD	Pts	Qualification
1	Iran	2	2	0	225	148	+77	4	Second round
2	Pakistan	2	1	1	197	176	+21	3	Second round
3	Bahrain	2	0	2	141	239	−98	2	Classification 9th–11th

Source: Results

2 September
10:30

Iran	128–62	Bahrain
Scoring by half: 57–32, 71–30

Aryamehr Basketball Hall, Tehran

4 September
19:00

Pakistan	111–79	Bahrain

Aryamehr Basketball Hall, Tehran

6 September
19:00

Iran	97–86	Pakistan
Scoring by half: 55–41, 42–45

Aryamehr Basketball Hall, Tehran

==== Classification 9th–11th ====
Pos	Team	Pld	W	L	PF	PA	PD	Pts
1	Iraq	2	2	0	204	123	+81	4
2	Kuwait	2	1	1	169	159	+10	3
3	Bahrain	2	0	2	127	218	−91	2

Source: Results

9 September
16:00

Bahrain	61–111	Iraq
Scoring by half: 29–56, 32–55

Aryamehr Basketball Hall, Tehran

September 10
15:30

Kuwait	107–66	Bahrain
Scoring by half: 54–30, 53–36

Aryamehr Basketball Hall, Tehran

12 September
16:00

Iraq	93–62	Kuwait
Scoring by half: 43–33, 50–29

Aryamehr Basketball Hall, Tehran

==== Second round ====
===== Group A =====
Pos	Team	Pld	W	L	PF	PA	PD	Pts	Qualification
1	Israel	3	3	0	218	161	+57	6	Semifinals
2	South Korea	3	2	1	336	288	+48	5	Semifinals
3	Japan	3	1	2	287	293	−6	4	Classification 5th–8th
4	Pakistan	3	0	3	175	274	−99	2	Classification 5th–8th

Source: Results

7 September
16:00

Israel	2–0	Pakistan
Walkover

Aryamehr Basketball Hall, Tehran

7 September
19:00

Japan	86–104	South Korea
Scoring by half: 46–51, 40–53

Aryamehr Basketball Hall, Tehran

9 September
17:30

Japan	133–89	Pakistan
Scoring by half: 73–44, 60–45

Aryamehr Basketball Hall, Tehran

9 September
19:00

Israel	116–93	South Korea
Scoring by half: 59–50, 57–43

Aryamehr Basketball Hall, Tehran

11 September
16:00

Pakistan	86–139	South Korea
Scoring by half: 33–66, 53–73

Aryamehr Basketball Hall, Tehran

12 September
19:00

Japan	68–100	Israel
Scoring by half: 37–41, 31–59

Aryamehr Basketball Hall, Tehran

===== Group B =====
Pos	Team	Pld	W	L	PF	PA	PD	Pts	Qualification
1	China	3	2	1	266	246	+20	5 (Note: Tied on head-to-head wins (1). Head-to-head game points average: CHN 1.024, PHI 1.017, PRK 0.960.)	Semifinals
2	Philippines	3	2	1	273	268	+5	5	Semifinals
3	North Korea	3	2	1	254	240	+14	5	Classification 5th–8th
4	Iran	3	0	3	234	273	−39	3	Classification 5th–8th

Source: Results
Notes:

7 September
17:30

China	86–77	North Korea
Scoring by half: 54–39, 32–38

Aryamehr Basketball Hall, Tehran

8 September
17:30

Philippines	93–91	Iran
Scoring by half: 55–40, 38–51

Aryamehr Basketball Hall, Tehran

September 10
17:00

China	86–91	Philippines
Scoring by half: 49–47, 37–44

Aryamehr Basketball Hall, Tehran

September 10
18:30

Iran	65–86	North Korea
Scoring by half: 35–40, 30–46

Aryamehr Basketball Hall, Tehran

12 September
17:30

Philippines	89–91	North Korea
Scoring by half: 41–46, 48–45

Aryamehr Basketball Hall, Tehran

12 September
20:30

China	94–78	Iran
Scoring by half: 51–39, 43–39

Aryamehr Basketball Hall, Tehran

==== Classification 5th–8th ====
Semifinals
13 September
Japan	86
Iran	89
13 September
Pakistan	93
North Korea	107

5th place game
14 September
Iran	74
North Korea	75
7th place game
14 September
Japan	101
Pakistan	90

===== Semifinals =====
September 13
15:30

Iran	89–86	Japan
Scoring by half: 41–44, 48–42

Aryamehr Basketball Hall, Tehran

September 13
17:00

North Korea	107–93	Pakistan
Scoring by half: 63–58, 44–35

Aryamehr Basketball Hall, Tehran

===== 7th place game =====
September 14
16:00

Japan	101–90	Pakistan
Scoring by half: 42–44, 59–46

Aryamehr Basketball Hall, Tehran

===== 5th place game =====
September 14
17:30

Iran	74–75	North Korea
Scoring by half: 34–37, 40–38

Aryamehr Basketball Hall, Tehran

==== Final round ====
Semifinals
13 September
Israel	123
Philippines	101
13 September
China	114
South Korea (OT)	119

Final
15 September
Israel	92
South Korea	85
Bronze medal game
15 September
Philippines	89
China	102

===== Semifinals =====
September 13
18:30

Israel	123–101	Philippines
Scoring by half: 62–45, 48–43

Aryamehr Basketball Hall, Tehran

September 13
20:00

China	114–119 (OT)	South Korea
Scoring by half: 52–57, 49–44 Overtime: 13–18

Aryamehr Basketball Hall, Tehran

===== Bronze medal game =====
September 15
9:30

Philippines	89–102	China
Scoring by half: 44–47, 45–55

Aryamehr Basketball Hall, Tehran

===== Final =====
September 15
15:30

Israel	92–85	South Korea
Scoring by half: 50–43, 42–42

Aryamehr Basketball Hall, Tehran

==== Final standing ====
Rank	Team	Pld	W	L
1st place, gold medalist(s)	Israel	6	6	0
2nd place, silver medalist(s)	South Korea	7	4	3
3rd place, bronze medalist(s)	China	7	5	2
4	Philippines	6	2	4
5	North Korea	7	5	2
6	Iran	7	3	4
7	Japan	7	4	3
8	Pakistan	7	1	6
9	Iraq	4	2	2
10	Kuwait	4	1	3
11	Bahrain	4	0	4

=== Women ===
Pos	Team	Pld	W	L	PF	PA	PD	Pts
1	Japan	4	4	0	321	238	+83	8
2	South Korea	4	3	1	309	248	+61	7
3	China	4	2	2	338	311	+27	6
4	Iran	4	0	4	163	347	−184	4
—	North Korea	4	1	3	305	292	+13	5

Source: Results

3 September
17:00

South Korea	84–71	China
Scoring by half: 38–31, 46–40

Aryamehr Basketball Hall, Tehran

3 September
18:30

Iran	24–89	Japan
Scoring by half: 14–43, 10–46

Aryamehr Basketball Hall, Tehran

September 5
17:00

Iran	36–95	North Korea

Aryamehr Basketball Hall, Tehran

September 5
18:30

Japan	71–70	South Korea
Scoring by half: 34–40, 37–30

Aryamehr Basketball Hall, Tehran

September 8
15:30

China	89–60	Iran
Scoring by half: 48–26, 41–34

Aryamehr Basketball Hall, Tehran

September 8
18:30

North Korea	64–77	Japan
Scoring by half: 35–32, 29–45

Aryamehr Basketball Hall, Tehran

11 September
17:30

Iran	43–74	South Korea
Scoring by half: 22–48, 21–26

Aryamehr Basketball Hall, Tehran

11 September
19:00

China	98–83	North Korea
Scoring by half: 44–39, 54–44

Aryamehr Basketball Hall, Tehran

September 14
19:00

South Korea	81–63	North Korea
Game was abandoned after North Korea walked off the court to protest the officiating.

Aryamehr Basketball Hall, Tehran

September 14
20:30

Japan	84–80	China
Scoring by half: 45–44, 39–36

Aryamehr Basketball Hall, Tehran
