= France at the 1976 Summer Olympics =

- IOC code: FRA
- NOC: French National Olympic and Sports Committee

in Montreal
- Competitors: 206 (177 men and 29 women) in 18 sports
- Flag bearer: Daniel Morelon
- Medals Ranked 15th: Gold 2 Silver 3 Bronze 4 Total 9

Summer Olympics appearances (overview)
- 1896; 1900; ~~1904~~; 1908; 1912; 1920; 1924; 1928; 1932; 1936; 1948; 1952; 1956; 1960; 1964; 1968; 1972; 1976; 1980; 1984; 1988; 1992; 1996; 2000; 2004; 2008; 2012; 2016; 2020; 2024; 2028

Other related appearances
- 1906 Intercalated Games

France competed at the 1976 Summer Olympics in Montreal, Quebec, Canada. 206 competitors, 177 men and 29 women, took part in 128 events in 18 sports.

== Medalists ==
=== Gold ===
- Guy Drut — Athletics, Men's 110m Hurdles
- Hubert Parot, Michel Roche, Marc Roguet and Marcel Rozier — Equestrian, Jumping Team Competition

=== Silver ===
- Daniel Morelon — Cycling, Men's 1000m Sprint (Scratch)
- Brigitte Dumont, Brigitte Gaudin-Latrille, Claudie Josland, Christine Muzio, and Véronique Trinquet — Fencing, Women's Foil Team Competition
- Daniel Senet — Weightlifting, Men's Lightweight

=== Bronze ===
- Bernard Talvard — Fencing, Men's Foil Individual Competition
- Daniel Revenu, Frédéric Pietruszka, Christian Noël, Didier Flament, and Bernard Talvard — Fencing, Men's Foil Team Competition
- Henri Boerio — Gymnastics, Men's Horizontal Bar
- Patrick Vial — Judo, Men's Half Middleweight (70 kg)

== Archery ==
In France's second appearance in modern Olympic archery, one woman and one man represented the nation. Albert Le Tyrant posted France's best placing since 1920.

Women's Individual Competition:

- Marie-Christine Ventrillon – 2298 points (→ 17th place)

Men's Individual Competition:

- Albert Le Tyrant – 2408 points (→ 12th place)

== Athletics ==
Men's 800 metres

- José Marajo
  - Heat — 1:49.60 (→ did not advance)
- Marcel Philippe
  - Heat — 1:50.81 (→ did not advance)
- Roqui Sanchez
  - Heat — DSQ (→ did not advance)

Men's 5,000 metres

- Jacques Boxberger
  - Heat — 13:36.94 (→ did not advance)
- Jean-Marie Conrath
  - Heat — 13:34.39 (→ did not advance)

Men's 10,000 metres

- Jean-Paul Gomez
  - Heat — 28:10.52
  - Final — 28:24.07 (→ 9th place)
- Lucien Rault
  - Heat — 29:40.76 (→ did not advance)
- Pierre Levisse
  - Heat — 32:07.84 (→ did not advance)

Men's 400m Hurdles

- Jean-Pierre Perrinelle
  - Heats — 50.78s
  - Semi Final — 50.82s (→ did not advance)
- Jean-Claude Nallet
  - Heats — 50.77s
  - Semi Final — 50.82s (→ did not advance)

Men's Marathon

- Fernand Kolbeck
  - Final — 2:22:56 (→ 34th place)

Men's 4×100 metres Relay

- Jean-Claude Amoureux, Joseph Arame, Lucien Sainte-Rose, and Dominique Chauvelot
  - Heat — 39.71s
  - Semi Final — 39.33s
  - Final — 39.16s (→ 7th place)

Men's Long Jump

- Jacques Rousseau
  - Qualification — 7.82m
  - Final — 8.00m (→ 4th place)
- Philippe Deroche
  - Qualification — 7.38m (→ did not advance)

Men's High Jump

- Paul Poaniewa
  - Qualification — 2.05m (→ did not advance)
- Jacques Aletti
  - Qualification — 2.05m (→ did not advance)

Men's Pole Vault

- François Tracanelli
  - Qualifying Round — 5.10m
  - Final — no mark (→ no ranking)

Men's 20 km Race Walk

- Gérard Lelièvre — 1:29:53 (→ 9th place)

Women's 200 metres

- Chantal Réga
  - Round 1 — 23.54
  - Round 2 — 23.22
  - Semifinals — 23.00
  - Final — 23.09 (→ 8th place)

== Boxing ==
Men's Light Flyweight (– 48 kg)

- José Leroy
  1. First Round — Lost to Said Mohamed Abdelwahab (EGY), KO-1

== Cycling ==
Fourteen cyclists represented France in 1976.

Individual road race

- Jean-René Bernaudeau — 4:47:23.0 (→ 7th place)
- Christian Jourdan — did not finish (→ no ranking)
- Francis Duteil — did not finish (→ no ranking)
- René Bittinger — did not finish (→ no ranking)

Team time trial

- Claude Buchon
- Loic Gautier
- Jean-Paul Maho
- Jean-Michel Richeux

Sprint

- Daniel Morelon — Silver Medal

1000m time trial

- Eric Vermeulen — 1:07.846 (→ 5th place)

Individual pursuit

- Jean-Jacques Rebière — 12th place

Team pursuit

- Paul Bonno
- Jean-Marcel Brouzes
- Jean-Jacques Rebière
- Pierre Trentin

== Fencing ==
18 fencers, 13 men and 5 women, represented France in 1976.

Men's foil

- Bernard Talvard
- Frédéric Pietruszka
- Christian Noël

Men's team foil

- Daniel Revenu, Christian Noël, Didier Flament, Bernard Talvard, Frédéric Pietruszka

Men's épée

- Philippe Boisse
- Philippe Riboud
- Jacques La Degaillerie

Men's team épée

- Philippe Boisse, François Jeanne, Philippe Riboud, Jacques La Degaillerie

Men's sabre

- Patrick Quivrin
- Régis Bonissent
- Philippe Bena

Men's team sabre

- Philippe Bena, Régis Bonissent, Bernard Dumont, Didier Flament, Patrick Quivrin

Women's foil

- Brigitte Gapais-Dumont
- Claudie Herbster-Josland
- Brigitte Latrille-Gaudin

Women's team foil

- Brigitte Latrille-Gaudin, Brigitte Gapais-Dumont, Christine Muzio, Véronique Trinquet, Claudie Herbster-Josland

== Modern pentathlon ==
Three male pentathletes represented France in 1976.

Individual

- Alain Cortes
- Claude Guiguet
- Michel Gueguen

Team

- Alain Cortes
- Claude Guiguet
- Michel Gueguen
