= Sheila Armstrong =

Sheila Armstrong may refer to:

- Sheila Armstrong (singer) (born 1942), English soprano
- Sheila Armstrong (fencer) (1949–2010), American fencer
- Sheila Armstrong (tennis) (1939–1979), British tennis player in the 1950s

== See also ==
- Armstrong (surname)
