= Aonuma =

Aonuma (written: 青沼 lit. "blue swamp") is a Japanese surname. Notable people with the surname include:

- Eiji Aonuma (青沼 英二; born 1963), Japanese video game designer
- Reiko Aonuma (青沼 令子; born 1954), Japanese women's basketball player
- Takako Aonuma (青沼 貴子; born 1960), Japanese manga artist

== Characters ==
- Neiru Aonuma (青沼 ねいる), a character in Wonder Egg Priority

== See also ==
- Aonuma Station, a railway station in Saku, Nagano Prefecture, Japan
