= Kajihara =

Kajihara (written: 梶原 or 加治原) is a Japanese surname. Notable people with the surname include:

- Hiroyuki Kajihara (梶原 宏之, born 1966), Japanese rugby union player
- Yukari Kajihara (加治原 由香里, born 1953), Japanese fencer
- Yumi Kajihara (梶原 悠未, born 1997), Japanese cyclist
- Zen Kajihara (梶原 善, born 1966), Japanese actor
