= Payer =

A payer is a person who makes a payment.

Payer also may refer to:

== People ==
- Evariste Payer (1887–1963), Canadian professional hockey player
- Chantal Payer (born 1953), Canadian fencer
- Helge Payer (born 1979), Austrian international footballer
- Imre Payer (1888 – 1957), Hungarian footballer.
- Serge Payer (born 1979), Canadian ice hockey player

== Places ==
- Payer Island, Franz Josef Land, Russia
- Payer Mountains, Queen Maud Land, Antarctica
- Payer Peak, a mountain in King Christian X Land, Greenland
- Mount Payer, Yamalo-Nenets Autonomous Okrug, Russia

== See also ==
- Friedrich von Payer (1847–1931), vice-chancellor of Germany during the last year of World War I
- Julius von Payer (1841–1915), best known for the North Pole expedition in 1872–74 and the discovery of Franz Josef Land
- Player (disambiguation)
- Single payer, a type of universal healthcare
