= Cambodia women's national volleyball team =

National sports team

Cambodia
- Association: Volleyball Federation of Cambodia
- Confederation: AVC
- FIVB ranking: NR (2 October 2026)

Uniforms
Home	Away
Honours
Asian Games
Bronze medal – third place	1970 Bangkok	Team
Southeast Asian Games
Gold medal – first place	1971 Kuala Lumpur	Team
Gold medal – first place	1973 Singapore	Team

The Cambodia women's national volleyball team represents Cambodia in international women's volleyball competitions and friendly matches.

It won heetad place at the Volleyball at the 1970 Asian Games event in Thailand.

It won 1st place at the Volleyball at the 1971 Southeast Asian Games event in Malaysia.

In 2019, Cambodia further announced its first women's national beach volleyball team.

In 2021, Cambodia announced its first women's national volleyball team since the 1970s. They made their women's volleyball debut at the Southeast Asian Games in the 2023 edition which was held at home.

== Current squad ==
The following is the roster in the 2023 Southeast Asian Games. Head coach:

Cambodian Women's National Volleyball Team for 2023 Cambodia SEA Games
No.	Name	Position	Date of birth	Height	Weight
4	Danet Moeurn	–	-	-	-
	Borey Vann				
6	Ravy Horm				
	Sopheavy Uy				
	Sochan Rorun				
9	Thidajeannie Neth				
	Sreina Chhorurn				
	Theara Chhun				
13	Makara Phay				
	Paolak Chhoeurn				
	Sineut Vi				
17	Makara Kim				
18	Sreyphea An				
19	Molika Soeu				

== Competition record ==
=== Asian Games ===
Champions Runners up Third place Fourth place

Asian Games
Year	Round	Position	Pld	W	L	SW	SL	Squad
(Thailand) 1970	Round Robin	3rd place	–	–	–	–	–	
Total	0 Titles	3rd Position						—

=== GANEFO ===
Champions Runners-up Third place Fourth place

GANEFO record
Year	Round	Position	Pld	W	L	SW	SL	Squad
(Cambodia) 1966	Round robin	4th place	3	0	3	-	-	-

=== SEA Games ===
Champions Runners up Third place Fourth place

SEA Games record
Year	Position	Pld	W	L	SW	SL	Squad
(Malaysia) 1971	Champions	No info					Squad
(Singapore) 1973	Champions	3	3	0	9	1	Squad
(Cambodia) 2023	8th place	5	0	5	0	15	Squad
Total	2 Title	—					
