= 1974 FIVB Women's Volleyball World Championship =

Volleyball competition held in Mexico

1974 FIVB Women's World Championship
Tournament details
- Host country: Mexico
- Dates: 13–27 October
- Teams: 24 (1 withdraw)
- Venue: (in 6 host cities)
- Officially opened by: Luis Echeverría

Final positions
- Champions: Japan (3rd title)
- Runners-up: Soviet Union
- Third place: South Korea
- Fourth place: East Germany

The 1974 FIVB Women's World Championship was the seventh edition of the tournament, organised by the world's governing body, the FIVB. It was held from 13 to 27 October 1974 in Mexico.

== Teams ==
- Bahamas
- Brazil
- Bulgaria
- Canada
- China
- Cuba
- Czechoslovakia
- Dominican Republic
- East Germany
- France
- Hungary
- Japan
- Mexico
- Netherlands
- North Korea (withdraw)
- Peru
- Philippines
- Poland
- Puerto Rico
- Romania
- South Korea
- Soviet Union
- United States
- West Germany

== Venues ==
Pool D, I	Pool A, G, Final round	Pool C, H, Final round	1974 FIVB Women's Volleyball World Championship is located in Mexico
Tijuana	Guadalajara; Zapopan	Monterrey	1974 FIVB Women's Volleyball World Championship is located in Mexico
Auditorio Fausto Gutierrez Moreno	Auditorio Benito Juarez	Gimnasio Tecnológico	1974 FIVB Women's Volleyball World Championship is located in Mexico
Capacity: 4.500	Capacity: 10.000	Capacity: 4.000	1974 FIVB Women's Volleyball World Championship is located in Mexico
Pool F, N	Pool B, L, Final round	Pool E, M, Final round	1974 FIVB Women's Volleyball World Championship is located in Mexico
Toluca	Mexico City	Puebla	1974 FIVB Women's Volleyball World Championship is located in Mexico
Gimnasio Juan Fernández Albarrán	Auditorio Nacional	Gimnasio Puebla 74	1974 FIVB Women's Volleyball World Championship is located in Mexico
Capacity: 4.000	Capacity: 10.000	Capacity: 4.000	1974 FIVB Women's Volleyball World Championship is located in Mexico

== Format ==
The tournament was played in three different stages (first, second and final rounds). In the First round, the 24 participants were divided in six groups (A to F, five groups of four teams and one group of three teams). A single round-robin format was played within each group to determine the teams group position, all teams progressed to the next round.

In the Second round, six new groups were created, three groups of four teams playing for 1st-12th (G, H and I) and three groups (two of four teams and one of three teams) playing for 13th-24th (L, M and N), teams were allocated to a group according to their First round group position (best two teams of each group going to 1st-12th groups and the remaining teams to 13th-24th groups). A single round-robin format was played within each group to determine the teams group position, all teams progressed to the next round.

In the Final round, four groups were created (1st-6th, 7th-12th, 13th-18th and 19th-24th), teams were allocated to a group according to their Second round group position (groups G, H, and I best two teams to 1st-6th and bottom two teams to 7st-12th, while groups L, M and N best two teams to 13th-18th and bottom teams to 19th-24th). A single round-robin format was played within each group to determine the final standings.

== Pools composition ==
Pool A	Pool B	Pool C	Pool D	Pool E	Pool F
Bahamas	Dominican Republic	China	Cuba	Brazil	Bulgaria
France	East Germany	Japan	North Korea	Hungary	Canada
Mexico	Netherlands	Poland	Peru	Philippines	Czechoslovakia
United States	Soviet Union	West Germany	Puerto Rico	Romania	South Korea

== Results ==
=== First round ===
==== Pool A ====
Location: Guadalajara

Pos	Team	Pld	W	L	Pts	SW	SL	SR	SPW	SPL	SPR	Qualification
1	Mexico	3	3	0	6	9	0	MAX	135	53	2.547	1st–12th pools
2	United States	3	2	1	5	6	5	1.200	127	126	1.008	1st–12th pools
3	France	3	1	2	4	4	6	0.667	114	120	0.950	13th–24th pools
4	Bahamas	3	0	3	3	1	9	0.111	70	147	0.476	13th–24th pools

Date		Score		Set 1	Set 2	Set 3	Set 4	Set 5	Total
13 Oct	Mexico	3–0	Bahamas	15–6	15–4	15–5			45–15
13 Oct	United States	3–1	France	15–10	17–15	7–15	15–7		54–47
14 Oct	Mexico	3–0	France	15–5	15–8	15–9			45–22
14 Oct	United States	3–1	Bahamas	15–5	15–0	11–15	16–14		57–34
15 Oct	Mexico	3–0	United States	15–5	15–7	15–4			45–16
15 Oct	France	3–0	Bahamas	15–6	15–8	15–7			45–21

==== Pool B ====
Location: Mexico City

Pos	Team	Pld	W	L	Pts	SW	SL	SR	SPW	SPL	SPR	Qualification
1	Soviet Union	3	3	0	6	9	1	9.000	151	58	2.603	1st–12th pools
2	East Germany	3	2	1	5	6	5	1.200	127	122	1.041	1st–12th pools
3	Dominican Republic	3	1	2	4	3	6	0.500	74	112	0.661	13th–24th pools
4	Netherlands	3	0	3	3	3	9	0.333	109	169	0.645	13th–24th pools

Date		Score		Set 1	Set 2	Set 3	Set 4	Set 5	Total
13 Oct	East Germany	3–2	Netherlands	16–6	9–15	8–15	15–11	15–11	63–58
13 Oct	Soviet Union	3–0	Dominican Republic	15–5	15–4	15–1			45–10
14 Oct	Soviet Union	3–1	Netherlands	15–4	15–2	16–18	15–5		61–29
14 Oct	East Germany	3–0	Dominican Republic	15–5	15–11	15–3			45–19
15 Oct	Dominican Republic	3–0	Netherlands	15–6	15–7	15–9			45–22
15 Oct	Soviet Union	3–0	East Germany	15–7	15–3	15–9			45–19

==== Pool C ====
Location: Monterrey

Pos	Team	Pld	W	L	Pts	SW	SL	SR	SPW	SPL	SPR	Qualification
1	Japan	3	3	0	6	9	0	MAX	135	18	7.500	1st–12th pools
2	Poland	3	2	1	5	6	4	1.500	112	119	0.941	1st–12th pools
3	China	3	1	2	4	4	6	0.667	105	113	0.929	13th–24th pools
4	West Germany	3	0	3	3	0	9	0.000	33	135	0.244	13th–24th pools

Date		Score		Set 1	Set 2	Set 3	Set 4	Set 5	Total
13 Oct	Poland	3–1	China	16–14	15–9	12–15	17–15		60–53
13 Oct	Japan	3–0	West Germany	15–4	15–0	15–0			45–4
14 Oct	Japan	3–0	China	15–3	15–4	15–0			45–7
14 Oct	Poland	3–0	West Germany	15–1	15–12	15–8			45–21
15 Oct	Japan	3–0	Poland	15–1	15–6	15–0			45–7
15 Oct	China	3–0	West Germany	15–4	15–2	15–2			45–8

==== Pool D ====
Location: Tijuana

Pos	Team	Pld	W	L	Pts	SW	SL	SR	SPW	SPL	SPR	Qualification
1	Cuba	3	3	0	6	9	0	MAX	135	34	3.971	1st–12th pools
2	Peru	3	2	1	5	6	3	2.000	117	59	1.983	1st–12th pools
3	Puerto Rico	3	1	2	4	3	6	0.500	86	90	0.956	13th–24th pools
4	North Korea (Note: North Korea withdrew after the draw)	3	0	3	3	0	9	0.000	0	135	0.000	Withdrew

Notes:

Date		Score		Set 1	Set 2	Set 3	Set 4	Set 5	Total
13 Oct	Peru	3–0	Puerto Rico	15–5	15–2	15–7			45–14
13 Oct	North Korea	0–3	Cuba	0–15	0–15	0–15			0–45
14 Oct	Cuba	3–0	Puerto Rico	15–0	15–5	15–2			45–7
14 Oct	North Korea	0–3	Peru	0–15	0–15	0–15			0–45
15 Oct	Cuba	3–0	Peru	15–12	15–7	15–8			45–27
15 Oct	Puerto Rico	3–0	North Korea	15–0	15–0	15–0			45–0

==== Pool E ====
Location: Puebla City

Pos	Team	Pld	W	L	Pts	SW	SL	SR	SPW	SPL	SPR	Qualification
1	Romania	3	2	1	5	8	4	2.000	169	121	1.397	1st–12th pools
2	Hungary	3	2	1	5	8	5	1.600	172	143	1.203	1st–12th pools
3	Brazil	3	2	1	5	7	5	1.400	150	131	1.145	13th–24th pools
4	Philippines	3	0	3	3	0	9	0.000	39	135	0.289	13th–24th pools

Date		Score		Set 1	Set 2	Set 3	Set 4	Set 5	Total
13 Oct	Hungary	3–0	Philippines	15–4	15–2	15–2			45–8
13 Oct	Romania	3–1	Brazil	15–9	11–15	15–3	15–11		56–38
14 Oct	Romania	3–0	Philippines	15–3	15–6	15–5			45–14
14 Oct	Brazil	3–2	Hungary	14–16	8–15	15–7	15–11	15–9	67–58
15 Oct	Hungary	3–2	Romania	12–15	10–15	17–15	15–10	15–13	69–68
15 Oct	Brazil	3–0	Philippines	15–5	15–2	15–10			45–17

==== Pool F ====
Location: Toluca de Lerdo

Pos	Team	Pld	W	L	Pts	SW	SL	SR	SPW	SPL	SPR	Qualification
1	South Korea	3	3	0	6	9	3	3.000	167	130	1.285	1st–12th pools
2	Canada	3	2	1	5	6	6	1.000	138	158	0.873	1st–12th pools
3	Bulgaria	3	1	2	4	7	8	0.875	187	183	1.022	13th–24th pools
4	Czechoslovakia	3	0	3	3	4	9	0.444	160	181	0.884	13th–24th pools

Date		Score		Set 1	Set 2	Set 3	Set 4	Set 5	Total
13 Oct	Canada	3–1	Czechoslovakia	9–15	15–10	15–12	16–14		55–51
13 Oct	South Korea	3–2	Bulgaria	10–15	10–15	15–7	15–12	15–7	65–56
14 Oct	South Korea	3–1	Czechoslovakia	15–12	15–5	12–15	15–12		57–44
14 Oct	Canada	3–2	Bulgaria	2–15	5–15	16–14	15–9	15–9	53–62
15 Oct	Bulgaria	3–2	Czechoslovakia	16–14	15–17	8–15	15–13	15–6	69–65
15 Oct	South Korea	3–0	Canada	15–13	15–7	15–10			45–30

=== Second round ===
==== 1st–12th pools ====
===== Pool G =====
Location: Guadalajara

Pos	Team	Pld	W	L	Pts	SW	SL	SR	SPW	SPL	SPR	Qualification
1	South Korea	3	3	0	6	9	0	MAX	135	49	2.755	Final places
2	East Germany	3	2	1	5	6	5	1.200	137	122	1.123	Final places
3	Mexico	3	1	2	4	5	6	0.833	113	139	0.813	7th–12th places
4	Peru	3	0	3	3	0	9	0.000	60	135	0.444	7th–12th places

Date	Time		Score		Set 1	Set 2	Set 3	Set 4	Set 5	Total
18 Oct	18:00	South Korea	3–0	East Germany	15–5	15–7	15–10			45–22
18 Oct	20:00	Mexico	3–0	Peru	15–10	15–5	15–9			45–24
19 Oct	18:00	South Korea	3–0	Peru	15–10	15–4	15–3			45–17
19 Oct	20:00	East Germany	3–2	Mexico	12–15	15–7	13–15	15–11	15–10	70–58
20 Oct	12:00	East Germany	3–0	Peru	15–8	15–3	15–8			45–19
20 Oct	20:00	South Korea	3–0	Mexico	15–5	15–2	15–3			45–10

===== Pool H =====
Location: Monterrey

Pos	Team	Pld	W	L	Pts	SW	SL	SR	SPW	SPL	SPR	Qualification
1	Japan	3	3	0	6	9	1	9.000	148	71	2.085	Final places
2	Hungary	3	2	1	5	6	4	1.500	118	101	1.168	Final places
3	Cuba	3	1	2	4	5	6	0.833	121	133	0.910	7th–12th places
4	United States	3	0	3	3	0	9	0.000	53	135	0.393	7th–12th places

Date		Score		Set 1	Set 2	Set 3	Set 4	Set 5	Total
18 Oct	Cuba	3–0	United States	15–6	15–13	15–2			45–21
18 Oct	Japan	3–0	Hungary	15–8	15–7	15–4			45–19
19 Oct	Hungary	3–1	Cuba	15–8	15–10	9–15	15–4		54–37
19 Oct	Japan	3–0	United States	15–0	15–4	15–9			45–13
20 Oct	Hungary	3–0	United States	15–11	15–1	15–7			45–19
20 Oct	Japan	3–1	Cuba	15–5	15–12	13–15	15–7		58–39

===== Pool I =====
Location: Tijuana

Pos	Team	Pld	W	L	Pts	SW	SL	SR	SPW	SPL	SPR	Qualification
1	Romania	3	3	0	6	9	2	4.500	155	118	1.314	Final places
2	Soviet Union	3	2	1	5	7	5	1.400	159	127	1.252	Final places
3	Poland	3	1	2	4	4	6	0.667	120	119	1.008	7th–12th places
4	Canada	3	0	3	3	2	9	0.222	89	159	0.560	7th–12th places

Date		Score		Set 1	Set 2	Set 3	Set 4	Set 5	Total
18 Oct	Romania	3–1	Poland	15–11	15–10	9–15	15–9		54–45
18 Oct	Soviet Union	3–2	Canada	11–15	15–1	13–15	15–7	15–3	69–41
19 Oct	Poland	3–0	Canada	15–9	15–2	15–8			45–19
19 Oct	Romania	3–1	Soviet Union	15–8	11–15	15–11	15–10		56–44
20 Oct	Romania	3–0	Canada	15–9	15–11	15–9			45–29
20 Oct	Soviet Union	3–0	Poland	16–14	15–10	15–6			46–30

==== 13th–24th pools ====
===== Pool L =====
Location: Mexico City

Pos	Team	Pld	W	L	Pts	SW	SL	SR	SPW	SPL	SPR	Qualification
1	Bulgaria	3	3	0	6	9	0	MAX	135	41	3.293	13th–18th places
2	Netherlands	3	2	1	5	6	3	2.000	120	62	1.935	13th–18th places
3	France	3	1	2	4	3	6	0.500	93	90	1.033	19th–23rd places
4	North Korea	3	0	3	3	0	9	0.000	0	135	0.000	Withdrew

Date		Score		Set 1	Set 2	Set 3	Set 4	Set 5	Total
18 Oct	Bulgaria	3–0	France	15–8	15–3	15–0			45–11
18 Oct	Netherlands	3–0	North Korea	15–0	15–0	15–0			45–0
19 Oct	Bulgaria	3–0	Netherlands	15–6	15–11	15–13			45–30
19 Oct	North Korea	0–3	France	0–15	0–15	0–15			0–45
20 Oct	Netherlands	3–0	France	15–2	15–5	15–10			45–17
18 Oct	Bulgaria	3–0	North Korea	15–0	15–0	15–0			45–0

===== Pool M =====
Location: Puebla City

Pos	Team	Pld	W	L	Pts	SW	SL	SR	SPW	SPL	SPR	Qualification
1	Czechoslovakia	3	3	0	6	9	0	MAX	136	59	2.305	13th–18th places
2	Brazil	3	2	1	5	6	3	2.000	114	88	1.295	13th–18th places
3	West Germany	3	1	2	4	3	6	0.500	92	108	0.852	19th–23rd places
4	Dominican Republic	3	0	3	3	0	9	0.000	48	135	0.356	19th–23rd places

Date		Score		Set 1	Set 2	Set 3	Set 4	Set 5	Total
18 Oct	Brazil	3–0	Dominican Republic	15–6	15–6	15–5			45–17
18 Oct	Czechoslovakia	3–0	West Germany	15–5	15–13	15–4			45–22
19 Oct	West Germany	3–0	Dominican Republic	15–4	15–9	15–5			45–18
19 Oct	Czechoslovakia	3–0	Brazil	15–8	15–2	16–14			46–24
20 Oct	Brazil	3–0	West Germany	15–8	15–10	15–7			45–25
20 Oct	Czechoslovakia	3–0	Dominican Republic	15–3	15–7	15–3			45–13

===== Pool N =====
Location: Toluca de Lerdo

Pos	Team	Pld	W	L	Pts	SW	SL	SR	SPW	SPL	SPR	Qualification
1	China	3	3	0	6	9	0	MAX	135	20	6.750	13th–18th places
2	Philippines	3	2	1	5	6	3	2.000	101	91	1.110	13th–18th places
3	Bahamas	3	1	2	4	3	8	0.375	87	155	0.561	19th–23rd places
4	Puerto Rico	3	0	3	3	2	9	0.222	88	145	0.607	19th–23rd places

Date		Score		Set 1	Set 2	Set 3	Set 4	Set 5	Total
18 Oct	Philippines	3–0	Puerto Rico	15–10	15–5	15–2			45–17
18 Oct	China	3–0	Bahamas	15–1	15–1	15–1			45–3
19 Oct	China	3–0	Puerto Rico	15–2	15–3	15–1			45–6
19 Oct	Philippines	3–0	Bahamas	15–11	15–13	15–5			45–29
20 Oct	China	3–0	Philippines	15–5	15–1	15–5			45–11
20 Oct	Bahamas	3–2	Puerto Rico	9–15	1–15	15–9	15–13	15–13	55–65

=== Final round ===
==== 19th–24th places ====
Location: Mexico City

Pos	Team	Pld	W	L	Pts	SW	SL	SR	SPW	SPL	SPR
19	West Germany	5	5	0	10	15	2	7.500	203	117	1.735
20	France	5	4	1	9	13	4	3.250	181	134	1.351
21	Dominican Republic	5	3	2	8	10	7	1.429	162	172	0.942
22	Puerto Rico	5	2	3	7	7	10	0.700	147	185	0.795
23	Bahamas	5	1	4	6	5	12	0.417	118	203	0.581
24	North Korea	5	0	5	5	0	15	0.000	0	0	—

Date		Score		Set 1	Set 2	Set 3	Set 4	Set 5	Total
22 Oct	West Germany	3–0	Puerto Rico	15–9	15–6	15–10			45–25
22 Oct	Dominican Republic	3–1	Bahamas	15–5	13–15	15–7	15–7		58–34
23 Oct	France	3–1	Puerto Rico	15–9	15–7	12–15	15–1		57–32
23 Oct	West Germany	3–0	Bahamas	15–3	15–5	15–13			45–21
24 Oct	France	3–0	Bahamas	15–5	15–12	15–9			45–26
24 Oct	West Germany	3–1	Dominican Republic	15–8	13–15	15–9	15–5		58–37
26 Oct	France	3–0	Dominican Republic	15–3	15–7	15–11			45–21
26 Oct	Puerto Rico	3–1	Bahamas	?–?	?–?	?–?	?–?		55–37
27 Oct	West Germany	3–1	France	15–5	10–15	15–1	15–13		55–34
27 Oct	Dominican Republic	3–0	Puerto Rico	15–12	16–14	15–9			46–35

==== 13th–18th places ====
Location: Puebla City

Pos	Team	Pld	W	L	Pts	SW	SL	SR	SPW	SPL	SPR
13	Bulgaria	5	5	0	10	15	3	5.000	265	171	1.550
14	China	5	4	1	9	13	5	2.600	247	175	1.411
15	Brazil	5	3	2	8	9	8	1.125	210	197	1.066
16	Netherlands	5	2	3	7	6	11	0.545	180	218	0.826
17	Czechoslovakia	5	1	4	6	10	12	0.833	278	285	0.975
18	Philippines	5	0	5	5	1	15	0.067	104	238	0.437

Date		Score		Set 1	Set 2	Set 3	Set 4	Set 5	Total
22 Oct	Bulgaria	3–0	Netherlands	15–9	15–4	15–5			45–18
22 Oct	Brazil	3–0	Philippines	15–0	15–3	15–3			45–6
22 Oct	China	3–2	Czechoslovakia	15–12	15–13	9–15	12–15	15–7	66–62
23 Oct	Bulgaria	3–1	China	15–12	15–9	12–15	15–10		57–46
23 Oct	Brazil	3–0	Netherlands	15–12	15–12	15–13			45–37
23 Oct	Czechoslovakia	3–0	Philippines	15–8	15–10	15–10			45–28
24 Oct	Brazil	3–2	Czechoslovakia	9–15	15–12	11–15	17–15	15–7	67–64
24 Oct	China	3–0	Netherlands	15–5	15–7	15–4			45–16
24 Oct	Bulgaria	3–1	Philippines	13–15	15–5	15–6	15–6		58–32
26 Oct	Netherlands	3–2	Czechoslovakia	10–15	7–15	15–7	17–15	15–11	64–63
26 Oct	Bulgaria	3–0	Brazil	15–13	15–7	15–11			45–31
26 Oct	China	3–0	Philippines	15–5	15–4	15–9			45–18
27 Oct	Bulgaria	3–1	Czechoslovakia	15–7	15–17	15–13	15–7		60–44
27 Oct	China	3–0	Brazil	15–7	15–4	15–11			45–22
27 Oct	Netherlands	3–0	Philippines	15–10	15–6	15–4			45–20

==== 7th–12th places ====
Location: Monterrey

Pos	Team	Pld	W	L	Pts	SW	SL	SR	SPW	SPL	SPR
7	Cuba	5	5	0	10	15	1	15.000	234	140	1.671
8	Peru	5	4	1	9	12	6	2.000	0	0	—
9	Poland	5	3	2	8	11	8	1.375	252	218	1.156
10	Mexico	5	2	3	7	8	12	0.667	236	244	0.967
11	Canada	5	1	4	6	7	12	0.583	0	0	—
12	United States	5	0	5	5	1	15	0.067	110	238	0.462

Date		Score		Set 1	Set 2	Set 3	Set 4	Set 5	Total
22 Oct	Cuba	3–0	Peru	15–10	15–7	15–10			45–27
22 Oct	Poland	3–0	Canada	15–9	15–2	15–8			45–19
22 Oct	Mexico	3–1	United States	13–15	15–1	15–6	15–7		58–29
23 Oct	Peru	3–0	United States	15–4	15–5	15–6			45–15
23 Oct	Cuba	3–1	Canada	8–15	15–12	15–8	15–7		53–42
23 Oct	Poland	3–2	Mexico	15–12	13–15	14–16	15–13	15–10	72–66
24 Oct	Cuba	3–0	United States	15–13	15–4	15–1			45–18
24 Oct	Mexico	3–2	Canada	9–15	8–15	15–7	15–3	15–13	62–53
24 Oct	Peru	3–2	Poland	?–?	?–?	?–?	?–?	?–?	62–60
26 Oct	Peru	3–0	Mexico	15–12	15–10	15–5			45–27
26 Oct	Canada	3–0	United States	15–0	15–10	15–13			45–23
26 Oct	Cuba	3–0	Poland	16–14	15–12	15–4			46–30
27 Oct	Poland	3–0	United States	15–12	15–5	15–8			45–25
27 Oct	Peru	3–1	Canada	?–?	?–?	?–?	?–?		?–?
27 Oct	Cuba	3–0	Mexico	15–7	15–8	15–8			45–23

==== Final places ====
Location: Guadalajara

Pos	Team	Pld	W	L	Pts	SW	SL	SR	SPW	SPL	SPR
1	Japan	5	5	0	10	15	1	15.000	239	119	2.008
2	Soviet Union	5	4	1	9	12	3	4.000	209	173	1.208
3	South Korea	5	3	2	8	10	8	1.250	239	216	1.106
4	East Germany	5	2	3	7	7	9	0.778	185	183	1.011
5	Romania	5	1	4	6	3	12	0.250	147	200	0.735
6	Hungary	5	0	5	5	1	15	0.067	105	233	0.451

Date	Time		Score		Set 1	Set 2	Set 3	Set 4	Set 5	Total
22 Oct	16:00	Japan	3–0	East Germany	15–2	15–8	15–10			45–20
22 Oct	17:30	Romania	3–0	Hungary	15–3	15–3	15–12			45–18
22 Oct	19:00	Soviet Union	3–0	South Korea	16–14	23–21	15–13			54–48
23 Oct	17:00	East Germany	3–0	Romania	15–9	15–2	15–12			45–23
23 Oct	18:30	Soviet Union	3–0	Hungary	15–4	15–5	15–13			45–22
23 Oct	20:00	Japan	3–1	South Korea	15–4	15–10	14–16	15–5		59–35
24 Oct	17:00	Soviet Union	3–0	East Germany	15–13	15–11	15–7			45–31
24 Oct	18:30	South Korea	3–1	Hungary	15–5	15–7	8–15	15–5		53–32
24 Oct	20:00	Japan	3–0	Romania	15–6	15–7	15–12			45–25
26 Oct	17:00	South Korea	3–1	East Germany	15–13	15–7	11–15	15–9		56–44
26 Oct	18:30	Japan	3–0	Hungary	15–8	15–5	15–6			45–19
26 Oct	20:00	Soviet Union	3–0	Romania	15–10	15–8	15–9			45–27
27 Oct	17:00	East Germany	3–0	Hungary	15–4	15–6	15–4			45–14
27 Oct	18:30	South Korea	3–0	Romania	17–15	15–5	15–7			47–27
27 Oct	20:00	Japan	3–0	Soviet Union	15–10	15–6	15–4			45–20

== Final standing ==
Rank	Team
1st place, gold medalist(s)	Japan
2nd place, silver medalist(s)	Soviet Union
3rd place, bronze medalist(s)	South Korea
4	East Germany
5	Romania
6	Hungary
7	Cuba
8	Peru
9	Poland
10	Mexico
11	Canada
12	United States
13	Bulgaria
14	China
15	Brazil
16	Netherlands
17	Czechoslovakia
18	Philippines
19	West Germany
20	France
21	Dominican Republic
22	Puerto Rico
23	Bahamas
24	North Korea

Qualified for the 1976 Olympic Games as hosts
Qualified for the 1976 Olympic Games as reigning champions
Qualified for the 1976 Olympic Games

1974 Women's World champions

Japan
3rd title

Team roster
Yuko Arakida, Toshimi Furuta, Takako Iida, Katsuko Kanesaka, Kiyomi Kato, Mitsue Koyama, Noriko Matsuda, Mariko Okamoto, Harue Saito, Takako Shirai, Hiromi Yano, Juri Yokoyama
Head coach
Shigeo Yamada
