= Fencing at the 1975 Mediterranean Games =

Fencing competition

- Location: Algiers, Algeria
- Dates: August–September 1975

The fencing competition at the 1975 Mediterranean Games was held in Algiers, the capital of Algeria.

== Medalists ==
=== Men's events ===
Event	Gold	Silver	Bronze
Individual épée	John Pezza (ITA)	Philippe Riboud (FRA)	Stefano Bellone (ITA)
Individual foil	Bernard Talvard (ITA)	Carlo Montano (ITA)	Giovanni Battista Coletti (ITA)
Individual sabre	Michele Maffei (ITA)	Mario Aldo Montano (ITA)	Philippe Vitrac (FRA)

=== Women's events ===
Event	Gold	Silver	Bronze
Individual foil	Claudie Josland (FRA)	Brigitte Dumont (FRA)	Carola Mangiarotti (ITA)

== Medal table ==
Rank	Nation	Gold	Silver	Bronze	Total
1	Italy (ITA)	3	2	3	8
2	France (FRA)	1	2	1	4
Totals (2 entries)		4	4	4	12
