= Volleyball at the 1970 Asian Games =

- Dates: 10–19 December 1970
- Nations: 9

Volleyball events were contested at the 1970 Asian Games in Bangkok, Thailand.

== Medalists ==
Event	Gold	Silver	Bronze
Men	Japan; Yoshihide Fukao; Kenji Kimura; Isao Koizumi; Yasuaki Mitsumori; Jungo Morita; Yuzo Nakamura; Katsutoshi Nekoda; Keiichi Numakura; Seiji Oko; Tetsuo Sato; Kenji Shimaoka; Tadayoshi Yokota	South Korea; Cho Jae-hak; Chung Dong-kee; Jin Jun-tak; Kim Chung-han; Kim Kil-tae; Kim Kun-bong; Kim Young-dae; Kim Young-nam; Lee Choun-pyo; Lee Sun-koo; Lee Yong-kwan; Woo Chul-woo	Republic of China; Chen Chiang-shui; Chou Lung-hsiung; Hu Chung-ming; Hu Wen-hsiung; Su Shui-sheng; Sun Chia-hsiung; Tang Shan-pen; Wang I-hsiang; Yang Kao-ping
Women	Japan; Toshimi Furuta; Keiko Hama; Takako Iida; Toyoko Iwahara; Hiroko Jinnouchi; Kajiko Kitajima; Machiko Kunitimo; Fumie Matsushita; Hisako Nagano; Aiko Onozawa; Takako Shirai; Eiko Sugawara	South Korea; Choi Duk-kyung; Jo Hea-jung; Kang Mi-hwa; Kim Hei-sook; Kim Young-ja; Lee In-sook; Lee Kyung-sun; Lee Soon-bok; Suh Han-sook; Suh Hyun-sook; Yang Jin-soo; Yoon Young-nae	Khmer Republic; Chan Leang Chhiv; Chau Chan; Chhouk Vanna; Eap Sodanep; Pao Yoeun; Ten Sem; Tep Kim Heng; Vor Onn

== Medal table ==
Rank	Nation	Gold	Silver	Bronze	Total
1	Japan (JPN)	2	0	0	2
2	South Korea (KOR)	0	2	0	2
3	Khmer Republic (KHM)	0	0	1	1
3	Republic of China (ROC)	0	0	1	1
Totals (4 entries)		2	2	2	6

== Results ==
=== Men ===
Date		Score		Set 1	Set 2	Set 3	Set 4	Set 5	Total
10 Dec	Iran	0–3	South Korea	7–15	5–15	1–15			10–45
10 Dec	Japan	3–0	Khmer Republic	15-12	15-5	15-5			45-22
10 Dec	Republic of China	3–0	Pakistan	15-10	15-0	15-2			45-12
10 Dec	Thailand	0–3	Indonesia						
11 Dec	Pakistan	0–3	Japan	3–15	3–15	5–15			11–45
11 Dec	Thailand	1–3	Iran	2–15	5–15	15–12	13–15		35–57
11 Dec	Indonesia	0–3	South Korea	4-15	2-15	2-15			8-45
11 Dec	Khmer Republic	0–3	Republic of China						
12 Dec	South Korea	3–0	Thailand	15-2	15-5	15-2			45-9
12 Dec	Japan	3–0	Republic of China						
12 Dec	Indonesia	0–3	Iran	2–15	5–15	3–15			10–45
12 Dec	Khmer Republic	3–0	Pakistan						
13 Dec	Republic of China	3–0	Indonesia						
13 Dec	Iran	0–3	Japan	12–15	5–15	3–15			20–45
13 Dec	South Korea	3–0	Khmer Republic	15-12	15-2	15-9			45-23
14 Dec	Khmer Republic	3–0	Thailand	15-6	15-10	15-6			45-26
14 Dec	Japan	3–0	Indonesia	15-1	15-1	15-4			45-6
14 Dec	South Korea	3–0	Pakistan	15-10	15-3	15-3			45-16
15 Dec	Pakistan	1–3	Iran	11–15	7–15	15–13	0–15		33–58
15 Dec	Republic of China	1–3	South Korea	12-15	16-14	12-15	7-15		47-59
15 Dec	Thailand	0–3	Japan						
16 Dec	Republic of China	3–0	Thailand						
16 Dec	Indonesia	3–1	Pakistan	15-12	15-7	11-15	15-6		56-40
16 Dec	Iran	2–3	Khmer Republic	9–15	15–13	1–15	15–5	13–15	53–63
18 Dec	Iran	0–3	Republic of China	4–15	12–15	8–15			24–45
18 Dec	Indonesia	0–3	Khmer Republic						
19 Dec	Pakistan	3–0	Thailand						
19 Dec	Japan	3–0	South Korea	15–6	15–4	15–5			45–15

=== Women ===
Date		Score		Set 1	Set 2	Set 3	Set 4	Set 5	Total
10 Dec	Thailand	2–3	Indonesia	15-9	15-10	4-15	8-15	8-15	50-64
10 Dec	Iran	0–3	South Korea	1–15	2–15	2–15			5–45
10 Dec	Japan	3–0	Khmer Republic	15-1	15-1	15-0			45-2
10 Dec	Republic of China	3–0	Philippines						
11 Dec	Khmer Republic	3–2	Republic of China	14-16	15-13	13-15	15-10	15-9	72-63
11 Dec	Philippines	0–3	Japan	15-2	15-3	15-1			45-6
11 Dec	Thailand	0–3	Iran	3–15	0–15	6–15			9–45
11 Dec	Indonesia	0–3	South Korea	1-15	6-15	6-15			13-45
12 Dec	Khmer Republic	3–0	Philippines	15-7	15-10	15-5			45-22
12 Dec	South Korea	3–0	Thailand	15-0	15-1	15-1			45–2
12 Dec	Japan	3–0	Republic of China	15-3	15-10	15-0			45-13
12 Dec	Indonesia	1–3	Iran	9–15	15–9	5–15	2–15		31–54
13 Dec	South Korea	3–0	Khmer Republic	15-4	15-6	15-3			45-13
13 Dec	Republic of China	3–0	Indonesia						
13 Dec	Iran	0–3	Japan	7–15	3–15	1–15			11–45
14 Dec	Japan	3–0	Indonesia	15-1	15-1	15-2			45-4
14 Dec	Khmer Republic	3–0	Thailand	15-13	15-10	15-7			45-30
14 Dec	South Korea	3–0	Philippines						
15 Dec	Thailand	0–3	Japan	1–15	0–15	0–15			1–45
15 Dec	Philippines	0–3	Iran	8–15	10–15	10–15			28–45
15 Dec	Republic of China	0–3	South Korea	4–15	5–15	0–15			9–45
16 Dec	Iran	0–3	Khmer Republic	7–15	9–15	0–15			16–45
16 Dec	Republic of China	3–0	Thailand						
16 Dec	Indonesia	0–3	Philippines	6-15	7-15	8-15			21-45
18 Dec	Indonesia	0–3	Khmer Republic	1–15	5–15	7–15			15–45
18 Dec	Iran	3–2	Republic of China	16–14	9–15	10–15	15–12	15–12	65–68
19 Dec	Philippines	3–0	Thailand						
19 Dec	Japan	3–1	South Korea	15-4	15-12	13-15	15-9		58-40

== Final Standing ==
=== Men ===
Rank	Team
1st place, gold medalist(s)	Japan
2nd place, silver medalist(s)	South Korea
3rd place, bronze medalist(s)	Republic of China
4	Cambodia
5	Iran
6	Indonesia
7	Pakistan
8	Thailand

=== Women ===
Rank	Team
1st place, gold medalist(s)	Japan
2nd place, silver medalist(s)	South Korea
3rd place, bronze medalist(s)	Cambodia
4	Iran
5	Republic of China
6	Philippines
7	Indonesia
8	Thailand
