= Albert le Tyrant =

French archer (born 1946)

Personal information
- Nationality: French
- Born: 12 September 1946 (age 78)

Sport
- Sport: Archery

Albert le Tyrant (born 12 September 1946) is a French archer. He competed in the men's individual event at the 1976 Summer Olympics.
