= Mariko Yoshida (volleyball) =

Japanese volleyball player (born 1954)

Personal information
- Born: 27 July 1954 (age 72)
- Height: 1.75 m (5 ft 9 in)

Volleyball information
- Position: Outside hitter
- Number: 9

National team
1976–1978	Japan
Honours
Women's volleyball
Representing Japan
Olympic Games
Gold medal – first place	1976 Montreal	Team
World Championship
Silver medal – second place	1978 Soviet Union	Team
FIVB World Cup
Gold medal – first place	1977 Japan	Team

Mariko Yoshida (吉田 真理子, Yoshida Mariko) (born 27 July 1954) is a Japanese volleyball player and Olympic champion.

Yoshida was a member of the Japanese winning team at the 1976 Olympic Games.
