= Jutta Höhne =

German fencer

Personal information
- Born: 26 March 1951 (age 75) Gelsenkirchen, Germany
- Height: 1.66 m (5 ft 5 in)
- Weight: 63 kg (139 lb)

Sport
- Sport: Fencing
- Club: KSC Koblenz
Medal record
Representing West Germany
World Fencing Championships
Bronze medal – third place	1979 Melbourne	Team foil

Jutta Höhne (born Popken on 26 March 1951) is a retired German fencer. She competed in the team foil event at the 1976 Summer Olympics and finished in fourth place. Her foil team won the bronze medal at the 1979 World Fencing Championships.
