= Marie-Paule Van Eyck =

Belgian fencer

Personal information
- Born: 22 June 1951 (age 75) Frameries, Hainaut, Belgium

Sport
- Sport: Fencing

Marie-Paule Van Eyck (born 22 June 1951) is a Belgian fencer. She competed in the women's individual foil event at the 1976 Summer Olympics. Her daughter, Émilie Heymans, was also an Olympic athlete representing Canada in diving.
