= Dinorah Enríquez =

Puerto Rican fencer

Personal information
- Born: 19 January 1947 Fajardo, Puerto Rico
- Died: 14 March 1998 (aged 51) Boston, Massachusetts

Sport
- Sport: Fencing

Dinorah Enríquez (19 January 1947 – 14 March 1998) was a Puerto Rican fencer. She competed in the women's individual foil event at the 1976 Summer Olympics. She also won a bronze medal at the 1982 Central American and Caribbean Games in the team foil event.
