= Maria Consolata Collino =

Italian fencer (born 1947)

Personal information
- Born: 9 December 1947 (age 78) Turin, Italy

Sport
- Sport: Fencing
Medal record
Women's fencing
Representing Italy
Olympic Games
Silver medal – second place	1976 Montréal	Foil, individual

Maria Consolata Collino (born 9 December 1947) is an Italian fencer. She won a silver medal in the women's individual foil event at the 1976 Summer Olympics.
