= Christine Muzio =

French fencer (1951–2018)

Personal information
- Born: 10 May 1951 Creil, France
- Died: 29 November 2018 (aged 67)

Sport
- Sport: Fencing
Medal record
Women's fencing
Representing France
Olympic Games
Gold medal – first place	1980 Moscow	Foil, women's team
Silver medal – second place	1976 Montreal	Foil, women's team

Christine Muzio (10 May 1951 – 29 November 2018) was a French fencer. She won a silver medal in the women's team foil event at the 1976 Summer Olympics and a gold in the same event at the 1980 Summer Olympics.
