= Doriana Pigliapoco =

Italian fencer (born 1957)

Personal information
- Born: 25 November 1957 (age 68)

Sport
- Sport: Fencing

Doriana Pigliapoco (born 25 November 1957) is an Italian fencer. She competed in the women's team foil event at the 1976 Summer Olympics.
