= Shoji Uchida =

Japanese modern pentathlete

Personal information
- Born: 25 June 1949 (age 77)

Sport
- Sport: Modern pentathlon

Shoji Uchida (内田 正二, Uchida Shōji; born 25 June 1949) is a Japanese modern pentathlete. He competed at the 1976 and 1984 Summer Olympics.
