= Micheline Borghs =

Belgian fencer

Personal information
- Born: 17 May 1956 (age 70) Antwerp, Belgium

Sport
- Sport: Fencing

Micheline Borghs (born 17 May 1956) is a Belgian fencer. She competed in the women's individual foil events at the 1976 and 1980 Summer Olympics.
