= Olga Knyazeva =

Soviet fencer (1954–2015)

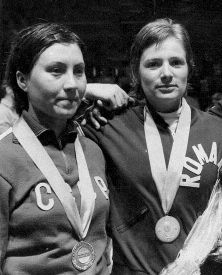
- Knyazeva (left) at the 1975 World Championships

Personal information
- Born: 9 August 1954 Kazan, Russian SFSR, Soviet Union
- Died: 3 January 2015 (aged 60) Kazan, Russia
- Height: 164 cm (5 ft 5 in)
- Weight: 62 kg (137 lb)

Sport
- Sport: Fencing
- Event: Foil
- Club: Dynamo Kazan
Medal record
Representing Soviet Union
Olympic Games
Gold medal – first place	1976 Montréal	Team foil
World Championships
Silver medal – second place	1973 Gothenburg	Team foil
Gold medal – first place	1974 Grenoble	Team foil
Gold medal – first place	1975 Budapest	Team foil
Silver medal – second place	1975 Budapest	Foil
Gold medal – first place	1977 Buenos Aires	Team foil
Gold medal – first place	1978 Hamburg	Team foil

Olga Nikolaevna Knyazeva (Russian: Ольга Николаевна Князева; 9 August 1954 – 3 January 2015) was a Soviet foil fencer. She won a team gold medal at the 1976 Olympics and placed ninth individually. She also won four gold and two silver medals at the world championships between 1973 and 1978.

Knyazeva took up fencing in 1966 and between 1972 and 1978, was a member of the Soviet national team. In 1975 she won the World Cup, the European Team Cup, and the team world title, and was named best female fencer of the year by the Fédération Internationale d'Escrime. After retiring from competitions she worked as a fencing coach in Kazan and taught physical education at the Kazan State Finance and Economics Institute.

After the 1976 Olympics Knyazeva married Rafael Dubov, who was her childhood friend, a fellow fencer, and later a fencing coach and referee. Their children, son Aleksandr and daughter Nina, also competed in fencing.
