= 1977 FIVB Volleyball Women's World Cup =

1977 Women's World Cup
Tournament details
- Host country: Japan
- Dates: 8–15 November
- Teams: 8
- Venue: (in 6 host cities)

Final positions
- Champions: Japan (1st title)

The 1977 FIVB Women's World Cup was held from 8 to 15 November 1977 in Japan.

== Teams ==
Teams	Continents
Japan	Host country
China	Asia
South Korea	Asia
Soviet Union	Europe
Hungary	Europe
Cuba	Americas
United States	Americas
Peru	Americas

== Results ==
=== First round ===
==== Pool A ====
Pos	Team	Pld	W	L	Pts	SW	SL	SR	SPW	SPL	SPR	Qualification
1	China	3	3	0	6	9	3	3.000	166	116	1.431	Semifinals
2	Japan	3	2	1	5	8	3	2.667	154	105	1.467	Semifinals
3	United States	3	1	2	4	4	8	0.500	122	167	0.731	5th–8th place
4	Hungary	3	0	3	3	2	9	0.222	106	160	0.663	5th–8th place

Date		Score		Set 1	Set 2	Set 3	Set 4	Set 5	Total
7 Nov	China	3–1	United States	15–11	15–3	12–15	15–2		57–31
7 Nov	Japan	3–0	Hungary	15–6	15–7	15–7			45–20
8 Nov	China	3–0	Hungary	15–10	15–5	15–6			45–21
8 Nov	Japan	3–0	United States	15–2	15–6	15–13			45–21
10 Nov	United States	3–2	Hungary	15–10	10–15	14–16	16–14	15–10	70–65
10 Nov	China	3–2	Japan	8–15	15–12	15–9	11–15	15–13	64–64

==== Pool B ====
Pos	Team	Pld	W	L	Pts	SW	SL	SR	SPW	SPL	SPR	Qualification
1	South Korea	3	3	0	6	9	4	2.250	177	145	1.221	Semifinals
2	Cuba	3	2	1	5	8	4	2.000	169	125	1.352	Semifinals
3	Peru	3	1	2	4	6	6	1.000	139	131	1.061	5th–8th place
4	Soviet Union	3	0	3	3	0	9	0.000	51	135	0.378	5th–8th place

Date		Score		Set 1	Set 2	Set 3	Set 4	Set 5	Total
7 Nov	Peru	3–0	Soviet Union	15–4	15–1	15–6			45–11
7 Nov	South Korea	3–2	Cuba	15–11	13–15	6–15	15–12	18–16	67–69
8 Nov	Cuba	3–0	Soviet Union	15–6	15–5	15–9			45–20
8 Nov	South Korea	3–2	Peru	15–11	15–4	10–15	10–15	15–11	65–56
10 Nov	South Korea	3–0	Soviet Union	15–8	15–8	15–4			45–20
10 Nov	Cuba	3–1	Peru	15–6	10–15	15–10	15–7		55–38

=== Final round ===
==== 5th–8th places ====
Pos	Team	Pld	W	L	Pts	SW	SL	SR	SPW	SPL	SPR
5	Peru	3	3	0	6	9	2	4.500	162	97	1.670
6	Hungary	3	2	1	5	6	4	1.500	129	120	1.075
7	United States	3	1	2	4	6	7	0.857	155	175	0.886
8	Soviet Union	3	0	3	3	1	9	0.111	93	147	0.633

Date		Score		Set 1	Set 2	Set 3	Set 4	Set 5	Total
12 Nov	Peru	3–0	Hungary	15–11	15–8	15–9			45–28
12 Nov	United States	3–1	Soviet Union	15–12	12–15	15–13	15–7		57–47
13 Nov	Hungary	3–1	United States	7–15	18–16	16–14	15–2		56–47
13 Nov	Peru	3–0	Soviet Union	15–10	15–2	15–6			45–18
14 Nov	Hungary	3–0	Soviet Union	15–11	15–8	15–9			45–28
14 Nov	Peru	3–2	United States	12–15	13–15	15–4	15–2	17–15	72–51

==== Final places ====
Location: Osaka

Pos	Team	Pld	W	L	Pts	SW	SL	SR	SPW	SPL	SPR
1	Japan	3	3	0	6	9	2	4.500	157	99	1.586
2	Cuba	3	1	2	4	5	6	0.833	124	132	0.939
3	South Korea	3	1	2	4	4	6	0.667	113	136	0.831
4	China	3	1	2	4	4	8	0.500	136	163	0.834

Date		Score		Set 1	Set 2	Set 3	Set 4	Set 5	Total
13 Nov	Japan	3–0	Cuba	15–1	15–9	15–10			45–20
13 Nov	South Korea	3–0	China	15–12	15–9	17–15			47–36
14 Nov	Cuba	3–0	South Korea	15–7	16–14	15–3			46–24
14 Nov	Japan	3–1	China	15–4	15–9	13–15	15–9		58–37
15 Nov	China	3–2	Cuba	6–15	15–6	12–15	15–13	15–9	63–58
15 Nov	Japan	3–1	South Korea	15–6	15–11	9–15	15–10		54–42

== Final standing ==
Rank	Team
1st place, gold medalist(s)	Japan
2nd place, silver medalist(s)	Cuba
3rd place, bronze medalist(s)	South Korea
4	China
5	Peru
6	Hungary
7	United States
8	Soviet Union

1977 Women's World Cup champions

Japan
1st title

Team roster
Takako Shirai, Noriko Matsuda, Yumi Egami, Echiko Maeda, Yuko Arakida, Katsuko Kanesaka, Juri Yokoyama, Hiromi Yano, Mariko Yoshida, Kayoko Sudo, Shoko Takayanagi, Rieko Mizuhara
Head coach
Shigeo Yamada

== Awards ==
- Most valuable player
  (Japan) Takako Shirai
- Best attacker
  (Cuba) Mercedes Pomares
- Best blocker
  (China) Cao Huiying
- Best setter
  (Japan) Noriko Matsuda
- Best server
  (Japan) Yumi Egami
- Best defender
  (South Korea) Jo Hea-jung
- Best Coach
  (Japan) Shigeo Yamada
- Spirit of fight
  (China) Cao Huiying
