= Véronique Trinquet =

French fencer (born 1956)

Personal information
- Born: 15 June 1956 (age 70) Marseille, France

Sport
- Sport: Fencing
Medal record
Women's fencing
Representing France
Olympic Games
Silver medal – second place	1976 Montreal	Team foil
Summer Universiade
Bronze medal – third place	1977 Sofia	Team foil

Véronique Trinquet (born 15 June 1956) is a French fencer. She won a silver medal in the women's team foil event at the 1976 Summer Olympics.

Her younger sister Pascale Trinquet is also a former fencer and Olympic medalist. Véronique and Pascale are the daughters of a Saint-Tropez retail pharmacist, and after their sporting career was over, they owned a pharmacy in Paris 16th arrondissement.
