= Kazuko Kadoya =

Japanese basketball player

Personal information
- Nationality: Japanese
- Born: 7 October 1953 (age 71); Matsuyama, Japan

Sport
- Sport: Basketball

Kazuko Kadoya (門屋 加壽子, Kadoya Kazuko; born 7 October 1953) is a Japanese basketball player. She competed in the women's tournament at the 1976 Summer Olympics.
