= Grażyna Staszak-Makowska =

Polish fencer

Personal information
- Born: 1 November 1953 (age 72) Bydgoszcz, Poland

Sport
- Sport: Fencing

Grażyna Staszak-Makowska (born 1 November 1953) is a Polish fencer. She competed in the women's individual and team foil events at the 1976 Summer Olympics.
