= Donna Hennyey =

Canadian fencer (born 1942)

Personal information
- Born: 10 April 1942 (age 84) New York City, New York, US

Sport
- Sport: Fencing

Donna Hennyey (born 10 April 1942) is a Canadian fencer. She competed at the 1972 and 1976 Summer Olympics.

As of April 2012 she was an instructor at the University of Toronto Faculty of Dentistry, teaching nutrition.
