= Milady Tack-Fang =

Cuban fencer (born 1949)

Personal information
- Born: 28 July 1949 (age 76) Oriente, Cuba

Sport
- Sport: Fencing

Milady Tack-Fang (born 28 July 1949) is a Cuban foil fencer. She competed at the 1968 and 1976 Summer Olympics.
