= Katsumi Oda =

Japanese volleyball player (born 1952)

Personal information
- Nationality: Japanese
- Born: 6 May 1952 (age 73); Tanba, Japan

Sport
- Sport: Volleyball

Katsumi Oda (小田 勝美, Oda Katsumi; born 6 May 1952) is a Japanese volleyball player. He competed in the men's tournament at the 1976 Summer Olympics in Montreal, Canada.
