= Teruko Miyamoto =

Japanese basketball player (born 1952)

Personal information
- Nationality: Japanese
- Born: 31 May 1952 (age 73); Kumamoto, Japan

Sport
- Sport: Basketball

Teruko Miyamoto (宮本 輝子, Miyamoto Teruko; born 31 May 1952) is a Japanese basketball player. She competed in the women's tournament at the 1976 Summer Olympics.
