= Wendy Ager-Grant =

British fencer

Personal information
- Born: 2 July 1953 (age 73)

Sport
- Sport: Fencing

Wendy Caroline Ager-Grant (born 2 July 1953) is a British foil fencer. She competed at the 1976 and 1980 Summer Olympics.
