= Juri Yokoyama =

Japanese volleyball player

Personal information
- Born: 9 March 1955 (age 71); Kitakyushu, Fukuoka, Japan
- Height: 1.74 m (5 ft 9 in)

Volleyball information
- Position: Opposite
- Number: 12

National team
1974-1982	Japan
Honours
Women's volleyball
Representing Japan
Olympic Games
Gold medal – first place	1976 Montreal	Team
World Championship
Gold medal – first place	1974 Mexico
Silver medal – second place	1978 Soviet Union
FIVB World Cup
Gold medal – first place	1977 Japan
Silver medal – second place	1981 Japan
Asian Games
Gold medal – first place	1974 Tehran	Team
Gold medal – first place	1978 Bangkok	Team

Juri Yokoyama (横山 樹理 Yokoyama Juri, born 9 March 1955) is a former volleyball player from Japan, who was a member of the Japan Women's National Team that won the gold medal at the 1976 Summer Olympics in Montreal.

== National team ==
- 1974: 1st place in the World Championship
- 1976: 1st place in the Olympic Games of Montreal
- 1978: 2nd place in the World Championship
- 1982: 4th place in the World Championship
