= Carola Mangiarotti =

Italian fencer (born 1952)

Personal information
- Born: 2 May 1952 (age 74) Milan, Italy

Sport
- Sport: Fencing
Medal record
Mediterranean Games
Bronze medal – third place	1975 Algiers	Individual foil

Carola Mangiarotti (born 2 May 1952) is an Italian fencer. She competed at the 1976 and 1980 Summer Olympics. She won a bronze medal in the individual foil event at the 1975 Mediterranean Games. Her father is Italian fencer Edoardo Mangiarotti.
