= Krystyna Machnicka-Urbańska =

Polish fencer

Personal information
- Born: 13 March 1947 (age 79) Katowice, Poland

Sport
- Sport: Fencing

Krystyna Machnicka-Urbańska (born 13 March 1947) is a Polish fencer. She competed at the 1972 and 1976 Summer Olympics.
