= Susan Wrigglesworth =

British fencer (1954–1996)

Personal information
- Born: 16 September 1954 Westminster, London, England
- Died: 17 March 1996 (aged 41) Hendon, London, England
- Spouse: Ziemowit Wojciechowski

Sport
- Sport: Fencing

Susan Wrigglesworth (16 September 1954 – 17 March 1996), whose married name was Susan Wojciechowski, was the youngest female foilist in the history of British fencing to compete in the Olympic Games. She attended Croydon High School and, at the age of 17, competed in the 1972 Summer Olympics in Munich. She reached the World Youth final and came 13th in the individual event in the 1976 Summer Olympics in Montreal. Four years later she competed in the 1980 Summer Olympics in Moscow. She was married to Polish Olympic fencer Ziemowit Wojciechowski.
