= Shoko Takayanagi =

Japanese volleyball player (born 1954)

Personal information
- Full name: Shoko Takayanagi (-Yoshida)
- Born: 13 September 1954 (age 72)
- Height: 1.70 m (5 ft 7 in)

Volleyball information
- Position: Outside hitter
- Number: 10

National team
1976–1978	Japan
Honours
Women's volleyball
Representing Japan
Olympic Games
Gold medal – first place	1976 Montreal	Team
World Championship
Silver medal – second place	1978 Soviet Union	Team
FIVB World Cup
Gold medal – first place	1977 Japan	Team

Shoko Takayanagi (高柳 昌子, Takayanagi Shōko) (born 13 September 1954) is a Japanese volleyball player and Olympic champion.

Takayanagi was a member of the Japanese winning team at the 1976 Olympic games.
