= Brigitte Oertel =

German fencer (born 1953)

Personal information
- Born: 11 October 1953 (age 72) Braunweiler, West Germany
- Height: 1.58 m (5 ft 2 in)
- Weight: 48 kg (106 lb)

Sport
- Sport: Fencing
- Club: KSC Koblenz
Medal record
Representing West Germany
World Fencing Championships
Silver medal – second place	1977 Buenos Aires	Team foil

Brigitte Oertel (born 11 October 1953) is a German fencer who competed at the 1972 and 1976 Summer Olympics; in 1976, she finished in 18th and fourth place in the individual and team foil events, respectively. She won a silver medal in the team foil at the 1977 World Fencing Championships.
