= Susan Stewart (fencer) =

Canadian fencer (born 1946)

Personal information
- Born: 26 July 1946 (age 79) Montreal, Quebec, Canada

Sport
- Sport: Fencing

Susan Stewart (born 26 July 1946) is a Canadian fencer. She competed in the women's individual and team foil events at the 1976 Summer Olympics.
