= Claudette Herbster-Josland =

French fencer (born 1946)

Personal information
- Born: 28 March 1946 (age 80) Dijon, France

Sport
- Sport: Fencing
Medal record
Women's fencing
Representing France
Olympic Games
Silver medal – second place	1976 Montréal	Team foil
Mediterranean Games
Gold medal – first place	1975 Algiers	Individual foil

Claudette Herbster-Josland (born 28 March 1946) is a French fencer. She won a silver medal in the women's team foil event at the 1972 Summer Olympics and a gold medal in the individual foil event at the 1975 Mediterranean Games.
