= Jila Almasi =

Iranian fencer

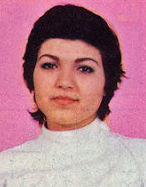
- Almasi in 1974

Personal information
- Born: 15 July 1954 (age 71) Kermanshah, Iran

Sport
- Sport: Fencing
Medal record
Women's fencing
Representing Iran
Asian Games
Gold medal – first place	1974 Tehran	Team foil

Jila Almasi (Persian: ژیلا الماسی; born 15 July 1954) is an Iranian fencer. She competed in the women's individual and team foil events at the 1976 Summer Olympics.

== See also ==
- List of Asian Games medalists in fencing
