= Kimi Wakitashiro =

Japanese basketball player

Personal information
- Nationality: Japanese
- Born: 4 November 1950 (age 74); Miyazaki, Japan

Sport
- Sport: Basketball

Kimi Wakitashiro (脇田代 喜美, Wakitashiro Kimi; born 4 November 1950) is a Japanese basketball player. She competed in the women's tournament at the 1976 Summer Olympics.
