= Yasunori Yasuda =

Japanese volleyball player (born 1952)

Personal information
- Nationality: Japanese
- Born: 20 November 1952 (age 72); Minamiashigara, Kanagawa, Japan

Sport
- Sport: Volleyball

Yasunori Yasuda (保田 靖則, Yasuda Yasunori; born 20 November 1952) is a Japanese volleyball player. He competed in the men's tournament at the 1976 Summer Olympics.
