= Magdalena Bartoș =

Romanian fencer

Personal information
- Born: 23 July 1954 (age 71) Bucharest, Romania

Sport
- Sport: Fencing

Magdalena Bartoș (born 23 July 1954) is a Romanian fencer. She competed in the women's individual and team foil events at the 1976 Summer Olympics.
