= Brigitte Gapais-Dumont =

French fencer (1944–2018)

Personal information
- Born: 25 April 1944 Saint-Fargeau, France
- Died: 29 November 2018 (aged 74) Concarneau, France

Sport
- Sport: Fencing
Medal record
Women's fencing
Representing France
Olympic Games
| Silver medal – second place | 1976 Montreal | Team foil |
World Championships
| Bronze medal – third place | 1966 Moscow | Team foil |
| Bronze medal – third place | 1970 Ankara | Team foil |
Mediterranean Games
| Silver medal – second place | 1975 Algiers | Individual foil |
Summer Universiade
| Gold medal – first place | 1963 Porto Alegre | Team foil |
| Gold medal – first place | 1965 Budapest | Individual foil |
| Bronze medal – third place | 1965 Budapest | Team foil |

Brigitte Gapais-Dumont (25 April 1944 – 29 November 2018) was a French fencer. She won silver medals in the women's individual foil event at the 1975 Mediterranean Games and in the team foil event at the 1976 Summer Olympics.

== Career ==
Brigitte Gapais-Dumont competed in the foil events at four consecutive Olympic Games. At the 1964 Tokyo Games, she was eliminated in the individual qualifying rounds and finished sixth in the team competition. During the 1968 Mexico City Games, she placed fourth in both the individual and team events. She followed this with a sixth-place finish in the team event at the 1972 Munich Games. At her final Olympics, the 1976 Montreal Games, she placed fourth individually and won the silver medal in the team foil event.

Beyond her competitive career, Gapais-Dumont held significant leadership roles in sports administration. From 1976 to 1981, she served as the Vice-President of the French National Olympic and Sports Committee (CNOSF). She also served as the Secretary General of the French Fencing Federation for 16 years.
