= Kimiko Hashimoto =

Japanese basketball player (born 1953)

Personal information
- Nationality: Japanese
- Born: 17 February 1953 (age 72); Chiba, Japan

Sport
- Sport: Basketball

Kimiko Hashimoto (橋本 きみ子, Hashimoto Kimiko; born 17 February 1953) is a Japanese basketball player. She competed in the women's tournament at the 1976 Summer Olympics.
