= Nancy Uranga =

Cuban fencer (1954–1976)

Personal information
- Full name: Nancy Uranga Ramagoza
- Born: 17 August 1954 Bahía Honda, Cuba
- Died: 6 October 1976 (aged 22) Bridgetown, Barbados

Sport
- Sport: Fencing

Nancy Uranga Ramagoza (17 August 1954 – 6 October 1976) was a Cuban fencer. She competed in the women's individual and team foil events at the 1976 Summer Olympics. She was one of the passengers on board Cubana Flight 455, which was destroyed by a bomb set by Cuban exiles, killing everyone aboard.
