= Takako Iida =

Japanese volleyball player

Personal information
- Born: 3 February 1946 (age 80); Yatomi, Aichi, Japan
- Height: 1.74 m (5 ft 9 in)

Volleyball information
- Position: Middle blocker
- Number: 5 (1972); 1 (1976)

National team
1966–1976	Japan
Honours
Women's volleyball
Representing Japan
Olympic Games
Gold medal – first place	1976 Montreal	Team
Silver medal – second place	1972 Munich	Team
World Championship
Gold medal – first place	1974 Mexico	Team
Silver medal – second place	1970 Bulgaria	Team
Asian Games
Gold medal – first place	1966 Bangkok	Team
Gold medal – first place	1970 Bangkok	Team
Gold medal – first place	1974 Tehran	Team

Takako Iida (飯田 高子, Iida Takako) (born 3 February 1946, in Yatomi, Aichi, Japan) is a Japanese former volleyball player and Olympic champion.

Iida was a member of the Japanese team that won the gold medal at the 1976 Olympic Games.
