= Sachiyo Yamamoto =

Japanese basketball player

Personal information
- Nationality: Japanese
- Born: 4 August 1950 (age 74); Hyogo, Japan

Sport
- Sport: Basketball

Sachiyo Yamamoto (山本 幸代, Yamamoto Sachiyo; born 4 August 1950) is a Japanese basketball player. She competed in the women's tournament at the 1976 Summer Olympics.
