= Takako Shirai (volleyball) =

Japanese volleyball player

Personal information
- Full name: Takako Shirai (-Takagi)
- Born: Yoon Jeong-soon (윤정순); 18 July 1952 (age 74); Okayama, Okayama, Japan
- Height: 1.80 m (5 ft 11 in)

Volleyball information
- Position: Outside hitter
- Number: 8 (1972); 5 (1976)

National team
1970–1977	Japan
Honours
Women's volleyball
Representing Japan
Olympic Games
Silver medal – second place	1972 Munich	Team
Gold medal – first place	1976 Montreal	Team
World Championship
Gold medal – first place	1974 Mexico
FIVB World Cup
Gold medal – first place	1977 Japan
Asian Games
Gold medal – first place	1970 Bangkok	Team
Gold medal – first place	1974 Tehran	Team

Takako Shirai (白井貴子 Shirai Takako, Korean: 윤정순, Hanja: 尹貞順, Yoon Jeong-soon) is a Japanese former volleyball player of Korean ancestry. She is a two-time Olympian who was a member of the Japanese women's national volleyball team that won the gold medal at the 1976 Summer Olympics in Montreal. Shirai also helped Japan win the silver medal at the 1972 Summer Olympics in Munich. She was an outside hitter.

Shirai became a key player in the rise of the Japanese women in the 1970s. She helped the Japanese women secure a gold medal at the 1974 FIVB World Championship in Mexico. She was also key in Japan's gold medal win at the 1977 FIVB World Cup in Japan.

In 2000, Shirai became an inductee of the International Volleyball Hall of Fame in Holyoke, Massachusetts.

== National team ==
- 1972 — 2nd place in the Olympic Games of Munich
- 1974 — 1st place in the World Championship
- 1976 — 1st place in the Olympic Games of Montreal
