= Kiyomi Kato (volleyball) =

Japanese volleyball player (born 1953)

Personal information
- Full name: Kiyomi Kato (-Nakamura)
- Born: 9 March 1953 (age 73); Ibaraki, Japan
- Height: 1.80 m (5 ft 11 in)

Volleyball information
- Number: 6
Honours
Women's volleyball
Representing Japan
Olympic Games
Gold medal – first place	1976 Montreal	Team
World Championship
Gold medal – first place	1974 Mexico	Team

Kiyomi Kato (加藤きよみ, Katō Kiyomi) (born 9 March 1953) is a Japanese volleyball player and Olympic champion.

Kato was a member of the Japanese winning team at the 1976 Olympic games.

== Personal life ==
Kato was born in Ibaraki Prefecture on 9 March 1953.
