= Noriko Matsuda =

Japanese volleyball player (born 1952)

Personal information
- Born: 5 March 1952 (age 74); Kushiro, Hokkaido, Japan
- Height: 1.69 m (5 ft 7 in)

Volleyball information
- Position: Setter
- Number: 4

National team
1974–1977	Japan
Honours
Women's volleyball
Representing Japan
Olympic Games
Gold medal – first place	1976 Montreal	Team
World Championship
Gold medal – first place	1974 Mexico	Team
FIVB World Cup
Gold medal – first place	1977 Japan	Team

Noriko Matsuda (松田紀子, Matsuda Noriko) (born 5 March 1952) is a Japanese volleyball player and Olympic champion.

She was a member of the Japanese winning team at the 1976 Olympic games.
