= Echiko Maeda =

Japanese volleyball player (born 1952)

Personal information
- Full name: Echiko Maeda (-Tamura)
- Born: 31 January 1952 (age 74); Tokyo, Japan
- Height: 1.75 m (5 ft 9 in)

Volleyball information
- Number: 3

National team
1974–1977	Japan
Honours
Women's volleyball
Representing Japan
Olympic Games
Gold medal – first place	1976 Montreal	Team
FIVB World Cup
Gold medal – first place	1977 Japan	Team

Echiko Maeda (前田 悦智子, Maeda Echiko) (born 31 January 1952) is a Japanese volleyball player and Olympic champion.

Maeda was a member of the Japanese gold medal winning team at the 1976 Olympic games.
