= Hideko Oka =

Japanese fencer

Personal information
- Born: 14 February 1953 (age 73)

Sport
- Sport: Fencing

Hideko Oka (岡 秀子, Oka Hideko; born 14 February 1953) is a Japanese fencer. She competed in the women's individual and team foil events at the 1976 Summer Olympics.
