= Sheila Armstrong (fencer) =

American fencer (1949–2010)

Personal information
- Born: November 26, 1949 Upland, California, United States
- Died: May 18, 2010 (aged 60) Los Angeles, California, United States

Sport
- Sport: Fencing

Sheila Armstrong (November 26, 1949 – May 18, 2010) was an American fencer. She competed in the women's individual and team foil events at the 1976 Summer Olympics. She also won the women's team foil bronze medal at the 1975 Pan American Games.
