= Mariko Okamoto =

Japanese volleyball player (born 1951)

Personal information
- Full name: Mariko Okamoto (-Nakano)
- Born: 28 December 1951 (age 74)
- Height: 1.73 m (5 ft 8 in)

Volleyball information
- Number: 9 (1972); 2 (1976)

National team
1972–1976	Japan
Honours
Women's volleyball
Representing Japan
Olympic Games
Gold medal – first place	1976 Montreal	Team
Silver medal – second place	1972 Munich	Team
World Championship
Gold medal – first place	1974 Mexico	Team

Mariko Okamoto (岡本 眞理子, Okamoto Mariko) (born 28 December 1951) is a Japanese volleyball player and Olympic champion.

Okamoto was a member of the Japanese winning team at the 1976 Olympic games.
