= Reiko Aonuma =

Japanese basketball player (born 1954)

Personal information
- Nationality: Japanese
- Born: 28 January 1954 (age 71); Nagano, Japan

Sport
- Sport: Basketball

Reiko Aonuma (青沼 令子, Aonuma Reiko; born 28 January 1954) is a Japanese basketball player. She competed in the women's tournament at the 1976 Summer Olympics.
