= Mariko Yoshikawa =

Japanese fencer

Personal information
- Born: 1 November 1951 (age 74)

Sport
- Sport: Fencing

Mariko Yoshikawa (吉川 真理子, Yoshikawa Mariko; born 1 November 1951) is a Japanese fencer. She competed in the women's individual and team foil events at the 1976 Summer Olympics.
