= Hiromi Yano =

Japanese volleyball player (born 1955)

Personal information
- Full name: Hiromi Yano (-Ikeda)
- Born: 5 January 1955 (age 71)
- Height: 1.74 m (5 ft 9 in)

Volleyball information
- Number: 11

National team
1974–1978	Japan
Honours
Women's volleyball
Representing Japan
Olympic Games
Gold medal – first place	1976 Montreal	Team
World Championship
Gold medal – first place	1974 Mexico	Team
Silver medal – second place	1978 Soviet Union	Team
FIVB World Cup
Gold medal – first place	1977 Japan	Team

Hiromi Yano (矢野 広美, Yano Hiromi) (born 5 January 1955) is a Japanese volleyball player and Olympic champion.

Yano was a member of the Japanese winning team at the 1976 Olympic games.
