= Katsuko Kanesaka =

Japanese volleyball player (born 1954)

Personal information
- Born: 1 March 1954 (age 72); Ōamishirasato
- Height: 169 cm (5 ft 7 in)

Volleyball information
- Position: Setter
- Number: 8

National team
1974–1977	Japan
Honours
Women's volleyball
Representing Japan
Olympic Games
Gold medal – first place	1976 Montreal	Team
World Championship
Gold medal – first place	1974 Mexico	Team
FIVB World Cup
Gold medal – first place	1977 Japan	Team

Katsuko Kanesaka (金坂 克子, Kanesaka Katsuko) (born 1 March 1954) is a Japanese volleyball player and Olympic champion.

Kanesaka was a member of the Japanese winning team at the 1976 Olympic games.
