= Chantal Payer =

Canadian fencer

Personal information
- Born: Chantal Gilbert; 25 July 1953 (age 72) Montreal, Quebec, Canada

Sport
- Sport: Fencing

Chantal Payer (born 25 July 1953) is a Canadian fencer. She competed in the women's individual and team foil events at the 1976 Summer Olympics.
