= Yuko Arakida =

Japanese volleyball player (1954–2024)

Personal information
- Born: 14 February 1954 Tokyo, Japan
- Died: 16 September 2024 (aged 70)
- Height: 1.73 m (5 ft 8 in)

Volleyball information
- Number: 7
Medal record
Women's volleyball
Representing Japan
Olympic Games
Gold medal – first place	1976 Montreal	Team
World Championship
Gold medal – first place	1974 Mexico	Team
FIVB World Cup
Gold medal – first place	1977 Japan	Team

Yuko Arakida (荒木田 裕子, Arakida Yūko; 14 February 1954 – 16 September 2024) was a Japanese volleyball player and Olympic champion. She was later Chairwoman of Athlete's Committee of the Olympic Council of Asia (OCA).

Arakida was a member of the Japanese winning team at the 1976 Olympic Games.

In February 2012, Arakida was appointed sports director of Tokyo's bid to host the 2020 Summer Olympics.

Arakida died on 16 September 2024 at the age of 70.
