= Yukari Kajihara =

Japanese fencer (born 1953)

Personal information
- Born: 20 February 1953 (age 73)

Sport
- Sport: Fencing

Yukari Kajihara (加治原 由香里, Kajihara Yukari; born 20 February 1953) is a Japanese fencer. She competed in the women's individual and team foil events at the 1976 Summer Olympics.
