= Cuba at the 1976 Summer Olympics =

- IOC code: CUB
- NOC: Cuban Olympic Committee

in Montreal
- Competitors: 156 (132 men and 24 women) in 14 sports
- Flag bearer: Teófilo Stevenson
- Medals Ranked 8th: Gold 6 Silver 4 Bronze 3 Total 13

Summer Olympics appearances (overview)
- 1900; 1904; 1908–1920; 1924; 1928; 1932–1936; 1948; 1952; 1956; 1960; 1964; 1968; 1972; 1976; 1980; 1984–1988; 1992; 1996; 2000; 2004; 2008; 2012; 2016; 2020; 2024; 2028

Cuba competed at the 1976 Summer Olympics, held in Montreal, Quebec, Canada. 156 competitors (132 men and 24 women) took part in 76 events covering 14 sports.

== Medalists ==
=== Gold ===
- Alberto Juantorena — Athletics, Men's 400 metres
- Alberto Juantorena — Athletics, Men's 800 metres
- Jorge Hernández — Boxing, Men's Light Flyweight
- Ángel Herrera — Boxing, Men's Featherweight
- Teófilo Stevenson — Boxing, Men's Heavyweight
- Héctor Rodríguez — Judo, Men's Lightweight

=== Silver ===
- Alejandro Casañas — Athletics, Men's 110m Hurdles
- Ramón Duvalón — Boxing, Men's Flyweight
- Andrés Aldama — Boxing, Men's Light Welterweight
- Sixto Soria — Boxing, Men's Light Heavyweight

=== Bronze ===
- Rolando Garbey — Boxing, Men's Light Middleweight
- Luis Martínez — Boxing, Men's Middleweight
- Alfredo Figueredo, Victor García, Diego Lapera, Leonel Marshall Steward, Sr., Ernesto Martínez, Lorenzo Martínez, Jorge Pérez, Antonio Rodríguez, Carlos Salas, Victoriano Sarmientos, Jesús Savigne, and Raúl Virches — Volleyball, Men's Team Competition

== Athletics ==
Men's 400 metres

- Carlos Noroña
  - Heat — 48.46 (→ did not advance)

Men's 800 metres

- Alberto Juantorena
  - Heat — 1:47.15
  - Semi Final — 1:45.88
  - Final — 1:43.50 (→ Gold Medal)
- Leandro Civil
  - Heat — 1:45.88
  - Semi Final — 1:47.31 (→ did not advance)
- Luis Medina
  - Heat — 1:50.15 (→ did not advance)

Men's 1500 metres

- Luis Medina
  - Heat — 3:42.71 (→ did not advance)

Men's 4×100 metres Relay

- Francisco Gómez, Alejandro Casañas, Hermes Ramirez, and Silvio Leonard
  - Heat — 39.54s
  - Semi Final — 39.25s
  - Final — 39.01s (→ 5th place)

Men's 4×400 metres Relay

- Eddy Gutierrez, Damaso Alfonso, Carlos Alvarez, and Alberto Juantorena
  - Heat — 3:03.24
  - Final — 3:03.81 (→ 7th place)

Men's 400m Hurdles

- Damaso Alfonso
  - Heats — 50.76s
  - Semi Final — 49.84s
  - Final — 50.19s (→ 7th place)

Men's Marathon

- Rigoberto Mendoza — 2:22:43 (→ 33rd place)

Men's Long Jump

- Milan Matos
  - Qualification — 7.57m (→ did not advance)

Men's triple jump

- Pedro Pérez
  - Qualification — 16.51m
  - Qualification — 16.81m (→ 4th place)
- Armando Herrera
  - Qualification — 15.98m (→ did not advance, 19th place)

Men's High Jump

- Richard Spencer
  - Qualification — 2.05m (→ did not advance)

Men's Discus Throw

- Julián Morrinson
  - Qualification — 59.92m (→ did not advance)

Women's Shot Put

- María Elena Sarría
  - Final — 16.31 m (→ 11th place)

== Basketball ==
Men's team competition

- Preliminary round (group A):
  - Defeated Australia (111-89)
  - Lost to Canada (79-84)
  - Defeated Japan (97-56)
  - Defeated Mexico (89-75)
  - Lost to Soviet Union (72-98)
- Classification Matches:
  - 5th/8th place: Lost to Czechoslovakia (79-91)
  - 7th/8th place: Defeated Australia (92-81) → 7th place
- Team Roster
  - Juan Domecq
  - Ruperto Herrera
  - Juan Roca
  - Pedro Chappe
  - Alejandro Ortíz
  - Rafael Cañizares
  - Daniel Scott
  - Angel Padron
  - Tomás Herrera
  - Oscar Varona
  - Alejandro Urgelles
  - Felix Morales
- Head coach: Carmilo Hortega

== Boxing ==
Men's Light Flyweight (– 48 kg)

- Jorge Hernández
  1. First Round – Defeated Beyhan Fuchedzhiev (BUL), RSC-3
  2. Second Round – Defeated Zoffa Yarawi (PNG), KO-3
  3. Quarterfinals – Defeated Park Chan-Hee (KOR), 3:2
  4. Semifinals – Defeated Orlando Maldonado (PUR), 5:0
  5. Final – Defeated Li Byong-Uk (PRK), 4:1 → Gold Medal

Men's Flyweight (– 51 kg)

- Ramón Duvalón
  1. First Round — Bye
  2. Second Round — Defeated Souley Hancaradu (NIG), walkover
  3. Third Round — Defeated Toshinori Koga (JPN), 5:0
  4. Quarterfinal — Defeated Ian Clyde (CAN), 5:0
  5. Semi Final — Defeated David Torosyan (URS), DSQ-2
  6. Final — Lost to Leo Randolph (USA), 2:3 → Silver Medal

== Cycling ==
Six cyclists represented Cuba in 1976.

Individual road race

- Carlos Cardet — 4:49:01 (→ 14th place)
- Roberto Menéndez — did not finish (→ no ranking)
- Gregorio Aldo Arencibia — did not finish (→ no ranking)
- Jorge Pérez — did not finish (→ no ranking)

Team time trial

- Carlos Cardet
- Gregorio Aldo Arencibia
- Jorge Gómez
- Raúl Marcelo Vázquez

Individual pursuit

- Raúl Marcelo Vázquez — 17th place

== Fencing ==
13 fencers, 9 men and 4 women, represented Cuba in 1976.

Men's foil

- Enrique Salvat
- Jorge Garbey
- Eduardo Jhons

Men's team foil

- Eduardo Jhons, Enrique Salvat, Jorge Garbey, Pedro Hernández

Men's sabre

- Francisco de la Torre
- Manuel Ortíz
- Guzman Salazar

Men's team sabre

- Manuel Ortíz, Francisco de la Torre, Guzman Salazar, Ramón Hernández, Lazaro Mora

Women's foil

- Margarita Rodríguez
- Milady Tack-Fang
- Nancy Uranga

Women's team foil

- Milady Tack-Fang, Marlene Font, Nancy Uranga, Margarita Rodríguez

== Judo ==
Men's Lightweight

- Héctor Rodríguez

Men's Half-Heavyweight

- José Ibañez

Men's Open Class

- José Ibañez

== Volleyball ==
Men's team competition

- Preliminary round (group A)
  - Defeated Czechoslovakia (3-1)
  - Lost to Poland (2-3)
  - Defeated South Korea (3-0)
  - Defeated Canada (3-0)
- Semi Finals
  - Lost to Soviet Union (0-3)
- Bronze Medal Match
  - Defeated Japan (3-0) → Bronze Medal
- Team Roster
  - Leonel Marshall Steward, Sr.
  - Victoriano Sarmientos
  - Ernesto Martínez
  - Victor García
  - Carlos Salas
  - Raúl Vilches
  - Jesús Savigne
  - Lorenzo Martínez
  - Diego Lapera
  - Antonio Rodríguez
  - Alfredo Figueredo
  - Jorge Pérez
- Head coach: Herrera Idolo

Women's team competition

- Preliminary round (group B)
  - Defeated East Germany (3-1)
  - Lost to Soviet Union (1-3)
  - Lost to South Korea (2-3)
- Classification Matches
  - 5th/8th place: Defeated Canada (3-2)
  - 5th/6th place: Defeated East Germany (3-0) → Fifth place
- Team Roster
  - Mercedes Perez
  - Imilses Telles
  - Ana Díaz
  - Mercedes Pomares
  - Lucila Urgelles
  - Mercedes Roca
  - Miriam Herrera
  - Claudina Villaurrutia
  - Melanea Tartabull
  - Nelly Barnet
  - Ana María García
  - Evelina Borroto
- Head coach: Eugenio George

== Water polo ==
Men's team competition

- Team Roster
  - David Rodríguez
  - Eugenio Almenteros
  - Gerardo Rodríguez
  - Jesús Pérez
  - Jorge Rizo
  - Lazaro Costa
  - Nelson Domínguez
  - Oriel Domínguez
  - Oscar Periche
  - Osvaldo García
  - Ramon Peña
