= Ernesto Martínez =

Cuban volleyball player (1951–2007)

Personal information
- Full name: Ernesto Martínez Hernández
- Born: 20 November 1951; Pedro Betancourt, Matanzas Province, Cuba
- Died: 7 January 2007 (aged 55); Pedro Betancourt, Matanzas Province, Cuba
- Height: 1.77 m (5 ft 9 1/2 in)

Volleyball information
- Position: Outside hitter
- Number: 3

National team
1971–1983	Cuba
Medal record
Men's volleyball
Representing Cuba
Olympic Games
Bronze medal – third place	1976 Montreal	Team
World Championship
Bronze medal – third place	1978 Italy
FIVB World Cup
Silver medal – second place	1981 Japan
Bronze medal – third place	1977 Japan
Pan American Games
Gold medal – first place	1971 Cali	Team
Gold medal – first place	1975 Mexico City	Team
Gold medal – first place	1979 Caguas	Team
Silver medal – second place	1983 Caracas	Team
Central American and Caribbean Games
Gold medal – first place	1974 Santo Domingo	Team
Gold medal – first place	1978 Medellín	Team
Gold medal – first place	1982 Havana	Team

Ernesto Martínez Hernández (20 November 1951 – 7 January 2007), more commonly known as Ernesto Martínez, was a Cuban volleyball player who competed in the 1972, 1976, and 1980 Summer Olympics. He was the captain of the Cuban team in the late 1970s.

In 1972, Martínez was part of the Cuban team that finished tenth in the Olympic tournament in Munich. He played all six matches.

Four years later, Martínez won the bronze medal with the Cuban team in the 1976 Olympic tournament in Montreal. He played all six matches.

In 1978, Martínez won the bronze medal with the Cuban team at the 1978 FIVB World Championship in Italy.

At the 1980 Games, Martínez was a member of the Cuban team that finished seventh in the Olympic tournament in Moscow. He played five matches.

== Personal life and death ==
Martínez was born in Pedro Betancourt. He died of a stroke in Pedro Betancourt in January 2007.
