= Víctor García (volleyball) =

Cuban volleyball player (born 1950)

Víctor García Campos
Personal information
- Full name: Víctor Andrés García Campos
- Nationality: Cuban
- Born: 23 September 1950 (age 76)
- Height: 180 cm (5 ft 11 in)

Volleyball information
- Number: 4

National team
- Years: Team
- 1974–1980: Cuba
Medal record
Men's volleyball
Representing Cuba
Olympic Games
Bronze medal – third place	1976 Montreal	Team
World Championship
Bronze medal – third place	1978 Italy
FIVB World Cup
Bronze medal – third place	1977 Japan
Pan American Games
Gold medal – first place	1975 Mexico City	Team
Gold medal – first place	1979 Caguas	Team
Central American and Caribbean Games
Gold medal – first place	1974 Santo Domingo	Team

Víctor García Campos (born 23 September 1950) is a Cuban former volleyball player who competed in the 1976 Summer Olympics and the 1980 Summer Olympics.

In 1976, García was part of the Cuban team that won the bronze medal in the Olympic tournament in Montreal. He played all six matches. Four years later, García finished seventh with the Cuban team in the 1980 Olympic tournament in Moscow. He played all six matches.
