= Alfredo Figueredo =

Cuban volleyball player (born 1952)

Personal information
- Full name: Alfredo Figueredo Ricardo
- Born: 15 April 1952 (age 74); Havana, Cuba
- Height: 1.85 m (6 ft 1 in)

Volleyball information
- Number: 11

National team
1971–1979	Cuba
Medal record
Men's volleyball
Representing Cuba
Olympic Games
Bronze medal – third place	1976 Montreal	Team
World Championship
Bronze medal – third place	1978 Italy
FIVB World Cup
Bronze medal – third place	1977 Japan
Pan American Games
Gold medal – first place	1971 Cali	Team
Gold medal – first place	1975 Mexico City	Team
Gold medal – first place	1979 Caguas	Team
Central American and Caribbean Games
Gold medal – first place	1974 Santo Domingo	Team
Gold medal – first place	1978 Medellín	Team

Alfredo Figueredo Ricardo (born 15 April 1952) is a Cuban former volleyball player who competed in the 1972 Summer Olympics in Munich and the 1976 Summer Olympics in Montreal.

In 1972, Figueredo was part of the Cuban team that finished tenth in the Olympic tournament. He played five matches. Four years later, Figueredo won the bronze medal with the Cuban team in the 1976 Olympic tournament. He played all six matches.
