= Raúl Vilches =

Cuban volleyball player (1954–2022)

Raúl Vilches More

Personal information
- Full name: Raúl Vilches More
- Born: 2 October 1954; Cifuentes, Cuba
- Died: 13 January 2022 (aged 67); Medellín, Colombia
- Height: 1.93 m (6 ft 4 in)

Volleyball information
- Position: Middle blocker
- Number: 6

National team
1974–1987	Cuba
Honours
Men's volleyball
Representing Cuba
Olympic Games
Bronze medal – third place	1976 Montreal	Team
World Championship
Bronze medal – third place	1978 Italy
FIVB World Cup
Silver medal – second place	1981 Japan
Bronze medal – third place	1977 Japan
Friendship Games
Silver medal – second place	1984 Havana
Pan American Games
Gold medal – first place	1975 Mexico City	Team
Gold medal – first place	1979 Caguas	Team
Silver medal – second place	1983 Caracas	Team
Silver medal – second place	1987 Indianapolis	Team
Central American and Caribbean Games
Gold medal – first place	1974 Santo Domingo	Team
Gold medal – first place	1978 Medellín	Team
Gold medal – first place	1982 Havana	Team

Raúl Vilches More (2 October 1954 – 13 January 2022), more commonly known as Raúl Vilches, was a Cuban volleyball player and two-time Olympian. He was a middle blocker.

== Career ==
Vilches competed in the 1976 and the 1980 Summer Olympics. In 1976, he was part of the Cuban team that won the bronze medal in the Olympic tournament in Montreal. He played all six matches. Four years later, he finished seventh with the Cuban team in the 1980 Olympic tournament in Moscow. He played all six matches again.

== Personal life and death ==
Vilches died from cancer in Colombia on 13 January 2022, at the age of 67.
