= Leonel Marshall Sr. =

Cuban volleyball player

Personal information
- Full name: Leonel Marshall Steward, Sr.
- Born: 31 July 1954 (age 72); Camagüey, Cuba
- Height: 1.80 m (5 ft 11 in)

Volleyball information
- Position: Setter
- Number: 1

National team
1974–1980	Cuba
Medal record
Men's volleyball
Representing Cuba
Olympic Games
Bronze medal – third place	1976 Montreal	Team
World Championship
Bronze medal – third place	1978 Italy
FIVB World Cup
Bronze medal – third place	1977 Japan
Pan American Games
Gold medal – first place	1975 Mexico City	Team
Gold medal – first place	1979 Caguas	Team
Central American and Caribbean Games
Gold medal – first place	1974 Santo Domingo	Team

Leonel Marshall Steward Sr. (Note: In this Spanish name, the first or paternal surname is Marshall and the second or maternal family name is Steward.) (born 31 July 1954), more commonly known as Leonel Marshall Sr., is a Cuban former volleyball player who competed in the 1976 Summer Olympics in Montreal and the 1980 Summer Olympics in Moscow.

In 1976, Marshall was part of the Cuban team that won the bronze medal in the Olympic tournament. He played all six matches. Four years later, Marshall finished seventh with the Cuban team in the 1980 Olympic tournament. He played all six matches again.

Marshall participated in the 1975 Pan American Games in Mexico City and the 1979 Pan American Games in Caguas, winning a gold medal in each event.

== Personal life ==
Marshall's son, Leonel Marshall Jr., also became a professional volleyball player, and is known for his outstanding vertical jump.
