= Diego Lapera =

Cuban volleyball player (born 1950)

Personal information
- Full name: Diego José Lapera Sotolongo
- Nickname: Cheo
- Born: 13 November 1950 (age 75); Republic of Cuba
- Height: 1.81 m (5 ft 11 1/2 in)

Volleyball information
- Position: Outside hitter
- Number: 9

National team
1970–1980	Cuba
Medal record
Men's volleyball
Representing Cuba
Olympic Games
Bronze medal – third place	1976 Montreal	Team
FIVB World Cup
Bronze medal – third place	1977 Japan
Pan American Games
Gold medal – first place	1971 Cali	Team
Gold medal – first place	1975 Mexico City	Team
Gold medal – first place	1979 Caguas	Team
Central American and Caribbean Games
Gold medal – first place	1970 Panama City	Team
Gold medal – first place	1974 Santo Domingo	Team

Diego José Lapera Sotolongo (born 13 November 1950), also known as Diego Lapera, is a Cuban former volleyball player and three-time Olympian who competed in the 1972, 1976, and the 1980 Summer Olympics. He was a critical player late in matches when they were close.

In 1972, Lapera was part of the Cuban team that finished tenth in the Olympic tournament in Munich. He played all six matches. Four years later, he won the bronze medal with the Cuban team in the 1976 Olympic tournament in Montreal. He played all six matches. In 1980, he was a member of the Cuban team that finished seventh in the Olympic tournament in Moscow. He played two matches.
