= Carlos Salas =

Cuban volleyball player (born 1955)

Carlos Salas Pérez

Personal information
- Full name: Carlos Manuel Salas Pérez
- Nationality: Cuban
- Born: 10 October 1955 (age 71)
- Height: 1.95 m (6 ft 5 in)

Volleyball information
- Number: 5

National team
1975–1980	Cuba
Honours
Men's volleyball
Representing Cuba
Olympic Games
Bronze medal – third place	1976 Montreal	Team
World Championship
Bronze medal – third place	1978 Italy
FIVB World Cup
Bronze medal – third place	1977 Japan
Pan American Games
Gold medal – first place	1975 Mexico City	Team
Gold medal – first place	1979 Caguas	Team
Central American and Caribbean Games
Gold medal – first place	1978 Medellín	Team

Carlos Salas Pérez (born 10 October 1955) is a Cuban former volleyball player who competed in the 1976 and 1980 Summer Olympics.

In 1976, Salas was part of the Cuban team that won the bronze medal in the Olympic tournament in Montreal. He played all six matches. Four years later, he finished seventh with the Cuban team in the 1980 Olympic tournament in Moscow. He played all six matches again.
