= Jesús Savigne =

Cuban volleyball player (born 1953)

Personal information
- Full name: Jesús Savigne Savigne
- Born: 15 March 1953 (age 73); Havana, Cuba
- Height: 1.87 m (6 ft 2 in)

Volleyball information
- Number: 7

National team
1975–1978	Cuba
Honours
Men's volleyball
Representing Cuba
Olympic Games
Bronze medal – third place	1976 Montreal	Team
World Championship
Bronze medal – third place	1978 Italy
FIVB World Cup
Bronze medal – third place	1977 Japan
Pan American Games
Gold medal – first place	1975 Mexico City	Team
Central American and Caribbean Games
Gold medal – first place	1978 Medellín	Team

Jesús Savigne (born 15 March 1953) is a Cuban former volleyball player and coach. He previously worked as a coordinator for Fenerbahçe SK in Turkey.

== National team ==
Savigne won the volleyball bronze medal with Cuba at the 1976 Summer Olympics in Montreal.
