= Vladimir Kondra =

Russian former volleyball player (born 1950)

Personal information
- Full name: Vladimir Grigorevich Kondra
- Born: 16 November 1950 (age 75) Dzaudzhikau, North Ossetian ASSR, Russian SFSR, Soviet Union
- Height: 1.86 m (6 ft 1 in)

Volleyball information
- Position: Outside hitter
- Number: 12 (1972); 8 (1976–1980)

National team
- Years: Team
- 1971–1981: Soviet Union
Medal record
Men's volleyball
Representing Soviet Union
Olympic Games
Gold medal – first place	1980 Moscow	Team
Silver medal – second place	1976 Montreal	Team
Bronze medal – third place	1972 Munich	Team
World Championship
Gold medal – first place	1978 Italy
Silver medal – second place	1974 Mexico
World Cup
Gold medal – first place	1977 Japan
Gold medal – first place	1981 Japan
European Championship
Gold medal – first place	1971 Italy
Gold medal – first place	1975 Yugoslavia
Gold medal – first place	1977 Finland
Gold medal – first place	1979 France
Gold medal – first place	1981 Bulgaria

Vladimir Grigorevich Kondra (Russian: Владимир Григорьевич Кондра, born 16 November 1950) is a Russian former volleyball player who competed for the Soviet Union in the 1972 Summer Olympics, in the 1976 Summer Olympics, and in the 1980 Summer Olympics. After his retirement, he became a successful volleyball coach, working most notably in CSKA Moscow, Olympiacos and the French men's national team.

Kondra was born in Vladikavkaz.

In 1972, Kondra was part of the Soviet team that won the bronze medal in the Olympic tournament. He played all seven matches.

Four years later, Kondra won the silver medal with the Soviet team in the 1976 Olympic tournament. He played all five matches.

At the 1980 Games, Kondra was a member of the Soviet team that won the gold medal in the Olympic tournament. He played all six matches.

== Coaching ==
Kondra coached CSKA Moscow from 1988 to 1991, winning two CEV Champions League titles (1989, 1991) and three Soviet Championships (1989, 1990, 1991). In 1992, he became head coach of Greek powerhouse Olympiacos and coached them to two Greek Championships, two Greek Cups, and two CEV Champions League Final Four finishes (3rd place in 1993, 4th place in 1994).
