= Evelina Borroto =

Cuban volleyball player (born 1949)

Personal information
- Full name: Evelina Borroto Donner
- Born: 23 December 1949 (age 76); Camagüey, Cuba
- Height: 1.80 m (5 ft 11 in)

Volleyball information
- Number: 12

National team
1967–1976	Cuba
Honours
Women's volleyball
Representing Cuba
Pan American Games
Gold medal – first place	1971 Cali	Team
Gold medal – first place	1975 Mexico City	Team
Bronze medal – third place	1967 Winnipeg	Team
Central American and Caribbean Games
Gold medal – first place	1974 Santo Domingo	Team
Silver medal – second place	1970 Panama City	Team

Evelina Borroto (born 23 December 1949) is a retired Cuban volleyball player. She competed with the Cuban women's national volleyball team at the 1972 Summer Olympics in Munich and the 1976 Summer Olympics in Montreal. She helped the Cuban team win the bronze medal at the 1967 Pan American Games, and the gold medal at the 1971 and 1975 Pan American Games.
