= Aleksandr Savin (volleyball player) =

Russian former volleyball player (born 1957)

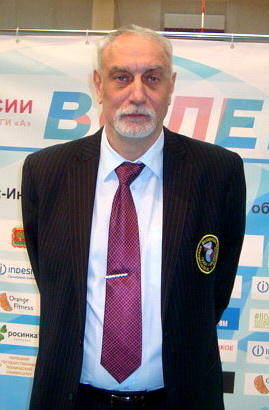
- Savin in 2018

Personal information
- Born: 1 July 1957 (age 69); Taganrog, Russian SFSR, Soviet Union
- Height: 200 cm (6 ft 7 in)

Volleyball information
- Position: Middle blocker
- Number: 3

National team
1975–1986	Soviet Union
Honours
Men's volleyball
Representing Soviet Union
Olympic Games
Gold medal – first place	1980 Moscow	Team
Silver medal – second place	1976 Montreal	Team
World Championship
Gold medal – first place	1978 Italy
Gold medal – first place	1982 Argentina
Silver medal – second place	1986 France	Team
FIVB World Cup
Gold medal – first place	1977 Japan
Gold medal – first place	1981 Japan
Goodwill Games
Gold medal – first place	1986 Moscow
Friendship Games
Gold medal – first place	1984 Havana
European Championship
Gold medal – first place	1975 Yugoslavia
Gold medal – first place	1977 Finland
Gold medal – first place	1979 France
Gold medal – first place	1981 Bulgaria
Gold medal – first place	1983 East Germany
Gold medal – first place	1985 Netherlands
European Junior Championship
Gold medal – first place	1975 West Germany	Under-20

Aleksandr Borisovich Savin (Russian: Александр Борисович Савин; born 1 July 1957) is a Russian former volleyball player who competed for the Soviet Union in the 1976 Summer Olympics in Montreal and the 1980 Summer Olympics in Moscow.

== Early life and education ==
Savin was born in Taganrog. As a child, he moved with his parents in the city of Obninsk, Kaluga Oblast. He studied at the high school No.6 Obninsk. As a student in Obninsk, he began playing volleyball. He played club volleyball in 1967 for Obninsk Youth (in 2004 it was renamed Sports School, which bears Savin's name). His first coach was Vladimir Pitanov (1946–2016).

== Career ==
In 1976, Savin was part of the Soviet team that won the silver medal in the Olympic tournament. He played all five matches. Four years later, he won the gold medal with the Soviet team in the 1980 Olympic tournament. He played all six matches.

Savin was a major part of the Soviet Union men's national volleyball team's success in the late 1970s to early 1980s by winning gold medals at the 1977 FIVB World Cup, 1978 FIVB World Championship, 1980 Olympic Games, 1981 FIVB World Cup, and 1982 FIVB World Championship.

== Recognition ==
Awarded Honored Master of Sports of the USSR (1976), Order of Friendship of Peoples (1985), Order of the Badge of Honour (1980).

On October 22, 2010, Savin was admitted to the International Volleyball Hall of Fame (Holyoke, United States).
