= Antonio Rodríguez (volleyball) =

Cuban volleyball player

Personal information
- Full name: Antonio Clemente Rodríguez Aguirre
- Nationality: Cuban
- Born: 8 October 1951 (age 75)
- Height: 1.86 m (6 ft 1 in)

Volleyball information
- Number: 10

National team
- Years: Team
- 1971–1976: Cuba
Honours
Men's volleyball
Representing Cuba
Olympic Games
Bronze medal – third place	1976 Montreal	Team
Pan American Games
Gold medal – first place	1971 Cali	Team
Gold medal – first place	1975 Mexico City	Team
Central American and Caribbean Games
Gold medal – first place	1974 Santo Domingo	Team

Antonio Rodríguez Aguirre (born 8 October 1951) is a Cuban former volleyball player who competed in the 1972 Summer Olympics and the 1976 Summer Olympics.

In 1972, Rodríguez was part of the Cuban team that finished tenth in the Olympic tournament in Munich. He played four matches. Four years later, Rodríguez won the bronze medal with the Cuban team in the 1976 Olympic tournament in Montreal. He played all six matches.
