= Mercedes Roca =

Cuban volleyball player

Personal information
- Full name: Mercedes Roca Arias
- Nationality: Cuban
- Born: 27 November 1952 (age 73)
- Height: 1.77 m (5 ft 10 in)

Volleyball information
- Number: 6

National team
1971–1976	Cuba
Honours
Women's volleyball
Representing Cuba
Pan American Games
Gold medal – first place	1971 Cali	Team
Gold medal – first place	1975 Mexico City	Team
Central American and Caribbean Games
Gold medal – first place	1974 Santo Domingo	Team

Mercedes Roca (born 27 November 1952) is a retired Cuban volleyball player. She competed with the Cuban women's national volleyball team at the 1972 and 1976 Summer Olympics. Roca won a gold medal with the Cuban team at the 1971 and 1975 Pan American Games.
