= Pāvels Seļivanovs =

Latvian volleyball player (born 1952)

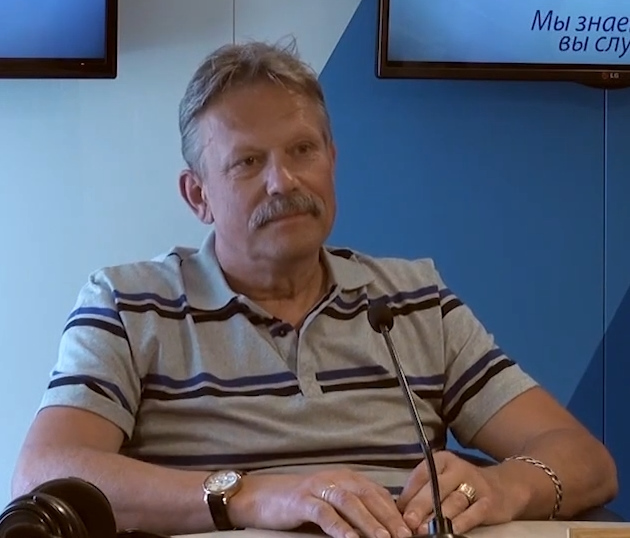
- Selivanovs in 2019

Personal information
- Nationality: Latvian; Soviet
- Born: 23 July 1952 (age 74); Riga, Latvian SFSR, Soviet Union
- Height: 1.94 m (6 ft 4 in)

Volleyball information
- Position: Outside hitter
- Number: 6

National team
1973–1986	Soviet Union
Honours
Men's volleyball
Representing Soviet Union
Olympic Games
Gold medal – first place	1980 Moscow	Team
Silver medal – second place	1976 Montreal	Team
World Championship
Gold medal – first place	1978 Italy
Gold medal – first place	1982 Argentina
Silver medal – second place	1986 France	Team
World Cup
Gold medal – first place	1977 Japan
Gold medal – first place	1981 Japan
Goodwill Games
Gold medal – first place	1986 Moscow
Friendship Games
Gold medal – first place	1984 Havana
European Championship
Gold medal – first place	1975 Yugoslavia
Gold medal – first place	1977 Finland
Gold medal – first place	1979 France
Gold medal – first place	1983 East Germany
Universiade
Gold medal – first place	1973 Moscow

Pavels Seļivanovs (born 23 July 1952) is a Latvian former volleyball player who competed for the Soviet Union in the 1976 Summer Olympics in Montreal and the 1980 Summer Olympics in Moscow.

In 1976, Selivanovs was part of the Soviet team that won the silver medal in the Olympic tournament. Four years later, he won the gold medal with the Soviet team in the 1980 Olympic tournament.

== Awards ==
- Olympic volleyball silver medal 1976
- Olympic volleyball gold medal 1980
- Four-time European Championship gold medal 1975, 1977, 1979, 1983
- Two-time FIVB World Championship gold medal 1978, 1982
- Two-time FIVB World Cup gold medal 1977, 1981
