= Villaurrutia =

Villaurrutia may refer to:

== People ==
- Claudina Villaurrutia (born 1955), Cuban volleyball player
- Xavier Villaurrutia (1903–1950), Mexican poet

== Other uses ==
- Xavier Villaurrutia Award, literary prize
