= 1982 FIVB Men's Volleyball World Championship =

Volleyball World Championship

1982 FIVB World Championship
Tournament details
- Host country: Argentina
- Dates: 1–15 October
- Teams: 24
- Venues: 4 (in 4 host cities)
- Officially opened by: Reynaldo Bignone

Final positions
- Champions: Soviet Union (6th title)

The 1982 FIVB Men's World Championship was the tenth edition of the tournament, organised by the world's governing body, the FIVB. It was held from 1 to 15 October 1982 in Argentina.

== Qualification ==
Means of qualification	Date	Host	Vacancies	Qualified
Host country	—N/a	—N/a	1	Argentina
1978 FIVB Men's Volleyball World Championship	20 Sep – 1 Oct 1978	Italy	12	Soviet Union
1978 FIVB Men's Volleyball World Championship	20 Sep – 1 Oct 1978	Italy	12	Italy
1978 FIVB Men's Volleyball World Championship	20 Sep – 1 Oct 1978	Italy	12	Cuba
1978 FIVB Men's Volleyball World Championship	20 Sep – 1 Oct 1978	Italy	12	South Korea
1978 FIVB Men's Volleyball World Championship	20 Sep – 1 Oct 1978	Italy	12	Czechoslovakia
1978 FIVB Men's Volleyball World Championship	20 Sep – 1 Oct 1978	Italy	12	Brazil
1978 FIVB Men's Volleyball World Championship	20 Sep – 1 Oct 1978	Italy	12	China
1978 FIVB Men's Volleyball World Championship	20 Sep – 1 Oct 1978	Italy	12	Poland
1978 FIVB Men's Volleyball World Championship	20 Sep – 1 Oct 1978	Italy	12	East Germany
1978 FIVB Men's Volleyball World Championship	20 Sep – 1 Oct 1978	Italy	12	Bulgaria
1978 FIVB Men's Volleyball World Championship	20 Sep – 1 Oct 1978	Italy	12	Japan
1978 FIVB Men's Volleyball World Championship	20 Sep – 1 Oct 1978	Italy	12	Mexico
1981 Men's European Volleyball Championship	19–27 September 1981	Bulgaria	3	Romania
1981 Men's European Volleyball Championship	19–27 September 1981	Bulgaria	3	France
1981 Men's European Volleyball Championship	19–27 September 1981	Bulgaria	3	Finland
1979 Asian Men's Volleyball Championship	16–23 December 1979	(Bahrain) Manama	2	Australia
1979 Asian Men's Volleyball Championship	16–23 December 1979	(Bahrain) Manama	2	~~India~~; Iraq*
1981 Men's NORCECA Volleyball Championship	4–10 July 1981	Mexico City	2	United States
1981 Men's NORCECA Volleyball Championship	4–10 July 1981	Mexico City	2	Canada
1981 Men's South American Volleyball Championship	12–19 July 1981	(Chile) Santiago	2	Chile
1981 Men's South American Volleyball Championship	12–19 July 1981	(Chile) Santiago	2	Venezuela
1979 Men's African Volleyball Championship	9–15 November 1979	(Libya) Tripoli	2	Tunisia
1979 Men's African Volleyball Championship	9–15 November 1979	(Libya) Tripoli	2	Libya
Total			24	

* India withdrew and were replaced by Iraq.

== Venues ==
1982 FIVB Men's Volleyball World Championship (Argentina)	Pool D, E, W, Y and Final round	Pool A, C, W, Y and Final round	Pool F, X, Z and Final round	Pool B, X, Z and Final round
1982 FIVB Men's Volleyball World Championship (Argentina)	Buenos Aires, Argentina	Rosario, Argentina	Mendoza, Argentina	Catamarca, Argentina
1982 FIVB Men's Volleyball World Championship (Argentina)	Luna Park	Estadio Cubierto Newell's Old Boys	Estadio Pacífico	Polideportivo Fray Mamerto Esquiú
1982 FIVB Men's Volleyball World Championship (Argentina)	Capacity: 8,400	Capacity: 7,500	Capacity: Unknown	Capacity: Unknown
1982 FIVB Men's Volleyball World Championship (Argentina)			No Image	No Image

== Pools composition ==
The teams are seeded based on their final ranking at the 1978 FIVB Men's World Championship.

Pool A	Pool B	Pool C
Argentina (Host); Japan (11th); Mexico; Tunisia	Soviet Union (1st); Bulgaria (10th); Chile; United States	Italy (2nd); East Germany (9th); Canada; Australia
Pool D	Pool E	Pool F
Cuba (3rd); Poland (8th); Romania; Venezuela	South Korea (4th); China (7th); France; Finland	Czechoslovakia (5th); Brazil (6th); Libya; Iraq

== Results ==
=== First round ===
==== Pool A ====
Pos	Team	Pld	W	L	Pts	SW	SL	SR	SPW	SPL	SPR	Qualification
1	Japan	3	3	0	6	9	1	9.000	147	97	1.515	1st–12th pools
2	Argentina	3	2	1	5	7	4	1.750	160	112	1.429	1st–12th pools
3	Mexico	3	1	2	4	4	8	0.500	146	163	0.896	13th–24th pools
4	Tunisia	3	0	3	3	2	9	0.222	78	159	0.491	13th–24th pools

Date		Score		Set 1	Set 2	Set 3	Set 4	Set 5	Total
2 Oct	Japan	3–0	Mexico	15–11	15–8	15–9			45–28
2 Oct	Argentina	3–0	Tunisia	15–2	15–4	15–0			45–6
3 Oct	Japan	3–0	Tunisia	15–8	15–5	15–4			45–17
3 Oct	Argentina	3–1	Mexico	16–14	13–15	15–3	19–17		63–49
4 Oct	Mexico	3–2	Tunisia	13–15	11–15	15–9	15–9	15–7	69–55
4 Oct	Argentina	1–3	Japan	15–10	15–17	11–15	11–15		52–57

==== Pool B ====
Pos	Team	Pld	W	L	Pts	SW	SL	SR	SPW	SPL	SPR	Qualification
1	Soviet Union	3	3	0	6	9	0	MAX	136	64	2.125	1st–12th pools
2	Bulgaria	3	2	1	5	6	5	1.200	131	118	1.110	1st–12th pools
3	United States	3	1	2	4	5	6	0.833	143	124	1.153	13th–24th pools
4	Chile	3	0	3	3	0	9	0.000	31	135	0.230	13th–24th pools

Date		Score		Set 1	Set 2	Set 3	Set 4	Set 5	Total
2 Oct	Soviet Union	3–0	Chile	15–0	15–4	15–8			45–12
2 Oct	Bulgaria	3–2	United States	13–15	15–6	12–15	15–11	16–14	71–61
3 Oct	Bulgaria	3–0	Chile	15–5	15–5	15–2			45–12
3 Oct	Soviet Union	3–0	United States	15–11	15–12	16–14			46–37
4 Oct	United States	3–0	Chile	15–1	15–1	15–5			45–7
4 Oct	Soviet Union	3–0	Bulgaria	15–7	15–5	15–3			45–15

==== Pool C ====
Pos	Team	Pld	W	L	Pts	SW	SL	SR	SPW	SPL	SPR	Qualification
1	Canada	3	2	1	5	8	3	2.667	138	115	1.200	1st–12th pools
2	East Germany	3	2	1	5	6	3	2.000	119	89	1.337	1st–12th pools
3	Italy	3	2	1	5	6	5	1.200	140	104	1.346	13th–24th pools
4	Australia	3	0	3	3	0	9	0.000	46	135	0.341	13th–24th pools

Date		Score		Set 1	Set 2	Set 3	Set 4	Set 5	Total
1 Oct	Italy	3–0	Australia	15–1	15–1	15–8			45–10
1 Oct	East Germany	0–3	Canada	12–15	6–15	10–15			28–45
2 Oct	East Germany	3–0	Australia	15–5	15–6	15–5			45–16
2 Oct	Italy	3–2	Canada	15–5	9–15	15–5	13–15	15–8	67–48
3 Oct	Canada	3–0	Australia	15–1	15–10	15–9			45–20
3 Oct	Italy	0–3	East Germany	14–16	6–15	8–15			28–46

==== Pool D ====
Pos	Team	Pld	W	L	Pts	SW	SL	SR	SPW	SPL	SPR	Qualification
1	Poland	3	3	0	6	9	1	9.000	144	70	2.057	1st–12th pools
2	Cuba	3	2	1	5	7	3	2.333	130	90	1.444	1st–12th pools
3	Romania	3	1	2	4	3	7	0.429	106	128	0.828	13th–24th pools
4	Venezuela	3	0	3	3	1	9	0.111	58	150	0.387	13th–24th pools

Date		Score		Set 1	Set 2	Set 3	Set 4	Set 5	Total
2 Oct	Cuba	3–0	Venezuela	15–5	15–3	15–4			45–12
2 Oct	Poland	3–0	Romania	15–6	15–10	15–6			45–22
3 Oct	Poland	3–0	Venezuela	15–2	15–5	15–1			45–8
3 Oct	Cuba	3–0	Romania	15–6	15–11	15–7			45–24
4 Oct	Romania	3–1	Venezuela	15–3	15–9	15–17	15–9		60–38
4 Oct	Cuba	1–3	Poland	15–9	10–15	5–15	10–15		40–54

==== Pool E ====
Pos	Team	Pld	W	L	Pts	SW	SL	SR	SPW	SPL	SPR	Qualification
1	China	3	3	0	6	9	0	MAX	137	78	1.756	1st–12th pools
2	South Korea	3	2	1	5	6	4	1.500	128	135	0.948	1st–12th pools
3	France	3	1	2	4	3	8	0.375	127	157	0.809	13th–24th pools
4	Finland	3	0	3	3	3	9	0.333	143	165	0.867	13th–24th pools

Date		Score		Set 1	Set 2	Set 3	Set 4	Set 5	Total
1 Oct	China	3–0	France	15–10	15–5	17–15			47–30
1 Oct	South Korea	3–1	Finland	16–14	15–12	14–16	15–11		60–53
2 Oct	South Korea	3–0	France	16–14	15–12	15–11			46–37
2 Oct	China	3–0	Finland	15–12	15–5	15–9			45–26
3 Oct	South Korea	0–3	China	12–15	6–15	4–15			22–45
3 Oct	France	3–2	Finland	3–15	15–11	15–9	11–15	16–14	60–64

==== Pool F ====
Pos	Team	Pld	W	L	Pts	SW	SL	SR	SPW	SPL	SPR	Qualification
1	Czechoslovakia	3	3	0	6	9	1	9.000	147	81	1.815	1st–12th pools
2	Brazil	3	2	1	5	7	3	2.333	139	76	1.829	1st–12th pools
3	Iraq	3	1	2	4	3	8	0.375	89	141	0.631	13th–24th pools
4	Libya	3	0	3	3	2	9	0.222	81	158	0.513	13th–24th pools

Date		Score		Set 1	Set 2	Set 3	Set 4	Set 5	Total
2 Oct	Czechoslovakia	3–0	Iraq	15–6	15–7	15–3			45–16
2 Oct	Brazil	3–0	Libya	15–3	15–5	15–6			45–14
3 Oct	Brazil	3–0	Iraq	15–0	15–2	15–3			45–5
3 Oct	Czechoslovakia	3–0	Libya	15–6	15–3	15–7			45–16
4 Oct	Libya	2–3	Iraq	7–15	15–10	15–13	8–15	6–15	51–68
4 Oct	Czechoslovakia	3–1	Brazil	15–12	16–14	11–15	15–8		57–49

=== Second round ===
The results and the points of the matches between the same teams that were already played during the preliminary round shall be taken into account for the second round.

==== 1st–12th pools ====
===== Pool W =====
Pos	Team	Pld	W	L	Pts	SW	SL	SR	SPW	SPL	SPR	Qualification
1	Japan	5	4	1	9	13	6	2.167	252	218	1.156	Finals
2	Argentina	5	4	1	9	13	9	1.444	288	261	1.103	Finals
3	China	5	3	2	8	11	6	1.833	221	168	1.315	5th–8th places
4	South Korea	5	2	3	7	8	9	0.889	192	225	0.853	5th–8th places
5	Canada	5	2	3	7	8	10	0.800	220	235	0.936	9th–12th places
6	East Germany	5	0	5	5	2	15	0.133	177	243	0.728	9th–12th places

Location: Rosario

Date		Score		Set 1	Set 2	Set 3	Set 4	Set 5	Total
7 Oct	Canada	3–1	Japan	14–16	15–7	15–11	18–16		62–50
7 Oct	China	3–0	East Germany	15–9	15–12	15–8			45–29
7 Oct	Argentina	3–2	South Korea	10–15	15–12	15–7	12–15	15–7	67–56
8 Oct	South Korea	3–0	East Germany	15–11	15–12	15–9			45–32
8 Oct	Argentina	3–2	Canada	16–14	15–5	12–15	5–15	15–9	63–58
8 Oct	Japan	3–2	China	4–15	15–6	15–6	4–15	15–11	53–53

Location: Buenos Aires

Date		Score		Set 1	Set 2	Set 3	Set 4	Set 5	Total
10 Oct	China	3–0	Canada	15–1	17–15	15–3			47–19
10 Oct	Japan	3–0	South Korea	15–6	15–11	15–5			45–22
10 Oct	Argentina	3–2	East Germany	7–15	15–7	8–15	16–14	15–8	61–59
11 Oct	South Korea	3–0	Canada	17–15	15–8	15–13			47–36
11 Oct	Japan	3–0	East Germany	17–15	15–11	15–3			47–29
11 Oct	Argentina	3–0	China	15–10	15–11	15–10			45–31

===== Pool X =====
Pos	Team	Pld	W	L	Pts	SW	SL	SR	SPW	SPL	SPR	Qualification
1	Soviet Union	5	5	0	10	15	2	7.500	246	128	1.922	Finals
2	Brazil	5	3	2	8	10	7	1.429	217	204	1.064	Finals
3	Bulgaria	5	2	3	7	9	11	0.818	228	255	0.894	5th–8th places
4	Poland	5	2	3	7	7	10	0.700	194	215	0.902	5th–8th places
5	Cuba	5	2	3	7	7	13	0.538	231	271	0.852	9th–12th places
6	Czechoslovakia	5	1	4	6	8	13	0.615	247	290	0.852	9th–12th places

Location: Mendoza

Date		Score		Set 1	Set 2	Set 3	Set 4	Set 5	Total
7 Oct	Bulgaria	3–2	Czechoslovakia	13–15	12–15	15–6	15–12	15–9	70–57
7 Oct	Brazil	3–0	Poland	15–12	15–8	15–10			45–30
7 Oct	Soviet Union	3–0	Cuba	15–12	15–3	15–6			45–21
8 Oct	Bulgaria	3–0	Poland	15–10	15–13	15–4			45–27
8 Oct	Brazil	3–0	Cuba	15–9	15–12	15–13			45–34
8 Oct	Soviet Union	3–1	Czechoslovakia	10–15	15–12	15–6	15–4		55–37

Location: Catamarca

Date		Score		Set 1	Set 2	Set 3	Set 4	Set 5	Total
10 Oct	Cuba	3–2	Czechoslovakia	14–16	17–15	7–15	15–9	15–12	68–67
10 Oct	Brazil	3–1	Bulgaria	13–15	15–6	15–7	15–10		58–38
10 Oct	Soviet Union	3–1	Poland	15–9	11–15	15–9	15–2		56–35
11 Oct	Cuba	3–2	Bulgaria	12–15	15–9	11–15	15–12	15–9	68–60
11 Oct	Soviet Union	3–0	Brazil	15–7	15–7	15–6			45–20
11 Oct	Poland	3–0	Czechoslovakia	15–8	15–5	18–16			48–29

==== 13th–24th pools ====
===== Pool Y =====
Pos	Team	Pld	W	L	Pts	SW	SL	SR	SPW	SPL	SPR	Qualification
1	Italy	5	5	0	10	15	1	15.000	190	104	1.827	13th–16th places
2	France	5	4	1	9	13	7	1.857	196	152	1.289	13th–16th places
3	Mexico	5	3	2	8	11	10	1.100	200	204	0.980	17th–20th places
4	Finland	5	2	3	7	10	9	1.111	198	165	1.200	17th–20th places
5	Tunisia	5	1	4	6	5	12	0.417	91	171	0.532	21st–24th places
6	Australia	5	0	5	5	0	15	0.000	101	180	0.561	21st–24th places

Location: Buenos Aires

Date		Score		Set 1	Set 2	Set 3	Set 4	Set 5	Total
7 Oct	Finland	0–3	Italy	13–15	10–15	11–15			34–45
7 Oct	Mexico	3–0	Australia	15–6	15–9	15–4			45–19
7 Oct	Tunisia	0–3	France	4–15	1–15	2–15			7–45
8 Oct	France	3–2	Mexico	11–15	15–13	10–15	15–12	15–11	66–66
8 Oct	Finland	3–0	Australia	15–7	15–9	15–6			45–22
8 Oct	Italy	3–0	Tunisia	15–3	15–2	15–5			45–10

Location: Rosario

Date		Score		Set 1	Set 2	Set 3	Set 4	Set 5	Total
10 Oct	Italy	3–1	France	10–15	15–13	15–6	15–6		55–40
10 Oct	Mexico	3–2	Finland	16–14	8–15	17–15	11–15	17–15	69–74
10 Oct	Tunisia	3–0	Australia	15–13	15–13	15–10			45–36
11 Oct	Finland	3–0	Tunisia	15–7	15–9	15–13			45–29
11 Oct	Italy	3–0	Mexico	15–2	15–10	15–8			45–20
11 Oct	France	3–0	Australia	15–10	15–8	15–6			45–24

===== Pool Z =====
Pos	Team	Pld	W	L	Pts	SW	SL	SR	SPW	SPL	SPR	Qualification
1	United States	5	5	0	10	15	1	15.000	193	96	2.010	13th–16th places
2	Romania	5	4	1	9	13	4	3.250	182	93	1.957	13th–16th places
3	Venezuela	5	3	2	8	10	9	1.111	189	158	1.196	17th–20th places
4	Iraq	5	2	3	7	7	11	0.636	109	172	0.634	17th–20th places
5	Chile	5	1	4	6	5	12	0.417	142	194	0.732	21st–24th places
6	Libya	5	0	5	5	2	15	0.133	78	180	0.433	21st–24th places

Date		Score		Set 1	Set 2	Set 3	Set 4	Set 5	Total
7 Oct	Venezuela	3–1	Iraq	15–4	15–5	11–15	15–3		56–27
7 Oct	Chile	0–3	Romania	5–15	4–15	3–15			12–45
7 Oct	United States	3–0	Libya	15–7	15–1	15–3			45–11
8 Oct	Romania	3–0	Iraq	15–8	15–3	10–2			45–13
8 Oct	United States	3–0	Venezuela	15–2	15–4	15–8			45–14
8 Oct	Chile	3–0	Libya	15–10	15–12	15–8			45–30
10 Oct	United States	3–0	Iraq	15–6	15–9	15–9			45–24
10 Oct	Venezuela	3–2	Chile	15–8	16–18	15–8	13–15	15–10	74–59
10 Oct	Romania	3–0	Libya	15–5	15–4	15–1			45–10
11 Oct	Venezuela	3–0	Libya	15–10	15–8	15–9			45–27
11 Oct	Iraq	3–0	Chile	15–12	15–6	15–8			45–26
11 Oct	United States	3–1	Romania	15–11	13–15	15–11	15–10		58–47

=== Final round ===
==== 21st–24th places ====
21st–24th semifinals
14 October – Buenos Aires
Australia	3
Chile	1
14 October – Buenos Aires
Tunisia	3
Libya	1

21st place
15 October – Buenos Aires
Australia	1
Tunisia	3
23rd place
15 October – Buenos Aires
Chile	3
Libya	1

===== 21st–24th semifinals =====
Date		Score		Set 1	Set 2	Set 3	Set 4	Set 5	Total
14 Oct	Australia	3–1	Chile	13–15	15–10	15–3	15–2		58–30
14 Oct	Tunisia	3–1	Libya	15–11	14–16	15–8	15–8		59–43

===== 23rd place match =====
Date		Score		Set 1	Set 2	Set 3	Set 4	Set 5	Total
15 Oct	Chile	3–1	Libya	7–15	15–8	15–9	15–1		52–33

===== 21st place match =====
Date		Score		Set 1	Set 2	Set 3	Set 4	Set 5	Total
15 Oct	Australia	1–3	Tunisia	15–12	12–15	4–15	4–15		35–57

==== 17th–20th places ====
17th–20th semifinals
14 October – Rosario
Finland	3
Venezuela	1
14 October – Rosario
Mexico	3
Iraq	0

17th place
15 October – Rosario
Finland	3
Mexico	0
19th place
15 October – Rosario
Venezuela	3
Iraq	2

===== 17th–20th semifinals =====
Date		Score		Set 1	Set 2	Set 3	Set 4	Set 5	Total
14 Oct	Finland	3–1	Venezuela	16–14	15–11	8–15	15–10		54–50
14 Oct	Mexico	3–0	Iraq	15–2	15–10	15–3			45–15

===== 19th place match =====
Date		Score		Set 1	Set 2	Set 3	Set 4	Set 5	Total
15 Oct	Venezuela	3–2	Iraq	15–10	11–15	11–15	15–3	15–8	67–51

===== 17th place match =====
Date		Score		Set 1	Set 2	Set 3	Set 4	Set 5	Total
15 Oct	Finland	3–0	Mexico	15–8	15–12	16–14			46–34

==== 13th–16th places ====
13th–16th semifinals
14 October – Catamarca
United States	3
France	0
14 October – Catamarca
Italy	3
Romania	2

13th place
15 October – Catamarca
United States	3
Italy	0
15th place
15 October – Catamarca
France	2
Romania	3

===== 13th–16th semifinals =====
Date		Score		Set 1	Set 2	Set 3	Set 4	Set 5	Total
14 Oct	United States	3–0	France	15–6	15–4	15–11			45–21
14 Oct	Italy	3–2	Romania	15–13	15–9	4–15	10–15	18–16	62–68

===== 15th place match =====
Date		Score		Set 1	Set 2	Set 3	Set 4	Set 5	Total
15 Oct	France	2–3	Romania	10–15	15–13	15–13	14–16	11–15	65–72

===== 13th place match =====
Date		Score		Set 1	Set 2	Set 3	Set 4	Set 5	Total
15 Oct	United States	3–0	Italy	15–10	15–5	16–6			45–21

==== 9th–12th places ====
9th–12th semifinals
14 October – Mendoza
Czechoslovakia	3
Canada	0
14 October – Mendoza
Cuba	3
East Germany	0

9th place
15 October – Mendoza
Czechoslovakia	3
Cuba	0
11th place
15 October – Mendoza
Canada	3
East Germany	2

===== 9th–12th semifinals =====
Date		Score		Set 1	Set 2	Set 3	Set 4	Set 5	Total
14 Oct	Czechoslovakia	3–0	Canada	16–14	16–14	15–6			47–34
14 Oct	Cuba	3–0	East Germany	15–3	15–4	15–8			45–15

===== 11th place match =====
Date		Score		Set 1	Set 2	Set 3	Set 4	Set 5	Total
15 Oct	Canada	3–2	East Germany	15–9	10–15	15–11	7–15	15–2	62–52

===== 9th place match =====
Date		Score		Set 1	Set 2	Set 3	Set 4	Set 5	Total
15 Oct	Czechoslovakia	3–0	Cuba	15–11	15–2	15–13			45–26

==== 5th–8th places ====
5th–8th semifinals
14 October – Rosario
Poland	3
China	1
14 October – Rosario
Bulgaria	3
South Korea	0

5th place
15 October – Rosario
Poland	1
Bulgaria	3
7th place
15 October – Rosario
China	3
South Korea	0

===== 5th–8th semifinals =====
Date		Score		Set 1	Set 2	Set 3	Set 4	Set 5	Total
14 Oct	Poland	3–1	China	10–15	15–4	15–4	15–12		55–35
14 Oct	Bulgaria	3–0	South Korea	15–13	15–6	15–8			45–27

===== 7th place match =====
Date		Score		Set 1	Set 2	Set 3	Set 4	Set 5	Total
15 Oct	China	3–0	South Korea	15–4	15–7	15–8			45–19

===== 5th place match =====
Date		Score		Set 1	Set 2	Set 3	Set 4	Set 5	Total
15 Oct	Poland	1–3	Bulgaria	10–15	15–13	6–15	7–15		38–58

==== Finals ====
Semifinals
14 October – Buenos Aires
Brazil	3
Japan	0
14 October – Buenos Aires
Soviet Union	3
Argentina	0

Final
15 October – Buenos Aires
Brazil	0
Soviet Union	3
3rd place
15 October – Buenos Aires
Japan	0
Argentina	3

===== Semifinals =====
Date		Score		Set 1	Set 2	Set 3	Set 4	Set 5	Total
14 Oct	Brazil	3–0	Japan	15–7	20–18	15–11			50–36
14 Oct	Soviet Union	3–0	Argentina	15–7	15–10	15–9			45–26

===== 3rd place match =====
Date		Score		Set 1	Set 2	Set 3	Set 4	Set 5	Total
15 Oct	Japan	0–3	Argentina	14–16	14–16	11–15			39–47

===== Final =====
Date		Score		Set 1	Set 2	Set 3	Set 4	Set 5	Total
15 Oct	Brazil	0–3	Soviet Union	3–15	4–15	5–15			12–45

== Final standing ==
Rank	Team
1st place, gold medalist(s)	Soviet Union
2nd place, silver medalist(s)	Brazil
3rd place, bronze medalist(s)	Argentina
4	Japan
5	Bulgaria
6	Poland
7	China
8	South Korea
9	Czechoslovakia
10	Cuba
11	Canada
12	East Germany
13	United States
14	Italy
15	Romania
16	France
17	Finland
18	Mexico
19	Venezuela
20	Iraq
21	Tunisia
22	Australia
23	Chile
24	Libya

1982 Men's World champions

Soviet Union
6th title

Team roster
Vladimir Dorokhov, Sergey Gribov, Viljar Loor, Valeri Losev, Oleg Moliboga, Yury Panchenko, Aleksandr Savin, Pavel Selivanov, Vladimir Shkurikhin, Oleg Smugilev, Aleksandr Sorokolet, Vyacheslav Zaytsev
Head coach
Viacheslav Platonov
