= Vyacheslav Zaytsev =

Soviet volleyball player (1952–2023)

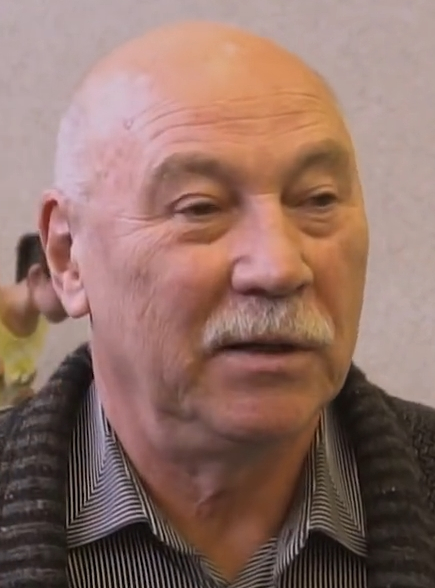
- Zaytsev in 2019

Personal information
- Full name: Vyacheslav Alekseyevich Zaytsev
- Born: 12 November 1952 Leningrad, Russian SFSR, Soviet Union
- Died: 12 June 2023 (aged 70)
- Height: 1.91 m (6 ft 3 in)

Volleyball information
- Position: Setter
- Number: 2 (1976–1980); 3 (1988)

National team
- Years: Team
- 1971–1988: Soviet Union
Honours
Men's volleyball
Representing Soviet Union
Olympic Games
Gold medal – first place	1980 Moscow	Team
Silver medal – second place	1976 Montreal	Team
Silver medal – second place	1988 Seoul	Team
World Championship
Gold medal – first place	1978 Italy
Gold medal – first place	1982 Argentina
Silver medal – second place	1974 Mexico
Silver medal – second place	1986 France	Team
World Cup
Gold medal – first place	1977 Japan
Gold medal – first place	1981 Japan
Silver medal – second place	1985 Japan
Goodwill Games
Gold medal – first place	1986 Moscow
Friendship Games
Gold medal – first place	1984 Havana
European Championship
Gold medal – first place	1975 Yugoslavia
Gold medal – first place	1977 Finland
Gold medal – first place	1979 France
Gold medal – first place	1981 Bulgaria
Gold medal – first place	1983 East Germany
Gold medal – first place	1985 Netherlands
Universiade
Gold medal – first place	1973 Moscow
European Junior Championship
Gold medal – first place	1971 Spain	Under-20

Vyacheslav Alekseyevich Zaytsev (Russian: Вячеслав Алексеевич Зайцев, 12 November 1952 – 12 June 2023) was a Russian volleyball player who competed for the Soviet Union in the 1976, 1980, and the 1988 Summer Olympics. He was a setter.

In 1976, Zaytsev was part of the Soviet team that won the silver medal in the Olympic tournament in Montreal.

Zaytsev became the team captain in 1977 and played a major role in helping the Soviet Union become a dominant team in the late 1970s to early 1980s. He won gold medals in the 1977 FIVB World Cup in Japan, 1978 FIVB World Championship in Italy, 1980 Summer Olympics in Moscow, 1981 FIVB World Cup in Japan, and 1982 FIVB World Championship in Argentina.

In the 1986 Goodwill Games in Moscow, Zaytsev led the Soviet team to the gold medal by defeating the United States in the final.

In 1988, Zaytsev was a member of the Soviet team that won the silver medal in the Olympic tournament in Seoul.

Among his achievements, Zaytsev also led the Soviet Union to six European Championship gold medals.

In 2013, Zaytsev was inducted into the International Volleyball Hall of Fame.

== Club volleyball ==
Zaytsev played for Avtomobilist Leningrad, with which he won two CEV Cup Winners' Cups in 1982–1983. He finished his career in Italy, playing in Spoleto, Agrigento, and Città di Castello.

== Personal life and death ==
Zaytsev was born in Leningrad. He was married to Irina Pozdnyakova, a former competitive swimmer. They had a daughter, Anna (born 1975), and a son, Ivan, who is an Olympic volleyball player. Both children hold Italian citizenship: Ivan was born on 2 October 1988 in Italy, where his father played for several years, whereas Anna married an Italian in 1993.

Zaytsev died on 12 June 2023, at the age of 70.
