= Claudina Villaurrutia =

Cuban volleyball player

Personal information
- Full name: Claudina Villaurrutia García
- Born: 17 May 1955 (age 71); Cárdenas, Matanzas, Republic of Cuba
- Height: 1.82 m (6 ft 0 in)

Volleyball information
- Number: 2 (1972); 8 (1976)

National team
1972-1978	Cuba
Honours
Women's volleyball
Representing Cuba
Pan American Games
Gold medal – first place	1975 Mexico City	Team
Central American and Caribbean Games
Gold medal – first place	1974 Santo Domingo	Team

Claudina Villaurrutia (born 17 May 1955) is a retired Cuban volleyball player who competed with the Cuban women's national volleyball team at the 1972 and 1976 Summer Olympics. She won a gold medal with the Cuban team at the 1975 Pan American Games.
