= Ramon Pena =

Ramon Pena can refer to:

- Ramon Peña (born 1953), Cuban Olympic water polo player
- Ramón Peña (born 1962), Dominican Republic baseball player
- Ramón González Peña (1888 – 1952), Asturian socialist
