= Melania Tartabull =

Cuban volleyball player

Personal information
- Full name: Melania Tartabull Carrasco
- Nationality: Cuban
- Born: 22 October 1955 (age 71)
- Height: 1.80 m (5 ft 11 in)

Volleyball information
- Number: 9

National team
1974–1978	Cuba
Honours
Women's volleyball
Representing Cuba
Pan American Games
Gold medal – first place	1975 Mexico City	Team
Central American and Caribbean Games
Gold medal – first place	1974 Santo Domingo	Team
Gold medal – first place	1978 Medellín	Team

Melania Tartabull (born 22 October 1955) is a Cuban former volleyball player. She competed in the women's tournament at the 1976 Summer Olympics in Montreal, Canada. She also helped the Cuban team win the gold medal at the 1975 Pan American Games in Mexico City, Mexico.
