= Lorenzo Martínez (volleyball) =

Cuban volleyball player

Lorenzo Martínez Cordero

Personal information
- Full name: Lorenzo Martínez Cordero
- Born: 5 September 1951 (age 75); Esmeralda, Camagüey Province, Cuba
- Height: 1.81 m (5 ft 11 in)

Volleyball information
- Position: Setter
- Number: 11 (1972); 8 (1976)

National team
1971–1976	Cuba
Honours
Men's volleyball
Representing Cuba
Olympic Games
Bronze medal – third place	1976 Montreal	Team
Pan American Games
Gold medal – first place	1971 Cali	Team
Central American and Caribbean Games
Gold medal – first place	1974 Santo Domingo	Team

Lorenzo Martínez Cordero (born 5 September 1951), more commonly known as Lorenzo Martínez, is a Cuban former volleyball player who competed in the 1972 and 1976 Summer Olympics. He was a setter.

In 1972, Martínez was part of the Cuban team that finished tenth in the Olympic tournament. He played five matches. Four years later, he won the bronze medal with the Cuban team in the 1976 Olympic tournament. He played all six matches.

== Personal life ==
Martínez married Ana María García, who played for the Cuban women's national volleyball team.
