= Tartabull =

Tartabull is a surname. Notable people with the surname include:

- Danny Tartabull (born 1962), Cuban-Puerto Rican baseball player, son of José
- José Tartabull (born 1938), Cuban baseball player
- Melania Tartabull (born 1955), Cuban volleyball player
