= Volleyball World Championship =

Volleyball World Championship may refer to

- FIVB Men's Volleyball World Cup, known as the FIVB Men's Volleyball World Championship until 2025
- FIVB Women's Volleyball World Cup, known as the FIVB Women's Volleyball World Championship until 2025

== See also ==
- Volleyball World Cup
