= 1981 FIVB Volleyball Men's World Cup =

1981 Men's World Cup
Tournament details
- Host country: Japan
- Dates: 19–28 November
- Teams: 8
- Venues: 4 (in 4 host cities)

Final positions
- Champions: Soviet Union (3rd title)
- Runners-up: Cuba
- Third place: Brazil
- Fourth place: Poland

Tournament awards
- MVP: (Soviet Union) Vyacheslav Zaytsev

The 1981 FIVB Men's World Cup was held from 19 to 28 November 1981 in Japan. It was the 4th edition of the competition.

== Qualification ==
Means of qualification	Date	Host	Vacancies	Qualified
Host Country	—	―	1	Japan
Volleyball at the 1980 Summer Olympics	20 Jul – 1 Aug 1980	(Soviet Union) Moscow	1	Soviet Union
1978 FIVB Volleyball Men's World Championship	20 September – 1 October 1978	Italy	1	Italy
1981 Men's European Volleyball Championship	19–27 September 1981	Bulgaria	1	Poland
1981 Men's NORCECA Volleyball Championship	4–10 July 1981	Mexico City	1	Cuba
1981 Men's South American Volleyball Championship	12–19 July 1981	(Chile) Santiago	1	Brazil
Asian Qualifier	14–23 March 1981	Hong Kong	1	China
1979 Men's African Volleyball Championship	9–15 November 1979	(Libya) Tripoli	1	Tunisia
Total			8	

== Results ==
Pos	Team	Pld	W	L	Pts	SW	SL	SR	SPW	SPL	SPR
1	Soviet Union	7	7	0	14	21	2	10.500	338	188	1.798
2	Cuba	7	6	1	13	18	9	2.000	364	283	1.286
3	Brazil	7	5	2	12	16	11	1.455	352	316	1.114
4	Poland	7	4	3	11	14	13	1.077	313	320	0.978
5	China	7	3	4	10	12	14	0.857	328	307	1.068
6	Japan	7	2	5	9	12	15	0.800	326	306	1.065
7	Italy	7	1	6	8	9	18	0.500	275	358	0.768
8	Tunisia	7	0	7	7	1	21	0.048	110	328	0.335

Location: Fukuoka

Date		Score		Set 1	Set 2	Set 3	Set 4	Set 5	Total
19 Nov	Soviet Union	3–0	Brazil	15–6	15–4	15–5			45–15
19 Nov	Japan	3–0	Italy	15–10	15–13	15–5			45–28
19 Nov	Poland	3–0	Tunisia	15–3	15–8	15–2			45–13
19 Nov	Cuba	3–2	China	11–15	15–13	11–15	15–11	15–9	67–63
20 Nov	Soviet Union	3–0	China	15–11	15–11	15–12			45–34
20 Nov	Cuba	3–0	Tunisia	15–6	15–4	15–4			45–14
20 Nov	Poland	3–2	Italy	15–7	15–10	10–15	11–15	15–6	66–53
20 Nov	Brazil	3–1	Japan	15–10	10–15	15–8	15–11		55–44

Location: Hiroshima and Matsuyama

Date		Score		Set 1	Set 2	Set 3	Set 4	Set 5	Total
22 Nov	Brazil	3–2	Italy	13–15	14–16	15–6	15–12	15–8	72–57
22 Nov	Cuba	3–0	Poland	16–14	15–4	15–3			46–21
22 Nov	Soviet Union	3–0	Tunisia	15–4	15–8	15–2			45–14
22 Nov	China	3–1	Japan	15–12	2–15	15–8	15–9		47–44

Location: Gifu

Date		Score		Set 1	Set 2	Set 3	Set 4	Set 5	Total
24 Nov	Brazil	3–1	China	12–15	15–12	15–12	15–12		57–51
24 Nov	Cuba	3–1	Italy	14–16	15–10	15–2	15–3		59–31
24 Nov	Soviet Union	3–2	Poland	8–15	15–11	15–4	13–15	15–4	66–49
24 Nov	Japan	3–0	Tunisia	15–1	15–1	15–6			45–8

Location: Tokyo

Date		Score		Set 1	Set 2	Set 3	Set 4	Set 5	Total
26 Nov	Soviet Union	3–0	Cuba	15–3	17–15	15–11			47–29
26 Nov	Poland	3–2	Japan	15–13	3–15	8–15	15–8	15–13	56–64

Location: Yokohama

Date		Score		Set 1	Set 2	Set 3	Set 4	Set 5	Total
26 Nov	China	3–1	Italy	15–13	15–5	10–15	15–8		55–41
26 Nov	Brazil	3–1	Tunisia	15–3	15–9	13–15	15–10		58–37

Location: Tokyo

Date		Score		Set 1	Set 2	Set 3	Set 4	Set 5	Total
27 Nov	Soviet Union	3–0	Italy	15–6	15–5	15–9			45–20
27 Nov	Cuba	3–2	Japan	15–8	12–15	15–12	10–15	15–7	67–57
27 Nov	China	3–0	Tunisia	15–?	15–?	15–?			45–8
27 Nov	Brazil	3–0	Poland	15–10	15–11	15–10			45–31
28 Nov	Italy	3–0	Tunisia	15–3	15–8	15–5			45–16
28 Nov	Poland	3–0	China	15–11	15–11	15–11			45–33
28 Nov	Cuba	3–1	Brazil	5–15	15–10	16–14	15–11		51–50
28 Nov	Soviet Union	3–0	Japan	15–5	15–11	15–11			45–27

== Final standing ==
Rank	Team
1st place, gold medalist(s)	Soviet Union
2nd place, silver medalist(s)	Cuba
3rd place, bronze medalist(s)	Brazil
4	Poland
5	China
6	Japan
7	Italy
8	Tunisia

1981 Men's World Cup champions

Soviet Union
3rd title

Team roster
Vyacheslav Zaytsev, Vladimir Kondra, Aleksandr Borisovich Savin, Viljar Loor, Vladimir Dorokhov, Yury Panchenko, Pāvels Seļivanovs, Oleg Moliboga, Vladimir Shkurikhin, Yury Kuznetsov, Aleksandr Sapega, Pavel Voronkov
Head coach
Viacheslav Platonov

== Awards ==
- Most valuable player
  (Soviet Union) Vyacheslav Zaytsev
- Best spiker
  (Cuba) Raúl Vilches
- Best blocker
  (Soviet Union) Aleksandr Borisovich Savin
- Best setter
  (China) Shen Fu Lin
- Best defender
  (Brazil) Renan Dal Zotto
- Best on the pitch
  (Japan) Haruhiko Hanawa
