= Volleyball World Cup =

Volleyball World Cup may refer to

- FIVB Men's Volleyball World Cup, known as the FIVB Men's Volleyball World Championship until 2025
- FIVB Women's Volleyball World Cup, known as the FIVB Women's Volleyball World Championship until 2025
- FIVB Men's Volleyball World Cup (1965–2019)
- FIVB Women's Volleyball World Cup (1973–2019)
