= Eugenio Almenteros =

Cuban water polo player (born 1952)

Personal information
- Nationality: Cuban
- Born: 3 January 1952 (age 73)

Sport
- Sport: Water polo

Eugenio Almenteros (born 3 January 1952) is a Cuban water polo player. He competed at the 1972 Summer Olympics and the 1976 Summer Olympics.
