= David Rodríguez (water polo) =

Cuban water polo player (born 1955)

Personal information
- Nationality: Cuban
- Born: 30 May 1955 (age 69)

Sport
- Sport: Water polo

David Rodríguez (born 30 May 1955) is a Cuban water polo player. He competed at the 1972 Summer Olympics, the 1976 Summer Olympics and the 1980 Summer Olympics.
