= Lazaro Mora =

Cuban fencer (born 1954)

Personal information
- Born: 30 September 1954 (age 71)

Sport
- Sport: Fencing

Lazaro Mora (born 30 September 1954) is a Cuban fencer. He competed in the team sabre event at the 1976 Summer Olympics.
