= Ramón Hernández (fencer) =

Cuban fencer (born 1953)

Personal information
- Born: 1 July 1953
- Died: January 2016 (aged 62)

Sport
- Sport: Fencing

Ramón Hernández (1 July 1953 – January 2016) was a Cuban fencer. He competed in the team sabre event at the 1976 Summer Olympics.
