= Tomasz Wójtowicz =

Polish volleyball player (1953–2022)

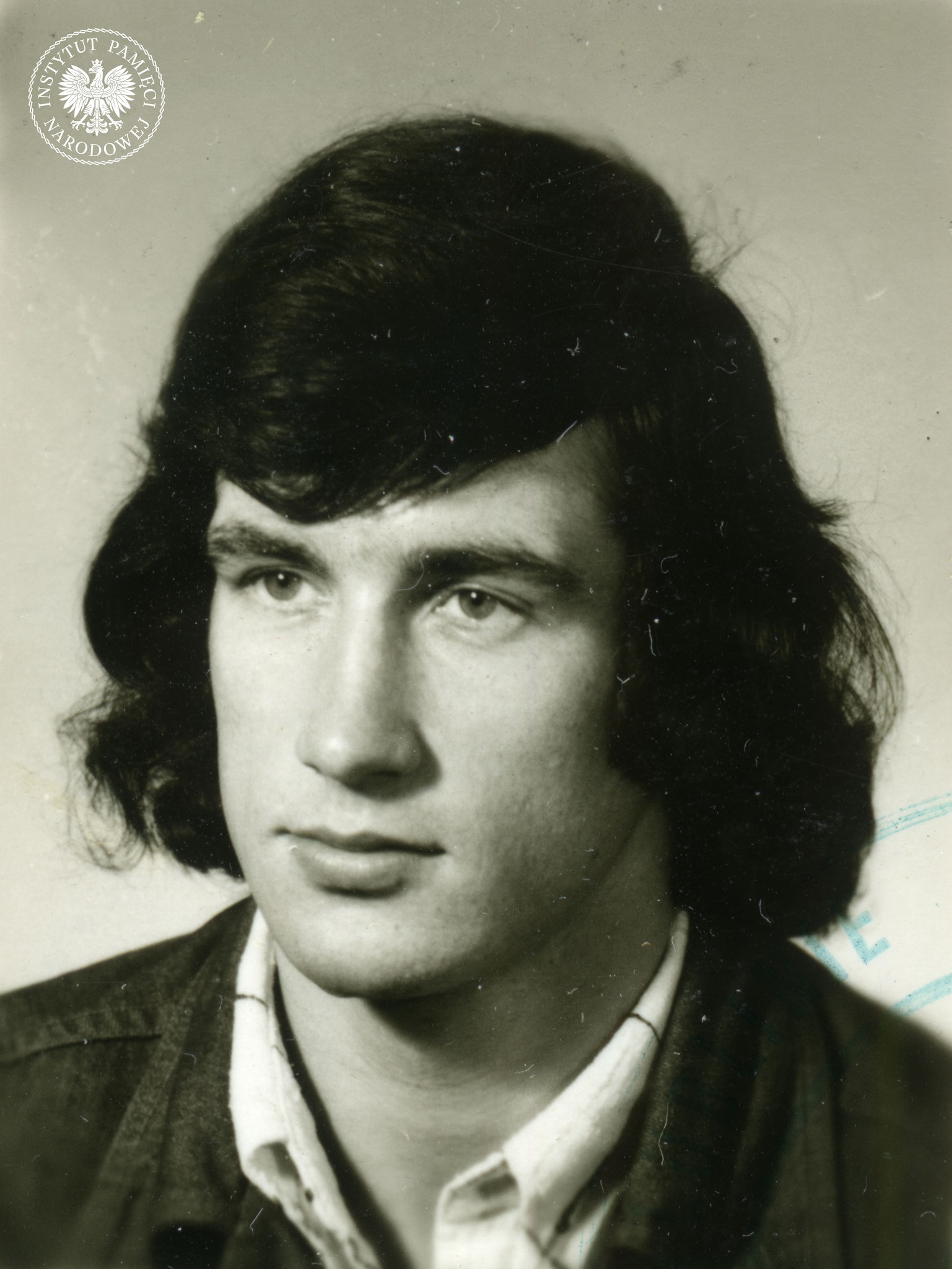

Personal information
- Full name: Tomasz Grzegorz Wójtowicz
- Born: 22 September 1953; Lublin, Poland
- Died: 24 October 2022 (aged 69)
- Height: 1.98 m (6 ft 6 in)

Career
Years	Teams
1968–1972; 1972–1978; 1978–1983; 1983–1984; 1984–1986; 1986–1987; 1987–1989	AZS Lublin; Avia Świdnik; Legia Warsaw; Edilcuoghi Sassuolo; Santal Parma; Granarolo Ferrara; Famila Città di Castello

National team
1973–1984	Poland (325)
Honours
Men's volleyball
Representing Poland
Olympic Games
Gold medal – first place	1976 Montreal
FIVB World Championship
Gold medal – first place	1974 Mexico
CEV European Championship
Silver medal – second place	1975 Yugoslavia
Silver medal – second place	1977 Finland
Silver medal – second place	1979 France
Silver medal – second place	1983 East Germany

Tomasz Grzegorz Wójtowicz (22 September 1953 – 24 October 2022) was a Polish volleyball player. In his later life, he worked as a volleyball commentator. As a member of the Poland national team, he won the titles of the 1976 Olympic Champion and the 1974 World Champion.

Wójtowicz was considered one of the first volleyball players in the world to start attacking from the back row. In 2001, he was listed by the International Volleyball Federation as one of the top eight volleyball players in the world. In 2002, he became the first Polish volleyball player to be inducted into the Volleyball Hall of Fame.

Wójtowicz died after a long illness on 24 October 2022, at the age of 69.

== Honours ==
=== Club ===
- CEV European Champions Cup
  - 1984–85 – with Santal Parma
  - 1985–86 – with Santal Parma
- Domestic
  - 1982–83 Polish Championship, with Legia Warsaw

=== Youth national team ===
- 1971 CEV U20 European Championship

=== Individual awards ===
- 1977: FIVB World Cup – Most valuable player
- 1977: FIVB World Cup – Best blocker

=== State awards ===
- 2021: Commander's Cross of Polonia Restituta
