= Ramon Peña =

Cuban water polo player (born 1953)

Personal information
- Nationality: Cuban
- Born: 10 September 1953 (age 71)

Sport
- Sport: Water polo

Ramon Peña (born 10 September 1953) is a Cuban water polo player. He competed in the men's tournament at the 1976 Summer Olympics.
