= 1977 FIVB Volleyball Men's World Cup =

1977 Men's World Cup
Tournament details
- Host country: Japan
- Dates: 17–29 November
- Teams: 12
- Venues: 6 (in 6 host cities)

Final positions
- Champions: Soviet Union (2nd title)
- Runners-up: Japan
- Third place: Cuba
- Fourth place: Poland

Tournament awards
- MVP: (Poland) Tomasz Wójtowicz

The 1977 FIVB Men's World Cup was held from 17 to 29 November 1977 in Japan. It was the 3rd edition of the competition.

The FIVB Men's World Cup made its final breakthrough when the decision was taken to hold the competition in Japan from that point on. The tournament was held there for the first time in 1977, and the mix of competitors from around the world was the most varied it had ever been. Only three of the twelve participating teams were from Europe. Soviet Union won their second title of World Cup.

== Qualification ==
| Means of qualification | Date | Host | Vacancies | Qualified |
|---|---|---|---|---|
| Host country | — | ― | 1 | Japan |
| 1977 Men's European Volleyball Championship | 25 Sep – 2 Oct 1977 | Finland | 3 | Soviet Union |
| 1977 Men's European Volleyball Championship | 25 Sep – 2 Oct 1977 | Finland | 3 | Poland |
| 1977 Men's European Volleyball Championship | 25 Sep – 2 Oct 1977 | Finland | 3 | ~~Romania~~; Bulgaria* |
| 1975 Men's European Volleyball Championship | 18–25 Oct 1975 | Yugoslavia | 1 | ~~Yugoslavia~~; United States* |
| 1977 Men's NORCECA Volleyball Championship | 1977 | (Dominican Republic) Santo Domingo | 3 | Cuba |
| 1977 Men's NORCECA Volleyball Championship | 1977 | (Dominican Republic) Santo Domingo | 3 | Mexico |
| 1977 Men's NORCECA Volleyball Championship | 1977 | (Dominican Republic) Santo Domingo | 3 | Canada |
| Asian Qualifier | 16–21 November 1976 | Hong Kong | 2 | South Korea |
| Asian Qualifier | 16–21 November 1976 | Hong Kong | 2 | China |
| 1977 Men's South American Volleyball Championship | 26 Feb – 5 Mar 1977 | Peru | 1 | Brazil |
| 1976 Men's African Volleyball Championship | 1976 | (Tunisia) Tunis | 1 | Egypt |
| Total | | | 12 | |

* Romania and Yugoslavia were replaced by Bulgaria and United States.

== Results ==
=== First round ===
==== Pool A ====
Location: Fukuoka

| Pos | Team | Pld | W | L | Pts | SW | SL | SR | SPW | SPL | SPR | Qualification |
|---|---|---|---|---|---|---|---|---|---|---|---|---|
| 1 | Japan | 2 | 2 | 0 | 4 | 6 | 2 | 3.000 | 113 | 75 | 1.507 | 1st–8th pools |
| 2 | Brazil | 2 | 1 | 1 | 3 | 5 | 3 | 1.667 | 99 | 91 | 1.088 | 1st–8th pools |
| 3 | United States | 2 | 0 | 2 | 2 | 0 | 6 | 0.000 | 44 | 90 | 0.489 | 9th–12th places |

| Date | | Score | | Set 1 | Set 2 | Set 3 | Set 4 | Set 5 | Total |
|---|---|---|---|---|---|---|---|---|---|
| 17 Nov | Brazil | 3–0 | United States | 15–8 | 15–8 | 15–7 | | | 45–23 |
| 18 Nov | Japan | 3–0 | United States | 15–7 | 15–9 | 15–5 | | | 45–21 |
| 19 Nov | Japan | 3–2 | Brazil | 13–15 | 10–15 | 15–9 | 15–10 | 15–5 | 68–54 |

==== Pool B ====
Location: Toyama

| Pos | Team | Pld | W | L | Pts | SW | SL | SR | SPW | SPL | SPR | Qualification |
|---|---|---|---|---|---|---|---|---|---|---|---|---|
| 1 | Poland | 2 | 2 | 0 | 4 | 6 | 1 | 6.000 | 97 | 58 | 1.672 | 1st–8th pools |
| 2 | China | 2 | 1 | 1 | 3 | 4 | 3 | 1.333 | 80 | 68 | 1.176 | 1st–8th pools |
| 3 | Canada | 2 | 0 | 2 | 2 | 0 | 6 | 0.000 | 39 | 90 | 0.433 | 9th–12th places |

| Date | | Score | | Set 1 | Set 2 | Set 3 | Set 4 | Set 5 | Total |
|---|---|---|---|---|---|---|---|---|---|
| 17 Nov | China | 3–0 | Canada | 15–5 | 15–3 | 15–8 | | | 45–16 |
| 18 Nov | Poland | 3–0 | Canada | 15–13 | 15–7 | 15–3 | | | 45–23 |
| 19 Nov | Poland | 3–1 | China | 15–5 | 15–8 | 7–15 | 15–7 | | 52–35 |

==== Pool C ====
Location: Sapporo

| Pos | Team | Pld | W | L | Pts | SW | SL | SR | SPW | SPL | SPR | Qualification |
|---|---|---|---|---|---|---|---|---|---|---|---|---|
| 1 | Soviet Union | 2 | 2 | 0 | 4 | 6 | 0 | MAX | 90 | 50 | 1.800 | 1st–8th pools |
| 2 | South Korea | 2 | 1 | 1 | 3 | 3 | 3 | 1.000 | 77 | 68 | 1.132 | 1st–8th pools |
| 3 | Mexico | 2 | 0 | 2 | 2 | 0 | 6 | 0.000 | 41 | 90 | 0.456 | 9th–12th places |

| Date | | Score | | Set 1 | Set 2 | Set 3 | Set 4 | Set 5 | Total |
|---|---|---|---|---|---|---|---|---|---|
| 17 Nov | Soviet Union | 3–0 | South Korea | 15–9 | 15–12 | 15–11 | | | 45–32 |
| 18 Nov | South Korea | 3–0 | Mexico | 15–13 | 15–3 | 15–7 | | | 45–23 |
| 19 Nov | Soviet Union | 3–0 | Mexico | 15–4 | 15–7 | 15–7 | | | 45–18 |

==== Pool D ====
Location: Sendai

| Pos | Team | Pld | W | L | Pts | SW | SL | SR | SPW | SPL | SPR | Qualification |
|---|---|---|---|---|---|---|---|---|---|---|---|---|
| 1 | Cuba | 2 | 2 | 0 | 4 | 6 | 1 | 6.000 | 96 | 47 | 2.043 | 1st–8th pools |
| 2 | Bulgaria | 2 | 1 | 1 | 3 | 4 | 3 | 1.333 | 80 | 64 | 1.250 | 1st–8th pools |
| 3 | Egypt | 2 | 0 | 2 | 2 | 0 | 6 | 0.000 | 25 | 90 | 0.278 | 9th–12th places |

| Date | | Score | | Set 1 | Set 2 | Set 3 | Set 4 | Set 5 | Total |
|---|---|---|---|---|---|---|---|---|---|
| 17 Nov | Cuba | 3–1 | Bulgaria | 15–5 | 6–15 | 15–7 | 15–8 | | 51–35 |
| 18 Nov | Cuba | 3–0 | Egypt | 15–8 | 15–1 | 15–3 | | | 45–12 |
| 19 Nov | Bulgaria | 3–0 | Egypt | 15–4 | 15–1 | 15–8 | | | 45–13 |

=== Second round ===
==== Pool E ====
Location: Nagoya

| Pos | Team | Pld | W | L | Pts | SW | SL | SR | SPW | SPL | SPR | Qualification |
|---|---|---|---|---|---|---|---|---|---|---|---|---|
| 1 | Cuba | 3 | 3 | 0 | 6 | 9 | 3 | 3.000 | 167 | 141 | 1.184 | Final places |
| 2 | Japan | 3 | 2 | 1 | 5 | 8 | 6 | 1.333 | 168 | 148 | 1.135 | Final places |
| 3 | China | 3 | 1 | 2 | 4 | 6 | 6 | 1.000 | 141 | 146 | 0.966 | 5th–8th places |
| 4 | South Korea | 3 | 0 | 3 | 3 | 1 | 9 | 0.111 | 103 | 144 | 0.715 | 5th–8th places |

| Date | | Score | | Set 1 | Set 2 | Set 3 | Set 4 | Set 5 | Total |
|---|---|---|---|---|---|---|---|---|---|
| 22 Nov | Japan | 3–2 | China | 15–9 | 15–8 | 14–16 | 15–9 | | 59–42 |
| 22 Nov | Cuba | 3–0 | South Korea | 15–7 | 15–12 | 15–13 | | | 45–32 |
| 23 Nov | Japan | 3–1 | South Korea | 15–11 | 8–15 | 15–6 | 15–10 | | 53–42 |
| 23 Nov | Cuba | 3–1 | China | 15–13 | 13–15 | 15–13 | 15–12 | | 58–53 |
| 24 Nov | China | 3–0 | South Korea | 15–12 | 15–3 | 16–14 | | | 46–29 |
| 24 Nov | Cuba | 3–2 | Japan | 15–8 | 7–15 | 12–15 | 15–7 | 15–11 | 64–56 |

==== Pool F ====
Location: Hiroshima

| Pos | Team | Pld | W | L | Pts | SW | SL | SR | SPW | SPL | SPR | Qualification |
|---|---|---|---|---|---|---|---|---|---|---|---|---|
| 1 | Poland | 3 | 3 | 0 | 6 | 9 | 4 | 2.250 | 177 | 126 | 1.405 | Final places |
| 2 | Soviet Union | 3 | 2 | 1 | 5 | 8 | 4 | 2.000 | 159 | 129 | 1.233 | Final places |
| 3 | Brazil | 3 | 1 | 2 | 4 | 4 | 6 | 0.667 | 103 | 127 | 0.811 | 5th–8th places |
| 4 | Bulgaria | 3 | 0 | 3 | 3 | 2 | 9 | 0.222 | 100 | 157 | 0.637 | 5th–8th places |

| Date | | Score | | Set 1 | Set 2 | Set 3 | Set 4 | Set 5 | Total |
|---|---|---|---|---|---|---|---|---|---|
| 22 Nov | Poland | 3–1 | Bulgaria | 13–15 | 15–11 | 15–8 | 15–4 | | 58–38 |
| 22 Nov | Soviet Union | 3–0 | Brazil | 15–11 | 15–9 | 15–10 | | | 45–30 |
| 23 Nov | Poland | 3–1 | Brazil | 15–4 | 15–0 | 9–15 | 15–9 | | 54–28 |
| 23 Nov | Soviet Union | 3–1 | Bulgaria | 9–15 | 15–3 | 15–11 | 15–5 | | 54–34 |
| 24 Nov | Brazil | 3–0 | Bulgaria | 15–7 | 15–10 | 15–11 | | | 45–28 |
| 24 Nov | Poland | 3–2 | Soviet Union | 15–12 | 15–5 | 13–15 | 7–15 | 15–13 | 65–60 |

==== 9th–12th places ====
Location: Sapporo

| Pos | Team | Pld | W | L | Pts | SW | SL | SR | SPW | SPL | SPR |
|---|---|---|---|---|---|---|---|---|---|---|---|
| 9 | Mexico | 3 | 3 | 0 | 6 | 9 | 1 | 9.000 | 153 | 84 | 1.821 |
| 10 | United States | 3 | 2 | 1 | 5 | 6 | 4 | 1.500 | 124 | 102 | 1.216 |
| 11 | Egypt | 3 | 1 | 2 | 4 | 3 | 7 | 0.429 | 89 | 145 | 0.614 |
| 12 | Canada | 3 | 0 | 3 | 3 | 3 | 9 | 0.333 | 135 | 170 | 0.794 |

| Date | | Score | | Set 1 | Set 2 | Set 3 | Set 4 | Set 5 | Total |
|---|---|---|---|---|---|---|---|---|---|
| 22 Nov | Mexico | 3–1 | Canada | 15–10 | 15–4 | 13–15 | 15–10 | | 58–39 |
| 22 Nov | United States | 3–0 | Egypt | 15–6 | 15–2 | 15–3 | | | 45–11 |
| 23 Nov | Mexico | 3–0 | United States | 15–7 | 15–8 | 15–5 | | | 45–20 |
| 23 Nov | Egypt | 3–1 | Canada | 15–10 | 8–15 | 15–12 | 15–13 | | 53–50 |
| 24 Nov | United States | 3–1 | Canada | 15–11 | 14–16 | 15–10 | 15–9 | | 59–46 |
| 24 Nov | Mexico | 3–0 | Egypt | 15–3 | 20–18 | 15–4 | | | 50–25 |

=== Final round ===
==== 5th–8th places ====
Location: Tokyo

| Pos | Team | Pld | W | L | Pts | SW | SL | SR | SPW | SPL | SPR |
|---|---|---|---|---|---|---|---|---|---|---|---|
| 5 | China | 3 | 2 | 1 | 5 | 7 | 3 | 2.333 | 131 | 112 | 1.170 |
| 6 | Bulgaria | 3 | 2 | 1 | 5 | 6 | 5 | 1.200 | 131 | 120 | 1.092 |
| 7 | South Korea | 3 | 1 | 2 | 4 | 5 | 6 | 0.833 | 141 | 132 | 1.068 |
| 8 | Brazil | 3 | 1 | 2 | 4 | 4 | 8 | 0.500 | 130 | 169 | 0.769 |

| Date | | Score | | Set 1 | Set 2 | Set 3 | Set 4 | Set 5 | Total |
|---|---|---|---|---|---|---|---|---|---|
| 27 Nov | China | 3–0 | South Korea | 15–9 | 15–11 | 15–10 | | | 45–30 |
| 27 Nov | Bulgaria | 3–1 | Brazil | 12–15 | 15–11 | 15–5 | 15–4 | | 57–35 |
| 28 Nov | China | 3–0 | Brazil | 15–8 | 15–6 | 16–14 | | | 46–28 |
| 28 Nov | South Korea | 3–0 | Bulgaria | 15–7 | 15–8 | 15–5 | | | 45–20 |
| 29 Nov | Brazil | 3–2 | South Korea | 15–10 | 10–15 | 15–12 | 11–15 | 16–14 | 67–66 |
| 29 Nov | Bulgaria | 3–1 | China | 9–15 | 15–8 | 15–8 | 15–9 | | 54–40 |

==== Final places ====
Location: Tokyo

| Pos | Team | Pld | W | L | Pts | SW | SL | SR | SPW | SPL | SPR |
|---|---|---|---|---|---|---|---|---|---|---|---|
| 1 | Soviet Union | 3 | 3 | 0 | 6 | 9 | 1 | 9.000 | 149 | 70 | 2.129 |
| 2 | Japan | 3 | 1 | 2 | 4 | 5 | 6 | 0.833 | 0 | 0 | — |
| 3 | Cuba | 3 | 1 | 2 | 4 | 4 | 6 | 0.667 | 100 | 138 | 0.725 |
| 4 | Poland | 3 | 1 | 2 | 4 | 3 | 8 | 0.375 | 0 | 0 | — |

| Date | | Score | | Set 1 | Set 2 | Set 3 | Set 4 | Set 5 | Total |
|---|---|---|---|---|---|---|---|---|---|
| 27 Nov | Soviet Union | 3–1 | Cuba | 14–16 | 15–7 | 15–2 | 15–6 | | 59–31 |
| 27 Nov | Poland | 3–2 | Japan | 15–17 | 15–6 | 15–11 | 8–15 | 15–12 | 68–61 |
| 28 Nov | Soviet Union | 3–0 | Poland | 15–7 | 15–9 | 15–5 | | | 45–21 |
| 28 Nov | Japan | 3–0 | Cuba | 15–10 | 15–6 | 15–6 | | | 45–22 |
| 29 Nov | Cuba | 3–0 | Poland | 15–13 | 15–6 | 17–15 | | | 47–34 |
| 29 Nov | Soviet Union | 3–0 | Japan | 15–6 | 15–2 | 15–10 | | | 45–18 |

== Final standing ==
| Rank | Team |
|---|---|
| 1st place, gold medalist(s) | Soviet Union |
| 2nd place, silver medalist(s) | Japan |
| 3rd place, bronze medalist(s) | Cuba |
| 4 | Poland |
| 5 | China |
| 6 | Bulgaria |
| 7 | South Korea |
| 8 | Brazil |
| 9 | Mexico |
| 10 | United States |
| 11 | Egypt |
| 12 | Canada |

1977 Men's World Cup champions

Soviet Union
2nd title

Team roster
Vladimir Kondra, Vyacheslav Zaytsev, Vladimir Ulanov, Anatoliy Polishchuk, Vladimir Chernyshyov, Aleksandr Borisovich Savin, Viljar Loor, Vladimir Dorokhov, Pāvels Seļivanovs, Oleg Moliboga, Fedir Lashchonov, Fedor Burchukov
Head coach
Viacheslav Platonov

== Awards ==
- Most valuable player
  (Poland) Tomasz Wójtowicz
- Best spiker
  (Soviet Union) Aleksandr Borisovich Savin
- Best blocker
  (Poland) Tomasz Wójtowicz
- Best setter
  (Japan) Katsutoshi Nekoda
- Best Defender
  (Soviet Union) Vyacheslav Zaytsev
- Best on the pitch
  (Japan) Haruhiko Hanawa
