= FIVB Men's Volleyball World Cup (1965–2019) =

Former volleyball tournament

- Most recent season or competition: 2019 FIVB Volleyball Men's World Cup
- Sport: Volleyball
- Founded: 1965; 61 years ago
- First season: 1965
- Folded: 2019; 7 years ago
- Replaced by: FIVB Men's Volleyball World Cup (2027–present)
- No. of teams: 12
- Continent: International (FIVB)
- Last champions: Brazil (3rd title)
- Most titles: Soviet Union (4 titles)
- Streaming partner: VBTV (2019)

The FIVB Volleyball Men's World Cup was an international volleyball competition contested by the senior men's national teams of the members of Fédération Internationale de Volleyball (FIVB), the sport's global governing body, from 1965 to 2019. Initially, the tournament was played in the year following the Olympic Games, except for 1973 when no tournament was held, but between 1991 and 2019, the World Cup was awarded in the year preceding the Olympic Games.

The last champion was Brazil, who won their third title at the 2019 tournament, which featured twelve teams. The World Cup (with the exception of the 2019 edition) acted as the first qualification event for the following year's Olympic Games with the top two teams qualifying.

There were a total of 14 World Cups, with six different national teams winning the tournament. Russia is the most successful team with six titles (four as Soviet Union). The other World Cup winners were Brazil with three titles, the United States with two titles, followed by Cuba, Italy and East Germany with one title each.

== History ==
The World Cup was created in 1965 with the purpose of partially filling the gap between the two most important volleyball tournaments, the Olympic Games and the World Championship, which take place in alternating four-year cycles. The establishment of a third international competition would leave only one in every four years with no major events. The World Cup has a smaller entry than the World Championship, with at most twelve teams.

The World Cup was to be held in the year following the Olympic Games. The first two tournaments were for men's volleyball only; in 1973, a women's tournament was also introduced. Originally, each tournament had a different host, but in 1977 the competition was transferred to Japan on a permanent basis.

In the 1990s, the installment of annual international events such as the World League and the Grand Prix made the original motivations for the creation of the World Cup obsolete. Instead of letting a consolidated event disappear for lack of interest, the FIVB decided to change its format in 1991: it would be held in the year preceding, and not following, the Olympic Games; and it would be considered a first international Olympic qualification tournament, granting the winners a direct berth in the games.

This move saved the competition. The possibility of securing an early berth for the Olympic Games, thus avoiding extraneous and in some cases tight continental qualification procedures, became a consistent motivation for the national federations to participate in the World Cup. In 1995, the number of Olympic spots granted at the competition was increased to three, as it remained until 2011. In 2015 the number of spots was only two again.

=== Winners ===
Russia (considered as the inheritors of the records of the former Soviet Union), Brazil and United States are the only teams that have won the Men's World Cup more than once.

The Soviets took the gold at the opening edition of the tournament, in 1965. Four years later, the winner was also a socialist nation, East Germany.

Scheduled for Uruguay, the 1973 edition was cancelled. In 1977, competition was resumed in Japan, and the Soviet Union came back for two wins in a row. In 1985, they were once again runners-up, but lost the decisive match to United States in five sets. In 1989, Cuba surprised the world and beat a rising Italy to take the gold.

With the competition now set as a qualifying event for the Olympic Games, the Soviet Union, led by Dmitri Fomin won the title in 1991, at the brink of dissolution. The Italians, who hadn't participated in this edition, finally conquered their gold medal in 1995. Inheriting a large part of the former Soviet volleyball programme, Russia were the winners in 1999.

The following two editions, played in 2003 and 2007 respectively, were won by favorites Brazil. In 2011, Russia regained the title, while the 2015 edition was won by the United States for the second time. Brazil won the title for the third time in 2019.

== Competition formula ==
The former World Cup was the most stable from all competition formulas employed by the FIVB. The following rules applied:

- The competition took place in Japan.
- Twelve teams participated in each event: ten qualified, two per invitation.
  - Japan were always pre-qualified as host nation.
  - The winners of the FIVB World Championship in the previous year were automatically granted a spot.
  - The champion and runner-up of each continental tournament of that year were granted two spots.
  - Since the 1999 edition, only teams not yet qualified for the following Olympic Games can compete in the World Cup; hence hosts of the following year's Olympic Games are not allowed to compete. There was an exception for the 2019 World Cup, as the tournament was hosted by Japan and the country hosted the 2020 Summer Olympics.
- The competition was divided in exactly two phases (called "legs").
  - Teams were divided in two pools.
  - At the first leg, each team played one match against all other teams in its pool.
  - At the second leg, each team played one match against all the teams in the other pool.
  - Matches took place continuously through two weeks, with one-day breaks every two or three days. Each day, six matches were played.
  - Final standings were calculated by usual volleyball criteria: match points, numbers of matches won, sets ratio (the total number of sets won divided by the total number of sets lost), points ratio, direct confrontation.
- Top two teams in overall standings, regardless of pools, qualified for the following Olympic Games.
- The tournament implemented very tight line-up restrictions: only twelve players were allowed, and no replacement was permitted, even in the case of injuries.

== Results summary ==
Ed.	Year	Host	Champions	Runners-up	Third place	Fourth place	Teams
1	1965	Poland	Soviet Union	Poland	Czechoslovakia	Japan	11
2	1969	East Germany	East Germany	Japan	Soviet Union	Bulgaria	12
3	1977	Japan	Soviet Union	Japan	Cuba	Poland	12
4	1981	Japan	Soviet Union	Cuba	Brazil	Poland	8
5	1985	Japan	United States	Soviet Union	Czechoslovakia	Brazil	8
6	1989	Japan	Cuba	Italy	Soviet Union	United States	8
7	1991	Japan	Soviet Union	Cuba	United States	Japan	12
8	1995	Japan	Italy	Netherlands	Brazil	United States	12
9	1999	Japan	Russia	Cuba	Italy	United States	12
10	2003	Japan	Brazil	Italy	Serbia and Montenegro	United States	12
11	2007	Japan	Brazil	Russia	Bulgaria	United States	12
12	2011	Japan	Russia	Poland	Brazil	Italy	12
13	2015	Japan	United States	Italy	Poland	Russia	12
14	2019	Japan	Brazil	Poland	United States	Japan	12

== Medals summary ==
Countries in italics no longer exist.

Rank	Nation	Gold	Silver	Bronze	Total
1	Soviet Union	4	1	2	7
2	Brazil	3	0	3	6
3	Russia	2	1	0	3
4	United States	2	0	2	4
5	Cuba	1	3	1	5
5	Italy	1	3	1	5
7	East Germany	1	0	0	1
8	Poland	0	3	1	4
9	Japan	0	2	0	2
10	Netherlands	0	1	0	1
11	Czechoslovakia	0	0	2	2
12	Bulgaria	0	0	1	1
12	Serbia and Montenegro	0	0	1	1
Totals (13 entries)		14	14	14	42

== Debut of national teams ==
Year	Debutants	Total
1965	Bulgaria, Czechoslovakia, East Germany, France, Hungary, Japan, Netherlands, Poland, Romania, Soviet Union, Yugoslavia	11
1969	Brazil, Cuba, Tunisia, West Germany	4
1977	Canada, China, Egypt, Mexico, South Korea, United States	6
1981	Italy	1
1985	Argentina	1
1989	Cameroon	1
1991	Algeria, Chile, Germany, Iran	4
1995	None	0
1999	Russia, Spain	2
2003	Serbia and Montenegro, Venezuela	2
2007	Australia, Puerto Rico	2
2011	Serbia	1
2015	None	0
2019	None	0

== Participating nations ==
Legend

- 1st – Champions
- 2nd – Runners-up
- 3rd – Third place
- 4th – Fourth place
- • – Did not enter / Did not qualify
- – Hosts

Team	(Poland); 1965 (11)	(East Germany); 1969 (12)	(Japan); 1977 (12)	(Japan); 1981 (8)	(Japan); 1985 (8)	(Japan); 1989 (8)	(Japan); 1991 (12)	(Japan); 1995 (12)	(Japan); 1999 (12)	(Japan); 2003 (12)	(Japan); 2007 (12)	(Japan); 2011 (12)	(Japan); 2015 (12)	(Japan); 2019 (12)	Total
Algeria	•	•	•	•	•	•	9th	•	•	•	•	•	•	•	1
Argentina	•	•	•	•	5th	•	•	7th	9th	•	7th	7th	5th	5th	7
Australia	•	•	•	•	•	•	•	•	•	•	8th	•	9th	11th	3
Brazil	•	6th	8th	3rd	4th	5th	6th	3rd	5th	1st	1st	3rd	•	1st	12
Bulgaria	9th	4th	6th	•	•	•	•	•	•	•	3rd	•	•	•	4
Cameroon	•	•	•	•	•	8th	•	•	•	•	•	•	•	•	1
Canada	•	•	12th	•	•	•	•	10th	8th	7th	•	•	7th	9th	6
Chile	•	•	•	•	•	•	12th	•	•	•	•	•	•	•	1
China	•	•	5th	5th	•	•	•	9th	11th	10th	•	11th	•	•	6
Cuba	•	9th	3rd	2nd	•	1st	2nd	6th	2nd	•	•	5th	•	•	8
Egypt	•	•	11th	•	8th	•	•	11th	•	12th	10th	12th	10th	10th	8
France	11th	•	•	•	•	•	•	•	•	5th	•	•	•	•	2
Germany	See East Germany and West Germany						7th	•	•	•	•	•	•	•	1
Hungary	7th	•	•	•	•	•	•	•	•	•	•	•	•	•	1
Iran	•	•	•	•	•	•	11th	•	•	•	•	9th	8th	8th	4
Italy	•	•	•	7th	•	2nd	•	1st	3rd	2nd	•	4th	2nd	7th	8
Japan	4th	2nd	2nd	6th	6th	6th	4th	5th	10th	9th	9th	10th	6th	4th	14
Mexico	•	•	9th	•	•	•	10th	•	•	•	•	•	•	•	2
Netherlands	10th	•	•	•	•	•	•	2nd	•	•	•	•	•	•	2
Poland	2nd	8th	4th	4th	•	•	•	•	•	•	•	2nd	3rd	2nd	7
Puerto Rico	•	•	•	•	•	•	•	•	•	•	6th	•	•	•	1
Romania	6th	7th	•	•	•	•	•	•	•	•	•	•	•	•	2
Russia	Part of Soviet Union							•	1st	•	2nd	1st	4th	6th	5
Serbia	Part of Yugoslavia							Part of FRY / SCG			•	8th	•	•	1
South Korea	•	•	7th	•	7th	7th	5th	8th	7th	6th	11th	•	•	•	8
Spain	•	•	•	•	•	•	•	•	6th	•	5th	•	•	•	2
Tunisia	•	11th	•	8th	•	•	8th	12th	12th	11th	12th	•	12th	12th	9
United States	•	•	10th	•	1st	4th	3rd	4th	4th	4th	4th	6th	1st	3rd	11
Venezuela	•	•	•	•	•	•	•	•	•	8th	•	•	11th	•	2
Discontinued nations
Czechoslovakia	3rd	5th	•	•	3rd	•	•	See Czech Republic and Slovakia							3
East Germany	5th	1st	•	•	•	•	See Germany								2
Serbia and Montenegro	Part of Yugoslavia							•	•	3rd	See Serbia and Montenegro				1
Soviet Union	1st	3rd	1st	1st	2nd	3rd	1st	See Russia etc.							7
West Germany	•	10th	•	•	•	•	See Germany								1
Yugoslavia	8th	•	•	•	•	•	•	See Serbia and Montenegro etc.			See Serbia etc.				1

== MVP by edition ==
- 1977 – Tomasz Wójtowicz (POL)
- 1981 – Vyacheslav Zaytsev (URS)
- 1985 – Karch Kiraly (USA)
- 1989 – Karch Kiraly (USA)
- 1991 – Dmitry Fomin (URS)
- 1995 – Andrea Giani (ITA)
- 1999 – Roman Yakovlev (RUS)
- 2003 – Takahiro Yamamoto (JPN)
- 2007 – Gilberto Godoy Filho (BRA)
- 2011 – Maxim Mikhaylov (RUS)
- 2015 – Matt Anderson (USA)
- 2019 – Alan Souza (BRA)

== See also ==
- Volleyball at the Summer Olympics
- FIVB Volleyball World Grand Champions Cup
- FIVB Volleyball World League
- FIVB Men's Volleyball Nations League
- List of indoor volleyball world medalists
