= Volleyball at the 1974 Central American and Caribbean Games =

Volleyball events were contested at the 1974 Central American and Caribbean Games in Santo Domingo, Dominican Republic.

Event	Gold	Silver	Bronze
Men's volleyball	Cuba (CUB)	Mexico (MEX)	Dominican Republic (DOM)
Women's volleyball	Cuba (CUB)	Mexico (MEX)	Dominican Republic (DOM)
