= Volleyball at the 1975 Pan American Games =

This page presents the results of the men's and women's volleyball tournament during the 1975 Pan American Games, which was held from October 13 to October 25, 1975, in Mexico City, Mexico.

== Men's indoor tournament ==
=== Final ranking ===
Place	Team
1.	Cuba
2.	Brazil
3.	Mexico
4.	United States
5.	Venezuela
6.	Canada
7.	El Salvador
8.	Bahamas

1975 Pan American Games winners

Cuba
Second title

== Women's indoor tournament ==
=== Final ranking ===
Place	Team
1.	Cuba
2.	Peru
3.	Mexico
4.	Canada
5.	Brazil
6.	United States
7.	Puerto Rico

1975 Pan American Games winners

Cuba
Second title
