= 1978 FIVB Men's Volleyball World Championship =

Sports championship

1978 FIVB World Championship
Tournament details
- Host country: Italy
- Dates: 20 September – 1 October
- Teams: 24
- Venues: 6 (in 6 host cities)
- Officially opened by: Sandro Pertini

Final positions
- Champions: Soviet Union (5th title)

The 1978 FIVB Men's World Championship was the ninth edition of the tournament, organised by the world's governing body, the FIVB. It was held from 20 September 1 to October 1978 in Italy.

== Qualification ==
Means of qualification	Date	Host	Vacancies	Qualified
Host Country	—N/a	—N/a	1	Italy
1974 FIVB Men's Volleyball World Championship	12–28 October 1974	Mexico	12	Poland
1974 FIVB Men's Volleyball World Championship	12–28 October 1974	Mexico	12	Soviet Union
1974 FIVB Men's Volleyball World Championship	12–28 October 1974	Mexico	12	Japan
1974 FIVB Men's Volleyball World Championship	12–28 October 1974	Mexico	12	East Germany
1974 FIVB Men's Volleyball World Championship	12–28 October 1974	Mexico	12	Czechoslovakia
1974 FIVB Men's Volleyball World Championship	12–28 October 1974	Mexico	12	Romania
1974 FIVB Men's Volleyball World Championship	12–28 October 1974	Mexico	12	Bulgaria
1974 FIVB Men's Volleyball World Championship	12–28 October 1974	Mexico	12	Cuba
1974 FIVB Men's Volleyball World Championship	12–28 October 1974	Mexico	12	Brazil
1974 FIVB Men's Volleyball World Championship	12–28 October 1974	Mexico	12	Mexico
1974 FIVB Men's Volleyball World Championship	12–28 October 1974	Mexico	12	Belgium
1974 FIVB Men's Volleyball World Championship	12–28 October 1974	Mexico	12	Netherlands
1977 Men's European Volleyball Championship	25 Sep – 2 Oct 1977	Finland	3	Hungary
1977 Men's European Volleyball Championship	25 Sep – 2 Oct 1977	Finland	3	~~Yugoslavia~~; Finland*
1977 Men's European Volleyball Championship	25 Sep – 2 Oct 1977	Finland	3	France
Asian Qualifier	16–21 November 1976	Hong Kong	2	South Korea
Asian Qualifier	16–21 November 1976	Hong Kong	2	China
1977 Men's NORCECA Volleyball Championship	23–30 April 1977	(Dominican Republic) Santo Domingo	2	Canada
1977 Men's NORCECA Volleyball Championship	23–30 April 1977	(Dominican Republic) Santo Domingo	2	~~Puerto Rico~~; United States*
1977 Men's South American Volleyball Championship	26 Feb – 5 Mar 1977	(Peru) Lima	2	Venezuela
1977 Men's South American Volleyball Championship	26 Feb – 5 Mar 1977	(Peru) Lima	2	Argentina
1976 Men's African Volleyball Championship	1976	(Tunisia) Tunis	2	Egypt
1976 Men's African Volleyball Championship	1976	(Tunisia) Tunis	2	Tunisia
Total			24	

* Yugoslavia and Puerto Rico withdrew and were replaced by Finland and United States.

== Venues ==
Pool A, G, H and Final round	Pool B	1978 FIVB Men's Volleyball World Championship (Italy)
Rome, Italy	Bergamo, Italy	1978 FIVB Men's Volleyball World Championship (Italy)
Pool C	Pool D, I, J and Final round	1978 FIVB Men's Volleyball World Championship (Italy)
Udine, Italy	Venice, Italy	1978 FIVB Men's Volleyball World Championship (Italy)
Pool E	Pool F	1978 FIVB Men's Volleyball World Championship (Italy)
Parma, Italy	Ancona, Italy	1978 FIVB Men's Volleyball World Championship (Italy)

== Teams ==
Group A

- Belgium
- China
- Egypt
- Italy

Group B

- Finland
- Mexico
- Poland
- Venezuela

Group C

- Brazil
- France
- Soviet Union
- Tunisia

Group D

- Argentina
- Cuba
- Hungary
- Japan

Group E

- Bulgaria
- Canada
- East Germany
- Netherlands

Group F

- Czechoslovakia
- Romania
- South Korea
- United States

== Results ==
=== First round ===
==== Pool A ====
Location: Rome

Pos	Team	Pld	W	L	Pts	SW	SL	SR	SPW	SPL	SPR	Qualification
1	Italy	3	3	0	6	9	1	9.000	141	84	1.679	1st–12th pools
2	China	3	2	1	5	7	4	1.750	145	116	1.250	1st–12th pools
3	Belgium	3	1	2	4	4	8	0.500	131	156	0.840	13th–24th pools
4	Egypt	3	0	3	3	2	9	0.222	98	159	0.616	13th–24th pools

Date	Time		Score		Set 1	Set 2	Set 3	Set 4	Set 5	Total
20 Sep	15:00	Italy	3–0	Belgium	15–6	15–5	15–11			45–22
20 Sep	17:30	China	3–0	Egypt	15–13	15–6	15–6			45–25
21 Sep		China	3–1	Belgium	15–10	15–6	11–15	15–9		56–40
21 Sep		Italy	3–0	Egypt	15–5	15–4	15–9			45–18
22 Sep	17:30	Belgium	3–2	Egypt	17–15	15–1	10–15	12–15	15–9	69–55
22 Sep	21:00	Italy	3–1	China	15–8	6–15	15–11	15–10		51–44

==== Pool B ====
Location: Bergamo

Pos	Team	Pld	W	L	Pts	SW	SL	SR	SPW	SPL	SPR	Qualification
1	Poland	3	3	0	6	9	1	9.000	148	75	1.973	1st–12th pools
2	Mexico	3	2	1	5	6	6	1.000	135	144	0.938	1st–12th pools
3	Venezuela	3	1	2	4	4	8	0.500	119	166	0.717	13th–24th pools
4	Finland	3	0	3	3	5	9	0.556	163	180	0.906	13th–24th pools

Date	Time		Score		Set 1	Set 2	Set 3	Set 4	Set 5	Total
20 Sep	17:30	Mexico	3–1	Venezuela	15–13	15–6	13–15	15–3		58–37
20 Sep	21:00	Poland	3–1	Finland	15–8	15–6	13–15	15–9		58–38
21 Sep		Poland	3–0	Venezuela	15–4	15–7	15–12			45–23
21 Sep		Mexico	3–2	Finland	9–15	15–13	15–9	9–15	15–10	63–62
22 Sep	17:30	Venezuela	3–2	Finland	15–11	7–15	7–15	15–13	15–9	59–63
22 Sep	21:00	Poland	3–0	Mexico	15–3	15–7	15–4			45–14

==== Pool C ====
Location: Udine

Pos	Team	Pld	W	L	Pts	SW	SL	SR	SPW	SPL	SPR	Qualification
1	Soviet Union	3	3	0	6	9	1	9.000	148	71	2.085	1st–12th pools
2	Brazil	3	2	1	5	7	4	1.750	151	125	1.208	1st–12th pools
3	France	3	1	2	4	4	6	0.667	106	121	0.876	13th–24th pools
4	Tunisia	3	0	3	3	0	9	0.000	47	135	0.348	13th–24th pools

Date	Time		Score		Set 1	Set 2	Set 3	Set 4	Set 5	Total
20 Sep	17:30	Brazil	3–0	Tunisia	15–10	15–2	15–8			45–20
20 Sep	21:00	Soviet Union	3–0	France	15–6	15–6	15–2			45–14
21 Sep		France	3–0	Tunisia	15–7	15–4	15–6			45–17
21 Sep		Soviet Union	3–1	Brazil	11–15	17–15	15–8	15–9		58–47
22 Sep	17:30	Soviet Union	3–0	Tunisia	15–1	15–2	15–7			45–10
22 Sep	21:00	Brazil	3–1	France	15–11	15–13	14–16	15–7		59–47

==== Pool D ====
Location: Venice

Pos	Team	Pld	W	L	Pts	SW	SL	SR	SPW	SPL	SPR	Qualification
1	Cuba	3	3	0	6	9	1	9.000	147	83	1.771	1st–12th pools
2	Japan	3	2	1	5	7	4	1.750	150	110	1.364	1st–12th pools
3	Hungary	3	1	2	4	4	6	0.667	97	124	0.782	13th–24th pools
4	Argentina	3	0	3	3	0	9	0.000	58	135	0.430	13th–24th pools

Date	Time		Score		Set 1	Set 2	Set 3	Set 4	Set 5	Total
20 Sep	17:30	Cuba	3–0	Argentina	15–1	15–10	15–8			45–19
20 Sep	21:00	Japan	3–1	Hungary	15–6	15–9	12–15	15–6		57–36
21 Sep	15:00	Cuba	3–1	Japan	11–15	16–14	15–7	15–12		57–48
21 Sep		Hungary	3–0	Argentina	15–6	15–6	15–10			45–22
22 Sep	17:30	Japan	3–0	Argentina	15–3	15–3	15–11			45–17
22 Sep	21:00	Cuba	3–0	Hungary	15–1	15–9	15–6			45–16

==== Pool E ====
Location: Parma

Pos	Team	Pld	W	L	Pts	SW	SL	SR	SPW	SPL	SPR	Qualification
1	Bulgaria	3	3	0	6	9	1	9.000	146	78	1.872	1st–12th pools
2	East Germany	3	2	1	5	6	3	2.000	108	93	1.161	1st–12th pools
3	Netherlands	3	1	2	4	3	8	0.375	111	145	0.766	13th–24th pools
4	Canada	3	0	3	3	3	9	0.333	119	168	0.708	13th–24th pools

Date	Time		Score		Set 1	Set 2	Set 3	Set 4	Set 5	Total
20 Sep	17:30	Bulgaria	3–1	Canada	11–15	15–10	15–5	15–10		56–40
20 Sep	21:00	East Germany	3–0	Netherlands	15–11	15–6	15–7			45–24
21 Sep		East Germany	3–0	Canada	15–4	15–11	15–9			45–24
21 Sep		Bulgaria	3–0	Netherlands	15–5	15–7	15–8			45–20
22 Sep	17:30	Netherlands	3–2	Canada	9–15	13–15	15–13	15–4	15–8	67–55
22 Sep	21:00	Bulgaria	3–0	East Germany	15–8	15–4	15–6			45–18

==== Pool F ====
Location: Ancona

Pos	Team	Pld	W	L	Pts	SW	SL	SR	SPW	SPL	SPR	Qualification
1	South Korea	3	3	0	6	9	3	3.000	170	126	1.349	1st–12th pools
2	Czechoslovakia	3	2	1	5	8	5	1.600	166	149	1.114	1st–12th pools
3	Romania	3	1	2	4	6	6	1.000	152	166	0.916	13th–24th pools
4	United States	3	0	3	3	0	9	0.000	93	140	0.664	13th–24th pools

Date	Time		Score		Set 1	Set 2	Set 3	Set 4	Set 5	Total
20 Sep	17:30	Romania	3–0	United States	17–15	15–8	18–16			50–39
20 Sep	21:00	South Korea	3–2	Czechoslovakia	15–7	8–15	15–12	12–15	15–5	65–54
21 Sep		Czechoslovakia	3–0	United States	15–5	15–10	15–12			45–27
21 Sep		South Korea	3–1	Romania	14–16	16–14	15–3	15–12		60–45
22 Sep	15:00	South Korea	3–0	United States	15–8	15–11	15–8			45–27
22 Sep	21:00	Czechoslovakia	3–2	Romania	15–11	15–12	14–16	8–15	15–3	67–57

=== Second round ===
The results and the points of the matches between the same teams that were already played during the first round are taken into account for the second round.

==== 1st–12th pools ====
===== Pool G =====
Location: Rome

Pos	Team	Pld	W	L	Pts	SW	SL	SR	SPW	SPL	SPR	Qualification
1	Soviet Union	5	5	0	10	15	3	5.000	254	160	1.588	Finals
2	Italy	5	4	1	9	12	7	1.714	249	224	1.112	Finals
3	China	5	2	3	7	10	10	1.000	244	244	1.000	5th–8th places
4	Brazil	5	2	3	7	10	11	0.909	277	261	1.061	5th–8th places
5	Bulgaria	5	2	3	7	7	11	0.636	195	221	0.882	9th–12th places
6	East Germany	5	0	5	5	3	15	0.200	150	259	0.579	9th–12th places

Date	Time		Score		Set 1	Set 2	Set 3	Set 4	Set 5	Total
24 Sep	11:00	Bulgaria	3–2	China	8–15	15–10	15–8	14–16	15–10	67–59
24 Sep	14:30	Soviet Union	3–0	East Germany	15–3	15–7	15–11			45–21
24 Sep	19:00	Italy	3–2	Brazil	14–16	15–12	10–15	15–10	17–15	71–68
25 Sep	09:00	Soviet Union	3–1	Bulgaria	15–7	15–6	7–15	15–8		52–36
25 Sep	11:00	China	3–1	Brazil	15–10	15–13	15–17	15–13		60–53
25 Sep	19:00	Italy	3–1	East Germany	15–8	15–7	15–17	15–5		60–37
26 Sep	09:00	Soviet Union	3–1	China	15–8	15–7	9–15	15–6		54–36
26 Sep	11:00	Brazil	3–2	East Germany	11–15	15–10	15–11	8–15	15–4	64–55
26 Sep	19:00	Italy	3–0	Bulgaria	15–9	15–6	17–15			47–30
27 Sep	11:00	China	3–0	East Germany	15–5	15–3	15–11			45–19
27 Sep	14:30	Brazil	3–0	Bulgaria	15–3	15–7	15–7			45–17
27 Sep	16:30	Soviet Union	3–0	Italy	15–11	15–6	15–3			45–20

===== Pool H =====
Location: Rome

Pos	Team	Pld	W	L	Pts	SW	SL	SR	SPW	SPL	SPR	Qualification
1	Cuba	5	5	0	10	15	5	3.000	283	213	1.329	Finals
2	South Korea	5	3	2	8	12	9	1.333	266	249	1.068	Finals
3	Poland	5	3	2	8	10	9	1.111	229	221	1.036	5th–8th places
4	Czechoslovakia	5	2	3	7	11	9	1.222	241	227	1.062	5th–8th places
5	Japan	5	2	3	7	9	10	0.900	240	222	1.081	9th–12th places
6	Mexico	5	0	5	5	0	15	0.000	98	225	0.436	9th–12th places

Date	Time		Score		Set 1	Set 2	Set 3	Set 4	Set 5	Total
24 Sep	09:00	South Korea	3–0	Mexico	15–8	15–7	15–7			45–22
24 Sep	16:30	Cuba	3–2	Czechoslovakia	15–8	7–15	15–3	13–15	15–10	65–51
24 Sep	21:00	Poland	3–2	Japan	13–15	15–12	5–15	15–10	15–9	63–61
25 Sep	14:30	Poland	3–1	Czechoslovakia	15–9	3–15	15–10	15–10		48–44
25 Sep	16:30	Japan	3–0	Mexico	15–6	15–3	15–12			45–21
25 Sep	21:00	Cuba	3–2	South Korea	17–15	12–15	15–13	12–15	15–7	71–65
26 Sep	14:30	Czechoslovakia	3–0	Japan	15–9	15–6	17–15			47–30
26 Sep	16:30	Cuba	3–0	Mexico	15–9	15–2	15–11			45–22
26 Sep	21:00	South Korea	3–1	Poland	15–7	11–15	16–14	15–10		57–46
27 Sep	09:00	Czechoslovakia	3–0	Mexico	15–4	15–13	15–2			45–19
27 Sep	19:00	Cuba	3–0	Poland	15–8	15–10	15–9			45–27
27 Sep	21:00	Japan	3–1	South Korea	15–4	15–9	11–15	15–6		56–34

==== 13th–24th pools ====
===== Pool I =====
Location: Venice

Pos	Team	Pld	W	L	Pts	SW	SL	SR	SPW	SPL	SPR	Qualification
1	France	5	5	0	10	15	2	7.500	248	128	1.938	13th–16th places
2	Netherlands	5	4	1	9	14	5	2.800	266	201	1.323	13th–16th places
3	Canada	5	3	2	8	11	8	1.375	236	232	1.017	17th–20th places
4	Belgium	5	2	3	7	6	11	0.545	173	217	0.797	17th–20th places
5	Egypt	5	1	4	6	7	12	0.583	219	266	0.823	21st–24th places
6	Tunisia	5	0	5	5	0	15	0.000	129	227	0.568	21st–24th places

Date	Time		Score		Set 1	Set 2	Set 3	Set 4	Set 5	Total
24 Sep	09:00	Belgium	3–0	Tunisia	16–14	15–3	15–10			46–27
24 Sep	11:00	Netherlands	3–0	Egypt	15–11	17–15	16–14			48–40
24 Sep	14:30	France	3–0	Canada	15–9	15–6	5–6			45–21
25 Sep	09:00	Netherlands	3–0	Tunisia	15–2	15–10	15–12			45–24
25 Sep	11:00	Canada	3–2	Egypt	12–15	15–11	15–11	12–15	15–13	69–65
25 Sep	14:30	France	3–0	Belgium	15–5	15–8	15–2			45–15
26 Sep	09:00	France	3–0	Egypt	15–5	15–5	15–4			45–14
26 Sep	11:00	Canada	3–0	Tunisia	16–14	15–4	15–8			46–26
26 Sep	14:30	Netherlands	3–0	Belgium	15–2	15–4	15–8			45–14
27 Sep	09:00	Egypt	3–0	Tunisia	15–13	15–12	15–10			45–35
27 Sep	11:00	France	3–2	Netherlands	15–9	13–15	10–15	15–11	15–11	68–61
27 Sep	14:30	Canada	3–0	Belgium	15–6	15–10	11–13			45–29

===== Pool J =====
Location: Venice

Pos	Team	Pld	W	L	Pts	SW	SL	SR	SPW	SPL	SPR	Qualification
1	Hungary	5	4	1	9	13	5	2.600	243	183	1.328	13th–16th places
2	Romania	5	4	1	9	13	7	1.857	272	218	1.248	13th–16th places
3	United States	5	3	2	8	11	7	1.571	251	205	1.224	17th–20th places
4	Finland	5	2	3	7	9	12	0.750	241	264	0.913	17th–20th places
5	Venezuela	5	2	3	7	8	12	0.667	208	264	0.788	21st–24th places
6	Argentina	5	0	5	5	4	15	0.267	176	257	0.685	21st–24th places

Date	Time		Score		Set 1	Set 2	Set 3	Set 4	Set 5	Total
24 Sep	16:30	Hungary	3–0	Venezuela	15–10	15–6	15–2			45–18
24 Sep	19:00	Finland	3–2	United States	13–15	9–15	18–16	15–12	15–7	70–65
24 Sep	21:00	Romania	3–2	Argentina	15–7	11–15	15–8	11–15	15–8	67–53
25 Sep	16:30	Hungary	3–1	Finland	12–15	15–10	15–10	15–6		57–41
25 Sep	19:00	United States	3–0	Argentina	15–8	15–3	15–6			45–17
25 Sep	21:00	Romania	3–2	Venezuela	15–12	13–15	15–7	7–15	15–5	65–54
26 Sep	16:30	United States	3–1	Hungary	15–9	16–14	11–15	15–6		57–44
26 Sep	19:00	Romania	3–0	Finland	15–10	15–7	15–3			45–20
26 Sep	21:00	Venezuela	3–1	Argentina	15–6	15–12	8–15	15–13		53–46
27 Sep	16:30	United States	3–0	Venezuela	15–11	15–1	15–12			45–24
27 Sep	19:00	Hungary	3–1	Romania	15–8	7–15	15–10	15–12		52–45
27 Sep	21:00	Finland	3–1	Argentina	2–15	15–8	15–13	15–2		47–38

=== Final round ===
==== 21st–24th places ====
21st–24th semifinals
30 September
Venezuela	3
Tunisia	0
30 September
Argentina	3
Egypt	1

21st place
1 October
Venezuela	3
Argentina	0
23rd place
1 October
Tunisia	0
Egypt	3

===== 21st–24th semifinals =====
Date		Score		Set 1	Set 2	Set 3	Set 4	Set 5	Total
30 Sep	Venezuela	3–0	Tunisia	15–12	15–8	15–8			45–28
30 Sep	Argentina	3–1	Egypt	15–8	10–15	15–8	15–10		55–41

===== 23rd place match =====
Date		Score		Set 1	Set 2	Set 3	Set 4	Set 5	Total
1 Oct	Tunisia	0–3	Egypt	4–15	5–15	10–15			19–45

===== 21st place match =====
Date		Score		Set 1	Set 2	Set 3	Set 4	Set 5	Total
1 Oct	Venezuela	3–0	Argentina	15–7	15–10	15–7			45–24

==== 17th–20th places ====
17th–20th semifinals
30 September
Belgium	3
United States	1
30 September
Finland	3
Canada	0

17th place
1 October
Belgium	0
Finland	3
19th place
1 October
United States	3
Canada	0

===== 17th–20th semifinals =====
Date		Score		Set 1	Set 2	Set 3	Set 4	Set 5	Total
30 Sep	Belgium	3–1	United States	15–12	15–10	12–15	15–10		57–47
30 Sep	Finland	3–0	Canada	15–10	15–4	15–10			45–24

===== 19th place match =====
Date		Score		Set 1	Set 2	Set 3	Set 4	Set 5	Total
1 Oct	United States	3–0	Canada	15–4	15–9	15–8			45–21

===== 17th place match =====
Date		Score		Set 1	Set 2	Set 3	Set 4	Set 5	Total
1 Oct	Belgium	0–3	Finland	13–15	8–15	13–15			34–45

==== 13th–16th places ====
13th–16th semifinals
30 September – Venice
Romania	3
France	1
30 September – Venice
Hungary	3
Netherlands	1

13th place
1 October – Venice
Romania	3
Hungary	1
15th place
1 October – Venice
France	3
Netherlands	1

===== 13th–16th semifinals =====
Date		Score		Set 1	Set 2	Set 3	Set 4	Set 5	Total
30 Sep	Romania	3–1	France	11–15	15–12	15–2	15–5		56–34
30 Sep	Hungary	3–1	Netherlands	15–9	13–15	15–7	15–5		58–36

===== 15th place match =====
Date		Score		Set 1	Set 2	Set 3	Set 4	Set 5	Total
1 Oct	France	3–1	Netherlands	15–4	15–7	11–15	15–7		56–33

===== 13th place match =====
Date		Score		Set 1	Set 2	Set 3	Set 4	Set 5	Total
1 Oct	Romania	3–1	Hungary	10–15	15–12	15–4	15–7		55–38

==== 9th–12th places ====
9th–12th semifinals
30 September
Bulgaria	3
Mexico	2
30 September
Japan	1
East Germany	3

9th place
1 October
Bulgaria	1
East Germany	3
11th place
1 October
Mexico	1
Japan	3

===== 9th–12th semifinals =====
Date	Time		Score		Set 1	Set 2	Set 3	Set 4	Set 5	Total
30 Sep	09:00	Bulgaria	3–2	Mexico	12–15	15–8	13–15	15–12	15–12	70–62
30 Sep	14:30	Japan	1–3	East Germany	8–15	15–7	11–15	7–15		41–52

===== 11th place match =====
Date		Score		Set 1	Set 2	Set 3	Set 4	Set 5	Total
1 Oct	Mexico	1–3	Japan	15–12	7–15	3–15	5–15		30–57

===== 9th place match =====
Date		Score		Set 1	Set 2	Set 3	Set 4	Set 5	Total
1 Oct	Bulgaria	1–3	East Germany	15–6	9–15	10–15	10–15		44–51

==== 5th–8th places ====
5th–8th semifinals
30 September
China	1
Czechoslovakia	3
30 September
Poland	0
Brazil	3

5th place
1 October
Czechoslovakia	3
Brazil	2
7th place
1 October
China	3
Poland	2

===== 5th–8th semifinals =====
Date	Time		Score		Set 1	Set 2	Set 3	Set 4	Set 5	Total
30 Sep	11:00	China	1–3	Czechoslovakia	16–14	7–15	5–15	12–15		40–59
30 Sep	16:00	Poland	0–3	Brazil	11–15	12–15	7–15			30–45

===== 7th place match =====
Date		Score		Set 1	Set 2	Set 3	Set 4	Set 5	Total
1 Oct	China	3–2	Poland	12–15	15–13	11–15	15–13	15–13	68–69

===== 5th place match =====
Date		Score		Set 1	Set 2	Set 3	Set 4	Set 5	Total
1 Oct	Czechoslovakia	3–2	Brazil	5–15	16–14	4–15	15–11	15–6	55–66

==== Finals ====
Semifinals
30 September – Rome
Cuba	1
Italy	3
30 September – Rome
Soviet Union	3
South Korea	0

Final
1 October – Rome
Italy	0
Soviet Union	3
3rd place
1 October – Rome
Cuba	3
South Korea	1

===== Semifinals =====
Date	Time		Score		Set 1	Set 2	Set 3	Set 4	Set 5	Total
30 Sep	19:00	Cuba	1–3	Italy	17–15	11–15	14–16	12–15		54–61
30 Sep	21:00	Soviet Union	3–0	South Korea	15–3	15–3	15–9			45–15

===== 3rd place match =====
Date		Score		Set 1	Set 2	Set 3	Set 4	Set 5	Total
1 Oct	Cuba	3–1	South Korea	17–15	15–9	13–15	15–5		60–44

===== Final =====
Date		Score		Set 1	Set 2	Set 3	Set 4	Set 5	Total
1 Oct	Italy	0–3	Soviet Union	10–15	13–15	1–15			24–45

== Final standing ==
Rank	Team
1st place, gold medalist(s)	Soviet Union
2nd place, silver medalist(s)	Italy
3rd place, bronze medalist(s)	Cuba
4	South Korea
5	Czechoslovakia
6	Brazil
7	China
8	Poland
9	East Germany
10	Bulgaria
11	Japan
12	Mexico
13	Romania
14	Hungary
15	France
16	Netherlands
17	Finland
18	Belgium
19	United States
20	Canada
21	Venezuela
22	Argentina
23	Egypt
24	Tunisia

1978 Men's World champions

Soviet Union
5th title
