= 1974 Central American and Caribbean Games =

Sports events held in the Dominican Republic

Central American and Caribbean Sports Games
- Host city: Santo Domingo
- Country: Dominican Republic
- Motto: Los Docejuegos
- Edition: 12th
- Nations: 23
- Athletes: 1,928
- Opening: 27 February 1974
- Closing: 13 March 1974
- Opened by: Joaquín Balaguer
- Athlete's Oath: Porfirio Veras
- Torch lighter: Alberto Torres
- Main venue: Estadio Olímpico Juan Pablo Duarte

The 12th Central American and Caribbean Games, officially known as the XII Central American and Caribbean Games, was a major international multi-sport event held in Santo Domingo, Dominican Republic, from February 27 to March 13, 1974. Sanctioned by Centro Caribe Sports, the games were attended by 1,928 athletes representing 23 countries, competing across 18 sports.

The event marked the second time the Dominican Republic hosted the games, following the 1930 edition. Initiated by Juan Ulises García Saleta, president of the Dominican Olympic Committee, the 1974 games catalyzed significant infrastructure development in the host city, most notably the construction of the Centro Olímpico Juan Pablo Duarte. The games were officially inaugurated by Joaquín Balaguer during a broadcast evening ceremony attended by over 30,000 spectators.

Cuba won the competition after securing victories in 14 sports. The Cuban delegation amassed a total of 191 medals, including 101 golds, more than doubling the runner-up Mexico's 82 medals. Venezuela finished in third place overall with 55 medals.

== History ==
The event was held in Santo Domingo, Dominican Republic, from 27 February to March 13, 1974. It was sanctioned by the Centro Caribe Sports. The games were joined by 1,928 athletes representing 23 countries, competing across 18 sports, with Cuba as the winner of the event.

It was initiated by Juan Ulises García Saleta, president of the Dominican Republic Olympic Committee and manager of the XII Central American and Caribbean Games. was the primary advocate for building the infrastructure needed to host the event, including the construction of the Centro Olímpico Juan Pablo Duarte.

Joaquin Balaguer inaugurated the event on 27 February 1974, the evening following permission from the president of the organizing committee, Bienvenido Martinez Brea, who was attended by more than thirty thousand spectators and broadcast live on television and radio.

== Sports ==
=== Athletics ===
==== 100m men ====
The competition was held on 6 March 1974, which was won by Cuban sprinters who took all places on the podium, starting with Silvio Leonard, who took first place (10.49 seconds), and José Triana in second (10.67). Pablo Montes is in third (10.77). It was followed by Dominican Republic's Porfirio Veras in fourth (10.78), Venezuela's Félix Mata in fifth (10.87), and Puerto Rico's Jorge Vizcarrondo in sixth (10.93). During the event, no one broke the record set by Montes in (10.2 seconds).

200m men

On March 8, 1974, the men's 200-meter competition took place. Like the 100m men, Cuban sprinters took all spots on the winners' podium. It was won by Leonard, who claimed his second gold medal with a time of 20.99 seconds, followed by Pablo Bandomo with 21.37 seconds, and Triana, who won the bronze in 21.54 seconds. Antony Davis from Jamaica took fourth place with a time of 21.58 seconds, followed closely by Calhern George of the Virgin Islands with 21.63 seconds. In last place, the Dominican athlete Enrique Javier finished the competition in sixth place, 21.75 seconds.

==== 100m women ====
On March 7, 1974, the competition for 100m women was held which was won by Cuba's Carmen Vaidez secured first place (11.55 seconds), followed by her teammate Silvia Chivas in second (11.65) and Jamaica's Lelieth Hodges in third (11.75), finishing ahead of Panama's Margarita Martínez in fourth (12.02), Cuba's Marlene Elejalde in fifth (12.03), and Barbados's Janet Stoute in sixth (12.04). During the event, Vaidez set the new record.

200m women

On March 10, 1974, the event took place, with Valdez winning her second gold in 23.76 seconds. It was a tight time difference between silver and bronze, with Asunción Acosta winning by a narrow margin in 24.21 seconds to finish second, followed by Panamanian sprinter Diva Bishop, who took the bronze medal with a time of 24.39 seconds. The remainder of the field finished with Martínez, also representing Panama, secured fourth place with a time of 24.65 seconds, finishing ahead of Colombia's Elsy Rivas, who placed fifth at 24.68 seconds. Finally, Stoute crossed the finish line in 24.72 seconds.

=== Other sports ===
- Baseball ()
- Basketball ()
- Boxing ()
- Cycling ()
- Diving ()
- Football ()
- Gymnastics ()
- Judo ()
- Sailing ()
- Shooting ()
- Softball ()
- Swimming ()
- Tennis ()
- Volleyball ()
- Water polo ()
- Weightlifting ()
- Wrestling ()

== Result ==
During the event, Cuba win the event by winning 14 sport, amassing a total of 191 medals (including 101 golds) to more than double the 82 medals won by runner-up Mexico, while Venezuela secured third place with a total of 55 medals.

* Host nation (Dominican Republic)

1974 Central American and Caribbean Games medal table
Rank	Nation	Gold	Silver	Bronze	Total
1	Cuba	101	55	35	191
2	Mexico	26	30	26	82
3	Venezuela	14	16	26	56
4	Puerto Rico	9	24	36	69
5	Colombia	9	17	18	44
6	Costa Rica	3	3	2	8
7	Jamaica	2	3	2	7
8	Netherlands Antilles	2	0	5	7
9	Panama	1	12	11	24
10	Dominican Republic*	1	5	14	20
11	Barbados	1	2	1	4
12	Virgin Islands	1	0	1	2
13	Belize	1	0	0	1
14	Trinidad and Tobago	0	2	3	5
15	El Salvador	0	2	1	3
16	Bahamas	0	1	0	1
17	Bermuda	0	0	1	1
17	Guatemala	0	0	1	1
17	Guyana	0	0	1	1
17	Haiti	0	0	1	1
17	Suriname	0	0	1	1
Totals (21 entries)		171	172	186	529

== Works cited ==
Organizing Committee of the XII Central American and Caribbean Sport Games (1978). Docejuegos (PDF).

== Further link ==
- (in Spanish) Meta
- (in Spanish) colimdo
- (in Spanish) Official Results
- Memorial book, part 1
- Memorial book, part 2
