= 1994 FIVB Women's Volleyball World Championship squads =

This article shows all participating team squads at the 1994 FIVB Women's World Championship, held from November 17 to 30 October in Brazil.

== Azerbaijan ==
Head coach: Faik Karayev

Note: only a selection of 12 players listed below participated at the Championships

No.	Name	Date of birth	Height	1994 club
1	Lilia Sergueva	19.06.72	183 cm (6 ft 0 in)	Neffyag Baku
2	Elena Arifova	20.09.72	180 cm (5 ft 11 in)	Neffyag Baku
3	Alla Gassanova	06.08.70	183 cm (6 ft 0 in)	Emlak Bank Ankara
4	Victoria Ravva	31.10.75	186 cm (6 ft 1 in)	Vakibank Ankara
5	Yelena Shabovta	28.08.69	182 cm (5 ft 11 1/2 in)	Neffyag Baku
6	Gulouchen Kerimova	16.09.79	183 cm (6 ft 0 in)	Neffyag Baku
7	Tatyana Federova	20.03.78	181 cm (5 ft 11 1/2 in)	Neffyag Baku
8	Mariia Tsarenko	12.08.76	182 cm (5 ft 11 1/2 in)	Neffyag Baku
9	Alla Teterina	24.02.62	186 cm (6 ft 1 in)	Neffyag Baku
10	Olisana Barinova	06.04.78	176 cm (5 ft 9 1/2 in)	Neffyag Baku
11	Viktoriia Stepanisheheva	17.05.80	178 cm (5 ft 10 in)	Neffyag Baku
12	Svetlana Selerneva	10.02.64	180 cm (5 ft 11 in)	Neffyag Baku
13	Marina Kuzmina	07.10.78	181 cm (5 ft 11 1/2 in)	Yashiyurt
14	Dinara Aidarova	29.07.63	175 cm (5 ft 9 in)	Neffyag Baku
16	Mariia Volchkova	12.04.78	180 cm (5 ft 11 in)	Neffyag Baku

== Brazil ==
Head coach: Bernardo Rezende

No.	Name	Date of birth	Height	1994 club
2	Ana Beatriz Moser	14.08.68	185 cm (6 ft 1 in)	Leite Moça S.Paolo
3	Janina Conceiçao	25.10.72	192 cm (6 ft 3 1/2 in)	CBV
4	Ana Margarida Alvares	22.01.65	178 cm (5 ft 10 in)	BCN Volei
5	Ana Paula Rodrigues	13.02.72	184 cm (6 ft 1/2 in)	L'Acqua di Fiori/Minas
9	Hilma Aparecida Caldeira	05.01.72	182 cm (5 ft 11 1/2 in)	L'Acqua di Fiori/Minas
10	Virna Dias	13.08.71	185 cm (6 ft 1 in)	BCN Volei
11	Marcia Cunha	26.07.69	185 cm (6 ft 1 in)	BCN Volei
12	Edna Veiga	24.12.64	182 cm (5 ft 11 1/2 in)	Nossa Caia/Recreativa
13	Ana Flavia Sanglard	20.06.70	187 cm (6 ft 1 1/2 in)	Nossa Caia/Recreativa
14	Fernanda Venturini	24.10.70	181 cm (5 ft 11 1/2 in)	Nossa Caia/Recreativa
15	Fofão	10.03.70	172 cm (5 ft 7 1/2 in)	Colgate/Sao Caetano
16	Estefania Souza	24.08.72	182 cm (5 ft 11 1/2 in)	Nossa CaiaIRecreativa

== China ==
Head coach: Li Xiaofeng Note: only a selection of 11 players listed below participated at the Championships

No.	Name	Date of birth	Height	1994 club
1	Lai Yawen	09.09.70	187 cm (6 ft 1 1/2 in)	Liaoning
3	Cui Yongmei	25.01.69	181 cm (5 ft 11 1/2 in)	Shandong
6	Wang Yi	21.05.73	189 cm (6 ft 2 1/2 in)	Shanghai
8	Pan Wenli	08.03.69	183 cm (6 ft 0 in)	Shanghai
9	Su Liqun	16.10.70	187 cm (6 ft 1 1/2 in)	Jiangsu
10	Wang Ziling	14.01.72	181 cm (5 ft 11 1/2 in)	Fujian
11	Sun Yue	15.03.73	186 cm (6 ft 1 in)	Jiangsu
12	Chen Xuya	21.03.75	184 cm (6 ft 1/2 in)	Sichuan
13	Su Huijuan	03.04.64	179 cm (5 ft 10 1/2 in)	Hebei
14	Ji Liping	29.11.68	180 cm (5 ft 11 in)	Sichuan
17	Qi Lili	19.04.71	181 cm (5 ft 11 1/2 in)	Zhejiang
18	Yin Yin	02.01.74	185 cm (6 ft 1 in)	Zhejiang

== Cuba ==
Head coach: Eugenio George

No.	Name	Date of birth	Height	1994 club
1	Tania Ortiz Calvo	30.10.65	178 cm (5 ft 10 in)	Camaguey
2	Marlenys Costa Blanco	30.07.73	177 cm (5 ft 9 1/2 in)	Pinar Del Rio
3	Mireya Luis Hernandez	25.08.67	175 cm (5 ft 9 in)	Camaguey
4	Lilia Izquierdo Aguirre	10.02.66	174 cm (5 ft 8 1/2 in)	L'Avana
5	Idalmis Gato Moya	30.08.71	178 cm (5 ft 10 in)	Camaguey
6	Raisa O'Farrill Bolanos	17.04.72	181 cm (5 ft 11 1/2 in)	Villa Clara
8	Regla Bell Mc Kenzie	06.07.71	180 cm (5 ft 11 in)	L'Avana
10	Regla Torres Herrera	12.02.75	191 cm (6 ft 3 in)	L'Avana
13	Mercedes Calderon M.	01.09.65	186 cm (6 ft 1 in)	S. de Cuba
14	Analbis Fernandez Valle	03.08.73	185 cm (6 ft 1 in)	Matanzas
15	Magaly Carvajal Rivera	18.12.68	190 cm (6 ft 3 in)	L'Avana
16	Mirka Francia	14.02.75	182 cm (5 ft 11 1/2 in)	Villa Clara

== Czech Republic ==
Head coach: Milan Kanfka

Note: only a selection of 12 players listed below participated at the Championships

No.	Name	Date of birth	Height	1994 club
1	Jana Vevrova	19.02.75	183 cm (6 ft 0 in)	Slavia Praga
2	Zdenka Zimmermanova	07.11.73	182 cm (5 ft 11 1/2 in)	Up Mora Olomouc
3	Jana Tumova	10.07.74	180 cm (5 ft 11 in)	Alea KP Bmo
4	Dita Jeřábková	22.05.74	183 cm (6 ft 0 in)	Olymp Praga
5	Eva Adamodá	06.04.69	174 cm (5 ft 8 1/2 in)	Alea Bmo
6	Eva Štěpánčíková	11.12.72	176 cm (5 ft 9 1/2 in)	Up Mora Olomouc
7	Marcela Ritschelova	09.10.72	191 cm (6 ft 3 in)	Slavia Praga
8	Miluse Hadrykova	13.06.68	180 cm (5 ft 11 in)	Olymp Praga
9	Jana Jurasova	25.02.69	184 cm (6 ft 1/2 in)	Barausse Vicenza
10	Svetlana Janackova	03.07.67	185 cm (6 ft 1 in)	Up Mora Olomouc
11	Lucie Vaclavikova	20.06.67	184 cm (6 ft 1/2 in)	Rio Casamia Palermo
12	Ester Volicerova	02.06.71	182 cm (5 ft 11 1/2 in)	Olymp Praga
13	Michaela Vecerkova	21.04.73	192 cm (6 ft 3 1/2 in)	BTV Lucerna
14	Zdeňka Mocová	17.10.74	184 cm (6 ft 1/2 in)	Olymp Praga
15	Blanka Stankova	19.02.73	182 cm (5 ft 11 1/2 in)	Alea KP Bmo
16	Jaroslava Bajerova	20.04.71	182 cm (5 ft 11 1/2 in)	Olymp Praga
17	Svetlana Cenkove	06.03.66	181 cm (5 ft 11 1/2 in)	Slavia Praga
18	Jana Pechova	05.05.73	185 cm (6 ft 1 in)	SV Tubbingen

== Germany ==
Head coach: Siegfried Kohler

Note: only a selection of 12 players listed below participated at the Championships

No.	Name	Date of birth	Height	1994 club
1	Susanne Lahme	10.09.68	182 cm (5 ft 11 1/2 in)	Ecoclear Sumirago
2	Beatrice Domeland	04.08.73	180 cm (5 ft 11 in)	CJD Berlino
3	Ulrike Schwerdtner	28.09.73	178 cm (5 ft 10 in)	USC Munster
4	Costance Radfan	24.10.69	184 cm (6 ft 1/2 in)	CJD Berlino
5	Sylvia Roll	29.05.73	180 cm (5 ft 11 in)	Schweriner SC
6	Jacqueline Riedel	06.12.69	191 cm (6 ft 3 in)	TV Creglingen
7	Paggy Kuttner	16.07.75	174 cm (5 ft 8 1/2 in)	CJD Berlino
8	Ute Steppin	31.05.65	190 cm (6 ft 3 in)	Schweriner SC
9	Karin Horninger	18.06.71	187 cm (6 ft 1 1/2 in)	SpVg Feuerbach
10	Ines Pianka	15.03.69	180 cm (5 ft 11 in)	VC Schwerte
11	Christina Schultz	10.11.69	190 cm (6 ft 3 in)	Schweriner SC
12	Claudia Wilke	28.05.72	185 cm (6 ft 1 in)	n/ Creglingen
13	Jana Vollmer	05.05.73	185 cm (6 ft 1 in)	TSG Tubingen
14	Johanna Reinink	22.06.74	190 cm (6 ft 3 in)	VC Schwerte
15	Nancy Celis	09.10.66	187 cm (6 ft 1 1/2 in)	Latte Rugiada Matera
16	Anne-Kathrin Schade	26.06.68	186 cm (6 ft 1 in)	USC Munster
17	Grit Naumann	13.07.66	185 cm (6 ft 1 in)	CJD Berlino
18	Janine Grafe	01.01.74	182 cm (5 ft 11 1/2 in)	CJD Berlino

== Japan ==
Head coach: Tadayoshi Yokota

No.	Name	Date of birth	Height	1994 club
1	Motoko Obayashi	15.06.67	182 cm (5 ft 11 1/2 in)	Hitachi
2	Aki Nagatomi	17.07.69	173 cm (5 ft 8 in)	Hitachi
3	Chie Natori	09.08.69	176 cm (5 ft 9 1/2 in)	Daiei
4	Mika Yamauchi	07.10.69	182 cm (5 ft 11 1/2 in)	Daiei
6	Tomoko Yoshihara	04.02.70	179 cm (5 ft 10 1/2 in)	Hitachi
7	Kiyoko Fukuda	04.08.70	178 cm (5 ft 10 in)	Hitachi
8	Miho Murata	03.09.70	178 cm (5 ft 10 in)	Hitachi
9	Asako Tajimi	26.02.72	179 cm (5 ft 10 1/2 in)	Hitachi
12	Yumi Natta	12.07.69	161 cm (5 ft 3 1/2 in)	Daiei
13	Naomi Eto	12.07.72	186 cm (6 ft 1 in)	Hitachi
16	Maki Fujiyoshi	24.05.74	178 cm (5 ft 10 in)	Hitachi
17	Miyuki Shimasaki	13.10.74	178 cm (5 ft 10 in)	Hitachi

== Italy ==
Head coach: Aurelio Motta

Note: only a selection of 12 players listed below participated at the Championships

No.	Name	Date of birth	Height	1994 club
1	Michela Monari	29.03.73	188 cm (6 ft 2 in)	Anthesis Modena
2	Barbara De Luca	19.07.75	179 cm (5 ft 10 1/2 in)	Anthesis Modena
3	Daniela Volpi	11.06.74	175 cm (5 ft 9 in)	Carrarese
4	Vania Beccaria	24.07.73	194 cm (6 ft 4 1/2 in)	Latte Rugiada Matera
5	Manuela Leggeri	10.03.63	186 cm (6 ft 1 in)	Aster Roma
6	Cinzia Perona	16.05.73	183 cm (6 ft 0 in)	Latte Rugiada Matera
7	Alessandra Zambelli	14.02.67	179 cm (5 ft 10 1/2 in)	Teodora Ravenna
8	Barbara Siciliano	19.09.72	172 cm (5 ft 7 1/2 in)	Anthesis Modena
9	Sabina Turrini	15.09.71	188 cm (6 ft 2 in)	Teodora Ravenna
10	Silvia Croatto	06.05.73	183 cm (6 ft 0 in)	Teodora Ravenna
11	Darina Mifkova	24.05.74	188 cm (6 ft 2 in)	Anthesis Modena
12	Guendalina Buffon	14.05.73	184 cm (6 ft 1/2 in)	Impresem Agrigento
13	Anna Maria Marasi	14.08.69	180 cm (5 ft 11 in)	Latte Rugiada Matera
14	Chiara Navarrini	02.03.76	181 cm (5 ft 11 1/2 in)	Teodora Ravenna
15	Stefania Paccagnella	03.08.73	182 cm (5 ft 11 1/2 in)	Foppapedretti Bergamo
16	Monica Manrlli	03.10.75	193 cm (6 ft 4 in)	Rio Casamia Palermo
17	Antonella Bragaglia	04.02.73	183 cm (6 ft 0 in)	Foppapedretti Bergamo
18	Daniela Biamonte	03.12.73	187 cm (6 ft 1 1/2 in)	Brummel Ancona

== Kenya ==
Head coach: Cilbert Ohanya

No.	Name	Date of birth	Height	1994 club
1	Rhoda Vwosi	06.04.65	175 cm (5 ft 9 in)	Kenya Pipeline
2	Nancy Sikobe	15.08.70	180 cm (5 ft 11 in)	Kenya Posta
3	Helen Elele	09.03.73	179 cm (5 ft 10 1/2 in)	Kenya Pipeline
5	Esther Chepkosgei	26.09.69	176 cm (5 ft 9 1/2 in)	Kenya Pipeline
6	Esther Barno	06.06.68	182 cm (5 ft 11 1/2 in)	Kenya Posta
7	Esther Ouna	10.01.68	160 cm (5 ft 3 in)	Kenya Posta
8	Doris Wefwafwa	24.12.66	175 cm (5 ft 9 in)	Kenya Pipeline
10	Mary Ayuma	23.10.66	169 cm (5 ft 6 1/2 in)	Kenya Posta
12	Jackline Makokha	15.11.74	174 cm (5 ft 8 1/2 in)	Kenya Pipeline
14	Nancy Lijodi	20.09.71	172 cm (5 ft 7 1/2 in)	Kenya Commercial Bank
16	Phyllis Anyango	18.02.71	182 cm (5 ft 11 1/2 in)	Kenya Bailmays
17	Anne Wekhomba	12.04.61	180 cm (5 ft 11 in)	Kenya Commercial Bank

== South Korea ==
Head coach: Chul-Yong Kim

Note: only a selection of 12 players listed below participated at the Championships

No.	Name	Date of birth	Height	1994 club
1	Jung Eun-Sun	06.04.73	177 cm (5 ft 9 1/2 in)	Heung Kook Insur
2	Park Mi-Kyung	06.04.75	181 cm (5 ft 11 1/2 in)	Hanll Synthetic Fiber
3	Lee Do-Hee	27.01.68	170 cm (5 ft 7 in)	Ho.Nam Oil
4	Chang Yoon-Hee	22.05.70	170 cm (5 ft 7 in)	Ho.Nam Oil
5	Lee Hyun-loo	22.04.76	174 cm (5 ft 8 1/2 in)	Ho.Nam Oil
6	Kang Mi-Sun	27.03.71	175 cm (5 ft 9 in)	Heung Kook Insur
7	Kim Young-Sook	19.01.74	176 cm (5 ft 9 1/2 in)	Hyun Dai
8	Chung Sun-Hye	17.12.75	174 cm (5 ft 8 1/2 in)	Ho.Nam Oil
9	Kim Nam-Soon	25.07.70	180 cm (5 ft 11 in)	Hanll Synthetic Fiber
10	Park Soo-Jeong	02.03.72	178 cm (5 ft 10 in)	Ho.Nam Oil
11	Hong Ji-Yeon	04.07.70	187 cm (6 ft 1 1/2 in)	Ho.Nam Oil
12	Oh Yon-Kyung	05.11.71	174 cm (5 ft 8 1/2 in)	Ho.Nam Oil
13	Lee Jin-Young	06.12.72	177 cm (5 ft 9 1/2 in)	Hyun Dai
14	Joo Swn-Lan	14.11.74	180 cm (5 ft 11 in)	Hyo Sung
15	Chang So-Yun	11.12.74	184 cm (6 ft 1/2 in)	Sun Kyung Industry
16	Lee In-Sook	06.10.71	178 cm (5 ft 10 in)	Hyun Dai
17	Kang Hye-Mi	20.02.74	172 cm (5 ft 7 1/2 in)	Sun Kyung Industry
18	Seok Jung-Ah	26.07.71	173 cm (5 ft 8 in)	Fuji Film

== Netherlands ==
Head coach: Bert Goedkoop

Note: only a selection of 12 players listed below participated at the Championships

No.	Name	Date of birth	Height	1994 club
1	Jerine Fleurke	11.08.73	188 cm (6 ft 2 in)	Volco
2	Sandra Wiegers	11.12.74	182 cm (5 ft 11 1/2 in)	Martinus Amsterdam
3	Saskia van Hintum	24.04.70	173 cm (5 ft 8 in)	Bonduelle VVC
4	Erna Brinkman	25.03.72	184 cm (6 ft 1/2 in)	Schweriner SC
5	Cintha Boersma	01.05.69	182 cm (5 ft 11 1/2 in)	Tradeco Altamura
6	Vera Koenen	02.01.67	180 cm (5 ft 11 in)	Martinus Amsterdam
7	Irena Machovcak	13.11.68	186 cm (6 ft 1 in)	Bonduelle VVC
8	Aakle Hament	06.02.71	181 cm (5 ft 11 1/2 in)	Schweriner SC
9	Marjolein de Jong	16.05.68	185 cm (6 ft 1 in)	VC Riom
11	Marrit Leenstra	18.10.73	178 cm (5 ft 10 in)	Martinus Amsterdam
12	Kirsten Cleis	22.05.69	185 cm (6 ft 1 in)	Martinus Amsterdam
13	Jettie Fokkens	26.09.75	178 cm (5 ft 10 in)	Avero O.Sneek
14	Jolanda Elshof	05.08.75	184 cm (6 ft 1/2 in)	Avero O.Sneek
15	Silvia Raaymakers	28.11.74	181 cm (5 ft 11 1/2 in)	Bonduelle VVC
16	Ingrid Visser	04.06.77	188 cm (6 ft 2 in)	Bonduelle VVC
17	Riette Fledderius	18.10.77	188 cm (6 ft 2 in)	Waddenblood
18	Elles Leferink	14.11.76	176 cm (5 ft 9 1/2 in)	Arkel/Pollux

== Peru ==
Head coach: Jong Park Dug

No.	Name	Date of birth	Height	1994 club
1	Sara Joya Lobaton	11.01.76	180 cm (5 ft 11 in)	Juventus-Sipesa
2	Iris Falcon Lurita	01.11.73	171 cm (5 ft 7 1/2 in)	Power Divino Maest
3	Rosa Garcia Rivas	21.05.64	175 cm (5 ft 9 in)	Bancoper-Cristal
4	Miriam Gallardo T.	02.05.68	180 cm (5 ft 11 in)	Bancoper-Cristal
7	Milagros Cámere	22.09.72	176 cm (5 ft 9 1/2 in)	Latino Amisa
8	Milagros Moy Alvarado	17.10.75	173 cm (5 ft 8 in)	Bancoper-Cristal
9	Sandra Rodriguez V.	12.04.74	180 cm (5 ft 11 in)	Latino Amisa
11	Janet Vasconzuelos	04.07.69	170 cm (5 ft 7 in)	Bancoper-Cristal
12	Natalia Malaga Dibos	26.01.64	172 cm (5 ft 7 1/2 in)	Alianza Lima
15	Veronica Contreras	08.06.77	173 cm (5 ft 8 in)	Bancoper-Cristal
16	Luren Baylon	14.08.77	179 cm (5 ft 10 1/2 in)	Latino Amisa

== Romania ==
Head coach: Stan Gostinel

No.	Name	Date of birth	Height	1994 club
2	Cornelia Colda	03.08.68	174 cm (5 ft 8 1/2 in)	Dacia Pitesti
3	Otilia Pasarica	01.03.68	181 cm (5 ft 11 1/2 in)	Dinamo Bucarest
4	Xenia Ivanov	28.01.70	183 cm (6 ft 0 in)	Rapid Bucarest
5	Alida Cioroianu	20.03.73	190 cm (6 ft 3 in)	Universitatea Craiova
6	Mirela Bojescu	24.06.65	186 cm (6 ft 1 in)	Etiflex Ommen
7	Mihaela Formagiu	09.11.74	180 cm (5 ft 11 in)	Penicilina lasi
8	Claudea Murariu	17.11.70	181 cm (5 ft 11 1/2 in)	Petrodava Piatra Neamt
9	Lenuta Trica	11.04.67	180 cm (5 ft 11 in)	Braiconf Braila
10	Alina Pralea	24.05.69	183 cm (6 ft 0 in)	Universitatea Cluj
11	Cristina Pirv	29.06.72	181 cm (5 ft 11 1/2 in)	Conad Fano
15	Ioana Muresan	22.06.71	183 cm (6 ft 0 in)	Petrodava Piatra Neamt
16	Ruxandra Dumitrescu	20.04.77	186 cm (6 ft 1 in)	Dacia Pitesti

== Russia ==
Head coach: Nikolai Karpol

No.	Name	Date of birth	Height	1994 club
1	Valentina Oguienko	26.05.65	182 cm (5 ft 11 1/2 in)	Uralochka Ekaterinburg
2	Natalia Morozova	28.01.73	188 cm (6 ft 2 in)	Uralochka Ekaterinburg
3	Marina Nikoulina	03.03.63	178 cm (5 ft 10 in)	Uralochka Ekaterinburg
4	Elena Batoukhtina	12.04.71	184 cm (6 ft 1/2 in)	Uralochka Ekaterinburg
5	Natalia Shigina	23.06.75	190 cm (6 ft 3 in)	CSKA Moskva
7	Tatiana Menchova	27.01.70	186 cm (6 ft 1 in)	Uralochka Ekaterinburg
8	Evguenia Artamonova	17.07.75	190 cm (6 ft 3 in)	Uralochka Ekaterinburg
9	Elizaveta Tichtchenko	17.02.75	186 cm (6 ft 1 in)	Uralochka Ekaterinburg
11	Yulia Timonova	12.06.73	185 cm (6 ft 1 in)	Uralochka Ekaterinburg
12	Tatiana Gratcheva	23.02.73	180 cm (5 ft 11 in)	Uralochka Ekaterinburg
15	Inessa Emelianova	17.01.72	188 cm (6 ft 2 in)	Uralochka Ekaterinburg

== Ukraine ==
Head coach: Volodimir Buzayev

Note: only a selection of 12 players listed below participated at the Championships

No.	Name	Date of birth	Height	1994 club
1	Olga Kolomiyets	25.09.73	180 cm (5 ft 11 in)	Olexandria Bila
2	Vita Mateshik	12.02.69	178 cm (5 ft 10 in)	Orbita Zaporizhzhia
3	Mariya Polyakova	07.04.74	188 cm (6 ft 2 in)	Olexandria Bila
4	Anna Kalashnikova	20.11.72	186 cm (6 ft 1 in)	Orbita Zaporizhzhia
5	Ludmila Trotsko	25.02.65	190 cm (6 ft 3 in)	Orbita Zaporizhzhia
6	Tetyana Ivanyushkyna	18.09.66	196 cm (6 ft 5 in)	Iskra Luhansk
7	Svetlana Soulim	28.02.74	182 cm (5 ft 11 1/2 in)	Olexandria Bila
8	Alla Kravets	12.01.73	183 cm (6 ft 0 in)	Olexandria Bila
9	Tatiana Ilyina	01.01.65	188 cm (6 ft 2 in)	Olexandria Bila
10	Marina Dibinina	28.06.69	186 cm (6 ft 1 in)	Alcoreca
11	Irina Puchalska	18.06.70	183 cm (6 ft 0 in)	Dynamo Janestra
12	Elena Krivonosova	24.06.72	190 cm (6 ft 3 in)	Dynamo Janestra
13	Maria Manicova	07.02.74	190 cm (6 ft 3 in)	Orbita Zaporizhzhia
14	Yulia Volivatch	26.01.71	188 cm (6 ft 2 in)	Orbita Zaporizhzhia
15	Elena Voronkina	23.06.73	187 cm (6 ft 1 1/2 in)	Orbita Zaporizhzhia
16	Inka Ermalenko	24.08.63	186 cm (6 ft 1 in)	Zavodobanks Zapor
17	Irina Sukhorouk	24.01.73	185 cm (6 ft 1 in)	Orbita Zaporizhzhia
18	Svetlana Polovinka	28.05.77	183 cm (6 ft 0 in)	Orbita Zaporizhzhia

== United States ==
Head coach: Taras Liskevych

Note: only a selection of 12 players listed below participated at the Championships

No.	Name	Date of birth	Height	1994 club
1	Teee Sanders	28.03.68	180 cm (5 ft 11 in)	USC Munster
2	Yoko Zetterlund	24.03.69	183 cm (6 ft 0 in)	Waseda
3	Angela Miller	08.12.70	185 cm (6 ft 1 in)	LSU
4	Samantha Shaver	20.07.69	175 cm (5 ft 9 in)	UCLA
5	Lori Endicott	01.08.67	175 cm (5 ft 9 in)	University of Nebraska–Lincoln
6	Kristin Klein	20.03.70	183 cm (6 ft 0 in)	Stanford University
7	Beverly Oden	09.03.71	189 cm (6 ft 2 1/2 in)	Stanford University
8	Tammy Liley	06.03.65	180 cm (5 ft 11 in)	Arizona State University
9	Elaina Oden	21.03.67	185 cm (6 ft 1 in)	Fulgor Fidenza
10	Danielle Scott	01.10.72	189 cm (6 ft 2 1/2 in)	Long Beach State University
11	Paula Weishoff	01.05.62	184 cm (6 ft 1/2 in)	Daiei
12	Alicia Mills Polzin	06.09.71	190 cm (6 ft 3 in)	Long Beach State University
13	Tara Cross-Battle	16.09.68	180 cm (5 ft 11 in)	Brummel Ancona
14	Liane Sato	09.09.64	162 cm (5 ft 4 in)	SDSU
15	Elaine Youngs	14.02.70	183 cm (6 ft 0 in)	UCLA
16	Kimberly Oden	06.05.64	189 cm (6 ft 2 1/2 in)	Stanford University
17	Caren Kemner	16.04.65	185 cm (6 ft 1 in)	University of Arizona
18	Keba Phipps	30.06.69	191 cm (6 ft 3 in)	Latte Rugiada Matera
