= Schwertner =

Schwertner, Schwerdtner
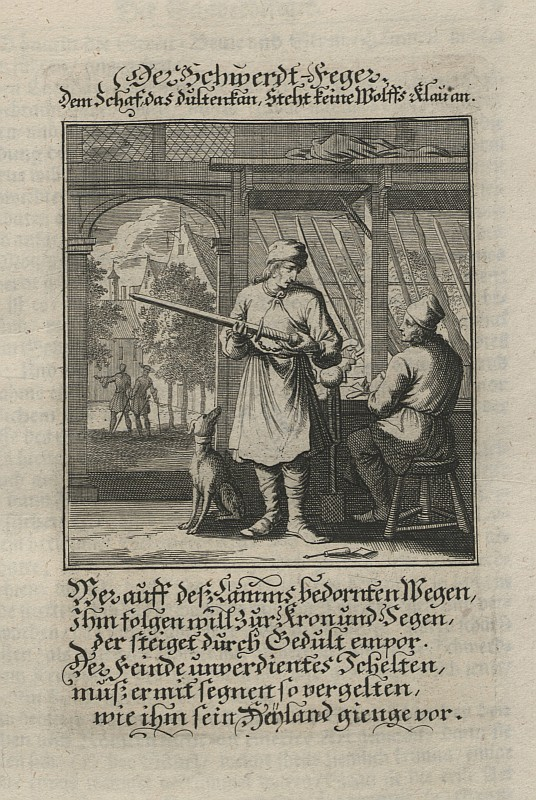

Origin
- Language: German
- Meaning: variation of "Schwerter": 1. from Schwerte, or Schwerta (place names); 2. German: Schwert "sword", meant sword maker
- Region of origin: Germany, Czech Republic

Other names
- Variant form: Schwerter

Schwertner, Schwerdtner are German surnames:

- Augustus John Schwertner (1870–1939), American prelate of the Roman Catholic Church
- Charles Schwertner (born 1970), American orthopedic surgeon and politician
- David Schwertner (Schwerdtner) (1625–1666), Bohemian-German ethnologist and Lutheran theologian
- Edwin Schwertner (1932–2016), Bohemian-German politician (DDR)
- Erich Schwertner (1918–1965), German politician (FDP, DPS)

== Schwerdtner ==
- David Schwerdtner (1625–1666), German ethnologist and Lutheran theologian
- Ines Schwerdtner (born 1989), German politician
- Peter Schwerdtner (1938–2006), German jurist
- Maren Schwerdtner (born 1985), German heptathlete
- Ulrike Schwerdtner (born 1973), German volleyball player

== See also ==
- Schwertner, Texas, an unincorporated community in Williamson County, Texas, United States

== See also ==
- Schwerner (similar spelling)
