= Estefania Souza =

Brazilian volleyball player (born 1972)

Personal information
- Nationality: Brazilian
- Born: 24 August 1972 (age 54)
- Height: 1.82 m (6 ft 0 in)

Volleyball information
- Position: Outside hitter
- Number: 16 (national team)

Career
Years	Teams
1994	Nossa Caia/Recreativa

National team
1994–1995	Brazil
Honours
Women's volleyball
Representing Brazil
World Championship
Silver medal – second place	1994 Brazil	Team
FIVB World Grand Prix
Gold medal – first place	1994 Shanghai

Estefania Souza (born 24 August 1972) is a Brazilian female former volleyball player. She was part of the Brazil women's national volleyball team that won a silver medal at the 1994 FIVB World Championship in Brazil. On club level she played with Nossa Caia/Recreativa.

== Clubs ==
- Nossa Caia/Recreativa (1994)
