= Edna Veiga =

Brazilian volleyball player (born 1964)

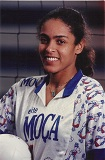
- Edna Veiga in 1996

Personal information
- Full name: Edna Maria Conrado Veiga
- Born: 24 December 1964 (age 61); Maceió, Alagoas, Brazil
- Height: 1.82 m (6 ft 0 in)
- Weight: 72 kg (159 lb)

Volleyball information
- Position: Middle blocker
- Number: 12

National team
1994–1995	Brazil
Honours
Women's volleyball
Representing Brazil
World Championship
Silver medal – second place	1994 Brazil	Team
FIVB World Cup
Silver medal – second place	1995 Japan	Team
FIVB World Grand Prix
Gold medal – first place	1994 Shanghai
Silver medal – second place	1995 Shanghai

Edna Veiga (born 24 December 1964) is a retired Brazilian female volleyball player.

Veiga was part of the Brazil women's national volleyball team at the 1994 FIVB World Championship in Brazil. On club level she played with Nossa Caia/Recreativa.

== Clubs ==
  - Sport Clube Juíz de Fora (1984–1985)
  - Transbrasil/Pinheiros (1986–1987)
  - Minas Tênis Clube (1987–1988, 1990–1991, 1997–1998)
  - Supergasbras (1988–1990)
  - Matita Rosso e Blu Napoli (1991–1992)
  - Toshiba Albamotor Cassano – Itália (1992–1993)[2]
  - Nossa Caixa /Recreativa (1993–1995)
  - Leite Moça-Leite Nestlè (1995–97)
  - Cimed/Macaé (1998–1999)
