= Ana Ida Alvares =

Brazilian volleyball player (born 1965)

Ida Álvares

Personal information
- Full name: Ana Margarida Vieira Álvares
- Nickname: Ida Álvares
- Born: 22 January 1965 (age 61); São Paulo, Brazil
- Height: 1.78 m (5 ft 10 in)
- Weight: 64 kg (141 lb)
- Spike: 300 cm (118 in)
- Block: 282 cm (111 in)

Volleyball information
- Position: Middle blocker
- Number: 4

National team
| 1984–1997 | Brazil |
Honours
Women's volleyball
Representing Brazil
Olympic Games
| Bronze medal – third place | 1996 Atlanta | Team |
World Championship
| Silver medal – second place | 1994 São Paulo | Team |
World Cup
| Silver medal – second place | 1995 Japan | Team |
World Grand Champions Cup
| Bronze medal – third place | 1997 Japan |
World Grand Prix
| Gold medal – first place | 1994 Shanghai |
| Silver medal – second place | 1995 Beijing |
Goodwill Games
| Bronze medal – third place | 1990 Seattle |
Pan American Games
| Silver medal – second place | 1991 Havana | Team |
CSV South American Championship
| Gold medal – first place | 1991 Osasco |
| Gold medal – first place | 1995 Porto Alegre |
| Silver medal – second place | 1989 Curitiba |
| Silver medal – second place | 1993 Cusco |

Ana Margarida "Ida" Vieira Álvares (born 22 January 1965) is a Brazilian retired volleyball player. She competed in three Summer Olympics for the Brazil women's national volleyball team, winning the bronze medal in her last, the 1996 Summer Olympics in Atlanta.

== Clubs ==
| Club | Country | From | To |
|---|---|---|---|
| Paulistano | Brazil | 1981 | 1983 |
| CR Flamengo | Brazil | 1983 | 1984 |
| Lufkin/Sorocaba | Brazil | 1984 | 1985 |
| Transbrasil/Pinheiros | Brazil | 1985 | 1987 |
| Sadia EC | Brazil | 1988 | 1991 |
| Botafogo | Brazil | 1991 | 1992 |
| Translittoral/Guarujá | Brazil | 1992 | 1993 |
| BCN/Guarujá | Brazil | 1993 | 1994 |
| Leite Moça | Brazil | 1993 | 1994 |
| It-Yokado Priaulx | Japan | 1994 | 1995 |
| BCN/Guarujá | Brazil | 1995 | 1996 |
| Mappin/Pinheiros | Brazil | 1997 | 1998 |
| Magna Carta Rome | Italy | 1997 | 1998 |
| Uniban/Sao Bernardo | Brazil | 1998 | 1999 |
| CR Vasco da Gama | Brazil | 2000 | 2001 |
