= Shimazaki =

Shimazaki (written: 島崎, 島﨑 or 嶋崎) is a Japanese surname. Notable people with the surname include:

- Aki Shimazaki (born 1954), Canadian writer and translator
- Haruka Shimazaki (島崎 遥香, born 1994), Japanese idol and singer
- Kyoko Shimazaki (島崎 京子, born 1972), Japanese speed skater
- Miyuki Shimazaki (島崎 みゆき, born 1974), Japanese volleyball player
- Nobunaga Shimazaki (島﨑 信長, born 1988), Japanese voice actor
- Ryo Shimazaki (島崎 竜, born 1997), Japanese footballer
- Shigekazu Shimazaki (嶋崎 重和, 1908–1945), Imperial Japanese Navy admiral
- Tōson Shimazaki (島崎 藤村, 1872–1943), pen-name of Shimazaki Haruki, Japanese writer
- Shimazaki Masaki (島崎 正樹, 1834–1886), Japanese nativist
