= Ester Volicerová =

Czech volleyball player (born 1971)

Personal information
- Nationality: Czech
- Born: 2 June 1973 (age 53)
- Height: 1.82 m (6 ft 0 in)

Volleyball information
- Position: Outside hitter
- Number: 12 (national team)

Career
Years	Teams
1990–1994; 1994–1995; 1997–2002; 2002–2005	(Czech Republic) Olymp Praga (Italy) Oranfrizer Sestese (Germany) Dresdner SC (Germany) USC Münster

National team
1993–2001	Czech Republic
Medal record
Women's volleyball
Representing Czech Republic
European Championships
Silver medal – second place	1993 Czech Republic	Team
Bronze medal – third place	1997 Czech Republic	Team

Ester Volicerová (born 2 June 1973) is a retired Czech female volleyball player. She was a member of the Czech Republic women's national volleyball team and won a silver medal at the 1993 European Volleyball Championship and a bronze medal at the 1997 edition of the tournament. She also represented her country at the FIVB Women's World Championships in 1994.

At club level, she played for Olymp Praga, Oranfrizer Sestese, Dresdner SC and USC Münster before ending her professional career in 2005 due to recurring knee injuries. She won a total of three Bundesliga, four German Cup, one German Supercup and one Czechoslovak League titles with her teams.

== Clubs ==
- (Czech Republic) Olymp Praga (1990–1994)
- (Italy) Oranfrizer Sestese (1994–1995)
- (Germany) Dresdner SC (1997–2002)
- (Germany) USC Münster (2002–2005)
