= Navarrini =

Navarrini is an Italian surname. Notable people with the surname include:

- Chiara Navarrini (born 1976), Italian volleyball player
- Renato Navarrini (1892–1972), Italian actor
- Urano Navarrini (1945–2020), Italian footballer and manager
