= Murariu =

Murariu is a Romanian surname. Notable people with the surname include:

- Claudea Murariu (born 1970), Romanian volleyball player
- Elena Murariu (born 1963), Romanian painter and iconographer
- Florică Murariu (1955–1989), Romanian rugby union player
