= Mercedes Calderón =

Cuban volleyball player

Personal information
- Full name: Mercedes Calderón Martínez
- Born: 1 September 1965 (age 61); Santiago de Cuba, Cuba
- Height: 1.86 m (6 ft 1 in)

Volleyball information
- Position: Middle blocker
- Number: 13

National team
1989–1995	Cuba
Honours
Women's volleyball
Representing Cuba
Olympic Games
Gold medal – first place	1992 Barcelona	Team
World Championship
Gold medal – first place	1994 Brazil	Team
FIVB World Cup
Gold medal – first place	1989 Japan
Gold medal – first place	1991 Japan
FIVB World Grand Prix
Gold medal – first place	1993 Hong Kong
Silver medal – second place	1994 Shanghai
Bronze medal – third place	1995 Shanghai
Pan American Games
Gold medal – first place	1991 Havana	Team
Gold medal – first place	1995 Mar del Plata	Team
Central American and Caribbean Games
Gold medal – first place	1990 Mexico City	Team
Gold medal – first place	1993 Ponce	Team

Mercedes Calderón Martínez (born 1 September 1965), more commonly known as Mercedes Calderón, is a former volleyball player from Cuba who was a member of the women's national team that won the gold medal at the 1992 Summer Olympics in Barcelona.

Calderón also won gold medals with the Cuban team at the 1991 and 1995 Pan American Games, as well as the 1994 FIVB World Championship.
