= Lee Hyun-joo =

Lee Hyun-joo may refer to:

- Lee Hyeon-ju (born 1953), South Korean figure skater
- Lee Hyun-joo (volleyball) (born 1976), South Korean volleyball player
- Lee Hyun-joo (actress) (born 1998), South Korean actress, singer and model
- Lee Hyun-ju (footballer) (born 2003), South Korean footballer
