= Bojescu =

Bojescu is a Romanian surname. Notable people with the surname include:

- Aurica Bojescu (born 1961), Ukrainian Romanian lawyer, minority rights activist and politician
- Mirela Bojescu (born 1965), Romanian female volleyball player
