= Michela Monari =

Italian volleyball player (1973–2026)

Personal information
- Nationality: Italian
- Born: 29 March 1973
- Died: 31 July 2026 (aged 53); Cremona, Italy
- Hometown: Bologna, Italy
- Height: 1.85 m (6 ft 1 in)

Career
Years	Teams
1994–1997	Anthesis Modena

National team
1994–1997	Italy

Michela Monari (29 March 1973 – 31 July 2026) was an Italian volleyball player. She was part of Italy national team.

Monari participated in the 1994 FIVB Volleyball Women's World Championship. She played at the 1997 Women's European Volleyball Championship. At club level she played with Anthesis Modena.

Monari died on 31 July 2026, at the age of 53.

== Clubs ==
Monari played three years for Anthesis Modena and played on multiple other clubs from 1985–2001.
