= Yulia Volivatch =

Ukrainian and Israeli volleyball player (born 1971)

Personal information
- Nationality: Ukrainian
- Born: 26 January 1971 (age 55)
- Height: 188 cm (6 ft 2 in)

Volleyball information

Career
- Years: Team
- 1994: Orbita Zaporizhya

National team
- Years: Team
- 1994: Ukraine
Honours
Women's volleyball
Representing the Ukraine
European Championship
Bronze medal – third place	1993 Brno-Zlin	Team

Yulia Volivatch (born 26 January 1971) is a Ukrainian and Israeli female volleyball player. She was part of the Ukraine women's national volleyball team.

She participated in the 1994 FIVB Volleyball Women's World Championship. On club level she played with Orbita Zaporizhya. She participated in the 2011 Women's European Volleyball Championship.

== Clubs ==
- Orbita Zaporizhya (1994)
