= Anna Maria Marasi =

Italian volleyball player (born 1969)

Personal information
- Nationality: Italian
- Born: 14 August 1969 (age 57)
- Height: 180 m (590 ft 7 in)

Volleyball information
- Number: 13 (national team)

Career
Years	Teams
1994	Latte Rugiada Matera

National team
1994	Italy

Anna Maria Marasi (born 14 August 1969) was an Italian volleyball player. She was part of the Italy women's national volleyball team

She participated in the 1994 FIVB Volleyball Women's World Championship. At club level she played with Latte Rugiada Matera.

== Clubs ==
- Latte Rugiada Matera (1994)
