= Barbara Siciliano =

Italian volleyball player (1972–2025)

Personal information
- Born: 19 September 1972; Sanremo, Italy
- Died: 12 June 2025 (aged 52); Lavagna, Italy
- Height: 1.72 m (5 ft 8 in)

Career
Years	Teams
1994	Anthesis Modena

National team
1994	Italy

Barbara Siciliano (19 September 1972 – 12 June 2025) was an Italian volleyball player. She was part of the Italy national team.

== Biography ==
Born in Sanremo, Siciliano started her career at the Riviera dei Fiori club, before moving to Modena, where she stayed five seasons, winning a Women's CEV Cup. She participated in the 1994 FIVB Volleyball Women's World Championship.

After retiring in 2010, she moved to Milan, where she became coach of the youth team of Pro Patria.

Siciliano died of cardiac problems on 12 June 2025, at the age of 52. She was married and had two daughters, both of them volleyball players.

== Clubs ==
- Anthesis Modena (1994)
