= Irina Sukhorouk =

Ukrainian volleyball player (born 1973)

Personal information
- Nationality: Ukrainian
- Born: 24 January 1973 (age 53)
- Height: 185 cm (6 ft 1 in)

Career
Years	Teams
1994	Orbita Zaporizhya

National team
1994	Ukraine

Irina Sukhorouk (born 24 January 1973) is a retired Ukrainian female volleyball player. She was part of the Ukraine women's national volleyball team.

She participated in the 1994 FIVB Volleyball Women's World Championship. On club level she played with Orbita Zaporizhya.

== Clubs ==
- Orbita Zaporizhya (1994)
