= Světlana Janáčková =

Czech volleyball player (born 1967)

Personal information
- Nationality: Czech
- Born: 3 July 1967 (age 59)
- Height: 185 m (606 ft 11 in)

Volleyball information
- Number: 10 (national team)

Career
Years	Teams
1994	UP Mora Olomouc

National team
1994	Czech Republic

Světlana Janáčková (born 3 July 1967) is a retired Czech female volleyball player. She was part of the Czech Republic women's national volleyball team.

She participated in the 1994 FIVB Volleyball Women's World Championship. On club level she played with UP Mora Olomouc.

== Clubs ==
- Up Mora Olomouc (1994)
