= Maria Tsarenko =

Azerbaijani volleyball player (born 1976)

Personal information
- Nationality: Azerbaijani
- Born: 12 August 1976 (age 50)
- Height: 1.82 m (6 ft 0 in)

Volleyball information
- Number: 8 (national team)

Career
Years	Teams
1994	Neffyag Baku

National team
1994	Azerbaijan

Maria Tsarenko (born 12 August 1976) is an Azerbaijani former volleyball player. She was part of the Azerbaijan women's national volleyball team at the 1994 FIVB Volleyball Women's World Championship in Brazil. On club level she played with Neffyag Baku.

== Clubs ==
- Neffyag Baku (1994)
