= Inka Ermalenko =

Ukrainian volleyball player (born 1963)

Personal information
- Nationality: Ukrainian
- Born: 24 August 1963 (age 63)
- Height: 186 cm (6 ft 1 in)

Career
Years	Teams
1994	Zavodobanks Zapor

National team
1994	Ukraine

Inka Ermalenko (born 24 August 1963) is a retired Ukrainian female volleyball player. She was part of the Ukraine women's national volleyball team.

She participated in the 1994 FIVB Volleyball Women's World Championship. On club level she played with Zavodobanks Zapor.

== Clubs ==
- Zavodobanks Zapor (1994)
