= Svetlana Polovinka =

Ukrainian volleyball player (born 1977)

Personal information
- Nationality: Ukrainian
- Born: 28 May 1977 (age 49)
- Height: 183 cm (6 ft 0 in)

Career
Years	Teams
1994	Orbita Zaporizhya

National team
1994	Ukraine

Svetlana Polovinka (born 28 May 1977) is a retired Ukrainian female volleyball player. She was part of the Ukraine women's national volleyball team.

She participated in the 1994 FIVB Volleyball Women's World Championship. On club level she played with Orbita Zaporizhya.

== Clubs ==
- Orbita Zaporizhya (1994)
