= Jaroslava Bajerová (volleyball) =

Czech volleyball player (born 1971)

Personal information
- Nationality: Czech
- Born: 20 April 1971 (age 55)
- Height: 182 m (597 ft 1 in)

Volleyball information
- Number: 16 (national team)

Career
| Years | Teams |
|---|---|
| 1994 | Olymp Praga |

National team
| 1994 | Czech Republic |

Jaroslava Bajerová (born 20 April 1971) is a Czech retired volleyball player. She was part of the Czech Republic women's national volleyball team.

She participated in the 1994 FIVB Volleyball Women's World Championship. On club level she played with Olymp Praga.

== Clubs ==
- Olymp Praga (1994)
