= Lilia Sergueva =

Azerbaijani volleyball player (born 1972)

Liliia Sergueva

Personal information
- Nationality: Azerbaijani
- Born: 19 June 1972 (age 54)
- Height: 1.83 m (6 ft 0 in)

Volleyball information
- Number: 1 (national team)

Career
Years	Teams
1994	Neffyag Baku

National team
1994	Azerbaijan

Liliia Sergueva (born 19 June 1972) is an Azerbaijani former volleyball player. She was part of the Azerbaijan women's national volleyball team at the 1994 FIVB Volleyball Women's World Championship in Brazil. On club level she played with Neffyag Baku.

== Clubs ==
- Neffyag Baku (1994)
