= Mihaela Formagiu =

Romanian volleyball player (born 1974)

Personal information
- Nationality: Romanian
- Born: 9 November 1974 (age 51)
- Height: 180 m (590 ft 7 in)

Volleyball information
- Number: 7 (national team)

Career
Years	Teams
1994	Penicilina lasi

National team
1994	Romania

Mihaela Formagiu (born 9 November 1974) is a retired Romanian female volleyball player. She was part of the Romania women's national volleyball team.

She participated at the 1994 FIVB Volleyball Women's World Championship in Brazil. On club level she played with Penicilina lasi.

== Clubs ==
- Penicilina lasi (1994)
