= Paggy Kuttner =

German volleyball player (born 1975)

Personal information
- Nationality: German
- Born: 16 July 1975 (age 51)
- Height: 174 m (570 ft 10 in)

Volleyball information
- Number: 7 (national team)

Career
Years	Teams
1994	CJD Berlino

National team
1994	Germany

Paggy Kuttner (born 16 July 1975) is a retired German female volleyball player. She was part of the Germany women's national volleyball team.

She participated in the 1994 FIVB Volleyball Women's World Championship. On club level she played with CJD Berlino.

== Clubs ==
- CJD Berlino (1994)
