= Jana Jurášová =

Czech volleyball player (born 1969)

Personal information
- Nationality: Czech
- Born: 25 February 1969 (age 57)
- Height: 184 m (603 ft 8 in)

Volleyball information
- Number: 9 (national team)

Career
Years	Teams
1994	Barausse Vicenza

National team
1994	Czech Republic

Jana Jurášová (born 25 February 1969) is a retired Czech female volleyball player. She was part of the Czech Republic women's national volleyball team.

She participated in the 1994 FIVB Volleyball Women's World Championship. On club level she played with Barausse Vicenza.

== Clubs ==
- Barausse Vicenza (1994)
