= Lenuta Trica =

Romanian volleyball player (born 1967)

Personal information
- Nationality: Romanian
- Born: 11 April 1967 (age 59)
- Height: 1.8 m (5 ft 11 in)

Volleyball information
- Number: 9 (national team)

Career
Years	Teams
1994	Braiconf Braila

National team
1994	Romania

Lenuta Trica (born 11 April 1967) is a retired Romanian volleyball player. She was part of the Romania women's national volleyball team.

She participated at the 1994 FIVB Volleyball Women's World Championship in Brazil. On club level she played with Braiconf Braila.

== Clubs ==
- Braiconf Braila (1994)
