= Olisana Barinova =

Azerbaijani volleyball player (born 1978)

Personal information
- Nationality: Azerbaijani
- Born: 6 April 1978 (age 48)
- Height: 1.76 m (5 ft 9 in)

Volleyball information
- Number: 10 (national team)

Career
Years	Teams
1994	Neffyag Baku

National team
1994	Azerbaijan

Olisana Barinova (born 6 April 1978) is an Azerbaijani former volleyball player. She was part of the Azerbaijan women's national volleyball team at the 1994 FIVB Volleyball Women's World Championship in Brazil. On club level she played with Neffyag Baku.

== Clubs ==
- Neffyag Baku (1994)
