= Ioana Muresan =

Romanian volleyball player (born 1971)

Personal information
- Nationality: Romanian
- Born: 22 June 1971 (age 55)
- Hometown: Bucharest
- Height: 183 m (600 ft 5 in)

Volleyball information
- Number: 15 (national team)

Career
Years	Teams
1994	Petrodava Piatra Neamt

National team
1994	Romania

Ioana Muresan (born 22 June 1971) is a retired Romanian volleyball player. She was part of the Romania women's national volleyball team.

She participated at the 1994 FIVB Volleyball Women's World Championship in Brazil. On club level she played with Petrodava Piatra Neamt.

== Clubs ==
- Petrodava Piatra Neamt (1994)
