= Gulouchen Karimova =

Azerbaijani volleyball player (born 1979)

Personal information
- Nationality: Azerbaijani
- Born: 16 September 1979 (age 47)
- Height: 1.83 m (6 ft 0 in)

Volleyball information
- Number: 6 (national team)

Career
Years	Teams
1994	Neffyag Baku

National team
1994	Azerbaijan

Gulouchen Karimova (born 16 September 1979) is an Azerbaijani former volleyball player.

She was part of the Azerbaijan women's national volleyball team at the 1994 FIVB Volleyball Women's World Championship in Brazil. On club level she played with Neffyag Baku.

== Clubs ==
- Neffyag Baku (1994)
