= Alina Pralea =

Romanian volleyball player (born 1969)

Personal information
- Nationality: Romanian
- Born: 24 May 1969 (age 57)
- Height: 183 m (600 ft 5 in)

Volleyball information
- Number: 10 (national team)

Career
Years	Teams
1994	Universitatea Cluj

National team
1994	Romania

Alina Pralea (born 24 May 1969) was a Romanian female volleyball player. She was part of the Romania women's national volleyball team.

She participated at the 1994 FIVB Volleyball Women's World Championship in Brazil. On club level she played with Universitatea Cluj.

== Clubs ==
- Universitatea Cluj (1994)
