= Svetlana Cenkova =

Czech volleyball player (born 1966)

Svetlana Cenkove

Personal information
- Nationality: Czech
- Born: 6 March 1966 (age 60)
- Height: 181 m (593 ft 10 in)

Volleyball information
- Number: 17 (national team)

Career
Years	Teams
1994	Slavia Praga

National team
1994	Czech Republic

Svetlana Cenkove (born 6 March 1966) is a retired Czech female volleyball player. She was part of the Czech Republic women's national volleyball team.

She participated in the 1994 FIVB Volleyball Women's World Championship. On club level she played with Slavia Praga.

== Clubs ==
- Slavia Praga (1994)
