= Monica Marulli =

Italian volleyball player

Personal information
- Born: March 10, 1975
- Height: 1.96 m (6 ft 5 in)

Monica Marulli (born March 10, 1975) is a retired Italian volleyball player. She participated in the 1994 FIVB Volleyball Women's World Championship. On club level she played with Rio Casamia Palermo and Tena Santeramo.
