= Alla Teterina =

Azerbaijani volleyball player (born 1962)

Personal information
- Nationality: Azerbaijani
- Born: 24 February 1962 (age 64)
- Height: 1.86 m (6 ft 1 in)

Volleyball information
- Number: 9 (national team)

Career
Years	Teams
1994	Neffyag Baku

National team
1994	Azerbaijan

Alla Teterina (born 24 February 1962) was an Azerbaijani volleyball player. She was part of the Azerbaijan women's national volleyball team.

She participated at the 1994 FIVB Volleyball Women's World Championship in Brazil. On club level she played with Neffyag Baku.

== Clubs ==
- Neffyag Baku (1994)
