= Svetlana Selerneva =

Azerbaijani volleyball player (born 1964)

Personal information
- Nationality: Azerbaijani
- Born: 10 February 1964 (age 62)
- Height: 1.80 m (5 ft 11 in)

Volleyball information
- Number: 12 (national team)

Career
Years	Teams
1994	Neffyag Baku

National team
1994	Azerbaijan

Svetlana Selerneva (born 10 February 1964) is an Azerbaijani former volleyball player. She was part of the Azerbaijan women's national volleyball team at the 1994 FIVB Volleyball Women's World Championship in Brazil. On club level she played with Neffyag Baku.

== Clubs ==
- Neffyag Baku (1994)
