= Xenia Ivanov =

Romanian volleyball player (born 1970)

Personal information
- Nationality: Romanian
- Born: 28 January 1970 (age 56)
- Height: 183 m (600 ft 5 in)

Volleyball information
- Number: 4 (national team)

Career
- Years: Team
- 1994-?: Rapid Bucarest

National team
- Years: Team
- 1994: Romania

Xenia Ivanov (born 28 January 1970) is a retired Romanian female volleyball player. She was part of the Romania women's national volleyball team.

She participated at the 1994 FIVB Volleyball Women's World Championship in Brazil. On club level she played with Rapid Bucarest.

== Clubs ==
- Rapid Bucarest (1994)
