= Stefania Paccagnella =

Italian volleyball player (born 1973)

Personal information
- Nationality: Italian
- Born: 3 August 1973 (age 53)
- Height: 1.82 m (6 ft 0 in)

Volleyball information
- Number: 15 (national team)

Career
| Years | Teams |
|---|---|
| 1994 | Foppapedretti Bergamo |

National team
| 1994 | Italy |

Stefania Paccagnella (born 3 August 1973) is a retired Italian volleyball player. She was part of the Italy women's national volleyball team.

She participated in the 1994 FIVB Volleyball Women's World Championship. On club level she played with Foppapedretti Bergamo.

== Clubs ==
- Foppapedretti Bergamo (1994)
