= Daniela Volpi =

Italian volleyball player (born 1974)

Personal information
- Nationality: Italian
- Born: 11 June 1974 (age 52)
- Height: 175 m (574 ft 2 in)

Volleyball information
- Number: 3 (national team)

Career
Years	Teams
1994	Carrarese

National team
1994	Italy

Daniela Volpi (born 11 June 1974) is a retired Italian female volleyball player. She was part of the Italy women's national volleyball team.

She participated in the 1994 FIVB Volleyball Women's World Championship. On club level she played with Carrarese.

== Clubs ==
- Carrarese (1994)
