= Eva Adamová =

Czech volleyball player (born 1969)

Personal information
- Nationality: Czech
- Born: 6 April 1969 (age 57)
- Height: 174 cm (5 ft 9 in)

Volleyball information
- Number: 5 (national team)

Career
- Years: Team
- 1994: Alea Brno

National team
- Years: Team
- 1994: Czech Republic

Eva Adamová (born 6 April 1969) is a retired Czech volleyball player. She was part of the Czech Republic women's national volleyball team.

She participated in the 1994 FIVB Volleyball Women's World Championship. On club level she played with Alea Brno.

== Clubs ==
- Alea Brno (1994)
