= Cornelia Colda =

Romanian volleyball player (born 1968)

Personal information
- Nickname: Lili
- Nationality: Romanian
- Born: 3 August 1968 (age 58)
- Height: 174 m (570 ft 10 in)

Volleyball information
- Number: 2 (national team)

Career
Years	Teams
1994	Dacia Pitesti

National team
1994	Romania

Cornelia Colda (born 3 August 1968) is a retired Romanian volleyball player. She was part of the Romania women's national volleyball team.

She participated at the 1994 FIVB Volleyball Women's World Championship in Brazil. On club level she played with Dacia Pitesti.

== Clubs ==
- Dacia Pitesti (1994)
