= Anna Kalashnikova =

Ukrainian volleyball player (born 1972)

Personal information
- Nationality: Ukrainian
- Born: 20 November 1972 (age 53)
- Height: 186 cm (6 ft 1 in)

Career
Years	Teams
1994	Orbita Zaporizhya

National team
1994	Ukraine
Honours
Women's volleyball
Representing the Ukraine
European Championship
Bronze medal – third place	1993 Brno-Zlin	Team

Anna Kalashnikova (born 20 November 1972) is a retired Ukrainian female volleyball player. She was part of the Ukraine women's national volleyball team.

She participated in the 1994 FIVB Volleyball Women's World Championship. On club level she played with Orbita Zaporizhya.

== Clubs ==
- Orbita Zaporizhya (1994)
