= Samantha Shaver =

American volleyball player (born 1969)

Personal information
- Nationality: American
- Born: July 20, 1969 (age 57)
- Height: 5 ft 9 in (175 cm)

Volleyball information
- Number: 4 (national team)

Career
Years	Teams
1994	UCLA

National team
1994	United States

Samantha Shaver (born July 20, 1969) is a retired American female volleyball player. She was part of the United States women's national volleyball team.

She participated in the 1994 FIVB Volleyball Women's World Championship. On club level she played with UCLA.

== Clubs ==
- UCLA (1994)
