= Chen Xuya =

Chinese volleyball player (born 1975)

Personal information
- Nationality: Chinese
- Born: 21 March 1985 (age 41)
- Height: 184 m (603 ft 8 in)

Career
Years	Teams
1994	Sichuan

National team
1994	China

Chen Xuya (born 21 March 1975) is a retired female volleyball player. She was part of the China women's national volleyball team.

She participated in the 1994 FIVB Volleyball Women's World Championship. On club level, she played with Sichuan.

== Clubs ==
- (China) Sichuan (1994)
