= Dita Jeřábková =

Czech volleyball player (born 1974)

Personal information
- Nationality: Czech
- Born: 22 May 1974 (age 52)
- Height: 1.83 m (6 ft 0 in)

Volleyball information
- Number: 4 (national team)

Career
Years	Teams
1994; 1999–2001; 2015–	(Czech Republic) PVK Olymp Praha (Belgium) Isola Tongeren (Czech Republic) Volejbal Přerov

National team
1994	Czech Republic

Dita Jeřábková (born 22 May 1974) is a retired Czech female volleyball player. She was part of the Czech Republic women's national volleyball team.

She participated in the 1994 FIVB Volleyball Women's World Championship. On club level she played with PVK Olymp Praha.

== Clubs ==
- (Czech Republic) PVK Olymp Praha (1994)
- (Belgium) Isola Tongeren (1999-2001)
