= Joo Swn-lan =

South Korean volleyball player (born 1974)

Joo Swn-Lan

Personal information
- Nationality: South Korean
- Born: 14 November 1974 (age 51)
- Height: 1.80 m (5 ft 11 in)

Volleyball information
- Number: 14 (national team)

Career
Years	Teams
1994	Hyosung

National team
1994	South Korea

- Joo Swn-lan
- Hangul: 주순란
- Hanja: 朱順蘭
- RR: Ju Sunran
- MR: Chu Sullan

Joo Swn-Lan (born 14 November 1974) is a retired South Korean female volleyball player. She was part of the South Korea women's national volleyball team.

She participated in the 1994 FIVB Volleyball Women's World Championship. She attended Seong-am Girls' Commercial High School (성암여자상업고등학교) in Seoul, and went on to play at the club level for Hyosung.

== Clubs ==
- Hyosung (1994)
