= Jacqueline Riedel =

German volleyball player (born 1969)

Personal information
- Nationality: German
- Born: 6 December 1969 (age 56)
- Height: 191 m (626 ft 8 in)

Volleyball information
- Number: 6 (national team)

Career
Years	Teams
1994	TV Creglingen

National team
1994	Germany

Jacqueline Riedel (born 6 December 1969) is a retired German female volleyball player. She was part of the Germany women's national volleyball team.

She participated in the 1994 FIVB Volleyball Women's World Championship. On club level she played with TV Creglingen.

== Clubs ==
- TV Creglingen (1994)
