= Miluše Hadryková =

Czech volleyball player (born 1968)

Personal information
- Nationality: Czech
- Born: 13 June 1968 (age 58)
- Height: 180 m (590 ft 7 in)

Volleyball information
- Number: 8 (national team)

Career
Years	Teams
1994	Olymp Praga

National team
1994	Czech Republic

Miluše Hadryková (born 13 June 1968) is a retired Czech female volleyball player. She was part of the Czech Republic women's national volleyball team.

She participated in the 1994 FIVB Volleyball Women's World Championship. On club level, she played with Olymp Praga.

== Clubs ==
- Olymp Praga (1994)
