= Jana Tůmová =

Czech volleyball player (born 1974)

Personal information
- Nationality: Czech
- Born: 10 July 1974 (age 52)
- Height: 180 m (590 ft 7 in)

Volleyball information
- Number: 3 (national team)

Career
Years	Teams
1994	Alea KP Brno

National team
1994	Czech Republic

Jana Tůmová (born 10 July 1974) is a retired Czech female volleyball player. She was part of the Czech Republic women's national volleyball team.

She participated in the 1994 FIVB Volleyball Women's World Championship. On club level she played with Alea KP Brno.

== Clubs ==
- Alea KP Brno (1994)
