= Márcia Fu =

Brazilian volleyball player

Personal information
- Full name: Márcia Regina Cunha
- Born: 26 July 1969 (age 57); Juiz de Fora, Minas Gerais, Brazil
- Height: 1.85 m (6 ft 1 in)
- Weight: 80 kg (176 lb)
- Spike: 295 cm (116 in)
- Block: 278 cm (109 in)

Volleyball information
- Position: Opposite
- Number: 11
Honours
Women's volleyball
Representing Brazil
Summer Olympics
Bronze medal – third place	1996 Atlanta	Team
World Championship
Silver medal – second place	1994 Brazil	Team
World Cup
Silver medal – second place	1995 Japan	Team
World Grand Prix
Gold medal – first place	1994 Shanghai
Silver medal – second place	1995 Shanghai
Montreux Volley Masters
Gold medal – first place	1994 Switzerland
Gold medal – first place	1995 Switzerland
Silver medal – second place	1993 Switzerland
Silver medal – second place	1996 Switzerland
Goodwill Games
Bronze medal – third place	1990 Seattle
Pan American Games
Silver medal – second place	1991 Havana	Team
South American Championship
Gold medal – first place	1995 Porto Alegre
Silver medal – second place	1989 Curitiba
Silver medal – second place	1993 Cuzco
FIVB U20 World Championship
Gold medal – first place	1987 Seoul
Gold medal – first place	1989 Lima

Marcia Regina Cunha (born 26 July 1969), known as Marcia Fu, is a Brazilian female retired volleyball player. She participated with the Brazil women's national volleyball team at the 1988 Summer Olympics, 1992 Summer Olympics and 1996 Summer Olympics, winning the bronze medal at the 1996 Summer Olympics. She participated at the 1994 FIVB World Championship in Brazil.

== Clubs ==
Club	Country	From	To
Minas Tênis Clube	Brazil	1985	1988
Sadia E.C.	Brazil	1988	1991
L'acqua di Fiori/Minas	Brazil	1992	1993
BCN/Guarujá	Brazil	1993	1995
Tensor/E.C. Pinheiros	Brazil	1995	1996
BCN/Osasco	Brazil	1996	1998
Macaé	Brazil	1998	1999
Ankara Vakıfbank	Turkey	1999	1999
Vasco da Gama	Brazil	2000	2001
