= Viktoria Stepanisheheva =

Azerbaijani volleyball player (born 1980)

Personal information
- Nationality: Azerbaijani
- Born: 17 May 1980 (age 46)
- Height: 1.78 m (5 ft 10 in)

Volleyball information
- Number: 11 (national team)

Career
- Years: Team
- 1994: Neffyag Baku

National team
- Years: Team
- 1994: Azerbaijan

Viktoria Stepanisheheva (born 17 May 1980) is an Azerbaijani former volleyball player. She was part of the Azerbaijan women's national volleyball team at the 1994 FIVB Volleyball Women's World Championship in Brazil. On club level she played with Neffyag Baku. As of 2024, she is the head coach of Moscow's Dynamo-Akademiya U-20 Women's Team.

== Clubs ==
- Neffyag Baku (1994)
- Dynamo-Akademiya U-20 Women's Team (2024–Present)
