= Blanka Staňková =

Czech volleyball player (born 1973)

Personal information
- Nationality: Czech
- Born: 19 February 1973 (age 53)
- Height: 182 m (597 ft 1 in)

Volleyball information
- Number: 15 (national team)

Career
Years	Teams
1994	Alea KP Bmo

National team
1994	Czech Republic

Blanka Staňková (born 19 February 1973) is a retired Czech female volleyball player. She was part of the Czech Republic women's national volleyball team.

She participated in the 1994 FIVB Volleyball Women's World Championship. On club level she played with Alea KP Bmo.

== Clubs ==
- Alea KP Bmo (1994)
