= Anne-Kathrin Schade =

German volleyball player (born 1968)

Anne Kathrin Schade

Personal information
- Nationality: German
- Born: 26 June 1968 (age 58)
- Height: 186 m (610 ft 3 in)

Volleyball information
- Number: 16 (national team)

Career
Years	Teams
1994	USC Munster

National team
1994	Germany

Anne Kathrin Schade (born 26 June 1968) was a German female volleyball player. She was part of the Germany women's national volleyball team.

She participated in the 1994 FIVB Volleyball Women's World Championship. On club level she played with USC Munster.

== Clubs ==
- USC Munster (1994)
