= Johanna Reinink =

German volleyball player (born 1974)

Personal information
- Nationality: German
- Born: 22 June 1974 (age 52)
- Height: 190 cm (6 ft 3 in)
- Spike: 303 cm (119 in)
- Block: 290 cm (114 in)

Volleyball information
- Number: 7 (national team)

National team
1998	Germany

Johanna Reinink (born 22 June 1974) is a retired German female volleyball player. She was part of the Germany women's national volleyball team.

She participated at the 1994 FIVB Volleyball Women's World Championship, and at the 1998 FIVB Volleyball Women's World Championship in Japan.
