= Jana Vevrova =

Czech volleyball player (born 1975)

Personal information
- Nationality: Czech
- Born: 19 February 1975 (age 51)
- Height: 183 m (600 ft 5 in)

Volleyball information
- Number: 1 (national team)

Career
Years	Teams
1994	Slavia Praga

National team
1994	Czech Republic

Jana Vevrova (born 19 February 1975) is a retired Czech female volleyball player. She was part of the Czech Republic women's national volleyball team.

She participated in the 1994 FIVB Volleyball Women's World Championship. On club level she played with Slavia Praga.

== Clubs ==
- Slavia Praga (1994)
