= Dinara Aidarova =

Azerbaijani volleyball player (born 1963)

Personal information
- Nationality: Azerbaijani
- Born: 29 July 1963 (age 63)
- Height: 1.75 m (5 ft 9 in)

Volleyball information
- Number: 14 (national team)

Career
Years	Teams
1994	Neffyag Baku

National team
1994	Azerbaijan

Dinara Aidarova (born 29 July 1963) is an Azerbaijani former volleyball player.

She was part of the Azerbaijan women's national volleyball team at the 1994 FIVB Volleyball Women's World Championship in Brazil. On club level she played with Neffyag Baku.

== Clubs ==
- Neffyag Baku (1994)
