= Ludmila Trotsko =

Ukrainian volleyball player (born 1965)

Personal information
- Nationality: Ukrainian
- Born: 25 February 1965 (age 61)
- Height: 190 cm (6 ft 3 in)

Career
Years	Teams
1994	Orbita Zaporizhya

National team
1994	Ukraine
Honours
Women's volleyball
Representing the Ukraine
European Championship
Bronze medal – third place	1993 Brno-Zlin	Team

Ludmila Trotsko (born 25 February 1965) is a retired Ukrainian volleyball player. She was part of the Ukraine women's national volleyball team.

She participated in the 1994 FIVB Volleyball Women's World Championship. On club level she played with Orbita Zaporizhya.

== Clubs ==
- Orbita Zaporizhya (1994)
