= Marcela Ritschelová =

Czech volleyball player (born 1972)

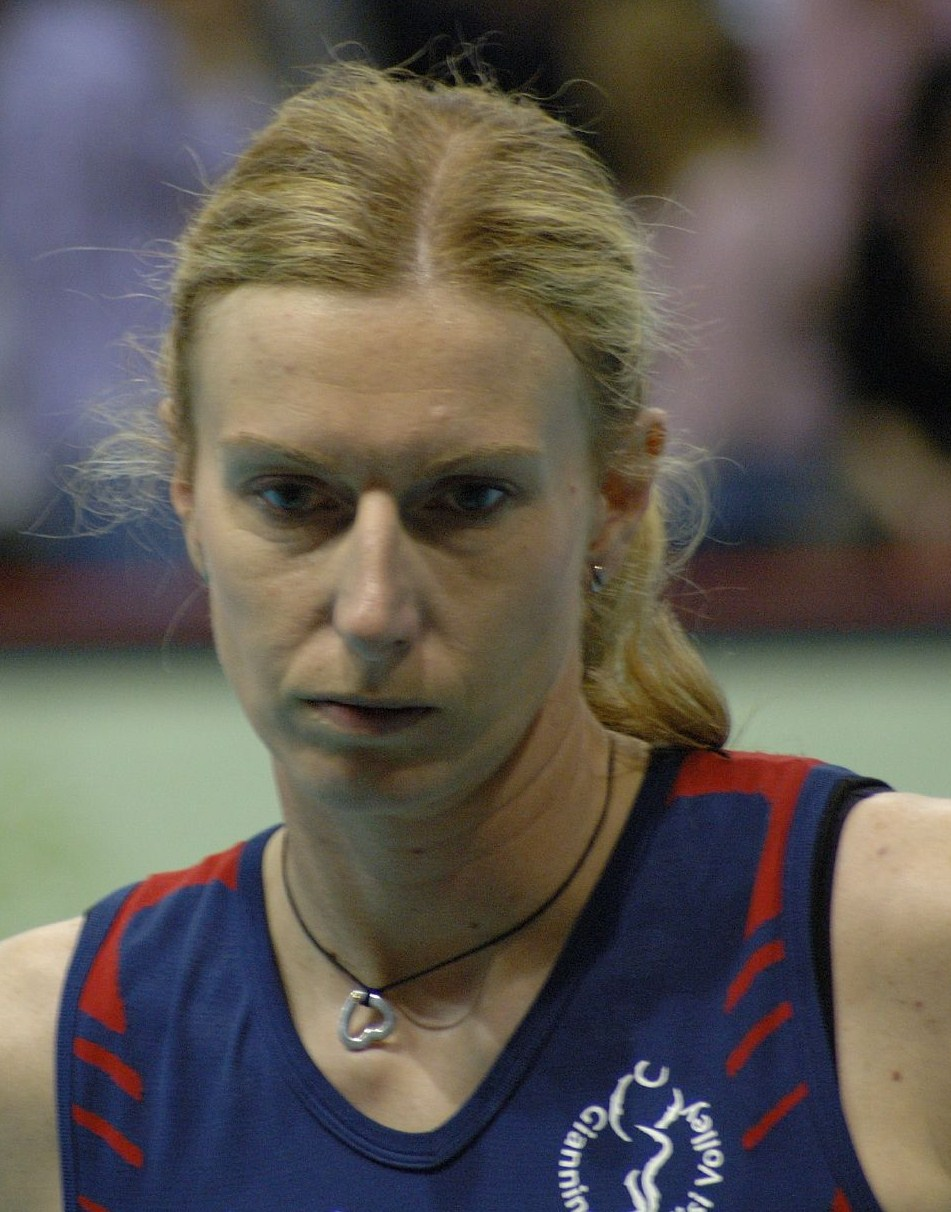
- Marcela Ritschelová, was a Czech volleyball player.

Personal information
- Nationality: Czech
- Born: 9 October 1972 (age 54); Ústí nad Labem, Czechoslovakia
- Height: 1.92 m (6 ft 4 in)

Volleyball information
- Position: middle blocker
- Current club: Pallavolo Palermo
- Number: 7 (national team)

National team
2001-2002	Czech Republic

Marcela Ritschelová (born 9 October 1972) is a retired Czech female volleyball player, who played as a middle blocker. She was part of the Czech Republic women's national volleyball team.

She participated in the 1994 FIVB Volleyball Women's World Championship, and at the 2002 FIVB Volleyball Women's World Championship in Germany. She also competed at the 2001 Women's European Volleyball Championship. On club level she played with Pallavolo Palermo.

== Clubs ==
- Pallavolo Palermo (2002)
