= Ana Flávia Sanglard =

Brazilian female volleyball player

Personal information
- Born: 20 June 1970 (age 56); Belo Horizonte, Minas Gerais, Brazil
- Height: 1.87 m (6 ft 2 in)
- Spike: 299 cm (118 in)
- Block: 290 cm (114 in)

Volleyball information
- Position: Middle blocker
- Number: 13

National team
| 1990–1998 | Brazil |
Honours
Women's volleyball
Representing Brazil
Olympic Games
| Bronze medal – third place | 1996 Atlanta | Team |
World Championship
| Silver medal – second place | 1994 Brazil | Team |
Goodwill Games
| Bronze medal – third place | 1990 Seattle |
Pan American Games
| Silver medal – second place | 1991 Havana | Team |
CSV South American Championship
| Gold medal – first place | 1991 Osasco |
| Gold medal – first place | 1995 Porto Alegre |
| Silver medal – second place | 1993 Cusco |

Ana Flávia Chritaro Daniel Sanglard (born 20 June 1970), also known as Ana Flávia, is a Brazilian female retired volleyball player and two-time Olympian.

Flávia was part of the Brazilian women's national volleyball team at the 1992 Summer Olympics in Barcelona and the 1996 Summer Olympics in Atlanta, where she won a bronze medal.

Flávia also competed at the 1994 FIVB World Championship in Brazil, where she won a silver medal, as well as the 1998 FIVB World Championship in Japan.

Awards
| Preceded by (Brazil) Fernanda Venturini | Best Setter of FIVB World Grand Prix; 1996 | Succeeded by (Brazil) Hélia de Souza |
