= Cinzia Perona =

Italian volleyball player (born 1973)

Personal information
- Nationality: Italian
- Born: 16 May 1973 (age 53)
- Height: 183 m (600 ft 5 in)

Volleyball information
- Number: 6 (national team)

Career
Years	Teams
1994	Latte Rugiada Matera

National team
1994	Italy

Cinzia Perona (born 16 May 1973) is a retired Italian volleyball player. She was part of the Italy women's national volleyball team.

She participated in the 1994 FIVB Volleyball Women's World Championship. On club level she played with Latte Rugiada Matera.

== Clubs ==
- Latte Rugiada Matera (1994)
