= Silvia Croatto =

Italian volleyball player (born 1973)

Personal information
- Nationality: Italian
- Born: 6 May 1973 (age 53)
- Height: 183 m (600 ft 5 in)

Volleyball information
- Number: 10 (national team)

Career
| Years | Teams |
|---|---|
| 1994 | Teodora Ravenna |

National team
| 1994-2001 | Italy |

Silvia Croatto (born 6 May 1973) is a retired Italian female volleyball player. She was part of the Italy women's national volleyball team winning the silver medal at the 2001 Women's European Volleyball Championship.

She participated in the 1994 FIVB Volleyball Women's World Championship. She also played at the 2003 Women's European Volleyball Championship. On club level she played with Teodora Ravenna.

== Clubs ==
- Teodora Ravenna (1994)
