= Claudia Wilke =

German volleyball player (born 1971)

Personal information
- Nationality: German
- Born: 28 May 1971 (age 55)
- Height: 184 cm (6 ft 0 in)
- Spike: 309 cm (122 in)
- Block: 286 cm (113 in)

Volleyball information
- Number: 18 (national team)

National team
1998	Germany

Claudia Wilke (born 28 May 1971) is a retired German female volleyball player. She was part of the Germany women's national volleyball team.

She participated at the 1994 FIVB Volleyball Women's World Championship, and at the 1998 FIVB Volleyball Women's World Championship in Japan.
