= Janine Grafe =

German volleyball player (born 1974)

Personal information
- Nationality: German
- Born: 1 January 1974 (age 52)
- Height: 182 m (597 ft 1 in)

Volleyball information
- Number: 18 (national team)

Career
Years	Teams
1994	CJD Berlino

National team
1994	Germany

Janine Grafe (born 1 January 1974) is a retired German female volleyball player. She was part of the Germany women's national volleyball team.

She participated in the 1994 FIVB Volleyball Women's World Championship. On club level she played with CJD Berlino.

== Clubs ==
- CJD Berlino (1994)
