= Chiara Navarrini =

Italian volleyball player (born 1976)

Personal information
- Nationality: Italian
- Born: 2 March 1976 (age 50)
- Height: 181 m (593 ft 10 in)

Volleyball information
- Number: 14 (national team)

Career
Years	Teams
1994	Teodora Ravenna

National team
1994-1997	Italy

Chiara Navarrini (born 2 March 1976) is a retired Italian volleyball player. She was part of the Italy women's national volleyball team.

She participated in the 1994 FIVB Volleyball Women's World Championship, and at the 1997 Women's European Volleyball Championship. On club level she played with Teodora Ravenna.

== Clubs ==
- Teodora Ravenna (1994)
