= Irina Puchalska =

Ukrainian volleyball player (born 1970)

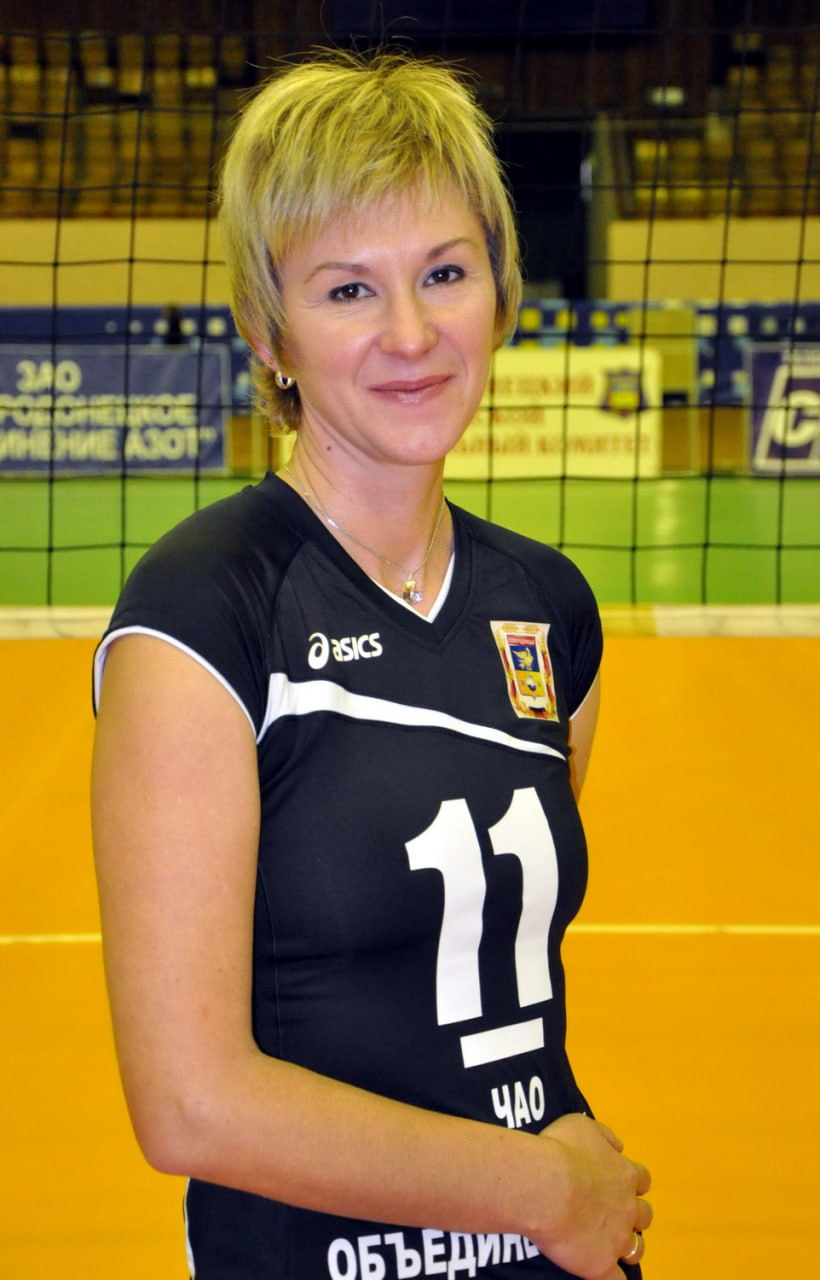

Personal information
- Nationality: Ukrainian
- Born: 18 June 1970 (age 56)
- Height: 183 cm (6 ft 0 in)

Career
Years	Teams
1994	Dynamo Janestra

National team
1994	Ukraine
Honours
Women's volleyball
Representing Ukraine
European Championship
Bronze medal – third place	1993 Brno-Zlin	Team
Representing Soviet Union
European Junior Championship
Gold medal – first place	1988 Italy	Team

Irina Puchalska (born 18 June 1970) is a retired Ukrainian female volleyball player. She was part of the Ukraine women's national volleyball team.

She participated in the 1994 FIVB Volleyball Women's World Championship. On club level she played with Dynamo Janestra.

== Clubs ==
- Dynamo Janestra (1994)
