= Marina Dubinina =

Ukrainian volleyball player (born 1969)

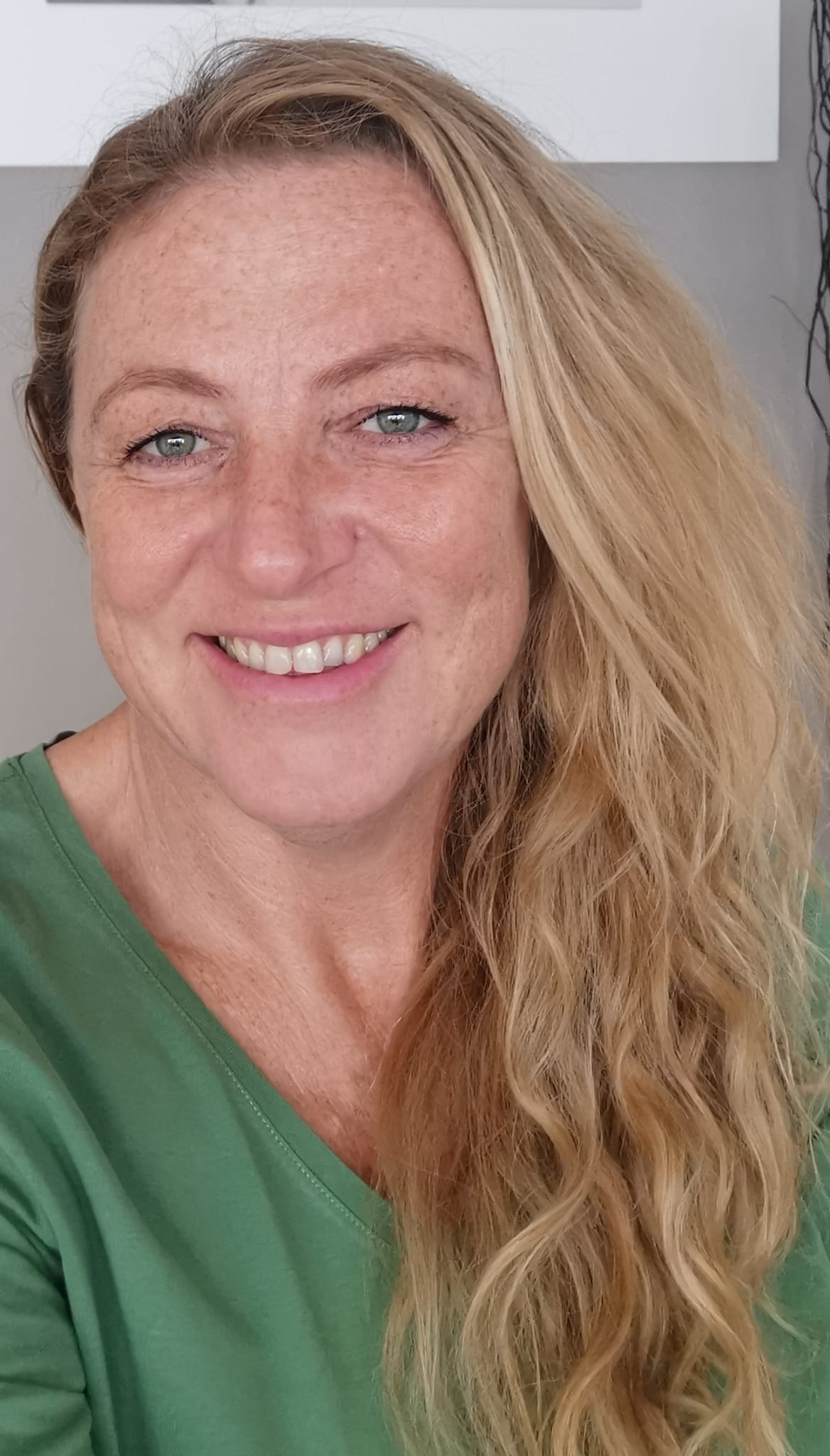

Personal information
- Nationality: Ukrainian
- Born: 28 August 1969 (age 57)
- Height: 186 cm (6 ft 1 in)

Career
Years	Teams
1994	Alcoreca

National team
1994	Ukraine
Honours
Women's volleyball
Representing the Ukraine
European Championship
Bronze medal – third place	1993 Brno-Zlin	Team

Marina Dubinina (born 28 August 1969) is a retired Ukrainian female volleyball player. She was part of the Ukraine women's national volleyball team.

She participated in the 1994 FIVB Volleyball Women's World Championship. On club level she played with Alcoreca.

== Clubs ==
- Alcoreca (1994)
