= Maria Manicova =

Ukrainian volleyball player (born 1974)

Personal information
- Nationality: Ukrainian
- Born: 7 February 1974 (age 52)
- Height: 190 cm (6 ft 3 in)

Career
Years	Teams
1994	Orbita Zaporizhya

National team
1994	Ukraine

Maria Manicova (born 7 February 1974) is a retired Ukrainian female volleyball player. She was part of the Ukraine women's national volleyball team.

She participated in the 1994 FIVB Volleyball Women's World Championship. On club level she played with Orbita Zaporizhya.

== Clubs ==
- Orbita Zaporizhya (1994)
