= Seok Jung-ah =

South Korean volleyball player (born 1971)

Seok Jung-Ah

Personal information
- Nationality: South Korean
- Born: 26 July 1971 (age 55)
- Height: 173 cm (5 ft 8 in)

Volleyball information
- Number: 18 (national team)

Career
Years	Teams
1994	Fuji Film

National team
1994	South Korea

- Seok Jung-ah
- Hangul: 석정아
- Hanja: 石貞兒
- RR: Seok Jeonga
- MR: Sŏk Chŏnga

Seok Jung-Ah (born 26 July 1971) is a retired South Korean volleyball player. She was part of the South Korea women's national volleyball team.

She participated in the 1994 FIVB Volleyball Women's World Championship. On club level she played with Fuji Film.

== Clubs ==
- Fuji Film (1994)
