= Svetlana Soulim =

Ukrainian volleyball player (born 1974)

Personal information
- Nationality: Ukrainian
- Born: 28 February 1974 (age 52)
- Height: 182 cm (6 ft 0 in)

Career
Years	Teams
1994	Olexandria Bila

National team
1994	Ukraine
Honours
Women's volleyball
Representing the Ukraine
European Championship
Bronze medal – third place	1993 Brno-Zlin	Team

Svetlana Soulim (born 28 February 1974) is a retired Ukrainian female volleyball player. She was part of the Ukraine women's national volleyball team.

She participated in the 1994 FIVB Volleyball Women's World Championship. On club level she played with Olexandria Bila.

== Clubs ==
- Olexandria Bila (1994)
