= Elena Arifova =

Azerbaijani volleyball player (born 1972)

Personal information
- Nationality: Azerbaijani
- Born: 20 September 1972 (age 54)
- Height: 180 cm (5 ft 11 in)

Volleyball information
- Number: 2 (national team)

Career
Years	Teams
1994	Neffyag Baku

National team
1994	Azerbaijan

Elena Arifova (born 20 September 1972) is an Azerbaijani former volleyball player. She was part of the Azerbaijan women's national volleyball team.

She participated in the 1994 FIVB Volleyball Women's World Championship. On club level she played with Neffyag Baku.

== Clubs ==
- Neffyag Baku (1994)
