= Daniela Biamonte =

Italian volleyball player (born 1973)

Personal information
- Nationality: Italian
- Born: 3 December 1973 (age 52)
- Height: 187 cm (6 ft 2 in)

Volleyball information
- Number: 18 (national team)

Career
Years	Teams
1994	Brummel Ancona

National team
1994	Italy

Daniela Biamonte (born 3 December 1973) is a retired Italian volleyball player. She was part of the Italy women's national volleyball team.

She participated in the 1994 FIVB Volleyball Women's World Championship. On club level she played with Brummel Ancona.

== Clubs ==
- Brummel Ancona (1994)
