= Barbara De Luca =

Italian volleyball player (born 1975)

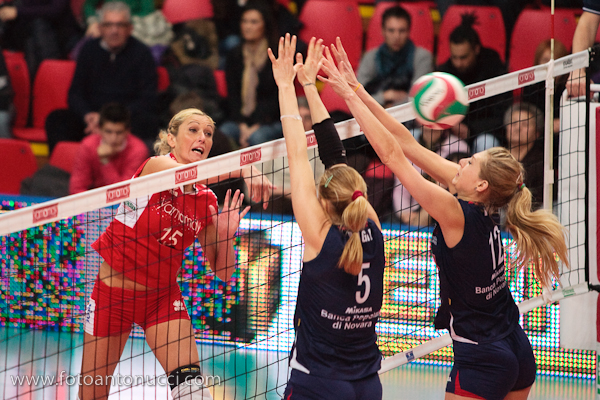

Personal information
- Nationality: Italian
- Born: 19 July 1975 (age 51)
- Height: 1.79 m (5 ft 10 1/2 in)

Volleyball information
- Number: 2 (national team)

Career
Years	Teams
1994	Anthesis Modena

National team
1994-1977	Italy

Barbara De Luca (born 19 July 1975) is a retired Italian volleyball player. She was part of the Italy women's national volleyball team.

== Career ==
De Luca played at the 1994 FIVB Volleyball Women's World Championship.

On club level, De Luca played with Anthesis Modena.

== Clubs ==
- Anthesis Modena (1994)
