= Zdena Zimmermannová =

Czech volleyball player (born 1973)

Personal information
- Nationality: Czech
- Born: 7 November 1973 (age 52)
- Height: 182 m (597 ft 1 in)

Volleyball information
- Number: 2 (national team)

Career
- Years: Team
- 1994: UP Mora Olomouc

National team
- Years: Team
- 1994: Czech Republic

Zdena Zimmermannová (born 7 November 1973) is a retired Czech female volleyball player. She was part of the Czech Republic women's national volleyball team.

She participated in the 1994 FIVB Volleyball Women's World Championship. On club level she played with UP Mora Olomouc.

== Clubs ==
- UP Mora Olomouc (1994)
