= Elena Voronkina =

Ukrainian volleyball player (born 1973)

Personal information
- Nationality: Ukrainian
- Born: 23 June 1973 (age 53)
- Height: 187 cm (6 ft 2 in)

Career
| Years | Teams |
|---|---|
| 1994 | Orbita Zaporizhya |

National team
| 1994 | Ukraine |
Honours
Women's volleyball
Representing the Ukraine
European Championship
| Bronze medal – third place | 1993 Brno-Zlin | Team |

Elena Voronkina (born 23 June 1973) is a retired Ukrainian female volleyball player. She was part of the Ukraine women's national volleyball team.

She participated in the 1994 FIVB Volleyball Women's World Championship. On club level she played with Orbita Zaporizhya.

== Clubs ==
- Orbita Zaporizhya (1994)
