= Eva Štěpánčíková =

Czech volleyball player (born 1972)

Eva Štepáncíková

Personal information
- Nationality: Czech
- Born: 11 December 1972 (age 53)
- Height: 1.80 m (5 ft 11 in)

Volleyball information
- Position: setter
- Current club: Pallavolo Palermo
- Number: 6 (national team)

National team
2002	Czech Republic

Eva Štepáncíková (born 11 December 1972) is a retired Czech female volleyball player, who played as a setter. She was part of the Czech Republic women's national volleyball team.

She participated in the 1994 FIVB Volleyball Women's World Championship, and at the 2002 FIVB Volleyball Women's World Championship in Germany. On club level she played with Pallavolo Palermo.

== Clubs ==
- Pallavolo Palermo (2002)
