= Zdeňka Mocová =

Czech volleyball player (born 1974)

Personal information
- Nationality: Czech
- Born: 17 October 1974 (age 52)
- Height: 184 m (603 ft 8 in)

Volleyball information
- Number: 14 (national team 1994); 2 (national team 2001)

Career
- Years: Team
- 1994: Olymp Praga

National team
- Years: Team
- 1994-2001: Czech Republic

Zdeňka Mocová (born 17 October 1974) is a Czech female former volleyball player. She was part of the Czech Republic women's national volleyball team.

She competed at the 1994 FIVB Volleyball Women's World Championship, and at the 2001 Women's European Volleyball Championship. On club level she played with Olymp Praga in 1994.
