= Michaela Večerková =

Czech volleyball player (born 1973)

Personal information
- Nationality: Czech
- Born: 21 April 1973 (age 53)
- Height: 192 m (629 ft 11 in)

Volleyball information
- Number: 13 (national team)

Career
Years	Teams
1994	BTV Lucerna

National team
1994	Czech Republic

Michaela Večerková (born 21 April 1973) is a retired Czech female volleyball player. She was part of the Czech Republic women's national volleyball team.

She participated in the 1994 FIVB Volleyball Women's World Championship. On club level she played with BTV Lucerna.

== Clubs ==
- BTV Lucerna (1994)
