= Claudea Murariu =

Romanian volleyball player (born 1970)

Personal information
- Nationality: Romanian
- Born: 17 November 1970 (age 55)
- Height: 181 m (593 ft 10 in)

Volleyball information
- Number: 8 (national team)

Career
Years	Teams
1994	Petrodava Piatra Neamt

National team
1994	Romania

Claudea Murariu (born 17 November 1970) is a retired Romanian volleyball player. She was part of the Romania women's national volleyball team.

She participated at the 1994 FIVB Volleyball Women's World Championship in Brazil. On club level she played with Petrodava Piatra Neamt.

== Clubs ==
- Petrodava Piatra Neamt (1994)
