= Christina Schultz =

German volleyball player (born 1969)

Personal information
- Nationality: German
- Born: 10 November 1969 (age 57)
- Height: 1.90 m (6 ft 3 in)
- Weight: 78 kg (172 lb)

Volleyball information

National team
- Years: Team
- 2000: Germany

Christina Schultz (born 10 November 1969) was a German volleyball player. She was part of the Germany women's national volleyball team.

She competed with the national team at the 2000 Summer Olympics in Sydney, Australia, finishing 6th.

== See also ==
- Germany at the 2000 Summer Olympics
