= Karin Horninger =

German volleyball player (born 1971)

Personal information
- Nationality: German
- Born: 18 June 1971 (age 55)
- Height: 187 m (613 ft 6 in)

Volleyball information
- Number: 9 (national team)

Career
Years	Teams
1994	SpVg Feuerbach

National team
1994-1996	Germany

Karin Horninger (born 18 June 1971) was a German female volleyball player.

She was part of the Germany women's national volleyball team at the 1996 Summer Olympics. On club level she played with SpVg Feuerbach.

== Clubs ==
- SpVg Feuerbach (1994)
