= Lee Hyun-joo (volleyball) =

South Korean volleyball player (born 1976)

Personal information
- Nationality: South Korean
- Born: 22 April 1976 (age 50)
- Height: 1.74 m (5 ft 9 in)

Volleyball information
- Number: 5 (national team)

Career
| Years | Teams |
|---|---|
| 1994 | Ho.Nam Oil |

National team
| 1994 | South Korea |

- Lee Hyun-joo
- Hangul: 이현주
- Hanja: 李玄珠
- RR: I Hyeonju
- MR: I Hyŏnju

Lee Hyun-joo (born 22 April 1976) is a retired South Korean female volleyball player. She was part of the South Korea women's national volleyball team.

She participated in the 1994 FIVB Volleyball Women's World Championship. On club level she played with Ho.Nam Oil.

== Clubs ==
- Ho.Nam Oil (1994)
