= Tatyana Menshova =

Russian volleyball player (born 1970)

Personal information
- Nationality: Russian
- Born: 27 January 1970 (age 56); Temirtau, Kazakh SSR, Soviet Union
- Height: 186 cm (6 ft 1 in)
- Weight: 76 kg (168 lb)

Volleyball information
- Number: 7 (national team)

Career
Years	Teams
1986–1992; 1993–1994; 1994–1995; 1995–1997; 1997–1998; 1998–1999; 1999–2001; 2001–2002; 2002–2003; 2003–2004; 2004–2005; 2005–2007; 2007–2008; 2008–2009; 2009–2010	Almaty; VC Uralochka-NTMK; Ito-Yokado; JT Marvelous; VC Uralochka-NTMK; Canottieri Aniene; Vicenza Volley; Palermo; Spezzano; Vicenza Volley; Airone Tortolì; Altamura; Reggio Emilia; Bellinzona; Vicenza Volley

National team
1992; 1993–1997	CIS; Russia
Honours
Women's volleyball
Representing the Unified Team
Olympic Games
Silver medal – second place	1992 Barcelona	Team
Representing Russia
World Championship
Bronze medal – third place	1994 Brazil	Team
World Grand Champions Cup
Bronze medal – third place	1993 Tokyo/Osaka	Team
FIVB World Grand Prix
Gold medal – first place	1997 Kobe	Team
Bronze medal – third place	1993 Hong Kong	Team
Bronze medal – third place	1996 Shangai	Team
European Championships
Gold medal – first place	1993 Brno	Team
Gold medal – first place	1997 Brno	Team
Bronze medal – third place	1995 Arnhem	Team

Tatyana Menshova (born 27 January 1970) is a retired Russian female volleyball player. She played for the Unified Team.

Menshova competed at the 1992 Summer Olympics and for the Russia women's national volleyball team at the 1996 Summer Olympics.

Menshova was also part of the Russia women's national volleyball team winning the European title at the 1993 Women's European Volleyball Championship and 1997 Women's European Volleyball Championship. On club level she played with Uralochka Yekaterinburg.

== Clubs ==
- Uralochka Yekaterinburg (1994)
