= Béatrice Dömeland =

German volleyball player (born 1973)

Beatrice Dömeland

Personal information
- Nationality: German
- Born: 4 August 1973 (age 53)
- Height: 1.78 m (5 ft 10 in)
- Weight: 63 kg (139 lb)

Volleyball information
- Position: setter
- Current club: Dresdner SC
- Number: 2 (national team)

National team
1998–2002	Germany
Honours
Women's volleyball
Representing Germany
European Championship
Bronze medal – third place	2003 Ankara	Team competition

Beatrice Dömeland (born 4 August 1973) was a German female volleyball player. She was part of the Germany women's national volleyball team.

She competed with the national team at the 2000 Summer Olympics in Sydney, Australia, finishing 6th. She played also at the 1998 FIVB Volleyball Women's World Championship, at the 2002 FIVB Volleyball Women's World Championship in Germany, On club level she played with Dresdner SC. and at the 2003 Women's European Volleyball Championship.

== Clubs ==
- Dresdner SC (2002)

== See also ==
- Germany at the 2000 Summer Olympics
