= Ulrike Schwerdtner =

German volleyball player (born 1973)

Personal information
- Nationality: German
- Born: 28 September 1973 (age 53)
- Height: 178 m (584 ft 0 in)

Volleyball information
- Number: 3 (national team)

Career
- Years: Team
- 1994: USC Munster

National team
- Years: Team
- 1994: Germany

Ulrike Schwerdtner (born 28 September 1973) is a retired German female volleyball player. She was part of the Germany women's national volleyball team.

She participated in the 1994 FIVB Volleyball Women's World Championship. On club level she played with USC Munster.

== Clubs ==
- USC Munster (1994)
