= Schwerner =

Schwerner is a surname. Notable people with the surname include:

- Armand Schwerner (1927–1999), American poet
- Michael Schwerner (1939–1964), civil-rights activist murdered in Philadelphia, Mississippi
- Rita Schwerner Bender (born 1942), civil rights activist and lawyer, wife of Michael Schwerner
