= Schwert =

Schwert is a surname. Notable people with the surname include:

- Pius Schwert (1892–1941), American politician
