= Miyuki Shimazaki =

Japanese volleyball player (born 1974)

Personal information
- Born: 13 October 1974 (age 52); Beppu, Oita, Japan
- Height: 1.78 m (5 ft 10 in)

Volleyball information
- Position: Setter
- Number: 17 (national team)

Career
Years	Teams
1994	Hitachi

National team
1994	Japan
Honours
Women's volleyball
Representing Japan
Asian Games
Bronze medal – third place	1994 Hiroshima	Team

Miyuki Shimazaki (島崎 みゆき, Shimazaki Miyuki; born 13 October 1974) is a retired Japanese volleyball player.

Shimazaki was part of the Japanese women's national volleyball team at the 1994 FIVB World Championship in Brazil. On club level she played with Hitachi.

== Clubs ==
- Hitachi (1994)
