= Hilma Caldeira =

Brazilian volleyball player (born 1972)

Personal information
- Full name: Hilma Aparecida Caldeira
- Born: 5 January 1972 (age 54); Diamantina, Minas Gerais, Brazil
- Height: 1.83 m (6 ft 0 in)
- Weight: 63 kg (139 lb)
- Spike: 312 cm (123 in)
- Block: 284 cm (112 in)

Volleyball information
- Position: Outside hitter
- Number: 9

National team
1991–1998	Brazil
Honours
Women's volleyball
Representing Brazil
Olympic Games
Bronze medal – third place	1996 Atlanta	Team
World Championship
Silver medal – second place	1994 Brazil
World Cup
Silver medal – second place	1995 Japan
World Grand Prix
Gold medal – first place	1994 Shanghai
Gold medal – first place	1996 Shanghai
Silver medal – second place	1995 Shanghai
World Grand Champions Cup
Bronze medal – third place	1997 Japan
Pan American Games
Gold medal – first place	1999 Winnipeg	Team
CSV South American Championship
Gold medal – first place	1991 Osasco
Gold medal – first place	1997 Lima
Silver medal – second place	1993 Cusco

Hilma Aparecida Caldeira (born 5 January 1972) is a Brazilian retired volleyball player who competed with the Brazil women's national volleyball team at the 1996 Summer Olympics in Atlanta. There she claimed the bronze medal with the Women's National Team. She also competed at the 1992 Summer Olympics in Barcelona and the 1994 FIVB World Championship in Brazil. On club level she played with L'Acqua di Fiori/Minas.

== Clubs ==
- (Brazil) Minas Tênis Clube (1987–1995)
- (Brazil) Vôlei Osasco (1995–1997)
- (Brazil) Minas Tênis Clube (1997–1998)
- (Italy) Volley Bergamo (1998–1999)
- (Turkey) VakıfBank S.K. (1999–2002)
