= Mirela Bojescu =

Romanian volleyball player (born 1965)

Personal information
- Nationality: Romanian
- Born: 24 June 1965 (age 61)
- Height: 186 m (610 ft 3 in)

Volleyball information
- Number: 6 (national team)

Career
Years	Teams
1994	Etiflex Ommen

National team
1994	Romania

Mirela Bojescu (born 24 June 1965) is a retired Romanian female volleyball player. She was part of the Romania women's national volleyball team.

She participated at the 1994 FIVB Volleyball Women's World Championship in Brazil. On club level she played with Etiflex Ommen.

== Clubs ==
- Etiflex Ommen (1994)
