= 1997 Women's European Volleyball Championship =

Tournament details
- Host country: Czech Republic
- Dates: 27 September – 5 October
- Teams: 12
- Venue: Various (in 2 host cities)

Final positions
- Champions: Russia (15th title)

Tournament awards
- MVP: (Croatia) Barbara Jelić

The 1997 Women's European Volleyball Championship was the 20th edition of the event, organised by Europe's governing volleyball body, the Confédération Européenne de Volleyball. It was hosted in Brno and Zlín, Czech Republic from 27 September to 5 October 1997.

== Participating teams ==
Team	Method of qualification
Belarus	Qualification group D winners
Bulgaria	Qualification group A winners
Croatia	1995 edition second place
Czech Republic	Hosts
Germany	1995 edition fourth place
Italy	Qualification group B winners
Latvia	Qualification promotion round
Netherlands	1995 edition first place
Poland	Qualification group E winners
Romania	Qualification promotion round
Russia	1995 edition third place
Ukraine	Qualification group C winners

== Format ==
The tournament was played in two different stages. In the first stage, the twelve participants were divided in two groups of six teams each. A single round-robin format was played within each group to determine the teams' group position. The second stage of the tournament consisted of two sets of semifinals to determine the tournament final ranking. The group stage firsts and seconds played the semifinals for 1st to 4th place, group stage thirds and fourths played the 5th to 8th place semifinals and the remaining four teams which finished group stages as fifth and sixth ended all tied in final ranking at 9th place. The pairing of the semifinals was made so teams played against the opposite group teams which finished in a different position (1st played against 2nd, 3rd played against 4th).

== Pools composition ==
Pool A	Pool B
Belarus	Croatia
Bulgaria	Czech Republic
Latvia	Germany
Netherlands	Italy
Poland	Romania
Russia	Ukraine

== Venues ==
Pool A	Pool B and Final round	Tournament host cities
Zlín	Brno	Tournament host cities

== Preliminary round ==
- All times are Central European Summer Time (UTC+02:00).

=== Pool A ===
- venue location: Zlín, Czech Republic

Pos	Team	Pld	W	L	Pts	SW	SL	SR	SPW	SPL	SPR	Qualification
1	Russia	5	5	0	10	15	2	7.500	237	110	2.155	Semifinals
2	Bulgaria	5	3	2	8	11	6	1.833	202	163	1.239	Semifinals
3	Poland	5	3	2	8	10	7	1.429	200	185	1.081	5th–8th place
4	Latvia	5	2	3	7	6	11	0.545	174	229	0.760	5th–8th place
5	Netherlands	5	1	4	6	6	12	0.500	192	235	0.817	
6	Belarus	5	1	4	6	4	14	0.286	174	257	0.677	

Date	Time		Score		Set 1	Set 2	Set 3	Set 4	Set 5	Total	Report
27 Sep	14:30	Bulgaria	3–0	Netherlands	15–5	15–9	15–10			45–24	Report
27 Sep	17:00	Poland	3–0	Latvia	15–7	15–9	15–10			45–26	Report
27 Sep	20:00	Belarus	1–3	Russia	11–15	3–15	15–9	4–15		33–54	Report
28 Sep	14:30	Bulgaria	3–0	Poland	15–7	15–8	15–5			45–20	Report
28 Sep	17:00	Latvia	3–0	Belarus	15–12	16–14	15–8			46–34	Report
28 Sep	20:00	Netherlands	0–3	Russia	11–15	5–15	5–15			21–45	Report
29 Sep	14:30	Belarus	3–2	Bulgaria	15–13	3–15	15–13	9–15	15–11	57–67	Report
29 Sep	17:00	Russia	3–0	Latvia	15–2	15–5	15–8			45–15	Report
29 Sep	20:00	Poland	3–1	Netherlands	15–10	4–15	15–13	15–4		49–42	Report
1 Oct	14:30	Bulgaria	0–3	Russia	3–15	10–15	12–15			25–45	Report
1 Oct	17:00	Poland	3–0	Belarus	15–5	15–7	15–12			45–24	Report
1 Oct	20:00	Netherlands	2–3	Latvia	15–12	15–13	7–15	10–15	13–15	60–70	Report
2 Oct	14:30	Russia	3–1	Poland	15–6	15–13	3–15	15–7		48–41	Report
2 Oct	17:00	Belarus	0–3	Netherlands	4–15	12–15	10–15			26–45	Report
2 Oct	20:00	Latvia	0–3	Bulgaria	2–15	9–15	6–15			17–45	Report

=== Pool B ===
- venue location: Brno, Czech Republic

Pos	Team	Pld	W	L	Pts	SW	SL	SR	SPW	SPL	SPR	Qualification
1	Croatia	5	5	0	10	15	1	15.000	240	139	1.727	Semifinals
2	Czech Republic	5	3	2	8	10	6	1.667	208	174	1.195	Semifinals
3	Italy	5	3	2	8	10	7	1.429	221	209	1.057	5th–8th place
4	Ukraine	5	2	3	7	6	10	0.600	187	221	0.846	5th–8th place
5	Germany	5	1	4	6	4	12	0.333	174	227	0.767	
6	Romania	5	1	4	6	3	12	0.250	156	216	0.722	

Date	Time		Score		Set 1	Set 2	Set 3	Set 4	Set 5	Total	Report
27 Sep	14:30	Italy	3–0	Ukraine	15–12	15–9	15–11			45–32	Report
27 Sep	17:00	Czech Republic	3–0	Romania	15–11	15–7	15–8			45–26	Report
27 Sep	20:00	Germany	0–3	Croatia	7–15	2–15	9–15			18–45	Report
28 Sep	14:30	Ukraine	3–0	Romania	15–11	15–10	15–13			45–34	Report
28 Sep	17:00	Croatia	3–0	Czech Republic	15–4	15–9	15–8			45–21	Report
28 Sep	20:00	Italy	3–1	Germany	15–10	14–16	16–14	15–10		60–50	Report
29 Sep	14:30	Romania	0–3	Croatia	7–15	6–15	13–15			26–45	Report
29 Sep	17:00	Czech Republic	3–0	Italy	15–9	15–5	15–7			45–21	Report
29 Sep	20:00	Germany	3–0	Ukraine	15–7	15–9	15–13			45–29	Report
1 Oct	14:30	Italy	3–0	Romania	15–5	15–10	15–7			45–22	Report
1 Oct	17:00	Germany	0–3	Czech Republic	10–15	12–15	3–15			25–45	Report
1 Oct	20:00	Ukraine	0–3	Croatia	7–15	11–15	6–15			24–45	Report
2 Oct	14:30	Romania	3–0	Germany	17–15	16–14	15–7			48–36	Report
2 Oct	17:00	Croatia	3–1	Italy	16–14	14–16	15–13	15–7		60–50	Report
2 Oct	20:00	Czech Republic	1–3	Ukraine	15–11	14–16	11–15	12–15		52–57	Report

== Final round ==
- venue location: Brno, Czech Republic
- All times are Central European Summer Time (UTC+02:00).

=== 5th–8th place ===
- Pools A and B third and fourth positions play each other.

Semifinals
4 Oct
Poland	3
Ukraine	0
4 Oct
Latvia	0
Italy	3

5th place
5 Oct
Poland	0
Italy	3
7th place
5 Oct
Ukraine	3
Latvia	1

==== 5th–8th semifinals ====
Date	Time		Score		Set 1	Set 2	Set 3	Set 4	Set 5	Total	Report
4 Oct	10:30	Poland	3–0	Ukraine	15–8	15–10	15–13			45–31	Report
4 Oct	14:30	Latvia	0–3	Italy	9–15	4–15	12–15			25–45	Report

==== 7th place match ====
Date	Time		Score		Set 1	Set 2	Set 3	Set 4	Set 5	Total	Report
5 Oct	10:00	Ukraine	3–1	Latvia	13–15	15–5	15–9	15–7		58–36	Report

==== 5th place match ====
Date	Time		Score		Set 1	Set 2	Set 3	Set 4	Set 5	Total	Report
5 Oct	12:30	Poland	0–3	Italy	13–15	9–15	10–15			32–45	Report

=== Final ===
- Pools A and B first and second positions play each other.

Semifinals
4 Oct
Russia	3
Czech Republic	0
4 Oct
Bulgaria	1
Croatia	3

Final
5 Oct
Russia	3
Croatia	0
3rd place
5 Oct
Czech Republic	3
Bulgaria	0

==== Semifinals ====
Date	Time		Score		Set 1	Set 2	Set 3	Set 4	Set 5	Total	Report
4 Oct	17:00	Russia	3–0	Czech Republic	15–4	15–2	15–1			45–7	Report
4 Oct	20:00	Bulgaria	1–3	Croatia	2–15	15–10	12–15	12–15		41–55	Report

==== 3rd place match ====
Date	Time		Score		Set 1	Set 2	Set 3	Set 4	Set 5	Total	Report
5 Oct	15:00	Bulgaria	0–3	Czech Republic	13–15	10–15	7–15			30–45	Report

==== Final ====
Date	Time		Score		Set 1	Set 2	Set 3	Set 4	Set 5	Total	Report
5 Oct	18:00	Russia	3–0	Croatia	15–7	15–12	15–9			45–28	Report

== Final ranking ==
Place	Team
1st place, gold medalist(s)	Russia
2nd place, silver medalist(s)	Croatia
3rd place, bronze medalist(s)	Czech Republic
4.	Bulgaria
5.	Italy
6.	Poland
7.	Ukraine
8.	Latvia
9.	Netherlands
9.	Germany
9.	Belarus
9.	Romania

1997 Women's European champions

Russia
15th title

Team Roster
Evgenya Artamonova, Elena Batoukhtina, Anastasia Belikova, Elena Godina, Tatyana Gracheva, Tatyana Menchova, Natalya Morozova, Natalia Safronova, Olga Tchoukanova, Irina Tebenikhina, Elizaveta Tichtchenko and Elena Vassilevskaya.
Head coach: Nikolay Karpol.

== Individual awards ==
- Most valuable player: Barbara Jelić (CRO)
- Best spiker: Evgenya Artamonova (RUS)
- Best blocker: Michaela Večerková (CZE)
- Best setter: Irina Kirillova (CRO)
