= Aki Nagatomi =

Japanese volleyball player

Personal information
- Born: 15 July 1969 (age 57); Kitakyushu, Fukuoka, Japan
- Height: 173 cm (5 ft 8 in)

Volleyball information
- Position: Setter
- Number: 3

National team
1993–1996	Japan
Honours
Women's volleyball
Representing Japan
Goodwill Games
Bronze medal – third place	1994 Saint Petersburg	Team
Asian Games
Bronze medal – third place	1994 Hiroshima	Team

Aki Nagatomi (永富 有紀, Nagatomi Aki) (born 15 July 1969) is a Japanese former volleyball player who competed at the 1996 Summer Olympics in Atlanta, where she finished in ninth place. Nagatomi won the bronze medal at the 1994 Goodwill Games in Saint Petersburg.
