= 1994 FIVB Volleyball World Grand Prix =

International women's volleyball tournament

1994 FIVB World Grand Prix
Tournament details
- Host country: China (Group 1 Final)
- Dates: 19 August – 11 September
- Teams: 12
- Venue: 1 (in 1 host city)

Final positions
- Champions: Brazil (1st title)
- Runners-up: Cuba
- Third place: China
- Fourth place: Japan

Tournament awards
- MVP: (Brazil) Fernanda Venturini
- Best Setter: (Brazil) Fernanda Venturini
- Best OH: (Cuba) Mireya Luis; (Brazil) Ana Moser
- Best MB: (Cuba) Regla Torres; (Brazil) Ana Paula Connelly
- Best OPP: (Japan) Motoko Obayashi

The 1994 FIVB World Grand Prix was the second edition of the women's volleyball tournament, annually arranged by FIVB. It was played by eight countries from 19 August to 11 September 1994. The final round was staged in Shanghai.

== Preliminary round ==
=== Ranking ===
The host China and top three teams in the preliminary round advance to the final round.

| Qualified for the final round |
| Qualified as hosts for the final round |

| Pos | Team | Pld | W | L | Pts | SW | SL | SR | SPW | SPL | SPR | Qualification |
|---|---|---|---|---|---|---|---|---|---|---|---|---|
| 1 | Cuba | 9 | 9 | 0 | 18 | 27 | 4 | 6.750 | 445 | 262 | 1.698 | Final round |
| 2 | Japan | 9 | 8 | 1 | 17 | 24 | 12 | 2.000 | 478 | 385 | 1.242 | Final round |
| 3 | Brazil | 9 | 7 | 2 | 16 | 25 | 8 | 3.125 | 459 | 325 | 1.412 | Final round |
| 4 | South Korea | 9 | 7 | 2 | 16 | 24 | 9 | 2.667 | 461 | 329 | 1.401 | |
| 5 | United States | 9 | 7 | 2 | 16 | 24 | 12 | 2.000 | 473 | 403 | 1.174 | |
| 6 | China (Note: Qualified as hosts) (H) | 9 | 6 | 3 | 15 | 21 | 10 | 2.100 | 416 | 320 | 1.300 | Final round |
| 7 | Russia | 9 | 4 | 5 | 13 | 19 | 20 | 0.950 | 476 | 487 | 0.977 | |
| 8 | Italy | 9 | 2 | 7 | 11 | 12 | 22 | 0.545 | 362 | 453 | 0.799 | |
| 9 | Netherlands | 9 | 2 | 7 | 11 | 8 | 22 | 0.364 | 296 | 393 | 0.753 | |
| 10 | Germany | 9 | 1 | 8 | 10 | 5 | 25 | 0.200 | 294 | 433 | 0.679 | |
| 11 | Peru | 9 | 1 | 8 | 10 | 5 | 25 | 0.200 | 267 | 421 | 0.634 | |
| 12 | Chinese Taipei | 9 | 0 | 9 | 9 | 2 | 27 | 0.074 | 220 | 436 | 0.505 | |

(H) Host

=== First round ===
==== Group A ====
- Venue: Seoul, South Korea

| Date | | Score | | Set 1 | Set 2 | Set 3 | Set 4 | Set 5 | Total |
|---|---|---|---|---|---|---|---|---|---|
| 19 Ago | South Korea | 3–0 | Germany | 15–5 | 15–2 | 15–9 | | | 45–16 |
| 19 Ago | United States | 3–2 | Italy | 8–15 | 15–7 | 14–16 | 15–7 | 18–16 | 70–61 |
| 20 Ago | South Korea | 3–1 | Italy | 14–16 | 17–15 | 15–9 | 15–6 | | 61–46 |
| 20 Ago | United States | 3–0 | Germany | 15–5 | 15–9 | 15–4 | | | 45–18 |
| 21 Ago | United States | 3–2 | South Korea | 9–15 | 11–15 | 15–7 | 15–13 | 15–9 | 65–59 |
| 21 Ago | Italy | 3–1 | Germany | 12–15 | 15–6 | 15–10 | 15–9 | | 57–40 |

==== Group B ====
- Venue: Taipei, Taiwan

| Date | | Score | | Set 1 | Set 2 | Set 3 | Set 4 | Set 5 | Total |
|---|---|---|---|---|---|---|---|---|---|
| 19 Ago | Japan | 3–2 | Russia | 15–4 | 15–13 | 10–15 | 10–15 | 15–13 | 65–60 |
| 19 Ago | Cuba | 3–0 | Chinese Taipei | 15–7 | 15–5 | 15–3 | | | 45–15 |
| 20 Ago | Cuba | 3–0 | Japan | 15–13 | 15–4 | 15–11 | | | 45–28 |
| 20 Ago | Russia | 3–1 | Chinese Taipei | 15–10 | 16–17 | 15–10 | 15–6 | | 61–43 |
| 21 Ago | Cuba | 3–2 | Russia | 15–6 | 5–15 | 15–1 | 10–15 | 15–12 | 60–49 |
| 21 Ago | Japan | 3–0 | Chinese Taipei | 15–7 | 15–6 | 15–4 | | | 45–17 |

==== Group C ====
- Venue: Jakarta, Indonesia

| Date | | Score | | Set 1 | Set 2 | Set 3 | Set 4 | Set 5 | Total |
|---|---|---|---|---|---|---|---|---|---|
| 19 Ago | Brazil | 3–0 | Netherlands | 15–4 | 15–5 | 15–4 | | | 45–13 |
| 19 Ago | China | 3–0 | Peru | 15–4 | 15–4 | 15–11 | | | 45–19 |
| 20 Ago | Brazil | 3–0 | Peru | 15–8 | 15–7 | 15–7 | | | 45–22 |
| 20 Ago | China | 3–0 | Netherlands | 15–11 | 15–4 | 15–12 | | | 45–27 |
| 21 Ago | Netherlands | 3–0 | Peru | 15–6 | 15–2 | 15–5 | | | 45–13 |
| 21 Ago | Brazil | 3–1 | China | 15–11 | 13–15 | 15–8 | 15–11 | | 58–45 |

=== Second round ===
==== Group D ====
- Venue: Bangkok, Thailand

| Date | | Score | | Set 1 | Set 2 | Set 3 | Set 4 | Set 5 | Total |
|---|---|---|---|---|---|---|---|---|---|
| 26 Ago | South Korea | 3–0 | Peru | 15–6 | 15–7 | 15–3 | | | 45–16 |
| 26 Ago | Cuba | 3–0 | Italy | 15–3 | 15–4 | 15–6 | | | 45–13 |
| 27 Ago | Cuba | 3–1 | South Korea | 9–15 | 15–9 | 15–8 | 15–12 | | 54–44 |
| 27 Ago | Italy | 3–0 | Peru | 15–12 | 15–10 | 15–7 | | | 45–29 |
| 28 Ago | Cuba | 3–0 | Peru | 16–14 | 15–11 | 15–3 | | | 46–28 |
| 28 Ago | South Korea | 3–0 | Italy | 15–9 | 15–8 | 15–4 | | | 45–21 |

==== Group E ====
- Venue: Tokyo, Japan

| Date | | Score | | Set 1 | Set 2 | Set 3 | Set 4 | Set 5 | Total |
|---|---|---|---|---|---|---|---|---|---|
| 26 Ago | United States | 3–0 | Germany | 15–2 | 15–7 | 15–10 | | | 45–19 |
| 26 Ago | Japan | 3–0 | Netherlands | 15–10 | 15–3 | 15–7 | | | 45–20 |
| 27 Ago | Japan | 3–0 | Germany | 15–11 | 15–7 | 15–10 | | | 45–28 |
| 27 Ago | United States | 3–0 | Netherlands | 15–7 | 15–5 | 15–6 | | | 45–18 |
| 28 Ago | Japan | 3–2 | United States | 15–11 | 6–15 | 12–15 | 15–5 | 15–8 | 63–54 |
| 28 Ago | Netherlands | 3–1 | Germany | 12–15 | 15–7 | 17–15 | 15–12 | | 59–49 |

==== Group F ====
- Venue: Macau

| Date | | Score | | Set 1 | Set 2 | Set 3 | Set 4 | Set 5 | Total |
|---|---|---|---|---|---|---|---|---|---|
| 26 Ago | Brazil | 3–0 | Chinese Taipei | 15–3 | 15–6 | 15–11 | | | 45–20 |
| 26 Ago | China | 3–1 | Russia | 15–4 | 13–15 | 15–7 | 15–12 | | 58–38 |
| 27 Ago | Brazil | 3–0 | Russia | 15–7 | 15–12 | 15–3 | | | 45–22 |
| 27 Ago | China | 3–0 | Chinese Taipei | 15–5 | 15–6 | 15–7 | | | 45–18 |
| 28 Ago | Russia | 3–0 | Chinese Taipei | 15–6 | 15–11 | 15–8 | | | 45–25 |
| 28 Ago | Brazil | 3–1 | China | 15–10 | 15–12 | 12–15 | 15–10 | | 57–47 |

=== Third round ===
==== Group G ====
- Venue: Fukuoka, Japan

| Date | | Score | | Set 1 | Set 2 | Set 3 | Set 4 | Set 5 | Total |
|---|---|---|---|---|---|---|---|---|---|
| 2 Sep | Russia | 3–2 | Brazil | 17–15 | 5–15 | 15–17 | 15–12 | 15–7 | 67–66 |
| 2 Sep | Japan | 3–1 | Italy | 15–8 | 5–15 | 15–10 | 15–9 | | 50–42 |
| 3 Sep | Japan | 3–2 | Russia | 15–11 | 8–15 | 15–10 | 15–17 | 15–13 | 68–66 |
| 3 Sep | Brazil | 3–0 | Italy | 15–7 | 15–1 | 15–12 | | | 45–20 |
| 4 Sep | Japan | 3–2 | Brazil | 13–15 | 11–15 | 15–5 | 15–6 | 15–12 | 69–53 |
| 4 Sep | Russia | 3–2 | Italy | 12–15 | 15–7 | 15–10 | 11–15 | 15–10 | 68–57 |

==== Group H ====
- Venue: Guangzhou, China

| Date | | Score | | Set 1 | Set 2 | Set 3 | Set 4 | Set 5 | Total |
|---|---|---|---|---|---|---|---|---|---|
| 2 Sep | Cuba | 3–0 | Germany | 15–9 | 15–9 | 15–6 | | | 45–24 |
| 2 Sep | China | 3–0 | Chinese Taipei | 15–4 | 15–2 | 15–9 | | | 45–15 |
| 3 Sep | Cuba | 3–0 | Chinese Taipei | 15–7 | 15–5 | 15–8 | | | 45–20 |
| 3 Sep | China | 3–0 | Germany | 15–9 | 15–10 | 15–9 | | | 45–28 |
| 4 Sep | Germany | 3–1 | Chinese Taipei | 15–8 | 15–17 | 15–12 | 15–10 | | 60–47 |
| 4 Sep | Cuba | 3–1 | China | 15–17 | 15–13 | 15–7 | 15–4 | | 60–41 |

==== Group I ====
- Venue: Manila, Philippines

| Date | | Score | | Set 1 | Set 2 | Set 3 | Set 4 | Set 5 | Total |
|---|---|---|---|---|---|---|---|---|---|
| 2 Sep | United States | 3–1 | Netherlands | 15–13 | 12–15 | 15–6 | 15–12 | | 57–46 |
| 2 Sep | South Korea | 3–1 | Peru | 15–13 | 15–12 | 11–15 | 15–5 | | 56–45 |
| 3 Sep | Peru | 3–1 | Netherlands | 2–15 | 15–4 | 15–9 | 15–11 | | 47–39 |
| 3 Sep | South Korea | 3–1 | United States | 14–16 | 15–12 | 15–8 | 15–1 | | 59–37 |
| 4 Sep | South Korea | 3–0 | Netherlands | 15–5 | 17–15 | 15–9 | | | 47–29 |
| 4 Sep | United States | 3–1 | Peru | 15–10 | 10–15 | 15–13 | 15–10 | | 55–48 |

== Final round ==
- Venue: Shanghai, China

| Date | | Score | | Set 1 | Set 2 | Set 3 | Set 4 | Set 5 | Total |
|---|---|---|---|---|---|---|---|---|---|
| 9 Sep | Brazil | 3–2 | Cuba | 15–12 | 14–16 | 15–12 | 10–15 | 15–13 | 69–68 |
| 9 Sep | China | 3–0 | Japan | 16–14 | 16–14 | 17–15 | | | 49–43 |
| 10 Sep | Brazil | 3–1 | China | 15–2 | 10–15 | 15–6 | 15–13 | | 55–36 |
| 10 Sep | Cuba | 3–0 | Japan | 15–10 | 15–2 | 15–5 | | | 45–17 |
| 11 Sep | Brazil | 3–1 | Japan | 15–9 | 11–15 | 15–8 | 15–7 | | 56–39 |
| 11 Sep | Cuba | 3–0 | China | 15–10 | 15–8 | 15–9 | | | 45–27 |

=== Final ranking ===
| Pos | Team | Pld | W | L | Pts | SW | SL | SR | SPW | SPL | SPR |
|---|---|---|---|---|---|---|---|---|---|---|---|
| 1 | Brazil | 3 | 3 | 0 | 6 | 9 | 4 | 2.250 | 180 | 143 | 1.259 |
| 2 | Cuba | 3 | 2 | 1 | 5 | 8 | 3 | 2.667 | 158 | 113 | 1.398 |
| 3 | China | 3 | 1 | 2 | 4 | 4 | 6 | 0.667 | 112 | 143 | 0.783 |
| 4 | Japan | 3 | 0 | 3 | 3 | 1 | 9 | 0.111 | 99 | 150 | 0.660 |

== Final standings ==
| Place | Team |
|---|---|
| 1st place, gold medalist(s) | Brazil |
| 2nd place, silver medalist(s) | Cuba |
| 3rd place, bronze medalist(s) | China |
| 4 | Japan |
| 5 | South Korea |
| 6 | United States |
| 7 | Russia |
| 8 | Italy |
| 9 | Netherlands |
| 10 | Germany |
| 11 | Peru |
| 12 | Chinese Taipei |

1994 FIVB World Grand Prix winners

Brazil
First title

== Individual awards ==
- Most valuable player: Fernanda Venturini (BRA)
- Best scorer : Ana Moser (BRA)
- Best spiker: Hilma Caldeira (BRA)
- Best blocker: Ana Paula Connelly (BRA)
- Best server: Mireya Luis (CUB)
- Best receiver: Asako Tajimi (JPN)
- Best setter: Fernanda Venturini (BRA)
- Best outside spikers
  (Cuba) Mireya Luis
  (Brazil) Ana Moser
- Best middle blocker
  (Cuba) Regla Torres
  (Brazil) Ana Paula Connelly
- Best opposite spiker
  (Brazil) Marcia Cunha

== Statistics leaders ==
- Only players whose teams advanced to the semifinals are ranked.

Best scorers

| Rank | Name | Points |
|---|---|---|
| 1 | (Brazil) Moser, Ana Beatriz | 215 |
| 2 | (Japan) Obayashi, Motoko | 196 |
| 3 | (Cuba) Luis, Mireya | 187 |
| 4 | (Cuba) Torres, Regla | 166 |
| 5 | (China) Sun Yue | 159 |
| 6 | (Brazil) Caldeira, Hilma | 150 |
| 7 | (Japan) Yamauchi, Mika | 142 |
| 8 | (China) Cui Yongmei | 133 |
| 9 | (Cuba) Gato, Idalmis | 109 |
| 10 | (Brazil) Cunha, Marcia | 104 |

Best spikers

| Rank | Name | %Eff |
|---|---|---|
| 1 | (Brazil) Caldeira, Hilma | 37.56 |
| 2 | (Cuba) Luis, Mireya | 36.55 |
| 3 | (Cuba) Torres, Regla | 35.11 |
| 4 | (China) Cui Yongmei | 33.23 |
| 5 | (Japan) Obayashi, Motoko | 32.67 |

Best blockers

| Rank | Name | Avg |
|---|---|---|
| 1 | (Brazil) Rodriguez, Ana Paula | 1.40 |
| 2 | (Cuba) Torres, Regla | 1.10 |
| 3 | (Cuba) Carvajal, Magalys | 1.02 |
| 4 | (China) Lai Yawen | 0.96 |
| 5 | (Japan) Yoshihara, Tomoko | 0.91 |

Best servers

| Rank | Name | Avg |
|---|---|---|
| 1 | (Cuba) Luis, Mireya | 0.37 |
| 2 | (Brazil) Moser, Ana | 0.36 |
| 3 | (Brazil) Venturini, Fernanda | 0.32 |
| 4 | (China) Cui Yongmei | 0.26 |
| 5 | (Japan) Yoshihara, Tomoko | 0.25 |

Best diggers

| Rank | Name | Avg |
|---|---|---|
| 1 | (Japan) Fukuda, Kiyoko | 4.19 |
| 2 | (China) Wang Yi | 3.80 |
| 3 | (Cuba) Luis, Mireya | 2.97 |

Best receivers

| Rank | Name | %Succ |
|---|---|---|
| 1 | (Japan) Tajimi, Asako | 71.33 |
| 2 | (China) Wang Yi | 70.78 |
| 3 | (China) Sun Yue | 68.78 |

Best setters

| Rank | Name | Avg | %Succ |
|---|---|---|---|
| 1 | (Brazil) Venturini, Fernanda | 12.57 | 59.23% |
| 2 | (Japan) Nagatomi, Aki | 9.18 | 50.24% |
| 3 | (China) Su Huijuan | 7.71 | 52.45% |
| 4 | (Cuba) Costa, Marlenis | 6.11 | 56.45% |
| 5 | (Cuba) Izquierdo, Lilia | 5.12 | 47.52% |
