= 1994 FIVB Women's Volleyball World Championship =

1994 FIVB Women's World Championship

Tournament details
- Host country: Brazil
- Dates: 17–30 October
- Teams: 16
- Venues: 2 (in 2 host cities)
- Officially opened by: Itamar Franco

Final positions
- Champions: Cuba (2nd title)
- Runners-up: Brazil
- Third place: Russia
- Fourth place: South Korea

Tournament awards
- MVP: (Cuba) Regla Torres
- Best Setter: (Brazil) Fernanda Venturini
- Best OH: (Russia) Elena Batukhtina; (Cuba) Mireya Luis
- Best MB: (Russia) Regla Torres; (Cuba) Magalys Carvajal
- Best OPP: (Brazil) Marcia Fu

The 1994 FIVB Women's World Championship was the twelfth edition of the tournament, organised by the world's governing body, the FIVB. It was held from 17 to 30 October 1994 in São Paulo and Belo Horizonte, Brazil.

== Teams ==
Group A

- Brazil
- Germany
- Romania
- South Korea

Group B

- Cuba
- Netherlands
- Peru
- Azerbaijan

Group C

- China
- Russia
- Italy
- Ukraine

Group D

- United States
- Japan
- Kenya
- Czech Republic

== Results ==
=== First round ===
==== Pool A ====
Venue: Ginasio de Mineirinho, Belo Horizonte

| Pos | Team | Pld | W | L | Pts | SW | SL | SR | SPW | SPL | SPR | Qualification |
|---|---|---|---|---|---|---|---|---|---|---|---|---|
| 1 | Brazil | 3 | 3 | 0 | 6 | 9 | 1 | 9.000 | 145 | 64 | 2.266 | Quarterfinals |
| 2 | Germany | 3 | 2 | 1 | 5 | 6 | 3 | 2.000 | 109 | 91 | 1.198 | Play-offs for quarterfinals |
| 3 | South Korea | 3 | 1 | 2 | 4 | 4 | 6 | 0.667 | 123 | 117 | 1.051 | Play-offs for quarterfinals |
| 4 | Romania | 3 | 0 | 3 | 3 | 0 | 9 | 0.000 | 30 | 135 | 0.222 | |

| Date | Time | | Score | | Set 1 | Set 2 | Set 3 | Set 4 | Set 5 | Total |
|---|---|---|---|---|---|---|---|---|---|---|
| 21 Oct | 12:30 | Germany | 3–0 | South Korea | 16–14 | 15–10 | 16–14 | | | 47–38 |
| 21 Oct | 16:00 | Brazil | 3–0 | Romania | 15–2 | 15–2 | 15–3 | | | 45–7 |
| 22 Oct | 13:30 | South Korea | 3–0 | Romania | 15–2 | 15–3 | 15–10 | | | 45–15 |
| 22 Oct | 16:00 | Brazil | 3–0 | Germany | 15–5 | 15–7 | 15–5 | | | 45–17 |
| 23 Oct | 13:30 | Germany | 3–0 | Romania | 15–2 | 15–2 | 15–4 | | | 45–8 |
| 23 Oct | 16:00 | Brazil | 3–1 | South Korea | 10–15 | 15–10 | 15–7 | 15–8 | | 55–40 |

==== Pool B ====
Venue: Ginásio do Ibirapuera, São Paulo

| Pos | Team | Pld | W | L | Pts | SW | SL | SR | SPW | SPL | SPR | Qualification |
|---|---|---|---|---|---|---|---|---|---|---|---|---|
| 1 | Cuba | 3 | 3 | 0 | 6 | 9 | 0 | MAX | 135 | 68 | 1.985 | Quarterfinals |
| 2 | Netherlands | 3 | 2 | 1 | 5 | 6 | 4 | 1.500 | 124 | 103 | 1.204 | Play-offs for quarterfinals |
| 3 | Azerbaijan | 3 | 1 | 2 | 4 | 4 | 6 | 0.667 | 113 | 132 | 0.856 | Play-offs for quarterfinals |
| 4 | Peru | 3 | 0 | 3 | 3 | 0 | 9 | 0.000 | 66 | 135 | 0.489 | |

| Date | Time | | Score | | Set 1 | Set 2 | Set 3 | Set 4 | Set 5 | Total |
|---|---|---|---|---|---|---|---|---|---|---|
| 21 Oct | 18:00 | Netherlands | 3–1 | Azerbaijan | 15–8 | 15–5 | 11–15 | 15–10 | | 56–38 |
| 21 Oct | 20:00 | Cuba | 3–0 | Peru | 15–9 | 15–1 | 15–5 | | | 45–15 |
| 22 Oct | 18:00 | Cuba | 3–0 | Netherlands | 15–4 | 15–9 | 15–10 | | | 45–23 |
| 22 Oct | 20:00 | Azerbaijan | 3–0 | Peru | 15–12 | 15–13 | 15–6 | | | 45–31 |
| 23 Oct | 18:00 | Cuba | 3–0 | Azerbaijan | 15–9 | 15–9 | 15–12 | | | 45–30 |
| 23 Oct | 20:00 | Netherlands | 3–0 | Peru | 15–8 | 15–7 | 15–5 | | | 45–20 |

==== Pool C ====
Venue: Ginasio de Mineirinho, Belo Horizonte

| Pos | Team | Pld | W | L | Pts | SW | SL | SR | SPW | SPL | SPR | Qualification |
|---|---|---|---|---|---|---|---|---|---|---|---|---|
| 1 | China | 3 | 3 | 0 | 6 | 9 | 2 | 4.500 | 147 | 109 | 1.349 | Quarterfinals |
| 2 | Russia | 3 | 2 | 1 | 5 | 6 | 4 | 1.500 | 127 | 119 | 1.067 | Play-offs for quarterfinals |
| 3 | Ukraine | 3 | 1 | 2 | 4 | 5 | 8 | 0.625 | 151 | 154 | 0.981 | Play-offs for quarterfinals |
| 4 | Italy | 3 | 0 | 3 | 3 | 3 | 9 | 0.333 | 110 | 153 | 0.719 | |

| Date | Time | | Score | | Set 1 | Set 2 | Set 3 | Set 4 | Set 5 | Total |
|---|---|---|---|---|---|---|---|---|---|---|
| 21 Oct | 18:00 | China | 3–1 | Italy | 8–15 | 15–3 | 16–14 | 15–5 | | 54–37 |
| 21 Oct | 20:00 | Russia | 3–1 | Ukraine | 8–15 | 16–14 | 15–13 | 15–11 | | 54–53 |
| 22 Oct | 18:00 | China | 3–0 | Russia | 15–13 | 15–12 | 15–3 | | | 45–28 |
| 22 Oct | 20:00 | Ukraine | 3–2 | Italy | 15–4 | 5–15 | 4–15 | 15–6 | 15–12 | 54–52 |
| 23 Oct | 18:00 | Russia | 3–0 | Italy | 15–7 | 15–9 | 15–5 | | | 45–21 |
| 23 Oct | 20:00 | China | 3–1 | Ukraine | 15–8 | 15–10 | 3–15 | 15–11 | | 48–44 |

==== Pool D ====
Venue: Ginásio do Ibirapuera, São Paulo

| Pos | Team | Pld | W | L | Pts | SW | SL | SR | SPW | SPL | SPR | Qualification |
|---|---|---|---|---|---|---|---|---|---|---|---|---|
| 1 | United States | 3 | 3 | 0 | 6 | 9 | 1 | 9.000 | 141 | 54 | 2.611 | Quarterfinals |
| 2 | Japan | 3 | 2 | 1 | 5 | 7 | 3 | 2.333 | 127 | 77 | 1.649 | Play-offs for quarterfinals |
| 3 | Czech Republic | 3 | 1 | 2 | 4 | 3 | 6 | 0.500 | 67 | 100 | 0.670 | Play-offs for quarterfinals |
| 4 | Kenya | 3 | 0 | 3 | 3 | 0 | 9 | 0.000 | 31 | 135 | 0.230 | |

| Date | Time | | Score | | Set 1 | Set 2 | Set 3 | Set 4 | Set 5 | Total |
|---|---|---|---|---|---|---|---|---|---|---|
| 21 Oct | 10:30 | United States | 3–0 | Kenya | 15–2 | 15–7 | 15–4 | | | 45–13 |
| 21 Oct | 12:30 | Japan | 3–0 | Czech Republic | 15–7 | 15–9 | 15–2 | | | 45–18 |
| 22 Oct | 10:30 | United States | 3–0 | Czech Republic | 15–2 | 15–1 | 15–1 | | | 45–4 |
| 22 Oct | 12:30 | Japan | 3–0 | Kenya | 15–1 | 15–3 | 15–4 | | | 45–8 |
| 23 Oct | 10:30 | Czech Republic | 3–0 | Kenya | 15–7 | 15–3 | 15–0 | | | 45–10 |
| 23 Oct | 12:30 | United States | 3–1 | Japan | 15–8 | 6–15 | 15–7 | 15–7 | | 51–37 |

=== Final round ===
==== Play-offs for quarterfinals ====
Venue: Ginásio do Ibirapuera, São Paulo

| Date | Time | | Score | | Set 1 | Set 2 | Set 3 | Set 4 | Set 5 | Total |
|---|---|---|---|---|---|---|---|---|---|---|
| 25 Oct | | Russia | 3–1 | Czech Republic | 16–14 | 9–15 | 15–8 | 15–11 | | 55–48 |
| 25 Oct | | South Korea | 3–1 | Netherlands | 15–11 | 15–4 | 6–15 | 15–8 | | 51–38 |
| 25 Oct | | Germany | 3–1 | Azerbaijan | 15–4 | 15–3 | 8–15 | 15–9 | | 53–31 |
| 25 Oct | | Japan | 3–0 | Ukraine | 15–10 | 15–11 | 15–8 | | | 45–29 |

==== Group head matches ====
Venue: Ginásio do Ibirapuera, São Paulo

| Date | Time | | Score | | Set 1 | Set 2 | Set 3 | Set 4 | Set 5 | Total |
|---|---|---|---|---|---|---|---|---|---|---|
| 25 Oct | 16:00 | Brazil | 3–0 | China | 15–12 | 15–4 | 15–9 | | | 45–25 |
| 25 Oct | 18:00 | Cuba | 3–0 | United States | 16–14 | 15–5 | 15–12 | | | 46–31 |

==== Finals ====
Venue: Ginásio do Ibirapuera, São Paulo

Quarterfinals
28 Ocbober
Cuba | 3
Germany | 0
28 Ocbober
South Korea | 3
China | 1
28 Ocbober
Brazil | 3
Japan | 0
28 Ocbober
Russia | 3
United States | 1

Semifinals
29 Ocbober
Cuba | 3
South Korea | 0
29 Ocbober
Brazil | 3
Russia | 2

Final
30 Ocbober
Cuba | 3
Brazil | 0
3rd place
30 Ocbober
South Korea | 1
Russia | 3

5th–8th semifinals
29 Ocbober
Germany | 3
China | 1
29 Ocbober
United States | 3
Japan | 1

5th place
30 Ocbober
Germany | 3
United States | 1
7th place
30 Ocbober
China | 2
Japan | 3

===== Quarterfinals =====
| Date | Time | | Score | | Set 1 | Set 2 | Set 3 | Set 4 | Set 5 | Total |
|---|---|---|---|---|---|---|---|---|---|---|
| 28 Oct | 13:30 | Cuba | 3–0 | Germany | 15–9 | 15–5 | 15–5 | | | 45–19 |
| 28 Oct | 16:00 | Brazil | 3–0 | Japan | 15–10 | 17–15 | 15–7 | | | 47–32 |
| 28 Oct | 18:00 | South Korea | 3–1 | China | 15–5 | 4–15 | 15–5 | 15–11 | | 49–36 |
| 28 Oct | 20:00 | Russia | 3–1 | United States | 15–9 | 9–15 | 15–9 | 16–14 | | 55–47 |

===== 5th–8th semifinals =====
| Date | Time | | Score | | Set 1 | Set 2 | Set 3 | Set 4 | Set 5 | Total |
|---|---|---|---|---|---|---|---|---|---|---|
| 29 Oct | 11:30 | Germany | 3–1 | China | 13–15 | 15–13 | 15–10 | 15–13 | | 58–51 |
| 29 Oct | 13:30 | United States | 3–1 | Japan | 8–15 | 15–7 | 15–7 | 15–7 | | 53–36 |

===== Semifinals =====
| Date | Time | | Score | | Set 1 | Set 2 | Set 3 | Set 4 | Set 5 | Total |
|---|---|---|---|---|---|---|---|---|---|---|
| 29 Oct | 16:00 | Brazil | 3–2 | Russia | 15–7 | 14–16 | 12–15 | 15–8 | 15–10 | 71–56 |
| 29 Oct | 18:30 | Cuba | 3–0 | South Korea | 15–4 | 15–9 | 15–5 | | | 45–18 |

===== 7th place match =====
| Date | Time | | Score | | Set 1 | Set 2 | Set 3 | Set 4 | Set 5 | Total |
|---|---|---|---|---|---|---|---|---|---|---|
| 30 Oct | | China | 2–3 | Japan | 15–9 | 12–15 | 15–10 | 10–15 | 7–15 | 59–64 |

===== 5th place match =====
| Date | Time | | Score | | Set 1 | Set 2 | Set 3 | Set 4 | Set 5 | Total |
|---|---|---|---|---|---|---|---|---|---|---|
| 30 Oct | | Germany | 3–1 | United States | 16–14 | 15–9 | 13–15 | 15–9 | | 59–47 |

===== 3rd place match =====
| Date | Time | | Score | | Set 1 | Set 2 | Set 3 | Set 4 | Set 5 | Total |
|---|---|---|---|---|---|---|---|---|---|---|
| 30 Oct | 13:30 | South Korea | 1–3 | Russia | 16–14 | 11–15 | 6–15 | 8–15 | | 41–59 |

===== Final =====
| Date | Time | | Score | | Set 1 | Set 2 | Set 3 | Set 4 | Set 5 | Total |
|---|---|---|---|---|---|---|---|---|---|---|
| 30 Oct | 16:00 | Cuba | 3–0 | Brazil | 15–2 | 15–10 | 15–5 | | | 45–17 |

== Final standing ==
| Rank | Team |
|---|---|
| 1st place, gold medalist(s) | Cuba |
| 2nd place, silver medalist(s) | Brazil |
| 3rd place, bronze medalist(s) | Russia |
| 4 | South Korea |
| 5 | Germany |
| 6 | United States |
| 7 | Japan |
| 8 | China |
| 9 | Netherlands |
| 9 | Azerbaijan |
| 9 | Czech Republic |
| 9 | Ukraine |
| 13 | Italy |
| 13 | Romania |
| 13 | Kenya |
| 13 | Peru |

1994 Women's World champions

Cuba
2nd title

Team roster
Tania Ortíz, Marlenys Costa, Mireya Luis Hernández, Lilian Izquierdo, Idalmis Gato, Regla Bell, Regla Torres, Sonia Lescaille, Mercedes Calderón, Ana Ibis Fernández, Magaly Carvajal, Mirka Francia
Head coach
Eugenio George Lafita

== Awards ==
- Most valuable player
  (Cuba) Regla Torres
- Best scorer
  (Russia) Elena Batukhtina
- Best spiker
  (Cuba) Mireya Luis
- Best blocker
  (Cuba) Regla Torres
- Best server
  (Japan) Tomoko Yoshihara
- Best digger
  (South Korea) Park Soo-jeong
- Best setter
  (Russia) Tatiana Gratcheva
- Best receiver
  (Russia) Natalia Morozova

== Statistics leaders ==
Best scorers

| Rank | Name | Points |
|---|---|---|
| 1 | (Russia) Elena Batukhtina | 141 |
| 2 | (Brazil) Ana Moser | 135 |
| 3 | (South Korea) Chang Yoon-Hee | 122 |
| 4 | (Cuba) Mireya Luis | 108 |
| 5 | (Japan) Motoko Obayashi | 98 |
| 6 | (China) Sun Yue | 94 |
| 7 | (United States) Tara Cross-Battle | 93 |
| 8 | (Cuba) Regla Torres | 91 |
| 9 | (Russia) Tatiana Menchova | 89 |
| 10 | (Brazil) Hilma Caldeira | 86 |

Best attackers

| Rank | Name | %Eff |
|---|---|---|
| 1 | (Cuba) Mireya Luis | 43.38 |
| 2 | (Cuba) Regla Torres | 40.45 |
| 3 | (Brazil) Marcia Fu | 38.56 |
| 4 | (Russia) Tatiana Menchova | 36.45 |
| 5 | (United States) Tara Cross-Battle | 35.30 |

Best blockers

| Rank | Name | Avg |
|---|---|---|
| 1 | (Cuba) Regla Torres | 1.84 |
| 2 | (Cuba) Magalys Carvajal | 1.53 |
| 3 | (Brazil) Ana Paula Connelly | 1.12 |
| 4 | (Russia) Valentina Oguienko | 1.02 |
| 5 | (South Korea) Chang So-Yun | 0.89 |

Best servers

| Rank | Name | Avg |
|---|---|---|
| 1 | (Japan) Tomoko Yoshihara | 0.43 |
| 2 | (Brazil) Ana Moser | 0.41 |
| 3 | (China) Cui Yongmei | 0.37 |
| 4 | (Russia) Elena Batukhtina | 0.35 |
| 5 | (Cuba) Marlenis Costa | 0.34 |

Best diggers

| Rank | Name | Avg |
|---|---|---|
| 1 | (South Korea) Park Soo-jeong | 4.39 |
| 2 | (Japan) Asako Tajimi | 3.78 |
| 3 | (China) Lai Yawen | 3.42 |
| 4 | (Japan) Motoko Obayashi | 3.11 |
| 5 | (Brazil) Marcia Fu | 2.94 |

Best setters

| Rank | Name | Avg |
|---|---|---|
| 1 | (Brazil) Fernanda Venturini | 8.85 |
| 2 | (Russia) Tatiana Gratcheva | 7.66 |
| 3 | (Japan) Aki Nagatomi | 7.22 |
| 4 | (Cuba) Marlenis Costa | 6.18 |
| 5 | (China) He Qi | 5.79 |

Best receivers

| Rank | Name | %Succ |
|---|---|---|
| 1 | (Cuba) Regla Torres | 72.18 |
| 2 | (Brazil) Ana Flavia Sanglard | 68.45 |
| 3 | (Japan) Tomoko Yoshihara | 67.94 |
| 4 | (Japan) Motoko Obayashi | 63.21 |
| 5 | (Russia) Elena Batukhtina | 60.35 |
