= Volleyball at the 1996 Summer Olympics – Women's tournament =

Women's volleyball at the Games of the XXVI Olympiad
- Venue: University of Georgia Coliseum; Omni Coliseum
- Date: 20 July – 3 August
- Competitors: 144 from 12 nations

Medalists
1st place, gold medalist(s)		Cuba (2nd title)
2nd place, silver medalist(s)		China
3rd place, bronze medalist(s)		Brazil

The 1996 women's Olympic volleyball tournament was the ninth edition of the event, organised by the world's governing body, the FIVB in conjunction with the International Olympic Committee. It was held from 20 July to 3 August 1996 at the Stegeman Coliseum of The University of Georgia in Athens, Georgia and at the Omni Coliseum in Atlanta, Georgia. 12 teams competed, up from eight in 1992.

== Qualification ==
Qualifiers	Date	Host	Vacancies	Qualified
Host Country	18 September 1990	(Japan) Tokyo	1	United States
1995 Women's World Cup	3–17 November 1995	Japan	3	Cuba
1995 Women's World Cup	3–17 November 1995	Japan	3	Brazil
1995 Women's World Cup	3–17 November 1995	Japan	3	China
European Qualification			1	Germany
North American Qualification			1	Canada
South American Qualification			1	Peru
Asian Qualification			1	South Korea
African Qualification			1	Russia
1996 Olympic Qualification Tournament	26 May −2 June 1996	Tokyo, Japan	3	Netherlands
1996 Olympic Qualification Tournament	26 May −2 June 1996	Tokyo, Japan	3	Japan
1996 Olympic Qualification Tournament	26 May −2 June 1996	Tokyo, Japan	3	Ukraine
Total			12	

== Format ==
In 1991, the International Olympic Committee alongside the FIVB decided to increase the number of countries participating in the women's volleyball tournament at the Summer Olympic Games from 8 to 12 and thus equalize the number of athletes in the two tournaments.As the men's event, the tournament was played in two different stages. In the Preliminary round (first stage), the twelve participants were divided into two pools of six teams. A single round-robin format was played within each pool to determine the teams position in the pool. The four highest ranked teams in each pool advanced to the Final round (second stage) and the two lowest ranked teams took no further participation (with pool places 5th and 6th being ranked in the final standings as joined 9th ad 11th, respectively).

The Final round was played in a single elimination format, with placement matches determining the top eight positions. Starting at the quarterfinals, winners advanced to the semifinals while losers advanced to the placement matches (5th–8th semifinal).

== Pools composition ==
Teams were seeded following the Serpentine system according to their ranking as of January 1996.

Pool A	Pool B
United States (hosts)	Cuba (1st)
Japan (4th)	Brazil (2nd)
China (5th)	Russia (7th)
South Korea (6th)	Germany (8th)
Netherlands	Peru
Ukraine	Canada

== Venues ==
- University of Georgia Coliseum, Athens, United States
- Omni Coliseum, Atlanta, United States

== Preliminary round ==
=== Group A ===
Pos	Team	Pld	W	L	Pts	SW	SL	SR	SPW	SPL	SPR	Qualification
1	China	5	5	0	10	15	3	5.000	256	181	1.414	Quarterfinals
2	United States	5	4	1	9	13	5	2.600	241	198	1.217	Quarterfinals
3	Netherlands	5	3	2	8	10	7	1.429	211	179	1.179	Quarterfinals
4	South Korea	5	2	3	7	10	9	1.111	249	222	1.122	Quarterfinals
5	Japan	5	1	4	6	3	12	0.250	158	199	0.794	
6	Ukraine	5	0	5	5	0	15	0.000	89	225	0.396	

20 July 1996	Netherlands	0–3	China
20 July 1996	(10–15 ,5–15, 7–15); Report

20 July 1996	Japan	0–3	South Korea
20 July 1996	(10–15, 12–15, 10–15); Report

20 July 1996	United States	3–0	Ukraine
20 July 1996	(15–8, 15–5, 15–11); Report

22 July 1996	China	3–2	South Korea
22 July 1996	(17–16, 16–14, 2–15, 13–15, 15–13); Report

22 July 1996	Ukraine	0–3	Japan
22 July 1996	(9–15, 5–15, 4–15); Report

22 July 1996	Netherlands	1–3	United States
22 July 1996	(15–12, 10–15, 15–17, 7–15); Report

24 July 1996	Japan	0–3	Netherlands
24 July 1996	(3–15, 10–15, 3–15); Report

24 July 1996	United States	1–3	China
24 July 1996	(8–15, 2–15, 15–12, 12–15); Report

24 July 1996	South Korea	3–0	Ukraine
24 July 1996	(15–3, 15–10, 15–7); Report

26 July 1996	Netherlands	3–1	South Korea
26 July 1996	(15–11, 15–12, 7–15, 15–8); Report

26 July 1996	China	3–0	Ukraine
26 July 1996	(15–4, 15–4, 15–6); Report

26 July 1996	United States	3–0	Japan
26 July 1996	(15–11 ,15–7, 15–12); Report

28 July 1996	Japan	0–3	China
28 July 1996	(14–16, 11–15, 10–15); Report

28 July 1996	South Korea	1–3	United States
28 July 1996	(15–10, 13–15, 9–15, 3–15); Report

28 July 1996	Ukraine	0–3	Netherlands
28 July 1996	(3–15, 5–15, 5–15); Report

=== Group B ===
Pos	Team	Pld	W	L	Pts	SW	SL	SR	SPW	SPL	SPR	Qualification
1	Brazil	5	5	0	10	15	1	15.000	238	121	1.967	Quarterfinals
2	Russia	5	4	1	9	12	4	3.000	217	140	1.550	Quarterfinals
3	Cuba	5	3	2	8	10	6	1.667	196	156	1.256	Quarterfinals
4	Germany	5	2	3	7	7	9	0.778	163	191	0.853	Quarterfinals
5	Canada	5	1	4	6	3	14	0.214	156	239	0.653	
6	Peru	5	0	5	5	2	15	0.133	129	252	0.512	

20 July 1996	Russia	3–0	Germany
20 July 1996	(15–5 ,15–10, 15–7); Report

20 July 1996	Canada	0–3	Cuba
20 July 1996	(8–15, 8–15, 5–15); Report

20 July 1996	Brazil	3–0	Peru
20 July 1996	(15–7, 15–1, 15–5); Report

22 July 1996	Russia	3–0	Canada
22 July 1996	(15–1, 15–7, 15–9); Report

22 July 1996	Germany	3–0	Peru
22 July 1996	(15–11, 15–6, 15–3); Report

22 July 1996	Cuba	0–3	Brazil
22 July 1996	(11–15, 10–15, 4–15); Report

24 July 1996	Canada	0–3	Germany
24 July 1996	(5–15, 12–15, 6–15); Report

24 July 1996	Brazil	3–0	Russia
24 July 1996	(15–3, 15–11, 15–13); Report

24 July 1996	Peru	0–3	Cuba
24 July 1996	(2–15, 5–15, 10–15); Report

26 July 1996	Russia	3–0	Peru
26 July 1996	(15–11, 15–8, 15–1); Report

26 July 1996	Germany	0–3	Cuba
26 July 1996	(6–15, 8–15, 4–15); Report

26 July 1996	Canada	0–3	Brazil
26 July 1996	(6–15, 6–15, 11–15); Report

28 July 1996	Brazil	3–1	Germany
28 July 1996	(15–4, 13–15, 15–6, 15–8); Report

28 July 1996	Cuba	1–3	Russia
28 July 1996	(15–10, 6–15, 7–15, 8–15); Report

28 July 1996	Peru	2–3	Canada
28 July 1996	(17–16, 6–15, 15–11, 9–15, 12–15); Report

== Final round ==
Quarterfinals
30 July
China	3
Germany	0
30 July
Netherlands	1
Russia	3
30 July
United States	0
Cuba	3
30 July
South Korea	0
Brazil	3

Semifinals
1 August
China	3
Russia	1
1 August
Cuba	3
Brazil	2

Final
3 August
China	1
Cuba	3
Third place
3 August
Russia	2
Brazil	3

5–8th place
31 July
Germany	2
Netherlands	3
31 July
United States	0
South Korea	3

5th place
1 August
Netherlands	3
South Korea	0
7th place
1 August
Germany	1
United States	3

=== Quarterfinals ===
30 July 1996	China	3–0	Germany
30 July 1996	(15–12 ,15–8 ,15–8); Report

30 July 1996	Netherlands	1–3	Russia
30 July 1996	(15–10, 7–15, 9–15, 10–15); Report

30 July 1996	United States	0–3	Cuba
30 July 1996	(1–15, 10–15, 12–15); Report

30 July 1996	South Korea	0–3	Brazil
30 July 1996	(4–15, 2–15, 10–15); Report

=== 5th–8th places ===
==== Semifinals ====
31 July 1996	Germany	2–3	Netherlands
31 July 1996	(12–15, 15–9, 15–13, 9–15, 10–15); Report

31 July 1996	United States	0–3	South Korea
31 July 1996	(12–15, 5–15, 11–15); Report

==== 7th place match ====
1 August 1996	Germany	1–3	United States
1 August 1996	(16–17, 6–15, 15–5, 6–15); Report

==== 5th place match ====
1 August 1996	Netherlands	3–0	South Korea
1 August 1996	(15–9 ,15–9, 15–13); Report

=== 1st–4th places ===
==== Semifinals ====
1 August 1996	China	3–1	Russia
1 August 1996	(12–15, 15–5, 15–8, 15–12); Report

1 August 1996	Cuba	3–2	Brazil
1 August 1996	(5–15, 15–8, 10–15, 15–13, 15–12); Report

==== Bronze medal match ====
3 August 1996	Russia	2–3	Brazil
3 August 1996	(13–15, 15–4, 14–16, 15–8, 13–15); Report

==== Gold medal match ====
3 August 1996	China	1–3	Cuba
3 August 1996	(16–14, 12–15, 16–17, 6–15); Report

== Final standings ==
Place	Team
1st place, gold medalist(s)	Cuba
2nd place, silver medalist(s)	China
3rd place, bronze medalist(s)	Brazil
4	Russia
5	Netherlands
6	South Korea
7	United States
8	Germany
9	Canada
9	Japan
11	Peru
11	Ukraine

1996 Women's Olympic champions

Cuba
2nd title

12-woman roster
Yumilka Ruiz, Marlenis Costa, Mireya Luis (c), Lilia Izquierdo, Idalmis Gato, Raisa O'Farril, Regla Bell, Regla Torres, Taismary Agüero, Ana Fernández, Magalys Carvajal, Mirka Francia
Head coach
Eugenio George

== Medalists ==
Gold	Silver	Bronze
Cuba Yumilka Ruiz; Marlenis Costa; Mireya Luis (c); Lilia Izquierdo; Idalmis Gato; Raisa O'Farril; Regla Bell; Regla Torres; Taismary Agüero; Ana Fernández; Magalys Carvajal; Mirka Francia Head coach: Eugenio George	China Lai Yawen (c); Li Yan; Cui Yongmei; Zhu Yunying; Wu Yongmei; Wang Yi; He Qi; Pan Wenli; Liu Xiaoning; Wang Ziling; Sun Yue; Wang Lina Head coach: Lang Ping	Brazil Ana Moser; Ana Ida Alvares; Ana Paula Connelly; Leila Barros; Hilma Caldeira; Virna Dias; Márcia Cunha; Ericleia Bodziak; Ana Flávia Sanglard; Fernanda Venturini; Hélia Souza; Sandra Suruagy Head coach: Bernardinho

== Individual awards ==
- Most valuable player
  Cintha Boersma (NED)
- Best spiker
  Cui Yongmei (CHN)
- Best blocker
  Magaly Carvajal (CUB)
- Best server
  Henriëtte Weersing (NED)
- Best digger
  Ikumi Narita (JPN)
- Best setter
  Riëtte Fledderus (NED)
- Best receiver
  Lai Yawen (CHN)

== Statistics leaders ==
Best scorers

Rank	Name	Total Points	Spike	Block	Serve
1	(Russia) Artamonova, Evguenia	191	168	14	9
2	(China) Sun Yue	171	155	12	4
3	(China) Li Yan	170	142	23	5
4	(United States) Cross-Battle, Tara	162	150	8	4
5	(Cuba) Luis, Mireya	160	143	7	6
6	(Cuba) Carvajal, Magalys	150	120	25	5
7	(Brazil) Cunha, Marcia Fu	139	118	17	4
8	(Brazil) Moser, Ana	137	113	15	9
9	(South Korea) Chung, Sun-Hye	134	116	14	4
10	(Netherlands) Weersing, Henriette	131	115	11	5

Best attackers

Rank	Name	Total kills	Total Attempts	Efficiency%
1	(China) CUI, Yong Mei	84	223	37.71%
2	(Russia) ARTAMONOVA, Evguenia	168	459	36.57%
3	(Brazil) CUNHA, Marcia Fu	118	341	34.59%
4	(China) SUN, Yue	155	458	33.81%
5	(Brazil) RODRIGUEZ, Ana Paula	95	292	33.57%

Best blockers

Rank	Name	Total blocks	Sets Played	Avg per set
1	(Cuba) CARVAJAL, Magalys	25	16	1.31
2	(Brazil) RODRIGUEZ, Ana Paula	22	15	1.15
3	(China) LI, Yan	23	21	1.09
4	(Canada) VON SASS, Katrina	17	14	1.02
5	(China) LAI, Yawen	21	21	1.00

Best servers

Rank	Name	Total aces	Sets Played	Avg per set
1	(Brazil) MOSER, Ana	9	18	0.47
2	(Russia) ARTAMONOVA, Evguenia	9	20	0.45
3	(Netherlands) VISSER, Ingrid	8	20	0.39
4	(Canada) SOUCY, Brigittie	6	17	0.35
5	(Japan) OBAYASHI, Motoko	5	15	0.33

Best diggers

Rank	Name	Total digs	Attempts	Avg per set
1	(Japan) NARITA, Ikumi	78	199	2.47
2	(China) LAI, Yawen	72	208	2.31
3	(Russia) BATUKHTINA, Elena	64	188	2.11
4	(Cuba) LUIS, Mireya	59	193	1,98
5	(Brazil) CUNHA, Marcia Fu	54	177	1.79

Best setters

Rank	Name	Running Sets	Attempts	Avg per set
1	(Brazil) VENTURINI, Fernanda	306	704	14.54
2	(Netherlands) FLEDDERUS, Riette	279	651	11.08
3	(Russia) NIKULINA, Marina	221	621	9.97
4	(United States) ZETTURLAND, Yoko	201	509	8.77
5	(China) HE, Qi	196	603	7.45
6	(Cuba) COSTA, Marleny	176	407	6.74
7	(Japan) NAGATOMI, Aki	144	563	5.51
8	(Germany) PIANKA, Ines	121	583	4.13
9	(Cuba) O’FARILL, Raisa	98	332	3.87
10	(South Korea) SHIN, Young-Choul	96	521	3.11

Best receivers

Rank	Name	Excellent	Succ%
1	(China) LAI, Yawen	179	77.45
2	(Russia) BATUKHTINA, Elena	146	74.29
3	(Brazil) DIAS, Virna	135	70.54
4	(Japan) YOSHIHARA, Tomoko	128	69.23
5	(China) WANG Yi	119	67.49
