= Taismary Agüero =

Italian volleyball player (born 1977)

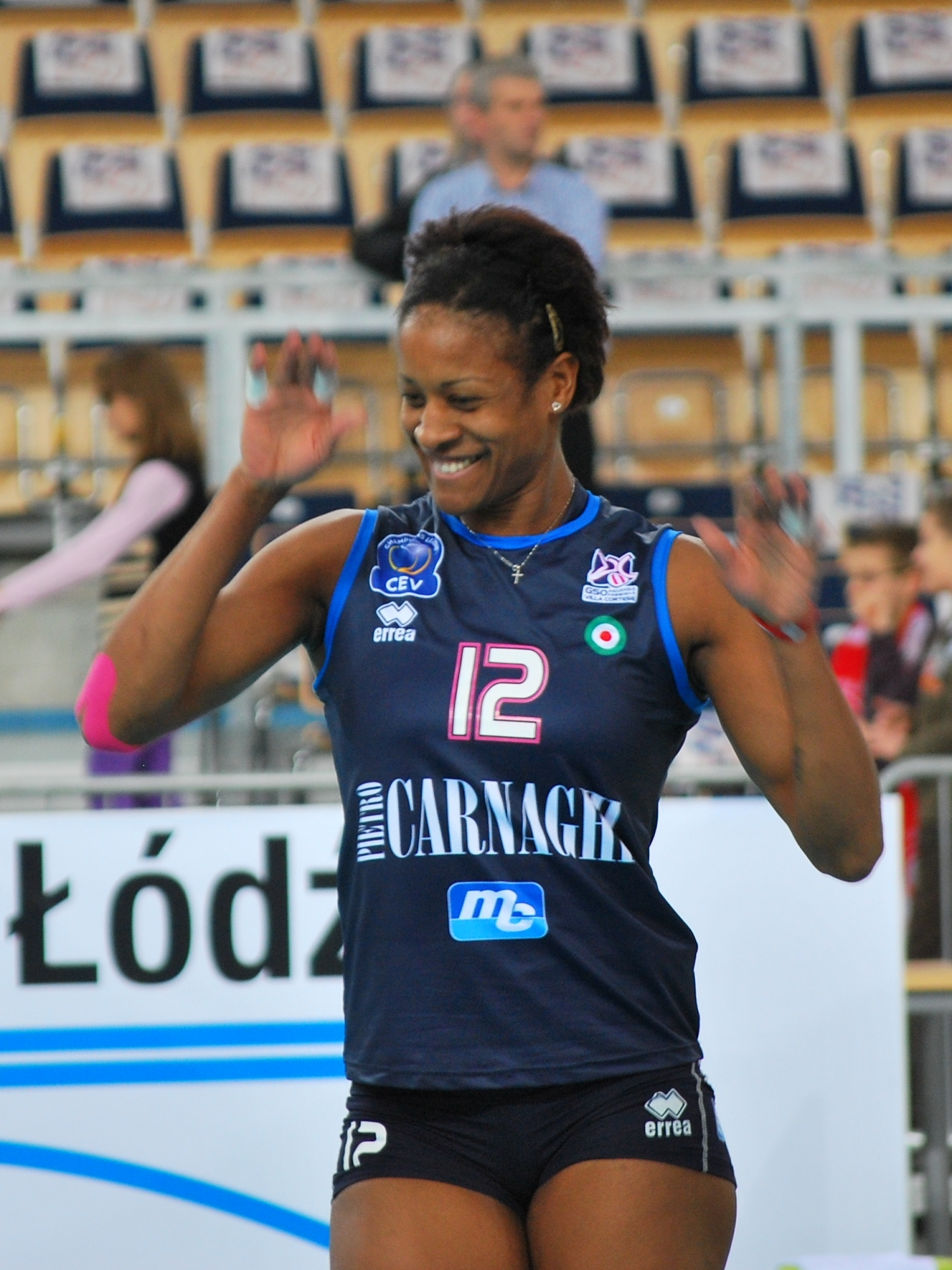
- Agüero with Villa Cortese in 2010

Personal information
- Full name: Taismary Agüero Leiva Botteghi
- Nicknames: Tai, Fenomeno, Extraterrestre
- Nationality: Italian
- Born: 5 March 1977 (age 49) Yaguajay, Cuba
- Height: 1.77 m (5 ft 10 in)
- Weight: 69 kg (152 lb)
- Spike: 322 cm (127 in)
- Block: 300 cm (118 in)

Volleyball information
- Position: Wing spiker
- Current club: Emilbronzo 2000 Montale
- Number: 12

National team
- Years: Team
- 1993–2001: Cuba
- 2007–2014: Italy
Medal record
Women's volleyball
Representing Cuba
Olympic Games
Gold medal – first place	1996 Atlanta	Team
Gold medal – first place	2000 Sydney	Team
World Championship
Gold medal – first place	1998 Japan	Team
FIVB World Cup
Gold medal – first place	1995 Japan	Team
Gold medal – first place	1999 Japan	Team
FIVB World Grand Prix
Gold medal – first place	2000 Quezon City
Silver medal – second place	1996 Shanghai
Silver medal – second place	1997 Kobe
Bronze medal – third place	1995 Shanghai
Bronze medal – third place	1998 Hong Kong
World Grand Champions Cup
Silver medal – second place	1997 Japan
Pan American Games
Silver medal – second place	1999 Winnipeg	Team
Central American and Caribbean Games
Gold medal – first place	1993 Ponce	Team
Representing Italy
FIVB World Cup
Gold medal – first place	2007 Japan
FIVB World Grand Prix
Bronze medal – third place	2007 Ningbo
Bronze medal – third place	2008 Yokohama
European Championship
Gold medal – first place	2007 Belgium/Luxembourg
Gold medal – first place	2009 Poland
Mediterranean Games
Gold medal – first place	2009 Pescara	Team

Taismary Agüero Leiva (born 5 March 1977) is a Cuban-born Italian volleyball player. She is the only player to have represented two women's national volleyball teams that won major titles (1995 FIVB World Cup, 1996 Atlanta Olympic Games, 1998 FIVB World Championship, 1999 FIVB World Cup and 2000 Sydney Olympic Games for Cuba; 2007 FIVB World Cup for Italy).

In 2021, Agüero was inducted into the International Volleyball Hall of Fame.

== Career ==
=== Cuban national team ===
Agüero was born in Yaguajay in the province of Sancti Spiritus, where she began to play volleyball when she was eight years old. Two years later, she entered in the Cerro Pelado Training Center in Havana. In the 1993 junior championship, she was named MVP, best setter, and best server. After the 1993 junior championship, she joined the Cuban national team.

Agüero won the gold medal with the national team at the 1996 Summer Olympics in Atlanta. In 1998, together with Mireya Luis, Regla Bell, Ana Ibis Fernandez, and Mirka Francia, Agüero won the 1998 FIVB World Championship in Japan. She won her second Olympic gold medal with the Cuban national team at the 2000 Summer Olympics in Sydney.

In the summer of 2001, Agüero left the Cuban national team during a tournament in Switzerland and applied for political asylum in Italy. She joined Pallavolo Sirio Perugia, an Italian volleyball club that she had played for during the 1998–99 and 1999–00 seasons.

=== Italian national team ===
At the end of 2006, Agüero became an Italian citizen after marrying Alessio Botteghi. In the summer of 2007, she joined the Italian national team. Playing for Italy, Agüero won the 2007 European Volleyball Championship, where she was declared MVP. She also was selected as the Best Spiker and Best Scorer at the 2007 FIVB World Grand Prix.

Agüero won the gold medal at the 2009 European Volleyball Championship.

== Club volleyball ==
Agüero played for two seasons for Sirio Perugia from 1998 to 2000. She then played again for Sirio from 2001 to 2005. From 2005 to 2007, she played for Asystel Novara. In 2007–08, she played for Türk Telekom club in Ankara.

Since 2009, Agüero has played for numerous Italian clubs. For the 2009–10 season, she played for Carnaghi Villa Cortese. In 2013–14, Agüero played for the Pomi Casalmaggiore. Since 2018, Agüero has played for Emilbronzo 2000 Montale.

Agüero played opposite later in her career, whereas with the Cuban national team she was a setter and outside hitter.

== Clubs ==
- (Italy) Sirio Perugia (1998–2005)
- (Italy) Asystel Novara (2005–2007)
- (Turkey) Türk Telekom Ankara (2007–2009)
- (Italy) Carnaghi Villa Cortese (2009–2011)
- (Italy) Universal Volley Modena (2011–2013)
- (Italy) Pomi Casalmaggiore (2013-2014)
- (Italy) Volley 2002 Forlì (2014–2016)
- (Italy) Canovi Sassuolo (2016-2018)
- (Italy) Emilbronzo 2000 Montale (2018-)

== Awards ==
=== Individuals ===
- 1999 FIVB World Cup "Most Valuable Player"
- 1999 FIVB World Cup "Best Server"
- 2007 FIVB World Grand Prix "Best Spiker"
- 2007 FIVB World Grand Prix "Best Scorer"
- 2007 European Championship "Most Valuable Player"

Awards
Preceded by (Poland) Dorota Świeniewicz	Most Valuable Player of European Championship; 2007	Succeeded by (Netherlands) Manon Flier
Preceded by (Brazil) Fabiana Claudino	Best Spiker of FIVB World Grand Prix; 2007	Succeeded by (Cuba) Daimí Ramírez
Preceded by (Russia) Ekaterina Gamova	Best Scorer of FIVB World Grand Prix; 2007	Succeeded by (Japan) Megumi Kurihara
