= Raisa O'Farrill Bolanos =

Cuban volleyball player (1972–2023)

Raisa O'Farrill Bolaños

Personal information
- Born: 17 April 1972; Villa Clara, Cuba
- Died: 30 May 2023 (aged 51); Havana, Cuba
- Height: 1.83 m (6 ft 0 in)

Volleyball information
- Number: 6

Career
Years	Teams
1988–2000	Villa Clara

National team
1992–2000	Cuba
Honours
Women's volleyball
Representing Cuba
Olympic Games
Gold medal – first place	1992 Barcelona	Team
Gold medal – first place	1996 Atlanta	Team
World Championship
Gold medal – first place	1994 Brazil	Team
FIVB World Cup
Gold medal – first place	1995 Japan	Team
FIVB World Grand Prix
Gold medal – first place	1993 Hong Kong
Silver medal – second place	1994 Shanghai
Silver medal – second place	1996 Shanghai
Bronze medal – third place	1995 Shanghai
Central American and Caribbean Games
Gold medal – first place	1993 Ponce	Team

Raisa O'Farrill Bolaños (17 April 1972 – 30 May 2023), more commonly known as Raisa O'Farrill, was a Cuban female volleyball player and two-time Olympian. She helped the Cuban women's national volleyball team win gold medals at the 1992 Summer Olympics in Barcelona and the 1996 Summer Olympics in Atlanta.

O'Farrill also won a gold medal at the 1994 FIVB World Championship in Brazil. On club level she played with Villa Clara.

== Teaching ==
After her retirement from volleyball, O'Farill was a professor at the Manuel Fajardo University of Cuban Sports.

== Death ==
O'Farrill died on 30 May 2023, at the age of 51, after a battle with cancer.

== Clubs ==
- Villa Clara (1988–2000)
