= 2000 FIVB Volleyball World Grand Prix =

Volleyball competition

2000 FIVB World Grand Prix
Tournament details
- Host country: Philippines
- Dates: 24–27 August
- Teams: 8
- Venue: 1 (in 1 host city)

Final positions
- Champions: Cuba (2nd title)

Tournament awards
- MVP: (Russia) Liubov Chachkova-Sokolova

The 2000 FIVB World Grand Prix was the eighth women's volleyball tournament of its kind. It was held over four weeks in three countries and six cities throughout Asia: Hong Kong, Thailand, PR China, Chinese Taipei and Malaysia, cumulating with the final round at the PhilSports Arena in Pasig City, Philippines, from 24 to 27 August 2000.

== Preliminary round ==
=== Ranking ===
The best four teams from the overall ranking are qualified for the final round.

Pos	Team	Pld	W	L	Pts	SW	SL	SR	SPW	SPL	SPR	Qualification
1	Cuba	9	9	0	18	27	4	6.750	746	607	1.229	Final round
2	Russia	9	8	1	17	24	10	2.400	770	675	1.141	Final round
3	Brazil	9	7	2	16	23	8	2.875	745	658	1.132	Final round
4	China	9	4	5	13	18	17	1.059	777	756	1.028	Final round
5	United States	9	4	5	13	15	19	0.789	745	775	0.961	
6	South Korea	9	3	6	12	15	20	0.750	753	772	0.975	
7	Italy	9	1	8	10	6	26	0.231	631	753	0.838	
8	Japan	9	0	9	9	3	27	0.111	574	745	0.770	

=== First round ===
==== Group A ====
- Venue: Macau

Date		Score		Set 1	Set 2	Set 3	Set 4	Set 5	Total
4 Ago	Brazil	3–0	United States	25–23	25–16	25–15			75–54
4 Ago	China	3–0	Japan	25–14	25–20	25–16			75–50
5 Ago	Brazil	3–0	Japan	37–35	25–18	25–21			87–74
5 Ago	China	3–1	United States	25–27	25–15	25–16	25–21		100–79
6 Ago	United States	3–0	Japan	25–18	25–17	26–24			76–59
6 Ago	Brazil	3–2	China	25–22	27–25	23–25	18–25	16–14	109–111

==== Group B ====
- Venue: Yala, Thailand

Date		Score		Set 1	Set 2	Set 3	Set 4	Set 5	Total
4 Ago	Cuba	3–2	Italy	25–18	16–25	25–21	23–25	15–12	104–101
4 Ago	Russia	3–2	South Korea	20–25	25–22	25–11	25–27	15–10	110–95
5 Ago	Russia	3–0	Italy	25–17	25–23	25–21			75–61
5 Ago	Cuba	3–0	South Korea	25–20	25–17	25–17			75–54
6 Ago	Cuba	3–0	Russia	25–18	25–22	25–16			75–56
6 Ago	South Korea	3–0	Italy	25–21	25–18	25–18			75–57

=== Second round ===
==== Group C ====
- Venue: Kaohsiung, Taiwan

Date		Score		Set 1	Set 2	Set 3	Set 4	Set 5	Total
11 Ago	Brazil	3–0	Japan	25–19	25–19	25–20			76–58
11 Ago	Russia	3–0	Italy	25–15	25–18	25–16			75–49
12 Ago	Russia	3–0	Japan	25–16	25–11	25–20			75–47
12 Ago	Brazil	3–0	Italy	25–17	25–23	25–18			75–58
13 Ago	Italy	3–2	Japan	19–25	24–26	25–22	25–15	17–15	110–103
13 Ago	Russia	3–0	Brazil	25–23	25–21	25–21			75–65

==== Group D ====
- Venue: Kuala Lumpur, Malaysia

Date		Score		Set 1	Set 2	Set 3	Set 4	Set 5	Total
11 Ago	China	3–1	United States	22–25	25–21	25–22	25–22		97–90
11 Ago	Cuba	3–1	South Korea	19–25	25–19	25–17	25–23		94–84
12 Ago	Cuba	3–0	United States	25–23	25–23	25–16			75–62
12 Ago	South Korea	3–2	China	21–25	25–15	25–21	23–25	15–10	109–96
13 Ago	United States	3–1	South Korea	20–25	25–23	25–22	25–21		95–91
13 Ago	Cuba	3–0	China	25–22	25–19	25–18			75–59

=== Third round ===
==== Group E ====
- Venue: Yuxi, China

Date		Score		Set 1	Set 2	Set 3	Set 4	Set 5	Total
18 Ago	United States	3–2	China	26–28	25–20	22–25	25–18	15–12	113–103
18 Ago	Cuba	3–0	Japan	25–13	25–18	25–19			75–50
19 Ago	China	3–0	Japan	25–15	25–18	25–23			75–56
19 Ago	Cuba	3–1	United States	25–15	25–23	23–25	25–17		98–80
20 Ago	Cuba	3–0	China	25–20	25–20	25–21			75–61
20 Ago	United States	3–1	Japan	21–25	25–14	25–17	25–21		96–77

==== Group F ====
- Venue: Quezon City, Philippines

Date		Score		Set 1	Set 2	Set 3	Set 4	Set 5	Total
18 Ago	Brazil	3–0	Italy	25–14	25–20	25–21			75–55
18 Ago	Russia	3–2	South Korea	25–21	19–25	18–25	25–19	15–13	102–103
19 Ago	Russia	3–1	Italy	25–18	20–25	25–14	25–19		95–76
19 Ago	Brazil	3–0	South Korea	25–17	25–22	29–27			79–66
20 Ago	South Korea	3–0	Italy	25–23	25–17	26–24			76–64
20 Ago	Russia	3–2	Brazil	25–18	18–25	20–25	25–19	19–17	107–104

== Final round ==
- Venue: Pasig City, Philippines

=== 5th–8th place ===
5th–8th semifinals
24 August
United States	3
Japan	0
24 August
Italy	1
South Korea	3

5th place
25 August
United States	0
South Korea	3
7th place
25 August
Japan	1
Italy	3

==== 5th–8th semifinals ====
Date		Score		Set 1	Set 2	Set 3	Set 4	Set 5	Total
24 Ago	United States	3–0	Japan	27–25	25–22	25–23			77–70
24 Ago	Italy	1–3	South Korea	20–25	26–24	18–25	17–25		81–99

==== 7th place match ====
Date		Score		Set 1	Set 2	Set 3	Set 4	Set 5	Total
25 Ago	Japan	1–3	Italy	25–19	21–25	11–25	19–25		76–94

==== 5th place match ====
Date		Score		Set 1	Set 2	Set 3	Set 4	Set 5	Total
25 Ago	United States	0–3	South Korea	23–25	23–25	19–25			65–75

=== Final four ===
Semifinals
26 August
Cuba	3
China	1
26 August
Brazil	0
Russia	3

Final
27 August
Cuba	3
Russia	1
3rd place match
27 August
China	1
Brazil	3

==== Semifinals ====
Date		Score		Set 1	Set 2	Set 3	Set 4	Set 5	Total
26 Ago	Cuba	3–1	China	25–19	25–21	16–25	35–33		101–98
26 Ago	Brazil	0–3	Russia	20–25	23–25	22–25			65–75

==== 3rd place match ====
Date		Score		Set 1	Set 2	Set 3	Set 4	Set 5	Total
27 Ago	China	1–3	Brazil	25–12	13–25	19–25	18–25		75–87

==== Final ====
Date		Score		Set 1	Set 2	Set 3	Set 4	Set 5	Total
27 Ago	Cuba	3–1	Russia	21–25	25–15	25–23	25–21		96–84

== Final standings ==
Place	Team
1st place, gold medalist(s)	Cuba
2nd place, silver medalist(s)	Russia
3rd place, bronze medalist(s)	Brazil
4	China
5	South Korea
6	United States
7	Italy
8	Japan

2000 FIVB World Grand Prix winners

Cuba
Second title

Team roster
Yumilka Ruiz, Marlenis Costa, Mireya Luis, Raisa O'Farrill Bolanos, Regla Bell, Indira Mestre, Regla Torres, Taismary Aguero, Ana Fernández, Mirka Francia, Marta Sánchez and Zoila Barros.
Head coach
Luis Calderon

== Individual awards ==
- Most valuable player:
  - Lyubov Sokolova (RUS)
- Best scorer:
  - Barbara Jelic (CRO)
- Best spiker:
  - Valle Ana Fernandez (CUB)
- Best blocker:
  - Ekaterina Gamova (RUS)
- Best server:
  - Érika Coimbra (BRA)
- Best setter:
  - Hélia Souza (BRA)
- Best receiver:
  - Stacy Sykora (USA)
- Best libero:
  - Li Yan (CHN)

== Dream Team ==
- Setter:
  - Robyn Ah Mow (USA)
- Middle Blockers:
  - Danielle Scott (USA)
  - Regla Torres (CUB)
- Outside hitters:
  - Barbara Jelic (CRO)
  - Yevgeniya Artamonova (RUS)
- Opposite Spiker:
  - Leila Barros (BRA)
