= Magaly Carvajal =

Cuban volleyball player

Personal information
- Full name: Magalys Esther Carvajal Rivera
- Nationality: Cuban/Spanish/American
- Born: 18 December 1968 (age 57); Havana, Cuba
- Height: 1.90 m (6 ft 3 in)

Volleyball information
- Position: Middle blocker
- Number: 15 (Cuban national team)

National team
1985–1996	Cuba
2001–2002	Spain
Honours
Women's volleyball
Representing Cuba
Olympic Games
Gold medal – first place	1992 Barcelona	Team
Gold medal – first place	1996 Atlanta	Team
World Championship
Gold medal – first place	1994 Brazil	Team
Silver medal – second place	1986 Czechoslovakia	Team
FIVB World Cup
Gold medal – first place	1989 Japan
Gold medal – first place	1991 Japan
Gold medal – first place	1995 Japan	Team
FIVB World Grand Prix
Gold medal – first place	1993 Hong Kong
Silver medal – second place	1994 Shanghai
Silver medal – second place	1996 Shanghai
Bronze medal – third place	1995 Shanghai
World Grand Champions Cup
Gold medal – first place	1993 Japan
Pan American Games
Gold medal – first place	1987 Indianapolis	Team
Gold medal – first place	1991 Havana	Team
Gold medal – first place	1995 Mar del Plata	Team

Magalys Carvajal Rivera (born 18 December 1968), more commonly known as Magaly Carvajal, is a retired Cuban volleyball player and two-time Olympian. As a middle blocker, she led Cuba to gold medals in the 1992 Summer Olympics in Barcelona and 1996 Summer Olympics in Atlanta.

Carvajal also helped Cuba win the silver medal in the 1986 FIVB World Championship in Czechoslovakia and the gold medal in the 1994 FIVB World Championship in Brazil. Additionally, she won gold medals in the 1989, 1991, and 1995 FIVB World Cups in Japan.

Carvajal was a starter at just 17 years of age with the Cuban team in the 1987 Pan American Games in Indianapolis, where she won a gold medal. She also participated in the 1991 Pan American Games in Havana and the 1995 Pan American Games in Mar del Plata, winning a gold medal in each event. After winning her second Olympic gold medal in 1996, Carvajal announced her retirement from the Cuban team.

Carvajal is widely regarded as one of the greatest middle blockers of all time, standing at 1.90 meters (6'3") tall. She was known for shutting down the greatest hitters in the world. Her vertical jump reach of 3.35 meters (11') was rivaled only by teammate Mireya Luis. Her stare was known to intimidate players at the net, and has been called by many of her peers "the look of death". Carvajal was also an effective hitter.

In 2011, Carvajal was inducted into the International Volleyball Hall of Fame.

== Spanish national team ==
Carvajal became a naturalized citizen of Spain in 1998, and played on the Spanish women's national volleyball team from 2001 to 2002.

== Club volleyball ==
Carvajal had a successful transition to the Spanish volleyball league, becoming a dominant player. In 2003–04, she led Spar Tenerife Marichal to the European Champions League title.

== Personal life ==
In June 2020, Carvajal announced on Facebook that she became a United States citizen.
