= Leila Barros =

Brazilian volleyball player

- Official portrait

Senator for the Federal District
- Incumbent
- Assumed office 1 February 2019

Senate PSB Leader
- In office 12 January 2021 – 19 August 2021
- Preceded by: Veneziano Vital do Rêgo

Personal details
- Born: Leila Gomes de Barros; 30 September 1971 (age 55) Taguatinga, Federal District, Brazil
- Party: PDT (2022–present)
- Other political affiliations: PRB (2013–18); PSB (2018–21); Cidadania (2021–22)
- Spouse: Emanuel Rego (m. 2003)
- Children: Lukas (b. 2011)
- Volleyball career
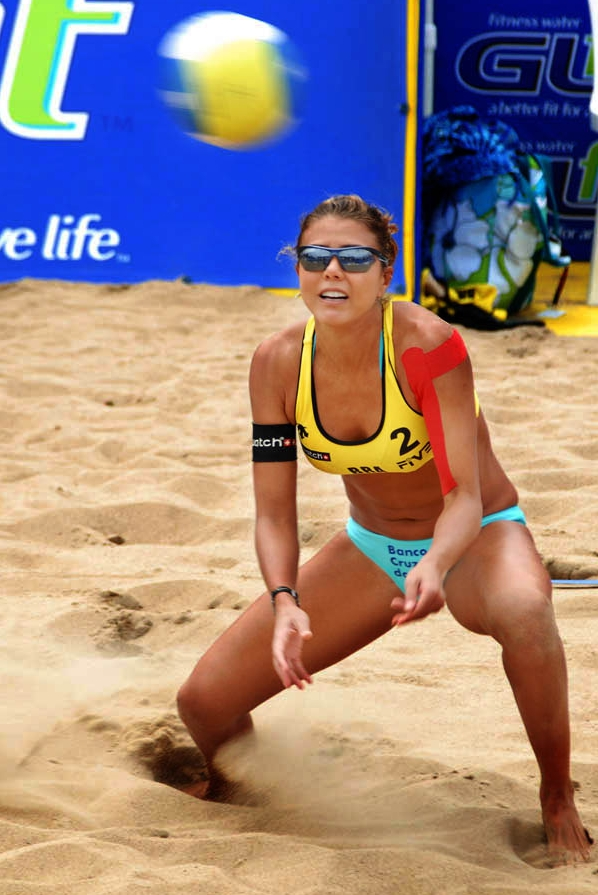
- Barros during her volleyball career in 2007

Personal information
- Height: 1.79 m (5 ft 10 in)
- Spike: 3.00 m (118 in)
- Block: 2.91 m (115 in)

Volleyball information
- Position: Opposite spiker
- Number: 8
Honours
Women's volleyball
Representing Brazil
Olympic Games
Bronze medal – third place	1996 Atlanta	Indoor
Bronze medal – third place	2000 Sydney	Indoor
World Cup
Silver medal – second place	1995 Japan	Indoor
Bronze medal – third place	1999 Japan	Indoor
World Grand Prix
Gold medal – first place	1994 Shanghai
Gold medal – first place	1996 Shanghai
Gold medal – first place	1998 Hong Kong
Gold medal – first place	2004 Reggio Calabria
Silver medal – second place	1995 Shanghai
Silver medal – second place	1999 Yu Xi
Bronze medal – third place	2000 Manila
Pan American Games
Gold medal – first place	1999 Winnipeg	Indoor
CSV South American Championship
Gold medal – first place	1991 Osasco
Gold medal – first place	1995 Porto Alegre
Gold medal – first place	1999 Valencia
Silver medal – second place	1993 Cusco
Women's beach volleyball
FIVB World Tour
Gold medal – first place	2006 Canada Open	Beach
Silver medal – second place	2006 Brazil Open	Beach
Bronze medal – third place	2005 Russia Open	Beach
Bronze medal – third place	2006 Norway Grand Slam	Beach
Bronze medal – third place	2006 France Open	Beach
Bronze medal – third place	2006 France Grand Slam	Beach
Bronze medal – third place	2006 Poland Open	Beach

Leila Gomes de Barros (born 30 September 1971) is a Brazilian politician and former volleyball player. She often played as opposite hitter and attacker. She was a member of the Brazilian squad that had great success in the late 1990s and early 2000s, winning the 1996 and 1998 editions of the FIVB World Grand Prix and being rated the Most Valuable Player in each win.

== Volleyball career ==
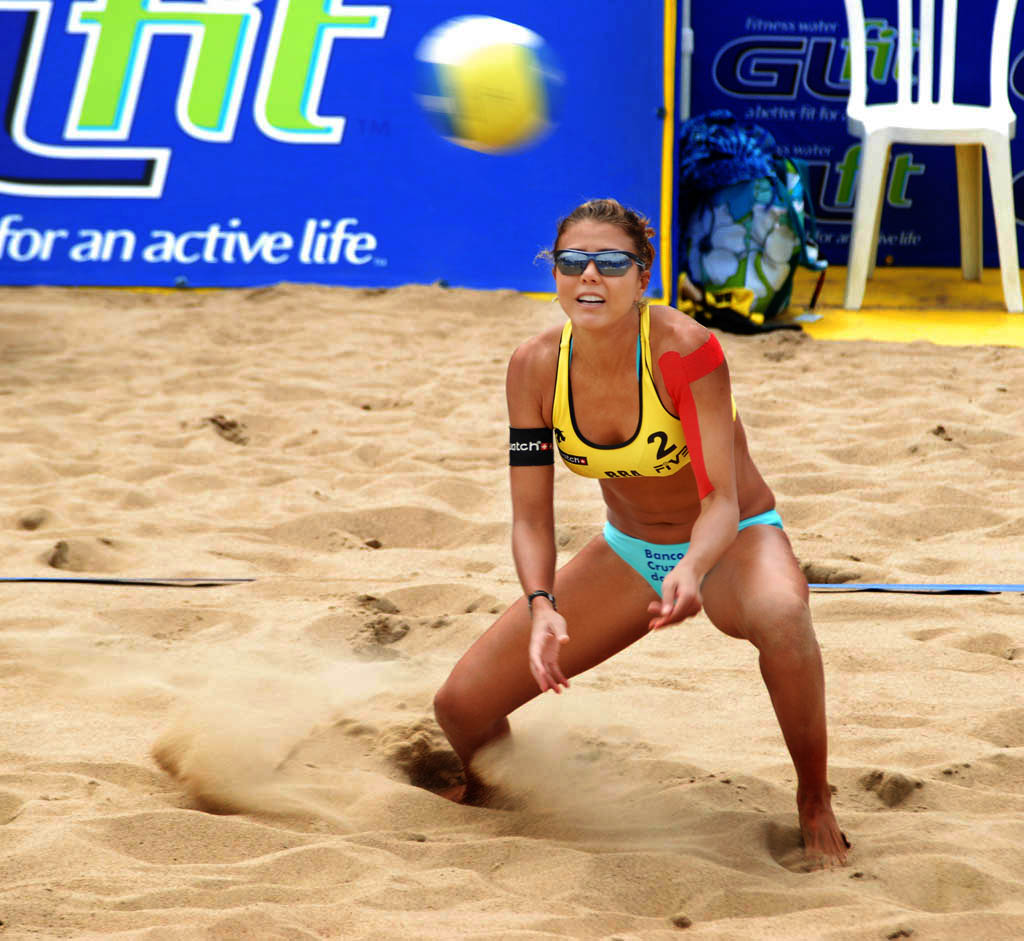
Leila Barros during her volleyball career in 2007

Barros started competing in volleyball at the age of fifteen. She switched to beach volleyball in July 2001, but returned to the indoor courts in 2003 to help the Brazil women's national volleyball team to qualify for the 2004 Summer Olympics in Athens, Greece.

Barros finished in second place in the 1995 and 2003 FIVB World Cup, and won third place in 1999 FIVB World Cup. She also won a silver medal in the 1994 FIVB World Championship. In the Olympics, her Brazilian team won the bronze medal in 1996 and 2000. She has also posed in several magazines, and was one of the most popular players when the Brazilian volleyball team came to the Philippines.

== Political career ==
In October 2018, Barros became the first woman to represent the Federal District of Brazil in the Senate.

Awards
Preceded by (United States) Tara Cross-Battle (Russia) Yevgeniya Artamonova	Most Valuable Player of FIVB World Grand Prix; 1996; 1998	Succeeded by (Russia) Yevgeniya Artamonova (Brazil) Virna Dias
Preceded by Maurren Maggi	Brazilian Sportswomen of the Year; 2000	Succeeded by Daniele Hypólito
Preceded by Vassiliki Arvaniti (GRE)	Women's FIVB World Tour "Most Improved"; 2006	Succeeded by Laura Ludwig (GER); Tamsin Barnett (AUS)
Federal Senate
Preceded by Veneziano Vital do Rêgo	Senate PSB Leader; 2021	None
