= Ma Fang =

Chinese volleyball player

Personal information
- Nationality: Chinese
- Born: 25 January 1965 (age 61); Zhuji, Zhejiang, China
- Height: 170 cm (5 ft 7 in)

Volleyball information
- Position: Setter
- Number: 5

National team
1991–1993	China
Honours
Women's volleyball
Representing China
FIVB World Cup
Silver medal – second place	1991 Japan
FIVB World Grand Prix
Silver medal – second place	1993 Hong Kong
World Grand Champions Cup
Silver medal – second place	1993 Japan

Ma Fang (born 25 January 1965) is a Chinese former volleyball player who competed in the 1992 Summer Olympics in Barcelona.
