= Sandra Suruagy =

Brazilian volleyball player (born 1963)

Personal information
- Full name: Sandra Maria Lima Suruagy
- Born: 17 April 1963 (age 63); Maceió, Alagoas, Brazil
- Height: 1.79 m (5 ft 10 in)
- Weight: 65 kg (143 lb)
- Spike: 297 cm (117 in)
- Block: 288 cm (113 in)

Volleyball information
- Position: Universal
- Number: 12 (1984-1988); 17 (1996)

National team
| 1981–1998 | Brazil |
Medal record
Women's volleyball
Representing Brazil
Olympic Games
| Bronze medal – third place | 1996 Atlanta | Team |
FIVB World Cup
| Silver medal – second place | 1995 Japan | Team |
FIVB World Grand Prix
| Gold medal – first place | 1996 Shanghai |
| Gold medal – first place | 1998 Hong Kong |
| Silver medal – second place | 1995 Shanghai |
South American Championship
| Gold medal – first place | 1981 Santo André |

Sandra Maria Lima Suruagy (born 17 April 1963) is a Brazilian retired volleyball player who represented Brazil at the 1996 Summer Olympics in Atlanta, where she earned a bronze medal with the Women's National Team. She also competed at the 1984 Summer Olympics in Los Angeles and the 1988 Summer Olympics in Seoul.
