= Yumilka Ruiz =

Cuban volleyball player

Yumilka Ruíz

Personal information
- Full name: Yumilka Ruíz Luaces
- Born: 8 May 1978 (age 48); Camagüey, Cuba
- Hometown: Camagüey, Cuba
- Height: 1.80 m (5 ft 11 in)
- Weight: 62 kg (137 lb)
- Spike: 3.29 m (130 in)
- Block: 3.15 m (124 in)

Volleyball information
- Position: Outside hitter
- Number: 1

National team
1996–2008	Cuba
Honours
Women's volleyball
Representing Cuba
Olympic Games
Gold medal – first place	1996 Atlanta	Team
Gold medal – first place	2000 Sydney	Team
Bronze medal – third place	2004 Athens	Team
World Championship
Gold medal – first place	1998 Japan	Team
FIVB World Cup
Gold medal – first place	1999 Japan	Team
World Grand Champions Cup
Silver medal – second place	1997 Japan
World Grand Prix
Gold medal – first place	2000 Quezon City
Silver medal – second place	1996 Shanghai
Silver medal – second place	1997 Kobe
Silver medal – second place	2008 Yokohama
Bronze medal – third place	1995 Shanghai
Bronze medal – third place	1998 Hong Kong
Pan American Games
Gold medal – first place	2007 Rio de Janeiro	Team
Silver medal – second place	2003 Santo Domingo	Team
NORCECA Championship
Gold medal – first place	2007 Winnipeg
Pan-American Cup
Gold medal – first place	2007 Colima
Central American and Caribbean Games
Gold medal – first place	1993 Ponce	Team
Silver medal – second place	2006 Cartagena	Team

Yumilka Daysi Ruíz Luaces (born 8 May 1978) is a Cuban retired volleyball player who represented her native country in four consecutive Summer Olympics, starting in 1996. She won Olympic gold medals with the national team in 1996 and 2000. She also claimed the bronze at the 2004 Olympics. As an outside hitter, she was integral to the dominance of the Cuban team in the late 1990s and early 2000s.

In 2023, Ruíz was inducted into the International Volleyball Hall of Fame.

== Club volleyball ==
Ruíz played the 2004–05 season with the Russian club Uralochka-NTMK, where she set the record of scoring 53 points in a single match and led her team to the championship title.

Ruíz retired in 2008 at age 30. At 1.79 m (5 ft 10 in), she had a jump reach of 3.29 m (10 ft 10 in) at the peak of her career.

After three years of inactivity, Ruíz made a comeback in 2012 to play in Russian League for Uralochka-NTMK Ekaterinburg, and participated in the European Champions League. She retired in 2014.

== International Olympic Committee ==
In August 2008, Ruíz was elected to an eight-year term to the Athletes' Commission of the International Olympic Committee by athletes that cast votes.

== Clubs ==
- (Italy) Medinex Reggio Calabria (1996–2000)
- (Cuba) Ciudad Habana (2000–2006)
- (Russia) Uralochka-NTMK (2004–2005)
- (Cuba) Camagüey (2006–2008)
- (Russia) Uralochka-NTMK (2012–2014)

== Awards ==
=== Individuals ===
- 2002 Pan-American Cup "Most Valuable Player"
- 2002 World Championship "Best Scorer"
- 2003 NORCECA Championship "Most Valuable Player"
- 2004 FIVB World Grand Prix "Best Spiker"
- 2005 Pan-American Cup "Best Spiker"
- 2004-2005 Russian Super League "Most Valuable Player"

=== Clubs ===
- 1998 CEV Cup – Runner-up, with Medinex Reggio Calabria
- 1999 Italian Cup – Runner-up, with Medinex Reggio Calabria
- 1998-99 Italian Championship – Runner-up, with Medinex Reggio Calabria
- 1999-00 Italian Championship – Runner-up, with Medinex Reggio Calabria
- 2000 Italian Cup – Champion, with Medinex Reggio Calabria
- 2000 Italian Super Cup – Champion, with Medinex Reggio Calabria
- 2000 CEV Cup – Champion, with Medinex Reggio Calabria
- 2004-05 Russian Super League – Champion, with Uralochka-NTMK

Awards
Preceded by (Russia) Elizaveta Tishchenko	Best Spiker of FIVB World Grand Prix; 2004	Succeeded by (Cuba) Rosir Calderón
