= Wang Yi (volleyball) =

Chinese volleyball player

Personal information
- Born: May 25, 1973 (age 53) Shanghai, Shanghai, China
- Height: 189 cm (6 ft 2 in)

Volleyball information
- Number: 6

National team
- Years: Team
- 1991–1997: China
Honours
Women's volleyball
Representing China
Olympic Games
Silver medal – second place	1996 Atlanta	Team
World Cup
Silver medal – second place	1991 Japan
Bronze medal – third place	1995 Japan	Team
FIVB World Grand Prix
Silver medal – second place	1993 Hong Kong
World Grand Champions Cup
Silver medal – second place	1993 Japan
Asian Games
Silver medal – second place	1994 Hiroshima	Team

Wang Yi (Chinese: 王怡; pinyin: Wáng Yí, born May 25, 1973) is a Chinese volleyball player who twice went to the Olympic Games with the Chinese team, in 1992 and 1996. She helped the Chinese team win the silver medal at the 1996 Summer Olympics in Atlanta.

== Personal life ==
Educated at Notre Dame de Namur University in Belmont, California, Wang earned a bachelor's degree in business administration in 2002. She has since served as an assistant coach at Pennsylvania State University, Rutgers University, and Columbia University, where she has been employed since 2008.
