= Fernanda Doval =

Brazilian volleyball player (born 1975)

Personal information
- Full name: Fernanda de Carvalho Doval
- Born: 16 July 1975 (age 51); Belo Horizonte, Minas Gerais, Brazil
- Height: 1.90 m (6 ft 3 in)
- Weight: 68 kg (150 lb)
- Spike: 307 cm (121 in)
- Block: 283 cm (111 in)

Volleyball information
- Position: Outside hitter

National team
Brazil
Honours
Women's volleyball
Representing Brazil
World Grand Champions Cup
Bronze medal – third place	1997 Osaka/Tokyo
World Grand Prix
Gold medal – first place	1996 Shanghai

Fernanda Doval (born 16 July 1975) is a Brazilian retired volleyball player. She was part of the Brazil women's national volleyball team.

She participated in the 1994 FIVB Volleyball Women's World Championship. On club level she played with Ponto Frio/Santa Rita.

== Clubs ==
- Ponto Frio/Santa Rita (1994)
