= 1993 FIVB Volleyball World Grand Prix =

International women's volleyball tournament

1993 FIVB World Grand Prix
Tournament details
- Host country: Hong Kong (Group 1 Final)
- Dates: 28 May–30 June
- Teams: 8
- Venue: 1 (in 1 host city)

Final positions
- Champions: Cuba (3rd title)
- Runners-up: China
- Third place: Russia
- Fourth place: Brazil

Tournament awards
- MVP: (Cuba) Mireya Luis
- Best Setter: (Brazil) Fernanda Venturini
- Best OH: (Cuba) Mireya Luis; (Russia) Yevgeniya Estes
- Best MB: (Cuba) Magalys Carvajal; (Brazil) Ana Paula Connelly
- Best OPP: (China) Cui Yongmei

The 1993 FIVB World Grand Prix was the first edition of the women's volleyball tournament, annually arranged by FIVB. It was played by eight countries from 28 May to 30 June 1993. The final round was staged in Hong Kong.

== Preliminary round ==
=== Ranking ===
The top six teams in the preliminary round advance to the final round.

Pos	Team	Pld	W	L	Pts	SW	SL	SR	SPW	SPL	SPR	Qualification
1	Cuba	9	8	1	17	25	8	3.125	451	337	1.338	Final round
2	Brazil	9	7	2	16	23	12	1.917	409	336	1.217	Final round
3	China	9	5	4	14	18	17	1.059	267	297	0.899	Final round
4	South Korea	9	5	4	14	19	18	1.056	425	454	0.936	Final round
5	Russia	9	4	5	13	18	19	0.947	453	452	1.002	Final round
6	Japan	9	3	6	12	16	20	0.800	267	204	1.309	Final round
7	United States	9	3	6	12	15	21	0.714	268	325	0.825	
8	Germany	9	1	8	10	7	26	0.269	159	294	0.541	

=== First round ===
==== Group A ====
- Venue: Seoul, South Korea

Date		Score		Set 1	Set 2	Set 3	Set 4	Set 5	Total
28 May	South Korea	3–2	Brazil	7–15	12–15	15–12	15–8	15–8	64–58
28 May	China	3–1	United States	15–10	11–15	15–10	15–9		56–44
29 May	South Korea	3–0	United States	15–3	15–6	15–12			45–21
29 May	Brazil	3–0	China	17–15	15–13	15–10			47–38
30 May	Brazil	3–1	United States	15–10	14–16	15–12	15–7		59–45
30 May	South Korea	3–1	China	15–5	15–13	13–15	15–10		58–43

==== Group B ====
- Venue: Tokyo, Japan

Date		Score		Set 1	Set 2	Set 3	Set 4	Set 5	Total
28 May	Russia	3–1	Cuba	16–14	15–7	7–15	15–10		53–46
28 May	Japan	3–0	Germany	15–8	15–8	15–2			45–18
29 May	Cuba	3–0	Germany	15–10	15–8	15–6			45–24
29 May	Japan	3–1	Russia	16–14	5–15	15–5	15–12		51–46
30 May	Russia	3–1	Germany	15–7	7–15	15–5	15–8		52–35
30 May	Cuba	3–1	Japan	13–15	15–11	15–11	15–10		58–47

=== Second round ===
==== Group C ====
- Venue: Bangkok, Thailand

Date		Score		Set 1	Set 2	Set 3	Set 4	Set 5	Total
4 Jun	Cuba	3–0	South Korea	15–3	15–2	15–9			45–14
4 Jun	Brazil	3–1	Russia	11–15	15–5	15–9	15–3		56–32
5 Jun	Cuba	3–0	Brazil	15–7	15–12	15–2			45–21
5 Jun	Russia	3–1	South Korea	15–10	15–12	13–15	15–6		58–43
6 Jun	Cuba	3–1	Russia	15–13	15–6	8–15	15–12		53–46
6 Jun	Brazil	3–2	South Korea	14–16	7–15	16–14	15–10	15–11	67–66

==== Group D ====
- Venue: Kuala Lumpur, Malaysia

Date		Score		Set 1	Set 2	Set 3	Set 4	Set 5	Total
4 Jun	China	3–0	Germany	16–14	17–15	15–5			48–34
4 Jun	United States	3–0	Japan	15–7	15–6	15–13			45–26
5 Jun	Germany	3–2	Japan	12–15	7–15	15–10	17–15	15–9	66–64
5 Jun	China	3–2	United States	15–9	11–15	8–15	15–12	15–12	64–63
6 Jun	United States	3–1	Germany	15–12	15–1	9–15	15–10		54–38
6 Jun	China	3–1	Japan	15–13	15–11	9–15	15–10		54–49

=== Third round ===
==== Group E ====
- Venue: Sydney, Australia

Date		Score		Set 1	Set 2	Set 3	Set 4	Set 5	Total
11 Jun	China	3–1	United States	15–8	15–7	6–15	15–5		51–35
11 Jun	Cuba	3–1	Russia	15–8	15–8	15–17	15–5		60–38
12 Jun	Cuba	3–1	China	14–16	15–3	15–8	15–13		59–40
12 Jun	United States	3–2	Russia	7–15	13–15	15–13	17–16	17–15	69–74
13 Jun	Russia	3–1	China	9–15	15–10	15–6	15–8		54–39
13 Jun	Cuba	3–1	United States	16–14	15–11	3–15	16–14		50–54

==== Group F ====
- Venue: Taipei, Taiwan

Date		Score		Set 1	Set 2	Set 3	Set 4	Set 5	Total
11 Jun	South Korea	3–1	Germany	15–9	15–9	7–15	15–4		52–37
11 Jun	Brazil	3–1	Japan	?–?	?–?	?–?	?–?		?–?
12 Jun	South Korea	3–2	Japan	8–15	1–15	16–14	15–12	15–13	55–69
12 Jun	Brazil	3–0	Germany	15–10	15–3	15–5			45–18
13 Jun	Brazil	3–1	South Korea	11–15	15–3	15–5	15–5		56–28
13 Jun	Japan	3–1	Germany	15–4	15–8	10–15	15–0		55–27

== Final round ==
- Venue: Hong Kong

=== Pool play ===
==== Group G ====
Pos	Team	Pld	W	L	Pts	SW	SL	SR	SPW	SPL	SPR	Qualification
1	China	2	1	1	3	5	4	1.250	118	99	1.192	Final
2	Russia	2	1	1	3	4	4	1.000	92	99	0.929	3rd place match
3	South Korea	2	1	1	3	4	5	0.800	106	118	0.898	

Date		Score		Set 1	Set 2	Set 3	Set 4	Set 5	Total
17 Jun	South Korea	3–2	China	9–15	5–15	16–14	16–14	15–6	61–64
18 Jun	China	3–1	Russia	15–6	15–13	9–15	15–4		54–38
19 Jun	Russia	3–1	South Korea	9–15	15–13	15–5	15–12		54–45

==== Group H ====
Pos	Team	Pld	W	L	Pts	SW	SL	SR	SPW	SPL	SPR	Qualification
1	Cuba	2	2	0	4	6	1	6.000	100	59	1.695	Final
2	Brazil	2	1	1	3	3	4	0.750	76	90	0.844	3rd place match
3	Japan	2	0	2	2	2	6	0.333	82	109	0.752	

Date		Score		Set 1	Set 2	Set 3	Set 4	Set 5	Total
17 Jun	Cuba	3–0	Brazil	15–5	15–10	15–7			45–22
18 Jun	Cuba	3–1	Japan	10–15	15–5	15–7	15–10		55–37
19 Jun	Brazil	3–1	Japan	9–15	15–12	15–11	15–7		54–45

=== Final four ===
==== 3rd place match ====
Date		Score		Set 1	Set 2	Set 3	Set 4	Set 5	Total
20 Jun	Russia	3–1	Brazil	3–15	15–10	17–15	15–7		50–47

==== Final ====
Date		Score		Set 1	Set 2	Set 3	Set 4	Set 5	Total
20 Jun	China	0–3	Cuba	1–15	4–15	7–15			12–45

== Final standings ==
Place	Team
1st place, gold medalist(s)	Cuba
2nd place, silver medalist(s)	China
3rd place, bronze medalist(s)	Russia
4	Brazil
5	South Korea
6	Japan
7	United States
8	Germany

1993 FIVB World Grand Prix winners

Cuba
First title

== See also ==
- 1993 FIVB World League

== Individual awards ==
- Most valuable player: Mireya Luis (CUB)
- Best scorer: Mireya Luis (CUB)
- Best spiker: Yevgeniya Estes (RUS)
- Best blocker: Magalys Carvajal (CUB)
- Best server: Yevgeniya Estes (RUS)
- Best receiver: Yelena Tyurina (RUS)
- Best setter: Fernanda Venturini (BRA)
- Best outside spikers
  (Cuba) Mireya Luis
  (Russia) Yevgeniya Estes
- Best middle blocker
  (Cuba) Magalys Carvajal
  (Brazil) Ana Paula Connelly
- Best opposite spiker
  (China) Cui Yongmei

== Statistics leaders ==
- Only players whose teams advanced to the final four are ranked.

Best scorers

Rank	Name	Points
1	(Cuba) Mireya Luis	124
2	(Russia) Yevegeniya Estes	120
3	(Cuba) Magalys Carvajal	109
4	(Brazil) Hilma Caldeira	105
5	(Cuba) Regla Bell	99
6	(Brazil) Ericleia Bodziak	95
7	(China) Sun Yue	91
8	(Brazil) Ana Paula Connelly	88
9	(Russia) Elena Batukhtina	86
10	(China) Cui Yongmei	83

Best blockers

Rank	Name	Avg
1	(Cuba) Magalys Carvajal	1.35
2	(Brazil) Ana Paula Connelly	1.16
3	(Cuba) Regla Torres	0.97
4	(China) Lai Yawen	0.92
5	(Russia) Elena Chebukina	0.87

Best servers

Rank	Name	Avg
1	(Russia) Yevgeniya Estes	0.46
2	(Cuba) Mireya Luis	0.39
3	(China) Cui Yongmei	0.36
4	(Russia) Elena Batukhtina	0.32
5	(Brazil) Fernanda Venturini	0.30

Best receivers

Rank	Name	%Succ
1	(Russia) Elena Batukhtina	73.34
2	(Cuba) Mireya Luis	70.21
3	(China) Lai Yawen	68.67

Best diggers

Rank	Name	Avg
1	(China) Sun Yue	3.26
2	(Cuba) Mireya Luis	3.10
3	(China) Cui Yongmei	2.88

Best setters

Rank	Name	Avg	Succ
1	(Brazil) Fernanda Venturini	11.43	58.23
2	(Russia) Tatiana Gratcheva	7.57	46.43
3	(China) Ma Fang	6.32	50.22
4	(Cuba) Marlenis Costa	5.37	52.11
5	(Cuba) Lilia Izquierdo	4.47	47.11
