= 1996 FIVB Women's World Olympic Qualification Tournament =

The 1996 Women's Volleyball Olympic Qualifier was played by eight countries to determine the last three competing teams for the 1996 Summer Olympics in Atlanta, Georgia. The tournament was held in Tokyo, Japan from May 26 to June 2, 1996. The top-three teams advance to the Olympic Games with one berth guaranteed for an Asian country.

== Teams ==
- Bulgaria
- Chinese Taipei
- Croatia
- Italy
- Japan
- Netherlands
- Romania
- Ukraine

== Round robin ==
26 May 1996	Netherlands	3–0	Croatia
26 May 1996	(15–10, 15–7, 15–11)

26 May 1996	Ukraine	3–0	Chinese Taipei
26 May 1996	(15–12, 15–13, 15–4)

26 May 1996	Bulgaria	3–2	Italy
26 May 1996	(12–15, 13–15, 15–8, 15–9, 15–10)

26 May 1996	Japan	3–1	Romania
26 May 1996	(10–15, 15–5, 15–6, 15–2)

27 May 1996	Croatia	3–2	Bulgaria
27 May 1996	(15–12, 16–14, 8–15, 7–15, 15–12)

27 May 1996	Netherlands	3–0	Chinese Taipei
27 May 1996	(15–3, 15–5, 15–11)

27 May 1996	Italy	3–0	Romania
27 May 1996	(15–11, 15–8, 15–10)

27 May 1996	Japan	3–0	Ukraine
27 May 1996	(17–15, 15–11, 15–1)

28 May 1996	Croatia	3–0	Italy
28 May 1996	(15–13, 15–9, 15–4)

28 May 1996	Bulgaria	3–0	Chinese Taipei
28 May 1996	(15–5, 15–9, 15–6)

28 May 1996	Ukraine	3–0	Romania
28 May 1996	(15–3, 15–1, 15–13)

28 May 1996	Netherlands	3–1	Japan
28 May 1996	(15–10, 10–15, 15–6, 15–11)

30 May 1996	Ukraine	3–2	Netherlands
30 May 1996	(10–15, 10–15, 15–11, 15–10, 19–17)

30 May 1996	Croatia	3–0	Romania
30 May 1996	(15–5, 15–5, 15–7)

30 May 1996	Italy	3–0	Chinese Taipei
30 May 1996	(15–5, 15–6, 15–5)

30 May 1996	Japan	3–0	Bulgaria
30 May 1996	(15–11, 15–9, 15–3)

31 May 1996	Ukraine	3–0	Bulgaria
31 May 1996	(15–4, 15–7, 15–8)

31 May 1996	Croatia	3–1	Chinese Taipei
31 May 1996	(20–22, 16–14, 15–12, 15–6)

31 May 1996	Netherlands	3–0	Romania
31 May 1996	(15–10, 15–9, 15–3)

31 May 1996	Japan	3–0	Italy
31 May 1996	(15–4, 15–0, 15–7)

1 June 1996	Romania	3–1	Chinese Taipei
1 June 1996	(16–17, 15–8, 15–9, 15–12)

1 June 1996	Netherlands	3–0	Bulgaria
1 June 1996	(15–7, 15–9, 15–6)

1 June 1996	Ukraine	3–0	Italy
1 June 1996	(15–8, 15–8, 15–6)

1 June 1996	Japan	3–0	Croatia
1 June 1996	(15–10, 15–4, 15–6)

2 June 1996	Bulgaria	3–0	Romania
2 June 1996	(15–10, 15–5, 15–11)

2 June 1996	Netherlands	3–1	Italy
2 June 1996	(15–8, 11–15, 15–10, 15–6)

2 June 1996	Croatia	3–2	Ukraine
2 June 1996	(15–5, 15–10, 13–15, 10–15, 15–11)

2 June 1996	Japan	3–0	Chinese Taipei
2 June 1996	(15–11, 15–9, 15–7)

== Final ranking ==
	Team	Points	G	W	L	PW	PL	Ratio	SW	SL	Ratio
1.	Japan	13	7	6	1			1.696	19	4	4.750
2.	Netherlands	13	7	6	1			1.430	20	5	4.000
3.	Ukraine	12	7	5	2			1.366	17	8	2.125
4.	Croatia	11	7	5	2			1.026	15	11	1.366
5.	Bulgaria	10	7	3	4			1.026	11	14	0.786
6.	Italy	9	7	2	5			0.801	9	15	0.600
7.	Romania	8	7	1	6			0.598	3	18	0.166
8.	Chinese Taipei	7	7	0	7			0.628	0	21	0.000

- Japan, Ukraine and the Netherlands qualified for the 1996 Summer Olympics in Atlanta, Georgia.
