= Fernanda Venturini =

Brazilian volleyball player (born 1970)

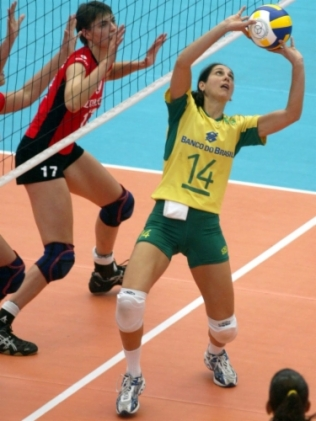

Personal information
- Full name: Fernanda Porto Venturini Rezende
- Born: 24 October 1970 (age 56) Araraquara, São Paulo, Brazil
- Height: 1.85 m (6 ft 1 in)
- Weight: 68 kg (150 lb)
- Spike: 292 cm (115 in)
- Block: 280 cm (110 in)

Volleyball information
- Position: Setter
- Number: 14

National team
- Years: Team
- 1984–2004: Brazil
Honours
Women's volleyball
Representing Brazil
Olympic Games
Bronze medal – third place	1996 Atlanta	Team
World Championship
Silver medal – second place	1994 Brazil	Team
World Cup
Silver medal – second place	1995 Japan	Team
Silver medal – second place	2003 Japan	Team
World Grand Champions Cup
Bronze medal – third place	1997 Japan
World Grand Prix
Gold medal – first place	1994 Xangai
Gold medal – first place	1996 Xangai
Gold medal – first place	2004 Reggio Calabria	Team
Silver medal – second place	1995 Xangai
Goodwill Games
Bronze medal – third place	1990 Seattle
Pan American Games
Silver medal – second place	1991 Havana	Team
CSV South American Championship
Gold medal – first place	1991 Osasco
Gold medal – first place	1995 Porto Alegre
Gold medal – first place	2003 Bogotá
Silver medal – second place	1989 Curitiba
Silver medal – second place	1993 Cusco

Fernanda Porto Venturini (born 24 October 1970) is a Brazilian former volleyball player and a four-time Olympian. She competed at the 1996 Summer Olympics in Atlanta, where she won the bronze medal with the Brazilian women's national volleyball team. She is regarded as one of the best setters of all time.

In 2022, Venturini was inducted into the International Volleyball Hall of Fame.

== Clubs ==
- (Brazil) Recra/Ribeirão Preto (1984–1985)
- (Brazil) São Caetano (1986–1987)
- (Brazil) Sadia Esporte Clube (1987–1991)
- (Brazil) Minas Tênis Clube (1991–1992)
- (Brazil) Recra/Ribeirão Preto (1992–1994)
- (Brazil) Soracaba Esporte Clube (1994–1997)
- (Brazil) Paraná (1997–2000)
- (Brazil) Vasco da Gama (2000–2001)
- (Brazil) Osasco (2002–2004)
- (Brazil) Rio de Janeiro (2004–2006)
- (Spain) CAV Murcia 2005 (2007–2008)
- (Brazil) Rio de Janeiro (2011–2012)

== Awards ==
=== Individuals ===
- 1989 FIVB U20 World Championship – "Best Setter"
- 1991 FIVB Club World Championship – "Best Setter"
- 1991 FIVB Volleyball Women's World Cup "Best Setter"
- 1993 FIVB World Grand Prix – "Best Setter"
- 1994 FIVB World Grand Prix – "Most Valuable Player"
- 1994 FIVB World Grand Prix – "Best Setter"
- 1994 FIVB Club World Championship – "Best Setter"
- 1995 FIVB World Grand Prix – "Best Setter"
- 1995 FIVB Volleyball Women's World Cup "Best Setter"
- 1996 Summer Olympics – "Best Setter"
- 1996 FIVB World Grand Prix – "Best Setter"
- 1996 Montreux Volley Masters – "Best Setter"
- 1996 Montreux Volley Masters – "Best Server"
- 1997 World Grand Champions Cup – "Best Setter"
- 1998 FIVB Club World Championship – "Best Setter"
- 2003 FIVB World Grand Prix – "Best Setter"
- 2003 FIVB World Grand Prix – "2003 Dream team Setter"
- 2003 FIVB World Cup "Best Setter"
- 2004 FIVB World Grand Prix – "Best Setter"

Awards
Preceded by First Award (Brazil) Marcelle Rodrigues	Best Setter of FIVB World Grand Prix; 1993, 1994, 1995; 2003, 2004	Succeeded by (Brazil) Ana Flávia Sanglard (China) Feng Kun
Preceded by (Cuba) Mireya Luis	Most Valuable Player of FIVB World Grand Prix; 1994	Succeeded by (United States) Tara Cross-Battle
