= Marlenis Costa =

Cuban volleyball player (born 1973)

Personal information
- Full name: Marlenis Costa Blanco
- Born: 30 July 1973 (age 53); La Palma, Cuba
- Height: 1.77 m (5 ft 10 in)

Volleyball information
- Position: Setter
- Number: 2

National team
| 1991–2000 | Cuba |
Honours
Women's volleyball
Representing Cuba
Olympic Games
| Gold medal – first place | 1992 Barcelona | Team |
| Gold medal – first place | 1996 Atlanta | Team |
| Gold medal – first place | 2000 Sydney | Team |
World Championship
| Gold medal – first place | 1994 Brazil | Team |
| Gold medal – first place | 1998 Japan | Team |
FIVB World Cup
| Gold medal – first place | 1991 Japan |
| Gold medal – first place | 1995 Japan | Team |
| Gold medal – first place | 1999 Japan | Team |
FIVB World Grand Prix
| Gold medal – first place | 1993 Hong Kong |
| Silver medal – second place | 1994 Shanghai |
| Silver medal – second place | 1996 Shanghai |
| Bronze medal – third place | 1995 Shanghai |
| Bronze medal – third place | 1998 Hong Kong |
World Grand Champions Cup
| Gold medal – first place | 1993 Japan |
Pan American Games
| Gold medal – first place | 1991 Havana | Team |
| Gold medal – first place | 1995 Mar del Plata | Team |
| Silver medal – second place | 1999 Winnipeg | Team |
Central American and Caribbean Games
| Gold medal – first place | 1998 Maracaibo | Team |

Marlenis Costa Blanco (born 30 July 1973) is a Cuban former volleyball player and three-time Olympic champion. Costa was a member of the Cuban women's national volleyball team that won gold medals in the 1992 Summer Olympics in Barcelona, the 1996 Summer Olympics in Atlanta, and the 2000 Summer Olympics in Sydney. As a setter, she was one of the key players in the dominance of the Cuban national team in the 1990s. Due to her versatility, she was also an effective attacker.

== World Cups and World Championships ==
Costa won gold medals in the 1991, 1995, and 1999 FIVB World Cups in Japan. Costa also helped Cuba win the 1994 FIVB World Championship in Brazil and the 1998 FIVB World Championship in Japan.

== Pan American Games ==
While representing Cuba, Costa also won gold medals in the 1991 Pan American Games in Havana and the 1995 Pan American Games in Mar del Plata, and won a silver medal in the 1999 Pan American Games in Winnipeg.
