= Cui Yongmei =

Chinese volleyball player (born 1969)

Personal information
- Nationality: Chinese
- Born: 23 January 1969 (age 57); Yantai, Shandong, China
- Height: 181 cm (5 ft 11 in)

Volleyball information
- Position: Opposite
- Number: 9 (1988); 3 (1996)

National team
1988–1998	China
Honours
Women's volleyball
Representing China
Olympic Games
Bronze medal – third place	1988 Seoul	Team
Silver medal – second place	1996 Atlanta	Team
World Championship
Silver medal – second place	1998 Japan	Team
FIVB World Cup
Bronze medal – third place	1995 Japan	Team
World Grand Champions Cup
Silver medal – second place	1993 Japan
Asian Games
Silver medal – second place	1994 Hiroshima	Team

Cui Yongmei (Chinese: 崔咏梅; pinyin: Cuī Yǒngméi, born 23 January 1969) is a Chinese former volleyball player who won a bronze medal at the 1988 Summer Olympics in Seoul and a silver medal at the 1996 Summer Olympics in Atlanta.
