= Ericleia Bodziak =

Brazilian volleyball player (born 1969)

Personal information
- Nickname: Filó
- Born: 26 September 1969 (age 57); Curitiba, Paraná, Brazil
- Height: 1.92 m (6 ft 3 1/2 in)
- Weight: 84 kg (185 lb)
- Spike: 310 cm (122 in)

Volleyball information
- Position: Outside hitter
- Number: 12

National team
1993–1996	Brazil
Honours
Women's volleyball
Representing Brazil
Summer Olympics
Bronze medal – third place	1996 Atlanta	Team
FIVB World Grand Prix
Gold medal – first place	1996 Shanghai
CSV South American Championship
Silver medal – second place	1993 Cusco

Ericleia Bodziak (26 September 1969), also known as Filó, is a Brazilian female retired volleyball player. She participated in the 1996 Summer Olympics in Atlanta, where she won a bronze medal with the Brazilian women's national volleyball team.

== Personal life ==
Bodziak is currently married to Daniele Giorgi and has a daughter named Yasmin.

== Clubs ==
Club	Country	From	To
CA Pirelli	Brazil	1987	1988
Lufkin EC	Brazil	1989	1991
Virtus Reggio Calabria	Italy	1992	1993
EC Pinheiros	Brazil	1995	1996
Leites Nestlé	Brazil	1996	1997
São Cristóvão/São Caetano	Brazil	1997	1999
Flamengo	Brazil	1999	1999
Volley Soliera	Italy	2000	2001
Sesc-RJ	Brazil	2002	2003
Rota Volley	Italy	2007	2008
Pallavolo Reggio Emilia	Italy	2009	2010
