= Regla Bell =

Cuban volleyball player (born 1970)

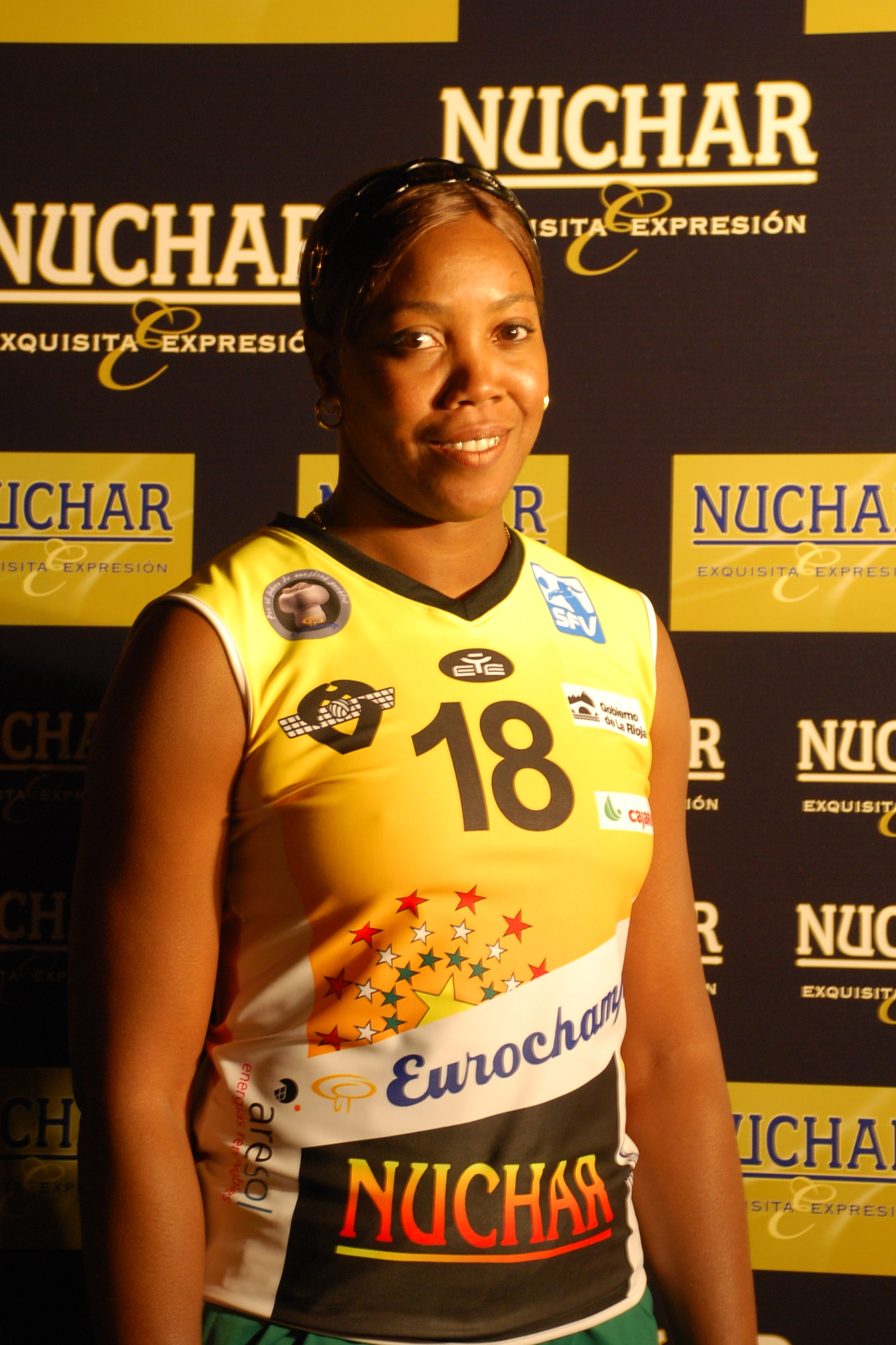

Personal information
- Full name: Regla Maritza Bell MacKenzie
- Born: 6 July 1970 (age 56); Havana, Cuba
- Hometown: Santa Cruz de Tenerife, Spain
- Height: 1.80 m (5 ft 11 in)
- Weight: 73 kg (161 lb)
- Spike: 326 cm (128 in)
- Block: 313 cm (123 in)

Volleyball information
- Position: Outside hitter / Opposite
- Number: 8 (national team)

National team
1988–2000	Cuba
Honours
Women's volleyball
Representing Cuba
Olympic Games
Gold medal – first place	1992 Barcelona	Team
Gold medal – first place	1996 Atlanta	Team
Gold medal – first place	2000 Sydney	Team
World Championship
Gold medal – first place	1994 Brazil	Team
Gold medal – first place	1998 Japan	Team
FIVB World Cup
Gold medal – first place	1989 Japan
Gold medal – first place	1991 Japan
Gold medal – first place	1995 Japan	Team
Gold medal – first place	1999 Japan	Team
FIVB World Grand Prix
Gold medal – first place	1993 Hong Kong
Gold medal – first place	2000 Quezon City
Silver medal – second place	1994 Shanghai
Silver medal – second place	1996 Shanghai
Silver medal – second place	1997 Kobe
Bronze medal – third place	1995 Shanghai
Bronze medal – third place	1998 Hong Kong
World Grand Champions Cup
Gold medal – first place	1993 Japan
Silver medal – second place	1997 Japan
Pan American Games
Gold medal – first place	1991 Havana	Team
Gold medal – first place	1995 Mar del Plata	Team
Silver medal – second place	1999 Winnipeg	Team

Regla Maritza Bell MacKenzie (Havana, 1970) is one of the great legends of Cuban and world volleyball. A left-handed attacker of tremendous power and charisma, she was a key figure in the Cuban national team known as “Las Espectaculares Morenas del Caribe” (“The Spectacular Caribbean Girls"), the squad that dominated women's world volleyball in the 1990s and early 2000s.

With Cuba, she won three Olympic gold medals (Barcelona 1992, Atlanta 1996 and Sydney 2000), two World Championship titles (1994 and 1998) and four World Cups (1989, 1991, 1995 and 1999). Unlike Lilia Izquierdo, with whom she shares the achievement of being the only players worldwide to have achieved these nine major titles, Bell played as a starter in every game and was never substituted. She was captain of the national team at the Sydney 2000 Olympic Games.

After shining with the national team, she played in professional leagues in Italy, Brazil and Spain. She is currently dedicated to training and developing young volleyball players.

Her induction into the International Volleyball Hall of Fame confirmed the impact and legacy of a champion “left-hander".

== Career ==
=== National team ===
Bell won three consecutive gold medals at the Summer Olympic Games (1992, 1996 and 2000), two consecutive gold medals at the FIVB Women's Volleyball World Championship (1994 and 1998), and four consecutive gold medals at the FIVB Volleyball World Cup (1989, 1991, 1995 and 1999).

She was captain of the Cuban team at the Sydney 2000 Olympic Games.

Bell also won gold medals at the Pan American Games in 1991 and 1995, a silver medal at the 1999 Pan American Games, and seven gold medals at the NORCECA Women's Volleyball Championship (one of them at U18 level). She also claimed gold medals in the following competitions: two in the World Grand Prix, six in the Montreux Volley Masters and two in the World Top Four.

Among other accolades, she amassed 28 gold medals, 9 silver medals and 3 bronze medals in the most important world competitions with the senior Cuban women's national volleyball team.

=== Club volleyball ===
For the regular season of the 2008–09 Spanish Superliga, Bell was elected MVP and Best Scorer after hitting 439 kills during that regular league.

Bell played for São Caetano/Blausiegel in Brazil for the 2009–10 season. She then played for the Spanish team Fígaro Peluqueros Tenerife for the 2010–11 season.

Bell played for the Indonesian club Monokwari Valeria during the 2012–13 season of the Indonesian volleyball league, and later signed up for a two-month contract with PLDT HOME TVolution, a Philippine volleyball team that participated at the 2014 Asian Women's Club Volleyball Championship.

== Clubs ==
- Ciudad Habana (1991–1997)
- Assid Ester Napoli (1998)
- Despar Perugia (1998–2000)
- UCAM Murcia (2002–2004)
- Grupo 2002 Murcia (2005–2006)
- Promociones Percan (2006–2007)
- Ciudad Las Palmas G.C. Cantur (2007–2009)
- São Caetano/Blausiegel (2009–2010)
- Fígaro Peluqueros Tenerife (2010–2011)
- Nuchar Eurochamp Murillo (2011–2012)
- Manokwari Valeria (2012–2013)
- PLDT HOME TVolution (2014)

== Career Honours ==
- 1987 – GOLD medal - Women's NORCECA Volleyball Championship in Cuba (U18)
- 1989 – GOLD medal - FIVB Volleyball World Cup in Japan
- 1989 – GOLD medal - NORCECA Volleyball Championship in Puerto Rico
- 1991 – GOLD medal - FIVB Volleyball World Cup in Japan
- 1991 – GOLD medal - Pan American Games in Cuba
- 1991 – GOLD medal - NORCECA Volleyball Championship in Canada
- 1992 – GOLD medal - 1992 Summer Olympics in Barcelona (Spain)
- 1993 – GOLD medal - Grand Prix in Hong Kong
- 1993 – GOLD medal - NORCECA Volleyball Championship in United States
- 1994 – GOLD medal - 1994 FIVB World Championship in Brazil
- 1994 – SILVER medal - FIVB World Grand Prix in China
- 1995 – GOLD medal - NORCECA Volleyball Championship in Dominican Republic
- 1995 – GOLD medal - Pan American Games in Argentina
- 1995 – GOLD medal - FIVB Volleyball World Cup in Japan
- 1995 – BRONZE medal - FIVB World Grand Prix in China
- 1996 – GOLD medal - 1996 Summer Olympics in Atlanta (United States)
- 1996 – SILVER medal - FIVB World Grand Prix in China
- 1997 – GOLD medal - NORCECA Volleyball Championship in Puerto Rico
- 1997 – SILVER medal - FIVB World Grand Prix in China
- 1998 – Medalla de ORO - 1998 FIVB World Championship in Japan
- 1998 – BRONZE medal - FIVB World Grand Prix in China
- 1999 – GOLD medal - NORCECA Volleyball Championship in Mexico
- 1999 – GOLD medal - FIVB Volleyball World Cup in Japan
- 1999 – SILVER medal - Pan American Games in Canada
- 2000 – GOLD medal - 2000 Summer Olympics in Sídney (Australia)
- 2000 – GOLD medal - FIVB World Grand Prix in China

Other championships:

- FIVB Volleyball Women's U21 World Championship - 1 SILVER medal (1989)
- Montreux Volley Masters - 5 GOLD medals (1992, 1993, 1996, 1998 y 1999), 2 SILVER medals (1990 y 1995) y 1 BRONZE medal (1991)
- World Top Four - 2 GOLD medals (1992 y 1994)
- World Super Challenge - 1 SILVER medal (1996)

== Awards ==
=== Individuals ===
- 1993 FIVB Volleyball Women's World Grand Champions Cup "Most valuable player"
- 1993 FIVB Volleyball Women's World Grand Champions Cup "Best spiker"
- 1993 FIVB Volleyball Women's World Grand Champions Cup "Best receiver"
- 1997 FIVB Volleyball Women's World Grand Champions Cup "Best spiker"
- 2009 Spanish Superliga Regular Season "Most valuable player"
- 2009 Spanish Superliga Regular Season "Best scorer"
- 2024 International Volleyball Hall of Fame

=== Clubs ===
- 1999 Italian Cup - Champion, with Despar Perugia
