= Mireya Luis =

Cuban volleyball player

Mireya Luis OLY
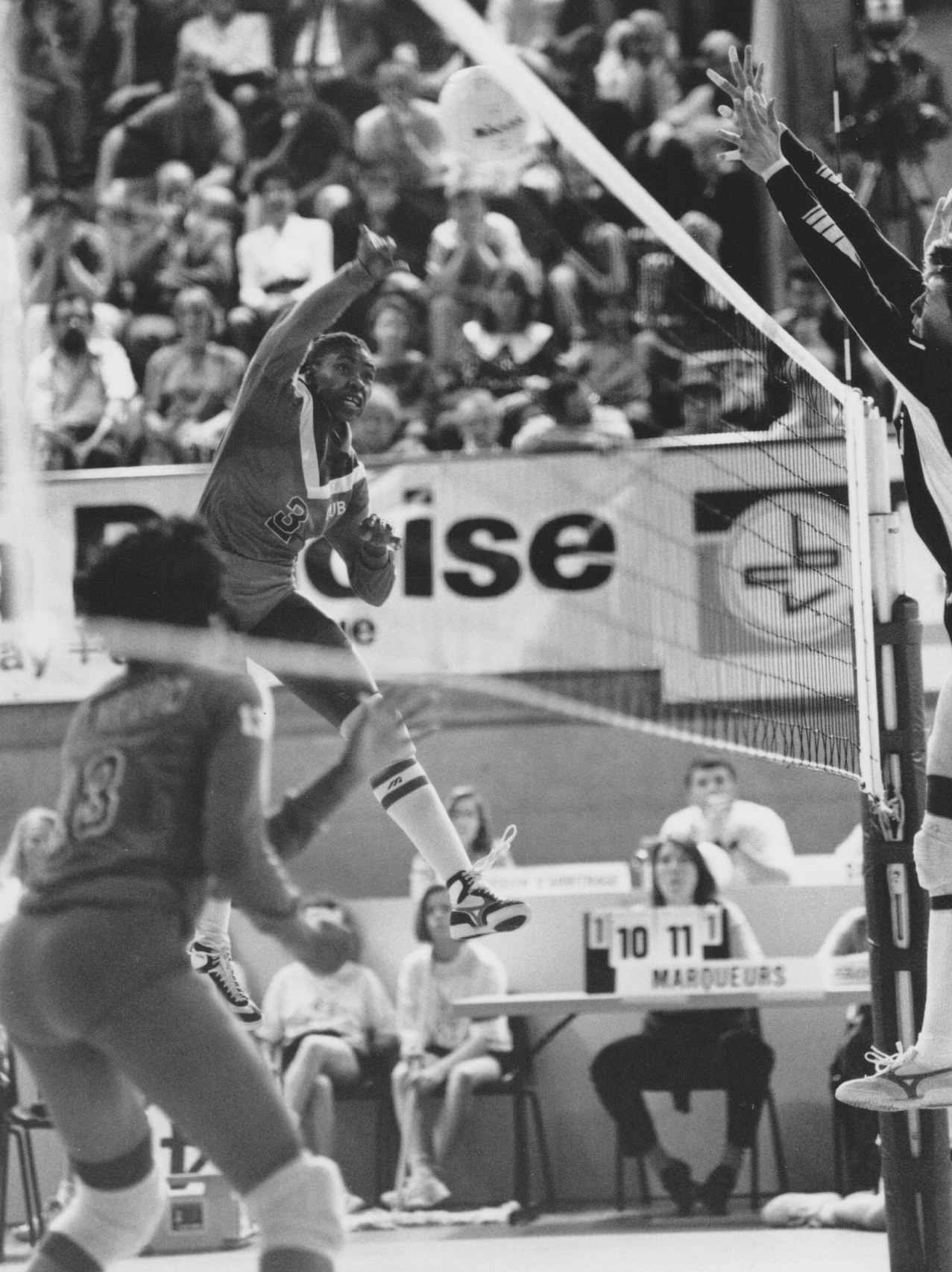

Personal information
- Full name: Alejandrina Mireya Luis Hernández
- Born: 25 August 1967 (age 59) Camagüey, Cuba
- Height: 1.75 m (5 ft 9 in)
- Weight: 69 kg (152 lb)
- Spike: 339 cm (133 in)
- Block: 325 cm (128 in)

Volleyball information
- Position: Outside hitter
- Number: 3

National team
- Years: Team
- 1983–2001: Cuba
Honours
Women's volleyball
Representing Cuba
Olympic Games
Gold medal – first place	1992 Barcelona	Team
Gold medal – first place	1996 Atlanta	Team
Gold medal – first place	2000 Sydney	Team
World Championship
Gold medal – first place	1994 Brazil	Team
Gold medal – first place	1998 Japan	Team
Silver medal – second place	1986 Czechoslovakia	Team
FIVB World Cup
Gold medal – first place	1989 Japan
Gold medal – first place	1991 Japan
Gold medal – first place	1995 Japan	Team
Silver medal – second place	1985 Japan
World Grand Champions Cup
Gold medal – first place	1993 Japan
Silver medal – second place	1997 Japan
FIVB World Grand Prix
Gold medal – first place	1993 Hong Kong
Gold medal – first place	2000 Quezon City
Silver medal – second place	1994 Shanghai
Silver medal – second place	1996 Shanghai
Silver medal – second place	1997 Kobe
Bronze medal – third place	1995 Shanghai
Bronze medal – third place	1998 Hong Kong
Friendship Games
Gold medal – first place	1984 Varna
Pan American Games
Gold medal – first place	1983 Caracas	Team
Gold medal – first place	1987 Indianapolis	Team
Gold medal – first place	1991 Havana	Team
Gold medal – first place	1995 Mar del Plata	Team
Silver medal – second place	1999 Winnipeg	Team
NORCECA Volleyball Championship
Gold medal – first place	1985 Santiago de los Caballeros
Gold medal – first place	1987 Havana
Gold medal – first place	1989 San Juan
Gold medal – first place	1991 Regina
Gold medal – first place	1993 Colorado Springs
Gold medal – first place	1995 Santo Domingo
Gold medal – first place	1997 Caguas
Central American and Caribbean Games
Gold medal – first place	1998 Maracaibo	Team

Alejandrina Mireya Luis Hernández (born 25 August 1967) is a Cuban former volleyball player and three-time Olympic gold medalist. She won gold medals at the 1992, 1996, and 2000 Olympics with the Cuban women's national volleyball team. She was the captain of the Cuban team from the late 1980s until her retirement.

In 2004, Mireya was inducted into the International Volleyball Hall of Fame.

== Career ==
=== Pan American Games ===
At the age of 10, Mireya started playing volleyball. At 16, Mireya joined the Cuban national team for the 1983 Pan American Games, winning a gold medal. She competed at the 1987 Pan American Games, again helping Cuba win the tournament. She won additional gold medals at the Pan American Games in 1991 and 1995.

=== World Cups and World Championships ===
In 1985, Mireya won a silver medal with the Cuban team at the FIVB World Cup, where the Chinese led by Lang Ping won the gold. In that tournament, Mireya was named the "best attacker". In 1989, she won her first FIVB World Cup gold medal with Cuba, and was awarded as the "best spiker" and "most valuable player". She won additional gold medals at the 1991 and 1995 FIVB World Cup, being selected as the "best attacker" in both tournaments and the "most valuable player" in 1995.

Mireya led Cuba to the silver medal at the 1986 FIVB World Championship, and subsequently led Cuba to gold medals at the 1994 and 1998 FIVB World Championship.

=== Olympic Games ===
After a brief hiatus due to a knee injury that required surgery in 1990, Mireya resumed play and became a dominant force on the team. Mireya won her first Olympic gold medal in 1992 in Barcelona. She would win her second Olympic gold medal in 1996 in Atlanta. Although she contemplated retiring after winning her second Olympic gold medal, she continued playing for the national team. Mireya achieved her third Olympic gold medal in 2000 in Sydney, and soon after retired in 2001.

=== Mireya's vertical jump ===
Mireya was known for her spectacular jumping power, reaching 3.39 meters (11'1"), more than any other player, though being only 1.75 meters (5'9") tall.

== FIVB ==
In 2018, Mireya was unanimously elected to the position of executive vice president of the International Volleyball Federation (FIVB).

== Personal life ==
Mireya has a daughter, Idanaisi, and a grandson, Darío.

== Individual awards ==
- 1985 FIVB Volleyball Women's World Cup "Best Attacker"
- 1989 FIVB Volleyball Women's World Cup "Most Valuable Player"
- 1989 FIVB Volleyball Women's World Cup "Best Spiker"
- 1991 FIVB Volleyball Women's World Cup "Best Attacker"
- 1991 FIVB Volleyball Women's World Cup "Spirit of Fight"
- 1994 FIVB Volleyball Women's World Championship "Best Spiker"
- 1993 FIVB Volleyball World Grand Prix "Most Valuable Player"
- 1995 FIVB Volleyball Women's World Cup "Most Valuable Player"
- 1995 FIVB Volleyball Women's World Cup "Best Spiker"

Awards
Preceded by First Award	Most Valuable Player of FIVB World Grand Prix; 1993	Succeeded by (Brazil) Fernanda Venturini
Preceded by First Award	Best Spiker of FIVB World Grand Prix; 1993, 1994	Succeeded by (Cuba) Ana Fernández
Preceded by (Brazil) Ana Moser	Best Spiker of FIVB World Championship; 1994	Succeeded by (Cuba) Ana Fernandez
