= Sun Yue (volleyball) =

Chinese volleyball player (born 1973)

Personal information
- Born: 31 March 1973 (age 53); Nanjing, Jiangsu, China
- Height: 186 cm (6 ft 1 in)

Volleyball information
- Position: Outside hitter
- Number: 11

National team
1992–2000	China
Honours
Women's volleyball
Representing China
Olympic Games
Silver medal – second place	1996 Atlanta	Team
World Championship
Silver medal – second place	1998 Japan	Team
FIVB World Cup
Bronze medal – third place	1995 Japan	Team
World Grand Champions Cup
Silver medal – second place	1993 Japan
Asian Games
Gold medal – first place	1998 Bangkok	Team
Silver medal – second place	1994 Hiroshima	Team

Sun Yue (孙玥; born March 31, 1973) is a retired Chinese volleyball player who was predominantly an outside hitter. She was a member of the China women's national volleyball team that won the silver medal at the 1996 Summer Olympics in Atlanta.

== Career ==
Sun played the 1992 Barcelona Olympic Games placing seventh, the 1996 Atlanta Olympic Games winning the silver medal, and the 2000 Sydney Olympic Games finishing fifth. She finished in eighth place in the 1994 World Championship, and won the silver medal in the 1998 World Championship. Sun was bronze medalist in the 1995 World Cup, and ranked fifth in the 1999 edition.

== Awards ==
=== National team ===
==== Senior team ====
- 1995 World Cup - Bronze Medal
- 1996 Atlanta Olympic Games - Silver Medal
- 1998 World Championship - Silver Medal
