= 1999 FIVB Volleyball Women's World Cup =

Volleyball competition held in Japan

1999 Women's World Cup
Tournament details
- Host country: Japan
- Dates: 2–16 November
- Teams: 12
- Venue: (in 8 host cities)

Final positions
- Champions: Cuba (3rd title)
- Runners-up: Russia
- Third place: Brazil
- Fourth place: South Korea

Tournament awards
- MVP: (Cuba) Taismary Aguero
- Best Setter: (Russia) Elena Vassilevskaya
- Best OH: (Cuba) Yumilka Ruiz; (Russia) Yevgeniya Artamonova
- Best MB: (China) Wu Yongmei; (Cuba) Mirka Francia
- Best OPP: (Russia) Lioubov Sokolova

The 1999 FIVB Women's World Cup was held from 2 to 16 November 1999 in Japan. The winner received a fast lane ticket into the 2000 Summer Olympics.

Twelve women's national teams played at several venues across Japan. the teams were the hosts Japan, continental and vice-champions from Asia, Europe, NORCECA and South America, the African continental champion, and two wild-card teams created by the FIVB and the Japan Volleyball Association.

Teams played a 66-game single-round robin format match, in two groups (site A and site B).

== Teams ==
- Japan — Host
- Tunisia — African Champions
- China — Asian Champions
- Russia — European Champions
- Cuba — NORCECA Champions
- Brazil — South American Champions
- South Korea — Asian Vice-champions
- Croatia — European Vice-champions
- United States — NORCECA Vice-champions
- Argentina — South American Vice-champions
- Italy — Wild-card
- Peru — Wild-card

== Results ==
Pos	Team	Pld	W	L	Pts	SW	SL	SR	SPW	SPL	SPR
1	Cuba	11	11	0	22	33	5	6.600	944	729	1.295
2	Russia	11	10	1	21	30	9	3.333	930	766	1.214
3	Brazil	11	9	2	20	29	8	3.625	903	741	1.219
4	South Korea	11	7	4	18	24	14	1.714	851	771	1.104
5	China	11	7	4	18	24	15	1.600	888	819	1.084
6	Japan	11	7	4	18	22	18	1.222	888	845	1.051
7	Italy	11	5	6	16	19	21	0.905	883	833	1.060
8	Croatia	11	4	7	15	15	24	0.625	873	890	0.981
9	United States	11	3	8	14	17	26	0.654	895	952	0.940
10	Peru	11	2	9	13	11	28	0.393	827	929	0.890
11	Argentina	11	1	10	12	7	30	0.233	709	891	0.796
12	Tunisia	11	0	11	11	0	33	0.000	400	825	0.485

=== First round ===
==== Site A ====
Venue: Yoyogi National Gymnasium, Tokyo

Date	Time		Score		Set 1	Set 2	Set 3	Set 4	Set 5	Total
2 Nov	12:30	Russia	3–0	United States	25–20	25–17	25–19			75–56
2 Nov	15:00	Italy	0–3	South Korea	23–25	12–25	19–25			54–75
2 Nov	18:15	Japan	3–1	Argentina	23–25	25–15	25–13	25–19		98–72
3 Nov	12:30	South Korea	1–3	Russia	16–25	20–25	25–23	23–25		84–98
3 Nov	15:00	Italy	3–1	Argentina	22–25	25–14	25–19	25–9		97–67
3 Nov	18:15	United States	2–3	Japan	25–20	25–23	23–25	17–25	13–15	103–108
4 Nov	12:30	Argentina	0–3	United States	25–27	22–25	17–25			64–77
4 Nov	15:00	Russia	3–0	Italy	25–22	27–25	25–23			77–70
4 Nov	18:15	Japan	0–3	South Korea	17–25	19–25	19–25			55–75

==== Site B ====
Venue: Okayama General and Cultural Gymnasium, Okayama

Date	Time		Score		Set 1	Set 2	Set 3	Set 4	Set 5	Total
2 Nov	12:30	Brazil	3–0	Croatia	25–21	25–16	25–22			75–59
2 Nov	15:00	Cuba	3–0	Tunisia	25–13	25–8	25–8			75–29
2 Nov	18:15	China	3–1	Peru	27–29	25–15	25–20	25–18		102–82
3 Nov	13:30	Brazil	3–0	Peru	25–17	25–15	25–16			75–48
3 Nov	16:00	Tunisia	0–3	Croatia	7–25	15–25	10–25			32–75
3 Nov	18:35	Cuba	3–1	China	27–25	25–18	21–25	25–21		98–89
4 Nov	13:30	Brazil	0–3	Cuba	27–29	21–25	14–25			62–79
4 Nov	16:00	Croatia	3–1	Peru	25–18	25–21	22–25	25–23		97–87
4 Nov	18:35	China	3–0	Tunisia	25–9	25–12	25–17			75–38

=== Second round ===
==== Site A ====
Venue: Hokkaido Prefectural Sports Center, Sapporo

Date	Time		Score		Set 1	Set 2	Set 3	Set 4	Set 5	Total
6 Nov	12:30	South Korea	3–2	United States	16–25	25–13	25–21	24–26	18–16	108–101
6 Nov	15:00	Russia	3–1	Argentina	25–12	25–19	31–33	25–14		106–78
6 Nov	18:15	Japan	3–2	Italy	18–25	25–16	25–23	21–25	15–11	104–100
7 Nov	12:30	South Korea	3–0	Argentina	25–19	25–20	25–21			75–60
7 Nov	15:00	Italy	3–0	United States	25–21	25–21	25–19			75–61
7 Nov	18:15	Russia	3–1	Japan	25–15	25–22	23–25	25–18		98–80

==== Site B ====
Venue: Toyama City Gymnasium, Toyama

Date	Time		Score		Set 1	Set 2	Set 3	Set 4	Set 5	Total
6 Nov	13:30	Brazil	3–1	China	23–25	25–16	25–22	25–23		98–86
6 Nov	16:00	Peru	3–0	Tunisia	25–17	25–11	25–15			75–43
6 Nov	18:35	Cuba	3–1	Croatia	25–20	25–19	21–25	28–26		99–90
7 Nov	13:30	Brazil	3–0	Tunisia	25–10	25–14	25–16			75–40
7 Nov	16:00	Cuba	3–0	Peru	25–19	25–23	25–18			75–60
7 Nov	18:35	China	3–0	Croatia	25–22	27–25	26–24			78–71

=== Third round ===
==== Site A ====
Venue: Sendai City Gymnasium, Sendai

Date	Time		Score		Set 1	Set 2	Set 3	Set 4	Set 5	Total
10 Nov	12:30	Russia	3–0	Peru	25–19	25–17	25–21			75–57
10 Nov	15:00	Italy	3–0	Tunisia	25–11	25–13	25–3			75–27
10 Nov	18:15	Japan	3–1	Croatia	27–25	25–19	34–36	25–22		111–102
11 Nov	12:30	Russia	3–0	Tunisia	25–13	25–18	25–12			75–43
11 Nov	15:00	Italy	3–1	Croatia	25–23	25–19	18–25	25–23		93–90
11 Nov	18:15	Japan	3–0	Peru	25–22	25–19	25–13			75–54
12 Nov	12:30	Russia	3–0	Croatia	25–22	25–10	25–17			75–49
12 Nov	15:00	Italy	3–1	Peru	25–17	25–14	23–25	25–15		98–71
12 Nov	18:15	Japan	3–0	Tunisia	25–10	25–12	25–12			75–34

==== Site B ====
Venue: Synthesis Gymnasium, Kanazawa

Date	Time		Score		Set 1	Set 2	Set 3	Set 4	Set 5	Total
10 Nov	12:30	Brazil	3–0	Argentina	25–22	25–15	25–17			75–54
10 Nov	15:00	Cuba	3–1	South Korea	19–25	35–33	25–19	25–15		104–92
10 Nov	18:15	China	3–0	United States	29–27	25–23	25–18			79–68
11 Nov	13:30	Brazil	3–1	United States	25–19	20–25	25–15	25–14		95–73
11 Nov	16:00	Cuba	3–0	Argentina	25–14	25–18	25–14			75–46
11 Nov	18:35	China	3–1	South Korea	25–23	25–22	16–25	25–17		75–61
12 Nov	13:30	Brazil	3–0	South Korea	25–21	25–23	25–12			75–56
12 Nov	16:00	Cuba	3–1	United States	25–12	26–24	21–25	25–13		97–74
12 Nov	18:35	China	3–0	Argentina	25–17	25–15	25–16			75–48

=== Fourth round ===
==== Site A ====
Venue: Nagoya Rainbow Hall, Nagoya

Date	Time		Score		Set 1	Set 2	Set 3	Set 4	Set 5	Total
14 Nov	12:30	Brazil	3–0	Italy	25–22	25–12	25–17			75–51
14 Nov	15:00	Russia	3–1	China	25–23	15–25	25–13	25–17		90–78
14 Nov	18:15	Cuba	3–0	Japan	25–23	25–14	25–17			75–54
15 Nov	12:30	Russia	3–2	Brazil	21–25	25–20	25–17	22–25	15–9	108–96
15 Nov	15:00	Cuba	3–1	Italy	25–17	25–21	17–25	25–17		92–80
15 Nov	18:15	Japan	3–0	China	25–17	25–22	25–18			75–57
16 Nov	12:30	Cuba	3–0	Russia	25–19	25–15	25–19			75–53
16 Nov	15:00	China	3–1	Italy	25–20	26–24	18–25	25–21		94–90
16 Nov	18:15	Brazil	3–0	Japan	25–22	25–11	25–20			75–53

==== Site B ====
Venue: Osaka Prefectural Gymnasium, Osaka

Date	Time		Score		Set 1	Set 2	Set 3	Set 4	Set 5	Total
14 Nov	12:30	United States	3–2	Peru	22–25	25–22	29–27	17–25	15–12	108–111
14 Nov	15:00	Argentina	3–0	Tunisia	25–9	25–23	25–11			75–43
14 Nov	18:15	South Korea	3–0	Croatia	25–20	25–20	25–22			75–62
15 Nov	13:30	Croatia	3–2	United States	19–25	19–25	25–21	25–20	15–8	103–99
15 Nov	16:00	Peru	3–1	Argentina	20–25	25–16	25–18	25–20		95–79
15 Nov	18:35	South Korea	3–0	Tunisia	25–8	25–14	25–12			75–34
16 Nov	13:30	United States	3–0	Tunisia	25–13	25–11	25–13			75–37
16 Nov	16:00	Croatia	3–0	Argentina	25–22	25–22	25–22			75–66
16 Nov	18:35	South Korea	3–0	Peru	25–18	25–20	25–15			75–53

== Final standing ==
Rank	Team
1st place, gold medalist(s)	Cuba
2nd place, silver medalist(s)	Russia
3rd place, bronze medalist(s)	Brazil
4	South Korea
5	China
6	Japan
7	Italy
8	Croatia
9	United States
10	Peru
11	Argentina
12	Tunisia

Qualified for the 2000 Summer Olympics

1999 Women's World Cup champions

Cuba
4th title

Team roster
Taismary Agüero, Azurima Álvarez, Regla Bell, Marlenis Costa, Mirka Francia, Lilia Izquierdo, Enia Martínez, Liana Mesa, Yoselín Roque Palacios, Yumilka Ruíz, Martha Sánchez, Ana Fernández
Head coach
Antonio Perdomo

== Awards ==
- Most valuable player
  (Cuba) Taismary Agüero
- Best scorer
  (Croatia) Barbara Jelić
- Best spiker
  (Russia) Lioubov Sokolova
- Best server
  (Cuba) Taismary Agüero
- Best receiver
  (Russia) Lioubov Sokolova
- Best digger
  (Japan) Hiroko Tsukumo
- Best blocker
  (Cuba) Mirka Francia
- Best setter
  (Cuba) Taismary Agüero
- Best Outside Hitters
  (Cuba) Yumilka Ruiz
  (Russia) Yevgeniya Artamonova
- Best Middle blockers
  (Cuba) Mirka Francia
  (Russia) Elizaveta Tichtchenko
- Best Opposite
  (Russia) Lioubov Sokolova

== Statistics leaders ==
Best scorers

Rank	Name	Points
1	(Croatia) JELIC Barbara	217
2	(China) WU Yongmei	188
3	(Russia) ARTAMONOVA Evguenia	175
4	(Russia) GODINA Elena	162
5	(Italy) PICCININI Francesca	158
6	(Cuba) FERNANDEZ Ana Ibis	149
7	(United States) SCOTT Danielle	137
8	(South Korea) CHANG So Hyun	133
9	(Russia) SOKOLOVA Liubov	127
10	(Brazil) DIAS Virna	118
11	(Brazil) MOSER Ana	109
12	(Cuba) RUIZ Yumilka	105
13	(China) SUN Yue	98
14	(Brazil) BARROS Leila	97
15	(Japan) SASAKI Miki	93

Best spikers

Rank	Name	%Eff
1	(Russia) SOKOLOVA Liubov	39.36
2	(Russia) GODINA Elena	36.43
3	(Cuba) FERNANDEZ Ana Ibis	35.27
4	(Russia) TICHTCHENKO Elizaveta	33.18
5	(Cuba) RUIZ Yumilka	32.79

Best blockers

Rank	Name	Avg
1	(Cuba) FRANCIA Mirka	1.12
2	(China) WU Yongmei	1.10
3	(United States) SCOTT Danielle	1.05
4	(Cuba) FERNANDEZ Ana Ibis	0.97
5	(South Korea) CHANG So Hyun	0.92

Best servers

Rank	Name	Avg
1	(Cuba) AGUERO Taismary	0.36
2	(Russia) SOKOLOVA Liubov	0.35
3	(Brazil) MOSER Ana	0.32

Best receivers

Rank	Name	%Succ
1	(Russia) SOKOLOVA Liubov	68.35
2	(China) CHENG Jin	66.27
3	(Japan) ETO Naomi	64.32

Best diggers

Rank	Name	Avg
1	(Japan) TSUKOMO Hiroko	3.17
2	(China) WANG Lina	2.69
3	(Italy) MARINELLIM Evelyn	2.54

Best setters

Rank	Name	Avg
1	(Cuba) AGUERO Taismary	10.91
2	(Italy) CACCIATORI Maurizia	10.36
3	(China) HE Qi	9.91
4	(Brazil) SOUZA Helia	9.72
5	(Russia) VASSILEVSKAYA Elena	9.13
6	(United States) SANTOS Robyn Ah Mow	7.67
7	(Peru) GARCIA Rosa	6.37
8	(South Korea) KANG Hye Mi	5.32
