= 1995 FIVB Volleyball Women's World Cup =

Volleyball tournament in Japan

1995 Women's World Cup
Tournament details
- Host country: Japan
- Dates: 3–17 November
- Teams: 12
- Venue: (in 4 host cities)

Final positions
- Champions: Cuba (3rd title)
- Runners-up: Brazil
- Third place: China
- Fourth place: Croatia

Tournament awards
- MVP: (Cuba) Mireya Luis
- Best Setter: (Brazil) Fernanda Venturini
- Best OH: (Cuba) Mireya Luis; (Croatia) Barbara Jelic
- Best MB: (China) Wang Yi; (Cuba) Magalys Carvajal
- Best OPP: (Japan) Motoko Obayashi

The 1995 FIVB Women's World Cup was a volleyball tournament held from 3 to 17 November 1995 in Japan. Twelve national teams played in cities all over Japan for the right to a fast lane ticket into the 1996 Summer Olympics in Atlanta, US.

== Teams ==
- Japan — Host
- Kenya — African Champions
- China — Asian Champions
- Netherlands — European Champions
- Cuba — NORCECA Champions
- Brazil — South American Champions
- South Korea — Asian Vice-champions
- Croatia — European Vice-champions
- United States — NORCECA Vice-champions
- Peru — South American Vice-champions
- Canada — Wild-card
- Egypt — Wild-card

== Results ==
Pos	Team	Pld	W	L	Pts	SW	SL	SR	SPW	SPL	SPR
1	Cuba	11	11	0	22	33	3	11.000	527	292	1.805
2	Brazil	11	10	1	21	30	4	7.500	498	249	2.000
3	China	11	8	3	19	24	14	1.714	498	351	1.419
4	Croatia	11	7	4	18	27	15	1.800	527	427	1.234
5	South Korea	11	6	5	17	24	16	1.500	515	395	1.304
6	Japan	11	6	5	17	22	16	1.375	460	378	1.217
7	United States	11	6	5	17	19	18	1.056	464	402	1.154
8	Netherlands	11	6	5	17	19	19	1.000	459	416	1.103
9	Canada	11	3	8	14	11	24	0.458	310	438	0.708
10	Peru	11	2	9	13	7	27	0.259	242	471	0.514
11	Kenya	11	1	10	12	3	30	0.100	150	464	0.323
12	Egypt	11	0	11	11	0	33	0.000	128	495	0.259

=== First round ===
==== Site A ====
Location: Tokyo

Date	Time		Score		Set 1	Set 2	Set 3	Set 4	Set 5	Total
3 Nov	13:30	Peru	3–0	Egypt	15–13	15–10	15–8			45–31
3 Nov	15:30	China	3–0	Netherlands	15–7	16–14	16–14			47–35
3 Nov	19:00	Japan	3–0	Canada	15–8	15–2	15–3			45–13
4 Nov	14:00	China	3–0	Egypt	15–6	15–3	15–1			45–10
4 Nov	16:00	Netherlands	3–0	Canada	15–11	15–9	15–10			45–30
4 Nov	18:30	Japan	3–0	Peru	15–8	15–7	15–9			45–24
5 Nov	13:30	Netherlands	3–0	Egypt	15–3	15–2	15–4			45–9
5 Nov	15:30	Canada	3–0	Peru	15–12	15–12	15–10			45–34
5 Nov	18:00	China	3–2	Japan	8–15	11–15	15–10	15–4	15–12	64–56

==== Site B ====
Location: Matsumoto

Date	Time		Score		Set 1	Set 2	Set 3	Set 4	Set 5	Total
3 Nov	12:30	Cuba	3–0	Kenya	15–4	15–6	15–2			45–12
3 Nov	14:00	South Korea	3–1	United States	10–15	15–13	15–12	15–10		55–50
3 Nov	17:00	Brazil	3–0	Croatia	15–8	15–7	15–1			45–16
4 Nov	12:00	South Korea	3–0	Kenya	15–5	15–2	15–3			45–10
4 Nov	13:30	Cuba	3–0	Brazil	15–8	15–13	15–9			45–30
4 Nov	16:30	Croatia	3–0	United States	16–14	15–10	15–13			46–37
5 Nov	12:30	Brazil	3–0	Kenya	15–0	15–6	15–4			45–10
5 Nov	14:00	Cuba	3–0	United States	15–6	15–6	15–8			45–20
5 Nov	17:00	Croatia	3–1	South Korea	13–15	17–16?	15–12	15–8		60–51?

=== Second round ===
==== Site A ====
Location: Fukuoka

Date	Time		Score		Set 1	Set 2	Set 3	Set 4	Set 5	Total
7 Nov	13:00	Canada	3–0	Egypt	15–1	15–3	15–11			45–15
7 Nov	15:30	China	3–0	Peru	15–6	15–1	15–1			45–8
7 Nov	18:00	Japan	3–1	Netherlands	15–10	15–13	8–15	15–9		53–47
8 Nov	13:30	China	3–0	Canada	15–4	15–9	15–3			45–16
8 Nov	16:00	Netherlands	3–0	Peru	15–9	15–3	15–8			45–20
8 Nov	18:30	Japan	3–0	Egypt	15–1	15–0	15–1			45–2

==== Site B ====
Location: Fukui

Date	Time		Score		Set 1	Set 2	Set 3	Set 4	Set 5	Total
7 Nov	13:00	Croatia	3–0	Kenya	15–4	15–2	15–3			45–9
7 Nov	15:00	Brazil	3–0	United States	15–6	15–5	17–16			47–27
7 Nov	18:00	Cuba	3–1	South Korea	10–15	15–13	15–9	15–7		55–44
8 Nov	13:00	United States	3–0	Kenya	15–2	15–2	15–8			45–12
8 Nov	15:00	Brazil	3–1	South Korea	15–12	15–12	14–16	15–9		59–49
8 Nov	18:00	Cuba	3–2	Croatia	11–15	16–14	10–15	15–9	15–7	67–60

=== Third round ===
==== Site A ====
Location: Nagoya

Date	Time		Score		Set 1	Set 2	Set 3	Set 4	Set 5	Total
11 Nov	12:30	South Korea	3–0	Peru	15–0	15–3	15–1			45–4
11 Nov	15:30	Cuba	3–0	Egypt	15–2	15–5	15–9			45–16
11 Nov	18:00	Japan	3–0	Kenya	15–1	15–3	15–3			45–7
12 Nov	13:30	United States	3–0	Egypt	15–3	15–2	15–1			45–6
12 Nov	15:30	Cuba	3–0	Canada	15–6	15–4	15–10			45–20
12 Nov	18:00	Croatia	3–2	Japan	9–15	15–5	15–8	5–15	15–12	59–55
13 Nov	13:30	Brazil	3–0	Egypt	15–3	15–2	15–1			45–6
13 Nov	15:00	Cuba	3–0	Netherlands	15–7	15–7	15–9			45–23
13 Nov	18:00	South Korea	3–0	Japan	15–2	15–8	15–6			45–16

==== Site B ====
Location: Okazaki

Date	Time		Score		Set 1	Set 2	Set 3	Set 4	Set 5	Total
11 Nov	12:00	China	3–2	Croatia	7–15	10–15	15–9	15–3	15–9	62–51
11 Nov	15:00	United States	3–0	Netherlands	16–14	15–7	15–6			46–27
11 Nov	18:00	Brazil	3–0	Canada	15–0	15–5	15–8			45–13
12 Nov	12:00	China	3–1	South Korea	15–9	15–3	10–15	15–6		55–33
12 Nov	15:00	Brazil	3–0	Netherlands	15–6	15–7	15–8			45–21
12 Nov	18:00	Peru	3–0	Kenya	15–10	15–4	15–7			45–21
13 Nov	12:00	United States	3–2	Canada	5–15	15–4	13–15	15–7	15–8	63–49
13 Nov	15:00	China	3–0	Kenya	15–2	15–0	15–3			45–5
13 Nov	17:30	Croatia	3–0	Peru	15–3	15–4	15–1			45–8

=== Fourth round ===
==== Site A ====
Location: Osaka

Date	Time		Score		Set 1	Set 2	Set 3	Set 4	Set 5	Total
15 Nov	13:00	Croatia	3–0	Canada	15–8	15–5	15–6			45–19
15 Nov	15:30	South Korea	3–0	Egypt	15–4	15–5	15–5			45–14
15 Nov	18:15	Japan	3–0	United States	15–11	15–8	15–8			45–27
16 Nov	13:00	Cuba	3–0	China	15–11	15–11	15–5			45–27
16 Nov	15:30	Kenya	3–0	Egypt	15–5	15–4	15–5			45–14
16 Nov	18:15	Brazil	3–0	Japan	15–7	15–12	15–5			45–24
17 Nov	13:00	Netherlands	3–2	South Korea	6–15	15–8	15–11	6–15	15–9	57–58
17 Nov	15:30	Brazil	3–0	Peru	15–5	15–2	15–0			45–7
17 Nov	18:15	Cuba	3–0	Japan	15–11	15–8	15–12			45–31

==== Site B ====
Location: Kobe

Date	Time		Score		Set 1	Set 2	Set 3	Set 4	Set 5	Total
15 Nov	12:30	Cuba	3–0	Peru	15–0	15–7	15–2			45–9
15 Nov	15:00	Brazil	3–0	China	15–6	17–16	15–9			47–31
15 Nov	18:00	Netherlands	3–0	Kenya	15–1	15–7	15–0			45–8
16 Nov	13:00	South Korea	3–0	Canada	15–4	15–5	15–6			45–15
16 Nov	15:30	Netherlands	3–2	Croatia	15–4	11–15	15–9	13–15	15–12	69–55
16 Nov	18:00	United States	3–1	Peru	15–5	14–16	15–10	15–7		59–38
17 Nov	13:00	Croatia	3–0	Egypt	15–3	15–1	15–1			45–5
17 Nov	15:30	United States	3–0	China	15–9	15–12	15–11			45–32
17 Nov	18:00	Canada	3–0	Kenya	15–6	15–1	15–4			45–11

== Final standing ==
Rank	Team
1st place, gold medalist(s)	Cuba
2nd place, silver medalist(s)	Brazil
3rd place, bronze medalist(s)	China
4	Croatia
5	South Korea
6	Japan
7	United States
8	Netherlands
9	Canada
10	Peru
11	Kenya
12	Egypt

Qualified for the 1996 Summer Olympics

1995 Women's World Cup champions

Cuba
3rd title

Team roster
Marlenis Costa, Mireya Luis, Lilia Izquierdo, Idalmis Gato, Raisa O'Farrill, Regla Bell, Regla Torres, Taismary Agüero, Ana Ibis Fernandez, Magaly Carvajal, Mirka Francia, Marta Sánchez
Head coach
Eugenio George Lafita

== Awards ==
- Most valuable player
  Mireya Luis (CUB)
- Best scorer
  Ana Moser (BRA)
- Best spiker
  Mireya Luis (CUB)
- Best server
  Elles Leferink (NED)
- Best blocker
  Jerine Fleurke (NED)
- Best digger
  Marlenis Costa (CUB)
- Best setter
  Fernanda Venturini (BRA)
- Best receiver
  Nataša Osmokrović (CRO)

== Statistics leaders ==
Best scorers

Rank	Name	Points
1	(Brazil) Ana Moser	205
2	(Croatia) Barbara Jelic	198
3	(Cuba) Mireya Luis	186
4	(United States) Tara Cross Battle	151
5	(Netherlands) Cintha Boersma	138
6	(China) Sun Yue	132
7	(Cuba) Regla Torres	129
8	(Cuba) Regla Bell	116
9	(Brazil) Marcia Fu	109
10	(Japan) Motoko Obayashi	102

Best attackers

Rank	Name	%Eff
1	(Cuba) Mireya Luis	55.76
2	(Cuba) Regla Bell	53.21
3	(Cuba) Magaly Carvajal	50.81
4	(Japan) Tomoko Yoshihara	49.42
5	(Brazil) Marcia Cunha	48.13
6	(China) Wu Yong Mei	46.33
7	(Croatia) Barbara Jelic	45.82
8	(Netherlands) Elles Leferink	45.78
9	(Brazil) Ana Moser	45.02
10	(United States) Tara Cross-Battle	43.57

Best blockers

Rank	Name	Avg
1	(Netherlands) Jerine Fleurke	1.57
2	(Cuba) Magalys Carvajal	1.37
3	(China) Lai Yawen	1.04
4	(Cuba) Regla Torres	0.95
5	(South Korea) Chang So-Yun	0.92

Best servers

Rank	Name	Avg
1	(Netherlands) Elles Leferink	0.52
2	(China) Sun Yue	0.47
3	(Peru) Milagros Moy Alvarado	0.42
4	(Croatia) Barbara Jelic	0.38
5	(Japan) Mika Saiki	0.34

Best diggers

Rank	Name	Avg
1	(Cuba) Marlenis Costa	4.04
2	(Japan) Mika Saiki	3.85
3	(China) Lai Yawen	3.73
4	(Japan) Motoko Obayashi	3.28
5	(China) Li Yan	2.98

Best setters

Rank	Name	Avg
1	(Brazil) Fernanda Venturini	11.35
2	(Netherlands) Riette Fledderus	9.86
3	(United States) Lori Endicott	8.36
4	(China) He Qi	8.02
5	(Japan) Aki Nagatomi	7.33

Best receivers

Rank	Name	%Succ
1	(Croatia) Natasa Osmokrovic	74.15
2	(Netherlands) Cintha Boersma	73.47
3	(Netherlands) Erna Brinkman	67.52
4	(Peru) Milagros Moy Alvarado	64.56
5	(Brazil) Marcia Cunha	63.16
