= 1996 FIVB Volleyball World Grand Prix =

International women's volleyball tournament

1996 FIVB World Grand Prix
Tournament details
- Host country: China (Group 1 Final)
- Dates: 27–29 September
- Teams: 8
- Venue: 1 (in 1 host city)

Final positions
- Champions: Brazil (2nd title)

Tournament awards
- MVP: (Brazil) Leila Barros
- Best Setter: (Brazil) Fernanda Venturini
- Best OH: (China) Sun Yue; (Brazil) Virna Dias
- Best MB: (Cuba) Regla Torres; (China) Lai Yawen
- Best OPP: (Brazil) Leila Barros

The 1996 FIVB World Grand Prix was the fourth women's volleyball tournament of its kind. It was held over four weeks in eight cities throughout Asia, cumulating with the final round in Shanghai, PR China, from 27 to 29 September 1996.

== Preliminary round ==
=== Ranking ===
The host China and top three teams in the preliminary round advance to the final round.

Pos	Team	Pld	W	L	Pts	SW	SL	SR	SPW	SPL	SPR	Qualification
1	Cuba	12	11	1	23	33	6	5.500	542	386	1.404	Final round
2	Brazil	12	9	3	21	30	16	1.875	607	518	1.172	Final round
3	China (Note: Qualified as hosts) (H)	12	8	4	20	28	20	1.400	632	538	1.175	Final round
4	Russia	12	7	5	19	26	19	1.368	586	553	1.060	Final round
5	United States	12	7	5	19	28	24	1.167	659	626	1.053	
6	South Korea	12	3	9	15	15	28	0.536	511	576	0.887	
7	Netherlands	12	2	10	14	9	32	0.281	391	594	0.658	
8	Japan	12	1	11	13	11	35	0.314	487	624	0.780	

(H) Host

=== First round ===
==== Group A ====
- Venue: Sendai, Japan

Date		Score		Set 1	Set 2	Set 3	Set 4	Set 5	Total
30 Ago	China	3–0	Cuba	15–13	15–8	15–12			45–33
30 Ago	Russia	3–1	Japan	10–15	15–12	15–9	15–11		55–47
31 Ago	China	3–2	Japan	10–15	15–12	15–10	9–15	15–11	64–63
31 Ago	Cuba	3–1	Russia	5–15	15–11	15–10	15–12		50–48
1 Sep	Russia	3–1	China	15–13	3–15	15–9	15–12		48–49
1 Sep	Cuba	3–1	Japan	15–11	12–15	15–8	15–13		57–47

==== Group B ====
- Venue: Jakarta, Indonesia

Date		Score		Set 1	Set 2	Set 3	Set 4	Set 5	Total
30 Ago	Netherlands	3–2	United States	16–17	15–9	5–15	15–13	15–9	66–63
30 Ago	Brazil	3–0	South Korea	17–16	16–14	15–7			48–37
31 Ago	United States	3–2	South Korea	10–15	9–15	15–12	15–11	15–12	64–65
31 Ago	Brazil	3–0	Netherlands	15–9	15–13	15–7			45–29
1 Sep	South Korea	3–1	Netherlands	15–9	15–10	13–15	15–4		58–38
1 Sep	Brazil	3–2	United States	15–5	11–15	9–15	15–9	15–12	65–56

=== Second round ===
==== Group C ====
- Venue: Osaka, Japan

Date		Score		Set 1	Set 2	Set 3	Set 4	Set 5	Total
6 Sep	United States	3–2	Brazil	15–8	10–15	5–15	15–7	15–9	60–54
6 Sep	Russia	3–0	Japan	15–6	15–5	15–11			45–22
7 Sep	Brazil	3–2	Japan	15–2	7–15	15–9	15–17	15–8	67–51
7 Sep	United States	3–0	Russia	15–10	15–13	15–13			45–36
8 Sep	United States	3–1	Japan	15–9	9–15	15–4	15–7		54–35
8 Sep	Brazil	3–1	Russia	16–14	14–16	15–5	15–13		60–48

==== Group D ====
- Venue: Beijing, China

Date		Score		Set 1	Set 2	Set 3	Set 4	Set 5	Total
6 Sep	Cuba	3–0	South Korea	16–14	15–12	15–3			46–29
6 Sep	China	3–0	Netherlands	15–2	15–5	15–7			45–14
7 Sep	Cuba	3–0	Netherlands	15–5	15–7	15–4			45–16
7 Sep	China	3–2	South Korea	14–16	15–7	13–15	15–9	15–9	72–56
8 Sep	South Korea	3–0	Netherlands	15–11	15–6	17–16			47–33
8 Sep	Cuba	3–0	China	15–3	15–10	15–10			45–23

=== Third round ===
==== Group E ====
- Venue: Honolulu, United States

Date		Score		Set 1	Set 2	Set 3	Set 4	Set 5	Total
12 Sep	Cuba	3–1	Japan	15–3	15–13	7–15	15–8		40–32
12 Sep	United States	3–1	Netherlands	13–15	15–0	15–12	15–9		58–36
14 Sep	Cuba	3–0	Netherlands	15–9	15–10	15–5			45–24
14 Sep	Japan	3–2	United States	15–9	6–15	10–15	16–14	15–8	62–61
15 Sep	Netherlands	3–0	Japan	15–12	15–13	16–14			46–39
15 Sep	Cuba	3–0	United States	15–10	15–13	15–4			45–27

==== Group F ====
- Venue: Macau

Date		Score		Set 1	Set 2	Set 3	Set 4	Set 5	Total
13 Sep	Brazil	3–1	Russia	14–16	15–10	15–7	15–12		59–45
13 Sep	China	3–1	South Korea	15–6	16–14	11–15	15–5		57–40
14 Sep	Brazil	3–0	South Korea	15–2	15–12	15–5			45–19
14 Sep	China	3–2	Russia	15–2	15–8	13–15	13–15	15–11	71–51
15 Sep	Russia	3–0	South Korea	17–15	15–12	15–10			47–37
15 Sep	China	3–1	Brazil	15–7	14–16	15–7	15–12		59–42

=== Fourth round ===
==== Group G ====
- Venue: Taipei, Taiwan

Date		Score		Set 1	Set 2	Set 3	Set 4	Set 5	Total
20 Sep	Cuba	3–0	South Korea	15–13	15–12	15–10			45–35
20 Sep	Brazil	3–0	Japan	15–7	15–8	15–10			45–25
21 Sep	Brazil	3–1	South Korea	15–8	8–15	15–8	15–12		53–43
21 Sep	Cuba	3–0	Japan	15–13	15–11	15–12			45–36
22 Sep	South Korea	3–0	Japan	15–3	15–12	15–13			45–28
22 Sep	Cuba	3–0	Brazil	15–2	15–8	16–14			46–24

==== Group H ====
- Venue: Hong Kong

Date		Score		Set 1	Set 2	Set 3	Set 4	Set 5	Total
19 Sep	Russia	3–1	United States	15–13	12–15	15–6	15–10		57–44
19 Sep	China	3–0	Netherlands	15–7	15–4	15–6			45–17
20 Sep	United States	3–1	Netherlands	15–8	15–4	14–16	15–10		59–38
20 Sep	Russia	3–1	China	15–8	15–9	16–17	15–1		61–35
21 Sep	Russia	3–0	Netherlands	15–12	15–12	15–10			45–34
21 Sep	United States	3–2	China	15–11	11–15	16–14	11–15	15–12	68–67

== Final round ==
- Venue: Shanghai, China

Date		Score		Set 1	Set 2	Set 3	Set 4	Set 5	Total
27 Sep	Brazil	3–2	Cuba	15–7	15–9	9–15	7–15	15–10	61–56
27 Sep	Russia	3–0	China	15–5	15–12	15–7			45–24
28 Sep	Cuba	3–2	Russia	13–15	8–15	15–9	15–6	17–15	68–60
28 Sep	Brazil	3–2	China	13–15	15–11	15–5	15–17	15–9	73–57
29 Sep	Brazil	3–2	Russia	13–15	12–15	15–6	15–2	16–14	71–52
29 Sep	Cuba	3–1	China	15–5	15–8	6–15	15–13		51–41

=== Final ranking ===
Pos	Team	Pld	W	L	Pts	SW	SL	SR	SPW	SPL	SPR
1	Brazil	3	3	0	6	9	6	1.500	205	165	1.242
2	Cuba	3	2	1	5	8	6	1.333	175	162	1.080
3	Russia	3	1	2	4	7	6	1.167	157	163	0.963
4	China	3	0	3	3	3	9	0.333	122	169	0.722

== Final standings ==
Place	Team
1st place, gold medalist(s)	Brazil
2nd place, silver medalist(s)	Cuba
3rd place, bronze medalist(s)	Russia
4	China
5	United States
6	South Korea
7	Netherlands
8	Japan

1996 FIVB World Grand Prix winners

Brazil
Second title

Team roster
Leila Barros, Ana Moser, Fernanda Venturini, Fofão, Virna Dias, Ana Paula Connelly, Karin Rodrigues, Filó, Sandra Suruagy, Hilma Caldeira, Fernanda Doval and Ana Flavia Sanglard.
Head coach
Bernardo Rezende

== Individual awards ==
- Most valuable player:
  - Leila Barros (BRA)
- Best scorer:
  - Sun Yue (CHN)
- Best spiker:
  - Leila Barros (BRA)
- Best blocker:
  - Regla Torres (CUB)
- Best server:
  - Virna Dias (BRA)
- Best receiver:
  - Regla Bell (CUB)
- Best setter:
  - Fernanda Venturini (BRA)
- Best Outside Hitters:
  - Virna Dias (BRA)
  - Sun Yue (CHN)
- Best Middle Blockers:
  - Regla Torres (CUB)
  - Lai Yawen (CHN)
- Best Opposite:
  - Leila Barros (BRA)

== Statistics leaders ==
- Only players whose teams advanced to the final four are ranked.

Best scorers

Rank	Name	Points
1	(China) SUN Yue	119
2	(Russia) Evguenia ARTAMONOVA	113
3	(Brazil) Virna Dias	103
4	(Cuba) Regla Bell	100
5	(Brazil) Leila Barros	94
6	(China) LI Yan	92
7	(Cuba) Regla Torres	91
8	(Russia) Elena Godina	87
9	(Russia) Elizabeta Titchenko	82
10	(Brazil) Ana Paula Connelly	79

Best spikers

Rank	Name	%Eff
1	(Brazil) Leila Barros	38.45
2	(Russia) Evguenia Artamonova	37.34
3	(Brazil) Virna Dias	35.43
4	(China) Sun Yue	33.23
5	(Cuba) Regla Torres	32.12

Best blockers

Rank	Name	Avg
1	(Brazil) Ana Paula Connelly	1.19
2	(Cuba) Regla Torres	1.06
3	(Russia) Lai Yawen	0.98
4	(China) Li Yan	0.90
5	(Cuba) Ana Ibis Fernandez	0.88

Best servers

Rank	Name	Avg
1	(Brazil) DIAS Virna	0.47
2	(Russia) BATUKHTINA Elena	0.44
3	(Russia) ARTAMONOVA Evguenia	0.39
4	(Cuba) BELL Regla	0.33
5	(China) WANG Zilling	0.31

Best diggers

Rank	Name	Avg
1	(China) SUN Yue	3.43
2	(China) LAI Yawen	3.11
3	(Brazil) BARROS Leila	2.76

Best receivers

Rank	Name	%Succ
1	(Cuba) BELL Regla	74.16
2	(Brazil) SANGLARD Ana Flavia	71.15
3	(China) LI Yan	67.67

Best setters

Rank	Name	Avg	%Succ
1	(Brazil) VENTURINI Fernanda	10.62	68.76
2	(China) HE Qi	9.98	51.89
3	(Russia) NIKULINA Marina	8.23	45.42
4	(Cuba) COSTA Marlenis	6.76	55.43
5	(Russia) GRATCHEVA Tatianna	5.11	43.43
