= FIVB Volleyball World Grand Prix =

International volleyball tournament

- Sport: Volleyball
- Founded: 1993
- Folded: 2017
- Replaced by: Nations League; Challenger Cup
- No. of teams: 12 in Group 1; 12 in Group 2; 8 in Group 3
- Continent: International (FIVB)
- Last champion: Brazil (12th title)
- Most titles: Brazil (12 titles)

The FIVB Volleyball World Grand Prix was an annual women's volleyball competition created in 1993. The men's version of the competition was called World League. This event should not be confused with the other international volleyball competitions, the World Championship, the World Cup and the World Grand Champions Cup.

From 2018, the World Grand Prix was replaced by the FIVB Volleyball Women's Nations League and Challenger Cup.

== History ==
=== Origins ===
Old FIVB World Grand Prix logo

World Grand Prix was created in 1993 as part of the FIVB's marketing strategy to promote the sport of volleyball by establishing annual international competitions. It was modelled after the World League, a successful event for men that had been introduced three years before.

The Grand Prix made women's volleyball very popular in East Asia. As of 2004, the competition was maintained mainly with the support of Asian investors. The early competitions and the finals were usually held in East Asia, because the volleyball market in East Asia is large and has a large audience (such as Hong Kong). Later, some competitions were held in Europe and the United States, for example, the 2003 finals was held for the first time in Italy, and 2015 finals was held in the United States.

The budget for prize money grew steadily since 1993, but at a rather slow pace. The figures have reached $1.295 million in 2004 - meager when compared to the World League's $13 million.

Although the status of the Grand Prix was less than the other three international competitions, the prize money and popularity was far better. Because it is purely commercial competition, the winner of the Grand Prix championship is generally not considered a world champion. But the Grand Prix has created stars for female volleyball players, and thus contributed to the promotion of the sport of female volleyball in the world.

The predominance of Asian sponsors determined the first major break with the World League's formula. Most of the cities that host preliminary round matches are located in Asia. A host country may or may not have a national volleyball team involved in the competition. A second break was introduced in later years: in some continents, teams must qualify to participate in the competition.

=== Winners ===
The history of Grand Prix's previous winners is a clear indication of how women's volleyball has been dominated, since the early 1990s, by four teams: Cuba, Brazil, Russia and China. Along with five-times winner USA, they are the only ones to hold a title at this competition as of 2005.

In 1993, the Cubans padded their already impressive record of a gold medal in the 1992 Olympic Games by winning the first edition of the Grand Prix. They were also running for the gold in 1994, but were defeated by an underranked Brazil: at that time, the Brazilians had never been able to catch a single medal in any major women's volleyball competition.

In the following years, Brazil proved beyond any doubt that their time as underdogs was over. It lost the finals in 1995 to USA, but came back in 1996 for a second Grand Prix title, winning all the matches that made up the Final Four round in five sets.

The Brazilians withdrew from the competition in 1997, and the winners were Russia. But they were back in 1998 for another gold. Russia took revenge in 1999, and defeated Brazil in straight sets to win their second Grand Prix title.

Russia's win in 2002 made them, like Brazil, three-time winners. But the South Americans untied the score by conquering the 2004, 2005, 2006, 2008 and 2009, and, afterwards, also 2013, 2014, 2016 and 2017 editions of the tournament. The winners in 2000, 2001 and 2003 were Cuba, USA and China, respectively. Netherlands won their first trophy in 2007. USA won four gold medals in 2010, 2011, 2012, and 2015.

== Competition formula ==
The Grand Prix's competition formula has proved less stable than the World League's. In the following years, major changes are likely to be introduced in an attempt to make women's volleyball more attractive to the audience. Some of the rules that are still in practice as of 2004 are:

- The Grand Prix has qualification procedures. They are not the same in every continent: teams may have to play a specific qualification tournament, or may qualify based on the FIVB World Rankings.
- The competition is divided in at least two phases: a preliminary round, with a system of rotating host cities; and one or more final rounds, with one or more host nations.
- The preliminary round is divided in weeks. Each week, the participating teams are organized in pools, and each team plays one match against all other teams in its pool.
- All games in a pool take place over a weekend in the same city. The cities are mostly located in Asia. Pools may be hosted in countries which are not actually involved in the competition.
- When all matches of the preliminary round have been played, the top n teams (overall standings) qualify for the final round(s), and the remaining ones leave the competition. The value of n depends on the number of participating teams and the format that will be employed in the finals, but it is usually five or six.
- If involved in the competition, host nation(s) automatically qualify for the final round(s).
- The 2013 Gran Prix has seen a record number of 20 teams taking part in the competition. The first 5 plus organisers Japan qualify to the finals.
- The FIVB has tried different formats for the final round(s). Originally, it was a round-robin "Top Four" system in which four teams played against each other and the winner was determined by number of wins, set average, point average, direct confrontation. For some years now (2004), the most commonly used is a mixed format: quarter-finalists are organized in two pools, and the top two teams in each pool play semi-finals and finals according to the Olympic format.
- In the preliminary round, a team is usually given the right to work with a list of eighteen players, from which the coach builds the twelve-player line-up that will be employed in a particular weekend. For the final round(s), only twelve players are allowed.

== Hosts ==
List of hosts by number of final round championships hosted.

Times hosted	Hosts	Year(s)
8	China	1994, 1995, 1996, 1999, 2007, 2010, 2012, 2017
6	Japan	1997, 2005, 2008, 2009, 2013, 2014
3	Hong Kong	1993, 1998, 2002
3	Italy	2003, 2004, 2006
2	Macau	2001, 2011
1	Philippines	2000
1	United States	2015
1	Thailand	2016

== Appearance ==
China and Japan are the only teams that participated in all editions of the World Grand Prix.

Team	Intercontinental Round			Final Round (Note: Since Group system was introduced in 2014, statistics of only Group 1 Final Round are included, as this is the medal round.)		
Team	App.	First	Last	App.	First	Last
China	25	1993	2017	24	1993	2017
Japan	25	1993	2017	13	1993	2015
Brazil	24	1993	2017	23	1993	2017
United States	24	1993	2017	12	1995	2017
Cuba	22	1993	2016	13	1993	2012
Russia	21	1993	2017	16	1993	2016
Italy	19	1994	2017	12	1999	2017
South Korea	18	1993	2017	4	1993	2003
Germany	18	1993	2017	4	2001	2009
Thailand	15	2002	2017	3	2011	2016
Netherlands	14	1994	2017	6	2003	2017
Poland	14	2004	2017	2	2007	2010
Dominican Republic	14	2004	2017	–	–	–
Kazakhstan	8	2007	2017	–	–	–
Puerto Rico	8	2009	2017	–	–	–
Serbia	7	2011	2017	3	2011	2017
Turkey	7	2008	2017	2	2012	2014
Argentina	7	2011	2017	–	–	–
Peru	6	1994	2017	–	–	–
Canada	5	2003	2017	–	–	–
Algeria	5	2013	2017	–	–	–
Bulgaria	5	2013	2017	–	–	–
Czech Republic	5	2013	2017	–	–	–
Belgium	4	2014	2017	1	2014	2014
Chinese Taipei	4	1994	2012	–	–	–
Australia	4	2014	2017	–	–	–
Croatia	4	2014	2017	–	–	–
Mexico	4	2014	2017	–	–	–
Kenya	3	2014	2016	–	–	–
Colombia	3	2015	2017	–	–	–
Azerbaijan	1	2006	2006	–	–	–
Cameroon	1	2017	2017	–	–	–
France	1	2017	2017	–	–	–
Hungary	1	2017	2017	–	–	–
Trinidad and Tobago	1	2017	2017	–	–	–
Venezuela	1	2017	2017	–	–	–

Team last allocated in Group 1
Team last allocated in Group 2
Team last allocated in Group 3
Team was inactive in the last World Grand Prix

== Results summary ==
Year	Finals hosts	Final			3rd place match			Teams IR / FR
Year	Finals hosts	Champions	Score	Runners-up	3rd place	Score	4th place	Teams IR / FR
1993	Hong Kong	Cuba	3–0	China	Russia	3–1	Brazil	8 / 6
1994	(China); Shanghai	Brazil	Round-robin	Cuba	China	Round-robin	Japan	12 / 4
1995	(China); Shanghai	United States	Round-robin	Brazil	Cuba	Round-robin	China	8 / 4
1996	(China); Shanghai	Brazil	Round-robin	Cuba	Russia	Round-robin	China	8 / 4
1997	(Japan); Kobe	Russia	Round-robin	Cuba	South Korea	Round-robin	Japan	8 / 4
1998	Hong Kong	Brazil	3–0	Russia	Cuba	3–1	China	8 / 4
1999	(China); Yuxi	Russia	3–0	Brazil	China	3–1	Italy	8 / 4
2000	(Philippines); Pasig	Cuba	3–1	Russia	Brazil	3–1	China	8 / 4
2001	Macau	United States	3–1	China	Russia	3–0	Cuba	8 / 8
2002	Hong Kong	Russia	3–1	China	Germany	3–1	Brazil	8 / 4
2003	(Italy); Andria	China	Round-robin	Russia	United States	Round-robin	Netherlands	12 / 6
2004	(Italy); Reggio Calabria	Brazil	3–1	Italy	United States	3–0	Cuba	12 / 6
2005	(Japan); Sendai	Brazil	Round-robin	Italy	China	Round-robin	Cuba	12 / 6
2006	(Italy); Reggio Calabria	Brazil	3–1	Russia	Italy	3–2	Cuba	12 / 6
2007	(China); Ningbo	Netherlands	Round-robin	China	Italy	Round-robin	Russia	12 / 6
2008	(Japan); Yokohama	Brazil	Round-robin	Cuba	Italy	Round-robin	United States	12 / 6
2009	(Japan); Tokyo	Brazil	Round-robin	Russia	Germany	Round-robin	Netherlands	12 / 6
2010	(China); Ningbo	United States	Round-robin	Brazil	Italy	Round-robin	China	12 / 6
2011	Macau	United States	3–0	Brazil	Serbia	3–0	Russia	16 / 8
2012	(China); Ningbo	United States	Round-robin	Brazil	Turkey	Round-robin	Thailand	16 / 6
2013	(Japan); Sapporo	Brazil	Round-robin	China	Serbia	Round-robin	Japan	20 / 6
2014	(Japan); Tokyo	Brazil	Round-robin	Japan	Russia	Round-robin	Turkey	28 / 6
2015	(United States); Omaha	United States	Round-robin	Russia	Brazil	Round-robin	China	28 / 6
2016	(Thailand); Bangkok	Brazil	3–2	United States	Netherlands	3–2	Russia	28 / 6
2017	(China); Nanjing	Brazil	3–2	Italy	Serbia	3–1	China	32 / 6

== Medals summary ==
Rank	Nation	Gold	Silver	Bronze	Total
1	Brazil	12	5	2	19
2	United States	6	1	2	9
3	Russia	3	6	4	13
4	Cuba	2	4	2	8
5	China	1	5	3	9
6	Netherlands	1	0	1	2
7	Italy	0	3	4	7
8	Japan	0	1	0	1
9	Serbia	0	0	3	3
10	Germany	0	0	2	2
11	South Korea	0	0	1	1
11	Turkey	0	0	1	1
Totals (12 entries)		25	25	25	75

== Most valuable player by edition ==
- 1993 – Mireya Luis (CUB)
- 1994 – Fernanda Venturini (BRA)
- 1995 – Tara Cross-Battle (USA)
- 1996 – Leila Barros (BRA)
- 1997 – Yevgeniya Artamonova (RUS)
- 1998 – Leila Barros (BRA)
- 1999 – Virna Dias (BRA)
- 2000 – Lyubov Sokolova (RUS)
- 2001 – Danielle Scott-Arruda (USA)
- 2002 – Yevgeniya Artamonova (RUS)
- 2003 – Paola Cardullo (ITA)
- 2004 – Logan Tom (USA)
- 2005 – Paula Pequeno (BRA)
- 2006 – Sheilla Castro (BRA)
- 2007 – Manon Flier (NED)
- 2008 – Mari Steinbrecher (BRA)
- 2009 – Sheilla Castro (BRA)
- 2010 – Foluke Akinradewo (USA)
- 2011 – Destinee Hooker (USA)
- 2012 – Megan Hodge (USA)
- 2013 – Thaísa Menezes (BRA)
- 2014 – Yūko Sano (JPN)
- 2015 – Karsta Lowe (USA)
- 2016 – Natália Pereira (BRA)
- 2017 – Natália Pereira (BRA)

== See also ==
- FIVB Volleyball Men's Nations League
- FIVB Volleyball Women's Nations League
- FIVB Volleyball Women's World Championship
- FIVB Volleyball Women's World Cup
- FIVB Volleyball World Grand Champions Cup
- FIVB Volleyball World League
- List of indoor volleyball world medalists
- Volleyball at the Summer Olympics
