= 2001 FIVB Women's World Grand Champions Cup squads =

This article shows all participating team squads at the 2001 FIVB Women's World Grand Champions Cup, held from November 13 to November 18, 2001 in Japan.

== Brazil ==
The following is the Brazil roster in the 2001 FIVB Women's World Grand Champions Cup.

#	Name	Date of birth	Height	Spike	Block
1	Gisele Florentino	1 August 1973	180 cm (5 ft 11 in)	282 cm (9 ft 3 in)	278 cm (9 ft 1 in)
2	Elisangela Oliveira	30 October 1978	184 cm (6 ft 0 in)	302 cm (9 ft 11 in)	282 cm (9 ft 3 in)
4	Raquel Peluci Silva	30 April 1978	191 cm (6 ft 3 in)	300 cm (9 ft 10 in)	282 cm (9 ft 3 in)
5	Fabiana Oliveira	7 March 1980	166 cm (5 ft 5 in)	276 cm (9 ft 1 in)	266 cm (8 ft 9 in)
6	Kely Fraga	3 October 1974	193 cm (6 ft 4 in)	310 cm (10 ft 2 in)	295 cm (9 ft 8 in)
8	Fernanda Doval	16 July 1975	190 cm (6 ft 3 in)	307 cm (10 ft 1 in)	283 cm (9 ft 3 in)
10	Virna Cristine Dias	31 August 1971	184 cm (6 ft 0 in)	306 cm (10 ft 0 in)	294 cm (9 ft 8 in)
11	Karin Rodrigues	8 November 1971	187 cm (6 ft 2 in)	315 cm (10 ft 4 in)	288 cm (9 ft 5 in)
12	Jaqueline Carvalho	31 December 1983	186 cm (6 ft 1 in)	302 cm (9 ft 11 in)	286 cm (9 ft 5 in)
13	Flavia Carvalho	19 June 1976	184 cm (6 ft 0 in)	307 cm (10 ft 1 in)	286 cm (9 ft 5 in)
14	Fabiana Berto	23 January 1976	178 cm (5 ft 10 in)	286 cm (9 ft 5 in)	274 cm (9 ft 0 in)
16	Erika Coimbra	23 March 1980	180 cm (5 ft 11 in)	301 cm (9 ft 11 in)	280 cm (9 ft 2 in)

== China ==
The following is the China roster in the 2001 FIVB Women's World Grand Champions Cup.

#	Name	Date of birth	Height	Spike	Block
1	Zhang Jing	14 October 1979	190 cm (6 ft 3 in)	324 cm (10 ft 8 in)	314 cm (10 ft 4 in)
2	Feng Kun	28 December 1978	183 cm (6 ft 0 in)	319 cm (10 ft 6 in)	310 cm (10 ft 2 in)
3	Yang Hao	21 March 1980	183 cm (6 ft 0 in)	319 cm (10 ft 6 in)	314 cm (10 ft 4 in)
4	Liu Yanan	29 September 1980	186 cm (6 ft 1 in)	320 cm (10 ft 6 in)	313 cm (10 ft 3 in)
6	Li Shan	21 May 1980	185 cm (6 ft 1 in)	317 cm (10 ft 5 in)	300 cm (9 ft 10 in)
7	Zhou Suhong	23 April 1979	182 cm (6 ft 0 in)	313 cm (10 ft 3 in)	305 cm (10 ft 0 in)
8	Zhao Ruirui	8 October 1981	196 cm (6 ft 5 in)	326 cm (10 ft 8 in)	315 cm (10 ft 4 in)
9	Zhang Yuehong	9 November 1975	182 cm (6 ft 0 in)	324 cm (10 ft 8 in)	322 cm (10 ft 7 in)
10	Chen Jing	3 September 1975	182 cm (6 ft 0 in)	312 cm (10 ft 3 in)	306 cm (10 ft 0 in)
12	Song Nina	7 April 1980	179 cm (5 ft 10 in)	303 cm (9 ft 11 in)	293 cm (9 ft 7 in)
13	Xiong Zi	8 November 1976	181 cm (5 ft 11 in)	305 cm (10 ft 0 in)	300 cm (9 ft 10 in)
18	Lin Hanying	20 July 1978	184 cm (6 ft 0 in)	312 cm (10 ft 3 in)	308 cm (10 ft 1 in)

== Japan ==
The following is the Japan roster in the 2001 FIVB Women's World Grand Champions Cup.

#	Name	Date of birth	Height	Spike	Block
1	Minako Onuki	15 October 1972	173 cm (5 ft 8 in)	300 cm (9 ft 10 in)	289 cm (9 ft 6 in)
2	Chikako Kumamae	11 April 1974	180 cm (5 ft 11 in)	304 cm (10 ft 0 in)	295 cm (9 ft 8 in)
3	Yuka Sakurai	2 September 1974	167 cm (5 ft 6 in)	285 cm (9 ft 4 in)	270 cm (8 ft 10 in)
6	Shinako Tanaka	28 July 1975	172 cm (5 ft 8 in)	294 cm (9 ft 8 in)	284 cm (9 ft 4 in)
10	Megumi Kawamura	12 July 1983	193 cm (6 ft 4 in)	303 cm (9 ft 11 in)	293 cm (9 ft 7 in)
11	Yoshie Takeshita	18 March 1978	159 cm (5 ft 3 in)	272 cm (8 ft 11 in)	261 cm (8 ft 7 in)
12	Kanako Naito	4 November 1980	182 cm (6 ft 0 in)	302 cm (9 ft 11 in)	292 cm (9 ft 7 in)
14	Miyuki Takahashi	25 December 1978	170 cm (5 ft 7 in)	290 cm (9 ft 6 in)	276 cm (9 ft 1 in)
15	Makiko Horai	6 January 1979	187 cm (6 ft 2 in)	308 cm (10 ft 1 in)	290 cm (9 ft 6 in)
16	Sachiko Sugiyama	19 October 1979	183 cm (6 ft 0 in)	305 cm (10 ft 0 in)	292 cm (9 ft 7 in)
17	Ikumi Nishibori	20 August 1981	168 cm (5 ft 6 in)	290 cm (9 ft 6 in)	275 cm (9 ft 0 in)
18	Ai Otomo	24 March 1982	183 cm (6 ft 0 in)	312 cm (10 ft 3 in)	305 cm (10 ft 0 in)

== South Korea ==
The following is the South Korea roster in the 2001 FIVB Women's World Grand Champions Cup.

#	Name	Date of birth	Height	Spike	Block
1	Kim Jin-yi	7 July 1980	180 cm (5 ft 11 in)	305 cm (10 ft 0 in)	302 cm (9 ft 11 in)
2	Kim Guy-Hyun	12 January 1975	171 cm (5 ft 7 in)	307 cm (10 ft 1 in)	290 cm (9 ft 6 in)
5	Kim Sa-Nee	21 June 1981	180 cm (5 ft 11 in)	305 cm (10 ft 0 in)	302 cm (9 ft 11 in)
6	Choi Kwang-Hee	25 May 1974	174 cm (5 ft 9 in)	304 cm (10 ft 0 in)	289 cm (9 ft 6 in)
7	Park Mee-Kyung	13 May 1975	181 cm (5 ft 11 in)	315 cm (10 ft 4 in)	303 cm (9 ft 11 in)
8	Koo Ki-Lan	10 March 1977	170 cm (5 ft 7 in)	303 cm (9 ft 11 in)	290 cm (9 ft 6 in)
9	Chung Sun-Hye	17 December 1975	174 cm (5 ft 9 in)	306 cm (10 ft 0 in)	290 cm (9 ft 6 in)
10	Lee Yun-Hui	8 October 1980	181 cm (5 ft 11 in)	310 cm (10 ft 2 in)	295 cm (9 ft 8 in)
11	Lee Meong-Hee	7 April 1978	175 cm (5 ft 9 in)	310 cm (10 ft 2 in)	295 cm (9 ft 8 in)
13	Kim Mi-Jin	22 July 1979	182 cm (6 ft 0 in)	315 cm (10 ft 4 in)	300 cm (9 ft 10 in)
14	Yang Sook-Kyung	5 March 1977	179 cm (5 ft 10 in)	312 cm (10 ft 3 in)	293 cm (9 ft 7 in)
16	Jung Dae-Young	12 August 1981	183 cm (6 ft 0 in)	315 cm (10 ft 4 in)	308 cm (10 ft 1 in)

== Russia ==
The following is the Russia roster in the 2001 FIVB Women's World Grand Champions Cup.

#	Name	Date of birth	Height	Spike	Block
2	Natalia Morozova	28 January 1973	188 cm (6 ft 2 in)	309 cm (10 ft 2 in)	302 cm (9 ft 11 in)
3	Anastasia Belikova	22 July 1979	190 cm (6 ft 3 in)	310 cm (10 ft 2 in)	300 cm (9 ft 10 in)
4	Elena Tiourina	12 April 1971	184 cm (6 ft 0 in)	297 cm (9 ft 9 in)	286 cm (9 ft 5 in)
6	Elena Godina	17 September 1977	196 cm (6 ft 5 in)	317 cm (10 ft 5 in)	310 cm (10 ft 2 in)
7	Natalia Safronova	6 February 1979	190 cm (6 ft 3 in)	317 cm (10 ft 5 in)	305 cm (10 ft 0 in)
8	Evguenia Artamonova	17 July 1975	191 cm (6 ft 3 in)	312 cm (10 ft 3 in)	306 cm (10 ft 0 in)
9	Elizaveta Tichtchenco	7 February 1975	190 cm (6 ft 3 in)	309 cm (10 ft 2 in)	302 cm (9 ft 11 in)
11	Ekaterina Gamova	17 October 1980	202 cm (6 ft 8 in)	321 cm (10 ft 6 in)	310 cm (10 ft 2 in)
12	Tatiana Gratcheva	23 February 1973	180 cm (5 ft 11 in)	300 cm (9 ft 10 in)	290 cm (9 ft 6 in)
14	Elena Plotnilkova	26 July 1978	186 cm (6 ft 1 in)	306 cm (10 ft 0 in)	298 cm (9 ft 9 in)
15	Anjela Gourieva	2 September 1980	198 cm (6 ft 6 in)	310 cm (10 ft 2 in)	303 cm (9 ft 11 in)
17	Olga Tchoukanova	9 June 1980	182 cm (6 ft 0 in)	302 cm (9 ft 11 in)	294 cm (9 ft 8 in)

== United States ==
The following is the United States roster in the 2001 FIVB Women's World Grand Champions Cup.

#	Name	Date of birth	Height	Spike	Block
2	Danielle Scott	1 October 1972	188 cm (6 ft 2 in)	325 cm (10 ft 8 in)	302 cm (9 ft 11 in)
3	Kelly Campbell	4 October 1977	185 cm (6 ft 1 in)	288 cm (9 ft 5 in)	272 cm (8 ft 11 in)
4	Benishe Roberts	20 August 1977	188 cm (6 ft 2 in)	315 cm (10 ft 4 in)	305 cm (10 ft 0 in)
5	Stacy Sykora	24 June 1977	176 cm (5 ft 9 in)	305 cm (10 ft 0 in)	295 cm (9 ft 8 in)
6	Elisabeth Bachman	7 November 1978	193 cm (6 ft 4 in)	318 cm (10 ft 5 in)	295 cm (9 ft 8 in)
7	Heather Bown	29 November 1978	188 cm (6 ft 2 in)	307 cm (10 ft 1 in)	290 cm (9 ft 6 in)
9	Therese Crawford	26 August 1976	178 cm (5 ft 10 in)	312 cm (10 ft 3 in)	304 cm (10 ft 0 in)
10	Nicole Branagh	31 January 1979	187 cm (6 ft 2 in)	304 cm (10 ft 0 in)	287 cm (9 ft 5 in)
11	Robyn Ah Mow	15 September 1975	170 cm (5 ft 7 in)	291 cm (9 ft 7 in)	281 cm (9 ft 3 in)
13	Tara Cross-Battle	16 September 1968	180 cm (5 ft 11 in)	311 cm (10 ft 2 in)	293 cm (9 ft 7 in)
16	Sarah Noriega	24 April 1976	187 cm (6 ft 2 in)	302 cm (9 ft 11 in)	301 cm (9 ft 11 in)
17	Jennifer Whitehead	7 March 1977	193 cm (6 ft 4 in)	315 cm (10 ft 4 in)	294 cm (9 ft 8 in)
