= Birgit Thumm =

German volleyball player (born 1980)

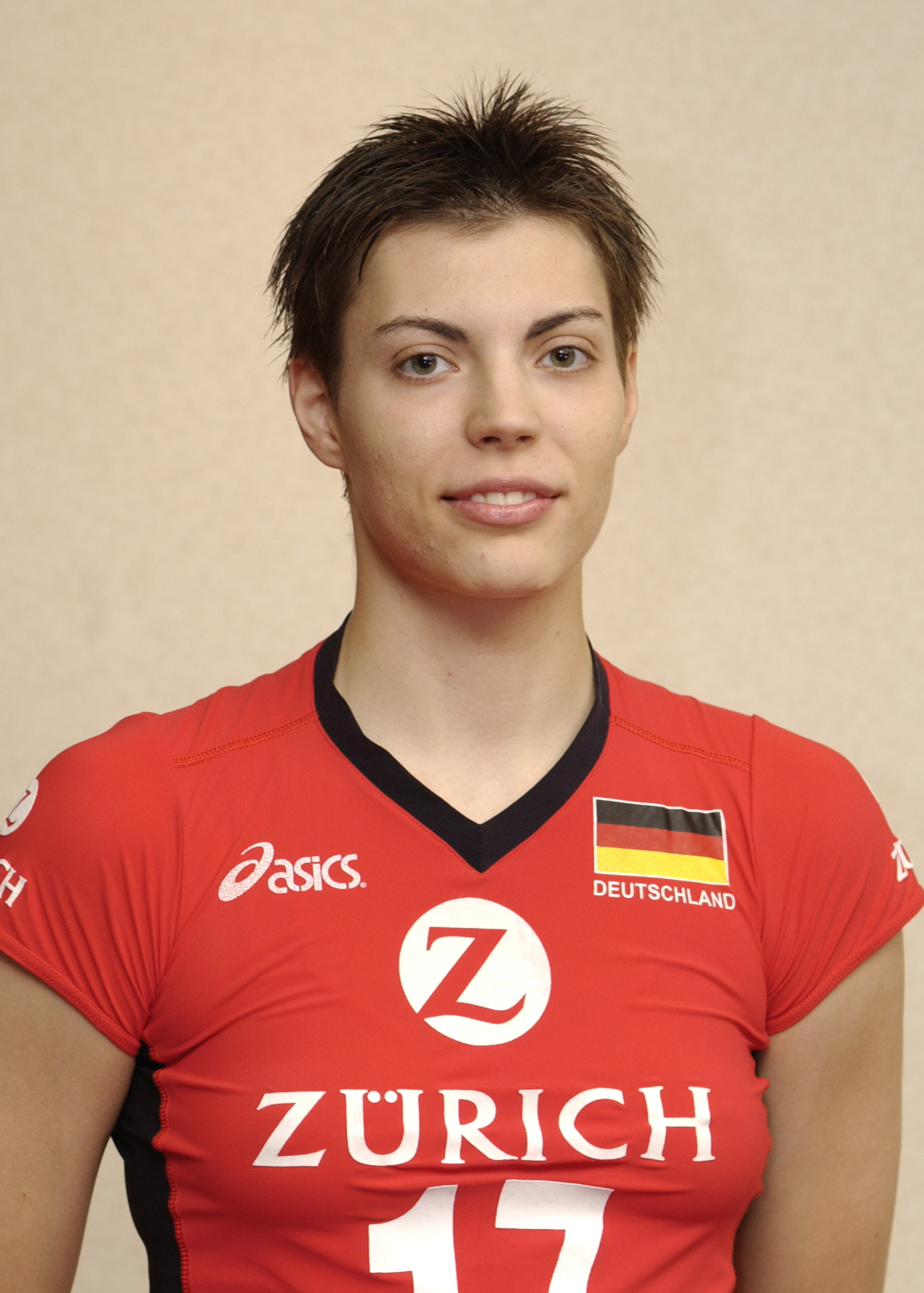
- Birgit Thumm

Medal record

Women's Volleyball

Representing Germany

FIVB Grand Prix
Bronze medal – third place	2002 Hong Kong	Team competition

Birgit Thumm (born 3 July 1980) is a German volleyball player.

She made her debut for the German Women's National Team in 1999. She played at the 2002 FIVB Volleyball Women's World Championship in Germany; she represented her native country at the 2004 Summer Olympics in Athens, Greece.

She is 184 cm tall, and is nicknamed "Thummi". She was born in Heidenheim, Baden-Württemberg.

== Honours ==
- 1999 European Championship – 4th place
- 2001 European Championship – 9th place
- 2001 FIVB World Grand Prix – 8th place
- 2002 FIVB World Grand Prix – 3rd place
- 2002 World Championship – 10th place
- 2004 Olympic Games – 9th place
- 2005 FIVB World Grand Prix – 10th place
- 2006 World Championship – 11th place
