= Yevgeniya Estes =

Russian volleyball player

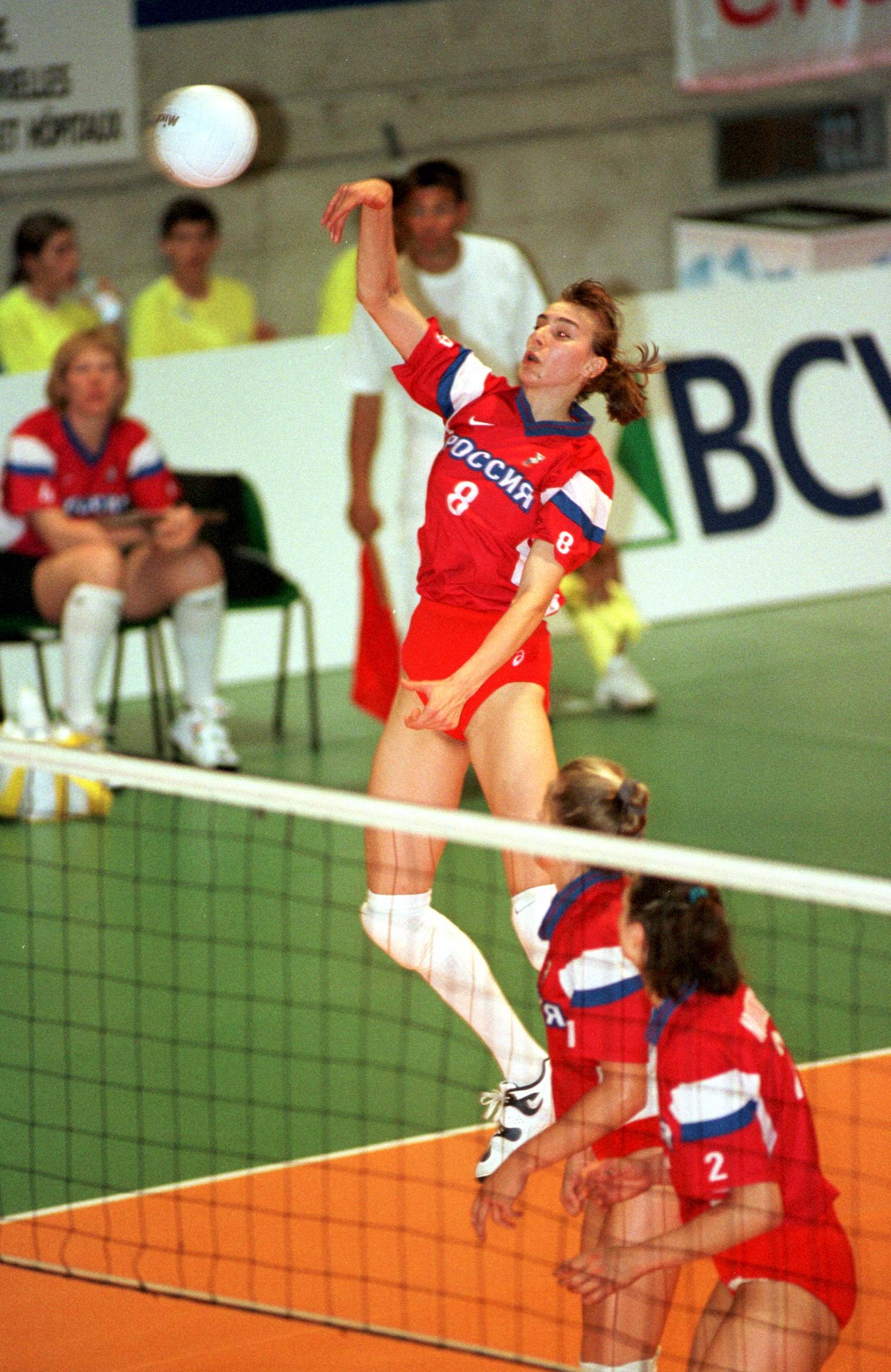

Personal information
- Full name: Yevgeniya Artamonova Estes
- Born: Yevgeniya Artamonova; 17 July 1975 (age 51); Sverdlovsk, Russian SFSR, Soviet Union
- Height: 1.91 m (6 ft 3 in)

Volleyball information
- Position: Outside hitter
- Number: 8 (national team)

Career
Years	Teams
1991–1995; 1995–1999; 1999–2000; 2000–2001; 2001–2002; 2002–2004; 2004–2006; 2006–2007; 2007–2012	Uralochka Ekaterinburgo; Okisu Toyobo; Eczacıbaşı Istanbul; Virtus Reggio Calabria; Uralochka-NTMK; Takefuji Bamboo; Volero Zurich; Takefuji Bamboo; Uralochka-NTMK

National team
1991; 1992; 1993–2012	Soviet Union; Unified Team; Russia
Honours
Women's volleyball
Representing Soviet Union
World Cup
Bronze medal – third place	1991 Japan
World U20 Championship
Gold medal – first place	1991 Czechoslovakia	Under-20
Representing CIS ( Unified Team)
Olympic Games
Silver medal – second place	1992 Barcelona	Team
Silver medal – second place	2000 Sydney	Team
Silver medal – second place	2004 Athens	Team
European Junior Championship
Gold medal – first place	1992 Greece	Under-19
Representing Russia
Olympic Games
Silver medal – second place	2000 Sydney	Team
Silver medal – second place	2004 Athens	Team
World Championship
Bronze medal – third place	1994 Brazil	Team
Bronze medal – third place	1998 Japan	Team
Bronze medal – third place	2002 Germany	Team
World Cup
Silver medal – second place	1999 Japan
World Grand Champions Cup
Gold medal – first place	1997 Japan
Silver medal – second place	2001 Japan	Team
Bronze medal – third place	1993 Japan
Goodwill Games
Gold medal – first place	1994 Saint Petersburg	Team
FIVB World Grand Prix
Gold medal – first place	1997 Kobe
Gold medal – first place	1999 Yu Xi
Gold medal – first place	2002 Hong Kong
Silver medal – second place	1998 Hong Kong
Silver medal – second place	2000 Manila
Silver medal – second place	2003 Andria
Bronze medal – third place	1993 Hong Kong
Bronze medal – third place	1996 Shangai
Bronze medal – third place	2001 Macau
European Championship
Gold medal – first place	1993 Czech Republic
Gold medal – first place	1997 Czech Republic
Gold medal – first place	1999 Italy
Gold medal – first place	2001 Bulgaria
Bronze medal – third place	1995 Netherlands
World U20 Championship
Bronze medal – third place	1995 Thailand	Under-20

Yevgeniya Viktorovna Estes (Russian: Евге́ния Ви́кторовна Э́стес, born 17 July 1975), née Artamonova (Артамонова), is a Russian former volleyball player who was a member of the national team and one of only two volleyball players (along with Sergey Tetyukhin) that competed consecutively in six Olympic Games. She won silver medals at the 1992 Summer Olympics in Barcelona, the 2000 Summer Olympics in Sydney, and the 2004 Summer Olympics in Athens.

Estes was briefly unable to play in 1994 due to an injury requiring knee surgery. She quickly recovered and became a dominant force on the Russian national team, leading Russia to the gold medal at the Goodwill Games in Saint Petersburg.

In 2018, Estes was inducted into the International Volleyball Hall of Fame.

== Honors ==
- 1991 World Under-20 Championship — 1st place
- 1991 World Cup — 3rd place
- 1992 European Junior Championship — 1st place
- 1992 Olympic Games — 2nd place
- 1993 FIVB World Grand Prix — 3rd place
- 1993 European Championship — 1st place
- 1993 World Grand Champions Cup — 3rd place
- 1994 Goodwill Games — 1st place
- 1994 World Championship — 3rd place
- 1995 World Under-20 Championship — 3rd place
- 1995 European Championship — 3rd place
- 1996 FIVB World Grand Prix — 3rd place
- 1996 Olympic Games — 4th place
- 1997 FIVB World Grand Prix — 1st place
- 1997 European Championship — 1st place
- 1997 World Grand Champions Cup — 1st place
- 1998 FIVB World Grand Prix — 2nd place
- 1998 World Championship — 3rd place
- 1999 FIVB World Grand Prix — 1st place
- 1999 European Championship — 1st place
- 1999 World Cup — 2nd place
- 2000 FIVB World Grand Prix — 2nd place
- 2000 Olympic Games — 2nd place
- 2001 FIVB World Grand Prix — 3rd place
- 2001 European Championship — 1st place
- 2001 World Grand Champions Cup — 2nd place
- 2002 FIVB World Grand Prix — 1st place
- 2002 World Championship — 3rd place
- 2003 FIVB World Grand Prix — 2nd place
- 2004 Olympic Games — 2nd place
- 2008 Olympic Games — 5th place
- 2012 Olympic Games — 5th place

== Individual awards ==
- 1997 World Grand Champions Cup "Most Valuable Player"
- 1999 European Championship "Most Valuable Player"
- 2002 World Grand Prix "Most Valuable Player"

Awards
Preceded by (Brazil) Leila Barros (United States) Danielle Scott-Arruda	Most Valuable Player of FIVB World Grand Prix; 1997; 2002	Succeeded by (Brazil) Leila Barros (Italy) Paola Cardullo
