= Natalya Morozova =

Russian volleyball player (born 1973)

Personal information
- Full name: Nataliya Igorevna Morozova
- Born: 28 January 1973 (age 53) Sverdlovsk, Russian SFSR, Soviet Union
- Height: 188 cm (6 ft 2 in)
Medal record

Women's volleyball
Representing Soviet Union
World Cup
| Silver medal – second place | 1989 Japan | Team |
| Bronze medal – third place | 1991 Japan | Team |
European Championship
| Gold medal – first place | 1991 Italy | Team |
World U20 Championship
| Gold medal – first place | 1991 Czechoslovakia | Under-20 |
European Junior Championship
| Gold medal – first place | 1990 Austria | Under-19 |
Representing CIS ( Unified Team)
Olympic Games
| Silver medal – second place | 1992 Barcelona | Team |
European Junior Championship
| Gold medal – first place | 1992 Greece | Under-19 |
Representing Russia
Olympic Games
| Silver medal – second place | 2000 Sydney | Team |
World Championship
| Bronze medal – third place | 1994 Brazil | Team |
| Bronze medal – third place | 1998 Japan | Team |
World Cup
| Silver medal – second place | 1999 Japan | Team |
World Grand Champions Cup
| Gold medal – first place | 1997 Japan | Team |
| Silver medal – second place | 2001 Japan | Team |
| Bronze medal – third place | 1993 Japan | Team |
Goodwill Games
| Gold medal – first place | 1994 Saint Petersburg | Team |
FIVB World Grand Prix
| Gold medal – first place | 1997 Kobe | Team |
| Gold medal – first place | 1999 Yu Xi | Team |
| Gold medal – first place | 2002 Hong Kong | Team |
| Silver medal – second place | 1998 Hong Kong | Team |
| Silver medal – second place | 2000 Manila | Team |
| Bronze medal – third place | 1993 Hong Kong | Team |
| Bronze medal – third place | 1996 Shangai | Team |
| Bronze medal – third place | 2001 Macau | Team |
European Championship
| Gold medal – first place | 1993 Czech Republic | Team |
| Gold medal – first place | 1997 Czech Republic | Team |
| Gold medal – first place | 1999 Italy | Team |
| Gold medal – first place | 2001 Bulgaria | Team |
| Bronze medal – third place | 1995 Netherlands | Team |

Natalya Igorevna Morozova (Russian: Наталья Игоревна Морозова; born 28 January 1973) is a Russian volleyball player who was a member of the national team that won the silver medals at the 1992 Summer Olympics in Barcelona and 2000 Summer Olympics in Sydney.
