= Yelizaveta Tishchenko =

Russian volleyball player

Yelizaveta Tishchenko OLY
Personal information
- Full name: Yelizaveta Ivanovna Tishchenko
- Born: 7 February 1975 (age 51) Kiev, Ukrainian SSR, Soviet Union
- Height: 192 cm (76 in)
- Spike: 309 cm (122 in)
- Block: 302 cm (119 in)

Volleyball information
- Position: Middle Blocker / Spiker
- Number: 9 (national team)

Career
- Years: Team
- 1990—1995 1995—1997 1997—1999 1999 1999—2004 2004—2005 2007—2011 2012—2013: Uralochka Ekaterinburgo; NEC Red Rockets; ŽOK Dubrovnik; Green Warriors Sassuolo; Uralochka Ekaterinburgo; VC Wiesbaden; VBC Cheseaux; VBC Cossonay

National team
- Years: Team
- 1992—2004: Russia
Honours
Women's volleyball
Representing Soviet Union
World U20 Championship
Gold medal – first place	1991 Czechoslovakia	Under-20
Representing CIS
European Junior Championship
Gold medal – first place	1992 Greece	Under-19
Representing Russia
Olympic Games
Silver medal – second place	2000 Sydney	Team
Silver medal – second place	2004 Athens	Team
World Championship
Bronze medal – third place	1994 Brazil	Team
Bronze medal – third place	1998 Japan	Team
Bronze medal – third place	2002 Germany	Team
World Cup
Silver medal – second place	1999 Japan	Team
World Grand Champions Cup
Gold medal – first place	1997 Japan	Team
Silver medal – second place	2001 Japan	Team
Bronze medal – third place	1993 Japan	Team
Goodwill Games
Gold medal – first place	1994 Saint Petersburg	Team
FIVB World Grand Prix
Gold medal – first place	1997 Kobe	Team
Gold medal – first place	1999 Yu Xi	Team
Gold medal – first place	2002 Hong Kong	Team
Silver medal – second place	1998 Hong Kong	Team
Silver medal – second place	2000 Manila	Team
Silver medal – second place	2003 Andria	Team
Bronze medal – third place	1993 Hong Kong	Team
Bronze medal – third place	1996 Shangai	Team
Bronze medal – third place	2001 Macau	Team
European Championship
Gold medal – first place	1993 Czech Republic	Team
Gold medal – first place	1997 Czech Republic	Team
Gold medal – first place	1999 Italy	Team
Gold medal – first place	2001 Bulgaria	Team
Bronze medal – third place	1995 Netherlands	Team

Yelizaveta Tishchenko (born 7 February 1975; first name also spelled Elizaveta; last name also spelled Tichtchenko) is a retired female volleyball player from Russia who made her debut for the Soviet national team in 1991. She competed in three consecutive Olympic Games (1996, 2000, and 2004), and twice won a silver medal.

Tishchenko represented her country more than 470 times from 1991 through 2004, playing as middle blocker in the starting six of the national team, and leading the Sbornaya as its captain in 2003 and 2004.

Tishchenko won the European Championships four times, the World Grand Prix three times, and additional medals at World Championships and World Grand Champions Cups. She was consistently among the best attackers in each tournament entered, winning best spiker awards at numerous international tournaments between 1999 and 2003, including the prestigious FIVB "Best Spiker of the Year" in 2002.

With her club teams (namely Uralochka VC of Ekaterinburg), Tishchenko won the Russian Championship 13 times and the European Champions League three times.

Tishchenko's greatest achievement, however, was coming back to play for Russia at the Olympic Games in Athens after having had open surgery on her knees only three months before. Doctors were incredulous after she won the silver medal in a dramatic final against China.

Tishchenko retired from the national team in 2004, however she continued to play for teams in the German and Swiss premier leagues.

== Personal life ==
Tishchenko has worked for the commercial department of UEFA and currently is working at the FIVB TV & Marketing Department.

== Honours ==
- 1991 World Under-20 Championship — 1st place
- 1992 European Junior Championship — 1st place
- 1993 FIVB World Grand Prix — 3rd place
- 1993 European Championship — 1st place
- 1993 World Grand Champions Cup — 3rd place
- 1994 Goodwill Games — 1st place
- 1994 World Championship — 3rd place
- 1995 European Championship — 3rd place
- 1996 FIVB World Grand Prix — 3rd place
- 1996 Olympic Games — 4th place
- 1997 FIVB World Grand Prix — 1st place
- 1997 European Championship — 1st place
- 1997 World Grand Champions Cup — 1st place
- 1998 FIVB World Grand Prix — 2nd place
- 1998 World Championship — 3rd place
- 1999 FIVB World Grand Prix — 1st place
- 1999 European Championship — 1st place
- 1999 World Cup — 2nd place
- 2000 FIVB World Grand Prix — 2nd place
- 2000 Olympic Games — 2nd place
- 2001 FIVB World Grand Prix — 3rd place
- 2001 European Championship — 1st place
- 2001 World Grand Champions Cup — 2nd place
- 2002 FIVB World Grand Prix — 1st place
- 2002 World Championship — 3rd place
- 2003 FIVB World Grand Prix — 2nd place
- 2004 Olympic Games — 2nd place

== Individual awards ==
- 1997 FIVB World Grand Prix "Best Spiker"
- 1999 FIVB World Grand Prix "Best Spiker"
- 1999 European Championship "Best Blocker"
- 1999 European Championship "Best Spiker"
- 2001 FIVB World Grand Prix "Best Spiker"
- 2001 European Championship "Best Spiker"
- 2001 World Grand Champions Cup "Best Spiker"
- 2002 FIVB World Grand Prix "Best Spiker"
- 2002 World Championship "Best Spiker"
- 2003 FIVB World Grand Prix "Best Spiker"
- 2003 European Championship "Best Spiker"

Awards
Preceded by (Brazil) Ana Paula Connelly (Cuba) Ana Fernández	Best Spiker of FIVB World Grand Prix; 1999; 2001, 2002, 2003	Succeeded by (Cuba) Ana Fernández (Cuba) Yumilka Ruiz
Preceded by (Cuba) Ana Fernández	Best Spiker of FIVB World Championship; 2002	Succeeded by (Cuba) Rosir Calderón
