= Marina Pankova =

Russian volleyball player (1963–2015)

Personal information
- Full name: Marina Anatolyevna Pankova
- Born: 3 March 1963 Bratsk, Russian SFSR, Soviet Union
- Died: 4 November 2015 (aged 52) Moscow, Russia
- Height: 180 cm (5 ft 11 in)
- Weight: 78 kg (172 lb)

Volleyball information
- Position: Setter

Career
- Years: Team
- 1985–1992 1992–1995 1995–1996 1998–1999: Uralochka Ekaterinburgo; UCAM Voley Murcia; Uralochka Ekaterinburgo; Galatasaray Istanbul

National team
- Years: Team
- 1987–1991 1992 1993–1996: Soviet Union; Unified Team; Russia
Honours

Women's volleyball
Representing the Soviet Union
Olympic Games
Gold medal – first place	1988 Seoul	Team
Representing the Unified Team
Silver medal – second place	1992 Barcelona	Team
World Championship
Representing Soviet Union
Gold medal – first place	1990 Beijing	Team
Representing Russia
Bronze medal – third place	1994 Brazil	Team
FIVB World Cup
Representing Soviet Union
Bronze medal – third place	1991 Japan
World Grand Champions Cup
Representing Russia
Bronze medal – third place	1993 Tokyo/Osaka
FIVB World Grand Prix
Representing Russia
Bronze medal – third place	1993 Hong Kong
Bronze medal – third place	1996 Shangai
Representing Russia
Goodwill Games
Gold medal – first place	1994 Saint Petersburg	Team
European Championship
Representing Soviet Union
Gold medal – first place	1991 Rome
Silver medal – second place	1987 Ghent
Representing Russia
Gold medal – first place	1993 Brno

Marina Anatolyevna Pankova née Nikulina (Russian: Марина Анатольевна Панкова; 3 March 1963 – 4 November 2015) was a Russian volleyball player who was a member of the Soviet team that won the gold medal at the 1988 Summer Olympics in Seoul. Four years later, she won a silver medal with the Unified Team at the 1992 Summer Olympics in Barcelona. She was a setter.
