= Natalya Safronova =

Russian volleyball player (born 1979)

Personal information
- Full name: Natalya Safronova
- Nationality: Russian
- Born: 6 February 1979 (age 47)
- Height: 1.90 m (6 ft 3 in)
- Weight: 77 kg (170 lb)
- Spike: 312 cm (123 in)
- Block: 305 cm (120 in)

Volleyball information
- Position: Wing spiker
- Current club: (Russia) Zarechie Odintsovo
- Number: 7

National team
1997–2009	Russia
Honours
Women's volleyball
Representing Russia
Olympic Games
Silver medal – second place	2004 Athens	Team
World Championship
Gold medal – first place	2006	Team
Bronze medal – third place	1998	Team
Bronze medal – third place	2002	Team
FIVB World Cup
Silver medal – second place	1999 Japan	Team
World Grand Champions Cup
Gold medal – first place	1997 Osaka/Hiroshima/Tokyo	Team
Silver medal – second place	2001 Saitama/Fukuoka	Team
Volleyball World Grand Prix
Gold medal – first place	1997	Team
Gold medal – first place	1999	Team
Gold medal – first place	2002	Team
Silver medal – second place	1998	Team
Silver medal – second place	2003	Team
Silver medal – second place	2006	Team
Silver medal – second place	2009	Team
European Volleyball Championship
Gold medal – first place	1997 Brno	Team
Gold medal – first place	1999 Rome/Perugia	Team
Bronze medal – third place	2005 Zagreb-Pula	Team
Bronze medal – third place	2007	Team
- Last updated: March 2010

Natalya Safronova (born 6 February 1979, in Krasnoyarsk), is a volleyball player from Russia. During her time playing with the Russian club Zarechie Odintsovo, she won the "Best Attacker" award at the 2006–07 CEV Cup.

On 3 December 2009 she collapsed during training after suffering a stroke. She was in coma for 18 days and only regained her speech a year after the incident took place.

She continues to recover from the stroke with her volleyball career likely to be over.

== Clubs ==
- (Russia) Uralochka Ekaterinburgo (1994–1998)
- (Japan) JT Marvelous (1998–1999)
- (Russia) Uralochka Ekaterinburgo (1999–2004)
- (Russia) Zarechie Odintsovo (2006–2008)
- (Russia) Dynamo Moscow (2008–2009)

== Awards ==
=== Individuals ===
- 2006–07 CEV Cup "Best Attacker"
