= Angela Miller (volleyball) =

American volleyball player (born 1970)

Personal information
- Nationality: American
- Born: December 8, 1970 (age 55)
- Height: 6 ft 1 in (185 cm)
- Education: Louisiana State University

Volleyball information
- Number: 3 (national team)

National team
1994	United States
Medal record
Women's volleyball
Representing the United States
Goodwill Games
Silver medal – second place	1994 Saint Petersburg	Team

Angela Miller (born December 8, 1970) is an American former volleyball player. She was part of the United States women's national volleyball team, and won a silver medal at the 1994 Goodwill Games in Saint Petersburg.

Miller participated at the 1994 FIVB World Championship in Brazil.

== College ==
Miller joined the national team after playing college volleyball at Louisiana State University. She was an AVCA second-team All-American in 1991 and a first-team All-American in 1992.
