= Yuliya Timonova =

Russian volleyball player

Personal information
- Full name: Yuliya Vladimirovna Timonova
- Born: 12 June 1973 (age 53) Saratov, Russia
- Height: 1.86 m (6 ft 1 in)

Volleyball information
- Position: Middle blocker
- Number: 11 (national team)

Career
- Years: Team
- 1994–1996: Uralochka Yekaterinburg

National team
- Years: Team
- 1990–1991 1993–1996: Soviet Union; Russia
Honours
Women's volleyball
Representing Soviet Union
FIVB World Cup
Bronze medal – third place	1991 Japan
European Championship
Gold medal – first place	1991 Italy
Representing Russia
World Championship
Bronze medal – third place	1994 Brazil	Team
Goodwill Games
Gold medal – first place	1994 Saint Petersburg	Team
European Championship
Gold medal – first place	1993 Czech Republic

Yuliya Timonova (born 12 June 1973) is a Russian former volleyball player. Timonova was part of the Russian women's national volleyball team, winning titles at the 1991 and 1993 European Championships. She won a bronze medal at the 1994 FIVB World Championship in Brazil. Timonova also participated at the 1996 Summer Olympics in Atlanta, finishing in fourth place. On club level she played with Uralochka Yekaterinburg.

== Clubs ==
- Uralochka Yekaterinburg (1994–1996)
