= Yelena Tyurina =

Russian volleyball player (born 1971)

Elena Batoukhtina

Personal information
- Full name: Elena Batukhtina-Tiourina
- Born: 12 April 1971 (age 55); Sverdlovsk, Russian SFSR, Soviet Union
- Height: 1.84 m (6 ft 0 in)
- Weight: 80 kg (176 lb)
- Spike: 313 cm (123 in)
- Block: 299 cm (118 in)

Volleyball information
- Position: Wing spiker
- Number: 4 (national team)

Career
Years	Teams
1987–1994; 1994–1998; 1999–2000; 2000–2001; 2001–2002; 2002–2005	Uralochka Ekaterinburgo; NEC Red Rockets; Uralochka Ekaterinburgo; HAOK Mladost; Virtus Reggio Calabria; Uralochka Ekaterinburgo

National team
1989–1991; 1992; 1992–2004	Soviet Union; Unified Team; Russia
Honours
Women's volleyball
Representing Soviet Union
World Championship
Gold medal – first place	1990 China	Team
World Cup
Silver medal – second place	1989 Japan
Bronze medal – third place	1991 Japan
Goodwill Games
Gold medal – first place	1990 Seattle
European Championship
Gold medal – first place	1989 West Germany
Gold medal – first place	1991 Italy
European Junior Championship
Gold medal – first place	1990 Austria	Under-19
Representing Unified Team
Olympic Games
Silver medal – second place	1992 Barcelona	Team
Representing Russia
Olympic Games
Silver medal – second place	2000 Sydney	Team
Silver medal – second place	2004 Athens	Team
World Championship
Bronze medal – third place	1994 Brazil	Team
Bronze medal – third place	2002 Germany	Team
World Grand Champions Cup
Gold medal – first place	1997 Japan
Silver medal – second place	2001 Japan	Team
Bronze medal – third place	1993 Japan
Goodwill Games
Gold medal – first place	1994 Saint Petersburg	Team
FIVB World Grand Prix
Gold medal – first place	1997 Kobe
Silver medal – second place	2000 Manila
Bronze medal – third place	1993 Hong Kong
Bronze medal – third place	1996 Shangai
Bronze medal – third place	2001 Macau
European Championship
Gold medal – first place	1993 Czech Republic
Gold medal – first place	1997 Czech Republic
Gold medal – first place	2001 Bulgaria
Bronze medal – third place	1995 Netherlands

Elena Tyurina-Batukhtina (born 12 April 1971) is a retired female volleyball player from Russia who made her debut for the Soviet national team in 1989. She competed consecutively in four Olympic Games. She was part of the Soviet and Russian national teams and became European Champion in 1989, 1991, 1993, 1997 and 2001. On club level she played with Uralochka Ekaterinburg

== Clubs ==
- Uralochka Ekaterinburg (1994)

== Honours ==
- 1989 European Championship — 1st place
- 1989 World Cup — 2nd place
- 1990 World Championship — 1st place
- 1991 European Championship — 1st place
- 1991 World Cup — 3rd place
- 1992 Olympic Games — 2nd place
- 1993 FIVB World Grand Prix — 3rd place
- 1993 European Championship — 1st place
- 1993 World Grand Champions Cup — 2nd place
- 1994 World Championship — 3rd place
- 1995 European Championship — 3rd place
- 1996 FIVB World Grand Prix — 3rd place
- 1997 FIVB World Grand Prix — 1st place
- 1997 European Championship — 1st place
- 1997 World Grand Champions Cup — 1st place
- 2000 FIVB World Grand Prix — 2nd place
- 2000 Olympic Games — 2nd place
- 2001 FIVB World Grand Prix — 3rd place
- 2001 European Championship — 1st place
- 2001 World Grand Champions Cup — 2nd place
- 2002 World Championship — 3rd place
- 2003 FIVB World Grand Prix — 2nd place
- 2004 Olympic Games — 2nd place

== Individual awards ==
- 1994 World Championship "Best Scorer"
- 1997 FIVB World Grand Prix "Most Valuable Player"
- 2001 FIVB World Grand Prix "Best Receiver"
