= Yelena Plotnikova =

Russian volleyball player (born 1978)

Elena Zarubina (Plotnilkova)
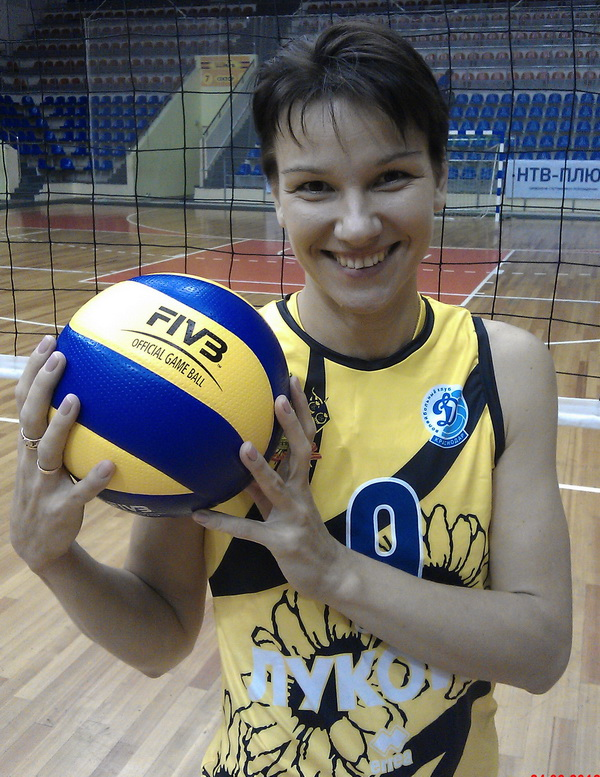

Personal information
- Full name: Yelena Mikhaylovna Plotnikova (-Zarubina)
- Nationality: Russian
- Born: 26 July 1978 (age 48)
- Height: 186 cm (73 in)
- Spike: 306 cm (120 in)
- Block: 298 cm (117 in)

Volleyball information
- Number: 14 (national team)

National team
2001	Russia
Honours
Women's volleyball
Representing Russia
Olympic Games
Silver medal – second place	2004 Athens	Team
World Championship
Bronze medal – third place	1998 Japan	Team
Bronze medal – third place	2002 Germany	Team

Elena Zarubina (Plotnikova) (Russian: Елена Михайловна Зарубина (Плотникова)) (born 26 July 1978) is a Russian volleyball player with the Women's National Team, for which she made her debut in 1998.

She represented her country at the 2004 Summer Olympics in Athens, Greece, and won the silver medal. She participated at the 2003 FIVB World Grand Prix, and 2004 FIVB World Grand Prix.

== Honours ==
- 1998 World Championship — 3rd place
- 1999 FIVB World Grand Prix — 1st place
- 1999 European Championship — 1st place
- 2001 FIVB World Grand Prix — 3rd place
- World Grand Champions Cup — 2nd place
- 2001 European Championship — 1st place
- 2002 FIVB World Grand Prix — 1st place
- 2002 World Championship — 3rd place
- 2003 FIVB World Grand Prix — 2nd place
- 2004 Olympic Games — 2nd place
