= Volleyball at the 1994 Goodwill Games – Women's team rosters =

This article shows all participating women's volleyball squads at the 1994 Goodwill Games, held from July 21 to 27, 1994 in Saint Petersburg, Russia.

== China ==
No.	Name	Date of birth	Position	Club
-			coach	
	Deng Yang			
	Tian Mei			
	Qiu Aihua	28 January 1977		
	Li Yizhi	11 January 1977		
	Xiao Nin Lu			
	Zhang Ying			
	Zhang He			
	Shen Hong			
	Yan Wang			
	Li Yan	1 May 1976		
	Xu Ya Chen			

== Cuba ==
No.	Name	Date of birth	Position	Club
-			coach	
	Taismary Agüero	5 March 1977	opposite	
	Irina Cepero			
	Marta Sánchez	17 May 1973	outside hitter	
	Tania Ortiz	30 October 1965	setter	
	Isel Saavedra	7 July 1971	outside hitter	
	Yumilka Ruiz	8 May 1978	outside hitter	
	Zoila Barros	6 August 1976	middle blocker	
	Mercedes Calderón	1 September 1965	middle blocker	
	Maybelis Martínez	12 June 1977		
	Yoselin Roque	11 December 1975		
	Reina Siler			
	Mirla Ferredon			

== Germany ==
No.	Name	Date of birth	Position	Club
-			coach	
	Susanne Lahme	10 September 1968	middle blocker	(Italy) Pallavolo Sumirago
	Constance Radfan			
	Jacqueline Riedel			
	Ines Pianka	15 March 1969	setter	(Germany) 1. VC Schwerte
	Claudia Wilke	18 May 1971		
	Anne-Kathrin Schade	26 June 1968		(Germany) USC Münster
	Ulrike Schwerdtner			
	Sylvia Roll	29 May 1973	outside hitter	(Italy) Pieralisi Jesi
	Karin Horninger	18 June 1971		
	Christina Schultz	10 November 1969	middle blocker	(Germany) Schweriner SC
	Johanna Reinink	22 June 1974	outside hitter	(Germany) SCU Emlichheim
	Janine Gräfe			

== Japan ==
No.	Name	Date of birth	Position	Club
-			coach	
	Naomi Eto	12 July 1982	middle blocker	(Japan) Hitachi Berufiyu
	Kazuyo Matsukawa			
	Aki Nagatomi	15 July 1969	outside hitter	(Japan) Hitachi Berufiyu
	Yumi Natta			
	Maki Fujiyoshi	24 May 1974	outside hitter	(Japan) Hitachi Berufiyu
	Mika Yamauchi	7 October 1969	outside hitter	(Japan) Daiei
	Kiyoko Fukuda			
	Miho Murata	3 September 1980	outside hitter	(Japan) Hitachi Berufiyu
	Chie Natori	9 August 1969		
	Motoko Obayashi	15 June 1967	outside hitter	(Japan) Hitachi Berufiyu
	Asako Tajimi	26 June 1972	middle blocker	(Japan) Hitachi Berufiyu
	Tomoko Yoshihara	4 February 1970	middle blocker	(Japan) Hitachi Berufiyu

== Netherlands ==
No.	Name	Date of birth	Position	Club
-			coach	
	Cintha Boersma	1 May 1969	outside hitter	(Italy) Jogging Altamura
	Marjolein de Jong	21 May 1968	outside hitter	
	Kirsten Gleis	22 May 1969	outside hitter	
	Vera Koenen	2 January 1967		
	Irena Machovcak	13 November 1968	outside hitter	
	Saskia van Hintum	24 April 1970	setter	
	Erna Brinkman	25 March 1972	outside hitter	
	Jerine Fleurke	11 August 1973		
	Aafke Hameny			
	Marrit Leenstra	18 October 1973	outside hitter	
	Silvia Raaymakers			
	Sandra Wiegers	26 April 1974	outside hitter	

== Peru ==
No.	Name	Date of birth	Position	Club
-	Park Man-bok	30 August 1936	coach	
	Milagros Cámere	22 September 1972	outside hitter	
	Iris Falcón	1 November 1973	outside hitter	
	Rosa García	21 May 1964	setter	
	Natalia Málaga	26 January 1964	outside hitter	
	Paola Ramos	20 April 1975		
	Janet Vasconzuelos	4 July 1969		
	Verónica Contreras	8 June 1977	setter	
	Miriam Gallardo	2 May 1968		
	Sara Joya	22 February 1976	middle blocker	
	Milagros Moy	17 October 1975	outside hitter	
	Sandra Rodríguez	12 April 1974		
	Yulissa Zamudio	4 March 1976	middle blocker	

== Russia ==
No.	Name	Date of birth	Position	Club
-		29 August 1964	coach	
	Evgenija Artamonova	17 July 1975	outside hitter	(Russia) Uraločka NTMK
	Tatyana Graçeva	23 February 1973	setter	(Russia) Uraločka NTMK
	Natalya Morozova	28 January 1973	outside hitter	
	Yuliya Timonova	12 June 1973	middle blocker	
	Yelena Tomilova			
	Inessa Yemelyanova			
	Elena Tyurina	12 April 1971	outside hitter	(Russia) Uraločka NTMK
	Mariya Liktenshtein			
	Valentina Ogienko		middle blocker	
	Elizaveta Tişenko	7 February 1975	middle blocker	(Russia) Uraločka NTMK
	Irina Uyutova			
	Marina Nikulina	3 March 1963	setter	

== United States ==
No.	Name	Date of birth	Position	Club
-			coach	
	Annette Buckner			
	Kristin Folkl	19 December 1975		
	Angela Miller			
	Beverly Oden	19 March 1971	middle blocker	
	Danielle Scott	1 October 1972	middle blocker	
	Elaine Youngs	14 January 1971	outside hitter	
	Nichelle Burton			
	Christine Garner	2 December 1973	outside hitter	
	Alicia Mills	6 September 1971	outside hitter	
	Kimberly Oden	5 June 1964	middle blocker	
	Cary Wendell	4 April 1974		
	Yoko Zetterlund	24 March 1969	setter	
