= Christine Garner =

American volleyball, basketball, and softball player (born 1973)

Personal information
- Born: Newport Beach, California, U.S.
- Home town: Tustin, California, U.S.
- Education: Arizona State University
- Height: 5 ft 11 in (180 cm)

Volleyball information
- Position: Outside hitter
- Number: 2 (ASU)

National team
- Years: Team
- 1994–1997: United States
Medal record
Women's volleyball
Representing the United States
Goodwill Games
Silver medal – second place	1994 Saint Petersburg	Team

Christine Garner is an American former volleyball player who was a three-sport athlete at Arizona State University (ASU). She played for the United States women's national volleyball team from 1994 to 1997.

== College ==
As a collegiate volleyball player, Garner still holds the ASU record of 1,871 career kills, and led ASU to its two most successful seasons in history. Garner ranks in the top 10 in career digs and service aces. She was a six-time Pac-10 Player of the Week and was also a recipient of a National Player of the Week honor. In addition to her numerous accolades at ASU, Garner was an AVCA second-team All-American in 1995.

Garner was also a star performer on the ASU softball team, and captain to both the ASU women's volleyball and basketball team. Garner went on after college to be part of the United States women's national volleyball team.

Garner was inducted into the Arizona State University Hall of Fame in 2009.

== National team ==
Garner won the silver medal with the national volleyball team at the 1994 Goodwill Games in Saint Petersburg. Other world-class tournaments that she participated in included the 1997 World Grand Prix and the 1997 NORCECA tournament. She left the national team in 1997 and played two seasons with the European Professional Volleyball League in Turkey and Italy.
