= Yekaterina Gamova =

Russian volleyball player

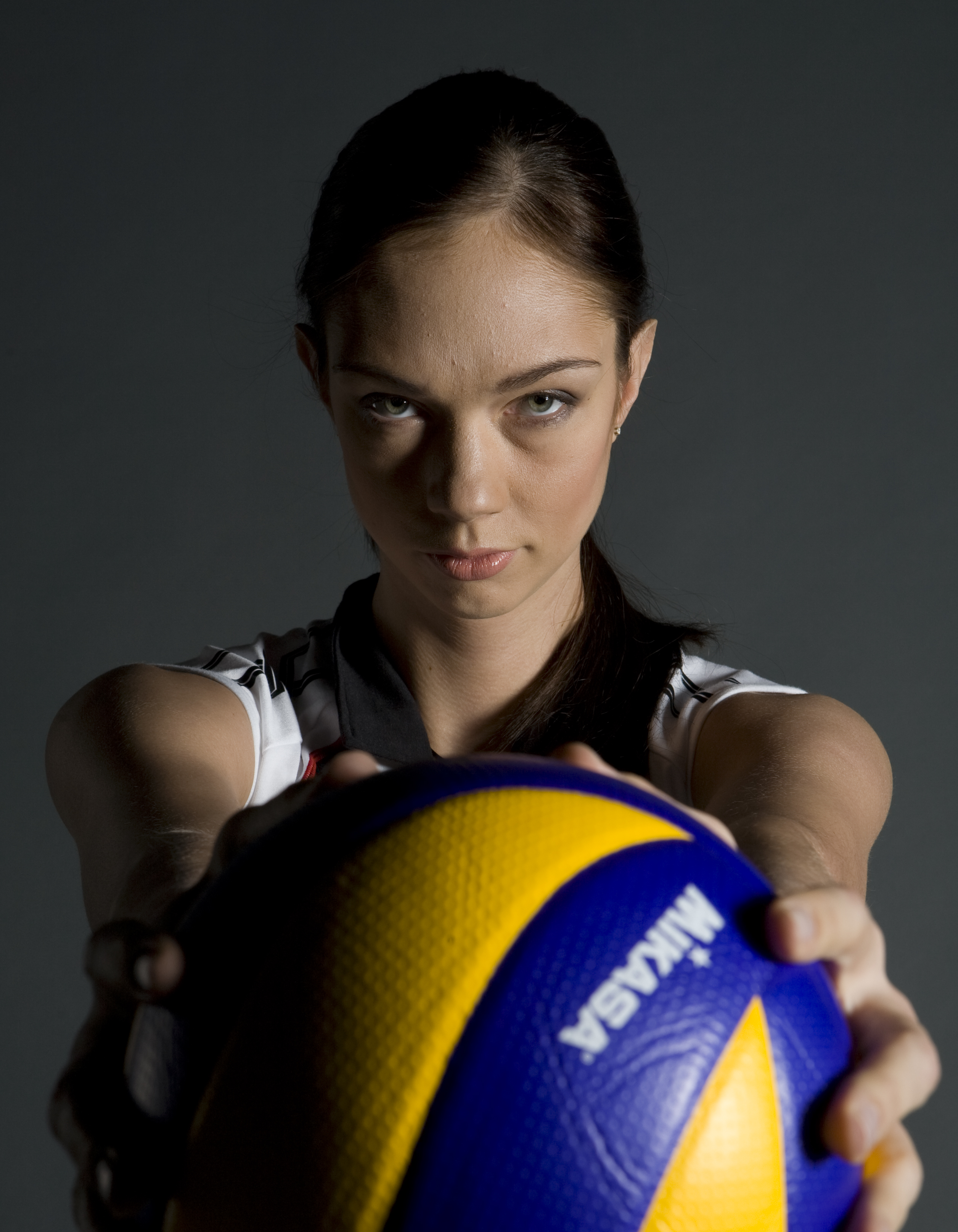
- Yekaterina Gamova in 2009

Personal information
- Full name: Yekaterina Aleksandrovna Gamova
- Nationality: Russian
- Born: October 17, 1980 (age 46); Chelyabinsk, Russia
- Hometown: Yekaterinburg, Russia
- Height: 202 cm (6 ft 8 in)
- Weight: 80 kg (180 lb)
- Spike: 350 cm (140 in)
- Block: 330 cm (130 in)

Volleyball information
- Position: Opposite

Career
Years	Teams
2000 - 2003; 2003 - 2009; 2009 - 2010; 2010 - 2016	(Russia) Uralochka-NTMK (Russia) Dynamo Moscow (Turkey) Fenerbahçe Acıbadem (Russia) Dinamo Kazan

National team
1999 - 2014	Russia
Honours
Women's volleyball
Representing Russia
Olympic Games
Silver medal – second place	2000 Sydney	Team
Silver medal – second place	2004 Athens	Team
World Championship
Gold medal – first place	2006 Japan	Team
Gold medal – first place	2010 Japan	Team
Bronze medal – third place	2002 Germany	Team
FIVB World Cup
Silver medal – second place	1999 Japan	Team
World Grand Champions Cup
Silver medal – second place	2001 Japan	Team
FIVB Volleyball World Grand Prix
Gold medal – first place	1999 Yu Xi	Team
Gold medal – first place	2002 Hong Kong	Team
Silver medal – second place	2000 Manila	Team
Silver medal – second place	2003 Andria	Team
Silver medal – second place	2006 Reggio Calabria	Team
Silver medal – second place	2009 Tokyo	Team
Bronze medal – third place	2001 Macau	Team
European Championship
Gold medal – first place	1999 Italy	Team
Gold medal – first place	2001 Bulgaria	Team
Bronze medal – third place	2005 Croatia	Team
Bronze medal – third place	2007 Belgium/Luxembourg	Team
Summer Universiade
Silver medal – second place	1999 Palma de Mallorca	Team
World U20 Championship
Gold medal – first place	1997 Poland	Under-20
Gold medal – first place	1999 Canada	Under-20
European Junior Championship
Silver medal – second place	1996 Turkey	Under-19
- Last updated: May 2016

Yekaterina Aleksandrovna Gamova (Russian: Екатерина Александровна Гамова; born 17 October 1980) is a Russian retired volleyball player. She was a member of the Russian national team that won the gold medals at the 2006 and 2010 FIVB Volleyball Women's World Championships, and the silver medal in both the Athens 2004 and Sydney 2000 Olympic Games. Due to her stature and dominance at the net, she has been hailed as the "Queen of Volleyball". She is 2.02 m (6 ft 8 in) tall with EU size 49 feet, making her one of the tallest female athletes in the world. She is also the second highest paid female player in professional volleyball history. Her role was outside hitter/opposite.

== Career ==
Playing with Dynamo Moscow, Gamova won silver medal at the 2008–09 CEV Indesit Champions League, and was awarded "Best scorer".

For the 2009/2010 season, she joined the Turkish team Fenerbahçe Acıbadem, and won the Turkish League Championship. The team went on to the 2010 CEV Indesit Champions League Final Four and finished second place after being defeated by Volley Bergamo. She was awarded "Best scorer".

She was a member of the Russia national team that won the 2010 World Championship and was named Most Valuable Playerof the tournament.

After the defeat in the quarterfinals by Brazil in the 2012 Olympics she considered quitting the national team but still continued playing at club level. "I will take a break with the national team. I don't know if it will be a permanent leave, or if I will resume after a long pause."

Gamova won with the Russian club Dinamo Kazan the 2013–14 CEV Champions League held in Baku, Azerbaijan, defeating the home owners Rabita Baku 3 - 0 in the semifinals and the Turkish VakıfBank İstanbul 3 - 0 in the final. She was awarded Most Valuable Player and Best Scorer.

Gamova won gold medal in the 2014 FIVB Club World Championship when her team defeated the Brazilian club Molico Osasco 3 - 0 in the championship match. She was named Best Opposite Spiker and Most Valuable Player among the championship Best Team.

In May 2016, Gamova announced on Match TV and her Facebook page her wish to retire from the sports due to an injury. With that said, she won't be participating at the 2016 Summer Olympics.

== Family ==
On 17 August 2012, Gamova married Russian cinematographer and producer Mikhail Mukasei, son of Svetlana Druzhinina and Anatoly Mukasei.

== Clubs ==
- (Russia) Avtodor-Metar (1996 - 1998)
- (Russia) Uralochka-NTMK 2 (1998 - 2000)
- (Russia) Uralochka-NTMK (2000 - 2003)
- (Russia) Dynamo Moscow (2003 - 2009)
- (Turkey) Fenerbahçe Acıbadem (2009 - 2010)
- (Russia) Dinamo Kazan (2010 - 2016)

== Awards ==
=== Government ===
- Merited Master of Sports of Russia (2000)
- Medal of the Order "For Merit to the Fatherland" II class (19 April 2001) - for the huge contribution to the development of physical culture and sports, and for the huge sports destinations at the XXVII Summer Olympics in Sydney in 2000
- Medal of the Order "For Merit to the Fatherland" I class (3 October 2006) - for the huge contribution to the development of physical culture and sports, and for sports destinations
- Decoration of Honour for Services in the Development of Physical Culture and Sports (28 April 2016)

=== Individuals ===
- 2000 FIVB World Grand Prix "Best blocker"
- 2003 FIVB World Grand Prix "Best scorer"
- 2004 Olympic Games "Best scorer"
- 2006 FIVB World Grand Prix "Best scorer"
- 2007 European Championship "Best scorer"
- 2008–09 CEV Indesit Champions League Final Four "Best scorer"
- 2009–10 CEV Indesit Champions League Final Four "Best scorer"
- 2010 FIVB World Championship "Most valuable player"
- 2013–14 CEV Champions League "Most valuable player"
- 2013–14 CEV Champions League "Best scorer"
- 2014 FIVB Club World Championship "Most valuable player"
- 2014 FIVB Club World Championship "Best opposite spiker"

=== National team ===
==== Junior ====
- 1999 Junior World Championship - Gold Medal

==== Senior ====
- 1999 World Grand Prix - Gold Medal
- 1999 FIVB World Cup - Silver Medal
- 2006 World Championship - Gold Medal
- 2010 World Championship - Gold Medal

=== Clubs ===
- 1998, 1999, Russian League Championship - Champion, with Uralochka-NTMK 2
- 2000-01, 2001-02, 2002-03, Russian Super League Championship - Champion, with Uralochka-NTMK
- 2005-06, 2006-07, 2008-09 Russian Super League Championship - Champion, with Dynamo Moscow
- 2009 Russian Cup - Champion, with Dinamo Moscow
- 2009-10 Turkish League Championship - Champion, with Fenerbahçe Acıbadem
- 2009-10 Turkish Cup Championship - Champion, with Fenerbahçe Acıbadem
- 2009 Turkish Super Cup Championship - Champion, with Fenerbahçe Acıbadem
- 2010-11, 2011-12, 2012-13, 2013-14, 2014-15 Russian Super League Championship - Champion, with Dynamo Kazan
- 2010, 2012, 2016 Russian Cup - Champion, with Dinamo Kazan
- 2013 - 2014 CEV Champions League - Champion, with Dinamo Kazan
- 2014 FIVB Club World Championship - Champion, with Dinamo Kazan

== See also ==
- List of tall women
- Russia women's national volleyball team
- Women's volleyball at the 2004 Summer Olympics

Awards
Preceded by (Russia) Yelena Godina	Best Blocker of FIVB World Grand Prix; 2000	Succeeded by (United States) Danielle Scott-Arruda
Preceded by (China) Yang Hao (Japan) Miyuki Takahashi	Best Scorer of FIVB World Grand Prix; 2003; 2006	Succeeded by (United States) Logan Tom (Italy) Taismary Agüero
Preceded by (Cuba) Nancy Carrillo	Best Server of FIVB World Championship; 2006	Succeeded by (Netherlands) Maret Grothues
