= Maki Fujiyoshi =

Japanese volleyball player

Personal information
- Nickname: Nozomi
- Born: 24 May 1974 (age 52)
- Height: 1.84 m (6 ft 0 in)

Volleyball information
- Position: Outside hitter

National team
1993–1997	Japan
Honours
Women's volleyball
Representing Japan
Goodwill Games
Bronze medal – third place	1994 Saint Petersburg	Team

Maki "Nozomi" Fujiyoshi (藤好麻希, Fujiyoshi Maki; born 24 May 1974) is a Japanese former volleyball player. While representing Japan, Fujiyoshi won the bronze medal at the 1994 Goodwill Games in Saint Petersburg.

== Biography ==
Fujiyoshi was born in Sakai, Ibaraki, Japan. She was a straight-left-hander. She played basketball from 1983 to 1990 but switched to volleyball in April 1990 on entering Ryugasaki Daini High School. She played for the Hitachi Belles Filles in 1993. Fujiyoshi announced her retirement from professional volleyball on 31 May 2001 at age 27. The retirement was attributed to chronic patellar tendinopathy that had progressively worsened during her final competitive season.

Her last professional appearance occurred on 20 May 2001 in a V.League match against NEC Red Rockets, where she played limited minutes due to pain.
