= Antonina Zetova =

Bulgarian volleyball player

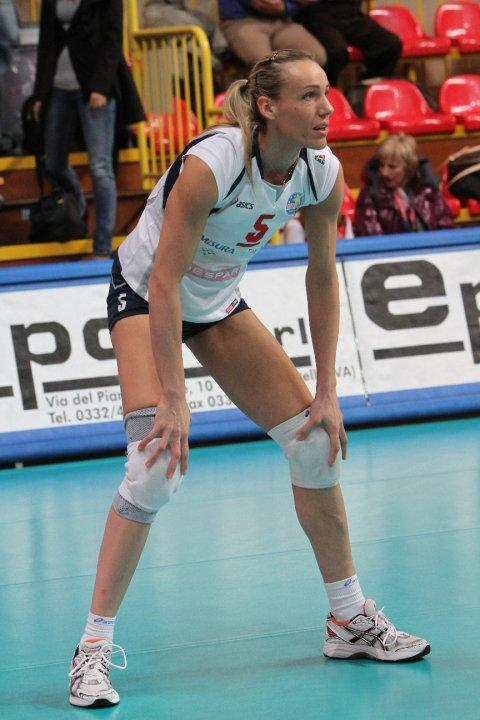
- Zetova playing for Sirio Perugia

Personal information
- Nickname: Toni
- Nationality: Bulgarian
- Born: September 7, 1973 (age 53); Pleven
- Hometown: Sofia
- Height: 1.89 m (6 ft 2 in)
- Weight: 77 kg (170 lb)
- Spike: 306 cm (120 in)
- Block: 301 cm (119 in)

Volleyball information
- Position: Opposite
- Number: 5

National team
1993–2012	Bulgaria
Honours
Women's volleyball
Representing Bulgaria
European Championships
Bronze medal – third place	2001 Varna	Team competition

Antonina Zetova (Bulgarian: Антонина Зетова; born on 7 September 1973 in Pleven) is a former international volleyball player from Bulgaria. She is the head coach of the Bulgaria women's national volleyball team and also coached the U18 and U23 women's national teams.

== Career ==
As a left handed outside hitter, the 1.89m (6ft 2.5in) tall Zetova lead the Bulgarian team to several successes, including a bronze medal at the European Championship in 2001, where she was awarded best scorer.

In the Italian league, where she played since 1998, Zetova won all possible national titles at least one time and European titles namely Top Teams Cup in 2005 with Chieri and the most important European Champions League title with Despar Perugia in 2006. She was elected best foreign player, All-Star and Best Spiker of the Italian league.

In 2008–09 she played for Palma Volley in Spain after giving birth to her son becoming vice champion and 2nd best player after Prisilla Rivera.

Zetova came back to her former clubs in Italy, Perugia and Chieri, in 2009 where she retired in 2012.

Toni was the head coach of Bulgaria's U23 women team. She was the assistant coach of CSKA Sofia's women volleyball team up until 2024 and most notably she was the head coach of the U18 women's volleyball team which ended up taking gold in the 2024 European Championship, something never seen before in Bulgaria's history.

== Clubs ==
- (Bulgaria) VC CSKA Sofia (1989–1995)
- (Turkey) Eczacibasi Istanbul (1995–1997)
- (Turkey) VakifBank Istanbul (1997–1998)
- (Italy) Omnitel Modena (1998–1999)
- (Italy) Phone Limited Modena (1999–2000)
- (Italy) Radio 105 Foppapedretti Bergamo (2000–2001)
- (Italy) Edison Modena (2001–2002)
- (Turkey) Eczacibasi Istanbul (2002–2003)
- (Italy) Pallavolo Chieri (2003–2004)
- (Italy) Bigmat Kerakoll Chieri (2004–2005)
- (Italy) Despar Perugia (2005–2007)
- (Greece) Olympiacos Piraeus (2008)
- (Spain) Palma Volley (2008–2009)
- (Italy) Despar Perugia (2009–2010)
- (Italy) Famila Generali Chieri (2010–2012)

== Awards ==
=== Individuals ===
- 1999–2000 Italian League "Best Scorer"
- 2000–01 Italian League "Best Scorer"
- 2006–07 Italian League "All-Star"
- 2024 Bulgarian Best Team
- 2024 Bulgarian Best Coach

=== Clubs ===
- 1990–91 Bulgarian Championship – Champion, with CSKA Sofia
- 1991–92 Bulgarian Championship – Champion, with CSKA Sofia
- 1992–93 Bulgarian Cup – Champion, with CSKA Sofia
- 1992–93 Bulgarian Championship – Champion, with CSKA Sofia
- 1994–95 Bulgarian Cup – Champion, with CSKA Sofia
- 1994–95 Bulgarian Championship – Champion, with CSKA Sofia
- 1997 Turkish Cup – Champion, with Eczacibasi Istanbul
- 1997 Turkish Championship – Champion, with Eczacibasi Istanbul
- 1998 Turkish Cup – Champion, with Eczacibasi Istanbul
- 1998 Turkish Championship – Champion, with Eczacibasi Istanbul
- 2000 Italian Championship – Champion, with Phone Limited Modena
- 2001–02 CEV Cup – Champion, with Edison Modena
- 2002 Italian Cup – Champion, with Edison Modena
- 2003 Turkish Cup – Champion, with Eczacibasi Istanbul
- 2003 Turkish Championship – Champion, with Eczacibasi Istanbul
- 2004–05 Top Teams Cup – Champion, with Pallavolo Chieri
- 2006 Italian League Cup – Champion, with Despar Perugia
- 2005–06 CEV Indesit Champions League – Champion, with Sirio Perugia
- 2007 Italian Cup – Champion, with Despar Perugia
- 2007 Italian Championship – Champion, with Despar Perugia
- 2006–07 CEV Cup – Champion, with Despar Perugia

=== Coaching ===
- Head coach of the U23 women's volleyball team in 2017, which took home the bronze medals.
- Head coach of the U18 women's volleyball team in 2024, which took home the gold medals.

=== National team ===
- 2001 European Championship – Bronze Medal
- 2010 European League – Silver Medal
