= Yumi Natta =

Japanese volleyball player

Personal information
- Born: 12 July 1969 (age 57) Settsu, Osaka, Japan
- Height: 1.61 m (5 ft 3 in)

Volleyball information
- Number: 12 (national team)

Career
- Years: Team
- 1994: Daiei

National team
- Years: Team
- 1994: Japan
Honours
Women's volleyball
Representing Japan
Goodwill Games
Bronze medal – third place	1994 Saint Petersburg	Team

Yumi Natta (born 12 July 1969) is a retired Japanese volleyball player. She was part of the Japan women's national volleyball team at the 1994 FIVB World Championship in Brazil, where she finished in seventh place. She helped Japan win the bronze medal at the 1994 Goodwill Games in Saint Petersburg. On club level, she played with Daiei.

== Clubs ==
- Daiei (1994)
