= Miho Murata =

Japanese volleyball player

Personal information
- Born: 3 September 1970 (age 56); Koriyama, Fukushima, Japan
- Height: 1.78 m (5 ft 10 in)

Volleyball information
- Position: Outside hitter
- Number: 8 (national team)

Career
Years	Teams
1994	Hitachi

National team
1993–1994	Japan
Honours
Women's volleyball
Representing Japan
Goodwill Games
Bronze medal – third place	1994 Saint Petersburg	Team

Miho Murata (村田 美穂, Murata Miho; born 3 September 1970) is a Japanese former volleyball player. Murata won a bronze medal with the Japanese women's national volleyball team at the 1994 Goodwill Games in Saint Petersburg.

Murata also played with the national team at the 1994 FIVB World Championship in Brazil, where she finished in seventh place. On club level she played with Hitachi.

== Clubs ==
- Hitachi (1994)
