= Mika Yamauchi =

Japanese volleyball player

Personal information
- Full name: Mika Yamauchi
- Nickname: Mika
- Born: 7 October 1969 (age 57); Yurihonjo, Akita, Japan
- Height: 1.82 m (6 ft 0 in)
- Weight: 69 kg (152 lb)

Volleyball information
- Position: Outside hitter
- Number: 8 (1992); 4 (1996)

National team
| 1992–1996 | Japan |
Honours
Women's volleyball
Representing Japan
Goodwill Games
| Bronze medal – third place | 1994 Saint Petersburg | Team |
Asian Games
| Bronze medal – third place | 1994 Hiroshima | Team |

Mika Yamauchi (山内 美加 Yamauchi Mika, born 7 October 1969) is a two-time Olympian from Japan who was a member of the Japan women's national volleyball team. Yamauchi played with Japan at the 1992 Summer Olympics in Barcelona and 1996 Summer Olympics in Atlanta. She won the bronze medal at the 1994 Goodwill Games in Saint Petersburg. Her nickname is Mika (ミカ).

== National team ==
- 1992: 5th place in the Olympic Games of Barcelona
- 1993: 4th place in the Grand Champions Cup
- 1994: 3rd Place in the Goodwill Games
- 1994: 7th place in the World Championship
- 1995: 6th place in the World Cup
- 1996: 9th place in the Olympic Games of Atlanta
