= 1997 FIVB Volleyball World Grand Prix =

Women's volleyball tournament

1997 FIVB World Grand Prix
Tournament details
- Host country: Japan (Group 1 Final)
- Dates: 29–31 August
- Teams: 8
- Venue: 1 (in 1 host city)

Final positions
- Champions: Russia (1st title)

Tournament awards
- MVP: (Russia) Yevgeniya Artamonova
- Best Setter: (Cuba) Taismary Aguero
- Best OH: (Russia) Yelena Godina; (Russia) Yevgeniya Artamonova
- Best MB: (Russia) Elizaveta Tichtchenko; (Cuba) Zoila Barros
- Best OPP: (Cuba) Regla Torres

The 1997 FIVB World Grand Prix was the fifth women's volleyball tournament of its kind. It was held over four weeks in eight cities throughout Asia, cumulating with the final round in Kobe, Japan, from 29 to 31 August 1997.

== Preliminary round ==
=== Ranking ===
The best three teams from the overall ranking and Japan as host are qualified for the final round.

Pos	Team	Pld	W	L	Pts	SW	SL	SR	SPW	SPL	SPR	Qualification
1	Russia	9	9	0	18	27	5	5.400	435	249	1.747	Final round
2	Cuba	9	6	3	15	23	13	1.769	489	454	1.077	Final round
3	South Korea	6	5	1	11	15	6	2.500	286	203	1.409	Final round
4	China	6	3	3	9	13	9	1.444	296	224	1.321	
5	Italy	6	3	3	9	9	13	0.692	238	277	0.859	
6	Japan (Note: Qualified as hosts) (H)	9	3	6	12	11	22	0.500	270	439	0.615	Final round
7	Netherlands	6	1	5	7	7	15	0.467	223	290	0.769	
8	United States	9	0	9	9	5	27	0.185	248	458	0.541	

(H) Host

=== First round ===
==== Group A ====
- Venue: Macau

Date		Score		Set 1	Set 2	Set 3	Set 4	Set 5	Total
8 Ago	Russia	3–0	United States	15–1	15–8	15–3			45–12
8 Ago	China	3–0	Italy	15–6	15–6	15–11			45–23
9 Ago	Russia	3–0	Italy	15–10	15–5	15–3			45–18
9 Ago	China	3–0	United States	15–0	15–7	15–4			45–11
10 Ago	Italy	3–2	United States	14–16	15–6	15–13	12–15	15–7	71–57
10 Ago	Russia	3–1	China	15–10	10–15	15–9	15–13		55–47

==== Group B ====
- Venue: Suwon, South Korea

Date		Score		Set 1	Set 2	Set 3	Set 4	Set 5	Total
8 Ago	South Korea	3–2	Netherlands	13–15	15–4	15–13	10–15	15–10	68–57
8 Ago	Japan	3–2	Cuba	15–8	15–11	8–15	14–16	15–13	67–63
9 Ago	South Korea	3–0	Japan	15–5	15–8	15–11			45–24
9 Ago	Cuba	3–2	Netherlands	15–13	7–15	15–11	15–17	15–12	67–68
10 Ago	South Korea	3–1	Cuba	15–12	13–15	15–12	15–11		58–50
10 Ago	Japan	3–0	Netherlands	15–2	15–11	15–9			45–22

=== Second round ===
==== Group C ====
- Venue: Taipei, Taiwan

Date		Score		Set 1	Set 2	Set 3	Set 4	Set 5	Total
15 Ago	South Korea	3–0	United States	15–4	15–4	15–4			45–12
15 Ago	Russia	3–0	Netherlands	15–0	16–14	15–2			46–16
16 Ago	Netherlands	3–0	United States	15–2	15–12	15–5			45–19
16 Ago	Russia	3–0	South Korea	15–8	15–9	15–8			45–25
17 Ago	South Korea	3–0	Netherlands	15–7	15–3	15–5			45–15
17 Ago	Russia	3–0	United States	17–15	15–4	15–2			47–21

==== Group D ====
- Venue: Hong Kong

Date		Score		Set 1	Set 2	Set 3	Set 4	Set 5	Total
15 Ago	Cuba	3–0	Japan	15–3	15–4	15–6			45–13
15 Ago	Italy	3–2	China	15–11	15–10	6–15	4–15	18–16	58–67
16 Ago	Cuba	3–0	Italy	15–9	15–6	15–8			45–23
16 Ago	China	3–0	Japan	15–7	15–5	15–11			45–23
17 Ago	Italy	3–0	Japan	15–2	15–10	15–6			45–18
17 Ago	Cuba	3–1	China	16–14	15–11	8–15	15–7		54–47

=== Third round (extra) ===
==== Group E ====
- Venue: Gifu, Japan

Date		Score		Set 1	Set 2	Set 3	Set 4	Set 5	Total
22 Ago	Russia	3–2	Cuba	14–16	16–14	15–8	15–12	15–12	75–62
22 Ago	Japan	3–2	United States	9–15	15–7	15–10	11–15	15–12	65–59
23 Ago	Russia	3–1	Japan	15–1	15–5	13–15	15–12		58–33
23 Ago	Cuba	3–0	United States	15–4	16–14	15–4			46–22
24 Ago	Cuba	3–1	Japan	15–7	12–15	15–12	15–13		57–47
24 Ago	Russia	3–1	United States	15–9	4–15	15–6	15–5		49–35

== Final round ==
- Venue: Kobe, Japan

Date		Score		Set 1	Set 2	Set 3	Set 4	Set 5	Total
29 Ago	Cuba	3–1	South Korea	16–17	15–7	15–3	15–3		61–30
29 Ago	Russia	3–0	Japan	16–14	15–1	15–7			46–22
30 Ago	Russia	3–0	South Korea	15–4	15–9	17–15			47–28
30 Ago	Cuba	3–0	Japan	15–12	15–8	15–9			45–29
31 Ago	Russia	3–2	Cuba	15–8	10–15	4–15	15–9	15–13	59–60
31 Ago	South Korea	3–1	Japan	10–15	15–7	15–2	15–5		55–29

=== Final ranking ===
Pos	Team	Pld	W	L	Pts	SW	SL	SR	SPW	SPL	SPR
1	Russia	3	3	0	6	9	2	4.500	152	110	1.382
2	Cuba	3	2	1	5	8	4	2.000	166	118	1.407
3	South Korea	3	1	2	4	4	7	0.571	113	137	0.825
4	Japan	3	0	3	3	1	9	0.111	80	146	0.548

== Final standings ==
Place	Team
1st place, gold medalist(s)	Russia
2nd place, silver medalist(s)	Cuba
3rd place, bronze medalist(s)	South Korea
4	Japan
5	China
6	Italy
7	Netherlands
8	United States

1997 FIVB World Grand Prix winners

Russia
First title

Team roster
Natalia Morozova, Anastasia Belikova, Yelena Tyurina, Elena Godina, Tatyana Menshova, Yevgeniya Artamonova, Yelizaveta Tishchenko, Yelena Vasilevskaya, Tatiana Gratcheva, Olga Chukanova, Natalia Safronova and Natalia Shigina.
Head coach
Nikolay Karpol

== Individual awards ==
- Most valuable player:
  - Evguenia Artamonova (RUS)
- Best scorer:
  - Evguenia Artamonova (RUS)
- Best spiker:
  - Evguenia Artamonova (RUS)
- Best blocker:
  - Regla Torres (CUB)
- Best server:
  - Ikumi Narita (JPN)
- Best digger:
  - Ikumi Narita (JPN)
- Best receiver:
  - Kang Hye-Mi (KOR)
- Best setter:
  - Tatyana Grachova (RUS)
- Best outside hitters:
  - Yevgeniya Artamonova (RUS)
  - Yelena Godina (RUS)
- Best middle blockers:
  - Zoila Barros (CUB)
  - Elizaveta Tichtchenko (RUS)
- Best Opposite:
  - Regla Torres (CUB)

== Statistics leaders ==
- Only players whose teams advanced to the semifinals are ranked.

Best scorers

Rank	Name	Points
1	(Russia) ARTAMONOVA Evguenia	142
2	(Cuba) TORRES Regla	121
3	(Russia) GODINA Elena	107
4	(Cuba) BELL Regla	97
5	(South Korea) KIM Nam Soon	92
6	(Russia) TITCHENKO Elizaveta	86
7	(Cuba) LUIS Mireya	85
8	(Japan) SASAKI Miki	82
9	(Russia) BATUKHTINA Elena	77
10	(Japan) TAJIMI Asako	75

Best spikers

Rank	Name	%Eff
1	(Russia) ARTAMONOVA Evguenia	84.12
2	(Cuba) TORRES Regla	80.16
3	(Cuba) LUIS Mireya	77.45
4	(Japan) TAJIMI Asako	73.72
5	(Russia) TITCHENKO Elizaveta	71.18

Best blockers

Rank	Name	Avg
1	(Cuba) TORRES Regla	1.05
2	(Japan) TAJIMI Asako	0.93
3	(Russia) TITCHENKO Elizaveta	0.88
4	(South Korea) CHANG So-Yun	0.83
5	(Cuba) BARROS Zoila	0.82

Best servers

Rank	Name	Avg
1	(Japan) NARITA Ikumi	0.33
2	(Cuba) BARROS Zoila	0.27
3	(Russia) ARTAMONOVA Evguenia	0.25

Best diggers

Rank	Name	Avg
1	(Japan) NARITA Ikumi	3.28
2	(Japan) MITSUNAGA Hitomi	3.22
3	(Cuba) LUIS Mireya	2.51

Best receivers

Rank	Name	%Succ
1	(South Korea) KIM Nam Soon	76.56
2	(Japan) NARITA Ikumi	72.18
3	(Japan) MITSUNAGA Hitomi	70.71

Best setters

Rank	Name	Avg	%Succ
1	(Cuba) AGUERO Taismary	11.17	57.56
2	(Russia) GRATCHEVA Tatiyana	8.87	52.48
3	(South Korea) KANG Hye Mi	6.34	49.84
4	(Japan) ONUKI Minako	5.23	45.23
