= 1993 Women's European Volleyball Championship =

Tournament details
- Host country: Czech Republic
- Dates: 24 September – 2 October
- Teams: 12
- Venue: Various (in 2 host cities)

Final positions
- Champions: Russia (14th title)

Tournament awards
- MVP: (Czechoslovakia) Lucie Václavíková

The 1993 Women's European Volleyball Championship was the 18th edition of the event, organised by Europe's governing volleyball body, the Confédération Européenne de Volleyball. It was hosted in Brno and Zlín, Czech Republic from 24 September to 2 October 1993.

== Participating teams ==
Team	Method of qualification
Belarus	Qualification group A winners
Bulgaria	1991 edition seventh place
Croatia	Qualification group D winners
Czechoslovakia	Hosts*
Germany	1991 edition third place
Greece	1991 edition eighth place
Italy	1991 edition fourth place
Latvia	Qualification group B winners
Netherlands	1991 edition second place
Romania	1991 edition sixth place
Russia	1991 edition first place
Ukraine	Qualification group C winners

*Note: Although the Czech Republic and Slovakia became separate countries in 1993, the Czechoslovakia Volleyball Federation (ČSFV) was not yet separate, therefore the team competed as Czechoslovakia (officially as Czech Republic + Slovak Republic). Czechoslovakia had already been chosen as host country before the country was dissolved.

== Format ==
The tournament was played in two different stages. In the first stage, the twelve participants were divided in two groups of six teams each. A single round-robin format was played within each group to determine the teams' group position. The second stage of the tournament consisted of two sets of semifinals to determine the tournament final ranking. The group stage firsts and seconds played the semifinals for 1st to 4th place, group stage thirds and fourths played the 5th to 8th place semifinals and the remaining four teams which finished group stages as fifth and sixth ended all tied in final ranking at 9th place. The pairing of the semifinals was made so teams played against the opposite group teams which finished in a different position (1st played against 2nd, 3rd played against 4th).

== Pools composition ==
Pool A	Pool B
Bulgaria	Belarus
Croatia	Germany
Czechoslovakia	Greece
Italy	Romania
Latvia	Russia
Netherlands	Ukraine

== Venues ==
Pool A and Final round	Pool B	Tournament host cities
Brno	Zlín	Tournament host cities

== Preliminary round ==
- All times are Central European Summer Time (UTC+02:00).

=== Pool A ===
- venue location: Brno, Czech Republic

Pos	Team	Pld	W	L	Pts	SW	SL	SR	SPW	SPL	SPR	Qualification
1	Italy	5	3	2	8	12	8	1.500	252	233	1.082	Semifinals
2	Czechoslovakia	5	3	2	8	12	8	1.500	255	245	1.041	Semifinals
3	Croatia	5	3	2	8	10	8	1.250	207	232	0.892	5th–8th place
4	Netherlands	5	3	2	8	12	11	1.091	293	265	1.106	5th–8th place
5	Bulgaria	5	2	3	7	9	12	0.750	249	265	0.940	
6	Latvia	5	1	4	6	6	14	0.429	248	264	0.939	

Date	Time		Score		Set 1	Set 2	Set 3	Set 4	Set 5	Total	Report
24 Sep	14:30	Italy	3–2	Netherlands	15–13	8–15	15–1	15–17	15–8	68–54	Report
24 Sep	17:00	Czechoslovakia	3–1	Bulgaria	15–8	8–15	18–16	15–10		56–49	Report
24 Sep	20:00	Croatia	3–1	Latvia	15–13	11–15	16–14	15–12		57–54	Report
25 Sep	14:30	Bulgaria	3–1	Netherlands	15–11	12–15	15–10	15–9		57–45	Report
25 Sep	17:00	Czechoslovakia	3–0	Latvia	15–11	15–13	15–11			45–35	Report
25 Sep	20:00	Italy	3–0	Croatia	15–5	15–8	15–7			45–20	Report
26 Sep	14:30	Latvia	3–2	Bulgaria	8–15	15–8	15–2	15–17	15–7	68–49	Report
26 Sep	17:00	Czechoslovakia	3–1	Italy	11–15	15–13	15–7	15–7		56–42	Report
26 Sep	20:00	Netherlands	3–1	Croatia	15–11	15–8	13–15	15–1		58–35	Report
28 Sep	14:30	Bulgaria	3–2	Italy	15–5	10–15	15–9	7–15	15–6	62–50	Report
28 Sep	17:00	Croatia	3–1	Czechoslovakia	4–15	15–2	15–13	15–13		49–43	Report
28 Sep	20:00	Netherlands	3–2	Latvia	13–15	15–4	8–15	15–8	15–8	66–50	Report
29 Sep	14:30	Croatia	3–0	Bulgaria	15–7	15–11	16–14			46–32	Report
29 Sep	17:00	Italy	3–0	Latvia	16–14	15–13	16–14			47–41	Report
29 Sep	20:00	Netherlands	3–2	Czechoslovakia	15–6	13–15	12–15	15–10	15–9	70–55	Report

=== Pool B ===
- venue location: Zlín, Czech Republic

Pos	Team	Pld	W	L	Pts	SW	SL	SR	SPW	SPL	SPR	Qualification
1	Ukraine	5	5	0	10	15	3	5.000	256	167	1.533	Semifinals
2	Russia	5	4	1	9	12	4	3.000	220	124	1.774	Semifinals
3	Germany	5	3	2	8	9	8	1.125	200	180	1.111	5th–8th place
4	Belarus	5	2	3	7	9	11	0.818	224	245	0.914	5th–8th place
5	Romania	5	1	4	6	5	14	0.357	206	264	0.780	
6	Greece	5	0	5	5	5	15	0.333	160	286	0.559	

Date	Time		Score		Set 1	Set 2	Set 3	Set 4	Set 5	Total	Report
24 Sep	14:30	Germany	3–0	Greece	15–4	15–5	15–7			45–16	Report
24 Sep	17:00	Ukraine	3–0	Russia	15–10	15–13	15–7			45–30	Report
24 Sep	20:00	Belarus	3–1	Romania	15–8	15–8	14–16	18–16		62–48	Report
25 Sep	14:30	Ukraine	3–0	Germany	15–9	15–8	15–5			45–22	Report
25 Sep	17:00	Russia	3–0	Belarus	15–5	15–5	15–6			45–16	Report
25 Sep	20:00	Romania	3–2	Greece	13–15	16–14	15–17	15–2	15–9	74–57	Report
26 Sep	14:30	Ukraine	3–1	Belarus	15–7	15–13	9–15	15–6		54–41	Report
26 Sep	17:00	Russia	3–1	Greece	15–5	10–15	15–7	15–3		55–30	Report
26 Sep	20:00	Germany	3–0	Romania	15–4	15–10	15–8			45–22	Report
28 Sep	14:30	Ukraine	3–1	Greece	15–5	15–2	12–15	15–6		57–28	Report
28 Sep	17:00	Russia	3–0	Romania	15–4	15–7	15–5			45–16	Report
28 Sep	20:00	Germany	3–2	Belarus	12–15	15–3	12–15	15–9	15–10	69–52	Report
29 Sep	14:30	Ukraine	3–1	Romania	15–7	15–12	10–15	15–12		55–46	Report
29 Sep	17:00	Russia	3–0	Germany	15–3	15–7	15–9			45–19	Report
29 Sep	20:00	Belarus	3–1	Greece	15–5	15–4	10–15	15–5		55–29	Report

== Final round ==
- venue location: Brno, Czech Republic
- All times are Central European Summer Time (UTC+02:00).

=== 5th–8th place ===
- Pools A and B third and fourth positions play each other.

Semifinals
1 Oct
Germany	3
Netherlands	2
1 Oct
Croatia	3
Belarus	0

5th place
2 Oct
Germany	3
Croatia	2
7th place
2 Oct
Netherlands	3
Belarus	0

==== 5th–8th semifinals ====
Date	Time		Score		Set 1	Set 2	Set 3	Set 4	Set 5	Total	Report
1 Oct	12:00	Croatia	3–0	Belarus	15–12	16–14	15–4			46–30	Report
1 Oct	14:30	Germany	3–2	Netherlands	15–12	13–15	15–4	15–17	15–11	73–59	Report

==== 7th place match ====
Date	Time		Score		Set 1	Set 2	Set 3	Set 4	Set 5	Total	Report
2 Oct	10:00	Netherlands	3–0	Belarus	15–10	15–13	15–12			45–35	Report

==== 5th place match ====
Date	Time		Score		Set 1	Set 2	Set 3	Set 4	Set 5	Total	Report
2 Oct	12:30	Germany	3–2	Croatia	15–9	13–15	13–15	15–9	15–9	71–57	Report

=== Final ===
- Pools A and B first and second positions play each other.

Semifinals
1 Oct
Italy	1
Russia	3
1 Oct
Czechoslovakia	3
Ukraine	2

Final
2 Oct
Russia	3
Czechoslovakia	0
3rd place
2 Oct
Italy	1
Ukraine	3

==== Semifinals ====
Date	Time		Score		Set 1	Set 2	Set 3	Set 4	Set 5	Total	Report
1 Oct	17:00	Czechoslovakia	3–2	Ukraine	14–16	15–5	15–11	6–15	22–20	72–67	Report
1 Oct	20:00	Russia	3–1	Italy	15–9	12–15	16–14	15–2		58–40	Report

==== 3rd place match ====
Date	Time		Score		Set 1	Set 2	Set 3	Set 4	Set 5	Total	Report
2 Oct	15:00	Ukraine	3–1	Italy	15–17	15–8	15–6	17–15		62–46	Report

==== Final ====
Date	Time		Score		Set 1	Set 2	Set 3	Set 4	Set 5	Total	Report
2 Oct	18:00	Russia	3–0	Czechoslovakia	17–15	15–3	15–6			47–24	Report

== Final ranking ==
Place	Team
1st place, gold medalist(s)	Russia
2nd place, silver medalist(s)	Czechoslovakia
3rd place, bronze medalist(s)	Ukraine
4.	Italy
5.	Germany
6.	Croatia
7.	Netherlands
8.	Belarus
9.	Bulgaria
9.	Latvia
9.	Romania
9.	Greece

1993 Women's European champions

Russia
14th title

Team Roster
Evgenya Artamonova, Elena Batoukhtina, Tatyana Gracheva, Maria Likhtenstein, Tatyana Menchova, Natalya Morozova, Marina Nikulina, Valentina Ogienko, Irina Smirnova, Elena Chebukina, Yulia Timonova, and Elizaveta Tishchenko.
Head coach: Nikolay Karpol.

== Individual awards ==
- MVP: Lucie Václavíková (CSK)
- Best spiker: Yevgeniya Artamonova (RUS)
- Best blocker: Tatiana Ilyina (UKR)
- Best scorer: Barbara Jelic (CRO)
- Best setter: Manuela Benelli (ITA)
- Best receiver: Darina MIfkova (ITA)
