= Benishe Roberts =

American volleyball player (born 1977)

Benishe Dillard-Roberts

Personal information
- Nickname: Bennie
- Nationality: American
- Born: August 20, 1977 (age 49)
- Height: 6 ft 2 in (188 cm)
- Spike: 124 in (315 cm)
- Block: 120 in (305 cm)

Volleyball information
- Number: 4 (national team)

National team
2001	United States

Benishe Dillard-Roberts (born August 20, 1977) is an American female volleyball player. She was part of the United States women's national volleyball team.

Dillard-Roberts attended Kent-Meridian High School where she led the volleyball team to three consecutive 4A state volleyball tournament berths, taking second in 1993 and third in 1994. She continued playing volleyball at the collegiate level for Long Beach State. In 1998 she helped lead her team to a 36–0 record and an NCAA volleyball championship. Dillard-Roberts was named NCAA Final Four all-tournament team that year.

After college, Dillard-Roberts played for the U.S. National Volleyball Team from 1999 to 2001 and was an alternate to the 2000 Olympic Games. While on the U.S. team, she participated in the 2001 FIVB Volleyball Women's World Grand Champions Cup.

Dillard-Roberts played professional volleyball for the St. Louis Quest and was named MVP of the league in 2002. She also played professionally in Italy, Puerto Rico, Switzerland and Spain.
