= Jennifer Whitehead =

American volleyball player and coach

Personal information
- Nationality: American
- Born: 7 March 1977 (age 49)
- Height: 1.93 m (6 ft 4 in)
- Spike: 315 cm (124 in)
- Block: 294 cm (116 in)

Volleyball information
- Number: 17

Jennifer Whitehead (born 7 March 1977) is an American volleyball player and coach.

She played for the United States women's national volleyball team at the 2001 FIVB Women's World Grand Champions Cup.

She played for Michigan State University, and the University of Florida. She coached for the USA Youth National Team, and Long Island University.
