= 2001 Women's European Volleyball Championship =

Tournament details
- Host country: Bulgaria
- Dates: 22 – 30 September
- Teams: 12
- Venue: Various (in 2 host cities)

Final positions
- Champions: Russia (17th title)

Tournament awards
- MVP: (Bulgaria) Antonina Zetova

The 2001 Women's European Volleyball Championship was the 22nd edition of the event, organised by Europe's governing volleyball body, the Confédération Européenne de Volleyball. It was hosted in Sofia and Varna, Bulgaria from 22 to 30 September 2001.

== Participating teams ==
Team	Method of qualification
Bulgaria	Hosts
Croatia	1999 edition second place
Czech Republic	Qualification Category A group 3 second
France	Qualification Category A group 1 winners
Germany	Qualification Category A group 3 winners
Greece	Qualification Category A second best third
Italy	1999 edition third place
Netherlands	Qualification Category A group 1 second
Poland	Qualification Category A group 2 second
Romania	Qualification Category A group 2 winners
Russia	1999 edition first place
Ukraine	Qualification Category A best third

== Format ==
The tournament was played in two different stages. In the first stage, the twelve participants were divided in two groups of six teams each. A single round-robin format was played within each group to determine the teams' group position. The second stage of the tournament consisted of two sets of semifinals to determine the tournament final ranking. The group stage firsts and seconds played the semifinals for 1st to 4th place, group stage thirds and fourths played the 5th to 8th place semifinals and the remaining four teams which finished group stages as fifth and sixth ended all tied in final ranking at 9th place. The pairing of the semifinals was made so teams played against the opposite group teams which finished in a different position (1st played against 2nd, 3rd played against 4th).

== Pools composition ==
Pool A	Pool B
Bulgaria	Croatia
Czech Republic	Germany
France	Italy
Greece	Netherlands
Romania	Poland
Russia	Ukraine

== Venues ==
Pool A and Final round	Pool B	Tournament host cities
Varna	Sofia	Tournament host cities

== Preliminary round ==
- All times are Eastern European Summer Time (UTC+03:00).

=== Pool A ===
- venue location: Varna, Bulgaria

Pos	Team	Pld	W	L	Pts	SW	SL	SR	SPW	SPL	SPR	Qualification
1	Russia	5	5	0	10	15	0	MAX	375	243	1.543	Semifinals
2	Bulgaria	5	4	1	9	12	7	1.714	416	397	1.048	Semifinals
3	Romania	5	3	2	8	10	7	1.429	376	370	1.016	5th–8th place
4	France	5	2	3	7	8	12	0.667	412	442	0.932	5th–8th place
5	Czech Republic	5	1	4	6	5	13	0.385	374	424	0.882	
6	Greece	5	0	5	5	4	15	0.267	377	454	0.830	

Date	Time		Score		Set 1	Set 2	Set 3	Set 4	Set 5	Total	Report
22 Sep	14:00	France	0–3	Russia	23–25	22–25	16–25			61–75	Report
22 Sep	16:15	Czech Republic	1–3	Romania	21–25	26–24	21–25	22–25		90–99	Report
22 Sep	18:30	Bulgaria	3–1	Greece	21–25	25–15	25–22	25–16		96–78	Report
23 Sep	14:00	France	3–1	Czech Republic	25–19	25–19	24–26	25–19		99–83	Report
23 Sep	16:15	Russia	3–0	Greece	25–13	25–20	25–19			75–52	Report
23 Sep	18:30	Romania	1–3	Bulgaria	20–25	25–16	20–25	17–25		82–91	Report
24 Sep	14:00	Czech Republic	0–3	Russia	12–25	15–25	13–25			40–75	Report
24 Sep	16:15	Greece	0–3	Romania	24–26	15–25	27–29			66–80	Report
24 Sep	18:30	Bulgaria	3–2	France	25–16	19–25	20–25	25–20	15–13	104–99	Report
26 Sep	14:00	Russia	3–0	Romania	25–17	25–13	25–10			75–40	Report
26 Sep	16:15	France	3–2	Greece	16–25	25–23	24–26	25–20	15–11	105–105	Report
26 Sep	18:30	Czech Republic	0–3	Bulgaria	19–25	21–25	23–25			63–75	Report
27 Sep	14:00	Romania	3–0	France	25–21	25–15	25–12			75–48	Report
27 Sep	16:15	Greece	1–3	Czech Republic	18–25	25–23	20–25	13–25		76–98	Report
27 Sep	18:30	Bulgaria	0–3	Russia	22–25	16–25	12–25			50–75	Report

=== Pool B ===
- venue location: Sofia, Bulgaria

Pos	Team	Pld	W	L	Pts	SW	SL	SR	SPW	SPL	SPR	Qualification
1	Italy	5	5	0	10	15	4	3.750	445	373	1.193	Semifinals
2	Ukraine	5	3	2	8	11	9	1.222	455	427	1.066	Semifinals
3	Netherlands	5	2	3	7	10	11	0.909	462	477	0.969	5th–8th place
4	Poland	5	2	3	7	9	10	0.900	405	423	0.957	5th–8th place
5	Croatia	5	2	3	7	7	12	0.583	410	440	0.932	
6	Germany	5	1	4	6	7	13	0.538	424	461	0.920	

Date	Time		Score		Set 1	Set 2	Set 3	Set 4	Set 5	Total	Report
22 Sep	14:00	Netherlands	1–3	Germany	26–24	22–25	15–25	18–25		81–99	Report
22 Sep	16:15	Italy	3–1	Poland	25–17	25–15	20–25	25–21		95–78	Report
22 Sep	18:30	Ukraine	3–0	Croatia	27–25	25–16	25–16			77–57	Report
23 Sep	14:00	Poland	3–1	Germany	19–25	25–19	26–24	25–16		95–84	Report
23 Sep	16:15	Italy	3–0	Ukraine	27–25	25–21	25–15			77–61	Report
23 Sep	18:30	Croatia	3–1	Netherlands	29–27	22–25	25–20	25–18		101–90	Report
24 Sep	14:00	Ukraine	3–2	Poland	25–14	19–25	23–25	25–16	15–11	107–91	Report
24 Sep	16:15	Netherlands	2–3	Italy	25–20	25–17	24–26	16–25	11–15	101–103	Report
24 Sep	18:30	Germany	2–3	Croatia	30–28	20–25	11–25	25–20	12–15	98–113	Report
26 Sep	14:00	Ukraine	2–3	Netherlands	25–20	20–25	29–31	25–22	14–16	113–114	Report
26 Sep	16:15	Italy	3–0	Germany	25–19	25–19	25–17			75–55	Report
26 Sep	18:30	Poland	3–0	Croatia	25–15	30–28	25–18			80–61	Report
27 Sep	14:00	Germany	1–3	Ukraine	23–25	25–22	19–25	21–25		88–97	Report
27 Sep	16:15	Croatia	1–3	Italy	22–25	25–20	17–25	14–25		78–95	Report
27 Sep	18:30	Netherlands	3–0	Poland	25–18	26–24	25–19			76–61	Report

== Final round ==
- venue location: Varna, Bulgaria
- All times are Eastern European Summer Time (UTC+03:00).

=== 5th–8th place ===
- Pools A and B third and fourth positions play each other.

Semifinals
29 Sep
Romania	0
Poland	3
29 Sep
France	2
Netherlands	3

5th place
30 Sep
Poland	2
Netherlands	3
7th place
30 Sep
Romania	3
France	1

==== 5th–8th semifinals ====
Date	Time		Score		Set 1	Set 2	Set 3	Set 4	Set 5	Total	Report
29 Sep	10:00	Romania	0–3	Poland	20–25	22–25	21–25			63–75	Report
29 Sep	12:30	France	2–3	Netherlands	26–24	23–25	25–27	25–21	11–15	110–112	Report

==== 7th place match ====
Date	Time		Score		Set 1	Set 2	Set 3	Set 4	Set 5	Total	Report
30 Sep	10:00	Romania	3–1	France	25–18	22–25	25–19	25–23		97–85	Report

==== 5th place match ====
Date	Time		Score		Set 1	Set 2	Set 3	Set 4	Set 5	Total	Report
30 Sep	12:30	Poland	2–3	Netherlands	22–25	25–22	19–25	25–21	9–15	100–108	Report

=== Final ===
- Pools A and B first and second positions play each other.

Semifinals
29 Sep
Russia	3
Ukraine	0
29 Sep
Bulgaria	0
Italy	3

Final
30 Sep
Russia	3
Italy	2
3rd place
30 Sep
Ukraine	1
Bulgaria	3

==== Semifinals ====
Date	Time		Score		Set 1	Set 2	Set 3	Set 4	Set 5	Total	Report
29 Sep	16:00	Russia	3–0	Ukraine	25–18	25–19	25–17			75–54	Report
29 Sep	18:30	Bulgaria	0–3	Italy	18–25	12–25	21–25			51–75	Report

==== 3rd place match ====
Date	Time		Score		Set 1	Set 2	Set 3	Set 4	Set 5	Total	Report
30 Sep	16:00	Ukraine	1–3	Bulgaria	23–25	25–22	21–25	21–25		90–97	Report

==== Final ====
Date	Time		Score		Set 1	Set 2	Set 3	Set 4	Set 5	Total	Report
30 Sep	18:30	Russia	3–2	Italy	21–25	25–23	25–23	18–25	15–6	104–102	Report

== Final ranking ==
Place	Team
1st place, gold medalist(s)	Russia
2nd place, silver medalist(s)	Italy
3rd place, bronze medalist(s)	Bulgaria
4	Ukraine
5	Netherlands
6	Poland
7	Romania
8	France
9	Croatia
9	Germany
9	Czech Republic
9	Greece

2001 Women's European champions

Russia
17th title

Team Roster
Evgenya Artamonova, Lioubov Chachkova, Ekaterina Gamova, Elena Godina, Tatyana Gracheva, Natalya Morozova, Elena Plotnikova, Olga Potachova, Inessa Sargsyan, Elizaveta Tichtchenko, Elena Tyurina and Elena Vassilevskaya.
Head coach: Nikolay Karpol.

== Individual awards ==
Players awarded for their performances in the tournament.

- MVP: Antonina Zetova (BUL)
- Best scorer: Antonina Zetova (BUL)
- Best spiker: Elizaveta Tichtchenko (RUS)
- Best server: Lyubov Sokolova (RUS)
- Best blocker: Manuela Leggeri (ITA)
- Best setter: Iryna Zhukova (UKR)
- Best receiver: Lyubov Sokolova (RUS)
- Best digger: Erna Brinkman (NED)
