= Danielle Scott-Arruda =

American indoor volleyball player (born 1972)

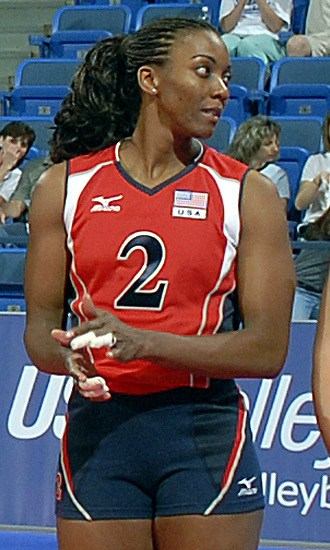

Personal information
- Full name: Danielle Racquel Scott-Arruda
- Born: October 1, 1972 (age 54); Baton Rouge, Louisiana, U.S.
- Height: 6 ft 2 in (188 cm)
- Spike: 325 cm (128 in)
- Block: 302 cm (119 in)
- Education: California State University, Long Beach

Volleyball information
- Position: Middle blocker
- Number: 2 (national team); 2 (Long Beach State)

Career
Years	Teams
1990–93; 1996–97; 1997–98; 2000–01; 2001–03; 2003–06; 2006–07; 2007–08; 2008–09; 2010–11; 2011–12; 2012–13	Long Beach State University; Gierre Roma; Leites Jundiaí; Osasco VC; Pioneer Red Wings; Chieri Volleyball; CD Macaé; Osasco VC; FV Castellana Grotte; BMG/São Bernardo; BMG/São Bernardo; Banana Boat/Praia Clube

National team
1994–2012	United States
Medal record
Women's volleyball
Representing the United States
Olympic Games
Silver medal – second place	2008 Beijing	Team
Silver medal – second place	2012 London	Team
World Championship
Silver medal – second place	2002 Germany	Team
FIVB World Cup
Silver medal – second place	2011 Japan	Team
Bronze medal – third place	2003 Japan	Team
Bronze medal – third place	2007 Japan	Team
FIVB World Grand Prix
Gold medal – first place	2001 Macau	Team
Gold medal – first place	2012 Ningbo	Team
Bronze medal – third place	2003 Andria	Team
Bronze medal – third place	2004 Reggio Calabria	Team
Goodwill Games
Silver medal – second place	1994 Saint Petersburg	Team
Pan American Games
Silver medal – second place	1995 Mar del Plata	Team
Bronze medal – third place	1999 Winnipeg	Team
Bronze medal – third place	2003 Santo Domingo	Team
Bronze medal – third place	2007 Rio de Janeiro	Team
NORCECA Championship
Gold medal – first place	2001 Santo Domingo
Gold medal – first place	2003 Santo Domingo
Gold medal – first place	2005 Port of Spain
Gold medal – first place	2011 Caguas
Silver medal – second place	1999 Monterrey
Silver medal – second place	2007 Winnipeg

Danielle Racquel Scott-Arruda (born October 1, 1972) is an American former volleyball player. She played at the 1996, 2000, 2004, 2008, and the 2012 Summer Olympics, breaking a U.S. female volleyball athlete record for Olympic appearances.

For her lifetime achievements in the sport, Scott-Arruda was inducted into the International Volleyball Hall of Fame in 2016.

== Early life ==
Scott-Arruda was born in Baton Rouge, Louisiana. She attended Woodlawn High School in Baton Rouge, where she was an All-State athlete in volleyball and basketball.

== College ==
Scott-Arruda played volleyball for Long Beach State. In 1991, she helped Long Beach State to the NCAA Championship match. In 1992, she was the Big West Conference Player of the Year and helped Long Beach State to the NCAA semifinals. In 1993, Scott-Arruda led the 49ers to the NCAA National Championship. She was American Volleyball Coaches Association (AVCA) All-Northwest Region and the Big West Conference Player of the Year, as she led the nation in hitting percentage. She was also the National Player of the Year. In 1994, she won the Honda-Broderick Award (now the Honda Sports Award) as the nation's best female collegiate volleyball player.

In Scott-Arruda's collegiate career, she posted 1,778 kills, 693 digs, and 604 blocks in volleyball. She was a three-time AVCA All-American. She also earned All-Big West honors in basketball, becoming the first Big West student-athlete to earn all-conference accolades in two sports in one season.

In 1999, Scott-Arruda was inducted into the Long Beach State Hall of Fame.

== International competition ==
In her first major international competition, Scott-Arruda won a silver medal at the 1994 Goodwill Games in Saint Petersburg. In her career, she played in over 420 matches and won numerous medals, winning silver medals at the 2002 FIVB World Championship in Germany, the 2008 Summer Olympics in Beijing, and the 2012 Summer Olympics in London. She reportedly had a spike height of 128 inches (3.25 meters).

Scott-Arruda carried the flag for the United States at the opening ceremony of the 2007 Pan American Games in Rio de Janeiro.

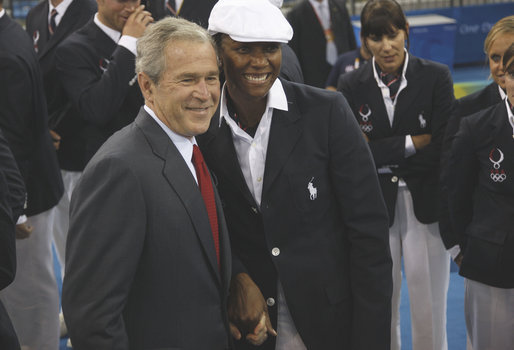
Arruda with George W. Bush at 2008 Summer Olympics opening ceremony

== Sports Diplomacy ==
In 2019, Scott-Arruda visited Fiji as a Sports Envoy for the U.S. State Department's Sports Diplomacy Office.

== Personal life ==
Scott-Arruda's parents are Charles Young and Vera Scott. She has one brother, Charles, and one sister, Stefanie. She was married to Eduardo Arruda, a former member of the Brazilian national team and they have a daughter Juliánné Arruda who is now 14 as of 2024. She learned to speak Portuguese fluently while living in Brazil.

== Individual awards ==
- Three-time AVCA All-American
- 1994 Honda-Broderick Award
- 1999 Long Beach State Hall of Fame
- 2000 Summer Olympics "Best Blocker"
- 2001 FIVB World Grand Prix "Most Valuable Player"
- 2001 FIVB World Grand Prix "Best Scorer"
- 2001 FIVB World Grand Prix "Best Blocker"
- 2002 World Championship "Best Blocker"
- 2009 Pan-American Cup "Best Blocker"
- 2016 International Volleyball Hall of Fame

Awards
Preceded by (Russia) Lyubov Sokolova	Most Valuable Player of FIVB World Grand Prix; 2001	Succeeded by (Russia) Yevgeniya Artamonova
Preceded by (Russia) Lyubov Sokolova	Best Scorer of FIVB World Grand Prix; 2001	Succeeded by (China) Yang Hao
Preceded by (Russia) Yekaterina Gamova	Best Blocker of FIVB World Grand Prix; 2001	Succeeded by (Brazil) Valeska Menezes
