= 2002 FIVB Volleyball World Grand Prix =

International women's volleyball tournament

2002 FIVB World Grand Prix
Tournament details
- Host country: Hong Kong (Final)
- Dates: 12 July – 4 August
- Teams: 8
- Venue: 1 (in 1 host city)

Final positions
- Champions: Russia (5th title)

Tournament awards
- MVP: Yevgeniya Artamonova (RUS)

The 2002 FIVB World Grand Prix was the tenth women's volleyball tournament of its kind. The event was held over four weeks in three countries and six cities throughout Asia: Philippines, Thailand, PR China, Chinese Taipei and Japan, culminating with the final round at Hong Kong Coliseum in Hong Kong from 1 to 4 August 2002.

== Competing nations ==
=== Qualification process ===
| Europe | America | Asia |
|---|---|---|
| Germany; Russia | Brazil; Cuba; United States | China; Japan; Thailand |

== Calendar ==
Week 1 12–14 July 2002
| Group A: Tokyo Japan | Group B: Chengdu China |
|---|---|
| Germany; Brazil; Japan; Thailand | China; Cuba; Russia; United States |
Week 2 26–28 July 2002
| Group C: Manila Philippines | Group D: Nakhon Ratchasima Thailand |
| Brazil; Germany; Japan; Russia | China; Cuba; Thailand; United States |
Week 3 19–21 July 2002
| Group E: Macau Macau | Group F: Miaoli Chinese Taipei |
| Brazil; Germany; China; Thailand | Cuba; Japan; Russia; United States |
Week 4 Final Round 1 – 4 August 2002
Hong Kong
China Brazil; Germany; Russia

== Preliminary round ==
=== Ranking ===
The host China and top four teams in the preliminary round advance to the final round.

| Pos | Team | Pld | W | L | Pts | SW | SL | SR | SPW | SPL | SPR | Qualification |
|---|---|---|---|---|---|---|---|---|---|---|---|---|
| 1 | China (Note: Qualified as hosts) (H) | 9 | 8 | 1 | 17 | 24 | 4 | 6.000 | 685 | 551 | 1.243 | Final round |
| 2 | Russia | 9 | 8 | 1 | 17 | 26 | 9 | 2.889 | 797 | 683 | 1.167 | Final round |
| 3 | Germany | 9 | 5 | 4 | 14 | 17 | 14 | 1.214 | 688 | 667 | 1.031 | Final round |
| 4 | Brazil | 9 | 5 | 4 | 14 | 18 | 15 | 1.200 | 743 | 711 | 1.045 | Final round |
| 5 | Japan | 9 | 4 | 5 | 13 | 13 | 18 | 0.722 | 684 | 699 | 0.979 | |
| 6 | United States | 9 | 3 | 6 | 12 | 16 | 20 | 0.800 | 779 | 798 | 0.976 | |
| 7 | Cuba | 9 | 3 | 6 | 12 | 11 | 22 | 0.500 | 698 | 775 | 0.901 | |
| 8 | Thailand | 9 | 0 | 9 | 9 | 4 | 27 | 0.148 | 566 | 756 | 0.749 | |

(H) Host

=== First round ===
==== Group A ====
- Venue: Yoyogi National Stadium, Tokyo, Japan

| Date | | Score | | Set 1 | Set 2 | Set 3 | Set 4 | Set 5 | Total |
|---|---|---|---|---|---|---|---|---|---|
| 12 Jul | Brazil | 3–2 | Germany | 25–19 | 25–22 | 19–25 | 19–25 | 15–8 | 103–99 |
| 12 Jul | Japan | 3–0 | Thailand | 25–14 | 25–18 | 25–13 | | | 75–45 |
| 13 Jul | Brazil | 3–1 | Thailand | 25–21 | 25–27 | 25–22 | 27–25 | | 102–95 |
| 13 Jul | Japan | 0–3 | Germany | 20–25 | 19–25 | 21–25 | | | 60–75 |
| 14 Jul | Germany | 3–0 | Thailand | 25–17 | 25–21 | 25–15 | | | 75–53 |
| 14 Jul | Japan | 0–3 | Brazil | 24–26 | 20–25 | 25–27 | | | 69–78 |

==== Group B ====
- Venue: Sichuan Provincial Gymnasium, Chengdu, China

| Date | | Score | | Set 1 | Set 2 | Set 3 | Set 4 | Set 5 | Total |
|---|---|---|---|---|---|---|---|---|---|
| 12 Jul | United States | 2–3 | Russia | 23–25 | 25–12 | 23–25 | 25–22 | 9–15 | 105–99 |
| 12 Jul | China | 3–0 | Cuba | 25–15 | 25–23 | 25–18 | | | 75–56 |
| 13 Jul | Cuba | 1–3 | Russia | 25–14 | 18–25 | 16–25 | 20–25 | | 79–89 |
| 13 Jul | China | 3–0 | United States | 25–19 | 25–17 | 25–17 | | | 75–53 |
| 14 Jul | Cuba | 1–3 | United States | 25–21 | 18–25 | 26–28 | 18–25 | | 87–99 |
| 14 Jul | China | 0–3 | Russia | 19–25 | 19–25 | 22–25 | | | 60–75 |

=== Second round ===
==== Group C ====
- Venue: Araneta Coliseum, Quezon City, Philippines

| Date | | Score | | Set 1 | Set 2 | Set 3 | Set 4 | Set 5 | Total |
|---|---|---|---|---|---|---|---|---|---|
| 19 Jul | Japan | 0–3 | Brazil | 18–25 | 23–25 | 25–27 | | | 66–77 |
| 19 Jul | Russia | 3–0 | Germany | 25–16 | 26–24 | 25–15 | | | 76–55 |
| 20 Jul | Russia | 3–1 | Japan | 25–13 | 25–10 | 23–25 | 25–19 | | 98–67 |
| 20 Jul | Germany | 3–0 | Brazil | 25–18 | 25–18 | 25–22 | | | 75–58 |
| 21 Jul | Germany | 0–3 | Japan | 26–28 | 21–25 | 19–25 | | | 66–78 |
| 21 Jul | Brazil | 0–3 | Russia | 21–25 | 15–25 | 21–25 | | | 57–75 |

==== Group D ====
- Venue: M.C.C. Hall, Nakhon Ratchasima, Thailand

| Date | | Score | | Set 1 | Set 2 | Set 3 | Set 4 | Set 5 | Total |
|---|---|---|---|---|---|---|---|---|---|
| 19 Jul | United States | 0–3 | China | 22–25 | 17–25 | 18–25 | | | 57–75 |
| 19 Jul | Thailand | 2–3 | Cuba | 25–18 | 26–28 | 25–23 | 15–25 | 16–18 | 107–112 |
| 20 Jul | Cuba | 0–3 | China | 28–30 | 23–25 | 16–25 | | | 67–80 |
| 20 Jul | Thailand | 1–3 | United States | 17–25 | 25–17 | 21–25 | 20–25 | | 83–92 |
| 21 Jul | United States | 3–0 | Cuba | 25–21 | 25–17 | 28–26 | | | 78–64 |
| 21 Jul | China | 3–0 | Thailand | 25–14 | 25–14 | 25–15 | | | 75–43 |

=== Third round ===
==== Group E ====
- Venue: Macau Forum, Macau

| Date | | Score | | Set 1 | Set 2 | Set 3 | Set 4 | Set 5 | Total |
|---|---|---|---|---|---|---|---|---|---|
| 26 Jul | Brazil | 3–0 | Thailand | 25–10 | 25–16 | 25–12 | | | 75–38 |
| 26 Jul | China | 3–0 | Germany | 25–23 | 26–24 | 25–21 | | | 76–68 |
| 27 Jul | Brazil | 2–3 | Germany | 25–23 | 23–25 | 20–25 | 25–12 | 13–15 | 106–100 |
| 27 Jul | China | 3–0 | Thailand | 25–16 | 25–11 | 25–18 | | | 75–45 |
| 28 Jul | Thailand | 0–3 | Germany | 19–25 | 20–25 | 18–25 | | | 57–75 |
| 28 Jul | China | 3–1 | Brazil | 25–23 | 25–21 | 19–25 | 25–18 | | 94–87 |

==== Group F ====
- Venue: Miao Li County Dome, Miaoli, Taiwan

| Date | | Score | | Set 1 | Set 2 | Set 3 | Set 4 | Set 5 | Total |
|---|---|---|---|---|---|---|---|---|---|
| 26 Jul | United States | 2–3 | Cuba | 26–28 | 25–18 | 20–25 | 25–19 | 11–15 | 107–105 |
| 26 Jul | Russia | 2–3 | Japan | 25–21 | 25–21 | 17–25 | 22–25 | 8–15 | 97–107 |
| 27 Jul | Japan | 3–1 | United States | 25–22 | 25–18 | 22–25 | 25–23 | | 97–88 |
| 27 Jul | Cuba | 0–3 | Russia | 18–25 | 17–25 | 18–25 | | | 53–75 |
| 28 Jul | Cuba | 3–0 | Japan | 25–20 | 25–23 | 25–22 | | | 75–65 |
| 28 Jul | United States | 2–3 | Russia | 18–25 | 24–26 | 26–24 | 25–23 | 7–15 | 100–113 |

== Final round ==
- Venue: Hong Kong Coliseum, Hong Kong

=== Round Robin ===
| Pos | Team | Pld | W | L | Pts | SW | SL | SR | SPW | SPL | SPR | Qualification |
|---|---|---|---|---|---|---|---|---|---|---|---|---|
| 1 | China | 3 | 2 | 1 | 5 | 8 | 4 | 2.000 | 251 | 246 | 1.020 | Final |
| 2 | Russia | 3 | 2 | 1 | 5 | 6 | 5 | 1.200 | 252 | 215 | 1.172 | Final |
| 3 | Brazil | 3 | 1 | 2 | 4 | 4 | 6 | 0.667 | 228 | 238 | 0.958 | |
| 4 | Germany | 3 | 1 | 2 | 4 | 3 | 6 | 0.500 | 187 | 200 | 0.935 | |

| Date | | Score | | Set 1 | Set 2 | Set 3 | Set 4 | Set 5 | Total |
|---|---|---|---|---|---|---|---|---|---|
| 1 Ago | Russia | 3–0 | Germany | 25–19 | 25–15 | 25–22 | | | 75–56 |
| 1 Ago | China | 3–1 | Brazil | 25–21 | 25–18 | 18–25 | 25–19 | | 93–83 |
| 2 Ago | Germany | 3–0 | Brazil | 25–23 | 25–23 | 25–23 | | | 75–69 |
| 2 Ago | Russia | 3–2 | China | 23–25 | 25–10 | 19–25 | 25–13 | 15–10 | 107–83 |
| 3 Ago | Brazil | 3–0 | Russia | 25–23 | 25–23 | 26–24 | | | 76–70 |
| 3 Ago | China | 3–0 | Germany | 25–17 | 25–20 | 25–19 | | | 75–56 |

=== 3rd place match ===
| Date | | Score | | Set 1 | Set 2 | Set 3 | Set 4 | Set 5 | Total |
|---|---|---|---|---|---|---|---|---|---|
| 4 Ago | Germany | 3–1 | Brazil | 18–25 | 25–17 | 28–26 | 25–16 | | 96–84 |

=== Final ===
| Date | | Score | | Set 1 | Set 2 | Set 3 | Set 4 | Set 5 | Total |
|---|---|---|---|---|---|---|---|---|---|
| 4 Ago | Russia | 3–1 | China | 29–27 | 23–25 | 25–20 | 25–21 | | 102–93 |

== Final standings ==
| Place | Team |
|---|---|
| 1st place, gold medalist(s) | Russia |
| 2nd place, silver medalist(s) | China |
| 3rd place, bronze medalist(s) | Germany |
| 4 | Brazil |
| 5 | Japan |
| 6 | United States |
| 7 | Cuba |
| 8 | Thailand |

2002 FIVB World Grand Prix winners

Russia
Third title

Team roster
Natalia Morozova, Anastasia Belikova, Alexandra Korukovets, Elena Godina, Natalia Safronova, Yevgeniya Artamonova, Yelizaveta Tishchenko, Ekaterina Gamova, Tatiana Gratcheva (c), Elena Plotnikova, Anjela Gourieva and Olga Chukanova.
Head coach
Nikolai Karpol

== Individual awards ==
- Most valuable player:
  - Evguenia Artamonova (RUS)
- Best spiker:
  - Elizaveta Tichtchenko (RUS)
- Best blocker:
  - Valeska Menezes (BRA)
- Best server:
  - Yang Hao (CHN)
- Best libero:
  - Fabiana Oliveira (BRA)

=== Statistical leaders ===
- Best scorer:
  - Yang Hao (CHN)
- Best digger:
  - Sylvia Roll (GER)
- Best setter:
  - Marcelle Rodrigues (BRA)
- Best receiver:
  - Zhou Suhong (CHN)
