= 2003 FIVB Volleyball World Grand Prix =

International women's volleyball tournament

2003 FIVB World Grand Prix
Tournament details
- Host country: Italy
- Dates: 21 July – 3 August
- Teams: 12
- Venue: 1 (in 1 host city)

Final positions
- Champions: China (1st title)
- Runners-up: Russia
- Third place: United States

Tournament awards
- MVP: Paola Cardullo (ITA)

The FIVB World Grand Prix 2003 was the eleventh edition of the annual women's volleyball tournament, which is the female equivalent of the Men's Volleyball World League. The 2003 edition was played by twelve countries from July 21 to August 3, 2003 with the final round held in Andria, Italy. Hosts Italy and the top five ranked teams after the preliminary rounds qualified for the last round.

== Competing nations ==
=== Qualification process ===
| Europe | America | Asia |
|---|---|---|
| Germany; Italy; Netherlands; Russia | Brazil; Canada; Cuba; United States | China; Japan; South Korea; Thailand |

== Calendar ==
| Group A | Group B |
|---|---|
| Site : Gioia del Colle, Matera Italy Germany; Cuba; Italy; Japan; Netherlands; United States | Site : Matera, Gioia del Colle Italy Brazil; Canada; China; South Korea; Russia; Thailand |

== Preliminary round ==
=== Group A ===
| Pos | Team | Pld | W | L | Pts | SW | SL | SR | SPW | SPL | SPR | Qualification |
|---|---|---|---|---|---|---|---|---|---|---|---|---|
| 1 | United States | 5 | 4 | 1 | 9 | 14 | 6 | 2.333 | 459 | 413 | 1.111 | Final round |
| 2 | Netherlands | 5 | 4 | 1 | 9 | 12 | 9 | 1.333 | 451 | 441 | 1.023 | Final round |
| 3 | Italy | 5 | 2 | 3 | 7 | 12 | 12 | 1.000 | 522 | 494 | 1.057 | Final round |
| 4 | Germany | 5 | 2 | 3 | 7 | 10 | 11 | 0.909 | 484 | 466 | 1.039 | |
| 5 | Japan | 5 | 2 | 3 | 7 | 9 | 13 | 0.692 | 438 | 486 | 0.901 | |
| 6 | Cuba | 5 | 1 | 4 | 6 | 8 | 14 | 0.571 | 434 | 488 | 0.889 | |

| Date | | Score | | Set 1 | Set 2 | Set 3 | Set 4 | Set 5 | Total |
|---|---|---|---|---|---|---|---|---|---|
| 21 Jul | Japan | 0–3 | Netherlands | 16–25 | 18–25 | 19–25 | | | 53–75 |
| 21 Jul | Germany | 1–3 | Italy | 26–24 | 22–25 | 19–25 | 22–25 | | 89–99 |
| 21 Jul | United States | 3–0 | Cuba | 25–22 | 25–19 | 25–14 | | | 75–55 |
| 22 Jul | Japan | 2–3 | United States | 26–24 | 17–25 | 15–25 | 25–23 | 12–15 | 95–112 |
| 22 Jul | Cuba | 1–3 | Germany | 16–25 | 14–25 | 25–22 | 16–25 | | 71–97 |
| 22 Jul | Netherlands | 3–2 | Italy | 16–25 | 25–20 | 27–25 | 15–25 | 15–8 | 98–103 |
| 23 Jul | United States | 3–0 | Netherlands | 25–23 | 25–20 | 25–15 | | | 75–58 |
| 23 Jul | Germany | 3–1 | Japan | 25–13 | 17–25 | 26–24 | 25–21 | | 93–83 |
| 23 Jul | Italy | 2–3 | Cuba | 25–16 | 25–22 | 25–27 | 20–25 | 12–15 | 107–105 |
| 25 Jul | Netherlands | 3–2 | Cuba | 23–25 | 19–25 | 25–23 | 25–16 | 15–13 | 107–102 |
| 25 Jul | United States | 3–1 | Germany | 25–21 | 25–20 | 17–25 | 33–31 | | 100–97 |
| 25 Jul | Japan | 3–2 | Italy | 23–25 | 16–25 | 25–21 | 26–24 | 15–10 | 105–105 |
| 26 Jul | Cuba | 2–3 | Japan | 25–18 | 18–25 | 20–25 | 25–19 | 13–15 | 101–102 |
| 26 Jul | Germany | 2–3 | Netherlands | 21–25 | 28–26 | 25–22 | 21–25 | 13–15 | 108–113 |
| 26 Jul | Italy | 3–2 | United States | 23–25 | 20–25 | 25–23 | 25–15 | 15–9 | 108–97 |

=== Group B ===
| Pos | Team | Pld | W | L | Pts | SW | SL | SR | SPW | SPL | SPR | Qualification |
|---|---|---|---|---|---|---|---|---|---|---|---|---|
| 1 | South Korea | 5 | 4 | 1 | 9 | 12 | 5 | 2.400 | 401 | 352 | 1.139 | Final round |
| 2 | Russia | 5 | 4 | 1 | 9 | 13 | 6 | 2.167 | 446 | 395 | 1.129 | Final round |
| 3 | China | 5 | 3 | 2 | 8 | 11 | 6 | 1.833 | 411 | 344 | 1.195 | Final round |
| 4 | Brazil | 5 | 3 | 2 | 8 | 11 | 7 | 1.571 | 398 | 369 | 1.079 | |
| 5 | Thailand | 5 | 1 | 4 | 6 | 3 | 13 | 0.231 | 281 | 391 | 0.719 | |
| 6 | Canada | 5 | 0 | 5 | 5 | 2 | 15 | 0.133 | 330 | 416 | 0.793 | |

| Date | | Score | | Set 1 | Set 2 | Set 3 | Set 4 | Set 5 | Total |
|---|---|---|---|---|---|---|---|---|---|
| 21 Jul | Thailand | 0–3 | Brazil | 10–25 | 17–25 | 11–25 | | | 38–75 |
| 21 Jul | China | 3–0 | Canada | 25–22 | 25–14 | 25–15 | | | 75–51 |
| 21 Jul | South Korea | 3–1 | Russia | 25–19 | 19–25 | 25–18 | 31–29 | | 100–91 |
| 22 Jul | Russia | 3–0 | Thailand | 25–18 | 25–21 | 25–19 | | | 75–58 |
| 22 Jul | Canada | 0–3 | Brazil | 23–25 | 18–25 | 20–25 | | | 61–75 |
| 22 Jul | China | 3–0 | South Korea | 29–27 | 25–8 | 25–23 | | | 79–58 |
| 23 Jul | Thailand | 0–3 | China | 11–25 | 22–25 | 10–25 | | | 43–75 |
| 23 Jul | South Korea | 3–1 | Canada | 25–18 | 18–25 | 25–13 | 25–23 | | 93–79 |
| 23 Jul | Brazil | 2–3 | Russia | 16–25 | 25–20 | 17–25 | 25–21 | 13–15 | 96–106 |
| 25 Jul | Canada | 0–3 | Russia | 17–25 | 17–25 | 14–25 | | | 48–75 |
| 25 Jul | South Korea | 3–0 | Thailand | 25–21 | 25–13 | 25–10 | | | 75–44 |
| 25 Jul | China | 1–3 | Brazil | 22–25 | 25–17 | 24–26 | 18–25 | | 89–93 |
| 26 Jul | Russia | 3–1 | China | 25–23 | 21–25 | 25–19 | 28–26 | | 99–93 |
| 26 Jul | Thailand | 3–1 | Canada | 28–26 | 25–18 | 20–25 | 25–22 | | 98–91 |
| 26 Jul | Brazil | 0–3 | South Korea | 20–25 | 21–25 | 18–25 | | | 59–75 |

== Final round ==
=== Pool Final ===
| Date | | Score | | Set 1 | Set 2 | Set 3 | Set 4 | Set 5 | Total |
|---|---|---|---|---|---|---|---|---|---|
| 28 Jul | Italy | 2–3 | Netherlands | 25–23 | 25–23 | 34–36 | 24–26 | 17–19 | 125–127 |
| 28 Jul | Russia | 3–0 | South Korea | 25–15 | 25–23 | 25–16 | | | 75–54 |
| 28 Jul | United States | 0–3 | China | 21–25 | 24–26 | 26–28 | | | 71–79 |
| 29 Jul | Netherlands | 0–3 | Russia | 22–25 | 18–25 | 15–25 | | | 55–75 |
| 29 Jul | China | 3–0 | South Korea | 25–17 | 25–14 | 25–23 | | | 75–54 |
| 29 Jul | United States | 3–0 | Italy | 25–19 | 25–19 | 26–24 | | | 76–62 |
| 30 Jul | Italy | 1–3 | China | 22–25 | 25–23 | 15–25 | 20–25 | | 82–98 |
| 30 Jul | Russia | 3–1 | United States | 25–19 | 21–25 | 25–21 | 25–17 | | 96–82 |
| 30 Jul | South Korea | 2–3 | Netherlands | 25–18 | 25–23 | 21–25 | 20–25 | 20–22 | 111–113 |
| 2 Ago | China | 3–1 | Netherlands | 25–19 | 25–20 | 25–27 | 25–17 | | 100–83 |
| 2 Ago | Italy | 1–3 | Russia | 25–20 | 15–25 | 20–25 | 17–25 | | 77–95 |
| 2 Ago | United States | 3–0 | South Korea | 30–28 | 25–21 | 25–17 | | | 80–66 |
| 3 Ago | Netherlands | 0–3 | United States | 22–25 | 20–25 | 26–28 | | | 68–78 |
| 3 Ago | South Korea | 1–3 | Italy | 19–25 | 17–25 | 25–22 | 13–25 | | 74–97 |
| 3 Ago | Russia | 0–3 | China | 22–25 | 26–28 | 21–25 | | | 69–78 |

=== Final ranking ===
| Pos | Team | Pld | W | L | Pts | SW | SL | SR | SPW | SPL | SPR |
|---|---|---|---|---|---|---|---|---|---|---|---|
| 1 | China | 5 | 5 | 0 | 10 | 15 | 2 | 7.500 | 430 | 359 | 1.198 |
| 2 | Russia | 5 | 4 | 1 | 9 | 12 | 5 | 2.400 | 410 | 346 | 1.185 |
| 3 | United States | 5 | 3 | 2 | 8 | 10 | 6 | 1.667 | 387 | 371 | 1.043 |
| 4 | Netherlands | 5 | 2 | 3 | 7 | 7 | 13 | 0.538 | 446 | 489 | 0.912 |
| 5 | Italy | 5 | 1 | 4 | 6 | 7 | 13 | 0.538 | 443 | 470 | 0.943 |
| 6 | South Korea | 5 | 0 | 5 | 5 | 3 | 15 | 0.200 | 359 | 440 | 0.816 |

== Overall ranking ==
| Place | Team |
|---|---|
| 1st place, gold medalist(s) | China |
| 2nd place, silver medalist(s) | Russia |
| 3rd place, bronze medalist(s) | United States |
| 4. | Netherlands |
| 5. | Italy |
| 6. | South Korea |
| 7 | Brazil |
| 7 | Germany |
| 9 | Japan |
| 9 | Thailand |
| 11 | Canada |
| 11 | Cuba |

2003 FIVB Women's World Grand Prix winners

China
First title

Team roster
Feng Kun (c), Yang Hao, Liu Yanan, Chu Jinling, Li Shan, Zhou Suhong, Zhao Ruirui, Zhang Yuehong, Chen Jing, Song Nina, Wang Lina and Zhang Na.
Head coach
Chen Zhonghe

== Individual awards ==
- Most valuable player:
  - Paola Cardullo (ITA)
- Best scorer:
  - Ekaterina Gamova (RUS)
- Best spiker:
  - Evguenia Artamonova (RUS)
- Best blocker:
  - Anastasia Belikova (RUS)
- Best server:
  - Yang Hao (CHN)
- Best setter:
  - Fernanda Venturini (BRA)

== Dream Team ==
- Setter:
  - Fernanda Venturini (BRA)
- Middle Blockers:
  - Danielle Scott (USA)
  - Zhao Ruirui (CHN)
- Outside Hitters:
  - Yevgeniya Artamonova (RUS)
  - Yang Hao (CHN)
- Opposite Spiker:
  - Zhou Suhong (CHN)
