= 2001 FIVB Volleyball World Grand Prix =

International women's volleyball tournament

2001 FIVB World Grand Prix
Tournament details
- Host country: Macau (Group 1 Final)
- Teams: 8
- Venue: 1 (in 1 host city)

Final positions
- Champions: United States (2nd title)

Tournament awards
- MVP: (United States) Danielle Scott

The 2001 FIVB World Grand Prix was the ninth women's volleyball tournament of its kind.

== Preliminary round ==
=== Ranking ===
Pos	Team	Pld	W	L	Pts	SW	SL	SR	SPW	SPL	SPR
1	China	9	8	1	17	24	10	2.400	825	706	1.169
2	United States	9	6	3	15	21	14	1.500	778	759	1.025
3	Brazil	9	6	3	15	21	18	1.167	847	842	1.006
4	Russia	9	5	4	14	20	13	1.538	772	682	1.132
5	Japan	9	5	4	14	19	14	1.357	763	764	0.999
6	Cuba	9	4	5	13	17	19	0.895	778	812	0.958
7	South Korea	9	1	8	10	9	24	0.375	676	780	0.867
8	Germany	9	1	8	10	7	26	0.269	699	793	0.881

=== First round ===
==== Group A ====
- Venue: Suphanburi, Thailand

Date		Score		Set 1	Set 2	Set 3	Set 4	Set 5	Total
3 Ago	Germany	0–3	Russia	17–25	18–25	21–25			56–75
3 Ago	United States	0–3	South Korea	17–25	23–25	23–25			63–75
4 Ago	United States	3–0	Germany	28–26	25–19	25–16			78–61
4 Ago	South Korea	0–3	Russia	23–25	12–25	13–25			48–75
5 Ago	Germany	3–2	South Korea	25–19	22–25	25–23	20–25	22–20	114–112
5 Ago	United States	3–0	Russia	25–23	25–23	25–17			75–63

==== Group B ====
- Venue: Kowloon, Hong Kong

Date		Score		Set 1	Set 2	Set 3	Set 4	Set 5	Total
3 Ago	China	0–3	Japan	19–25	28–30	23–25			70–80
3 Ago	Cuba	2–3	Brazil	25–16	18–25	25–22	13–25	7–15	88–103
4 Ago	Cuba	1–3	Japan	23–25	25–16	16–25	21–25		85–91
4 Ago	China	3–2	Brazil	26–28	26–24	25–22	27–29	15–8	119–111
5 Ago	Japan	3–0	Brazil	25–21	26–24	25–17			76–62
5 Ago	China	3–0	Cuba	25–20	25–17	25–22			75–59

=== Second round ===
==== Group C ====
- Venue: Harbin, China

Date		Score		Set 1	Set 2	Set 3	Set 4	Set 5	Total
10 Ago	China	3–1	Japan	21–25	25–17	25–11	25–19		96–72
10 Ago	Germany	2–3	Brazil	20–25	25–27	25–17	25–22	8–15	103–106
11 Ago	China	3–0	Germany	25–22	26–24	25–17			76–63
11 Ago	Japan	1–3	Brazil	25–18	23–25	18–25	26–28		92–96
12 Ago	Germany	1–3	Japan	25–27	17–25	28–26	22–25		92–103
12 Ago	China	3–1	Brazil	25–21	25–18	23–25	25–15		98–79

==== Group D ====
- Venue: Kaohsiung, Taiwan

Date		Score		Set 1	Set 2	Set 3	Set 4	Set 5	Total
10 Ago	Russia	3–0	South Korea	25–22	25–23	25–16			75–61
10 Ago	United States	2–3	Cuba	17–25	25–22	25–21	23–25	11–15	101–108
11 Ago	Russia	2–3	United States	20–25	25–17	22–25	25–20	13–15	105–102
11 Ago	Cuba	3–1	South Korea	25–20	25–27	25–17	25–18		100–82
12 Ago	United States	3–2	South Korea	28–26	23–25	25–19	19–25	15–8	110–103
12 Ago	Cuba	3–1	Russia	16–25	25–22	26–24	25–22		92–93

=== Third round ===
==== Group E ====
- Venue: Harbin, China

Date		Score		Set 1	Set 2	Set 3	Set 4	Set 5	Total
17 Ago	Cuba	3–0	Germany	25–19	25–23	25–23			75–65
17 Ago	China	3–1	United States	25–18	22–25	25–16	25–14		97–73
18 Ago	China	3–1	Germany	25–19	18–25	25–19	25–22		93–85
18 Ago	Cuba	1–3	United States	18–25	25–27	26–24	18–25		87–101
19 Ago	Germany	0–3	United States	22–25	19–25	19–25			60–75
19 Ago	China	3–1	Cuba	25–23	25–10	23–25	28–26		101–84

==== Group F ====
- Venue: Tokyo, Japan

Date		Score		Set 1	Set 2	Set 3	Set 4	Set 5	Total
17 Ago	Brazil	3–1	South Korea	25–19	18–25	25–20	25–19		93–83
17 Ago	Japan	1–3	Russia	25–23	22–25	18–25	31–33		96–106
18 Ago	South Korea	0–3	Russia	21–25	14–25	15–25			50–75
18 Ago	Japan	1–3	Brazil	19–25	16–25	25–20	18–25		78–95
19 Ago	Russia	2–3	Brazil	25–15	22–25	22–25	25–22	11–15	105–102
19 Ago	South Korea	0–3	Japan	20–25	22–25	20–25			62–75

== Final round ==
- Venue: Macau

=== Pool play ===
==== Group A ====
Pos	Team	Pld	W	L	Pts	SW	SL	SR	SPW	SPL	SPR	Qualification
1	Russia	3	3	0	6	9	3	3.000	278	222	1.252	Semifinals
2	China	3	2	1	5	7	5	1.400	274	256	1.070	Semifinals
3	Japan	3	1	2	4	7	7	1.000	282	306	0.922	
4	Germany	3	0	3	3	1	9	0.111	194	244	0.795	

Date		Score		Set 1	Set 2	Set 3	Set 4	Set 5	Total
22 Ago	Russia	3–2	Japan	25–22	25–14	19–25	21–25	15–7	105–93
22 Ago	China	3–0	Germany	25–20	26–24	25–18			76–62
23 Ago	Russia	3–0	Germany	25–15	25–16	25–13			75–44
23 Ago	China	3–2	Japan	25–10	26–24	22–25	25–27	15–10	113–96
24 Ago	Japan	3–1	Germany	25–21	25–19	18–25	25–23		93–88
24 Ago	Russia	3–1	China	25–20	25–22	23–25	25–18		98–85

==== Group B ====
Pos	Team	Pld	W	L	Pts	SW	SL	SR	SPW	SPL	SPR	Qualification
1	Cuba	3	3	0	6	9	2	4.500	266	223	1.193	Semifinals
2	United States	3	2	1	5	6	5	1.200	256	243	1.053	Semifinals
3	Brazil	3	1	2	4	6	6	1.000	276	283	0.975	
4	South Korea	3	0	3	3	1	9	0.111	198	247	0.802	

Date		Score		Set 1	Set 2	Set 3	Set 4	Set 5	Total
22 Ago	Brazil	2–3	Cuba	21–25	29–27	22–25	25–21	15–17	112–115
22 Ago	United States	3–1	South Korea	27–25	18–25	25–16	25–14		95–80
23 Ago	United States	0–3	Cuba	24–26	13–25	20–25			57–76
23 Ago	Brazil	3–0	South Korea	25–20	25–19	27–25			77–64
24 Ago	Cuba	3–0	South Korea	25–22	25–17	25–15			75–54
24 Ago	United States	3–1	Brazil	31–29	23–25	25–13	25–20		104–87

=== Final four ===
Semifinals
25 August
United States	3
Russia	2
25 August
China	3
Cuba	1

Final
26 August
United States	3
China	1
3rd place match
26 August
Russia	3
Cuba	0

==== Semifinals ====
Date		Score		Set 1	Set 2	Set 3	Set 4	Set 5	Total
25 Ago	United States	3–2	Russia	25–22	28–26	21–25	25–27	15–9	114–109
25 Ago	China	3–1	Cuba	18–25	25–21	25–22	25–23		93–91

==== 7th place match ====
Date		Score		Set 1	Set 2	Set 3	Set 4	Set 5	Total
25 Ago	South Korea	3–1	Germany	23–25	25–21	25–20	25–18		98–84

==== 5th place match ====
Date		Score		Set 1	Set 2	Set 3	Set 4	Set 5	Total
25 Ago	Brazil	3–2	Japan	22–25	19–25	25–23	25–11	15–8	106–92

==== 3rd place match ====
Date		Score		Set 1	Set 2	Set 3	Set 4	Set 5	Total
26 Ago	Russia	3–0	Cuba	25–18	25–11	25–20			75–49

==== Final ====
Date		Score		Set 1	Set 2	Set 3	Set 4	Set 5	Total
26 Ago	United States	3–1	China	26–28	25–20	25–21	25–11		101–80

== Final ranking ==
Place	Team
1st place, gold medalist(s)	United States
2nd place, silver medalist(s)	China
3rd place, bronze medalist(s)	Russia
4	Cuba
5	Brazil
6	Japan
7	South Korea
8	Germany

2001 FIVB World Grand Prix winners

United States
Second title

Team roster
Sarah Butler, Danielle Scott, Stacy Sykora, Elisabeth Bachman, Heather Bown, Charlene Tagaloa, Therese Crawford, Nicole Branagh, Robyn Ah Mow, Tara Cross-Battle, Logan Tom and Sarah Noriega.
Head coach
Toshiaki Yoshida

== Individual awards ==
- Most valuable player:
  - Danielle Scott (USA)
- Best scorer:
  - Danielle Scott (USA)
- Best spiker:
  - Elizaveta Tichtchenko (RUS)
- Best blocker:
  - Danielle Scott (USA)
- Best server:
  - Zoila Barros (CUB)
- Best digger:
  - Stacy Sykora (USA)
- Best setter:
  - Robyn Ah Mow (USA)
- Best receiver:
  - Elena Tiourina (RUS)
