= Volleyball at the 1994 Goodwill Games =

1994 Goodwill Games
Tournament details
- Host country: Saint Petersburg, Russia
- Dates: July 13 to 18, 1994
- Teams: 8 (only women)
- Venue: (in 1 host city)

Final positions
- Champions: Russia (1st title)

The volleyball tournament for the 1994 Goodwill Games was held from July 21 to 27, 1994 in Saint Petersburg, Russia.

== Participating teams ==
Women - Pool A

China
Cuba
Japan
Peru

Women - Pool B

Germany
Netherlands
Russia
United States

== Medalists ==
Event	Gold	Silver	Bronze
Women	Russia	United States	Japan
