= 2001 FIVB World Grand Prix squads =

This article show all participating team squads at the 2001 FIVB Women's Volleyball World Grand Prix, played by eight countries with the final round held in Macau, China.

== Brazil ==
- Head coach: Marco Aurélio Motta

| # | Name | Club | Date of birth | Height | Weight | Spike | Block |
|---|---|---|---|---|---|---|---|
| 2 | Elisângela Oliveira | | October 30, 1978 (age 46) | 184 | 84 |
| 3 | Erika Coimbra | | March 23, 1980 (age 45) | 180 | 64 | 301 | 280 |
| 4 | Fabiana Berto | | January 23, 1976 (age 49) | 180 | 61 |
| 5 | Fernanda Doval | | July 16, 1975 (age 49) | 190 | 62 |
| 7 | Hélia Souza | | March 10, 1970 (age 55) | 173 | 63 |
| 9 | Janina Conceição | | October 25, 1972 (age 52) | 192 | 82 | 312 | 288 |
| 11 | Karin Rodrigues | | November 8, 1971 (age 53) | 187 | 75 | 309 | 285 |
| 14 | Kely Fraga | | October 3, 1974 (age 50) | 193 | 79 |
| 15 | Patrícia Cocco | | September 14, 1971 (age 53) | 176 | 61 |
| 16 | Raquel Silva | | April 30, 1978 (age 46) | 191 | 72 | 300 | 282 |
| 17 | Ricarda Lima | | September 12, 1970 (age 54) | 184 | 66 |
| 18 | Walewska Oliveira | | October 1, 1979 (age 45) | 190 | 81 |
| 19 | Flávia Carvalho | | June 19, 1976 (age 48) | 184 | 72 |

#9 Janina Conceição injured herself in the second weekend and was substituted by #19 Flávia Carvalho

== Cuba ==
- Head coach: Luis Felipe Calderon

| # | Name | Club | Date of birth | Height | Weight | Spike | Block |
|---|---|---|---|---|---|---|---|
| 1 | Yumilka Ruiz | | 08.05.1978 | 179 | 62 | 329 | 315 |
| 4 | Maisbelis Martínez | | 13.06.1977 | 182 | 79 | 322 | 306 |
| 5 | Misleidis Martínez | | 09.03.1983 | 176 | 69 |
| 7 | Yoslam Muñoz | | 19.02.1980 | 183 | 72 |
| 8 | Yaima Ortiz | | 09.11.1981 | 179 | 70 | 325 | 313 |
| 9 | Indira Mestre | | 21.04.1979 | 183 | 73 |
| 10 | Regla Torres | | 12.02.1975 | 191 | 75 | 342 | 332 |
| 11 | Liana Mesa | | 26.12.1977 | 179 | 70 | 318 | 307 |
| 13 | Anniara Muñoz | | 24.01.1980 | 180 | 69 | 320 | 312 |
| 14 | Ana Fernández | | 03.08.1973 | 185 | 78 | 325 | 316 |
| 17 | Marta Sánchez | | 17.05.1973 | 182 | 75 | 324 | 310 |
| 18 | Zoila Barros | | 06.08.1976 | 188 | 76 | 325 | 312 |

== China ==
- Head coach: Chen Zhonghe

| # | Name | Club | Date of birth | Height | Weight | Spike | Block |
|---|---|---|---|---|---|---|---|
| 1 | Zhang Jing | | 14.10.1979 | 190 | 75 |
| 2 | Feng Kun | | 28.12.1978 | 183 | 75 | 319 | 310 |
| 3 | Yang Hao | | 21.03.1980 | 183 | 75 | 319 | 314 |
| 4 | Liu Yanan | | 29.09.1980 | 186 | 73 | 320 | 313 |
| 5 | Wu Yongmei | | 01.01.1975 | 186 | 75 |
| 6 | Li Shan | | 21.05.1980 | 185 | 72 | 317 | 300 |
| 7 | Zhou Suhong | | 23.04.1979 | 182 | 75 | 313 | 305 |
| 8 | Zhao Ruirui | | 08.10.1981 | 196 | 75 | 326 | 315 |
| 9 | Zhang Yuehong | | 09.11.1975 | 182 | 73 | 324 | 322 |
| 12 | Song Nina | | 07.04.1980 | 179 | 65 | 303 | 293 |
| 15 | Zhang Na | | 19.04.1980 | 180 | 72 | 302 | 292 |
| 18 | Lin Hanying | | 20.07.1978 | 184 | 71 |

== Germany ==
- Head coach: Lee Hee-Wan

| # | Name | Club | Date of birth | Height | Weight | Spike | Block |
|---|---|---|---|---|---|---|---|
| 1 | Beatrice Dömeland | | 04.08.1973 | 178 | 63 | 300 | 287 |
| 3 | Kathy Radzuweit | | 02.03.1982 | 196 | 71 | 319 | 300 |
| 5 | Sylvia Roll | | 29.05.1973 | 180 | 72 | 308 | 286 |
| 7 | Ulrike Jurk | | 04.03.1979 | 175 | 68 |
| 9 | Christina Benecke | | 14.10.1974 | 190 | 80 | 314 | 291 |
| 10 | Anja-Nadin Pietrek | | 13.03.1979 | 185 | 70 |
| 11 | Jana Müller | | 24.05.1978 | 184 | 68 |
| 13 | Anja Krause | | 31.01.1977 | 183 | 70 |
| 15 | Angelina Grün | | 02.12.1979 | 185 | 67 | 309 | 287 |
| 16 | Judith Sylvester | | 13.10.1977 | 193 | 85 | 312 | 296 |
| 17 | Birgit Thumm | | 03.07.1980 | 184 | 70 | 310 | 289 |
| 18 | Andrea Berg | | 24.01.1981 | 188 | 71 | 306 | 299 |

== Japan ==
- Head coach: Masahiro Yoshikawa

| # | Name | Club | Date of birth | Height | Weight | Spike | Block |
|---|---|---|---|---|---|---|---|
| 1 | Minako Onuki | | 15.10.1972 | 173 | 66 |
| 2 | Chikako Kumamae | | 11.04.1974 | 180 | 65 |
| 3 | Yuka Sakurai | | 02.09.1974 | 167 | 56 |
| 4 | Junko Moriyama | | 26.02.1975 | 180 | 70 |
| 6 | Shinako Tanaka | | 28.07.1975 | 172 | 62 |
| 10 | Megumi Kawamura | | 12.07.1983 | 193 | 67 |
| 11 | Yoshie Takeshita | | 18.03.1978 | 159 | 55 |
| 14 | Miyuki Takahashi | | 25.12.1978 | 170 | 67 |
| 15 | Makiko Horai | | 06.01.1979 | 187 | 62 |
| 16 | Sachiko Sugiyama | | 19.10.1979 | 183 | 63 |
| 17 | Ikumi Nishibori | | 20.08.1981 | 168 | 60 |
| 18 | Ai Otomo | | 24.03.1982 | 183 | 70 |

== Russia ==
- Head coach: Nikolay Karpol

| # | Name | Club | Date of birth | Height | Weight | Spike | Block |
|---|---|---|---|---|---|---|---|
| 1 | Olga Potachova | | 26.06.1976 | 204 | 100 |
| 2 | Natalya Morozova | | 28.01.1973 | 188 | 74 |
| 4 | Elena Tiourina | | 12.04.1971 | 184 | 80 |
| 5 | Lioubov Chachkova | | 04.12.1977 | 192 | 73 |
| 6 | Elena Godina | | 17.09.1977 | 196 | 73 |
| 8 | Evguenia Artamonova | | 17.07.1975 | 191 | 74 |
| 9 | Elizaveta Tichtchenko | | 07.02.1975 | 190 | 75 |
| 10 | Elena Vassilevskaya | | 27.02.1978 | 176 | 68 |
| 11 | Ekaterina Gamova | | 17.10.1980 | 205 | 75 |
| 12 | Tatyana Gracheva | | 23.02.1973 | 180 | 74 |
| 13 | Inessa Sargsyan | | 17.01.1972 | 190 | 75 |
| 14 | Elena Plotnikova | | 26.07.1978 | 186 | 71 |

== South Korea ==
- Head coach: Ryu Hao-Suk

| # | Name | Club | Date of birth | Height | Weight | Spike | Block |
|---|---|---|---|---|---|---|---|
| 3 | Kang Hye-Mi | | 27.04.1974 | 173 | 62 | 300 | 285 |
| 4 | Ku Min-Jung | | 25.08.1973 | 181 | 73 | 315 | 300 |
| 5 | Kim Sa-Nee | | 21.06.1981 | 180 | 72 | 302 | 292 |
| 7 | Kim Sung-Hee | | 23.03.1976 | 178 | 73 |
| 10 | Lee Yun-Hui | | 08.10.1980 | 181 | 74 |
| 11 | Lee Meong-Hee | | 07.04.1978 | 175 | 64 |
| 12 | Kim Hee-Kyung | | 12.05.1978 | 167 | 58 |
| 14 | Yang Sook-Kyung | | 03.05.1977 | 179 | 77 |
| 15 | Chang So-Yun | | 11.11.1974 | 184 | 73 |
| 16 | Jung Dae-Young | | 12.08.1981 | 183 | 75 |
| 17 | Han Yoo-Mi | | 05.02.1982 | 179 | 62 |
| 18 | Kim Hyang-Suk | | 04.06.1981 | 191 | 83 |

== United States ==
- Head coach: Toshiaki Yoshida

| # | Name | Club | Date of birth | Height | Weight | Spike | Block |
|---|---|---|---|---|---|---|---|
| 1 | Sarah Butler | | 24.08.1978 | 188 | 68 |
| 2 | Danielle Scott | | 01.10.1972 | 188 | 84 |
| 5 | Stacy Sykora | | 24.06.1977 | 176 | 61 |
| 6 | Elisabeth Bachman | | 07.11.1978 | 193 | 88 | 319 | 299 |
| 7 | Heather Bown | | 29.11.1978 | 188 | 90 |
| 8 | Charlene Tagaloa | | 30.08.1973 | 178 | 71 |
| 9 | Therese Crawford | | 26.08.1976 | 178 | 64 |
| 10 | Nicole Branagh | | 31.01.1979 | 187 | 79 |
| 11 | Robyn Ah Mow | | 15.09.1975 | 172 | 68 | 291 | 281 |
| 13 | Tara Cross-Battle | | 16.09.1968 | 180 | 71 |
| 15 | Logan Tom | | 25.05.1981 | 186 | 80 |
| 16 | Sarah Noriega | | 24.04.1976 | 187 | 70 |
