= Big West Conference women's volleyball =

Big West Conference
- Conference: NCAA
- Division: Division I
- No. of teams: 11

Big West Conference women's volleyball is an American collegiate volleyball conference. It includes 10–12 women's teams from various colleges and universities. Before the 2017–18 school year, the Big West sponsored volleyball only for women, but the conference added a men's volleyball league in that school year. (NCAA women's volleyball is a fall sport, while NCAA men's volleyball is a spring sport.) In 2012, Beach Volleyball began as a recognized collegiate sport. By 2016 this conference officially began play as one of the firsts in the nation.

== History ==
Through 2010, Big West volleyball teams had earned a combined 22 NCAA final four appearances among four teams. In 1981, pre-shuffling SDSU, two BWC stalwarts were able to make the contemporaneous representation.

The San Diego State University Aztecs became the first Big West program to reach the final four. University of the Pacific also reached the post-1981 final four. University of Hawaiʻi (UHM) was the Big West's first national champion in 1982. In 1998 California State University, Long Beach (CSULB) dominated the NCAA in a 36–0 season (the first to do so). At the turn of the 21st century, only UH and CSULB have been able to reach the final four—a total of five thus-far seasons.

In 2012, former WAC member University of Hawaiʻi joined Big West play for the first time since 1995. They won the regular season in 1995 and in 2012. BWC Schools' histories by annals would show competitive edges in B1G and PAC12 head-to-head duels.

Cal Poly San Luis Obispo became a perennial Beach Top 10 performer, with HC Todd Rogers.

As of 2018 the BWC is the only NCAA conference to sponsor an official pairs bracket following the awarding of a Team Championship. The 2018 winners as posted in the finals bracket were: T. Van Winden/Miric (CPSU) defeated Barber/Karelov (LBSU), 2–1. In 2019, the winning and dominant pair of Crissy Jones/Miric (CPSLO) were recognized as The BWC pair. Emily Sonny and Macy Gordon, in 2021.

Spike & Serve–Waikiki hosts, annually on the shores of Queens Beach, the autumn international draw of Pac Rim Championships.

== Teams ==
Institution	Current Head Coach	Big West Championships†	Final Four Appearances	Best NCAA finish
University of Hawaiʻi	Robyn Ah Mow-Santos	11 (1987, 1988, 1989, 1990, 1995, 2012, 2013, 2015, 2016, 2019, 2021)	9 (1982, 1983, 1987, 1988, 1996, 2000, 2002, 2003, 2009)	Champions (1982, 1983, 1987)
California State University, Long Beach	Tyler Hildebrand	13 (1991, 1992, 1993, 1994, 1996, 1997, 1998, 2001, 2005, 2008, 2009, 2011, 2014)	6 (1989, 1991, 1992, 1993, 1998, 2001)	Champions (1989, 1993, 1998)
University of the Pacific	Greg Gibbons	4 (1985, 1986, 1999, 2000)	5 (1981*, 1985*, 1986*, 1990*, 1999*)	Champions (1985*, 1986*)
University of California, Santa Barbara	Matt Jones	6 (1993, 2002, 2003, 2004, 2005, 2013)	None	Elite 8 (1997, 1999, 2000)
California Polytechnic State University 1x AVCA#1, 10-22-85	Caroline Walters	5 (1984, 2006, 2007, 2017, 2018)	None	Elite 8 (1981, 1982, 1983, 1985)
San Diego State University	Deitre Collins	None	2 (1981*, 1982*)	Final Four ('83 Elite 8*)
University of California, Irvine	Ashlie Hain	None	None	Second Round
California State University, Northridge (w Jennifer Fopma)	Jeff Stork	1 (2013)	None	Second Round
California State University, Fullerton	Ashley Preston	1 (2010)	None	First Round
California State University, Bakersfield	Cesar Benatti	None (w 2020 ~competition)	Div.II Champions (1989)	2 WAC automatic berths, 1st Rd. exit (2014, 2017)
University of California, San Diego	Ricci Luyties	None (w 2020 ~competition)	Div.II (2001)	Champions Div.III (1981, 1984, 1986–88, 1990, 1997)

† Since 1984, when the Big West was known as the P.C.A.A.
* As a member of the pre-2013 Big West

== NCAA Appearance ==
Each year since 1981 the Conference Champion of Big West Conference got an Automatic Bid to the NCAA Division I women's volleyball tournament. Teams could also qualify for the tournament via an At-large Bid. Starting from 2023 the winner of Big West Conference women's volleyball tournament will receive the automatic bid to the NCAA Tournament.

Year	Regular Season Champion	Conference Champion	At Large Bid
2000	University of Pacific	University of Pacific	UC Santa Barbara & Long Beach State & Utah State & Cal Poly
2001	Long Beach State	Long Beach State	University of Pacific & UC Santa Barbara & Utah State
2002	UC Santa Barbara	UC Santa Barbara	Long Beach State & Cal Poly & University of Pacific
2003	UC Santa Barbara	UC Santa Barbara	UC Irvine & Long Beach State & Idaho & CSUN & University of Pacific
2004	UC Santa Barbara	UC Santa Barbara	Long Beach State & University of Pacific & UC Irvine & Idaho
2005	Long Beach State	Long Beach State	UC Santa Barbara
2006	Cal Poly	Cal Poly	Long Beach State & UC Santa Barbara
2007	Cal Poly	Cal Poly	Long Beach State
2008	Long Beach State	Long Beach State	–
2009	Long Beach State	Long Beach State	UC Santa Barbara
2010	Cal State Fullerton	Cal State Fullerton	Long Beach State
2011	Long Beach State	Long Beach State	–
2012	Hawaii	Hawaii	–
2013	Hawaii	Hawaii	CSUN & UC Santa Barbara
2014	Long Beach State	Long Beach State	Hawaii
2015	Hawaii	Hawaii	–
2016	Hawaii	Hawaii	–
2017	Cal Poly	Cal Poly	Hawaii
2018	Cal Poly	Cal Poly	Hawaii
2019	Hawaii	Hawaii	Cal Poly & UC Santa Barbara
2020	season cancelled due to COVID-19	–	–
2021	Hawaii	Hawaii	–
2022	Hawaii	Hawaii	–
2023	UC Santa Barbara	Hawaii	UC Santa Barbara
2024	Cal Poly	Hawaii	–
2025	UC Davis	Cal Poly	–

== Big West Award History ==
=== Coach of the Year ===
Year	Coach of the Year (Media only)	School
2013	Jeff Stork	CSUN
2014	Brian Gimmillaro	Long Beach State
2015	Dave Shoji	Hawai'i
2016	Dave Shoji	Hawai'i
2017	Sam Crosson	Cal Poly San Luis Obispo
2018	Sam Crosson	Cal Poly San Luis Obispo
2019	Robyn Ah Mow & Ashley Preston	Hawai'i & CSUF
2020	Deitre Collins	San Diego State
2021	Robyn Ah Mow	Hawai'i
2022	Robyn Ah Mow	Hawai'i

=== Player of the Year ===
Year	Player of the Year	School
2013	Emily Hartong	Hawai'i
2014	Janelle Hudson	Long Beach State
2015	Nikki Taylor	Hawai'i
2016	Nikki Taylor	Hawai'i
2017	Taylor Nelson	Cal Poly San Luis Obispo
2018	Torrey Van Winden	Cal Poly San Luis Obispo
2019	Norene Iosia	Hawai'i
2020	Maia Dvoracek	Cal Poly San Luis Obispo
2021	Brooke Van Sickle	Hawai'i
2022	Amber Igiede	Hawai'i

=== Freshman of the Year ===
Year	Freshman of the Year	School
2013	Alison Spindt	UC Santa Barbara
2014	Ashley Murray	Long Beach State
2015	Aldee Van Winden	Cal Poly San Luis Obispo
2016	Lindsey Ruddins	UC Santa Barbara
2017	Mahalia White	UC Davis
2018	Avalon DeNecochea	Cal Poly San Luis Obispo
2019	Hanna Hellvig	Hawai'i
2020	Mia Tuaniga	Long Beach State
2021	Michelle Ohwobete	UC Santa Barbara
2022	Caylen Alexander	Hawai'i

=== Setter of the Year ===
Year	Setter of the Year	School
2013	Sydney Gedryn	CSUN
2014	Janelle Hudson	Long Beach State
2015	Tayler Higgins	Hawai'i
2016	Taylor Nelson	Cal Poly San Luis Obispo
2017	Taylor Nelson	Cal Poly San Luis Obispo
2018	Norene Iosia	Hawai'i
2019	Avalon DeNecochea	Cal Poly San Luis Obispo
2020	Olivia Lovenberg	UC Santa Barbara
2021	Kate Lang & Seleisa Elisaia	Hawai'i & CS Bakersfield
2022	Kate Lang	Hawai'i

=== Defensive Player of the Year ===
Year	Defensive Player of the Year	School
2013	Ali Longo	Hawai'i
2014	Tyler Jackson	Long Beach State
2015	Savanah Kahakai	Hawai'i
2016	Savanah Kahakai	Hawai'i
2017	Hailey Harward	Long Beach State
2018	Tita Akiu	Hawai'i
2019	Zoe Fleck	UC Santa Barbara
2020	Brooke Van Sickle	Hawai'i
2021	Macall Peed	UC Santa Barbara

=== Libero of the Year ===
Year	Libero of the Year	School
2022	Macall Peed	UC Santa Barbara

== Big West volleyball in the AVCA ==
The American Volleyball Coaches Association (AVCA) annually awards Coach of the Year and Player of the Year honors. The following lists coaches/players from the Big West who have received these top awards.

=== Coach of the Year ===
- 1982 - Dave Shoji, Hawai'i
- 1986 - John Dunning, University of the Pacific
- 1989 - Brian Gimmillaro, Long Beach State
- 1993 - Kathy Gregory (Int'l VB HOF'r 1986–1997 WPVA Exe. Dir.), UC Santa Barbara
- 1998 - Brian Gimmillaro, Long Beach State
- 2009 - Dave Shoji, Hawai'i

=== Player of the Year ===
- 1982, 1983 - Deitre Collins, Hawai'i
- 1986 - Elaina Oden, University of the Pacific
- 1987 - Tonya Williams, Hawai'i
- 1988 - Tara Cross, Long Beach State
- 1989 - Tonya Williams & Tara Cross, Hawai'i & Long Beach State
- 1991 - Antoniette White, Long Beach State
- 1993 - Danielle Scott, Long Beach State
- 1996 - Angelica Ljungqvist, Hawai'i
- 1997, 1998 - Misty May, Long Beach State
- 2003 - Kim Willoughby, Hawai'i

== Big West Beach Volleyball (AVCA/NCAA) ==
=== 2012–2016 as an Emerging Sport ===
CSULB reached the post-season as National Runners-up in 2012; as National Champions in 2013; as National Runners-up in 2015. UHM reached the post-season in 2014 and 2015.
All-American choices were: Caitlyn Ledoux/Tara Roennicke (2012, 2013); Jane Croson (2012), Karissa Cook (2014), Katie Spieler (2014), Brittany Tiegs (2014, 2015), Nikki Taylor (2014, 2015)

=== NCAA Collegiate Beach Volleyball Championships ===
- UHM won all the way to the Gulf Shores, AL NCAA Championships with All-Americans Emily Maglio/Katie Spieler (2016); Morgan Martin/Mikayla Tucker (2017); Emily Maglio/Ka'iwi Schucht (2018) and HM AVCA all-American Amy Ozee (2019). Hawai'i does it seven-in-a-row for 2020.
- Long Beach State won with All-Americans Rachel Nieto/Nele Barber (2017); with non-Championships (CSULB 2018), HM AVCA all-American Nele Barber. Hailey Harward (AVP, 2017–19) has consecutively made the-money-rounds on tour. Cali Bunn has retired from BVB.
- All-American Torrey Van Winden, a 2016 World Championships semifinalist, she represented the CPSLO Mustangs in 2018 (w freshman, Canadian, AA, Tiadora Miric). Sister Adlee (Van Winden), along with Taylor Nelson, earned All-American status during 2017–18. Crissy Jones (1st Team AVCA AA) was in as representation for 2019. Poly returned for a second consecutive NCAAT appearance in 2020.
