= Long Beach State Beach women's volleyball =

American college volleyball team

- University: California State University, Long Beach
- Head coach: Natalie Reagan (3rd season)
- Conference: Big West
- Location: Long Beach, California, US
- Home arena: Walter Pyramid (capacity: 5,000)
- Nickname: Beach
- Colors: Black and gold

AIAW/NCAA tournament champion
- 1972, 1973, 1989, 1993, 1998

AIAW/NCAA tournament runner-up
- 1970, 1971, 1991, 2001

AIAW/NCAA tournament semifinal
- 1989, 1991, 1992, 1993, 1997, 1998, 1999, 2001

AIAW/NCAA tournament appearance
- 1985, 1987, 1988, 1989, 1990, 1991, 1993, 1994, 1995, 1996, 1997, 1998, 1999, 2000, 2001, 2002, 2003, 2004, 2005, 2006, 2007, 2008, 2009, 2010, 2011, 2014

Conference regular season champion
- 1991, 1992, 1993, 1994, 1996, 1997, 1998, 2001, 2005, 2008, 2009, 2011, 2014

The Long Beach State Beach women's volleyball team is an NCAA Division I women's volleyball team for California State University, Long Beach. They are a member of the Big West Conference and are led by head coach Natalie Reagan.

The team has won five national championships: two AIAW titles and three NCAA Division I titles. The Beach have played in the Big West Conference since the conference began sponsoring women's sports. Long Beach has the Big West regular season six times, most recently in 2014. Long Beach has not won the conference's tournament since it began in 2023.

Long Beach was the very first women's volleyball program to have a perfect season. They did so in 1998, finishing with a record of 36–0, and winning the national championship over Penn State.

The program has boasted a number of notable players; Olympian and 1988 & 1989 National Player of the Year Tara Cross; 1991 National Player of the Year Antoinette White; 1993 National Player of the Year Danielle Scott; and Olympian and 1997 & 1998 National Player of the Year and Misty May.

== Program record and history ==
Year	Head Coach	Overall record	Conference record	Conference standing	Postseason
(Independent) (1964–1975)
1964	Dr. Frances Schaafsma	4–4	—	—	
1965	Dr. Frances Schaafsma	9–3	—	—	
1966	Dr. Frances Schaafsma	10–2	—	—	
1967	Dr. Frances Schaafsma	11–1	—	—	
1968	Dr. Frances Schaafsma	15–2	—	—	
1969	Dr. Frances Schaafsma	19–9	—	—	AIAW Nationals: 4th
1970	Dr. Frances Schaafsma	24–6	—	—	AIAW Runner-up
1971	Ann Heck	28–5	—	—	AIAW Runner-up
1972	Dixie Grimmett	33–0	—	—	AIAW Champions
1973	Dixie Grimmett	33–2	—	—	AIAW Champions
1974	Dixie Grimmett	26–7–1	—	—	AIAW Nationals: 5th
1975	Dixie Grimmett	27–6	—	—	AIAW Nationals: 4th
(WCAA) (1976–1984)
1976	Dixie Grimmett	12-8–2	4–4	5th	AIAW Regionals
1977	Dixie Grimmett	17–17–1	3–5	7th	AIAW Nationals: 5th
1978	Dixie Grimmett	23–14–2	2–6	7th	AIAW Regionals
1979	Dixie Grimmett	19–10	8–4	4th	AIAW Regionals
1980	Dixie Grimmett	10–20	2–12	8th	
1981	Dixie Grimmett	12–21	1–11	7th	
1982	Dixie Grimmett	8–28	0–14	8th	
1983	Dixie Grimmett	12–21	2–12	7th	
1984	Dixie Grimmett	18–15	3–11	7th	
(PCAA/Big West) (1985–present)
1985	Brian Gimmillaro	18–13	8–8	5th	NCAA First Round
1986	Brian Gimmillaro	15–17	6–12	7th	
1987	Brian Gimmillaro	25–14	7–11	7th	NCAA First Round
1988	Brian Gimmillaro	26–7	13–5	3rd	NCAA Regional Semifinal
1989	Brian Gimmillaro	32–5	13–5	3rd	NCAA National Champions
1990	Brian Gimmillaro	29–9	13–5	4th	NCAA Regional Final
1991	Brian Gimmillaro	36–2	17–1	1st	NCAA Runner-up
1992	Brian Gimmillaro	30–3	18–0	1st	NCAA National Semifinals
1993	Brian Gimmillaro	32–2	17–1	T–1st	NCAA National Champions
1994	Brian Gimmillaro	27–6	16–2	1st	NCAA Regional Final
1995	Brian Gimmillaro	22–10	12–6	4th	NCAA Second Round |-
1996	Brian Gimmillaro	33–3	15–1	1st	NCAA Regional Semifinals
1997	Brian Gimmillaro	33–2	16–0	1st	NCAA National Semifinals
1998	Brian Gimmillaro	36–0	16–0	1st	NCAA National Champions
1999	Brian Gimmillaro	31–4	14–2	2nd	NCAA National Semifinals
2000	Brian Gimmillaro	24–8	11–5	3rd	NCAA Regional Semifinals
2001	Brian Gimmillaro	33–1	18–0	1st	NCAA Runner-up
2002	Brian Gimmillaro	28–4	15–3	2nd	NCAA First Round
2003	Brian Gimmillaro	19–11	12–6	T–2nd	NCAA First Round
2004	Brian Gimmillaro	24–7	13–5	T–2nd	NCAA Second Round
2005	Brian Gimmillaro	25–7	12–2	T–1st	NCAA First Round
2006	Brian Gimmillaro	26–6	12–2	2nd	NCAA Second Round
2007	Brian Gimmillaro	26–7	14–2	2nd	NCAA Second Round
2008	Brian Gimmillaro	26–6	13–3	1st	NCAA Second Round
2009	Brian Gimmillaro	22–9	12–4	1st	NCAA First Round
2010	Brian Gimmillaro	25–8	12–4	T–2nd	NCAA First Round
2011	Brian Gimmillaro	23–7	14–2	1st	NCAA First Round
2012	Brian Gimmillaro	18–11	13–5	2nd	
2013	Brian Gimmillaro	18–11	13–3	T–1st	
2014	Brian Gimmillaro	27–5	16–0	1st	NCAA Second Round
2015	Brian Gimmillaro	25–6	13–3	2nd	
2016	Brian Gimmillaro	21–10	13–3	2nd	
2017	Joy McKienzie-Fuerbringer	10–19	7–9	T–5th	
2018	Joy McKienzie-Fuerbringer	16–13	8–8	T–5th	
2019	Joy McKienzie-Fuerbringer	12–17	9–7	T–4th	
2020	Joy McKienzie-Fuerbringer	COVID	COVID	—	—
2021	Joy McKienzie-Fuerbringer (9–11); Sabrina Hernandez (7–4)	16–15	10–10	T–5th	
2022	Tyler Hildebrand	19–9	14–6	T–3rd	
2023	Tyler Hildebrand	21–10	13–5	4th	Big West Finals
2024	Natalie Reagan	19–11	12–6	4th	Big West Semifinals
2025	Natalie Reagan	22–9	14–4	T–2nd	Big West Semifinals
Total:		1318–516–6 (.718)	539–245 (.688)		
National champion Postseason invitational champion Conference regular season champion Conference regular season and conference tournament champion Division regular season champion Division regular season and conference tournament champion Conference tournament champion

== Team facts ==
=== Head coach ===
- 1964–1970: Dr. Frances Schaafsma
- 1971: Ann Heck
- 1972–1984: Dixie Grimmett
- 1985–2016: Brian Gimmillaro
- 2017–2021: Joy McKienzie-Fuerbringer
- 2021: Sabrina Hernandez
- 2022–2023: Tyler Hildebrand
- 2024–present: Natalie Reagan

Brian Gimmillaro led Long Beach to all three of their NCAA recognized championships, and has received the National Coach of the Year award twice during his career: once in 1989, and the other in 1998. Upon his retirement, Long Beach has not found a coach with his sustained longevity, currently on their third coach since 2017. Their current coach, Reagan, played at Oregon State during her college career.

=== League ===
- 1966–80: Association for Intercollegiate Athletics for Women (AIAW)
- 1981–present: NCAA Division I

=== National championships ===
- 1972: AIAW by defeating BYU
- 1973: AIAW by defeating Texas Women's
- 1989: NCAA by defeating Nebraska, 15–12, 15–0, 15–6
- 1993: NCAA by defeating Penn State, 15–13, 12–15, 15–11, 16–14
- 1998: NCAA by defeating Penn State, 15–3, 15–10, 13–15, 14–16, 15–12

== See also ==
- List of NCAA Division I women's volleyball programs
