= Big West Conference women's volleyball tournament =

- Conference volleyball championship
- Sport: Volleyball
- Conference: Big West Conference
- Number of teams: 6
- Format: Single-elimination
- Current stadium: Campus Sites (Chosen in advance)
- Played: 2023–present
- Last contest: 2025
- Current champion: Cal Poly
- Most championships: Hawai'i (2)
- TV partner: ESPN+
- Official website: bigwest.org/wvball

Host stadiums
- Walter Pyramid; Bren Events Center

Host locations
- Long Beach, California; Irvine, California

The Big West women's volleyball tournament is the conference championship tournament in volleyball, organised by the Big West Conference. The tournament was first introduced in early 2023.

It is played under a single-elimination format and seeding is based on regular season records. The winner, declared conference champion, receives the conference's automatic bid to the NCAA Division I women's volleyball tournament.

Hawai'i is the most winning team of the competition with 2 titles.

== Champions ==
=== Finals ===
Key

- (1) — Title number
- **Bold** – Winning team won **regular season**

Year	Champion	Score	Runner-up	Venue / City	MVP	Ref.
2023	Hawai'i (1)	3–0	Long Beach State	Walter Pyramid • Long Beach, CA	Amber Igiede, Hawai'i	
2024	Hawai'i (2)	3–1	Cal Poly	Bren Events Center • Irvine, Ca	Tayli Ikenaga	
2025	Cal Poly (1)	3–1	UC Davis	Walter Pyramid • Long Beach, CA	Chloe Leluge, Cal Poly	

=== Team titles ===
School	#	Years won
**Hawai'i**	2	2023, 2024
**Cal Poly**	1	2025

== All-time record ==
School	W	L	Pct.	Finals	Titles	Title years
Cal Poly	4	1	.800	2	1	2025
Cal State Bakersfield	0	0	–	0	0	–
Cal State Fullerton	0	0	–	0	0	–
Cal State Northridge	0	1	.000	0	0	–
Hawaii	4	0	1.000	2	2	2023, 2024
Long Beach State	4	3	.571	1	0	–
UC Davis	2	3	.400	1	0	—
UC Irvine	0	3	.000	0	0	–
UC Riverside	0	0	–	0	0	—
UC San Diego	0	1	.000	0	0	—
UC Santa Barbara	1	2	.333	0	0	–
