= Pietrek =

Pietrek is a surname. Notable people with the surname include:

- Anja-Nadin Pietrek (born 1979), German volleyball player
