= Anna Kraus =

Anna Kraus may refer to:

- Anna Kraus (opera)
- Anna Kraus (soccer)

== See also ==
- Anna Krauss
- Anja Krause
