= Robyn Ah Mow =

American indoor volleyball player and coach

Personal information
- Full name: Robyn Mokihana Ah Mow
- Born: September 15, 1975 (age 51); Honolulu, Hawaii, U.S.
- Height: 5 ft 7 in (1.70 m)

Volleyball information
- Position: Setter
- Number: 11 (national team)

Career
Years	Teams
2007–08	Volero Zurich

National team
1998–2009	United States
Medal record
Women's volleyball
Representing the United States
Olympic Games
Silver medal – second place	2008 Beijing	Team
FIVB World Cup
Bronze medal – third place	2007 Japan	Team
FIVB World Grand Prix
Gold medal – first place	2001 Macau	Team
Bronze medal – third place	2004 Reggio Calabria	Team
Montreux Volley Masters
Silver medal – second place	Switzerland 2004
NORCECA Championship
Gold medal – first place	2001 Santo Domingo
Gold medal – first place	2003 Santo Domingo
Gold medal – first place	2005 Port of Spain
Silver medal – second place	1999 Monterrey
Silver medal – second place	2007 Winnipeg

Robyn Ah Mow
Playing career
- 1993–1996: Hawaii
- Position: Setter

Coaching career (HC unless noted)
- 1997–1998: Hawaii (student asst.)
- 2011–2015: Hawaii (asst.)
- 2017–2025: Hawaii

Head coaching record
- Overall: 165–72 (.696)
- Tournaments: 4-7 (NCAA)

Accomplishments and honors

Championships
- 3× Big West regular season (2019, 2021, 2022); 2× Big West tournament (2023, 2024)

Awards
- 2× Big West Coach of the Year (2019, 2021); AVCA Pacific North All-Region Coach of the Year (2019)

Robyn Mokihana Ah Mow (born September 15, 1975) is an American indoor volleyball former player and coach who was most recently the head coach of the Hawaii Rainbow Wahine volleyball team. She was a setter on the USA national team and played at the 2000 Sydney Olympics, the 2004 Athens Olympics, and at the 2008 Beijing Olympics, helping Team USA to a silver medal. She worked as an assistant coach at the University of Hawaii Rainbow Wahine volleyball team from 2011-2015 and was named Head Coach in 2017 after Dave Shoji's retirement. She has also served as a club coach at Na Keiki Mau Loa Volleyball Club.

== Personal life ==
Ah Mow was born in Honolulu, Hawaii, to Talmage and Lovina Ah Mow (both deceased) and has two brothers, Kekoa and Tyson, and two sisters, Dara and Arlene. She attended McKinley High School in Honolulu, Hawaii, where she was a first-team all-Oahu Interscholastic Association East selection for four years and a three-time All-State first team selection.

Ah Mow was married to Niobel Rafael Santos, former amateur athlete who is now a member of the U.S. Armed Forces and has served three tours in Iraq. They have two sons, Jordan (born in 2003) and Jreyden (born in 2016), and daughter, Jream (born in 2010). They divorced in 2019.

== College ==
Ah Mow attended college at the University of Hawai'i from 1993-1996 where she was a two-time AVCA First Team all-American. As a setter, she helped Hawai'i to the 1996 NCAA Championship match, losing to Stanford.

== Professional and Olympic career ==
She joined the USA national team in 1999, setting in seven games at the NORCECA championships and playing in 13 sets at the World Cup. In 2000, she played in four sets of the Nike Americas’ Volleyball Challenge, helping Team USA qualify for the 2000 Sydney Olympics. She set the team to victories over no. 4 China, no. 5 Korea and no. 7 Japan at the Grand Prix. At the 2000 Olympic Games, she started all seven matches and led the team to a .263 hitting percentage and a fourth-place finish.

In 2001, she earned Most Valuable Player honors at the World Championship Qualification Tournament and was also named the "Best Setter" at the NORCECA Zone Championships and played professionally for Castelo de Maia in Portugal.

At the 2004 Olympic Games in Athens, Greece, the team tied for fifth overall after losing to Brazil in the quarterfinals.

Robyn made her third Olympic appearance at the 2008 Summer Olympics, helping Team USA to a silver medal.

In her career, she has set for team USA at the World Grand Prix, the Pan American Cup, NORCECA, the Olympics, the FIVB World Championship and World Cup as well as numerous exhibition tours.

== Head coaching record ==
Record table
Season	Team	Overall	Conference	Standing	Postseason
Hawaii Rainbow Wahine (Big West Conference) (2017–present)
2017	Hawaii	20–8	14–2	2nd	NCAA first round
2018	Hawaii	18–9	14–2	2nd	NCAA first round
2019	Hawaii	26–4	14–2	1st	NCAA regional semifinals
2020–21	Hawaii	Cancelled due to the COVID-19 pandemic			
2021	Hawaii	22–8	18–2	1st	NCAA second round
2022	Hawaii	22–7	19–1	1st	NCAA first round
2023	Hawaii	24–9	14–4	T–2nd	NCAA second round
2024	Hawaii	21–10	13–5	T–2nd	NCAA first round
2025	Hawaii	12–17	8–10	T–6th	
Hawaii:		165–72 (.696)	114–28 (.803)		
Total:		165–72 (.696)			
National champion Postseason invitational champion Conference regular season champion Conference regular season and conference tournament champion Division regular season champion Division regular season and conference tournament champion Conference tournament champion

== Individual awards ==
- 2001 FIVB World Grand Prix "Best Setter"
- 2001 NORCECA Championship "Best Setter"
- 2003 NORCECA Championship "Best Setter"
- 2006 Pan-American Cup "Best Setter"

Awards
Preceded by (Brazil) Hélia de Souza	Best Setter of FIVB World Grand Prix; 2001	Succeeded by (Brazil) Marcelle Rodrigues
