= 2015 BYU Cougars women's volleyball team =

American college volleyball season

2015 BYU Cougars women's volleyball

WCC regular season Champs

NCAA, Regional semifinals
- Conference: West Coast Conference
- Record: 28–3 (16–2 WCC)
- Head coach: Heather Olmstead (1st season)
- Assistant coaches: David Hyte (2nd season); Charlene Johnson Whitted (1st season)
- Home arena: Smith Fieldhouse

The 2015 BYU Cougars women's volleyball team represented Brigham Young University in the 2015 NCAA Division I women's volleyball season. The Cougars were led by first year head coach Heather Olmstead and played their home games at the Smith Fieldhouse. The Cougars were members of the WCC.

BYU came off a season where they won the WCC regular season championship, participated in the NCAA tournament, and became the first unseeded team to make it to the National Championship match.

2015 West Coast Conference volleyball standings
	Conf.				Overall
Team	W		L	PCT	W		L	PCT
No. 11 BYU ‍†‍‍^{y}	16	–	2	.889	28	–	4	.875
San Diego ‍‍‍^{y}	14	–	4	.778	22	–	10	.688
Loyola Marymount ‍‍‍^{y}	13	–	5	.722	24	–	9	.727
Santa Clara ‍‍‍^{y}	13	–	5	.722	22	–	9	.710
Pacific ‍‍‍	8	–	10	.444	17	–	13	.567
Pepperdine ‍‍‍	8	–	10	.444	17	–	14	.548
Gonzaga ‍‍‍	7	–	11	.389	16	–	15	.516
Portland ‍‍‍	6	–	12	.333	16	–	15	.516
San Francisco ‍‍‍	4	–	14	.222	17	–	14	.548
Saint Mary's ‍‍‍	1	–	17	.056	6	–	22	.214
† – Conference champion y- Invited to the NCAA volleyball tournament As of 2016-06-17; Rankings from AVCA

== Season highlights ==
- BYU won the 2015 Marcia E. Hamilton Classic title.
- Alexa Gray won WCC Player of the Week honors for games 8/30-9/6, 11/2-11/8, 11/9-11/15, and 11/16–11/22.
- Amy Boswell won WCC Player of the Week honors for games 9/14-9/20.
- On November 17 Alexa Gray was named the National Player of the Week for games 11/9-11/15.
- On November 19 Alexa Gray set the single season rally era kill record for BYU in the victory over Santa Clara. The record moved her into fifth all-time at BYU.
- On November 21 BYU clinched an NCAA Tournament berth with a sweep of San Francisco. The win clinched a share of the conference title with San Diego, but with BYU having won both head-to-head matches, they were given the conferences auto tourney bid.

== Roster ==
2015 BYU Cougars Roster
Defensive Specialist/Libero: 1 Jaiden Achermann - Sophomore; 8 Makenna Santiago - Junior; 14 Ciara Parker - Senior; Middle blockers: 4 Madeline Graham - Sophomore; 7 Sophie Cram - Freshman; 10 Amy Boswell - Junior; 16 Whitney Young Howard - Junior	Outside hitters: 9 Alexa Gray - Senior; 11 Lacy Haddock - Freshman; 12 Veronica Jones - Freshman; 13 Danelle Parady - RS Freshman	Opposite hitters: 2 Cosy Burnett - Sophomore; 5 Emily Lewis - Freshman; Setters: 3 Alohi Robins-Hardy - Sophomore; 6 Lyndie Haddock - Freshman; 15 Kiani Tuileta - Freshman; 20 Camry Godfrey Willardson - Senior

== Schedule ==
All conference home games on BYUtv will be simulcast on BYU Radio with the exception of the Santa Clara game.

Date Time	Opponent	Rank	Arena City (Tournament)	Television	Result	Attendance	Record (WCC Record)
8/28; 6 p.m.	vs. Chicago State	#11	Galen Center; Los Angeles, CA (Women of Troy Baden Invitational)	P12 Digital	W 3–0 (25–13, 25–17, 25–22)	N/A	1–0
8/29; 1:30 p.m.	vs. #7 North Carolina	#11	Galen Center; Los Angeles, CA (Women of Troy Baden Invitational)	P12 Digital	W 3–1 (25–27, 25–19, 25–17, 26–24)	185	2–0
8/29; 9 p.m.	@ #22 USC	#11	Galen Center; Los Angeles, CA (Women of Troy Baden Invitational)	P12	L 3–0 (25–23, 25–22, 25–22)	1,079	2–1
9/04; 6 p.m.	@ St. Louis	#12	Chaifetz Arena; St. Louis, MO (Marcia E. Hamilton Classic)	Billiken TV	W 3–0 (25–17, 25–11, 25–14)	862	3–1
9/05; 11 a.m.	vs. #24 Purdue	#12	Chaifetz Arena; St. Louis, MO (Marcia E. Hamilton Classic)	Purdue Audio	W 3–0 (25–17, 25–21, 25–20)	357	4–1
9/05; 3:30 p.m.	vs. Arkansas–Pine Bluff	#12	Chaifetz Arena; St. Louis, MO (Marcia E. Hamilton Classic)		W 3–0 (25–6, 25–10, 25–9)	N/A	5–1
9/09; 7 p.m.	Idaho State	#9	Smith Fieldhouse; Provo, UT	BYUtv	W 3–2 (25–7, 20–25, 21–25, 25–14, 15–12)	1,551	6–1
9/11; 7 p.m.	Oregon State	#9	Smith Fieldhouse; Provo, UT	BYUtv	W 3–0 (25–16, 25–12, 25–15)	2,788	7–1
9/12; 6 p.m.	Oregon State	#9	Smith Fieldhouse; Provo, UT		W 3–1 (25–21, 25–23, 19–25, 25–16)	1,011	8–1
9/17; 7:30 p.m.	@ Utah	#9	Huntsman Center; Salt Lake City, UT (Deseret First Duel)	P12	W 3–0 (25–16, 25–18, 25–22)	3,056	9–1
9/19; 7 p.m.	@ Utah Valley	#9	PE Building; Orem, UT	UVU TV; WAC DN	W 3–0 (25–14, 25–15, 25–21)	2,445	10–1
9/24; 8 p.m.	@ San Francisco*	#10	War Memorial Gymnasium; San Francisco, CA	TheW.tv	W 3–1 (25–23, 17–25, 25–21, 25–22)	405	11–1 (1–0)
9/26; 2 p.m.	@ Santa Clara*	#10	Leavey Center; Santa Clara, CA	TheW.tv	L 3–1 (15–25, 25–19, 25–22, 25–20)	382	11–2 (1–1)
9/29; 7 p.m.	Loyola Marymount*	#15	Smith Fieldhouse; Provo, UT	ESPNU	W 3–1 (22–25, 25–19, 25–21, 25–19)	N/A	12–2 (2–1)
10/02; 8:30 p.m.	@ San Diego*	#15	Jenny Craig Pavilion; San Diego, CA	TheW.tv	W 3–0 (25–23, 26–24, 25–20)	858	13–2 (3–1)
10/08; 9 p.m.	@ Pacific*	#15	Alex G. Spanos Center; Stockton, CA	ESPNU	W 3–2 (20–25, 18–25, 25–16, 25–14, 15–8)	1,298	14–2 (4–1)
10/10; 2 p.m.	@ Saint Mary's*	#15	McKeon Pavilion; Moraga, CA	TheW.tv	W 3–0 (25–20, 25–17, 25–22)	383	15–2 (5–1)
10/15; 7 p.m.	Gonzaga*	#13	Smith Fieldhouse; Provo, UT	BYUtv	W 3–0 (25–21, 25–16, 25–16)	2,124	16–2 (6–1)
10/17; 1 p.m.	Portland*	#13	Smith Fieldhouse; Provo, UT	TheW.tv	W 3–0 (25–16, 25–17, 25–15)	2,032	17–2 (7–1)
10/22; 8 p.m.	@ Pepperdine*	#12	Firestone Fieldhouse; Malibu, CA	TheW.tv	W 3–0 (25–13, 25–19, 25–16)	240	18–2 (8–1)
10/24; 1 p.m.	@ Loyola Marymount*	#12	Gersten Pavilion; Los Angeles, CA	TheW.tv	L 3–2 (25–23, 19–25, 25–16, 23–25, 15–12)	467	18–3 (8–2)
10/30; 5 p.m.	#24 San Diego*	#16	Smith Fieldhouse; Provo, UT	BYUtv	W 3–0 (25–23, 25–19, 25–20)	2,082	19–3 (9–2)
11/05; 7 p.m.	Saint Mary's*	#14	Smith Fieldhouse; Provo, UT	BYUtv	W 3–0 (25–21, 25–17, 25–15)	1,886	20–3 (10–2)
11/07; 1 p.m.	Pacific*	#14	Smith Fieldhouse; Provo, UT	BYUtv	W 3–0 (25–18, 25–23, 25–17)	1,690	21–3 (11–2)
11/12; 8 p.m.	@ Portland*	#12	Chiles Center; Portland, OR	TheW.tv	W 3–1 (24–26, 25–20, 26–24, 25–18)	354	22–3 (12–2)
11/14; 1 p.m.	@ Gonzaga *	#12	McCarthey Athletic Center; Spokane, WA	TheW.tv	W 3–2 (23–25, 20–25, 25–23, 25–16, 16–14)	1,024	23–3 (13–2)
11/19; 7 p.m.	Santa Clara*	#12	Smith Fieldhouse; Provo, UT	BYUtv	W 3–1 (25–19, 25–22, 23–25, 25–14)	1,421	24–3 (14–2)
11/21; 12 p.m.	San Francisco*	#12	Smith Fieldhouse; Provo, UT		W 3–0 (27–25, 25–12, 25–17)	756	25–3 (15–2)
11/24; 7 p.m.	Pepperdine*	#11	Smith Fieldhouse; Provo, UT	BYUtv	W 3–1 (30–32, 25–9, 25–21, 25–23)	2,051	26–3 (16–2)
12/04; 7 p.m.	y- Ohio	#11	Smith Fieldhouse; Provo, UT	BYUtv	W 3–1 (19–25, 25–23, 25–17, 26–24)	2,761	27–3
12/05; 7 p.m.	y- Western Kentucky	#11	Smith Fieldhouse; Provo, UT	BYUtv	W 3–0 (25–23, 25–17, 25–20)	2,350	28–3
12/11; 3 p.m.	y- vs. #5 Nebraska	#11	Memorial Coliseum; Lexington, KY	ESPN3	L 3–0 (26–24, 25–17, 25–23)	N/A	28–4

*-Indicates Conference Opponent
y-Indicates NCAA Playoffs
Times listed are Mountain Time Zone.

== Announcers for televised games ==
- vs. Chicago State: Paul Duchesne, Chelsea Reber, & Dustin Avol
- vs. North Carolina: Paul Duchesne, Chelsea Reber, & Dustin Avol
- @ USC: Kevin Barnett & Tammy Blackburn
- @ Saint Louis: No commentary (video only)
- vs. Purdue: Kim Cook & Wendy Mayer (Internet radio, no video stream)
- Idaho State: Spencer Linton & Kristen Kozlowski
- Oregon State: Jarom Jordan & Kristen Kozlowski
- @ Utah: Thad Anderson & Amy Gant
- @ Utah Valley: Matthew Baiamonte & Steve Vail
- @ San Francisco: Pat Olson
- @ Santa Clara: No commentary (video only)
- Loyola Marymount: Melissa Lee & Holly McPeak
- @ San Diego: No commentary (video only)
- @ Pacific: Paul Sunderland & Kevin Barnett
- @ Saint Mary's: Alex Jensen & Scott Chisholm
- Gonzaga: Spencer Linton, Amy Gant, & Jason Shepherd
- Portland: Robbie Bullough & Tambre Haddock Nobles
- @ Pepperdine: Al Epstein
- @ Loyola Marymount: Peter Monoceros & Hunter Patterson
- San Diego: Spencer Linton, Kristen Kozlowski, & Jason Shepherd
- Saint Mary's: Jarom Jordan, Amy Gant, & Jason Shepherd
- Pacific: Jarom Jordan, Amy Gant, & Jason Shepherd
- @ Portland: Jason Brough
- @ Gonzaga: No commentary (video only)
- Santa Clara: Spencer Linton, Kristen Kozlowski, & Jason Shepherd
- Pepperdine: Spencer Linton, Kristen Kozlowski, & Jason Shepherd
- Ohio: Spencer Linton, Kristen Kozlowski, & Jason Shepherd
- Western Kentucky: Spencer Linton, Kristen Kozlowski, & Jason Shepherd
- vs. Nebraska: Tiffany Greene & Missy Whittemore

== See also ==
For information on BYU's other fall and winter sports please check out the following:
