= Brian Gimmillaro =

American volleyball coach

Brian Gimmillaro (born in 1948) is an American former women's volleyball coach for California State University, Long Beach from 1985 to 2017. Before joining Long Beach State, Gimmillaro began his coaching tenure with the girls volleyball team at Gahr High School from 1978 to 1985. With Gahr, Gimmillaro's team won two CIF Southern Section divisions and one California Interscholastic Federation championship. Upon leaving for Long Beach State, he had 142 wins and 15 losses in high school volleyball.

At Long Beach State, Gimmillaro and Long Beach State won the regular season of the Big West Conference thirteen times and the NCAA Division I women's volleyball tournament three times. He received over ten Coach of the Year awards, including from the American Volleyball Coaches Association and USA Volleyball. As Long Beach State's coach, Gimmillaro accumulated 835 wins and 221 losses. With his 835 wins, Gimmillaro is in the top 25 for most overall women's volleyball wins by an NCAA Division I coach. He was given the Donald S. Shondell All-Time Great Coach award from USA Volleyball in 2003 and named into the AVCA Hall of Fame in 2008.

== Early life and education ==
Gimmillaro was born in New York during the late 1940s. He lived with his two siblings and mother in New York before he moved to Los Angeles at the age of seventeen. For his post-secondary education, Gimmillaro attended an economics program at the California State University, Long Beach.

== Career ==
During the mid-1960s, Gimmillaro worked at Lucky Stores. Following his education, Gimmillaro sold products for General Mills during the early 1970s before he was a substitute until the mid-1970s. During his teaching career between 1972 and 1977, Gimmillaro worked at La Mirada High School and Gahr High School. Some of the subjects Gimmillaro was a teacher in were politics and math.

While at Gahr, Gimmillaro began his coaching experience in 1978. As part of the CIF Southern Section, Gimmillaro's girls volleyball team won the 3-A division in 1979 and the 5-A division in 1984. At California Interscholastic Federation events, his team won the California Division I championship in 1983. Upon leaving Gahr, Gimmillaro had 142 wins and 15 losses in high school volleyball by 1985.

In August 1985, Gimmillaro joined the women's volleyball team at Long Beach State as their associate head coach. He worked for Long Beach State in an interim position before becoming their head coach in December 1985. As part of the Big West Conference, Gimmillaro and Long Beach State were first in the regular season thirteen times between 1991 and 2014.

After winning their first NCAA Division I women's volleyball tournament in 1989, Gimmillaro's team re-won the championship in 1993 and 1998. At the NCAA Division I event, Gimmillaro and Long Beach were the runner-ups in 1991. They were also second during the 2001 edition. While at Long Beach State, Gimmillaro won his 700th game in 2010 and his 800th in 2015. Gimmillaro ended his coaching tenure with Long Beach State in 2017. With his 835 wins and 221 losses, Gimmillaro was in the top 25 for most overall women's volleyball wins by an NCAA Division I coach during 2022.

Apart from his head coaching tenure, Gimmillaro joined the California Juniors Volleyball Club as their owner in 1982. Gimmillaro was employed with the United States women's national volleyball team in business management before they competed in the 1984 Summer Olympics. While at Long Beach State, Gimmillaro decided to not work at the 1996 Summer Olympics and the University of Texas in 1997. With California Juniors, Gimmillaro was an assistant coach and director during the late 2000s.

== Honors and personal life ==
While with Long Beach State, Gimmillaro was a nine time women's volleyball Coach of the Year for the Big West Conference between 1991 and 2014. In 1998, Gimmillaro was named Coach of the Year for Division I schools by the American Volleyball Coaches Association. Gimmillaro was named National Coach of the Year for USA Volleyball in 1999. In 2003, USA Volleyball gave Gimmillaro the Donald S. Shondell All-Time Great Coach award.

Gimmillaro joined the AVCA Hall of Fame in 2008. In 2016, he was given a Distinguished Alumni award from Long Beach State. He was inducted into the Southern California Indoor Volleyball Hall of Fame in 2018. In 2022, the Brian Gimmillaro Locker Room was created by Long Beach State. Outside of his career, Gimmillaro has two children.
