= Flavia Carvalho =

Brazilian volleyball player (born 1976)

Personal information
- Nationality: Brazilian
- Born: June 19, 1976 (age 50)
- Height: 1.84 m (6 ft 0 in)
- Spike: 307 cm (121 in)
- Block: 286 cm (113 in)

Flávia Carvalho (born 19 June 1976) is a Brazilian female volleyball player.

She is played for the Brazil women's national volleyball team, at the 2001 FIVB Women's World Grand Champions Cup, and the 2001 FIVB World Grand Prix.
