= Misleidis Martínez =

Cuban volleyball player (born 1983)

Personal information
- Full name: Misleidis Martinez Adlum
- Nationality: Cuban
- Born: 9 March 1983 (age 43)
- Hometown: C. Habana
- Height: 182 cm (6 ft 0 in)
- Weight: 79 kg (174 lb)
- Spike: 322 cm (127 in)
- Block: 306 cm (120 in)

Misleidis Martínez (born 9 March 1983) is a retired Cuban volleyball player.

She was a member of the Cuba women's national volleyball team. She participated at the 2001 FIVB World Grand Prix, and 2002 FIVB World Grand Prix.
