= Andrea Berg (volleyball) =

German volleyball player (born 1981)

Personal information
- Nationality: German
- Born: January 24, 1981 (age 45); Nordhorn, Germany
Honours
Women's volleyball
Representing Germany
European Championship
Bronze medal – third place	2003 Ankara	Team competition

Andrea Berg (born January 24_{;} 1981) is a German volleyball player who was a member of the German women's team from 2001 to 2006.

She played as a middle-blocker. She participated at the 2003 Women's European Volleyball Championship, and the 2005 FIVB Volleyball World Grand Prix.
