= Patrícia Cocco =

Brazilian volleyball player (born 1971)

Personal information
- Nationality: Brazilian
- Born: 14 September 1971 (age 55); São Caetano do Sul
- Height: 176 cm (69 in)
- Weight: 61 kg (134 lb)

Career
Years	Teams
1994	Colgate/Sao Caetano

National team
1994-2001	Brazil

Patrícia Cocco (born 14 September 1971) is a retired Brazilian female volleyball player. She was part of the Brazil women's national volleyball team.

She participated in the 1994 FIVB Volleyball World Grand Prix.

On club level she played with Colgate/Sao Caetano in 1994.

== Clubs ==
- Colgate/Sao Caetano (1994)
