= Ulrike Jurk =

German volleyball player

Personal information
- Nationality: German
- Born: 2 March 1979 (age 47)
- Height: 1.75 m (5 ft 9 in)
- Weight: 68 kg (150 lb)
- Spike: 293 cm (115 in)
- Block: 281 cm (111 in)

Volleyball information

National team
- Years: Team
- –: Germany
Honours
Women's volleyball
Representing Germany
FIVB Grand Prix
Bronze medal – third place	2002 Hong Kong	Team competition

Ulrike Jurk (born 4 March 1979) is a German volleyball player.

== Career ==
She participated at the 2002 FIVB World Grand Prix.

== Clubs ==
Club	Year
VfL Bergen 94
Schweriner SC	from 2002
Romanelli Florenz	2002–2003
SV Fortschritt Neustadt-Glewe	2003–2005
