= Yoslam Muñoz =

Cuban volleyball player (born 1980)

Personal information
- Full name: Anniara Munoz Carrazana
- Nationality: Cuban
- Born: 24 January 1980 (age 46)
- Home town: Cfgs
- Height: 180 cm (5 ft 11 in)
- Weight: 69 kg (152 lb)
- Spike: 320 cm (126 in)
- Block: 312 cm (123 in)

Yoslam Muñoz (born 24 January 1980) is a Cuban volleyball player.

She was a member of the Cuba women's national volleyball team. She participated at the 2001 FIVB World Grand Prix.
