= Charlene Johnson-Tagaloa =

American volleyball player (born 1973)

Charlene Johnson-Tagaloa (born August 30, 1973) is a former indoor volleyball player. She played for the United States national team at the 2000 Summer Olympics.

Born Charlene Johnson, she was the starting setter for Brigham Young University from 1991 to 1994, reaching the NCAA Final Four in 1993.

After playing on the women's national team, Charlene Johnson-Tagaloa joined the Nebraska Huskers coaching staff in 2002 as an assistant coach, helping the Huskers win three Big 12 titles, earning a 124–10 record during the span, and a national championship in 2006.

As Charlene Johnson Whitted, Charlene served as assistant coach at the 2010 Youth Olympic Games, helping the team earn a silver medal. She served as assistant coach for the 2012 U.S. Women's Junior National Team under head coach Rod Wilde. She also served as an assistant coach for her alma mater during the 2015 women's volleyball season.
