= 2024 Big West Conference women's volleyball tournament =

2024 Big West Conference Women's Volleyball Tournament
- Classification: Division I
- Teams: 6
- Site: Bren Events Center; Irvine, California
- Champions: Hawai'i (2nd title)
- Winning coach: Robyn Ah Mow (2nd title)
- Television: ESPN+
- Big West Conference Women's Volleyball Tournaments

2024 Big West Conference women's volleyball standings
| | Conf. | | | | Overall |
| Team | W | | L | PCT | W | | L | PCT |
|---|---|---|---|---|---|---|---|---|
| Cal Poly | 14 | – | 4 | .778 | 21 | – | 8 | .724 |
| Hawaii | 13 | – | 5 | .722 | 19 | – | 9 | .679 |
| UC Davis | 13 | – | 5 | .722 | 18 | – | 9 | .667 |
| Long Beach State | 12 | – | 6 | .667 | 18 | – | 10 | .643 |
| UC San Diego | 11 | – | 7 | .611 | 17 | – | 12 | .586 |
| UC Irvine | 10 | – | 8 | .556 | 16 | – | 13 | .552 |
| UC Santa Barbara | 10 | – | 8 | .556 | 14 | – | 16 | .467 |
| Cal State Bakersfield | 6 | – | 12 | .333 | 12 | – | 18 | .400 |
| Cal State Northridge | 5 | – | 13 | .278 | 10 | – | 19 | .345 |
| UC Riverside | 5 | – | 13 | .278 | 10 | – | 21 | .323 |
| Cal State Fullerton | 0 | – | 18 | .000 | 4 | – | 24 | .143 |
† 2024 Big West tournament winner

The 2024 Big West Conference women's volleyball tournament is the second postseason women's volleyball tournament for the Big West Conference during the 2024 NCAA Division I women's volleyball season. It was held November 27 through November 30, 2024 at the Bren Events Center in Irvine, California. The winner received the conference's automatic bid to the 2024 NCAA Women's Volleyball Tournament.

== Seeds ==
The top six teams will be eligible for the postseason, with the top two seeds receiving byes to the semifinals. Teams were seeded by record within the conference, with a tiebreaker system to seed teams with identical conference records. (see section 23.15)

| Seed | School | Conference | Tiebreaker |
|---|---|---|---|
| 1 | Cal Poly | 14-4 | – |
| 2 | Hawai'i | 13-5 | 2–0 record against Cal Poly |
| 3 | UC Davis | 13–5 | 1–1 record against Cal Poly |
| 4 | Long Beach State | 12–6 | – |
| 5 | UC San Diego | 11–7 | – |
| 6 | UC Irvine | 10–8 | 2–0 record against Hawai'i (UCSB 1–1 against Hawai'i) |

== Schedule and results ==
The 1st Round and Semifinal matches will be televised on Spectrum Hawai'i and simulcast on ESPN+.

| Time Network | Matchup | Score | Attendance | Broadcasters |
Quarterfinals – Wednesday, November 27
| 3:00 pm ESPN+ | No. 4 Long Beach State vs. No. 5 UC San Diego | 3-1 (25-17,23-25,25-23,25-23) | 490 | Rob Espero & Madison Fitzpatrick |
| 6:00 pm ESPN+ | No. 3 UC Davis vs. No. 6 UC Irvine | 3-1 (20-25,25-15,25-23,25-20) | 790 | Rob Espero & Madison Fitzpatrick |
Semifinals – Friday, November 29
| 3:00 pm ESPN+ | No. 1 Cal Poly vs. Long Beach State | 3-0 (25-22,25-20,25-20) | 698 | Rob Espero & Madison Fitzpatrick |
| 6:00 pm ESPN+ | No. 2 Hawai'i vs. UC Davis | 3-2 (25-22,16-25,25-20,21-25,15-13) | 1,098 | Rob Espero & Madison Fitzpatrick |
Championship – Saturday, November 30
| 5:00 pm ESPNU | No.1 Cal Poly vs. No.2 Hawai'i | 1-3 (19-25,19-25,29-27,22-25) | 871 | Rob Espero & Madison Fitzpatrick |
Game times are PT. Rankings denote tournament seeding.

== Bracket ==
Quarterfinals; Wednesday, November 27
4 | Long Beach State (3) | 25 | 23 | 25 | 25
5 | UC San Diego (1) | 17 | 25 | 23 | 23
3 | UC Davis (3) | 20 | 25 | 25 | 25
6 | UC Irvine (1) | 25 | 15 | 23 | 20

Semifinals; Friday, November 29
1 | Cal Poly (3) | 25 | 25 | 25
4 | Long Beach State (0) | 22 | 22 | 20
2 | Hawai'i (3) | 25 | 16 | 25 | 20 | 15
3 | UC Davis (2) | 22 | 25 | 20 | 25 | 13

Championship; Saturday, November 30
1 | Cal Poly (1) | 19 | 19 | 29 | 22
2 | Hawai'i (3) | 25 | 25 | 27 | 25

== Top performers ==
By hitting percentage

| Name | K | E | TA | Pct |
|---|---|---|---|---|
| Starr, Mia | 7 | 0 | 12 | 0.583333 |
| Leinbach, Amanda | 1 | 0 | 2 | 0.500000 |
| Bamis, Jacyn | 24 | 3 | 43 | 0.488372 |
| Caldwell, Allie | 12 | 2 | 22 | 0.454545 |
| McCluskey, Molly | 14 | 4 | 24 | 0.416667 |
| Glenn, Natalie | 32 | 7 | 62 | 0.403226 |
| Chandler, Ally | 15 | 1 | 35 | 0.400000 |
| Gardiner, Ella | 11 | 3 | 23 | 0.347826 |
| Stockham, Tommi | 17 | 6 | 33 | 0.333333 |
| Pulling, Breklyn | 24 | 7 | 52 | 0.326923 |

By kill per set

| Name | K | SP | KPS |
|---|---|---|---|
| Stockham, Tommi | 17 | 3 | 5.666667 |
| Pries, Kylie | 20 | 4 | 5.000000 |
| Glenn, Natalie | 32 | 7 | 4.571429 |
| Utterback, Olivia | 37 | 9 | 4.111111 |
| Alexander, Caylen | 36 | 9 | 4.000000 |
| McCluskey, Molly | 14 | 4 | 3.500000 |
| Pulling, Breklyn | 24 | 7 | 3.428571 |
| Light, Jade | 27 | 9 | 3.000000 |
| Smith, Katie | 12 | 4 | 3.000000 |
| Karich, Abby | 20 | 7 | 2.857143 |

By Block per set(Block assist as 0.5 block)

| Name | BS | BA | SP | BPS1 |
|---|---|---|---|---|
| Lomigora, Ella | 1 | 13 | 7 | 1.071429 |
| Iselen, Ofure | 0 | 6 | 4 | 0.750000 |
| Maxwell, Madi | 0 | 7 | 7 | 0.500000 |
| Alexander, Caylen | 1 | 7 | 9 | 0.500000 |
| Riedl, Hunter | 0 | 4 | 4 | 0.500000 |
| Caldwell, Allie | 0 | 8 | 9 | 0.444444 |
| Bamis, Jacyn | 1 | 6 | 9 | 0.444444 |
| Diersbock, Reese | 2 | 3 | 9 | 0.388889 |
| Sylvester, Miliana | 0 | 7 | 9 | 0.388889 |
| Smith, Katie | 0 | 3 | 4 | 0.375000 |

By Block per set (Block assist as 1 block)

| Name | BS | BA | SP | BPS2 |
|---|---|---|---|---|
| Lomigora, Ella | 1 | 13 | 7 | 2.000000 |
| Iselen, Ofure | 0 | 6 | 4 | 1.500000 |
| Maxwell, Madi | 0 | 7 | 7 | 1.000000 |
| Riedl, Hunter | 0 | 4 | 4 | 1.000000 |
| Caldwell, Allie | 0 | 8 | 9 | 0.888889 |
| Alexander, Caylen | 1 | 7 | 9 | 0.888889 |
| Sylvester, Miliana | 0 | 7 | 9 | 0.777778 |
| Bamis, Jacyn | 1 | 6 | 9 | 0.777778 |
| Smith, Katie | 0 | 3 | 4 | 0.750000 |
| Bacon, Kameron | 0 | 5 | 7 | 0.714286 |

By Dig per set

| Name | DIG | SP | DPS |
|---|---|---|---|
| Jensen, Campbell | 21 | 4 | 5.250000 |
| Baillie, Paulina | 18 | 4 | 4.500000 |
| Hakas, Tali | 34 | 9 | 3.777778 |
| Ng, Julia | 33 | 9 | 3.666667 |
| Ikenaga, Tayli | 32 | 9 | 3.555556 |
| McCluskey, Molly | 14 | 4 | 3.500000 |
| Markovska, Lizzy | 21 | 7 | 3.000000 |
| Hurriyet, Elif | 21 | 7 | 3.000000 |
| Lang, Kate | 27 | 9 | 3.000000 |
| Stockham, Tommi | 9 | 3 | 3.000000 |

By Service Ace

| Name | SA | SP | SAPS |
|---|---|---|---|
| Utterback, Olivia | 6 | 9 | 0.666667 |
| Light, Jade | 5 | 9 | 0.555556 |
| Cordero Barr, Ximena | 4 | 9 | 0.444444 |
| Smith, Katie | 4 | 4 | 1.000000 |
| Markovska, Lizzy | 4 | 7 | 0.571429 |
| Collins, Madi | 2 | 4 | 0.500000 |
| Ikenaga, Tayli | 2 | 9 | 0.222222 |
| Stockham, Tommi | 2 | 3 | 0.666667 |
| Lang, Kate | 2 | 9 | 0.222222 |
| Leyva, Victoria | 2 | 9 | 0.222222 |
| Ng, Julia | 2 | 9 | 0.222222 |

By Assists:

| Name | A | SP | APS |
|---|---|---|---|
| Callahan, Samantha | 82 | 7 | 11.714286 |
| Hollis, Audrey | 45 | 4 | 11.250000 |
| Lang, Kate | 92 | 9 | 10.222222 |
| Starr, Mia | 91 | 9 | 10.111111 |
| Meyer, Zayna | 45 | 7 | 6.428571 |
| DeSmet, Indy | 21 | 4 | 5.250000 |
| Hayes, Maura | 30 | 7 | 4.285714 |
| Feliciano, Nicole | 16 | 4 | 4.000000 |

By total kills:

| Name | K | SP |
|---|---|---|
| Utterback, Olivia | 37 | 9 |
| Alexander, Caylen | 36 | 9 |
| Glenn, Natalie | 32 | 7 |
| Light, Jade | 27 | 9 |
| Bamis, Jacyn | 24 | 9 |
| Pulling, Breklyn | 24 | 7 |
| Hakas, Tali | 23 | 9 |
| Diersbock, Reese | 21 | 9 |
| Karich, Abby | 20 | 7 |
| Pries, Kylie | 20 | 4 |
