= 2025 Big West Conference women's volleyball tournament =

2025 Big West Conference Women's Volleyball Tournament
- Classification: Division I
- Teams: 6
- Site: Walter Pyramid; Long Beach, California
- Champions: Cal Poly (5th title)
- Winning coach: Caroline Walters (1st title)
- MVP: Chloe Leluge (Cal Poly)
- Attendance: 4,901 (980.2 per match)
- Television: ESPN+
- Big West Conference Women's Volleyball Tournaments

2025 Big West Conference women's volleyball standings
| | Conf. | | | | Overall |
| Team | W | | L | PCT | W | | L | PCT |
|---|---|---|---|---|---|---|---|---|
| UC Davis | 16 | – | 2 | .889 | 21 | – | 7 | .750 |
| No. 21 Cal Poly † | 14 | – | 4 | .778 | 27 | – | 8 | .771 |
| Long Beach State | 14 | – | 4 | .778 | 22 | – | 9 | .710 |
| UC Santa Barbara | 14 | – | 4 | .778 | 23 | – | 9 | .719 |
| CSUN | 10 | – | 8 | .556 | 17 | – | 13 | .567 |
| UC Irvine | 8 | – | 10 | .444 | 13 | – | 18 | .419 |
| Hawai'i | 8 | – | 10 | .444 | 12 | – | 17 | .414 |
| UC Riverside | 5 | – | 13 | .278 | 9 | – | 19 | .321 |
| UC San Diego | 4 | – | 14 | .222 | 6 | – | 24 | .200 |
| Cal State Fullerton | 3 | – | 15 | .167 | 8 | – | 22 | .267 |
| Cal State Bakersfield | 3 | – | 15 | .167 | 6 | – | 24 | .200 |
† 2025 Big West tournament winner As of December 22, 2025; Rankings from AVCA

The 2025 Big West Conference women's volleyball tournament is the first postseason women's volleyball tournament for the Big West Conference during the 2025 NCAA Division I women's volleyball season. It was held November 26 through November 29, 2025 at the Walter Pyramid in Long Beach, California. Cal Poly received the conference's automatic bid to the 2025 NCAA Women's Volleyball Tournament.

== Seeds ==
The top six teams were eligible for the postseason, with the top two seeds receiving byes to the semifinals. Teams were seeded by record within the conference, with a tiebreaker system to seed teams with identical conference records. CSUN qualified for the Big West Tournament for the first time since the event was introduced in 2023. UC Santa Barbara returns to the tournament after failing to finish in the top six in the 2024 season due to a tiebreaker. UC Davis, Cal Poly, Long Beach State, and UC Irvine all return to the tournament for the third season in a row. Hawai'i and UC San Diego miss the tournament after qualifying the year prior. Cal Poly, Long Beach State, UC Santa Barbara all have same conference record and same record against the other two tied-teams (2-2), therefore best record against common opponent (UC Davis) is used for tie break. UC Irvine earned the 6th spot despite having the same record as Hawai'i, winning the tiebreak in their head-to-head matchup.

| Seed | School | Conference | Tiebreaker |
|---|---|---|---|
| 1 | UC Davis | 16–2 | – |
| 2 | Cal Poly | 14-4 | 1–0 record against UC Davis |
| 3 | Long Beach State | 14–4 | 1–1 record against UC Davis |
| 4 | UC Santa Barbara | 14–4 | 0–1 record against UC Davis |
| 5 | CSUN | 10–8 | – |
| 6 | UC Irvine | 8–10 | 1–0 record against Hawai'i |

== Schedule and results ==
Every matchup was televised on ESPN+.

| Time Network | Matchup | Score | Attendance | Broadcasters |
Quarterfinals – Wednesday, November 22
| 3:00 pm ESPN+ | No. 4 UC Santa Barbara vs. No. 5 CSUN | 3–0 (25–13, 25–17, 25–18) | 916 | Madison Fizpatrick & Rob Espero |
| 6:00 pm^ ESPN+ | No. 3 Long Beach State vs. No. 6 UC Irvine | 3–0 (25–18, 25–20, 26–24) | 1,020 | Madison Fizpatrick & Rob Espero |
Semifinals – Friday, November 24
| 3:00 pm ESPN+ | No. 1 UC Davis vs. UC Santa Barbara | 3–1 (25–23, 23–25, 29–27, 27–25) | 1,018 | Madison Fizpatrick & Rob Espero |
| 6:00 pm ESPN+ | No. 2 Cal Poly vs. Long Beach State | 3–1 (25–22, 23–25, 25–23, 25–17) | 1,130 | Madison Fizpatrick & Rob Espero |
Championship – Saturday, November 25
| 5:00 pm ESPNU | No. 1 UC Davis vs. No. 2 Cal Poly | 1–3 (16–25, 21–25, 25–20, 15–25) | 817 | Madison Fizpatrick & Rob Espero |
Game times are PT. Rankings denote tournament seeding.

== Bracket ==
Quarterfinals; Wednesday, November 26
4 | UC Santa Barbara | 25 | 25 | 25
5 | CSUN | 13 | 17 | 18
3 | Long Beach State | 25 | 25 | 26
6 | UC Irvine | 18 | 20 | 24

Semifinals; Friday, November 28
1 | UC Davis | 25 | 23 | 29 | 27
4 | UC Santa Barbara | 23 | 25 | 27 | 25
2 | Cal Poly | 25 | 23 | 25 | 25
3 | Long Beach State | 22 | 25 | 23 | 17

Championship; Saturday, November 29
1 | UC Davis | 16 | 21 | 25 | 15
2 | Cal Poly | 25 | 25 | 20 | 25
