= 2023 Big West Conference women's volleyball tournament =

2023 Big West Conference Women's Volleyball Tournament
- Classification: Division I
- Teams: 6
- Site: Walter Pyramid; Long Beach, California
- Champions: Hawai'i (1st title)
- Winning coach: Robyn Ah Mow (1st title)
- MVP: Amber Igiede (Hawai'i)
- Television: ESPN+
- Big West Conference Women's Volleyball Tournaments

2023 Big West Conference women's volleyball standings
	Conf.				Overall
Team	W		L	PCT	W		L	PCT
UC Santa Barbara	17	–	1	.944	27	–	5	.844
Hawai'i†	14	–	4	.778	24	–	9	.727
Cal Poly	14	–	4	.778	21	–	11	.656
Long Beach State	13	–	5	.722	21	–	10	.677
UC San Diego*	9	–	9	.500	17	–	13	.567
UC Irvine	9	–	9	.500	11	–	19	.367
UC Davis	8	–	10	.444	13	–	16	.448
Cal State Bakersfield	5	–	13	.278	9	–	21	.300
UC Riverside	5	–	13	.278	6	–	24	.200
Cal State Northridge	4	–	14	.222	6	–	23	.207
Cal State Fullerton	1	–	17	.056	2	–	25	.074
† 2023 Big West tournament winner * ineligible for the 2023 NCAA Women's Volleyball Tournament due to transition period

The 2023 Big West Conference women's volleyball tournament is the first postseason women's volleyball tournament for the Big West Conference during the 2023 NCAA Division I women's volleyball season. It was held November 22 through November 25, 2023 at the Walter Pyramid in Long Beach, California. The winner received the conference's automatic bid to the 2023 NCAA Women's Volleyball Tournament.

== Seeds ==
The top six teams (except UC San Diego) were eligible for the postseason, with the top two seeds receiving byes to the semifinals. UC San Diego can not participate in playoffs because they are in their last year of reclassification to DI. Teams were seeded by record within the conference, with a tiebreaker system to seed teams with identical conference records.

Seed	School	Conference	Tiebreaker
1	UC Santa Barabara	17-1	–
2	Hawai'i	14-4	46-15 set record
3	Cal Poly	14–4	46-29 set record
4	Long Beach State	13–5	–
5	UC Irvine	9–9	–
6	UC Davis	8–10	–

== Schedule and results ==
The 1st Round and Semifinal matches were televised on Spectrum Hawai'i and simulcast on ESPN+.

Time Network	Matchup	Score	Attendance	Broadcasters
Quarterfinals – Wednesday, November 22
4:00 pm ESPN+	No. 4 Long Beach State vs. No. 5 UC Irvine	3-2 (25–16, 25-27, 25–14, 22–25, 15–10)	1,098	Madison Fizpatrick & Rob Espero
7:00 pm^ ESPN+	No. 3 Cal Poly vs. No. 6 UC Davis	3-2 (19–25, 20-25, 25–19, 25–22, 15–13)	1,098	Madison Fizpatrick & Rob Espero
Semifinals – Friday, November 24
4:00 pm ESPN+	No. 1 UC Santa Barbara vs. No. 4 Long Beach State	2-3 (24–26, 25-23, 17–25, 25–16, 12–15)	1,677	Madison Fizpatrick & Rob Espero
7:00 pm ESPN+	No. 2 Hawai'i vs. Cal Poly	0-3 (25–17, 25-18, 26–24)	1,677	Madison Fizpatrick & Rob Espero
Championship – Saturday, November 25
5:00 pm ESPNU	No. 4 Long Beach State vs. No. 2 Hawai'i	3-0 (24–26, 15–25, 10-25)	2,137	Madison Fizpatrick & Rob Espero
Game times are PT. Rankings denote tournament seeding.

^delay start at 7:27 pm

== Bracket ==
Quarterfinals; Wednesday, November 22
4	Long Beach State (3)	25	25	25	22	15
5	UC Irvine (2)	16	27	14	25	10
3	Cal Poly (3)	19	20	25	25	15
6	UC Davis (2)	25	25	19	22	13

Semifinals; Friday, November 24
1	UC Santa Barbara (2)	24	25	17	25	12
4	Long Beach State (3)	26	23	25	16	15
2	Hawai'i (3)	25	25	26
3	Cal Poly (0)	17	18	24

Championship; Saturday, November 25
4	Long Beach State (0)	24	15	10
2	Hawai'i (3)	26	25	25

== Top performers ==
By hitting percentage:

Name	K	E	TA	Pct
Chavira, Tia	1	0	1	1.000000
Chacon, Savana	1	0	1	1.000000
Evans, Kennedi	11	2	18	0.500000
Zhao, Michelle	1	0	2	0.500000
Igiede, Amber	28	4	49	0.489796
Scarlett, Isabella	12	1	23	0.478261
Ham, Kendra	17	3	36	0.388889
Ohwobete, Michelle	15	3	32	0.375000
Kreiling, Andi	4	1	9	0.333333
Feliciano, Nicole	1	0	3	0.333333

By kill per set:

Name	K	SP	KPS
Igiede, Amber	28	6	4.666667
Agi, Elise	47	13	3.615385
Alexander, Caylen	21	6	3.500000
Diersbock, Reese	17	5	3.400000
Wagoner, Riley	20	6	3.333333
Ohwobete, Michelle	15	5	3.000000
Stockham, Tommi	24	8	3.000000
Glenn, Natalie	37	13	2.846154
Ham, Kendra	17	6	2.833333
Light, Jade	14	5	2.800000

By block per set(block assist=0.5 block):

Name	BS	BA	SP	BPS1
Tindsley, Shkhinah	2	8	5	1.200000
McKnight, Briana	4	1	5	0.900000
Slack, Kate	2	8	8	0.750000
Alexander, Caylen	3	2	6	0.666667
Igiede, Amber	1	6	6	0.666667
Veargason, Ellen	0	2	2	0.500000
Farmer, Tasia	0	5	5	0.500000
Bacon, Kameron	1	10	13	0.461538
Glenn, Natalie	3	6	13	0.461538
Ham, Kendra	0	5	6	0.416667

By block per set(block assist=1 block):

Name	BS	BA	SP	BPS2
Tindsley, Shkhinah	2	8	5	2.000000
Slack, Kate	2	8	8	1.250000
Igiede, Amber	1	6	6	1.166667
McKnight, Briana	4	1	5	1.000000
Veargason, Ellen	0	2	2	1.000000
Farmer, Tasia	0	5	5	1.000000
Bacon, Kameron	1	10	13	0.846154
Alexander, Caylen	3	2	6	0.833333
Ham, Kendra	0	5	6	0.833333
Utterback, Olivia	0	4	5	0.800000

By Dig per set:

Name	DIG	SP	DPS
Akima, Jolei	31	8	3.875000
Jensen, Campbell	19	5	3.800000
Ham, Kendra	21	6	3.500000
Lang, Kate	20	6	3.333333
Ikenaga, Tayli	19	6	3.166667
Alexander, Caylen	19	6	3.166667
Bullis, Emme	24	8	3.000000
Starr, Mia	15	5	3.000000
Ohwobete, Michelle	13	5	2.600000
Meyer, Zayna	32	13	2.461538

By service ace:

Name	SA	SP	SAPS
Meyer, Zayna	5	13	0.384615
Ham, Kendra	5	6	0.833333
Utterback, Olivia	4	5	0.800000
Igiede, Amber	4	6	0.666667
Glenn, Natalie	4	13	0.307692
Chavira, Tia	4	13	0.307692
Markovska, Lizzy	3	8	0.375000
Morrison, Makena	3	5	0.600000
Hiatt, Amy	2	6	0.333333
Scott, Ella	2	8	0.250000
Alexander, Caylen	2	6	0.333333
Ohwobete, Michelle	2	5	0.400000
McKnight, Briana	2	5	0.400000

By assists per set:

Name	A	SP	APS
Lang, Kate	80	6	13.333333
Meyer, Zayna	116	13	8.923077
Bullis, Emme	69	8	8.625000
Feliciano, Nicole	35	5	7.000000
Starr, Mia	35	5	7.000000
McIntosh, Grace	25	5	5.000000
Zhao, Michelle	16	5	3.200000
Chacon, Savana	16	13	1.230769
Ikenaga, Tayli	7	6	1.166667
Jensen, Campbell	5	5	1.000000
Akima, Jolei	8	8	1.000000
Newman, Casi	1	1	1.000000

By total kills:

Name	K	SP
Agi, Elise	47	13
Glenn, Natalie	37	13
Kennedy, Katie	30	13
Igiede, Amber	28	6
Stockham, Tommi	24	8
Lesiak, Hanna	21	13
Alexander, Caylen	21	6
Thalken, Annabelle	21	8
Wagoner, Riley	20	6
Ham, Kendra	17	6
