= Anja-Nadin Pietrek =

German volleyball player (born 1979)

Personal information
- Nationality: German
- Born: 13 March 1979 (age 47)
- Height: 1.85 m (6 ft 1 in)
- Weight: 70 kg (154 lb)

National team
2000	Germany

Anja-Nadin Pietrek (born 13 March 1979) was a German female volleyball player. She was part of the Germany women's national volleyball team.

She competed with the national team at the 2000 Summer Olympics in Sydney, Australia, finishing 6th.

== See also ==
- Germany at the 2000 Summer Olympics
