= Anja Krause =

German volleyball player (born 1977)

Personal information
- Nationality: German
- Born: 31 January 1977 (age 49)
- Height: 183 cm (72 in)
- Weight: 70 kg (154 lb)

Volleyball information
- Number: 13 (national team)

National team
2001	Germany

Anja Krause (born 31 January 1977) was a German female volleyball player. She was part of the Germany women's national volleyball team.

She participated in the 2001 FIVB Volleyball World Grand Prix.
