= Tara Cross-Battle =

American volleyball player

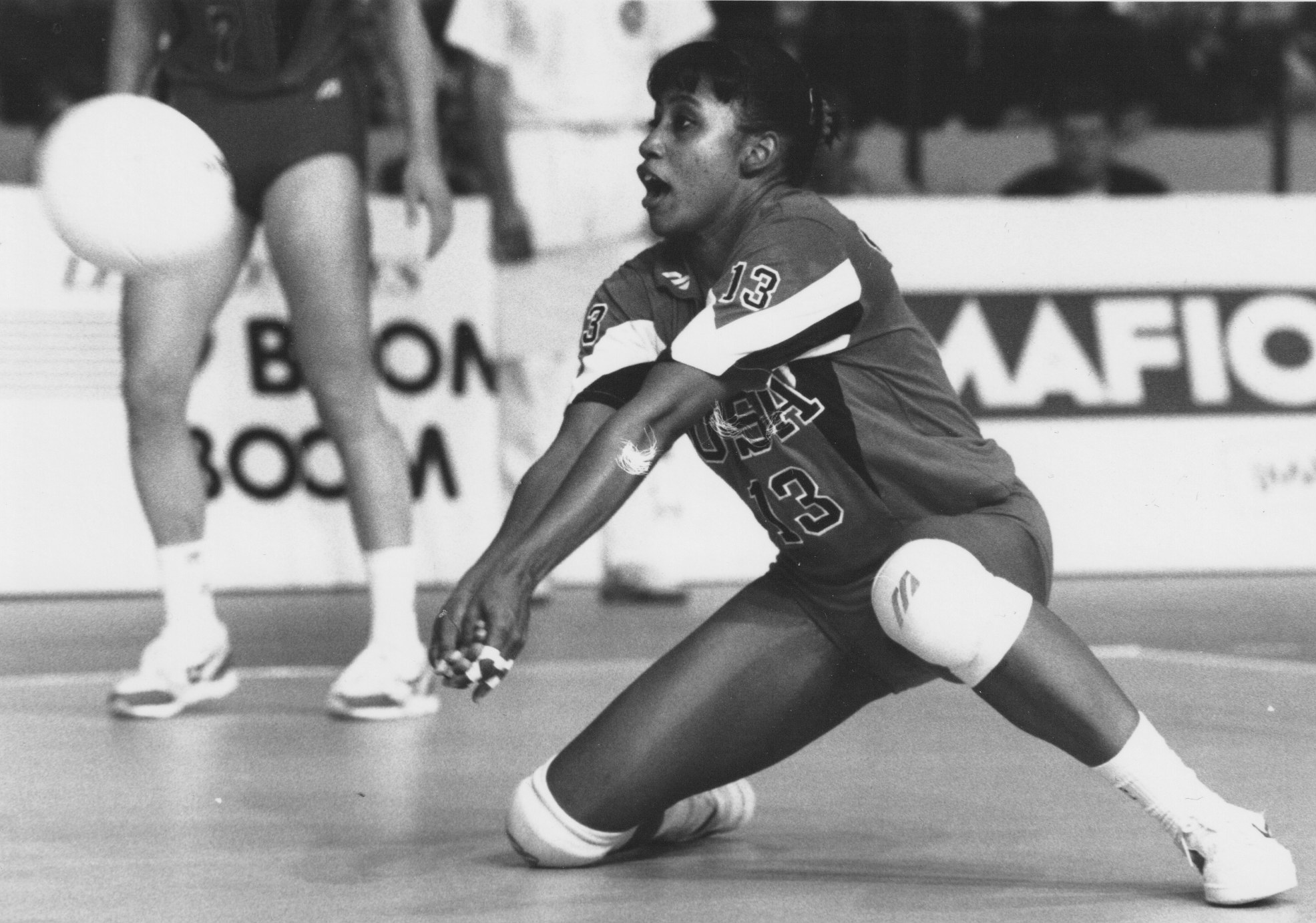

Personal information
- Full name: Tara Lavell Cross-Battle
- Born: September 16, 1968 (age 58); Houston, Texas, U.S.
- Height: 6 ft 0 in (183 cm)
- Education: California State University, Long Beach

Volleyball information
- Position: Outside hitter
- Number: 13

National team
1989–2004	United States
Medal record
Women's volleyball
Representing the United States
Olympic Games
Bronze medal – third place	1992 Barcelona	Team
FIVB World Championship
Silver medal – second place	2002 Germany	Team
Bronze medal – third place	1990 China	Team
FIVB World Cup
Bronze medal – third place	2003 Japan
FIVB World Grand Prix
Gold medal – first place	1995 Shanghai
Gold medal – first place	2001 Macau
Bronze medal – third place	2003 Andria
Bronze medal – third place	2004 Reggio Calabria
NORCECA Championship
Gold medal – first place	2001 Santo Domingo
Silver medal – second place	1991 Regina
Silver medal – second place	1993 New Orleans
Pan American Games
Silver medal – second place	1995 Mar del Plata	Team

Tara Cross-Battle (born September 16, 1968) is a retired volleyball player from the United States who competed in four Summer Olympics overall, starting in 1992. Cross-Battle won the bronze medal with the United States women's national team at the 1992 Summer Olympics in Barcelona. Her last Olympic appearance was at the 2004 Summer Olympics in Athens.

While representing the United States, Cross-Battle won a bronze medal at the 1990 FIVB World Championship in China and a silver medal at the 2002 FIVB World Championship in Germany. She also won a bronze medal at the 2003 FIVB World Cup in Japan.

For her career achievements in volleyball, Cross-Battle was inducted into the International Volleyball Hall of Fame in 2014.

== College ==
Cross-Battle played NCAA women's volleyball for Long Beach State University, where she led her team to the 1989 NCAA Championship title. She was selected as the AVCA Player of the Year in 1988 and 1989. In 1990, she won the Honda-Broderick Award (now the Honda Sports Award) as the nation's best female collegiate volleyball player. She set the NCAA record for career kills with 2,767, and was a four-time All-American.

In 1995, Cross-Battle was inducted into the Long Beach State Hall of Fame.

== Coaching ==
Cross-Battle is currently coaching at the Houston Juniors Volleyball Club. She has also worked with the Texas Tornados Volleyball Club and the Texas Pride Volleyball Club.

== Clubs ==
- (Italy) Pallavolo Ancona (1992–1995)
- (Brazil) Leites Nestlé (1996–1999)
- (Brazil) Paraná Vôlei Clube (1999–2000)
- (Brazil) Flamengo (2000–2001)
- (Italy) Volley Bergamo (2001–2002)
- (Italy) Reggio Emilia (2002–2003)

== International competitions ==
- 1990 – Goodwill Games (5th place)
- 1990 – World Championship (bronze)
- 1991 – NORCECA Championships (silver)
- 1991 – World Cup (4th place)
- 1992 – Summer Olympics (bronze)
- 1992 – FIVB Super Four (bronze)
- 1993 – NORCECA Championships (silver)
- 1993 – World Grand Prix (7th place)
- 1993 – FIVB Grand Champions Cup (4th place)
- 1994 – World Grand Prix (6th place)
- 1994 – World Championship (6th place)
- 1995 – Pan American Games (silver)
- 1995 – Canada Cup (gold)
- 1995 – World Grand Prix (gold)
- 1995 – World Cup (7th place)
- 1996 – Summer Olympics (7th place)
- 2000 – Summer Olympics (4th place)
- 2001 – NORCECA Championships (gold)
- 2001 – World Grand Prix (gold)
- 2002 – World Championship (silver)
- 2002 – World Grand Prix (6th place)
- 2003 – World Grand Prix (bronze)
- 2003 – World Cup (bronze)
- 2004 – World Grand Prix (bronze)
- 2004 – Summer Olympics (5th place)

== Individual awards ==
- Four-time All-American
- 1990 – Honda-Broderick Award
- 1995 – Long Beach State Hall of Fame
- 2001 – NORCECA Championship "Most Valuable Player"
- 2014 – International Volleyball Hall of Fame

Awards
Preceded by (Brazil) Fernanda Venturini	Most Valuable Player of FIVB World Grand Prix; 1995	Succeeded by (Brazil) Leila Barros
