= Big West Conference =

NCAA Division I collegiate athletic conference in the western United States

- Formerly: Pacific Coast Athletic Association (1969–1988)
- Association: NCAA
- Founded: July 1, 1969; 57 years ago
- Commissioner: Dan Butterly (since July 1, 2020)
- Sports fielded: 19; men's: 9; women's: 10
- Division: Division I
- Subdivision: Non–football
- No. of teams: 12 (10 in 2027)
- Headquarters: Irvine, California
- Region: West Coast
- Broadcasters: ESPN; Spectrum SportsNet
- Website: www.bigwest.org

Locations
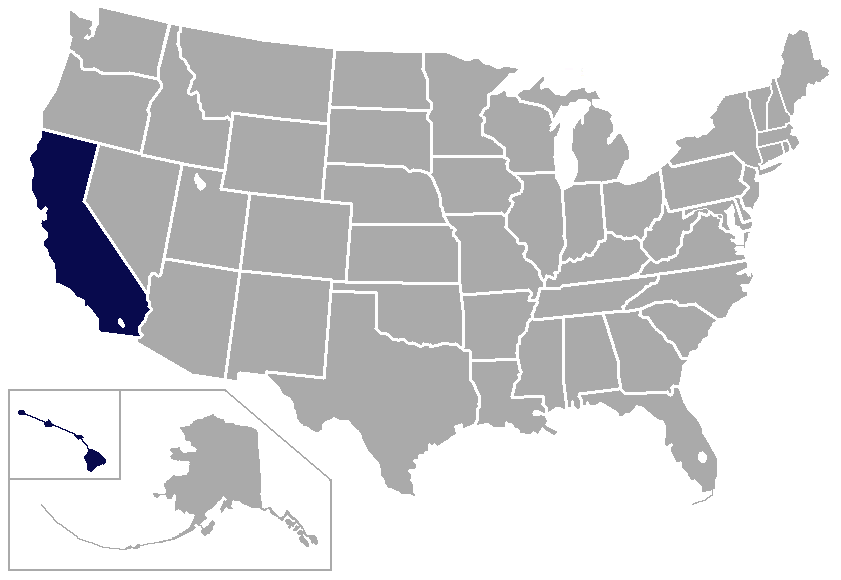

The Big West Conference (BWC) is an American collegiate athletic conference whose member institutions participate in the National Collegiate Athletic Association's Division I. The conference was originally formed on July 1, 1969, as the Pacific Coast Athletic Association (PCAA), and in 1988 was renamed the Big West Conference. The conference stopped sponsoring college football after the 2000 season.

Among the conference's 12 member institutions, 11 are located in California (ten in Southern California alone), and one is located in Utah. All but one of the current schools are public universities. Historically, the California schools evenly split between the California State University and the University of California systems, however the loss of UC Davis in 2026 changed this. In addition, one affiliate member plays three sports in the BWC not sponsored by its home conference, with more joining in the 2027–28 season.

== History ==
Big West Conference Members locations
– Full members
– Departing members
Big West Conference Members locations
– Full members
Big West Conference Members locations
– Affiliate members

=== Pacific Coast Athletic Association ===
The Big West Conference was formed in June 1968 as the Pacific Coast Athletic Association. The five original charter members were Fresno State, San Jose State, UC Santa Barbara, San Diego State, and Long Beach State. Two other schools, Cal State Los Angeles and the University of the Pacific, were also considered but they declined at that time to pursue membership. The newly formed conference had several meetings to set up its governance, which was confirmed in October 1968 on the campus of UC Santa Barbara. Before the league started play, Cal State Los Angeles joined as a full member and the University of the Pacific joined for football only, becoming a full member itself two years later. The conference itself lists July 1, 1969, as its founding date, with the seven institutions beginning conference play that fall.

=== Evolution ===
Since its inception as the Pacific Coast Athletic Association, the conference has seen many changes. Utah State was the first institution outside California to join the conference in 1978. This opened the floodgates for many other schools to affiliate with the PCAA; notable schools include UNLV, Nevada, Louisiana Tech, Boise State, and football-only members, such as Southwestern Louisiana and Arkansas State.

In 1983, the PCAA became the first western conference to introduce women's athletic programs, allowing female student-athletes to compete at the same level as their male counterparts. This proved vital for Hawaiʻi as their only participation in the conference was for their women's sports.

However, many universities left to join conferences that were perceived as more well-known, such as the Western Athletic Conference or the Mountain West Conference, while others did not see the benefit of travel since historically many of the teams have been California-based.

From the departures of Idaho and Utah State in 2005 until the arrival of Hawaiʻi in 2012, all members were based in California, reducing the cost and travel time between the universities. When Hawaiʻi joined, it agreed to help defray a portion of travel costs to that state for the league's California members.

In 2011, San Diego State University and Boise State University had initially agreed to move all sports except football to the Big West by 2013. However, when the Big East decided to no longer sponsor football for the 2013 season, both San Diego State and Boise State backed out of their agreement with the Big West, electing to remain members of the Mountain West instead.

Upon numerous conference shifts spurred from the announcement that UCLA and USC of the Pac-12 were to move to Big Ten, a domino effect occurred, ultimately resulting in both Hawaiʻi and UC Davis announcing their move to the Mountain West effective the 2026 school year.

This would leave the Big West with 9 teams, and with the remaining member universities hoping to keep the conference at at least 11 teams, the Big West invited both California Baptist University and Utah Valley University to join the conference by the 2026 school year. Both institutions have since announced their respective intentions to join the conference, marking it the first time since 2013 that a private university will compete in the Big West, and the first time since 2005 that the Big West will have a member in the continental U.S. outside of California. Later in June, Sacramento State announced its intention to join the Big West in all sports except football, effective by the 2026 school year, when they will join alongside California Baptist and Utah Valley.

On September 3, 2025, UC San Diego formally accepted an invite to the West Coast Conference for the 2027–28 season after Gonzaga announced their departure to the rebuilt Pac-12 for the 2026–27 season earlier that year. Seven months after, on April 10, 2026, UC Santa Barbara formally accepted an invite to the West Coast Conference for the 2027–28 season alongside UC San Diego. This would end their 51 years of continual conference membership, the second longest among all current and former members.

There have been no more than 35 full and associate members in the conference's history, while only two of the original seven charter members remain (Long Beach State and UC Santa Barbara, with only Long Beach State's membership being continuous).

=== The change to the Big West ===
Effective July 1, 1988, the Pacific Coast Athletic Association changed its name to the Big West Conference. With such schools as Utah State, UNLV, Nevada, New Mexico State, and Hawaiʻi now in the fold, the name change was more representative of its member institutions. In addition, the conference had signed a contract with ESPN to have its men's basketball games telecast as the third game of a triple header known as Big Monday - the other conferences being featured were the Big East and the Big Ten so the name Big West fit the theme.

The logo of the Big West from 2000 to 2021

== Member schools ==
=== Current full members ===
Members departing for the West Coast Conference in 2027.

Institution	Location	Founded	Type	Enrollment	Median Earnings	Endowment (millions – FY25)	Nickname	Joined (Note: Represents the calendar year when fall sports competition begins.)	Colors
California Baptist University (Cal Baptist)	Riverside, California	1950	Baptist (Note: The university is the first private institution of higher education to compete in the Big West since Pacific left at the end of the 2012–13 school year.)	11,491	$68,600	$186.08	Lancers	2026	
California Polytechnic State University (Cal Poly)	San Luis Obispo, California (Note: The Cal Poly campus has a San Luis Obispo mailing address, but is located outside the city limits in unincorporated San Luis Obispo County.)	1901	Public (Note: Part of the California State University System.)	22,287	$90,662	$335.82	Mustangs	1996 (Note: Then Division II, Cal Poly San Luis Obispo competed as an affiliate member of the Big West (then known as the PCAA) for women's volleyball from the 1984 to 1989 fall seasons (1984–85 to 1989–90 school years).)	
California State University, Bakersfield (Cal State Bakersfield, Bakersfield)	Bakersfield, California	1965	Public	9,261	$59,109	$46.51	Roadrunners	2020 (Note: Before becoming a full member, Cal State Bakersfield competed in the Big West as an affiliate for beach volleyball since the 2016 spring season (2015–16 school year).)	
California State University, Fullerton (Cal State Fullerton)	Fullerton, California	1957	Public	38,726	$63,753	$162.08	Titans	1974	
California State University, Long Beach (Long Beach State)	Long Beach, California	1949	Public	39,360	$63,140	$216.65	Beach (Note: Long Beach State fully rebranded its athletic program as Beach effective in the 2020–21 school year, after transitioning from its former nickname of 49ers over several years. The baseball team continues to use the nickname Dirtbags, which it had adopted in the 49ers era.)	1969	
California State University, Northridge (CSUN, Cal State Northridge)	Los Angeles, California	1958	Public	38,511	$59,664	$249.51	Matadors	2001	
California State University, Sacramento (Sacramento State)	Sacramento, California	1947	Public	31,181	$64,511	$96.41	Hornets	2026 (Note: Before becoming a full member, Sacramento State had competed in the Big West as an affiliate member for various sports dating back to 1996. These sports included: baseball between the 1997 and 2002 spring seasons (1996–97 and 2001–02 school years); men's soccer since the 2012 fall season (2012–13 school year); beach volleyball since the 2016 spring season (2015–16 school year); men's golf during the 2025 spring season (2024–25 school year))	
University of California, Irvine (UC Irvine)	Irvine, California	1965	Public (Note: Part of the University of California System.)	37,243	$74,438	$1,028.00	Anteaters	1977	
University of California, Riverside (UC Riverside)	Riverside, California	1954	Public	26,809	$64,926	$321.52	Highlanders	2001	
University of California, San Diego (UC San Diego)	San Diego, California	1960	Public	42,968	$83,130	$1,792.38	Tritons	2020 (Note: UC San Diego first competed in the Big West as an affiliate member for men's volleyball since the 2018 spring season (2017–18 school year). It added women's water polo to its Big West membership since the 2020 spring season (2019–20 school year).)	
University of California, Santa Barbara (UC Santa Barbara)	Santa Barbara, California (Note: The UCSB campus has a Santa Barbara mailing address, but is located outside the city limits in the unincorporated community of Isla Vista.)	1891	Public	26,421	$70,323	$830.35	Gauchos	1969; 1976 (Note: UC Santa Barbara joined the Big West when it was founded in 1969, left to become an NCAA Division I Independent after the 1973–74 school year, then rejoined the conference in 1976–77.)	
Utah Valley University (Utah Valley)	Orem, Utah	1941	Public	48,670	$66,978	$129.70	Wolverines	2026	

=== Affiliate members ===
Institution	Location	Founded	Type	Enrollment	Nickname	Joined (Note: Represents the calendar year when fall sports competition begins.)	Big West sport(s)	Primary conference
University of Hawaiʻi at Mānoa (Hawaiʻi)	Honolulu, Hawaii	1907	Public (Note: Part of the University of Hawaiʻi System.)	19,074	Rainbow Warriors & Rainbow Wahine (Note: The Hawaiʻi beach volleyball team is officially Rainbow Wahine, but more commonly uses the nickname BeachBows.)	2026 (Note: While the school had been a full Big West member from 2012 to 2026, the 2026–27 school year is its first as an affiliate member. Initially Hawaiʻi was set to compete in men's swimming and diving, but the Mountain West announced it would begin sponsoring the sport in 2026.)	Beach volleyball	Mountain West
University of Hawaiʻi at Mānoa (Hawaiʻi)	Honolulu, Hawaii	1907	Public	19,074	Rainbow Warriors & Rainbow Wahine	2026	Men's volleyball	Mountain West
University of Hawaiʻi at Mānoa (Hawaiʻi)	Honolulu, Hawaii	1907	Public	19,074	Rainbow Warriors & Rainbow Wahine	2026	Women's water polo	Mountain West

=== Future affiliate members ===
Institution	Location	Founded	Type	Enrollment	Nickname	Joined (Note: Represents the calendar year when fall sports competition begins.)	Big West sport(s)	Primary conference
United States Air Force Academy (Air Force)	Air Force Academy, Colorado	1954	Federal military academy	4,181	Falcons	2027	Men's water polo	Mountain West
California State University, Fresno (Fresno State)	Fresno, California	1911	Public (Note: Part of California State University.)	25,497	Bulldogs	2027	Women's water polo	Pac-12
Grand Canyon University	Phoenix, Arizona	1949	Private	103,427	Antelopes	2027	Beach volleyball	Mountain West
San Diego State University	San Diego, California	1897	Public	39,241	Aztecs	2027	Women's water polo	Pac-12
San Jose State University (San José State)	San Jose, California	1857	Public	37,133	Spartans	2027	Beach volleyball	Mountain West
San Jose State University (San José State)	San Jose, California	1857	Public	37,133	Spartans	2027	Men's water polo	Mountain West
San Jose State University (San José State)	San Jose, California	1857	Public	37,133	Spartans	2027	Women's water polo	Mountain West
University of California, San Diego (UC San Diego)	San Diego, California	1960	Public (Note: Part of the University of California.)	42,968	Tritons	2027 (Note: UC San Diego first competed in the Big West as an affiliate member for men's volleyball since the 2018 spring season (2017–18 school year). It added women's water polo to its Big West membership since the 2020 spring season (2019–20 school year).)	Men's Track and Field	Big West (WCC in 2027)
University of California, San Diego (UC San Diego)	San Diego, California	1960	Public	42,968	Tritons	2027	Women's Track and Field	Big West (WCC in 2027)
University of California, San Diego (UC San Diego)	San Diego, California	1960	Public	42,968	Tritons	2027	Men's Volleyball	Big West (WCC in 2027)
University of California, San Diego (UC San Diego)	San Diego, California	1960	Public	42,968	Tritons	2027	Women's water polo	Big West (WCC in 2027)
University of California, Santa Barbara (UC Santa Barbara)	Santa Barbara, California (Note: The UCSB campus has a Santa Barbara mailing address, but is located outside the city limits in the unincorporated community of Isla Vista.)	1891	Public	26,421	Gauchos	2027 (Note: UC Santa Barbara joined the Big West when it was founded in 1969, left to become an NCAA Division I Independent after the 1973–74 school year, then rejoined the conference in 1976–77.)	Men's Track and Field	Big West (WCC in 2027)
University of California, Santa Barbara (UC Santa Barbara)	Santa Barbara, California	1891	Public	26,421	Gauchos	2027	Women's Track and Field	Big West (WCC in 2027)
University of California, Santa Barbara (UC Santa Barbara)	Santa Barbara, California	1891	Public	26,421	Gauchos	2027	Men's Volleyball	Big West (WCC in 2027)

=== Former members ===
Many of the former members of the Big West are now members of the Pac-12 Conference or the Mountain West Conference. For a time, many had been members of the Western Athletic Conference (WAC; since renamed the United Athletic Conference). Of the nine schools that were in the WAC before its early-2010s realignment, only Hawaiʻi had not spent some time in the Big West as a football participant – it was a Big West member only in women's sports. Of the former members, Cal State Los Angeles is the only team that reverted to Division II level.

School names and nicknames reflect those used by the institutions when they were Big West members. One school has changed its name (Southwestern Louisiana, now branded athletically as Louisiana and also known as Louisiana–Lafayette) and another its nickname (Arkansas State, from Indians to Red Wolves).

==== Former full members ====
Institution	Location	Founded	Type	Nickname	Joined (Note: Represents the calendar year when fall sports competition begins.)	Left (Note: Represents the calendar year when spring sports competition ends.)	Current primary conference
Boise State University	Boise, Idaho	1932	Public	Broncos	1996	2001	Pac-12
California State University, Fresno (Fresno State)	Fresno, California	1911	Public (Note: Part of the California State University System.)	Bulldogs	1969	1992	Pac-12
California State University, Los Angeles (CSULA, Cal State L.A.)	Los Angeles, California	1947	Public	Golden Eagles	1969	1974	California (CCAA) (Note: Currently an NCAA Division II athletic conference.)
University of California, Davis	Davis, California	1905	Public (Note: Part of the University of California System.)	Aggies	2007	2026	Mountain West (MW)
University of Hawaiʻi at Mānoa	Honolulu, Hawaii	1907	Public	Rainbow Warriors & Rainbow Wahine	2012	2026	Mountain West (MW)
University of Idaho	Moscow, Idaho	1889	Public	Vandals	1996	2005	Big Sky (BSC)
University of Nevada, Las Vegas (UNLV)	Las Vegas, Nevada (Note: The UNLV campus lies outside the Las Vegas city limits in the unincorporated community of Paradise. The U.S. Postal Service considers all unincorporated areas in the Las Vegas Valley to have a Las Vegas address.)	1957	Public	Rebels	1982	1996	Mountain West (MW)
University of Nevada, Reno	Reno, Nevada	1874	Public	Wolf Pack	1992	2000	Mountain West (MW)
New Mexico State University	Las Cruces, New Mexico	1888	Public	Aggies	1983	2000	Conf. USA (CUSA)
University of North Texas	Denton, Texas	1890	Public	Mean Green	1996	2000	American
University of the Pacific	Stockton, California	1851	United; Methodist	Tigers	1971	2013	West Coast (WCC)
San Diego State University	San Diego, California	1897	Public	Aztecs	1969	1978	Pac-12
San Jose State University	San Jose, California	1857	Public	Spartans	1969	1996	Mountain West (MW)
Utah State University	Logan, Utah	1888	Public	Aggies	1978	2005	Pac-12

==== Former affiliate members ====
Institution	Location	Founded	Type	Nickname	Joined (Note: Represents the calendar year when fall sports competition begins.)	Left (Note: Represents the calendar year when spring sports competition ends.)	Big West sport(s)	Primary conference
California State Polytechnic University, Pomona (Cal Poly Pomona)	Pomona, California	1938	Public	Broncos	1984	1990	Softball	California (CCAA) (Note: Currently an NCAA Division II athletic conference.)
Grand Canyon University	Phoenix, Arizona	1949	Private	Antelopes	2025	2026	Men's swimming and diving	Mountain West
University of Hawaiʻi at Mānoa (Hawaiʻi)	Honolulu, Hawaii	1907	Public	Rainbow Warriors & Rainbow Wahine (Note: The Hawaiʻi beach volleyball team is officially Rainbow Wahine, but more commonly uses the nickname BeachBows.)	1984	1996	Women's sports	Mountain West (MW)
University of Idaho	Moscow, Idaho	1889	Public	Vandals	2024	2025	Men's golf	Big Sky (BSC)
California State University, Sacramento (Sacramento State)	Sacramento, California	1947	Public	Hornets	1996	2002	Baseball	Big West (BWC)
California State University, Sacramento (Sacramento State)	Sacramento, California	1947	Public	Hornets	2012	2026	Men's soccer	Big West (BWC)
California State University, Sacramento (Sacramento State)	Sacramento, California	1947	Public	Hornets	2015	2026	Beach volleyball	Big West (BWC)
California State University, Sacramento (Sacramento State)	Sacramento, California	1947	Public	Hornets	2024	2025	Men's golf	Big West (BWC)
University of San Diego	San Diego, California	1949	Catholic (Diocese of San Diego)	Toreros	2025	2026	Women's swimming and diving	West Coast (WCC)
San Diego State University	San Diego, California	1897	Public	Aztecs	1984	1990	Women's sports	Pac-12
San Diego State University	San Diego, California	1897	Public	Aztecs	2012	2013	Women's water polo	Pac-12
Seattle University	Seattle, Washington	1891	Catholic (Jesuit)	Redhawks	2025	2026	Men's swimming and diving	West Coast (WCC)
Seattle University	Seattle, Washington	1891	Catholic (Jesuit)	Redhawks	2025	2026	Women's swimming and diving	West Coast (WCC)

==== Former football-only members ====
Institution	Location	Founded	Type	Nickname	Joined (Note: Represents the calendar year when fall sports competition begins.)	Left (Note: Represents the calendar year when spring sports competition ends.)	Primary conference at the time of joining Big West football	Current conference
Arkansas State University	Jonesboro, Arkansas	1909	Public	Indians (Note: Currently known as the Arkansas State Red Wolves.)	1993	1996	Sun Belt (SBC)	
Arkansas State University	Jonesboro, Arkansas	1909	Public	Indians	1999	2001 (Note: Arkansas State joined the Big West for football in the 1993 fall season (1993–94 school year), left to become an independent after the 1995 fall season (1995–96 school year), then re-joined in the 1999 fall season (1999–2000 school year), only to leave again after the 2000 fall season (2000–01 school year).)	Sun Belt (SBC)	
Louisiana Tech University	Ruston, Louisiana	1894	Public	Bulldogs	1993	1996	Sun Belt (SBC)	
Northern Illinois University	DeKalb, Illinois	1895	Public	Huskies	1993	1996	Mid-Continent (Note: Currently known as the Summit League.)	Mountain West (MW) (Note: Northern Illinois is an MW member only in football and women's gymnastics, with most other sports in the Horizon League.)
University of Southwestern Louisiana (Note: Currently known as the University of Louisiana at Lafayette since 1999, and branded for athletics purposes as "Louisiana" since 2017.)	Lafayette, Louisiana	1898	Public	Ragin'; Cajuns	1993	1996	Sun Belt (SBC)	
University of the Pacific	Stockton, California	1851	United; Methodist	Tigers	1969	1971 (Note: Pacific joined the Big West as a football-only member from the 1969 fall season (1969–70 school year); which would later became a full member from 1971–72 to 2012–13.)	West Coast (WCC)	N/A

=== Membership timeline ===
Full member (all sports) Full member (non-football) Associate member (football) Associate member (sport) Other Conference Other Conference

Notes

- San Diego State played football as an independent for the 1976 and 1977 seasons before leaving the Big West Conference in 1978.
- UC Santa Barbara was an independent from 1974–75 to 1975–76.
- Cal State Fullerton played football as an independent for the 1992 season and dropped football entirely the following year.
- Louisiana Tech, Northern Illinois, Southwestern Louisiana, and Arkansas State joined the Big West for a short-lived football consortium from 1993 to 1995.
- Arkansas State played football as an independent from 1996 to 1998 and later rejoined the Big West for football during the 1999 and 2000 seasons.

== Sports ==
The Big West Conference currently sponsors 21 NCAA sports, with men's and women's swimming & diving the newest additions for the 2024–25 school year. The Big West is considered a mid-major conference, the term itself coined in 1977.

In baseball, Cal State Fullerton has won four College World Series titles with national championships in 1979, 1984, 1995, and 2004. In addition, Long Beach State and UC Irvine have made multiple appearances in the College World Series. The Big West is the only existing mid-major conference to have multiple teams make the College World Series in the same year, with Cal State Fullerton and Fresno State both making it in 1988, Long Beach State and Fresno in 1991, and Fullerton and UC Irvine in 2007. Fullerton also has a national championship in softball, winning in 1986. Hawaiʻi joined the conference in women's sports only between 1984 and 1996, and won the 1987 NCAA women's volleyball title. Long Beach State has won three NCAA women's volleyball titles as a part of Big West Conference women's volleyball, with national championships in 1989, 1993, and 1998. Misty May-Treanor led the 49ers (now known as Beach) to a 36–0 record en route to the program's most recent title. UC Santa Barbara was the NCAA men's soccer runner-up in 2004, losing the national championship match to Indiana on penalty kicks. The Gauchos returned to the College Cup in 2006 and won the national championship.

Former Big West members UNLV and Pacific won national championships while part of the conference. The UNLV Runnin' Rebels men's basketball team won the 1990 NCAA tournament championship after routing Duke 103–73 in the national title game. UNLV was undefeated during the 1991 NCAA men's basketball season before falling to Duke in the final four. The Runnin' Rebels during this era are widely considered one of the best college basketball teams of all time. The Pacific Tigers women's volleyball team won back-to-back national championships in 1985 and 1986.

The Big West did not sponsor men's volleyball or men's water polo, but it was the primary conference affiliation of several schools that compete in the Mountain Pacific Sports Federation for these sports, respectively. In NCAA men's volleyball, UC Irvine has established itself as one of the nation's most elite programs, winning four national championships in 2007, 2009, 2012, and 2013. Long Beach State also won men's national volleyball titles in 1991, 2018, 2019, and 2025, three while in the Big West. Hawaiʻi also won men's national volleyball titles in 2021, 2022, and 2026. In NCAA men's water polo, UC Irvine won three national championships in 1970, 1982, and 1989. UC Santa Barbara also won a men's water polo title in 1979.

On May 31, 2016, the Big West announced the conference would sponsor men's volleyball as its 18th sport, with five Big West schools leaving the MPSF to establish the new men's volleyball league. Men's volleyball is the third of four sports in which the MPSF has recently seen a mass exodus of teams to join an existing conference in a newly sponsored sport, with men's soccer, men's water polo, and women's lacrosse as the others. The men's volleyball membership includes core Big West members Cal State Northridge, Long Beach State, Hawaiʻi, UC Irvine, and UC Santa Barbara. UC San Diego joined as an affiliate to bring the league to the NCAA minimum requirement of 6 teams to receive an automatic bid for the NCAA tournament.

Big West Commissioner Dennis Farrell explained that adding UC San Diego was not an indicator UC San Diego would be added to the Big West Conference as a full member. UC San Diego had recently passed a bill to move all their sports to Division I and was looking for an invite from the Big West Conference. UC San Diego has long competed at the Division I level in men's volleyball; the NCAA conducts a single national championship open to all Division I and II members, and scholarship limits in the sport are the same in both divisions. The Big West regular season for men's volleyball will be a double round-robin, with each team playing the others once at home and once on the road. The Big West Tournament will have all six teams participate in single-elimination rounds with the top two teams receiving semifinal byes.

The Big West is the first Division I all-sports conference (defined as a league that sponsors men's and women's basketball) ever to sponsor men's volleyball, and the second NCAA all-sports conference overall to sponsor men's volleyball as a scholarship sport (the first was the Division II Conference Carolinas).

On November 26, 2017, the Big West announced that it would add UC San Diego along with Cal State Bakersfield as its 10th and 11th members starting on July 1, 2020. Cal State Bakersfield, which was already a full Division I member competing in the Western Athletic Conference, became a full member effective July 1, 2020. UC San Diego, which had failed to move up from Division II in failed bids to the Big West in 2011 and April 2017, has begun the four-year transition process to Division I and became a full member effective July 1, 2024. UC San Diego's men's volleyball joined the Big West in 2017, in advance of that sport's 2018 season, and women's water polo joined in 2019. Because the NCAA does not sponsor a Division II championship in either men's volleyball or women's water polo, UCSD was eligible for conference championships in both sports upon joining the Big West, and remained eligible for such during the D-I transition.

UC San Diego and Cal State Bakersfield, the latter now in the process of rebranding its athletic program as Bakersfield, officially joined the conference on July 1, 2020, and Dan Butterly became the new commissioner following the retirement of Dennis Farrell. UC San Diego officially joined Division I ranks on July 1, 2024, and thus could compete in conference championships and NCAA playoffs from then on.

Big West Conference teams
Sport	Men's	Women's
Baseball	12	–
Basketball	12	12
Beach volleyball	–	6
Cross Country	11	12
Golf	10	10
Soccer	11*	12
Softball	–	11
Tennis	6	9
Track and Field (Outdoor)	12	12
Volleyball	6	12
Water polo	6	8

=== Men's sponsored sports by school ===
School	Baseball	Basketball	Cross Country	Golf	Soccer	Tennis	Track & Field (Outdoor)	Volleyball	Water polo	Total Sports
Bakersfield	Yes	Yes	No	No	Yes	No	Yes	No	No	4
California Baptist	Yes	Yes	Yes	No	Yes (Note: Cal Poly, California Baptist, UC Riverside, and UC San Diego will play men's soccer in the Pac-12 Conference in the 2026 season, with all but UCSD continuing to do so beyond that season.)	No	Yes	No	Yes	6
Cal Poly	Yes	Yes	Yes	Yes	Yes	Yes	Yes	No	No	7
Cal State Fullerton	Yes	Yes	Yes	Yes	Yes	No	Yes	No	Yes	7
Cal State Northridge	Yes	Yes	Yes	Yes	Yes	No	Yes	Yes	No	7
Long Beach State	Yes	Yes	Yes	Yes	No	No	Yes	Yes	Yes	7
Sacramento State	Yes	Yes	Yes	Yes	Yes	Yes	Yes	No	No	7
UC Irvine	Yes	Yes	Yes	Yes	Yes	Yes	Yes	Yes	Yes	9
UC Riverside	Yes	Yes	Yes	Yes	Yes	Yes	Yes	No	No	7
UC San Diego	Yes	Yes	Yes	Yes	Yes	Yes	Yes	Yes	Yes	9
UC Santa Barbara	Yes	Yes	Yes	Yes	Yes	Yes	Yes	Yes	Yes	9
Utah Valley	Yes	Yes	Yes	Yes	Yes	No	Yes	No	No	6
Totals	12	12	11	10	11	6	12	5+1 (Note: Affiliate member Hawai'i.)	6	86+1

Men's varsity sports not sponsored by the Big West Conference which are played by Big West schools
School	Fencing	Football (Note: Sacramento State competes at the FBS level, while Cal Poly competes at the FCS level.)	Rowing (Note: The only category of rowing sponsored by the NCAA is women's heavyweight rowing. Men's rowing and women's lightweight rowing are organized by the Intercollegiate Rowing Association.)	Swimming and Diving	Track & Field (Indoor)	Wrestling
Bakersfield	No	No	No	MPSF	No	Pac-12
Cal Poly	No	Big Sky	No	No	Independent	Pac-12
Cal State Fullerton	No	No	No	No	MPSF	No
Cal State Northridge	No	No	No	No	MPSF	No
Long Beach State	No	No	ACRA	No	MPSF	No
Sacramento State	No	MAC	No	No	MPSF	No
UC Irvine	No	No	ACRA	No	No	No
UC Riverside	No	No	No	No	MPSF	No
UC San Diego	MPSF	No	MPSF	MPSF	No	No
UC Santa Barbara	No	No	ACRA	MPSF	Independent	No
Utah Valley	No	No	No	No	MPSF	Big 12

=== Women's sponsored sports by school ===
School	Basketball	Beach Volleyball	Cross Country	Golf	Soccer	Softball	Tennis	Track & Field (Outdoor)	Volleyball	Water polo	Total Sports
Bakersfield	Yes	Yes	Yes	Yes	Yes	Yes	No	Yes	Yes	No	8
California Baptist	Yes	No	Yes	Yes	Yes	Yes	No	Yes	Yes	Yes	8
Cal Poly	Yes	Yes	Yes	Yes	Yes	Yes	Yes	Yes	Yes	No	9
Cal State Fullerton	Yes	No	Yes	Yes	Yes	Yes	Yes	Yes	Yes	Yes	9
Cal State Northridge	Yes	Yes	Yes	Yes	Yes	Yes	Yes	Yes	Yes	Yes	10
Long Beach State	Yes	Yes	Yes	Yes	Yes	Yes	Yes	Yes	Yes	Yes	10
Sacramento State	Yes	Yes	Yes	Yes	Yes	Yes	Yes	Yes	Yes	No	9
UC Irvine	Yes	No	Yes	Yes	Yes	No	Yes	Yes	Yes	Yes	8
UC Riverside	Yes	No	Yes	Yes	Yes	Yes	Yes	Yes	Yes	No	8
UC San Diego	Yes	No	Yes	No	Yes	Yes	Yes	Yes	Yes	Yes	8
UC Santa Barbara	Yes	No	Yes	No	Yes	Yes	Yes	Yes	Yes	Yes	8
Utah Valley	Yes	No	Yes	Yes	Yes	Yes	No	Yes	Yes	No	7
Totals	12	5+1 (Note: Affiliate member Hawaii.)	12	10	12	11	9	12	12	7+1	104+2

Women's varsity sports not sponsored by the Big West Conference which are played by Big West schools
School	Fencing	Gymnastics	Rowing	Stunt (Note: Elevated from the NCAA Emerging Sports for Women program to full championship status in January 2026, with the first official NCAA championship in 2026–27.)	Swimming and Diving	Track & Field (Indoor)
Bakersfield	No	No	No	No	MPSF	Independent
California Baptist	No	No	No	MPSF	Pac-12	No
Cal Poly	No	No	No	MPSF	No	Independent
Cal State Fullerton	No	No	No	No	No	MPSF
Cal State Northridge	No	No	No	No	No	MPSF
Long Beach State	No	No	No	No	No	MPSF
Sacramento State	No	MPSF	MAC	No	No	MPSF
UC Irvine	No	No	No	No	No	MPSF
UC San Diego	MPSF	No	WCC	No	MPSF	No
UC Santa Barbara	No	No	No	No	MPSF	MPSF
Utah Valley	No	No	No	No	No	MPSF

=== Current conference champions ===
The Big West Conference sponsors championship competition in 9 men's and 10 women's NCAA sanctioned sports. Men's and women's swimming & diving were added in 2024–25.

Regular-season champions are indicated with "(RS)" and tournament champions with "(T)".

Season	Sport	Men's champion	Women's champion
Fall 2026	Cross country	Cal Baptist	Utah Valley
Fall 2026	Soccer	Utah Valley (RS); Cal State Bakersfield (T)	Utah Valley (RS); TBD (T)
Fall 2026	Water polo	Cal Baptist (RS)	—N/a
Fall 2026	Volleyball	—N/a	
Winter 2026–27	Basketball		
Spring 2027	Golf		
Spring 2027	Volleyball		—N/a
Spring 2027	Beach volleyball	—N/a	
Spring 2027	Tennis		
Spring 2027	Water polo	—N/a	
Spring 2027	Track & field (outdoor)		
Spring 2027	Softball	—N/a	
Spring 2027	Baseball		—N/a

=== Former sports ===
==== Football ====
An asterisk denotes the participant in the bowls that invited the Big West champion:
Pasadena (1969–70), California (1981–91), Las Vegas (1992–96), and Humanitarian (1997–2000)

Football Champions (1969–1984)
Year	University
1969	San Diego State*
1970	Long Beach State* & San Diego State
1971	Long Beach State
1972	San Diego State
1973	San Diego State
1974	San Diego State
1975	San Jose State
1976	San Jose State
1977	Fresno State
1978	San Jose State and Utah State
1979	Utah State
1980	Long Beach State
1981	San Jose State*
1982	Fresno State*
1983	Cal State Fullerton*
1984	Cal State Fullerton (UNLV* forfeited)

Football Champions (1985–2000)
Year	University
1985	Fresno State*
1986	San Jose State*
1987	San Jose State*
1988	Fresno State*
1989	Fresno State*
1990	San Jose State*
1991	Fresno State* & San Jose State
1992	Nevada*
1993	Utah State* & Southwestern La.
1994	UNLV*, Southwestern La., & Nevada
1995	Nevada*
1996	Nevada* & Utah State
1997	Utah State* & Nevada
1998	Idaho*
1999	Boise State*
2000	Boise State*

The Big West Conference discontinued football following the 2000 season.

== Academics ==
The following table shows National University rank by U.S. News & World Report as of 2026, as well as the Regional Western University rank as denoted by an asterisk, and the Forbes ranking for 2024-25.

Also indicated is membership in the Association of American Universities.

Institution	US News & World Report	Forbes	AAU Member
UC San Diego	29	20	Yes
UC Irvine	32	31	Yes
UC Santa Barbara	40	42	Yes
UC Riverside	75	77	Yes
Long Beach State	127	97	No
Cal State Fullerton	139	118	No
Cal Poly	1*	55	No
Cal State Northridge	20*	271	No
Sacramento State	22*	280	No
Cal State Bakersfield	31*	295	No
Cal Baptist	33*	–	No
Utah Valley	93*	–	No

== Athletic department revenue by school ==
Total revenue includes ticket sales, contributions and donations, rights and licensing, student fees, school funds and all other sources including TV income, camp income, concessions, and novelties.

Total expenses includes coach and staff salaries, scholarships, buildings and grounds, maintenance, utilities and rental fees, recruiting, team travel, equipment and uniforms, conference dues, and insurance.

The following table shows institutional reporting to the United States Department of Education as shown on the DOE Equity in Athletics website for the 2024–25 academic year.

Institution	2023-24 Total Expenses on Athletics	2023-24 Total Revenue from Athletics
Sacramento State	$46,274,655	
Cal Poly	$45,535,245	$49,208,831
California Baptist	$37,832,623	$41,582,676
UC San Diego	$36,538,768	
UC Santa Barbara	$32,803,613	
UC Irvine	$30,301,851	
Long Beach State	$27,320,150	$28,274,188
CSU Fullerton	$26,422,865	
CSU Northridge	$23,262,522	$23,671,740
UC Riverside	$19,725,015	
Utah Valley	$19,556,182	
CSU Bakersfield	$18,028,334	

The following table shows revenue specifically from NCAA / Conference Distributions, Media Rights, and Post-Season Football reported by the Knight Commission for the 2023-24 academic year.

Institution	2023–24 distribution (millions of dollars)
California Polytechnic State University	$1.91
University of California, Santa Barbara	$1.83
California State University, Sacramento	$1.41
University of California, Irvine	$1.35
California State University, Long Beach	$1.34
University of California, Riverside	$1.22
Utah Valley University	$1.14
California State University, Fullerton	$1.06
California State University, Bakersfield	$0.79
California State University, Northridge	$0.68
University of California, San Diego	$0.46
California Baptist University (Note: California Baptist University is a private university, and is therefore not required to submit data to the Knight Commission. Thus, information regarding revenue and expenses on athletics is received from the United States Department of Education as shown on the DOE Equity in Athletics website for the 2024-25 school year. No data is able to be acquired regarding NCAA/Conference Distributions, Media Rights, and Post-Season Football.)	N/A

== Facilities ==
School	Basketball arena	Capacity	Baseball stadium	Capacity	Soccer stadium	Capacity	Softball stadium	Capacity
Cal State Bakersfield	Icardo Center	3,800	Hardt Field	900	Main Soccer Field	2,500	Roadrunner Softball Complex	955
California Baptist	Fowler Events Center	5,050	James W. Totman Stadium	800	CBU Soccer Stadium	500	John C. Funk Stadium	500
Cal Poly	Mott Athletics Center	3,032	Robin Baggett Stadium	3,138	Mustang Memorial Field	11,075	Bob Janssen Field	800
Cal State Fullerton	Titan Gym	4,000	Goodwin Field	3,500	Titan Stadium	10,000	Anderson Family Field	1,000
Cal State Northridge	Premier America Credit Union Arena	2,400	Matador Field	1,000	Matador Soccer Field	1,550	Matador Diamond	500
Long Beach State	Walter Pyramid	5,000	Blair Field	3,238	George Allen Field	1,000	Long Beach State Softball Complex	500
Sacramento State	Hornet Pavilion	3,000	John Smith Field	1,200	Hornet Soccer Field	1,500	Shea Stadium	912
UC Irvine	Bren Events Center	5,000	Cicerone Field	3,408	Anteater Stadium	2,500	Non-softball member	
UC Riverside	SRC Arena	3,168	Riverside Sports Complex	2,500	UCR Soccer Stadium	900	Amy S. Harrison Softball Field	600
UC San Diego	LionTree Arena	4,200	Triton Ballpark	1,200	Triton Soccer Stadium	1,750	Triton Softball Field	750
UC Santa Barbara	The Thunderdome	5,600	Caesar Uyesaka Stadium	1,000	Harder Stadium	17,000	Campus Diamond	N/A
Utah Valley	UCCU Center	8,500	UCCU Ballpark	5,000	UCCU Stadium	3,000	Wolverine Field	575

== NCAA team championships ==
Through June 30, 2025

School	Total NCAA	NCAA Men's	NCAA Women's	NCAA Individual	Nickname
California Baptist University	0	0	0	0	Lancers
California Polytechnic State University	12	0	0	12	Mustangs
California State University, Bakersfield	9	0	0	9	Roadrunners
California State University, Fullerton	8	4	1	3	Titans
California State University, Long Beach	23	4	3	16	Beach
California State University, Northridge	6	0	0	6	Matadors
California State University, Sacramento	3	0	0	3	Hornets
University of California, Irvine	10	7	0	3	Anteaters
University of California, Riverside	1	0	0	1	Highlanders
University of California, San Diego	0	0	0	0	Tritons
University of California, Santa Barbara	3	2	0	1	Gauchos
Utah Valley University	1	0	0	1	Wolverines

== Commissioner's Cup ==
Starting during the Big West Conference's 1998–99 season, the Commissioner's Cup is awarded yearly to the most outstanding program throughout the season in the conference's sponsored sports.

Year	Institution	Championships competed	Total points	Average	Title #
1998–99	Pacific Tigers	12	620	51.7	1
1999–00	Pacific Tigers	12	600	50.0	2
2000–01	UC Santa Barbara Gauchos	16	870	54.4	1
2001–02	UC Santa Barbara Gauchos	16	2,020	126.3	2
2002–03	UC Santa Barbara Gauchos	16	2,070	129.4	3
2003–04	UC Santa Barbara Gauchos	16	2,210	138.1	4
2004–05	UC Santa Barbara Gauchos	16	2,180	136.3	5
2005–06	Long Beach State 49ers	13	1,640	126.2	1
2006–07	UC Santa Barbara Gauchos	16	1,800	112.5	6
2007–08	UC Santa Barbara Gauchos	16	2,046	127.9	7
2008–09	Long Beach State 49ers	14	1,540	110.0	2
2009–10	UC Santa Barbara Gauchos	17	1,970	115.9	8
2010–11	Long Beach State 49ers	14	1,830	130.7	3
2011–12	Long Beach State 49ers	14	1,960	140.0	4
2012–13	Long Beach State 49ers	14	1,950	139.3	5
2013–14	Long Beach State 49ers	14	1,740	124.3	6
2014–15	Long Beach State 49ers	14	1,640	117.1	7
2015–16	UC Santa Barbara Gauchos	15	2,006.7	133.8	9
2016–17	Long Beach State 49ers	15	1,750	116.7	8
2017–18	Cal State Fullerton Titans	14	1,635	116.8	1
2018–19	UC Santa Barbara Gauchos	16	1,930	120.6	10
2019–20	Not awarded due to the COVID-19 pandemic.				
2020–21	Not awarded due to the COVID-19 pandemic.				
2021–22	Long Beach State Beach	16	2,260	141.3	9
2022–23	Long Beach State Beach	16	2,360	147.5	10
2023–24	Cal Poly Mustangs	16	2,390	149.4	1
2024–25	UC Irvine Anteaters	17	2,530	148.8	1
2025–26	Cal Poly Mustangs	16	2,613	163.3	2

=== Overall Commissioner's Cups Table ===
Institution	Commissioner's Cups
**Long Beach State 49ers/Beach**	10
**UC Santa Barbara Gauchos**	10
**Cal Poly Mustangs**	2
Pacific Tigers	2
**Cal State Fullerton Titans**	1
**UC Irvine Anteaters**	1

Note 1: Bold indicates current members of the Big West Conference
Note 2: The Pacific Tigers moved to the West Coast Conference in 2013

== SoCal Challenge ==
Starting in 2021, the Big West Conference served as host of the SoCal Challenge, an eight-team men's basketball tournament held during Monday and Wednesday of Thanksgiving week. One Big West team represented the conference in the field of each tournament. Cal Poly, Cal State Northridge and Cal State Bakersfield participated in 2021, 2022 and 2023, respectively. The final tournament was held in 2023.

== See also ==
- Big West Conference men's basketball tournament
- Big West Conference women's basketball tournament
- List of Big West Conference baseball champions
- Big West Conference men's soccer tournament
- Big West Conference women's soccer tournament
- Big West Conference women's volleyball
