= Volleyball at the 1988 Summer Olympics – Women's team rosters =

List of volleyball players

The following teams and players took part in the women's volleyball tournament at the 1988 Summer Olympics, in Seoul.

== Group A ==
=== East Germany ===
- Steffi Schmidt
- Susanne Lahme
- Monika Beu
- Ariane Radfan
- Kathrin Langschwager
- Maike Arlt
- Brit Wiedemann
- Ute Steppin
- Grit Jensen
- Dörte Stüdemann
- Heike Jensen
- Ute Langenau

Head coach

- Siegfried Köhler

=== Japan ===
- Yumi Maruyama
- Kayoko Sugiyama
- Reiko Takizawa
- Miyako Yamashita
- Akemi Sugiyama
- Ichiko Sato
- Norie Hiro
- Kumi Nakada
- Yukari Kawase
- Motoko Obayashi
- Yukiko Takahashi
- Sachiko Fujita

Head coach

- Noriyuki Muneuchi

=== South Korea ===
- Park Mi-Hee
- Kim Gyeong-hui
- Kim Gwi-sun
- Im Hye-suk
- Yu Yeong-mi
- Nam Sun-ok
- Yun Jeong-hye
- Park Bog-ye
- Kim Yun-hye
- Sun Mi-sook
- Mun Seon-hui
- Ji Gyeong-hui

Head coach

- Hwang Sung-On

=== Soviet Union ===
- Valentina Ogiyenko
- Yelena Volkova
- Marina Kumysh
- Irina Smirnova
- Tatyana Sidorenko
- Irina Parkhomchuk
- Tatyana Kraynova
- Olga Shkurnova
- Marina Nikulina
- Yelena Ovchinnikova
- Olga Krivosheyeva
- Svetlana Korytova

Head coach

- Nikolay Karpol

== Group B ==
=== Brazil ===
- Kerly Santos
- Ana Moser
- Vera Mossa
- Eliani da Costa
- Ana Richa
- Maria Trade
- Ana Cláudia Ramos
- Márcia Cunha
- Ana Lúcia Barros
- Sandra Suruagy
- Fernanda Venturini
- Simone Storm

Head coach

- Jorge Araújo

=== China ===
- Li Guojun
- Zhou Hong
- Hou Yuzhu
- Wang Yajun
- Yang Xilan
- Su Huijuan
- Jiang Ying
- Cui Yongmei
- Yang Xiaojun
- Zheng Meizhu
- Wu Dan
- Li Yueming

Head coach

- Li Yaoxian

=== Peru ===
- Katherine Horny
- Cenaida Uribe
- Rosa García
- Miriam Gallardo
- Gaby Pérez
- Sonia Heredia
- Cecilia Tait
- Luisa Cervera
- Denisse Fajardo
- Alejandra de la Guerra
- Gina Torrealva
- Natalia Málaga

Head coach

- Park Man-Bok

=== United States ===
- Melissa McLinden
- Angela Rock
- Liz Masakayan
- Kim Oden
- Kimberly Ruddins
- Caren Kemner
- Tammy Webb
- Deitre Collins
- Laurel Kessel
- Prikeba Phipps
- Liane Sato
- Jayne McHugh

Head coach

- Terry Liskevych
