= Volleyball at the 1992 Summer Olympics – Women's tournament =

Women's volleyball at the Games of the XXV Olympiad
- Venue: Palau d'Esports; Pavelló de la Vall d'Hebron; Palau Sant Jordi
- Date: 29 July – 8 August
- Competitors: 96 from 8 nations

Medalists
1st place, gold medalist(s)		Cuba (1st title)
2nd place, silver medalist(s)		Unified Team
3rd place, bronze medalist(s)		United States

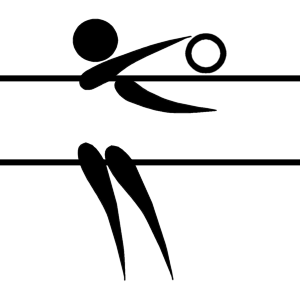

The 1992 women's Olympic volleyball tournament was the eighth edition of the event, organised by the world's governing body, the FIVB in conjunction with the International Olympic Committee. The competition in Barcelona, Spain was held from 29 July to 8 August 1992 in three venues in the city: the Palau d'Esports, the Pavelló de la Vall d'Hebron and the Palau Sant Jordi, where the semi-finals and finals were played.

== Qualification ==
Qualifiers	Date	Host	Vacancies	Qualified
Host country	17 October 1986	(Switzerland) Lausanne	1	Spain
1988 Summer Olympics	20–29 September 1988	(South Korea) Seoul	1	Soviet Union
1990 World Championship	22–31 August 1990	(China) Beijing	1	China*
1991 Asian Championship	14–21 September 1991	(Thailand) Bangkok	1	Japan*
1991 NORCECA Championship	23 August - 2 September 1991	(Canada) Regina	1	Cuba
1991 South American Championship	September 1991	(Brazil) Osasco	1	Brazil
1991 European Championship	28 Sep – 6 Oct 1991	(Italy) Rome	1	Netherlands*
1991 World Cup	8–17 November 1991	(Japan) Osaka	1	United States*
Total			8	

* Notes:

1. China was the 1990 World Championship runners-up (champions Soviet Union, were already qualified as 1988 Olympic champions).
2. Japan was the 1991 Asian Championship runners-up (champions China, were already qualified as 1990 World Championship runners-up).
3. The Netherlands was the 1991 European Championship runners-up (champions Soviet Union, were already qualified as 1988 Olympic champions).
4. The United States was fourth at the 1991 World Cup (champions Cuba, runners-up China and third place Soviet Union were already qualified through other tournaments).

With the dissolution of the Soviet Union in December 1991, most of its now independent Republics formed the Commonwealth of Independent States (CIS) and competed together as the Unified Team.

== Format ==
Compared to four years earlier, the format of the tournament underwent some changes.The tournament was played in two different stages. In the Preliminary round (first stage), the eight participants were divided into two pools of four teams in a single round-robin format was played within each pool to determine the teams position. At the Final round (second stage) the first placed teams in each group qualified directly for the semi-finals, while the second and third placed teams in the Olympic crossover system would face each other in an extra round consisting of a single elimination round with the winners advancing to the semi-finals and those eliminated playing a game to define fifth place. The winners of these two games faced those already qualified for the semifinals and while the winners played in the final, the losers played in the bronze medal match.

== Pools composition ==
Pool A	Pool B
Spain	Cuba
Unified Team	China
United States	Brazil
Japan	Netherlands

== Venues ==
- Palau d'Esports, Barcelona, Spain
- Pavelló de la Vall d'Hebron, Barcelona, Spain
- Palau Sant Jordi, Barcelona, Spain

== Preliminary round ==
=== Group A ===
Pos	Team	Pld	W	L	Pts	SW	SL	SR	SPW	SPL	SPR	Qualification
1	Unified Team	3	2	1	5	8	3	2.667	158	101	1.564	Semifinals
2	United States	3	2	1	5	8	5	1.600	171	153	1.118	Quarterfinals
3	Japan	3	2	1	5	6	5	1.200	146	127	1.150	Quarterfinals
4	Spain	3	0	3	3	0	9	0.000	41	135	0.304	7th place match

29 July 1992	Unified Team	3–0	Spain
29 July 1992	(15–3, 15–0, 15–3); Report

29 July 1992	United States	2–3	Japan
29 July 1992	(15–13, 11–15, 12–15, 15–8, 13–15); Report

31 July 1992	United States	3–2	Unified Team
31 July 1992	(9–15, 17–15, 15–12, 4–15, 15–11); Report

31 July 1992	Japan	3–0	Spain
31 July 1992	(15–9, 15–1, 15–6); Report

2 August 1992	Unified Team	3–0	Japan
2 August 1992	(15–13, 15–11, 15–11); Report

2 August 1992	Spain	0–3	United States
2 August 1992	(4–15, 5–15, 10–15); Report

=== Group B ===
Pos	Team	Pld	W	L	Pts	SW	SL	SR	SPW	SPL	SPR	Qualification
1	Cuba	3	3	0	6	9	2	4.500	151	129	1.171	Semifinals
2	Brazil	3	2	1	5	7	6	1.167	170	145	1.172	Quarterfinals
3	Netherlands	3	1	2	4	4	8	0.500	136	166	0.819	Quarterfinals
4	China	3	0	3	3	5	9	0.556	174	191	0.911	7th place match

29 July 1992	Netherlands	1–3	Brazil
29 July 1992	(9–15, 3–15, 15–11, 7–15); Report

29 July 1992	China	1–3	Cuba
29 July 1992	(15–13, 11–15, 9–15, 11–15); Report

31 July 1992	Netherlands	3–2	China
31 July 1992	(6–15, 15–17, 15–13, 16–14, 15–6); Report

31 July 1992	Brazil	1–3	Cuba
31 July 1992	(11–15, 15–3, 13–15, 9–15); Report

2 August 1992	Cuba	3–0	Netherlands
2 August 1992	(15–11, 15–11, 15–13); Report

2 August 1992	China	2–3	Brazil
2 August 1992	(9–15, 15–7, 11–15, 16–14, 12–15); Report

== Final round ==
=== 7th to 8th place ===
7th place match
A4	Spain	0
B4	China	3

==== 7th place match ====
Date		Score		Set 1	Set 2	Set 3	Set 4	Set 5	Total	Report
5 Aug	Spain	0–3	China	1–15	3–15	3–15			7–45	Report

=== Final ===
First round
4 August
A3	Japan	1
B2	Brazil	3
4 August
A2	United States	3
B3	Netherlands	1

Semifinals
6 August
A1	Unified Team	3
B2	Brazil	1
6 August
A2	United States	2
B1	Cuba	3
Fifth place
5 August
Netherlands	1
Japan	3

Final
8 August
Unified Team	1
Cuba	3
Third place
8 August
Brazil	0
United States	3

==== Quarterfinals ====
4 August 1992	United States	3–1	Netherlands
4 August 1992	(15–11, 11–15, 15–8, 15–7); Report

4 August 1992	Japan	1–3	Brazil
4 August 1992	(16–14, 13–15, 13–15, 9–15); Report

==== 5th place match ====
5 August 1992	Netherlands	1–3	Japan
5 August 1992	(0–15, 15–11, 13–15, 10–15); Report

==== Semifinals ====
6 August 1992	United States	2–3	Cuba
6 August 1992	(15–8, 9–15, 15–6, 5–15, 11–15); Report

6 August 1992	Unified Team	3–1	Brazil
6 August 1992	(15–10, 13–15, 15–5, 15–5); Report

==== Bronze medal match ====
8 August 1992	Brazil	0–3	United States
8 August 1992	(8–15, 6–15, 13–15); Report

==== Gold medal match ====
8 August 1992	Unified Team	1–3	Cuba
8 August 1992	(14–16 ,15–12, 12–15 ,13–15); Report

== Final standings ==
Place	Team
1st place, gold medalist(s)	Cuba
2nd place, silver medalist(s)	Unified Team
3rd place, bronze medalist(s)	United States
4	Brazil
5	Japan
6	Netherlands
7	China
8	Spain

1992 Women's Olympic champions

Cuba
1st title

12-woman roster
Tania Ortiz, Marlenys Costa, Mireya Luis (c), Lilia Izquierdo, Idalmis Gato, Raisa O'Farril, Regla Bell, Regla Torres, Norka Latamblet, Mercedes Calderón, Ana Fernández, Magalys Carvajal
Head coach
Eugenio George

== Medalists ==
Gold	Silver	Bronze
Cuba Tania Ortiz; Marlenys Costa; Mireya Luis (c); Lilia Izquierdo; Idalmis Gato; Raisa O'Farril; Regla Bell; Regla Torres; Norka Latamblet; Mercedes Calderón; Ana Fernández; Magalys Carvajal Head coach: Eugenio George	Unified Team Valentina Ogienko; Natalya Morozova; Marina Nikulina; Batukhtina; Irina Smirnova; Tatyana Sidorenko; Tatyana Menchova; Yevgeniya Artamonova; Galina Lebedeva; Svetlana Vasilevskaya; Elena Chebukina; Svetlana Korytova Head coach: Nikolay Karpol	United States Tonya Sanders; Yoko Zetterlund; Kim Oden; Lori Endicott; Paula Weishoff; Caren Kemner; Tammy Webb-Liley; Elaina Oden; Janet Cobbs; Tara Cross-Battle; Liane Sato; Ruth Lawanson Head coach: Terry Liskevych

== Awards ==
- Most valuable player
  Paula Weishoff (USA)
- Best setter
  Lori Endicott (USA)
- Best scorer
  Caren Kemner (USA)
- Best spiker
  Irina Smirnova (EUN)
- Best blocker
  Magaly Carvajal (CUB)
- Best receiver
  Cintha Boersma (NED)
- Best digger
  Itoko Sato (JPN)
- Best server
  Ana Moser (BRA)

== Statistics leaders ==
Best scorers

Rank	Name	Total Points	Spike	Block	Serve
1	(United States) Kemner, Caren	117	102	10	65
2	(Brazil) Moser, Ana	107	89	4	14
3	(Japan) Obayashi, Motoko	103	86	11	6
4	(Cuba) Luis, Mireya	102	83	5	14
5	(Netherlands) Boersma, Cintha	100	94	6	2
6	(United States) Weishoff, Paula	96	88	4	4
7	(Cuba) Carvajal, Magalys	95	73	19	3
8	(Unified Team at the Olympics) Smirnova, Irina	92	83	5	4
9	(Unified Team at the Olympics) Oguienko, Valentina	90	72	16	2
10	(Brazil) Caldeira, Hilma	80	74	4	2

Best attackers

Rank	Name	Total kills	Efficiency%
1	(Unified Team at the Olympics) Smirnova, Irina	83	43.16
2	(Cuba) Luis, Mireya	83	42.88
3	(Brazil) Moser, Ana	89	39.97
4	(United States) Weishoff, Paula	88	35.62
5	(China) Sun Yue	61	34.26

Best blockers

Rank	Name	Total blocks	Avg by set
1	(Cuba) Carvajal, Magalys	19	2.76
2	(Unified Team at the Olympics) Oguienko, Valentina	16	1.54
3	(Unified Team at the Olympics) Cebukina, Elena	15	1.32
4	(United States) Oden, Kimberly	13	1.03
5	(China) Calderon, Mercedes	13	0.98

Best servers

Rank	Name	Total aces	Avg by set
1	(Brazil) Moser, Ana	14	0.68
2	(Cuba) Luis, Mireya	14	0.59
3	(Cuba) Bell, Regla	12	0.51
4	(United States) Weersing, Henriette	11	0.48
5	(Unified Team at the Olympics) Batukhtina, Elena	9	0.42

Best diggers

Rank	Name	Total digs	Avg by set
1	(Japan) Sato, Itoko	43	2.12
2	(Cuba) Luis, Mireya	40	2.03
3	(Cuba) Lai Yawen	38	2.00
4	(Unified Team at the Olympics) Batuktina, Elena	32	1.83
5	(Japan) Obayasahi, Motoko	30	1.76

Best setters

Rank	Name	Excellent	Avg by set
1	(United States) Endicott, Lori	183	9.15
2	(Brazil) Venturini, Fernanda	184	8.95
3	(China) Su Huijuan	144	7.13
4	(Unified Team at the Olympics) Nikulina, Marina	118	6.10
5	(Cuba) Izquierdo, Lilia	103	5.34
6	(Japan) Nakanishi, Chieko	101	5.02
7	(Netherlands) Crielaard, Heleen	97	4.16
8	(Cuba) Costa, Marleny	84	3.32

Best receivers

Rank	Name	Excellent%
1	(Netherlands) Boersma, Cintha	81.23
2	(China) Lai Yawen	77.45
3	(Japan) Sato, Itoko	75.45
4	(Unified Team at the Olympics) Batukhtina, Elena	74.19
5	(Japan) Tajimi, Asako	72.21

== Dream Team ==
- SETTER
  Lori Endicott (USA)
- Outside Hitters
  Mireya Luis (CUB)
  Irina Smirnova (EUN)
- MIDDLE BLOCKERS
  Magalys Carvajal (CUB)
  Kimberly Oden (USA)
- OPPOSITE SPIKER
  Paula Weishoff (USA)

== See also ==
- Volleyball at the 1992 Summer Olympics – Men's tournament
- Volleyball at the 1992 Summer Olympics
