= 1990 FIVB Women's Volleyball World Championship squads =

This article shows the participating team squads at the 1990 FIVB Women's World Championship, held from 22 August to 1 September in China.

== Soviet Union (1st) ==
Coach: Nikolay Karpol

No.	Name	Age	Height	Weight
1	Valentina Ogiyenko	25	182 cm (6 ft 0 in)	74 kg (163 lb)
3	Marina Nikulina	27	180 cm (5 ft 11 in)	
4	Elena Batukhtina	19	184 cm (6 ft 0 in)	
5	Irina Smirnova	22	186 cm (6 ft 1 in)	74 kg (163 lb)
6	Tatyana Sidorenko	24	185 cm (6 ft 1 in)	80 kg (180 lb)
7	Irina Parchomtschuk	25	178 cm (5 ft 10 in)	
10	Svetlana Vasilevskaya	19		
11	Elena Chebukina	25	188 cm (6 ft 2 in)	
12	Irina Gorbatiuk	27		
13	Svetlana Korytova	22	185 cm (6 ft 1 in)	
14	Yuliya Bubnova	19	185 cm (6 ft 1 in)	
15	Olga Tolmachyova	27	180 cm (5 ft 11 in)	

== China (2nd) ==
Coach: Hu Jin

No.	Name	Age	Height	Weight
1	Lang Ping	30	185 cm (6 ft 1 in)	73 kg (161 lb)
2	Qi Lili	19	181 cm (5 ft 11 in)	
3	He Yunshu			
4	Lai Yawen	20	187 cm (6 ft 2 in)	74 kg (163 lb)
5	Li Guojun	24	181 cm (5 ft 11 in)	84 kg (185 lb)
6	Su Liqun	17	177 cm	74 kg
7	Li Yueming	22	188 cm (6 ft 2 in)	75 kg (165 lb)
8	Xu Xin	22	174 cm (5 ft 9 in)	65 kg (143 lb)
9	Wu Dan	22		
10	Mao Wuyang	23	182 cm (6 ft 0 in)	66 kg (146 lb)
11	Su Huijuan (c)	26	179 cm (5 ft 10 in)	72 kg (159 lb)
15	Zhou Hong	24		

== United States (3rd) ==
Coach: Taras Liskevych

No.	Name	Age	Height	Weight
1	Teee Sanders	22		
3	Liz Masakayan	25		
4	Kimberly Oden	26		
5	Lori Endicott	23		
7	Caren Kemner	25	185 cm (6 ft 1 in)	80 kg (180 lb)
8	Tammy Liley	25	180 cm (5 ft 11 in)	68 kg (150 lb)
9	Elaina Oden	23		
13	Tara Cross-Battle	22		
14	Liane Sato	26		
15	Ruth Lawanson	27	173 cm (5 ft 8 in)	75 kg (165 lb)

== Cuba (4th) ==
Head coach: Eugenio George Lafita

No.	Name	Age	Height	Weight
1	Tania Ortiz	24	180 cm (5 ft 11 in)	
2	Imilsis Téllez	31	179 cm (5 ft 10 in)	
3	Mireya Luis Hernandez	22	175 cm (5 ft 9 in)	
4	Lilia Izquierdo Aguirre	23	173 cm (5 ft 8 in)	
8	Regla Bell	20	180 cm (5 ft 11 in)	73 kg
10	Lazara González	25	178 cm (5 ft 10 in)	
12	Norka Latamblet	28	184 cm (6 ft 0 in)	
13	Mercedes Calderón	24	186 cm (6 ft 1 in)	
15	Magaly Carvajal	22	190 cm (6 ft 3 in)	

== South Korea (5th) ==
Head coach: Lee Chang-ho

No.	Name	Date of birth	Height	1990 club	position
	Park Mi-hee 박미희	12.10.63	174 cm (5 ft 8 1/2 in)	Dae-sung	Center, Opposite
	Kim Kyung-hee 김경희	1967	170 cm (5 ft 7 in)	hyo-sung	Setter
	Ji Kyung-hee 지경희	1968	178 cm (5 ft 10 in)	Hyundai-construction	Outside hitter
	Chang Yoon-hee 장윤희	1970	170 cm (5 ft 7 in)	Ho.Nam Oil	Outside hitter
	Nam Soon-ok 남순옥		181 cm (5 ft 11 1/2 in)	Tae-gwang	Center
	Kim Gwi-soon 김귀순		176 cm (5 ft 9 1/2 in)	Han-il Synthetics Ltd	Center
	Kang Joo-hee 강주희	05.25.71	186 cm (6 ft 1 in)	Hyo-sung	Center

== Peru (6th) ==
No.	Name	Age	Height	Weight
1	Sonia Ayaucán	21	176 cm (5 ft 9 in)	63 kg (139 lb)
2	Cenaida Uribe Medina	25	174 cm (5 ft 9 in)	65 kg (143 lb)
3	Rosa Garcia	26	175 cm (5 ft 9 in)	65 kg (143 lb)
4	Miriam Gallardo	22	180 cm (5 ft 11 in)	57 kg (126 lb)
5	Gabriela Perez del Solar	22	194 cm (6 ft 4 in)	72 kg (159 lb)
6	Jessica Tejada	19	173 cm (5 ft 8 in)	63 kg (139 lb)
7	Milagros Cámere	17	178 cm (5 ft 10 in)	63 kg (139 lb)
8	Yolanda Delgado	20	175 cm (5 ft 9 in)	70 kg (150 lb)
9	Sammy Duarte	20	192 cm (6 ft 4 in)	
10	Paola Paz Soldan	20	181 cm (5 ft 11 in)	
11	Janet Vasconzuelos	21	168 cm (5 ft 6 in)	61 kg (134 lb)
12	Natalia Malaga Dibos	26	170 cm (5 ft 7 in)	60 kg (130 lb)

== Brazil (7th) ==
Coach: Inaldo Manta

No.	Name	Age	Height	Weight
	Kerly Santos	20	1.89 m	
2	Ana Moser	22	1.85 m (6 ft 1 in)	70 kg (150 lb)
	Ana Ida Alvares	25	1.78 m	
	Ana Richa	23		
11	Marcia Cunha	21	1.85 m	
	Fernanda Venturini	19	1.81 m	
13	Ana Flávia Sanglard	20	1.87 cm (6 ft 2 in)	
	Cristina Lopes	24	1.77 m	
	Ana Volponi			
	Fatima Santos			
	Denise Souza			
	Cilene Drewnick	23	1.83 m	

== Japan (8th) ==
No.	Name	Age	Height	Weight
1	Ichiko Sato	25		
2	Naomi Masuko			
3	Shiho Kaneko			
4	Motoko Obayashi	23		
5	Akiko Suzuki			
6	Chie Natori	21		
7	Kiyomi Sakamoto	21		
8	Kazuyo Matsukawa			
9	Tomoko Yoshihara	20		
10	Kiyoko Fukuda	20		
11	Mayumi Saito			
12	Kumiko Sakamoto			

== Netherlands (9th) ==
No.	Name	Age	Height	Weight
	Saskia van Hintum	20		
	Henriette Weersing	24		
	Ingrid Piersma			
	Cintha Boersma	21		
	Femke Hoekstra			
	Marjolein de Jong	22		

== Italy (10th) ==
No.	Name	Age	Height	Weight
	Manuela Benelli			
	Liliana Bernardi			
	Sabrina Bertini	20	182 cm (6 ft 0 in)	75 kg (165 lb)
	Helga Chiostrini			
	Cinzia Flamigni			
	Consuelo Mangifesta			
	Mirna Marabissi			
	Fabiana Mele			
	Fanny Pudioli			
	Daniela Saporiti			
	Sabina Turrini	18	185 cm (6 ft 1 in)	
	Alessandra Zambelli	23	179 cm (5 ft 10 in)	

== West Germany (13th) ==
No.	Name	Age	Height	Weight
6	Nancy Celis	23	188 cm (6 ft 2 in)	
10	Susanne Schiarmann			
