= Volleyball at the 1988 Summer Olympics – Women's tournament =

Women's volleyball at the Games of the XXIV Olympiad
- Venue: Jamsil Gymnasium; Saemaul Sports Hall; Hanyang University Gymnasium
- Date: 20–29 September
- Competitors: 96 from 8 nations

Medalists
1st place, gold medalist(s)		Soviet Union (4th title)
2nd place, silver medalist(s)		Peru
3rd place, bronze medalist(s)		China

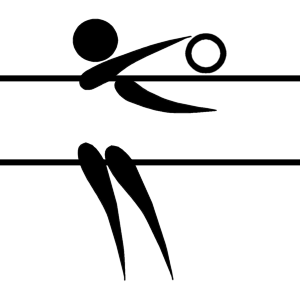

The 1988 women's Olympic volleyball tournament was the seventh edition of the event, organised by the world's governing body, the FIVB in conjunction with the International Olympic Committee. The competition in Seoul, South Korea was held from 20 to 29 September 1988.

== Qualification ==
Qualifiers	Date	Host	Vacancies	Qualified
Host country	30 September 1981	(West Germany) Baden-Baden	1	South Korea
1984 Olympic Games	30 Jul – 7 Aug 1984	(United States) Los Angeles	1	China
1986 World Championship	2–13 September 1986	(Czechoslovakia) Prague	~~1~~	~~Cuba~~ Peru
1987 Asian Championsnip	6–14 June 1987	(China) Shanghai	1	Japan*
1987 NORCECA Championship	12-19 June 1987	(Cuba) Havana	1	United States*
1987 South American Championship	20-29 September 1987	(Uruguay) Punta del Este	1	Brazil
1987 European Championship	25 Sep – 3 Oct 1987	(Belgium) Auderghem	1	East Germany
1988 Olympic qualification tournament		Italy	1	Soviet Union
Total			8	

* Notes:

1. Cuba was the 1986 World Championship runners-up (champions China had already qualified as 1984 Olympic champions), but together with 6 another countries, boycotted the games and their spot was given to Peru, as the team finished in the 3rd place at the 1986 FIVB Volleyball Women's World Championship.
2. Peru won the 1987 Women's South American Volleyball Championship, but as they had already qualified, the South American place was reassigned to Brazil.
3. Japan was the 1987 Asian Championship runners-up (champions China had already qualified as 1984 Olympic champions).
4. United States was the 1987 NORCECA Championship runners-up (champions Cuba had already qualified as 1986 World Championship runners-up).

== Format ==
The tournament was played in two different stages. In the Preliminary round (first stage), the eight participants were divided into two pools of four teams. A single round-robin format was played within each pool to determine the teams position in the pool. The Final round (second stage) was played in a single elimination format, where the preliminary round two highest ranked teams in each group advanced to the semifinals and the two lowest ranked teams advanced to the 5th–8th place semifinals.

== Pools composition ==
Pool A	Pool B
South Korea	China
Soviet Union	United States
Japan	Brazil
East Germany	Peru

== Venues ==
- Jamsil Gymnasium, Seoul, South Korea
- Saemaul Sports Hall, Seoul, South Korea
- Hanyang University Gymnasium, Seoul, South Korea

== Preliminary round ==
=== Group A ===
Pos	Team	Pld	W	L	Pts	SW	SL	SR	SPW	SPL	SPR	Qualification
1	Soviet Union	3	2	1	5	8	3	2.667	154	114	1.351	1st–4th semifinals
2	Japan	3	2	1	5	8	6	1.333	173	159	1.088	1st–4th semifinals
3	South Korea	3	1	2	4	4	7	0.571	116	137	0.847	5th–8th semifinals
4	East Germany	3	1	2	4	4	8	0.500	127	160	0.794	5th–8th semifinals

20 September 1988	Japan	3–2	Soviet Union
20 September 1988	(15–2, 8–15, 15–12, 10–15, 19–17); Report

20 September 1988	East Germany	1–3	South Korea
20 September 1988	(6–15, 16–14, 10–15, 7–15); Report

23 September 1988	East Germany	3–2	Japan
23 September 1988	(11–15, 16–14, 4–15, 15–2 ,15–7); Report

23 September 1988	Soviet Union	3–0	South Korea
23 September 1988	(15–5, 15–8, 15–7); Report

25 September 1988	East Germany	0–3	Soviet Union
25 September 1988	(16–18, 7–15, 4–15); Report

25 September 1988	Japan	3–1	South Korea
25 September 1988	(8–15, 15–3 ,15–11, 15–8); Report

=== Group B ===
Pos	Team	Pld	W	L	Pts	SW	SL	SR	SPW	SPL	SPR	Qualification
1	Peru	3	3	0	6	9	4	2.250	177	142	1.246	1st–4th semifinals
2	China	3	2	1	5	8	4	2.000	161	132	1.220	1st–4th semifinals
3	United States	3	1	2	4	5	8	0.625	140	167	0.838	5th–8th semifinals
4	Brazil	3	0	3	3	3	9	0.333	126	163	0.773	5th–8th semifinals

20 September 1988	China	3–0	United States
20 September 1988	(15–9, 15–5, 15–7); Report

20 September 1988	Peru	3–0	Brazil
20 September 1988	(15–11, 15–11, 15–3); Report

23 September 1988	Brazil	2–3	United States
23 September 1988	(16–14, 5–15, 13–15, 15–12, 7–15); Report

23 September 1988	China	2–3	Peru
23 September 1988	(15–13, 13–15, 15–7, 12–15, 14–16); Report

25 September 1988	China	3–1	Brazil
25 September 1988	(2–15, 15–7, 15–12, 15–11); Report

25 September 1988	Peru	3–2	United States
25 September 1988	(12–15, 9–15, 15–4, 15–5, 15–9); Report

== Final round ==
=== 5th to 8th place ===
5–8th place
27 September
South Korea	2
Brazil	3
27 September
East Germany	3
United States	1

5th place
29 September
Brazil	1
East Germany	3
7th place
29 September
South Korea	2
United States	3

==== 5th–8th place semifinals ====
27 September 1988	South Korea	2–3	Brazil
27 September 1988	(6–15, 17–15, 15–8, 4–15, 15–17); Report

27 September 1988	East Germany	3–1	United States
27 September 1988	(15–13, 15–11, 10–15, 15–8); Report

==== 7th place match ====
29 September 1988	South Korea	2–3	United States
29 September 1988	(4–15, 15–12, 15–13, 9–15, 8–15); Report

==== 5th place match ====
29 September 1988	Brazil	1–3	East Germany
29 September 1988	(9–15, 4–15, 15–11, 11–15); Report

=== Final ===
Semi-finals
27 September
Soviet Union	3
China	0
27 September
Japan	2
Peru	3

Final
29 September
Soviet Union	3
Peru	2
Third place
29 September
China	3
Japan	0

==== Semifinals ====
27 September 1988	Soviet Union	3–0	China
27 September 1988	(15–0, 15–9, 15–2); Report

27 September 1988	Japan	2–3	Peru
27 September 1988	(9–15, 6–15, 15–6, 15–10, 13–15); Report

==== Bronze medal match ====
29 September 1988	China	3–0	Japan
29 September 1988	(15–13, 15–6, 15–6); Report

==== Gold medal match ====
29 September 1988	Soviet Union	3–2	Peru
29 September 1988	(10–15, 12–15, 15–13, 15–7, 17–15); Report

== Final standings ==
Place	Team
1st place, gold medalist(s)	Soviet Union
2nd place, silver medalist(s)	Peru
3rd place, bronze medalist(s)	China
4	Japan
5	East Germany
6	Brazil
7	United States
8	South Korea

1988 Women's Olympic champions

Soviet Union
4th title

12-woman roster
Valentina Ogiyenko, Yelena Volkova, Marina Kumysh, Irina Smirnova, Tatyana Sidorenko, Irina Parkhomchuk, Tatyana Kraynova, Olga Shkurnova, Marina Nikulina, Yelena Ovchinnikova, Olga Krivosheyeva, Svetlana Korytova
Head coach
Nikolay Karpol

== Medalists ==
Gold	Silver	Bronze
Soviet Union Valentina Ogiyenko; Yelena Volkova; Marina Kumysh; Irina Smirnova; Tatyana Sidorenko; Irina Parkhomchuk; Tatyana Kraynova; Olga Shkurnova; Marina Nikulina; Yelena Ovchinnikova; Olga Krivosheyeva; Svetlana Korytova Head coach: Nikolay Karpol	Peru Katherine Horny; Cenaida Uribe; Rosa García; Miriam Gallardo; Gaby Pérez; Sonia Heredia; Cecilia Tait; Luisa Cervera; Denisse Fajardo; Alejandra de la Guerra; Gina Torrealva; Natalia Málaga Head coach: Park Man-bok	China Li Guojun; Zhou Hong; Hou Yuzhu; Wang Yajun; Yang Xilan; Su Huijuan; Jiang Ying; Cui Yongmei; Yang Xiaojun; Zheng Meizhu; Wu Dan; Li Yueming Head coach: Li Yaoxian

== Awards ==
- Most valuable player
  Cecilia Tait (PER)
- Best setter
  Xilan Yang (CHN)
- Best scorer
  Irina Smirnova (URS)
- Best spiker
  Kim Oden (USA)
- Best blocker
  Susanne Lahme (GER)
- Best receiver
  Park Mi-hee (KOR)
- Best digger
  Maike Arlt (GER)
- Best server
  Grit Naumann (GER)

== Statistics leaders ==
Best scorers

Rank	Name	Total Points	Spike	Block	Serve
1	(Soviet Union) SMINRNOVA, Irina	115	104	7	4
2	(Japan) OBAYASHI, Motoko	109	101	5	3
3	(Peru) PEREZ DEL SOLAR, Gabriela	108	89	16	3
4	(Peru) TAIT, Cecilia	103	96	4	3
5	(China) HOU Yuzhu	98	90	3	5
6	(Brazil) RAMOS, Ana Claudia	94	88	3	3
7	(United States) KEMNER, Caren	90	77	6	7
8	(Germany) LAHME, Susanne	88	69	18	2
9	(Soviet Union) SIDORENKO, Tatyana	85	80	3	2
10	(Peru) FAJARDO, Denise	80	73	4	2

Best attackers

Rank	Name	Total kills	Efficiency%
1	(United States) ODEN, Kimberly	65	39.27
2	(Soviet Union) OVCHINNIKOVA, eLENA	72	37.65
3	(China) WU Dan	66	36.44
4	(Soviet Union) SMIRNOVA, Irina	104	34.53
5	(Germany) JENSEN, Grit	61	33.46

Best blockers

Rank	Name	Total blocks	Avg by set
1	(Germany) LAHME, Susanne	18	1.98
2	(Peru) PEREZ DEL SOLAR, Gabriela	16	1.63
3	(Peru) URIBE, Cenaida	15	1.22
4	(Peru) MALAGA, Natalia	11	0.92
5	(China) LI Yueming	10	0.88

Best servers

Rank	Name	Total aces	Avg by set
1	(Germany) JENSEN, Grit	10	0.77
2	(Japan) SACHIKO, Fujita	9	0.64
3	(Japan) SUGIYAMA, Akemi	8	0.62
4	(United States) ROCK, Angela	8	0.57
5	(Soviet Union) SIDORENKO, Tatyana	6	0.48

Best diggers

Rank	Name	Total digs	Avg by set
1	(Germany) ARITT, Maike	39	1.82
2	(China) WU Dan	33	1.58
3	(Peru) GARCIA, Rosa	31	1.37
4	(United States) MASAKAYAN, Liz	31	1.35
5	(South Korea) PARK Min Hee	30	1.28

Best setters

Rank	Name	Excellent	Avg by set
1	(China) YANG Xilan	210	11.28
2	(Soviet Union) PARKHOMCHUK, Irina	196	10.52
3	(Japan) NAKADA, Ikumi	165	8.83
4	(Peru) GARCIA, Rosa	148	7.43
5	(South Korea) KIM Yun-hye	128	6.72
6	(United States) KESSEL, Laurel	103	5.37
7	(Brazil) RICHA, Ana Maria	97	5.22
8	(Germany) STUDEMANN, Dorte	84	3.98

Best receivers

Rank	Name	Excellent%
1	(South Korea) PARK Mi-Hee	67.40
2	(Peru) FAJARDO, Denise	67.00
3	(Germany) ARIT, Maike	65.42
4	(Japan) MARUYAMA, Yumi	64.89
5	(United States) KEMNER, Caren	62.82

== See also ==
- Volleyball at the Summer Olympics
- Volleyball at the 1988 Summer Olympics – Men's tournament
