= 1991 Women's European Volleyball Championship =

Tournament details
- Host country: Italy
- Dates: 28 September – 6 October
- Teams: 12
- Venue: Various (in 3 host cities)

Final positions
- Champions: Soviet Union (13th title)

Tournament awards
- MVP: (Soviet Union) Irina Ilchenko

The 1991 Women's European Volleyball Championship was the 17th edition of the event, organised by Europe's governing volleyball body, the Confédération Européenne de Volleyball. It was hosted in several cities in Italy from 28 September to 6 October 1991, with the final round held in Rome.

== Participating teams ==
Team	Method of qualification
Albania	Qualification group 1 runners-up
Bulgaria	Qualification group 2 winners
Czechoslovakia	Qualification group 1 winners
France	Qualification group 4 runners-up
Germany	1989 edition second place
Greece	Qualification group 3 winners
Italy	Hosts
Netherlands	Qualification group 2 runners-up
Poland	Qualification group 4 winners
Romania	1989 edition fourth place*
Soviet Union	1989 edition first place
Yugoslavia	Qualification group 3 runners-up

*Note: As Italy qualified as hosts and for finishing the 1989 tournament as third, Romania gained a qualification place for finishing fourth in 1989.

== Format ==
The tournament was played in two different stages. In the first stage, the twelve participants were divided in two groups of six teams each. A single round-robin format was played within each group to determine the teams' group position. The second stage of the tournament consisted of two sets of semifinals to determine the tournament final ranking. The group stage firsts and seconds played the semifinals for first to fourth place, group stage thirds and fourths played the fifth to eighth place semifinals and the remaining four teams which finished group stages as fifth and sixth ended all tied in final ranking at ninth place. The pairing of the semifinals was made so teams played against the opposite group teams which finished in a different position (first played against second, third played against fourth).

== Pools composition ==
Pool A	Pool B
Albania	Czechoslovakia
Bulgaria	Germany
France	Netherlands
Greece	Poland
Italy	Romania
Soviet Union	Yugoslavia

== Venues ==
Pool A	Pool B	Final round	Tournament host cities
Ravenna	Bari	Rome	Tournament host cities

== Preliminary round ==
- All times are Central European Summer Time (UTC+02:00).

=== Pool A ===
- venue location: Ravenna, Italy

Pos	Team	Pld	W	L	Pts	SW	SL	SR	SPW	SPL	SPR	Qualification
1	Soviet Union	5	5	0	10	15	0	MAX	225	98	2.296	Semifinals
2	Italy	5	4	1	9	12	3	4.000	201	124	1.621	Semifinals
3	Bulgaria	5	3	2	8	9	9	1.000	212	203	1.044	5th–8th place
4	Greece	5	2	3	7	7	12	0.583	171	249	0.687	5th–8th place
5	France	5	1	4	6	6	12	0.500	203	225	0.902	
6	Albania	5	0	5	5	2	15	0.133	125	238	0.525	

Date	Time		Score		Set 1	Set 2	Set 3	Set 4	Set 5	Total	Report
28 Sep	15:30	Greece	3–2	France	15–9	8–15	10–15	15–5	15–13	63–57	Report
28 Sep	18:00	Soviet Union	3–0	Bulgaria	15–7	15–2	15–11			45–20	Report
28 Sep	20:30	Albania	0–3	Italy	3–15	12–15	1–15			16–45	Report
29 Sep	15:30	Soviet Union	3–0	France	15–6	15–11	15–13			45–30	Report
29 Sep	18:00	Bulgaria	0–3	Italy	7–15	9–15	9–15			25–45	Report
29 Sep	20:30	Albania	1–3	Greece	7–15	15–6	8–15	14–16		44–52	Report
30 Sep	15:30	Bulgaria	3–1	France	12–15	16–14	15–9	15–9		58–47	Report
30 Sep	18:00	Albania	0–3	Soviet Union	2–15	7–15	6–15			15–45	Report
30 Sep	20:30	Greece	0–3	Italy	1–15	6–15	7–15			14–45	Report
2 Oct	15:45	France	0–3	Italy	6–15	6–15	12–15			24–45	Report
2 Oct	18:00	Greece	0–3	Soviet Union	7–15	2–15	3–15			12–45	Report
2 Oct	20:30	Albania	1–3	Bulgaria	7–15	15–6	11–15	3–15		36–51	Report
3 Oct	15:30	Greece	1–3	Bulgaria	15–13	5–15	7–15	3–15		30–58	Report
3 Oct	18:00	Albania	0–3	France	4–15	1–15	9–15			14–45	Report
3 Oct	20:30	Soviet Union	3–0	Italy	15–6	15–6	15–9			45–21	Report

=== Pool B ===
- venue location: Bari, Italy

Pos	Team	Pld	W	L	Pts	SW	SL	SR	SPW	SPL	SPR	Qualification
1	Netherlands	5	4	1	9	14	3	4.667	246	171	1.439	Semifinals
2	Germany	5	4	1	9	13	6	2.167	258	186	1.387	Semifinals
3	Romania	5	3	2	8	10	8	1.250	222	203	1.094	5th–8th place
4	Czechoslovakia	5	3	2	8	10	9	1.111	231	203	1.138	5th–8th place
5	Poland	5	1	4	6	6	14	0.429	216	254	0.850	
6	Yugoslavia	5	0	5	5	2	15	0.133	93	249	0.373	

Date	Time		Score		Set 1	Set 2	Set 3	Set 4	Set 5	Total	Report
28 Sep	15:30	Yugoslavia	2–3	Poland	15–13	15–11	4–15	7–15	5–15	46–69	Report
28 Sep	18:00	Netherlands	3–0	Czechoslovakia	17–15	17–15	15–13			49–43	Report
28 Sep	20:30	Romania	1–3	Germany	4–15	6–15	15–12	12–15		37–57	Report
29 Sep	15:30	Netherlands	3–0	Poland	15–7	15–8	15–4			45–19	Report
29 Sep	18:00	Czechoslovakia	3–1	Germany	15–11	3–15	15–10	15–3		48–39	Report
29 Sep	20:30	Romania	3–0	Yugoslavia	15–9	15–7	15–2			45–18	Report
30 Sep	15:30	Czechoslovakia	3–2	Poland	15–8	3–15	15–9	9–15	15–6	57–53	Report
30 Sep	18:00	Romania	0–3	Netherlands	10–15	7–15	11–15			28–45	Report
30 Sep	20:30	Yugoslavia	0–3	Germany	6–15	2–15	1–15			9–45	Report
2 Oct	15:30	Romania	3–1	Czechoslovakia	15–11	15–10	6–15	15–2		51–38	Report
2 Oct	18:00	Yugoslavia	0–3	Netherlands	4–15	4–15	1–15			9–45	Report
2 Oct	20:30	Poland	0–3	Germany	12–15	8–15	10–15			30–45	Report
3 Oct	15:30	Netherlands	2–3	Germany	15–12	14–16	4–15	16–14	13–15	62–72	Report
3 Oct	18:00	Romania	3–1	Poland	15–13	16–17	15–4	15–11		61–45	Report
3 Oct	20:30	Yugoslavia	0–3	Czechoslovakia	3–15	6–15	2–15			11–45	Report

== Final round ==
- venue location: Rome, Italy
- All times are Central European Summer Time (UTC+02:00).

=== 5th–8th place ===
- Pools A and B third and fourth positions play each other.

Semifinals
5 Oct
Czechoslovakia	3
Bulgaria	1
5 Oct
Romania	3
Greece	1

5th place
6 Oct
Czechoslovakia	3
Romania	1
7th place
6 Oct
Bulgaria	3
Greece	2

==== 5th–8th semifinals ====
Date	Time		Score		Set 1	Set 2	Set 3	Set 4	Set 5	Total	Report
5 Oct	9:00	Romania	3–1	Greece	15–9	15–8	5–15	15–10		50–42	Report
5 Oct	11:30	Czechoslovakia	3–1	Bulgaria	15–5	15–7	14–16	15–12		59–40	Report

==== 7th place match ====
Date	Time		Score		Set 1	Set 2	Set 3	Set 4	Set 5	Total	Report
6 Oct	9:00	Bulgaria	3–2	Greece	15–12	15–11	12–15	11–15	15–13	68–66	Report

==== 5th place match ====
Date	Time		Score		Set 1	Set 2	Set 3	Set 4	Set 5	Total	Report
6 Oct	11:30	Czechoslovakia	3–1	Romania	15–10	5–15	16–14	15–10		51–49	Report

=== Final ===
- Pools A and B first and second positions play each other.

Semifinals
5 Oct
Soviet Union	3
Germany	0
5 Oct
Netherlands	3
Italy	1

Final
6 Oct
Soviet Union	3
Netherlands	0
3rd place
6 Oct
Germany	3
Italy	1

==== Semifinals ====
Date	Time		Score		Set 1	Set 2	Set 3	Set 4	Set 5	Total	Report
5 Oct	16:00	Netherlands	3–1	Italy	12–15	15–6	15–7	16–14		58–42	Report
5 Oct	18:30	Soviet Union	3–0	Germany	15–6	15–3	15–11			45–20	Report

==== 3rd place match ====
Date	Time		Score		Set 1	Set 2	Set 3	Set 4	Set 5	Total	Report
6 Oct	15:00	Germany	3–1	Italy	9–15	15–8	15–7	15–10		54–40	Report

==== Final ====
Date	Time		Score		Set 1	Set 2	Set 3	Set 4	Set 5	Total	Report
6 Oct	17:30	Soviet Union	3–0	Netherlands	15–4	15–2	15–3			45–9	Report

== Final ranking ==
Place	Team
1st place, gold medalist(s)	Soviet Union
2nd place, silver medalist(s)	Netherlands
3rd place, bronze medalist(s)	Germany
4.	Italy
5.	Czechoslovakia
6.	Romania
7.	Bulgaria
8.	Greece
9.	France
9.	Poland
9.	Albania
9.	Yugoslavia

Qualified for the 1992 Olympic Games as reigning champions
Qualified for the 1992 Olympic Games

1991 Women's European champions

Soviet Union
13th title

Team Roster
Evgenya Artamonova, Elena Batoukhtina, Galina Lebedeva, Natalya Morozova, Marina Nikoulina, Valentina Ogienko, Irina Parkhomchuk, Tatyana Sidorenko, Irina Smirnova, Elena Tchebukina, Yulia Timonova, Svetlana Vasiievskaya, and Elena Vorobieva.
Head Coach: Nikolay Karpol.

== Individual awards ==
- MVP: Irina Ilchenko (URS)
- Best spiker: Henriëtte Weersing (NED)
- Best setter: Marina Pankova (URS)
