= Qi Lili =

Chinese volleyball player and coach

Personal information
- Nationality: Chinese
- Born: 19 April 1971 (age 55)
- Height: 1.81 m (5 ft 11 in)

Volleyball information
- Number: 2 (1990); 11 (1991); 17 (1994)

Career
| Years | Teams |
|---|---|
| 1994 | Zhejiang |

National team
| 1990–1994 | China |
Honours
Women's volleyball
Representing China
World Championship
| Silver medal – second place | 1990 China | Team |
FIVB World Cup
| Silver medal – second place | 1991 Japan |

Qi Lili (born 19 April 1971) is a Chinese former volleyball player and coach. She was part of the China women's national volleyball team.

Qi won a silver medal at the 1990 FIVB World Championship in China and participated at the 1994 FIVB World Championship in Brazil. On club level she played with Zhejiang.

== Clubs ==
- (China) Zhejiang (1994)
