= Beverly Oden =

American volleyball player (born 1971)

Personal information
- Full name: Beverly Jean Oden
- Born: March 9, 1971 (age 55); Millington, Tennessee, U.S.
- Height: 6 ft 2 in (188 cm)
- Education: Stanford University

Volleyball information
- Position: Middle blocker
- Number: 7

National team
1992–1996	United States
Medal record
Women's volleyball
Representing the United States
Goodwill Games
Silver medal – second place	1994 Saint Petersburg	Team
Pan American Games
Silver medal – second place	1995 Mar del Plata	Team

Beverly ("Bev") Oden (born March 9, 1971) is a former volleyball player from the United States. She played middle blocker for the United States women's national volleyball team at the 1996 Summer Olympics in Atlanta.

Among her achievements, Oden helped the United States win silver medals at the 1994 Goodwill Games in Saint Petersburg and the 1995 Pan American Games in Mar del Plata.

== College ==
Oden played volleyball for Stanford University as a middle blocker and was named the 1990 NCAA Player of the Year. Oden was the first to be named to the AVCA All-America first-team all four years of her collegiate eligibility (1989–1992). In 1991, she won the Honda-Broderick Award (now the Honda Sports Award) as the nation's best female collegiate volleyball player.

In 2001, Oden was inducted into the Stanford Athletics Hall of Fame.

== Personal life ==
Oden's sisters, Kim and Elaina, were also Olympians who played on the United States national volleyball team.

Oden made the news in 2007 when she was held in custody by Orange County sheriff deputies near her hometown of Irvine, California in relation to a reported incident. She was released after being questioned and spending an hour and a half inside a police car. She was found to have no connection with the incident in question, and her ordeal prompted local community leaders to form the Oden Commission to hold discussions on racial profiling between residents and law enforcement.

== Awards ==
- Four-time AVCA All-American — 1989–1992
- NCAA Player of the Year — 1990
- Honda-Broderick Award — 1991
- Goodwill Games silver medal — 1994
- Pan American Games silver medal — 1995
- Stanford Athletics Hall of Fame — 2001
