= Deka Moni =

Deka Moni (デカモニ。) was a Japanese group consisting of one member, volleyball player Motoko Obayashi, presumably chosen because of her height. She appears four times on the single cover to give the impression of a group with four members. Although Deka Moni is not a part of Hello! Project, Tsunku produced the single, which features a cover of Minimoni's "Jankenpyon!" as its c/w track.

== Single ==
Released: August 7, 2001

Tracklist :

1. Ookina Watashi no Chiisana Koi (大きな私の小さな恋)
2. Deka Moni. Jankenpyon! (デカモニ。ジャンケンぴょん！)
3. 大きな私の小さな恋（カラオケ） (Ookina Watashi no Chiisana Koi (Karaoke))
