= Cristina Lopes (volleyball) =

Brazilian volleyball player (born 1966)

Personal information
- Full name: Cristina Pacheco Lopes
- Nickname: Tina
- Born: 29 January 1966 (age 60); Brasília, Brazil
- Height: 1.77 m (5 ft 10 in)

Volleyball information
- Position: Middle blocker
- Number: 7

National team
1985–1993	Brazil
Honours
Women's volleyball
Representing Brazil
Goodwill Games
Bronze medal – third place	1990 Seattle
Pan American Games
Silver medal – second place	1991 Havana	Team
CSV South American Championship
Gold medal – first place	1991 Osasco
Silver medal – second place	1985 Caracas
Silver medal – second place	1987 Punta del Este

Cristina Lopes (born 29 January 1966) is a Brazilian volleyball player. She competed in the women's tournament at the 1992 Summer Olympics in Barcelona, Spain.
