= Cilene Rocha =

Brazilian volleyball player (born 1967)

Personal information
- Full name: Cilene Falleiro Rocha (-Drewnick)
- Born: 19 June 1967 (age 59); Brasília, Brazil
- Died: N/A still alive
- Height: 1.83 m (6 ft 0 in)

Volleyball information
- Position: Outside hitter
- Number: 9

National team
1990–1997	Brazil
Honours
Women's volleyball
Representing Brazil
World Grand Champions Cup
Bronze medal – third place	1997 Japan
Goodwill Games
Bronze medal – third place	1990 Seattle
Pan American Games
Silver medal – second place	1991 Havana	Team
CSV South American Championship
Gold medal – first place	1991 Osasco
Gold medal – first place	1997 Lima

Cilene Rocha (born 19 June 1967), known professionally as Cilene Drewnick, is a Brazilian volleyball coach and former player. She competed in the women's tournament at the 1992 Summer Olympics in Barcelona, Spain.

== Club volleyball ==
At club level, Drewnick competed with Osasco Voleibol Clube in the Brazilian Volleyball Super League and with Volley Bergamo in the Italian Women's Volleyball League.

== Coaching ==
Drewnick is the head trainer at the Instinct Volleyball Club in Lake Dallas, Texas. She has coached Brazilian and United States national volleyball teams.
