= Caren Kemner =

American volleyball player (born 1965)

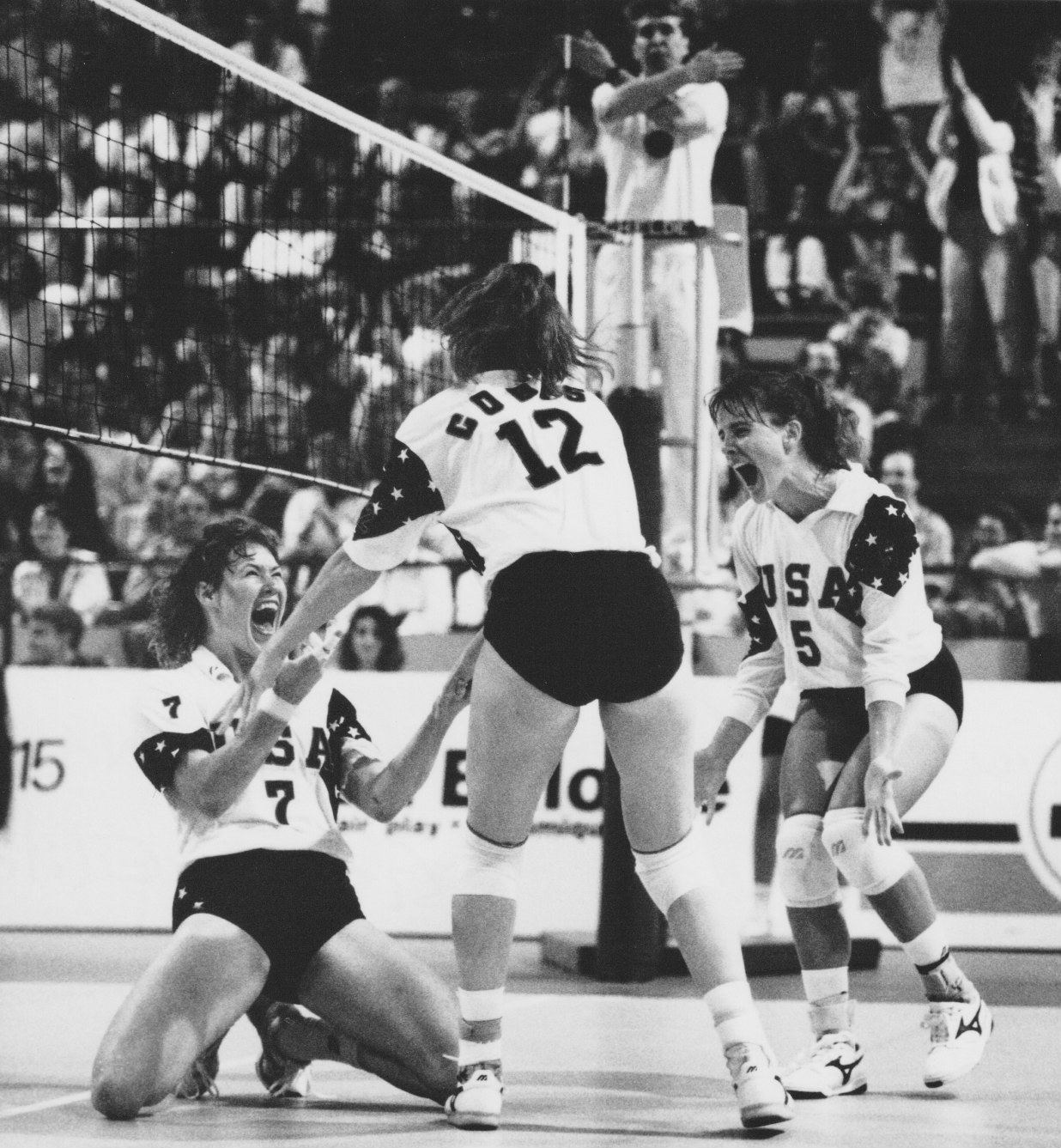

Personal information
- Born: Caren Marie Alexius Kemner; April 16, 1965 (age 61); Quincy, Illinois, U.S.
- Height: 6 ft 1 in (185 cm)
- Education: University of Arizona

Volleyball information
- Position: Outside hitter
- Number: 7 (1988–1992); 4 (1996); 9 (University of Arizona)

National team
1985–1996	United States
Medal record
Women's volleyball
Representing the United States
Olympic Games
Bronze medal – third place	1992 Barcelona	Team
World Championship
Bronze medal – third place	1990 China	Team
FIVB World Grand Prix
Gold medal – first place	1995 Shanghai
Goodwill Games
Bronze medal – third place	1986 Moscow
Pan American Games
Bronze medal – third place	1987 Indianapolis	Team

Caren Marie Alexius Kemner (born April 16, 1965) is an American former volleyball player and three-time Olympian.

Kemner was inducted into the International Volleyball Hall of Fame in 2013.

== High school ==
Kemner played volleyball at Quincy Notre Dame High School, and led her team to an undefeated season and a state championship in 1980 as a sophomore. She graduated from high school in 1983.

== College ==
Kemner played two seasons of college women's volleyball and softball at the University of Arizona. She was an AVCA second-team All-American in volleyball in 1984.

Kemner was inducted into the University of Arizona Sports Hall of Fame in 1992.

== National team ==
Kemner competed with the United States women's national volleyball team at the 1986 Goodwill Games in Moscow, where she won a bronze medal. She made her Olympic debut at the 1988 Summer Olympics in Seoul, finishing seventh. She helped the United States to the bronze medal at the 1990 FIVB World Championship in China. She won another bronze medal at the 1992 Summer Olympics in Barcelona. Kemner then won a gold medal at the 1995 FIVB World Grand Prix in Shanghai. She played her third and final Olympics at the 1996 Summer Olympics in Atlanta, finishing seventh.

Kemner was the International Volleyball Federation (FIVB) female player of the year in 1991.

== Beach volleyball ==
Kemner played in one beach volleyball tournament in 1987 in Santa Monica, California, partnering with Kim Oden. She briefly returned to beach volleyball between 1999 and 2000, notably partnering with Karolyn Kirby.

== Coaching ==
Kemner coached the women's volleyball team at Culver-Stockton College from 2010 to 2021, and also coached the men's team from 2017 to 2021.

On May 6, 2021, Kemner was named head coach for the men's volleyball team at Quincy University after the previous coach Gavin Mueller stepped down.

== International competitions ==
- 1985 – NORCECA (silver)
- 1986 – World Championships
- 1986 – Goodwill Games (bronze)
- 1987 – NORCECA (silver)
- 1987 – Pan American Games (bronze)
- 1988 – Summer Olympics
- 1990 – Goodwill Games
- 1990 – World Championships (bronze)
- 1991 – NORCECA (silver)
- 1991 – World Gala
- 1991 – World Cup
- 1992 – Summer Olympics (bronze)
- 1992 – FIVB Super Four (bronze)
- 1993 – NORCECA Championships (silver)
- 1993 – FIVB Grand Champions Cup
- 1995 – World Grand Prix (gold)
- 1995 – World Cup
- 1996 – Summer Olympics (7th place)
