= Tammy Leibl =

American volleyball player

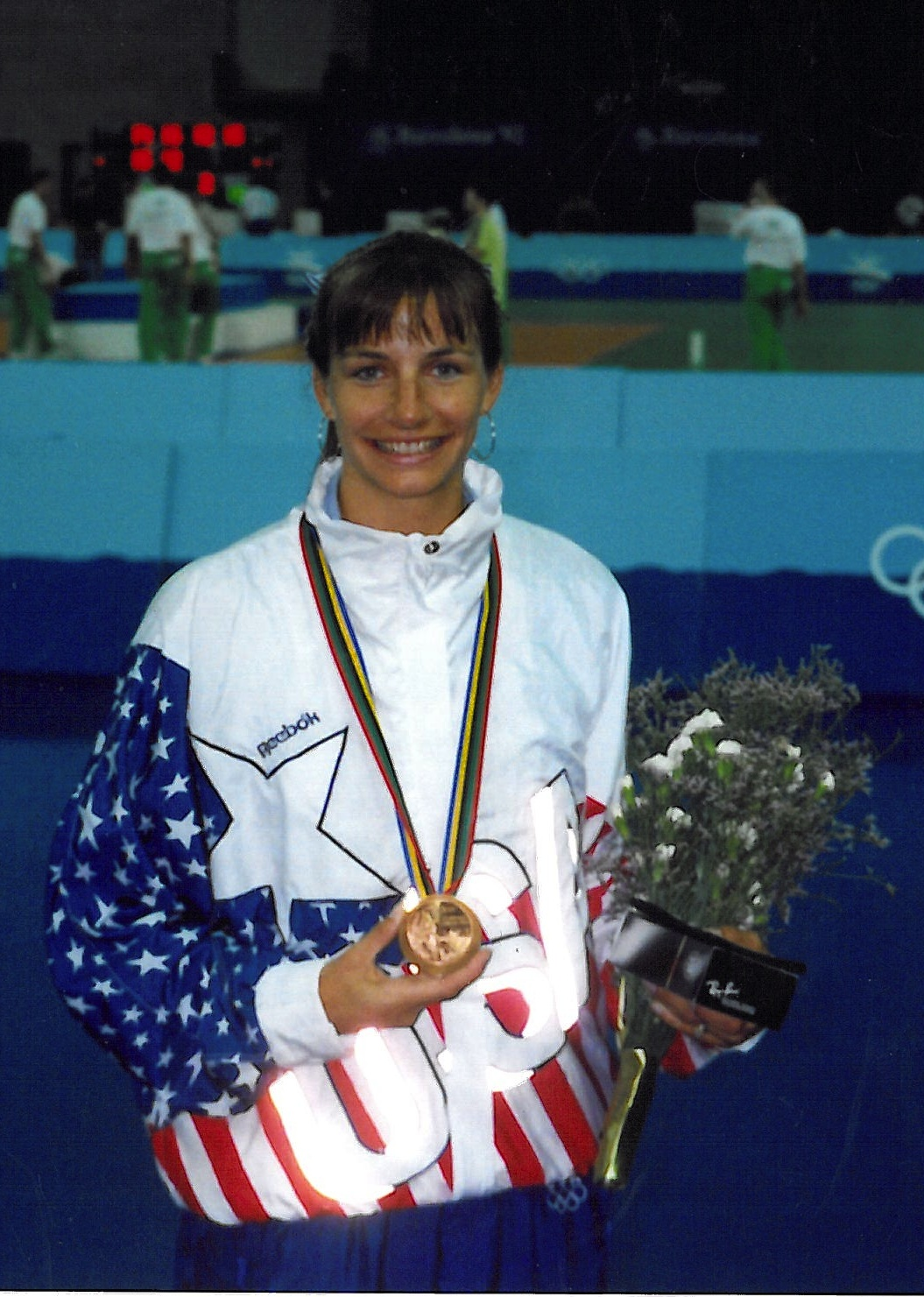

Personal information
- Full name: Tammy Leibl (formerly Tammy June Webb-Liley)
- Born: March 6, 1965 (age 61); Westminster, California, U.S. / Long Beach, California, U.S.
- Hometown: Del Mar, California, U.S.
- Height: 5 ft 11 in (1.80 m)
- Education: Arizona State University

Beach volleyball information
| Years | Teammate |
|---|---|
| 2008; 2007; 2006; 2005; 2004; 2001; 1999 | Sarah Straton; Lina Yanchulova; Dianne DeNecochea; Cheri Fitzner; Dianne DeNecochea; Lynda Johnson-Black; Lynda Johnson-Black |

Indoor volleyball information
- Position: Middle blocker
- Number: 8 (national team); 2 (ASU)

National team
| 1987–1996 | United States |
Medal record
Women's volleyball
Representing the United States
Olympic Games
| Bronze medal – third place | 1992 Barcelona | Team |
World Championship
| Bronze medal – third place | 1990 China | Team |
World Grand Prix
| Gold medal – first place | 1995 Shanghai |
NORCECA Championships
| Silver medal – second place | 1993 Colorado Springs |
| Silver medal – second place | 1991 Regina |
| Bronze medal – third place | 1989 San Juan |

Tammy Leibl (aka Tammy Webb; Tammy June Webb-Liley; and Tammy Liley, born March 5/6, 1965) is a retired American female indoor volleyball and beach volleyball player. She played college volleyball at Arizona State University and won the bronze medal with the U.S. national team at the 1992 Summer Olympics.

== Olympics and national team ==
Tammy joined the U.S.A. National Volleyball team in 1987 and was a member of the team for ten years, retiring in 1996. Tammy played in 3 Olympic Games including Seoul (1988) Barcelona (1992) and Atlanta (1996) all under head coach Terry Liskevych. Tammy was team captain from 1993–1996 and was the first American women to play in over 400 international matches.

Some other noteworthy events Tammy’s career include the following:

1996 Olympic Games, Atlanta, USA
1995 World Cup, World Grand Prix (Gold), Canada Cup (Gold), Pan American Games (Silver)
1994 World Championship, World Grand Prix
1993 FIVB Grand Champions Cup, NORCECA Championships (Silver)
1992 Olympics (Bronze), Barcelona, Spain, FIVB Super Four (Bronze)
1991 World Cup, NORCECA (Silver)
1990 World Championship (bronze), Goodwill Games
1989 NORCECA (bronze)
1988 Olympics, Seoul, Korea
1987 Pan American Games

== Professional indoor volleyball ==
Played for Dayvit in Brazilian League 1997–98 winning Paulista Championship under Olympic Gold Medal coach Jose Roberto Guimaraes along with Anna Moser and other Brazilian national team players. Also played in Italian League for Spezzano 1996–1997 under current women’s Bulgarian national team coach Giovanni Guidetti. In 1995–96 named League MVP as member of Utah Predators of the National Volleyball Association. Also played for Racing Club in France during winter of 1991–92.

== Beach volleyball ==
Won AVP Rookie of the Year in 2004 at age of 39. During a 4-year career on the AVP Tammy earned $104,248 and seven 3rd-place finishes, playing most of her tournaments with partner Dianne DeNecochea. Tammy was coached by Angela Rock and Joel DeNecochea. During her four-person beach career Tammy was named to Bud Light Pro Beach Volleyball Tour All-League Team in 1994 and 1993 as a member of '94-champs, Team Sony Autosound and '93-champs Team Champion.

== College and high school ==
All-America and All-Pac-10 Conference performer as junior and senior (1985–86) at Arizona State University. Inducted into ASU Hall of Fame in 1996 and was nominated for PAC-10 Female Athlete of the Decade. Member of 1985 World University Games Team. Earned All-America recognition from the National Strength and Conditioning Association for her work in the Sun Devil weight room. Coached at ASU by Debbie Brown (former USA national team player and assistant coach).

She graduated class of 1983 from Ocean View High School, Huntington Beach, California. She played 2 years of Seahawk volleyball, coached by Tom Thorton, where she was named first-team All-Sunset League her senior year. She also lettered in basketball, track, and softball. Played for the Cal Juniors Club Team. Was named to the 1983 Volleyball Monthly Fab 50 Roster, and further honored as a member of the All-Time 50 Elite. She played on the volleyball team for three years and was named to the All-Sunset League first team as a senior.

Liley then played volleyball at Arizona State. She was an All-American in 1985 and 1986, her junior and senior years.

== International ==
Liley joined the U.S. national team in 1987. She played in the 1988 Summer Olympics and 1992 Summer Olympics, helping the U.S. win the bronze medal in 1992. In 1993, she became the team captain and was named the USOC Female Volleyball Athlete of the Year. She was the first woman to play 400 international matches for the U.S.

== Awards and honors ==
FIVB All-World Team - 1995
Inducted into Arizona State University Hall of Fame – 1996
U.S.A. Volleyball Most Valuable Player – 1993
All-Tournament Team at 1994 Canada Cup
All-Tournament Team at 1994BCV Volley Cup
USOC Female Volleyball Athlete of the Year – 1993
Nominee for PAC-10 Female Athlete of the Decade
2004 AVP Rookie of the Year

== Personal ==
Liley was born in Long Beach, California. She is 5 feet 11 inches (1.80 m) tall. She married Brad Liley in 1989.

She is currently coaching at the Wave Volleyball Club in Del Mar and also serves as an assistant coach of the women’s volleyball team at the University of San Diego under Head Coach Jennifer Petrie. She is married to Geoff Leibl and has two sons, Tyler and Noah.
