= Elaina Oden =

American volleyball player (born 1967)

Personal information
- Full name: Elaina Joyce Oden
- Born: March 21, 1967 (age 59); Orange, California, U.S.
- Height: 6 ft 1 in (185 cm)
- Education: University of the Pacific

Volleyball information
- Position: Middle blocker
- Number: 9

National team
1986, 1990–1997	United States
Medal record
Women's volleyball
Representing the United States
Olympic Games
Bronze medal – third place	1992 Barcelona	Team
World Championship
Bronze medal – third place	1990 China	Team
FIVB World Grand Prix
Gold medal – first place	1995 Shanghai
Goodwill Games
Bronze medal – third place	1986 Moscow
Pan American Games
Silver medal – second place	1995 Mar del Plata	Team

Elaina Oden (born March 21, 1967) is a former volleyball player from the United States who won the bronze medal with the United States women's national volleyball team at the 1992 Summer Olympics in Barcelona. She also competed in the 1996 Summer Olympics in Atlanta.

Oden was a member of the U.S. junior national team in 1985. During her tenure with the national team, she competed at the 1986 Goodwill Games and the 1990 FIVB World Championship, earning a bronze medal in each event. She also won a silver medal at the 1995 Pan American Games.

== High school ==
Oden attended Irvine High School in Irvine, California, and was a standout in volleyball, basketball, soccer, softball, and track & field, where she was the state champion in the shot put her senior year. As a senior, she was named the School's Athlete of the Year.

== College ==
Oden is remembered as one of the most decorated women's volleyball players in University of the Pacific history. Oden was the key player on Pacific's back-to-back NCAA national championship teams. Highlights of those seasons included defeats of UCLA and Stanford for the NCAA title in 1985 and the steamrolling of Texas and Nebraska en route to the 1986 crown.

Oden is Pacific's all-time single season hitting percentage leader (.380 in 1985), and she was named PCAA Most Valuable Player in 1985. Until recently, Oden held the Pacific single season kill record (547) and the all-time career kills mark (1,485). Oden's .357 hitting percentage in 1986 places her third on Pacific's all-time list.

In leading the Tigers to back-to-back NCAA Championships, Oden was named an All-American at the middle blocker position in both 1985 and 1986 as the Tigers amassed a combined record of 75–6. Volleyball Monthly recognized her as its 1986 National Player of the Year. Oden added a third All-America honor in 1989, helping the Tigers to a record of 29–5. She is one of four Tiger volleyball players to have their jersey number retired by the Pacific Athletic Department.

When it comes to career records, Oden ranks second in career hitting percentage (.341), third in digs (1,229), third in block solos (138), fourth in block assists (396), and fourth in total blocks (534). In addition, Oden set the Pacific freshman record of 547 kills in 1985. Oden was nominated for the NCAA's Broderick Award in 1985 and 1986.

In 2000, Oden was inducted into the University of the Pacific Hall of Fame.

== Awards ==
- PCAA Most Valuable Player — 1985
- Two-time NCAA Champion — 1985, 1986
- Three-time All-American — 1985, 1986, 1989
- Goodwill Games bronze medal — 1986
- Volleyball Monthly National Player of the Year — 1986
- FIVB World Championship bronze medal — 1990
- Olympic bronze medal — 1992
- Pan American Games silver medal — 1995
- FIVB World Grand Prix gold medal — 1995
- University of the Pacific Hall of Fame — 2000

== Personal life ==
Oden's sisters, Kim and Beverly, were also outstanding volleyball players who played on the national team.
