= Svetlana Korytova =

Russian volleyball player

Personal information
- Full name: Svetlana Vadimovna Korytova
- Nationality: Russian
- Born: 24 March 1968 (age 58); Sverdlovsk, Soviet Union
- Height: 1.85 m (6 ft 1 in)
- Weight: 76 kg (168 lb)

Volleyball information
- Position: Opposite
- Number: 13

National team
1988–1991; 1992; 1993	Soviet Union; CIS; Russia
Honours

Women's volleyball
Representing the Soviet Union
Olympic Games
Gold medal – first place	1988 Seoul	Team
World Championship
Gold medal – first place	1990 China	Team
FIVB World Cup
Silver medal – second place	1989 Japan
Bronze medal – third place	1991 Japan
Goodwill Games
Gold medal – first place	1990 Seattle
European Championships
Gold medal – first place	1989 Stuttgart
Gold medal – first place	1991 Rome
Representing the Unified Team
Silver medal – second place	1992 Barcelona	Team
Representing Russia
FIVB World Grand Prix
Silver medal – second place	1993 Hong Kong

Svetlana Vadimovna Korytova (Russian: Светлана Вадимовна Корытова; born 24 March 1968) is a Russian volleyball player who was a member of the national team that won the gold medal at the 1988 Summer Olympics in Seoul. Four years later, she won a silver medal with the Unified Team at the 1992 Summer Olympics in Barcelona.
