= Teee Sanders =

American volleyball player

Tonya Slacanin

Personal information
- Full name: Tonya Denise Williams (-Slacanin)
- Nickname: Teee
- Born: Tonya Denise Williams; March 28, 1968 (age 58); Los Angeles, California, U.S.
- Height: 5 ft 11 in (1.80 m)
- Spike: 129 in (328 cm)
- Block: 120 in (304 cm)
- Education: University of Hawaii

Volleyball information
- Position: Outside Hitter
- Number: 1

National team
1990–1996	United States
Medal record
Women's volleyball
Representing the United States
Olympic Games
Bronze medal – third place	1992 Barcelona	Indoor
World Championship
Bronze medal – third place	1990 China	Indoor
FIVB World Grand Prix
Gold medal – first place	1995 Shanghai
Pan American Games
Silver medal – second place	1995 Mar del Plata	Indoor

Tonya Slacanin (born March 28, 1968), formerly known as "Teee" Williams or "Teee" Sanders, is a retired female volleyball player from the United States. She won a bronze medal with the USA National Team at the 1992 Summer Olympics in Barcelona. She also competed at the 1996 Summer Olympics in Atlanta, finishing in seventh place.

Among her achievements, Slacanin helped the national team win a silver medal at the 1995 Pan American Games in Mar del Plata.

== College ==
Slacanin played college women's volleyball with the Hawaii Rainbow Wahine volleyball team. She helped Hawaii to the national title in 1987. She was a three-time AVCA first-team All-American, and the 1987 and 1989 National Player of the Year. She also set the record for most attacks in a match with 99 against Cal Poly on December 8, 1989. In the same season, Slacanin set a school record with 44 kills in a match against UC Santa Barbara.

In 1998, Slacanin was inducted into the University of Hawaii Sports Circle of Honor.

== International ==
Slacanin played for Orion Sesto San Giovanni Milano in the Italian championship in 1992–93, and then for PVF Parmalat Matera from 1996 to 1998. She won the European "CEV-Cup" in 1994 with the German team USC Münster. She also won as the national Championship and Cup title in Germany in 2004 with USC Münster.

== Beach volleyball ==
Slacanin won a German beach volleyball tournament in 2003, partnering with Ines Pianka.

== Personal life ==
While playing collegiately at the University of Hawaii, Slacanin married an Army soldier by the last name Sanders, and her name became Teee Williams-Sanders. The marriage ended in divorce with Slacanin taking back her maiden name of Williams. She has since remarried, and is currently Tonya Slacanin.

== International competitions ==
- 1990 – Goodwill Games
- 1990 – World Championships (bronze)
- 1991 – World Cup
- 1992 – Summer Olympics (bronze)
- 1992 – FIVB Super Four (bronze)
- 1993 – FIVB Grand Champions Cup
- 1994 – World Grand Prix
- 1994 – World Championship
- 1995 – Pan American Games (silver)
- 1995 – Canada Cup (gold)
- 1995 – World Grand Prix (gold)
