= Saskia van Hintum =

Dutch volleyball player and coach

Johanna Antoinette Petronella ("Saskia") van Hintum (born 24 April 1970 in Vught, North Brabant) is a retired female volleyball player and later coach from the Netherlands, who represented her place of origin/ native country at the 1996 Summer Olympics in Atlanta, Georgia, finishing in fifth place.
