= 1995 FIVB Volleyball World Grand Prix =

International women's volleyball tournament

1995 FIVB World Grand Prix
Tournament details
- Host country: China (Group 1 Final)
- Dates: 18 August – 17 September
- Teams: 12
- Venue: 1 (in 1 host city)

Final positions
- Champions: United States (3rd title)
- Runners-up: Brazil
- Third place: Cuba
- Fourth place: China

Tournament awards
- MVP: (United States) Tara Cross-Battle
- Best Setter: (United States) Lori Endicott
- Best OH: (United States) Tara Cross-Battle; (Russia) Yevgeniya Estes
- Best MB: (United States) Elaina Oden; (Cuba) Ana Ibis Fernandez
- Best OPP: (United States) Tammy Webb

The 1995 FIVB World Grand Prix was the third women's volleyball tournament of its kind, played by eight countries from 18 August to 17 September 1995. The final round was staged in Shanghai.

== Preliminary round ==
=== Ranking ===
The host China and top three teams in the preliminary round advance to the final round.

Pos	Team	Pld	W	L	Pts	SW	SL	SR	SPW	SPL	SPR	Qualification
1	United States	12	11	1	23	35	18	1.944	719	598	1.202	Final round
2	Cuba	12	10	2	22	31	15	2.067	614	514	1.195	Final round
3	Brazil	12	8	4	20	31	17	1.824	648	495	1.309	Final round
4	China (Note: Qualified as hosts) (H)	12	7	5	19	28	19	1.474	596	532	1.120	Final round
5	Russia	12	5	7	17	23	28	0.821	588	638	0.922	
6	South Korea	12	4	8	16	20	25	0.800	525	544	0.965	
7	Japan	12	3	9	15	17	29	0.586	535	596	0.898	
8	Germany	12	0	12	12	2	36	0.056	255	563	0.453	

(H) Host

=== First round ===
==== Group A ====
- Venue: Honolulu, United States

Date		Score		Set 1	Set 2	Set 3	Set 4	Set 5	Total
18 Ago	Cuba	3–1	China	13–15	15–12	15–11	15–8		58–46
18 Ago	United States	3–1	Japan	16–14	13–15	15–8	15–8		59–45
19 Ago	Cuba	3–0	Japan	15–5	16–14	15–13			46–32
19 Ago	United States	3–2	China	7–15	15–6	16–14	12–15	15–13	65–63
20 Ago	China	3–1	Japan	15–4	5–15	15–9	15–10		50–38
20 Ago	Cuba	3–2	United States	15–12	15–7	14–16	7–15	17–15	68–65

==== Group B ====
- Venue: Belo Horizonte, Brazil

Date		Score		Set 1	Set 2	Set 3	Set 4	Set 5	Total
18 Ago	South Korea	3–1	Russia	15–9	15–9	9–15	15–11		54–44
18 Ago	Brazil	3–0	Germany	15–1	15–8	15–3			45–12
19 Ago	Russia	3–0	Germany	15–5	15–6	15–4			45–15
19 Ago	Brazil	3–0	South Korea	15–3	15–5	15–10			45–18
20 Ago	South Korea	3–0	Germany	15–1	15–4	16–14			46–19
20 Ago	Russia	3–2	Brazil	15–11	7–15	4–15	15–9	18–16	59–66

=== Second round ===
==== Group C ====
- Venue: Taipei, Taiwan

Date		Score		Set 1	Set 2	Set 3	Set 4	Set 5	Total
25 Ago	United States	3–2	Brazil	10–15	15–4	5–15	15–12	15–13	60–59
25 Ago	Japan	3–0	Germany	15–4	15–12	15–8			45–24
26 Ago	Brazil	3–2	Japan	3–15	15–11	12–15	15–9	18–16	63–66
26 Ago	United States	3–0	Germany	15–4	15–6	15–6			45–16
27 Ago	United States	3–1	Japan	15–10	13–15	15–10	15–10		58–45
27 Ago	Brazil	3–1	Germany	15–8	15–10	13–15	15–6		58–39

==== Group D ====
- Venue: Jakarta, Indonesia

Date		Score		Set 1	Set 2	Set 3	Set 4	Set 5	Total
25 Ago	China	3–0	South Korea	15–9	15–9	15–13			45–31
25 Ago	Cuba	3–0	Russia	15–12	15–9	15–3			45–24
26 Ago	Cuba	3–1	South Korea	15–9	15–10	14–16	15–2		59–37
26 Ago	Russia	3–2	China	7–15	15–5	13–15	15–8	15–12	65–55
27 Ago	Russia	3–1	South Korea	15–7	9–15	15–13	17–16		56–51
27 Ago	Cuba	3–1	China	15–10	15–10	12–15	15–9		57–44

=== Third round ===
==== Group E ====
- Venue: Tokyo, Japan

Date		Score		Set 1	Set 2	Set 3	Set 4	Set 5	Total
1 Sep	United States	3–1	South Korea	15–11	14–16	15–10	15–5		59–42
1 Sep	Japan	3–1	Russia	15–8	15–12	14–16	15–10		59–46
2 Sep	South Korea	3–0	Japan	15–7	15–5	15–8			45–20
2 Sep	United States	3–2	Russia	15–13	11–15	15–6	11–15	15–13	67–62
3 Sep	Russia	3–2	South Korea	15–11	10–15	4–15	15–12	15–11	59–64
3 Sep	United States	3–2	Japan	15–7	12–15	15–11	13–15	18–16	73–64

==== Group F ====
- Venue: Macau

Date		Score		Set 1	Set 2	Set 3	Set 4	Set 5	Total
1 Sep	Cuba	3–1	Brazil	15–8	15–10	4–15	16–14		50–47
1 Sep	China	3–0	Germany	15–4	15–4	15–5			45–13
2 Sep	Brazil	3–0	Germany	15–7	15–1	15–3			45–11
2 Sep	China	3–0	Cuba	15–6	17–16	15–10			47–32
3 Sep	Cuba	3–0	Germany	15–10	15–4	15–7			45–21
3 Sep	China	3–2	Brazil	9–15	15–10	15–10	8–15	15–10	62–60

=== Fourth round ===
==== Group G ====
- Venue: Hamamatsu, Japan

Date		Score		Set 1	Set 2	Set 3	Set 4	Set 5	Total
8 Sep	Cuba	3–2	Russia	7–15	15–11	15–4	2–15	15–11	54–56
8 Sep	Brazil	3–0	Japan	15–13	15–12	15–8			45–33
9 Sep	Japan	3–1	Russia	4–15	15–10	15–8	15–4		49–37
9 Sep	Brazil	3–1	Cuba	15–12	15–13	11–15	15–10		56–50
10 Sep	Cuba	3–1	Japan	15–4	16–14	4–15	15–6		50–39
10 Sep	Brazil	3–1	Russia	14–16	15–5	15–7	15–7		59–35

==== Group H ====
- Venue: Beijing, China

Date		Score		Set 1	Set 2	Set 3	Set 4	Set 5	Total
8 Sep	United States	3–2	South Korea	8–15	9–15	15–7	15–9	15–9	62–55
8 Sep	China	3–0	Germany	15–12	15–9	15–3			45–24
9 Sep	United States	3–1	Germany	15–9	15–8	9–15	15–8		54–40
9 Sep	China	3–1	South Korea	10–15	15–11	15–8	15–3		55–37
10 Sep	South Korea	3–0	Germany	15–12	15–1	15–8			45–21
10 Sep	United States	3–1	China	7–15	15–7	15–8	15–9		52–39

== Final round ==
- Venue: Shanghai, China

Date		Score		Set 1	Set 2	Set 3	Set 4	Set 5	Total
15 Sep	United States	3–1	Cuba	15–13	11–15	15–10	16–14		57–52
15 Sep	Brazil	3–1	China	15–4	12–15	15–12	15–9		57–40
16 Sep	Brazil	3–1	Cuba	14–16	15–2	15–11	15–13		59–42
16 Sep	United States	3–0	China	16–14	15–11	15–12			46–37
17 Sep	United States	3–2	Brazil	15–9	15–10	4–15	5–15	15–12	54–61
17 Sep	Cuba	3–1	China	11–15	16–14	15–8	16–14		58–51

=== Final ranking ===
Pos	Team	Pld	W	L	Pts	SW	SL	SR	SPW	SPL	SPR
1	United States	3	3	0	6	9	3	3.000	157	150	1.047
2	Brazil	3	2	1	5	8	5	1.600	177	136	1.301
3	Cuba	3	1	2	4	5	7	0.714	152	167	0.910
4	China	3	0	3	3	2	9	0.222	128	161	0.795

== Final standings ==
1995 FIVB World Grand Prix winners

United States
First title

Place	Team
1st place, gold medalist(s)	United States
2nd place, silver medalist(s)	Brazil
3rd place, bronze medalist(s)	Cuba
4	China
5	South Korea
6	Russia
7	Japan
8	Germany

== Individual awards ==
- Most valuable player: Tara Cross-Battle (USA)
- Best scorer : Tara Cross-Battle (USA)
- Best spiker: Tara Cross-Battle (USA)
- Best blocker: Ana Ibis Fernandez (CUB)
- Best server: Yevgeniya Estes (RUS)
- Best receiver: Teee Sanders (USA)
- Best digger: Li Yan (CHN)
- Best setter: Lori Endicott (USA)
- Best outside spikers
  (United States) Tara Cross-Battle
  (Russia) Yevgeniya Estes
- Best middle blocker
  (Cuba) Ana Ibis Fernandez
  (United States) Elaina Oden
- Best opposite spiker
  (Russia) Elena Batukhtina

== Statistics leaders ==
- Only players whose teams advanced to the semifinals are ranked.

Best scorers

Rank	Name	Points
1	(United States) CROSS BATTLE Tara	136
2	(Cuba) FERNANDEZ Ana Ibis	133
3	(Cuba) LUIS Mireya	129
4	(Russia) ARTAMONOVA Evguenia	125
5	(Brazil) MOSER Ana Beatriz	118
6	(Cuba) CARVAJAL Magalys	107
7	(China) SUN Yue	98
8	(China) LI Yan	93
9	(Brazil) CUNHA Marcia	91
10	(United States) WILLIAMS Tonya	88

Best spikers

Rank	Name	%Eff
1	(United States) CROSS BATTLE Tara	39.62
2	(Russia) ARTAMONOVA Evguenia	35.34
3	(Cuba) LUIS Mireya	33.17
4	(Brazil) ALVAREZ Ana Ida	31.82
5	(United States) ODEN Elaina	30.85

Best blockers

Rank	Name	Avg
1	(Cuba) FERNANDEZ Ana Ibis	1.19
2	(Cuba) CARVAJAL Magalys	1.05
3	(United States) ODEN Elaina	0.97
4	(Russia) OGUIENKO Valentina	0.92
5	(Russia) ARTAMONOVA Evguenia	0.91

Best servers

Rank	Name	Avg
1	(Russia) ARTAMONOVA Evguenia	0.42
2	(Brazil) MOSER Ana Beatriz	0.38
3	(United States) CROSS BATTLE Tara	0.36
4	(Cuba) FERNANDEZ Ana Ibis	0.34
5	(China) WANG Zilling	0.31

Best diggers

Rank	Name	Avg
1	(China) LI Yan	2.89
2	(Cuba) LUIS Mireya	2.65
3	(China) WANG Yi	2.31

Best receivers

Rank	Name	%Succ
1	(United States) CROSS BATTLE Tara	73.4
2	(Cuba) IZQUIERDO Lilia	71.12
3	(China) LI Yan	68.76

Best setters

Rank	Name	Avg	%Succ
1	(United States) ENDICOTT Lori	9.16	52.13
2	(Brazil) VENTURINI Fernanda	9.02	55.78
3	(Russia) LITENCHTEIN Maria	5.91	48.23
4	(China) HE Qi	5.44	49.21
5	(Cuba) COSTA Marlenis	5.13	52.11
