= Zhou Hong (volleyball) =

Chinese volleyball player

Personal information
- Born: 10 March 1966 (age 60)
- Height: 183 cm (6 ft 0 in)

Volleyball information
- Position: Opposite
- Number: 3 (1988); 4 (1989, 1991–1992); 15 (1990)

National team
- Years: Team
- 1988–1992: China
Honours
Women's volleyball
Representing China
Olympic Games
Bronze medal – third place	1988 Seoul	Team
World Championship
Silver medal – second place	1990 China	Team
FIVB World Cup
Silver medal – second place	1991 Japan
Bronze medal – third place	1989 Japan
Asian Games
Gold medal – first place	1990 Beijing	Team

Zhou Hong (simplified Chinese: 赵红; traditional Chinese: 趙紅; pinyin: Zhào Hóng, born 10 March 1966) is a Chinese former volleyball player who competed in the 1988 Summer Olympics in Seoul and the 1992 Summer Olympics in Barcelona. She also won a silver medal with the Chinese team at the 1990 FIVB World Championship in China.
