= Marina Kumysh =

Soviet volleyball player (born 1964)

Marina Yevgenyevna Kumysh

Personal information
- Full name: Marina Yevgenyevna Kumysh
- Born: 27 December 1964 (age 61); Moscow, Soviet Union
- Height: 1.84 m (6 ft 0 in)

Volleyball information
- Position: Outside hitter
- Number: 4

National team
1985–1988	Soviet Union
Honours
Women's volleyball
Representing the Soviet Union
Olympic Games
Gold medal – first place	1988 Seoul	Team
FIVB World Cup
Bronze medal – third place	1985 Japan
European Championships
Gold medal – first place	1985 Netherlands
Silver medal – second place	1987 Belgium

Marina Yevgenyevna Kumysh (Russian: Марина Евгеньевна Кумыш) (born 27 December 1964) is a Soviet former competitive volleyball player and Olympic gold medalist.
