= Olga Krivosheyeva =

Soviet volleyball player

Personal information
- Full name: Olga Yuryevna Krivosheyeva
- Nickname: Ольга Юрьевна Кривошеева
- Nationality: Russian
- Born: 15 May 1961 (age 65); Alma-Ata, Kazakh SSR, Soviet Union
- Height: 1.80 m (5 ft 11 in)

Volleyball information
- Position: Setter
- Number: 12

National team
1984–1988	Soviet Union
Honours
Women's volleyball
Representing the Soviet Union
Olympic Games
Gold medal – first place	1988 Seoul	Team
FIVB World Cup
Bronze medal – third place	1985 Japan
Goodwill Games
Gold medal – first place	1986 Moscow
Friendship Games
Silver medal – second place	1984 Varna
European Championships
Gold medal – first place	1985 Arnhem
Silver medal – second place	1987 Ghent

Olga Yuryevna Krivosheyeva (Russian: Ольга Юрьевна Кривошеева, born 15 May 1961) is a Russian former competitive volleyball player who represented the Soviet Union. She won a gold medal with the Soviet women's national volleyball team in the 1988 Summer Olympics in Seoul, South Korea.
