= Liane Sato =

American volleyball player

Personal information
- Born: Liane Lissa Sato; September 9, 1964 (age 62); Santa Monica, California, U.S.
- Height: 5 ft 4 in (163 cm)
- Education: San Diego State University

Volleyball information
- Position: Setter (college); Defensive specialist (national team)
- Number: 14 (national team)

National team
1988–1992	United States
Medal record
Women's volleyball
Representing the United States
Olympic Games
Bronze medal – third place	1992 Barcelona	Team
World Championship
Bronze medal – third place	1990 China	Team

Liane Lissa Sato (born September 9, 1964) is a retired female volleyball player from the United States and two-time Olympian. Sato won the bronze medal with the United States national team at the 1992 Summer Olympics in Barcelona. She also competed at the 1988 Summer Olympics in Seoul, where she finished in seventh place. She was a defensive specialist with the national team.

Sato was inducted into the Southern California Indoor Volleyball Hall of Fame in 2019.

== High school ==
Sato played volleyball at Santa Monica High School in Santa Monica, California and led her team to the state title in 1981.

== College ==
Sato was a setter at San Diego State University, and was an All-American in 1986.

Sato was inducted into the San Diego State Hall of Fame in 2012.

== Personal life ==
Sato's brother, Eric, played volleyball with the United States men's national team in both the 1988 and 1992 Summer Olympics, capturing a gold medal in 1988 and a bronze medal in 1992.

Sato now teaches and coaches volleyball at her alma mater, Santa Monica High School.

== Awards ==
- All-American — 1986
- FIVB World Championship bronze medal — 1990
- Olympic bronze medal — 1992
- San Diego State Hall of Fame — 2012
- Southern California Indoor Volleyball Hall of Fame — 2019
