= Tatyana Kraynova =

Soviet volleyball player (born 1967)

Valeri Kalachikhin

Personal information
- Full name: Tatyana Aleksandrovna Kraynova (-Romashkan)
- Nickname: Татьяна Александровна Крайнова
- Nationality: Russian
- Born: 7 June 1967 (age 59); Leningrad, Soviet Union
- Height: 1.85 m (6 ft 1 in)

Volleyball information
- Position: Outside hitter
- Number: 8

National team
1988	Soviet Union
Honours
Women's volleyball
Representing the Soviet Union
Olympic Games
Gold medal – first place	1988 Seoul	Team

Tatyana Aleksandrovna Kraynova (Russian: Татьяна Александровна Крайнова, born 7 June 1967, in Leningrad) is a former Soviet competitive volleyball player and Olympic gold medalist.
