= Lori Endicott =

American volleyball player (born 1967)

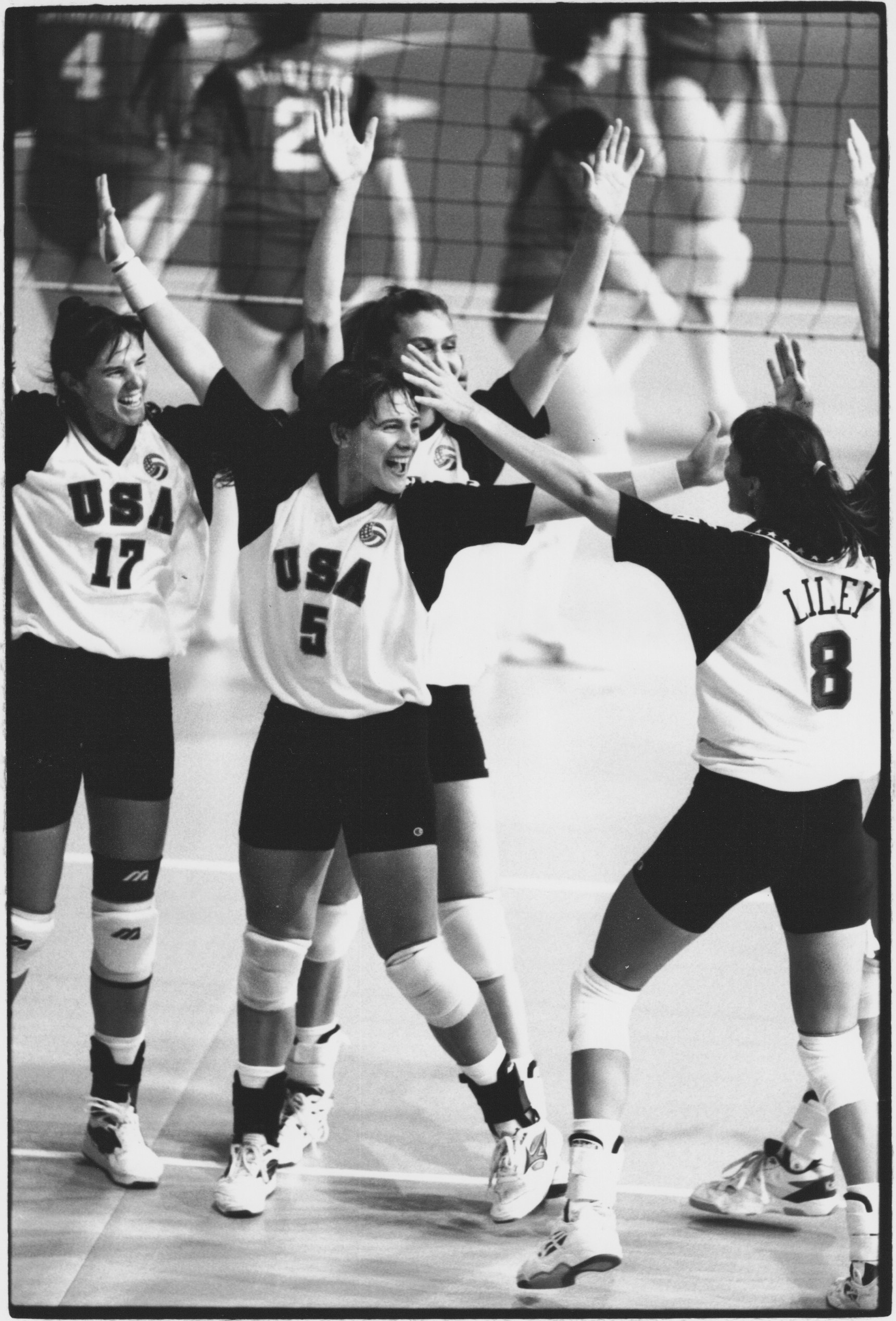

Personal information
- Full name: Lori Ann Endicott
- Born: August 1, 1967 (age 59); Kansas City, Missouri, U.S.
- Height: 5 ft 9 in (1.75 m)
- Education: University of Nebraska–Lincoln

Volleyball information
- Position: Setter
- Number: 5 (national team); 2 (Nebraska)

National team
1989–1996	United States
Medal record
Women's volleyball
Representing the United States
Olympic Games
Bronze medal – third place	1992 Barcelona	Team
World Championship
Bronze medal – third place	1990 China	Team
FIVB World Grand Prix
Gold medal – first place	1995 Shanghai
Pan American Games
Silver medal – second place	1995 Mar del Plata	Team

Lori Ann Endicott (born August 1, 1967) is a retired female volleyball player from the United States. She played at the University of Nebraska–Lincoln and then for the United States national team, winning a bronze medal at the 1992 Summer Olympics in Barcelona.

== High school ==
Endicott attended Willard High School in Willard, Missouri. She helped the volleyball team win the 1981 Missouri state championship, and was an all-conference selection in 1982, 1983, and 1984. Endicott also played basketball and was named to the basketball all-state team in 1984 and 1985.

== College ==
Endicott then played volleyball for the University of Nebraska. She helped the team win four Big Eight Conference titles from 1985 to 1988. In 1986, Nebraska finished second at the NCAA championships. Endicott was named the Big Eight Player of the Year, and was an All-American in 1987 and 1988. She finished her career at Nebraska with school records for assists in a single season, assists in a career, and service aces in a career. Her number was retired in 1992.

== International ==
Endicott joined the United States national team in 1989. In 1990, she was named the outstanding setter at the World Challenge Cup and the FIVB Super Four, and she helped the United States win the bronze medal at the FIVB World Championship. She was then named the best setter at the 1991 NORCECA Zone Championship and the 1992 FIVB Super Four. She helped the United States win the bronze medal and was named best setter at the 1992 Summer Olympics.

In 1993, Endicott was named best setter at the World Championship Qualification Tournament. In 1995, she helped the United States win gold medals at the FIVB World Grand Prix and Canada Cup, and the silver medal at the Pan American Games. She also participated in the 1996 Olympic Games in Atlanta, where she finished in seventh place.

== Personal life ==
Endicott is 5 feet 9 inches (1.75 m) tall. She married Mark Vandersnick in 1993.
