= 1989 Women's European Volleyball Championship =

Tournament details
- Host country: West Germany
- Dates: 2 – 10 September
- Teams: 12
- Venue: Various (in 4 host cities)

Final positions
- Champions: Soviet Union (12th title)

Tournament awards
- MVP: (Soviet Union) Valentina Ogienko

The 1989 Women's European Volleyball Championship was the sixteenth edition of the event, organised by Europe's governing volleyball body, the Confédération Européenne de Volleyball. It was hosted in several cities in West Germany from 2 to 10 September 1989, with the final round held in Stuttgart.

== Participating teams ==
| Team | Method of qualification |
|---|---|
| Bulgaria | Qualification group 1 winners |
| Czechoslovakia | 1987 edition third place |
| East Germany | 1987 edition first place |
| Finland | Qualification group 1 runners-up |
| France | Qualification group 4 runners-up |
| Italy | Qualification group 3 winners |
| Poland | Qualification group 2 runners-up |
| Romania | Qualification group 4 winners |
| Soviet Union | 1987 edition second place |
| Turkey | Qualification group 3 runners-up |
| West Germany | Hosts |
| Yugoslavia | Qualification group 2 winners |

== Format ==
The tournament was played in two different stages. In the first stage, the twelve participants were divided in two groups of six teams each. A single round-robin format was played within each group to determine the teams' group position. The second stage of the tournament consisted of three sets of semifinals to determine the tournament final ranking. The group stage firsts and seconds played the semifinals for 1st to 4th place, group stage thirds and fourths played the 5th to 8th place semifinals and group stage fifths and sixths played the 9th to 12th semifinals. The pairing of the semifinals was made so teams played against the opposite group teams which finished in a different position (1st played against 2nd, 3rd played against 4th and 5th played against 6th).

== Pools composition ==
| Pool A | Pool B |
|---|---|
| Finland | Bulgaria |
| Romania | Czechoslovakia |
| Soviet Union | East Germany |
| Turkey | France |
| West Germany | Italy |
| Yugoslavia | Poland |

== Venues ==
| Pool A | Pool B | Tournament host cities |
| Hamburg | Karlsruhe | Tournament host cities |
| Final round (9th–12th) | Final round (1st–8th) | Tournament host cities |
| Sindelfingen | Stuttgart | Tournament host cities |

== Preliminary round ==
=== Pool A ===
- venue location: Hamburg, West Germany

| Pos | Team | Pld | W | L | Pts | SW | SL | SR | SPW | SPL | SPR | Qualification |
|---|---|---|---|---|---|---|---|---|---|---|---|---|
| 1 | Soviet Union | 5 | 5 | 0 | 10 | 15 | 0 | MAX | 229 | 124 | 1.847 | 1st–4th semifinals |
| 2 | Romania | 5 | 4 | 1 | 9 | 12 | 6 | 2.000 | 247 | 210 | 1.176 | 1st–4th semifinals |
| 3 | West Germany | 5 | 3 | 2 | 8 | 11 | 6 | 1.833 | 225 | 173 | 1.301 | 5th–8th semifinals |
| 4 | Yugoslavia | 5 | 2 | 3 | 7 | 6 | 9 | 0.667 | 160 | 189 | 0.847 | 5th–8th semifinals |
| 5 | Turkey | 5 | 1 | 4 | 6 | 4 | 13 | 0.308 | 175 | 236 | 0.742 | 9th–12th semifinals |
| 6 | Finland | 5 | 0 | 5 | 5 | 1 | 15 | 0.067 | 127 | 231 | 0.550 | 9th–12th semifinals |

| Date | | Score | | Set 1 | Set 2 | Set 3 | Set 4 | Set 5 | Total | Report |
|---|---|---|---|---|---|---|---|---|---|---|
| 2 Sep | Yugoslavia | 0–3 | Romania | 4–15 | 4–15 | 14–16 | | | 22–46 | Report |
| 2 Sep | West Germany | 3–0 | Finland | 15–6 | 15–11 | 15–8 | | | 45–25 | Report |
| 2 Sep | Soviet Union | 3–0 | Turkey | 15–5 | 15–9 | 15–8 | | | 45–22 | Report |
| 3 Sep | Yugoslavia | 0–3 | West Germany | 3–15 | 5–15 | 3–15 | | | 11–45 | Report |
| 3 Sep | Soviet Union | 3–0 | Romania | 15–7 | 16–14 | 16–14 | | | 47–35 | Report |
| 3 Sep | Turkey | 3–1 | Finland | 5–15 | 15–9 | 16–14 | 15–8 | | 51–46 | Report |
| 4 Sep | Yugoslavia | 0–3 | Soviet Union | 12–15 | 15–17 | 8–15 | | | 35–47 | Report |
| 4 Sep | Romania | 3–0 | Finland | 15–9 | 15–10 | 15–6 | | | 45–25 | Report |
| 4 Sep | West Germany | 3–0 | Turkey | 15–7 | 15–10 | 15–8 | | | 45–25 | Report |
| 6 Sep | Yugoslavia | 3–0 | Turkey | 15–5 | 16–14 | 15–12 | | | 46–31 | Report |
| 6 Sep | Soviet Union | 3–0 | Finland | 15–3 | 15–1 | 15–7 | | | 45–11 | Report |
| 6 Sep | Romania | 3–2 | West Germany | 15–13 | 8–15 | 15–13 | 13–15 | 16–14 | 67–70 | Report |
| 7 Sep | Yugoslavia | 3–0 | Finland | 15–10 | 15–7 | 15–3 | | | 45–20 | Report |
| 7 Sep | Romania | 3–1 | Turkey | 15–12 | 9–15 | 15–7 | 15–12 | | 54–46 | Report |
| 7 Sep | Soviet Union | 3–0 | West Germany | 15–9 | 15–7 | 15–4 | | | 45–20 | Report |

=== Pool B ===
- venue location: Karlsruhe, West Germany

| Pos | Team | Pld | W | L | Pts | SW | SL | SR | SPW | SPL | SPR | Qualification |
|---|---|---|---|---|---|---|---|---|---|---|---|---|
| 1 | East Germany | 5 | 5 | 0 | 10 | 15 | 3 | 5.000 | 257 | 163 | 1.577 | 1st–4th semifinals |
| 2 | Italy | 5 | 3 | 2 | 8 | 10 | 7 | 1.429 | 226 | 196 | 1.153 | 1st–4th semifinals |
| 3 | Czechoslovakia | 5 | 3 | 2 | 8 | 11 | 9 | 1.222 | 257 | 231 | 1.113 | 5th–8th semifinals |
| 4 | Bulgaria | 5 | 3 | 2 | 8 | 10 | 9 | 1.111 | 243 | 225 | 1.080 | 5th–8th semifinals |
| 5 | Poland | 5 | 1 | 4 | 6 | 5 | 13 | 0.385 | 193 | 253 | 0.763 | 9th–12th semifinals |
| 6 | France | 5 | 0 | 5 | 5 | 5 | 15 | 0.333 | 182 | 290 | 0.628 | 9th–12th semifinals |

| Date | | Score | | Set 1 | Set 2 | Set 3 | Set 4 | Set 5 | Total | Report |
|---|---|---|---|---|---|---|---|---|---|---|
| 2 Sep | Bulgaria | 3–1 | France | 15–5 | 15–10 | 13–15 | 15–2 | | 58–32 | Report |
| 2 Sep | Italy | 3–0 | Czechoslovakia | 15–9 | 15–11 | 15–13 | | | 45–33 | Report |
| 2 Sep | East Germany | 3–0 | Poland | 15–6 | 15–7 | 15–9 | | | 45–22 | Report |
| 3 Sep | Italy | 3–1 | France | 15–10 | 14–16 | 15–2 | 15–8 | | 59–36 | Report |
| 3 Sep | Czechoslovakia | 3–1 | Poland | 15–12 | 15–12 | 12–15 | 15–10 | | 57–49 | Report |
| 3 Sep | East Germany | 3–0 | Bulgaria | 15–11 | 15–12 | 15–9 | | | 45–32 | Report |
| 4 Sep | Italy | 3–0 | Poland | 15–9 | 15–5 | 15–10 | | | 45–24 | Report |
| 4 Sep | Czechoslovakia | 3–1 | Bulgaria | 15–3 | 15–8 | 12–15 | 15–10 | | 57–36 | Report |
| 4 Sep | East Germany | 3–1 | France | 15–6 | 15–4 | 14–16 | 15–3 | | 59–29 | Report |
| 6 Sep | East Germany | 3–0 | Italy | 15–11 | 15–13 | 15–4 | | | 45–28 | Report |
| 6 Sep | Bulgaria | 3–1 | Poland | 15–3 | 14–16 | 15–13 | 15–10 | | 59–42 | Report |
| 6 Sep | Czechoslovakia | 3–1 | France | 15–9 | 13–15 | 15–4 | 15–10 | | 58–38 | Report |
| 7 Sep | Bulgaria | 3–1 | Italy | 15–12 | 16–14 | 12–15 | 15–8 | | 58–49 | Report |
| 7 Sep | East Germany | 3–2 | Czechoslovakia | 15–6 | 15–4 | 10–15 | 8–15 | 15–12 | 63–52 | Report |
| 7 Sep | Poland | 3–1 | France | 15–9 | 15–11 | 11–15 | 15–12 | | 56–47 | Report |

== Final round ==
=== 9th–12th place ===
- Pools A and B fifth and sixth positions play each other.
- venue location: Sindelfingen, West Germany

Semifinals
9 Sep
Poland | 3
Finland | 0
9 Sep
France | 3
Turkey | 1

9th place
10 Sep
Poland | 3
France | 2
11th place
10 Sep
Finland | 1
Turkey | 3

==== 9th–12th semifinals ====
| Date | | Score | | Set 1 | Set 2 | Set 3 | Set 4 | Set 5 | Total | Report |
|---|---|---|---|---|---|---|---|---|---|---|
| 9 Sep | France | 3–1 | Turkey | 15–5 | 15–8 | 14–16 | 15–11 | | 59–40 | Report |
| 9 Sep | Poland | 3–0 | Finland | 15–7 | 15–2 | 15–3 | | | 45–12 | Report |

==== 11th place match ====
| Date | | Score | | Set 1 | Set 2 | Set 3 | Set 4 | Set 5 | Total | Report |
|---|---|---|---|---|---|---|---|---|---|---|
| 10 Sep | Turkey | 3–1 | Finland | 15–6 | 15–8 | 12–15 | 16–14 | | 58–43 | Report |

==== 9th place match ====
| Date | | Score | | Set 1 | Set 2 | Set 3 | Set 4 | Set 5 | Total | Report |
|---|---|---|---|---|---|---|---|---|---|---|
| 10 Sep | Poland | 3–2 | France | 15–12 | 12–15 | 17–15 | 7–15 | 15–13 | 66–70 | Report |

=== 5th–8th place ===
- Pools A and B third and fourth positions play each other.
- venue location: Stuttgart, West Germany

Semifinals
9 Sep
Czechoslovakia | 3
Yugoslavia | 1
9 Sep
West Germany | 3
Bulgaria | 1

5th place
10 Sep
Czechoslovakia | 3
West Germany | 0
7th place
10 Sep
Yugoslavia | 0
Bulgaria | 3

==== 5th–8th semifinals ====
| Date | | Score | | Set 1 | Set 2 | Set 3 | Set 4 | Set 5 | Total | Report |
|---|---|---|---|---|---|---|---|---|---|---|
| 9 Sep | Yugoslavia | 1–3 | Czechoslovakia | 4–15 | 12–15 | 17–15 | 9–15 | | 42–60 | Report |
| 9 Sep | West Germany | 3–1 | Bulgaria | 12–15 | 15–9 | 16–14 | 15–6 | | 58–44 | Report |

==== 7th place match ====
| Date | | Score | | Set 1 | Set 2 | Set 3 | Set 4 | Set 5 | Total | Report |
|---|---|---|---|---|---|---|---|---|---|---|
| 10 Sep | Yugoslavia | 0–3 | Bulgaria | 11–15 | 9–15 | 3–15 | | | 23–45 | Report |

==== 5th place match ====
| Date | | Score | | Set 1 | Set 2 | Set 3 | Set 4 | Set 5 | Total | Report |
|---|---|---|---|---|---|---|---|---|---|---|
| 10 Sep | Czechoslovakia | 3–0 | West Germany | 15–4 | 16–14 | 15–7 | | | 46–25 | Report |

=== Final ===
- Pools A and B first and second positions play each other.
- venue location: Stuttgart, West Germany

Semifinals
9 Sep
Soviet Union | 3
Italy | 0
9 Sep
East Germany | 3
Romania | 0

Final
10 Sep
Soviet Union | 3
East Germany | 1
3rd place
10 Sep
Italy | 3
Romania | 0

==== Semifinals ====
| Date | | Score | | Set 1 | Set 2 | Set 3 | Set 4 | Set 5 | Total | Report |
|---|---|---|---|---|---|---|---|---|---|---|
| 9 Sep | Soviet Union | 3–0 | Italy | 15–10 | 15–7 | 15–8 | | | 45–25 | Report |
| 9 Sep | East Germany | 3–0 | Romania | 17–15 | 15–6 | 15–4 | | | 47–25 | Report |

==== 3rd place match ====
| Date | | Score | | Set 1 | Set 2 | Set 3 | Set 4 | Set 5 | Total | Report |
|---|---|---|---|---|---|---|---|---|---|---|
| 10 Sep | Italy | 3–0 | Romania | 15–5 | 15–6 | 15–3 | | | 45–14 | Report |

==== Final ====
| Date | | Score | | Set 1 | Set 2 | Set 3 | Set 4 | Set 5 | Total | Report |
|---|---|---|---|---|---|---|---|---|---|---|
| 10 Sep | Soviet Union | 3–1 | East Germany | 8–15 | 16–14 | 15–13 | 15–13 | | 54–55 | Report |

== Final ranking ==
| Place | Team |
|---|---|
| 1st place, gold medalist(s) | Soviet Union |
| 2nd place, silver medalist(s) | East Germany |
| 3rd place, bronze medalist(s) | Italy |
| 4. | Romania |
| 5. | Czechoslovakia |
| 6. | West Germany |
| 7. | Bulgaria |
| 8. | Yugoslavia |
| 9. | Poland |
| 10. | France |
| 11. | Turkey |
| 12. | Finland |

1989 Women's European champions

Soviet Union
Twelfth title

Team Roster
Irina Kirillova, Valentina Ogienko, Elena Chebukina, Tatyana Sidorenko, Irina Ilchenko, Svetlana Korytova, Irina Shcherbakova, Elena Batoukhtina, Marina Vyalitsyna, Inna Dashuk, Galina Lebedeva, and Olga Tolmacheva.
Head coach: Nikolay Karpol.

== Individual awards ==
- MVP: Valentina Ogienko (URS)
- Best spiker: Irina Ilchenko (URS)
- Best server: Gabriela Dumitrescu (ROU)
- Best blocker: Grit Naumann (GDR)
- Best setter: Manuela Benelli (ITA)
- Best receiver: Susanne Lahme (GDR)
- Best digger: Liliana Bernardi (ITA)
