= Sonia Ayaucán =

Peruvian volleyball player

Personal information
- Full name: Sonia Beatriz Ayaucán Ciudad
- Born: 1 April 1969 (age 57); Chincha, Peru
- Height: 1.76 m (5 ft 9 in)

Volleyball information
- Position: Outside hitter
- Number: 1

Career
Years	Teams
1993–1994; 1994–1995	Cristal - Bancoper; Recreativa

National team
1986–1994	Peru
Medal record
Women's volleyball
Representing Peru
World Championship
Bronze medal – third place	1986 Czechoslovakia	Team
Goodwill Games
Silver medal – second place	1986 Moscow
Pan American Games
Silver medal – second place	1987 Indianapolis	Team
South American Championship
Gold medal – first place	1987 Montevideo
Gold medal – first place	1989 Curitiba
Gold medal – first place	1993 Cusco

Sonia Beatriz Ayaucán Ciudad (born 1 April 1969), also known as Sonia Ayaucán, is a Peruvian former volleyball player who was part of the Peruvian women's national volleyball team. Ayaucán was a member of the Peruvian team that won the bronze medal at the 1986 FIVB World Championship in Czechoslovakia. Four years later, she was selected as the best receiver at the 1990 FIVB World Championship in China. She was an outside hitter.

== Clubs ==
- Cristal - Bancoper (1993–1994)
- Recreativa (1994–1995)
