= Nancy Celis =

German volleyball player (born 1966)

Personal information
- Nationality: German
- Born: 9 October 1966 (age 58); Lier, Belgium
- Height: 187 cm (6 ft 2 in)

Sport
- Sport: Volleyball

Nancy Celis (born 9 October 1966) is a German former volleyball player. She competed in the women's tournament at the 1996 Summer Olympics.
