= Olga Shkurnova =

Soviet volleyball player (born 1962)

Personal information
- Full name: Olga Dmitriyevna Shkurnova (Pozdnyakova-)
- Nickname: Ольга Дмитриевна Шкурнова
- Nationality: Ukrainian
- Born: 23 March 1962 (age 64); Odessa, Ukrainian SSR, Soviet Union
- Height: 1.80 m (5 ft 11 in)

Volleyball information
- Position: Outside hitter
- Number: 9

National team
1982–1988	Soviet Union
Honours
Women's volleyball
Representing the Soviet Union
Olympic Games
Gold medal – first place	1988 Seoul	Team
Friendship Games
Silver medal – second place	1984 Varna
European Championship
Silver medal – second place	1983 East Germany

Olga Dmitrievna Shkurnova (Russian: Ольга Дмитриевна Шкурнова, born 23 March 1962, in Odessa) is a former Soviet competitive volleyball player and Olympic gold medalist. Shkurnova won a gold medal with the Soviet team in the 1988 Summer Olympics in Seoul.
