= Nam Soon-ok =

South Korean volleyball player (born 1969)

Personal information
- Nationality: South Korean
- Born: 16 February 1969 (age 57)

Sport
- Sport: Volleyball

Nam Soon-ok (born 16 February 1969) is a South Korean volleyball player. She competed in the women's tournament at the 1988 Summer Olympics.
