= Park Mi-hee =

South Korean volleyball player (born 1963)

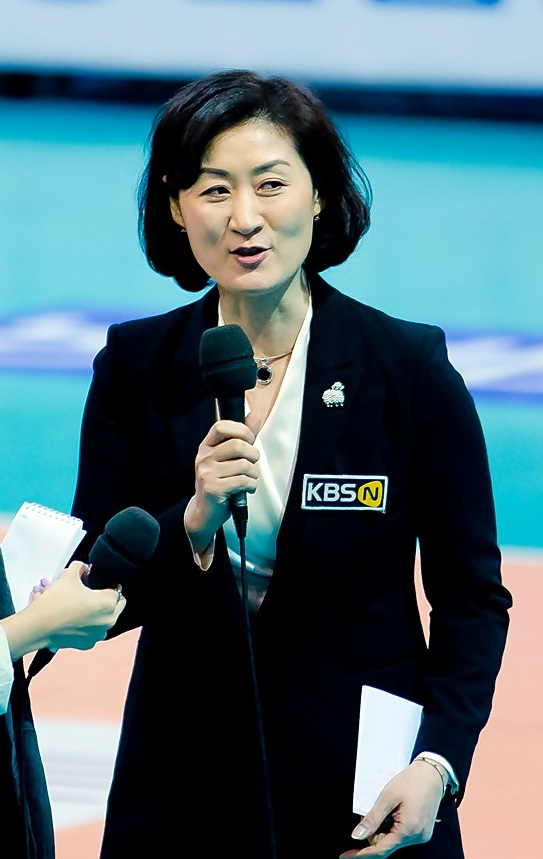
Park Mi-hee as a KBS N commentator in 2013.

Park Mi-hee (Korean: 박미희; RR: Bak Mihui, born 10 December 1963) is a South Korean volleyball player, and coach.

She played at the 1984 Summer Olympics, 1988 Summer Olympics, 1982 Asian Games, 1990 Asian Games, and 1990 FIVB Volleyball Women's World Championship.

She played for Midopa. She coached for Incheon Heungkuk Life Pink Spiders.
