= Li Yueming =

Chinese volleyball player

Personal information
- Nationality: Chinese
- Born: 24 January 1968 (age 58); Shanghai, People's Republic of China
- Hometown: Shanghai
- Height: 1.98 m (6 ft 6 in)

Volleyball information
- Position: Middle blocker
- Number: 15

National team
1987–1993	China
Honours
Women's volleyball
Representing China
Olympic Games
Bronze medal – third place	1988 Seoul	Team
World Championship
Silver medal – second place	1990 China	Team
FIVB World Cup
Bronze medal – third place	1989 Japan
Silver medal – second place	1991 Japan
FIVB World Grand Prix
Silver medal – second place	1993 Hong Kong
Asian Games
Gold medal – first place	1990 Beijing	Team

Li Yueming (Chinese: 李月明; pinyin: Lǐ Yuèmíng, born 24 January 1968) is a Chinese former volleyball player who won a bronze medal in the 1988 Summer Olympics in Seoul and competed at the 1992 Summer Olympics in Barcelona. She also won a silver medal with the Chinese team at the 1990 FIVB World Championship in China.
