= Li Guojun =

Chinese volleyball player

Personal information
- Nationality: Chinese
- Born: 21 March 1966 (age 60); Shanghai, China
- Height: 181 cm (5 ft 11 in)

Volleyball information
- Number: 2 (1987-1989, 1991-1992); 5 (1990)

National team
1987–1992	China
Honours
Women's volleyball
Representing China
Olympic Games
Bronze medal – third place	1988 Seoul	Team
World Championship
Silver medal – second place	1990 China	Team
FIVB World Cup
Bronze medal – third place	1989 Japan
Silver medal – second place	1991 Japan
Asian Games
Gold medal – first place	1990 Beijing	Team

Li Guojun (Chinese: 李国君; pinyin: Lǐ Guójūn, born 21 March 1966) is a Chinese former volleyball player who competed in the 1988 Summer Olympics in Seoul and the 1992 Summer Olympics in Barcelona.
