= Motoko Obayashi =

Japanese volleyball player

Personal information
- Born: 15 June 1967 (age 59); Kodaira, Tokyo, Japan
- Height: 1.82 m (6 ft 0 in)

Volleyball information
- Position: Outside hitter / Opposite
- Number: 10 (1988); 5 (1992); 2 (1996)

National team
1985–1996	Japan
Honours
Women's volleyball
Representing Japan
Goodwill Games
Bronze medal – third place	1994 Saint Petersburg	Team
Asian Games
Bronze medal – third place	1990 Beijing	Team
Bronze medal – third place	1994 Hiroshima	Team

Motoko Obayashi (大林 素子, Ōbayashi Motoko; born 15 June 1967) is a retired volleyball player from Japan who competed in three consecutive Summer Olympics, starting in 1988. She won a bronze medal with the Japanese team at the 1994 Goodwill Games in Saint Petersburg.

Obayashi took part in the torch relay of the 2020 Summer Olympics in Tokyo.

== Personal life ==
Obayashi released a musical single under the solo project named Deka Moni in 2001.
