= Tatyana Sidorenko =

Soviet, Russian and Croatian volleyball player (born 1966)

Personal information
- Full name: Tatyana Ivanovna Sidorenko
- Born: 4 July 1966 (age 60); Moscow, Soviet Union
- Height: 1.85 m (6 ft 1 in)

Volleyball information
- Position: Outside hitter
- Number: 6

Career
Years	Teams
1982–1991; 1991–1992; 1992–1993; 1993–1994; 1994–1995; 1995–1997; 1997–1998; 1998–2000; 2000–2002	(Soviet Union) CSKA Moscow (Croatia) Mladost Zagreb (Italy) Preca Brummel Cislago (Spain) UCAM Voley Murcia (Italy) Impresem Agrigento (Italy) Volley Spezzano (Croatia) ŽOK Dubrovnik (Turkey) Beşiktaş (Italy) Clai Imola

National team
1985–1991; 1992; 1996–1998	Soviet Union; Unified Team; Croatia
Honours

Women's volleyball
Representing Soviet Union
Olympic Games
Gold medal – first place	1988 Seoul	Team
World Championship
Gold medal – first place	1990 China	Team
World Cup
Silver medal – second place	1989 Japan
Bronze medal – third place	1985 Japan
Bronze medal – third place	1991 Japan
Goodwill Games
Gold medal – first place	1986 Moscow
Gold medal – first place	1990 Seattle
European Championship
Gold medal – first place	1985 Netherlands
Gold medal – first place	1989 West Germany
Gold medal – first place	1991 Italy
European Junior Championship
Gold medal – first place	1986 Bulgaria	Under-19
Representing Unified Team
Olympic Games
Silver medal – second place	1992 Barcelona	Team
Representing Croatia
European Championship
Silver medal – second place	1997 Czech Republic

Tatyana Ivanovna Sidorenko (Russian: Татьяна Ивановна Сидоренко; born 4 July 1966) is a former Soviet, Russian and Croatian competitive volleyball player and Olympic gold medalist. Sidorenko won a gold medal with the Soviet team at the 1988 Summer Olympics in Seoul and a silver medal with the Unified Team at the 1992 Summer Olympics in Barcelona.

In the 1990s, Sidorenko played for the Croatia women's national volleyball team.
