= Valentina Ogiyenko =

Russian volleyball player

Personal information
- Full name: Valentina Vitalyevna Ogiyenko
- Born: 26 May 1965 (age 61) Krasnodar, Russian SFSR, Soviet Union
- Height: 1.82 m (5 ft 11 1/2 in)
- Weight: 72 kg (159 lb)

Volleyball information
- Position: Middle blocker
- Number: 1 (national team)

Career
- Years: Team
- 1983–1991 1991–1992 1995–1999: Uralochka Ekaterinburgo; Mladost Zagreb; Uralochka Ekaterinburgo

National team
- Years: Team
- 1983–1991 1992 1992–1998: Soviet Union; Unified Team; Russia
Honours

Women's volleyball
Representing Soviet Union
Olympic Games
Gold medal – first place	1988 Seoul	Team
World Championship
Gold medal – first place	1990 China	Team
World Cup
Silver medal – second place	1989 Japan
Bronze medal – third place	1985 Japan
Bronze medal – third place	1991 Japan
Goodwill Games
Gold medal – first place	1986 Moscow
Gold medal – first place	1990 Seattle
Friendship Games
Silver medal – second place	1984 Varna
European Championship
Gold medal – first place	1985 Netherlands
Gold medal – first place	1989 West Germany
Gold medal – first place	1991 Italy
Silver medal – second place	1983 East Germany
Silver medal – second place	1987 Belgium
Representing Unified Team
Olympic Games
Silver medal – second place	1992 Barcelona	Team
Representing Russia
World Championship
Bronze medal – third place	1994 Brazil	Team
Bronze medal – third place	1998 Japan	Team
World Grand Champions Cup
Bronze medal – third place	1993 Japan
Goodwill Games
Gold medal – first place	1994 Saint Petersburg	Team
FIVB World Grand Prix
Silver medal – second place	1998 Hong Kong
European Championship
Gold medal – first place	1993 Czech Republic
Bronze medal – third place	1995 Netherlands

Valentina Vitalyevna Ogiyenko (Russian: Валенти́на Вита́льевна Огие́нко, born 26 May 1965) is a Russian former volleyball player and three-time Olympian who was a member of the Soviet Union women's national volleyball team that won the gold medal at the 1988 Summer Olympics in Seoul. She was selected as the Best Player of the Year by the International Volleyball Federation in 1989.

In 2019, Ogiyenko was inducted into the International Volleyball Hall of Fame.
