= Irina Ilchenko =

Russian volleyball player (born 1968)

Personal information
- Full name: Irina Anatolyevna Ilchenko
- Nickname: Ирина Анатольевна Ильченко
- Born: 3 August 1968 (age 58); Ivanovo, Russian SFSR, Soviet Union
- Height: 1.91 m (6 ft 3 in)
- Weight: 73 kg (161 lb)

Volleyball information
- Position: Outside hitter
- Number: 5

Career
Years	Teams
1984–1991; 1992–1993; 1993–1994; 1995–1998; 1998–2001	(Soviet Union) Uralochka Ekaterinburgo (Italy) Impresem Agrigento (Croatia) Mladost Zagreb (Turkey) Galatasaray Istanbul (Turkey) Eczacıbaşı Istanbul

National team
1987–1991; 1992; 1992–1993, 1996	Soviet Union; Unified Team; Russia
Honours

Women's volleyball
Representing Soviet Union
Olympic Games
Gold medal – first place	1988 Seoul	Team
World Championship
Gold medal – first place	1990 China	Team
World Cup
Silver medal – second place	1989 Japan
Bronze medal – third place	1991 Japan
Goodwill Games
Gold medal – first place	1990 Seattle
European Championship
Gold medal – first place	1989 West Germany
Gold medal – first place	1991 Italy
Silver medal – second place	1987 Belgium
European Junior Championship
Gold medal – first place	1986 Bulgaria	Under-19
Representing Unified Team
Olympic Games
Silver medal – second place	1992 Barcelona	Team
Representing Russia
World Grand Champions Cup
Bronze medal – third place	1993 Japan
FIVB World Grand Prix
Bronze medal – third place	1993 Hong Kong
European Championship
Gold medal – first place	1993 Czech Republic

Irina Anatolyevna Ilchenko (Russian: Ирина Анатольевна Ильченко; born 3 August 1968, in Ivanovo), known as Irina Ilchenko or Irina Smirnova, is a retired Russian volleyball player. Born in Yekaterinburg, she competed for the Soviet Union at the 1988 Summer Olympics, the Unified Team at the 1992 Summer Olympics, and Russia at the 1996 Summer Olympics.

She is the mother of the Russian player Ksenia Ilchenko Parubets.
