= Yelena Chebukina =

Soviet, Russian and Croatian volleyball player

Personal information
- Full name: Yelena Vasilyevna Chebukina
- Nationality: Soviet, Russian, Croatian
- Born: 11 October 1965 (age 61) Alma-Ata, Kazakh SSR, Soviet Union
- Height: 1.90 m (6 ft 3 in)
- Weight: 77 kg (170 lb)

Volleyball information
- Position: Middle blocker
- Number: 11

Career
- Years: Team
- 1984–1991 1991–1992 1992–1993 1993–1994 1994–1995 1995–1996 1996–1997 1997–1998 1998–1999 1999–2000 2000–2002: (Soviet Union) ADK Almaty (Croatia) Mladost Zagreb (Italy) Impresem Agrigento (Italy) Pallavolo Matera (Italy) Jogging Volley Altamura (Japan) Ito Yokado (Japan) Denso Airybees (Croatia) ŽOK Dubrovnik (Brazil) Leites Nestlé (Italy) Zanetti Bergamo (Italy) Despar Perugia

National team
- Years: Team
- 1983–1991 1992 1992–1993 1995–2001: Soviet Union; Unified Team; Russia; Croatia
Honours
Women's volleyball
Representing Soviet Union
Olympic Games
Gold medal – first place	1988 Seoul	Team
World Championship
Gold medal – first place	1990 China	Team
World Cup
Silver medal – second place	1989 Japan
Bronze medal – third place	1985 Japan
Bronze medal – third place	1991 Japan
Goodwill Games
Gold medal – first place	1986 Moscow
Gold medal – first place	1990 Seattle
Friendship Games
Silver medal – second place	1984 Varna
European Championship
Gold medal – first place	1985 Netherlands
Gold medal – first place	1989 West Germany
Gold medal – first place	1991 Italy
Silver medal – second place	1983 East Germany
Silver medal – second place	1987 Belgium
Representing Unified Team
Olympic Games
Silver medal – second place	1992 Barcelona	Team
Representing Russia
FIVB World Grand Prix
Bronze medal – third place	1993 Hong Kong
European Championship
Gold medal – first place	1993 Czech Republic
Representing Croatia
European Championship
Silver medal – second place	1995 Netherlands
Silver medal – second place	1997 Czech Republic

Yelena Vasilyevna Chebukina (Russian: Елена Васильевна Чебукина; born 11 October 1965) is a former volleyball player, who was a member of the Soviet national team that won the gold medal at the 1988 Summer Olympics.

In the 1990s, Chebukina played for Russia and then the Croatia women's national volleyball team.

== Club volleyball ==
Chebukina started to play in the Italian Volleyball League in 1992 with Irina Smirnova Ilchenko for Impresem Agrigento, ended third in the regular season. During the season 1993–94 she played for PVF Latte Rugiada Matera. With the team PVF Latte Rugiada Matera she won the European Super Cup in 1993, the Italian Cup and the Italian Championship in 1994. Later on, the following years, she also played for Tradeco Altamura. In 1999 with Foppapedretti Bergamo she won the Italian Super Cup and the Champions League in 2000. She ended her career playing for Despar Perugia from 2000 to 2002.
