= Irina Kirillova =

Soviet and Croatian volleyball player

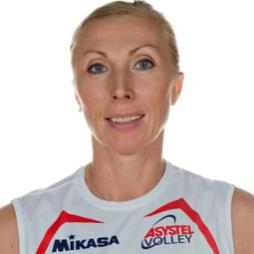

Personal information
- Full name: Irina Vladimirovna Parkhomchuk (Kirillova-)
- Born: 15 May 1965 (age 61); Tula, Russian SFSR, Soviet Union
- Height: 1.80 m (5 ft 11 in)
- Weight: 72 kg (159 lb)
- Spike: 3.00 m (118 in)
- Block: 2.85 m (112 in)

Volleyball information
- Position: Setter
- Number: 7

National team
1982–1990; 1993–1998	Soviet Union; Croatia
Honours
Women's volleyball
Representing Soviet Union
Olympic Games
Gold medal – first place	1988 Seoul	Team
World Championship
Gold medal – first place	1990 China	Team
World Cup
Silver medal – second place	1989 Japan
Goodwill Games
Gold medal – first place	1986 Moscow
Gold medal – first place	1990 Seattle
Friendship Games
Silver medal – second place	1984 Varna
European Championship
Gold medal – first place	1989 West Germany
Silver medal – second place	1983 East Germany
Silver medal – second place	1987 Belgium
European Junior Championship
Gold medal – first place	1982 West Germany	Under-19
Representing Croatia
European Championship
Silver medal – second place	1995 Netherlands
Silver medal – second place	1997 Czech Republic
Mediterranean Games
Gold medal – first place	1993 Languedoc-Roussillon

Irina Vladimirovna Kirillova (Russian: Ирина Владимировна Кириллова, born 15 May 1965), also known as Irina Parkhomchuk, is a retired competitive volleyball player and Olympic gold medalist for the Soviet Union, later competing for Croatia. Kirillova won a gold medal while representing the Soviet Union at the 1988 Summer Olympics in Seoul. She also led the Soviet Union to the gold medal at the 1990 FIVB World Championship in China, and was named the MVP of the tournament. She was a setter.

In the 1990s, Kirillova played for the Croatia women's national volleyball team.

In 2017, Kirillova was inducted into the International Volleyball Hall of Fame.

== Coaching ==
At the 2006 FIVB Volleyball Women's World Championship, Kirillova was the assistant coach to the Russia women's national volleyball team. In 2011, Kirilova became the coach of the Croatian national team, but resigned the position the same year.

== Personal life ==
As of 2017, Kirillova is living in Italy. She is married to Giovanni Caprara, an Italian volleyball coach.

== Clubs ==
- (Soviet Union) Uralochka Sverdlovsk (1980–1990)
- (Socialist Federal Republic of Yugoslavia) / (Croatia) Mladost Zagreb (1990–1994)
- (Italy) Pallavolo Sumirago (1994–1996)
- (Italy) Volley Modena (1996–1997)
- (Brazil) Mappin/Pinheiros (1997–1998)
- (Italy) Foppapedretti Bergamo (1998–1999)
- (Italy) Virtus Reggio Calabria (1999–2001)
- (Italy) Pallavolo Sirio Perugia (2001–2004)
- (Italy) Chieri Volley (2005–2006)
- (Russia) Dinamo Moscow (2008–2009)
- (Italy) Asystel Volley (2009–2010)
- (Russia) Uralochka-NTMK (2012–2012)
