= 1990 FIVB Women's Volleyball World Championship =

Volleyball competition held in China

1990 FIVB Women's World Championship
Tournament details
- Host country: China
- Dates: 22 August – 1 September
- Teams: 16
- Venue: (in 3 host cities)
- Officially opened by: Yang Shangkun

Final positions
- Champions: Soviet Union (5th title)
- Runners-up: China
- Third place: United States
- Fourth place: Cuba

Tournament awards
- MVP: (Soviet Union) Irina Parkhomchuk

The 1990 FIVB Women's World Championship was the eleventh edition of the tournament, organised by the world's governing body, the FIVB. It was held from 22 August to 1 September 1990, in Beijing, Shanghai, and Shenyang, PR China.

== Teams ==
Group A – Beijing

- China
- Egypt
- Italy
- South Korea

Group B – Shanghai

- Cuba
- Japan
- Chinese Taipei
- West Germany

Group C – Shanghai

- Canada
- Netherlands
- Soviet Union
- Peru

Group D – Shenyang

- Argentina
- Brazil
- East Germany
- United States

== Results ==
=== First round ===
==== Pool A ====
Location: Beijing

Pos	Team	Pld	W	L	Pts	SW	SL	SR	SPW	SPL	SPR	Qualification
1	China	3	3	0	6	9	0	MAX	135	35	3.857	Quarterfinals
2	South Korea	3	2	1	5	6	3	2.000	101	69	1.464	Play-offs for quarterfinals
3	Italy	3	1	2	4	3	6	0.500	84	94	0.894	Play-offs for quarterfinals
4	Egypt	3	0	3	3	0	9	0.000	13	135	0.096	13th–16th places

Date		Score		Set 1	Set 2	Set 3	Set 4	Set 5	Total
22 Aug	South Korea	3–0	Egypt	15–0	15–1	15–1			45–2
22 Aug	China	3–0	Italy	15–5	15–1	15–11			45–17
23 Aug	South Korea	3–0	Italy	15–9	15–6	15–7			45–22
23 Aug	China	3–0	Egypt	15–1	15–4	15–2			45–7
24 Aug	Italy	3–0	Egypt	15–4	15–0	15–0			45–4
24 Aug	China	3–0	South Korea	15–4	15–5	15–2			45–11

==== Pool B ====
Location: Shanghai

Pos	Team	Pld	W	L	Pts	SW	SL	SR	SPW	SPL	SPR	Qualification
1	Cuba	3	3	0	6	9	1	9.000	148	94	1.574	Quarterfinals
2	Japan	3	2	1	5	7	4	1.750	144	118	1.220	Play-offs for quarterfinals
3	Chinese Taipei	3	1	2	4	3	7	0.429	114	128	0.891	Play-offs for quarterfinals
4	West Germany	3	0	3	3	2	9	0.222	92	158	0.582	13th–16th places

Date		Score		Set 1	Set 2	Set 3	Set 4	Set 5	Total
22 Aug	Cuba	3–0	Chinese Taipei	15–10	15–9	15–13			45–32
22 Aug	Japan	3–1	West Germany	15–7	12–15	15–5	15–7		57–34
23 Aug	Cuba	3–0	West Germany	15–5	15–7	15–8			45–20
23 Aug	Japan	3–0	Chinese Taipei	15–5	15–8	15–13			45–26
24 Aug	Chinese Taipei	3–1	West Germany	15–10	11–15	15–8	15–5		56–38
24 Aug	Cuba	3–1	Japan	15–10	13–15	15–4	15–13		58–42

==== Pool C ====
Location: Shanghai

Pos	Team	Pld	W	L	Pts	SW	SL	SR	SPW	SPL	SPR	Qualification
1	Soviet Union	3	3	0	6	9	1	9.000	149	80	1.863	Quarterfinals
2	Peru	3	2	1	5	6	4	1.500	128	104	1.231	Play-offs for quarterfinals
3	Netherlands	3	1	2	4	4	6	0.667	108	129	0.837	Play-offs for quarterfinals
4	Canada	3	0	3	3	1	9	0.111	75	147	0.510	13th–16th places

Date		Score		Set 1	Set 2	Set 3	Set 4	Set 5	Total
22 Aug	Soviet Union	3–1	Netherlands	14–16	15–11	15–6	15–7		59–40
22 Aug	Peru	3–1	Canada	15–5	12–15	15–7	15–9		57–36
23 Aug	Peru	3–0	Netherlands	15–13	15–7	15–3			45–23
23 Aug	Soviet Union	3–0	Canada	15–3	15–1	15–10			45–14
24 Aug	Netherlands	3–0	Canada	15–9	15–11	15–5			45–25
24 Aug	Soviet Union	3–0	Peru	15–8	15–12	15–6			45–26

==== Pool D ====
Location: Shenyang

Pos	Team	Pld	W	L	Pts	SW	SL	SR	SPW	SPL	SPR	Qualification
1	United States	3	3	0	6	9	0	MAX	135	64	2.109	Quarterfinals
2	Brazil	3	2	1	5	6	4	1.500	128	91	1.407	Play-offs for quarterfinals
3	East Germany	3	1	2	4	4	6	0.667	101	126	0.802	Play-offs for quarterfinals
4	Argentina	3	0	3	3	0	9	0.000	52	135	0.385	13th–16th places

Date		Score		Set 1	Set 2	Set 3	Set 4	Set 5	Total
22 Aug	United States	3–0	East Germany	15–4	15–13	15–8			45–25
22 Aug	Brazil	3–0	Argentina	15–2	15–8	15–5			45–15
23 Aug	United States	3–0	Brazil	15–9	15–10	15–5			45–24
23 Aug	East Germany	3–0	Argentina	15–8	15–6	15–8			45–22
24 Aug	United States	3–0	Argentina	15–2	15–8	15–5			45–15
24 Aug	Brazil	3–1	East Germany	14–16	15–5	15–1	15–9		59–31

=== Final round ===
==== Play-offs for quarterfinals ====
Location: Shenyang

Date		Score		Set 1	Set 2	Set 3	Set 4	Set 5	Total
27 Aug	Brazil	3–0	Italy	15–5	15–4	15–11			45–20
27 Aug	Peru	3–0	Chinese Taipei	15–3	15–5	15–7			45–15
27 Aug	Japan	3–0	East Germany	15–4	15–11	15–12			45–27
27 Aug	South Korea	3–1	Netherlands	9–15	15–8	15–8	15–9		54–40

==== Group head matches ====
Location: Beijing

Date		Score		Set 1	Set 2	Set 3	Set 4	Set 5	Total
27 Aug	Cuba	3–0	United States	15–13	15–12	15–10			45–35
27 Aug	China	3–0	Soviet Union	15–13	15–13	16–14			46–40

==== 13th–16th places ====
Location: Shanghai

Pos	Team	Pld	W	L	Pts	SW	SL	SR	SPW	SPL	SPR
13	West Germany	3	3	0	6	9	2	4.500	152	86	1.767
14	Canada	3	2	1	5	8	3	2.667	148	85	1.741
15	Argentina	3	1	2	4	3	6	0.500	88	98	0.898
16	Egypt	3	0	3	3	0	9	0.000	16	135	0.119

Date		Score		Set 1	Set 2	Set 3	Set 4	Set 5	Total
27 Aug	West Germany	3–0	Egypt	15–1	15–0	15–0			45–1
27 Aug	Canada	3–0	Argentina	15–2	15–2	15–12			45–16
28 Aug	West Germany	3–2	Canada	7–15	15–10	15–10	10–15	15–8	62–58
28 Aug	Argentina	3–0	Egypt	15–1	15–3	15–4			45–8
29 Aug	Canada	3–0	Egypt	15–0	15–2	15–5			45–7
29 Aug	West Germany	3–0	Argentina	15–8	15–8	15–11			45–27

==== 9th–12th places ====
9th–12th semifinals
28 August – Shenyang
Italy	3
Chinese Taipei	2
28 August – Shenyang
Netherlands	3
East Germany	0

9th place
29 August – Shenyang
Italy	1
Netherlands	3
11th place
29 August – Shenyang
Chinese Taipei	3
East Germany	0

===== 9th–12th semifinals =====
Date		Score		Set 1	Set 2	Set 3	Set 4	Set 5	Total
28 Aug	Italy	3–2	Chinese Taipei	5–15	15–12	11–15	15–2	15–9	61–53
28 Aug	Netherlands	3–0	East Germany	15–2	15–2	15–12			45–16

===== 11th place match =====
Date		Score		Set 1	Set 2	Set 3	Set 4	Set 5	Total
29 Aug	Chinese Taipei	3–0	East Germany	15–8	15–12	15–7			45–27

===== 9th place match =====
Date		Score		Set 1	Set 2	Set 3	Set 4	Set 5	Total
29 Aug	Italy	1–3	Netherlands	15–5	9–15	13–15	6–15		43–50

==== Finals ====
Quarterfinals
30 August – Beijing
Soviet Union	3
Brazil	1
30 August – Beijing
Cuba	3
South Korea	0
30 August – Beijing
United States	3
Japan	1
30 August – Beijing
China	3
Peru	0

Semifinals
31 August – Beijing
Soviet Union	3
Cuba	0
31 August – Beijing
United States	0
China	3

Final
1 September – Beijing
Soviet Union	3
China	1
3rd place
1 September – Beijing
Cuba	1
United States	3

5th–8th semifinals
31 August – Beijing
Brazil	1
South Korea	3
31 August – Beijing
Japan	0
Peru	3

5th place
1 September – Beijing
South Korea	3
Peru	1
7th place
1 September – Beijing
Brazil	3
Japan	0

===== Quarterfinals =====
Date		Score		Set 1	Set 2	Set 3	Set 4	Set 5	Total
30 Aug	Soviet Union	3–1	Brazil	9–15	15–0	15–9	15–13		54–37
30 Aug	Cuba	3–0	South Korea	15–5	15–3	15–8			45–16
30 Aug	United States	3–1	Japan	15–13	15–5	11–15	15–13		56–46
30 Aug	China	3–0	Peru	15–5	15–6	15–3			45–14

===== 5th–8th semifinals =====
Date		Score		Set 1	Set 2	Set 3	Set 4	Set 5	Total
31 Aug	Brazil	1–3	South Korea	13–15	13–15	15–11	4–15		45–56
31 Aug	Japan	0–3	Peru	1–15	2–15	6–15			9–45

===== Semifinals =====
Date		Score		Set 1	Set 2	Set 3	Set 4	Set 5	Total
31 Aug	Soviet Union	3–0	Cuba	17–15	15–7	15–8			47–30
31 Aug	United States	0–3	China	7–15	8–15	7–15			22–45

===== 7th place match =====
Date		Score		Set 1	Set 2	Set 3	Set 4	Set 5	Total
1 Sep	Brazil	3–0	Japan	15–12	15–13	15–8			45–33

===== 5th place match =====
Date		Score		Set 1	Set 2	Set 3	Set 4	Set 5	Total
1 Sep	South Korea	3–1	Peru	15–10	15–10	9–15	15–7		54–42

===== 3rd place match =====
Date		Score		Set 1	Set 2	Set 3	Set 4	Set 5	Total
1 Sep	Cuba	1–3	United States	15–11	13–15	9–15	6–15		43–56

===== Final =====
Date		Score		Set 1	Set 2	Set 3	Set 4	Set 5	Total
1 Sep	Soviet Union	3–1	China	15–13	6–15	15–9	16–14		52–51

== Final standing ==
Rank	Team
1st place, gold medalist(s)	Soviet Union
2nd place, silver medalist(s)	China
3rd place, bronze medalist(s)	United States
4	Cuba
5	South Korea
6	Peru
7	Brazil
8	Japan
9	Netherlands
10	Italy
11	Chinese Taipei
12	East Germany
13	West Germany
14	Canada
15	Argentina
16	Egypt

Qualified for the 1992 Olympic Games as reigning champions
Qualified for the 1992 Olympic Games

1990 Women's World champions

Soviet Union
5th title

Team Roster
Valentina Ogiyenko, Marina Nikulina, Elena Batukhtina, Irina Smirnova, Tatyana Sidorenko, Irina Parchomtschuk, Svetlana Vasilevskaya, Yelena Ovtschinnikova, Irina Gorbatiuk, Svetlana Korytova, Yuliya Bubnova, Olga Tolmachyova
Head coach
Nikolay Karpol

== Awards ==
- Most valuable player
  (Soviet Union) Irina Parkhomchuk
- Best attacker
  (Brazil) Ana Moser
- Best receiver
  (Peru) Sonia Ayaucán
- Best server
  (China) Li Guojun
- Best setter
  (Soviet Union) Irina Parkhomchuk
- Best blocker
  (United States) Kimberly Oden

== Statistics leaders ==
Best scorers

Rank	Name	Points
1	(Soviet Union) Irina Smirnova	149
2	(Soviet Union) Tatyana Sidorenko	136
3	(Brazil) Ana Moser	132
4	(China) Lang Ping	119
5	(United States) Caren Kemner	117
6	(Cuba) Mireya Luis	115
7	(Cuba) Regla Bell	110
8	(Japan) Motoko Obayashi	106
9	(Peru) Gabriela Perez Del Solar	102
10	(China) Wu Dan	98

Best attackers

Rank	Name	%Eff
1	(Brazil) Ana Moser	40.28
2	(Cuba) Regla Bell	38.53
3	(Soviet Union) Irina Smirnova	37.56
4	(China) Lang Ping	36.12
5	(United States) Caren Kemner	35.31

Best blockers

Rank	Name	Avg
1	(United States) Kimberly Oden	1.27
2	(Peru) Gabriela Perez Del Solar	1.17
3	(South Korea) Nam Soon-ok	0.97
4	(Soviet Union) Valentina Oguienko	0.95
5	(China) Li Yueming	0.92

Best servers

Rank	Name	Avg
1	(China) Li Guojun	0.44
2	(Brazil) Ana Moser	0.37
3	(United States) Teee Sanders	0.32
4	(Soviet Union) Irina Parkhomchuk	0.31
5	(Cuba) Mireya Luis	0.30

Best diggers

Rank	Name	Avg
1	(Japan) Ichiko Sato	3.65
2	(Peru) Sonia Ayaucán	3.16
3	(China) Lai Yawen	2.96

Best setters

Rank	Name	Avg
1	(Soviet Union) Irina Parkhomchuk	9.16
2	(United States) Lori Endicott	8.86
3	(Peru) Rosa Garcia	8.15
4	(China) Su Huijuan	7.55
5	(Brazil) Fernanda Venturini	6.98

Best receivers

Rank	Name	%Succ
1	(Peru) Sonia Ayaucán	79.17
