= Kim Oden =

American volleyball player

Kimberley Oden

Personal information
- Born: Kimberley Yvette Oden; May 6, 1964 (age 62); Birmingham, Alabama, U.S.
- Height: 6 ft 2 in (189 cm)
- Education: Stanford University

Volleyball information
- Position: Middle blocker
- Number: 4 (national team)

National team
1986–1992, 1994	United States
Medal record
Women's volleyball
Representing the United States
Olympic Games
Bronze medal – third place	1992 Barcelona	Team
World Championship
Bronze medal – third place	1990 China	Team
Goodwill Games
Silver medal – second place	1994 Saint Petersburg	Team
Pan American Games
Bronze medal – third place	1987 Indianapolis	Team

Kimberley Yvette "Kim" Oden (born May 6, 1964) is a former volleyball player and two-time Olympian who played on the United States women's national volleyball team.

== College ==
Oden was a three-time All-American volleyball player at Stanford. In 1985, she was selected as the AVCA Player of the Year and won the Honda-Broderick Award (now the Honda Sports Award) as the nation's best female collegiate volleyball player. Oden graduated from Stanford in 1986 with a degree in public policy, and then went on to play with the United States national team (1986–92, '94).

In 1995, Oden was inducted into the Stanford Athletics Hall of Fame.

== National team ==
Oden was named the Olympic team captain in 1988 and 1992. At the 1988 Summer Olympics in Seoul, Oden was selected as the "best hitter", tallying the highest hitting percentage during the Games. Four years later, she won a bronze medal with the national team at the 1992 Summer Olympics in Barcelona.

Oden helped the national team win a bronze medal at the 1987 Pan American Games. She participated at the 1990 FIVB World Championship, winning a bronze medal and being selected as the "best blocker". She also competed at the 1994 FIVB World Championship.

== Coaching ==
Oden was the head volleyball coach at Saint Francis High School in Mountain View, California, where in four years she recorded 100 wins and only 34 losses.

== Personal life ==
Originally a Southern California resident of Irvine, Oden now resides in Palo Alto. Her sisters, Elaina and Beverly, are also Olympians who played on the national volleyball team. Oden is currently a high school guidance counselor.

== Awards ==
- Three-time All-American
- Two-time National Player of the Year — 1984, 1985
- Honda-Broderick Award — 1985
- Three-time Pac-10 Player of the Year — 1983, 1984, and 1985
- Pan American Games bronze medal — 1987
- Player of the Decade on the AVCA's All-Decade Team (1980s) — 1990
- FIVB World Championship bronze medal — 1990
- "Best Blocker" at the FIVB World Championship — 1990
- Cardinal single-match record for most blocks (16)
- Olympic bronze medal — 1992
- Goodwill Games silver medal — 1994
- National Four-Women Pro-Beach Tour MVP — 1995
- Stanford Athletics Hall of Fame — 1995

== Clubs ==
- Stanford University (1994)
- Leites Nestlé (1995)
- Beşiktaş JK (women's volleyball) Istanbul (1996)

== See also ==
- United States at the 1992 Summer Olympics
