= Russia women's national volleyball team =

Women's national volleyball team representing Russia

Russia
- Association: Volleyball Federation of Russia
- Confederation: CEV
- Head coach: vacant
- FIVB ranking: 11 (2 October 2026)

Uniforms
Home	Away

Summer Olympics
- Appearances: 14 (First in 1964)
- Best result: (gold) (1968 (USSR)), (1972 (USSR)), (1980 (USSR)), (1988 (USSR))

World Championship
- Appearances: 17 (First in 1952)
- Best result: (gold) (1952 (USSR), 1956 (USSR), 1960 (USSR), 1970 (USSR), 1990 (USSR), 2006 & 2010)

World Cup
- Appearances: 8 (First in 1973)
- Best result: (1973 (USSR))

European Championship
- Appearances: 30 (First in 1949)
- Best result: (gold) (1949 (USSR), 1950 (USSR), 1951 (USSR), 1958 (USSR), 1963 (USSR), 1967 (USSR), 1971 (USSR), 1975 (USSR), 1977 (USSR), 1979 (USSR), 1985 (USSR), 1989 (USSR), 1991 (USSR), 1993, 1997, 1999, 2001, 2013, 2015)
- www.volley.ru (in Russian)
Honours
Olympic Games
Gold medal – first place	1968 Mexico City	Team (URS)
Gold medal – first place	1972 Munich	Team (URS)
Gold medal – first place	1980 Moscow	Team (URS)
Gold medal – first place	1988 Seoul	Team (URS)
Silver medal – second place	1964 Tokyo	Team (URS)
Silver medal – second place	1976 Montreal	Team (URS)
Silver medal – second place	1992 Barcelona	Team (EUN)
Silver medal – second place	2000 Sydney	Team
Silver medal – second place	2004 Athens	Team
FIVB World Championship
Gold medal – first place	1952 Soviet Union	URS
Gold medal – first place	1956 France	URS
Gold medal – first place	1960 Brazil	URS
Gold medal – first place	1970 Bulgaria	URS
Gold medal – first place	1990 China	URS
Gold medal – first place	2006 Japan
Gold medal – first place	2010 Japan
Silver medal – second place	1962 Soviet Union	URS
Silver medal – second place	1974 Mexico	URS
Bronze medal – third place	1978 Soviet Union	URS
Bronze medal – third place	1994 Brazil
Bronze medal – third place	1998 Japan
Bronze medal – third place	2002 Germany
FIVB World Cup
Gold medal – first place	1973 Uruguay (URS)
Silver medal – second place	1989 Japan (URS)
Silver medal – second place	1999 Japan
Bronze medal – third place	1981 Japan (URS)
Bronze medal – third place	1985 Japan (URS)
Bronze medal – third place	1991 Japan (URS)
Bronze medal – third place	2019 Japan (RUS)
World Grand Champions Cup
Gold medal – first place	1997 Japan
Silver medal – second place	2001 Japan
Bronze medal – third place	1993 Japan
FIVB World Grand Prix
Gold medal – first place	1997 Kobe
Gold medal – first place	1999 Yu Xi
Gold medal – first place	2002 Hong Kong
Silver medal – second place	1998 Hong Kong
Silver medal – second place	2000 Manila
Silver medal – second place	2003 Andria
Silver medal – second place	2006 Reggio Calabria
Silver medal – second place	2009 Tokyo
Silver medal – second place	2015 Omaha
Bronze medal – third place	1993 Hong Kong
Bronze medal – third place	1996 Shanghai
Bronze medal – third place	2001 Macau
Bronze medal – third place	2014 Tokyo
European Championship
Gold medal – first place	1949 Czechoslovakia (URS)
Gold medal – first place	1950 Bulgaria (URS)
Gold medal – first place	1951 France (URS)
Gold medal – first place	1958 Czechoslovakia (URS)
Gold medal – first place	1963 Romania (URS)
Gold medal – first place	1967 Turkey (URS)
Gold medal – first place	1971 Italy (URS)
Gold medal – first place	1975 Yugoslavia (URS)
Gold medal – first place	1977 Finland (URS)
Gold medal – first place	1979 France (URS)
Gold medal – first place	1985 Netherlands (URS)
Gold medal – first place	1989 West Germany (URS)
Gold medal – first place	1991 Italy (URS)
Gold medal – first place	1993 Czech Republic
Gold medal – first place	1997 Czech Republic
Gold medal – first place	1999 Italy
Gold medal – first place	2001 Bulgaria
Gold medal – first place	2013 Germany/Switzerland
Gold medal – first place	2015 Netherlands
Silver medal – second place	1955 Romania (URS)
Silver medal – second place	1981 Bulgaria (URS)
Silver medal – second place	1983 East Germany (URS)
Silver medal – second place	1987 Belgium (URS)
Bronze medal – third place	1995 Netherlands
Bronze medal – third place	2005 Croatia
Bronze medal – third place	2007 Belgium/Luxembourg
Summer Universiade
Gold medal – first place	1997 Catania
Gold medal – first place	2013 Kazan
Gold medal – first place	2015 Gwangju
Gold medal – first place	2017 Taipei
Gold medal – first place	2019 Naples
Silver medal – second place	1999 Majorca
Silver medal – second place	2001 Beijing
Bronze medal – third place	1995 Fukuoka
Bronze medal – third place	2003 Daegu
Bronze medal – third place	2011 Shenzhen

The Russia women's national volleyball team is governed by the Russian Volleyball Federation and participated in international volleyball competitions. They played from 1949 to 1991 as the Soviet Union and as the CIS in 1992.

In response to the Russian invasion of Ukraine, the International Volleyball Federation suspended all Russian national teams, clubs, and officials, as well as beach and snow volleyball athletes, from all events. The European Volleyball Confederation (CEV) also banned all Russian national teams, clubs, and officials from participating in European competition, and suspended all members of Russia from their respective functions in CEV organs.

On July 8, 2026, the International Volleyball Federation (FIVB) announced that Russian athletes and technical officials in all disciplines would be allowed to return to FIVB, World and Official competitions, following the International Olympic Committee Executive Board's decision that its previously recommended conditions of participation for Russian athletes and teams were no longer applicable. The Russian national teams were restored to the FIVB World Rankings with the same ranking points they held when their points were frozen. The FIVB also stated that the display of the Russian flag, anthem, colors and other national identifications would be determined by the FIVB and the European Volleyball Confederation (CEV) at a later date, in consultation with relevant international sports organizations.

On August 4, 2026, following consultations with relevant stakeholders, the FIVB confirmed that the Russian women's national teams would participate in the 2027 Volleyball Nations League (VNL) as one of the highest-ranked teams not yet qualified for the competition. For the 2027 edition, the VNL will expand from 18 to 19 teams in each gender category to accommodate their participation while also ensuring the participation of the Slovenia Women's National team and Finland Men's National team, which were due to qualify based on their performances in previous seasons.

== Major world titles ==
=== USSR ===
Year	Games	Host	Runners-up	3rd place
1952	1st World Championship	Soviet Union	Poland	Czechoslovakia
1956	2nd World Championship	France	Romania	Poland
1960	3rd World Championship	Brazil	Japan	Czechoslovakia
1968^{#}	19th Olympic Games	Mexico	Japan	Poland
1970^{#}	6th World Championship	Bulgaria	Japan	North Korea
1972^{#}	20th Olympic Games	West Germany	Japan	North Korea
1973^{#}	1st World Cup	Uruguay	Japan	South Korea
1980	22nd Olympic Games	Soviet Union	East Germany	Bulgaria
1988	24th Olympic Games	South Korea	Peru	China
1990	11th World Championship	China	China	United States

^{#} – 4 major titles in row in late 1960s - early 1970s (World Women's Volleyball Championship, World Cup, Olympic Games)

=== Russia ===
Year	Games	Host	Runners-up	3rd place
2006	15th World Championship	Japan	Brazil	Serbia and Montenegro
2010	16th World Championship	Japan	Brazil	Japan

== Results ==
=== Olympic Games ===
Gold Silver Bronze 4th

Olympic Games record
Year	Round	Position	GP	MW	ML	SW	SL	Representing
(Japan) 1964	Round robin	Silver	5	4	1	12	3	Soviet Union
(Mexico) 1968	Round robin	Gold	7	7	0	21	3	Soviet Union
(West Germany) 1972	Final	Gold	5	5	0	15	5	Soviet Union
(Canada) 1976	Final	Silver	5	4	1	12	7	Soviet Union
(Soviet Union) 1980	Final	Gold	5	5	0	15	3	Soviet Union
(United States) 1984	Did not participate due to boycott							Soviet Union
(South Korea) 1988	Final	Gold	5	4	1	14	5	Soviet Union
(Spain) 1992	Final	Silver	5	3	2	12	7	Unified Team
(United States) 1996	Semifinals	4th	8	5	3	18	11	Russia
(Australia) 2000	Final	Silver	8	7	1	23	10	Russia
(Greece) 2004	Final	Silver	8	5	3	19	13	Russia
(China) 2008	Quarterfinals	5th	6	3	3	10	9	Russia
(United Kingdom) 2012	Quarterfinals	5th	6	5	1	17	7	Russia
(Brazil) 2016	Quarterfinals	5th	6	4	2	12	7	Russia
(Japan) 2020	Quarterfinals	7th	6	3	3	12	11	ROC
(France) 2024	Banned by IOC							Russia
(United States) 2028	Banned by IOC							Russia
(Australia) 2032	Banned by IOC							Russia
Total	4 titles	14/18	85	64	21	212	101	

=== FIVB World Cup ===
Champions Runners up Third place Fourth place

World Cup record
Year	Round	Position	GP	MW	ML	SW	SL	Representing
(Soviet Union) 1952	Round robin	1st	7	7	0	21	0	Soviet Union
(France) 1956	Final places	1st	11	11	0	33	3	Soviet Union
(Brazil) 1960	Final places	1st	6	6	0	18	4	Soviet Union
(Soviet Union) 1962	Final places	2nd	9	8	1	25	4	Soviet Union
(Japan) 1967	Did not participate							Soviet Union
(Bulgaria) 1970	Final places	1st	9	9	0	27	1	Soviet Union
(Mexico) 1974	Final places	2nd	8	6	2	19	8	Soviet Union
(Soviet Union) 1978	Semifinals	3rd	8	6	2	19	7	Soviet Union
(Peru) 1982	5th–8th places	6th	8	4	4	14	12	Soviet Union
(Czechoslovakia) 1986	5th–8th places	6th	8	5	3	17	9	Soviet Union
(China) 1990	Final	1st	7	6	1	18	6	Soviet Union
(Brazil) 1994	Semifinals	3rd	7	5	2	17	10	Russia
(Japan) 1998	Semifinals	3rd	8	7	1	21	4	Russia
(Germany) 2002	Semifinals	3rd	11	9	2	31	11	Russia
(Japan) 2006	Final	1st	11	10	1	31	9	Russia
(Japan) 2010	Final	1st	11	11	0	33	7	Russia
(Italy) 2014	Third round	6th	11	6	5	24	17	Russia
(Japan) 2018	Second round	8th	9	6	3	22	12	Russia
(Netherlands) (Poland) 2022	Banned by FIVB							Russia
(Thailand) 2025	Banned by FIVB							Russia
(Canada) (United States) 2027	Qualified							Russia
(Philippines) 2029	To be determined							Russia
Total	7 titles	17/22	149	125	24	390	124	

=== FIVB Volleyball World Grand Champions Cup ===
- 1993 – (bronze) Bronze medal
- 1997 – (gold) Gold medal
- 2001 – (silver) Silver medal
- 2013 – 4th place
- 2017 – 4th place

=== FIVB World Cup ===
Soviet Union

- 1973 – Gold medal
- 1977 – 7th place (tied)
- 1981 – Bronze medal
- 1985 – Bronze medal
- 1989 – Silver medal
- 1991 – Bronze medal

Russia

- 1999 – Silver medal
- 2015 – 4th place
- 2019 – Bronze medal

=== FIVB World Grand Prix ===
Russia

- 1993 – (bronze) Bronze medal
- 1994 – 7th place
- 1995 – 6th place
- 1996 – (bronze) Bronze medal
- 1997 – (gold) Gold medal
- 1998 – (silver) Silver medal
- 1999 – (gold) Gold medal
- 2000 – (silver) Silver medal
- 2001 – (bronze) Bronze medal
- 2002 – (gold) Gold medal
- 2003 – (silver) Silver medal
- 2004 – 7th place
- 2006 – (silver) Silver medal
- 2007 – 4th place
- 2009 – (silver) Silver medal
- 2011 – 4th place
- 2013 – 7th place
- 2014 – (bronze) Bronze medal
- 2015 – (silver) Silver medal
- 2016 – 4th place
- 2017 – 9th place

=== Nations League ===
Nations League record
Year	Round	Position	GP	MW	ML	SW	SL	Squad
(China) 2018	Preliminary round	7th	15	8	7	26	29	Squad
(China) 2019	Preliminary round	14th	15	3	12	16	38	Squad
(Italy) 2021	Preliminary round	8th	15	8	7	30	26	Squad
(Turkey) 2022	Banned by FIVB							
(United States) 2023	Banned by FIVB							
(Thailand) 2024	Banned by FIVB							
(Poland) 2025	Banned by FIVB							
(Macau) 2026	Banned by FIVB							
2027	Qualified	—	—	—	—	—	—	—
Total	0 Title	3/8	45	19	26	72	93	—

=== European Championship ===
Soviet Union

- 1949 – (gold) Gold medal
- 1950 – (gold) Gold medal
- 1951 – (gold) Gold medal
- 1955 – (silver) Silver medal
- 1958 – (gold) Gold medal
- 1963 – (gold) Gold medal
- 1967 – (gold) Gold medal
- 1971 – (gold) Gold medal
- 1975 – (gold) Gold medal
- 1977 – (gold) Gold medal
- 1979 – (gold) Gold medal
- 1981 – (silver) Silver medal
- 1983 – (silver) Silver medal
- 1985 – (gold) Gold medal
- 1987 – (silver) Silver medal
- 1989 – (gold) Gold medal
- 1991 – (gold) Gold medal

Russia

- 1993 – (gold) Gold medal
- 1995 – (bronze) Bronze medal
- 1997 – (gold) Gold medal
- 1999 – (gold) Gold medal
- 2001 – (gold) Gold medal
- 2003 – 5th place
- 2005 – (bronze) Bronze medal
- 2007 – (bronze) Bronze medal
- 2009 – 6th place
- 2011 – 6th place
- 2013 – (gold) Gold medal
- 2015 – (gold) Gold medal
- 2017 – 6th place
- 2019 – 7th place
- 2021 – 6th place
- 2023 – Banned by CEV
- 2026 – Banned by CEV

== Current squad ==
The following is the Russian roster for the training camp in Novogorsk against Serbia in friendly matches.

Head coach: (Russia) Konstantin Ushakov

No.	Name	Date of birth	Height	Weight	Spike	Block	Current Club
1	Angelina Lazareva	13 April 1998	1.93 m (6 ft 4 in)	80 kg (180 lb)	320 cm (130 in)	305 cm (120 in)	(Russia) Zarechie Odintsovo
3	Olga Biryukova	19 September 1994	1.94 m (6 ft 4 in)	74 kg (163 lb)	315 cm (124 in)	305 cm (120 in)	(Russia) Zarechie Odintsovo
4	Polina Matveeva	8 August 2002	1.92 m (6 ft 4 in)	74 kg (163 lb)	300 cm (120 in)	293 cm (115 in)	(Russia) Dinamo-Ak Bars
5	Maria Bibina	26 March 1994	1.76 m (5 ft 9 in)	65 kg (143 lb)	258 cm (102 in)	240 cm (94 in)	(Russia) Dinamo-Ak Bars
7	Varvara Sergeeva	4 May 2004	2.00 m (6 ft 7 in)	85 kg (187 lb)	305 cm (120 in)	302 cm (119 in)	(Russia) Proton Saratov
9	Anna Ozerova	20 October 1998	1.82 m (6 ft 0 in)				(Russia) Leningradka Saint Petersburg
11	Irina Kapustina	20 April 1998	1.89 m (6 ft 2 in)	80 kg (180 lb)	300 cm (120 in)	284 cm (112 in)	(Russia) Lokomotiv Kaliningrad
16	Irina Voronkova	20 October 1995	1.90 m (6 ft 3 in)	85 kg (187 lb)	304 cm (120 in)	290 cm (110 in)	(Russia) Lokomotiv Kaliningrad
17	Tatiana Tolok	21 March 2003	1.93 m (6 ft 4 in)	77 kg (170 lb)	320 cm (130 in)	310 cm (120 in)	(Italy) Igor Gorgonzola Novara
18	Anastasiia Manzhosova	13 January 2004	1.90 m (6 ft 3 in)	66 kg (146 lb)	302 cm (119 in)	295 cm (116 in)	(Russia) Zarechie Odintsovo
19	Anna Podkopaeva	16 April 1990	1.75 m (5 ft 9 in)	59 kg (130 lb)	286 cm (113 in)	290 cm (110 in)	(Russia) Dinamo Krasnodar
21	Vita Akimova	16 July 2002	1.97 m (6 ft 6 in)	81 kg (179 lb)	312 cm (123 in)	301 cm (119 in)	(Turkey) Galatasaray Daikin
23	Marina Markova	27 January 2001	2.00 m (6 ft 7 in)	74 kg (163 lb)	345 cm (136 in)	332 cm (131 in)	(Turkey) Vakifbank Istanbul
10	Arina Fedorovtseva	19 January 2004	1.92 m (6 ft 4 in)	69 kg (152 lb)	325 cm (128 in)	310 cm (120 in)	(Turkey) Fenerbahçe Medicana
