= Mirosława Zakrzewska-Kotula =

Polish athlete (1932-1985)

Personal information
- Full name: Mirosława Zakrzewska-Kotula
- Nationality: Polish
- Born: 6 December 1932; Łódź, Poland
- Died: 21 November 1985 (aged 52); Łódź, Poland

National team
| 1948–1961 | Poland |
Honours
Representing Poland
Women's volleyball
World Championship
| Silver medal – second place | 1952 Soviet Union |
| Bronze medal – third place | 1956 France |
European Championship
| Silver medal – second place | 1950 Bulgaria |
| Bronze medal – third place | 1949 Czechoslovakia |
| Bronze medal – third place | 1955 Romania |
| Bronze medal – third place | 1958 Czechoslovakia |
- Last updated: 26 June 2015

Mirosława Zakrzewska-Kotula (6 December 1932 – 21 November 1985) was a Polish volleyball player, basketball player, handball player and coach. She was a silver and bronze medalist of FIVB World Championships and silver, three-time bronze medalist of European Championships. She was a multi-medalist of Polish Championship in volleyball and Polish Champion in handball.

== Career ==
As a volleyball player she debuted in Polish national team in the first match of Polish team at the international arena on 14 February 1948 against Czechoslovakia. She played 112 times in Polish national team (1949–1961). She won a few silver and bronze medals with Polish national team at the international arena. She ended her career in the national team on 13 September 1961, after a friendly match against Czechoslovakia. She played 14 times in Polish basketball national team (1950–1952).

She was a player of HKS Łódź, Chemia Łódź, Unia Łódź, Stal Bielsko-Biała, Wisła Kraków, Start Gdynia. After end of her career as a player she became a coach.
