= Soviet Union women's national volleyball team =

National women's volleyball team (1952–1991)

Soviet Union
- Association: Soviet Union Volleyball Federation
- Confederation: CEV
- FIVB ranking: NR (2 October 2026)

Uniforms
Home	Away	Third

Summer Olympics
- Appearances: 6 (First in 1964)
- Best result: (gold) Gold Medalist : (1968, 1972, 1980, 1988)

World Championship
- Appearances: 10 (First in 1952)
- Best result: (gold) Champions : (1952, 1956, 1960, 1970, 1990)

World Cup
- Appearances: 6 (First in 1973)
- Best result: Champions : (1973)

European Championship
- Appearances: 17 (First in 1949)
- Best result: (gold) Champions : (1949, 1950, 1951, 1958, 1963, 1967, 1971, 1975, 1977, 1979, 1985, 1989, 1991)
- www.volley.ru (in Russian)
Honours
Olympic Games
Silver medal – second place	1964 Tokyo	Team
Gold medal – first place	1968 Mexico	Team
Gold medal – first place	1972 Munich	Team
Silver medal – second place	1976 Montreal	Team
Gold medal – first place	1980 Moscow	Team
Gold medal – first place	1988 Seoul	Team
FIVB World Championship
Gold medal – first place	1952 Soviet Union
Gold medal – first place	1956 France
Gold medal – first place	1960 Brazil
Gold medal – first place	1970 Bulgaria
Gold medal – first place	1990 China
Silver medal – second place	1962 Soviet Union
Silver medal – second place	1974 Mexico
Bronze medal – third place	1978 Soviet Union
FIVB World Cup
Gold medal – first place	1973 Uruguay
Silver medal – second place	1989 Japan
Bronze medal – third place	1981 Japan
Bronze medal – third place	1985 Japan
Bronze medal – third place	1991 Japan
European Championship
Gold medal – first place	1949 Czechoslovakia
Gold medal – first place	1950 Bulgaria
Gold medal – first place	1951 France
Gold medal – first place	1958 Czechoslovakia
Gold medal – first place	1963 Romania
Gold medal – first place	1967 Turkey
Gold medal – first place	1971 Italy
Gold medal – first place	1975 Yugoslavia
Gold medal – first place	1977 Finland
Gold medal – first place	1979 France
Gold medal – first place	1985 Netherlands
Gold medal – first place	1989 West Germany
Gold medal – first place	1991 Italy
Silver medal – second place	1955 Romania
Silver medal – second place	1981 Bulgaria
Silver medal – second place	1983 East Germany
Silver medal – second place	1987 Belgium

The Soviet Union women's national volleyball team was the national volleyball team that had represented the Soviet Union in the International competitions between 1952 until 1991.

FIVB considers Russia as the inheritor of the records of Soviet Union (1952–1991) and CIS (1992). The USSR Volleyball Federation joined the FIVB in 1948, a year after the foundation of the international governing body. In 1952, they triumphed in the first ever FIVB Women's World Championship and have been dominating the international scene ever since, having won Four Summer Olympics, Five World Championships, one World Cup and 13 European Championships.

== History ==
The USSR Volleyball Federation joined the FIVB in 1948 and in 1952 they sent a team to compete in the first ever World Championship. They were soon regularly topping the podium at international competitions such as the Olympic Games, World Championship and European Championships and the World Cup.

== Major world titles ==
=== USSR ===
Year	Games	Host	Runners-up	3rd place
1952	1st World Championship	Soviet Union	Poland	Czechoslovakia
1956	2nd World Championship	France	Romania	Poland
1960	3rd World Championship	Brazil	Japan	Czechoslovakia
1968^{#}	19th Olympic Games	Mexico	Japan	Poland
1970^{#}	6th World Championship	Bulgaria	Japan	North Korea
1972^{#}	20th Olympic Games	West Germany	Japan	North Korea
1973^{#}	1st World Cup	Uruguay	Japan	South Korea
1980	22nd Olympic Games	Soviet Union	East Germany	Bulgaria
1988	24th Olympic Games	South Korea	Peru	China
1990	11th World Championship	China	China	United States

^{#} – 4 major titles in row in late 1960s - early 1970s (World Women's Volleyball Championship, World Cup, Olympic Games)

== Results ==
=== Olympic Games ===
- 1964 – (silver) Silver Medal
- 1968 – (gold) Gold Medal
- 1972 – (gold) Gold Medal
- 1976 – (silver) Silver Medal
- 1980 – (gold) Gold Medal
- 1988 – (gold) Gold Medal

Unified Team

- 1992 – (silver) Silver Medal

=== FIVB World Championship ===
- 1952 – (gold) Gold Medal
- 1956 – (gold) Gold Medal
- 1960 – (gold) Gold Medal
- 1962 – (silver) Silver Medal
- 1970 – (gold) Gold Medal
- 1974 – (silver) Silver Medal
- 1978 – (bronze) Bronze Medal
- 1982 – 6th place
- 1986 – 6th place
- 1990 – (gold) Gold Medal

=== FIVB World Cup ===
- 1973 – Gold Medal
- 1977 – 7th place (tied)
- 1981 – Bronze Medal
- 1985 – Bronze Medal
- 1989 – Silver Medal
- 1991 – Bronze Medal

=== European Championship ===
- 1949 – (gold) Gold Medal
- 1950 – (gold) Gold Medal
- 1951 – (gold) Gold Medal
- 1955 – (silver) Silver Medal
- 1958 – (gold) Gold Medal
- 1963 – (gold) Gold Medal
- 1967 – (gold) Gold Medal
- 1971 – (gold) Gold Medal
- 1975 – (gold) Gold Medal
- 1977 – (gold) Gold Medal
- 1979 – (gold) Gold Medal
- 1981 – (silver) Silver Medal
- 1983 – (silver) Silver Medal
- 1985 – (gold) Gold Medal
- 1987 – (silver) Silver Medal
- 1989 – (gold) Gold Medal
- 1991 – (gold) Gold Medal

== 1990 Last World Championship squad ==
Coach: Nikolay Karpol

No.	Name	Age	Height	Weight
1	Valentina Ogiyenko	25	182 cm (6 ft 0 in)	74 kg (163 lb)
3	Marina Nikulina	27	180 cm (5 ft 11 in)	
4	Yelena Batuchina	19	184 cm (6 ft 0 in)	
5	Irina Smirnova	22	186 cm (6 ft 1 in)	74 kg (163 lb)
6	Tatyana Sidorenko	24	185 cm (6 ft 1 in)	80 kg (180 lb)
7	Irina Parchomtschuk	25	178 cm (5 ft 10 in)	
10	Svetlana Vasilevskaya	19		
11	Yelena Ovtschinnikova	25	188 cm (6 ft 2 in)	
12	Irina Gorbatiuk	27		
13	Svetlana Korytova	22	185 cm (6 ft 1 in)	
14	Yuliya Bubnova	19	185 cm (6 ft 1 in)	
15	Olga Tolmachyova	27	180 cm (5 ft 11 in)	
