= Ewa Kowalkowska =

Polish volleyball player (born 1975)

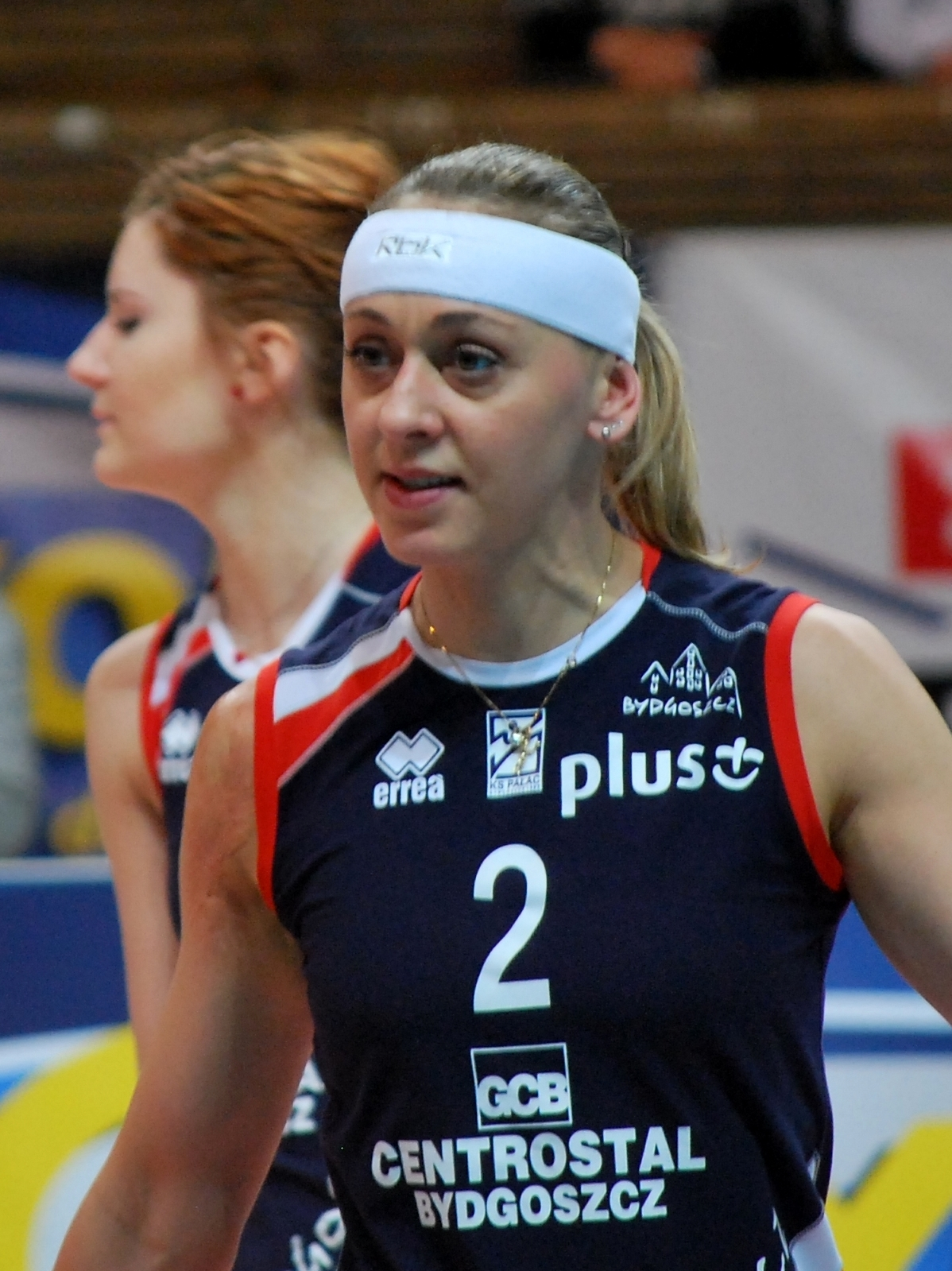
- Kowalkowska in 2011

Personal information
- Nationality: Polish
- Born: 23 February 1975 (age 51); Bydgoszcz, Poland
- Height: 1.82 m (6 ft 0 in)

Volleyball information
- Position: wing spiker
- Current club: Palac Bydgoszcz
- Number: 2 (national team)

National team
2002	Poland
Honours
Representing Poland
Women's volleyball
European Championship
Gold medal – first place	2003 Turkey

Ewa Kowalkowska (born 23 February 1975) is a retired Polish volleyball player, who played as a wing spiker.

She was part of the Poland women's national volleyball team at the 2002 FIVB Volleyball Women's World Championship in Germany, and the 2003 Women's European Volleyball Championship.

She was awarded the best server prize at the 1999 Women's European Volleyball Championship. On club level she played with Palac Bydgoszcz.

== Clubs ==
- Palac Bydgoszcz (2002)

== Awards ==
- Best server 1999 Women's European Volleyball Championship
