= Czechoslovakia women's national volleyball team =

National sports team

Czechoslovakia
- Association: Czechoslovakia Volleyball Federation (CVF)
- Confederation: CEV
- FIVB ranking: NR (2 October 2026)

Uniforms
Home	Away	Third

Summer Olympics
- Appearances: 2 (First in 1968)
- Best result: 6th Place : (1968)

World Championship
- Appearances: 8 (First in 1952)
- Best result: (bronze) Third place : (1952, 1960)

European Championship
- Appearances: 16 (First in 1949)
- Best result: (gold) Champions : (1955)
- www.cvf.cz (in Czech)
Honours
World Championship
Bronze medal – third place	1952 Soviet Union
Bronze medal – third place	1960 Brazil
European Championship
Silver medal – second place	1949 Czechoslovakia
Bronze medal – third place	1950 Bulgaria
Gold medal – first place	1955 Romania
Silver medal – second place	1958 Czechoslovakia
Bronze medal – third place	1967 Turkey
Silver medal – second place	1971 Italy
Bronze medal – third place	1987 Belgium

The Czechoslovakia national women's volleyball team was the national volleyball team for Czechoslovakia that had represented the country in international competitions and friendly matches between 1948 and 1993

FIVB considers Czech Republic as the inheritor of the records of Czechoslovakia (1948–1993).

== Results ==
=== Olympic Games ===
- (Mexico) 1968 — 6th place
- (Germany) 1972 — 7th place

=== World Championship ===
- (Soviet Union) 1952 – (bronze) Third place
- (France) 1956 – 4th place
- (Brazil) 1960 – (bronze) Third place
- (Soviet Union) 1962 – 6th place
- (Bulgaria) 1970 – 5th place
- (Mexico) 1974 – 17th place
- (Soviet Union) 1978 – 12th place
- (Peru) 1982 – didn't qualify
- (Czechoslovakia) 1986 – 11th place
- (China) 1990 – didn't qualify

=== European Championship ===
- (Czechoslovakia) 1949 – (silver) Silver medal
- (Bulgaria) 1950 – (bronze) Bronze medal
- (France) 1951 – didn't qualify
- (Romania) 1955 – (gold) Gold medal
- (Czechoslovakia) 1958 – (silver) Silver medal
- (Romania) 1963 – 6th place
- (Turkey) 1967 – (bronze) Bronze medal
- (Italy) 1971 – (silver) Silver medal
- (Socialist Federal Republic of Yugoslavia) 1975 – 5th place
- (Finland) 1977 – 5th place
- (France) 1979 – 7th place
- (Bulgaria) 1981 – 6th place
- (East Germany) 1983 – 8th place
- (Netherlands) 1985 – 4th place
- (Belgium) 1987 – (bronze) Bronze medal
- (Germany) 1989 – 5th place
- (Italy) 1991 – 5th place

== 1986 Last World Championship squad ==
Coach: Vladimír Hančík

No.	Name	Date of birth	Height	Weight
	Baráková			
	Bromová			
	Daniela Cuníková			
	Eva Dostálová			
	Dvoráková			
	Vladěna Holubová			
	Homolková			
	Stanislava Králová			
	Táňa Krempaská			
	Lajcáková			
	Simona Mandelová			
	Lucie Vaclavikova			

== See also ==
- Czechoslovakia men's national volleyball team
