= Bulgaria women's national volleyball team =

Women's national volleyball team representing Bulgaria

Bulgaria
- Association: Bulgarian Volleyball Federation
- Confederation: CEV
- Head coach: Marcello Abbondanza
- FIVB ranking: 25 (24 May 2026)

Uniforms
Home	Away

Summer Olympics
- Appearances: 1 (First in 1980)
- Best result: (bronze) (1980)

World Championship
- Appearances: 14 (First in 1952)
- Best result: 4th place (1952)

World Cup
- Appearances: 2 (First in 1981)
- Best result: 7th place (1981, 2023)

European Championship
- Appearances: 32 (First in 1950)
- Best result: (gold) (1981)
Honours
Olympic Games
Bronze medal – third place	1980 Moscow	Team
European Championship
Gold medal – first place	1981 Bulgaria
Bronze medal – third place	1979 France
Bronze medal – third place	2001 Bulgaria
Challenger Cup
Gold medal – first place	2018 Lima
European League
Gold medal – first place	2018 Hungary
Gold medal – first place	2021 Bulgaria
Silver medal – second place	2010 Turkey
Silver medal – second place	2012 Czech Republic
Bronze medal – third place	2009 Turkey
Bronze medal – third place	2011 Turkey
Bronze medal – third place	2013 Bulgaria
Universiade
Silver medal – second place	1961 Bulgaria	Team
Silver medal – second place	1973 Soviet Union	Team
Bronze medal – third place	1970 Italy	Team
Bronze medal – third place	1977 Bulgaria	Team

The Bulgaria women's national volleyball team represents Bulgaria in international women's volleyball competitions and is controlled by the Bulgarian Volleyball Federation. The team's successes includes winning the Balkan Championship in 1982, and runners-up at the 1970 Summer Universidade along with bronze at the 1980 Summer Olympics. The national team's biggest success came in 1981, winning the European title at home in Sofia.

== Competition results ==
Champions Runner-Up Semi-Finals Other Top Results

=== Summer Olympics ===
- 1964 — Did not qualify
- 1968 — Did not qualify
- 1972 — Did not qualify
- 1976 — Did not qualify
- 1980 — Bronze medal
- 1984 — Did not qualify
- 1988 — Did not qualify
- 1992 — Did not qualify
- 1996 — Did not qualify
- 2000 — Did not qualify
- 2004 — Did not qualify
- 2008 — Did not qualify
- 2012 — Did not qualify
- 2016 — Did not qualify
- 2020 — Did not qualify
- 2024 — Did not qualify

=== World Championship ===
- 1952 — 4th Place
- 1956 — 5th Place
- 1960 — Did not qualify
- 1962 — 6th Place
- 1967 — Did not qualify
- 1970 — 6th Place (as host)
- 1974 — 13th Place
- 1978 — 9th Place
- 1982 — 9th Place
- 1986 — 12th Place
- 1990 — Did not qualify
- 1994 — Did not qualify
- 1998 — 11th Place
- 2002 — 8th Place
- 2006 — Did not qualify
- 2010 — Did not qualify
- 2014 — 11th Place
- 2018 — 12th Place
- 2022 — 17th Place
- 2025 — 27th Place

=== World Cup ===
- 1973 — Did not qualify
- 1977 — Did not qualify
- 1981 — 7th place
- 1985 to 2019 — Did not qualify
- 2023 — 7th place

=== World Grand Prix ===
- 2013 — 9th Place
- 2014 — 21st Place
- 2015 — 17th Place
- 2016 — 16th Place
- 2017 — 17th Place

=== Nations League ===
Nations League record
Year	Round	Position	Pld	W	L	SW	SL
(China) 2018	Did not qualify						
(China) 2019	Relegated	16th place	15	2	13	13	41
(Italy) 2021	Did not qualify						
(Turkey) 2022	Preliminary round	14th place	12	4	8	14	27
(United States) 2023	Preliminary round	13th place	12	2	10	14	31
(Thailand) 2024	Preliminary round	16th place	12	2	10	11	34
(Poland) 2025	Preliminary round	13th place	12	4	8	19	31
(Macau) 2026	Relegated	18th place	12	2	10	10	32
(N/A) 2027	Did not qualify						
Total	6/9		75	16	59	81	196

=== Challenger Cup ===
Year	Rank
(Peru) 2018	First Place (gold)

=== European Championship ===
- 1949 — Did not qualify
- 1950 — 4th place (as host)
- 1951 — Did not qualify
- 1955 — 5th place
- 1958 — 5th place
- 1963 — 5th place
- 1967 — 6th place
- 1971 — 4th place
- 1975 — 4th place
- 1977 — 7th place
- 1979 — Bronze Medal
- 1981 — Gold Medal (as host)
- 1983 — 4th place
- 1985 — 10th place
- 1987 — 4th place
- 1989 — 7th place
- 1991 — 7th place
- 1993 — 9th place
- 1995 — 5th place
- 1997 — 4th place
- 1999 — 7th place
- 2001 — Bronze Medal
- 2003 — 7th place
- 2005 — 9th place
- 2007 — 11th place
- 2009 — 8th place
- 2011 — 14th place
- 2013 — 13th place
- 2015 — 13th place
- 2017 — 9th place
- 2019 — 8th place
- 2021 — 9th place (as co-host)
- 2023 — 7th place
- 2026 — 15th place

=== European League ===
Year	Rank
(Turkey) 2009	Third Place (bronze)
(Turkey) 2010	Runner-Up (silver)
(Turkey) 2011	Third Place (bronze)
(Czech Republic) 2012	Runner-Up (silver)
(Bulgaria) 2013	Third Place (bronze)
(Hungary) 2018	First Place (gold)
(Bulgaria) 2021	First Place (gold)

=== Balkan Championship ===
Year	Rank
(Bulgaria) 1946	Third Place
(Bulgaria) 1947	Third Place
(Bulgaria) 1970	Champions
(Bulgaria) 1971	Third Place
(Bulgaria) 1972	Champions
(Bulgaria) 1971	Runner-Up
(Bulgaria) 1974	Runner-Up
(Bulgaria) 1975	Runner-Up
(Bulgaria) 1976	Champions
(Bulgaria) 1978	Runner-Up
(Bulgaria) 1979	Champions
(Bulgaria) 1981	Champions
(Bulgaria) 1982	Third Place
(Bulgaria) 1983	Runner-Up
(Bulgaria) 1984	Champions
(Bulgaria) 1985	Champions
(Bulgaria) 1986	Champions
(Bulgaria) 1988	Champions
(Bulgaria) 1990	Runner-Up
(Bulgaria) 1992	Runner-Up

=== Summer Universidade ===
Year	Rank
(Bulgaria) 1961	Runner-Up
(Italy) 1973	Third Place
(Soviet Union) 1970	Runner-Up
(Bulgaria) 1977	Third Place

== Current squad ==
The following is the Bulgarian roster in the 2026 European Championship.

Head coach: Marcello Abbondanza

No.	Name	Date of birth	Height	Weight	Spike	Block	2025–26 club	2026–27 club
1	Emileta Racheva	26 November 1998	1.84 m (6 ft 0 in)	72 kg (159 lb)	303 cm (119 in)	285 cm (112 in)	(Serbia) OK Železničar	TBD
3	Lora Slavcheva	9 July 2001	1.84 m (6 ft 0 in)				(Bulgaria) VC Maritsa Plovdiv	(Hungary) Újpesti TE
9	Monika Krasteva	9 May 1999	1.83 m (6 ft 0 in)	68 kg (150 lb)	304 cm (120 in)	290 cm (110 in)	(Italy) PanBiscò Leonessa Altamura	(Italy) Pallavolo CBL Costa Volpino
11	Mariya Krivoshiyska	6 September 2001	1.90 m (6 ft 3 in)	76 kg (168 lb)	305 cm (120 in)	292 cm (115 in)	(Hungary) Békéscsabai RSE	TBD
13	Mila Paskuleva	6 September 2003	1.70 m (5 ft 7 in)				(Bulgaria) VC Maritsa Plovdiv	(Bulgaria) VC Levski Sofia
15	Zhana Todorova	6 January 1997	1.70 m (5 ft 7 in)	56 kg (123 lb)	271 cm (107 in)	255 cm (100 in)	(Bulgaria) VC Maritsa Plovdiv	(Bulgaria) VC Maritsa Plovdiv
16	Boryana Angelova	7 July 2005	1.93 m (6 ft 4 in)		316 cm (124 in)		(Bulgaria) VC Maritsa Plovdiv	(Bulgaria) VC Maritsa Plovdiv
19	Aleksandra Milanova	4 July 2001	1.83 m (6 ft 0 in)	72 kg (159 lb)	290 cm (110 in)	281 cm (111 in)	(Turkey) Afyon Belediye Yüntaş	(Turkey) Afyon Belediye Yüntaş
20	Iva Dudova	11 February 2006	1.98 m (6 ft 6 in)	90 kg (200 lb)			(Bulgaria) VC Maritsa Plovdiv	(Turkey) Eczacıbaşı Volleyball
23	Mikaela Stoyanova	23 June 2005	1.96 m (6 ft 5 in)		315 cm (124 in)	311 cm (122 in)	(Italy) Megavolley	(Italy) Helvia Recina Volley Macerata
26	Tsvetelina Ilieva	8 September 2001	1.80 m (5 ft 11 in)	65 kg (143 lb)	305 cm (120 in)		(Germany) Ladies in Black Aachen	(Germany) Ladies in Black Aachen
33	Kaya Nikolova	28 October 2006	1.90 m (6 ft 3 in)	73 kg (161 lb)			(Bulgaria) VC Maritsa Plovdiv	(Bulgaria) VC Maritsa Plovdiv
66	Margarita Guncheva	12 June 2006	1.82 m (6 ft 0 in)		297 cm (117 in)	285 cm (112 in)	(Bulgaria) VC Maritsa Plovdiv	(Bulgaria) VC Maritsa Plovdiv
77	Elena Kolarova	28 August 2006	1.90 m (6 ft 3 in)				(Bulgaria) VC Levski Sofia	TBD

== See also ==
- Bulgaria women's team
- Bulgaria women's U18 team
- Bulgaria women's U20 team
- Bulgaria women's U23 team
- Bulgaria men's team
