= Women's European Volleyball Championship =

Recurring volleyball competition for women's national team

- Upcoming season or competition: 2028 Women's European Volleyball Championship
- Sport: Volleyball
- Founded: 1949; 77 years ago
- First season: 1949
- No. of teams: 24 (Finals)
- Continent: Europe (CEV)
- Most recent champions: Turkey (2nd title)
- Most titles: Russia (19 titles)
- Website: cev.eu

The Women's European Volleyball Championship is the official competition for senior women's national volleyball teams of Europe, organized by the European Volleyball Confederation (CEV). The initial gap between championships was variable, but since 1975 they have been awarded every two years. The current champion is Turkey, which won its first back-to-back titles at the 2023 and 2026 editions.

The history of the women's European Volleyball Championship dates back to 1949, when the inaugural tournament was held in Prague. Seven national teams took part in the competition, with the Soviet Union becoming the first European champions. Beginning with the 1950 edition, the women's championship was held alongside the men's European Championship until 1989. That year, the men's tournament was staged in Sweden, while the women's competition was hosted by West Germany.

The format of the championship has expanded considerably over the decades. The 2019 edition marked the first occasion on which the women's European Championship included 24 teams. A total of 14 national teams have won at least one medal in the competition. Russia has the highest overall medal total.

== History ==
Seven teams participated in the first tournament, held in 1949. It was dominated by teams from Eastern Europe, who at that times were strongest teams not only at the European continent but also in the whole world. The teams from Eastern Europe dominated at the tournament for next four and half decades. The first European title was won by Soviet Union, who also won two next editions – in 1950 and 1951. At all three tournaments the Soviet team demonstrated overwhelming advantage – they not only won all matches, but also didn't lose any single set. This achievement was repeated by Soviet Union at the first Women's World Championship which was held in 1952 in Moscow.

In 1955, Czechoslovakia broke Soviet dominance and won European gold after 3–2 victory over a Soviet Union in a decisive match at the tournament. However, Soviet team returned at first positions after victory at the 1956 World Championship next year. At the next 1958 European Championship which was held in Czechoslovakia, Soviet Union took revenge and returned European title after 3–2 victories over host team and Poland who captured silver and bronze medals respectively.

The victory in 1958 marked the beginning of the era of dominance of the Soviet Union which lasted for more than two decades. From 1958 to 1979, Soviet team didn't lose any tournament by winning 7 European titles in a row. At the next European Championship which was held in 1963, Soviet Union defended own title after difficult 3–2 victory over a Poland in a decisive match of the final round. But at next two European tournaments – in 1967 and 1971 – Soviet team demonstrated overwhelming advantage not losing any single set in all matches. European Championships held in 1975 and 1977 were also won relatively easy as all matches ended with either 3–0 or 3–1 victories. However, at the 1979 European Championship, Soviet Union faced with serious resistance from opponents. In preliminary round, Soviet Union lost 2–3 to Poland. It was only second defeat of the Soviet team at the European Championships and also their first defeat within 24 years. It, however, affected little at outcome of the tournament as Polish team was eliminated after preliminary round while Soviet team won gold medals after difficult 3–2 victories over a Romania and Bulgaria in the final round. During these two decades, Soviet Union was not only dominant power in Europe but also world volleyball superpower by winning two Olympic titles (1968, 1972), two World Championships (1960, 1970) and first edition of the Women's World Cup held in 1973.

After victory at the 1980 Olympic Games in Moscow, a power of the Soviet team started to decline. At the next 1981 European Championship which was held in Bulgaria, the home team finally broke Soviet dominance. Bulgaria won their maiden European title after 3–0 victory over a Soviet Union in a decisive match of the final round which was held in Sofia. The next four European Championships were marked by rivalry between Soviet Union and East Germany. In 1983, playing at home, East Germany obtained a remarkable victory over Soviets after trailing 0–2 in a decisive match of the final round which was held in Rostock and won their maiden European title. Two years later Soviet team took revenge and returned European title after 3–0 victory over East Germany in a decisive match of the final round. But in 1987 East Germany won European Championship for second time after 3–2 victory over Soviet Union in a final match. The last European final between these national teams took place in 1989 in Stuttgart, West Germany. Soviet team won 3–1 and returned European title.

In the late 1980s, Soviet Union returned to the status of volleyball superpower not only in Europe but also in the world by winning 1988 Olympic Games and 1990 World Championships. At the 1991 European Championship, Soviet team demonstrated overwhelming advantage not losing any single set in all matches – including 3–0 victories over unified Germany in semifinals and Netherlands in the final match. It however was their last participation at the competition. Soviet national team finished its history with remarkable statistics – they won 13 of 17 European Championships (not losing any single set in all matches at 6 of 13 victorious tournaments), suffered only 5 defeats in 116 matches, with set ratio 341:43.

Following the Soviet Union's dissolution in December 1991, Russia (official inheritor of the Soviet team) continued to dominate in Europe. It's remarkable that their main European rival at those times (who became runner-up for the three times in a row) was Croatia strengthened by some former Soviet players such as Irina Kirillova, Yelena Chebukina, Tatyana Sidorenko and Maria Likhtenstein. In 1995, playing at home, Netherlands broke this dominance in a 3–1 victory over Russia in the semifinals and a 3–0 victory over Croatia in the final match which was held in Arnhem. This victory became historical not only for Netherlands, but also for the whole of Western Europe. At the next two editions – in 1997 and 1999 – Russia returned at first positions after 3–0 victories over Croatia in both final matches. But in the 2001 European Championship final Russian team faced with stronger resistance from the new rising European power – Italy (who became World Champion next year). Russia achieved difficult victory in a five-set match. Nikolay Karpol won European title as head coach for the record seventh time (starting from 1979 victory).

After victory in 2001, the period of Russia's dominance came to end, and more national teams were able to win their maiden European titles. The next tournament was surprisingly won by Poland while Russia (2001 European Champion) and Italy (2002 World Champion) faced only in 5th place match. At the 2005 European Championship, Polish team proved non-randomness of this success after 3–2 victory over a Russia in semifinals and 3–1 victory over Italy in a final match. In 2007, Italy won their maiden European title by beating Serbia 3–0 in a final match. At next European Championships, Italian team repeated this success after 3–0 victory over Netherlands in a final. In 2011, playing at home, Serbia won their maiden European title after remarkable 3–2 victory over Germany in a final match which was held in Belgrade. The next two European Championships held in 2013 and 2015 were won by Russia who beat home teams in both the final matches (3–1 over Germany in Berlin and 3–0 over Netherlands in Rotterdam respectively).

The 2017 European Championship took place in Azerbaijan and Georgia. The 2019 European Championship was co-hosted by four countries for first time – Hungary, Poland, Slovakia and Turkey. Both tournaments were finished with Serbia's success who also won World Championships in 2018. However, this winning streak was ended in 2021 when Italy beat Serbia in a final match which was held at the opponent's home ground in Belgrade and thus winning their third European title in history. Next year the Serbian team won World Championships for second time in history. But in 2023 Serbia lost European final again – Turkey beat the reigning World Champions in a 5th-set tie-breaker and thus to win their maiden European trophy.

The 34 European Championship tournaments have been won by nine nations. Russia have won nineteen times (thirteen as Soviet Union). The other European Championship winners are Italy and Serbia, with three titles each; Germany (as East Germany), Poland and Turkey, with two titles each; and Bulgaria, Czech Republic (as Czechoslovakia) and Netherlands, with one title each.

The current format of the competition involves a qualification phase, which currently takes place over the preceding two years, to determine which teams qualify for the tournament phase, which is often called the European Championship Finals. 16 teams, including the automatically qualifying host nation(s), compete in the tournament phase for the title at venues within the host nation(s) over a period of about two weeks. For the 2019 edition the number of participants in the Finals was increased from 16 to 24.

Poland holds record for the participation in the European Championships (33 times) by missing only one tournament. Bulgaria participated in the continental championships 32 times. Russia also participated in the 32 European Championships (seventeen as the Soviet Union). Netherlands participated 31 times.

== Results summary ==
Year	Host(s)	Final			3rd place match			Teams
Year	Host(s)	Champions	Score	Runners-up	3rd place	Score	4th place	Teams
1949; Details	Czechoslovakia	Soviet Union	Round-robin (3–0)	Czechoslovakia	Poland	Round-robin (3–0)	Romania	7
1950; Details	Bulgaria	Soviet Union	Round-robin (3–0)	Poland	Czechoslovakia	Round-robin (3–0)	Bulgaria	6
1951; Details	France	Soviet Union	Round-robin (3–0)	Poland	Yugoslavia	Round-robin (3–0)	France	6
1955; Details	Romania	Czechoslovakia	Round-robin (3–2)	Soviet Union	Poland	Round-robin (3–2)	Romania	6
1958; Details	Czechoslovakia	Soviet Union	Round-robin (3–2)	Czechoslovakia	Poland	Round-robin (3–1)	Romania	12
1963; Details	Romania	Soviet Union	Round-robin (3–2)	Poland	Romania	Round-robin (3–1)	East Germany	13
1967; Details	Turkey	Soviet Union	Round-robin (3–0)	Poland	Czechoslovakia	Round-robin (3–0)	East Germany	15
1971; Details	Italy	Soviet Union	Round-robin (3–0)	Czechoslovakia	Poland	Round-robin (3–2)	Bulgaria	18
1975; Details	(Socialist Federal Republic of Yugoslavia); Yugoslavia	Soviet Union	Round-robin (3–0)	Hungary	East Germany	Round-robin (1–3)	Bulgaria	12
1977; Details	Finland	Soviet Union	3–0	East Germany	Hungary	3–2	Poland	12
1979; Details	France	Soviet Union	Round-robin (3–0)	East Germany	Bulgaria	Round-robin (3–2)	Hungary	12
1981; Details	Bulgaria	Bulgaria	Round-robin (3–0)	Soviet Union	Hungary	Round-robin (3–0)	East Germany	12
1983; Details	East Germany	East Germany	Round-robin (3–2)	Soviet Union	Hungary	Round-robin (3–0)	Bulgaria	12
1985; Details	Netherlands	Soviet Union	Round-robin (3–0)	East Germany	Netherlands	Round-robin (3–0)	Czechoslovakia	12
1987; Details	Belgium	East Germany	3–2	Soviet Union	Czechoslovakia	3–0	Bulgaria	12
1989; Details	West Germany	Soviet Union	3–1	East Germany	Italy	3–0	Romania	12
1991; Details	Italy	Soviet Union	3–0	Netherlands	Germany	3–1	Italy	12
1993; Details	Czech Republic	Russia	3–0	Czechoslovakia	Ukraine	3–1	Italy	12
1995; Details	Netherlands	Netherlands	3–0	Croatia	Russia	3–0	Germany	12
1997; Details	Czech Republic	Russia	3–0	Croatia	Czech Republic	3–0	Bulgaria	12
1999; Details	Italy	Russia	3–0	Croatia	Italy	3–0	Germany	8
2001; Details	Bulgaria	Russia	3–2	Italy	Bulgaria	3–1	Ukraine	12
2003; Details	Turkey	Poland	3–0	Turkey	Germany	3–2	Netherlands	12
2005; Details	Croatia	Poland	3–1	Italy	Russia	3–0	Azerbaijan	12
2007; Details	Belgium / Luxembourg	Italy	3–0	Serbia	Russia	3–1	Poland	16
2009; Details	Poland	Italy	3–0	Netherlands	Poland	3–0	Germany	16
2011; Details	Italy / Serbia	Serbia	3–2	Germany	Turkey	3–2	Italy	16
2013; Details	Germany / Switzerland	Russia	3–1	Germany	Belgium	3–2	Serbia	16
2015; Details	Belgium / Netherlands	Russia	3–0	Netherlands	Serbia	3–0	Turkey	16
2017; Details	(Georgia (country)); Azerbaijan / Georgia	Serbia	3–1	Netherlands	Turkey	3–1	Azerbaijan	16
2019; Details	Hungary / Poland / Slovakia / Turkey	Serbia	3–2	Turkey	Italy	3–0	Poland	24
2021; Details	Bulgaria / Croatia / Romania / Serbia	Italy	3–1	Serbia	Turkey	3–0	Netherlands	24
2023; Details	Belgium / Estonia / Germany / Italy	Turkey	3–2	Serbia	Netherlands	3–0	Italy	24
2026; Details	Azerbaijan / Czech Republic / Sweden / Turkey	Turkey	3–2	Italy	Serbia	3–1	Poland	24
2028; Details	/ / (N/A) / (N/A); Slovakia / Spain / TBD / TBD							24

== Medals summary ==
Rank	Nation	Gold	Silver	Bronze	Total
1	Russia (Note: Soviet Union won 13 gold, 4 silver medals. The CEV recognizes the Russian national team as the successor to the Soviet Union's sporting achievements and results.)	19	4	3	26
2	Italy	3	3	3	9
2	Serbia (Note: Yugoslavia won 1 bronze medal.The CEV recognizes the Serbian national team as the successor to the Yugoslavia and Serbia and Montenegro sporting achievements and results.)	3	3	3	9
4	Poland	2	4	5	11
5	East Germany	2	4	1	7
6	Turkey	2	2	3	7
7	Czech Republic (Note: Czechoslovakia won 1 gold, 4 silver and 3 bronze medals. The CEV recognizes the Czechia national team as the successor to the Czechoslovakia sporting achievements and results).	1	4	4	9
8	Netherlands	1	4	2	7
9	Bulgaria	1	0	2	3
10	Croatia	0	3	0	3
11	Germany	0	2	2	4
12	Hungary	0	1	3	4
13	Belgium	0	0	1	1
13	Romania	0	0	1	1
13	Ukraine	0	0	1	1
Totals (15 entries)		34	34	34	102

== Total hosts ==
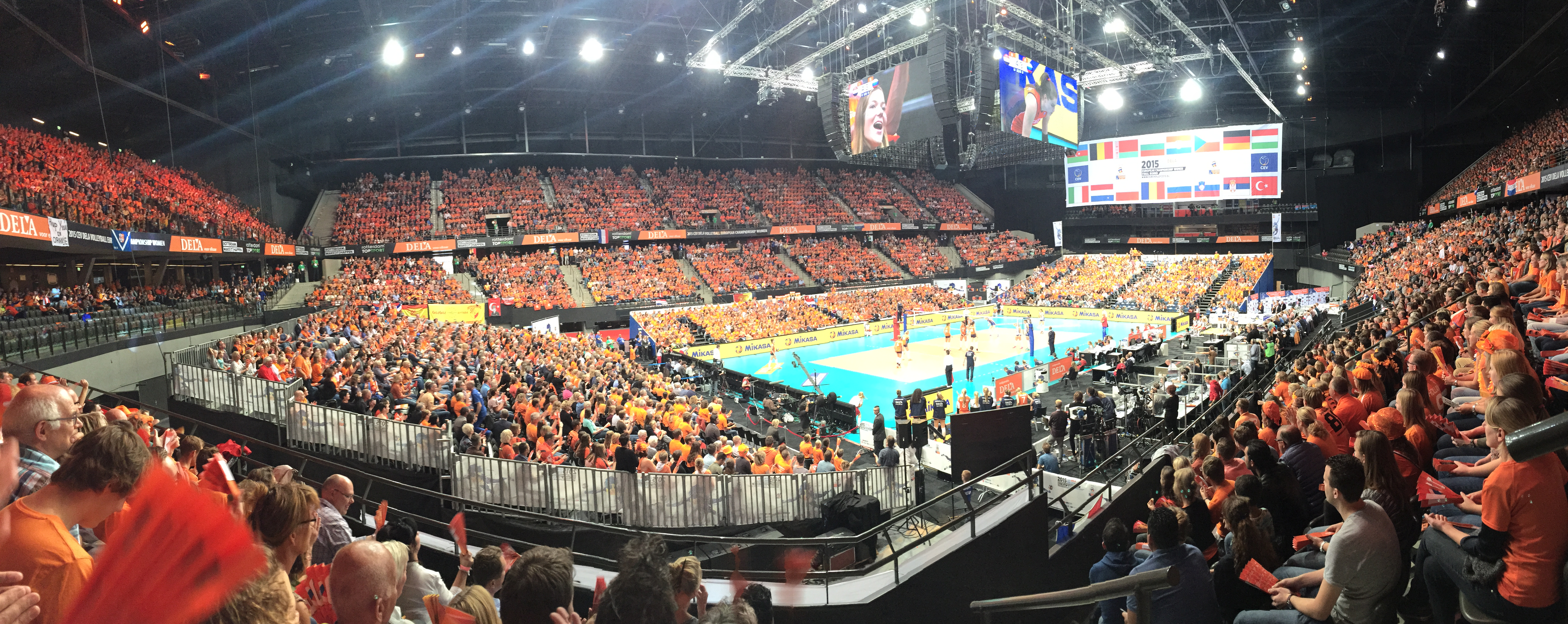
Netherlands vs. Russia Euro Women's Championship final in Rotterdam in October 2015.

Hosts	Nations (Year(s))
5	Italy (1971, 1991, 1999, 2011*, 2023*)
4	Belgium (1987, 2007*, 2015*, 2023*); Bulgaria (1950, 1981, 2001, 2021*); Turkey (1967, 2003, 2019*, 2026*)
3	Czech Republic (1993, 1997, 2026*); Netherlands (1985, 1995, 2015*); Romania (1955, 1963, 2021*)
2	Azerbaijan (2017*, 2026*); Croatia (2005, 2021*); Czechoslovakia (1949, 1958); France (1951, 1979); Germany (2013*, 2023*); Poland (2009, 2019*); Serbia (2011*, 2021*); Slovakia (2019*, 2028*)
1	East Germany (1983); Estonia (2023*); Finland (1977); Georgia (2017*); Hungary (2019*); Luxembourg (2007*); Spain (2028*); Sweden (2026*); Switzerland (2013*); West Germany (1989); Yugoslavia (1975)

* = co-hosts

== Participating nations ==
Legend

- 1st – Champions
- 2nd – Runners-up
- 3rd – Third place
- 4th – Fourth place
- • – Did not enter / Did not qualify
- – Hosts
- Q – Qualified for forthcoming tournament

Team	(Czechoslovakia); 1949 (7)	(Bulgaria); 1950 (6)	(France); 1951 (6)	(Romania); 1955 (6)	(Czechoslovakia); 1958 (12)	(Romania); 1963 (13)	(Turkey); 1967 (15)	(Italy); 1971 (18)	(Socialist Federal Republic of Yugoslavia); 1975 (12)	(Finland); 1977 (12)	(France); 1979 (12)	(Bulgaria); 1981 (12)	(East Germany); 1983 (12)	(Netherlands); 1985 (12)	(Belgium); 1987 (12)	(West Germany); 1989 (12)	(Italy); 1991 (12)	(Czech Republic); 1993 (12)	(Netherlands); 1995 (12)	(Czech Republic); 1997 (12)	(Italy); 1999 (8)	(Bulgaria); 2001 (12)	(Turkey); 2003 (12)	(Croatia); 2005 (12)
Albania	•	•	•	•	•	•	•	•	•	•	•	•	•	•	•	•	11th	•	•	•	•	•	•	•
Austria	•	•	•	•	12th	12th	•	17th	•	•	•	•	•	•	•	•	•	•	•	•	•	•	•	•
Azerbaijan	Part of Soviet Union																	•	•	•	•	•	•	4th
Belarus	Part of Soviet Union																	8th	8th	11th	•	•	•	•
Belgium	•	•	•	•	•	•	14th	•	12th	•	12th	•	•	•	12th	•	•	•	•	•	•	•	•	•
Bulgaria	•	4th	•	5th	5th	5th	6th	4th	4th	7th	3rd	1st	4th	10th	4th	7th	7th	9th	5th	4th	7th	3rd	7th	9th
Czech Republic	Part of Czechoslovakia																		10th	3rd	•	10th	11th	•
Croatia	Part of Yugoslavia																	6th	2nd	2nd	2nd	9th	•	8th
Denmark	•	•	•	•	•	13th	•	16th	•	•	•	•	•	•	•	•	•	•	•	•	•	•	•	•
England	•	•	•	•	•	•	•	18th	•	•	•	•	•	•	•	•	•	•	•	•	•	•	•	•
Finland	•	•	•	•	•	•	•	•	•	12th	•	•	•	•	•	12th	•	•	•	•	•	•	•	•
France	5th	•	4th	•	9th	•	•	13th	•	•	11th	•	10th	8th	7th	10th	9th	•	•	•	•	8th	•	•
Germany	Part of East Germany and West Germany																3rd	5th	4th	10th	4th	11th	3rd	11th
Greece	•	•	•	•	•	•	•	•	•	•	•	•	•	12th	•	•	8th	12th	•	•	•	12th	•	•
Hungary	6th	6th	•	6th	6th	7th	5th	5th	2nd	3rd	4th	3rd	3rd	9th	10th	•	•	•	•	•	•	•	•	•
Israel	•	•	•	•	•	•	8th	11th	•	•	•	•	•	•	•	•	•	•	•	•	•	•	•	•
Italy	•	•	6th	•	•	•	11th	8th	9th	11th	•	8th	7th	5th	6th	3rd	4th	4th	6th	5th	3rd	2nd	6th	2nd
Latvia	Part of Soviet Union																	11th	12th	8th	•	•	•	•
Montenegro	Part of Yugoslavia																	Part of Serbia and Montenegro						
Netherlands	7th	•	5th	•	10th	9th	7th	9th	11th	10th	6th	9th	11th	3rd	5th	•	2nd	7th	1st	9th	5th	5th	4th	5th
Poland	3rd	2nd	2nd	3rd	3rd	2nd	2nd	3rd	6th	4th	8th	5th	9th	7th	11th	9th	10th	•	9th	6th	8th	6th	1st	1st
Romania	4th	5th	•	4th	4th	3rd	9th	7th	7th	6th	5th	7th	6th	11th	8th	4th	6th	10th	•	12th	6th	7th	8th	10th
Russia	Part of Soviet Union																	1st	3rd	1st	1st	1st	5th	3rd
Slovakia	Part of Czechoslovakia																		•	•	•	•	12th	•
Spain	•	•	•	•	•	•	•	•	•	•	•	•	•	•	•	•	•	•	•	•	•	•	•	12th
Sweden	•	•	•	•	•	•	15th	15th	•	•	•	•	12th	•	•	•	•	•	•	•	•	•	•	•
Switzerland	•	•	•	•	•	•	13th	12th	•	•	•	•	•	•	•	•	•	•	•	•	•	•	•	•
Turkey	•	•	•	•	•	10th	12th	•	•	•	•	12th	•	•	•	11th	•	•	11th	•	•	•	2nd	6th
Ukraine	Part of Soviet Union																	3rd	7th	7th	•	4th	9th	•
Discontinued nations
Czechoslovakia	2nd	3rd	•	1st	2nd	6th	3rd	2nd	5th	5th	7th	6th	8th	4th	3rd	5th	5th	2nd	discontinued					
East Germany	•	•	•	•	8th	4th	4th	6th	3rd	2nd	2nd	4th	1st	2nd	1st	2nd	discontinued							
Serbia and Montenegro	Part of Yugoslavia																	•	•	•	•	•	10th	7th
Soviet Union	1st	1st	1st	2nd	1st	1st	1st	1st	1st	1st	1st	2nd	2nd	1st	2nd	1st	1st	discontinued						
West Germany	•	•	•	•	11th	11th	10th	10th	10th	8th	9th	10th	5th	6th	9th	6th	discontinued							
Yugoslavia	•	•	3rd	•	7th	8th	•	14th	8th	9th	10th	11th	•	•	•	8th	12th	discontinued						
Team	(Czechoslovakia); 1949 (7)	(Bulgaria); 1950 (6)	(France); 1951 (6)	(Romania); 1955 (6)	(Czechoslovakia); 1958 (12)	(Romania); 1963 (13)	(Turkey); 1967 (15)	(Italy); 1971 (18)	(Socialist Federal Republic of Yugoslavia); 1975 (12)	(Finland); 1977 (12)	(France); 1979 (12)	(Bulgaria); 1981 (12)	(East Germany); 1983 (12)	(Netherlands); 1985 (12)	(Belgium); 1987 (12)	(West Germany); 1989 (12)	(Italy); 1991 (12)	(Czech Republic); 1993 (12)	(Netherlands); 1995 (12)	(Czech Republic); 1997 (12)	(Italy); 1999 (8)	(Bulgaria); 2001 (12)	(Turkey); 2003 (12)	(Croatia); 2005 (12)

Team	(Belgium) (Luxembourg); 2007 (16)	(Poland); 2009 (16)	(Italy) (Serbia); 2011 (16)	(Germany) (Switzerland); 2013 (16)	(Belgium) (Netherlands); 2015 (16)	(Azerbaijan) (Georgia (country)); 2017 (16)	(Hungary) (Poland) (Slovakia) (Turkey); 2019 (24)	(Serbia) (Bulgaria) (Croatia) (Romania); 2021 (24)	(Belgium) (Italy) (Estonia) (Germany); 2023 (24)	(Azerbaijan) (Czech Republic) (Sweden) (Turkey); 2026 (24)	(Slovakia) (Spain); 2028 (24)	Total
Albania	•	•	•	•	•	•	•	•	•	•		1
Austria	•	•	•	•	•	•	•	•	•	22nd		4
Azerbaijan	12th	12th	9th	15th	14th	4th	10th	24th	17th	13th		11
Belarus	16th	15th	•	12th	9th	7th	22nd	13th	•	•		10
Belgium	7th	11th	•	3rd	6th	14th	9th	14th	15th	9th		13
Bosnia and Herzegovina	•	•	•	•	•	•	•	19th	18th	•		2
Bulgaria	11th	8th	14th	13th	13th	9th	8th	9th	7th	15th		32
Czech Republic	9th	10th	8th	10th	11th	12th	•	15th	8th	11th		13
Croatia	14th	16th	12th	5th	10th	11th	11th	10th	22nd	14th		16
Denmark	•	•	•	•	•	•	•	•	•	•		2
England	•	•	•	•	•	•	•	•	•	•		1
Estonia	•	•	•	•	•	•	23rd	•	23rd	•		2
Finland	•	•	•	•	•	•	18th	18th	21st	•		5
France	8th	14th	10th	8th	•	•	21st	7th	6th	10th		19
Georgia	•	•	•	•	•	16th	•	•	•	•		1
Germany	6th	4th	2nd	2nd	5th	8th	6th	11th	12th	8th		18
Greece	•	•	•	•	•	•	14th	22nd	19th	6th		8
Hungary	•	•	•	•	12th	15th	20th	16th	24th	23rd	Q	21
Israel	•	•	16th	•	•	•	•	•	•	•		3
Italy	1st	1st	4th	6th	7th	5th	3rd	1st	4th	2nd		28
Latvia	•	•	•	•	•	•	•	•	•	20th		4
Montenegro	•	•	•	•	•	•	•	•	•	24th		1
Netherlands	5th	2nd	7th	9th	2nd	2nd	5th	4th	3rd	5th		31
Poland	4th	3rd	5th	11th	8th	10th	4th	5th	5th	4th		33
Portugal	•	•	•	•	•	•	24th	•	•	16th		2
Romania	•	•	12th	•	15th	•	13th	23rd	11th	17th		28
Russia	3rd	6th	6th	1st	1st	6th	7th	6th	•	•		15
Serbia	2nd	7th	1st	4th	3rd	1st	1st	2nd	2nd	3rd		10
Slovakia	13th	13th	•	•	•	•	12th	17th	10th	18th	Q	8
Slovenia	•	•	•	•	16th	•	16th	•	20th	12th	Q	5
Spain	15th	9th	11th	16th	•	•	15th	21st	13th	21st	Q	10
Sweden	•	•	•	•	•	•	•	8th	16th	7th	Q	7
Switzerland	•	•	•	14th	•	•	19th	20th	14th	•	Q	7
Turkey	10th	5th	3rd	7th	4th	3rd	2nd	3rd	1st	1st	Q	18
Ukraine	•	•	15th	•	•	13th	17th	12th	9th	19th		11
Discontinued nations
Czechoslovakia												17
East Germany												12
Serbia and Montenegro												2
Soviet Union												17
West Germany												12
Yugoslavia												10

== Most valuable player by edition ==
- 1949–1983 : Not awarded
- 1985 – Ingrid Piercema (NED)
- 1987 – Lucie Václavíková (TCH)
- 1989 – Valentina Ogiyenko (URS)
- 1991 – Irina Ilchenko (URS)
- 1993 – Lucie Václavíková (TCH)
- 1995 – Elles Leferink (NED)
- 1997 – Barbara Jelić (CRO)
- 1999 – Yevgeniya Artamonova (RUS)
- 2001 – Antonina Zetova (BUL)
- 2003 – Małgorzata Glinka (POL)
- 2005 – Dorota Świeniewicz (POL)
- 2007 – Taismary Agüero (ITA)
- 2009 – Manon Flier (NED)
- 2011 – Jovana Brakočević (SRB)
- 2013 – Tatiana Kosheleva (RUS)
- 2015 – Tatiana Kosheleva (RUS)
- 2017 – Tijana Bošković (SRB)
- 2019 – Tijana Bošković (SRB)
- 2021 – Paola Egonu (ITA)
- 2023 – Melissa Vargas (TUR)
- 2026 – Melissa Vargas (TUR)

== Most successful players ==
Boldface denotes active volleyball players and highest medal count among all players (including these who not included in these tables) per type.

=== Multiple gold medalists ===
Rank	Player	Country	From	To	Gold	Silver	Bronze	Total
1	Natalya Morozova	Soviet Union; Russia	1991	2001	**5**	–	1	6
1	Yelena Tyurina (Batukhtina)	Soviet Union; Russia	1989	2001	**5**	–	1	6
3	Yelena Chebukina (Ovchinnikova)	Soviet Union; Russia; Croatia	1983	1997	4	**4**	–	**8**
4	Valentina Ogiyenko	Soviet Union; Russia	1983	1995	4	2	1	7
5	Aleksandra Chudina	Soviet Union	1949	1958	4	1	–	5
6	Yevgeniya Artamonova	Russia	1993	2001	4	–	1	5
6	Yelizaveta Tishchenko	Russia	1993	2001	4	–	1	5
8	Nina Smoleyeva	Soviet Union	1967	1977	4	–	–	4
8	Militiya Yeremeyeva (Kononova)	Soviet Union	1949	1958	4	–	–	4
10	Lyudmila Buldakova (Meshcheryakova)	Soviet Union	1955	1971	3	1	–	4
10	Lyudmila Chernyshyova	Soviet Union	1975	1981	3	1	–	4
10	Irina Ilchenko (Smirnova)	Soviet Union; Russia	1987	1993	3	1	–	4
10	Nadezhda Radzevich (Zezyulya)	Soviet Union	1975	1981	3	1	–	4
10	Tatyana Sidorenko	Soviet Union; Croatia	1985	1997	3	1	–	4

=== Multiple medalists ===
The table shows players who have won at least 6 medals in total at the European Championships.

Rank	Player	Country	From	To	Gold	Silver	Bronze	Total
1	Yelena Chebukina (Ovchinnikova)	Soviet Union; Russia; Croatia	1983	1997	4	**4**	–	**8**
2	Valentina Ogiyenko	Soviet Union; Russia	1983	1995	4	2	1	7
3	**Maja Ognjenović**	Serbia	2007	2026	2	3	2	7
4	Natalya Morozova	Soviet Union; Russia	1991	2001	**5**	–	1	6
4	Yelena Tyurina (Batukhtina)	Soviet Union; Russia	1989	2001	**5**	–	1	6
6	Yelena Godina	Russia	1995	2007	3	–	**3**	6
7	**Tijana Bošković**	Serbia	2015	2026	2	2	2	6
7	**Mina Popović**	Serbia	2015	2026	2	2	2	6
9	**Eda Erdem Dündar**	Turkey	2011	2026	2	1	**3**	6

== See also ==
- Men's European Volleyball Championship
- European Women's Volleyball League
- Women's U21 European Volleyball Championship
- Women's Junior European Volleyball Championship
- Girls' Youth European Volleyball Championship
- Girls' U16 European Volleyball Championship
