= 1999 Women's European Volleyball Championship =

Tournament details
- Host country: Italy
- Dates: 20 – 25 September
- Teams: 8
- Venue: Various (in 2 host cities)

Final positions
- Champions: Russia (16th title)

Tournament awards
- MVP: (Russia) Evgenya Artamonova

The 1999 Women's European Volleyball Championship was the 21st edition of the event, organised by Europe's governing volleyball body, the Confédération Européenne de Volleyball. It was hosted in Rome and Perugia, Italy from 20 to 25 September 1999.

== Participating teams ==
| Team | Method of qualification |
|---|---|
| Bulgaria | Qualification Division A group 1 second |
| Croatia | Qualification Division A group 2 third |
| Germany | Qualification Division A group 1 fourth |
| Italy | Qualification Division A group 1 third |
| Netherlands | Qualification Division A group 2 fourth |
| Poland | Qualification Division A group 2 winners |
| Romania | Qualification Division A group 2 second |
| Russia | Qualification Division A group 1 winners |

== Format ==
The tournament was played in two different stages. In the first stage, the eight participants were divided in two groups of four teams each. A single round-robin format was played within each group to determine the teams' group position. The second stage of the tournament consisted of two sets of semifinals to determine the tournament final ranking. The group stage firsts and seconds played the semifinals for first to fourth place and group stage thirds and fourths played the fifth to eighth place semifinals. The pairing of the semifinals was made so teams played against the opposite group teams which finished in a different position (first played against second, third played against fourth).

== Pools composition ==
| Pool A | Pool B |
|---|---|
| Italy | Bulgaria |
| Netherlands | Croatia |
| Romania | Germany |
| Russia | Poland |

== Venues ==
| Pool A and Final round | Pool B | Tournament host cities |
| Rome | Perugia | Tournament host cities |
| PalaEUR | PalaEvangelisti | Tournament host cities |
| Capacity: 11,200 | Capacity: 5,300 | Tournament host cities |

== Preliminary round ==
- All times are Central European Summer Time (UTC+02:00).

=== Pool A ===
- venue location: PalaEUR, Rome, Italy

| Pos | Team | Pld | W | L | Pts | SW | SL | SR | SPW | SPL | SPR | Qualification |
|---|---|---|---|---|---|---|---|---|---|---|---|---|
| 1 | Russia | 3 | 3 | 0 | 6 | 9 | 1 | 9.000 | 250 | 200 | 1.250 | Semifinals |
| 2 | Italy | 3 | 2 | 1 | 5 | 7 | 5 | 1.400 | 283 | 259 | 1.093 | Semifinals |
| 3 | Netherlands | 3 | 1 | 2 | 4 | 4 | 8 | 0.500 | 238 | 274 | 0.869 | 5th–8th place |
| 4 | Romania | 3 | 0 | 3 | 3 | 3 | 9 | 0.333 | 238 | 276 | 0.862 | 5th–8th place |

| Date | Time | | Score | | Set 1 | Set 2 | Set 3 | Set 4 | Set 5 | Total | Report |
|---|---|---|---|---|---|---|---|---|---|---|---|
| 20 Sep | 15:30 | Italy | 3–1 | Romania | 21–25 | 25–20 | 25–17 | 25–20 | | 96–82 | Report |
| 20 Sep | 18:00 | Netherlands | 0–3 | Russia | 24–26 | 11–25 | 20–25 | | | 55–76 | Report |
| 21 Sep | 15:30 | Italy | 3–1 | Netherlands | 25–17 | 22–25 | 25–19 | 25–17 | | 97–78 | Report |
| 21 Sep | 18:00 | Romania | 0–3 | Russia | 17–25 | 18–25 | 20–25 | | | 55–75 | Report |
| 22 Sep | 15:30 | Russia | 3–1 | Italy | 22–25 | 25–21 | 27–25 | 25–19 | | 99–90 | Report |
| 22 Sep | 18:00 | Netherlands | 3–2 | Romania | 17–25 | 23–25 | 25–21 | 25–21 | 15–9 | 105–101 | Report |

=== Pool B ===
- venue location: PalaEvangelisti, Perugia, Italy

| Pos | Team | Pld | W | L | Pts | SW | SL | SR | SPW | SPL | SPR | Qualification |
|---|---|---|---|---|---|---|---|---|---|---|---|---|
| 1 | Croatia | 3 | 2 | 1 | 5 | 6 | 3 | 2.000 | 207 | 203 | 1.020 | Semifinals |
| 2 | Germany | 3 | 2 | 1 | 5 | 7 | 5 | 1.400 | 266 | 247 | 1.077 | Semifinals |
| 3 | Bulgaria | 3 | 1 | 2 | 4 | 5 | 7 | 0.714 | 267 | 273 | 0.978 | 5th–8th place |
| 4 | Poland | 3 | 1 | 2 | 4 | 5 | 8 | 0.625 | 276 | 293 | 0.942 | 5th–8th place |

| Date | Time | | Score | | Set 1 | Set 2 | Set 3 | Set 4 | Set 5 | Total | Report |
|---|---|---|---|---|---|---|---|---|---|---|---|
| 20 Sep | 18:00 | Croatia | 3–0 | Bulgaria | 25–21 | 25–19 | 25–17 | | | 75–57 | Report |
| 20 Sep | 20:30 | Poland | 2–3 | Germany | 25–21 | 14–25 | 19–25 | 25–16 | 13–15 | 96–102 | Report |
| 21 Sep | 18:00 | Bulgaria | 3–1 | Germany | 25–22 | 25–21 | 21–25 | 25–21 | | 96–89 | Report |
| 21 Sep | 20:30 | Croatia | 3–0 | Poland | 26–24 | 26–24 | 25–23 | | | 77–71 | Report |
| 22 Sep | 18:00 | Poland | 3–2 | Bulgaria | 25–23 | 15–25 | 32–30 | 22–25 | 15–11 | 109–114 | Report |
| 22 Sep | 20:30 | Germany | 3–0 | Croatia | 25–19 | 25–23 | 25–13 | | | 75–55 | Report |

== Final round ==
- venue location: PalaEUR, Rome, Italy
- All times are Central European Summer Time (UTC+02:00).

=== 5th–8th place ===
- Pools A and B third and fourth positions play each other.

Semifinals
24 Sep
Romania | 3
Bulgaria | 1
24 Sep
Netherlands | 3
Poland | 1

5th place
25 Sep
Romania | 0
Netherlands | 3
7th place
25 Sep
Bulgaria | 3
Poland | 1

==== 5th–8th semifinals ====
| Date | Time | | Score | | Set 1 | Set 2 | Set 3 | Set 4 | Set 5 | Total | Report |
|---|---|---|---|---|---|---|---|---|---|---|---|
| 24 Sep | 11:00 | Romania | 3–1 | Bulgaria | 25–22 | 25–21 | 21–25 | 25–22 | | 96–90 | Report |
| 24 Sep | 14:00 | Netherlands | 3–1 | Poland | 29–27 | 22–25 | 25–23 | 25–23 | | 101–98 | Report |

==== 7th place match ====
| Date | Time | | Score | | Set 1 | Set 2 | Set 3 | Set 4 | Set 5 | Total | Report |
|---|---|---|---|---|---|---|---|---|---|---|---|
| 25 Sep | 10:00 | Bulgaria | 3–1 | Poland | 25–19 | 25–22 | 20–25 | 25–20 | | 95–86 | Report |

==== 5th place match ====
| Date | Time | | Score | | Set 1 | Set 2 | Set 3 | Set 4 | Set 5 | Total | Report |
|---|---|---|---|---|---|---|---|---|---|---|---|
| 25 Sep | 12:00 | Romania | 0–3 | Netherlands | 19–25 | 22–25 | 16–25 | | | 57–75 | Report |

=== Final ===
- Pools A and B first and second positions play each other.

Semifinals
24 Sep
Russia | 3
Germany | 0
24 Sep
Italy | 2
Croatia | 3

Final
25 Sep
Russia | 3
Croatia | 0
3rd place
25 Sep
Germany | 0
Italy | 3

==== Semifinals ====
| Date | Time | | Score | | Set 1 | Set 2 | Set 3 | Set 4 | Set 5 | Total | Report |
|---|---|---|---|---|---|---|---|---|---|---|---|
| 24 Sep | 16:30 | Italy | 2–3 | Croatia | 22–25 | 25–16 | 25–22 | 23–25 | 13–15 | 108–103 | Report |
| 24 Sep | 19:00 | Russia | 3–0 | Germany | 25–14 | 25–9 | 25–16 | | | 75–39 | Report |

==== 3rd place match ====
| Date | Time | | Score | | Set 1 | Set 2 | Set 3 | Set 4 | Set 5 | Total | Report |
|---|---|---|---|---|---|---|---|---|---|---|---|
| 25 Sep | 14:30 | Italy | 3–0 | Germany | 25–20 | 25–20 | 25–19 | | | 75–59 | Report |

==== Final ====
| Date | Time | | Score | | Set 1 | Set 2 | Set 3 | Set 4 | Set 5 | Total | Report |
|---|---|---|---|---|---|---|---|---|---|---|---|
| 25 Sep | 17:00 | Russia | 3–0 | Croatia | 25–18 | 25–19 | 25–12 | | | 75–49 | Report |

== Final ranking ==
| Place | Team |
|---|---|
| 1st place, gold medalist(s) | Russia |
| 2nd place, silver medalist(s) | Croatia |
| 3rd place, bronze medalist(s) | Italy |
| 4. | Germany |
| 5. | Netherlands |
| 6. | Romania |
| 7. | Bulgaria |
| 8. | Poland |

1999 Women's European champions

Russia
16th title

Team Roster
Evgenya Artamonova, Anastasia Belikova, Lioubov Chachkova, Ekaterina Gamova, Elena Godina, Natalya Morozova, Elena Plotnikova, Natalia Safronova, Elena Sennikova, Irina Tebenikhina, Elizaveta Tichtchenko and Elena Vassilevskaya.
Head coach: Nikolay Karpol.

== Individual awards ==
- Most valuable player: Evgenya Artamonova (RUS)
- Best scorer: Barbara Jelić (CRO)
- Best blocker: Elizaveta Tichtchenko (RUS)
- Best spiker: Elizaveta Tichtchenko (RUS)
- Best server: Ewa Kowalkowska (POL)
