= 1977 Women's European Volleyball Championship =

Tournament details
- Host country: Finland
- Dates: 25 September – 2 October
- Teams: 12
- Venue: Various (in 4 host cities)

Final positions
- Champions: Soviet Union (9th title)

The 1977 Women's European Volleyball Championship was the tenth edition of the event, organised by Europe's governing volleyball body, the Confédération Européenne de Volleyball. It was hosted in several cities in Finland from 25 September to 2 October 1977, with the final round held in Tampere.

== Participating teams ==
- Bulgaria
- Czechoslovakia
- East Germany
- Finland
- Hungary
- Italy
- Netherlands
- Poland
- Romania
- Soviet Union
- West Germany
- Yugoslavia

== Format ==
The tournament was played in two different stages. In the first stage, the twelve participants were divided in two groups of six teams each. A single round-robin format was played within each group to determine the teams group position. The second stage of the tournament consisted of three sets of semifinals to determine the tournament final ranking. The group stage firsts and seconds played the semifinals for 1st to 4th place, group stage thirds and fourths played the 5th to 8th place semifinals and group stage fifths and sixths played the 9th to 12th semifinals. The pairing of the semifinals was made so teams played against the opposite group teams which finished in a different position (1st played against 2nd, 3rd played against 4th and 5th played against 6th).

== Pools composition ==
| Pool A | Pool B |
|---|---|
| Bulgaria | Czechoslovakia |
| East Germany | Hungary |
| Finland | Netherlands |
| Italy | Romania |
| Poland | Soviet Union |
| West Germany | Yugoslavia |

== Venues ==
| Pool A and Final round (5th–8th) | Pool B | Tournament host cities |
| Kotka | Turku | Tournament host cities |
| Final round (9th–12th) | Final round (1st–4th) | Tournament host cities |
| Lahti | Tampere | Tournament host cities |

== Preliminary round ==
=== Pool A ===
- venue location: Kotka, Finland

| Pos | Team | Pld | W | L | Pts | SW | SL | SR | SPW | SPL | SPR | Qualification |
|---|---|---|---|---|---|---|---|---|---|---|---|---|
| 1 | East Germany | 5 | 4 | 1 | 9 | 14 | 3 | 4.667 | 240 | 145 | 1.655 | Semifinals |
| 2 | Poland | 5 | 4 | 1 | 9 | 12 | 4 | 3.000 | 222 | 143 | 1.552 | Semifinals |
| 3 | Bulgaria | 5 | 4 | 1 | 9 | 12 | 5 | 2.400 | 224 | 174 | 1.287 | 5th–8th place |
| 4 | West Germany | 5 | 1 | 4 | 6 | 6 | 13 | 0.462 | 203 | 240 | 0.846 | 5th–8th place |
| 5 | Italy | 5 | 1 | 4 | 6 | 4 | 12 | 0.333 | 134 | 215 | 0.623 | 9th–12th place |
| 6 | Finland | 5 | 1 | 4 | 6 | 3 | 14 | 0.214 | 135 | 241 | 0.560 | 9th–12th place |

| Date | | Score | | Set 1 | Set 2 | Set 3 | Set 4 | Set 5 | Total | Report |
|---|---|---|---|---|---|---|---|---|---|---|
| 25 Sep | Finland | 3–2 | West Germany | 12–15 | 15–11 | 10–15 | 15–12 | 15–8 | 67–61 | Report |
| 25 Sep | Poland | 3–0 | Bulgaria | 16–14 | 15–11 | 15–5 | | | 46–30 | Report |
| 25 Sep | East Germany | 3–0 | Italy | 15–4 | 15–10 | 15–1 | | | 45–15 | Report |
| 26 Sep | Poland | 3–0 | Italy | 15–8 | 15–10 | 15–6 | | | 45–24 | Report |
| 26 Sep | East Germany | 3–0 | West Germany | 15–9 | 15–2 | 15–10 | | | 45–21 | Report |
| 26 Sep | Bulgaria | 3–0 | Finland | 15–5 | 15–4 | 15–10 | | | 45–19 | Report |
| 27 Sep | East Germany | 3–0 | Poland | 15–13 | 15–11 | 15–5 | | | 45–29 | Report |
| 27 Sep | Italy | 3–0 | Finland | 15–8 | 15–7 | 15–8 | | | 45–23 | Report |
| 27 Sep | Bulgaria | 3–0 | West Germany | 15–13 | 15–5 | 15–7 | | | 45–25 | Report |
| 28 Sep | Bulgaria | 3–0 | Italy | 15–5 | 16–14 | 15–5 | | | 46–24 | Report |
| 28 Sep | East Germany | 3–0 | Finland | 15–4 | 15–9 | 15–9 | | | 45–22 | Report |
| 28 Sep | Poland | 3–1 | West Germany | 15–13 | 12–15 | 15–9 | 15–3 | | 57–40 | Report |
| 29 Sep | Bulgaria | 3–2 | East Germany | 15–12 | 15–7 | 1–15 | 12–15 | 15–11 | 58–60 | Report |
| 29 Sep | West Germany | 3–1 | Italy | 15–1 | 11–15 | 15–5 | 15–5 | | 56–26 | Report |
| 29 Sep | Poland | 3–0 | Finland | 15–2 | 15–1 | 15–1 | | | 45–4 | Report |

=== Pool B ===
- venue location: Turku, Finland

| Pos | Team | Pld | W | L | Pts | SW | SL | SR | SPW | SPL | SPR | Qualification |
|---|---|---|---|---|---|---|---|---|---|---|---|---|
| 1 | Soviet Union | 5 | 5 | 0 | 10 | 15 | 1 | 15.000 | 238 | 91 | 2.615 | Semifinals |
| 2 | Hungary | 5 | 4 | 1 | 9 | 12 | 6 | 2.000 | 235 | 187 | 1.257 | Semifinals |
| 3 | Czechoslovakia | 5 | 3 | 2 | 8 | 10 | 8 | 1.250 | 227 | 216 | 1.051 | 5th–8th place |
| 4 | Romania | 5 | 2 | 3 | 7 | 11 | 13 | 0.846 | 288 | 299 | 0.963 | 5th–8th place |
| 5 | Yugoslavia | 5 | 1 | 4 | 6 | 5 | 14 | 0.357 | 176 | 261 | 0.674 | 9th–12th place |
| 6 | Netherlands | 5 | 0 | 5 | 5 | 4 | 15 | 0.267 | 157 | 267 | 0.588 | 9th–12th place |

| Date | | Score | | Set 1 | Set 2 | Set 3 | Set 4 | Set 5 | Total | Report |
|---|---|---|---|---|---|---|---|---|---|---|
| 25 Sep | Yugoslavia | 2–3 | Romania | 17–15 | 8–15 | 1–15 | 18–16 | 9–15 | 53–76 | Report |
| 25 Sep | Soviet Union | 3–0 | Czechoslovakia | 15–5 | 15–9 | 15–6 | | | 45–20 | Report |
| 25 Sep | Hungary | 3–0 | Netherlands | 15–8 | 15–12 | 15–3 | | | 45–23 | Report |
| 26 Sep | Yugoslavia | 0–3 | Hungary | 9–15 | 4–15 | 6–15 | | | 19–45 | Report |
| 26 Sep | Czechoslovakia | 3–2 | Romania | 15–8 | 15–10 | 9–15 | 14–16 | 15–13 | 68–62 | Report |
| 26 Sep | Soviet Union | 3–0 | Netherlands | 15–1 | 15–3 | 15–10 | | | 45–14 | Report |
| 27 Sep | Yugoslavia | 0–3 | Soviet Union | 0–15 | 8–15 | 2–15 | | | 10–45 | Report |
| 27 Sep | Hungary | 3–2 | Romania | 15–7 | 9–15 | 13–15 | 15–8 | 15–7 | 67–52 | Report |
| 27 Sep | Czechoslovakia | 3–0 | Netherlands | 15–9 | 15–7 | 15–2 | | | 45–18 | Report |
| 28 Sep | Yugoslavia | 3–2 | Netherlands | 12–15 | 15–8 | 15–1 | 6–15 | 15–10 | 63–49 | Report |
| 28 Sep | Soviet Union | 3–1 | Romania | 15–3 | 15–7 | 13–15 | 15–4 | | 58–29 | Report |
| 28 Sep | Hungary | 3–1 | Czechoslovakia | 15–13 | 14–16 | 16–14 | 15–5 | | 60–48 | Report |
| 29 Sep | Yugoslavia | 0–3 | Czechoslovakia | 13–15 | 4–15 | 14–16 | | | 31–46 | Report |
| 29 Sep | Romania | 3–2 | Netherlands | 15–11 | 11–15 | 15–4 | 13–15 | 15–8 | 69–53 | Report |
| 29 Sep | Soviet Union | 3–0 | Hungary | 15–10 | 15–2 | 15–6 | | | 45–18 | Report |

== Final round ==
=== 9th–12th place ===
- Pools A and B fifth and sixth positions play each other.
- venue location: Lahti, Finland

Semifinals
1 Oct
Italy | 2
Netherlands | 3
1 Oct
Yugoslavia | 3
Finland | 2

9th place
2 Oct
Netherlands | 0
Yugoslavia | 3
11th place
2 Oct
Italy | 3
Finland | 1

==== 9th–12th semifinals ====
| Date | | Score | | Set 1 | Set 2 | Set 3 | Set 4 | Set 5 | Total | Report |
|---|---|---|---|---|---|---|---|---|---|---|
| 1 Oct | Yugoslavia | 3–2 | Finland | 16–18 | 15–11 | 2–15 | 15–11 | 15–8 | 63–63 | Report |
| 1 Oct | Netherlands | 3–2 | Italy | 15–6 | 5–15 | 15–5 | 11–15 | 15–11 | 61–52 | Report |

==== 11th place match ====
| Date | | Score | | Set 1 | Set 2 | Set 3 | Set 4 | Set 5 | Total | Report |
|---|---|---|---|---|---|---|---|---|---|---|
| 2 Oct | Italy | 3–1 | Finland | 15–11 | 15–5 | 8–15 | 15–6 | | 53–37 | Report |

==== 9th place match ====
| Date | | Score | | Set 1 | Set 2 | Set 3 | Set 4 | Set 5 | Total | Report |
|---|---|---|---|---|---|---|---|---|---|---|
| 2 Oct | Yugoslavia | 3–0 | Netherlands | 15–9 | 15–13 | 15–2 | | | 45–24 | Report |

=== 5th–8th place ===
- Pools A and B third and fourth positions play each other.
- venue location: Kotka, Finland

Semifinals
1 Oct
Bulgaria | 0
Romania | 3
1 Oct
Czechoslovakia | 3
West Germany | 0

5th place
2 Oct
Romania | 0
Czechoslovakia | 3
7th place
2 Oct
Bulgaria | 3
West Germany | 0

==== 5th–8th semifinals ====
| Date | | Score | | Set 1 | Set 2 | Set 3 | Set 4 | Set 5 | Total | Report |
|---|---|---|---|---|---|---|---|---|---|---|
| 1 Oct | Romania | 3–0 | Bulgaria | 15–11 | 15–2 | 15–5 | | | 45–18 | Report |
| 1 Oct | Czechoslovakia | 3–0 | West Germany | 15–6 | 15–4 | 15–2 | | | 45–12 | Report |

==== 7th place match ====
| Date | | Score | | Set 1 | Set 2 | Set 3 | Set 4 | Set 5 | Total | Report |
|---|---|---|---|---|---|---|---|---|---|---|
| 2 Oct | Bulgaria | 3–0 | West Germany | 15–6 | 15–10 | 15–6 | | | 45–22 | Report |

==== 5th place match ====
| Date | | Score | | Set 1 | Set 2 | Set 3 | Set 4 | Set 5 | Total | Report |
|---|---|---|---|---|---|---|---|---|---|---|
| 2 Oct | Czechoslovakia | 3–0 | Romania | 15–3 | 15–3 | 15–10 | | | 45–16 | Report |

=== Final ===
- Pools A and B first and second positions play each other.
- venue location: Tampere, Finland

Semifinals
1 Oct
East Germany | 3
Hungary | 0
1 Oct
Soviet Union | 3
Poland | 0

Final
2 Oct
East Germany | 0
Soviet Union | 3
3rd place
2 Oct
Hungary | 3
Poland | 2

==== Semifinals ====
| Date | | Score | | Set 1 | Set 2 | Set 3 | Set 4 | Set 5 | Total | Report |
|---|---|---|---|---|---|---|---|---|---|---|
| 1 Oct | East Germany | 3–0 | Hungary | 18–16 | 15–6 | 18–16 | | | 51–38 | Report |
| 1 Oct | Soviet Union | 3–0 | Poland | 15–3 | 15–1 | 15–7 | | | 45–11 | Report |

==== 3rd place match ====
| Date | | Score | | Set 1 | Set 2 | Set 3 | Set 4 | Set 5 | Total | Report |
|---|---|---|---|---|---|---|---|---|---|---|
| 2 Oct | Hungary | 3–2 | Poland | 16–14 | 10–15 | 15–9 | 5–15 | 15–9 | 61–62 | Report |

==== Final ====
| Date | | Score | | Set 1 | Set 2 | Set 3 | Set 4 | Set 5 | Total | Report |
|---|---|---|---|---|---|---|---|---|---|---|
| 2 Oct | Soviet Union | 3–0 | East Germany | 15–1 | 15–2 | 15–13 | | | 45–16 | Report |

== Final ranking ==
| Place | Team |
|---|---|
| 1st place, gold medalist(s) | Soviet Union |
| 2nd place, silver medalist(s) | East Germany |
| 3rd place, bronze medalist(s) | Hungary |
| 4. | Poland |
| 5. | Czechoslovakia |
| 6. | Romania |
| 7. | Bulgaria |
| 8. | West Germany |
| 9. | Yugoslavia |
| 10. | Netherlands |
| 11. | Italy |
| 12. | Finland |

1977 Women's European champions

Soviet Union
Ninth title

Team Roster
Nina Smoleyeva, Lyudmila Shchetinina, Lyudmila Borozna, Lyudmila Chernyshyova, Nadezhda Radzevich, Nina Muradyan, Tatyana Sorokina, Nadezhda Gorlovskaya, Galina Myachina, Midita Sturmane, Olga Belova and Elena Petrunina.
Head coach: Viktor Tyurin.
