= Lucie Václavíková =

Czech volleyball player and coach

Personal information
- Nationality: Czech
- Born: 20 June 1967 (age 59); Trutnov, Czechoslovakia
- Height: 1.84 m (6 ft 0 in)

Volleyball information
- Number: 11 (national team)

Career
Years	Teams
1994	Rio Casamia Palermo

National team
1986-1993; 1994	Czechoslovakia; Czech Republic

Lucie Václavíková (born 20 June 1967) is a Czech former volleyball player and assistant coach. She was part of the Czechoslovakia women's national volleyball team.

She participated at the 1986 FIVB Volleyball Women's World Championship, and won the bronze medal at the 1987 Women's European Volleyball Championship and the silver medal at the 1993 Women's European Volleyball Championship. She participated in the 1994 FIVB Volleyball Women's World Championship. On club level she played with Rio Casamia Palermo. After her career she was assistant coach of the Czech national team in 2013, 2014 and 2015.

== Clubs ==
- Rio Casamia Palermo (1994)
