= 1952 FIVB Women's Volleyball World Championship =

1952 FIVB Women's World Championship
Tournament details
- Host country: Soviet Union
- City: Moscow
- Dates: 17–29 August
- Teams: 8
- Officially opened by: Joseph Stalin

Final positions
- Champions: Soviet Union (1st title)

The 1952 FIVB Women's World Championship was the first edition of the tournament, organised by the world's governing body, the FIVB. It was held from 17 to 29 August 1952 in Moscow, Soviet Union.

== Teams ==
- Bulgaria
- Czechoslovakia
- France
- Hungary
- India
- Poland
- Romania
- Soviet Union

== Squads ==
=== Czechoslovakia ===
- Bohumila Valaŝková
- Libuše Svozilová
- Růžena Svobodová
- Jindřiška Holá
- Věra Bochénková
- Zdenka Černá
- Emília Roobová
- Regina Mataliková
- Božena Lútočková
- Bela Cigrová
- Bronislava Stulcová
- Bronislava Dostálová
- Coach: Miroslav Rovný

=== Poland ===
- Klementyna Celjnik
- Danuta Noszka
- Urszula Figwer
- Krysztyna Hajec
- Aleksandra Kubiakowna
- Halina Ordzechowska
- Halina Tomaszewska
- Katarzyna Welsyng
- Zofia Wojewodzka
- Krysztyna Zakajewska
- Mirosława Zakrzewska
- Coach: Zygmunt Krzyżanowski

=== Soviet Union ===
- Tatiana Bunina
- Aleksandra Chudina
- Sofia Gorbunova
- Militia Kononova
- Serafirna Kundirenko
- Sinaida Kuskina
- Vera Oserova
- Anna Ponomariova
- Miniona Sakse
- Valentina Sviridova
- Simonina
- Maria Toporkova
- Coach: Valentina Oskolkova

== Format ==
The tournament was played in a single round-robin format, all eight participant teams in a single pool and played each other once.

== Results ==
Pos	Team	Pld	W	L	Pts	SW	SL	SR	SPW	SPL	SPR
1	Soviet Union	7	7	0	14	21	0	MAX	315	101	3.119
2	Poland	7	6	1	13	18	6	3.000	315	201	1.567
3	Czechoslovakia	7	5	2	12	16	8	2.000	298	245	1.216
4	Bulgaria	7	4	3	11	15	12	1.250	333	293	1.137
5	Romania	7	3	4	10	11	13	0.846	272	287	0.948
6	Hungary	7	2	5	9	8	16	0.500	234	292	0.801
7	France	7	1	6	8	5	18	0.278	185	299	0.619
8	India	7	0	7	7	0	21	0.000	81	315	0.257

Date		Score		Set 1	Set 2	Set 3	Set 4	Set 5	Total
17 Aug	Soviet Union	3–0	Bulgaria	15–10	15–4	15–6			45–20
17 Aug	Czechoslovakia	3–0	Romania	15–10	15–12	15–4			45–26
18 Aug	Poland	3–0	Hungary	15–5	15–3	15–5			45–13
18 Aug	Romania	3–0	India	15–7	15–7	15–1			45–15
19 Aug	Soviet Union	3–0	India	15–0	15–1	15–1			45–2
19 Aug	Romania	3–0	France	15–7	15–4	16–14			46–25
20 Aug	Czechoslovakia	3–0	Hungary	15–9	15–8	15–9			45–26
20 Aug	Poland	3–1	Bulgaria	15–12	15–9	4–15	15–9		49–45
21 Aug	Soviet Union	3–0	Hungary	15–2	15–5	15–4			45–11
21 Aug	Czechoslovakia	3–0	France	15–4	15–1	15–0			45–5
22 Aug	France	3–0	India	15–6	15–2	15–3			45–11
22 Aug	Bulgaria	3–1	Romania	15–10	16–18	15–12	15–9		61–49
23 Aug	Czechoslovakia	3–0	India	15–7	15–11	15–12			45–30
23 Aug	Hungary	3–1	France	15–4	12–15	15–13	15–7		57–39
23 Aug	Soviet Union	3–0	Romania	15–5	15–3	15–7			45–15
24 Aug	Poland	3–0	India	15–1	15–3	15–0			45–4
24 Aug	Romania	3–1	Hungary	9–15	15–1	15–13	15–11		54–40
25 Aug	Soviet Union	3–0	France	15–2	15–3	15–7			45–12
25 Aug	Poland	3–1	Czechoslovakia	15–5	15–8	10–15	15–5		55–33
26 Aug	Czechoslovakia	3–2	Bulgaria	15–3	5–15	15–11	13–15	16–14	64–58
26 Aug	Hungary	3–0	India	15–2	15–6	15–2			45–10
26 Aug	Poland	3–0	France	15–7	15–7	15–10			45–24
27 Aug	Soviet Union	3–0	Poland	15–8	15–4	15–8			45–20
27 Aug	Bulgaria	3–1	France	15–6	5–15	15–4	15–10		50–35
28 Aug	Bulgaria	3–0	India	15–1	15–4	15–4			45–9
28 Aug	Poland	3–1	Romania	15–10	11–15	15–5	15–7		56–37
29 Aug	Bulgaria	3–1	Hungary	15–5	9–15	15–12	15–10		54–42
29 Aug	Soviet Union	3–0	Czechoslovakia	15–10	15–5	15–6			45–21

== Final standing ==
Rank	Team
1st place, gold medalist(s)	Soviet Union
2nd place, silver medalist(s)	Poland
3rd place, bronze medalist(s)	Czechoslovakia
4	Bulgaria
5	Romania
6	Hungary
7	France
8	India

1952 Women's World champions

Soviet Union
1st title

Team roster
Tatiana Bunina, Aleksandra Tschudina, Sofia Gorbunova, Militia Kononova, Serafirna Kundirenko, Sinaida Kuskina, Vera Oserova, Anna Ponomariova, Miniona Sakse, Valentina Sviridova, Simonina, Maria Toporkova
Head coach
Valentina Oskolkova
