= 1958 Women's European Volleyball Championship =

Tournament details
- Host country: Czechoslovakia
- Dates: 30 August – 10 September
- Teams: 12
- Venue: Various (in 3 host cities)

Final positions
- Champions: Soviet Union (4th title)

The 1958 Women's European Volleyball Championship was the fifth edition of the event, organised by Europe's governing volleyball body, the Confédération Européenne de Volleyball. It was hosted in Czechoslovakia from 30 August to 10 September 1958.

== Participating teams ==
- Austria
- Bulgaria
- Czechoslovakia
- East Germany
- France
- Hungary
- Netherlands
- Poland
- Romania
- Soviet Union
- West Germany
- Yugoslavia

== Format ==
The tournament was played in two different stages. In the first stage, the twelve participants were divided into four groups of three teams. In the second stage, two groups were formed, one containing the winners and runners-up from all first stage groups (eight teams in total) to contest the tournament title. A second group was formed by the last placed teams of first stage groups (four teams) which played for position places (9th to 12th). All groups in both stages played a single round-robin format.

== Pools composition ==
Pool A	Pool B	Pool C	Pool D
Czechoslovakia	Soviet Union	Hungary	Austria
East Germany	West Germany	Netherlands	Bulgaria
France	Yugoslavia	Poland	Romania

== Venues ==
Pools A, C and Final round	Pool B	Pool D	Tournament host cities
Prague	České Budějovice	Liberec	Tournament host cities

== Preliminary round ==
=== Pool A ===
- venue location: Prague, Czechoslovakia

Pos	Team	Pld	W	L	Pts	SW	SL	SR	SPW	SPL	SPR	Qualification
1	Czechoslovakia	2	2	0	4	6	0	MAX	91	54	1.685	Final pool
2	East Germany	2	1	1	3	3	3	1.000	74	75	0.987	Final pool
3	France	2	0	2	2	0	6	0.000	56	92	0.609	9th–12th pool

Date		Score		Set 1	Set 2	Set 3	Set 4	Set 5	Total	Report
30 Aug	East Germany	3–0	France	15–3	15–13	16–14			46–30	Report
31 Aug	Czechoslovakia	3–0	France	15–7	15–5	16–14			46–26	Report
1 Sep	Czechoslovakia	3–0	East Germany	15–7	15–11	15–10			45–28	Report

=== Pool B ===
- venue location: České Budějovice, Czechoslovakia

Pos	Team	Pld	W	L	Pts	SW	SL	SR	SPW	SPL	SPR	Qualification
1	Soviet Union	2	2	0	4	6	0	MAX	90	27	3.333	Final pool
2	Yugoslavia	2	1	1	3	3	3	1.000	58	55	1.055	Final pool
3	West Germany	2	0	2	2	0	6	0.000	24	90	0.267	9th–12th pool

Date		Score		Set 1	Set 2	Set 3	Set 4	Set 5	Total	Report
30 Aug	Yugoslavia	3–0	West Germany	15–6	15–3	15–1			45–10	Report
31 Aug	Yugoslavia	0–3	Soviet Union	3–15	8–15	2–15			13–45	Report
1 Sep	Soviet Union	3–0	West Germany	15–7	15–6	15–1			45–14	Report

=== Pool C ===
- venue location: Prague, Czechoslovakia

Pos	Team	Pld	W	L	Pts	SW	SL	SR	SPW	SPL	SPR	Qualification
1	Poland	2	2	0	4	6	1	6.000	103	64	1.609	Final pool
2	Hungary	2	1	1	3	4	3	1.333	86	84	1.024	Final pool
3	Netherlands	2	0	2	2	0	6	0.000	49	90	0.544	9th–12th pool

Date		Score		Set 1	Set 2	Set 3	Set 4	Set 5	Total	Report
30 Aug	Hungary	3–0	Netherlands	15–11	15–10	15–5			45–26	Report
31 Aug	Poland	3–1	Hungary	15–5	13–15	15–11	15–10		58–41	Report
1 Sep	Poland	3–0	Netherlands	15–4	15–12	15–7			45–23	Report

=== Pool D ===
- venue location: Liberec, Czechoslovakia

Pos	Team	Pld	W	L	Pts	SW	SL	SR	SPW	SPL	SPR	Qualification
1	Romania	2	2	0	4	6	2	3.000	110	76	1.447	Final pool
2	Bulgaria	2	1	1	3	5	3	1.667	113	69	1.638	Final pool
3	Austria	2	0	2	2	0	6	0.000	12	90	0.133	9th–12th pool

Date		Score		Set 1	Set 2	Set 3	Set 4	Set 5	Total	Report
30 Aug	Romania	3–0	Austria	15–0	15–3	15–5			45–8	Report
31 Aug	Romania	3–2	Bulgaria	5–15	13–15	17–15	15–11	15–12	65–68	Report
1 Sep	Bulgaria	3–0	Austria	15–0	15–3	15–1			45–4	Report

== Final round ==
- venue location: Prague, Czechoslovakia

=== 9th–12th pool ===
Pos	Team	Pld	W	L	Pts	SW	SL	SR	SPW	SPL	SPR
1	France	3	3	0	6	9	3	3.000	158	104	1.519
2	Netherlands	3	2	1	5	8	3	2.667	149	100	1.490
3	West Germany	3	1	2	4	4	8	0.500	123	150	0.820
4	Austria	3	0	3	3	2	9	0.222	86	162	0.531

Date		Score		Set 1	Set 2	Set 3	Set 4	Set 5	Total	Report
3 Sep	West Germany	3–2	Austria	15–6	14–16	13–15	15–10	15–10	72–57	Report
3 Sep	France	3–2	Netherlands	15–10	9–15	15–11	11–15	15–8	65–59	Report
5 Sep	France	3–0	Austria	15–0	15–0	15–11			45–11	Report
6 Sep	Netherlands	3–0	West Germany	15–2	15–10	15–5			45–17	Report
8 Sep	France	3–1	West Germany	15–4	15–9	3–15	15–6		48–34	Report
9 Sep	Netherlands	3–0	Austria	15–8	15–1	15–9			45–18	Report

=== Final pool ===
Pos	Team	Pld	W	L	Pts	SW	SL	SR	SPW	SPL	SPR
1	Soviet Union	7	7	0	14	21	5	4.200	369	243	1.519
2	Czechoslovakia	7	6	1	13	20	6	3.333	370	269	1.375
3	Poland	7	5	2	12	19	9	2.111	383	286	1.339
4	Romania	7	4	3	11	14	15	0.933	365	360	1.014
5	Bulgaria	7	3	4	10	11	15	0.733	321	317	1.013
6	Hungary	7	1	6	8	8	18	0.444	278	354	0.785
7	Yugoslavia	7	1	6	8	8	19	0.421	264	378	0.698
8	East Germany	7	1	6	8	5	19	0.263	201	344	0.584

Date		Score		Set 1	Set 2	Set 3	Set 4	Set 5	Total	Report
3 Sep	Yugoslavia	3–1	Hungary	15–2	15–12	10–15	18–16		58–45	Report
3 Sep	Romania	3–2	East Germany	11–15	11–15	15–5	15–2	15–11	67–48	Report
3 Sep	Czechoslovakia	3–2	Poland	15–7	11–15	12–15	15–12	15–11	68–60	Report
3 Sep	Soviet Union	3–0	Bulgaria	15–7	15–8	15–13			45–28	Report
4 Sep	Yugoslavia	1–3	Soviet Union	15–13	2–15	5–15	2–15		24–58	Report
4 Sep	Poland	3–1	Romania	5–15	15–7	15–8	15–8		50–38	Report
4 Sep	Czechoslovakia	3–0	Bulgaria	15–4	15–13	15–12			45–29	Report
4 Sep	Hungary	3–0	East Germany	15–8	15–8	15–10			–	Report
6 Sep	Yugoslavia	0–3	Czechoslovakia	4–15	8–15	5–15			17–45	Report
6 Sep	Poland	3–0	East Germany	15–5	15–1	15–5			45–11	Report
6 Sep	Soviet Union	3–0	Hungary	15–8	15–11	15–7			45–26	Report
6 Sep	Romania	3–1	Bulgaria	14–16	15–8	15–12	15–11		59–47	Report
7 Sep	Yugoslavia	1–3	Romania	6–15	16–18	15–13	11–15		48–61	Report
7 Sep	Czechoslovakia	3–0	Hungary	15–3	15–5	15–12			45–20	Report
7 Sep	Soviet Union	3–0	East Germany	15–5	15–6	15–4			45–15	Report
7 Sep	Poland	3–1	Bulgaria	15–12	14–16	15–8	16–14		60–50	Report
8 Sep	Yugoslavia	0–3	Poland	1–15	11–15	1–15			13–45	Report
8 Sep	Bulgaria	3–0	East Germany	15–2	15–5	15–11			45–18	Report
8 Sep	Romania	3–2	Hungary	10–15	15–13	15–12	13–15	15–10	68–65	Report
8 Sep	Soviet Union	3–2	Czechoslovakia	15–9	8–15	15–13	13–15	15–11	66–63	Report
9 Sep	Yugoslavia	2–3	Bulgaria	5–15	15–10	15–13	10–15	9–15	54–68	Report
9 Sep	Czechoslovakia	3–0	East Germany	15–12	17–15	15–0			47–27	Report
9 Sep	Soviet Union	3–0	Romania	15–4	15–8	15–10			45–22	Report
9 Sep	Poland	3–1	Hungary	15–10	13–15	15–6	15–10		58–41	Report
10 Sep	Yugoslavia	1–3	East Germany	12–15	15–11	13–15	10–15		50–56	Report
10 Sep	Czechoslovakia	3–1	Romania	15–13	15–13	12–15	15–9		57–50	Report
10 Sep	Bulgaria	3–1	Hungary	15–6	9–15	15–6	15–9		54–36	Report
10 Sep	Soviet Union	3–2	Poland	13–15	6–15	15–10	16–14	15–11	65–65	Report

== Final ranking ==
Place	Team
1st place, gold medalist(s)	Soviet Union
2nd place, silver medalist(s)	Czechoslovakia
3rd place, bronze medalist(s)	Poland
4.	Romania
5.	Bulgaria
6.	Hungary
7.	Yugoslavia
8.	East Germany
9.	France
10.	Netherlands
11.	West Germany
12.	Austria

1958 Women's European champions

Soviet Union
Fourth title
