= 1955 Women's European Volleyball Championship =

Tournament details
- Host country: Romania
- Dates: 15 – 24 June
- Teams: 6

Final positions
- Champions: Czechoslovakia (1st title)

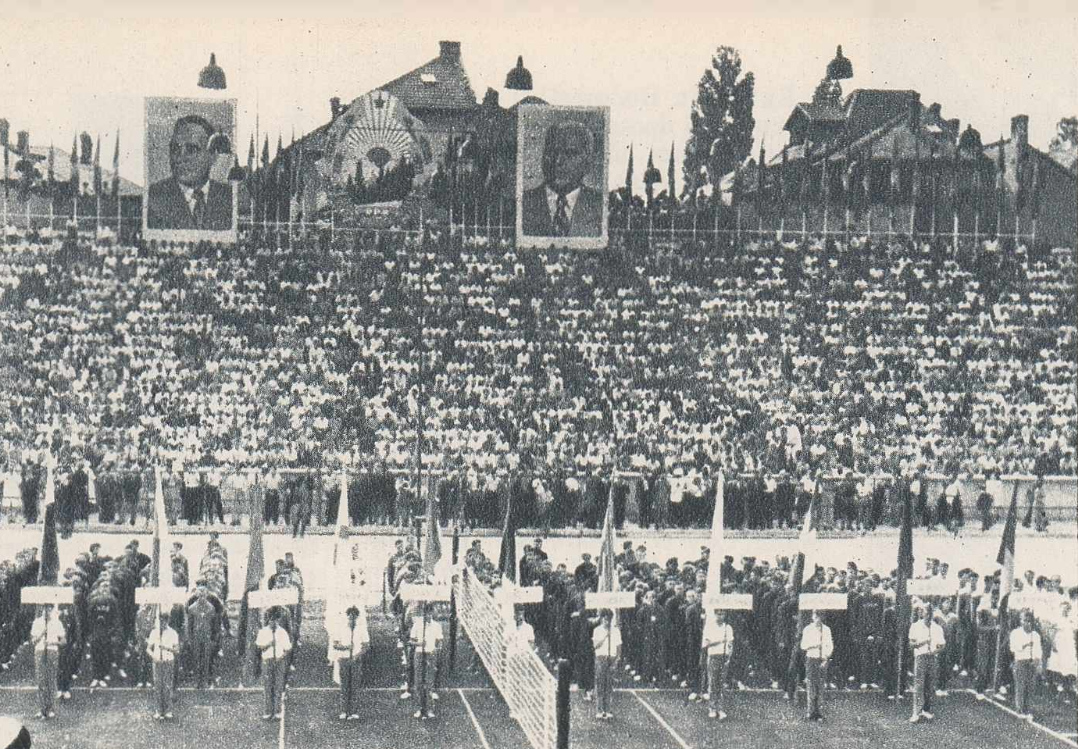

The 1955 Women's European Volleyball Championship was the fourth edition of the event, organised by Europe's governing volleyball body, the Confédération Européenne de Volleyball. It was hosted in Bucharest, Romania from 15 to 24 June 1955.

== Participating teams ==
- Bulgaria
- Czechoslovakia
- Hungary
- Poland
- Romania
- Soviet Union

== Format ==
The tournament was played in a single round-robin format, with all teams placed in a single group.

== Group and matches ==
Pos	Team	Pld	W	L	Pts	SW	SL	SR	SPW	SPL	SPR
1	Czechoslovakia	5	5	0	10	15	6	2.500	283	225	1.258
2	Soviet Union	5	4	1	9	14	4	3.500	248	166	1.494
3	Poland	5	3	2	8	12	10	1.200	272	264	1.030
4	Romania	5	2	3	7	8	11	0.727	223	253	0.881
5	Bulgaria	5	1	4	6	9	13	0.692	254	295	0.861
6	Hungary	5	0	5	5	1	15	0.067	161	238	0.676

Date		Score		Set 1	Set 2	Set 3	Set 4	Set 5	Total	Report
15 Jun	Romania	3–0	Hungary	15–7	15–13	15–13			45–33	Report
15 Jun	Soviet Union	3–0	Bulgaria	15–10	15–6	15–11			45–27	Report
15 Jun	Czechoslovakia	3–2	Poland	15–13	15–4	14–16	7–15	15–11	66–59	Report
17 Jun	Czechoslovakia	3–0	Hungary	15–5	15–12	15–6			45–23	Report
17 Jun	Poland	3–2	Bulgaria	15–9	8–15	15–5	11–15	15–10	64–54	Report
17 Jun	Soviet Union	3–0	Romania	15–4	15–5	15–13			45–22	Report
19 Jun	Poland	3–0	Hungary	15–6	15–12	15–11			45–29	Report
19 Jun	Romania	3–2	Bulgaria	15–13	10–15	10–15	15–7	15–11	65–61	Report
19 Jun	Czechoslovakia	3–2	Soviet Union	15–9	8–15	15–7	7–15	15–13	60–59	Report
22 Jun	Czechoslovakia	3–2	Bulgaria	15–5	7–15	15–10	15–17	15–7	67–54	Report
22 Jun	Soviet Union	3–0	Hungary	15–8	15–11	15–3			45–22	Report
22 Jun	Poland	3–2	Romania	9–15	15–5	15–13	15–17	15–11	69–61	Report
24 Jun	Czechoslovakia	3–0	Romania	15–13	15–4	15–13			45–30	Report
24 Jun	Bulgaria	3–1	Hungary	12–15	15–12	15–13	16–14		58–54	Report
24 Jun	Soviet Union	3–1	Poland	15–9	15–5	9–15	15–6		54–35	Report

== Final ranking ==
Place	Team
1st place, gold medalist(s)	Czechoslovakia
2nd place, silver medalist(s)	Soviet Union
3rd place, bronze medalist(s)	Poland
4.	Romania
5.	Bulgaria
6.	Hungary

1955 Women's European champions

Czechoslovakia
First title
