= 1950 Women's European Volleyball Championship =

Tournament details
- Host country: Bulgaria
- Dates: 14–22 October
- Teams: 6

Final positions
- Champions: Soviet Union (2nd title)

The 1950 Women's European Volleyball Championship was the second edition of the event, organised by Europe's governing volleyball body, the Confédération Européenne de Volleyball. It was hosted in Sofia, Bulgaria from 14 to 22 October 1950.

== Participating teams ==
- Bulgaria
- Czechoslovakia
- Hungary
- Poland
- Romania
- Soviet Union

== Format ==
The tournament was played in a single round-robin format, with all teams placed in a single group.

== Group and matches ==
Pos	Team	Pld	W	L	Pts	SW	SL	SR	SPW	SPL	SPR
1	Soviet Union	5	5	0	10	15	0	MAX	226	79	2.861
2	Poland	5	4	1	9	12	4	3.000	220	157	1.401
3	Czechoslovakia	5	3	2	8	10	6	1.667	201	174	1.155
4	Bulgaria	5	2	3	7	6	11	0.545	170	221	0.769
5	Romania	5	1	4	6	4	14	0.286	166	240	0.692
6	Hungary	5	0	5	5	3	15	0.200	153	265	0.577

Date		Score		Set 1	Set 2	Set 3	Set 4	Set 5	Total	Report
14 Oct	Poland	3–0	Bulgaria	15–12	15–7	15–7			45–26	Report
15 Oct	Czechoslovakia	3–0	Hungary	15–7	15–11	15–3			45–21	Report
15 Oct	Soviet Union	3–0	Romania	15–3	15–0	15–3			45–6	Report
16 Oct	Soviet Union	3–0	Hungary	15–6	15–7	15–4			45–17	Report
16 Oct	Poland	3–1	Czechoslovakia	15–9	15–3	12–15	17–15		59–42	Report
17 Oct	Bulgaria	3–1	Romania	9–15	15–8	15–8	15–8		54–39	Report
18 Oct	Czechoslovakia	3–0	Bulgaria	15–7	15–13	15–3			45–23	Report
18 Oct	Romania	3–2	Hungary	15–8	12–15	12–15	15–4	15–9	69–51	Report
19 Oct	Soviet Union	3–0	Poland	15–6	15–6	16–14			46–26	Report
20 Oct	Bulgaria	3–1	Hungary	13–15	18–16	15–9	15–7		61–47	Report
20 Oct	Poland	3–0	Romania	15–10	15–9	15–7			45–26	Report
21 Oct	Soviet Union	3–0	Czechoslovakia	15–11	15–5	15–8			45–24	Report
22 Oct	Soviet Union	3–0	Bulgaria	15–1	15–3	15–2			45–6	Report
22 Oct	Czechoslovakia	3–0	Romania	15–6	15–9	15–11			45–26	Report
22 Oct	Poland	3–0	Hungary	15–6	15–6	15–5			45–17	Report

== Final ranking ==
Place	Team
1st place, gold medalist(s)	Soviet Union
2nd place, silver medalist(s)	Poland
3rd place, bronze medalist(s)	Czechoslovakia
4.	Bulgaria
5.	Romania
6.	Hungary

1950 Women's European champions

Soviet Union
Second title
