= 1949 Women's European Volleyball Championship =

Tournament details
- Host country: Czechoslovakia
- Dates: 10 – 18 September
- Teams: 7

Final positions
- Champions: Soviet Union (1st title)

The 1949 Women's European Volleyball Championship was the first edition of the event, organised by Europe's governing volleyball body, the Confédération Européenne de Volleyball. It was hosted in Prague, Czechoslovakia from 10 to 18 September 1949.

== Participating teams ==
- Czechoslovakia
- France
- Hungary
- Netherlands
- Poland
- Romania
- Soviet Union

== Format ==
The tournament was played in a single round-robin format, with all teams placed in a single group.

== Group and matches ==
Pos	Team	Pld	W	L	Pts	SW	SL	SR	SPW	SPL	SPR
1	Soviet Union	6	6	0	12	18	0	MAX	271	89	3.045
2	Czechoslovakia	6	5	1	11	15	3	5.000	261	128	2.039
3	Poland	6	4	2	10	12	6	2.000	240	166	1.446
4	Romania	6	3	3	9	9	11	0.818	195	221	0.882
5	France	6	2	4	8	7	13	0.538	187	232	0.806
6	Hungary	6	1	5	7	5	15	0.333	155	261	0.594
7	Netherlands	6	0	6	6	0	18	0.000	58	270	0.215

Date		Score		Set 1	Set 2	Set 3	Set 4	Set 5	Total	Report
10 Sep	Czechoslovakia	3–0	France	15–3	15–0	15–9			45–12	Report
10 Sep	Romania	3–1	Hungary	15–10	13–15	15–6	15–9		58–40	Report
10 Sep	Soviet Union	3–0	Poland	15–13	15–4	15–3			45–20	Report
11 Sep	Poland	3–0	Romania	15–10	15–3	15–7			45–20	Report
11 Sep	France	3–1	Hungary	15–17	15–11	15–2	15–11		60–41	Report
12 Sep	Czechoslovakia	3–0	Netherlands	15–8	15–0	15–1			45–9	Report
13 Sep	Poland	3–0	France	15–13	15–7	15–6			45–26	Report
13 Sep	Hungary	3–0	Netherlands	15–1	15–4	15–3			45–8	Report
13 Sep	Soviet Union	3–0	Romania	15–5	15–0	15–6			45–11	Report
14 Sep	Poland	3–0	Netherlands	15–0	15–6	15–4			45–10	Report
14 Sep	Czechoslovakia	3–0	Hungary	15–2	15–6	15–1			45–9	Report
14 Sep	Soviet Union	3–0	France	15–1	15–4	15–2			45–7	Report
15 Sep	Romania	3–0	Netherlands	15–5	15–3	15–1			45–9	Report
15 Sep	Soviet Union	3–0	Hungary	15–0	15–1	15–0			45–1	Report
16 Sep	Czechoslovakia	3–0	Poland	15–13	16–14	15–13			46–40	Report
16 Sep	Soviet Union	3–0	Netherlands	15–1	15–4	15–10			45–15	Report
16 Sep	Romania	3–1	France	4–15	15–10	15–1	15–11		49–37	Report
17 Sep	Soviet Union	3–0	Czechoslovakia	15–10	16–14	15–11			46–35	Report
17 Sep	France	3–0	Netherlands	15–0	15–0	15–7			45–7	Report
18 Sep	Poland	3–0	Hungary	15–4	15–6	15–9			45–19	Report
18 Sep	Czechoslovakia	3–0	Romania	15–1	15–8	15–3			45–12	Report

== Final ranking ==
Place	Team
1st place, gold medalist(s)	Soviet Union
2nd place, silver medalist(s)	Czechoslovakia
3rd place, bronze medalist(s)	Poland
4.	Romania
5.	France
6.	Hungary
7.	Netherlands

1949 Women's European champions

Soviet Union
First title
