= 1951 Women's European Volleyball Championship =

Tournament details
- Host country: France
- Dates: 15–22 September
- Teams: 6

Final positions
- Champions: URS (3rd title)

The 1951 Women's European Volleyball Championship was the third edition of the event, organised by Europe's governing volleyball body, the Confédération Européenne de Volleyball. It was hosted in Paris, France from 15 to 22 September 1951.

== Participating teams ==
- France
- Italy
- Netherlands
- Poland
- Soviet Union
- Yugoslavia

== Format ==
The tournament was played in two different stages. In the first stage, the six participants were divided into two groups of three teams. The winners and runners-up of each group advanced to a second stage of a single group containing four teams. All groups in both stages played a single round-robin format.

== Pools composition ==
Pool 1	Pool 2
France	Italy
Netherlands	Poland
Soviet Union	Yugoslavia

== Preliminary round ==
=== Pool 1 ===
Pos	Team	Pld	W	L	Pts	SW	SL	SR	SPW	SPL	SPR	Qualification
1	Soviet Union	2	2	0	4	6	0	MAX	90	25	3.600	Final round
2	France	2	1	1	3	3	3	1.000	54	67	0.806	Final round
3	Netherlands	2	0	2	2	0	6	0.000	38	90	0.422	

Date		Score		Set 1	Set 2	Set 3	Set 4	Set 5	Total	Report
15 Sep	France	3–0	Netherlands	15–5	15–6	15–11			45–22	Report
16 Sep	Soviet Union	3–0	Netherlands	15–4	15–3	15–9			45–16	Report
17 Sep	Soviet Union	3–0	France	15–5	15–1	15–3			45–9	Report

=== Pool 2 ===
Pos	Team	Pld	W	L	Pts	SW	SL	SR	SPW	SPL	SPR	Qualification
1	Poland	2	2	0	4	6	1	6.000	103	51	2.020	Final round
2	Yugoslavia	2	1	1	3	4	3	1.333	87	76	1.145	Final round
3	Italy	2	0	2	2	0	6	0.000	27	90	0.300	

Date		Score		Set 1	Set 2	Set 3	Set 4	Set 5	Total	Report
15 Sep	Yugoslavia	1–3	Poland	15–13	12–15	5–15	10–15		42–58	Report
16 Sep	Poland	3–0	Italy	15–5	15–1	15–3			45–9	Report
17 Sep	Yugoslavia	3–0	Italy	15–0	15–7	15–11			45–18	Report

== Final round ==
Pos	Team	Pld	W	L	Pts	SW	SL	SR	SPW	SPL	SPR
1	Soviet Union	3	3	0	6	9	0	MAX	135	33	4.091
2	Poland	3	2	1	5	6	3	2.000	114	107	1.065
3	Yugoslavia	3	1	2	4	3	6	0.500	85	123	0.691
4	France	3	0	3	3	0	9	0.000	66	137	0.482

Date		Score		Set 1	Set 2	Set 3	Set 4	Set 5	Total	Report
18 Sep	Yugoslavia	0–3	Soviet Union	1–15	4–15	0–15			5–45	Report
19 Sep	Yugoslavia	0–3	Poland	15–17	9–15	9–15			33–47	Report
20 Sep	Soviet Union	3–0	France	15–2	15–1	15–3			45–6	Report
21 Sep	Yugoslavia	3–0	France	15–8	15–8	17–15			47–31	Report
21 Sep	Soviet Union	3–0	Poland	15–8	15–3	15–11			45–22	Report
22 Sep	Poland	3–0	France	15–13	15–12	15–4			45–29	Report

== Final ranking ==
Place	Team
1st place, gold medalist(s)	Soviet Union
2nd place, silver medalist(s)	Poland
3rd place, bronze medalist(s)	Yugoslavia
4.	France
5.	Netherlands
6.	Italy

1951 Women's European champions

Soviet Union
Third title
