= Poland women's national volleyball team =

Women's national volleyball team representing Poland

Poland
- Association: Polski Związek Piłki Siatkowej
- Confederation: CEV
- Head coach: Stefano Lavarini
- FIVB ranking: 5 ▼1 (2 October 2026)

Uniforms
Home	Away	Third

Summer Olympics
- Appearances: 4 (First in 1964)
- Best result: (1964, 1968)

World Championship
- Appearances: 12 (First in 1952)
- Best result: (1952)

World Cup
- Appearances: 2 (First in 2003)
- Best result: 6th place (2007)

European Championship
- Appearances: 33 (First in 1949)
- Best result: (2003, 2005)
- www.pzps.pl (in Polish)
Honours
Event	1st	2nd	3rd
Summer Olympics	0	0	2
World Championship	0	1	2
World Cup	0	0	0
World Grand Prix	0	0	0
Nations League	0	0	3
European Championship	2	4	5
European Games	0	1	0
European League	0	0	1
Total	2	6	13
Medal record
Olympic Games
Bronze medal – third place	1964 Tokyo	Team
Bronze medal – third place	1968 Mexico	Team
World Championship
Silver medal – second place	1952 Soviet Union	
Bronze medal – third place	1956 France	
Bronze medal – third place	1962 Soviet Union	
Nations League
Bronze medal – third place	2023 United States	
Bronze medal – third place	2024 Thailand	
Bronze medal – third place	2025 Poland	
European Championship
Gold medal – first place	2003 Turkey	
Gold medal – first place	2005 Croatia	
Silver medal – second place	1950 Bulgaria	
Silver medal – second place	1951 France	
Silver medal – second place	1963 Romania	
Silver medal – second place	1967 Turkey	
Bronze medal – third place	1949 Czechoslovakia	
Bronze medal – third place	1955 Romania	
Bronze medal – third place	1958 Czechoslovakia	
Bronze medal – third place	1971 Italy	
Bronze medal – third place	2009 Poland	
European Games
Silver medal – second place	2015 Baku	Team
European League
Bronze medal – third place	2014	

The Poland women's national volleyball team (Polish: Reprezentacja Polski w piłce siatkowej kobiet) represents Poland in international volleyball competition. The team is controlled by the Polish Volleyball Federation (Polski Związek Piłki Siatkowej, PZPS), the governing body for volleyball in Poland, which represents the country in international competitions and friendly matches.

Poland's greatest achievements to date have been winning bronze medals at the 1964 and the 1968 Summer Olympics, silver medal at the 1952 World Championship as well as gold medals at the 2003 and the 2005 European Championship.

The Polish national team is ranked 5th in the FIVB world ranking as of 11 October 2026.

== Results ==
=== Summer Olympics ===
Champions Runners-up Third place Fourth place

Summer Olympics record
Year	Round	Position	Pld	W	L	SW	SL	Squad
(Japan) 1964	Round robin	Third place	5	3	2	10	6	Squad
(Mexico) 1968	Round robin	Third place	7	5	2	15	11	Squad
(West Germany) 1972	did not qualify							
(Canada) 1976	did not qualify							
(Soviet Union) 1980	did not qualify							
(United States) 1984	did not qualify							
(South Korea) 1988	did not qualify							
(Spain) 1992	did not qualify							
(United States) 1996	did not qualify							
(Australia) 2000	did not qualify							
(Greece) 2004	did not qualify							
(China) 2008	Group stage	9th place	5	1	4	9	12	Squad
(United Kingdom) 2012	did not qualify							
(Brazil) 2016	did not qualify							
(Japan) 2020	did not qualify							
(France) 2024	Quarterfinals	6th place	4	2	2	6	7	Squad
(United States) 2028	to be determined							
(Australia) 2032	to be determined							
Total	0 Title(s)	4/18	21	11	10	40	36	—

=== World Championship ===
Champions Runners-up Third place Fourth place

World Championship record
Year	Round	Position	Pld	W	L	SW	SL	Squad
(Soviet Union) 1952	Final round	Runners Up						Squad
(France) 1956	Final round	Third Place						Squad
(Brazil) 1960	Final round	4th Place						Squad
(Soviet Union) 1962	Final round	Third Place						Squad
(Japan) 1967	did not enter							
(Bulgaria) 1970	9th–16th places	9th Place						Squad
(Mexico) 1974	7th–12th places	9th Place						Squad
(Soviet Union) 1978	9th–12th places	11th Place						Squad
(Peru) 1982	did not qualify							
(Czechoslovakia) 1986	did not qualify							
(China) 1990	did not qualify							
(Brazil) 1994	did not qualify							
(Japan) 1998	did not qualify							
(Germany) 2002	First round	15th Place						Squad
(Japan) 2006	Second round	15th Place						Squad
(Japan) 2010	9th–12th places	9th Place	11	7	4	24	17	Squad
(Italy) 2014	did not qualify							
(Japan) 2018	did not qualify							
(Netherlands) (Poland) 2022	Quarterfinals	7th Place	10	6	4	23	17	Squad
(Thailand) 2025	Quarterfinals	7th Place	5	4	1	12	9	Squad
(Canada) (United States) 2027	Qualified							
(Philippines) 2029	to be determined							
Total	0 Titles	13/22						—

=== European Championship ===
Champions Runners-up Third place Fourth place

European Championship record
Year	Round	Position	Pld	W	L	SW	SL	Squad
(Czechoslovakia) 1949	Round Robin	Third Place	6	4	2	12	6	Squad
(Bulgaria) 1950	Round Robin	Runners Up	5	4	1	12	4	Squad
(France) 1951	Round Robin	Runners Up	5	4	1	12	4	Squad
(Romania) 1955	Round Robin	Third Place	5	3	2	12	10	Squad
(Czechoslovakia) 1958	Round Robin	Third Place	9	7	2	25	10	Squad
(Romania) 1963	Round Robin	Runners Up	9	8	1	26	8	Squad
(Turkey) 1967	Round Robin	Runners Up	10	9	1	27	9	Squad
(Italy) 1971	Round Robin	Third Place	7	5	2	15	8	Squad
(Socialist Federal Republic of Yugoslavia) 1975	Final Round	11th Place	8	2	6	14	19	Squad
(Finland) 1977	Semi-finals	4th Place	7	4	3	14	10	Squad
(France) 1979	Final Round	8th Place	8	6	2	18	11	Squad
(Bulgaria) 1981	Final Round	5th Place	8	3	5	10	18	Squad
(East Germany) 1983	Final Round	9th Place	8	6	2	19	12	Squad
(Netherlands) 1985	Final Round	7th Place	8	5	3	17	9	Squad
(Belgium) 1987	Final Round	11th Place	7	2	5	7	16	Squad
(West Germany) 1989	Final Round	9th Place	7	3	4	11	15	Squad

European Championship record
Year	Round	Position	Pld	W	L	SW	SL	Squad
(Italy) 1991	Preliminary	9th Place	5	1	4	6	14	Squad
(Czech Republic) 1993	did not qualify							
(Netherlands) 1995	Preliminary	9th Place	5	1	4	7	13	Squad
(Czech Republic) 1997	Final Round	8th Place	7	4	3	13	10	Squad
(Italy) 1999	Final Round	6th Place	5	1	4	7	14	Squad
(Bulgaria) 2001	Final Round	6th Place	7	3	4	14	13	Squad
(Turkey) 2003	Final Round	Champions	7	6	1	19	11	Squad
(Croatia) 2005	Final Round	Champions	7	7	0	21	7	Squad
(Belgium) / (Luxembourg) 2007	Semi-finals	4th Place	10	8	2	25	13	Squad
(Poland) 2009	Semi-finals	Third Place	10	7	3	22	16	Squad
(Italy) / (Serbia) 2011	Quarter Finals	5th Place	4	3	1	9	3	Squad
(Germany) / (Switzerland) 2013	Playoffs	11th Place	4	1	3	6	10	Squad
(Netherlands) 2015	Quarter Finals	8th Place	5	2	3	9	11	Squad
(Azerbaijan) (Georgia (country)) 2017	Playoffs	10th Place	4	2	2	7	9	Squad
(Hungary) / (Poland) / (Slovakia) / (Turkey) 2019	Semi-finals	4th Place	9	6	3	21	14	Squad
(Serbia) / (Bulgaria) / (Croatia) / (Romania) 2021	Quarter Finals	5th Place	7	5	2	16	9	Squad
(Belgium) / (Italy) / (Germany) / (Estonia) 2023	Quarter Finals	5th Place	7	5	2	16	8	Squad
(Azerbaijan) / (Czech Republic) / (Sweden) / (Turkey) 2026	Semi-finals	4th Place	9	7	2	23	10	Squad
(Spain) 2028	To be determined							
Total	2 Titles	33/35	229	144	85	492	354	—

=== World Cup ===
Champions Runners-up Third place Fourth place

World Cup record
Year	Round	Position	Pld	W	L	SW	SL	Squad
(Uruguay) 1973	did not qualify							
(Japan) 1977	did not qualify							
(Japan) 1981	did not qualify							
(Japan) 1985	did not qualify							
(Japan) 1989	did not qualify							
(Japan) 1991	did not qualify							
(Japan) 1995	did not qualify							
(Japan) 1999	did not qualify							
(Japan) 2003		8th Place	11	5	6	18	22	Squad
(Japan) 2007		6th Place	11	6	5	23	18	Squad
(Japan) 2011	did not qualify							
(Japan) 2015	did not qualify							
(Japan) 2019	did not qualify							
(Japan) 2023	did not qualify							
Total	0 Titles	2/14	22	11	11	41	40	—

=== World Grand Prix ===
Champions Runners-up Third place Fourth place

World Grand Prix record
Year	Round	Position	Pld	W	L	SW	SL	Squad
(Hong Kong) 1993	did not enter							
(China) 1994	did not enter							
(China) 1995	did not enter							
(China) 1996	did not enter							
(Japan) 1997	did not enter							
(Hong Kong) 1998	did not enter							
(China) 1999	did not enter							
(Philippines) 2000	did not enter							
(Macau) 2001	did not enter							
(Hong Kong) 2002	did not enter							
(Italy) 2003	did not enter							
(Italy) 2004		8th Place						Squad
(Japan) 2005		7th Place						Squad
(Italy) 2006		12th Place						Squad
(China) 2007		6th Place						Squad
(Japan) 2008		10th Place						Squad
(Japan) 2009		7th Place						Squad
(China) 2010		6th Place						Squad
(Macau) 2011		10th Place						Squad
(China) 2012		8th Place						Squad
(Japan) 2013		15th Place						Squad
(Japan) 2014		16th Place						Squad
(United States) 2015		14th place						Squad
(Thailand) 2016		14th place						Squad
(China) 2017		13th place						Squad
Total	0 Titles	14/25						—

=== Nations League ===
Champions Runners up Third place Fourth place

Nations League record
Year	Round	Position	Pld	W	L	SW	SL	Squad
(China) 2018	Preliminary Round	9th place	15	8	7	29	29	Squad
(China) 2019	Final Round	5th place	17	9	8	36	35	Squad
(Italy) 2021	Preliminary Round	11th place	15	5	10	24	36	Squad
(Turkey) 2022	Preliminary Round	13th place	12	4	8	18	29	Squad
(United States) 2023	Semifinals	Third place	15	12	3	38	19	Squad
(Thailand) 2024	Semifinals	Third place	15	12	3	37	15	Squad
(Poland) 2025	Semifinals	Third place	15	11	4	37	21	Squad
(Macau) 2026	Preliminary Round	9th place	12	7	5	28	23	Squad
(N/A) 2027	qualified							
Total	0 Titles	9/9	116	68	48	247	207	

=== European League ===
- 2014 – (bronze) 3rd place

=== European Games ===
- 2015 Baku – (silver) 2nd place

== Team ==
=== Current squad ===
Roster for the 2024 Summer Olympics. The roster was announced on 6 July 2024.

Head coach: (Italy) Stefano Lavarini

- 1 Maria Stenzel L
- 3 Klaudia Alagierska MB
- 5 Agnieszka Korneluk MB
- 9 Magdalena Stysiak OP
- 11 Martyna Łukasik OH
- 12 Aleksandra Szczygłowska L
- 14 Joanna Wołosz (c) S
- 15 Martyna Czyrniańska OH
- 17 Malwina Smarzek OP
- 26 Katarzyna Wenerska S
- 41 Natalia Mędrzyk OH
- 95 Magdalena Jurczyk MB

=== Coach history ===
- (Poland) 1948–1948 – Walenty Kłyszejko
- (Poland) 1948–1949 – Romuald Wirszyłło
- (Poland) 1949–1950 – Lothar Geyer
- (Poland) 1950–1951 – Kazimierz Strycharzewski
- (Poland) 1951–1954 – Zygmunt Krzyżanowski
- (Poland) 1954–1955 – Lucjan Tyszecki
- (Poland) 1955–1957 – Zygmunt Krzyżanowski
- (Poland) 1957–1959 – Zbigniew Szpyt
- (Poland) 1959–1961 – Jerzy Szewczyk
- (Poland) 1961–1962 – Stanisław Mazur
- (Poland) 1962–1965 – Stanisław Poburka
- (Poland) 1965–1970 – Benedykt Krysik
- (Poland) 1970–1970 – Gwidon Grochowski
- (Poland) 1971–1974 – Zygmunt Krzyżanowski
- (Poland) 1974–1975 – Adam Żelazny
- (Poland) 1975–1978 – Andrzej Niemczyk
- (Poland) 1978–1980 – Hubert Jerzy Wagner
- (Poland) 1980–1981 – Stanisław Poburka
- (Poland) 1981–1983 – Andrzej Dulski
- (Poland) 1984–1986 – Jerzy Matlak
- (Poland) 1986–1988 – Jan Ryś
- (Poland) 1989–1989 – Janusz Badora
- (Poland) 1989–1993 – Edward Superlak
- (Poland) 1994–1995 – Tadeusz Chojnacki
- (Poland) 1995–1996 – Leszek Piasecki
- (Poland) 1996–2000 – Jerzy Skrobecki
- (Poland) 2000–2003 – Zbigniew Krzyżanowski
- (Poland) 2003–2006 – Andrzej Niemczyk
- (Poland) 2006–2007 – Ireneusz Kłos
- (Italy) 2007–2008 – Marco Bonitta
- (Poland) 2009–2011 – Jerzy Matlak
- (Poland) 2011–2011 – Wiesław Popik
- (Poland) 2011–2012 – Alojzy Świderek
- (Poland) 2013–2015 – Piotr Makowski
- (Poland) 2015–2021 – Jacek Nawrocki
- (Italy) 2022–present – Stefano Lavarini
