= Lazara González =

Cuban volleyball player

Lázara González

Personal information
- Full name: Lázara González Martínez
- Born: 17 December 1964 (age 61); Havana, Cuba
- Height: 1.78 m (5 ft 10 in)

Volleyball information
- Position: Middle blocker
- Number: 10

National team
1982–1990	Cuba
Honours
Women's volleyball
Representing Cuba
World Championship
Silver medal – second place	1986 Czechoslovakia	Team
FIVB World Cup
Silver medal – second place	1985 Japan
Friendship Games
Gold medal – first place	1984 Varna
Pan American Games
Gold medal – first place	1983 Caracas	Team
Gold medal – first place	1987 Indianapolis	Team

Lázara González Martínez (born 17 December 1964), also known as Lázara González, is a Cuban former volleyball player who played for the Cuban women's national volleyball team. Martínez won silver medals at the 1985 FIVB World Cup in Japan and the 1986 FIVB World Championship in Czechoslovakia. She also won gold medals at the 1983 Pan American Games in Caracas and the 1987 Pan American Games in Indianapolis.
