= María Teresa Santamaría =

Cuban volleyball player

Personal information
- Full name: María Teresa Santamaría
- Nationality: Cuban
- Height: 1.83 m (6 ft 0 in)

Volleyball information
- Position: Middle blocker
- Number: 6

National team
1985–1987	Cuba
Honours
Women's volleyball
Representing Cuba
World Championship
Silver medal – second place	1986 Czechoslovakia	Team
FIVB World Cup
Silver medal – second place	1985 Japan
Pan American Games
Gold medal – first place	1987 Indianapolis	Team

María Teresa Santamaría is a Cuban former volleyball player who played on the Cuban women's national volleyball team. While representing Cuba, she won silver medals at the 1985 FIVB World Cup in Japan and the 1986 FIVB World Championship in Czechoslovakia, and a gold medal at the 1987 Pan American Games in Indianapolis.

== Personal life ==
While playing with the Cuban team, Santamaría married Cuban men's national volleyball player Joël Despaigne.
