= Norka Latamblet =

Cuban volleyball player

Personal information
- Full name: Norka Latamblet Daudinot
- Born: 4 October 1963 (age 63); Baracoa, Cuba
- Height: 1.84 m (6 ft 0 in)

Volleyball information
- Position: Outside hitter
- Number: 12

National team
1981–1993	Cuba
Honours
Women's volleyball
Representing Cuba
Olympic Games
Gold medal – first place	1992 Barcelona	Team
World Championship
Silver medal – second place	1986 Czechoslovakia	Team
FIVB World Cup
Gold medal – first place	1989 Japan
Gold medal – first place	1991 Japan
Silver medal – second place	1985 Japan
FIVB World Grand Prix
Gold medal – first place	1993 Hong Kong
Friendship Games
Gold medal – first place	1984 Varna
Pan American Games
Gold medal – first place	1983 Caracas	Team
Gold medal – first place	1987 Indianapolis	Team
Gold medal – first place	1991 Havana	Team
Central American and Caribbean Games
Gold medal – first place	1982 Havana	Team
Gold medal – first place	1990 Mexico City	Team
Gold medal – first place	1993 Ponce	Team

Norka Latamblet Daudinot (born 4 October 1963), also known as Norka Latamblet, is a former volleyball player from Cuba who played with the Cuban women's national volleyball team and won a gold medal at the 1992 Summer Olympics in Barcelona. She was originally a setter and became an outside hitter.

While representing Cuba, Latamblet won a silver medal at the 1986 FIVB World Championship in Czechoslovakia. She also won gold medals at the 1989 and 1991 FIVB World Cups in Japan.

Latamblet also helped the Cuban national team win gold medals at the 1983, 1987, and 1991 Pan American Games.
