= Ana María Hourrutinier =

Cuban volleyball player

Personal information
- Full name: Ana Luisa Hourrutinier Dorcine
- Born: 18 September; Holguín, Cuba
- Height: 1.75 m (5 ft 9 in)

Volleyball information
- Position: Outside hitter
- Number: 7

National team
1983–1987	Cuba
Honours
Women's volleyball
Representing Cuba
World Championship
Silver medal – second place	1986 Czechoslovakia	Team
FIVB World Cup
Silver medal – second place	1985 Japan
Pan American Games
Gold medal – first place	1983 Caracas	Team
Gold medal – first place	1987 Indianapolis	Team
Central American and Caribbean Games
Gold medal – first place	1986 Santiago de los Caballeros	Team

Ana María Hourrutinier, also known as Ana Luisa Hourrutinier Dorcine, is a Cuban former volleyball player who played with the Cuban women's national volleyball team and won gold medals at the 1983 Pan American Games in Caracas and the 1987 Pan American Games in Indianapolis. She also won silver medals with the Cuban team at the 1985 FIVB World Cup in Japan and the 1986 FIVB World Championship in Czechoslovakia.
