= 1986 FIVB Women's Volleyball World Championship squads =

Women's world championship

This article shows the participating team squads at the 1986 FIVB Women's World Championship, held from 2 to 13 September in Czechoslovakia.

== China ==
Coach: Zhang Rongfang

No.	Name	Date of birth	Height	Weight
1	Liu Wei			
2	Liang Yan			
3	Hu Xiaofeng			
4	Hou Yuzhu			
5	Yin Qin			
6	Yang Xilan			
7	Su Huijuan			
8	Jiang Ying			
9	Li Yanjun			
10	Yang Xiaojun			
11	Zheng Meizhu			
12	Wu Dan			

== Cuba ==
Coach: Laeita

No.	Name	Date of birth	Height	Weight
1	Tania Ortiz			
2	Mireya Luis			
4	Inesma Molinet			
5	Nancy González			
6	María Teresa Santamaría			
7	Ana María Hourrutinier			
9	Josefina Capote			
10	Lazara González			
11	Josefina O'Farrill			
12	Norka Latamblet			
14	Ana María García			
15	Magaly Carvajal			

== Peru ==
Coach:Mambo Bok Park

No.	Name	Date of birth	Height	Weight
1	Sonia Ayaucán			
2	Cenaida Uribe			
3	Rosa García			
4	Miriam Gallardo			
5	Gabriela Pérez del Solar			
6	Sonia Heredia			
7	Cecilia Tait			
8	Luisa Cervera			
9	Denisse Fajardo			
10	Ana Arostegui			
11	Gina Torrealva			
12	Natalia Málaga			

== East Germany ==
No.	Name	Date of birth	Height	Weight
2	Ute Bitterlich			
3	Monika Beu			
4	Ariane Radfan			
5	Kathrin Langschwager			
6	Maike Arlt			
7	Anke Lindemann			
8	Ute Oldenburg			
9	Heike Jensen			
10	Dorte Studemann			
11	Ramona Landgraf			
13	Rank			
14	Ute Landgenau			

== Brazil ==
No.	Name	Date of birth	Height	Weight
	Maria Isabel Barroso Salgado Alencar	02.08.60	1.80 m (5 ft 11 in)	71 lb (32 kg)
9	Regina Pereira de Mendonca Uchoa	20.09.59	1.79 m (5 ft 10 in)	67 lb (30 kg)
4	Vera Helena Bonetti Mossa	27.09.64	1.83 m (6 ft 0 in)	62 lb (28 kg)
	Ana Cláudia da Silva Ramos	31.10.61	1.79 m (5 ft 10 in)	66 lb (30 kg)
	Roseli Ana Timm	25.07.62		
	Eliani "Lica" Miranda da Costa	05.08.69		
	Sandra Maria Lima Suruagy	17.04.61		
	Vânia Mello			
	Ana Margarida Ida Vieira Alvares	22.01.65		
	Denise Ferreira de Souza	02.09.67	1.83 m (6 ft 0 in)	77 lb (35 kg)
	Ana Lúcia de Camargo Barros	16.12.65	1.76 m (5 ft 9 in)	71 lb (32 kg)
	Adriana Samuel Ramos	12.04.66		

== Soviet Union ==
Coach:Vladimir Patkin

No.	Name	Date of birth	Height	Weight
	Yelena Volkova	13.06.60	1.90 m (6 ft 3 in)	
	Svetlana Badulina	26.10.60	1.77 m (5 ft 10 in)	
	Valentina Ogienko	26.05.65	1.82 m (6 ft 0 in)	72 lb (33 kg)
	Elena Chebukina	11.10.65	1.88 m (6 ft 2 in)	77 lb (35 kg)
	Diana Kachalova			
	Olga Krivosheyeva	15.05.61	1.80 m (5 ft 11 in)	
	Irina Gorbatyuk			
	Yuliya Saltsevich	12.05.67	1.97 m (6 ft 6 in)	
	Elena Kundaleva			
	Marina Kiryakova			
	Svetlana Likholetova			
	Irina Rizen			

== Japan ==
No.	Name	Date of birth	Height	Weight

== South Korea ==
No.	Name	Date of birth	Height	Weight

== Italy ==
No.	Name	Date of birth	Height	Weight

== United States ==
No.	Name	Date of birth	Height	Weight

== Czechoslovakia ==
Coach: Vladimír Hančík

No.	Name	Date of birth	Height	Weight
	Baráková			
	Bromová			
	Daniela Cuníková			
	Eva Dostálová			
	Dvoráková			
	Vladěna Holubová			
	Homolková			
	Stanislava Králová			
	Táňa Krempaská			
	Lajcáková			
	Simona Mandelová			
	Lucie Vaclavikova			

== Bulgaria ==
No.	Name	Date of birth	Height	Weight

== West Germany ==
No.	Name	Date of birth	Height	Weight
	Ursula Jakob			
	Silke Meyer			
	Gudrun Witte			
	Beate Buehler			
	Gudula Staub			
	Sigrid Terstegge			
	Michaela Vosveck			
	Renate Riek			
	Karen Baumeister			
	Constanze Wolter			
	Alexandra Ludwig			
	Terry Place-Brandel			
	Beate Muensterkoetter			
	Ute Hankers			
	Juliane Schlipf			

== North Korea ==
No.	Name	Date of birth	Height	Weight

== Canada ==
No.	Name	Date of birth	Height	Weight

== Tunisia ==
No.	Name	Date of birth	Height	Weight
