= Josefina O'Farrill =

Cuban volleyball player

Personal information
- Full name: Josefina O’Farrill Fonseca
- Born: 9 December 1963 (age 62); Cerro, Havana, Cuba
- Height: 1.84 m (6 ft 0 in)

Volleyball information
- Position: Setter
- Number: 11

National team
1982–1990	Cuba
Honours
Women's volleyball
Representing Cuba
World Championship
Silver medal – second place	1986 Czechoslovakia	Team
FIVB World Cup
Gold medal – first place	1989 Japan
Silver medal – second place	1985 Japan
Friendship Games
Gold medal – first place	1984 Varna
Pan American Games
Gold medal – first place	1983 Caracas	Team
Gold medal – first place	1987 Indianapolis	Team

Josefina O'Farrill (born 9 December 1963) is a Cuban former volleyball player who played on the Cuban women's national volleyball team. While representing Cuba, O'Farrill won gold medals at the 1983 Pan American Games in Caracas and the 1987 Pan American Games in Indianapolis, as well as at the 1989 FIVB World Cup in Japan. She also won a silver medal with the Cuban team at the 1986 FIVB World Championship in Czechoslovakia. She was a setter.
