= Tania Ortiz =

Cuban volleyball player

Personal information
- Full name: Tania Ortiz Calvo
- Born: 30 October 1965 (age 61); Vertientes, Camagüey Province, Cuba
- Height: 1.80 m (5 ft 11 in)

Volleyball information
- Position: Setter
- Number: 1

National team
1985–1994	Cuba
Honours
Women's volleyball
Representing Cuba
Olympic Games
Gold medal – first place	1992 Barcelona	Team
World Championship
Gold medal – first place	1994 Brazil	Team
Silver medal – second place	1986 Czechoslovakia	Team
FIVB World Cup
Gold medal – first place	1989 Japan
Gold medal – first place	1991 Japan
Silver medal – second place	1985 Japan
FIVB World Grand Prix
Gold medal – first place	1993 Hong Kong
Silver medal – second place	1994 Shanghai
World Grand Champions Cup
Gold medal – first place	1993 Japan
Pan American Games
Gold medal – first place	1991 Havana	Team
Central American and Caribbean Games
Gold medal – first place	1986 Santiago de los Caballeros	Team
Gold medal – first place	1990 Mexico City	Team

Tania Ortiz Calvo (born 30 October 1965), also known as Tania Ortiz, is a former volleyball player who played for the Cuban women's national volleyball team and won a gold medal at the 1992 Summer Olympics in Barcelona. She was a setter.

== World Championships ==
Ortiz also helped the Cuban national team win the silver medal at the 1986 FIVB World Championship in Czechoslovakia and the gold medal at the 1994 FIVB World Championship in Brazil, where they did not lose a set in the entire tournament.

== World Cups ==
Ortiz won a silver medal at the 1985 FIVB World Cup in Japan, and gold medals at the 1989 and 1991 FIVB World Cups in Japan.
