= List of indoor volleyball world medalists =

This list is of those countries who have won an indoor volleyball world medal, referring to any of the Men's and Women's World Championship, Men's and Women's World Cup, Olympic Games, men's and women's Volleyball Nations League (replacing FIVB World League and FIVB World Grand Prix respectively) or FIVB Volleyball World Grand Champions Cup.

== Men's Volleyball World Medalists ==
| World Championship |
| Olympic Games |
| World Cup (Discontinued) |
| World Grand Champions Cup (Discontinued) |

=== 1949–1989 ===
| Year | Host | Gold | Silver | Bronze |
|---|---|---|---|---|
| 1949 | Czechoslovakia | Soviet Union | Czechoslovakia | Bulgaria |
| 1952 | Soviet Union | Soviet Union | Czechoslovakia | Bulgaria |
| 1956 | France | Czechoslovakia | Romania | Soviet Union |
| 1960 | Brazil | Soviet Union | Czechoslovakia | Romania |
| 1962 | Soviet Union | Soviet Union | Czechoslovakia | Romania |
| 1964 | Japan | Soviet Union | Czechoslovakia | Japan |
| 1965 | Poland | Soviet Union | Poland | Czechoslovakia |
| 1966 | Czechoslovakia | Czechoslovakia | Romania | Soviet Union |
| 1968 | Mexico | Soviet Union | Japan | Czechoslovakia |
| 1969 | East Germany | East Germany | Japan | Soviet Union |
| 1970 | Bulgaria | East Germany | Bulgaria | Japan |
| 1972 | Germany | Japan | East Germany | Soviet Union |
| 1974 | Mexico | Poland | Soviet Union | Japan |
| 1976 | Canada | Poland | Soviet Union | Cuba |
| 1977 | Japan | Soviet Union | Japan | Cuba |
| 1978 | Italy | Soviet Union | Italy | Cuba |
| 1980 | Soviet Union | Soviet Union | Bulgaria | Romania |
| 1981 | Japan | Soviet Union | Cuba | Brazil |
| 1982 | Argentina | Soviet Union | Brazil | Argentina |
| 1984 | United States | United States | Brazil | Italy |
| 1985 | Japan | United States | Soviet Union | Czechoslovakia |
| 1986 | France | United States | Soviet Union | Bulgaria |
| 1988 | South Korea | United States | Soviet Union | Argentina |
| 1989 | Japan | Cuba | Italy | Soviet Union |

=== 1990–present ===
==== World League (1990–2017) ====
| Year | World League Host | Gold | Silver | Bronze | Host | Gold | Silver | Bronze |
|---|---|---|---|---|---|---|---|---|
| 1990 | Osaka | Italy | Netherlands | Brazil | Brazil | Italy | Cuba | Soviet Union |
| 1991 | Milan | Italy | Cuba | Soviet Union | Japan | Soviet Union | Cuba | United States |
| 1992 | Genoa | Italy | Cuba | United States | Spain | Brazil | Netherlands | United States |
| 1993 | São Paulo | Brazil | Russia | Italy | Japan | Italy | Brazil | Cuba |
| 1994 | Milan | Italy | Cuba | Brazil | Greece | Italy | Netherlands | United States |
| 1995 | Rio de Janeiro | Italy | Brazil | Cuba | Japan | Italy | Netherlands | Brazil |
| 1996 | Rotterdam | Netherlands | Italy | Russia | United States | Netherlands | Italy | (Federal Republic of Yugoslavia) Yugoslavia |
| 1997 | Moscow | Italy | Cuba | Russia | Japan | Brazil | Netherlands | Cuba |
| 1998 | Milan | Cuba | Russia | Netherlands | Japan | Italy | (Federal Republic of Yugoslavia) Yugoslavia | Cuba |
| 1999 | Mar del Plata | Italy | Cuba | Brazil | Japan | Russia | Cuba | Italy |
| 2000 | Rotterdam | Italy | Russia | Brazil | Australia | (Federal Republic of Yugoslavia) Yugoslavia | Russia | Italy |
| 2001 | Katowice | Brazil | Italy | Russia | Japan | Cuba | Brazil | (Federal Republic of Yugoslavia) Yugoslavia |
| 2002 | Belo Horizonte | Russia | Brazil | (Federal Republic of Yugoslavia) Yugoslavia | Argentina | Brazil | Russia | France |
| 2003 | Madrid | Brazil | (Serbia and Montenegro) Serbia | Italy | Japan | Brazil | Italy | (Serbia and Montenegro) Serbia |
| 2004 | Rome | Brazil | Italy | (Serbia and Montenegro) Serbia | Greece | Brazil | Italy | Russia |
| 2005 | Belgrade | Brazil | (Serbia and Montenegro) Serbia | Cuba | Japan | Brazil | United States | Italy |
| 2006 | Moscow | Brazil | France | Russia | Japan | Brazil | Poland | Bulgaria |
| 2007 | Katowice | Brazil | Russia | United States | Japan | Brazil | Russia | Bulgaria |
| 2008 | Rio de Janeiro | United States | Serbia | Russia | China | United States | Brazil | Russia |
| 2009 | Belgrade | Brazil | Serbia | Russia | Japan | Brazil | Cuba | Japan |
| 2010 | Córdoba | Brazil | Russia | Serbia | Italy | Brazil | Cuba | Serbia |
| 2011 | Gdańsk | Russia | Brazil | Poland | Japan | Russia | Poland | Brazil |
| 2012 | Sofia | Poland | United States | Cuba | Great Britain | Russia | Brazil | Italy |
| 2013 | Mar del Plata | Russia | Brazil | Italy | Japan | Brazil | Russia | Italy |
| 2014 | Florence | United States | Brazil | Italy | Poland | Poland | Brazil | Germany |
| 2015 | Rio de Janeiro | France | Serbia | United States | Japan | United States | Italy | Poland |
| 2016 | Kraków | Serbia | Brazil | France | Brazil | Brazil | Italy | United States |
| 2017 | Curitiba | France | Brazil | Canada | Japan | Brazil | Italy | Iran |

==== Volleyball Nations League (2018–present) ====
| Year | VNL Host | Gold | Silver | Bronze | Host | Gold | Silver | Bronze |
|---|---|---|---|---|---|---|---|---|
| 2018 | Lille | Russia | France | United States | Italy–Bulgaria | Poland | Brazil | United States |
| 2019 | Chicago | Russia | United States | Poland | Japan | Brazil | Poland | United States |
| 2021 | Rimini | Brazil | Poland | France | Japan | France | Russia | Argentina |
| 2022 | Bologna | France | United States | Poland | Poland–Slovenia | Italy | Poland | Brazil |
| 2023 | Gdansk | Poland | United States | Japan | Japan (Note: The 2023 World Cup is only a part of 2023 FIVB Volleyball Men's Olympic Qualification Tournaments.) | | | |
| 2024 | Łódź | France | Japan | Poland | France | France | Poland | United States |
| 2025 | Ningbo | Poland | Italy | Brazil | Philippines | Italy | Bulgaria | Poland |
| 2026 | Ningbo | Poland | United States | Slovenia | | | | |

== Men's Medals summary ==
=== Medals Summary Excluding World League and Volleyball Nations League ===
| Rank | Nation | Gold | Silver | Bronze | Total |
|---|---|---|---|---|---|
| 1 | Russia^{[a]} | 16 | 10 | 8 | 34 |
| 2 | Brazil | 14 | 8 | 4 | 26 |
| 3 | Italy | 7 | 8 | 6 | 21 |
| 4 | United States | 6 | 1 | 7 | 14 |
| 5 | Poland | 4 | 6 | 2 | 12 |
| 6 | Cuba | 2 | 6 | 6 | 14 |
| 7 | Czech Republic^{[b]} | 2 | 5 | 3 | 10 |
| 8 | Germany^{[c]} | 2 | 1 | 1 | 4 |
| 9 | France | 2 | 0 | 1 | 3 |
| 10 | Netherlands | 1 | 4 | 0 | 5 |
| 11 | Japan | 1 | 3 | 4 | 8 |
| 12 | Serbia^{[d]} | 1 | 1 | 4 | 6 |
| 13 | Bulgaria | 0 | 3 | 5 | 8 |
| 14 | Romania | 0 | 2 | 3 | 5 |
| 15 | Argentina | 0 | 0 | 3 | 3 |
| 16 | Iran | 0 | 0 | 1 | 1 |
| Totals (16 entries) | | 58 | 58 | 58 | 174 |

=== World League and Volleyball Nations League Medals Summary ===
| Rank | Nation | Gold | Silver | Bronze | Total |
|---|---|---|---|---|---|
| 1 | Brazil | 10 | 7 | 5 | 22 |
| 2 | Italy | 8 | 4 | 4 | 16 |
| 3 | Russia^{[a]} | 5 | 5 | 7 | 17 |
| 4 | France | 4 | 2 | 2 | 8 |
| 5 | Poland | 4 | 1 | 4 | 9 |
| 6 | United States | 2 | 5 | 4 | 11 |
| 7 | Cuba | 1 | 5 | 3 | 9 |
| 7 | Serbia^{[d]} | 1 | 5 | 3 | 9 |
| 9 | Netherlands | 1 | 1 | 1 | 3 |
| 10 | Japan | 0 | 1 | 1 | 2 |
| 11 | Canada | 0 | 0 | 1 | 1 |
| 11 | Slovenia | 0 | 0 | 1 | 1 |
| Totals (12 entries) | | 36 | 36 | 36 | 108 |

- ^[a] FIVB considers Russia (Since 1993) as the inheritor of the records of Soviet Union (1948–1991) and CIS (1992).
- ^[b] FIVB considers Czech Republic (Since 1994) as the inheritor of the records of Czechoslovakia (1948–1993).
- ^[c] After German reunification, West Germany (1949–1990) was renamed Germany (Since 1991) and they absorbed East Germany (1949–1990) with the records.
- ^[d] FIVB considers Serbia (Since 2007) as the inheritor of the records of SFR Yugoslavia (1948–1991), FR Yugoslavia (1992–2002) and Serbia and Montenegro (2003–2006).

== Women's Volleyball World Medalists ==
| World Championship |
| Olympic Games |
| World Cup |
| World Grand Champions Cup |

=== 1952–1992 ===
| Year | Host | Gold | Silver | Bronze |
|---|---|---|---|---|
| 1952 | Soviet Union | Soviet Union | Poland | Czechoslovakia |
| 1956 | France | Soviet Union | Romania | Poland |
| 1960 | Brazil | Soviet Union | Japan | Czechoslovakia |
| 1962 | Soviet Union | Japan | Soviet Union | Poland |
| 1964 | Japan | Japan | Soviet Union | Poland |
| 1967 | Japan | Japan | United States | South Korea |
| 1968 | Mexico | Soviet Union | Japan | Poland |
| 1970 | Bulgaria | Soviet Union | Japan | North Korea |
| 1972 | Germany | Soviet Union | Japan | North Korea |
| 1973 | Uruguay | Soviet Union | Japan | South Korea |
| 1974 | Mexico | Japan | Soviet Union | South Korea |
| 1976 | Canada | Japan | Soviet Union | South Korea |
| 1977 | Japan | Japan | Cuba | South Korea |
| 1978 | Soviet Union | Cuba | Japan | Soviet Union |
| 1980 | Soviet Union | Soviet Union | East Germany | Bulgaria |
| 1981 | Japan | China | Japan | Soviet Union |
| 1982 | Peru | China | Peru | United States |
| 1984 | United States | China | United States | Japan |
| 1985 | Japan | China | Cuba | Soviet Union |
| 1986 | Czechoslovakia | China | Cuba | Peru |
| 1988 | South Korea | Soviet Union | Peru | China |
| 1989 | Japan | Cuba | Soviet Union | China |
| 1990 | China | Soviet Union | China | United States |
| 1991 | Japan | Cuba | China | Soviet Union |
| 1992 | Spain | Cuba | Unified Team | United States |

=== 1993–2017 ===
==== World Grand Prix (1993–2017) ====
| Year | World Grand Prix Host | Gold | Silver | Bronze | Host | Gold | Silver | Bronze |
|---|---|---|---|---|---|---|---|---|
| 1993 | Hong Kong | Cuba | China | Russia | Japan | Cuba | China | Russia |
| 1994 | Shanghai | Brazil | Cuba | China | Brazil | Cuba | Brazil | Russia |
| 1995 | Shanghai | United States | Brazil | Cuba | Japan | Cuba | Brazil | China |
| 1996 | Shanghai | Brazil | Cuba | Russia | United States | Cuba | China | Brazil |
| 1997 | Kobe | Russia | Cuba | South Korea | Japan | Russia | Cuba | Brazil |
| 1998 | Hong Kong | Brazil | Russia | Cuba | Japan | Cuba | China | Russia |
| 1999 | Yuxi | Russia | Brazil | China | Japan | Cuba | Russia | Brazil |
| 2000 | Quezon City | Cuba | Russia | Brazil | Australia | Cuba | Russia | Brazil |
| 2001 | Macau | United States | China | Russia | Japan | China | Russia | Japan |
| 2002 | Hong Kong | Russia | China | Germany | Germany | Italy | United States | Russia |
| 2003 | Andria | China | Russia | United States | Japan | China | Brazil | United States |
| 2004 | Reggio Calabria | Brazil | Italy | United States | Greece | China | Russia | Cuba |
| 2005 | Sendai | Brazil | Italy | China | Japan | Brazil | United States | China |
| 2006 | Reggio Calabria | Brazil | Russia | Italy | Japan | Russia | Brazil | (Federal Republic of Yugoslavia) Serbia |
| 2007 | Ningbo | Netherlands | China | Italy | Japan | Italy | Brazil | United States |
| 2008 | Yukohama | Brazil | Cuba | Italy | China | Brazil | United States | China |
| 2009 | Tokyo | Brazil | Russia | Germany | Japan | Italy | Brazil | Dominican Republic |
| 2010 | Ningbo | United States | Brazil | Italy | Japan | Russia | Brazil | Japan |
| 2011 | Macau | United States | Brazil | Serbia | Japan | Italy | United States | China |
| 2012 | Ningbo | United States | Brazil | Turkey | Great Britain | Brazil | United States | Japan |
| 2013 | Sapporo | Brazil | China | Serbia | Japan | Brazil | United States | Japan |
| 2014 | Tokyo | Brazil | Japan | Russia | Italy | United States | China | Brazil |
| 2015 | Omaha | United States | Russia | Brazil | Japan | China | Serbia | United States |
| 2016 | Bangkok | Brazil | United States | Netherlands | Brazil | China | Serbia | United States |
| 2017 | Nanjing | Brazil | Italy | Serbia | Japan | China | Brazil | United States |

==== Volleyball Nations League (2018–present) ====
| Year | VNL Host | Gold | Silver | Bronze | Host | Gold | Silver | Bronze |
|---|---|---|---|---|---|---|---|---|
| 2018 | Nanjing | United States | Turkey | China | Japan | Serbia | Italy | China |
| 2019 | Nanjing | United States | Brazil | China | Japan | China | United States | Russia |
| 2021 | Rimini | United States | Brazil | Turkey | Japan | United States | Brazil | Serbia |
| 2022 | Ankara | Italy | Brazil | Serbia | Netherlands–Poland | Serbia | Brazil | Italy |
| 2023 | Arlington | Turkey | China | Poland | Japan (Note: The 2023 World Cup is only a part of 2023 FIVB Volleyball Women's Olympic Qualification Tournaments.) | | | |
| 2024 | Bangkok | Italy | Japan | Poland | France | Italy | United States | Brazil |
| 2025 | Łódź | Italy | Brazil | Poland | Thailand | Italy | Turkey | Brazil |
| 2026 | Macau | Turkey | Brazil | Italy | | | | |

== Women's Medals Summary ==
=== Medals Summary Excluding World Grand Prix and Volleyball Nations League ===
| Rank | Nation | Gold | Silver | Bronze | Total |
|---|---|---|---|---|---|
| 1 | Russia^{[a]} | 13 | 10 | 9 | 32 |
| 2 | China | 12 | 6 | 7 | 25 |
| 3 | Cuba | 11 | 4 | 1 | 16 |
| 4 | Japan | 6 | 7 | 5 | 18 |
| 5 | Italy | 6 | 1 | 1 | 8 |
| 6 | Brazil | 4 | 10 | 7 | 21 |
| 7 | United States | 2 | 10 | 8 | 20 |
| 8 | Serbia^{[d]} | 2 | 2 | 2 | 6 |
| 9 | Peru | 0 | 2 | 1 | 3 |
| 10 | Poland | 0 | 1 | 4 | 5 |
| 11 | Germany^{[c]} | 0 | 1 | 0 | 1 |
| 11 | Romania | 0 | 1 | 0 | 1 |
| 11 | Turkey | 0 | 1 | 0 | 1 |
| 14 | South Korea | 0 | 0 | 5 | 5 |
| 15 | Czech Republic^{[b]} | 0 | 0 | 2 | 2 |
| 15 | North Korea | 0 | 0 | 2 | 2 |
| 17 | Bulgaria | 0 | 0 | 1 | 1 |
| 17 | Dominican Republic | 0 | 0 | 1 | 1 |
| Totals (18 entries) | | 56 | 56 | 56 | 168 |

- ^[a] FIVB considers Russia (Since 1993) as the inheritor of the records of Soviet Union (1948–1991) and CIS (1992).
- ^[b] After German reunification, West Germany (1949–1990) was renamed Germany (Since 1991) and they absorbed East Germany (1949–1990) with the records.
- ^[c] FIVB considers Czech Republic (Since 1994) as the inheritor of the records of Czechoslovakia (1948–1993).
- ^[d] FIVB considers Serbia (Since 2007) as the inheritor of the records of SFR Yugoslavia (1948–1991), FR Yugoslavia (1992–2002) and Serbia and Montenegro (2003–2006).

=== World Grand Prix and Volleyball Nations League Medals Summary ===
| Rank | Nation | Gold | Silver | Bronze | Total |
|---|---|---|---|---|---|
| 1 | Brazil | 12 | 10 | 2 | 24 |
| 2 | United States | 9 | 1 | 2 | 12 |
| 3 | Russia | 3 | 6 | 4 | 13 |
| 4 | Italy | 3 | 3 | 5 | 11 |
| 5 | Cuba | 2 | 4 | 2 | 8 |
| 6 | Turkey | 2 | 1 | 2 | 5 |
| 7 | China | 1 | 6 | 5 | 12 |
| 8 | Netherlands | 1 | 0 | 1 | 2 |
| 9 | Japan | 0 | 2 | 0 | 2 |
| 10 | Serbia | 0 | 0 | 4 | 4 |
| 11 | Poland | 0 | 0 | 3 | 3 |
| 12 | Germany | 0 | 0 | 2 | 2 |
| 13 | South Korea | 0 | 0 | 1 | 1 |
| Totals (13 entries) | | 33 | 33 | 33 | 99 |

== See also ==
- Volleyball at the Summer Olympics
- FIVB Men's Volleyball World Cup - formerly known as the FIVB Men's Volleyball World Championship
- FIVB Women's Volleyball World Cup - formerly known as the FIVB Women's Volleyball World Championship
- FIVB Volleyball Men's World Cup - Folded 2019
- FIVB Volleyball Women's World Cup - Folded 2019
- FIVB Volleyball World Grand Champions Cup
- FIVB Volleyball World League
- FIVB Volleyball World Grand Prix
- FIVB Men's Volleyball Nations League
- FIVB Women's Volleyball Nations League
