= Josefina Capote =

Cuban volleyball player

Personal information
- Full name: Josefina Capote Travieso
- Born: 12 October 1961 (age 65); Havana, Cuba
- Height: 1.78 m (5 ft 10 in)

Volleyball information
- Position: Middle blocker
- Number: 9

National team
1979–1987	Cuba
Honours
Women's volleyball
Representing Cuba
World Championship
Silver medal – second place	1986 Czechoslovakia	Team
FIVB World Cup
Silver medal – second place	1985 Japan
Friendship Games
Gold medal – first place	1984 Varna
Pan American Games
Gold medal – first place	1979 Caguas	Team
Gold medal – first place	1983 Caracas	Team
Gold medal – first place	1987 Indianapolis	Team
Central American and Caribbean Games
Gold medal – first place	1982 Havana	Team

Josefina Capote (born 12 October 1961) is a Cuban former volleyball player. Capote competed in the women's tournament at the 1980 Summer Olympics in Moscow. She helped the Cuban team win gold medals at the 1979 Pan American Games in Caguas and the 1983 Pan American Games in Caracas, and the silver medal at the 1986 FIVB World Championship in Czechoslovakia. She was the captain of the Cuban team from 1980 until her retirement.
