= Inesma Molinet =

Cuban volleyball player

Inés Maria Molinet

Personal information
- Full name: Inés Maria Molinet León
- Born: 11 August 1965 (age 61); Camajuaní, Villa Clara Province, Cuba

Volleyball information
- Number: 4

National team
1981–1990	Cuba
Honours
Women's volleyball
Representing Cuba
World Championship
Silver medal – second place	1986 Czechoslovakia	Team
FIVB World Cup
Silver medal – second place	1985 Japan
Central American and Caribbean Games
Gold medal – first place	1986 Santiago de los Caballeros	Team
Gold medal – first place	1990 Mexico City	Team

Inés Maria Molinet León (born 11 August 1965), more commonly known as Inés Maria Molinet, is a Cuban former volleyball player who played with the Cuban women's national volleyball team. She helped Cuba win the silver medal at the 1986 FIVB World Championship in Czechoslovakia. She also won a silver medal with the Cuban team at the 1985 FIVB World Cup in Japan.

Molinet was born 11 August 1965, in Camajuaní, Villa Clara Province, Cuba. She has a degree in physical education.
