= Volleyball at the 2022 Mediterranean Games – Women's team rosters =

This article shows the rosters of all participating teams at the women's indoor volleyball tournament at the 2022 Mediterranean Games in Oran, Algeria.

== Group A ==
=== Croatia ===
The following is the Croatian roster in the 2022 Mediterranean Games.

- Head coach: Ferhat Akbaş

No.	Name	Date of birth	Height	Position	2021–22 club
2	Mika Grbavica	8 December 2001 (aged 20)	1.91 m (6 ft 3 in)	Opposite hitter	(Croatia) HAOK Mladost
4	Božana Butigan	19 August 2000 (aged 21)	1.92 m (6 ft 4 in)	Middle blocker	(Italy) Volley Bergamo
5	Nikolina Božičević	14 January 1995 (aged 27)	1.65 m (5 ft 5 in)	Libero	(Romania) CSM Târgoviște
6	Klara Perić	30 March 1998 (aged 24)	1.85 m (6 ft 1 in)	Setter	(Croatia) HAOK Mladost
7	Laura Miloš	20 October 1994 (aged 27)	1.78 m (5 ft 10 in)	Outside spiker	(France) Saint-Raphael Var Volley-Ball
8	Astrid Popić	24 July 1998 (aged 23)	1.90 m (6 ft 3 in)	Middle blocker	(Croatia) HAOK Mladost
11	Beta Dumančić	26 March 1991 (aged 31)	1.90 m (6 ft 3 in)	Middle blocker	(Germany) Rote Raben Vilsbiburg
12	Josipa Marković	25 January 2001 (aged 21)	1.85 m (6 ft 1 in)	Outside spiker	(Croatia) HAOK Mladost
14	Martina Šamadan	11 September 1993 (aged 28)	1.93 m (6 ft 4 in)	Middle blocker	(Croatia) HAOK Mladost
16	Lea Deak	27 April 2000 (aged 22)	1.77 m (5 ft 10 in)	Setter	(Switzerland) Volero Zürich
19	Izabela Štimac	12 November 2000 (aged 21)	1.71 m (5 ft 7 in)	Libero	(Croatia) HAOK Mladost
20	Natalia Tomić	4 January 2002 (aged 20)	1.88 m (6 ft 2 in)	Outside spiker	(Croatia) HAOK Mladost

=== France ===
The following is France's roster in the 2022 Mediterranean Games.

- Head coach: Émile Rousseaux

No.	Name	Date of birth	Height	Position	2021–22 club
8	Manon Bernard	23 January 1995 (aged 27)	1.75 m (5 ft 9 in)	Libero	(France) Volley-Ball Club Chamalières
13	Aurore Mobisa	3 December 2002 (aged 19)	1.83 m (6 ft 0 in)	Middle blocker	France Avenir 2024
21	Eva Elouga	14 October 2000 (aged 21)	1.92 m (6 ft 4 in)	Middle blocker	(France) Volley-Ball Club Chamalières
23	Léandra Olinga Andela	12 August 1997 (aged 24)	1.85 m (6 ft 1 in)	Middle blocker	(France) ASPTT Mulhouse
27	Mahé Mauriat	23 May 2000 (aged 22)	1.72 m (5 ft 8 in)	Setter	(France) Béziers Volley
34	Lisa Arbos	22 November 1996 (aged 25)	1.92 m (6 ft 4 in)	Outside spiker	(France) Saint-Raphael Var Volley-Ball
38	Leïa Ratahiry	27 September 2002 (aged 19)	1.92 m (6 ft 4 in)	Outside spiker	France Avenir 2024
63	Émilie Respaut	25 April 2003 (aged 19)	1.76 m (5 ft 9 in)	Setter	France Avenir 2024
75	Guewe Diouf	15 June 2002 (aged 20)	1.82 m (6 ft 0 in)	Outside spiker	(France) ASPTT Mulhouse
78	Aminata Dia	21 February 2002 (aged 20)	1.82 m (6 ft 0 in)	Middle blocker	France Avenir 2024
91	Halimatou Bah	21 December 2003 (aged 18)	1.87 m (6 ft 2 in)	Outside spiker	France Avenir 2024
98	Sabine Haewegene	9 May 1995 (aged 27)	1.76 m (5 ft 9 in)	Outside spiker	(France) Évreux Volley-ball

=== Serbia ===
The following is the Serbian roster in the 2022 Mediterranean Games.

- Head coach: Marijana Boričić

No.	Name	Date of birth	Height	Position	2021–22 club
1	Tara Taubner	11 January 2002 (aged 20)	1.86 m (6 ft 1 in)	Opposite hitter	(Serbia) OK Crvena Zvezda
2	Andrea Tišma	15 April 2003 (aged 19)	1.88 m (6 ft 2 in)	Setter	(Switzerland) Volero Zürich
3	Minja Osmajić	12 February 2003 (aged 19)	1.91 m (6 ft 3 in)	Middle blocker	(Serbia) OK Jedinstvo Stara Pazova
4	Bojana Gočanin	25 September 2002 (aged 19)	1.79 m (5 ft 10 in)	Libero	(Serbia) OK Tent
10	Jovana Cvetković	25 March 2002 (aged 20)	1.86 m (6 ft 1 in)	Outside spiker	(Serbia) OK Tent
11	Hena Kurtagić	27 August 2004 (aged 17)	1.95 m (6 ft 5 in)	Middle blocker	(Serbia) OK Tent
12	Ana Malešević	30 March 2002 (aged 20)	1.94 m (6 ft 4 in)	Middle blocker	(Serbia) OK Tent
14	Vanja Savić	13 May 2002 (aged 20)	1.93 m (6 ft 4 in)	Opposite hitter	(France) Volero Le Cannet
15	Isidora Kockarević	12 January 2002 (aged 20)	1.85 m (6 ft 1 in)	Outside spiker	(Serbia) OK Jedinstvo Stara Pazova
18	Branka Tica	23 August 2003 (aged 18)	1.80 m (5 ft 11 in)	Outside spiker	(Serbia) OK Jedinstvo Stara Pazova
21	Vanja Ivanović	22 October 2004 (aged 17)	1.83 m (6 ft 0 in)	Outside spiker	(Serbia) OK Železničar
30	Rada Perović	13 April 2001 (aged 21)	1.82 m (6 ft 0 in)	Setter	(Serbia) OK Železničar

== Group B ==
=== Egypt ===
The following is Egypt's roster in the 2022 Mediterranean Games.

No.	Name	Date of birth	Height	Position	2021–22 club
1	Aya El Shamy	27 November 1995 (aged 26)	1.83 m (6 ft 0 in)	Opposite hitter	(Egypt) Al Ahly
4	Nada Meawad	12 April 1998 (aged 24)	1.80 m (5 ft 11 in)	Outside spiker	(Switzerland) Volley Lugano
7	Mariam Ahmed	5 September 1995 (aged 26)	1.69 m (5 ft 7 in)	Libero	(Egypt) Al Ahly
8	Nahla Sameh	21 January 1990 (aged 32)	1.74 m (5 ft 9 in)	Outside spiker	(Egypt) Al Ahly
10	Maya Ahmed	8 March 1998 (aged 24)	1.80 m (5 ft 11 in)	Opposite hitter	
11	Sarah Hanafy	15 April 1997 (aged 25)	1.79 m (5 ft 10 in)	Opposite hitter	
12	Farida El Askalany	14 February 1995 (aged 27)	1.84 m (6 ft 0 in)	Middle blocker	(Egypt) Al Ahly
13	Laila Mahfouz	27 July 1994 (aged 27)	1.62 m (5 ft 4 in)	Setter	
15	Zeina Elalamy	1 January 2000 (aged 22)	1.81 m (5 ft 11 in)	Outside spiker	(Egypt) Al Ahly
19	Sohila Sayid	26 August 2000 (aged 21)	1.74 m (5 ft 9 in)	Setter	(Egypt) Al Ahly
20	Mariam Metwally	2 January 1999 (aged 23)	1.87 m (6 ft 2 in)	Middle blocker	(Egypt) Al Ahly
22	Dalia Morshedy	15 November 2001 (aged 20)	1.87 m (6 ft 2 in)	Middle blocker	(Egypt) Shooting Club

=== Greece ===
The following is Greece's roster in the 2022 Mediterranean Games.

No.	Name	Date of birth	Height	Position	2021–22 club
1	Eirini Chatziefstratiadou	2 September 1995 (aged 26)	1.86 m (6 ft 1 in)	Middle blocker	(Greece) Panathinaikos
4	Lamprini Konstantinidou	16 September 1996 (aged 25)	1.84 m (6 ft 0 in)	Setter	(Greece) AO Thiras Santorini
5	Asimina Nikologianni	4 June 1999 (aged 23)	1.85 m (6 ft 1 in)	Outside spiker	(Greece) Pannaxiakos V.C.
8	Elisavet Iliopoulou	25 January 2001 (aged 21)	1.76 m (5 ft 9 in)	Setter	(Greece) P.A.O.K.
9	Olga Strantzali	12 January 1996 (aged 26)	1.85 m (6 ft 1 in)	Outside spiker	(Romania) CSM Volei Alba Blaj
13	Maria-Aikaterini Xanthopoulou	24 October 1998 (aged 23)	1.63 m (5 ft 4 in)	Libero	(Greece) P.A.O.K.
16	Maria Genitsaridi	3 June 1994 (aged 28)	1.84 m (6 ft 0 in)	Outside spiker	(Greece) Olympiacos CFP
19	Anna Maria Spanou	18 November 1995 (aged 26)	1.86 m (6 ft 1 in)	Outside spiker	(France) Terville Florange Olympique Club
21	Stamatia Kyparissi	20 June 2002 (aged 20)	1.84 m (6 ft 0 in)	Outside spiker	(Greece) P.A.O.K.
22	Maria Klepkou	13 May 2000 (aged 22)	1.78 m (5 ft 10 in)	Outside spiker	(Greece) P.A.O.K.
23	Kyriaki Terzoglou	22 November 2003 (aged 18)	1.86 m (6 ft 1 in)	Middle blocker	(Greece) P.A.O.K.
24	Andromachi Tsiogka	3 November 2001 (aged 20)	1.90 m (6 ft 3 in)	Middle blocker	(Greece) P.A.O.K.

=== North Macedonia ===
The following is North Macedonia's roster in the 2022 Mediterranean Games.

No.	Name	Date of birth	Height	Position	2021–22 club
1	Emilija Popjordanovska	3 January 1993 (aged 29)	1.70 m (5 ft 7 in)	Libero	(North Macedonia) ŽOK Vardar Skopje
2	Meri Boshkovska	6 June 2005 (aged 17)	1.80 m (5 ft 11 in)	Opposite hitter	
3	Simona Stojanovska	17 May 2001 (aged 21)	1.77 m (5 ft 10 in)	Middle blocker	
4	Iva Stojkoska	25 April 2005 (aged 17)	1.82 m (6 ft 0 in)	Middle blocker	
7	Tamara Stojanova	9 June 1997 (aged 25)	1.78 m (5 ft 10 in)	Outside spiker	
10	Erjona Jonuzi	23 February 2001 (aged 21)	1.82 m (6 ft 0 in)	Setter	
12	Nadica Anteska	12 April 2004 (aged 18)	1.70 m (5 ft 7 in)	Libero	
13	Ana Pavloska	26 July 1996 (aged 25)	1.85 m (6 ft 1 in)	Middle blocker	(North Macedonia) ŽOK Vardar Skopje
14	Mila Dikova	9 December 2003 (aged 18)	1.82 m (6 ft 0 in)	Opposite hitter	
16	Mia Gjorgievska	8 June 2006 (aged 16)	1.76 m (5 ft 9 in)	Setter	
17	Tea Terzievska	31 December 1999 (aged 22)	1.80 m (5 ft 11 in)	Outside spiker	(Germany) TV Cloppenburg
18	Dobrina Hadji Toseva	18 March 2005 (aged 17)	1.81 m (5 ft 11 in)	Outside spiker	

=== Tunisia ===
The following is Tunisia's roster in the 2022 Mediterranean Games.

No.	Name	Date of birth	Height	Position	2021–22 club
2	Mouna Hamouda	10 June 1996 (aged 26)	1.75 m (5 ft 9 in)	Libero	(Tunisia) Club Féminine de Carthage
3	Dhouha Engazou	11 December 2003 (aged 18)	1.80 m (5 ft 11 in)	Outside spiker	
4	Chourouk Galai	26 September 1997 (aged 24)	1.85 m (6 ft 1 in)	Middle blocker	
7	Rahma Agrebi	2 November 1990 (aged 31)	1.85 m (6 ft 1 in)	Opposite hitter	(Tunisia) Club Féminine de Carthage
8	Abir Othmani	29 January 1991 (aged 31)	1.80 m (5 ft 11 in)	Middle blocker	(Tunisia) Club Féminine de Carthage
10	Eya Ismail	13 May 2001 (aged 21)	1.83 m (6 ft 0 in)	Opposite hitter	(Tunisia) CS Sfaxien
12	Ameni Ghizaoui	30 March 2002 (aged 20)	1.76 m (5 ft 9 in)	Outside spiker	
13	Sirine Bouraoui	12 October 1998 (aged 23)	1.81 m (5 ft 11 in)	Outside spiker	(Tunisia) Club Féminine de Carthage
14	Hiba Fatnassi	1 July 2003 (aged 18)	1.70 m (5 ft 7 in)	Setter	
15	Nihel Kebaier	8 August 1993 (aged 28)	1.73 m (5 ft 8 in)	Setter	(Tunisia) Club Féminine de Carthage
17	Sahar Jenhani	1 August 2005 (aged 16)	1.70 m (5 ft 7 in)	Middle blocker	
20	Nesrine Abda	20 July 2004 (aged 17)	1.90 m (6 ft 3 in)	Opposite hitter	

== Group C ==
=== Algeria ===
The following is Algeria's roster in the 2022 Mediterranean Games.

No.	Name	Date of birth	Height	Position	2021–22 club
1	Zina Mordjane Oudai	19 July 2000 (aged 21)	1.80 m (5 ft 11 in)	Setter	
3	Salima Hammouche	17 January 1984 (aged 38)	1.85 m (6 ft 1 in)	Libero	
5	Fahima Brahmi	2 March 1993 (aged 29)	1.85 m (6 ft 1 in)	Middle blocker	(Algeria) MC Alger
6	Wissem Djouhri	21 February 2002 (aged 20)	1.85 m (6 ft 1 in)	Opposite hitter	
7	Amira Bechar	11 February 2002 (aged 20)	1.80 m (5 ft 11 in)	Outside spiker	
8	Zohra Bensalem	5 April 1990 (aged 32)	1.80 m (5 ft 11 in)	Outside spiker	
10	Melissa Soualmi	15 October 2002 (aged 19)	1.85 m (6 ft 1 in)	Opposite hitter	
11	Yasmine Abderrahim	16 April 1999 (aged 23)	1.80 m (5 ft 11 in)	Outside spiker	(France) Pays d'Aix Venelles Volley-Ball
12	Kahina Djouhri	27 May 2000 (aged 22)	1.85 m (6 ft 1 in)	Middle blocker	
13	Radia Nadra Bellahsene	28 January 1994 (aged 28)	1.85 m (6 ft 1 in)	Setter	
14	Bekhta Rabah-Mazari	5 May 1998 (aged 24)	1.85 m (6 ft 1 in)	Outside spiker	
15	Aicha Mezemate	6 June 1991 (aged 31)	1.85 m (6 ft 1 in)	Middle blocker	

=== Spain ===
The following is Spain's roster in the 2022 Mediterranean Games.

No.	Name	Date of birth	Height	Position	2021–22 club
5	Laura Villasante	3 January 1992 (aged 30)	1.79 m (5 ft 10 in)	Opposite hitter	(Spain) Club Voleibol Leganés
6	Elia Rodríguez	19 May 2003 (aged 19)	1.74 m (5 ft 9 in)	Setter	(Spain) Club Voleibol Sant Cugat
7	Margalida Piza	27 May 2000 (aged 22)	1.64 m (5 ft 5 in)	Libero	(Spain) CV Alcobendas
8	Carlota García	21 February 1992 (aged 30)	1.89 m (6 ft 2 in)	Middle blocker	(Spain) CV Ciutadella
9	Raquel Lazaro	4 January 2000 (aged 22)	1.80 m (5 ft 11 in)	Setter	(United States) USC Trojans
10	Paula Carpintero	17 May 1999 (aged 23)	1.80 m (5 ft 11 in)	Opposite hitter	(Spain) CV Kiele Socuéllamos
12	Lucía Varela	10 August 2003 (aged 18)	1.97 m (6 ft 6 in)	Middle blocker	(Spain) CV Gran Canaria Urbaser
15	Lucía Prol	30 November 1999 (aged 22)	1.77 m (5 ft 10 in)	Outside spiker	(Spain) Sanaya Libby's La Laguna
18	Carla Jimenez Ruiz	16 June 2002 (aged 20)	1.86 m (6 ft 1 in)	Middle blocker	(Spain) Cajasol Juvasa
21	Inés Villa	14 February 1998 (aged 24)	1.77 m (5 ft 10 in)	Outside spiker	(Spain) Club Voleibol Leganés
22	Cristina Llorens	6 March 1995 (aged 27)	1.80 m (5 ft 11 in)	Outside spiker	(Spain) CV Ciutadella
24	Denia Bravo	14 April 1998 (aged 24)	1.79 m (5 ft 10 in)	Outside spiker	(Spain) CV Alcobendas

=== Italy ===
The following is Italy's roster in the 2022 Mediterranean Games.

No.	Name	Date of birth	Height	Position	2021–22 club
2	Francesca Bosio	8 July 1997 (aged 24)	1.79 m (5 ft 10 in)	Setter	(Italy) Chieri '76 Volleyball
13	Ilaria Battistoni	22 April 1996 (aged 26)	1.74 m (5 ft 9 in)	Setter	(Italy) AGIL Volley
16	Sofia D'Odorico	1 June 1997 (aged 25)	1.86 m (6 ft 1 in)	Outside spiker	(Italy) AGIL Volley
19	Federica Squarcini	24 September 2000 (aged 21)	1.83 m (6 ft 0 in)	Middle blocker	(Italy) Cuneo Granda Volley
20	Sara Panetoni	5 June 2000 (aged 22)	1.76 m (5 ft 9 in)	Libero	(Italy) Azzurra Volley San Casciano
22	Terry Enweonwu	5 December 2000 (aged 21)	1.87 m (6 ft 2 in)	Opposite hitter	(Italy) Azzurra Volley San Casciano
23	Elena Perinelli	27 June 1995 (aged 26)	1.82 m (6 ft 0 in)	Outside spiker	(Italy) Chieri '76 Volleyball
24	Alessia Mazzaro	19 September 1998 (aged 23)	1.84 m (6 ft 0 in)	Middle blocker	(Italy) Chieri '76 Volleyball
27	Emma Cagnin	26 June 2002 (aged 20)	1.83 m (6 ft 0 in)	Outside spiker	(Italy) Volley Bergamo
28	Bintu Diop	2 March 2002 (aged 20)	1.94 m (6 ft 4 in)	Opposite hitter	(Italy) Bartoccini Fortinfissi Perugia
29	Giorgia Frosini	29 November 2002 (aged 19)	1.91 m (6 ft 3 in)	Opposite hitter	(Italy) Imoco Volley
36	Linda Nwakalor	17 September 2002 (aged 19)	1.86 m (6 ft 1 in)	Middle blocker	(Italy) Bartoccini Fortinfissi Perugia

=== Turkey ===
The following is Turkey's roster in the 2022 Mediterranean Games.

No.	Name	Date of birth	Height	Position	2021–22 club
1	Melis Yılmaz	28 June 1997 (aged 24)	1.67 m (5 ft 6 in)	Libero	(Turkey) Aydın Büyükşehir Belediyespor
2	Ilkin Aydın	5 January 2000 (aged 22)	1.83 m (6 ft 0 in)	Outside spiker	(Turkey) Galatasaray S.K.
3	Emine Arıcı	17 January 1997 (aged 25)	1.92 m (6 ft 4 in)	Middle blocker	(Turkey) Aydın Büyükşehir Belediyespor
5	Ezgi Akyaldiz	25 May 1998 (aged 24)	1.82 m (6 ft 0 in)	Outside spiker	(Turkey) Kuzeyboru SK
8	Buse Ünal	29 July 1997 (aged 24)	1.88 m (6 ft 2 in)	Setter	(Turkey) Fenerbahçe S.K.
9	Aslıhan Kılıç	21 April 1998 (aged 24)	1.80 m (5 ft 11 in)	Setter	(Turkey) Aydın Büyükşehir Belediyespor
10	Ayçin Akyol	15 June 1999 (aged 23)	1.88 m (6 ft 2 in)	Middle blocker	(Turkey) Galatasaray S.K.
11	Buse Kayacan	15 July 1992 (aged 29)	1.76 m (5 ft 9 in)	Libero	(Turkey) Nilüfer Belediyespor
17	Tutku Burcu Yüzgenç	15 January 1999 (aged 23)	1.92 m (6 ft 4 in)	Opposite hitter	(Turkey) Fenerbahçe S.K.
18	Yasemin Şahin Yildirim	28 January 1995 (aged 27)	1.86 m (6 ft 1 in)	Middle blocker	(Turkey) Kuzeyboru SK
19	Derya Cebecioğlu	24 October 2000 (aged 21)	1.82 m (6 ft 0 in)	Outside spiker	(Turkey) VakıfBank S.K.
20	Yaprak Erkek	2 September 2001 (aged 20)	1.82 m (6 ft 0 in)	Outside spiker	(Poland) Legionovia Legionowo
