= Nancy González (volleyball) =

Cuban volleyball player

Personal information
- Full name: Nancy González Sánchez
- Born: 20 September 1963 (age 63); Ciego de Ávila, Cuba
- Height: 1.81 m (5 ft 11 in)

Volleyball information
- Position: Outside hitter
- Number: 5

National team
1983–1987	Cuba
Honours
Women's volleyball
Representing Cuba
World Championship
Silver medal – second place	1986 Czechoslovakia	Team
FIVB World Cup
Silver medal – second place	1985 Japan
Friendship Games
Gold medal – first place	1984 Varna
Pan American Games
Gold medal – first place	1983 Caracas	Team
Gold medal – first place	1987 Indianapolis	Team

Nancy González (born 20 September 1963) is a Cuban former volleyball player who played for the Cuban women's national volleyball team in the 1980s. González won a gold medal at the 1983 and 1987 Pan American Games, a silver medal at the 1985 FIVB World Cup, and a silver medal at the 1986 FIVB World Championship while playing with the Cuban team.
