= Wu Dan (volleyball) =

Chinese volleyball player

Personal information
- Born: 13 January 1968 (age 58) Neijiang, Sichuan, China
- Height: 177 cm (5 ft 10 in)

Volleyball information
- Position: Opposite / Libero
- Number: 12

National team
- Years: Team
- 1985–2000: China
Honours
Women's volleyball
Representing China
Olympic Games
Bronze medal – third place	1988 Seoul	Team
World Championship
Gold medal – first place	1986 Czechoslovakia	Team
Silver medal – second place	1990 China	Team
FIVB World Cup
Gold medal – first place	1985 Japan
Bronze medal – third place	1989 Japan
Silver medal – second place	1991 Japan
FIVB World Grand Prix
Silver medal – second place	1993 Hong Kong
Asian Games
Gold medal – first place	1986 Seoul	Team
Gold medal – first place	1990 Beijing	Team

Wu Dan (Chinese: 巫丹; pinyin: Wū Dān, born 13 January 1968) is a Chinese former volleyball player who competed in the 1988 Summer Olympics, the 1992 Summer Olympics, and the 2000 Summer Olympics. She tested positive for the banned substance strychnine at the 1992 Olympics; she had taken traditional Chinese medicine containing the substance.
