= Volleyball at the 2001 Mediterranean Games =

== Medal summary ==
=== Events ===
Event	Gold	Silver	Bronze
Men	Italy	Tunisia	Turkey
Women	Italy	Turkey	France

== Standings ==
=== Men's Competition ===
Rank	Team
1st place, gold medalist(s)	Italy
2nd place, silver medalist(s)	Tunisia
3rd place, bronze medalist(s)	Turkey
4	France
5	Spain
6	Yugoslavia
7	Greece
8	Cyprus
9	San Marino
10	Albania

=== Women's Competition ===
Rank	Team
1st place, gold medalist(s)	Italy
2nd place, silver medalist(s)	Turkey
3rd place, bronze medalist(s)	France
4	Greece
5	Spain
6	Yugoslavia
7	Croatia
8	Tunisia
9	Albania
10	San Marino
