= Yang Xilan =

Chinese volleyball player

Personal information
- Born: 16 March 1961 (age 65) Tianjin, China
- Height: 179 cm (5 ft 10 in)

Volleyball information
- Position: Setter
- Number: 6

National team
- Years: Team
- 1981–1989: China
Honours
Women's volleyball
Representing China
Olympic Games
| Gold medal – first place | 1984 Los Angeles | Team |
| Bronze medal – third place | 1988 Seoul | Team |
World Championship
| Gold medal – first place | 1982 Peru |
| Gold medal – first place | 1986 Czechoslovakia | Team |
FIVB World Cup
| Gold medal – first place | 1985 Japan |
Asian Games
| Gold medal – first place | 1982 New Delhi | Team |
| Gold medal – first place | 1986 Seoul | Team |

Yang Xilan (simplified Chinese: 杨锡兰; traditional Chinese: 楊錫蘭; pinyin: Yáng Xílán; born 16 March 1961) is a Chinese former volleyball player. She competed at the 1984 Summer Olympics in Los Angeles and the 1988 Summer Olympics in Seoul. She was a setter.

In 1984, Yang was a member of the Chinese volleyball team that won the gold medal. Four years later, Yang was part of the Chinese team that won the bronze medal.

== Awards ==
=== Individuals ===
- 1985 FIVB World Cup "Best setter"
- 1986 FIVB Women's Volleyball World Championship "Most valuable player"
- 1986 FIVB Women's Volleyball World Championship "Top scorer"

=== National team ===
- 1982 World Championship – Gold Medal
- 1984 Los Angeles Olympic Games – Gold Medal
- 1985 World Cup – Gold Medal
- 1986 World Championship – Gold Medal
