= Isel Saavedra =

Cuban volleyball player (born 1971)

Personal information
- Full name: Isel Saavedra León
- Born: 7 July 1971 (age 55); San Luis, Pinar del Río, Cuba
- Height: 1.78 m (5 ft 10 in)

Volleyball information
- Position: Opposite
- Number: 9

Career
| Years | Teams |
|---|---|
| 1994 | Pinar Del Rio |

National team
| 1991–1994 | Cuba |
Honours
Women's volleyball
Representing Cuba
World Championship
| Gold medal – first place | 1994 Brazil | Team |
FIVB World Cup
| Gold medal – first place | 1991 Japan |
Central American and Caribbean Games
| Gold medal – first place | 1993 Ponce | Team |

Isel Saavedra (born 7 July 1971) is a Cuban former volleyball player. She was part of the Cuban women's national volleyball team. She won gold medals at the 1991 FIVB World Cup in Japan and the 1994 FIVB World Championship in Brazil. On club level she played with Pinar Del Rio.

== Clubs ==
- Pinar Del Rio (1994)
