= Volleyball at the 1993 Central American and Caribbean Games =

Volleyball events were contested at the 1993 Central American and Caribbean Games in Ponce, Puerto Rico, Puerto Rico.

== Medal summary ==
Event	Gold	Silver	Bronze
Men's volleyball	Cuba (CUB)	Puerto Rico (PUR)	Venezuela (VEN)
Women's tournament	Cuba; Yumilka Ruiz; Zoila Barros; Yoselín Roque; Nancy González; Raisa O'Farrill; Enia Martínez; Maybelis Martínez; Isel Saavedra; Taimaris Agüero; Mabel Campos; Norka Latamblet; Mercedes Calderon	Mexico; Paula Eguiluz; Hilda Gaxiola; Landilina Arce; Kenia Olvera; María González; Laura Salinas; María Montes; Heden Martínez; Olga Orozco; Mirna Ramírez; Johana Gudino; Ruth Huipe	Venezuela; Milagros Cova; Yadeizi Abreu; Marilyn Belisario; Ninoska Closier; Graciela Márquez; Francis Bastidas; Ligcelia Salcedo; Elena Jinete; Endrinha Sosa; Nelitza Zambrano; Corina Lozada; Rosa Torres
