= Joël Despaigne =

Cuban volleyball player (born 1966)

Personal information
- Full name: Joël Despaigne Charles
- Nickname: El Diablo
- Born: 2 July 1966 (age 60); Santiago de Cuba, Cuba
- Height: 1.91 m (6 ft 3 in)

Volleyball information
- Position: Outside hitter
- Number: 4

National team
1986–1996	Cuba
Honours
Men's volleyball
Representing Cuba
World Championship
Silver medal – second place	1990 Brazil	Team
FIVB World Cup
Gold medal – first place	1989 Japan
Silver medal – second place	1991 Japan
FIVB World League
Silver medal – second place	1991 Italy
Silver medal – second place	1992 Italy
Silver medal – second place	1994 Italy
Goodwill Games
Bronze medal – third place	1990 Seattle
Pan American Games
Gold medal – first place	1991 Havana	Team
Silver medal – second place	1987 Indianapolis	Team
Bronze medal – third place	1995 Mar del Plata	Team
Central American and Caribbean Games
Gold medal – first place	1986 Santiago de los Caballeros	Team

Joël Despaigne Charles (born 2 July 1966), more commonly known as Joël Despaigne, is a retired volleyball player from Cuba who represented his native country in two consecutive Summer Olympics: the 1992 Summer Olympics in Barcelona (fourth place) and the 1996 Summer Olympics in Atlanta (sixth place). He was the captain of the Cuban national volleyball team in the early 1990s.

In the late 1980s and early 1990s, Despaigne, known by his nickname "El Diablo" ("The Devil"), was considered among the best volleyball players in the world. He was known for his jumping ability, with a vertical jump estimated to be around 40 inches (1.02 m). He was a powerful spiker, with a spike speed of about 75 miles per hour (121 kph). He had about 350 appearances with the Cuban national team.

Despaigne led the Cuban team to the gold medal at the 1989 FIVB World Cup in Japan. He also helped the Cuban team win the silver medal at the 1990 FIVB World Championship in Brazil, and was named the best player in the world in 1990 by the International Volleyball Federation (FIVB). He then helped the Cuban team win the gold medal at the 1991 Pan American Games in Havana, followed by the silver medal at the 1991 FIVB World Cup in Japan.

== Coaching ==
Despaigne lives in Italy and works as a volleyball coach.

== Awards and accolades ==
Despaigne was a torchbearer at the opening ceremony of the 1991 Pan American Games.

In 2020, Despaigne won a Fair Play Menarini International Award in the category of "Fair Play" for his sportsmanship.

== Personal life ==
Despaigne married María Teresa Santamaría, who was a member of the Cuban women's national volleyball team in the 1980s.
