= Vanja Ivanović =

Serbian volleyball player

- Ivanović with VakıfBank in 2026

Personal information
- Born: 22 October 2004 (age 22) Leskovac, Serbia and Montenegro
- Height: 1.85 m (6 ft 1 in)
- Weight: 73 kg (161 lb)
- Spike: 305 cm (120 in)
- Block: 305 cm (120 in)

Volleyball information
- Position: Outside hitter
- Current club: VakıfBank
- Number: 1 (national team), 22 (club)

Career
- Years: Team
- 2019–2020: (Serbia) ŽOK Leskovac
- 2020–2025: (Serbia) OK Železničar
- 2025–2026: (Russia) Korabelka
- 2026–: (Turkey) VakıfBank

National team
- Years: Team
- 2024–: Serbia
Honours
Women's volleyball
Representing Serbia
Mediterranean Games
Bronze medal – third place	2022 Oran	Team
Youth European Championship
Bronze medal – third place	2020 Podgorica

Vanja Ivanović (Serbian Cyrillic: Вања Ивановић; born 22 October 2004) is a Serbian volleyball player who plays as outside hitter for Turkish League side VakıfBank.

== International career ==
Ivanović is a member of the Serbia women's national volleyball team. In 2024 she participated at the 2024 Nations League.

== Awards ==
=== Club ===
OK Železničar

- Serbian League: 2025
- Serbian SuperCup: 2022

=== Individual ===
Club

- 2025 Serbian League – MVP
- 2025 Serbian League – Best server
- 2025 Serbian League – Best outside hitter
- 2025 Serbian Cup – Best outside hitter
