= Volleyball at the 2022 Mediterranean Games =

Volleyball competition

- Venue: Hamou Boutlélis Sports Palace; Belgaïd Multipurpose Omnisport Hall
- Dates: 26 June – 4 July
- Nations: 11
- Teams: 11 (men); 11 (women)

The volleyball tournaments at the 2022 Mediterranean Games in Oran took place between 26 June and 4 July 2022.

== Medal summary ==
=== Events ===
Event	Gold	Silver	Bronze
Men	Croatia	Spain	Italy
Women	Italy	Turkey	Serbia

=== Medal table ===
Rank	Nation	Gold	Silver	Bronze	Total
1	Italy	1	0	1	2
2	Croatia	1	0	0	1
3	Spain	0	1	0	1
3	Turkey	0	1	0	1
5	Serbia	0	0	1	1
Totals (5 entries)		2	2	2	6

== Participating nations ==
Men

Federation	Nation
CAVB Africa	Algeria; Egypt; Tunisia
CEV Europe	Italy; North Macedonia; Greece; Turkey; France; Croatia; Serbia; Spain

Women

Federation	Nation
CAVB Africa	Algeria; Egypt; Tunisia
CEV Europe	Italy; North Macedonia; Greece; Turkey; France; Croatia; Serbia; Spain
