= Volleyball at the 2022 Mediterranean Games – Women's tournament =

Women's Volleyball at the 2022 Mediterranean Games
- Venue: Hamou Boutlélis Sports Palace; Belgaïd Multipurpose Omnisport Hall
- Location: (Algeria) Oran
- Dates: 26 June – 4 July
- Nations: 11

Medalists
gold medal	Italy
silver medal	Turkey
bronze medal	Serbia

The women's volleyball tournament at the 2022 Mediterranean Games started on 26 June and ended on 4 July at the Bir El Djir Sports Hall in Bir El Djir and the Hamou Boutlélis Sports Palace in Oran, Algeria.

== Participating teams ==
- Algeria (host)
- Croatia
- Egypt
- Greece
- France
- Italy
- North Macedonia
- Serbia
- Spain
- Tunisia
- Turkey

== Venues ==
Semifinals, Third place match, Final		Preliminary round, Quarterfinals, Classification matches	
Oran, Algeria	Oran is located in Algeria	Bir El Djir, Algeria	Bir El Djir is located in Algeria
Hamou Boutlélis Sports Palace	Oran is located in Algeria	Belgaïd Multipurpose Omnisport Hall	Bir El Djir is located in Algeria
Capacity: 5,000	Oran is located in Algeria	Capacity: 1,000	Bir El Djir is located in Algeria

== Preliminary round ==
All times are local (UTC+1).

=== Group A ===
Pos	Team	Pld	W	L	Pts	SW	SL	SR	SPW	SPL	SPR	Qualification
1	Serbia	2	2	0	5	6	3	2.000	192	187	1.027	Final round
2	Croatia	2	1	1	3	5	5	1.000	209	200	1.045	Final round
3	France	2	0	2	1	3	6	0.500	186	200	0.930	

Date	Time		Score		Set 1	Set 2	Set 3	Set 4	Set 5	Total	Report
26 Jun	09:00	France	2–3	Croatia	23–25	25–20	19–25	25–21	10–15	102–106	P2 P3
27 Jun	09:00	Serbia	3–1	France	19–25	25–17	25–20	25–22		94–84	P2 P3
28 Jun	09:00	Croatia	2–3	Serbia	25–21	20–25	25–12	22–25	11–15	103–98	P2 P3

=== Group B ===
Pos	Team	Pld	W	L	Pts	SW	SL	SR	SPW	SPL	SPR	Qualification
1	Greece	3	3	0	9	9	0	MAX	225	148	1.520	Final round
2	Egypt	3	2	1	6	6	5	1.200	237	229	1.035	Final round
3	Tunisia	3	1	2	3	4	6	0.667	196	223	0.879	Final round
4	North Macedonia	3	0	3	0	1	9	0.111	192	236	0.814	

Date	Time		Score		Set 1	Set 2	Set 3	Set 4	Set 5	Total	Report
26 Jun	12:00	Egypt	3–1	North Macedonia	25–20	11–25	25–19	25–23		86–87	P2 P3
26 Jun	15:00	Tunisia	0–3	Greece	17–25	10–25	13–25			40–75	P2 P3
27 Jun	12:00	North Macedonia	0–3	Tunisia	20–25	11–25	21–25			52–75	P2 P3
27 Jun	15:00	Greece	3–0	Egypt	25–19	25–14	25–22			75–55	P2 P3
28 Jun	12:00	Greece	3–0	North Macedonia	25–18	25–16	25–19			75–53	P2 P3
28 Jun	15:00	Egypt	3–1	Tunisia	25–21	25–21	21–25	25–14		96–81	P2 P3

=== Group C ===
Pos	Team	Pld	W	L	Pts	SW	SL	SR	SPW	SPL	SPR	Qualification
1	Turkey	3	3	0	9	9	2	4.500	267	199	1.342	Final round
2	Italy	3	2	1	6	7	3	2.333	239	189	1.265	Final round
3	Spain	3	1	2	3	4	6	0.667	207	240	0.863	Final round
4	Algeria	3	0	3	0	0	9	0.000	144	229	0.629	

Date	Time		Score		Set 1	Set 2	Set 3	Set 4	Set 5	Total	Report
26 Jun	18:00	Italy	3–0	Spain	25–15	25–17	25–19			75–51	P1 P2
26 Jun	21:00	Algeria	0–3	Turkey	16–25	4–25	13–25			33–75	P2 P3
27 Jun	18:00	Turkey	3–1	Italy	26–24	25–19	19–25	25–21		95–89	P2 P3
27 Jun	21:00	Spain	3–0	Algeria	25–23	29–27	25–18			79–68	P2 P3
28 Jun	18:00	Turkey	3–1	Spain	22–25	25–16	25–18	25–18		97–77	P1 P2
28 Jun	21:00	Italy	3–0	Algeria	25–11	25–14	25–18			75–43	P2 P3

== Final round ==
=== Classification bracket ===
Classification 5th–8th
1 July
Egypt	3
Tunisia	1
1 July
Croatia	1
Greece	3

Fifth place
2 July
Egypt	1
Greece	3
Seventh place
2 July
Tunisia	0
Croatia	3

==== Classification 5th–8th ====
Date	Time		Score		Set 1	Set 2	Set 3	Set 4	Set 5	Total	Report
1 Jul	09:30	Egypt	3–1	Tunisia	25–12	21–25	25–18	25–21		96–76	P2 P3
1 Jul	12:30	Croatia	1–3	Greece	25–20	22–25	23–25	19–25		89–95	P2 P3

==== Seventh place game ====
Date	Time		Score		Set 1	Set 2	Set 3	Set 4	Set 5	Total	Report
2 Jul	09:30	Tunisia	0–3	Croatia	19–25	12–25	20–25			51–75	P2 P3

==== Fifth place game ====
Date	Time		Score		Set 1	Set 2	Set 3	Set 4	Set 5	Total	Report
2 Jul	12:30	Egypt	1–3	Greece	25–17	16–25	17–25	21–25		79–92	P2 P3

=== Championship bracket ===
Quarter-finals
30 June
Serbia	3
Egypt	1
30 June
Turkey	3
Tunisia	0
30 June
Croatia	0
Italy	3
30 June
Greece	0
Spain	3

Semi-finals
2 July
Serbia	0
Turkey	3
2 July
Italy	3
Spain	0

Final
4 July
Turkey	1
Italy	3
Third place
4 July
Serbia	3
Spain	2

==== Quarterfinals ====
Date	Time		Score		Set 1	Set 2	Set 3	Set 4	Set 5	Total	Report
30 Jun	10:00	Serbia	3–1	Egypt	25–11	25–20	25–27	25–21		100–79	P2 P3
30 Jun	13:00	Croatia	0–3	Italy	18–25	16–25	19–25			53–75	P2 P3
30 Jun	16:00	Greece	0–3	Spain	22–25	22–25	22–25			66–75	P2 P3
30 Jun	19:00	Turkey	3–0	Tunisia	25–14	25–15	25–17			75–46	P2 P3

==== Semifinals ====
Date	Time		Score		Set 1	Set 2	Set 3	Set 4	Set 5	Total	Report
2 Jul	10:00	Serbia	0–3	Turkey	21–25	14–25	22–25			57–75	P2 P3
2 Jul	13:00	Italy	3–0	Spain	25–19	25–19	25–22			75–60	P2 P3

==== Third place game ====
Date	Time		Score		Set 1	Set 2	Set 3	Set 4	Set 5	Total	Report
4 Jul	09:30	Serbia	3–2	Spain	16–25	25–16	20–25	25–16	15–10	101–92	P2 P3

==== Final ====
Date	Time		Score		Set 1	Set 2	Set 3	Set 4	Set 5	Total	Report
4 Jul	16:30	Turkey	1–3	Italy	24–26	20–25	25–22	22–25		91–98	P2 P3

== Final standings ==
Rank	Team
1st place, gold medalist(s)	Italy
2nd place, silver medalist(s)	Turkey
3rd place, bronze medalist(s)	Serbia
4	Spain
5	Greece
6	Egypt
7	Croatia
8	Tunisia
9	France
10	North Macedonia
10	Algeria

== See also ==
- Volleyball at the Mediterranean Games
- Volleyball at the 2022 Mediterranean Games – Men's tournament
