= Volleyball at the 2001 Mediterranean Games – Women's tournament =

Women's Volleyball at the 2001 Mediterranean Games
- Dates: 5–11 September 2001

Medalists
| gold medal | Italy |
| silver medal | Turkey |
| bronze medal | France |

The Women's Volleyball tournament at the 2001 Mediterranean Games was held in Sidi Bou Said and Hammam-Lif.

== Teams ==
Group A

- Albania
- Greece
- Spain
- Tunisia
- Turkey

Group B

- Croatia
- France
- Italy
- San Marino
- FR Yugoslavia

== Preliminary round ==
=== Group A ===
| | Team | Points | G | W | L | PW | PL | Ratio | SW | SL | Ratio |
|---|---|---|---|---|---|---|---|---|---|---|---|
| 1. | Turkey | 8 | 4 | 4 | 0 | 327 | 226 | 1.447 | 12 | 1 | 12.00 |
| 2. | Greece | 7 | 4 | 3 | 1 | 338 | 279 | 1.211 | 10 | 5 | 2.000 |
| 3. | Spain | 6 | 4 | 2 | 2 | 301 | 274 | 1.099 | 8 | 6 | 1.333 |
| 4. | Tunisia | 5 | 4 | 1 | 3 | 221 | 314 | 0.704 | 3 | 10 | 0.300 |
| 5. | Albania | 4 | 4 | 0 | 4 | 230 | 324 | 0.710 | 1 | 12 | 0.083 |

- September 5, 2001

| Greece | 3 – 2 | Spain | 25–20, 21–25, 25–13, 16–25, 15–7 |

| Tunisia | 3 – 1 | Albania | 25–21, 28–26, 21–25, 25–17 |

- September 6, 2001

| Turkey | 3 – 0 | Albania | 25–14, 25–13, 25–10 |

| Spain | 3 – 0 | Tunisia | 25–9, 25–20, 25–10 |

- September 7, 2001

| Greece | 3 – 0 | Albania | 25–19, 25–14, 25–13 |

| Turkey | 3 – 0 | Tunisia | 25–8, 25–17, 25–17 |

- September 8, 2001

| Greece | 3 – 0 | Tunisia | 25–17, 25–12, 25–12 |

| Turkey | 3 – 0 | Spain | 25–20, 25–22, 25–19 |

- September 9, 2001

| Spain | 3 – 0 | Albania | 25–19, 25–16, 25–23 |

| Turkey | 3 – 1 | Greece | 25–21, 27–29, 25–21, 25–15 |

=== Group B ===
| | Team | Points | G | W | L | PW | PL | Ratio | SW | SL | Ratio |
|---|---|---|---|---|---|---|---|---|---|---|---|
| 1. | Italy | 8 | 4 | 4 | 0 | 304 | 177 | 1.718 | 12 | 0 | MAX |
| 2. | France | 7 | 4 | 3 | 1 | 343 | 293 | 1.171 | 9 | 6 | 1.500 |
| 3. | FR Yugoslavia | 6 | 4 | 2 | 2 | 304 | 284 | 1.070 | 8 | 6 | 1.333 |
| 4. | Croatia | 5 | 4 | 1 | 3 | 264 | 273 | 0.967 | 4 | 9 | 0.444 |
| 5. | San Marino | 4 | 4 | 0 | 4 | 112 | 300 | 0.373 | 0 | 12 | 0.000 |

- September 5, 2001

| France | 3 – 2 | FR Yugoslavia | 22–25, 23–25, 25–11, 27–25, 15–13 |

| Italy | 3 – 0 | San Marino | 25–5, 21–5, 25–6 |

- September 6, 2001

| Italy | 3 – 0 | FR Yugoslavia | 25–11, 25–17, 29–27 |

| Croatia | 3 – 0 | San Marino | 25–8, 25–9, 25–8 |

- September 7, 2001

| Italy | 3 – 0 | Croatia | 25–13, 25–14, 25–21 |

| France | 3 – 0 | San Marino | 25–12, 25–12, 25–8 |

- September 8, 2001

| FR Yugoslavia | 3 – 0 | Croatia | 25–20, 25–18, 25–17 |

| Italy | 3 – 0 | France | 25–21, 25–19, 25–18 |

- September 9, 2001

| France | 3 – 1 | Croatia | 25–23, 25–22, 23–25, 25–16 |

| FR Yugoslavia | 3 – 0 | San Marino | 25–12, 25–11, 25–5 |

=== Final round ===
Semi-finals
France | 0
Turkey | 3
Greece | 0
Italy | 3

Final
Italy | 3
Turkey | 0
Third place
France | 3
Greece | 1

==== Semi finals ====
- September 10, 2001

| Turkey | 3 – 0 | France | 25–23, 25–23, 25–20 |
| Italy | 3 – 0 | Greece | 25–17, 25–20, 25–16 |

==== Finals ====
- September 10, 2001 — Classification Match (9th/10th place)

| Albania | 3 – 0 | San Marino | 25–17, 25–19, 25–19 |

- September 10, 2001 — Classification Match (7th/8th place)

| Croatia | 3 – 0 | Tunisia | 25–21, 25–21, 25–15 |

- September 10, 2001 — Classification Match (5th/6th place)

| Spain | 3 – 0 | FR Yugoslavia | 25–20, 26–24, 25–23 |

- September 11, 2001 — Classification Match (Bronze-medal match)

| France | 3 – 1 | Greece | 25–14, 22–25, 25–16, 27–25 |

- September 11, 2001 — Classification Match (Gold-medal match)

| Italy | 3 – 0 | Turkey | 25–9, 20–23, 25–18 |

=== Final ranking ===
| RANK | TEAM |
|---|---|
| | Italy |
| | Turkey |
| | France |
| 4. | Greece |
| 5. | Spain |
| 6. | FR Yugoslavia |
| 7. | Croatia |
| 8. | Tunisia |
| 9. | Albania |
| 10. | San Marino |

=== Awards ===
2001 Women's Mediterranean Games champions

Italy
