= 1999 Women's African Volleyball Championship =

The 1999 Women's African Volleyball Championship was held in Lagos, Nigeria, in 1999.

== Group stage ==
=== Group A ===
| Pos | Team | Pld | W | L | Pts | SW | SL | SR | SPW | SPL | SPR |
|---|---|---|---|---|---|---|---|---|---|---|---|
| 1 | Tunisia | 3 | 3 | 0 | 6 | 9 | 2 | 4.500 | 0 | 0 | — |
| 2 | Cameroon | 3 | 2 | 1 | 5 | 7 | 3 | 2.333 | 0 | 0 | — |
| 3 | Nigeria | 3 | 1 | 2 | 4 | 4 | 6 | 0.667 | 0 | 0 | — |
| 4 | Guinea | 3 | 0 | 3 | 3 | 0 | 9 | 0.000 | 0 | 0 | — |

| {{{date}}} | Nigeria | 3–0 | Guinea |

| {{{date}}} | Tunisia | 3–1 | Cameroon |

| {{{date}}} | Tunisia | 3–1 | Nigeria |

| {{{date}}} | Cameroon | 3–0 | Guinea |

| {{{date}}} | Cameroon | 3–0 | Nigeria |

| {{{date}}} | Tunisia | 3–0 | Guinea |

1999 Women's African champions

Tunisia
3rd title

== Standing ==
| Rank | Team |
|---|---|
| 1st place, gold medalist(s) | Tunisia |
| 2nd place, silver medalist(s) | Cameroon |
| 3rd place, bronze medalist(s) | Nigeria |
| 4 | Guinea |
