= Regina Uchoa =

Brazilian volleyball player (born 1959)

Personal information
- Full name: Regina Pereira de Mendonca Uchoa
- Nationality: Brazilian
- Born: 20 September 1959 (age 67)
- Height: 1.79 m (5 ft 10 in)
- Weight: 67 kg (148 lb)

Volleyball information
- Number: 9 (national team)

National team
1986	Brazil

Regina Pereira de Mendonca Uchoa (born 20 September 1959) is a Brazilian female volleyball player. She was part of the Brazil women's national volleyball team.

She competed at the 1984 Summer Olympic Games, and at the 1986 FIVB Volleyball Women's World Championship.
