= Eliani da Costa =

Brazilian volleyball player (born 1969)

Personal information
- Full name: Eliani Miranda da Costa
- Nickname: Lica
- Nationality: Brazilian
- Born: 5 August 1969 (age 57)
- Height: 1.77 m (5 ft 10 in)

National team
1984-1988	Brazil

Eliani "Lica" Miranda da Costa (born 5 August 1969) was a Brazilian female volleyball player.

She was part of the Brazil women's national volleyball team at the 1984 Summer Olympics and the 1988 Summer Olympics. She also competed at the 1986 FIVB Volleyball Women's World Championship.
