= Volleyball at the 2001 Mediterranean Games – Men's tournament =

Men's Volleyball at the 2001 Mediterranean Games
- Dates: 6–13 September 2001

The Men's Volleyball tournament at the 2001 Mediterranean Games was held in La Goulette and Sidi Bou Said.

== Teams ==
Group A

- Algeria
- Lebanon
- Tunisia

Group B

- Cyprus
- France
- Spain

Group C

- Greece
- San Marino
- Turkey

Group D

- Albania
- Italy
- FR Yugoslavia

== Preliminary round ==
=== Group A ===
	Team	Points	G	W	L	PW	PL	Ratio	SW	SL	Ratio
1.	Tunisia	–	–	–	–	–	–	–	–	–	–
2.	Algeria	–	–	–	–	–	–	–	–	–	–
3.	Lebanon	–	–	–	–	–	–	–	–	–	–

Algeria and Lebanon withdrew from the competition. Therefore, as the sole representative of Group A, Tunisia has automatically qualified for the quarter finals.

=== Group B ===
	Team	Points	G	W	L	PW	PL	Ratio	SW	SL	Ratio
1.	France	4	2	2	0	195	168	1.161	6	2	3.000
2.	Spain	3	2	1	1	172	154	1.117	4	3	1.333
3.	Cyprus	2	2	0	2	125	170	0.735	1	6	0.167

Due to the withdrawals in Group A, Cyprus has qualified for the quarter finals with the best set average.

- September 6, 2001

France	3 – 1	Cyprus	25–11, 20–25, 25–19, 25–16

- September 7, 2001

Spain	3 – 0	Cyprus	25–17, 25–17, 25–20

- September 8, 2001

France	3 – 1	Spain	25–22, 19–25, 25–21, 31–29

=== Group C ===
	Team	Points	G	W	L	PW	PL	Ratio	SW	SL	Ratio
1.	Turkey	4	2	2	0	186	164	1.134	6	2	3.000
2.	Greece	3	2	1	1	186	175	1.063	5	3	1.667
3.	San Marino	2	2	0	2	117	150	0.780	0	6	0.000

- September 6, 2001

Turkey	3 – 0	San Marino	25–19, 25–17, 25–17

- September 7, 2001

Greece	3 – 0	San Marino	25–20, 25–22, 25–22

- September 8, 2001

Turkey	3 – 2	Greece	20–25, 25–23, 24–26, 27–25, 15–12

=== Group D ===
	Team	Points	G	W	L	PW	PL	Ratio	SW	SL	Ratio
1.	Italy	4	2	2	0	150	97	1.546	6	0	6.000
2.	FR Yugoslavia	3	2	1	1	123	123	1.000	3	3	1.000
3.	Albania	2	2	0	2	97	150	0.647	0	6	0.000

- September 6, 2001

Italy	3 – 0	Albania	25–14, 25–17, 25–18

- September 7, 2001

FR Yugoslavia	3 – 0	Albania	25–23, 25–14, 25–11

- September 8, 2001

Italy	3 – 0	FR Yugoslavia	25–19, 25–14, 25–15

=== Final round ===
Quarter-finals
FR Yugoslavia	2
France	3
Greece	1
Tunisia	3
Turkey	3
Cyprus	0
Italy	3
Spain	0

Semi-finals
France	0
Tunisia	3
Turkey	1
Italy	3

Final
Italy	3
Tunisia	1
Third place
Turkey	3
France	0

==== Quarter finals ====
- September 10, 2001

FR Yugoslavia	2 – 3	France	25–19, 25–21, 21–25, 24–26, 11–15
Greece	1 – 3	Tunisia	25–23, 19–25, 13–25, 18–25
Turkey	3 – 0	Cyprus	25–18, 25–11, 25–14
Italy	3 – 0	Spain	27–25, 25–18, 27–25

==== Classification matches ====
- September 11, 2001

FR Yugoslavia	3 – 1	Greece	17–25, 25–14, 25–21, 25–22
Spain	3 – 0	Cyprus	25–19, 25–16, 26–24

==== Semi finals ====
- September 12, 2001

France	0 – 3	Tunisia	19–25, 19–25, 18–25
Turkey	1 – 3	Italy	17–25, 25–20, 15–25, 16–25

==== Finals ====
- September 9, 2001 — Classification Match (9th/10th place)

San Marino	3 – 1	Albania	25–27, 25–18, 25–21, 25–19

- September 12, 2001 — Classification Match (7th/8th place)

Greece	3 – 1	Cyprus	24–26, 25–19, 25–19, 25–15

- September 12, 2001 — Classification Match (5th/6th place)

Spain	3 – 0	FR Yugoslavia	25–17, 25–22, 25–20

- September 13, 2001 — Classification Match (Bronze-medal match)

Turkey	3 – 0	France	25–23, 25–20, 25–21

- September 13, 2001 — Classification Match (Gold-medal match)

Tunisia	1 – 3	Italy	25–21, 20–25, 15–25, 24–26

=== Final ranking ===
RANK	TEAM
	Italy
	Tunisia
	Turkey
4.	France
5.	Spain
6.	FR Yugoslavia
7.	Greece
8.	Cyprus
9.	San Marino
10.	Albania

=== Awards ===
2001 Men's Mediterranean Games champions

Italy
