= Rahma Agrebi =

Tunisian volleyball player

Personal information
- Nationality: Tunisia
- Born: 2 November 1990 (age 35)
- Height: 1.76 m (5 ft 9 in)
- Weight: 72 kg (159 lb)
- Spike: 275 cm (108 in)
- Block: 260 cm (100 in)

Volleyball information
- Number: 7

Career
Years	Teams
2014	(Tunisia) CF Carthage

Rahma Agrebi (born 2 November 1990) is a Tunisian female volleyball player. She is a member of the Tunisia women's national volleyball team and played for CF Carthage in 2014.

She was part of the Tunisian national team at the 2014 FIVB Volleyball Women's World Championship in Italy.

== Clubs ==
- (Tunisia) CF Carthage (2014)
