= 1985 Women's African Volleyball Championship =

The 1985 Women's African Volleyball Championship was the Second Edition African continental volleyball Championship for women in Africa and it was held in Tunis, Tunisia, with Four teams participated.

== Teams ==
- Algeria
- Cameroon
- Egypt
- Tunisia

== Final ranking ==
| Rank | Team |
|---|---|
| 1st place, gold medalist(s) | Tunisia |
| 2nd place, silver medalist(s) | Egypt |
| 3rd place, bronze medalist(s) | Cameroon |
| 4 | Algeria |

1985 Women's African champions

Tunisia
First title
