= North Macedonia women's national volleyball team =

Women's national volleyball team representing North Macedonia

North Macedonia
- Association: North Macedonia Volleyball Federation
- Confederation: CEV
- FIVB ranking: 109 ▼20 (2 October 2026)

Uniforms
Home	Away	Third

The North Macedonia women's national volleyball team ( Macedonian : Женскa одбојкарска репрезентација на Македонија ) represents North Macedonia in international women's volleyball competitions and friendly matches, The Team Ruled and managed by the Volleyball Federation of North Macedonia that is a part of the Federation of International Volleyball (FIVB) as well as the European Volleyball Confederation (CEV), The North Macedonia team also follow the Balkan Volleyball Association (BVA).

== History ==
After the collapse of Yugoslavia and the independence of the Republic of Macedonia in 1992, the Macedonian Volleyball Federation joined the FIVB and the CEV. The first appearance of the women's national team of the Republic of Macedonia in the official international competitions took place only 6 years later during the qualifying tournament of the European Championship 1999 (category "B"). In their debut match on May 31, 1998, they defeated Finland 3:1 on the road. The next three games in their group, was the defeating against Turkey twice and one from Greece, and then they withdrew from the competition. Later the Macedonian national team only occasionally participated in official international competitions under the auspices of FIVB and CEV. The team has twice participated in the European Championship qualifiers (2001 and 2009), as well as in the 2014 World Championship qualifiers. In the ranking of European national teams, North Macedonia is low ranked. The reason for this is that volleyball in this small European country lags behind the popularity of such game sports like football, handball and basketball.

== Mediterranean Games ==
Year	Position	Pld	W	L
(Algeria) 2022	9 th place			
(Italy) 2026	7th place			
