= Tunisia women's national volleyball team =

Women's national volleyball team representing Tunisia

Tunisia
- Nickname(s): نسور قرطاج (Eagles of Carthage)
- Association: Tunisian Volleyball Federation
- Confederation: CAVB
- Head coach: Alessandra Campedelli
- FIVB ranking: 79 (2 October 2026)

Uniforms
Home	Away	Third

Summer Olympics
- Appearances: None

World Championship
- Appearances: 3 (First in 1978)
- Best result: 16th place (1986)

World Cup
- Appearances: 2 (First in 1985)
- Best result: 8th place (1985)

African Championship
- Appearances: 16 (First in 1976)
- Best result: Champions (gold) (3) (1985, 1987, 1999)
- www.ftvb.org
Honours
Event	1st	2nd	3rd
African Championship	3	2	3
Arab Championship	2	0	0
Pan Arab Games	0	4	0
Total	5	6	3

Tunisia women's national volleyball team
Medal record

African Championship
Gold medal – first place	1985 Tunis	Team
Gold medal – first place	1987 Rabat	Team
Gold medal – first place	1999 Lagos	Team
Silver medal – second place	1976 Cairo	Team
Silver medal – second place	2009 Batna	Team
Bronze medal – third place	1995 Nairobi	Team
Bronze medal – third place	2007 Nairobi	Team
Bronze medal – third place	2013 Nairobi	Team

Arab Championship
Gold medal – first place	1980	Team
Gold medal – first place	1989	Team

Pan Arab Games
Silver medal – second place	1985 Rabat	Team
Silver medal – second place	1992 Damascus	Team
Silver medal – second place	1999 Amman	Team
Silver medal – second place	2023 Algiers	Team

The Tunisian women's national volleyball team (Arabic: منتخب تونس لكرة الطائرة للسيدات), nicknamed Les Aigles de Carthage (The Eagles of Carthage or The Carthage Eagles), represents Tunisia in international women's volleyball competitions and friendly matches.

The team lastly qualified for the 2021 Women's African Nations Volleyball Championship.

== Results ==
Champions Runners up Third place Fourth place

- Red border color indicates tournament was held on home soil.

=== Olympic Games ===
Tunisia in the Olympic Games record
Year	Rank	GP	W	L	SW	SL
(Japan) 1964	did not compete					
(Mexico) 1968	did not compete					
(West Germany) 1972	did not compete					
(Canada) 1976	did not compete					
(Soviet Union) 1980	did not compete					
(United States) 1984	did not compete					
(South Korea) 1988	did not compete					
(Spain) 1992	did not compete					
(United States) 1996	did not compete					
(Australia) 2000	did not compete					
(Greece) 2004	did not compete					
(China) 2008	did not compete					
(United Kingdom) 2012	did not compete					
(Brazil) 2016	did not compete					
(Japan) 2020	did not compete					
(France) 2024	did not compete					
(United States) 2028	to de determined					
(Australia) 2032	to de determined					
	Total	0	0	0	0	0

=== World Championship ===
Tunisia in the FIVB World Championships record
Year	Round	Position	GP	W	L	SW	SL
(Soviet Union) 1952	did not compete						
(France) 1956	did not compete						
(Brazil) 1960	did not compete						
(Soviet Union) 1962	did not compete						
(Japan) 1967	did not compete						
(Bulgaria) 1970	did not compete						
(Mexico) 1974	did not compete						
(Soviet Union) 1978	Group stages	23rd Place	8	0	8	0	24
(Peru) 1982	did not compete						
(Czechoslovakia) 1986	Group stages	16th Place	6	0	6	0	18
(China) 1990	did not compete						
(Brazil) 1994	did not compete						
(Japan) 1998	did not compete						
(Germany) 2002	did not compete						
(Japan) 2006	did not compete						
(Japan) 2010	did not compete						
(Italy) 2014	Group stages	21st Place	5	0	5	1	15
(Japan) 2018	did not compete						
(Netherlands) (Poland) 2022	did not compete						
(Thailand) 2025	did not compete						
(Canada) (United States) 2027	To be determined						
(Philippines) 2029	To be determined						
Total	0 Titles	3/22	11	0	19	1	57

=== World Cup ===
Tunisia in the FIVB World Cup record
Year	Round	Position	GP	W	L	SW	SL
(Uruguay) 1973	did not compete						
(Japan) 1977	did not compete						
(Japan) 1981	did not compete						
(Japan) 1985	Round Robin	8th Place	7	0	7	0	21
(Japan) 1989	did not compete						
(Japan) 1991	did not compete						
(Japan) 1995	did not compete						
(Japan) 1999	Round Robin	12th Place	11	0	11	0	33
(Japan) 2003	did not compete						
(Japan) 2007	did not compete						
(Japan) 2011	did not compete						
(Japan) 2015	did not compete						
(Japan) 2019	did not compete						
Total	0 Titles	2/13	18	0	18	0	54

=== African Volleyball Championship ===
Tunisia in the Women's African Volleyball Championship
Year	Round	Position	GP	W	L	SW	SL
(Egypt) 1976	2nd place	2nd place, silver medalist(s)	?	?	?	?	?
(Tunisia) 1985	Champions	1st place, gold medalist(s)	?	?	?	?	?
(Morocco) 1987	Champions	1st place, gold medalist(s)	?	?	?	?	?
(Mauritius) 1989	did not compete						
(Egypt) 1991	5th place		?	?	?	?	?
(Nigeria) 1993	6th place		?	?	?	?	?
(Kenya) 1995	3rd place	3rd place, bronze medalist(s)	?	?	?	?	?
(Kenya) 1997	did not compete						
(Nigeria) 1999	Champions	1st place, gold medalist(s)	3	3	0	9	2
(Nigeria) 2001	did not compete						
(Kenya) 2003	5th place		4	2	2	6	6
(Nigeria) 2005	4th place		5	2	3	12	11
(Kenya) 2007	3rd place	3rd place, bronze medalist(s)	6	5	1	16	6
(Algeria) 2009	2nd place	2nd place, silver medalist(s)	5	4	1	12	3
(Kenya) 2011	6th place		6	3	3	15	9
(Kenya) 2013	3rd place	3rd place, bronze medalist(s)	5	3	2	11	9
(Kenya) 2015	5th place		5	3	2	13	8
(Cameroon) 2017	5th place		6	4	2	13	8
(Egypt) 2019	did not compete						
(Rwanda) 2021	5th place		4	2	2	6	6
(Cameroon) 2023	did not compete due to COVID-19 pandemic in team						
Total *	16/21	3 titles					

=== Arab Championship ===
Tunisia in the Women's Arab Championship record
Year	Round	Position	GP	W	L	SW	SL
1980	Champions	1st place, gold medalist(s)	?	?	?	?	?
1989	Champions	1st place, gold medalist(s)	?	?	?	?	?
Total	2/?	2 titles	?	?	?	?	?

=== Mediterranean Games ===
Tunisia in the Mediterranean Games
Year	Round	Position	GP	W	L	SW	SL
(Algeria) 1975	did not compete						
(Socialist Federal Republic of Yugoslavia) 1979	did not compete						
(Morocco) 1983	did not compete						
(Syria) 1987	did not compete						
(Greece) 1991	did not compete						
(France) 1993	did not compete						
(Italy) 1997	did not compete						
(Tunisia) 2001	Group Stages	8th					
(Spain) 2005	did not compete						
(Italy) 2009	did not compete						
(Turkey) 2013	did not compete						
(Spain) 2018	did not compete						
(Algeria) 2022	Quarter-finals	8th	6	1	5	5	15
Total 2/13							

* Since 2001.

=== All-Africa Games ===
Tunisia in the African Games record
Year	Round	Position	GP	W	L	SW	SL
(Algeria) 1978	4th	?	?	?	?	?	?
(Kenya) 1987	did not compete						
(Egypt) 1991	did not compete						
(Zimbabwe) 1995	did not compete						
(South Africa) 1999	did not compete						
(Nigeria) 2003	did not compete						
(Algeria) 2007	5th	?	?	?	?	?	?
(Mozambique) 2011	did not compete						
(Republic of the Congo) 2015	did not compete						
(Morocco) 2019	did not compete						
(Ghana) 2023	future event						
Total	2/10	0 title					

=== Pan Arab Games ===
Tunisia in the Pan Arab Games
Year	Round	Position	GP	W	L	SW	SL
(Morocco) 1985	2nd	2nd place, silver medalist(s)	?	?	?	?	?
(Syria) 1992	2nd	2nd place, silver medalist(s)	?	?	?	?	?
(Lebanon) 1997	did not compete						
(Jordan) 1999	2nd	2nd place, silver medalist(s)	?	?	?	?	?
(Algeria) 2004	canceled						
(Egypt) 2007	canceled						
(Qatar) 2011	did not compete						
(Algeria) 2023	2nd	2nd place, silver medalist(s)	?	?	?	?	?
Total	4/6	0 title					

== Current squad ==
The following is the Tunisian roster in the 2022 Mediterranean Games

Head coach: (Tunisia) Mohamed Messelmani

No.	Name	Date of birth	Height	Position	2021–22 club
2	Mouna Hamouda	10 June 1996 (aged 26)	1.75 m (5 ft 9 in)	Libero	(Tunisia) Club Féminine de Carthage
3	Dhouha Engazou	11 December 2003 (aged 18)	1.80 m (5 ft 11 in)	Outside spiker	
4	Chourouk Galai	26 September 1997 (aged 24)	1.85 m (6 ft 1 in)	Middle blocker	
7	Rahma Agrebi	2 November 1990 (aged 31)	1.76 m (5 ft 9 in)	Opposite hitter	(Tunisia) Club Féminine de Carthage
8	Abir Othmani	29 January 1991 (aged 31)	1.80 m (5 ft 11 in)	Middle blocker	(Tunisia) Club Féminine de Carthage
10	Eya Ismail	13 May 2001 (aged 21)	1.83 m (6 ft 0 in)	Opposite hitter	(Tunisia) CS Sfaxien
12	Ameni Ghizaoui	30 March 2002 (aged 20)	1.76 m (5 ft 9 in)	Outside spiker	
13	Sirine Bouraoui	12 October 1998 (aged 23)	1.81 m (5 ft 11 in)	Outside spiker	(Tunisia) Club Féminine de Carthage
14	Hiba Fatnassi	1 July 2003 (aged 18)	1.70 m (5 ft 7 in)	Setter	
15	Nihel Kebaier	8 August 1993 (aged 28)	1.73 m (5 ft 8 in)	Setter	(Tunisia) Club Féminine de Carthage
17	Sahar Jenhani	1 August 2005 (aged 16)	1.70 m (5 ft 7 in)	Middle blocker	
20	Nesrine Abda	20 July 2004 (aged 17)	1.90 m (6 ft 3 in)	Opposite hitter	

== See also ==
- Tunisia men's national volleyball team
- Tunisia women's national under-23 volleyball team
- Tunisia women's national under-20 volleyball team
- Tunisia women's national under-18 volleyball team
- Tunisian Volleyball Federation
