= 1989 FIVB Volleyball Women's World Cup =

1989 Women's World Cup
Tournament details
- Host country: Japan
- Dates: 7–14 November
- Teams: 8
- Venue: (in 1 host city)

Final positions
- Champions: Cuba (1st title)

Tournament awards
- MVP: (Cuba) Mireya Luis

The 1989 FIVB Women's World Cup was held from 7 to 14 November 1989 in Japan.

== Teams ==
Teams	Continents
Japan	Host country
China	Asia
South Korea	Asia
Soviet Union	Europe
East Germany	Europe
Cuba	Americas
Canada	Americas
Peru	Americas

== Results ==
Pos	Team	Pld	W	L	Pts	SW	SL	SR	SPW	SPL	SPR
1	Cuba	7	7	0	14	21	1	21.000	324	183	1.770
2	Soviet Union	7	6	1	13	18	6	3.000	329	266	1.237
3	China	7	5	2	12	17	6	2.833	316	187	1.690
4	Japan	7	4	3	11	13	11	1.182	321	266	1.207
5	Peru	7	2	5	9	9	18	0.500	290	358	0.810
6	East Germany	7	2	5	9	8	17	0.471	225	346	0.650
7	South Korea	7	2	5	9	8	18	0.444	267	340	0.785
8	Canada	7	0	7	7	4	21	0.190	242	368	0.658

Date		Score		Set 1	Set 2	Set 3	Set 4	Set 5	Total
7 Nov	China	3–0	East Germany	15–9	15–1	15–5			45–15
7 Nov	Cuba	3–0	Peru	15–8	15–2	15–8			45–18
7 Nov	Soviet Union	3–0	South Korea	15–12	15–13	15–13			45–38
7 Nov	Japan	3–1	Canada	13–15	15–6	15–11	15–8		58–40
8 Nov	East Germany	3–0	Canada	15–12	15–10	15–12			45–34
8 Nov	Cuba	3–0	Soviet Union	15–4	15–6	15–12			45–22
8 Nov	China	3–0	Peru	15–9	15–5	15–8			45–22
8 Nov	Japan	3–0	South Korea	15–6	15–7	15–2			45–15
9 Nov	South Korea	3–2	East Germany	15–4	8–15	15–5	13–15	15–8	66–47
9 Nov	Cuba	3–1	China	15–6	7–15	15–11	15–7		52–39
9 Nov	Peru	3–1	Canada	15–8	15–10	14–16	15–11		59–45
9 Nov	Soviet Union	3–1	Japan	17–16	15–11	12–15	15–9		59–51
11 Nov	China	3–0	Canada	15–0	15–7	15–5			45–12
11 Nov	Soviet Union	3–0	East Germany	17–16	15–10	15–3			47–29
11 Nov	Peru	3–2	South Korea	4–15	16–17	15–9	15–13	15–4	65–58
11 Nov	Cuba	3–0	Japan	16–14	15–12	15–13			46–39
12 Nov	China	3–0	South Korea	15–3	15–1	15–5			45–9
12 Nov	Soviet Union	3–0	Peru	15–3	15–2	15–12			45–17
12 Nov	Cuba	3–0	Canada	15–9	16–14	15–6			46–29
12 Nov	Japan	3–0	East Germany	15–7	15–4	15–5			45–16
13 Nov	Cuba	3–0	East Germany	15–6	15–4	15–2			45–12
13 Nov	Soviet Union	3–1	China	7–15	15–10	16–14	15–13		53–52
13 Nov	South Korea	3–1	Canada	12–15	15–11	15–10	15–12		57–48
13 Nov	Japan	3–1	Peru	14–16	15–12	15–8	15–9		59–45
14 Nov	East Germany	3–2	Peru	9–15	6–15	15–7	16–14	15–13	61–64
14 Nov	Cuba	3–0	South Korea	15–8	15–12	15–4			45–24
14 Nov	Soviet Union	3–1	Canada	15–8	13–15	15–9	15–2		58–34
14 Nov	China	3–0	Japan	15–13	15–4	15–7			45–24

== Final standing ==
Rank	Team
1st place, gold medalist(s)	Cuba
2nd place, silver medalist(s)	Soviet Union
3rd place, bronze medalist(s)	China
4	Japan
5	Peru
6	East Germany
7	South Korea
8	Canada

1989 Women's World Cup champions

Cuba
1st title

Team roster
Mireya Luis, Lilia Izquierdo, Josefina O'Farrill, Regla Bell, Tania Ortiz, Mercedes Calderón, Magalys Carvajal, Norka Latamblet, Imilsis Téllez
Head coach
Antonio Perdomo

== Awards ==
- Most valuable player
  (Cuba) Mireya Luis
- Best spiker
  (Cuba) Mireya Luis
- Best blocker
  (Cuba) Magaly Carvajal
- Best setter
  (Japan) Kumi Nakada
- Best defender
  (Japan) Ichiko Sato
- Best server
  (South Korea) Chang Yoon-hee
- Best receiver
  (Canada) Monica Lueg
- Best coach
  (Cuba) Antonio Perdomo
- Spirit of fight
  (Japan) Mayumi Saito
