= 1985 FIVB Volleyball Women's World Cup =

1985 Women's World Cup
Tournament details
- Host country: Japan
- Dates: 10–20 November
- Teams: 8
- Venue: (in 4 host cities)

Final positions
- Champions: China (2nd title)

Tournament awards
- MVP: (China) Lang Ping

The 1985 FIVB Women's World Cup was held from 10 to 20 November 1985 in four cities in Japan such as Sapporo, Iwamizawa, Fukuoka, and Tokyo.

== Qualification ==
Competition	Date	Host	Qualified
Host country	–	–	Japan
1982 World Championship	12–25 September 1982	(Peru) Lima	Peru
1983 Asian Championsnip	10–17 November 1983	(Japan) Fukuoka	South Korea
1984 Olympic Games	30 July – 7 August 1984	(United States) California	China
1985 African Championship	10–15 March 1985	(Tunisia) Tunis	Tunisia
1985 South American Championship	25 July – 1 August 1985	(Venezuela) Caracas	Brazil
1985 NORCECA Championship	27 September – 6 October 1985	(Dominican Republic) Santiago	Cuba
1985 European Championship	29 September – 6 October 1985	(Netherlands) Arnhem	Soviet Union
Total			8

== Results ==
Pos	Team	Pld	W	L	Pts	SW	SL	SR	SPW	SPL	SPR
1	China	7	7	0	14	21	1	21.000	322	153	2.105
2	Cuba	7	6	1	13	19	3	6.333	318	174	1.828
3	Soviet Union	7	5	2	12	15	7	2.143	277	225	1.231
4	Japan	7	4	3	11	12	10	1.200	264	244	1.082
5	Peru	7	3	4	10	9	14	0.643	260	263	0.989
6	Brazil	7	2	5	9	9	17	0.529	266	318	0.836
7	South Korea	7	1	6	8	6	18	0.333	247	305	0.810
8	Tunisia	7	0	7	7	0	21	0.000	43	315	0.137

Location: Sapporo

Date		Score		Set 1	Set 2	Set 3	Set 4	Set 5	Total
10 Nov	Cuba	3–0	South Korea	15–4	15–13	15–11			45–28
10 Nov	Soviet Union	3–1	Brazil	15–0	15–10	5–15	15–12		50–37
10 Nov	China	3–0	Tunisia	15–0	15–2	15–1			45–3
10 Nov	Japan	3–0	Peru	15–10	15–5	15–10			45–25
11 Nov	China	3–0	South Korea	15–6	15–11	15–5			45–22
11 Nov	Soviet Union	3–0	Peru	15–12	15–5	15–6			45–23

Location: Iwamizawa

Date		Score		Set 1	Set 2	Set 3	Set 4	Set 5	Total
11 Nov	Japan	3–0	Tunisia	15–0	15–5	15–2			45–7
11 Nov	Cuba	3–0	Brazil	15–6	15–7	15–6			45–19

Location: Sapporo

Date		Score		Set 1	Set 2	Set 3	Set 4	Set 5	Total
13 Nov	Japan	3–1	South Korea	15–3	5–15	15–12	19–17		54–47
13 Nov	Cuba	3–0	Soviet Union	15–6	15–13	15–8			45–27
13 Nov	Peru	3–0	Tunisia	15–2	15–2	15–0			45–4
13 Nov	China	3–0	Brazil	15–5	15–2	15–10			45–17

Location: Fukuoka

Date		Score		Set 1	Set 2	Set 3	Set 4	Set 5	Total
16 Nov	China	3–0	Soviet Union	16–14	15–2	15–4			46–20
16 Nov	South Korea	3–0	Tunisia	15–1	15–3	15–2			45–6
16 Nov	Cuba	3–0	Peru	15–11	15–7	15–7			45–25
16 Nov	Japan	3–0	Brazil	16–14	15–13	15–3			46–30
17 Nov	China	3–1	Cuba	16–14	15–7	5–15	15–12		51–48
17 Nov	Brazil	3–0	Tunisia	15–0	15–4	15–8			45–12
17 Nov	Soviet Union	3–0	Japan	15–12	15–13	15–11			45–36
17 Nov	Peru	3–0	South Korea	15–7	16–14	15–4			46–25

Location: Tokyo

Date		Score		Set 1	Set 2	Set 3	Set 4	Set 5	Total
19 Nov	Soviet Union	3–0	Tunisia	15–4	15–0	15–2			45–6
19 Nov	Brazil	3–2	South Korea	11–15	15–4	8–15	15–9	15–5	64–48
19 Nov	China	3–0	Peru	15–7	15–7	15–10			45–24
19 Nov	Cuba	3–0	Japan	15–6	15–4	15–9			45–19
20 Nov	China	3–0	Japan	15–8	15–5	15–6			45–19
20 Nov	Soviet Union	3–0	South Korea	15–9	15–10	15–13			45–32
20 Nov	Cuba	3–0	Tunisia	15–1	15–3	15–1			45–5
20 Nov	Peru	3–2	Brazil	13–15	15–13	15–3	14–16	15–7	72–54

== Final standing ==
Rank	Team
1st place, gold medalist(s)	China
2nd place, silver medalist(s)	Cuba
3rd place, bronze medalist(s)	Soviet Union
4	Japan
5	Peru
6	Brazil
7	South Korea
8	Tunisia

1985 Women's World Cup champions

China
2nd title

Team roster
Lang Ping (c), Liang Yan, Lin Guoqing, Hou Yuzhu, Yin Qin, Yang Xilan, Su Huijuan, Jiang Ying, Li Yanjun, Yang Xiaojun, Zheng Meizhu, Wu Dan
Head coach
Deng Ruozeng

== Awards ==
- Most valuable player
  (China) Lang Ping
- Best attacker
  (Cuba) Mireya Luis
- Best blocker
  (Peru) Gabriela Pérez del Solar
- Best setter
  (China) Yang Xilan
- Best server
  (Japan) Sanae Mitsuo
- Best receiver
  (Japan) Ichiko Sato
- Best Coach
  (China) Deng Ruozeng
- Spirit of fight
  (Cuba) Josefina Capote
