= Volleyball at the 1987 Pan American Games =

- Start date: August 7, 1987
- End date: August 23, 1987

The Men's and Women's Volleyball Tournaments which took place during the 1987 Pan American Games, which was held from August 7 to August 23, 1987, in Indianapolis, United States. Events were held at the Hinkle Fieldhouse.

== Men's indoor tournament ==
=== Preliminary round robin ===
	Team	Points	G	W	L	SW	SL	Ratio
1.	United States	9	5	4	1	14	4	3.500
2.	Cuba	9	5	4	1	13	5	2.600
3.	Brazil	8	5	3	2	11	8	1.375
4.	Argentina	8	5	3	2	9	6	1.500
5.	Canada	6	5	1	4	3	12	0.250
6.	Dominican Republic	5	5	0	5	0	15	0.000

=== Final round ===
Semifinals
1987-08-21 – Indianapolis
United States	3
Argentina	2
1987-08-21 – Indianapolis
Cuba	3
Brazil	2

Final
1987-08-23 – Indianapolis
United States	3
Cuba	2
3rd Place
1987-08-23 – Indianapolis
Argentina	1
Brazil	3

=== Final ranking ===
Place	Team
1.	United States
2.	Cuba
3.	Brazil
4.	Argentina
5.	Canada
6.	Dominican Republic

1987 Pan American Games winners

United States
Fourth title

== Women's indoor tournament ==
=== Preliminary round robin ===
	Team	Points	G	W	L	SW	SL	Ratio
1.	Cuba	8	4	4	0	12	0	MAX
2.	Peru	7	4	3	1	9	4	2.250
3.	Brazil	6	4	2	2	6	7	0.857
4.	United States	5	4	1	3	5	10	0.500
5.	Canada	4	4	0	4	1	12	0.083

=== Final round ===
Semifinals
1987-08-20 – Indianapolis
Peru	3
Brazil	0
1987-08-20 – Indianapolis
Cuba	3
United States	0

Final
1987-08-22 – Indianapolis
Peru	0
Cuba	3
3rd Place
1987-08-22 – Indianapolis
Brazil	1
United States	3

=== Final ranking ===
Place	Team
1.	Cuba
2.	Peru
3.	United States
4.	Brazil
5.	Canada

1987 Pan American Games winners

Cuba
Fifth title
