= FIVB Women's Volleyball World Cup (1973–2019) =

Former volleyball tournament

- Most recent season or competition: 2019 FIVB Volleyball Women's World Cup
- Sport: Volleyball
- Founded: 1973; 53 years ago
- First season: 1973
- Folded: 2019; 7 years ago
- Replaced by: FIVB Women's Volleyball World Cup (2027–present)
- No. of teams: 12
- Continent: International (FIVB)
- Last champions: China (5th title)
- Most titles: China (5 titles)
- Streaming partner: Volleyball TV (2019)

The FIVB Volleyball Women's World Cup was an international volleyball competition contested by the senior women's national teams of the members of Fédération Internationale de Volleyball (FIVB), the sport's global governing body, from 1973 to 2019. Initially the tournament was played in the year following the Olympic Games, but since 1991 the World Cup has been awarded in the year preceding the Olympic Games.

The historical format of the competition involved 12 teams, including the automatically qualifying host nation Japan, competing in the tournament phase for the title at venues within the host nation over a period of about two weeks. The World Cup (with exception of the 2019 edition) acted as the first qualification event for the following year's Olympic Games with the top two teams qualifying.

The 13 World Cup tournaments were won by six different national teams. China have won five times. The other World Cup winners are Cuba, with four titles; Italy, with two titles; Japan and Russia (as Soviet Union) with one title each.

== History ==
=== Origins ===
The World Cup was created in 1965 with the purpose of partially filling the gap between the two most important volleyball tournaments, the Olympic Games and the World Championship, which take place in alternating 4-year cycles. The establishment of a third international competition would leave only one in every four years with no major events. The World Cup has a smaller entry than the World Championship, with at most 12 teams.

The World Cup was to be held in the year following the Olympic Games. The first two tournaments were for men's volleyball only; in 1973, a women's tournament was also introduced. Originally, each tournament had a different host, but in 1977 the competition was transferred to Japan on a permanent basis.

In the 1990s, the installment of annual international events such as the World League and the Grand Prix made the original motivations for the creation of the World Cup obsolete.

Instead of letting a consolidated event disappear for lack of interest, the FIVB decided to change its format in 1991: it would be held in the year preceding, and not following, the Olympic Games; and it would be considered a first international Olympic qualification tournament, granting the winner a direct berth in the games. The possibility of securing an early berth for the Olympic Games, thus avoiding extraneous and in some cases tight continental qualification procedures, became a consistent motivation for the national federations to participate in the World Cup. In 1995, the number of Olympic spots granted at the competition was increased to three, as it remained until 2011. In 2015 the number of spots was only two again.

=== Winners ===
The Women's World Cup has had not one great winner, like its counterpart for men's volleyball, but two: China and Cuba.

The first edition of the tournament was won by the Soviet Union. Japan, the runner-up of 1973, took the gold in 1977. With the help of superstar player Lang Ping, China won the following two editions, in 1981 and 1985.

Then Cuba stepped forward to begin its amazing World Cup career, winning its first title in 1989. With the tournament now as an Olympic qualifier, there followed three more consecutive victories, in 1991, 1995 and 1999.

China won its third title in 2003.

Italy won the 2007 edition with an outstanding record of eleven wins in eleven games and only two sets left to the opponents (both lost against Serbia). Italy took a second win in a row in 2011, getting the better hand on United States and China. In 2015, China regained the title and then successfully defended it in 2019.

== Competition formula ==
The World Cup was the most stable from all competition formulas employed by the FIVB. The following rules applied:

- The competition took place in Japan.
- Twelve teams participated in each event: ten qualified, two per invitation.
  - Japan were always pre-qualified as host nation.
  - The winners of the FIVB World Championship in the previous year were automatically granted a spot.
  - The champion and runner-up of each continental tournament of that year were granted two spots.
  - Since the 1999 edition, only teams not yet qualified for the following Olympic Games could compete in the World Cup; hence hosts of the following year's Olympic Games were not allowed to compete. There was an exception for the 2019 World Cup, as the tournament was hosted by Japan and the country hosted the 2020 Summer Olympics.
- The competition was divided in exactly two phases (called "legs").
  - Teams were divided in two pools.
    - At the first leg, each team played one match against all other teams in its pool.
    - At the second leg, each team played one match against all the teams in the other pool.
  - Matches took place continuously through two weeks, with one-day breaks every two or three days. Each day, six matches were played.
  - Final standings were calculated by usual volleyball criteria: match points, numbers of matches won, sets ratio (the total number of sets won divided by the total number of sets lost), points ratio, direct confrontation.
- The top two teams in overall standings, regardless of pools, qualified for the following Olympic Games.
- The tournament implemented very tight line-up restrictions: only twelve players were allowed, and no replacement was permitted, even in the case of injuries.

== Results summary ==
| Year | Host | Champions | Runners-up | 3rd place | 4th place | Teams |
|---|---|---|---|---|---|---|
| 1973; Details | Uruguay | Soviet Union | Japan | South Korea | Peru | 10 |
| 1977; Details | Japan | Japan | Cuba | South Korea | China | 8 |
| 1981; Details | Japan | China | Japan | Soviet Union | United States | 8 |
| 1985; Details | Japan | China | Cuba | Soviet Union | Japan | 8 |
| 1989; Details | Japan | Cuba | Soviet Union | China | Japan | 8 |
| 1991; Details | Japan | Cuba | China | Soviet Union | United States | 12 |
| 1995; Details | Japan | Cuba | Brazil | China | Croatia | 12 |
| 1999; Details | Japan | Cuba | Russia | Brazil | South Korea | 12 |
| 2003; Details | Japan | China | Brazil | United States | Italy | 12 |
| 2007; Details | Japan | Italy | Brazil | United States | Cuba | 12 |
| 2011; Details | Japan | Italy | United States | China | Japan | 12 |
| 2015; Details | Japan | China | Serbia | United States | Russia | 12 |
| 2019; Details | Japan | China | United States | Russia | Brazil | 12 |

== Medals summary ==
| Rank | Nation | Gold | Silver | Bronze | Total |
|---|---|---|---|---|---|
| 1 | China | 5 | 1 | 3 | 9 |
| 2 | Cuba | 4 | 2 | 0 | 6 |
| 3 | Italy | 2 | 0 | 0 | 2 |
| 4 | Japan | 1 | 2 | 0 | 3 |
| 5 | Soviet Union | 1 | 1 | 3 | 5 |
| 6 | Brazil | 0 | 3 | 1 | 4 |
| 7 | United States | 0 | 2 | 3 | 5 |
| 8 | Russia | 0 | 1 | 1 | 2 |
| 9 | Serbia | 0 | 1 | 0 | 1 |
| 10 | South Korea | 0 | 0 | 2 | 2 |
| Totals (10 entries) | | 13 | 13 | 13 | 39 |

== Debut of national teams ==
| Year | Debutants | Total |
|---|---|---|
| 1973 | Argentina, Brazil, Canada, Cuba, Japan, Peru, South Korea, Soviet Union, United States, Uruguay | 10 |
| 1977 | Hungary, China | 2 |
| 1981 | Bulgaria | 1 |
| 1985 | Tunisia | 1 |
| 1989 | East Germany | 1 |
| 1991 | Germany, Kenya, Spain | 3 |
| 1995 | Croatia, Egypt, Netherlands | 2 |
| 1999 | Italy, Russia | 2 |
| 2003 | Dominican Republic, Poland, Turkey | 4 |
| 2007 | Serbia, Thailand | 2 |
| 2011 | Algeria | 1 |
| 2015 | None | 0 |
| 2019 | Cameroon | 1 |
| 2023 | Belgium, Puerto Rico | 2 |

== Participating nations ==
Legend

- 1st – Champions
- 2nd – Runners-up
- 3rd – Third place
- 4th – Fourth place
- • – Did not enter / Did not qualify
- – Hosts
- = – More than one team tied for that rank
- Q – Qualified for forthcoming tournament

| Team | (Uruguay); 1973 (10) | (Japan); 1977 (8) | (Japan); 1981 (8) | (Japan); 1985 (8) | (Japan); 1989 (8) | (Japan); 1991 (12) | (Japan); 1995 (12) | (Japan); 1999 (12) | (Japan); 2003 (12) | (Japan); 2007 (12) | (Japan); 2011 (12) | (Japan); 2015 (12) | (Japan); 2019 (12) | Total |
| Algeria | • | • | • | • | • | • | • | • | • | • | 11th | 12th | • | 2 |
| Argentina | 8th | • | • | • | • | • | • | 11th | 11th | • | 10th | 8th | 10th | 6 |
| Brazil | 9th | • | 8th | 6th | • | 8th | 2nd | 3rd | 2nd | 2nd | 5th | • | 4th | 10 |
| Bulgaria | • | • | 7th | • | • | • | • | • | • | • | • | • | • | 2 |
| Cameroon | • | • | • | • | • | • | • | • | • | • | • | • | 12th | 1 |
| Canada | 7th | • | • | • | 8th | 10th | 9th | • | • | • | • | • | • | 4 |
| China | • | 4th | 1st | 1st | 3rd | 2nd | 3rd | 5th | 1st | • | 3rd | 1st | 1st | 11 |
| Croatia | Part of Yugoslavia | | | | | | 4th | 8th | • | • | • | • | • | 2 |
| Cuba | 5th | 2nd | 6th | 2nd | 1st | 1st | 1st | 1st | 6th | 4th | • | 9th | • | 11 |
| Dominican Republic | • | • | • | • | • | • | • | • | 10th | 9th | 8th | 7th | 7th | 5 |
| Egypt | • | • | • | • | • | • | 12th | • | 12th | • | • | • | • | 2 |
| Germany | See East Germany and West Germany | | | | | 9th | • | • | • | • | 6th | • | • | 2 |
| Hungary | • | 6th | • | • | • | • | • | • | • | • | • | • | • | 1 |
| Italy | • | • | • | • | • | • | • | 7th | 4th | 1st | 1st | • | • | 4 |
| Japan | 2nd | 1st | 2nd | 4th | 4th | 7th | 6th | 6th | 5th | 7th | 4th | 5th | 5th | 13 |
| Kenya | • | • | • | • | • | 12th | 11th | • | • | 12th | 12th | 10th | 11th | 6 |
| Netherlands | • | • | • | • | • | • | 8th | • | • | • | • | • | 8th | 2 |
| Peru | 4th | 5th | • | 5th | 5th | 5th | 10th | 10th | • | 11th | • | 11th | • | 9 |
| Poland | • | • | • | • | • | • | • | • | 8th | 6th | • | • | • | 2 |
| Russia | Part of Soviet Union | | | | | | • | 2nd | • | • | • | 4th | 3rd | 3 |
| Serbia | Part of Yugoslavia | | | | | | Part of (Serbia and Montenegro) SCG | | | 5th | 7th | 2nd | 9th | 4 |
| South Korea | 3rd | 3rd | 5th | 7th | 7th | 6th | 5th | 4th | 9th | 8th | 9th | 6th | 6th | 13 |
| Spain | • | • | • | • | • | 11th | • | • | • | • | • | • | • | 1 |
| Thailand | • | • | • | • | • | • | • | • | • | 10th | • | • | • | 1 |
| Tunisia | • | • | • | 8th | • | • | • | 12th | • | • | • | • | • | 2 |
| Turkey | • | • | • | • | • | • | • | • | 7th | • | • | • | • | 1 |
| United States | 6th | 7th | 4th | • | • | 4th | 7th | 9th | 3rd | 3rd | 2nd | 3rd | 2nd | 11 |
| Uruguay | 10th | • | • | • | • | • | • | • | • | • | • | • | • | 1 |
Discontinued nations
| East Germany | • | • | • | • | 6th | defunct | | | | | | | | 1 |
| Soviet Union | 1st | 8th | 3rd | 3rd | 2nd | 3rd | defunct | | | | | | | 6 |

== Most valuable player by edition ==
- 1973 – Jo Hea-jung (KOR)
- 1977 – Takako Shirai (JPN)
- 1981 – Sun Jinfang (CHN)
- 1985 – Lang Ping (CHN)
- 1989 – Mireya Luis (CUB)
- 1991 – Caren Kemner (USA)
- 1995 – Mireya Luis (CUB)
- 1999 – Taismary Agüero (CUB)
- 2003 – Małgorzata Glinka (POL)
- 2007 – Simona Gioli (ITA)
- 2011 – Carolina Costagrande (ITA)
- 2015 – Zhu Ting (CHN)
- 2019 – Zhu Ting (CHN)

== See also ==
- Volleyball at the Summer Olympics
- FIVB Volleyball World Grand Champions Cup
- FIVB Volleyball World Grand Prix
- FIVB Women's Volleyball Nations League
- List of indoor volleyball world medalists
