= 1986 FIVB Women's Volleyball World Championship =

Volleyball competition in Czechoslovakia

1986 FIVB Women's World Championship
Tournament details
- Host country: Czechoslovakia
- Dates: 2–13 September
- Teams: 16
- Officially opened by: Gustáv Husák

Final positions
- Champions: China (2nd title)
- Runners-up: Cuba
- Third place: Peru
- Fourth place: East Germany

Tournament awards
- MVP: (China) Yang Xilan

The 1986 FIVB Women's World Championship was the tenth edition of the tournament, organised by the world's governing body, the FIVB. It was held from 2 to 13 September 1986 in Czechoslovakia.

== Teams ==
Group A

- Bulgaria
- Canada
- Czechoslovakia
- South Korea

Group B

- China
- East Germany
- Tunisia
- Soviet Union

Group C

- Brazil
- Cuba
- Peru
- West Germany

Group D

- Italy
- Japan
- North Korea
- United States

== Results ==
=== First round ===
==== Pool A ====
Location: Žilina

Pos	Team	Pld	W	L	Pts	SW	SL	SR	SPW	SPL	SPR	Qualification
1	South Korea	3	3	0	6	9	0	MAX	135	71	1.901	1st–12th pools
2	Bulgaria	3	2	1	5	6	6	1.000	162	143	1.133	1st–12th pools
3	Czechoslovakia	3	1	2	4	5	6	0.833	120	136	0.882	1st–12th pools
4	Canada	3	0	3	3	1	9	0.111	81	148	0.547	13th–16th places

Date	Time		Score		Set 1	Set 2	Set 3	Set 4	Set 5	Total
2 Sep	16:30	Bulgaria	3–2	Czechoslovakia	16–14	15–8	11–15	12–15	15–4	69–56
2 Sep	20:00	South Korea	3–0	Canada	15–9	15–1	15–7			45–17
3 Sep	16:30	South Korea	3–0	Bulgaria	15–13	15–10	15–12			45–35
3 Sep	20:00	Czechoslovakia	3–0	Canada	15–10	15–8	15–4			45–22
4 Sep	16:30	Bulgaria	3–1	Canada	15–12	15–6	13–15	15–9		58–42
4 Sep	20:00	South Korea	3–0	Czechoslovakia	15–3	15–11	15–5			45–19

==== Pool B ====
Location: Plzeň

Pos	Team	Pld	W	L	Pts	SW	SL	SR	SPW	SPL	SPR	Qualification
1	China	3	3	0	6	9	1	9.000	147	73	2.014	1st–12th pools
2	East Germany	3	2	1	5	7	5	1.400	148	119	1.244	1st–12th pools
3	Soviet Union	3	1	2	4	5	6	0.833	134	117	1.145	1st–12th pools
4	Tunisia	3	0	3	3	0	9	0.000	15	135	0.111	13th–16th places

Date	Time		Score		Set 1	Set 2	Set 3	Set 4	Set 5	Total
2 Sep	16:30	China	3–1	East Germany	12–15	15–6	15–10	15–4		57–35
2 Sep	20:00	Soviet Union	3–0	Tunisia	15–1	15–2	15–1			45–4
3 Sep	16:30	East Germany	3–2	Soviet Union	12–15	11–15	15–11	15–6	15–9	68–56
3 Sep	20:00	China	3–0	Tunisia	15–0	15–3	15–2			45–5
4 Sep	16:30	East Germany	3–0	Tunisia	15–2	15–1	15–3			45–6
4 Sep	20:00	China	3–0	Soviet Union	15–9	15–11	15–13			45–33

==== Pool C ====
Location: Brno

Pos	Team	Pld	W	L	Pts	SW	SL	SR	SPW	SPL	SPR	Qualification
1	Cuba	3	3	0	6	9	2	4.500	160	110	1.455	1st–12th pools
2	Peru	3	2	1	5	8	4	2.000	164	143	1.147	1st–12th pools
3	Brazil	3	1	2	4	4	7	0.571	129	157	0.822	1st–12th pools
4	West Germany	3	0	3	3	1	9	0.111	103	146	0.705	13th–16th places

Date	Time		Score		Set 1	Set 2	Set 3	Set 4	Set 5	Total
2 Sep	16:30	Cuba	3–0	Brazil	15–9	15–9	15–12			45–30
2 Sep	20:00	Peru	3–0	West Germany	15–4	15–4	15–11			45–19
3 Sep	16:30	Peru	3–1	Brazil	15–5	10–15	15–7	15–10		55–37
3 Sep	20:00	Cuba	3–0	West Germany	15–9	15–2	15–9			45–20
4 Sep	16:00	Brazil	3–1	West Germany	8–15	15–11	15–13	15-6		53–45
4 Sep	20:00	Cuba	3–2	Peru	11–15	15–11	15–8	14–16	15–10	70–60

==== Pool D ====
Location: Olomouc

Pos	Team	Pld	W	L	Pts	SW	SL	SR	SPW	SPL	SPR	Qualification
1	Japan	3	3	0	6	9	2	4.500	160	111	1.441	1st–12th pools
2	United States	3	2	1	5	7	4	1.750	144	131	1.099	1st–12th pools
3	Italy	3	1	2	4	4	6	0.667	118	122	0.967	1st–12th pools
4	North Korea	3	0	3	3	1	9	0.111	92	150	0.613	13th–16th places

Date	Time		Score		Set 1	Set 2	Set 3	Set 4	Set 5	Total
2 Sep	12:00	Japan	3–1	North Korea	15–6	13–15	15–9	15–8		58–38
2 Sep	20:00	United States	3–1	Italy	15–7	8–15	15–12	15–10		53–44
3 Sep	12:00	Japan	3–0	Italy	15–11	15–10	15–7			45–28
3 Sep	20:00	United States	3–0	North Korea	15–6	16–14	15–10			46–30
4 Sep	12:00	Japan	3–1	United States	12–15	15–11	15–7	15–12		57–45
4 Sep	16:30	Italy	3–0	North Korea	15–5	15–5	16–14			46–24

=== Second round ===
The results and the points of the matches between the same teams that were already played during the first round are taken into account for the second round.

==== 1st–12th pools ====
===== Pool E =====
Location: Ostrava

Pos	Team	Pld	W	L	Pts	SW	SL	SR	SPW	SPL	SPR	Qualification
1	Cuba	5	5	0	10	15	3	5.000	259	170	1.524	Finals
2	Peru	5	4	1	9	14	5	2.800	265	197	1.345	Finals
3	Brazil	5	2	3	7	9	9	1.000	239	245	0.976	5th–8th places
4	South Korea	5	2	3	7	7	9	0.778	190	197	0.964	5th–8th places
5	Bulgaria	5	2	3	7	6	13	0.462	222	265	0.838	9th–12th places
6	Czechoslovakia	5	0	5	5	3	15	0.200	162	263	0.616	9th–12th places

Date	Time		Score		Set 1	Set 2	Set 3	Set 4	Set 5	Total
7 Sep	13:00	Bulgaria	3–2	Brazil	16–14	8–15	17–15	14–16	15–13	70–73
7 Sep	16:30	Cuba	3–1	South Korea	15–12	15–8	8–15	15–3		53–38
7 Sep	20:00	Peru	3–1	Czechoslovakia	12–15	15–5	15–0	15–8		57–28
8 Sep	13:00	Cuba	3–0	Bulgaria	15–7	15–3	16–14			46–24
8 Sep	16:30	Peru	3–0	South Korea	15–8	15–11	15–12			45–31
8 Sep	20:00	Brazil	3–0	Czechoslovakia	15–13	16–14	16–14			47–41
9 Sep	13:00	Peru	3–0	Bulgaria	15–10	15–4	15–10			45–24
9 Sep	16:30	Brazil	3–0	South Korea	15–9	15–12	15–12			45–33
9 Sep	20:00	Cuba	3–0	Czechoslovakia	15–9	15–0	15–9			45–18

===== Pool F =====
Location: Prague

Pos	Team	Pld	W	L	Pts	SW	SL	SR	SPW	SPL	SPR	Qualification
1	China	5	5	0	10	15	1	15.000	237	126	1.881	Finals
2	East Germany	5	4	1	9	13	7	1.857	261	236	1.106	Finals
3	Soviet Union	5	3	2	8	11	6	1.833	224	176	1.273	5th–8th places
4	Japan	5	2	3	7	6	10	0.600	167	208	0.803	5th–8th places
5	United States	5	1	4	6	6	13	0.462	204	258	0.791	9th–12th places
6	Italy	5	0	5	5	1	15	0.067	145	234	0.620	9th–12th places

Date	Time		Score		Set 1	Set 2	Set 3	Set 4	Set 5	Total
7 Sep	13:00	Soviet Union	3–0	Italy	15–3	15–11	15–11			45–25
7 Sep	16:30	East Germany	3–0	Japan	15–11	15–9	15–11			45–31
7 Sep	20:00	China	3–0	United States	15–4	15–10	15–5			45–19
8 Sep	13:00	Soviet Union	3–0	Japan	15–0	15–8	15–8			45–16
8 Sep	16:30	China	3–0	Italy	15–4	15–4	15–13			45–21
8 Sep	20:00	East Germany	3–2	United States	15–12	9–15	15–10	13–15	15–13	67–65
9 Sep	13:00	China	3–0	Japan	15–6	15–8	15–4			45–18
9 Sep	16:30	East Germany	3–0	Italy	16–14	15–4	15–9			46–27
9 Sep	20:00	Soviet Union	3–0	United States	15–4	15–12	15–6			45–22

==== 13th–16th places ====
Location: Plzeň

Pos	Team	Pld	W	L	Pts	SW	SL	SR	SPW	SPL	SPR
13	West Germany	3	3	0	6	9	1	9.000	148	83	1.783
14	North Korea	3	2	1	5	6	3	2.000	114	80	1.425
15	Canada	3	1	2	4	4	6	0.667	123	113	1.088
16	Tunisia	3	0	3	3	0	9	0.000	26	135	0.193

Date	Time		Score		Set 1	Set 2	Set 3	Set 4	Set 5	Total
7 Sep	16:30	West Germany	3–0	North Korea	15–6	15–12	15–4			45–22
7 Sep	20:00	Canada	3–0	Tunisia	15–0	15–4	15–4			45–8
8 Sep	16:30	West Germany	3–0	Tunisia	15–0	15–3	15–6			45–9
8 Sep	20:00	North Korea	3–0	Canada	15–3	17–15	15–8			47–26
9 Sep	16:30	West Germany	3–1	Canada	17–15	11–15	15–9	15–13		58–52
9 Sep	20:00	North Korea	3–0	Tunisia	15–7	15–0	15–2			45–9

=== Final round ===
==== 9th–12th places ====
9th–12th semifinals
12 September – Žilina
Italy	3
Bulgaria	2
12 September – Žilina
United States	3
Czechoslovakia	2

9th place
13 September – Žilina
Italy	3
United States	1
11th place
13 September – Žilina
Bulgaria	1
Czechoslovakia	3

===== 9th–12th semifinals =====
Date	Time		Score		Set 1	Set 2	Set 3	Set 4	Set 5	Total
12 Sep	16:30	Italy	3–2	Bulgaria	15–12	8–15	16–14	5–15	15–12	59–68
12 Sep	20:00	United States	3–2	Czechoslovakia	7–15	15–3	10–15	15–6	15–12	62–51

===== 11th place match =====
Date	Time		Score		Set 1	Set 2	Set 3	Set 4	Set 5	Total
13 Sep	16:30	Bulgaria	1–3	Czechoslovakia	15–12	10–15	11–15	9–15		45–57

===== 9th place match =====
Date	Time		Score		Set 1	Set 2	Set 3	Set 4	Set 5	Total
13 Sep	20:00	Italy	3–1	United States	15–4	15–12	10–15	15–12		55–43

==== 5th–8th places ====
5th–8th semifinals
12 September – Ostrava
Brazil	3
Japan	1
12 September – Ostrava
Soviet Union	3
South Korea	0

5th place
13 September – Ostrava
Brazil	3
Soviet Union	0
7th place
13 September – Ostrava
Japan	3
South Korea	0

===== 5th–8th semifinals =====
Date	Time		Score		Set 1	Set 2	Set 3	Set 4	Set 5	Total
12 Sep	16:30	Brazil	3–1	Japan	15–13	15–17	17–15	16–14		63–59
12 Sep	20:00	Soviet Union	3–0	South Korea	15–13	15–10	15–8			45–31

===== 7th place match =====
Date	Time		Score		Set 1	Set 2	Set 3	Set 4	Set 5	Total
13 Sep	16:30	Japan	3–0	South Korea	15–10	15–8	16–14			46–32

===== 5th place match =====
Date	Time		Score		Set 1	Set 2	Set 3	Set 4	Set 5	Total
13 Sep	20:00	Brazil	3–0	Soviet Union	15–6	15–8	15–10			45–24

==== Finals ====
Semifinals
12 September – Prague
Cuba	3
East Germany	1
12 September – Prague
China	3
Peru	0

Final
13 September – Prague
Cuba	1
China	3
3rd place
13 September – Prague
East Germany	1
Peru	3

===== Semifinals =====
Date	Time		Score		Set 1	Set 2	Set 3	Set 4	Set 5	Total
12 Sep	16:30	Cuba	3–1	East Germany	13–15	15–3	15–7	15–3		58–28
12 Sep	20:00	China	3–0	Peru	18–16	15–2	15–8			48–26

===== 3rd place match =====
Date	Time		Score		Set 1	Set 2	Set 3	Set 4	Set 5	Total
13 Sep	16:30	East Germany	1–3	Peru	15–13	14–16	9–15	8–15		46–59

===== Final =====
Date	Time		Score		Set 1	Set 2	Set 3	Set 4	Set 5	Total
13 Sep	20:00	Cuba	1–3	China	6–15	7–15	15–10	9–15		37–55

== Final standing ==
Rank	Team
1st place, gold medalist(s)	China
2nd place, silver medalist(s)	Cuba
3rd place, bronze medalist(s)	Peru
4	East Germany
5	Brazil
6	Soviet Union
7	Japan
8	South Korea
9	Italy
10	United States
11	Czechoslovakia
12	Bulgaria
13	West Germany
14	North Korea
15	Canada
16	Tunisia

Qualified for the 1988 Olympic Games as reigning champions
Qualified for the 1988 Olympic Games

1986 Women's World champions

China
2nd title

Team roster
Hu Xiaofeng, Liang Yan, Liu Wei, Hou Yuzhu, Yin Qin, Yang Xilan (c), Su Huijuan, Jiang Ying, Li Yanjun, Yang Xiaojun, Zheng Meizhu, Wu Dan
Head coach
Zhang Rongfang

== Awards ==
- Most valuable player
  (China) Yang Xilan
- Best scorer
  (China) Yang Xilan
- Best blocker
  (Soviet Union) Valentina Ogienko
- Best defender
  (Peru) Denisse Fajardo
