= East Germany at the 1988 Summer Olympics =

- IOC code: GDR
- NOC: National Olympic Committee of the German Democratic Republic

in Seoul, South Korea 17 September – 2 October 1988
- Competitors: 259 (157 men, 102 women) in 16 sports
- Flag bearer: Ulf Timmermann
- Medals Ranked 2nd: Gold 37 Silver 35 Bronze 30 Total 102

Summer Olympics appearances (overview)
- 1968; 1972; 1976; 1980; 1984; 1988

Other related appearances
- Germany (1896–1936, 1992–pres.); United Team of Germany (1956–1964)

Athletes from East Germany (German Democratic Republic) competed at the Olympic Games for the last time as an independent nation at the 1988 Summer Olympics in Seoul, South Korea. Following German reunification in 1990, a single German team would compete in the 1992 Summer Olympics. 259 competitors, 157 men and 102 women, took part in 157 events in 16 sports. The team was officially announced on 3 September 1988.

== Medalists ==
Medal	Name	Sport	Event	Date
Gold	Uwe Ampler; Mario Kummer; Maik Landsmann; Jan Schur	Cycling	Men's team time trial	18 September
Gold	Kristin Otto	Swimming	Women's 100 metre freestyle	19 September
Gold	Heike Friedrich	Swimming	Women's 200 metre freestyle	21 September
Gold	Silke Hörner	Swimming	Women's 200 metre breaststroke	21 September
Gold	Joachim Kunz	Weightlifting	Men's 67.5 kg	21 September
Gold	Heike Friedrich; Daniela Hunger; Katrin Meißner; Kristin Otto; Sabina Schulze; Manuela Stellmach	Swimming	Women's 4 × 100 metre freestyle relay	22 September
Gold	Kristin Otto	Swimming	Women's 100 metre backstroke	22 September
Gold	Ulf Timmermann	Athletics	Men's shot put	23 September
Gold	Uwe Daßler	Swimming	Men's 400 metre freestyle	23 September
Gold	Kristin Otto	Swimming	Women's 100 metre butterfly	23 September
Gold	Gerlinde Doberschütz; Carola Hornig; Sylvia Rose; Birte Siech; Martina Walther	Rowing	Women's coxed four	24 September
Gold	Birgit Peter; Martina Schröter	Rowing	Women's double sculls	24 September
Gold	Bernd Eichwurzel; Frank Klawonn; Bernd Niesecke; Hendrik Reiher; Karsten Schmeling	Rowing	Men's coxed four	24 September
Gold	Thomas Lange	Rowing	Men's single sculls	24 September
Gold	Holger Behrendt	Gymnastics	Men's rings	24 September
Gold	Axel Wegner	Shooting	Skeet	24 September
Gold	Lutz Heßlich	Cycling	Men's sprint	24 September
Gold	Daniela Hunger	Swimming	Women's 200 metre individual medley	24 September
Gold	Silke Hörner; Katrin Meißner; Kristin Otto; Cornelia Sirch; Manuela Stellmach; Birte Weigang	Swimming	Women's 4 × 100 metre medley relay	24 September
Gold	Jutta Behrendt	Rowing	Women's single sculls	25 September
Gold	Kerstin Förster; Kristina Mundt; Beate Schramm; Jana Sorgers	Rowing	Women's quadruple sculls	25 September
Gold	Ramona Balthasar; Kathrin Haacker; Anja Kluge; Daniela Neunast; Beatrix Schröer; Ute Stange; Annegret Strauch; Ute Wild; Judith Zeidler	Rowing	Women's eight	25 September
Gold	Ralf Brudel; Olaf Förster; Thomas Greiner; Roland Schröder	Rowing	Men's coxless four	25 September
Gold	Kristin Otto	Swimming	Women's 50 metre freestyle	25 September
Gold	Kathleen Nord	Swimming	Women's 200 metre butterfly	25 September
Gold	Sigrun Wodars	Athletics	Women's 800 metres	26 September
Gold	Petra Felke	Athletics	Women's javelin throw	26 September
Gold	Olaf Ludwig	Cycling	Men's individual road race	27 September
Gold	Thomas Flach; Bernd Jäkel; Jochen Schümann	Sailing	Soling	27 September
Gold	Martina Hellmann	Athletics	Women's discus throw	29 September
Gold	Christian Schenk	Athletics	Men's decathlon	29 September
Gold	Olaf Heukrodt	Canoeing	Men's C-1 500 metres	30 September
Gold	Anke Nothnagel; Birgit Schmidt	Canoeing	Women's K-2 500 metres	30 September
Gold	Anke Nothnagel; Ramona Portwich; Birgit Schmidt; Heike Singer	Canoeing	Women's K-4 500 metres	1 October
Gold	Andreas Zülow	Boxing	Lightweight	1 October
Gold	Henry Maske	Boxing	Middleweight	1 October
Gold	Jürgen Schult	Athletics	Men's discus throw	1 October
Silver	Holger Behrendt; Ralf Büchner; Ulf Hoffmann; Sylvio Kroll; Sven Tippelt; Andreas Wecker	Gymnastics	Men's artistic team all-around	20 September
Silver	Uwe Daßler; Thomas Flemming; Lars Hinneburg; Sven Lodziewski; Steffen Zesner	Swimming	Men's 4 × 200 metre freestyle relay	21 September
Silver	Udo Wagner	Fencing	Men's foil	21 September
Silver	Frank Baltrusch	Swimming	Men's 200 metre backstroke	22 September
Silver	Heike Friedrich	Swimming	Women's 400 metre freestyle	22 September
Silver	Ingo Steinhöfel	Weightlifting	Men's 75 kg	22 September
Silver	Ralf Schumann	Shooting	Men's 25 metre rapid fire pistol	23 September
Silver	Ronald Weigel	Athletics	Men's 20 kilometres walk	23 September
Silver	Birte Weigang	Swimming	Women's 100 metre butterfly	23 September
Silver	Sylvio Kroll	Gymnastics	Men's vault	24 September
Silver	Sabine John	Athletics	Women's heptathlon	24 September
Silver	Christa Rothenburger	Cycling	Women's sprint	24 September
Silver	Steffen Blochwitz; Roland Hennig; Dirk Meier; Uwe Preißler; Carsten Wolf	Cycling	Men's team pursuit	24 September
Silver	Astrid Strauß	Swimming	Women's 800 metre freestyle	24 September
Silver	Detlef Kirchhoff; René Rensch; Mario Streit	Rowing	Men's coxed pair	25 September
Silver	Dagmar Kersten	Gymnastics	Women's uneven bars	25 September
Silver	Patrick Kühl	Swimming	Men's 200 metre individual medley	25 September
Silver	Kathrin Zimmermann	Swimming	Women's 200 metre backstroke	25 September
Silver	Birte Weigang	Swimming	Women's 200 metre butterfly	25 September
Silver	Christine Wachtel	Athletics	Women's 800 metres	26 September
Silver	Petra Müller	Athletics	Women's 400 metres	26 September
Silver	Sven Loll	Judo	Men's 71 kg	27 September
Silver	Heike Drechsler	Athletics	Women's long jump	29 September
Silver	Diana Gansky	Athletics	Women's discus throw	29 September
Silver	Torsten Voss	Athletics	Men's decathlon	29 September
Silver	Andreas Stähle	Canoeing	Men's K-1 500 metres	30 September
Silver	Birgit Schmidt	Canoeing	Women's K-1 500 metres	30 September
Silver	Ronald Weigel	Athletics	Men's 50 kilometres walk	30 September
Silver	Gloria Siebert	Athletics	Women's 100 metres hurdles	30 September
Silver	Jörg Schmidt	Canoeing	Men's C-1 1000 metres	1 October
Silver	Olaf Heukrodt; Ingo Spelly	Canoeing	Men's C-2 1000 metres	1 October
Silver	Kerstin Behrendt; Marlies Göhr; Ingrid Auerswald-Lange; Silke Möller	Athletics	Women's 4 × 100 metres relay	1 October
Silver	Kathrin Neimke	Athletics	Women's shot put	1 October
Silver	Henry Stöhr	Judo	Men's +95 kg	1 October
Silver	Andreas Tews	Boxing	Flyweight	2 October
Bronze	Daniela Hunger	Swimming	Women's 400 metre individual medley	19 September
Bronze	Manuela Stellmach	Swimming	Women's 200 metre freestyle	21 September
Bronze	Gabi Fähnrich; Martina Jentsch; Dagmar Kersten; Ulrike Klotz; Bettina Schieferdecker; Dörte Thümmler	Gymnastics	Women's artistic team all-around	21 September
Bronze	Bernd Dittert	Cycling	Men's individual pursuit	22 September
Bronze	Anke Möhring	Swimming	Women's 400 metre freestyle	22 September
Bronze	Cornelia Sirch	Swimming	Women's 100 metre backstroke	22 September
Bronze	Katrin Dörre	Athletics	Women's marathon	23 September
Bronze	Thomas Flemming; Lars Hinneburg; Dirk Richter; Steffen Zesner	Swimming	Men's 4 × 100 metre freestyle relay	23 September
Bronze	Silke Hörner	Swimming	Women's 100 metre breaststroke	23 September
Bronze	Sven Tippelt	Gymnastics	Men's rings	24 September
Bronze	Sven Tippelt	Gymnastics	Men's parallel bars	24 September
Bronze	Holger Behrendt	Gymnastics	Men's horizontal bar	24 September
Bronze	Anke Behmer	Athletics	Women's heptathlon	24 September
Bronze	Steffen Bogs; Heiko Habermann; Jens Köppen; Steffen Zühlke	Rowing	Men's quadruple sculls	25 September
Bronze	Heike Drechsler	Athletics	Women's 100 metres	25 September
Bronze	Uwe Daßler	Swimming	Men's 1500 metre freestyle	25 September
Bronze	Katrin Meißner	Swimming	Women's 50 metre freestyle	25 September
Bronze	Cornelia Sirch	Swimming	Women's 200 metre backstroke	25 September
Bronze	Beate Koch	Athletics	Women's javelin throw	26 September
Bronze	Ronny Weller	Weightlifting	Men's 110 kg	27 September
Bronze	Ellen Fiedler	Athletics	Women's 400 metres hurdles	28 September
Bronze	Torsten Bréchôt	Judo	Men's 78 kg	28 September
Bronze	Heike Drechsler	Athletics	Women's 200 metres	29 September
Bronze	Hartwig Gauder	Athletics	Men's 50 kilometres walk	30 September
Bronze	André Wohllebe	Canoeing	Men's K-1 1000 metres	1 October
Bronze	Hans-Jörg Bliesener; Kay Bluhm; Andreas Stähle; André Wohllebe	Canoeing	Men's K-4 1000 metres	1 October
Bronze	Jens-Peter Herold	Athletics	Men's 1500 metres	1 October
Bronze	Hansjörg Kunze	Athletics	Men's 5000 metres	1 October
Bronze	Grit Breuer; Sabine Busch; Kirsten Emmelmann; Petra Müller; Dagmar Neubauer	Athletics	Women's 4 × 400 metres relay	1 October
Bronze	Andreas Schröder	Wrestling	Men's freestyle 130 kg	1 October

== Competitors ==
The following is the list of number of competitors in the Games.

Sport	Men	Women	Total
Athletics	25	33	58
Boxing	11	–	11
Canoeing	11	4	15
Cycling	14	3	17
Diving	2	2	4
Fencing	7	0	7
Gymnastics	6	6	12
Handball	13	0	13
Judo	4	–	4
Rowing	21	23	44
Sailing	7	2	9
Shooting	13	2	15
Swimming	11	15	26
Volleyball	0	12	12
Weightlifting	4	–	4
Wrestling	8	–	8
Total	157	102	259

== Athletics ==
=== Men's competition ===
Men's 5,000 metres

- Hansjörg Kunze
  1. Heat — 13:44.34
  2. Semifinal — 13:23.04
  3. Final — 13:15.73 (→ Bronze medal)

Men's 10,000 metres

- Hansjörg Kunze
  1. Heat — 28:22.09
  2. Final — 27:39.35 (→ 6th place)

Men's marathon

- Jörg Peter
  - Final — did not start (→ no ranking)

Men's 4 × 400 m relay

- Jens Carlowitz, Michael Schimmer, Mathias Schersing and Thomas Schönlebe
  - Heat — 3:08.13
- Jens Carlowitz, Frank Möller, Mathias Schersing and Thomas Schönlebe
  - Semifinal — 3:00.60
- Jens Carlowitz, Mathias Schersing, Frank Möller and Thomas Schönlebe
  - Final — 3:01.13 (→ 4th place)

Men's 3.000 m steeplechase

- Hagen Melzer

1. Heat — 8:36.45
2. Semifinal — 8:16.27
3. Final — 8:19.82 (→ 10th place)

Men's javelin throw

- Gerald Weiss
  - Qualification — 79.16m
  - Final — 81.30 m (→ 6th place)
- Silvio Warsönke
  - Qualification — 78.22m (→ did not advance)
- Detlef Michel
  - Qualification — 77.70 m (→ did not advance)

Men's discus throw

- Jürgen Schult
  - Qualifying heat – 64.70 m
  - Final – 68.82m (→ Gold medal)

Men's shot put

- Ulf Timmermann
  - Qualifying heat – 21.27m
  - Final – 22.47m (→ Gold medal)
- Udo Beyer
  - Qualifying heat – 20.97m
  - Final – 21.40 m (→ 4th place)

Men's hammer throw

- Ralf Haber
  - Qualifying heat — 78.16m
  - Final — 80.44m (→ 4th place)
- Günther Rodehau
  - Qualifying heat — 78.12m
  - Final — 72.36m (→ 12th place)

Men's decathlon

- Christian Schenk — 8488 points (→ Gold medal))

1. 100 metres — 11.25s
2. Long jump — 7.43m
3. Shot put — 15.48m
4. High jump — 2.27m
5. 400 metres — 48.90 s
6. 110 m hurdles — 15.13s
7. Discus throw — 49.28m
8. Pole vault — 4.70 m
9. Javelin throw — 61.32m
10. 1.500 metres — 4:28.95s

- Torsten Voss — 8399 points (→ Silver medal))

1. 100 metres — 10.87s
2. Long jump — 7.45m
3. Shot put — 14.97m
4. High jump — 1.97m
5. 400 metres — 47.71s
6. 110 m hurdles — 14.46s
7. Discus throw — 44.36m
8. Pole vault — 5.10 m
9. Javelin throw — 61.76m
10. 1.500 metres — 4:33.02s

- Uwe Freimuth — 7860 points (→ 18th place)

1. 100 metres — 11.57s
2. Long jump — 7.00 m
3. Shot put — 15.60 m
4. High jump — 1.94m
5. 400 metres — 49.84s
6. 110 m hurdles — 15.04s
7. Discus throw — 46.66m
8. Pole vault — 4.90 m
9. Javelin throw — 60.20 m
10. 1.500 metres — 4:46.04s

Men's 20 km walk

- Ronald Weigel
  - Final — 1:20:00 (→ Silver medal)
- Axel Noack
  - Final — 1:21:14 (→ 8th place)

Men's 50 km walk

- Ronald Weigel
  - Final — 3'38:56 (→ Silver medal)
- Hartwig Gauder
  - Final — 3'39:45 (→ Bronze medal)
- Dietmar Meisch
  - Final — 3'46:31 (→ 9th place)

=== Women's competition ===
Women's 4 × 100 m relay

- Silke Möller, Kerstin Behrendt, Ingrid Lange and Marlies Göhr
  - Heat — 42.92
  - Semifinal — 42.23
  - Final — 42.09 (→ Silver medal)

Women's 4 × 400 m relay

- Grit Breuer, Dagmar Neubauer-Rübsam, Kirsten Emmelmann and Petra Müller
  - Heat — 3:27.37
- Dagmar Neubauer-Rübsam, Kirsten Emmelmann, Sabine Busch and Petra Müller
  - Final — 3:18.29 (→ Bronze medal)

Women's marathon

- Katrin Dörre – 2"26:21 (→ Bronze medal)
- Birgit Stephan – did not finish (→ no ranking)

Women's discus throw

- Martina Hellmann
  - Qualification – 67.12m
  - Final – 72.30 m (→ Gold medal)
- Diana Gansky
  - Qualification – 65.40 m
  - Final – 71.88m (→ Silver medal)
- Gabriele Reinsch
  - Qualification – 66.88m
  - Final – 67.26m (→ 7th place)

Women's javelin throw

- Petra Felke
  - Qualification – 67.06m
  - Final – 74.68m (→ Gold medal)
- Beate Koch
  - Qualification – 66.86m
  - Final – 67.30 m (→ Bronze medal)
- Silke Renk
  - Qualification – 63.64m
  - Final – 66.38m (→ 5th place)

Women's shot put

- Kathrin Neimke
  - Qualification – 20.18m
  - Final – 21.07m (→ Silver medal)
- Ines Müller
  - Qualification – 19.79m
  - Final – 20.37m (→ 4th place)
- Heike Hartwig
  - Qualification – 20.06m
  - Final – 20.20 m (→ 6th place)

Women's heptathlon

- Sabine John
  - Final result — 6897 points (→ Silver medal)
- Anke Behmer
  - Final result — 6858 points (→ Bronze medal)
- Ines Schulz
  - Final result — 6411 points (→ 6th place)

== Boxing ==
Men's bantamweight (54 kg)

- René Breitbarth
  1. First round — defeated Magare Tshekiso (BTS), 5–0
  2. Second round — defeated Vedat Tutuk (TUR), 5–0
  3. Third round — lost to Jorge Julio Rocha (COL), 1–4

== Cycling ==
Seventeen cyclists, fourteen men and three women, represented East Germany in 1988.

Men's road race

- Olaf Ludwig — 4:32:22 (→ Gold medal)
- Uwe Raab
- Uwe Ampler

Men's team time trial

- Uwe Ampler
- Mario Kummer
- Maik Landsmann
- Jan Schur

Men's sprint

- Lutz Heßlich

Men's 1 km time trial

- Maic Malchow

Men's individual pursuit

- Bernd Dittert

Men's team pursuit

- Steffen Blochwitz
- Roland Hennig
- Carsten Wolf
- Dirk Meier
- Uwe Preißler

Men's points race

- Olaf Ludwig

Women's road race

- Angela Ranft — 2:00:52 (→ 25th place)
- Petra Rossner — DNF (→ no ranking)

Women's sprint

- Christa Rothenburger-Luding

== Diving ==
Men

Athlete	Event	Preliminary		Final	
Athlete	Event	Points	Rank	Points	Rank
Jan Hempel	10 m platform	558.03	5 Q	583.77	5
Steffen Haage	10 m platform	529.68	8 Q	541.02	7

Women

Athlete	Event	Preliminary		Final	
Athlete	Event	Points	Rank	Points	Rank
Brita Baldus	3 m springboard	464.01	6 Q	479.19	7
Silke Abicht	10 m platform	393.99	7 Q	350.61	8

== Fencing ==
Seven fencers, all men, represented East Germany in 1988. Udo Wagner won a silver medal in the individual foil event.

Men's foil

- Udo Wagner
- Jens Howe
- Aris Enkelmann

Men's team foil

- Aris Enkelmann, Adrian Germanus, Jens Gusek, Jens Howe, Udo Wagner

Men's épée

- Torsten Kühnemund
- Uwe Proske

== Shooting ==
Men:

- 10 metre air pistol - Gernot Eder (9th place); Jens Potteck (10th place)
- 25 metre rapid fire pistol - Ralf Schumann (2nd place) Silver medal

Roland Müller (=18th place)

- 50 metre pistol - Gernot Eder (5th place); Uwe Potteck (9th place)
- 10 metre air rifle - Andreas Wolfram (8th place)
- 50 metre rifle three positions - Andreas Wolfram (10th place); Olaf Heß otherwise Olaf Hess (=18th place)
- 50 metre rifle prone - Olaf Heß otherwise Olaf Hess (=15th place); Andreas Wolfram (=15th place)
- 50 metre running target - Thomas Pfeffer (7th place); Mike Herrmann (=15th place)

Open:

- Trap - Jörg Damme (=15th place)
- Skeet - Axel Wegner - (1st place) Gold medal

Jürgen Raabe (6th place); Bernhard Hochwald (=11th place)

Women:

- 10 metre air pistol - Anke Völker (5th place)
- 25 metre pistol - Anke Völker (=24th place)
- 10 metre air rifle - Katja Klepp (37th place)
- 50 metre rifle three positions - Katja Klepp (4th place)

== Swimming ==
Men's 100 m freestyle

- Steffen Zesner
  1. Heat – 50.73
  2. Final – scratched (→ did not advance, no ranking)
- Sven Lodziewski
  1. Heat – 50.77
  2. B-Final – 51.00 (→ 12th place)

Men's 200 m freestyle

- Steffen Zesner
  1. Heat – 1:49.13
  2. Final – 1:48.77 (→ 6th place)
- Thomas Flemming
  1. Heat – 1:49.52
  2. B-Final – 1:50.18 (→ 10th place)

Men's 400 m freestyle

- Uwe Dassler
  1. Heat – 3:49.90
  2. Final – 3:46.95 (→ Gold medal)
- Jörg Hoffmann
  1. Heat – 3:53.78
  2. B-Final – 3:52.13 (→ 9th place)

Men's 1500 m freestyle

- Uwe Dassler
  1. Heat – 15:08.91
  2. Final – 15:06.15 (→ Bronze medal)
- Jörg Hoffmann
  1. Heat – 15:14.13 (→ did not advance, 6th place)

Men's 100 m backstroke

- Frank Baltrusch
  1. Heat – 56.45
  2. Final – 56.10 (→ 6th place)
- Dirk Richter
  1. Heat – 56.52
  2. B-Final – 56.66 (→ 9th place)

Men's 200 m backstroke

- Frank Baltrusch
  1. Heat – 2:01.49
  2. Final – 1:59.60 (→ Silver medal)
- Dirk Richter
  1. Heat – 2:01.54
  2. Final – 2:01.67 (→ 5th place)

Men's 100 m breaststroke

- Christian Poswiat
  1. Heat – 1:02.99
  2. Final – 1:03.43 (→ 8th place)
- Raik Hannemann
  1. Heat – 1:04.46 (→ did not advance, 20th place)

Men's 200 m breaststroke

- Christian Poswiat
  1. Heat – 2:20.99 (→ did not advance, 27th place)

Men's 200 m individual medley

- Patrick Kühl
  1. Heat – 2:03.77
  2. Final – 2:01.61 (→ Silver medal)
- Raik Hannemann
  1. Heat – 2:04.03
  2. Final – 2:04.82 (→ 7th place)

Men's 400 m individual medley

- Patrick Kühl
  1. Heat – 4:18.60
  2. Final – 4:18.44 (→ 5th place)
- Raik Hannemann
  1. Heat – 2:04.03
  2. Final – 2:04.82 (→ 7th place)

Men's 4 × 100 m freestyle relay

- Dirk Richter, Thomas Flemming, Lars Hinneburg and Steffen Zesner
  1. Heat – 3:20.47
  2. Final – 3:19.82 (→ Bronze medal)

Men's 4 × 200 m freestyle relay

- Uwe Dassler, Lars Hinneburg, Sven Lodziewski and Thomas Flemming
  1. Heat – 7:16.61
- Uwe Dassler, Sven Lodziewski, Thomas Flemming and Steffen Zesner
  1. Final – 7:13.68 (→ Silver medal)

Women's 50 m freestyle

- Kristin Otto
  1. Heat – 25.85
  2. B-Final – 25.49 (→ Gold medal)
- Katrin Meissner
  1. Heat – 25.77
  2. Final – 25.71 (→ Bronze medal)

Women's 100 m freestyle

- Kristin Otto
  1. Heat – 55.80
  2. B-Final – 54.93 (→ Gold medal)
- Manuela Stellmach
  1. Heat – 56.14
  2. Final – 55.52 (→ 4th place)

Women's 200 m freestyle

- Heike Friedrich
  1. Heat – 1:59.02
  2. B-Final – 1:57.65 (→ Gold medal)
- Manuela Stellmach
  1. Heat – 2:00.30
  2. Final – 1:59.01 (→ (gold) Bronze medal)

Women's 400 m freestyle

- Heike Friedrich
  1. Heat – 4:11.30
  2. B-Final – 4:05.94 (→ Silver medal)
- Anke Möhring
  1. Heat – 4:10.64
  2. Final – 4:06.62 (→ Bronze medal)

Women's 800 m freestyle

- Astrid Strauss
  1. Heat – 8:28.07
  2. B-Final – 8:22.09 (→ Silver medal)
- Anke Möhring
  1. Heat – 8:30.95
  2. Final – 8:23.09 (→ 4th place)

Women's 100 m backstroke

- Kristin Otto
  1. Heat – 1:01.45
  2. Final – 1:00.89 (→ Gold medal)
- Cornelia Sirch
  1. Heat – 1:01.63
  2. Final – 1:01.57 (→ Bronze medal)

Women's 200 m backstroke

- Kathrin Zimmermann
  1. Heat – 2:12.81
  2. Final – 2:10.61 (→ Silver medal)
- Cornelia Sirch
  1. Heat – 2:10.46
  2. Final – 2:11.45 (→ Bronze medal)

Women's 100 m breaststroke

- Silke Hörner
  1. Heat – 1:08.35
  2. Final – 1:08.83 (→ Bronze medal)
- Annett Rex
  1. Heat – 1:10.61
  2. Final – 1:10.67 (→ 8th place)

Women's 200 m breaststroke

- Silke Hörner
  1. Heat – 2:27.63
  2. Final – 2:26.71 (→ Gold medal)
- Susanne Boernike
  1. Heat – 2:30.71
  2. B-Final – 2:28.55 (→ 9th place)

Women's 100 m butterfly

- Kristin Otto
  1. Heat – 1:00.40
  2. Final – 59.00 (→ Gold medal)
- Birte Weigang
  1. Heat – 59.97
  2. Final – 59.45 (→ Silver medal)

Women's 200 m butterfly

- Kathleen Nord
  1. Heat – 2:11.81
  2. Final – 2:09.51 (→ Gold medal)
- Birte Weigang
  1. Heat – 2:11.97
  2. Final – 2:09.91 (→ Silver medal)

Women's 200 m individual medley

- Daniela Hunger
  1. Heat – 2:16.23
  2. Final – 2:12.59 (→ Gold medal)

Women's 400 m individual medley

- Daniela Hunger
  1. Heat – 4:44.85
  2. Final – 4:39.76 (→ Bronze medal)
- Kathleen Nord
  1. Heat – 4:42.92
  2. Final – 4:41.64 (→ 5th place)

Women's 4 × 100 m freestyle relay

- Katrin Meissner, Sabina Schulze, Heike Friedrich and Daniela Hunger
  1. Heat – 3:43.13
- Kristin Otto, Katrin Meissner, Daniela Hunger and Manuela Stellmach
  1. Final – 3:40.63 (→ Gold medal)

Women's 4 × 100 m medley relay

- Cornelia Sirch, Silke Hörner, Birte Weigang and Manuela Stellmach
  1. Heat – 4:08.53
- Kristin Otto, Silke Hörner, Birte Weigang and Katrin Meissner
  1. Final – 4:03.74 (→ Gold medal)

== Volleyball ==
=== Women's tournament ===
- Preliminary round (Group A)
  - Lost to South Korea (1–3)
  - Defeated Japan (3–2)
  - Lost to Soviet Union (0–3)
- Classification matches
  - 5th/8th place: defeated United States (3–1)
  - 5th/6th place: defeated Brazil (3–0) → Fifth place
- Team roster
  - Steffi Schmidt
  - Susanne Lahme
  - Monika Beu
  - Ariane Radfan
  - Kathrin Langschwager
  - Maike Arlt
  - Brit Wiedemann
  - Ute Steppin
  - Grit Jensen
  - Dörte Stüdemann
  - Heike Jensen
  - Ute Langenau
- Head coach: Siegfried Köhler
