= Ute Steppin =

German volleyball player (born 1965)

Personal information
- Nationality: East Germany / Germany
- Born: 31 May 1965 (age 61) Crivitz, Bezirk Schwerin, East Germany
- Height: 1.90 m (6 ft 3 in)

Volleyball information
- Number: 8 (national team)

Career
- Years: Team
- 1994: Schweriner SC

National team
- Years: Team
- 1983—1990 1991—1996: East Germany; Germany
Honours
Women's volleyball
Representing East Germany
Friendship Games
Bronze medal – third place	1984 Varna	Team
European Championship
Gold medal – first place	1983 East Germany	Team
Gold medal – first place	1987 Belgium	Team
Silver medal – second place	1985 Netherlands	Team
Silver medal – second place	1989 West Germany	Team
Representing Germany
European Championship
Bronze medal – third place	1991 Italy	Team

Ute Steppin (born 31 May 1965) was a German female volleyball player.

She was part of the East Germany women's national volleyball team at the 1988 Summer Olympics, and of the Germany women's national volleyball team at the 1996 Summer Olympics. She participated in the 1994 FIVB Volleyball Women's World Championship. On club level she played with Schweriner SC.

== Clubs ==
- Schweriner SC (1994)
