= Heike Lehmann =

East German volleyball player

Personal information
- Full name: Heike Lehmann (-Grund, -Weber)
- Born: 29 March 1962 (age 64); Neustrelitz, East Germany
- Height: 179 cm (5 ft 10 in)

Volleyball information
- Number: 5

National team
1980–1985	East Germany
Honours
Women's volleyball
Representing East Germany
Olympic Games
Silver medal – second place	1980 Moscow	Team
Friendship Games
Bronze medal – third place	1984 Varna
European Championship
Gold medal – first place	1983 East Germany
Silver medal – second place	1985 Netherlands

Heike Lehmann (later Grund, now Weber, born 29 March 1962) is a female German former volleyball player who competed for East Germany in the 1980 Summer Olympics in Moscow.

Lehmann was born in Neustrelitz. In 1980, she was part of the East German team that won the silver medal in the Olympic tournament. She played all five matches.
