= Susanne Lahme =

German volleyball player

Personal information
- Born: 10 September 1968 (age 58); Luckenwalde, East Germany
- Height: 1.86 m (6 ft 1 in)
- Weight: 77 kg (170 lb)

Volleyball information
- Position: Middle blocker
- Number: 2 (1988); 1 (1996–2000)
Honours
Indoor volleyball
Representing East Germany
European Championship
Gold medal – first place	1987 Belgium	Team
Silver medal – second place	1985 Netherlands	Team
Silver medal – second place	1989 West Germany	Team
Representing Germany
European Championship
Bronze medal – third place	1991 Italy	Team

Susanne Lahme (born 10 September 1968) is a former German indoor and beach volleyball player who is best known for her time at SC Dynamo Berlin throughout the 1980s.

== Indoor volleyball career ==
Lahme began her career in the indoor volleyball in 1980 playing at SC Dynamo Berlin, and was eight times East German and unified German champion and nine-time German Cup winner. With the East Germany national team she was the 1987 European champion and two-time European Championship runner-up (1985 and 1989). In 1991, she was third at the European Championships with the already unified German national team. In 1992 and 1993, she was selected as the German Volleyball Player of the Year.

Lahme took part in three editions of the Olympic Games in 1988 (with East Germany), 1996 and 2000, and reached the fifth (Seoul), eighth (Atlanta), and sixth place (Sydney), respectively.

Lahme finished in fifth-place at the 1994 World Championships in São Paulo, Brazil. Her successful indoor career was ended after the 2002–03 season in Italy. At club level, she played in Italy and Brazil as well as Germany.

In 1995, Lahme won the European CEV Cup playing with the Italian team Ecoclear Sumirago Varese. In 1996, she won the Champions League in Wien against Uralochka Ekateninburg playing with the team PVF Latte Rugiada Parmalat Matera. With the team Foppapedretti Bergamo she won the Italian Supercup in 1997 and the Italian Cup in 1998. She also won the Cup Winners' Cup with the team Despar Perugia in 2000.

== Beach volleyball career ==
In 2001, Lahme started a beach volleyball parallel career. As of 2002, she formed a duo with Danja Müsch and started at the FIVB Beach Volleyball World Tour. In 2004, they played at the Athens Summer Olympics, which she finished in ninth place after losing in the Round of 16 to Daniela Gattelli and Lucilla Perrotta, from Italy.

After a knee surgery in August 2007, she finished her career as an athlete and trained and supervised in 2008 their compatriots Geeske Banck (her 2006–07 partner) and Anja Günther.

Awards
Preceded by Ines Pianka	German Volleyball Player of the Year; 1992, 1993	Succeeded by Grit Naumann
