= Grit Naumann =

German volleyball player (born 1966)

Personal information
- Full name: Grit Jensen-Naumann (-Böhnke)
- Born: 13 July 1966 (age 60); Dresden, Saxony, East Germany
- Height: 185 cm (6 ft 1 in)

Volleyball information
- Position: Middle blocker
- Number: 17 (national team)

Career
Years	Teams
1994	CJD Berlino

National team
1983–1989; 1994–1996	East Germany; Germany
Honours
Women's volleyball
Representing East Germany
Friendship Games
Bronze medal – third place	1984 Varna
European Championship
Gold medal – first place	1983 East Germany
Gold medal – first place	1987 Belgium
Silver medal – second place	1985 Netherlands
Silver medal – second place	1989 West Germany

Grit Naumann (born 13 July 1966) is a German retired volleyball player. She was part of the East Germany women's national volleyball team at the 1988 Summer Olympics in Seoul (her elder sister Heike was also a member of that squad), and the Germany women's national volleyball team at the 1996 Summer Olympics in Atlanta.

She participated in the 1994 FIVB World Championship. On club level she played with CJD Berlino.

In 1994, Naumann was selected as the German Volleyball Player of the Year.

== Clubs ==
- CJD Berlino (1994)

Awards
Preceded by Susanne Lahme	German Volleyball Player of the Year; 1994	Succeeded by Ines Pianka
