= Andrea Heim =

East German volleyball player (born 1961)

Personal information
- Born: 11 February 1961 (age 65); Bergen auf Rügen, East Germany (now Germany)
- Height: 175 cm (5 ft 9 in)

Volleyball information
- Number: 2 (national team)

National team
1977–1984	East Germany
Honours
Women's volleyball
Representing East Germany
Olympic Games
Silver medal – second place	1980 Moscow	Team
Friendship Games
Bronze medal – third place	1984 Varna
European Championship
Gold medal – first place	1983 East Germany

Andrea Heim (later Markus, born 11 February 1961) is a German female former volleyball player who competed for East Germany in the 1980 Summer Olympics in Moscow.

Heim was born in Bergen auf Rügen.

In 1980, Heim was part of the East German team that won the silver medal in the Olympic tournament. She played two matches.
