= Yelena Volkova (volleyball) =

Soviet volleyball player (born 1960)

Personal information
- Full name: Yelena Pavlovna Volkova
- Nickname: Елена Павловна Волкова
- Born: 13 June 1960 (age 66) Sverdlovsk, Russian SFSR, Soviet Union
- Height: 1.90 m (6 ft 3 in)

Volleyball information
- Position: Opposite
- Number: 3

National team
- Years: Team
- 1981–1988: Soviet Union
Honours
Women's volleyball
Representing the Soviet Union
Olympic Games
Gold medal – first place	1988 Seoul	Team
FIVB World Cup
Bronze medal – third place	1981 Japan
Bronze medal – third place	1985 Japan
Goodwill Games
Gold medal – first place	1986 Moscow
Friendship Games
Silver medal – second place	1984 Varna
European Championships
Gold medal – first place	1985 Arnhem
Silver medal – second place	1981 Sofia
Silver medal – second place	1983 Rostock
Silver medal – second place	1987 Ghent

Yelena Pavlovna Volkova (Russian: Елена Павловна Волкова, born 13 June 1960) is a former Soviet competitive volleyball player and Olympic gold medalist. She won a gold medal at the 1988 Summer Olympics in Seoul.
