= Maike Arlt =

German volleyball player (born 1963)

Personal information
- Born: 24 September 1963 (age 63); Meissen, Bezirk Dresden, East Germany (now Germany)
- Height: 174 cm (5 ft 9 in)

Volleyball information
- Position: Outside hitter
- Number: 6 (East Germany)

National team
1983–1988; 1991	East Germany; Germany
Honours
Women's volleyball
Representing East Germany
Friendship Games
Bronze medal – third place	1984 Varna
European Championship
Gold medal – first place	1983 East Germany
Gold medal – first place	1987 Belgium
Silver medal – second place	1985 Netherlands
Representing Germany
European Championship
Bronze medal – third place	1991 Italy

Maike Arlt (born 24 September 1963) is a German former volleyball player. She competed in the women's tournament at the 1988 Summer Olympics in Seoul.
