= 1987 Women's European Volleyball Championship =

Tournament details
- Host country: Belgium
- Dates: 25 September – 3 October
- Teams: 12
- Venue: Various (in 3 host cities)

Final positions
- Champions: East Germany (2nd title)

Tournament awards
- MVP: (Czechoslovakia) Lucie Václavíková

The 1987 Women's European Volleyball Championship was the fifteenth edition of the event, organised by Europe's governing volleyball body, the Confédération Européenne de Volleyball. It was hosted in several cities in Belgium from 25 September to 3 October 1987, with the final round held in Ghent.

== Participating teams ==
- Belgium
- Bulgaria
- Czechoslovakia
- East Germany
- France
- Hungary
- Italy
- Netherlands
- Poland
- Romania
- Soviet Union
- West Germany

== Format ==
The tournament was played in two different stages. In the first stage, the twelve participants were divided in two groups of six teams each. A single round-robin format was played within each group to determine the teams' group position. The second stage of the tournament consisted of three sets of semifinals to determine the tournament final ranking. The group stage firsts and seconds played the semifinals for 1st to 4th place, group stage thirds and fourths played the 5th to 8th place semifinals and group stage fifths and sixths played the 9th to 12th semifinals. The pairing of the semifinals was made so teams played against the opposite group teams which finished in a different position (1st played against 2nd, 3rd played against 4th and 5th played against 6th).

== Pools composition ==
Pool A	Pool B
Czechoslovakia	Belgium
Italy	Bulgaria
Netherlands	East Germany
Poland	France
Soviet Union	Hungary
West Germany	Romania

== Venues ==
Pool A	Pool B and Final round (1st–4th)	Final round (5th–12th)	Tournament host cities
Eupen	Ghent	Auderghem	Tournament host cities

== Preliminary round ==
=== Pool A ===
- venue location: Eupen, Belgium

Pos	Team	Pld	W	L	Pts	SW	SL	SR	SPW	SPL	SPR	Qualification
1	Soviet Union	5	5	0	10	15	2	7.500	249	103	2.417	Semifinals
2	Czechoslovakia	5	3	2	8	10	8	1.250	215	205	1.049	Semifinals
3	Netherlands	5	3	2	8	11	10	1.100	245	259	0.946	5th–8th place
4	Italy	5	2	3	7	8	11	0.727	209	234	0.893	5th–8th place
5	West Germany	5	1	4	6	8	12	0.667	222	265	0.838	9th–12th place
6	Poland	5	1	4	6	4	13	0.308	164	238	0.689	9th–12th place

Date		Score		Set 1	Set 2	Set 3	Set 4	Set 5	Total	Report
25 Sep	Soviet Union	3–1	Czechoslovakia	15–13	11–15	15–1	15–2		56–31	Report
25 Sep	Netherlands	3–1	Poland	14–16	15–11	15–11	15–7		59–45	Report
25 Sep	Italy	3–2	West Germany	15–7	12–15	9–15	15–7	15–12	66–56	Report
26 Sep	Czechoslovakia	3–1	Netherlands	15–11	12–15	15–10	15–1		57–37	Report
26 Sep	Soviet Union	3–0	West Germany	15–7	15–3	15–6			45–16	Report
26 Sep	Poland	3–1	Italy	7–15	15–13	15–9	15–7		52–44	Report
27 Sep	Czechoslovakia	3–1	West Germany	15–11	14–16	15–10	15–9		59–46	Report
27 Sep	Netherlands	3–1	Italy	15–4	15–12	13–15	15–9		58–40	Report
27 Sep	Soviet Union	3–0	Poland	15–3	15–2	15–6			45–11	Report
29 Sep	Soviet Union	3–0	Italy	15–9	15–4	15–1			45–14	Report
29 Sep	Czechoslovakia	3–0	Poland	15–3	15–13	15–5			45–21	Report
29 Sep	Netherlands	3–2	West Germany	8–15	7–15	15–13	15–5	15–11	60–59	Report
30 Sep	Italy	3–0	Czechoslovakia	15–11	15–8	15–4			45–23	Report
30 Sep	West Germany	3–0	Poland	15–13	15–13	15–9			45–35	Report
30 Sep	Soviet Union	3–1	Netherlands	15–10	15–4	13–15	15–2		58–31	Report

=== Pool B ===
- venue location: Ghent, Belgium

Pos	Team	Pld	W	L	Pts	SW	SL	SR	SPW	SPL	SPR	Qualification
1	East Germany	5	5	0	10	15	0	MAX	226	108	2.093	Semifinals
2	Bulgaria	5	4	1	9	12	3	4.000	214	142	1.507	Semifinals
3	France	5	3	2	8	9	8	1.125	200	196	1.020	5th–8th place
4	Romania	5	2	3	7	6	10	0.600	170	196	0.867	5th–8th place
5	Hungary	5	1	4	6	6	12	0.500	200	237	0.844	9th–12th place
6	Belgium	5	0	5	5	0	15	0.000	94	225	0.418	9th–12th place

Date		Score		Set 1	Set 2	Set 3	Set 4	Set 5	Total	Report
25 Sep	East Germany	3–0	Bulgaria	15–11	16–14	15–9			46–34	Report
25 Sep	Romania	3–0	Belgium	15–9	15–3	15–9			45–21	Report
25 Sep	France	3–2	Hungary	15–12	15–10	15–17	11–15	15–12	71–66	Report
26 Sep	Bulgaria	3–0	Romania	15–7	15–11	15–7			45–25	Report
26 Sep	Hungary	3–0	Belgium	15–7	15–13	15–3			45–23	Report
26 Sep	East Germany	3–0	France	15–1	15–8	15–8			45–17	Report
27 Sep	Bulgaria	3–0	Belgium	15–11	15–2	15–7			45–20	Report
27 Sep	France	3–0	Romania	15–12	15–6	15–8			45–26	Report
27 Sep	East Germany	3–0	Hungary	15–8	15–6	15–6			45–20	Report
29 Sep	Bulgaria	3–0	Hungary	15–7	15–9	15–13			45–29	Report
29 Sep	East Germany	3–0	Romania	15–2	15–9	15–10			45–21	Report
29 Sep	France	3–0	Belgium	15–2	15–6	15–6			45–14	Report
30 Sep	Romania	3–1	Hungary	15–10	15–10	8–15	15–5		53–40	Report
30 Sep	East Germany	3–0	Belgium	15–4	15–6	15–6			45–16	Report
30 Sep	Bulgaria	3–0	France	15–9	15–3	15–10			45–22	Report

== Final round ==
=== 9th–12th place ===
- Pools A and B fifth and sixth positions play each other.
- venue location: Auderghem, Belgium

Semifinals
2 Oct
Hungary	3
Poland	0
2 Oct
West Germany	3
Belgium	0

9th place
3 Oct
Hungary	1
West Germany	3
11th place
3 Oct
Poland	3
Belgium	0

==== 9th–12th semifinals ====
Date		Score		Set 1	Set 2	Set 3	Set 4	Set 5	Total	Report
2 Oct	West Germany	3–0	Belgium	15–9	15–5	15–8			45–22	Report
2 Oct	Hungary	3–0	Poland	15–10	15–6	15–10			45–26	Report

==== 11th place match ====
Date		Score		Set 1	Set 2	Set 3	Set 4	Set 5	Total	Report
3 Oct	Poland	3–0	Belgium	15–6	15–9	15–11			45–26	Report

==== 9th place match ====
Date		Score		Set 1	Set 2	Set 3	Set 4	Set 5	Total	Report
3 Oct	West Germany	3–1	Hungary	15–4	15–9	13–15	15–10		58–38	Report

=== 5th–8th place ===
- Pools A and B third and fourth positions play each other.
- venue location: Auderghem, Belgium

Semifinals
2 Oct
Netherlands	3
Romania	2
2 Oct
Italy	3
France	0

5th place
3 Oct
Netherlands	3
Italy	1
7th place
3 Oct
Romania	2
France	3

==== 5th–8th semifinals ====
Date		Score		Set 1	Set 2	Set 3	Set 4	Set 5	Total	Report
2 Oct	Italy	3–0	France	15–10	15–13	15–6			45–29	Report
2 Oct	Netherlands	3–2	Romania	15–5	10–15	11–15	15–13	15–9	66–57	Report

==== 7th place match ====
Date		Score		Set 1	Set 2	Set 3	Set 4	Set 5	Total	Report
3 Oct	France	3–2	Romania	15–12	15–17	15–10	11–15	15–12	71–66	Report

==== 5th place match ====
Date		Score		Set 1	Set 2	Set 3	Set 4	Set 5	Total	Report
3 Oct	Netherlands	3–1	Italy	15–5	15–12	12–15	15–13		57–45	Report

=== Final ===
- Pools A and B first and second positions play each other.
- venue location: Ghent, Belgium

Semifinals
2 Oct
Soviet Union	3
Bulgaria	0
2 Oct
East Germany	3
Czechoslovakia	0

Final
3 Oct
Soviet Union	2
East Germany	3
3rd place
3 Oct
Bulgaria	0
Czechoslovakia	3

==== Semifinals ====
Date		Score		Set 1	Set 2	Set 3	Set 4	Set 5	Total	Report
2 Oct	East Germany	3–0	Czechoslovakia	15–9	15–13	15–2			45–24	Report
2 Oct	Soviet Union	3–0	Bulgaria	15–9	15–6	15–10			45–25	Report

==== 3rd place match ====
Date		Score		Set 1	Set 2	Set 3	Set 4	Set 5	Total	Report
3 Oct	Czechoslovakia	3–0	Bulgaria	15–10	15–10	15–12			45–32	Report

==== Final ====
Date		Score		Set 1	Set 2	Set 3	Set 4	Set 5	Total	Report
3 Oct	East Germany	3–2	Soviet Union	8–15	15–9	18–20	15–9	15–11	71–64	Report

== Final ranking ==
Place	Team
1st place, gold medalist(s)	East Germany
2nd place, silver medalist(s)	Soviet Union
3rd place, bronze medalist(s)	Czechoslovakia
4.	Bulgaria
5.	Netherlands
6.	Italy
7.	France
8.	Romania
9.	West Germany
10.	Hungary
11.	Poland
12.	Belgium

Qualified for the 1988 Olympic Games

1987 Women's European champions

East Germany
Second title

Team Roster
Ariane Radfan, Maike Arlt, Monika Beu, Grit Naumann, Anke Lindemann, Dorte Studemann, Ute Oldenburg, Susanne Lahme, Kathrin Langschwager, Heike Jensen, Steffi Schmidt and Katlin Bonat.
Head coach: Siegfried Köhler.

== Individual awards ==
- MVP: Lucie Václavíková (CSK)
- Best spiker: Elena Volkova (URS)
- Best setter: Dorte Studemann (GDR)
