= Wojciech Drzyzga =

Polish volleyball player and coach

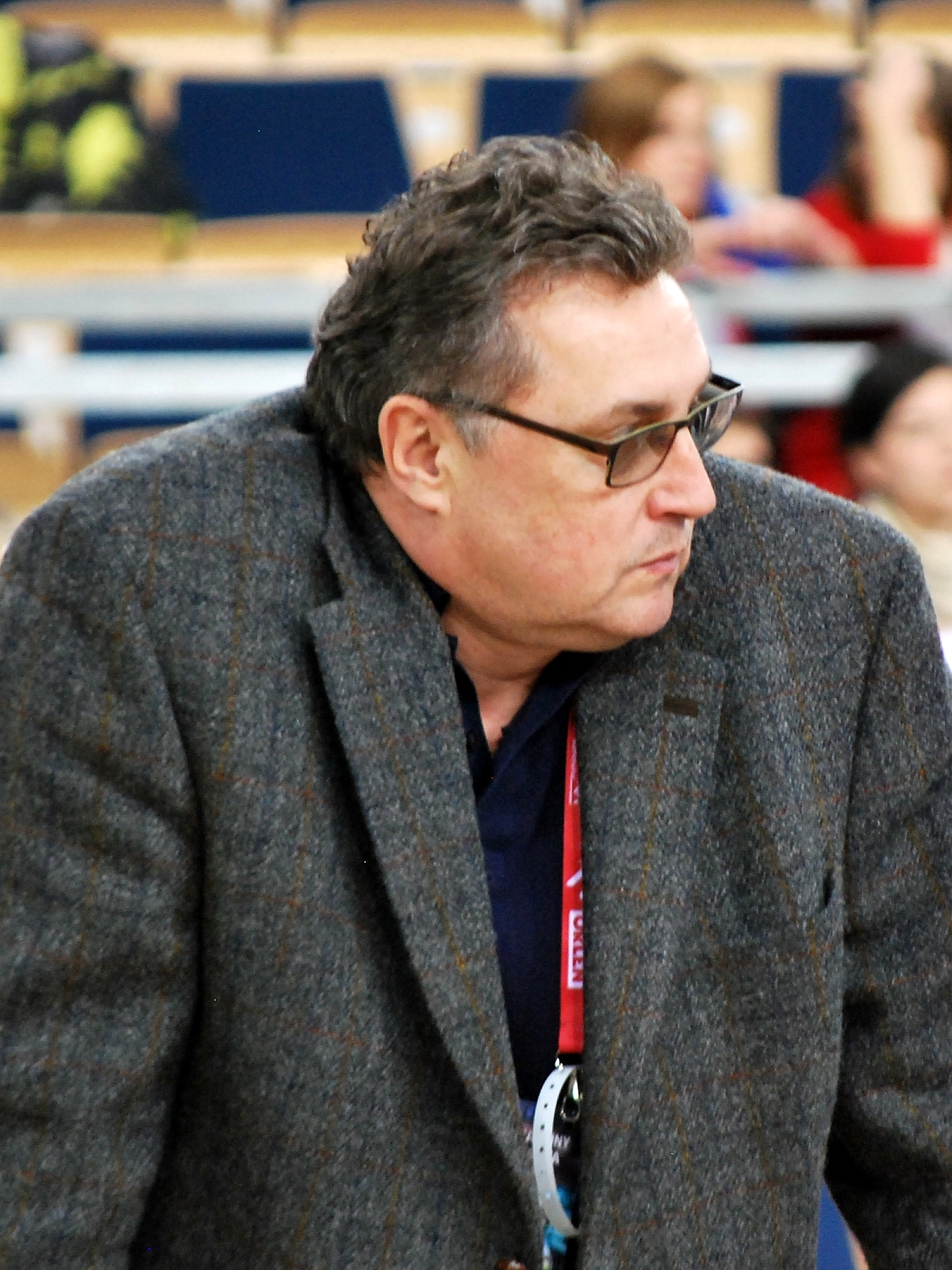

Personal information
- Born: 7 October 1958 (age 68) Warsaw, Poland
- Height: 1.95 m (6 ft 5 in)

Coaching information
- Previous teams coached
- Years: Teams
- 1992–1997 2000–2002 2000–2001 2002–2003 2005–2006: Legia Warsaw; Czarni Radom; Poland (AC); AZS Olsztyn; Mostostal Azoty Kędzierzyn-Koźle

Volleyball information

Career
- Years: Team
- 1977–1986 1986–1987 1987–1992: Legia Warsaw; Filament Bursa; JSA Bordeaux

National team
- Years: Team
- 1978–1985: Poland (291)
Honours
Men's volleyball
Representing Poland
CEV European Championship
Silver medal – second place	1979 France
Silver medal – second place	1981 Bulgaria
Silver medal – second place	1983 Germany
Friendship Games
Bronze medal – third place	1984 Havana

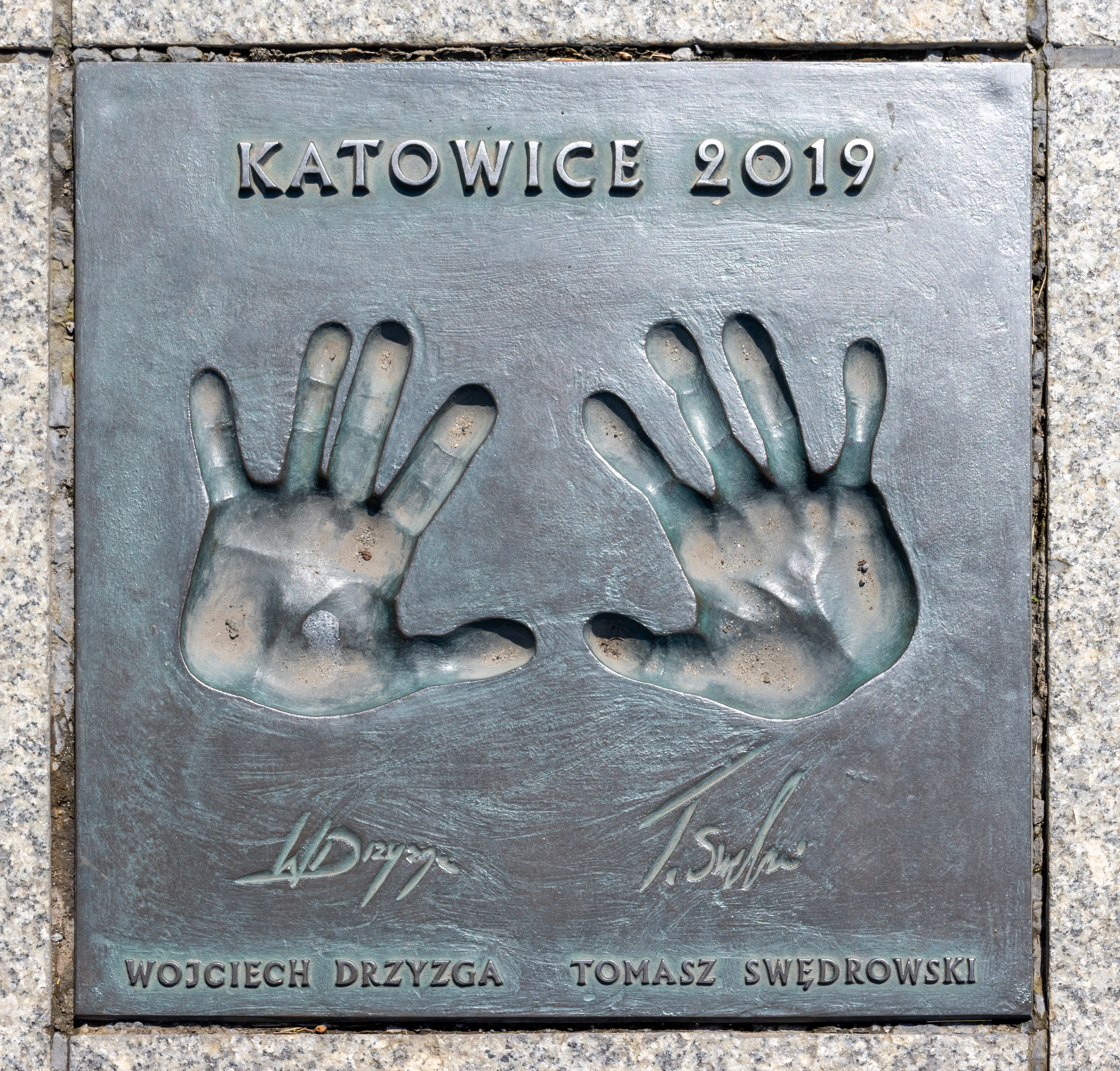
Hand prints and signature at the Avenue of Volleyball Stars, Katowice

Wojciech Drzyzga (born 7 October 1958) is a Polish former volleyball player and coach. He was a member of the Poland national team from 1978 to 1985 and a participant in the 1980 Olympic Games. Drzyzga works as a volleyball commentator.

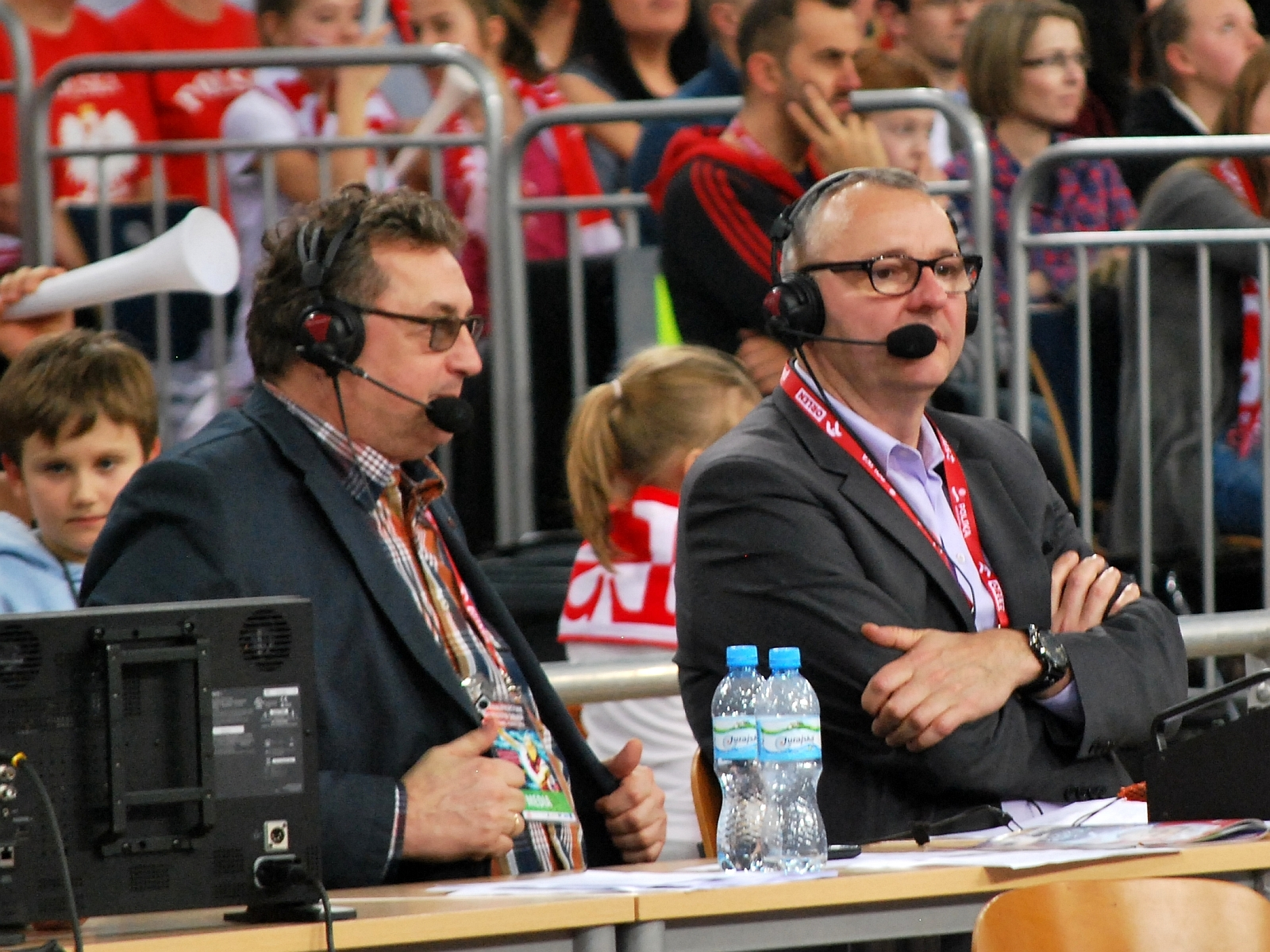
Wojciech Drzyzga and Tomasz Swędrowski as commentators during the 2014 Women's World Championship qualification in January at Atlas Arena, Łódź.

== Personal life ==
He is married to Janina. They have two sons, Tomasz (born 1985) and Fabian (born 1990).

== Honours ==
=== As a player ===
- Domestic
  - 1982–83 Polish Championship, with Legia Warsaw
  - 1983–84 Polish Cup, with Legia Warsaw
  - 1983–84 Polish Championship, with Legia Warsaw
  - 1985–86 Polish Cup, with Legia Warsaw
  - 1985–86 Polish Championship, with Legia Warsaw
  - 1989–90 French Cup, with JSA Bordeaux

=== As a coach ===
- Domestic
  - 1994–95 Polish Cup, with Legia Warsaw

== Volleyball commentator ==
Since 2003, Wojciech Drzyzga has been working as a volleyball commentator at Polsat Sport (earlier also at TV4), often with Tomasz Swędrowski. He comments on the most important volleyball events broadcast in Poland.
