= Antonio Pérez (volleyball) =

Cuban volleyball player

Personal information
- Full name: Antonio Pérez López
- Nationality: Cuban
- Born: 10 October 1956 (age 70)
- Height: 1.94 m (6 ft 4 in)

Volleyball information
- Number: 9

National team
1977–1984	Cuba
Honours
Men's volleyball
Representing Cuba
World Championship
Bronze medal – third place	1978 Italy
FIVB World Cup
Silver medal – second place	1981 Japan
Bronze medal – third place	1977 Japan
Friendship Games
Silver medal – second place	1984 Havana
Pan American Games
Gold medal – first place	1979 Caguas	Team
Silver medal – second place	1983 Caracas	Team
Central American and Caribbean Games
Gold medal – first place	1978 Medellín	Team
Gold medal – first place	1982 Havana	Team

Antonio Pérez (born 10 October 1956) is a retired Cuban volleyball player. He competed in the men's tournament at the 1980 Summer Olympics in Moscow. He won a bronze medal at the 1978 FIVB World Championship in Italy, a gold medal at the 1979 Pan American Games in Caguas, and a silver medal at the 1983 Pan American Games in Caracas.
