= Dörte Stüdemann =

German volleyball player (born 1964)

Personal information
- Full name: Dörte Stüdemann (-Techel)
- Born: 14 February 1964 (age 62); Güstrow, East Germany
- Height: 170 cm (5 ft 7 in)

Volleyball information
- Position: Setter
- Number: 10

National team
1984–1989	East Germany
Honours
Women's volleyball
Representing East Germany
Friendship Games
Bronze medal – third place	1984 Varna
European Championship
Gold medal – first place	1987 Belgium
Silver medal – second place	1985 Netherlands

Dörte Stüdemann (born 14 February 1964) is a German former volleyball player. She competed in the women's tournament at the 1988 Summer Olympics in Seoul.
