= Monika Beu =

German volleyball player (1963–2005)

Personal information
- Born: 30 April 1963; East Berlin, East Germany
- Died: 14 March 2005 (aged 41); Berlin, Germany
- Height: 182 cm (6 ft 0 in)

Volleyball information
- Position: Opposite
- Number: 3

National team
1981–1988	East Germany
Honours
Women's volleyball
Representing East Germany
Friendship Games
Bronze medal – third place	1984 Varna
European Championship
Gold medal – first place	1983 East Germany
Gold medal – first place	1987 Belgium
Silver medal – second place	1985 Netherlands

Monika Beu (30 April 1963 – 14 March 2005) was a German volleyball player. She competed in the women's tournament at the 1988 Summer Olympics in Seoul, representing East Germany.
