= Luis Oviedo (volleyball) =

Cuban volleyball player (born 1957)

Personal information
- Full name: Luis Oviedo Bonilla
- Nationality: Cuban
- Born: 24 March 1957 (age 69)
- Height: 1.90 m (6 ft 3 in)

Volleyball information
- Number: 3

National team
1977–1986	Cuba
Honours
Men's volleyball
Representing Cuba
World Championship
Bronze medal – third place	1978 Italy
FIVB World Cup
Silver medal – second place	1981 Japan
Bronze medal – third place	1977 Japan
Friendship Games
Silver medal – second place	1984 Havana
Pan American Games
Gold medal – first place	1979 Caguas	Team
Silver medal – second place	1983 Caracas	Team
Central American and Caribbean Games
Gold medal – first place	1978 Medellín	Team
Gold medal – first place	1986 Santiago de los Caballeros	Team

Luis Oviedo (born 24 March 1957) is a former Cuban volleyball player. He competed in the men's tournament at the 1980 Summer Olympics in Moscow, Soviet Union. He played a key role in helping Cuba win the bronze medal at the 1978 FIVB World Championship in Italy.

Oviedo also contributed to Cuba's victory at the 1979 Pan American Games, where the team won the gold medal, and also earned a silver medal at the 1983 Pan American Games.
