= Heike Jensen =

German volleyball player (born 1965)

Personal information
- Full name: Heike Jensen (-Schlufter)
- Nationality: German
- Born: 21 July 1965 (age 61); Dresden, East Germany
- Height: 185 cm (6 ft 1 in)
Honours
Women's volleyball
Representing East Germany
European Championship
| Gold medal – first place | 1987 Belgium | Team |
| Silver medal – second place | 1985 Netherlands | Team |

Heike Jensen (born 21 July 1965) is a German former volleyball player. She competed in the women's tournament at the 1988 Summer Olympics for East Germany – her younger sister Grit was also a member of the team.
