= Volleyball at the Friendship Games =

Volleyball at the Friendship Games was contested in two events. Men's event took place at the Ciudad Deportiva in Havana, Cuba between 18 and 26 August 1984. Women's event took place in Varna, Bulgaria between 8 and 15 July 1984.

== Men's event ==
Six teams competed in a round-robin tournament.

| | Team | Pld | W | L | Sets won | Sets lost | Points |
|---|---|---|---|---|---|---|---|
| Gold medal | Soviet Union | 5 | 5 | 0 | 15 | 4 | 10 |
| Silver medal | Cuba | 5 | 4 | 1 | 13 | 5 | 9 |
| Bronze medal | Poland | 5 | 3 | 2 | 12 | 8 | 8 |
| 4 | Czechoslovakia | 5 | 2 | 3 | 8 | 10 | 7 |
| 5 | Bulgaria | 5 | 1 | 4 | 6 | 12 | 6 |
| 6 | Hungary | 5 | 0 | 5 | 0 | 15 | 5 |

=== Results ===
| Results | (Soviet Union) | (Cuba) | (Poland) | (Czechoslovakia) | (Bulgaria) | (Hungary) |
|---|---|---|---|---|---|---|
| Soviet Union | | 3:1 | 3:1 | 3:1 | 3:1 | 3:0 |
| Cuba | 1:3 | | 3:2 | 3:0 | 3:0 | 3:0 |
| Poland | 1:3 | 2:3 | | 3:1 | 3:1 | 3:0 |
| Czechoslovakia | 1:3 | 0:3 | 1:3 | | 3:1 | 3:0 |
| Bulgaria | 1:3 | 0:3 | 1:3 | 1:3 | | 3:0 |
| Hungary | 0:3 | 0:3 | 0:3 | 0:3 | 0:3 | |

== Women's event ==
Ten teams were drawn into two groups.

=== Group A ===
| Team | Pld | W | L | Sets won | Sets lost | Points |
|---|---|---|---|---|---|---|
| North Korea | 4 | 3 | 1 | 11 | 3 | 7 |
| East Germany | 4 | 3 | 1 | 9 | 4 | 7 |
| Bulgaria | 4 | 3 | 1 | 10 | 6 | 7 |
| France | 4 | 1 | 3 | 4 | 9 | 5 |
| Czechoslovakia | 4 | 0 | 4 | 0 | 12 | 4 |

==== Results ====
| Results | (North Korea) | (East Germany) | (Bulgaria) | (France) | (Czechoslovakia) |
|---|---|---|---|---|---|
| North Korea | | 3:0 | 2:3 | 3:0 | 3:0 |
| East Germany | 0:3 | | 3:1 | 3:0 | 3:0 |
| Bulgaria | 3:2 | 1:3 | | 3:1 | 3:0 |
| France | 0:3 | 0:3 | 0:3 | | 3:0 |
| Czechoslovakia | 0:3 | 0:3 | 0:3 | 0:3 | |

=== Group B ===
| Team | Pld | W | L | Sets won | Sets lost | Points |
|---|---|---|---|---|---|---|
| Cuba | 4 | 4 | 0 | 12 | 4 | 8 |
| Soviet Union | 4 | 3 | 1 | 11 | 3 | 7 |
| Hungary | 4 | 2 | 2 | 7 | 9 | 6 |
| Poland | 4 | 1 | 3 | 5 | 10 | 5 |
| Netherlands | 4 | 0 | 4 | 3 | 12 | 4 |

==== Results ====
| Results | (Cuba) | (Soviet Union) | (Hungary) | (Poland) | (Netherlands) |
|---|---|---|---|---|---|
| Cuba | | 3:2 | 3:1 | 3:1 | 3:0 |
| Soviet Union | 2:3 | | 3:0 | 3:0 | 3:0 |
| Hungary | 1:3 | 0:3 | | 3:1 | 3:2 |
| Poland | 1:3 | 0:3 | 1:3 | | 3:1 |
| Netherlands | 0:3 | 0:3 | 2:3 | 1:3 | |

=== Final round ===
Semifinals
A1 | North Korea | 1
B2 | Soviet Union | 3
B1 | Cuba | 3
A2 | East Germany | 0

Final
Soviet Union | 1
Cuba | 3
Third place
North Korea | 0
East Germany | 3

==== Final ====
| Date | | Score | | Set 1 | Set 2 | Set 3 | Set 4 | Set 5 | Total |
|---|---|---|---|---|---|---|---|---|---|
| 15 Jul | Soviet Union | 1–3 | Cuba | 8–15 | 16–14 | 5–15 | 6–15 | | 35–59 |

=== Classification 5th–10th ===
5th-8th place
A3 | Bulgaria | 3
B4 | Poland | 2
B3 | Hungary | 3
A4 | France | 1

5th place match
Bulgaria | 3
Hungary | 1
7th place match
Poland | 3
France | 0

| 9th place match |
| A5 | Czechoslovakia | 1 |
| B5 | Netherlands | 3 |

== Winning teams' squads ==
| Event | Gold | Silver | Bronze |
|---|---|---|---|
| Men's | Soviet Union Yaroslav Antonov; Viktor Artamonov; Albert Dillenburg; Aleksandr Ivanov; Yuri Panchenko; Aleksandr Savin; Yuri Sapega; Pavel Selivanov; Oleg Smugilyev; Oleksandr Sorokalet; Vladimir Shkurikhin; Viacheslav Zaitsev | Cuba Osvaldo Abreu; Rodolfo Guillén; Eugenio Ortiz; Luis Oviedo; Águedo Páez; Antonio Pérez; Roberto Pérez; Carlos Ruíz; Carlos Sánchez; Abel Sarmientos; Manuel Torres; Raúl Vilches | Poland Wojciech Drzyzga; Wacław Golec; Ryszard Jurek; Marian Kardas; Waldemar Kasprzak; Ireneusz Kłos; Andrzej Martyniuk; Włodzimierz Nalazek; Jerzy Pawełek; Jacek Rychlicki; Krzysztof Stefanowicz; Zbigniew Zieliński |
| Women's | Cuba Josefina Capote; Ana María Crespo; Imilsis Téllez; Norka Latamblet Daudinot; Josefina O'Farrill; Alejandrina Hernández; Teresa Hernández; Lazara González; Mercedes Pomares; Nancy González; Lucila Savon; Rubinelda Henry | Soviet Union Viesma Aistere; Yelena Kundaleva; Vyera Bondar; Yelena Chebukina; Irina Kirillova; Liubov Kozyreva; Olga Krivosheyeva; Valentina Ogiyenko; Olga Pozdniakova; Irina Rizen; Tatiana Shapovalova; Yelena Volkova | East Germany Maike Arlt; Monika Beu; Andrea Heim; Catrin Heydrich; Grit Jensen; Ramona Landgraf; Heike Lehmann; Karia Mügge; Ute Oldenburg; Ariane Radfan; Martina Schwarz; Dörte Stüdemann |

== Medal table ==
* Host nation (Host nation (Cuba). The second host nation, Bulgaria, won no medals.)

| Rank | Nation | Gold | Silver | Bronze | Total |
|---|---|---|---|---|---|
| 1 | Cuba (CUB)* | 1 | 1 | 0 | 2 |
| 1 | Soviet Union (URS) | 1 | 1 | 0 | 2 |
| 3 | East Germany (GDR) | 0 | 0 | 1 | 1 |
| 3 | Poland (POL) | 0 | 0 | 1 | 1 |
| Totals (4 entries) | | 2 | 2 | 2 | 6 |

== See also ==
- Volleyball at the 1984 Summer Olympics
