= Carlos Ruíz (volleyball) =

Cuban volleyball player

Personal information
- Full name: Carlos Ruíz Lafargue
- Nationality: Cuban
- Born: 9 November 1957 (age 68)
- Height: 1.93 m (6 ft 4 in)

Volleyball information
- Number: 11

National team
1978–1986	Cuba
Honours
Men's volleyball
Representing Cuba
World Championship
Bronze medal – third place	1978 Italy
FIVB World Cup
Silver medal – second place	1981 Japan
Friendship Games
Silver medal – second place	1984 Havana
Pan American Games
Gold medal – first place	1979 Caguas	Team
Silver medal – second place	1983 Caracas	Team
Central American and Caribbean Games
Gold medal – first place	1978 Medellín	Team
Gold medal – first place	1986 Santiago de los Caballeros	Team

Carlos Ruíz (born 9 November 1957) is a Cuban former volleyball player. He competed in the men's tournament at the 1980 Summer Olympics in Moscow, Soviet Union. He won the bronze medal with the Cuban team at the 1978 FIVB World Championship. He also won a gold medal at the 1979 Pan American Games and a silver medal at the 1983 Pan American Games while playing for Cuba.
