= Jens Gusek =

German fencer (born 1965)

Personal information
- Born: 8 July 1965 (age 60) Weißwasser, East Germany

Sport
- Sport: Fencing

Jens Gusek (born 8 July 1965) is a German former fencer. He competed in the team foil event for East Germany at the 1988 Summer Olympics.
