= Brit Wiedemann =

German volleyball player (born 1967)

Personal information
- Nationality: German
- Born: 30 January 1967 (age 58); Rostock, East Germany (now Germany)

Sport
- Sport: Volleyball

Brit Wiedemann (born 30 January 1967) is a German volleyball player. She competed in the women's tournament at the 1988 Summer Olympics.
