= Ute Langenau =

German volleyball player (born 1966)

Personal information
- Nationality: German
- Born: 16 October 1966 (age 58); Eisenhüttenstadt, East Germany

Sport
- Sport: Volleyball

Ute Langenau (born 16 October 1966) is a German volleyball player. She competed in the women's tournament at the 1988 Summer Olympics.
