= Uwe Preißler =

German cyclist (born 1967)

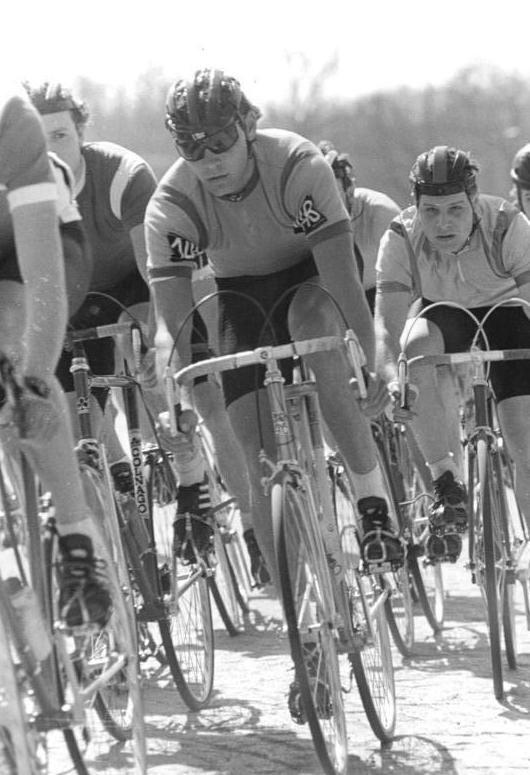
- Uwe Preißler (middle) in 1988

Personal information
- Born: 17 June 1967 (age 59) Mühlhausen, East Germany

Cycling career
- Sport: Cycling
Medal record
Men's cycling
Representing East Germany
Olympic Games
| Silver medal – second place | 1988 Seoul | Team pursuit |

Uwe Preißler (born 17 June 1967) is a German former cyclist. He competed in the team pursuit event at the 1988 Summer Olympics winning a silver medal.
