= Roland Müller (sport shooter) =

German sports shooter

Roland Müller (born 13 January 1961, in Oranienburg) is a German former sport shooter who competed in the 1988 Summer Olympics.
