= Raik Hannemann =

German swimmer

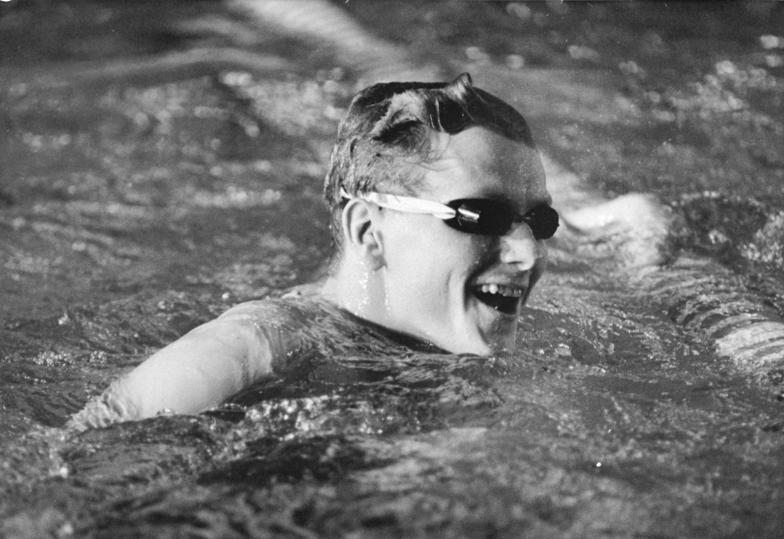
- Raik Hannemann in 1988

Personal information
- Born: 19 February 1968 Leipzig, East Germany
- Height: 1.87 m (6 ft 2 in)
- Weight: 79 kg (174 lb)

Sport
- Sport: Swimming
- Club: SC Dynamo Berlin, Berlin
Medal record
Men's swimming
Representing East Germany
European Championships
Silver medal – second place	1989 Bonn	200 m medley
Bronze medal – third place	1985 Sofia	400 m medley
Bronze medal – third place	1987 Strasbourg	200 m medley

Raik Hannemann (born 19 February 1968) is a retired German swimmer who won three medals in medley events at the LEN European Aquatics Championships of 1985–1989. He also competed at the 1988 Summer Olympics and finished seventh in the 200 m medley.

Hannemann started swimming in a club at age 6, and at age 11 enrolled to a sports school. He later became involved with the East German doping program, and since 1985 used performance-enhancing drugs. The drugs included a specially developed nasal spray that administered anabolic steroids with effects undetectable three days after use. After retirement around 1990 he became a sports reporter for a small Berlin newspaper Kurier am Abend. The same year he wrote a series of articles and took part in televised interviews exposing the past doping practices. He blamed the doping problem on the East German Sports Federation, but believed that it had spread worldwide. As of 2012 he was still working as a sports reporter.
