= 1983 Women's European Volleyball Championship =

Tournament details
- Host country: East Germany
- Dates: 17 – 25 September
- Teams: 12
- Venue: Various (in 3 host cities)

Final positions
- Champions: East Germany (1st title)

The 1983 Women's European Volleyball Championship was the thirteenth edition of the event, organised by Europe's governing volleyball body, the Confédération Européenne de Volleyball. It was hosted in several cities in East Germany from 17 to 25 September 1983, with the final round held in Rostock.

== Participating teams ==
- Bulgaria
- Czechoslovakia
- East Germany
- France
- Hungary
- Italy
- Netherlands
- Poland
- Romania
- Soviet Union
- Sweden
- West Germany

== Format ==
The tournament was played in two different stages. In the first stage, the twelve participants were divided into three groups of four teams each. In the second stage, two groups were formed, one containing the winners and runners-up from all first stage groups (six teams in total) to contest the tournament title. A second group was formed by the remaining six teams which played for position places (7th to 12th). All groups in both stages played a single round-robin format.

== Pools composition ==
Pool 1	Pool 2	Pool 3
Bulgaria	Czechoslovakia	East Germany
France	Netherlands	Hungary
Poland	Romania	Italy
West Germany	Soviet Union	Sweden

== Venues ==
Pool 1	Pool 2 and 7th–12th pool	Pool 3 and Final pool	Tournament host cities
Schwerin	Cottbus	Rostock	Tournament host cities

== Preliminary round ==
=== Pool 1 ===
- venue location: Schwerin, East Germany

Pos	Team	Pld	W	L	Pts	SW	SL	SR	SPW	SPL	SPR	Qualification
1	Bulgaria	3	2	1	5	8	3	2.667	151	120	1.258	Final pool
2	West Germany	3	2	1	5	6	4	1.500	125	108	1.157	Final pool
3	Poland	3	2	1	5	7	6	1.167	170	150	1.133	7th–12th pool
4	France	3	0	3	3	1	9	0.111	80	148	0.541	7th–12th pool

Date		Score		Set 1	Set 2	Set 3	Set 4	Set 5	Total	Report
17 Sep	West Germany	3–1	Poland	15–10	17–15	4–15	15–5		51–45	Report
17 Sep	Bulgaria	3–0	France	15–13	15–4	15–7			45–24	Report
18 Sep	Bulgaria	3–0	West Germany	15–8	15–10	15–11			45–29	Report
18 Sep	Poland	3–1	France	15–8	15–13	13–15	15–2		58–38	Report
19 Sep	West Germany	3–0	France	15–11	15–5	15–2			45–18	Report
19 Sep	Poland	3–2	Bulgaria	15–11	13–15	15–9	9–15	15–11	67–61	Report

=== Pool 2 ===
- venue location: Cottbus, East Germany

Pos	Team	Pld	W	L	Pts	SW	SL	SR	SPW	SPL	SPR	Qualification
1	Soviet Union	3	3	0	6	9	1	9.000	144	68	2.118	Final pool
2	Romania	3	2	1	5	7	4	1.750	135	134	1.007	Final pool
3	Czechoslovakia	3	1	2	4	3	6	0.500	97	102	0.951	7th–12th pool
4	Netherlands	3	0	3	3	1	9	0.111	80	152	0.526	7th–12th pool

Date		Score		Set 1	Set 2	Set 3	Set 4	Set 5	Total	Report
17 Sep	Soviet Union	3–1	Romania	15–3	8–15	15–5	15–5		53–28	Report
17 Sep	Czechoslovakia	3–0	Netherlands	15–1	15–4	15–6			45–11	Report
18 Sep	Romania	3–0	Czechoslovakia	15–9	15–12	15–8			45–29	Report
18 Sep	Soviet Union	3–0	Netherlands	15–4	15–8	15–5			45–17	Report
19 Sep	Romania	3–1	Netherlands	15–17	16–14	15–7	16–14		62–52	Report
19 Sep	Soviet Union	3–0	Czechoslovakia	15–4	16–14	15–5			46–23	Report

=== Pool 3 ===
- venue location: Rostock, East Germany

Pos	Team	Pld	W	L	Pts	SW	SL	SR	SPW	SPL	SPR	Qualification
1	East Germany	3	3	0	6	9	0	MAX	136	70	1.943	Final pool
2	Hungary	3	2	1	5	6	3	2.000	120	71	1.690	Final pool
3	Italy	3	1	2	4	3	6	0.500	91	117	0.778	7th–12th pool
4	Sweden	3	0	3	3	0	9	0.000	46	135	0.341	7th–12th pool

Date		Score		Set 1	Set 2	Set 3	Set 4	Set 5	Total	Report
17 Sep	East Germany	3–0	Italy	15–7	16–14	15–5			46–26	Report
17 Sep	Hungary	3–0	Sweden	15–4	15–0	15–2			45–6	Report
18 Sep	Hungary	3–0	Italy	15–11	15–6	15–3			45–20	Report
18 Sep	East Germany	3–0	Sweden	15–6	15–3	15–5			45–14	Report
19 Sep	East Germany	3–0	Hungary	15–10	15–10	15–10			45–30	Report
19 Sep	Italy	3–0	Sweden	15–8	15–6	15–12			45–26	Report

== Final round ==
=== 7th–12th pool ===
- venue location: Cottbus, East Germany

Pos	Team	Pld	W	L	Pts	SW	SL	SR	SPW	SPL	SPR
1	Italy	5	4	1	9	12	4	3.000	208	176	1.182
2	Czechoslovakia	5	4	1	9	14	6	2.333	287	177	1.621
3	Poland	5	4	1	9	12	6	2.000	239	187	1.278
4	France	5	2	3	7	10	11	0.909	244	265	0.921
5	Netherlands	5	1	4	6	4	12	0.333	152	212	0.717
6	Sweden	5	0	5	5	2	15	0.133	138	251	0.550

Date		Score		Set 1	Set 2	Set 3	Set 4	Set 5	Total	Report
21 Sep	Poland	3–1	France	15–8	15–13	13–15	15–2		58–38	Report
21 Sep	Czechoslovakia	3–0	Netherlands	15–1	15–4	15–6			45–11	Report
21 Sep	Italy	3–0	Sweden	15–8	15–6	15–12			45–26	Report
22 Sep	Czechoslovakia	3–1	Sweden	14–16	15–6	15–11	16–4		60–37	Report
22 Sep	Italy	3–1	France	15–7	15–10	11–15	15–12		56–44	Report
22 Sep	Poland	3–0	Netherlands	15–4	15–9	15–3			45–16	Report
23 Sep	Czechoslovakia	3–0	Italy	15–8	15–5	15–4			45–17	Report
23 Sep	Poland	3–0	Sweden	15–9	15–6	15–6			45–21	Report
23 Sep	France	3–1	Netherlands	15–11	15–13	13–15	15–7		58–46	Report
24 Sep	Italy	3–0	Poland	15–7	15–7	15–13			45–27	Report
24 Sep	Netherlands	3–0	Sweden	15–5	15–11	15–3			45–19	Report
24 Sep	Czechoslovakia	3–2	France	15–17	15–8	15–4	10–15	15–4	70–48	Report
25 Sep	Italy	3–0	Netherlands	15–12	15–10	15–12			45–34	Report
25 Sep	France	3–1	Sweden	15–11	11–15	15–7	15–2		56–35	Report
25 Sep	Poland	3–2	Czechoslovakia	15–13	10–15	7–15	15–9	17–15	64–67	Report

=== Final pool ===
- venue location: Rostock, East Germany

Pos	Team	Pld	W	L	Pts	SW	SL	SR	SPW	SPL	SPR
1	East Germany	5	5	0	10	15	5	3.000	280	194	1.443
2	Soviet Union	5	4	1	9	14	7	2.000	268	211	1.270
3	Hungary	5	3	2	8	11	6	1.833	223	177	1.260
4	Bulgaria	5	2	3	7	9	9	1.000	199	232	0.858
5	West Germany	5	1	4	6	4	13	0.308	181	227	0.797
6	Romania	5	0	5	5	2	15	0.133	138	248	0.556

Date		Score		Set 1	Set 2	Set 3	Set 4	Set 5	Total	Report
21 Sep	Bulgaria	3–0	West Germany	15–8	15–10	15–11			45–29	Report
21 Sep	Soviet Union	3–1	Romania	15–3	8–15	15–5	15–5		53–28	Report
21 Sep	East Germany	3–0	Hungary	15–10	15–10	15–10			45–30	Report
22 Sep	Hungary	3–0	Bulgaria	15–1	15–7	15–9			45–17	Report
22 Sep	East Germany	3–0	Romania	15–3	15–5	15–7			45–15	Report
22 Sep	Soviet Union	3–0	West Germany	15–7	16–14	15–4			46–25	Report
23 Sep	Hungary	3–0	Romania	16–14	15–13	15–4			46–31	Report
23 Sep	Soviet Union	3–1	Bulgaria	13–15	15–8	15–5	15–10		58–38	Report
23 Sep	East Germany	3–1	West Germany	15–10	15–8	14–16	15–6		59–40	Report
24 Sep	West Germany	3–1	Romania	15–1	14–16	15–13	15–2		59–32	Report
24 Sep	East Germany	3–2	Bulgaria	15–6	12–15	11–15	15–9	15–9	68–54	Report
24 Sep	Soviet Union	3–2	Hungary	8–15	3–15	15–13	15–8	15–6	56–57	Report
25 Sep	Bulgaria	3–0	Romania	15–12	15–13	15–7			45–32	Report
25 Sep	Hungary	3–0	West Germany	15–11	15–7	15–10			45–28	Report
25 Sep	East Germany	3–2	Soviet Union	6–15	11–15	15–8	15–3	16–14	63–55	Report

== Final ranking ==
Place	Team
1st place, gold medalist(s)	East Germany
2nd place, silver medalist(s)	Soviet Union
3rd place, bronze medalist(s)	Hungary
4.	Bulgaria
5.	West Germany
6.	Romania
7.	Italy
8.	Czechoslovakia
9.	Poland
10.	France
11.	Netherlands
12.	Sweden

Qualified for the 1984 Olympic Games

1983 Women's European champions

East Germany
First title

Team Roster
Ariane Radfan, Heike Lehmann, Maike Arlt, Monika Beu, Andrea Heim, Grit Naumann, Ramona Landgraf, Martina Schmidt, Ute Oldenburg, Kathrin Heidrich, Silke Schott and Karla Roffeis.
Head coach: Dieter Grund.
