= Kathrin Langschwager =

German volleyball player (born 1966)

Personal information
- Full name: Kathrin Langschwager (-Sydlik)
- Nationality: German
- Born: 18 December 1966 (age 59); Rostock, East Germany
- Height: 180 cm (5 ft 11 in)

Volleyball information
- Position: Setter
- Number: 5
Honours
Women's volleyball
Representing East Germany
European Championship
| Gold medal – first place | 1987 Belgium | Team |

Kathrin Langschwager (born 18 December 1966) is a German volleyball player. She competed in the women's tournament at the 1988 Summer Olympics.
