= Steffi Schmidt =

German volleyball player (born 1968)

Personal information
- Nationality: German
- Born: 13 January 1968 (age 57); Staßfurt, East Germany

Sport
- Sport: Volleyball

Steffi Schmidt (born 13 January 1968) is a German former volleyball player. She competed for East Germany in the women's tournament at the 1988 Summer Olympics.
