= East Germany women's national volleyball team =

National sports team

East Germany
- Association: East German Volleyball Federation
- Confederation: CEV
- FIVB ranking: NR (2 October 2026)

Uniforms
Home	Away	Third

Summer Olympics
- Appearances: 3 (First in 1976)
- Best result: (silver) Runners-Up : (1980)

World Championship
- Appearances: 7 (First in 1956)
- Best result: 4th place : (1974, 1986)

World Cup
- Appearances: 1 (First in 1989)
- Best result: 5th place : (1989)

European Championship
- Appearances: 12 (First in 1958)
- Best result: (gold) Champions : (1983, 1987)
- www.volleyball-verband.de (in German)
Honours
Medal record
Summer Olympic Games
Silver medal – second place	1980 Moscow	Team
European Championship
Gold medal – first place	1983 East Germany
Gold medal – first place	1987 Belgium
Silver medal – second place	1977 Finland
Silver medal – second place	1979 France
Silver medal – second place	1985 Netherlands
Silver medal – second place	1989 West Germany
Bronze medal – third place	1975 Yugoslavia

The East Germany women's national volleyball team was the national team of East Germany. It was governed by the Deutscher Sportverband Volleyball der DDR (GDR German Volleyball Association) and took part in international volleyball competitions until it was disbanded in 1990 following German reunification and incorporated into United Germany national team.

== Team record ==
=== Olympic Games results ===
- 1976 — 6th Place
- 1980 — (silver) 2nd Place
- 1988 — 5th Place

=== World Championship ===
Champions Runners Up Third Place Fourth Place

World Championship record
Year	Round	Position	Pld	W	L	SW	SL
(Soviet Union) 1952	Did not participate						
(France) 1956		8th Place					
(Brazil) 1960	Did not participate						
(Soviet Union) 1962		7th Place					
(Japan) 1967	Did not participate						
(Bulgaria) 1970		10th Place					
(Mexico) 1974		4th Place					
(Soviet Union) 1978		8th Place					
(Peru) 1982	Did not qualify						
(Czechoslovakia) 1986		4th Place					
(China) 1990		12th Place					
Total	0 Titles	7/11					

=== FIVB Volleyball World Cup ===
- 1989 — 5th Place

=== European Championship ===
Champions Runners Up Third Place Fourth Place

European Championship record
Year	Round	Position	Pld	W	L	SW	SL
(Czechoslovakia) 1949	Did not participate						
(Bulgaria) 1950	Did not participate						
(France) 1951	Did not participate						
(Romania) 1955	Did not participate						
(Czechoslovakia) 1958		8th Place					
(Romania) 1963	Semi-finals	4th Place					
(Turkey) 1967	Semi-finals	4th Place					
(Italy) 1971		6th Place					
(Socialist Federal Republic of Yugoslavia) 1975	Semi-finals	Third Place					
(Finland) 1977	Final Round	Runners Up					
(France) 1979	Final Round	Runners Up					
(Bulgaria) 1981	Semi-finals	4th Place					
(East Germany) 1983	Final Round	Champions					
(Netherlands) 1985	Final Round	Runners Up					
(Belgium) 1987	Final Round	Champions					
(West Germany) 1989	Final Round	Runners Up					
Total	2 Titles	12/16					

== Team ==
=== 1986 World Championship squad ===
No.	Name	Date of birth	Height	Weight
2	Ute Bitterlich			
3	Monika Beu			
4	Ariane Radfan			
5	Kathrin Langschwager			
6	Maike Arlt			
7	Anke Lindemann			
8	Ute Oldenburg			
9	Heike Jensen			
10	Dorte Studemann			
11	Ramona Landgraf			
14	Ute Landgenau			

=== Managers ===
EAST GERMANY TEAM MANAGERS	FROM	TO
Fritz Döring	1951	1953
Egon Saurer	1954	1966
Harry Einert	1967	1970
Wolfgang Kipf	1971	1972
Dieter Grund	1973	1984
Gerhard Fidelak	1984	1984
Wolfgang Küllmer	1985	1985
Siegfried Köhler	1985	1987
Eckehard Bonnke	1989	1989
Siegfried Köhler	1989	1990
Volker Spiegel	1990	1990
