= Germany women's national volleyball team =

Germany
- Nickname(s): Die Schmetterlinge (The butterflies). Die Adler (The Eagles); Die Mannschaft (The Team)
- Association: Deutscher Volleyball-Verband
- Confederation: CEV
- Head coach: Giulio Cesare Bregoli
- FIVB ranking: 12 ▼2 (2 October 2026)

Uniforms
Home	Away

Summer Olympics
- Appearances: 8 (Note: by Germany national team, East Germany national team and West Germany national team) (First in 1972)
- Best result: (silver) (1980 (GDR))

World Championship
- Appearances: 18 (Note: by Germany national team, East Germany national team and West Germany national team) (First in 1956)
- Best result: 4th place (1974 (GDR), 1986 (GDR))

World Cup
- Appearances: 3 (Note: by Germany national team and East Germany national team) (First in 1989)
- Best result: 6th place (1989 (GDR), 2011)

European Championship
- Appearances: 30 (Note: by Germany national team, East Germany national team and West Germany national team) (First in 1958)
- Best result: (gold) 1983 (GDR), 1987 (GDR)
- www.volleyball-verband.de (in German)
Honours
Medal record
Olympic Games
Silver medal – second place	1980 Moscow	Team
FIVB World Grand Prix
Bronze medal – third place	2002 Hong Kong	Team
Bronze medal – third place	2009 Japan
European Championship
Gold medal – first place	1983 East Germany
Gold medal – first place	1987 Belgium
Silver medal – second place	1977 Finland
Silver medal – second place	1979 France
Silver medal – second place	1985 Netherlands
Silver medal – second place	1989 West Germany
Silver medal – second place	2011 Italy/Serbia
Silver medal – second place	2013 Germany/Switzerland
Bronze medal – third place	1975 Yugoslavia
Bronze medal – third place	1991 Italy
Bronze medal – third place	2003 Turkey
European League
Gold medal – first place	2013 Varna
Silver medal – second place	2014 Rüsselsheim am Main / Bursa
Summer Universiade
Bronze medal – third place	1985 Kobe
Bronze medal – third place	1987 Zagreb

The Germany women's national volleyball team is the national volleyball team of Germany. It is governed by the German Volleyball Association (German: Deutscher Volleyball-Verband or DVV).

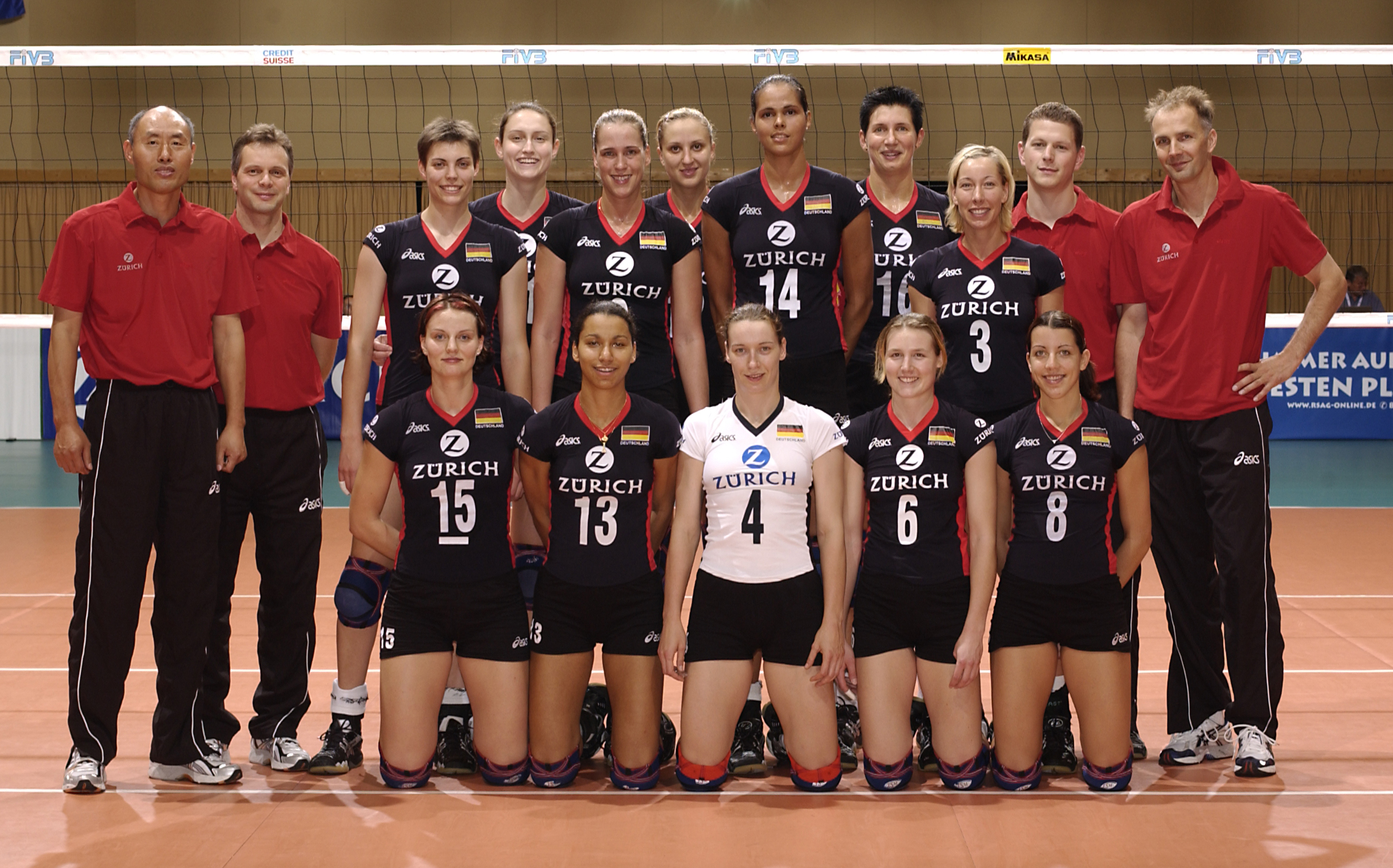
Germany women's national volleyball team at the Olympic Games 2004

== Team record ==
=== Olympic Games ===
Gold Silver Bronze Fourth place

Summer Olympics record
Year	Round	Position	Pld	W	L	SW	SL	Squad	Team
(Japan) 1964	did not qualify								
(Mexico) 1968	did not qualify								
(West Germany) 1972	5th–8th places	8th	5	0	5	0	15	Squad	West Germany
(Canada) 1976	5th–8th places	6th	5	1	4	8	14	Squad	East Germany
(Soviet Union) 1980	Final	Silver	5	3	2	11	11	Squad	East Germany
(United States) 1984	5th–8th places	6th	5	2	3	6	9	Squad	West Germany
(South Korea) 1988	5th–8th places	5th	5	3	2	10	10	Squad	East Germany
(Spain) 1992	did not qualify								
(United States) 1996	5th–8th places	8th	8	2	6	10	18	Squad	Germany
(Australia) 2000	5th–8th places	6th	8	3	5	12	17	Squad	Germany
(Greece) 2004	Group stage	9th	5	2	3	7	11	Squad	Germany
(China) 2008	did not qualify								
(United Kingdom) 2012	did not qualify								
(Brazil) 2016	did not qualify								
(Japan) 2020	did not qualify								
(France) 2024	did not qualify								
(United States) 2028	future event								
(Australia) 2032	future event								
Total	0 Title	8/15	46	16	30	64	105		

=== World Championship ===
Champions Runners Up Third Place Fourth Place

World Championship record AS East Germany
Year	Round	Position	Pld	W	L	SW	SL
(Soviet Union) 1952	did not participate						
(France) 1956		8th Place	10	4	6	16	21
(Brazil) 1960	did not participate						
(Soviet Union) 1962		7th Place	9	4	5	13	19
(Japan) 1967	did not participate						
(Bulgaria) 1970		10th Place	9	6	3	21	13
(Mexico) 1974		4th Place	11	6	5	20	19
(Soviet Union) 1978		8th Place	9	4	5	16	19
(Peru) 1982	did not qualify						
(Czechoslovakia) 1986		4th Place	8	5	3	18	13
(China) 1990		12th Place	6	1	5	4	15
Total	0 Titles	7/11	62	30	32	108	119

World Championship record AS West Germany
Year	Round	Position	Pld	W	L	SW	SL
(Soviet Union) 1952	did not participate						
(France) 1956		16th Place	8	1	7	3	22
(Brazil) 1960		10th Place	5	1	4	3	14
(Soviet Union) 1962		13th Place	7	1	6	3	18
(Japan) 1967	did not participate						
(Bulgaria) 1970	did not qualify						
(Mexico) 1974		19th Place	10	5	5	15	17
(Soviet Union) 1978		18th Place	8	2	6	8	21
(Peru) 1982		14th Place	9	5	4	17	12
(Czechoslovakia) 1986		13th Place	6	3	3	10	10
(China) 1990		13th Place	6	3	3	11	11
Total	0 Titles	8/11	59	21	38	70	125

World Championship record AS Germany
Year	Round	Position	Pld	W	L	SW	SL
(Brazil) 1994	5th–8th Places	5th Place	7	5	2	15	9
(Japan) 1998	First Round	13th Place	3	0	3	2	9
(Germany) 2002	Second Round	10th Place	8	3	5	10	18
(Japan) 2006	9th–12th Places	11th Place	11	6	5	24	16
(Japan) 2010	5th–8th Places	7th Place	11	7	4	24	14
(Italy) 2014	Second Round	9th Place	9	4	5	19	15
(Japan) 2018	Second Round	11th Place	9	5	4	16	15
(Netherlands) / (Poland) 2022	Second Round	14th Place	9	3	6	14	20
(Thailand) 2025	Round of 16	12th place	4	2	2	8	6
(Canada) / (United States) 2027	To be determined						
(Philippines) 2029	To be determined						
Total	0 Titles	9/13	71	35	36	132	122

=== World Grand Prix ===
Champions Runners Up Third Place Fourth Place

World Grand Prix record
Year	Round	Position	Pld	W	L	SW	SL
(Hong Kong) 1993		8th Place	9	1	8	7	26
(China) 1994		10th Place	9	1	8	5	25
(China) 1995		8th Place	12	0	12	2	36
(China) 1996	did not participate						
(Japan) 1997	did not participate						
(Hong Kong) 1998	did not participate						
(China) 1999	did not participate						
(Philippines) 2000	did not participate						
(Macau) 2001		8th Place	13	1	12	9	38
(Hong Kong) 2002	Semi-finals	Third Place	12	6	6	20	20
(Italy) 2003		7th Place	5	2	3	10	11
(Italy) 2004		6th Place	12	5	7	20	27
(Japan) 2005		10th Place	9	1	8	7	26
(Italy) 2006	did not qualify						
(China) 2007	did not qualify						
(Japan) 2008		8th Place	9	4	5	16	16
(Japan) 2009	Semi-finals	Third Place	14	7	7	29	26
(China) 2010		9th Place	9	2	7	12	22
(Macau) 2011		13th Place	9	2	7	10	22
(China) 2012		7th Place	9	6	3	20	11
(Japan) 2013		11th Place	9	4	5	21	17
(Japan) 2014		10th Place	9	4	5	16	18
(United States) 2015		7th Place	9	4	5	15	17
(Thailand) 2016		12th place	9	0	9	4	27
(China) 2017		15th place	11	9	2	30	10
Total	0 Titles	18/25	178	59	119	253	395

=== Nations League ===
Champions Runners-up Third place Fourth place

Nations League record
Year	Round	Position	GP	MW	ML	SW	SL	Squad
(China) 2018	Preliminary Round	11th	15	5	10	23	35	Squad
(China) 2019	Preliminary Round	10th	15	7	8	24	29	Squad
(Italy) 2021	Preliminary Round	10th	15	5	10	22	32	Squad
(Turkey) 2022	Preliminary Round	10th	12	4	8	20	27	Squad
(United States) 2023	Quarterfinals	8th	13	7	6	27	26	Squad
(Thailand) 2024	Preliminary Round	13th	12	3	9	14	28	Squad
(Poland) 2025	Quarterfinals	7th	13	7	6	29	25	Squad
(Macau) 2026	Preliminary Round	12th	12	5	7	21	25	Squad
(N/A) 2027	qualified							
Total	Qualified:	9/9	107	43	64	180	227	

=== World Cup ===
East Germany

- 1989 — 5th Place

Germany

- 1991 — 9th Place
- 2011 — 6th Place

=== European Championship ===
Champions Runners Up Third Place Fourth Place

European Championship record AS East Germany
Year	Round	Position	Pld	W	L	SW	SL
(Czechoslovakia) 1949	did not participate						
(Bulgaria) 1950	did not participate						
(France) 1951	did not participate						
(Romania) 1955	did not participate						
(Czechoslovakia) 1958		8th Place					
(Romania) 1963	Semi-finals	4th Place					
(Turkey) 1967	Semi-finals	4th Place					
(Italy) 1971		6th Place					
(Socialist Federal Republic of Yugoslavia) 1975	Semi-finals	Third Place					
(Finland) 1977	Final Round	Runners Up					
(France) 1979	Final Round	Runners Up					
(Bulgaria) 1981	Semi-finals	4th Place					
(East Germany) 1983	Final Round	Champions					
(Netherlands) 1985	Final Round	Runners Up					
(Belgium) 1987	Final Round	Champions					
(West Germany) 1989	Final Round	Runners Up					
Total	2 Titles	12/16					

European Championship record AS West Germany
Year	Round	Position	Pld	W	L	SW	SL
(Czechoslovakia) 1949	did not participate						
(Bulgaria) 1950	did not participate						
(France) 1951	did not participate						
(Romania) 1955	did not participate						
(Czechoslovakia) 1958		10th Place					
(Romania) 1963		11th Place					
(Turkey) 1967		10th Place					
(Italy) 1971		10th Place					
(Socialist Federal Republic of Yugoslavia) 1975		10th Place					
(Finland) 1977		8th Place					
(France) 1979		9th Place					
(Bulgaria) 1981		10th Place					
(East Germany) 1983		5th Place					
(Netherlands) 1985		6th Place					
(Belgium) 1987		9th Place					
(West Germany) 1989		6th Place					
Total	0 Titles	12/16					

European Championship record AS Germany
Year	Round	Position	Pld	W	L	SW	SL
(Italy) 1991	Semi-finals	Third Place	7	5	2	16	10
(Czech Republic) 1993		5th Place	7	5	2	15	12
(Netherlands) 1995	Semi-finals	4th Place	7	4	3	12	12
(Czech Republic) 1997		9/10th Place	5	1	4	4	12
(Italy) 1999	Semi-finals	4th Place	5	2	3	13	5
(Bulgaria) 2001		9th Place	5	1	4	7	13
(Turkey) 2003	Semi-finals	Third Place	7	6	1	20	7
(Croatia) 2005		11th Place	5	1	4	6	13
(Belgium) / (Luxembourg) 2007		6th Place	6	4	2	12	7
(Poland) 2009	Semi-finals	4th Place	8	5	3	16	14
(Italy) / (Serbia) 2011	Final Round	Runners Up	6	5	1	17	4
(Germany) / (Switzerland) 2013	Final Round	Runners Up	6	5	1	16	7
(Netherlands) / (Belgium) 2015	Quarterfinals	5th Place	5	3	2	11	7
(Azerbaijan) / (Georgia (country)) 2017	Quarterfinals	8th Place	5	2	3	9	12
(Hungary) / (Poland) / (Slovakia) / (Turkey) 2019	Quarterfinals	6th Place	7	6	1	20	7
(Bulgaria) (Croatia) (Romania) (Serbia) 2021	Round of 16	11th Place	6	4	2	14	9
(Belgium) / (Italy) / (Germany) / (Estonia) 2023	Round of 16	12th Place	6	2	4	9	13
(Azerbaijan) / (Czech Republic) / (Sweden) / (Turkey) 2026	Quarterfinals	8th Place	7	3	4	11	15
(Spain) 2028	To be determined						
Total	0 Titles	18/32	103	61	42	217	164

== Team ==
=== Current squad ===
The following is the German roster in the 2018 World Championship.

Head coach: Giulio Cesare Bregoli.

No.	Name	Date of birth	Height	Weight	Spike	Block	2017–18 club
1	Lenka Dürr	10 December 1990	1.71 m (5 ft 7 in)	59 kg (130 lb)	280 cm (110 in)	270 cm (110 in)	(Romania) Târgoviște
2	Pia Kästner	29 June 1998	1.82 m (6 ft 0 in)	68 kg (150 lb)	297 cm (117 in)	286 cm (113 in)	(Germany) Stuttgart
3	Denise Hanke	31 August 1989	1.79 m (5 ft 10 in)	58 kg (128 lb)	284 cm (112 in)	272 cm (107 in)	(Germany) Schwerin
4	Maren Brinker (c)	10 July 1986	1.84 m (6 ft 0 in)	68 kg (150 lb)	303 cm (119 in)	295 cm (116 in)	(Turkey) Çanakkale
5	Jana Franziska Poll	7 May 1988	1.85 m (6 ft 1 in)	69 kg (152 lb)	310 cm (120 in)	290 cm (110 in)	(Greece) Olympiacos
6	Jennifer Janiska	5 April 1994	1.84 m (6 ft 0 in)	58 kg (128 lb)	298 cm (117 in)	288 cm (113 in)	(Germany) Schwerin
8	Kimberly Drewniok	11 August 1997	1.88 m (6 ft 2 in)	73 kg (161 lb)	311 cm (122 in)	298 cm (117 in)	(Germany) Wiesbaden
10	Lena Stigrot	20 December 1994	1.84 m (6 ft 0 in)	68 kg (150 lb)	303 cm (119 in)	295 cm (116 in)	(Germany) Vilsbiburg
11	Louisa Lippmann	23 September 1994	1.91 m (6 ft 3 in)	78 kg (172 lb)	319 cm (126 in)	312 cm (123 in)	(Russia) Lokomotiv Kaliningrad
14	Marie Schölzel	1 August 1997	1.88 m (6 ft 2 in)	66 kg (146 lb)	307 cm (121 in)	299 cm (118 in)	(Germany) Schwerin
15	Barbara Roxana Wezorke	12 April 1993	1.85 m (6 ft 1 in)	75 kg (165 lb)	305 cm (120 in)	290 cm (110 in)	(Germany) Vilsbiburg
17	Anna Pogany	21 July 1994	1.70 m (5 ft 7 in)	60 kg (130 lb)	280 cm (110 in)	270 cm (110 in)	(Switzerland) Aesch Pfeffingen
21	Ivana Vanjak	30 May 1995	1.93 m (6 ft 4 in)	70 kg (150 lb)	315 cm (124 in)	306 cm (120 in)	(Germany) Münster
22	Lisa Gründing	2 December 1991	1.86 m (6 ft 1 in)	68 kg (150 lb)	303 cm (119 in)	291 cm (115 in)	(Germany) Potsdam

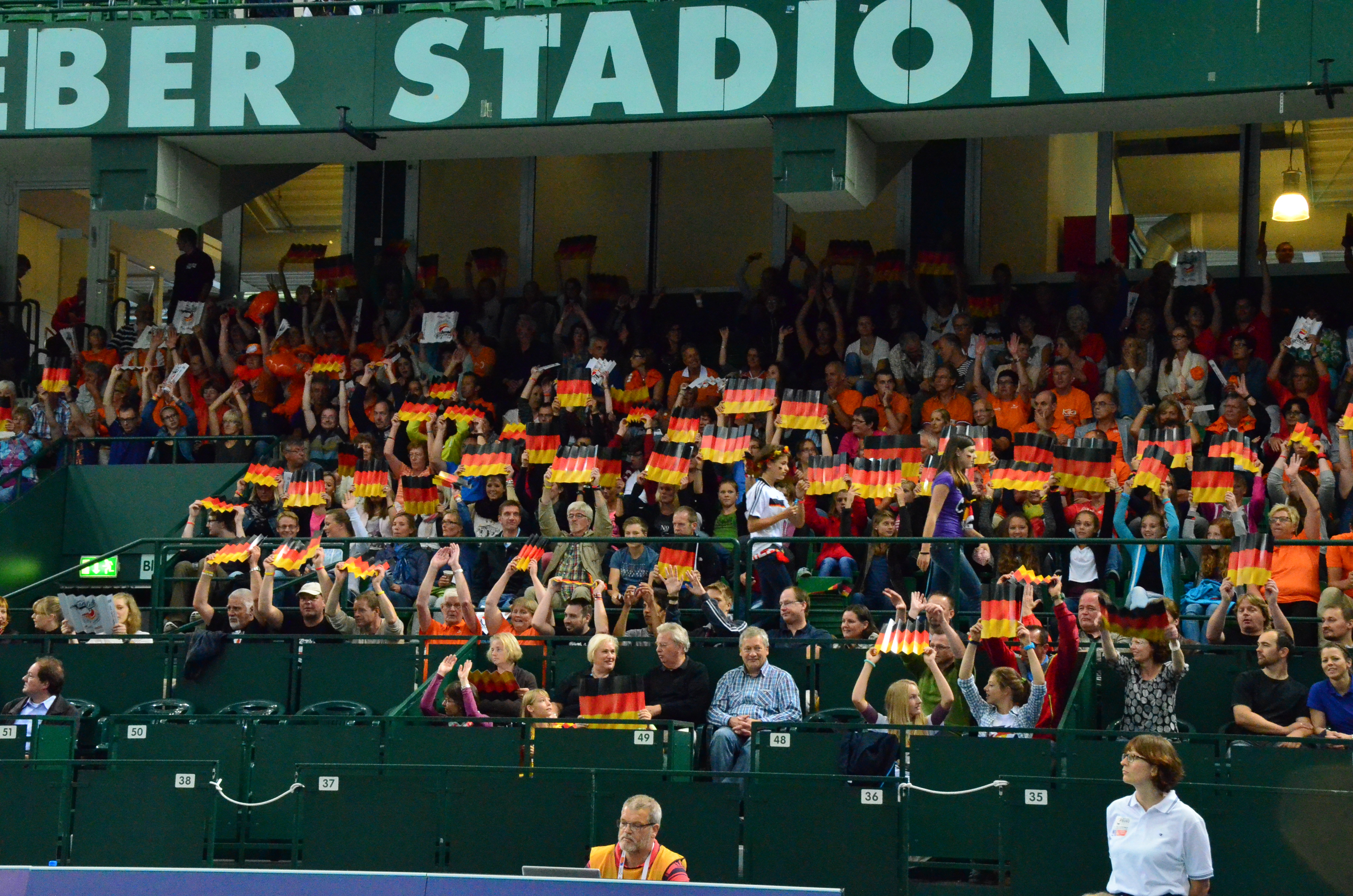
Fans in Euro Championship 2013

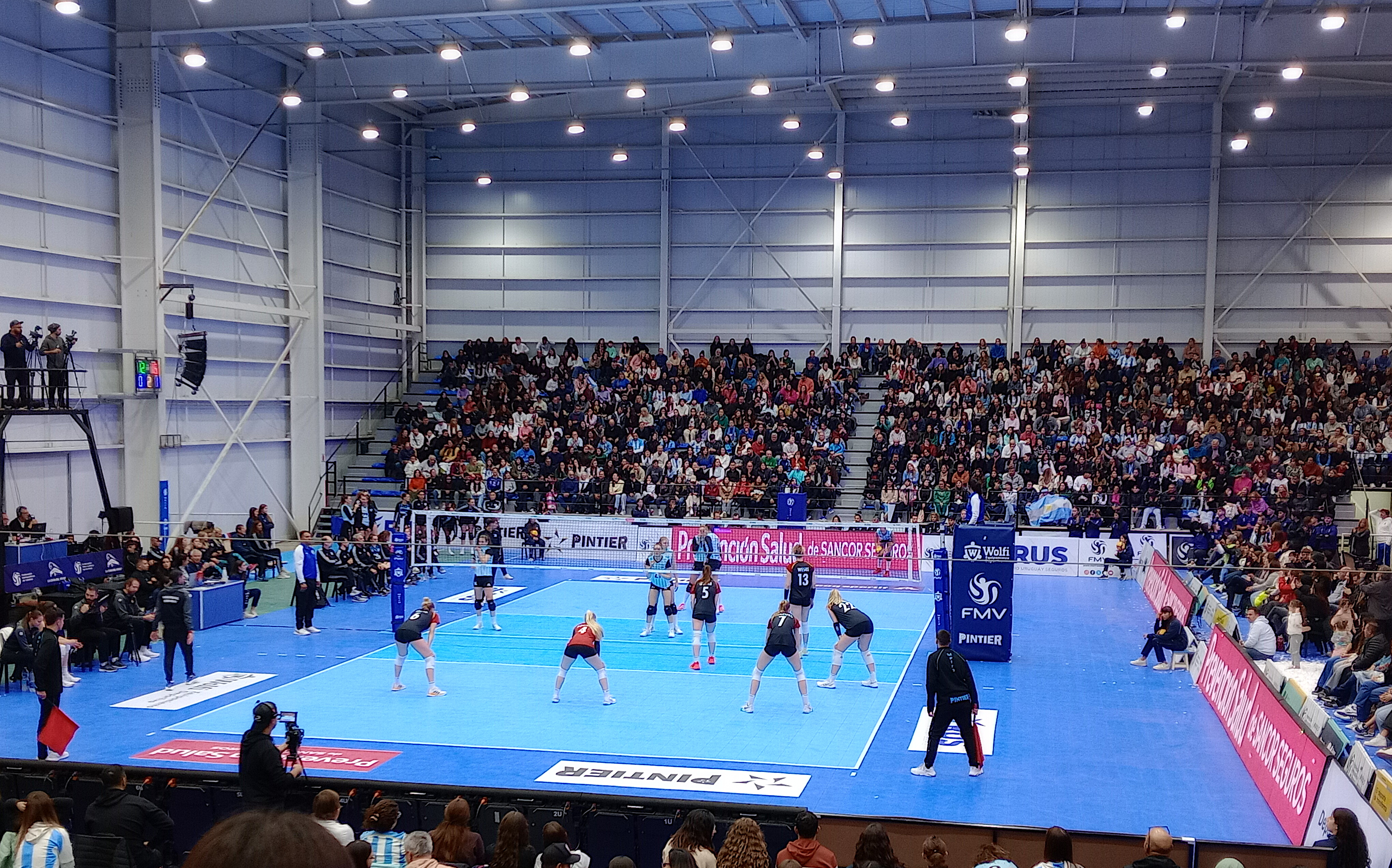
Germany facing Argentina in a friendly match in 2025

=== Managers ===
GERMANY TEAM MANAGERS SINCE 1990	FROM	TO
(Germany) Siegfried Köhler	1990	1998
(Germany) Axel Büring	1998	1999
(South Korea) Hee Wan-Lee	1999	2006
(Italy) Giovanni Guidetti	2006	2015
(Italy) Luciano Pedullà	2015	2015
(Germany) Felix Koslowski	2016	2021
(Belgium) Vital Heynen	2022	2023
(Germany) Alexander Waibl	2024	2024
(Italy) Giulio Cesare Bregoli	2025	

WEST GERMANY TEAM MANAGERS	FROM	TO
(West Germany) Theda von Hoch	1956	1971
(South Korea) Dai Hee-Park	1971	1981
(Poland) Andrzej Niemczyk	1981	1989
(West Germany) Matthias Eichinger	1989	1990

EAST GERMANY TEAM MANAGERS	FROM	TO
Fritz Döring	1951	1953
Egon Saurer	1954	1966
Harry Einert	1967	1970
Wolfgang Kipf	1971	1972
Dieter Grund	1973	1984
Gerhard Fidelak	1984	1984
Wolfgang Küllmer	1985	1985
Siegfried Köhler	1985	1987
Eckehard Bonnke	1989	1989
Siegfried Köhler	1989	1990
Volker Spiegel	1990	1990
