= 1985 Women's European Volleyball Championship =

Tournament details
- Host country: Netherlands
- Dates: 29 September – 6 October
- Teams: 12
- Venue: Various (in 5 host cities)

Final positions
- Champions: Soviet Union (11th title)

Tournament awards
- MVP: (Netherlands) Ingrid Piersma

The 1985 Women's European Volleyball Championship was the fourteenth edition of the event, organised by Europe's governing volleyball body, the Confédération Européenne de Volleyball. It was hosted in several cities in the Netherlands from 29 September to 6 October 1985, with the final round held in Arnhem.

== Participating teams ==
- Bulgaria
- Czechoslovakia
- East Germany
- France
- Greece
- Hungary
- Italy
- Netherlands
- Poland
- Romania
- Soviet Union
- West Germany

== Format ==
The tournament was played in two different stages. In the first stage, the twelve participants were divided into three groups of four teams each. In the second stage, two groups were formed, one containing the winners and runners-up from all first stage groups (six teams in total) to contest the tournament title. A second group was formed by the remaining six teams which played for position places (7th to 12th). All groups in both stages played a single round-robin format.

== Pools composition ==
Pool 1	Pool 2	Pool 3
Bulgaria	France	Hungary
Czechoslovakia	Poland	Italy
East Germany	Soviet Union	Netherlands
Greece	West Germany	Romania

== Venues ==
Pool 1	Pool 2	Tournament host cities
Beverwijk	Enschede	Tournament host cities
Pool 3	7th–12th pool	Tournament host cities
Leeuwarden	Sittard	Tournament host cities
Final pool		Tournament host cities
Arnhem		Tournament host cities

== Preliminary round ==
=== Pool 1 ===
- venue location: Beverwijk, Netherlands

Pos	Team	Pld	W	L	Pts	SW	SL	SR	SPW	SPL	SPR	Qualification
1	East Germany	3	3	0	6	9	2	4.500	164	93	1.763	Final pool
2	Czechoslovakia	3	2	1	5	7	4	1.750	143	115	1.243	Final pool
3	Bulgaria	3	1	2	4	5	6	0.833	130	132	0.985	7th–12th pool
4	Greece	3	0	3	3	0	9	0.000	38	135	0.281	7th–12th pool

Date		Score		Set 1	Set 2	Set 3	Set 4	Set 5	Total	Report
29 Sep	Czechoslovakia	3–1	Bulgaria	15–13	15–12	8–15	15–7		53–47	Report
29 Sep	East Germany	3–0	Greece	15–4	15–3	15–3			45–10	Report
30 Sep	Czechoslovakia	3–0	Greece	15–4	15–4	15–2			45–10	Report
30 Sep	East Germany	3–1	Bulgaria	15–3	15–17	15–4	16–14		61–38	Report
1 Oct	Bulgaria	3–0	Greece	15–6	15–10	15–2			45–18	Report
1 Oct	East Germany	3–1	Czechoslovakia	15–11	15–8	13–15	15–11		58–45	Report

=== Pool 2 ===
- venue location: Enschede, Netherlands

Pos	Team	Pld	W	L	Pts	SW	SL	SR	SPW	SPL	SPR	Qualification
1	Soviet Union	3	3	0	6	9	1	9.000	141	71	1.986	Final pool
2	West Germany	3	2	1	5	6	5	1.200	125	135	0.926	Final pool
3	Poland	3	1	2	4	5	6	0.833	118	135	0.874	7th–12th pool
4	France	3	0	3	3	1	9	0.111	106	149	0.711	7th–12th pool

Date		Score		Set 1	Set 2	Set 3	Set 4	Set 5	Total	Report
29 Sep	Soviet Union	3–1	Poland	15–1	15–6	6–15	15–9		51–31	Report
29 Sep	West Germany	3–1	France	16–14	15–8	13–15	15–11		59–48	Report
30 Sep	Soviet Union	3–0	West Germany	15–1	15–6	15–11			45–18	Report
30 Sep	Poland	3–0	France	15–12	15–13	15–11			45–36	Report
1 Oct	West Germany	3–1	Poland	15–9	15–9	3–15	15–9		48–42	Report
1 Oct	Soviet Union	3–0	France	15–6	15–10	15–6			45–22	Report

=== Pool 3 ===
- venue location: Leeuwarden, Netherlands

Pos	Team	Pld	W	L	Pts	SW	SL	SR	SPW	SPL	SPR	Qualification
1	Netherlands	3	2	1	5	6	3	2.000	123	103	1.194	Final pool
2	Italy	3	2	1	5	6	7	0.857	167	180	0.928	Final pool
3	Romania	3	1	2	4	6	6	1.000	154	155	0.994	7th–12th pool
4	Hungary	3	1	2	4	5	7	0.714	149	155	0.961	7th–12th pool

Date		Score		Set 1	Set 2	Set 3	Set 4	Set 5	Total	Report
29 Sep	Romania	3–0	Netherlands	15–12	15–10	15–11			45–33	Report
29 Sep	Italy	3–2	Hungary	6–15	15–12	13–15	16–14	16–14	66–70	Report
30 Sep	Netherlands	3–0	Italy	15–11	15–12	15–8			45–31	Report
30 Sep	Hungary	3–1	Romania	15–13	7–15	15–8	15–8		52–44	Report
1 Oct	Italy	3–2	Romania	15–11	14–16	11–15	15–12	15–11	70–65	Report
1 Oct	Netherlands	3–0	Hungary	15–12	15–9	15–6			45–27	Report

== Final round ==
=== 7th–12th pool ===
- venue location: Sittard, Netherlands

Pos	Team	Pld	W	L	Pts	SW	SL	SR	SPW	SPL	SPR
1	Poland	5	4	1	9	12	3	4.000	210	149	1.409
2	France	5	4	1	9	12	6	2.000	244	174	1.402
3	Hungary	5	4	1	9	12	6	2.000	228	202	1.129
4	Bulgaria	5	2	3	7	9	10	0.900	248	212	1.170
5	Romania	5	1	4	6	7	12	0.583	183	232	0.789
6	Greece	5	0	5	5	0	15	0.000	81	225	0.360

Date		Score		Set 1	Set 2	Set 3	Set 4	Set 5	Total	Report
2 Oct	Bulgaria	3–0	Greece	15–6	15–10	15–2			45–18	Report
2 Oct	Poland	3–0	France	15–12	15–13	15–11			45–36	Report
2 Oct	Hungary	3–1	Romania	15–13	7–15	15–8	15–8		52–44	Report
3 Oct	Poland	3–0	Greece	15–5	15–7	15–7			45–19	Report
3 Oct	Hungary	3–2	Bulgaria	15–11	12–15	15–10	10–15	15–13	67–64	Report
3 Oct	France	3–2	Romania	15–11	10–15	15–2	13–15	15–7	68–50	Report
4 Oct	Hungary	3–0	Greece	15–8	15–9	15–3			45–20	Report
4 Oct	France	3–1	Bulgaria	17–15	3–15	15–8	15–7		50–45	Report
4 Oct	Poland	3–0	Romania	15–4	15–6	15–3			45–13	Report
5 Oct	France	3–0	Hungary	15–7	15–6	15–6			45–19	Report
5 Oct	Romania	3–0	Greece	15–1	15–6	15–2			45–9	Report
5 Oct	Poland	3–0	Bulgaria	15–10	15–12	16–14			46–36	Report
6 Oct	France	3–0	Greece	15–8	15–7	15–0			45–15	Report
6 Oct	Bulgaria	3–1	Romania	15–8	13–15	15–5	15–3		58–31	Report
6 Oct	Hungary	3–0	Poland	15–13	15–8	15–8			45–29	Report

=== Final pool ===
- venue location: Arnhem, Netherlands

Pos	Team	Pld	W	L	Pts	SW	SL	SR	SPW	SPL	SPR
1	Soviet Union	5	5	0	10	15	2	7.500	247	146	1.692
2	East Germany	5	4	1	9	12	5	2.400	236	168	1.405
3	Netherlands	5	3	2	8	11	7	1.571	219	227	0.965
4	Czechoslovakia	5	2	3	7	7	12	0.583	215	251	0.857
5	Italy	5	1	4	6	4	13	0.308	173	240	0.721
6	West Germany	5	0	5	5	5	15	0.333	214	272	0.787

Date		Score		Set 1	Set 2	Set 3	Set 4	Set 5	Total	Report
2 Oct	East Germany	3–1	Czechoslovakia	15–11	15–8	13–15	15–11		58–45	Report
2 Oct	Soviet Union	3–0	West Germany	15–1	15–6	15–11			45–18	Report
2 Oct	Netherlands	3–0	Italy	15–11	15–12	15–8			45–31	Report
3 Oct	East Germany	3–0	Italy	16–14	15–11	15–3			46–28	Report
3 Oct	Czechoslovakia	3–2	West Germany	11–15	16–14	15–10	2–15	15–10	59–64	Report
3 Oct	Soviet Union	3–2	Netherlands	13–15	9–15	15–6	15–9	15–6	67–51	Report
4 Oct	East Germany	3–1	West Germany	15–4	13–15	15–3	15–9		58–31	Report
4 Oct	Soviet Union	3–0	Italy	15–9	15–9	15–6			45–24	Report
4 Oct	Netherlands	3–0	Czechoslovakia	15–11	15–9	15–11			45–31	Report
5 Oct	Italy	3–1	West Germany	15–12	6–15	15–11	15–10		51–48	Report
5 Oct	Soviet Union	3–0	Czechoslovakia	15–9	15–7	15–8			45–24	Report
5 Oct	East Germany	3–0	Netherlands	15–7	15–4	15–8			45–19	Report
6 Oct	Czechoslovakia	3–1	Italy	15–7	15–9	11–15	15–8		56–39	Report
6 Oct	Netherlands	3–1	West Germany	15–11	13–15	16–14	15–13		59–53	Report
6 Oct	Soviet Union	3–0	East Germany	15–11	15–10	15–8			45–29	Report

== Final ranking ==
Place	Team
1st place, gold medalist(s)	Soviet Union
2nd place, silver medalist(s)	East Germany
3rd place, bronze medalist(s)	Netherlands
4.	Czechoslovakia
5.	Italy
6.	West Germany
7.	Poland
8.	France
9.	Hungary
10.	Bulgaria
11.	Romania
12.	Greece

1985 Women's European champions

Soviet Union
Eleventh title

Team Roster
Elena Volkova, Svetlana Badulina, Valentina Ogienko, Yelena Chebukina, Dina Kackalova, Marina Kumysh, Tatyana Sidorenko, Olga Krivosheyeva, Irina Gorbatyuk, Yuliya Saltsevich, Elena Kundaleva and Svetlana Shakhova.
Head coach: Vladimir Patkin.
