= Volleyball at the 1984 Summer Olympics – Women's team rosters =

List of volleyball players

The following teams and players took part in the women's volleyball tournament at the 1984 Summer Olympics, in Los Angeles.

== Group A ==
=== Brazil ===
- Vera Mossa
- Fernanda Silva
- Mônica da Silva
- Isabel Salgado
- Heloísa Roese
- Regina Uchoa
- Jacqueline Silva
- Ana Richa
- Sandra Lima
- Eliani da Costa
- Luiza Machado
- Ida Alvares

Head coach

- Enio Silva

=== China ===
- Lang Ping
- Liang Yan
- Zhu Ling
- Hou Yuzhu
- Zhou Xiaolan
- Yang Xilan
- Su Huijuan
- Jiang Ying
- Li Yanjun
- Yang Xiaojun
- Zheng Meizhu
- Zhang Rongfang (c)

Head coach

- Yuan Weimin

=== United States ===
- Paula Weishoff
- Susan Woodstra (C)
- Rita Crockett
- Laurie Flachmeier
- Carolyn Becker
- Flo Hyman
- Rose Magers
- Julie Vollertsen
- Debbie Green-Vargas
- Kimberly Ruddins
- Jeanne Beauprey
- Linda Chisholm

Head coach

- Arie Selinger

=== West Germany ===
- Ruth Holzhausen
- Birgitta Rühmer
- Gudrun Witte
- Beate Bühler
- Regina Vossen
- Sigrid Terstegge
- Andrea Sauvigny
- Renate Riek
- Marina Staden
- Almut Kemperdick
- Terry Place-Brandel
- Ute Hankers

Head coach

- Andrzej Niemczyk

== Group B ==
=== Canada ===
- Diane Ratnik
- Suzi Smith
- Tracy Mills
- Joyce Gamborg
- Audrey Vandervelden
- Monica Hitchcock
- Karen Fraser
- Rachel Beliveau
- Lise Martin
- Caroline Côté
- Barb Broen-Ouelette
- Josée Lebel

Head coach

- Lorne Swaula

=== Japan ===
- Yumi Egami (c)
- Kimie Morita
- Yuko Mitsuya
- Miyoko Hirose
- Kyoko Ishida
- Yoko Kagabu
- Norie Hiro
- Kayoko Sugiyama
- Sachiko Otani
- Keiko Miyajima
- Emiko Odaka
- Kumi Nakada

Head coach

- Shigeo Yamada

=== South Korea ===
- Lee Eun-Kyung
- Lee Un-im
- Jin Chun-Mae
- Lee Yeong-seon
- Kim Jeong-sun
- Jae Sook-Ja
- Han Gyeong-ae
- Lee Myeong-hui
- Kim Ok-sun
- Park Mi-hui
- Im Hye-suk
- Yun Jeong-hye

Head coach

- Lee Chang-ho

=== Peru ===
- Carmen Pimentel
- Ana Chaparro
- Rosa García
- Sonia Heredia
- Gaby Pérez
- María del Risco
- Cecilia Tait
- Luisa Cervera
- Denisse Fajardo
- Miriam Gallardo
- Gina Torrealva
- Natalia Málaga

Head coach

- Park Man-Bok
