= Japan at the 1984 Summer Olympics =

- IOC code: JPN
- NOC: Japanese Olympic Committee

in Los Angeles
- Competitors: 226 (174 men and 52 women) in 22 sports
- Flag bearer: Shigenobu Murofushi
- Medals Ranked 7th: Gold 10 Silver 8 Bronze 14 Total 32

Summer Olympics appearances (overview)
- 1912; 1920; 1924; 1928; 1932; 1936; 1948; 1952; 1956; 1960; 1964; 1968; 1972; 1976; 1980; 1984; 1988; 1992; 1996; 2000; 2004; 2008; 2012; 2016; 2020; 2024

Japan competed at the 1984 Summer Olympics in Los Angeles, United States. Japan returned to the Games after participating in the American-led boycott of the 1980 Summer Olympics. 226 competitors, 174 men and 52 women, took part in 147 events in 22 sports.

== Medalists ==
Medal	Name	Sport	Event	Date
Gold	Kōji Gushiken	Gymnastics	Men's individual all-around	August 2
Gold	Takeo Kamachi	Shooting	Men's rapid fire pistol	August 2
Gold	Atsuji Miyahara	Wrestling	Men's Greco-Roman flyweight	August 2
Gold	Shinji Morisue	Gymnastics	Men's horizontal bar	August 4
Gold	Kōji Gushiken	Gymnastics	Men's rings	August 4
Gold	Shinji Hosokawa	Judo	Men extra lightweight	August 4
Gold	Yoshiyuki Matsuoka	Judo	Men half lightweight	August 5
Gold	Hitoshi Saito	Judo	Men heavyweight	August 10
Gold	Yasuhiro Yamashita	Judo	Men's open category	August 11
Gold	Hideaki Tomiyama	Wrestling	Men's freestyle bantamweight	August 11
Silver	Masaki Eto	Wrestling	Men's Greco-Roman bantamweight	August 3
Silver	Nobuyuki Kajitani	Gymnastics	Men's parallel bars	August 4
Silver	Kōji Gushiken	Gymnastics	Men's vault	August 4
Silver	Shinji Morisue	Gymnastics	Men's vault	August 4
Silver	Takashi Irie	Wrestling	Men's freestyle light flyweight	August 9
Silver	Kosei Akaishi	Wrestling	Men's freestyle featherweight	August 9
Silver	Akira Ota	Wrestling	Men's freestyle light heavyweight	August 9
Silver	Hideyuki Nagashima	Wrestling	Men's freestyle middleweight	August 11
Bronze	Kazushito Manabe	Weightlifting	Men's flyweight	July 29
Bronze	Masahiro Kotaka	Weightlifting	Men's bantamweight	July 30
Bronze	Kōji Gushiken; Noritoshi Hirata; Nobuyuki Kajitani; Shinji Morisue; Koji Sotomura; Kyoji Yamawaki	Gymnastics	Men's team all-around	July 31
Bronze	Ikuzo Saito	Wrestling	Men's Greco-Roman light flyweight	August 1
Bronze	Tsutomu Sakamoto	Cycling	Men's sprint	August 3
Bronze	Koji Sotomura	Gymnastics	Men's floor	August 4
Bronze	Kōji Gushiken	Gymnastics	Men's horizontal bar	August 4
Bronze	Ryoji Isaoka	Weightlifting	Men's light heavyweight	August 4
Bronze	Yumi Egami; Norie Hiro; Miyoko Hirose; Kyoko Ishida; Yoko Kagabu; Yuko Mitsuya; Keiko Miyajima; Kimie Morita; Kumi Nakada; Emiko Odaka; Sachiko Otani; Kayoko Sugiyama	Volleyball	Women's tournament	August 7
Bronze	Seiki Nose	Judo	Men's middleweight	August 8
Bronze	Saeko Kimura; Miwako Motoyoshi	Artistic swimming	Women's duet	August 9
Bronze	Yuji Takada	Wrestling	Men's freestyle light flyweight	August 10
Bronze	Hiroshi Yamamoto	Archery	Men's individual	August 11
Bronze	Miwako Motoyoshi	Artistic swimming	Women's solo	August 12

Medals by sport
Sport	1st place, gold medalist(s)	2nd place, silver medalist(s)	3rd place, bronze medalist(s)	Total
Judo	4	0	1	5
Gymnastics	3	3	3	9
Wrestling	2	5	2	9
Shooting	1	0	0	1
Weightlifting	0	0	3	3
Artistic swimming	0	0	2	2
Archery	0	0	1	1
Cycling	0	0	1	1
Volleyball	0	0	1	1
Total	10	8	14	32

== Archery ==
In their third Olympic archery competition, Japan won a bronze medal in the men's division as well as having a fourth place competitor in each division.

Women's Individual Competition:

- Hiroko Ishizu – 2525 points (4th place)
- Minako Hokari – 2481 points (10th place)

Men's Individual Competition:

- Hiroshi Yamamoto – 2563 points (Bronze Medal)
- Takayoshi Matsushita – 2552 points (4th place)
- Ichiro Shimamura – 2312 points (52nd place)

== Athletics ==
Men's 400 metres

- Susumu Takana

- Heat — 46.26
- Quarterfinals — 45.91
- Semifinals — 45.88 (→ did not advance)

Men's 10,000 metres

- Yutaka Kanai

- Qualifying Heat — 28:14.67
- Final — 28:27.06 (→ 7th place)

- Masanari Shintaku

- Qualifying Heat — 28:24.30
- Final — 28:55.54 (→ 16th place)

Men's Marathon

- Takeshi So

- Final — 2:10:55 (→ 4th place)

- Toshihiko Seko

- Final — 2:14:13 (→ 14th place)

- Shigeru So

- Final — 2:14:38 (→ 17th place)

Men's Long Jump

- Junichi Usui

- Qualification — 8.02m
- Final — 7.87m (→ 7th place)

Men's High Jump

- Takao Sakamoto

- Qualification — 2.21m (→ did not advance)

Men's Javelin Throw

- Masami Yoshida

- Qualification — 81.42m
- Final — 81.98m (→ 5th place)

- Kazuhiro Mizoguchi

- Qualification — 74.82m (→ did not advance, 20th place)

Men's Hammer Throw

- Shigenobu Murofushi

- Qualification — 70.92m (→ did not advance)

Men's Pole Vault

- Tomomi Takahashi

- Qualifying Round — 5.30m
- Final — no mark (→ no ranking)

Women's Marathon

- Nanae Sasaki

- Final — 2:37:04 (→ 19th place)

- Akemi Masuda

- Final — did not finish (→ no ranking)

Women's High Jump

- Hisayo Fukumitsu

- Qualification — 1.87m (→ did not advance, 17th place)

- Megumi Sato

- Qualification — 1.84m (→ did not advance, 18th place)

Women's Javelin Throw

- Emi Matsui

- Qualification — 57.72m (→ did not advance)

- Minori Mori

- Qualification — 56.60m (→ did not advance)

== Boxing ==
Men's Light Flyweight (– 48 kg)

- Mamoru Kuroiwa
  1. First Round — Bye
  2. Second Round — Defeated Francisco Tejedor (COL), 4:1
  3. Quarterfinals — Lost to Keith Mwila (KEN), 0:5

Men's Bantamweight (– 54 kg)

- Hiroaki Takami
  1. First Round — Bye
  2. Second Round — Defeated Gamaleldin El-Koumy (EGY), 4:1
  3. Third Round — Lost to Dale Walters (CAN), 0:5

== Cycling ==
Nine cyclists, eight men and one woman, represented Japan in 1984. Tsutomu Sakamoto won a bronze medal in the sprint event.

Men's individual road race

- Matsuyoshi Takahashi — 45th place

Sprint

- Tsutomu Sakamoto
- Katsuo Nakatake

1000m time trial

- Tsutomu Sakamoto

Team pursuit

- Akio Kuwazawa
- Harumitsu Okada
- Mitsugi Sarudate
- Yoshihiro Tsumuraya

Points race

- Akio Kuwazawa
- Hitoshi Sato

Women's individual road race

- Wakako Abe — 40th place

== Diving ==
Men's 3m Springboard

- Isao Yamagishi

- Preliminary Round — 427.14 (→ did not advance, 25th place)

== Fencing ==
Nine fencers, five men and four women, represented Japan in 1984.

Men's foil

- Kenichi Umezawa
- Nobuyuki Azuma
- Tadashi Shimokawa

Men's team foil

- Nobuyuki Azuma, Yoshihiko Kanatsu, Hidehachi Koyasu, Tadashi Shimokawa, Kenichi Umezawa

Women's foil

- Azusa Oikawa
- Mieko Miyahara
- Miyuki Maekawa

Women's team foil

- Mieko Miyahara, Azusa Oikawa, Miyuki Maekawa, Tomoko Oka

== Handball ==
Men's Team Competition

- Preliminary Round (Group A)

- Lost to Yugoslavia (15:32)
- Lost to Romania (22:28)
- Lost to Iceland (17:21)
- Lost to Switzerland (13:20)
- Defeated Algeria (17:16)

- Classification Match

- 9th/10th place: Lost to United States (16:24) → 10th place

- Team Roster

- Seimei Gamo
- Takashi Ikenoue
- Yasou Ikona
- Hidetada Ito
- Koji Matsui
- Mitsuaki Nakamoto
- Kiyoshi Nishiyama
- Takahiro Ohata
- Nobuo Sasaki
- Kenzo Seki
- Yoshihiro Shiga
- Katsutoshi Taguchi
- Seiichi Takamura
- Yukihiko Uemura
- Shinji Yamamoto

== Modern pentathlon ==
Three male pentathletes represented Japan in 1984.

Individual

- Shoji Uchida
- Hiroyuki Kawazoe
- Daizou Araki

Team

- Shoji Uchida
- Hiroyuki Kawazoe
- Daizou Araki

== Shooting ==
Men

Athlete	Event	Final	
Athlete	Event	Points	Rank
Hiroyuki Akatsuka	25 m rapid fire pistol	583	23
Norito Chosa	50 m rifle, prone	585	43
Chikafumi Hirai	50 m pistol	551	18
Takeo Kamachi	25 m rapid fire pistol	595	Gold medal
Ryohei Koba	50 m rifle, three positions	1137	25
Ryohei Koba	10 m air rifle	578	18
Kaoru Matsuo	50 m rifle, three positions	1125	35
Hiroyuki Nakajo	50 m rifle, prone	591	17
Shigetoshi Tashiro	50 m pistol	540	29

Women

Athlete	Event	Final	
Athlete	Event	Points	Rank
Keiko Hirakawa	25 m pistol	564	23
Noriko Kosai	50 m rifle, three positions	568	11
Noriko Kosai	10 m air rifle	383	10
Atsuko Sugimoto	25 m pistol	564	23

Open

Athlete	Event	Final	
Athlete	Event	Points	Rank
Eigen Hayashi	Skeet	184	41
Motoharu Hirano	Trap	186	11
Mikio Itakura	Skeet	192	13
Kazumi Watanabe	Trap	186	13

== Swimming ==
Men's 100m Freestyle

- Shigeo Ogata

- Heat — 52.96 (→ did not advance, 33rd place)

- Satoshi Sumida

- Heat — 53.83 (→ did not advance, 39th place)

Men's 200m Freestyle

- Hiroshi Sakamoto

- Heat — 1:54.71 (→ did not advance, 26th place)

- Shigeo Ogata

- Heat — 1:55.97 (→ did not advance, 33rd place)

Men's 400m Freestyle

- Shigeo Ogata

- Heat — 4:02.97 (→ did not advance, 22nd place)

- Keisuke Okuno

- Heat — 4:06.31 (→ did not advance, 27th place)

Men's 100m Backstroke

- Daichi Suzuki

- Heat — 58.37
- B-Final — 58.30 (→ 11th place)

Men's 200m Backstroke

- Daichi Suzuki

- Heat — 2:06.24
- B-Final — 2:06.02 (→ 16th place)

Men's 100m Breaststroke

- Shigehiro Takahashi

- Heat — 1:04.71
- B-Final — 1:04.41 (→ 10th place)

- Kenji Watanabe

- Heat — 1:06.10 (→ did not advance, 9th place)

Men's 200m Breaststroke

- Shigehiro Takahashi

- Heat — 2:19.98
- B-Final — 2:20.93 (→ 12th place)

- Kenji Watanabe

- Heat — 2:22.33
- B-Final — 2:22.29 (→ 15th place)

Men's 100m Butterfly

- Taihei Saka

- Heat — 56.40 (→ did not advance, 21st place)

- Shudo Kawawa

- Heat — 56.52 (→ did not advance, 23rd place)

Men's 200m Butterfly

- Taihei Saka

- Heat — 2:00.66
- B-Final — 2:00.31 (→ 9th place)

- Shudo Kawawa

- Heat — 2:03.07 (→ did not advance, 18th place)

Men's 200m Individual Medley

- Shinji Ito

- Heat — 2:07.76
- B-Final — 2:06.07 (→ 10th place)

Men's 400m Individual Medley

- Shinji Ito

- Heat — 4:30.52
- B-Final — 4:29.76 (→ 13th place)

Men's 4 × 100 m Freestyle Relay

- Hiroshi Sakamoto, Shigeo Ogata, Taihei Saka, and Satoshi Sumida

- Heat — 3:30.45 (→ did not advance, 13th place)

Men's 4 × 200 m Freestyle Relay

- Taihei Saka, Hiroshi Sakamoto, Keisuke Okuno, and Shigeo Ogata

- Heat — DSQ (→ did not advance, no ranking)

Men's 4 × 100 m Medley Relay

- Daichi Suzuki, Shigehiro Takahashi, Taihei Saka, and Hiroshi Sakamoto

- Heat — 3:50.14
- Final — DSQ (→ no ranking)

Women's 100m Freestyle

- Kaori Yanase

- Heat — 58.47 (→ did not advance, 17th place)

- Chikako Nakamori

- Heat — 59.00 (→ did not advance, 21st place)

Women's 200m Freestyle

- Chikako Nakamori

- Heat — 2:03.94
- B-Final — 2:04.11 (→ 13th place)

- Kaori Yanase

- Heat — 2:04.38
- B-Final — 2:05.24 (→ 16th place)

Women's 400m Freestyle

- Chikako Nakamori

- Heat — 4:20.13
- B-Final — 4:20.18 (→ 14th place)

- Junko Sakurai

- Heat — 4:28.68 (→ did not advance, 19th place)

Women's 800m Freestyle

- Junko Sakurai

- Heat — 9:13.27 (→ did not advance, 18th place)

Women's 4 × 100 m Freestyle Relay

- Junko Sakurai, Chikako Nakamori, Miki Saito, and Kaori Yanase

- Heat — 3:54.68 (→ did not advance)

Women's 4 × 100 m Medley Relay

- Naomi Sekido, Hiroko Nagasaki, Naoko Kume, and Kaori Yanase

- Heat — 4:17.59
- Final — DSQ (→ no ranking)

Women's 100m Backstroke

- Naomi Sekido

- Heat — 1:05.60 (→ did not advance, 18th place)

- Nozomi Sunouchi

- Heat — 1:07.23 (→ did not advance, 23rd place)

Women's 200m Backstroke

- Naomi Sekido

- Heat — 2:18.52
- B-Final — 2:18.87 (→ 14th place)

- Nozomi Sunouchi

- Heat — 2:25.05 (→ did not advance, 22nd place)

Women's 200m Butterfly

- Naoko Kume

- Heat — 2:13.31
- Final — 2:12.57 (→ 6th place)

- Kiyomi Takahashi

- Heat — 2:14.37
- B-Final — 2:16.27 (→ 12th place)

Women's 200m Individual Medley

- Hideka Koshimizu

- Heat — 2:23.38
- B-Final — 2:22.81 (→ 15th place)

Women's 400m Individual Medley

- Hideka Koshimizu

- Heat — 4:59.18
- B-Final — 4:58.02 (→ 14th place)

== Volleyball ==
Men's Team Competition

- Preliminary Round (Group B)

- Defeated China (3-0)
- Defeated Italy (3-2)
- Defeated Egypt (3-0)
- Lost to Canada (0-3)

- Classification Matches

- 5th/8th place: Lost to Argentina (1-3)
- 7th/8th place: Defeated China (3-0) → 7th place

- Team Roster

- Koshi Sobu
- Eiji Shimomura
- Kazuya Mitake
- Eizaburo Mitsuhashi
- Hiroaki Okuno
- Yasushi Furukawa
- Shuji Yamada
- Mikiyasu Tanaka
- Kimio Sugimoto
- Minoru Iwata
- Akihiro Iwashima
- Shunichi Kawai

Women's Team Competition

- Preliminary Round (Group A)

- Defeated South Korea (3-1)
- Defeated Peru (3-0)
- Defeated Canada (3-0)

- Semi Finals

- Lost to China (0-3)

- Bronze Medal Match

- Defeated United States (3-1) → Bronze Medal

- Team Roster

- Yumi Egami
- Kimie Morita
- Yuko Mitsuya
- Miyoko Hirose
- Kyoko Ishida
- Yoko Kagabu
- Norie Hiro
- Kayoko Sugiiyama
- Sachiko Otani
- Keiko Miyajima
- Emiko Odaka
- Kumie Nakada

== Water polo ==
Men's Team Competition

- Preliminary Round (Group C)

- Lost to Italy (5-15)
- Lost to West Germany (8-15)
- Lost to Australia (2-15)

- Final Round (Group E)

- Lost to China (4-10)
- Lost to Greece (7-14)
- Lost to Canada (5-8)
- Defeated Brazil (9-8) → 11th place

- Team Roster

- Etsuji Fujita
- Yoshifumi Saito
- Koshi Fujimori
- Shingo Kai
- Narihito Taima
- Daisuke Houki
- Toshio Fukumoto
- Toshiyuki Miyahara
- Hisayoshi Nagata
- Koji Wakayoshi
- Hisaharu Saito
- Shinji Yamasaki
- Asami Oura
