= Volleyball at the 1982 Asian Games =

- Venue: Indraprashtha Indoor Stadium
- Dates: 20 November – 3 December 1982
- Nations: 17

Volleyball events were contested at the 1982 Asian Games in New Delhi, India.

== Medalists ==
Event	Gold	Silver	Bronze
Men	Japan; Yukimitsu Fujita; Yasushi Furukawa; Haruhiko Hanawa; Minoru Iwata; Kazuya Mitake; Eizaburo Mitsuhashi; Hiroaki Okuno; Koshi Sobu; Kimio Sugimoto; Mikiyasu Tanaka; Naoki Tanaka; Shuji Yamada	China; Cao Ping; Chen Fulin; Chen Gang; Guo Ming; Hou Xiaofei; Hu Jin; Pan Lijun; Wang Jiawei; Wang Tieshan; Xu Zhen; Xue Yongye; Yu Yansen	South Korea; Chang Yoon-chang; Han Jang-sok; Kang Doo-tae; Kang Man-soo; Kim Hyung-tae; Kim In-ok; Kim Kyung-un; Kim Sang-bo; Lee Bum-joo; Lee Jong-kyung; Moon Yong-kwan; Yoo Joong-tak
Women	China; Cao Huiying; Chen Yaqiong; Chen Zhaodi; Jiang Ying; Lang Ping; Liang Yan; Sun Jinfang; Yang Xi; Yang Xilan; Zhang Rongfang; Zheng Meizhu; Zhou Xiaolan	Japan; Yumi Egami; Yayumi Hara; Miyoko Hirose; Kyoko Ishida; Yuko Mitsuya; Kimie Morita; Kumi Nakada; Emiko Odaka; Noriko Ogihara; Kayoko Sugiyama; Hitomi Suzuki; Mikiko Wako	South Korea; Han Kyung-ae; Jeong Keum-sun; Jin Chun-mae; Kim Jeong-sun; Kim Song-eun; Kim Young-sook; Kwak Sun-ok; Lee Eun-kyung; Lee Un-yim; Lee Young-sun; Nam Myung-ye; Park Mi-hee

== Medal table ==
Rank	Nation	Gold	Silver	Bronze	Total
1	China (CHN)	1	1	0	2
1	Japan (JPN)	1	1	0	2
3	South Korea (KOR)	0	0	2	2
Totals (3 entries)		2	2	2	6

== Draw ==
The men were seeded according to their position at the 1978 Asian Games.

Pool A

- India (Host)
- Saudi Arabia
- Indonesia
- Bangladesh

Pool B

- South Korea (1)
- Kuwait
- Nepal

Pool C

- Japan (2)
- Hong Kong
- Qatar
- South Yemen

Pool D

- China (3)
- Iraq
- North Yemen
- Maldives

== Final standing ==
=== Men ===
Rank	Team	Pld	W	L
1st place, gold medalist(s)	Japan	6	6	0
2nd place, silver medalist(s)	China	6	5	1
3rd place, bronze medalist(s)	South Korea	5	3	2
4	India	6	3	3
5	Iraq	6	5	1
6	Indonesia	6	4	2
7	Kuwait	5	2	3
8	Qatar	6	2	4
9	Saudi Arabia	6	4	2
10	South Yemen	6	3	3
11	North Yemen	6	2	4
12	Nepal	5	0	5
13	Bangladesh	5	2	3
14	Hong Kong	5	1	4
15	Maldives	5	0	5

=== Women ===
Rank	Team	Pld	W	L
1st place, gold medalist(s)	China	5	5	0
2nd place, silver medalist(s)	Japan	5	4	1
3rd place, bronze medalist(s)	South Korea	5	3	2
4	North Korea	5	2	3
5	Philippines	5	1	4
6	India	5	0	5
