= Volleyball at the 1986 Asian Games =

- Venue: Hanyang University Gymnasium
- Dates: 21 September – 4 October 1986
- Nations: 12

Volleyball events were contested at the 1986 Asian Games at Hanyang University Gymnasium in Seoul, South Korea from 21 September to 4 October 1986.

== Medalists ==
Event	Gold	Silver	Bronze
Men	China; Jiang Jie; Ju Genyin; Liu Changcheng; Lu Cheng; Ma Jun; Song Jinwei; Wang Jiawei; Yang Liqun; Yu Yiqing; Zhang Renjiang; Zhao Duo; Zuo Yue	South Korea; Chang Yoon-chang; Choi Cheon-sik; Han Jang-sok; Kang Doo-tae; Kim Ho-chul; Lee Chae-on; Lee Jong-kyung; Moon Yong-kwan; Nam Sang-sun; No Jin-su; Yoo Joong-tak; Yang Jin-wung	India; Abdul Basith; Jimmy George; Shaikh Kareemullah; Kirtesh Kumar; P. V. Ramana; Dalel Singh Ror; Sandeep Sharma; Mehar Singh; Sukhpal Singh; G. E. Sridharan; K. Udayakumar; Cyril C. Valloor
Women	China; Hou Yuzhu; Hu Xiaofeng; Jiang Ying; Li Yanjun; Liang Yan; Liu Wei; Su Huijuan; Wu Dan; Yang Xilan; Yang Xiaojun; Yin Qin; Zheng Meizhu	Japan; Norie Hiro; Tomoe Hongo; Naomi Masuko; Midori Matsuzawa; Keiko Miyajima; Kumi Nakada; Hiromi Ono; Sachiko Otani; Kazue Otokozawa; Ichiko Sato; Shihoko Sato; Kazumi Umezu	South Korea; Jea Sook-ja; Ji Kyung-hee; Kim Jeong-sun; Kim Kyung-hee; Kwak Sun-ok; Lee Eun-kyung; Lee Myung-hee; Lee Un-yim; Lee Young-sun; Lim Hye-sook; Sun Mi-sook; Yoo Ae-ja

== Medal table ==
Rank	Nation	Gold	Silver	Bronze	Total
1	China (CHN)	2	0	0	2
2	South Korea (KOR)	0	1	1	2
3	Japan (JPN)	0	1	0	1
4	India (IND)	0	0	1	1
Totals (4 entries)		2	2	2	6

== Final standing ==
=== Men ===
Rank	Team	Pld	W	L
1st place, gold medalist(s)	China	8	8	0
2nd place, silver medalist(s)	South Korea	8	7	1
3rd place, bronze medalist(s)	India	8	5	3
4	Japan	8	4	4
5	Saudi Arabia	8	5	3
6	Kuwait	8	5	3
7	Bahrain	8	3	5
8	Pakistan	8	3	5
9	Thailand	8	4	4
10	Indonesia	8	3	5
11	Hong Kong	8	1	7
12	Nepal	8	0	8

=== Women ===
Rank	Team	Pld	W	L
1st place, gold medalist(s)	China	4	4	0
2nd place, silver medalist(s)	Japan	4	3	1
3rd place, bronze medalist(s)	South Korea	4	2	2
4	Thailand	4	1	3
5	Indonesia	4	0	4
