= Volleyball at the 1984 Summer Olympics – Women's tournament =

Women's volleyball at the Games of the XXIII Olympiad
- Venue: Long Beach Arena
- Date: 30 July – 7 August
- Competitors: 96 from 8 nations

Medalists
1st place, gold medalist(s)		China (1st title)
2nd place, silver medalist(s)		United States
3rd place, bronze medalist(s)		Japan

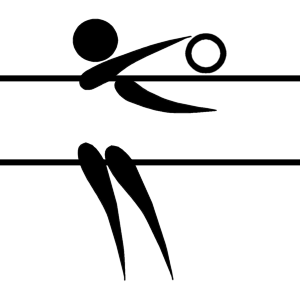

The 1984 Women's Olympic Volleyball Tournament was the 6th edition of the event, organized by the world's governing body, the FIVB in conjunction with the IOC. It was held in Long Beach, California, United States from July 30 to August 7, 1984.

== Competition schedule ==
P	Preliminary round	½	Semi-finals	B	Bronze medal match	F	Gold medal match

Mon 30	Tue 31	Wed 1	Thu 2	Fri 3	Sat 4	Sun 5	Mon 6	Tue 7
P		P		P		½	B	F

== Qualification ==
Qualifiers	Date	Host	Vacancies	Qualified
Host country	18 May 1978	(Greece) Athens	1	United States
1980 Summer Olympic Games	21–29 July 1980	(Soviet Union) Moscow	1	~~Soviet Union~~
1982 World Championship	12–25 September 1982	(Peru) Lima	1	China
1983 NORCECA Championship	12–16 July 1983	(United States) Indianapolis	1	~~Cuba~~ Canada*
1983 South American Championship	2–6 August 1983	(Brazil) São Paulo	1	Peru
1983 European Championship	17–25 September 1983	(East Germany) Rostock	1	~~East Germany~~ West Germany
1983 Asian Championship	10–17 November 1983	(Japan) Fukuoka	1	Japan
Wild cards	–	–	2	Brazil*
Wild cards	–	–	2	South Korea*
Total			8	

* Notes:

1. Cuba was the 1983 NORCECA Championship runners-up (champions United States, were already qualified as hosts), but together with East Germany (1983 European champion), Soviet Union (1980 Olympic champion) and other countries, boycotted the games.
2. Canada, South Korea and West Germany replaced Cuba, East Germany and the Soviet Union.
3. In a change in the classification process, the best team in the FIVB ranking that had not qualified for the Games would gain a spot in the tournament. In this way, the remaining place went to South Korea; however, with the boycott there was another place left and it was reassigned to the second best non-qualifier, which was Brazil.

== Format ==
The tournament was played in two different stages. In the Preliminary round (first stage), the eight participants were divided into two pools of four teams. A single round-robin format was played within each pool to determine the teams position in the pool. The Final round (second stage) was played in a single elimination format, where the preliminary round two highest ranked teams in each group advanced to the semifinals and the two lowest ranked teams advanced to the 5th–8th place semifinals.

== Pools composition ==
Pool A	Pool B
United States	Japan
China	South Korea
Brazil	Canada
West Germany	Peru

== Venues ==
- Long Beach Arena, Long Beach, California, United States

== Preliminary round ==
=== Group A ===
Pos	Team	Pld	W	L	Pts	SW	SL	SR	SPW	SPL	SPR	Qualification
1	United States	3	3	0	6	9	3	3.000	167	139	1.201	1st–4th semifinals
2	China	3	2	1	5	7	3	2.333	144	101	1.426	1st–4th semifinals
3	West Germany	3	1	2	4	3	6	0.500	93	126	0.738	5th–8th semifinals
4	Brazil	3	0	3	3	2	9	0.222	120	158	0.759	5th–8th semifinals

Date		Score		Set 1	Set 2	Set 3	Set 4	Set 5	Total	Report
30 Jul	China	3–0	Brazil	15–13	15–10	15–11			45–34	Report
30 Jul	United States	3–0	West Germany	17–15	15–8	15–10			47–33	Report
1 Aug	West Germany	0–3	China	5–15	6–15	3–15			14–45	Report
1 Aug	United States	3–2	Brazil	12–15	10–15	15–5	15–5	15–12	67–52	Report
3 Aug	Brazil	0–3	West Germany	9–15	14–16	11–15			34–46	Report
3 Aug	China	1–3	United States	13–15	15–7	14–16	12–15		54–53	Report

=== Group B ===
Pos	Team	Pld	W	L	Pts	SW	SL	SR	SPW	SPL	SPR	Qualification
1	Japan	3	3	0	6	9	1	9.000	143	73	1.959	1st–4th semifinals
2	Peru	3	2	1	5	6	5	1.200	123	125	0.984	1st–4th semifinals
3	South Korea	3	1	2	4	6	6	1.000	137	125	1.096	5th–8th semifinals
4	Canada	3	0	3	3	0	9	0.000	55	135	0.407	5th–8th semifinals

Date		Score		Set 1	Set 2	Set 3	Set 4	Set 5	Total	Report
30 Jul	Peru	3–0	Canada	15–9	15–10	15–4			45–23	Report
30 Jul	Japan	3–1	South Korea	8–15	15–11	15–2	15–7		53–35	Report
1 Aug	Canada	0–3	South Korea	10–15	1–15	3–15			14–45	Report
1 Aug	Japan	3–0	Peru	15–8	15–7	15–5			45–20	Report
3 Aug	Peru	3–2	South Korea	15–8	15–6	7–15	6–15	15–13	58–57	Report
3 Aug	Japan	3–0	Canada	15–6	15–6	15–6			45–18	Report

== Final round ==
=== 5th to 8th place ===
Semifinals
5 August
South Korea	3
Brazil	1
5 August
Canada	0
West Germany	3

5th place
7 August
South Korea	3
West Germany	0
7th place
7 August
Canada	0
Brazil	3

==== 5th–8th place semifinals ====
Date		Score		Set 1	Set 2	Set 3	Set 4	Set 5	Total	Report
5 Aug	South Korea	3–1	Brazil	13–15	15–13	15–9	15–10		58–47	Report
5 Aug	Canada	0–3	West Germany	5–15	7–15	1–15			13–45	Report

==== 7th place match ====
Date		Score		Set 1	Set 2	Set 3	Set 4	Set 5	Total	Report
7 Aug	Canada	0–3	Brazil	9–15	3–15	8–15			20–45	Report

==== 5th place match ====
Date		Score		Set 1	Set 2	Set 3	Set 4	Set 5	Total	Report
7 Aug	South Korea	3–0	West Germany	15–10	15–10	15–2			45–22	Report

=== Final ===
Semifinals
5 August
Japan	0
China	3
5 August
Peru	0
United States	3

Gold medal match
7 August
China	3
United States	0
Bronze medal match
7 August
Japan	3
Peru	1

==== Semifinals ====
Date		Score		Set 1	Set 2	Set 3	Set 4	Set 5	Total	Report
5 Aug	Peru	0–3	United States	14–16	9–15	10–15			33–46	Report
5 Aug	Japan	0–3	China	10–15	7–15	4–15			21–45	Report

==== Bronze medal match ====
Date		Score		Set 1	Set 2	Set 3	Set 4	Set 5	Total	Report
7 Aug	Japan	3–1	Peru	13–15	15–4	15–7	15–10		58–36	Report

==== Gold medal match ====
Date		Score		Set 1	Set 2	Set 3	Set 4	Set 5	Total	Report
7 Aug	China	3–0	United States	16–14	15–3	15–9			46–26	Report

== Final standing ==
Rank	Team
1st place, gold medalist(s)	China
2nd place, silver medalist(s)	United States
3rd place, bronze medalist(s)	Japan
4	Peru
5	South Korea
6	West Germany
7	Brazil
8	Canada

1984 Women's Olympic champions

China
1st title

12-woman roster
Lang Ping, Liang Yan, Zhu Ling, Hou Yuzhu, Yang Xilan, Jiang Ying, Li Yanjun, Yang Xiaojun, Zheng Meizhu, Zhang Rongfang (c), Su Huijuan, Zhou Xiaolan
Head coach
Yuan Weimin

== Medalists ==
Gold	Silver	Bronze
China Lang Ping; Liang Yan; Zhu Ling; Hou Yuzhu; Yang Xilan; Jiang Ying; Li Yanjun; Yang Xiaojun; Zheng Meizhu; Zhang Rongfang (c); Su Huijuan; Zhou Xiaolan Head coach: Yuan Weimin	United States Paula Weishoff; Sue Woodstra (c); Rita Crockett; Laurie Flachmeier; Carolyn Becker; Flo Hyman; Rose Magers; Julie Vollertsen; Debbie Green-Vargas; Kimberley Ruddins; Jeanne Beauprey; Linda Chisholm Head coach: Arie Selinger	Japan Yumi Egami (c); Kimie Morita; Yuko Mitsuya; Miyoko Hirose; Kyoko Ishida; Yoko Kagabu; Norie Hiro; Kayoko Sugiyama; Sachiko Otani; Keiko Miyajima; Emiko Odaka; Kumi Nakada Head coach: Shigeo Yamada

== Awards ==
- Most valuable player
  Lang Ping (CHN)
- Best scorer
  Isabel Salgado (BRA)
- Best spiker
  Julie Vollertsen (USA)
- Best blocker
  Rose Magers (USA)
- Best receiver
  Heloisa Roese (BRA)
- Best server
  Meizhu Zheng (CHN)

== See also ==
- Volleyball at the Summer Olympics
- Volleyball at the 1984 Summer Olympics – Men's tournament

China's first-ever Olympic volleyball title was commemorated in the following movies:

- My People, My Country: 2019 Chinese film
- Leap: 2020 Chinese film
