= Shudo =

Shudo may refer to

- Shudo (surname)
- A term related to homosexuality in Japan
- Hiroshima Shudo University in Japan
- Shudo Junior and Senior High School in Hiroshima, Japan
