= Hiroaki Okuno =

Hiroaki Okuno may refer to:

- Hiroaki Okuno (volleyball) (奥野 浩昭, born 1960), Japanese volleyball player
- Hiroaki Okuno (footballer) (奥埜 博亮, born 1989), Japanese football player
