= Pusarla =

Pusarla (Telugu: పూసర్ల) is a Telugu surname. Notable people with the surname include:

- Pusarla Venkata Sindhu (born 1995), Indian badminton player
- Pusarla Venkata Ramana, Indian volleyball player
