= Julie Vollertsen =

American volleyball player

Personal information
- Nationality: American / Italian
- Born: Julie Jo Vollertsen; March 1, 1959 (age 67); Syracuse, Nebraska, U.S.
- Height: 6 ft 0 in (184 cm)
- Weight: 161 lb (73 kg)

Volleyball information
- Position: Outside hitter
- Number: 9

Career
Years	Teams
1984–1988	Nelsen Reggio Emilia

National team
1977–1984	United States
Medal record
Women's volleyball
Representing the United States
Olympic Games
Silver medal – second place	1984 Los Angeles	Team
World Championship
Bronze medal – third place	1982 Peru
Pan American Games
Silver medal – second place	1983 Caracas	Team

Julie Jo Vollertsen Melli (born March 1, 1959, in Syracuse, Nebraska) is an American former female professional volleyball player. Her main achievement is her part in the silver medal won by the United States at the 1984 Summer Olympic Games. She later moved to Italy to play professionally, settling in Reggio Emilia where she stayed after ending her playing career.

== Career ==
=== Palmyra High School ===
The Nebraskan led the Palmyra High School volleyball team to their first appearance in the state tournament, earning Sunday Journal and Star All-State honors. Graduating in 1977, she was later inducted into the Nebraska High School Sports Hall of Fame (in 1994).

=== Team USA ===
Straight out of high school, Vollertsen travelled to California to take part in a six-week tryout for the women's junior national volleyball team, she ended up being the only one to be kept on the team. She progressed up to the senior United States national team, being chosen as an alternate for the 1980 Moscow Olympics, but the US did not go due to the 1980 Summer Olympics boycott.

Vollertsen was a part of a volleyball program that, since 1975, regrouped the national team players (of which she was the only one not from California or Texas) in Coto de Caza, California where they trained and lived together relentlessly under coach Arie Selinger. In effect, they constituted an organised team (though all amateurs, receiving only expenses) that played in as many tournaments worldwide as possible. Team US and Vollertsen won a bronze medal at the 1982 World Championship, losing to hosts Peru in three games. They added a silver medal at the 1983 Pan American Games.

She served the winning point in the 1983 NORCECA Women's Volleyball Championship title game against Cuba in which the US finished undefeated.

The main goal of all these efforts was the 1984 Los Angeles Olympics for which Team USA qualified as hosts. They started the competition with a 3–0 win against West Germany. The second game proved tougher, with opponents Brazil winning the first two sets. The United States then rallied to a 3–2 victory, with Vollertsen serving nine consecutive winning points in the fourth game after a 5-5. With the win, the team had already set the best ever Olympic record for the Women's National Volleyball Team, besting the solitary win obtained in 1964. In the third group game against world champions China, in which the already qualified teams were playing to avoid a semifinal matchup with Japan, she had a crucial impact off the bench, scoring points off serves and spikes as the US earned a 3–1 upset.

The semifinal against Peru was a rematch of the 1982 world championship, this time Team US were victors, with Vollertsen scoring two decisive serves to win the first game.

Meeting China again in the final, Vollertsen and the US could not repeat their earlier victory and were beaten 3–0. Their silver medal was still a historic first medal for any national volleyball team (the Men's side would win a gold medal a few days later).

=== Reggio Emilia ===
Vollertsen moved to Italy after the tournament, joining professional side Nelsen Reggio Emilia (in Italian) in 1984. She played four years with the side, being eliminated from title contention on three occasions by perennial champions Teodora Pallavolo Ravenna (in Italian). She did win a CEV Cup in 1986, adding an Italian cup later that same year. Vollertsen retired after the 1987–88 season.

== Post-playing career ==
After retiring as a player, she started a coaching career (with youth teams), which she ended in 1991, after the birth of her first child.

Vollertsen was incorporated into the Emilia Romagna provincial Olympic Committee in March 2009, as athlete representative on the board. She was elected vice-president later that year. In 2013, she was reappointed in the former role until 2016.

== Honors and achievements ==
=== Individual ===
- Sports Illustrated's 50 Greatest Sports Figures from Nebraska: #48 (selected: 1999)
- Nebraska High School Sports Hall of Fame: 1994

=== International ===
- Summer Olympics: 1984 Los Angeles Silver
- World Championship: 1982 Peru Bronze
- Pan American Games: 1983 Caracas Silver
- NORECA Championship: 1983 Indianapolis Gold

=== Club ===
- CEV Cup: 1986
- Italian Cup winner: 1986

== Personal ==
Vollertsen met Italian journalist Leopoldo Melli in Reggio Emilia when he interviewed her for a show. They would start dating soon after and were married in 1989. She later became an Italian citizen.

They have two children together, professional basketball player Nicolò Melli was born in 1991 and played for Reggio Emilia side Pallacanestro Reggiana, whilst Enrico, born in 1996, has also played basketball for that same team. As a family, they received the Premio Reverberi (Oscar del Basket) (in Italian) Champion award in 2014 for their contribution to sports.
