= Hisaharu =

- Gender: Male

Origin
- Origin: Japanese
- Meaning: Different meanings depending on the kanji used

Hisaharu (written: 久治) is a masculine Japanese given name. Notable people with the name include:

- Hisaharu Saito (斉藤 久治; born 1962), Japanese water polo player
- Hisaharu Satoh, Japanese bowls player
- Hisaharu Yasui (安井 久治; 1951–2015), Japanese judge
