= Kim Ok-sun =

South Korean volleyball player (born 1964)

Personal information
- Nationality: South Korean
- Born: 24 June 1964 (age 60)

Sport
- Sport: Volleyball

Kim Ok-sun (born 24 June 1964) is a South Korean volleyball player. She competed in the women's tournament at the 1984 Summer Olympics.
