= Caroline Côté =

Canadian volleyball player (born 1962)

Personal information
- Born: 17 July 1962 (age 62); Sherbrooke, Quebec, Canada

Sport
- Sport: Volleyball

Caroline Côté (born 17 July 1962) is a Canadian volleyball player. She competed in the women's tournament at the 1984 Summer Olympics.
