= Monica Hitchcock =

Canadian volleyball player (born 1958)

Personal information
- Born: 26 February 1958 (age 67); Plaster Rock, New Brunswick, Canada

Sport
- Sport: Volleyball

Monica Hitchcock (born 26 February 1958) is a Canadian volleyball player. She competed in the women's tournament at the 1984 Summer Olympics.
