= Joyce Gamborg =

Canadian volleyball player (born 1960)

Personal information
- Born: 28 November 1960 (age 64); Melville, Saskatchewan, Canada

Sport
- Sport: Volleyball

Joyce Gamborg (born 28 November 1960) is a Canadian volleyball player. She competed in the women's tournament at the 1984 Summer Olympics.
