= Mônica da Silva (volleyball) =

Brazilian volleyball player (born 1960)

Personal information
- Full name: Mônica Caetano da Silva
- Born: 9 August 1960 (age 65) Rio de Janeiro, Brazil
- Height: 1.81 m (5 ft 11 in)

Sport
- Sport: Volleyball
Medal record
Women's volleyball
Representing Brazil
Pan American Games
Bronze medal – third place	1979 Caguas	Team

Mônica da Silva (born 9 August 1960) is a Brazilian volleyball player. She competed in the women's tournament at the 1984 Summer Olympics.
