= Almut Kemperdick =

German volleyball player (born 1963)

Personal information
- Nationality: German
- Born: 11 May 1963 (age 61); Düsseldorf, West Germany (now Germany)

Sport
- Sport: Volleyball

Almut Kemperdick (born 11 May 1963) is a German volleyball player. She competed in the women's tournament at the 1984 Summer Olympics.
