= Karen Fraser (volleyball) =

Canadian volleyball player (born 1959)

Personal information
- Born: 4 December 1959 (age 65); Halifax, Nova Scotia, Canada

Sport
- Sport: Volleyball

Karen Fraser (born 4 December 1959) is a Canadian volleyball player. She competed in the women's tournament at the 1984 Summer Olympics.
