= Ute Hankers =

German volleyball player (born 1965)

Personal information
- Nationality: German
- Born: 21 February 1965 (age 60); Bad Iburg, West Germany (now Germany)
- Height: 175 cm (5 ft 9 in)

Sport
- Sport: Volleyball

Ute Hankers (born 21 February 1965) is a German former volleyball player. She competed in the women's tournament at the 1984 Summer Olympics.
