= Andrea Sauvigny =

German volleyball player (born 1960)

Personal information
- Nationality: German
- Born: 30 December 1960 (age 64); Freiburg im Breisgau, West Germany

Sport
- Sport: Volleyball

Andrea Sauvigny (born 30 December 1960) is a German volleyball player. She competed in the women's tournament at the 1984 Summer Olympics.
