= Paula Weishoff =

American volleyball player

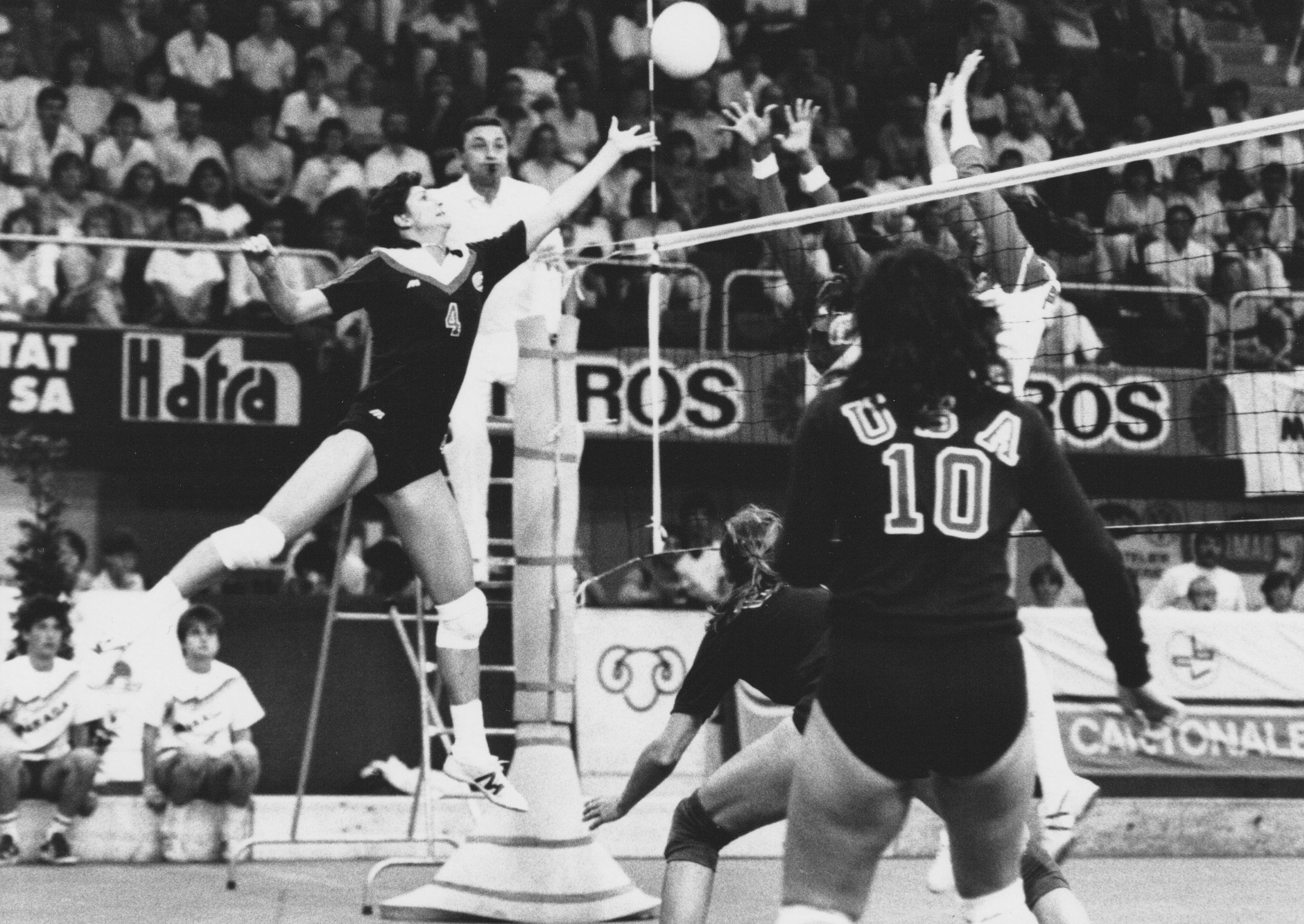

Personal information
- Born: Paula Jo Weishoff; May 1, 1962 (age 64); Hollywood, California, U.S.
- Height: 6 ft 1 in (1.85 m)
- Weight: 165 lb (75 kg)
- Education: University of Southern California

Volleyball information
- Position: Middle blocker
- Number: 1 (1984); 6 (1992); 3 (1996)

National team
1981–1996	United States
Medal record
Women's volleyball
Representing the United States
Olympic Games
Silver medal – second place	1984 Los Angeles	Team
Bronze medal – third place	1992 Barcelona	Team
World Championship
Bronze medal – third place	1982 Peru
FIVB World Grand Prix
Gold medal – first place	1995 Shanghai
Goodwill Games
Bronze medal – third place	1986 Moscow
Pan American Games
Silver medal – second place	1983 Caracas	Team

Paula Jo Weishoff (born May 1, 1962) is a retired female volleyball player from the United States and three-time Olympian who played with the United States women's national volleyball team. As a middle blocker, Weishoff won a silver medal at the 1984 Summer Olympics in Los Angeles and a bronze medal at the 1992 Summer Olympics in Barcelona, where she was named as the tournament's outstanding player. She also competed at the 1996 Summer Olympics in Atlanta.

While representing the United States, Weishoff won a bronze medal at the 1982 FIVB World Championship, a silver medal at the 1983 Pan American Games, a bronze medal at the 1986 Goodwill Games, and a gold medal at the 1995 FIVB World Grand Prix.

Weishoff was inducted into the International Volleyball Hall of Fame for her career achievements in 1998.

== College ==
In 1980, after graduating from West High School in Torrance, California, Weishoff played volleyball with the University of Southern California for one season. She helped her team win the NCAA Championship, and was selected as an All-American.

== International competitions ==
- 1981 – NORCECA (gold)
- 1982 – World Championship (bronze)
- 1983 – NORCECA (gold)
- 1983 – Pan American Games (silver)
- 1984 – Summer Olympics (silver)
- 1986 – Goodwill Games (bronze)
- 1986 – World Championship
- 1991 – NORCECA Championships (silver)
- 1991 – World Cup
- 1992 – Summer Olympics (bronze)
- 1992 – FIVB Super Four (bronze)
- 1995 – World Grand Prix (gold)
- 1996 – Summer Olympics (7th place)

== Coaching career ==
After retiring as a player, Weishoff became a volleyball coach. She was the head coach of the Concordia University women's volleyball team, and then transferred to the University of California, Irvine to coach the women's team.

Weishoff served under head coach Hugh McCutcheon of the United States women's national volleyball team for the 2012 Summer Olympics in London, as an assistant coach along with Karch Kiraly.

== Personal life ==
Weishoff is 6 ft 1 in (1.85 m). She was married to Karl Hanold.
