= Lise Martin =

Canadian volleyball player (born 1964)

Personal information
- Born: 21 January 1964 (age 61); Trois-Rivières, Quebec, Canada

Sport
- Sport: Volleyball

Lise Martin (born 21 January 1964) is a Canadian volleyball player. She competed in the women's tournament at the 1984 Summer Olympics.
