= Shudo (surname) =

Shudo or Shūdō is a Japanese surname that may refer to the following notable people:

- Shūdō Higashinakano (born 1947), Japanese historian
- Shudo Kawawa (born 1965), Japanese swimmer
- Shinichi Shudo (born 1965), Japanese handball player
- Takeshi Shudo (1949–2010), Japanese scriptwriter and novelist
