= Luiza Machado =

Brazilian volleyball player (born 1965)

Personal information
- Full name: Luiza Pinheiro Machado
- Born: 20 March 1965 (age 60); Belo Horizonte, Brazil
- Height: 1.75 m (5 ft 9 in)

Sport
- Sport: Volleyball

Luiza Machado (born 20 March 1965) is a Brazilian volleyball player. She competed in the women's tournament at the 1984 Summer Olympics.
