= Debbie Green-Vargas =

American volleyball player and coach (born 1958)

Personal information
- Full name: Deborah Green (-Vargas)
- Nationality: American
- Born: June 25, 1958 (age 68); Seoul, South Korea
- Height: 5 ft 4 in (163 cm)
- Education: University of Southern California

Volleyball information
- Position: Setter
- Number: 10

National team
1978–1984	United States
Medal record
Women's volleyball
Representing the United States
Olympic Games
Silver medal – second place	1984 Los Angeles	Team
World Championship
Bronze medal – third place	1982 Peru
Pan American Games
Silver medal – second place	1983 Caracas	Team

Debbie Green-Vargas (born June 25, 1958) is an American retired volleyball player and coach. She is regarded as the greatest American women's volleyball setter of all time. Green-Vargas was a member of the United States women's national volleyball team and won a silver medal at the 1984 Los Angeles Olympics.

Green-Vargas also won a bronze medal at the 1982 FIVB World Championship in Peru and a silver medal in the 1983 Pan American Games in Caracas.

In 1995, Green-Vargas was inducted into the International Volleyball Hall of Fame.

== Early life ==
Debbie Green-Vargas was born in Seoul, South Korea in 1958. She grew up in California and attended Westminster High School. At the age of 16 Green-Vargas was a part of the Adidas Junior Team which swept the USVBA Nationals. She was named an All-American, the youngest player ever to be so honored.

== Collegiate career ==
Despite her small stature, Green-Vargas was a two-time All-American setter at USC. She perfected the jump set, allowing her to meet the ball higher in the vertical plane and create a higher tempo in the offense. In doing so she was able to consistently create opportunities advantageous for her hitters. In 1977, Green-Vargas led the Trojans to a 38–0 record and an AIAW National Championships. Hers was the first college volleyball team to ever register a perfect season. Green-Vargas led the Trojans to their second national championship the following year in 1978. She won the Broderick Award, (now the Honda Sports Award) as the nation's best female collegiate volleyball player in 1978.

== Olympic career ==
Green-Vargas was on the roster for the 1980 Olympic, but was disappointed by the 1980 Olympic boycott. In 1984, Green-Vargas helped team USA to a silver medal, at the time the best finish in U.S. women's volleyball history.

== Professional ==
Green-Vargas played for the Los Angeles Starlites of Major League Volleyball (MLV), a women's professional indoor league, and helped the squad earn the league's first two championships in 1987 and 1988.

== Awards ==
In 1986, Green-Vargas was selected to the United States Volleyball Association Hall of Fame, and in the spring of 1986 received the All-Time Great Volleyball Player award. On April 30, 1998, Green-Vargas became the first woman to enter the Orange County Sports Hall of Fame.

== Coaching ==
Green-Vargas was an assistant coach for the Long Beach State women's volleyball team for 23 years, retiring after the 2008–09 season.

== Personal life ==
Green-Vargas married Joe Vargas and has two children, Nicole and Dana. Nicole played setter at Long Beach State, where Green-Vargas worked as an assistant coach. Dana was a setter for UCSB.
