= Regina Vossen =

German volleyball player (born 1962)

Personal information
- Nationality: German
- Born: 8 September 1962 (age 62); Berlin, Germany
- Height: 180 cm (5 ft 11 in)

Sport
- Sport: Volleyball

Regina Vossen (born 8 September 1962) is a German volleyball player. She competed in the women's tournament at the 1984 Summer Olympics.
