= Rachel Beliveau =

Canadian volleyball player (born 1961)

Personal information
- Born: 26 August 1961 (age 63); Sherbrooke, Quebec, Canada

Sport
- Sport: Volleyball

Rachel Beliveau (born 26 August 1961) is a Canadian volleyball player. She competed in the women's tournament at the 1984 Summer Olympics.
