= Josée Lebel =

Canadian volleyball player (born 1963)

Personal information
- Born: 14 June 1963 (age 62) Montreal, Quebec, Canada

Sport
- Sport: Volleyball

Josée Lebel (born 14 June 1963) is a Canadian volleyball player. She competed in the women's tournament at the 1984 Summer Olympics.
