= Marco Negri (volleyball) =

Italian volleyball player

Personal information
- Born: 24 May 1955 (age 71); Mantua, Italy
- Height: 1.93 m (6 ft 4 in)
- Weight: 84 kg (185 lb)

Volleyball information
- Position: Outside hitter
- Number: 1

Career
Teams
	Denicotin Cesenatico / Pallavolo Parma

National team
1976–1984	Italy
Honours
Men's volleyball
Representing Italy
Olympic Games
Bronze medal – third place	1984 Los Angeles	Team
World Championship
Silver medal – second place	1978 Italy
Mediterranean Games
Gold medal – first place	1983 Casablanca	Team

Marco Negri (born 24 May 1955) is a retired Italian volleyball player. He was part of Italian teams that finished eighth at the 1976 Summer Olympics, second at the 1978 FIVB World Championship, and third at the 1984 Summer Olympics.
