= Tracy Mills =

Canadian Olympic volleyball player (born 1962)

Personal information
- Born: 31 May 1962 (age 63) Edmonton, Alberta, Canada

Sport
- Sport: Volleyball

Tracy Mills (born 31 May 1962) is a Canadian volleyball player. She competed in the women's tournament at the 1984 Summer Olympics.
