= Jeanne Beauprey =

American volleyball player

Personal information
- Full name: Jeanne Marie Beauprey (-Reeves)
- Born: Jeanne Marie Beauprey; June 21, 1961 (age 65); Anaheim, California, U.S.
- Height: 183 cm (6 ft 0 in)
- Education: University of California, Los Angeles

Volleyball information
- Position: Middle blocker
- Number: 12 (1984)

National team
1983–1984	United States
Medal record
Women's volleyball
Representing the United States
Olympic Games
Silver medal – second place	1984 Los Angeles	Team
Pan American Games
Silver medal – second place	1983 Caracas	Team

Jeanne Marie Beauprey (born June 21, 1961) is an American former competitive volleyball player and silver medalist in the 1984 Summer Olympics in Los Angeles.

== College ==
Beauprey played college volleyball at UCLA. She was an All-American her senior year in 1982, and was inducted into the UCLA Hall of Fame in 2000.

== Beach volleyball ==
Beauprey played beach volleyball from 1987 to 1997, earning a total of just over $15,000 in prizes.

== Awards ==
- All-American 1982
- Pan American Games silver medal 1983
- Olympic silver medal 1984
- UCLA Hall of Fame 2000
