= Volleyball at the 1984 Summer Olympics =

Volleyball at the Games of the XXIII Olympiad
- Venue: Long Beach Arena
- Dates: July 29 – August 11, 1984
- No. of events: 2
- Competitors: 214 from 12 nations

This page presents the results of men's and women's volleyball tournaments during the Los Angeles Olympics in the summer of 1984. The competition was held in the Long Beach Arena, which had a capacity of 12,033.

== Schedule ==
P	Preliminary round	½	Semi-finals	B	Bronze medal match	F	Gold medal match

Event↓/Date →	29th Sun	30th Mon	31st Tue	1st Wed	2nd Thu	3rd Fri	4th Sat	5th Sun	6th Mon	7th Tue	8th Wed	9th Thu	10th Fri	11th Sat
Men	P		P		P		P		P		½			F
Women		P		P		P		½		F				

== Events ==
Two sets of medals were awarded in the following events:

- Indoor volleyball – men (10 teams, 118 athletes)
- Indoor volleyball – women (8 teams, 96 athletes)

== Medal table ==
Rank	Nation	Gold	Silver	Bronze	Total
1	United States	1	1	0	2
2	China	1	0	0	1
3	Brazil	0	1	0	1
4	Italy	0	0	1	1
4	Japan	0	0	1	1
Totals (5 entries)		2	2	2	6

== Medal summary ==
Event	Gold	Silver	Bronze
Men's indoor	United States; Douglas Dvorak; Dave Saunders; Steven Salmons; Paul Sunderland; Rich Duwelius; Steve Timmons; Craig Buck; Marc Waldie; Chris Marlowe (c); Aldis Berzins; Patrick Powers; Karch Kiraly	Brazil; Amauri Ribeiro; Antônio Carlos Gueiros Ribeiro; Bernard Rajzman; Bernardo Rocha de Rezende; Domingos Lampariello Neto; Fernando Roscio de Ávila; Marcus Vinícius Simões Freire; José Montanaro Junior; Renan Dal Zotto; Rui Campos do Nascimento; William da Silva (c); Xandó	Italy; Franco Bertoli; Francesco Dall'Olio; Giancarlo Dametto; Guido De Luigi; Giovanni Errichiello; Giovanni Lanfranco; Andrea Lucchetta; Pier Paolo Lucchetta; Marco Negri; Piero Rebaudengo; Paolo Vecchi; Fabio Vullo
Women's indoor	China; Lang Ping; Liang Yan; Zhu Ling; Hou Yuzhu; Yang Xilan; Jiang Ying; Li Yanjun; Yang Xiaojun; Zheng Meizhu; Zhang Rongfang (c); Su Huijuan; Zhou Xiaolan	United States; Paula Weishoff; Sue Woodstra (c); Rita Crockett; Laurie Flachmeier; Carolyn Becker; Flo Hyman; Rose Magers; Julie Vollertsen; Debbie Green-Vargas; Kimberly Ruddins; Jeanne Beauprey; Linda Chisholm	Japan; Yumi Egami; Kimie Morita; Yuko Mitsuya; Miyoko Hirose; Kyoko Ishida; Yoko Kagabu; Norie Hiro; Kayoko Sugiyama; Sachiko Otani; Keiko Miyajima; Emiko Odaka; Kumi Nakada

== Highlights ==
- The United States won their first men's title. Brazil took second. It was Karch Kiraly's first Olympic Gold medal.
- China won the women's title. The United States took second. It was the Iron Hammer Lang Ping's first Olympic Gold medal.
- The China National Women's Volleyball National Team completed the three-peat (winners in the World Cup 1981, World Volleyball Championships 1982, and Los Angeles Olympic Games 1984).

== See also ==
- Volleyball at the Friendship Games
