= Rose Magers =

American volleyball player

Personal information
- Full name: Rose Mary Magers-Powell
- Born: Rose Mary Magers; June 25, 1960 (age 66); Big Spring, Texas, U.S.
- Height: 190 cm (6 ft 3 in)
- Education: University of Houston; Louisiana State University

Volleyball information
- Position: Middle blocker
- Number: 8

National team
1982–1984	United States
Medal record
Women's volleyball
Representing the United States
Olympic Games
Silver medal – second place	1984 Los Angeles	Team
World Championship
Bronze medal – third place	1982 Peru
Pan American Games
Silver medal – second place	1983 Caracas	Team

Rose Mary Magers-Powell (born June 25, 1960), formerly known as Rose Magers, is a retired female volleyball player from the United States. As a middle blocker, Magers-Powell won a silver medal with the United States women's national volleyball team at the 1984 Summer Olympics in Los Angeles under the guidance of coach Arie Selinger.

Magers-Powell also helped the United States win the bronze medal at the 1982 FIVB World Championship in Peru and the silver medal at the 1983 Pan American Games in Caracas.

== College ==
Magers-Powell played college women's volleyball for three years with the University of Houston, and then transferred to Louisiana State University for her last year of college.

== Coaching ==
Magers-Powell is currently head coach of women's volleyball at Alabama A&M University in Huntsville.

== Personal life ==
Magers-Powell resides in Huntsville, Alabama with her husband Harry Powell and has two sons, William Powell and Brandon Powell.
