= Koshi Sobu =

Japanese volleyball player (born 1959)

Personal information
- Born: 27 January 1959 (age 67); Kurihara, Miyagi, Japan
- Height: 1.92 m (6 ft 4 in)

Volleyball information
- Number: 1

National team
1981-1984	Japan
Honours
Men's volleyball
Representing Japan
Asian Games
Gold medal – first place	1982 New Delhi	Team

Koshi Sobu (蘇武 幸志, Sobu Kōshi; born 27 January 1959) is a Japanese former volleyball player who competed in the 1984 Summer Olympics. Standing 192 cm tall and weighing 81 kg. At the Olympics, the Japanese men's volleyball team, with Sobu as a member, achieved a 7th-place finish.
