= Koji Wakayoshi =

Japanese water polo player

Personal information
- Born: August 20, 1961 (age 63)

Sport
- Sport: Water polo

Koji Wakayoshi (若吉 浩二, Wakayoshi Kōji, born 20 August 1961) is a Japanese former water polo player who competed and ranked 11th in the 1984 Summer Olympics.
