= Shuji Yamada =

Japanese volleyball player (born 1956)

Personal information
- Born: 2 June 1956 (age 70); Sapporo, Hokkaido, Japan
- Height: 1.87 m (6 ft 2 in)

Volleyball information
- Number: 7

National team
1980-1984	Japan
Honours
Men's volleyball
Representing Japan
Asian Games
Gold medal – first place	1982 New Delhi	Team

Shuji Yamada (山田 修司, Yamada Shūji) (born 2 June 1956) is a Japanese former volleyball player who competed in the 1984 Summer Olympics.
