= Kimio Sugimoto =

Japanese volleyball player (born 1957)

Personal information
- Born: 15 October 1957 (age 69); Funabashi, Chiba, Japan
- Height: 1.85 m (6 ft 1 in)

Volleyball information
- Position: Outside hitter
- Number: 9

National team
1982-1988	Japan
Honours
Men's volleyball
Representing Japan
Asian Games
Gold medal – first place	1982 New Delhi	Team

Kimio Sugimoto (杉本公雄, Sugimoto Kimio; born 15 October 1957) is a Japanese former volleyball player who competed in the 1984 Summer Olympics and in the 1988 Summer Olympics.
