= Heloísa Roese =

Brazilian volleyball player (born 1956)

Personal information
- Full name: Heloísa Helena Santos Roese
- Born: 14 October 1956 (age 69) Novo Hamburgo, Brazil
- Height: 1.80 m (5 ft 11 in)

Sport
- Sport: Volleyball
Medal record
Women's volleyball
Representing Brazil
Pan American Games
Bronze medal – third place	1979 Caguas	Team

Heloísa Roese (born 14 October 1956) is a Brazilian former volleyball player. She competed in the women's tournament at the 1984 Summer Olympics.
