= Minoru Iwata (volleyball) =

Japanese volleyball player (born 1957)

Personal information
- Born: 13 September 1957 (age 69)
- Height: 1.97 m (6 ft 6 in)

Volleyball information
- Position: Outside hitter
- Number: 10

National team
1980-1985	Japan
Honours
Men's volleyball
Representing Japan
Asian Games
Gold medal – first place	1982 New Delhi	Team

Minoru Iwata (岩田 稔, Iwata Minoru, born 13 September 1957) is a Japanese former volleyball player who competed in the 1984 Summer Olympics.
