= Lee Eun-kyung (volleyball) =

South Korean volleyball player and coach

Personal information
- Nationality: South Korean
- Born: 1 February 1961 (age 65)

National team
1990	South Korea

- Korean name
- Hangul: 이은경
- Hanja: 李恩敬
- RR: I Eungyeong
- MR: I Ŭn'gyŏng

Lee Eun-kyung (Korean: 이은경; born 1 February 1961) is a South Korean female volleyball player and coach.

She was part of the South Korea women's national volleyball team at the 1984 Summer Olympic Games.

Lee attended Namsung Girls' High School in Busan. She represented her school at the 10th President's Cup Volleyball Championships (Note: Korean: 대통령배 전국남녀고교배구대회; Hanja: 大統領盃全國男女高校排球大會; RR: Daetongnyeong Bae Jeonguk Namnyeo Gogyo Baegu Daehoe) in Gwangju in 1975 and in the high school division of the 33rd National Men's and Women's Classified Volleyball Championships (Note: Korean: 전국남녀종별배구선수권대회; Hanja: 全國男女種別排球選手權大會; RR: Jeonguk Namnyeo Jongbyeol Baegu Seonsugwon Daehoe) in Daejeon in 1978.

After her graduation in 1978, she played for Hyundai. The Korea Corporate Volleyball Federation (Note: Korean: 한국실업배구연맹; Hanja: 韓國實業排球聯盟; RR: Hanguk Sireop Baegu Yeonmaeng; homepage) honoured her with its Player of the Year Award in 1981.
