= Kazuya Mitake =

Japanese volleyball player (born 1951)

Mitake Kazuya

Personal information
- Born: 14 August 1951 (age 75); Yugawara, Kanagawa, Japan
- Height: 1.86 m (6 ft 1 in)

Volleyball information
- Position: Setter
- Number: 3

National team
1982-1984	Japan
Honours
Men's volleyball
Representing Japan
Asian Games
Gold medal – first place	1982 New Delhi	Team

Kazuya Mitake (御嶽 和也, Mitake Kazuya; born 14 August 1951) is a Japanese former volleyball player who competed in the 1984 Summer Olympics.
