= Yasushi Furukawa (volleyball) =

Japanese volleyball player (born 1961)

Personal information
- Born: 28 May 1961 (age 65) Shinjuku-ku, Tokyo, Japan
- Height: 1.80 m (5 ft 11 in)

Volleyball information
- Position: Setter
- Number: 6

National team
- Years: Team
- 1982–1986: Japan
Honours
Men's volleyball
Representing Japan
Goodwill Games
Bronze medal – third place	1986 Moscow
Asian Games
Gold medal – first place	1982 New Delhi	Team

Yasushi Furukawa (古川 靖志, Furukawa Yasushi; born 28 May 1961) is a Japanese former volleyball player who competed at the 1984 Summer Olympics in Los Angeles, where he finished in seventh place. Furukawa competed at the 1986 Goodwill Games in Moscow and won a bronze medal.
