= Laurie Corbelli =

American volleyball player

Personal information
- Born: Laurie Flachmeier Corbelli; January 28, 1957 (age 69); Detroit, Michigan, U.S.
- Height: 184 cm (6 ft 0 in)
- Education: Texas Lutheran University

Volleyball information
- Position: Outside hitter
- Number: 5

National team
| 1978–1984 | United States |
Medal record
Women's volleyball
Representing the United States
Olympic Games
| Silver medal – second place | 1984 Los Angeles | Team |
World Championships
| Bronze medal – third place | 1982 Peru |
Pan American Games
| Silver medal – second place | 1983 Caracas | Team |

Laurie Flachmeier Corbelli (born January 28, 1957) is an American former volleyball player and coach. Corbelli won a silver medal with the United States national team at the 1984 Summer Olympics in Los Angeles. She was an exceptional blocker.

== Coaching ==
Corbelli began her volleyball head coaching career at the University of San Francisco, where she served from 1986 to 1989. She compiled a 39–71 overall record there. In 1990, she moved to Santa Clara University, accumulating a 61–35 record in three seasons. She served as head coach at Texas A&M University from 1993 to 2017, compiling a record of 519–252.

== Personal life ==
Corbelli is married to John Corbelli, former assistant coach of Texas A&M volleyball, and together have two kids: Rachel and Russell.

== Playing career ==
- 1975 & 1976 AIAW Division II National Championship, Texas Lutheran
- 1978-84 United States Women's National Volleyball Team
- 1978 World Championship
- 1979 Pan American Games
- 1980 U.S. Olympic Team (Boycott)
- 1981 World Cup Competition
- 1982 World Championship, Bronze Medalist
- 1983 Pan American Games, Silver Medalist
- 1984 U.S. Olympic Team, Silver Medalist
- 1987-89 Major League Volleyball, San Jose Golddiggers

=== Awards and honors ===
- 1976 Most Valuable Player, National AAU Junior Olympics Championship Tournament
- 1977 USVBA Rookie of the Year, National Tournament, Hilo, Hawaii
- 1984 Silver Medalist, 1984 Olympic Games, Los Angeles, Calif.
- 1987 Most Valuable Player, Major League Volleyball
- 1987-89 Major League Volleyball All-Star and All-Pro Team
- 1989 Most Valuable Player, Major League Volleyball All-Star Game
- 1992 USVBA Player of the Year, National Tournament, Senior Division
- Three-time USVBA All-American (1985, 1986, 1992)
- 1998 USA Volleyball/Flo Hyman All-Time Great Player Award

=== Coaching honors ===
- 1987 West Coast Athletic Conference Women's Volleyball Coach of the Year
- 1991 West Coast Conference Co-Coach of the Year
- 1992 West Region Coach of the Year
- 1992 West Coast Conference Coach of the Year
- 1994 Southwest Conference Co-Coach of the Year
- 1995 District VI Coach of the Year
- 1995 Southwest Conference Coach of the Year
- 2000 Texas A&M Coach of the Year
- 2013 Earned 500th Match Win
- 2015 SEC Coach of the Year
- 2019 AVCA Hall of Fame Inductee

=== Other honors ===
- 1989 Garland Sports Hall of Fame
- 1994 Texas Lutheran College Athletic Hall of Honor
- 1994 NAIA Hall of Fame
- 1998-2000 Honorary Co-chair of the Children's Miracle Network for Brazos Valley
- 2002 USA Volleyball/George L. Fisher "Leader in Volleyball"
- 2006 L.V. Berkner High School Hall of Honor
