= Linda Chisholm =

American volleyball player

Personal information
- Born: Linda Rae Chisholm; December 21, 1957 (age 68); Northridge, California, U.S.
- Height: 6 ft 2 in (188 cm)
- Education: Pepperdine University

Volleyball information
- Position: Middle blocker
- Number: 14

National team
1982–1984	United States
Medal record
Women's volleyball
Representing the United States
Olympic Games
Silver medal – second place	1984 Los Angeles	Team
World Championship
Bronze medal – third place	1982 Peru
Pan American Games
Silver medal – second place	1983 Caracas	Team

Linda Rae Chisholm (born December 21, 1957) is an American retired volleyball player and silver medalist at the 1984 Summer Olympics in Los Angeles.

While representing the United States, Chisholm also won a bronze medal at the 1982 FIVB World Championship in Peru and a silver medal in the 1983 Pan American Games in Caracas, Venezuela.

== College ==
Chisholm played NCAA women's volleyball for the Pepperdine Waves from 1977 to 1979. In 1996, she was inducted into the Pepperdine Hall of Fame.

== Beach volleyball ==
Chisholm played beach volleyball from 1980 to 1999. In her career as a beach volleyball player, she won 39 tournaments and $267,000 in prizes.
