= P. V. Ramana =

Indian volleyball player

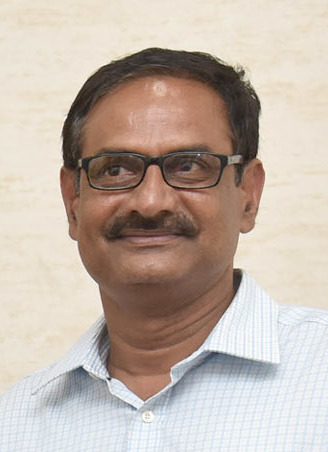

Personal information
- Full name: Pusarla Venkata Ramana
- Nationality: Indian
- Born: Nirmal, Andhra Pradesh, India (now in Telangana)
- Height: 6 ft 3 in (191 cm)
Honours
Representing India
Asian Games
Bronze medal – third place	1986 Seoul	Team competition

Pusarla Venkata Ramana is a former professional volleyball player from India and an employee of Indian Railways in Secunderabad. He was a member of the India men's national volleyball team and won a bronze medal at the 1986 Asian Games. He was awarded the Arjuna Award in 2000 for his contribution to Indian volleyball.

Ramana was born in Nirmal to a family originally hailing from Eluru that later relocated to Guntur and Nirmal. In an interview with ABN Andhra Jyothi, he said that his father had died when he was five years old, and he was raised in Hyderabad alongside his siblings. He completed his graduation, equivalent to a bachelor's degree, in Vijayawada. Ramana and his family regularly visit their family deity in Ratnalammakunta village of Eluru district, Andhra Pradesh.

== Family ==
Ramana's wife Vijaya has also been a national-level volleyball player. She hails from Vijayawada, Andhra Pradesh. Like him, she is an employee of Indian Railways. Their elder daughter, P. V. Divya, is a doctor by profession and played netball at the national level.

Their younger daughter, P. V. Sindhu, is a badminton player who is a two-time Olympic medallist, having won a silver medal at the 2016 Rio Olympics and a bronze medal at the 2020 Tokyo Olympics, and a World Champion, having won the gold in the 2019 BWF World Championships. Like her father, Sindhu is also an Arjuna Awardee, as well as a recipient of the Khel Ratna, Padma Shri and Padma Bhushan.
