= Kimberley Ruddins =

American volleyball player

Kim Ruddins

Personal information
- Born: Kimberley Grace Ruddins; September 3, 1963 (age 63); Los Angeles, California, U.S.
- Height: 5 ft 11 in (180 cm)
- Education: University of Southern California

Volleyball information
- Position: Setter
- Number: 11

National team
| 1981–1988 | United States |
Medal record
Women's volleyball
Representing the United States
Olympic Games
| Silver medal – second place | 1984 Los Angeles | Team |
Pan American Games
| Silver medal – second place | 1983 Caracas | Team |
| Bronze medal – third place | 1987 Indianapolis | Team |

Kimberley Grace "Kim" Ruddins (born September 3, 1963) is a retired volleyball player from the United States who won the silver medal with the United States women's national volleyball team at the 1984 Summer Olympics in Los Angeles. Four years later, she represented the United States at the 1988 Summer Olympics in Seoul. She played as a setter.

== Career ==
Ruddins began her volleyball career playing on the Westchester High School's women's team. She was a Los Angeles All-City selection in 1978, 1979, and 1980.

Ruddins played college volleyball with the USC Trojans. She was a three-time All-American, and helped the Trojans win the 1981 Championship title.

Ruddins was a member of the silver medal winning 1984 United States Women's Volleyball Olympic Team and the 1988 United States Women's Volleyball Olympic Team.

Ruddins was a Pan-American Games medalist, winning a silver in 1983, and a bronze in 1987. She competed for the United States in the 1981 and 1983 World University Games.

== Honors and awards ==
- In 2013, Ruddins was inducted into the CIF Los Angeles City Section Athletics Hall of Fame.
- In 2026, Ruddins was inducted into the Southern California Indoor Volleyball Hall of Fame.
