= Eizaburo Mitsuhashi =

Japanese volleyball player (born 1960)

Personal information
- Born: 5 January 1960 (age 66); Aomori, Japan
- Height: 1.86 m (6 ft 1 in)

Volleyball information
- Number: 4

National team
1982–1988	Japan
Honours
Men's volleyball
Representing Japan
Goodwill Games
Bronze medal – third place	1986 Moscow
Asian Games
Gold medal – first place	1982 New Delhi	Team

Eizaburo Mitsuhashi (三橋栄三郎, Mitsuhashi Eizaburō; born 5 January 1960) is a Japanese former volleyball player who competed at the 1984 Summer Olympics in Los Angeles and the 1988 Summer Olympics in Seoul. Mitsuhashi competed at the 1986 Goodwill Games in Moscow and won a bronze medal.
