= China women's national volleyball team =

China
- Association: Chinese Volleyball Association (CVA)
- Confederation: AVC
- Head coach: Zhao Yong
- FIVB ranking: 7 ▼1 (2 October 2026)

Uniforms
Home	Away	Third

Summer Olympics
- Appearances: 11 (First in 1984)
- Best result: (gold) (1984, 2004, 2016)

World Championship
- Appearances: 16 (First in 1956)
- Best result: (gold) (1982, 1986)

World Cup
- Appearances: 12 (First in 1977)
- Best result: (1981, 1985, 2003, 2015, 2019)
- www.volleyballchina.com (in Chinese)
Honours
Olympic Games
Gold medal – first place	1984 Los Angeles	Team
Gold medal – first place	2004 Athens	Team
Gold medal – first place	2016 Rio de Janeiro	Team
Silver medal – second place	1996 Atlanta	Team
Bronze medal – third place	1988 Seoul	Team
Bronze medal – third place	2008 Beijing	Team
World Championship
Gold medal – first place	1982 Peru
Gold medal – first place	1986 Czechoslovakia
Silver medal – second place	1990 China
Silver medal – second place	1998 Japan
Silver medal – second place	2014 Italy
Bronze medal – third place	2018 Japan
World Cup
Gold medal – first place	1981 Japan
Gold medal – first place	1985 Japan
Gold medal – first place	2003 Japan
Gold medal – first place	2015 Japan
Gold medal – first place	2019 Japan
Silver medal – second place	1991 Japan
Bronze medal – third place	1989 Japan
Bronze medal – third place	1995 Japan
Bronze medal – third place	2011 Japan
World Grand Champions Cup
Gold medal – first place	2001 Japan
Gold medal – first place	2017 Japan
Silver medal – second place	1993 Japan
Bronze medal – third place	2005 Japan
FIVB World Grand Prix
Gold medal – first place	2003 Andria
Silver medal – second place	1993 Hong Kong
Silver medal – second place	2001 Macau
Silver medal – second place	2002 Hong Kong
Silver medal – second place	2007 Ningbo
Silver medal – second place	2013 Sapporo
Bronze medal – third place	1994 Shanghai
Bronze medal – third place	1999 Yuxi
Bronze medal – third place	2005 Sendai
Nations League
Silver medal – second place	2023 Arlington, Texas
Bronze medal – third place	2018 Nanjing
Bronze medal – third place	2019 Nanjing
Asian Games
Gold medal – first place	1982 New Delhi	Team
Gold medal – first place	1986 Seoul	Team
Gold medal – first place	1990 Beijing	Team
Gold medal – first place	1998 Bangkok	Team
Gold medal – first place	2002 Busan	Team
Gold medal – first place	2006 Doha	Team
Gold medal – first place	2010 Guangzhou	Team
Gold medal – first place	2018 Jakarta-Palembang	Team
Gold medal – first place	2022 Hangzhou	Team
Gold medal – first place	2026 Aichi-Nagoya	Team
Silver medal – second place	1978 Bangkok	Team
Silver medal – second place	1994 Hiroshima	Team
Silver medal – second place	2014 Incheon	Team
Bronze medal – third place	1974 Tehran	Team
Asian Championship
Gold medal – first place	1979 Hong Kong
Gold medal – first place	1987 Shanghai
Gold medal – first place	1989 Hong Kong
Gold medal – first place	1991 Bangkok
Gold medal – first place	1993 Shanghai
Gold medal – first place	1995 Chiang Mai
Gold medal – first place	1997 Manila
Gold medal – first place	1999 Hong Kong
Gold medal – first place	2001 Nakhon Ratchasima
Gold medal – first place	2003 Ho Chi Minh City
Gold medal – first place	2005 Taicang
Gold medal – first place	2011 Taipei
Gold medal – first place	2015 Tianjin
Silver medal – second place	1983 Fukuoka
Silver medal – second place	2007 Nakhon Ratchasima
Silver medal – second place	2009 Hanoi
Silver medal – second place	2023 Nakhon Ratchasima
Silver medal – second place	2026 Tianjin
Bronze medal – third place	1975 Melbourne
Asian Cup
Gold medal – first place	2008 Nakhon Ratchasima
Gold medal – first place	2010 Taicang
Gold medal – first place	2014 Shenzhen
Gold medal – first place	2016 Vĩnh Phúc
Gold medal – first place	2018 Nakhon Ratchasima
Silver medal – second place	2012 Almaty
Silver medal – second place	2022 Pasig

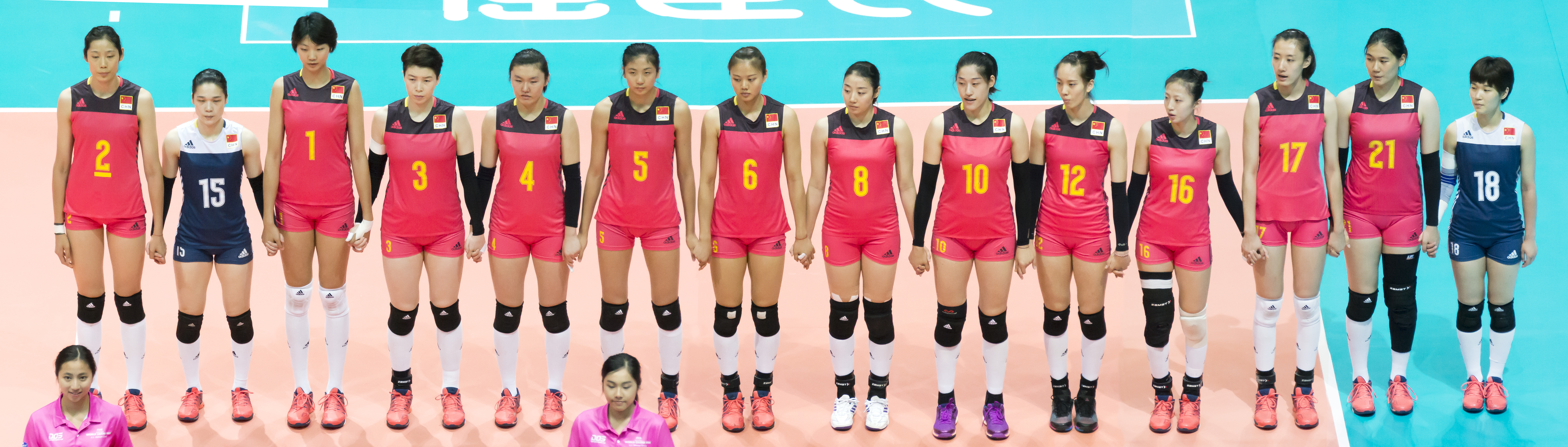
The China women's national volleyball team in 2017

The China women's national volleyball team (Chinese: 中国国家女子排球队, or 中国女排 for short) represents the People's Republic of China in international volleyball competitions and friendly matches governed by Chinese Volleyball Association.

The team is one of the leading and most successful squads in women's international volleyball, and one of the most popular sports team in China, having won ten championships titles in the three major international competitions of volleyball, including five World Cups (1981, 1985, 2003, 2015, 2019), two World Championships (1982, 1986) and three Olympic titles (1984, 2004, 2016).

China took five consecutive World titles in the 1980s. In 2011, 2014, 2015 and 2016, the Chinese women's volleyball team won the "Best Team of the year" award in the CCTV Sportsmanship Competition. The team now ranks 6th at the FIVB World Rankings.

== Tournaments record ==
=== International tournaments ===
==== Olympic Games ====
Champions Runners-up Third place Fourth place

Summer Olympics record
Year	Round	Position	Pld	W	L	SW	SL	Squad
(Japan) 1964	did not participate							
(Mexico) 1968	did not participate							
(West Germany) 1972	did not participate							
(Canada) 1976	did not participate							
(Soviet Union) 1980	did not participate							
(United States) 1984	Final	Champions	5	4	1	13	3	Squad
(South Korea) 1988	Semifinals	Third place	5	3	2	11	7	Squad
(Spain) 1992	7th place match	7th	4	1	3	8	9	Squad
(United States) 1996	Final	Runners-up	8	7	1	22	7	Squad
(Australia) 2000	5th–8th places	5th	8	4	4	14	14	Squad
(Greece) 2004	Final	Champions	8	7	1	23	8	Squad
(China) 2008	Semifinals	Third place	8	5	3	19	11	Squad
(United Kingdom) 2012	Quarterfinals	5th	6	3	3	13	13	Squad
(Brazil) 2016	Final	Champions	8	5	3	18	13	Squad
(Japan) 2020	Preliminary round	9th	5	2	3	8	9	Squad
(France) 2024	Quarterfinals	5th	4	3	1	11	6	Squad
(United States) 2028	To be determined							
Total	3 Titles							

==== World Championship ====
Champions Runners-up Third place Fourth place

World Championship record
Year	Round	Position	Pld	W	L	SW	SL	Squad
(Soviet Union) 1952	did not qualify							
(France) 1956	Final round	6th	12	5	7	21	24	Squad
(Brazil) 1960	did not qualify							
(Soviet Union) 1962	9th–14th places	9th	8	6	2	20	9	Squad
(Japan) 1967	did not qualify							
(Bulgaria) 1970	did not qualify							
(Mexico) 1974	13th–18th places	14th	11	8	3	26	20	Squad
(Soviet Union) 1978	5th–8th places	6th	10	8	2	24	9	Squad
(Peru) 1982	Final	Champions	10	8	2	24	6	Squad
(Czechoslovakia) 1986	Final	Champions	10	10	0	30	3	Squad
(China) 1990	Final	Runners-up	7	6	1	19	3	Squad
(Brazil) 1994	5th–8th places	8th	5	3	2	10	8	Squad
(Japan) 1998	Final	Runners-up	8	5	3	17	16	Squad
(Germany) 2002	Semifinals	4th	10	7	3	23	16	Squad
(Japan) 2006	5th–8th places	5th	11	8	3	27	11	Squad
(Japan) 2010	9th–12th places	10th	11	6	5	20	14	Squad
(Italy) 2014	Final	Runners-up	13	10	3	32	16	Squad
(Japan) 2018	Semifinals	Third place	13	11	2	36	11	Squad
(Netherlands) (Poland) 2022	Quarterfinals	6th	10	7	3	23	11	Squad
(Thailand) 2025	Round of 16	9th	4	3	1	10	5	Squad
(Canada) (United States) 2027	Qualified							
(Philippines) 2029	To be determined							
Total	2 Titles							

==== World Cup ====
Champions Runners-up Third place Fourth place

World Cup record (Defunct)
Year	Round	Position	Pld	W	L	SW	SL	Squad
(Uruguay) 1973	did not qualify							
(Japan) 1977		4th	6	4	2	13	11	Squad
(Japan) 1981		Champions	7	7	0	21	4	Squad
(Japan) 1985		Champions	7	7	0	21	1	Squad
(Japan) 1989		Third place	7	6	1	17	6	Squad
(Japan) 1991		Runners-up	8	7	1	21	6	Squad
(Japan) 1995		Third place	11	8	3	24	14	Squad
(Japan) 1999		5th	11	7	4	24	15	Squad
(Japan) 2003		Champions	11	11	0	33	4	Squad
(Japan) 2007	did not participate							
(Japan) 2011		Third place	11	8	3	30	13	Squad
(Japan) 2015		Champions	11	10	1	30	7	Squad
(Japan) 2019		Champions	11	11	0	30	10	Squad
Total	5 Titles							

==== World Grand Champions Cup ====
Champions Runners-up Third place Fourth place

World Grand Champions record (Defunct)
Year	Round	Position	Pld	W	L	SW	SL	Squad
(Japan) 1993	Round Robin	Runners-up	5	4	1	12	7	Squad
(Japan) 1997	Round Robin	4th	5	2	3	8	10	Squad
(Japan) 2001	Round Robin	Champions	5	5	0	15	3	Squad
(Japan) 2005	Round Robin	Third place	5	3	2	11	8	Squad
(Japan) 2009	did not qualify							
(Japan) 2013	did not qualify							
(Japan) 2017	Round Robin	Champions	5	5	0	15	4	Squad
Total	2 Titles							

==== World Grand Prix ====
Champions Runners-up Third place Fourth place

World Grand Prix record (Defunct)
Year	Round	Position	GP	MW	ML	Squad
(Hong Kong) 1993	Final Round	Runners-up	12	6	6	Squad
(China) 1994	Final Round	Third place	12	7	5	Squad
(China) 1995	Final Round	4th	15	7	8	Squad
(China) 1996	Final Round	4th	15	8	7	Squad
(Japan) 1997	Preliminary Round	5th	6	3	3	Squad
(Hong Kong) 1998	Final Round	4th	11	7	4	Squad
(China) 1999	Final Round	Third place	8	4	4	Squad
(Philippines) 2000	Final Round	4th	11	4	7	Squad
(Macau) 2001	Final Round	Runners-up	14	11	3	Squad
(Hong Kong) 2002	Final Round	Runners-up	12	10	2	Squad
(Italy) 2003	Final Round	Champions	10	8	2	Squad
(Italy) 2004	Final Round	5th	12	9	3	Squad
(Japan) 2005	Final Round	Third place	14	11	3	Squad
(Italy) 2006	Final Round	5th	12	10	2	Squad
(China) 2007	Final Round	Runners-up	14	8	6	Squad
(Japan) 2008	Final Round	5th	14	9	5	Squad
(Japan) 2009	Final Round	5th	14	8	6	Squad
(China) 2010	Final Round	4th	14	8	6	Squad
(Macau) 2011	Final Round	8th	13	6	7	Squad
(China) 2012	Final Round	5th	14	9	5	Squad
(Japan) 2013	Final Round	Runners-up	14	13	1	Squad
(Japan) 2014	Final Round	5th	14	7	7	Squad
(United States) 2015	Final Round	4th	14	11	3	Squad
(Thailand) 2016	Final Round	5th	12	9	3	Squad
(China) 2017	Final Round	4th	13	7	6	Squad
Total	1 Title					

==== Nations League ====
Champions Runners-up Third place Fourth place

Nations League record
Year	Round	Position	Pld	W	L	SW	SL	Squad
(China) 2018	Semifinals	Third place	19	9	10	36	34	Squad
(China) 2019	Semifinals	Third place	19	14	5	45	20	Squad
(Italy) 2021	Preliminary Round	5th	15	10	5	35	21	Squad
(Turkey) 2022	Quarterfinals	6th	13	8	5	30	20	Squad
(United States) 2023	Final	Runners-up	15	10	5	36	23	Squad
(Thailand) 2024	Quarterfinals	5th	13	9	4	29	17	Squad
(Poland) 2025	Quarterfinals	5th	13	9	4	32	23	Squad
(Macau) 2026	Semifinals	Fourth place	15	7	8	30	31	Squad
(N/A) 2027	qualified							
Total	0 Title		122	76	46	273	189	

=== Continental tournaments ===
==== Asian Games ====
- (Iran) 1974 — Bronze Medal
- (Thailand) 1978 — Silver Medal
- (India) 1982 — Gold Medal
- (South Korea) 1986 — Gold Medal
- (China) 1990 — Gold Medal
- (Japan) 1994 — Silver Medal
- (Thailand) 1998 — Gold Medal
- (South Korea) 2002 — Gold Medal
- (Qatar) 2006 — Gold Medal
- (China) 2010 — Gold Medal
- (South Korea) 2014 — Silver Medal
- (Indonesia) 2018 — Gold Medal
- (China) 2022 — Gold Medal
- (Japan) 2026 — Gold Medal

==== Asian Championship ====
- (Australia) 1975 — (bronze) Bronze Medal
- (Hong Kong) 1979 — (gold) Gold Medal
- (Japan) 1983 — (silver) Silver Medal
- (China) 1987 — (gold) Gold Medal
- (Hong Kong) 1989 — (gold) Gold Medal
- (Thailand) 1991 — (gold) Gold Medal
- (China) 1993 — (gold) Gold Medal
- (Thailand) 1995 — (gold) Gold Medal
- (Philippines) 1997 — (gold) Gold Medal
- (Hong Kong) 1999 — (gold) Gold Medal
- (Thailand) 2001 — (gold) Gold Medal
- (Vietnam) 2003 — (gold) Gold Medal
- (China) 2005 — (gold) Gold Medal
- (Thailand) 2007 — (silver) Silver Medal
- (Vietnam) 2009 — (silver) Silver Medal
- (Taiwan) 2011 — (gold) Gold Medal
- (Thailand) 2013 — 4th place
- (China) 2015 — (gold) Gold Medal
- (Philippines) 2017 — 4th place
- (South Korea) 2019 — 4th place
- (Thailand) 2023 — (silver) Silver Medal
- (China) 2026 — (silver) Silver Medal

==== Asian Cup ====
- (Thailand) 2008 — (gold) Gold Medal
- (China) 2010 — (gold) Gold Medal
- (Kazakhstan) 2012 — (silver) Silver Medal
- (China) 2014 — (gold) Gold Medal
- (Vietnam) 2016 — (gold) Gold Medal
- (Thailand) 2018 — (gold) Gold Medal
- (Philippines) 2022 — (silver) Silver Medal

== 2026 Results and fixtures ==
=== Intercontinental tournaments ===
==== 2026 FIVB Women's Volleyball Nations League ====
- Date: 3 June – 26 July

Preliminary round												Final round			Final Rank
Week 1				Week 2				Week 3				Quarterfinal	Semifinal	3rd place match	Final Rank
China				Turkey				Hong Kong				Macau			Final Rank
CZE	THA	SRB	POL	GER	FRA	BRA	TUR	CAN	UKR	DOM	ITA	USA	TUR	ITA	Final Rank
0–3	3–2	3–0	3–1	3–2	3–0	1–3	2–3	2–3	3–0	1–3	2–3	3–2	0–3	1–3	4th

==== 2026 AVC Women's Volleyball Continental Championship ====
- Date: 21 August – 30 August

Preliminary round			Final round			Final Rank
Pool A			Quarterfinal	Semifinal	Final	Final Rank
China						Final Rank
IRQ	IRN	TPE	VIE	IRN	THA	Final Rank
3–0	3–0	3–0	3–0	3–0	2–3	Runners-up

== Squads ==
=== Current squad ===
The following is the Chinese roster for the 2025 FIVB Women's Volleyball World Championship.

Head coach: Zhao Yong

No.	Name	Date of birth	Pos.	Height	Weight	2025–26 Club
1	Wu Mengjie	10 September 2002	OH	1.90 m (6 ft 3 in)	64 kg (141 lb)	(China) Jiangsu Zenith Steel
2	Zhuang Yushan	28 April 2003	OH	1.84 m (6 ft 0 in)	71 kg (157 lb)	(Italy) OMAG-MT San Giovanni in Marignano
3	Tang Xi	21 May 2004	OH	1.84 m (6 ft 0 in)	78 kg (172 lb)	(China) Jiangsu Zenith Steel
5	Yin Xiaolan	17 October 2004	S	1.84 m (6 ft 0 in)	65 kg (143 lb)	(China) Fujian Anxi
6	Gong Xiangyu	21 April 1997	OP	1.88 m (6 ft 2 in)	67 kg (148 lb)	(United States) LOVB Madison
7	Wang Yuanyuan	14 July 1997	MB	1.95 m (6 ft 5 in)	75 kg (165 lb)	(Turkey) Galatasaray S.K.
8	Wan Ziyue	19 December 2004	MB	1.96 m (6 ft 5 in)	67 kg (148 lb)	(China) Jiangsu Zenith Steel
10	Yang Shuming	31 July 2008	OP	1.92 m (6 ft 4 in)	79 kg (174 lb)	(China) Shanghai Bright Ubest
12	Li Yingying	19 February 2000	OH	1.92 m (6 ft 4 in)	78 kg (172 lb)	(China) Tianjin Bohai Bank
15	Chen Houyu	8 October 2005	MB	1.97 m (6 ft 6 in)	73 kg (161 lb)	(China) Shanghai Bright Ubest
17	Ni Feifan	14 February 2001	L	1.77 m (5 ft 10 in)	75 kg (165 lb)	(China) Jiangsu Zenith Steel
18	Wang Mengjie	14 November 1995	L	1.72 m (5 ft 8 in)	65 kg (143 lb)	(China) Shandong Rizhao Steel
21	Gao Yi	22 June 1998	MB	1.93 m (6 ft 4 in)	74 kg (163 lb)	(China) Shanghai Bright Ubest
23	Zhang Zixuan	15 August 2008	S	1.82 m (6 ft 0 in)	78 kg (172 lb)	(China) Jiangsu Zenith Steel

=== Former squad ===
The following is the Chinese roster for the 2024 Olympics Games.

Head coach: Cai Bin

No.	Name	Date of birth	Pos.	Height	Weight	Spike	Block	2024–25 Club
1	Yuan Xinyue	21 December 1996	MB	2.03 m (6 ft 8 in)	69 kg (152 lb)	317 cm (125 in)	311 cm (122 in)	(Turkey) VakıfBank S.K.
2	Zhu Ting	29 November 1994	OH	1.98 m (6 ft 6 in)	78 kg (172 lb)	327 cm (129 in)	300 cm (120 in)	(Italy) Imoco Volley Conegliano
3	Diao Linyu	29 March 1994	S	1.82 m (6 ft 0 in)	78 kg (172 lb)	309 cm (122 in)	303 cm (119 in)	(China) Jiangsu Zenith Steel
5	Gao Yi	22 June 1998	MB	1.93 m (6 ft 4 in)	74 kg (163 lb)	304 cm (120 in)	298 cm (117 in)	(China) Shanghai Bright Ubest
6	Gong Xiangyu	21 April 1997	OP	1.88 m (6 ft 2 in)	67 kg (148 lb)	313 cm (123 in)	302 cm (119 in)	(China) Jiangsu Zenith Steel
7	Wang Yuanyuan	14 July 1997	MB	1.95 m (6 ft 5 in)	75 kg (165 lb)	312 cm (123 in)	300 cm (120 in)	(China) Tianjin Bohai Bank
9	Zhang Changning	6 November 1995	OH	1.95 m (6 ft 5 in)	80 kg (180 lb)	315 cm (124 in)	303 cm (119 in)	(China) Jiangsu Zenith Steel
12	Li Yingying	19 February 2000	OH	1.92 m (6 ft 4 in)	78 kg (172 lb)	305 cm (120 in)	300 cm (120 in)	(China) Tianjin Bohai Bank
14	Zheng Yixin	6 May 1995	OP	1.89 m (6 ft 2 in)	71 kg (157 lb)	316 cm (124 in)	307 cm (121 in)	(China) Fujian
16	Ding Xia	13 January 1990	S	1.80 m (5 ft 11 in)	67 kg (148 lb)	305 cm (120 in)	300 cm (120 in)	(China) Liaoning Donggang Strawberry
18	Wang Mengjie	14 November 1995	L	1.72 m (5 ft 8 in)	65 kg (143 lb)	289 cm (114 in)	280 cm (110 in)	(China) Beijing BAIC Motor
21	Wu Mengjie	10 September 2002	OH	1.89 m (6 ft 2 in)	64 kg (141 lb)	320 cm (130 in)	315 cm (124 in)	(China) Jiangsu Zenith Steel
22	Zhuang Yushan (AP)	28 April 2003	OH	1.84 m (6 ft 0 in)	71 kg (157 lb)	316 cm (124 in)	307 cm (121 in)	(China) Fujian

- AP: Reserve Player

=== Notable squads ===
==== Olympics Games squads ====
- 1984 Olympic Games – Gold medal
  Lang Ping, Liang Yan, Zhu Ling, Hou Yuzhu, Yang Xilan, Jiang Ying, Li Yanjun, Yang Xiaojun, Zheng Meizhu, Zhang Rongfang (c), Su Huijuan, and Zhou Xiaolan. Head coach: Yuan Weimin.
- 1988 Olympic Games – Bronze medal
  Li Guojun, Zhou Hong, Hou Yuzhu, Wang Yajun, Yang Xilan, Su Huijuan, Jiang Ying, Cui Yongmei, Yang Xiaojun, Zheng Meizhu, Wu Dan, and Li Yueming. Head coach: Li Yaoxian.
- 1992 Olympic Games – 7th place
  Lai Yawen, Li Guojun, Zhou Hong, Ma Fang, Wang Yi, Su Huijuan, Chen Fengqin, Su Liqun, Sun Yue, Wu Dan, Gao Lin, and Li Yueming. Head coach: Hu Jin
- 1996 Olympic Games – Silver medal
  Cui Yongmei, He Qi, Lai Yawen (c), Li Yan, Liu Xiaoning, Pan Wenli, Sun Yue, Wang Lina, Wang Yi, Wang Ziling, Wu Yongmei, and Zhu Yunying. Head coach: Lang Ping
- 2000 Olympic Games – 5th place
  Chen Jing, Gui Chaoran, He Qi, Li Shan, Li Yan (L), Qiu Aihua, Sun Yue, Wang Lina, Wu Dan, Wu Yongmei, Yin Yin, and Zhu Yunying. Head coach: Hu Jin
- 2004 Olympic Games – Gold medal
  Feng Kun (c), Yang Hao, Liu Yanan, Li Shan, Zhou Suhong, Zhao Ruirui, Zhang Yuehong, Chen Jing, Song Nina, Wang Lina, Zhang Na (L), and Zhang Ping. Head coach: Chen Zhonghe
- 2008 Olympic Games – Bronze medal
  Wang Yimei, Feng Kun (c), Yang Hao, Liu Yanan, Wei Qiuyue, Xu Yunli, Zhou Suhong, Zhao Ruirui, Xue Ming, Li Juan, Zhang Na (L), and Ma Yunwen. Head coach: Chen Zhonghe
- 2012 Olympic Games – 7th place
  Wang Yimei, Mi Yang, Hui Ruoqi, Chu Jinling, Zhang Xian (L), Wei Queyue (c), Yang Junjing, Cui Yongmei, Yang Xiaojun, Zheng Meizhu, Shan Danna, and Xu Yunli. Head coach: Yu Juemin
- 2016 Olympic Games – Gold medal
  Yuan Xinyue, Zhu Ting, Yang Fangxu, Gong Xiangyu, Wei Qiuyue, Zhang Changning, Liu Xiaotong, Xu Yunli, Hui Ruoqi (c), Lin Li (L), Ding Xia, and Yan Ni. Head coach: Lang Ping
- 2020 Olympic Games – 9th place
  Yuan Xinyue, Zhu Ting (c), Gong Xiangyu, Wang Yuanyuan, Zhang Changning, Liu Xiaotong, Yao Di, Li Yingying, Ding Xia, Yan Ni, Wang Mengjie (L), and Liu Yanhan. Head coach: Lang Ping

=== Head coaches history ===
Note: The following list may not be complete.

- (China) Li Ange (1954–1956)
- (China) Hou Weiyi (1956, 1959–1962)
- (China) Qian Jiaxiang (1957)
- (China) He Bingkun (1958, 1965)
- (China) Que Yongwu (1963–1964)
- (China) Ma Zhanyuan (1966)
- (China) Wang Suyun (1972)
- (China) Xu Jie (1972)
- (China) Li Zongyong (1972–1974)
- (China) Han Yunbo (1975)
- (China) Yuan Weimin (1976–1984)
- (China) Deng Ruozeng (1985)
- (China) Zhang Rongfang (1986)
- (China) Li Yaoxian (1987–1988)
- (China) Hu Jin (1989–1992, 1999–2000)
- (China) Li Xiaofeng (1993–1994)
- (China) Lang Ping (1995–1998, 2013–2021)
- (China) Chen Zhonghe (2001–2008)
- (China) Wang Baoquan (2010)
- (China) Yu Juemin (2010–2012)
- (China) An Jiajie (interim) (2017–2018)
- (China) Cai Bin (2009, 2022–2024)
- (China) Zhao Yong (2025 – present)

== Sponsorships ==
The team has sponsorship agreements with many companies such as bedding brand DeRucci-MuSi and edible oils brand COFCO Fulinmen.

The team now is sponsored by or cooperated with Haier, China Pacific Insurance Company (CPIC), Adidas, China Resources Beverage.

== Kit providers ==
The table below shows the history of kit providers for the China national volleyball team.

Period	Kit provider
1981 – 2004	Mizuno
2005 – present	Adidas

== See also ==
- China women's national under-23 volleyball team
- China women's national under-20 volleyball team
- China women's national under-18 volleyball team
- Leap (film), 2020 film about the team
