= Han Kyung-ae =

South Korean volleyball player (born 1962)

Personal information
- Nationality: South Korean
- Born: 26 May 1962 (age 63)

Sport
- Sport: Volleyball

Han Kyung-ae (born 26 May 1962) is a South Korean volleyball player. She competed in the women's tournament at the 1984 Summer Olympics.
