= Carolyn Becker =

American volleyball player (born 1958)

Personal information
- Full name: Carolyn Marie Becker
- Born: November 8, 1958 (age 67); Lynwood, California, USA
- Height: 6 ft 0 in (183 cm)
- Education: University of Southern California

Volleyball information
- Position: Setter
- Number: 6

National team
1978–1984	United States
Medal record
Women's volleyball
Representing the United States
Olympic Games
Silver medal – second place	1984 Los Angeles	Team
World Championship
Bronze medal – third place	1982 Peru
Pan American Games
Silver medal – second place	1983 Caracas	Team

Carolyn Marie Becker (born November 8, 1958) is an American former volleyball player who played on the United States women's national volleyball team and won a silver medal in the 1984 Summer Olympics in Los Angeles. While representing the United States, Becker also won a bronze medal in the 1982 FIVB World Championship in Peru and a silver medal in the 1983 Pan American Games in Caracas.

== College ==
Becker played college volleyball with the University of Southern California Trojans.

== Awards ==
- FIVB World Championship bronze medal — 1982
- Pan American Games silver medal — 1983
- Olympic silver medal — 1984
