= Nozomi Sunouchi =

Japanese swimmer

Personal information
- Born: 28 April 1965 (age 61)

Sport
- Sport: Swimming

Nozomi Sunouchi (簾内 望, Sunouchi Nozomi; born 28 April 1965) is a Japanese swimmer. She competed in two events at the 1984 Summer Olympics.
