= Mikiyasu Tanaka =

Japanese volleyball player (born 1955)

Personal information
- Born: 18 March 1955 (age 71); Yumesaki, Hyōgo, Japan
- Height: 1.95 m (6 ft 5 in)

Volleyball information
- Position: Outside hitter
- Number: 8

National team
1974–1986	Japan
Honours
Men's volleyball
Representing Japan
Goodwill Games
Bronze medal – third place	1986 Moscow
Asian Games
Gold medal – first place	1974 Tehran	Team
Gold medal – first place	1982 New Delhi	Team
Silver medal – second place	1978 Bangkok	Team

Mikiyasu Tanaka (田中幹保, Tanaka Mikiyasu; born 18 March 1955) is a Japanese former volleyball player who competed at the 1976 Summer Olympics in Montreal and 1984 Summer Olympics in Los Angeles. Tanaka competed at the 1986 Goodwill Games in Moscow and won a bronze medal.
