= Lee Un-yim =

South Korean volleyball player (born 1960)

Personal information
- Nationality: South Korean
- Born: 23 March 1960 (age 65)

Sport
- Sport: Volleyball

Lee Un-yim (born 23 March 1960) is a South Korean volleyball player. She competed in the women's tournament at the 1984 Summer Olympics.
