= Kim Jeong-sun =

South Korean volleyball player (born 1961)

Personal information
- Nationality: South Korean
- Born: 8 July 1961 (age 63)

Sport
- Sport: Volleyball

Kim Jeong-sun (born 8 July 1961) is a South Korean volleyball player. She competed in the women's tournament at the 1984 Summer Olympics.
