= Hou Yuzhu =

Chinese volleyball player (born 1963)

Personal information
- Born: 7 February 1963 (age 63); Yongtai, Fujian, China
- Height: 184 cm (6 ft 0 in)

Volleyball information
- Position: Outside hitter
- Number: 4

National team
1983–1988	China
Honours
Women's volleyball
Representing China
Olympic Games
Gold medal – first place	1984 Los Angeles	Team
Bronze medal – third place	1988 Seoul	Team
World Championship
Gold medal – first place	1986 Czechoslovakia	Team
FIVB World Cup
Gold medal – first place	1985 Japan
Asian Games
Gold medal – first place	1986 Seoul	Team

Hou Yuzhu (Chinese: 侯玉珠; pinyin: Hóu Yùzhū; born 7 March 1963) is a Chinese volleyball player who competed in the 1984 Summer Olympics in Los Angeles and the 1988 Summer Olympics in Seoul.

== Career ==
In 1984, Hou was a member of the Chinese volleyball team that won the gold medal at the Olympic Games. She played all five matches.

In 1986, Hou won a gold medal while playing for China in the FIVB World Championship.

In 1988, Hou was part of the Chinese team that won the bronze medal at the Olympic Games. She played all five matches again.
