= Su Huijuan =

Chinese volleyball player

Personal information
- Born: 3 April 1964 (age 62); Tianjin, China
- Height: 179 cm (5 ft 10 in)

Volleyball information
- Position: Setter
- Number: 7

National team
1983–1994	China
Honours
Women's volleyball
Representing China
Olympic Games
Gold medal – first place	1984 Los Angeles	Team
Bronze medal – third place	1988 Seoul	Team
World Championship
Gold medal – first place	1986 Czechoslovakia	Team
Silver medal – second place	1990 China	Team
FIVB World Cup
Gold medal – first place	1985 Japan
Silver medal – second place	1991 Japan
Bronze medal – third place	1989 Japan
Asian Games
Gold medal – first place	1986 Seoul	Team
Gold medal – first place	1990 Beijing	Team
Silver medal – second place	1994 Hiroshima	Team

Su Huijuan (simplified Chinese: 苏惠娟; traditional Chinese: 蘇惠娟; pinyin: Sū Huìjuān; born 3 April 1964) is a Chinese volleyball player who competed in the 1984 Summer Olympics, in the 1988 Summer Olympics, and in the 1992 Summer Olympics.

In 1984, Su was a member of the Chinese national volleyball team that won the Olympic gold medal. Four years later, in 1988, Su was part of the Chinese team that won the Olympic bronze medal. In 1992, she finished seventh with the Chinese team in the Olympics.

== Awards ==
=== National team ===
==== Senior team ====
- 1984 Los Angeles Olympic Games - Gold Medal
- 1985 World Cup - Gold Medal
- 1986 World Championship - Gold Medal
