= Zhu Ling (volleyball) =

Chinese volleyball player

Personal information
- Born: 10 July 1957 (age 69); Laiwu, Shandong Province, People’s Republic of China
- Height: 177 cm (5 ft 10 in)

Volleyball information
- Position: Opposite
- Number: 9 (1981); 3 (1984)

National team
| 1981–1984 | China |
Honours
Women's volleyball
Representing China
Olympic Games
| Gold medal – first place | 1984 Los Angeles | Team |
FIVB World Cup
| Gold medal – first place | 1981 Japan |

Zhu Ling (simplified Chinese: 朱玲, born 10 July 1957) is a Chinese volleyball player who won a gold medal in the 1984 Summer Olympics in Los Angeles.

In 1984, Zhu was a member of the Chinese volleyball team that defeated the United States to win the gold medal. She played all five matches.

Zhu was born in Laiwu, Shandong Province. She started volleyball training in 1970 in Chongqing, and was admitted into Sichuan provincial team in 1975. Zhu was admitted into Chinese national team in 1979, and later, helped China to win both World Cup in 1981 and the Olympics in 1984. After retirement, Zhu studied in Department of Chinese Literature at Sichuan University. Since graduation, she has been serving at Sichuan Provincial Sports Bureau. In 2004, Zhu was promoted to the director of the Bureau.

== Awards ==
=== National team ===
- 1981 World Cup - Gold Medal
- 1984 Los Angeles Olympic Games - Gold Medal
