= Hisaharu Saito =

Japanese water polo player

Personal information
- Born: November 6, 1962 (age 62)

Sport
- Sport: Water polo

Hisaharu Saito (斉藤 久治, Saitō Hisaharu, born 6 November 1962) is a Japanese former water polo player who competed in the 1984 Summer Olympics.
