= Li Yanjun =

Chinese volleyball player (born 1963)

Personal information
- Born: 18 March 1963 (age 63); Liaoning, China
- Height: 179 cm (5 ft 10 in)

Volleyball information
- Position: Outside hitter
- Number: 9

National team
1983–1986	China
Honours
Women's volleyball
Representing China
Olympic Games
Gold medal – first place	1984 Los Angeles	Team
World Championship
Gold medal – first place	1986 Czechoslovakia	Team
FIVB World Cup
Gold medal – first place	1985 Japan
Asian Games
Gold medal – first place	1986 Seoul	Team

Li Yanjun (simplified Chinese: 李延军, born 18 March 1963) is a Chinese volleyball player who competed in the 1984 Summer Olympics in Los Angeles.

In 1984, Li was a member of the Chinese volleyball team that won the gold medal. She played four matches including the final. She won the 1985 World Cup and the 1986 World Championship.

== Awards ==
=== National team ===
- 1984 Olympic Games Los Angeles - Gold Medal
- 1985 World Cup - Gold Medal
- 1986 World Championship - Gold Medal
