= Jiang Ying (volleyball) =

Chinese volleyball player

Personal information
- Born: 19 July 1963 (age 63); Rongcheng, Shandong, China
- Height: 180 cm (5 ft 11 in)

Volleyball information
- Position: Outside hitter
- Number: 8

National team
1981–1988	China
Honours
Women's volleyball
Representing China
Olympic Games
Gold medal – first place	1984 Los Angeles	Team
Bronze medal – third place	1988 Seoul	Team
World Championship
Gold medal – first place	1982 Peru
Gold medal – first place	1986 Czechoslovakia	Team
FIVB World Cup
Gold medal – first place	1985 Japan
Asian Games
Gold medal – first place	1982 New Delhi	Team
Gold medal – first place	1986 Seoul	Team

Jiang Ying (Chinese: 姜英; pinyin: Jiāng Yīng; born 19 July 1963) is a Chinese volleyball player who competed in the 1984 Summer Olympics in Los Angeles and in the 1988 Summer Olympics in Seoul.

== Career ==
Jiang won the gold medal with the Chinese team at the 1982 FIVB World Championship. Two years later, she was a member of the Chinese team that won the 1984 Olympic gold medal.

Jiang competed with the Chinese team and won the gold medal at the 1986 FIVB World Championship. Two years later, in 1988, Jiang won the Olympic bronze medal with the Chinese team.
