= Lee Young-sun (volleyball) =

South Korean volleyball player (born 1962)

Lee Yeong-seon
Personal information
- Nationality: South Korean
- Born: 20 January 1962 (age 63)

Sport
- Sport: Volleyball

Lee Yeong-seon (born 20 January 1962) is a South Korean volleyball player. She competed in the women's tournament at the 1984 Summer Olympics.
