= Zhang Rongfang =

Chinese volleyball player

Personal information
- Born: 15 April 1957 (age 69); Chengdu, Sichuan, People’s Republic of China
- Height: 174 cm (5 ft 9 in)

Volleyball information
- Position: Outside hitter
- Number: 11 (1981); 12 (1982–1984)

National team
1977–1984	China
Honours
Women's volleyball
Representing China
Olympic Games
Gold medal – first place	1984 Los Angeles	Team
World Championship
Gold medal – first place	1982 Peru
FIVB World Cup
Gold medal – first place	1981 Japan
Asian Games
Gold medal – first place	1982 New Delhi	Team
Silver medal – second place	1978 Bangkok	Team

Zhang Rongfang (Chinese: 张蓉芳; born 15 April 1957) is a Chinese retired volleyball player and coach who competed in the 1984 Summer Olympics. She was a member of the Chinese volleyball team that won the gold medal, having played in all five matches.

== Career as player ==
Zhang was a member of the Chinese national team that won gold over the United States at the 1984 Summer Olympics in Los Angeles. She was also a member of the team that won gold medals in the FIVB World Championship in 1982 in Lima and the FIVB World Cup in 1981 in Osaka.

== Coaching ==
As a volleyball coach, Zhang led the women's Chinese national team to gold at the 1986 FIVB World Championship in Prague.

== Personal life ==
Zhang is married to former volleyball player and coach Hu Jin, who also coached the women's national team between 1989 and 1993 and 1999 and 2001. They have a son together.

== Awards ==
=== National team ===
- 1981 World Cup - Gold Medal
- 1982 World Championship - Gold Medal
- 1984 Los Angeles Olympic Games - Gold Medal
