= Yang Xiaojun =

Chinese volleyball player

Personal information
- Born: 18 May 1963 (age 63); Beijing, China
- Height: 181 cm (5 ft 11 in)

Volleyball information
- Position: Middle blocker
- Number: 10

National team
1983–1988	China
Honours
Women's volleyball
Representing China
Olympic Games
Gold medal – first place	1984 Los Angeles	Team
Bronze medal – third place	1988 Seoul	Team
World Championship
Gold medal – first place	1986 Czechoslovakia	Team
FIVB World Cup
Gold medal – first place	1985 Japan
Asian Games
Gold medal – first place	1986 Seoul	Team

Yang Xiaojun (simplified Chinese: 杨晓君; traditional Chinese: 楊曉君; pinyin: Yáng Xiǎojūn; born 18 May 1963) is a Chinese volleyball player who competed in the 1984 Summer Olympics in Los Angeles and the 1988 Summer Olympics in Seoul.

In 1984, Yang was a member of the Chinese volleyball team that won the Olympic gold medal.

Four years later, in 1988, Yang was part of the Chinese team that won the Olympic bronze medal.

== Personal life ==
Yang was head coach of the female volleyball team 1. VC Wiesbaden in Germany. She was dismissed in 2011.

Yang has one daughter.

== Awards ==
=== National team ===
- 1984 Los Angeles Olympic Games - Gold Medal
- 1985 World Cup - Gold Medal
- 1986 World Championship - Gold Medal
