= Liang Yan =

Chinese volleyball player

Personal information
- Born: 4 October 1961 (age 65); Sichuan, People's Republic of China
- Height: 177 cm (5 ft 10 in)

Volleyball information
- Position: Opposite
- Number: 2

National team
1979–1986	China
Honours
Women's volleyball
Representing China
Olympic Games
Gold medal – first place	1984 Los Angeles	Team
World Championship
Gold medal – first place	1982 Peru
Gold medal – first place	1986 Czechoslovakia	Team
FIVB World Cup
Gold medal – first place	1981 Japan
Gold medal – first place	1985 Japan
Asian Games
Gold medal – first place	1982 New Delhi	Team
Gold medal – first place	1986 Seoul	Team

Liang Yan (Chinese: 梁艳, born 4 October 1961) is a Chinese volleyball player who competed in the 1984 Summer Olympics in Los Angeles.

In 1984, Liang was a member of the Chinese volleyball team that won the gold medal. She played all five matches. She is the only player to win all five straight major titles for China women's national volleyball team, during 1981–1986.

== Awards ==
=== National team ===
- 1981 World Cup - Gold Medal
- 1982 World Championship - Gold Medal
- 1984 Olympic Games Los Angeles - Gold Medal
- 1985 World Cup - Gold Medal
- 1986 World Championship - Gold Medal
