= Kayoko Sugiyama =

Japanese volleyball player (born 1961)

Personal information
- Born: 31 October 1961 (age 64); Ami, Ibaraki, Japan
- Height: 1.78 m (5 ft 10 in)

Volleyball information
- Position: Outside hitter
- Number: 8 (1984); 2 (1988)

National team
1981–1988	Japan
Honours
Women's volleyball
Representing Japan
Olympic Games
Bronze medal – third place	1984 Los Angeles	Team
FIVB World Cup
Silver medal – second place	1981 Japan
Asian Games
Silver medal – second place	1982 New Delhi	Team

Kayoko Sugiyama (Japanese: 杉山 加代子; born 31 October 1961) is a Japanese former volleyball player who competed in the 1984 Summer Olympics in Los Angeles and the 1988 Summer Olympics in Seoul.

In 1984, she was a member of the Japanese team that won the bronze medal in the Olympic tournament.

Four years later, she finished fourth with the Japanese team in the 1988 Olympic tournament.
