= Zheng Meizhu =

Chinese volleyball player

Personal information
- Born: 5 November 1962 (age 63); Fuzhou, Fujian, People’s Republic of China
- Height: 172 cm (5 ft 8 in)

Volleyball information
- Position: Outside hitter
- Number: 11

National team
1979–1988	China
Honours
Women's volleyball
Representing China
Olympic Games
Gold medal – first place	1984 Los Angeles	Team
Bronze medal – third place	1988 Seoul	Team
World Championship
Gold medal – first place	1982 Peru
Gold medal – first place	1986 Czechoslovakia	Team
FIVB World Cup
Gold medal – first place	1985 Japan
Asian Games
Gold medal – first place	1982 New Delhi	Team
Gold medal – first place	1986 Seoul	Team

Zheng Meizhu (simplified Chinese: 郑美珠; traditional Chinese: 鄭美珠; pinyin: Zhèng Měizhū; born 5 November 1962) is a Chinese volleyball player who competed in the 1984 Summer Olympics in Los Angeles and the 1988 Summer Olympics in Seoul.

In 1984, Zheng was a member of the Chinese volleyball team that won the gold medal. She played all five matches.

Four years later, in 1988, Zheng was part of the Chinese team that won the bronze medal. She played all five matches again.

Zheng was born in Fuzhou, Fujian Province. In 1975, she entered Fuzhou amateur sports school to play volleyball. In 1977, she became a member of provincial team. In 1979, she was summoned into Chinese national team twice. She was admitted into national team for third time in 1982.

From sports school, to provincial team, to national team, Zheng was always the youngest player. Doubts were also cast on her height (172 cm). After winning the Asian Tournament in 1979, Zheng didn't compete in World Cup in 1981, held in Japan.

In the end of 1991, Zheng went to Germany to play in a volleyball club. After retiring, she started doing business with her husband. She later became a manager in a Chinese medicinal rehabilitation facility near Munich. She is married and gave birth to two boys.

In 2008, Zheng came back to China and participated in Olympic torch relay in Fuzhou.

== Awards ==
=== National team ===
- 1982 World Championship - Gold Medal
- 1984 Los Angeles Olympic Games - Gold Medal
- 1985 World Cup - Gold Medal
- 1986 World Championship - Gold Medal
