= Yumi Maruyama =

Japanese volleyball player (born 1957)

Personal information
- Born: Yumi Egami (江上 由美); 30 November 1957 (age 68) Setagaya, Tokyo, Japan
- Height: 1.75 m (5 ft 9 in)

Volleyball information
- Position: Middle blocker
- Number: 1

National team
- Years: Team
- 1977–1988: Japan
Honours
Women's volleyball
Representing Japan
Olympic Games
Bronze medal – third place	1984 Los Angeles	Team
World Championship
Silver medal – second place	1978 Soviet Union
FIVB World Cup
Gold medal – first place	1977 Japan
Silver medal – second place	1981 Japan
Asian Games
Gold medal – first place	1978 Bangkok	Team
Silver medal – second place	1982 New Delhi	Team

Yumi Maruyama (née Egami, Japanese: 丸山 由美; born 30 November 1957) is a Japanese former volleyball player who competed at the 1984 Summer Olympics in Los Angeles and the 1988 Summer Olympics in Seoul.

In 1984, Maruyama was a member of the Japanese team that won the bronze medal at the Olympic tournament.

Four years later, she finished fourth with the Japanese team at the 1988 Olympic tournament.

== Club volleyball ==
After completing high school, Maruyama joined Hitachi Ltd., where she became a captain of the team in 1979.

== Personal life ==
Maruyama was born in Setagaya, and grew up in Higashimurayama, Tokyo. She attended Shoin Junior and Senior High School.
