= Norie Hiro =

Japanese volleyball player (born 1965)

Personal information
- Born: 26 July 1965 (age 61); Nagoya, Aichi, Japan
- Height: 1.83 m (6 ft 0 in)

Volleyball information
- Position: Middle blocker
- Number: 7

National team
| 1983–1989 | Japan |
Honours
Women's volleyball
Representing Japan
Olympic Games
| Bronze medal – third place | 1984 Los Angeles | Team |
Asian Games
| Silver medal – second place | 1986 Seoul | Team |

Norie Hiro (Japanese: 廣 紀江; born 26 July 1965) is a Japanese former volleyball player who competed in the 1984 Summer Olympics in Los Angeles and the 1988 Summer Olympics in Seoul.

In 1984, she was a member of the Japanese team that won the bronze medal in the Olympic tournament.

Four years later, she finished fourth with the Japanese team in the 1988 Olympic tournament.
