= Shudo Kawawa =

Japanese swimmer

Personal information
- Born: September 7, 1965 (age 60)

Sport
- Sport: Swimming
- Strokes: Butterfly

Shudo Kawawa (川和 秀動, Kawawa Shūdō; born 7 September 1965) is a former Japanese swimmer who competed in the 1984 Summer Olympics.
