= Hiroaki Okuno (volleyball) =

Japanese volleyball player (born 1960)

Personal information
- Born: 23 September 1960 (age 66); Sendai, Miyagi, Japan
- Height: 1.87 m (6 ft 2 in)

Volleyball information
- Position: Outside hitter
- Number: 5

National team
1981-1984	Japan
Honours
Men's volleyball
Representing Japan
Asian Games
Gold medal – first place	1982 New Delhi	Team

Hiroaki Okuno (奥野 浩昭, Okuno Hiroaki; born 23 September 1960) is a Japanese former volleyball player who competed in the 1984 Summer Olympics.
