= Emiko Odaka =

Japanese volleyball player (born 1962)

Personal information
- Born: 14 December 1962 (age 63); Ogose, Saitama, Japan
- Height: 1.79 m (5 ft 10 in)

Volleyball information
- Position: Setter
- Number: 11

National team
1982–1985	Japan
Honours
Women's volleyball
Representing Japan
Olympic Games
Bronze medal – third place	1984 Los Angeles	Team
Asian Games
Silver medal – second place	1982 New Delhi	Team

Emiko Odaka (Japanese: 小高 笑子; born 14 December 1962) is a Japanese former volleyball player who competed in the 1984 Summer Olympics in Los Angeles.

In 1984, Odaka was a member of the Japanese team that won the bronze medal in the Olympic tournament.
