= Kimie Morita =

Japanese volleyball player (born 1958)

Personal information
- Born: 27 February 1958 (age 68); Suita, Osaka, Japan
- Height: 1.71 m (5 ft 7 in)

Volleyball information
- Position: Opposite
- Number: 2

National team
1982–1984	Japan
Honours
Women's volleyball
Representing Japan
Olympic Games
Bronze medal – third place	1984 Los Angeles	Team
Asian Games
Silver medal – second place	1982 New Delhi	Team

Kimie Morita (Japanese: 森田 貴美枝; born 27 February 1958) is a Japanese former volleyball player who competed in the 1984 Summer Olympics in Los Angeles.

== Professional career ==
In 1984, she was a member of the Japanese team that won the bronze medal in the Olympic tournament.
