= Yoko Kagabu =

Japanese volleyball player (born 1960)

Personal information
- Born: 28 October 1960 (age 66) Akita, Akita, Japan
- Height: 1.70 m (5 ft 7 in)

Volleyball information
- Position: Setter
- Number: 6

National team
- Years: Team
- 1983–1985: Japan
Honours
Women's volleyball
Representing Japan
Olympic Games
Bronze medal – third place	1984 Los Angeles	Team

Yoko Kagabu (利部 陽子, Kagabu Yōko; born 28 October 1960) is a Japanese former volleyball player who competed in the 1984 Summer Olympics in Los Angeles.

In 1984, she was a member of the Japanese team that won the bronze medal in the Olympic tournament.
