= Keiko Miyajima =

Japanese volleyball player (born 1965)

Personal information
- Born: 24 September 1965 (age 61); Omiya, Saitama, Japan
- Height: 1.77 m (5 ft 10 in)

Volleyball information
- Position: Opposite
- Number: 10

National team
1983–1987	Japan
Honours
Women's volleyball
Representing Japan
Olympic Games
Bronze medal – third place	1984 Los Angeles	Team
Asian Games
Silver medal – second place	1986 Seoul	Team

Keiko Miyajima (Japanese: 宮島 恵子; born 24 September 1965) is a Japanese former volleyball player who competed in the 1984 Summer Olympics in Los Angeles.

In 1984, she was a member of the Japanese team that won the bronze medal in the Olympic tournament.
