= Kumi Nakada =

Japanese volleyball player (born 1965)

Personal information
- Born: 3 September 1965 (age 61); Tokyo, Japan
- Height: 1.76 m (5 ft 9 in)

Volleyball information
- Position: Setter
- Number: 12 (1984); 8 (1988); 2 (1992)

National team
1982–1992	Japan
Honours
Women's volleyball
Representing Japan
Olympic Games
Bronze medal – third place	1984 Los Angeles	Team
Asian Games
Silver medal – second place	1982 New Delhi	Team
Silver medal – second place	1986 Seoul	Team

Kumi Nakada (中田 久美, Nakada Kumi; born 3 September 1965) is a former professional volleyball player and former coach of Hisamitsu Springs. She was a setter who led Japan to the bronze medal at the 1984 Summer Olympics in Los Angeles at 18 years of age.

== Coaching ==
In October 2016, Nakada became the Japan women's national volleyball team's head coach. She retired from the position in August 2021, after the team finished in 10th place in the 2020 Summer Olympics in Tokyo.

== Personal life ==
After brief stints as a fashion model and motivational speaker, Nakada currently provides colour commentary and makes guest appearances in a wide range of sports and variety media in Japan. She is represented by Sports Biz in Tokyo.

== National team ==
- 1982: 4th place in the World Championship
- 1984: 3rd place in the Olympic Games of Los Angeles
- 1986: 7th place in the World Championship
- 1988: 4th place in the Olympic Games of Seoul
- 1992: 5th place in the Olympic Games of Barcelona
