= Yuko Mitsuya =

Japanese volleyball player (born 1958)

Personal information
- Born: 29 July 1958 (age 68); Katsuyama, Fukui, Japan
- Height: 1.77 m (5 ft 9 1/2 in)

Volleyball information
- Position: Middle blocker
- Number: 3

National team
1981–1984	Japan
Honours
Women's volleyball
Representing Japan
Olympic Games
Bronze medal – third place	1984 Los Angeles	Team
FIVB World Cup
Silver medal – second place	1981 Japan
Asian Games
Silver medal – second place	1982 New Delhi	Team

Yuko Mitsuya (三屋 裕子 Mitsuya Yūko, born 29 July 1958) is a Japanese former volleyball player who was a member of the Japanese women's national volleyball team that won the bronze medal at the 1984 Summer Olympics in Los Angeles.

== Personal life ==
Mitsuya is the current president of the Japan Basketball Association and a member of the FIBA Central Board, the highest executive body of FIBA.

== National team ==
- 1982: 4th place in the World Championship
- 1984: 3rd place in the Olympic Games of Los Angeles
