= Kyoko Ishida =

Japanese volleyball player (born 1960)

Personal information
- Full name: Kyoko Ishida (-Noguchi)
- Born: 12 July 1960 (age 66); Osaka, Osaka, Japan
- Height: 1.77 m (5 ft 10 in)

Volleyball information
- Position: Middle blocker
- Number: 5

National team
1982–1985	Japan
Honours
Women's volleyball
Representing Japan
Olympic Games
Bronze medal – third place	1984 Los Angeles	Team
Asian Games
Silver medal – second place	1982 New Delhi	Team

Kyoko Ishida (石田 京子, Ishida Kyōko; born 12 July 1960) is a Japanese former volleyball player who competed in the 1984 Summer Olympics in Los Angeles.

In 1984, she was a member of the Japanese team that won the bronze medal in the Olympic tournament.
