= Zhou Xiaolan =

Chinese volleyball player

Personal information
- Born: 9 October 1957 (age 69); Nanjing, Jiangsu Province, People’s Republic of China
- Height: 182 cm (6 ft 0 in)

Volleyball information
- Position: Middle blocker
- Number: 4 (1981); 5 (1982-1984)

National team
| 1977–1984 | China |
Honours
Women's volleyball
Representing China
Olympic Games
| Gold medal – first place | 1984 Los Angeles | Team |
World Championship
| Gold medal – first place | 1982 Peru |
FIVB World Cup
| Gold medal – first place | 1981 Japan |

Zhou Xiaolan (simplified Chinese: 周晓兰, born 9 October 1957) is a former Chinese volleyball player who was a starting middle blocker for the China Women's National Volleyball Team that won three gold medals in three world competitions in the early 1980s.

In 1984, Zhou was a core member of the Chinese volleyball team that won the gold medal at the Los Angeles Summer Olympics over the United States.

== Personal life ==
After retiring in 1984, Zhou studied physical education at the Shanghai Physical Education Institute, earning a bachelor's degree in 1986.

In 1991, Zhou left China to work on a master's degree in English at George Washington University. Zhou served as a volleyball coach at George Washington.

In 2014, Zhou started her own girls volleyball club, the East Coast Elite, which is located in Howard County, Maryland, where she currently coaches.

== Awards ==
=== National team ===
- 1981 World Cup - Gold Medal
- 1982 World Championship - Gold Medal
- 1984 Los Angeles Olympic Games - Gold Medal
