= Miyoko Hirose =

Japanese volleyball player (born 1959)

Personal information
- Born: 5 March 1959 (age 67); Kobe, Hyogo, Japan
- Height: 1.70 m (5 ft 7 in)

Volleyball information
- Position: Opposite
- Number: 4

National team
1981–1984	Japan
Honours
Women's volleyball
Representing Japan
Olympic Games
Bronze medal – third place	1984 Los Angeles	Team
FIVB World Cup
Silver medal – second place	1981 Japan
Asian Games
Silver medal – second place	1982 New Delhi	Team

Miyoko Hirose (広瀬 美代子 Hirose Miyoko, born 5 March 1959) is a former volleyball player from Japan who was a member of the Japan women's national team that won the bronze medal at the 1984 Summer Olympics in Los Angeles.

== National team ==
- 1982: 4th place in the World Championship
- 1984: 3rd place in the Olympic Games of Los Angeles
