= Volleyball at the 1982 Asian Games – Men's tournament =

Men at the 1982 Asian Games
- Venue: Indraprashtha Indoor Stadium
- Date: 20 November – 3 December 1982
- Nations: 15

Medalists
gold medal	Japan
silver medal	China
bronze medal	South Korea

The 1982 Men's Asian Games Volleyball Tournament was held in New Delhi, India from 20 November to 3 December 1982.

== Results ==
=== Preliminary round ===
==== Pool A ====
Pos	Team	Pld	W	L	Pts	SW	SL	SR	SPW	SPL	SPR	Qualification
1	India	3	3	0	6	9	2	4.500	152	100	1.520	Final round
2	Indonesia	3	2	1	5	7	4	1.750	146	106	1.377	Classification 5th–8th
3	Saudi Arabia	3	1	2	4	5	6	0.833	124	130	0.954	Classification 9th–12th
4	Bangladesh	3	0	3	3	0	9	0.000	49	135	0.363	Classification 13th–15th

Source: Results

Date		Score		Set 1	Set 2	Set 3	Set 4	Set 5	Total
20 Nov	India	3–0	Bangladesh	15–1	15–1	15–2			45–4
21 Nov	Saudi Arabia	1–3	Indonesia	5–15	7–15	15–7	5–15		32–52
22 Nov	Indonesia	3–0	Bangladesh	15–10	15–7	15–7			45–24
23 Nov	India	3–1	Indonesia	15–8	4–15	16–14	15–12		50–49
24 Nov	Saudi Arabia	3–0	Bangladesh	15–7	15–8	15–6			45–21
25 Nov	India	3–1	Saudi Arabia	15–12	11–15	16–14	15–6		57–47

==== Pool B ====
Pos	Team	Pld	W	L	Pts	SW	SL	SR	SPW	SPL	SPR	Qualification
1	South Korea	2	2	0	4	6	0	MAX	90	16	5.625	Final round
2	Kuwait	2	1	1	3	3	3	1.000	59	55	1.073	Classification 5th–8th
3	Nepal	2	0	2	2	0	6	0.000	12	90	0.133	Classification 9th–12th

Source: Results

Date		Score		Set 1	Set 2	Set 3	Set 4	Set 5	Total
20 Nov	South Korea	3–0	Nepal	15–2	15–0	15–0			45–2
23 Nov	South Korea	3–0	Kuwait	15–5	15–7	15–2			45–14
24 Nov	Kuwait	3–0	Nepal	15–2	15–4	15–4			45–10

==== Pool C ====
Pos	Team	Pld	W	L	Pts	SW	SL	SR	SPW	SPL	SPR	Qualification
1	Japan	3	3	0	6	9	0	MAX	135	24	5.625	Final round
2	Qatar	3	2	1	5	6	5	1.200	120	141	0.851	Classification 5th–8th
3	South Yemen	3	1	2	4	4	7	0.571	112	140	0.800	Classification 9th–12th
4	Hong Kong	3	0	3	3	2	9	0.222	94	156	0.603	Classification 13th–15th

Source: Results

Date		Score		Set 1	Set 2	Set 3	Set 4	Set 5	Total
20 Nov	Hong Kong	1–3	Qatar	13–15	15–11	13–15	8–15		49–56
21 Nov	Hong Kong	1–3	South Yemen	5–15	15–10	6–15	11–15		37–55
22 Nov	Qatar	3–1	South Yemen	15–9	13–15	15–12	15–11		58–47
23 Nov	Japan	3–0	Qatar	15–0	15–5	15–1			45–6
24 Nov	Japan	3–0	Hong Kong	15–3	15–0	15–5			45–8
25 Nov	Japan	3–0	South Yemen	15–1	15–2	15–6			45–10

==== Pool D ====
Pos	Team	Pld	W	L	Pts	SW	SL	SR	SPW	SPL	SPR	Qualification
1	China	3	3	0	6	9	0	MAX	135	17	7.941	Final round
2	Iraq	3	2	1	5	6	3	2.000	98	71	1.380	Classification 5th–8th
3	North Yemen	3	1	2	4	3	6	0.500	68	101	0.673	Classification 9th–12th
4	Maldives	3	0	3	3	0	9	0.000	23	135	0.170	Classification 13th–15th

Source: Results

Date		Score		Set 1	Set 2	Set 3	Set 4	Set 5	Total
20 Nov	Iraq	3–0	Maldives	15–4	15–3	15–4			45–11
21 Nov	China	3–0	Iraq	15–4	15–1	15–3			45–8
22 Nov	North Yemen	3–0	Maldives	15–2	15–5	15–4			45–11
23 Nov	China	3–0	North Yemen	15–2	15–5	15–1			45–8
24 Nov	China	3–0	Maldives	15–0	15–1	15–0			45–1
25 Nov	Iraq	3–0	North Yemen	15–1	15–5	15–9			45–15

=== Classification 13th–15th ===
Pos	Team	Pld	W	L	Pts	SW	SL	SR	SPW	SPL	SPR
1	Bangladesh	2	2	0	4	6	1	6.000	100	52	1.923
2	Hong Kong	2	1	1	3	4	3	1.333	89	76	1.171
3	Maldives	2	0	2	2	0	6	0.000	29	90	0.322

Source: Results

Date		Score		Set 1	Set 2	Set 3	Set 4	Set 5	Total
27 Nov	Bangladesh	3–1	Hong Kong	9–15	16–14	15–13	15–2		55–44
28 Nov	Hong Kong	3–0	Maldives	15–4	15–7	15–10			45–21
29 Nov	Bangladesh	3–0	Maldives	15–1	15–4	15–3			45–8

=== Classification 9th–12th ===
Pos	Team	Pld	W	L	Pts	SW	SL	SR	SPW	SPL	SPR
1	Saudi Arabia	3	3	0	6	9	0	MAX	135	50	2.700
2	South Yemen	3	2	1	5	6	4	1.500	121	117	1.034
3	North Yemen	3	1	2	4	4	7	0.571	112	150	0.747
4	Nepal	3	0	3	3	1	9	0.111	97	148	0.655

Source: Results

Date		Score		Set 1	Set 2	Set 3	Set 4	Set 5	Total
27 Nov	Nepal	0–3	South Yemen	11–15	8–15	11–15			30–45
28 Nov	Saudi Arabia	3–0	North Yemen	15–0	15–9	15–3			45–12
29 Nov	South Yemen	3–1	North Yemen	15–11	14–16	15–5	15–10		59–42
30 Nov	Saudi Arabia	3–0	Nepal	15–8	15–6	15–7			45–21
01 Dec	Saudi Arabia	3–0	South Yemen	15–4	15–2	15–11			45–17
01 Dec	Nepal	1–3	North Yemen	15–13	11–15	10–15	10–15		46–58

=== Classification 5th–8th ===
Pos	Team	Pld	W	L	Pts	SW	SL	SR	SPW	SPL	SPR
1	Iraq	3	3	0	6	9	2	4.500	160	90	1.778
2	Indonesia	3	2	1	5	7	3	2.333	124	113	1.097
3	Kuwait	3	1	2	4	4	6	0.667	122	120	1.017
4	Qatar	3	0	3	3	0	9	0.000	52	135	0.385

Source: Results

Date		Score		Set 1	Set 2	Set 3	Set 4	Set 5	Total
27 Nov	Kuwait	1–3	Iraq	13–15	7–15	15–13	4–15		39–58
28 Nov	Indonesia	3–0	Qatar	15–7	15–5	15–6			45–18
29 Nov	Qatar	0–3	Iraq	5–15	9–15	6–15			20–45
30 Nov	Indonesia	3–0	Kuwait	15–11	18–16	15–11			48–38
01 Dec	Indonesia	1–3	Iraq	9–15	15–12	6–15	1–15		31–57
02 Dec	Kuwait	3–0	Qatar	15–2	15–5	15–7			45–14

=== Final round ===
Pos	Team	Pld	W	L	Pts	SW	SL	SR	SPW	SPL	SPR
1	Japan	3	3	0	6	9	1	9.000	144	92	1.565
2	China	3	2	1	5	6	5	1.200	146	126	1.159
3	South Korea	3	1	2	4	6	6	1.000	155	150	1.033
4	India	3	0	3	3	0	9	0.000	60	137	0.438

Source: Results

Date		Score		Set 1	Set 2	Set 3	Set 4	Set 5	Total
29 Nov	South Korea	2–3	China	11–15	18–16	15–10	7–15	8–15	59–71
29 Nov	India	0–3	Japan	1–15	3–15	9–15			13–45
30 Nov	South Korea	1–3	Japan	9–15	13–15	15–9	12–15		49–54
02 Dec	India	0–3	China	12–15	7–15	3–15			22–45
03 Dec	India	0–3	South Korea	6–15	4–15	15–17			25–47
03 Dec	Japan	3–0	China	15–6	15–11	15–13			45–30

== Final standing ==
Rank	Team	Pld	W	L
1st place, gold medalist(s)	Japan	6	6	0
2nd place, silver medalist(s)	China	6	5	1
3rd place, bronze medalist(s)	South Korea	5	3	2
4	India	6	3	3
5	Iraq	6	5	1
6	Indonesia	6	4	2
7	Kuwait	5	2	3
8	Qatar	6	2	4
9	Saudi Arabia	6	4	2
10	South Yemen	6	3	3
11	North Yemen	6	2	4
12	Nepal	5	0	5
13	Bangladesh	5	2	3
14	Hong Kong	5	1	4
15	Maldives	5	0	5
