= Volleyball at the 1983 Pan American Games =

This page presents the results of the men's and women's volleyball tournament during the 1983 Pan American Games, which was held from August 17 to August 27, 1983 in Caracas, Venezuela.

== Men's indoor tournament ==
=== Final Round ===
Semifinals
1983-08-25 – Caracas
Brazil | 3
United States | 0
1983-08-25 – Caracas
Cuba | 3
Argentina | 0

Final
1983-08-27 – Caracas
Brazil | 3
Cuba | 1
3rd Place
1983-08-27 – Caracas
United States | 0
Argentina | 3

=== Final ranking ===
| Place | Team |
|---|---|
| 1. | Brazil |
| 2. | Cuba |
| 3. | Argentina |
| 4. | United States |
| 5. | Canada |
| 6. | Venezuela |
| 7. | Puerto Rico |

1983 Pan American Games winners

Brazil
Second title

== Women's indoor tournament ==
=== Final Round ===
Semifinals
1983-08-25 – Caracas
Cuba | 3
Peru | 0
1983-08-25 – Caracas
United States | 3
Brazil | 0

Final
1983-08-26 – Caracas
Cuba | 3
United States | 2
3rd Place
1983-08-26 – Caracas
Peru | 3
Brazil | 1

=== Final ranking ===
| Place | Team |
|---|---|
| 1. | Cuba |
| 2. | United States |
| 3. | Peru |
| 4. | Brazil |
| 5. | Canada |
| 6. | Argentina |
| 7. | Venezuela |

1983 Pan American Games winners

Cuba
Fourth title
