= Volleyball at the 1982 Asian Games – Women's tournament =

Women at the 1982 Asian Games
- Venue: Indraprashtha Indoor Stadium
- Date: 20 November – 3 December 1982
- Nations: 6

Medalists
gold medal	China
silver medal	Japan
bronze medal	South Korea

The 1982 Women's Asian Games Volleyball Tournament was held in New Delhi, India from 20 November to 3 December 1982.

== Results ==
Pos	Team	Pld	W	L	Pts	SW	SL	SR	SPW	SPL	SPR
1	China	5	5	0	10	15	0	MAX	225	75	3.000
2	Japan	5	4	1	9	12	3	4.000	206	105	1.962
3	South Korea	5	3	2	8	9	7	1.286	185	138	1.341
4	North Korea	5	2	3	7	7	9	0.778	173	167	1.036
5	Philippines	5	1	4	6	3	12	0.250	83	210	0.395
6	India	5	0	5	5	0	15	0.000	48	225	0.213

Source: Results

Date		Score		Set 1	Set 2	Set 3	Set 4	Set 5	Total
20 Nov	India	0–3	North Korea	4–15	1–15	4–15			9–45
21 Nov	Japan	3–0	Philippines	15–6	15–7	15–0			45–13
22 Nov	China	3–0	South Korea	15–4	15–8	15–6			45–18
24 Nov	Japan	3–0	India	15–1	15–3	15–1			45–5
25 Nov	China	3–0	Philippines	15–2	15–1	15–2			45–5
25 Nov	South Korea	3–1	North Korea	8–15	15–5	15–11	15–10		53–41
27 Nov	China	3–0	India	15–0	15–0	15–2			45–2
29 Nov	South Korea	3–0	Philippines	15–1	15–2	15–2			45–5
30 Nov	Japan	3–0	North Korea	15–9	15–5	15–4			45–18
30 Nov	South Korea	3–0	India	15–0	15–2	15–0			45–2
01 Dec	China	3–0	North Korea	15–11	15–1	15–12			45–24
02 Dec	North Korea	3–0	Philippines	15–2	15–12	15–1			45–15
02 Dec	Japan	3–0	South Korea	15–10	15–10	15–4			45–24
03 Dec	India	0–3	Philippines	9–15	9–15	12–15			30–45
03 Dec	China	3–0	Japan	15–12	15–5	15–9			45–26

== Final standing ==
Rank	Team	Pld	W	L
1st place, gold medalist(s)	China	5	5	0
2nd place, silver medalist(s)	Japan	5	4	1
3rd place, bronze medalist(s)	South Korea	5	3	2
4	North Korea	5	2	3
5	Philippines	5	1	4
6	India	5	0	5
