= Volleyball at the 1986 Asian Games – Women's tournament =

Women at the 1986 Asian Games
- Venue: Hanyang University Gymnasium
- Date: 27 September – 3 October 1986
- Nations: 5

Medalists
gold medal	China
silver medal	Japan
bronze medal	South Korea

The women's volleyball tournament at the 1986 Asian Games was held from 27 September to 3 October, 1986 in Seoul, South Korea.

== Results ==
Pos	Team	Pld	W	L	Pts	SW	SL	SR	SPW	SPL	SPR
1	China	4	4	0	8	12	0	MAX	180	54	3.333
2	Japan	4	3	1	7	9	3	3.000	162	78	2.077
3	South Korea	4	2	2	6	6	6	1.000	131	103	1.272
4	Thailand	4	1	3	5	3	11	0.273	85	189	0.450
5	Indonesia	4	0	4	4	2	12	0.167	68	202	0.337

Source: Results

Date		Score		Set 1	Set 2	Set 3	Set 4	Set 5	Total
27 Sep	Thailand	3–2	Indonesia	15–17	15–5	7–15	15–5	15–12	67–54
27 Sep	South Korea	0–3	Japan	6–15	7–15	12–15			25–45
28 Sep	South Korea	3–0	Thailand	15–2	15–3	15–0			45–5
28 Sep	China	3–0	Japan	15–13	15–9	15–5			45–27
30 Sep	Thailand	0–3	China	1–15	5–15	1–15			7–45
30 Sep	South Korea	3–0	Indonesia	15–0	15–3	15–5			45–8
01 Oct	China	3–0	Indonesia	15–1	15–3	15–0			45–4
01 Oct	Japan	3–0	Thailand	15–3	15–3	15–0			45–6
03 Oct	Indonesia	0–3	Japan	0–15	1–15	1–15			2–45
03 Oct	South Korea	0–3	China	7–15	2–15	7–15			16–45

== Final standing ==
Rank	Team	Pld	W	L
1st place, gold medalist(s)	China	4	4	0
2nd place, silver medalist(s)	Japan	4	3	1
3rd place, bronze medalist(s)	South Korea	4	2	2
4	Thailand	4	1	3
5	Indonesia	4	0	4
