= List of Asian Games medalists in volleyball =

This is the complete list of Asian Games medalists in volleyball from 1958 to 2026.

== Volleyball ==
=== Men ===
Games	Gold	Silver	Bronze
1958 Tokyo	Japan (JPN); Yutaka Demachi; Masashi Fukagawa; Toshio Kawamura; Tadanao Koizumi; Tsutomu Koyama; Motoo Maruya; Shoichi Mukai; Kaoru Noguchi; Tomoyoshi Sakahashi; Nobuhide Sato; Yoshikazu Tsuda; Masahiro Yoshida	Iran (IRN); Mahmoud Adl; Mohammad Sharifzadeh; Abbas Tehrani; Abdolmonem Kamal; Siavash Farrokhi; Hossein Ali Amiri; Kamal Pourhashemi; Mohammad Esmaeil Ashtari	India (IND); T. R. Arunchalam; S. L. Gupta; P. Bharathan Nair; T. P. Padmanabhan Nair; Abdur Rahman; Raman; S. K. Sheikuchan; Gurdev Singh
1962 Jakarta	Japan (JPN); Yutaka Demachi; Masashi Fukagawa; Hirokuni Hara; Tadayoshi Ichikawa; Matsuo Kawasaki; Tsutomu Koyama; Masayuki Minami; Teruhisa Moriyama; Yasutaka Sato; Sadatoshi Sugawara; Nobuhisa Takada; Masahiro Yamaguchi	India (IND); Nripjit Singh Bedi; Tilakam Gopal; Joseph; Jai Karan; Khalid; Munnalal; T. P. Padmanabhan Nair; A. Palanisamy; Des Raj; Jaswant Singh	Pakistan (PAK); Mirza Aziz Ahmed Baig; Faiz Ahmed Bodla; Nazar Farid; Sikandar Hayat; Abdul Khaliq Khan; Riaz Maluk; Nasim Mirza; Noor Muhammad; Rab Nawaz; Muhammad Rafiq; Ghulam Rasool; Muhammad Sharif
1966 Bangkok	Japan (JPN); Takeshi Furukawa; Naohiro Ikeda; Kenji Kimura; Isao Koizumi; Masayuki Minami; Jungo Morita; Teruhisa Moriyama; Yuzo Nakamura; Katsutoshi Nekoda; Mamoru Shiragami; Tadayoshi Yokota	South Korea (KOR); Choi Jong-ok; Chung Kwang-soo; Chung Sun-hung; Jin Jun-tak; Kim Jin-hee; Kim Sung-kil; Kim Young-dae; Kim Young-hwan; Kim Young-nam; Lim Tae-ho; Oh Chan-suk; Park Su-kwang	Iran (IRN); Changiz Ansari; Khosro Ebrahim; Mohammad Hemmatyar; Hassan Kabiri; Mohammad Hassan Kord; Mojtaba Mortazavi; Mahmoud Motlagh; Khalil Paknazar; Masoud Salehieh
1970 Bangkok	Japan (JPN); Yoshihide Fukao; Kenji Kimura; Isao Koizumi; Yasuaki Mitsumori; Jungo Morita; Yuzo Nakamura; Katsutoshi Nekoda; Keiichi Numakura; Seiji Oko; Tetsuo Sato; Kenji Shimaoka; Tadayoshi Yokota	South Korea (KOR); Cho Jae-hak; Chung Dong-kee; Jin Jun-tak; Kim Chung-han; Kim Kil-tae; Kim Kun-bong; Kim Young-dae; Kim Young-nam; Lee Choun-pyo; Lee Sun-koo; Lee Yong-kwan; Woo Chul-woo	Republic of China (ROC); Chen Chiang-shui; Chou Lung-hsiung; Hu Chung-ming; Hu Wen-hsiung; Su Shui-sheng; Sun Chia-hsiung; Tang Shan-pen; Wang I-hsiang; Yang Kao-ping
1974 Tehran	Japan (JPN); Yoshihide Fukao; Kenji Kimura; Yuzo Nakamura; Katsutoshi Nekoda; Tetsuo Nishimoto; Katsumi Oda; Tetsuo Sato; Kenji Shimaoka; Mikiyasu Tanaka; Shoichi Yanagimoto; Yasunori Yasuda; Tadayoshi Yokota	South Korea (KOR); Chung Kang-sup; Jin Jun-tak; Kang Man-soo; Kim Chung-han; Kim Kun-bong; Lee Choun-pyo; Lee In; Lee Sun-koo; Lee Yong-kwan; Park Ki-won; Suk Kyung-hong	China (CHN); Chen Fulin; Dong Chuanqiang; Fu Yuting; Jiang Shensheng; Wang Chuan; Wang Dexue; Yu Youwei; Yuan Liubin; Yuan Weimin; Zhang Yuan; Zhao Chengqing; Zhu Jiaming
1978 Bangkok	South Korea (KOR); Cha Joo-hyun; Chang Yoon-chang; Chung Kang-sup; Kang Doo-tae; Kang Man-soo; Kim Ho-chul; Kim Kab-je; Lee Hee-wan; Lee In; Moon Yong-kwan; Park Ki-won; Yoo Joong-tak	Japan (JPN); Haruhiko Hanawa; Shohei Iwatsuki; Yoshio Kobayashi; Takashi Maruyama; Katsutoshi Nekoda; Tetsuo Nishimoto; Katsumi Oda; Kenji Shimaoka; Mikiyasu Tanaka; Yoshinori Tanaka; Shinichiro Tsujiai	China (CHN); Chen Fulin; Chen Gang; Hou Jie; Hu Jin; Li Jianxin; Wang Jiawei; Wang Qingheng; Xu Zhen; Zheng Zongyuan; Zhou Zhongyu
1982 New Delhi	Japan (JPN); Yukimitsu Fujita; Yasushi Furukawa; Haruhiko Hanawa; Minoru Iwata; Kazuya Mitake; Eizaburo Mitsuhashi; Hiroaki Okuno; Koshi Sobu; Kimio Sugimoto; Mikiyasu Tanaka; Naoki Tanaka; Shuji Yamada	China (CHN); Cao Ping; Chen Fulin; Chen Gang; Guo Ming; Hou Xiaofei; Hu Jin; Pan Lijun; Wang Jiawei; Wang Tieshan; Xu Zhen; Xue Yongye; Yu Yansen	South Korea (KOR); Chang Yoon-chang; Han Jang-sok; Kang Doo-tae; Kang Man-soo; Kim Hyung-tae; Kim In-ok; Kim Kyung-un; Kim Sang-bo; Lee Bum-joo; Lee Jong-kyung; Moon Yong-kwan; Yoo Joong-tak
1986 Seoul	China (CHN); Jiang Jie; Ju Genyin; Liu Changcheng; Lu Cheng; Ma Jun; Song Jinwei; Wang Jiawei; Yang Liqun; Yu Yiqing; Zhang Renjiang; Zhao Duo; Zuo Yue	South Korea (KOR); Chang Yoon-chang; Choi Cheon-sik; Han Jang-sok; Kang Doo-tae; Kim Ho-chul; Lee Chae-on; Lee Jong-kyung; Moon Yong-kwan; Nam Sang-sun; No Jin-su; Yoo Joong-tak; Yang Jin-wung	India (IND); Abdul Basith; Jimmy George; Shaikh Kareemullah; Kirtesh Kumar; P. V. Ramana; Dalel Singh Ror; Sandeep Sharma; Mehar Singh; Sukhpal Singh; G. E. Sridharan; K. Udayakumar; Cyril C. Valloor
1990 Beijing	China (CHN); Cao Maowen; Jiang Jie; Ju Genyin; Li Haiyun; Su Xuehui; Weng Yiqing; Wu Wei; Xu Guorong; Yan Feng; Zhang Jianwei; Zhang Renjiang; Zhou Jianan	South Korea (KOR); Chang Yoon-chang; Chung Euy-tak; Ha Jong-hwa; Han Jang-sok; Hong Hae-cheon; Lee Kyung-suk; Lee Sang-yeol; Ma Nak-gil; No Jin-su; Park Sam-ryong; Shin Young-chul; Yoon Jong-il	Japan (JPN); Shigeru Aoyama; Masayoshi Manabe; Katsuyuki Minami; Yuichi Nakagaichi; Takashi Narita; Masaji Ogino; Hideyuki Otake; Masafumi Oura; Satoshi Sensui; Yuji Takeda; Tatsuya Ueta
1994 Hiroshima	Japan (JPN); Shigeru Aoyama; Masayuki Izumikawa; Hideaki Kobayashi; Akihiko Matsuda; Katsuyuki Minami; Norihiko Miyazaki; Yuichi Nakagaichi; Takashi Narita; Hideyuki Otake; Masafumi Oura; Taichi Sasaki; Kenji Yamamoto	China (CHN); Chen Feng; Hou Jing; Li Haiyun; Lu Weizhong; Weng Yiqing; Xie Guochen; Yan Feng; Zhang Di; Zhang Liming; Zhang Xiang; Zheng Liang; Zhou Jianan	South Korea (KOR); Ha Jong-hwa; Im Do-hun; Jae Hee-kyung; Kim Byung-sun; Kim Chul-soo; Kim Sang-woo; Kim Se-jin; Lee Sung-hee; Park Hee-sang; Park Jong-chan; Park Sam-ryong; Shin Young-chul
1998 Bangkok	China (CHN); Chen Fang; Chen Qi; An Jiajie; Li Tieming; Lu Weizhong; Wang Hebing; Zhang Liming; Zhang Xiang; Zhao Yong; Zheng Liang; Zhou Jianan; Zhu Gang	South Korea (KOR); Bang Ji-sub; Bang Sin-bong; Chang Byung-chul; Kim Kyoung-hoon; Kim Sang-woo; Kim Se-jin; Kim Sung-chae; Lee Ho; Lee Kyung-soo; Park Hee-sang; Park Sun-chool; Shin Jin-sik	Chinese Taipei (TPE); Chang En-chung; Cheng Chien-min; Cheng Hsiao-tsun; Chiang Wei-lin; Chiu Te-chuan; Li Chen-man; Lin Hung-nien; Lin Hsien-chen; Lin Yu-hao; Liu Yu-yi; Wu Chih-min; Wu Chung-cheng
2002 Busan	South Korea (KOR); Shin Jin-sik; Kim Se-jin; Park Jae-han; Yeo Oh-hyun; Choi Tae-woong; Kim Sang-woo; Bang Sin-bong; Shin Sun-ho; Lee Kyung-soo; Suk Jin-wook; Kwon Young-min; Chang Byung-chul	Iran (IRI); Amir Hossein Monazzami; Amir Hosseini; Abbas Ghasemian; Peyman Akbari; Mohammad Mansouri; Ahsanollah Shirkavand; Mahmoud Afshardoust; Behnam Mahmoudi; Mohammad Torkashvand; Afshin Oliaei; Alireza Behboudi; Rahman Mohammadirad	Japan (JPN); Kenji Yamamoto; Mitsuaki Utena; Yuichiro Sawahata; Masayuki Izumikawa; Yukito Tokumoto; Naoki Morokuma; Masahiro Miyashita; Takamasa Suzuki; Daisuke Usami; Takehiro Kihara; Kota Yamamura; Yu Koshikawa
2006 Doha	South Korea (KOR); Shin Jin-sik; Kwon Young-min; Moon Sung-min; Yeo Oh-hyun; Song Byung-il; Lee Sun-kyu; Who In-jung; Yun Bong-woo; Lee Kyung-soo; Kim Yo-han; Ha Kyoung-min; Chang Byung-chul	China (CHN); Cui Xiaodong; Yuan Zhi; Guo Peng; Wang Haichuan; Tang Miao; Cui Jianjun; Li Chun; Yu Dawei; Shen Qiong; Jiang Fudong; Ren Qi; Sui Shengsheng	Saudi Arabia (KSA); Ahmed Al-Bakhit; Naif Al-Buhassoun; Yahya Hanash; Ibrahim Al-Harbi; Abdullah Al-Bahli; Sharif Al-Khalifa; Khalil Hajji; Thamer Al-Dossari; Khalid Ozaibi; Ismail Al-Khaibari; Masfer Al-Bishi; Yasser Al-Makawni
2010 Guangzhou	Japan (JPN); Akio Nagae; Takeshi Nagano; Naoya Suga; Daisuke Usami; Yoshifumi Suzuki; Yuya Ageba; Takaaki Tomimatsu; Kota Yamamura; Kunihiro Shimizu; Tatsuya Fukuzawa; Yusuke Ishijima; Yuta Yoneyama	Iran (IRI); Adel Gholami; Mojtaba Attar; Saeid Marouf; Mohammad Mousavi; Hamzeh Zarini; Alireza Nadi; Mohsen Andalib; Farhad Nazari Afshar; Mehdi Mahdavi; Arash Keshavarzi; Mohammad Mohammadkazem; Arash Kamalvand	South Korea (KOR); Shin Young-soo; Han Sun-soo; Kwon Young-min; Moon Sung-min; Yeo Oh-hyun; Kim Hak-min; Kim Yo-han; Ko Hee-jin; Park Chul-woo; Suk Jin-wook; Ha Hyun-yong; Shin Yung-suk
2014 Incheon	Iran (IRI); Shahram Mahmoudi; Milad Ebadipour; Saeid Marouf; Farhad Ghaemi; Mohammad Mousavi; Pouria Fayazi; Farhad Zarif; Adel Gholami; Amir Ghafour; Mojtaba Mirzajanpour; Mehdi Mahdavi; Armin Tashakkori	Japan (JPN); Kunihiro Shimizu; Shohei Uchiyama; Yu Koshikawa; Ryusuke Tsubakiyama; Masahiro Yanagida; Akihiro Yamauchi; Hideomi Fukatsu; Yuki Ishikawa; Takashi Dekita; Takeshi Nagano; Yuta Yoneyama; Yamato Fushimi	South Korea (KOR); Song Myung-geun; Han Sun-soo; Shin Yung-suk; Lee Min-gyu; Park Sang-ha; Kwak Seung-suk; Bu Yong-chan; Choi Min-ho; Jeon Kwang-in; Park Chul-woo; Seo Jae-duck; Jeong Min-su
2018 Jakarta–Palembang	Iran (IRI); Milad Ebadipour; Saman Faezi; Saeid Marouf; Farhad Ghaemi; Mohammad Mousavi; Amir Ghafour; Saber Kazemi; Mohammad Javad Manavinejad; Ali Shafiei; Mohammad Taher Vadi; Mehdi Marandi; Morteza Sharifi; Mohammad Reza Hazratpour; Amir Hossein Toukhteh	South Korea (KOR); Song Myung-geun; Han Sun-soo; Seo Jae-duck; Jeong Min-su; Bu Yong-chan; Lee Min-gyu; Kim Kyu-min; Na Gyeong-bok; Kwak Seung-suk; Jung Ji-seok; Choi Min-ho; Jeon Kwang-in; Moon Sung-min; Kim Jae-hwi	Chinese Taipei (TPE); Lin Cheng-yang; Liu Hong-jie; Li Chia-hsuan; Huang Shih-hao; Tai Ju-chien; Liu Hung-min; Su Hou-chen; Wu Tsung-hsuan; Hsu Mei-chung; Huang Chien-feng; Lin Yi-huei; Wang Chien-pin; Shih Hsiu-chih; Chen Chien-chen
2022 Hangzhou	Iran (IRI); Mehdi Jelveh; Mohammad Mousavi; Mohammad Reza Hazratpour; Amin Esmaeilnejad; Saber Kazemi; Amir Hossein Esfandiar; Javad Karimi; Meisam Salehi; Mohammad Taher Vadi; Pouria Khanzadeh; Shahrouz Homayounfarmanesh; Mohammad Valizadeh	China (CHN); Wang Dongchen; Jiang Chuan; Wang Hebin; Yu Yuantai; Yu Yaochen; Li Yongzhen; Peng Shikun; Qu Zongshuai; Zhang Guanhua; Zhang Jingyin; Wang Bin; Dai Qingyao	Japan (JPN); Akihiro Fukatsu; Kenta Takanashi; Masahiro Yanagida; Hiroto Nishiyama; Kazuyuki Takahashi; Takahiro Namba; Akito Yamazaki; Keihan Takahashi; Kento Asano; Yudai Arai; Hirohito Kashimura
2026 Aichi–Nagoya	Iran (IRI); Mobin Nasri; Poriya Hossein Khanzadeh; Amin Esmaeilnezhad; Ilshan Davoodipour; Arshia Behnezhad; Ali Hajipour; Hossein Haji Kalateh; Yousef Kazemi; Ali Haghparast; Mohammad Valizadeh; Morteza Sharifi; Eisa Nasseri	Japan (JPN); Tatsunori Otsuka; Yudai Arai; Yudai Kawahigashi; Masato Kai; Keigo Nishimoto; Hiroto Nishiyama; Keihan Takahashi; Ryo Shimokawa; Rikuto Goto; Kento Asano; Keitaro Nishikawa; Kazuyuki Takahashi	Pakistan; Muhammad Hamad; Jabran Jabran; Abu Bakar Siddique; Muhammad Yahya; Usman Faryad Ali; Fahad Raza; Murad Khan; Khizar Hayat; Murad Jehan; Afaq Khan; Hamid Yazman; Musawer Khan

=== Women ===
Games	Gold	Silver	Bronze
1962 Jakarta	Japan (JPN); Miyoko Kodama; Masako Kondo; Eiko Maeda; Kazuko Okunaga; Terumi Sasamoto; Ayano Shibuki; Yukiko Tanaka; Shigeko Yamaguchi; Setsuko Yoshida; Yu Yoshinaka	South Korea (KOR); Choi Myung-ja; Jo Dong-ryong; Joo Bang-ja; Kim Ke-hwan; Kim Koon-ja; Kim Yung-bong; Lee Choon-il; Lee Jae-soon; Lee Yung-ja; Ryoo Choon-ja; Suh Choon-kang; Yoo Myung-ja	Indonesia (INA); Evy Sofia Achid; Jane Gunawan; Paulina Lessil; Helena Marwati; Joan Paulini; Rasni Rasmo; Lenny Sahertian; Augustien Siahaija; Hartaty Soekardjo; Amy Surjotjokro; Tan Lan Ing; Tjia Boet Nio
1966 Bangkok	Japan (JPN); Makiko Furukawa; Keiko Hama; Takako Hino; Noriko Honda; Rumiko Igarashi; Takako Iida; Michiko Ito; Nobuko Kishida; Yukiyo Kojima; Hisae Matsumoto; Sonomi Sakai; Michiko Saotome	South Korea (KOR); Choi Jung-sook; Hong Nam-sun; Huh Joo-ok; Hwang Kyu-ok; Kim Koon-ja; Lee Choon-il; Lee Keun-soo; Moon Kyung-sook; Ryoo Choon-ja; Suh Hee-sook; Yang Jin-soo; Yoo Myung-ja	Iran (IRN); Leila Emami; Pari Fardi; Mina Fathi; Mehri Kharrazi; Ozra Malek; Rouhi Pandnavaz; Jaleh Seyed-Hadizadeh; Nasrin Shokoufi; Mary Terez Tot
1970 Bangkok	Japan (JPN); Toshimi Furuta; Keiko Hama; Takako Iida; Toyoko Iwahara; Hiroko Jinnouchi; Kajiko Kitajima; Machiko Kunitimo; Fumie Matsushita; Hisako Nagano; Aiko Onozawa; Takako Shirai; Eiko Sugawara	South Korea (KOR); Choi Duk-kyung; Jo Hea-jung; Kang Mi-hwa; Kim Hei-sook; Kim Young-ja; Lee In-sook; Lee Kyung-sun; Lee Soon-bok; Suh Han-sook; Suh Hyun-sook; Yang Jin-soo; Yoon Young-nae	Khmer Republic (KHM); Chan Leang Chhiv; Chau Chan; Chhouk Vanna; Eap Sodanep; Pao Yoeun; Ten Sem; Tep Kim Heng; Vor Onn
1974 Tehran	Japan (JPN); Yuko Arakida; Toshimi Furuta; Takako Iida; Katsuko Kanesaka; Kiyomi Kato; Echiko Maeda; Noriko Matsuda; Mariko Okamoto; Harue Saito; Takako Shirai; Hiromi Yano; Juri Yokoyama	South Korea (KOR); Choi Eun-hee; Jo Hea-jung; Jung Soon-ok; Lee Hyo-sun; Lee Kyung-sook; Lee Kyung-sun; Lee Soon-bok; Noh Chang-hee; Park In-sil; Park Jung-hui; Yu Jung-hye; Yu Kyung-hwa	China (CHN); Cao Jinxiu; Fan Guixiang; Ge Weiping; Liang Caihui; Liu Di; Qi Lixia; Wu Guoying; Xu Liyun; Xu Xiumei; Yu Liwen; Zhang Qingru; Zhang Shuhua
1978 Bangkok	Japan (JPN); Yumi Egami; Yoshie Ishikawa; Yoko Kawamata; Kazuko Ogawa; Keiko Okushima; Kayoko Sudo; Juri Yokoyama; Terie Yuki	China (CHN); Chen Zhaodi; Han Xiaohua; Lang Ping; Li Wenxiu; Qi Lixia; Sun Jinfang; Yang Xi; Zhang Jieyun; Zhang Rongfang; Zhou Xiaolan	South Korea (KOR); Baik Myung-sun; Byon Kyung-ja; Kim Ae-hee; Kim Hwa-bok; Kwak Sun-ok; Kweon In-sook; Lim Hae-sook; Shim Soon-ok; Shin Sang-sun; Yang Soon-duk; Yoon Young-nae; Yu Kyung-hwa
1982 New Delhi	China (CHN); Cao Huiying; Chen Yaqiong; Chen Zhaodi; Jiang Ying; Lang Ping; Liang Yan; Sun Jinfang; Yang Xi; Yang Xilan; Zhang Rongfang; Zheng Meizhu; Zhou Xiaolan	Japan (JPN); Yumi Egami; Yayumi Hara; Miyoko Hirose; Kyoko Ishida; Yuko Mitsuya; Kimie Morita; Kumi Nakada; Emiko Odaka; Noriko Ogihara; Kayoko Sugiyama; Hitomi Suzuki; Mikiko Wako	South Korea (KOR); Han Kyung-ae; Jeong Keum-sun; Jin Chun-mae; Kim Jeong-sun; Kim Song-eun; Kim Young-sook; Kwak Sun-ok; Lee Eun-kyung; Lee Un-yim; Lee Young-sun; Nam Myung-ye; Park Mi-hee
1986 Seoul	China (CHN); Hou Yuzhu; Hu Xiaofeng; Jiang Ying; Li Yanjun; Liang Yan; Liu Wei; Su Huijuan; Wu Dan; Yang Xilan; Yang Xiaojun; Yin Qin; Zheng Meizhu	Japan (JPN); Norie Hiro; Tomoe Hongo; Naomi Masuko; Midori Matsuzawa; Keiko Miyajima; Kumi Nakada; Hiromi Ono; Sachiko Otani; Kazue Otokozawa; Ichiko Sato; Shihoko Sato; Kazumi Umezu	South Korea (KOR); Jea Sook-ja; Ji Kyung-hee; Kim Jeong-sun; Kim Kyung-hee; Kwak Sun-ok; Lee Eun-kyung; Lee Myung-hee; Lee Un-yim; Lee Young-sun; Lim Hye-sook; Sun Mi-sook; Yoo Ae-ja
1990 Beijing	China (CHN); He Yunshu; Lai Yawen; Li Guojun; Li Yueming; Mao Wuyang; Qi Lili; Su Huijuan; Su Liqun; Wu Dan; Xu Xin; Zhou Hong	South Korea (KOR); Chang Kyung-hee; Chang Yoon-hee; Eom Jung-mi; Ji Kyung-hee; Ju Sun-jin; Kang Joo-hee; Kim Kui-soon; Kim Kyung-hee; Moon Hyo-sook; Nam Soon-ok; Park Mi-hee; Yoo Yeon-su	Japan (JPN); Kiyoko Fukuda; Shiho Kaneko; Naomi Masuko; Kazuyo Matsukawa; Chie Natori; Motoko Obayashi; Mayumi Saito; Kiyomi Sakamoto; Kumiko Sakamoto; Ichiko Sato; Akiko Suzuki; Tomoko Yoshihara
1994 Hiroshima	South Korea (KOR); Chang So-yun; Chang Yoon-hee; Chung Sun-hye; Hong Ji-yeon; Joo Swn-lan; Jung Eun-sun; Kang Hye-mi; Kim Nam-soon; Lee Do-hee; Lee Jin-young; Oh Yon-kyung; Park Soo-jeong	China (CHN); Cui Yongmei; Ji Liping; Lai Yawen; Li Yan; Mao Julan; Pan Wenli; Qi Lili; Su Huijuan; Su Liqun; Sun Yue; Wang Yi; Wang Ziling	Japan (JPN); Naomi Eto; Kiyoko Fukuda; Kazuyo Matsukawa; Miho Murata; Aki Nagatomi; Chie Natori; Motoko Obayashi; Asako Tajimi; Mika Yamauchi; Eiko Yasui; Tomoko Yoshihara
1998 Bangkok	China (CHN); He Qi; Lai Yawen; Li Yan; Li Yizhi; Qiu Aihua; Sun Yue; Wang Lina; Wang Ziling; Wu Yongmei; Yin Yin; Zhang Jinwen; Zhu Yunying	South Korea (KOR); Chang So-yun; Chang Yoon-hee; Chung Sun-hye; Hong Ji-yeon; Jung Eun-sun; Kang Hye-mi; Kang Mee-sun; Kim Chang-hun; Ku Min-jung; Lee Meong-hee; Park Mee-kyung; Park Soo-jeong	Japan (JPN); Naomi Eto; Eriko Isobe; Chie Kanda; Chikako Kumamae; Hitomi Mitsunaga; Junko Moriyama; Ikumi Ogake; Minako Onuki; Miki Sasaki; Hiromi Suzuki; Asako Tajimi; Hiroko Tsukumo
2002 Busan	China (CHN); Zhang Jing; Feng Kun; Yang Hao; Liu Yanan; Li Shan; Zhou Suhong; Zhao Ruirui; Zhang Yuehong; Chen Jing; Song Nina; Li Ying; Xiong Zi	South Korea (KOR); Kang Hye-mi; Ku Min-jung; Kim Sa-nee; Choi Kwang-hee; Park Mee-kyung; Koo Ki-lan; Chung Sun-hye; Lee Meong-hee; Kim Mi-jin; Chang So-yun; Jung Dae-young; Kim Nam-soon	Japan (JPN); Minako Onuki; Chikako Kumamae; Shinako Tanaka; Kana Oyama; Hisako Mukai; Sachiko Kodama; Miyuki Takahashi; Makiko Horai; Yuko Sano; Sachiko Sugiyama; Ai Otomo; Megumi Kawamura
2006 Doha	China (CHN); Wang Yimei; Feng Kun; Yang Hao; Liu Yanan; Chu Jinling; Li Shan; Zhou Suhong; Li Juan; Song Nina; Zhang Na; Xu Yunli; Zhang Ping	Japan (JPN); Yoshie Takeshita; Miyuki Takahashi; Kaoru Sugayama; Makiko Horai; Sachiko Sugiyama; Midori Takahashi; Erika Araki; Saori Kimura; Shuka Oyama; Mari Ochiai; Akiko Ino; Yuki Ishikawa	Chinese Taipei (TPE); Yeh Hui-hsuan; Lin Chun-yi; Chen Hui-chen; Chen Mei-ching; Kou Nai-han; Chiu Wen-ying; Chen Shu-li; Szu Hui-fang; Lin Ching-i; Tseng Hua-yu; Wu Hsiao-li; Juan Pei-chi
2010 Guangzhou	China (CHN); Wang Yimei; Zhang Lei; Yang Jie; Shen Jingsi; Zhou Suhong; Zhang Xian; Wei Qiuyue; Li Juan; Xu Yunli; Xue Ming; Chen Liyi; Ma Yunwen	South Korea (KOR); Oh Ji-young; Kim Sa-nee; Nam Jie-youn; Yim Myung-ok; Kim Yeon-koung; Han Yoo-mi; Han Song-yi; Jung Dae-young; Hwang Youn-joo; Kim Se-young; Lee So-ra; Yang Hyo-jin	Kazakhstan (KAZ); Natalya Zhukova; Sana Jarlagassova; Olga Nassedkina; Olessya Arslanova; Korinna Ishimtseva; Irina Lukomskaya; Yelena Ezau; Marina Storozhenko; Yuliya Kutsko; Lyudmila Anarbayeva; Inna Matveyeva; Olga Drobyshevskaya
2014 Incheon	South Korea (KOR); Lee Hyo-hee; Kim Hee-jin; Kim Hae-ran; Lee Jae-yeong; Nam Jie-youn; Lee Da-yeong; Kim Yeon-koung; Han Song-yi; Park Jeong-ah; Yang Hyo-jin; Bae Yoo-na; Baek Mok-hwa	China (CHN); Qiao Ting; Yao Di; Yin Na; Wang Qian; Ding Xia; Yan Ni; Zhang Changning; Li Jing; Zhang Xiaoya; Liu Yanhan; Huang Liuyan; Wang Qi	Thailand (THA); Piyanut Pannoy; Em-orn Phanusit; Thatdao Nuekjang; Pleumjit Thinkaow; Onuma Sittirak; Khatthalee Pinsuwan; Wilavan Apinyapong; Tapaphaipun Chaisri; Nootsara Tomkom; Malika Kanthong; Kaewkalaya Kamulthala; Parinya Pankaew
2018 Jakarta–Palembang	China (CHN); Yuan Xinyue; Zhu Ting; Hu Mingyuan; Gong Xiangyu; Zeng Chunlei; Liu Xiaotong; Yao Di; Li Yingying; Diao Linyu; Lin Li; Ding Xia; Yan Ni; Wang Mengjie; Duan Fang	Thailand (THA); Piyanut Pannoy; Pornpun Guedpard; Thatdao Nuekjang; Pleumjit Thinkaow; Onuma Sittirak; Hattaya Bamrungsuk; Wilavan Apinyapong; Nootsara Tomkom; Chitaporn Kamlangmak; Malika Kanthong; Pimpichaya Kokram; Ajcharaporn Kongyot; Chatchu-on Moksri; Supattra Pairoj	South Korea (KOR); Park Eun-jin; Lee Ju-ah; Jung Ho-young; Hwang Min-kyoung; Lee Hyo-hee; Yim Myung-ok; Kim Yeon-koung; Kim Su-ji; Park Jeong-ah; Yang Hyo-jin; Kang So-hwi; Lee Jae-yeong; Lee Da-yeong; Na Hyun-jung
2022 Hangzhou	China (CHN); Yuan Xinyue; Diao Linyu; Gao Yi; Gong Xiangyu; Wang Yuanyuan; Wang Yunlu; Zhong Hui; Li Yingying; Zheng Yixin; Ding Xia; Wang Mengjie; Wu Mengjie	Japan (JPN); Koyomi Iwasaki; Haruyo Shimamura; Yuka Sato; Yuka Meguro; Minami Uesaka; Mizuki Tanaka; Miwako Osanai; Erina Ogawa; Miyu Nakagawa; Tsukasa Nakagawa; Yuki Nishikawa; Shion Hirayama	Thailand (THA); Wipawee Srithong; Piyanut Pannoy; Pornpun Guedpard; Thatdao Nuekjang; Hattaya Bamrungsuk; Pimpichaya Kokram; Sasipaporn Janthawisut; Ajcharaporn Kongyot; Chatchu-on Moksri; Thanacha Sooksod; Sirima Manakij; Jarasporn Bundasak
2026 Aichi–Nagoya	China; Wu Mengjie; Zhuang Yushan; Tang Xin; Zhang Zixuan; Gong Xiangyu; Chen Houyu; Wang Aoqian; Yang Shuming; Dong Yuhan; Xie Shengyu; Guo Zhongnan; Wang Mengjie	Japan; Yukiko Wada; Yoshino Sato; Nanami Seki; Nichika Yamada; Maki Yamaguchi; Hitomi Shiode; Hinata Shigihara; Mana Nishizaki; Ai Hirota; Ayane Kitamado; Miina Inoue; Miku Akimoto	Thailand; Piyanut Pannoy; Pornpun Guedpard; Kanyarat Kunmuang; Thatdao Nuekjang; Warisara Seetaloed; Kalyarat Khamwong; Sasipaporn Janthawisut; Natthanicha Jaisaen; Pimpichaya Kokram; Ajcharaporn Kongyot; Chatchu-on Moksri; Kaewkalaya Kamulthala

== Nine-a-side volleyball ==
=== Men ===
Games	Gold	Silver	Bronze
1958 Tokyo	Japan (JPN); Ryoji Ishizone; Nobuo Kasahara; Mitsuhiro Kobayashi; Yasutaka Matsudaira; Yoshiaki Matsunaga; Takamitsu Mizuno; Ikko Nishida; Kiyoshi Nishihara; Masahiro Shigeta; Masami Tachiki; Yosuke Tajima; Rikio Takahashi; Katsuhito Toyofuku; Masaru Tsukamoto; Mitsugu Yasuda	South Korea (KOR); Jang Kyung-hwan; Kim Young-kwan; Kwak Dong-pal; Oh Jae-wol; Oh Man-heung; Park Ji-kook; Park Jin-kwan; Seo Jong-cheon; Seo Yun-chol; Son Young-wan; Yu Jeong-woong; Yun Heon-sik	Republic of China (ROC); Chen Ching-sung; Chen Wen-yung; Hsieh Tien-hsing; Huang Chao-lu; Kung Chi-lin; Kuo Chun-lu; Lee Cheng-wei; Lee Yu-i; Lee Yu-pang; Liu Wen-chan; Ni Wo-tang; Pei Jui-yuan; Tseng Fu-chang; Wang Tso-keng; Yeh Chung
1962 Jakarta	Japan (JPN); Yutaka Demachi; Masashi Fukagawa; Hirokuni Hara; Tadayoshi Ichikawa; Matsuo Kawasaki; Tsutomu Koyama; Masayuki Minami; Teruhisa Moriyama; Yasutaka Sato; Sadatoshi Sugawara; Nobuhisa Takada; Masahiro Yamaguchi	South Korea (KOR); Choi Sang-keun; Han Jae-sup; Kim Kwang-ho; Kim Young-kwan; Lee Yun-paek; Lim Tae-ho; Park Ji-kook; Park Jin-uh; Park Sang-wong; Park Su-kwang; Seo Yun-chol; Son Young-wan	Philippines (PHI); Julius Baldesimo; Teofilo Benito; Guillermo Blanco; Domingo Cuenca; Agapito Custodio; Rodolfo Gonzales; Ruben Labay; Isaac Limosnero; Florencio Longakit; Rodolfo Manuel; Ildefonso Mariquit; Alfredo Mercado; Francisco Orante

=== Women ===
Games	Gold	Silver	Bronze
1962 Jakarta	Japan (JPN); Miyoko Kodama; Masako Kondo; Eiko Maeda; Kazuko Okunaga; Terumi Sasamoto; Ayano Shibuki; Yukiko Tanaka; Shigeko Yamaguchi; Setsuko Yoshida; Yu Yoshinaka	South Korea (KOR); Choi Myung-ja; Jo Dong-ryong; Joo Bang-ja; Kim Ke-hwan; Kim Koon-ja; Kim Yung-bong; Lee Choon-il; Lee Jae-soon; Lee Yung-ja; Ryoo Choon-ja; Suh Choon-kang; Yoo Myung-ja	Indonesia (INA); Evy Sofia Achid; Jane Gunawan; Meity Joseph; Paulina Lessil; Helena Marwati; Joan Paulini; Rasni Rasmo; Hetty Rosadi; Lenny Sahertian; Augustien Siahaija; Hartaty Soekardjo; Amy Surjotjokro; Tan Lan Ing; Andi Tja Tjambolang; Tjia Boet Nio
