= Volleyball at the 1994 Asian Games =

- Venue: Green Arena
- Dates: 3–16 October 1994
- Nations: 9

Volleyball events were contested at the 1994 Asian Games in Hiroshima, Japan from 3 October to 16 October 1994 at the Green Arena.

== Schedule ==
●	Round	●	Last round	P	Preliminary round	S	Second round	½	Semifinals	F	Finals

Event↓/Date →	3rd Mon	4th Tue	5th Wed	6th Thu	7th Fri	8th Sat	9th Sun	10th Mon	11th Tue	12th Wed	13th Thu	14th Fri	15th Sat	16th Sun
Men	P	P		P	P		P	P	S	S	S		½	F
Women	●	●	●	●	●									

== Medalists ==
Event	Gold	Silver	Bronze
Men	Japan; Shigeru Aoyama; Masayuki Izumikawa; Hideaki Kobayashi; Akihiko Matsuda; Katsuyuki Minami; Norihiko Miyazaki; Yuichi Nakagaichi; Takashi Narita; Hideyuki Otake; Masafumi Oura; Taichi Sasaki; Kenji Yamamoto	China; Chen Feng; Hou Jing; Li Haiyun; Lu Weizhong; Weng Yiqing; Xie Guochen; Yan Feng; Zhang Di; Zhang Liming; Zhang Xiang; Zheng Liang; Zhou Jianan	South Korea; Ha Jong-hwa; Im Do-hun; Jae Hee-kyung; Kim Byung-sun; Kim Chul-soo; Kim Sang-woo; Kim Se-jin; Lee Sung-hee; Park Hee-sang; Park Jong-chan; Park Sam-ryong; Shin Young-chul
Women	South Korea; Chang So-yun; Chang Yoon-hee; Chung Sun-hye; Hong Ji-yeon; Joo Swn-lan; Jung Eun-sun; Kang Hye-mi; Kim Nam-soon; Lee Do-hee; Lee Jin-young; Oh Yon-kyung; Park Soo-jeong	China; Cui Yongmei; Ji Liping; Lai Yawen; Li Yan; Mao Julan; Pan Wenli; Qi Lili; Su Huijuan; Su Liqun; Sun Yue; Wang Yi; Wang Ziling	Japan; Naomi Eto; Kiyoko Fukuda; Kazuyo Matsukawa; Miho Murata; Aki Nagatomi; Chie Natori; Motoko Obayashi; Asako Tajimi; Mika Yamauchi; Eiko Yasui; Tomoko Yoshihara

== Medal table ==
Rank	Nation	Gold	Silver	Bronze	Total
1	Japan (JPN)	1	0	1	2
1	South Korea (KOR)	1	0	1	2
3	China (CHN)	0	2	0	2
Totals (3 entries)		2	2	2	6

== Final standing ==
=== Men ===
Rank	Team	Pld	W	L
1st place, gold medalist(s)	Japan	5	4	1
2nd place, silver medalist(s)	China	5	4	1
3rd place, bronze medalist(s)	South Korea	4	3	1
4	Kazakhstan	10	7	3
5	Iran	9	5	4
6	Pakistan	10	3	7
7	Mongolia	9	0	9

=== Women ===
Rank	Team	Pld	W	L
1st place, gold medalist(s)	South Korea	5	5	0
2nd place, silver medalist(s)	China	5	4	1
3rd place, bronze medalist(s)	Japan	5	3	2
4	Chinese Taipei	5	2	3
5	Thailand	5	1	4
6	Mongolia	5	0	5
