= Volleyball at the 1990 Asian Games =

- Venue: Chaoyang Gymnasium
- Dates: 23 September – 5 October 1990
- Nations: 11

Volleyball events were contested at the 1990 Asian Games in Chaoyang Gymnasium, Beijing, China from 23 September 1990 to 5 October 1990.

== Medalists ==
Event	Gold	Silver	Bronze
Men	China; Cao Maowen; Jiang Jie; Ju Genyin; Li Haiyun; Su Xuehui; Weng Yiqing; Wu Wei; Xu Guorong; Yan Feng; Zhang Jianwei; Zhang Renjiang; Zhou Jianan	South Korea; Chang Yoon-chang; Chung Euy-tak; Ha Jong-hwa; Han Jang-sok; Hong Hae-cheon; Lee Kyung-suk; Lee Sang-yeol; Ma Nak-gil; No Jin-su; Park Sam-ryong; Shin Young-chul; Yoon Jong-il	Japan; Shigeru Aoyama; Masayoshi Manabe; Katsuyuki Minami; Yuichi Nakagaichi; Takashi Narita; Masaji Ogino; Hideyuki Otake; Masafumi Oura; Satoshi Sensui; Yuji Takeda; Tatsuya Ueta
Women	China; He Yunshu; Lai Yawen; Li Guojun; Li Yueming; Mao Wuyang; Qi Lili; Su Huijuan; Su Liqun; Wu Dan; Xu Xin; Zhou Hong	South Korea; Chang Kyung-hee; Chang Yoon-hee; Eom Jung-mi; Ji Kyung-hee; Ju Sun-jin; Kang Joo-hee; Kim Kui-soon; Kim Kyung-hee; Moon Hyo-sook; Nam Soon-ok; Park Mi-hee; Ryou Yeon-soo	Japan; Kiyoko Fukuda; Shiho Kaneko; Naomi Masuko; Kazuyo Matsukawa; Chie Natori; Motoko Obayashi; Mayumi Saito; Kiyomi Sakamoto; Kumiko Sakamoto; Ichiko Sato; Akiko Suzuki; Tomoko Yoshihara

== Medal table ==
Rank	Nation	Gold	Silver	Bronze	Total
1	China (CHN)	2	0	0	2
2	South Korea (KOR)	0	2	0	2
3	Japan (JPN)	0	0	2	2
Totals (3 entries)		2	2	2	6

== Final standing ==
=== Men ===
Rank	Team	Pld	W	L
1st place, gold medalist(s)	China	6	6	0
2nd place, silver medalist(s)	South Korea	5	4	1
3rd place, bronze medalist(s)	Japan	5	3	2
4	North Korea	6	3	3
5	Pakistan	6	4	2
6	Saudi Arabia	6	2	4
7	Vietnam	5	2	3
8	Hong Kong	5	0	5
9	Myanmar	4	0	4

=== Women ===
Rank	Team	Pld	W	L
1st place, gold medalist(s)	China	5	5	0
2nd place, silver medalist(s)	South Korea	5	4	1
3rd place, bronze medalist(s)	Japan	5	3	2
4	North Korea	5	2	3
5	Chinese Taipei	5	1	4
6	Thailand	5	0	5
