= Volleyball at the 1962 Asian Games =

- Venue: Senayan Volleyball Stadium
- Dates: 25 August – 2 September 1962
- Nations: 11

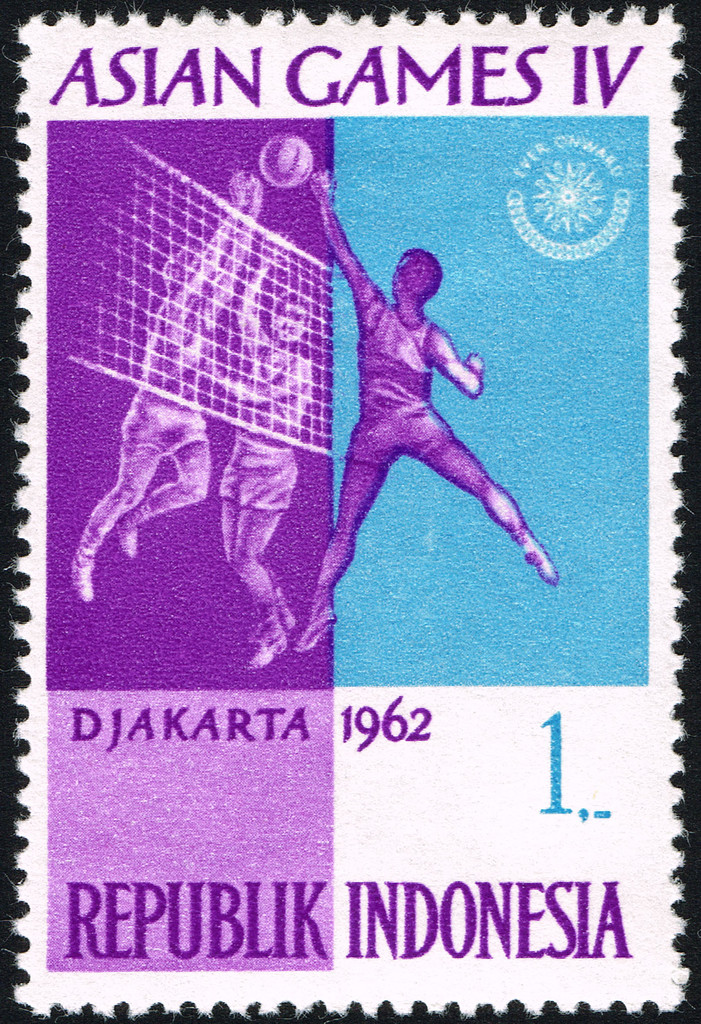
Volleyball at the 1962 Asian Games on a stamp of Indonesia

Volleyball events were contested at the 1962 Asian Games in Jakarta, Indonesia.

== Medalists ==
=== Volleyball ===
Event	Gold	Silver	Bronze
Men	Japan; Yutaka Demachi; Masashi Fukagawa; Hirokuni Hara; Tadayoshi Ichikawa; Matsuo Kawasaki; Tsutomu Koyama; Masayuki Minami; Teruhisa Moriyama; Yasutaka Sato; Sadatoshi Sugawara; Nobuhisa Takada; Masahiro Yamaguchi	India; Nripjit Singh Bedi; Tilakam Gopal; Joseph; Jai Karan; Khalid; Munnalal; T. P. Padmanabhan Nair; A. Palanisamy; Des Raj; Jaswant Singh	Pakistan; Mirza Aziz Ahmed Baig; Faiz Ahmed Bodla; Nazar Farid; Sikandar Hayat; Abdul Khaliq Khan; Riaz Maluk; Nasim Mirza; Noor Muhammad; Rab Nawaz; Muhammad Rafiq; Ghulam Rasool; Muhammad Sharif
Women	Japan; Miyoko Kodama; Masako Kondo; Eiko Maeda; Kazuko Okunaga; Terumi Sasamoto; Ayano Shibuki; Yukiko Tanaka; Shigeko Yamaguchi; Setsuko Yoshida; Yu Yoshinaka	South Korea; Choi Myung-ja; Jo Dong-ryong; Joo Bang-ja; Kim Ke-hwan; Kim Koon-ja; Kim Yung-bong; Lee Choon-il; Lee Jae-soon; Lee Yung-ja; Ryoo Choon-ja; Suh Choon-kang; Yoo Myung-ja	Indonesia; Evy Sofia Achid; Jane Gunawan; Paulina Lessil; Helena Marwati; Joan Paulini; Rasni Rasmo; Lenny Sahertian; Augustien Siahaija; Hartaty Soekardjo; Amy Surjotjokro; Tan Lan Ing; Tjia Boet Nio

=== Nine-a-side volleyball ===
Event	Gold	Silver	Bronze
Men	Japan; Yutaka Demachi; Masashi Fukagawa; Hirokuni Hara; Tadayoshi Ichikawa; Matsuo Kawasaki; Tsutomu Koyama; Masayuki Minami; Teruhisa Moriyama; Yasutaka Sato; Sadatoshi Sugawara; Nobuhisa Takada; Masahiro Yamaguchi	South Korea; Choi Sang-keun; Han Jae-sup; Kim Kwang-ho; Kim Young-kwan; Lee Yun-paek; Lim Tae-ho; Park Ji-kook; Park Jin-uh; Park Sang-wong; Park Su-kwang; Seo Yun-chol; Son Young-wan	Philippines; Julius Baldesimo; Teofilo Benito; Guillermo Blanco; Domingo Cuenca; Agapito Custodio; Rodolfo Gonzales; Ruben Labay; Isaac Limosnero; Florencio Longakit; Rodolfo Manuel; Ildefonso Mariquit; Alfredo Mercado; Francisco Orante
Women	Japan; Miyoko Kodama; Masako Kondo; Eiko Maeda; Kazuko Okunaga; Terumi Sasamoto; Ayano Shibuki; Yukiko Tanaka; Shigeko Yamaguchi; Setsuko Yoshida; Yu Yoshinaka	South Korea; Choi Myung-ja; Jo Dong-ryong; Joo Bang-ja; Kim Ke-hwan; Kim Koon-ja; Kim Yung-bong; Lee Choon-il; Lee Jae-soon; Lee Yung-ja; Ryoo Choon-ja; Suh Choon-kang; Yoo Myung-ja	Indonesia; Evy Sofia Achid; Jane Gunawan; Meity Joseph; Paulina Lessil; Helena Marwati; Joan Paulini; Rasni Rasmo; Hetty Rosadi; Lenny Sahertian; Augustien Siahaija; Hartaty Soekardjo; Amy Surjotjokro; Tan Lan Ing; Andi Tja Tjambolang; Tjia Boet Nio

== Medal table ==
Rank	Nation	Gold	Silver	Bronze	Total
1	Japan (JPN)	4	0	0	4
2	South Korea (KOR)	0	3	0	3
3	India (IND)	0	1	0	1
4	Indonesia (INA)	0	0	2	2
5	Pakistan (PAK)	0	0	1	1
5	Philippines (PHI)	0	0	1	1
Totals (6 entries)		4	4	4	12

== Draw ==
The draw for volleyball competition was held on 23 August 1962. Three pools were drawn for the international system (six players) in the men's competition, the other competitions were played in round robin format.

Pool A

- Indonesia
- South Korea
- Thailand

Pool B

- India
- Burma
- Cambodia
- ~~Republic of China~~

Pool C

- Japan
- Pakistan
- Philippines

* Republic of China withdrew from both international and far eastern competitions because Indonesian government refused to issue visas for the Taiwanese delegation.

== Final standing ==
=== Volleyball ===
==== Men ====
Rank	Team	Pld	W	L
1st place, gold medalist(s)	Japan	7	7	0
2nd place, silver medalist(s)	India	7	6	1
3rd place, bronze medalist(s)	Pakistan	7	3	4
4	Indonesia	7	4	3
5	South Korea	7	3	4
6	Burma	7	1	6
7	Cambodia	4	2	2
8	Thailand	4	1	3
9	Philippines	4	0	4

==== Women ====
Rank	Team	Pld	W	L
1st place, gold medalist(s)	Japan	3	3	0
2nd place, silver medalist(s)	South Korea	3	2	1
3rd place, bronze medalist(s)	Indonesia	3	1	2
4	Philippines	3	0	3

=== Nine-a-side volleyball ===
==== Men ====
Rank	Team	Pld	W	L
1st place, gold medalist(s)	Japan	5	5	0
2nd place, silver medalist(s)	South Korea	5	4	1
3rd place, bronze medalist(s)	Philippines	5	3	2
4	Indonesia	5	2	3
5	Singapore	5	1	4
6	Malaya	5	0	5

==== Women ====
Rank	Team	Pld	W	L
1st place, gold medalist(s)	Japan	3	3	0
2nd place, silver medalist(s)	South Korea	3	2	1
3rd place, bronze medalist(s)	Indonesia	3	1	2
4	Philippines	3	0	3
