= Volleyball at the 2002 Asian Games – Men's tournament =

Men at the 2002 Asian Games
- Venue: Gijang Gymnasium
- Date: 2–13 October 2002
- Competitors: 106 from 9 nations

Medalists
gold medal	South Korea
silver medal	Iran
bronze medal	Japan

The men's volleyball tournament at the 2002 Asian Games was held from Tuesday October 2 to Saturday October 13, 2002 in Busan, South Korea. The men's volleyball event was contested for the 12th time at the Asian Games.

China and Japan's best players had to miss the event due to the schedule conflicting with the 2002 FIVB Volleyball Men's World Championship in Argentina, but South Korea withdrew from the world championship to participate in Asian Games.

== Squads ==
China	Chinese Taipei	India	Iran
Liu Guangxin; Wang Ye; Ma Ming; Hu Song; An Jiajie; Guo Liang; Wang Jin; Yuan Zhi; Xie Guochen; Zhang Xiang; Wang Jianli; Liu Wei	Liu Yu-yi; Cheng Hsiao-tsun; Sung Kuo-wei; Chang En-chung; Lin Chih-hua; Chou Tsung-hao; Teng Cheng-wei; Huang Hsien-chang; Wu Chung-cheng; Ke Li-ren; Lin Hsien-chen; Wu Chih-min	M. S. Rajesh; Tom Joseph; Abhijeet Bhattacharya; Joby Joseph; Ravikanth Reddy; Avnish Kumar Yadav; P. V. Sunil Kumar; Yejju Subba Rao; Raghuveer Singh; Arun Jakhmola; Amir Singh; K. J. Kapil Dev	Amir Hossein Monazzami; Amir Hosseini; Abbas Ghasemian; Peyman Akbari; Mohammad Mansouri; Ahsanollah Shirkavand; Mahmoud Afshardoust; Behnam Mahmoudi; Mohammad Torkashvand; Afshin Oliaei; Alireza Behboudi; Rahman Mohammadirad
Japan	Macau	Qatar	Pakistan
Kenji Yamamoto; Mitsuaki Utena; Yuichiro Sawahata; Masayuki Izumikawa; Yukito Tokumoto; Naoki Morokuma; Masahiro Miyashita; Takamasa Suzuki; Daisuke Usami; Takehiro Kihara; Kota Yamamura; Yu Koshikawa	Lei Un Pio; Lam Weng Kin; Too Wai Kei; Too Chuen Ki; Ngai Kam Hung; Leong Ka Ho; Choi Wai Kit; Leong Ka Wa; Ho Chin Pang; Lai Sai Tik; Madhukar Thapa; Cheong Ka Chon	Osman Ajab; Khalid Al-Kaabi; Saeed Al-Jamaani; Mubarak Eid Al-Abdulla; Mohammed Al-Nasser; Ali Ishaq Bairami; Jamal Sayar; Ali Rashid; Jabir Al-Athba; Mubarak Rashid Al-Abdulla; Saeed Aman Al-Hitmi; Saeed Juma Al-Hitmi	Muhammad Jamil; Ashfaq Hussain; Muhammad Tufail; Zafar Iqbal; Sajid Nawaz; Irfan Nawaz; Bakht Risal; Muhammad Elahi; Kashif Mansoor; Ihsanullah Khan
South Korea			
Shin Jin-sik; Kim Se-jin; Park Jae-han; Yeo Oh-hyun; Choi Tae-woong; Kim Sang-woo; Bang Sin-bong; Shin Sun-ho; Lee Kyung-soo; Suk Jin-wook; Kwon Young-min; Chang Byung-chul			

== Results ==
All times are Korea Standard Time (UTC+09:00)

=== Preliminary round ===
==== Pool A ====
Pos	Team	Pld	W	L	Pts	SW	SL	SR	SPW	SPL	SPR	Qualification
1	South Korea	4	4	0	8	12	0	MAX	302	198	1.525	Semifinals
2	Iran	4	3	1	7	9	5	1.800	327	301	1.086	Semifinals
3	India	4	2	2	6	8	6	1.333	336	308	1.091	Classification 5th–8th
4	Qatar	4	1	3	5	3	10	0.300	251	305	0.823	Classification 5th–8th
5	Macau	4	0	4	4	1	12	0.083	214	318	0.673	

Source: Results

Date	Time		Score		Set 1	Set 2	Set 3	Set 4	Set 5	Total
02 Oct	10:00	Iran	3–0	Macau	25–15	25–15	25–15			75–45
02 Oct	16:00	South Korea	3–0	India	25–22	25–17	27–25			77–64
03 Oct	16:00	India	2–3	Iran	20–25	23–25	39–37	28–26	12–15	122–128
04 Oct	12:00	Macau	0–3	India	13–25	16–25	21–25			50–75
04 Oct	16:00	Qatar	0–3	South Korea	14–25	19–25	13–25			46–75
05 Oct	16:00	Iran	3–0	Qatar	25–22	25–15	25–22			75–59
07 Oct	14:00	Qatar	3–1	Macau	25–16	18–25	25–22	25–17		93–80
07 Oct	16:00	South Korea	3–0	Iran	25–17	25–20	25–12			75–49
08 Oct	10:00	India	3–0	Qatar	25–22	25–17	25–14			75–53
08 Oct	16:00	Macau	0–3	South Korea	15–25	13–25	11–25			39–75

==== Pool B ====
Pos	Team	Pld	W	L	Pts	SW	SL	SR	SPW	SPL	SPR	Qualification
1	China	3	3	0	6	9	3	3.000	291	257	1.132	Semifinals
2	Japan	3	2	1	5	7	5	1.400	263	242	1.087	Semifinals
3	Chinese Taipei	3	1	2	4	6	6	1.000	273	271	1.007	Classification 5th–8th
4	Pakistan	3	0	3	3	1	9	0.111	188	245	0.767	Classification 5th–8th

Source: Results

Date	Time		Score		Set 1	Set 2	Set 3	Set 4	Set 5	Total
03 Oct	12:00	Japan	1–3	China	25–21	20–25	16–25	22–25		83–96
03 Oct	14:00	Pakistan	0–3	Chinese Taipei	18–25	19–25	26–28			63–78
05 Oct	12:00	China	3–1	Chinese Taipei	29–27	25–23	24–26	25–20		103–96
05 Oct	14:00	Japan	3–0	Pakistan	25–16	25–18	25–13			75–47
06 Oct	10:00	Pakistan	1–3	China	16–25	16–25	25–17	21–25		78–92
06 Oct	12:00	Chinese Taipei	2–3	Japan	21–25	18–25	25–21	25–19	10–15	99–105

=== Rank round ===
5th–8th place
10 October
Chinese Taipei	3
Qatar	0
10 October
India	3
Pakistan	0

5th–6th place
12 October
Chinese Taipei	1
India	3
7th–8th place
12 October
Qatar	0
Pakistan	3

==== Semifinals ====
Date	Time		Score		Set 1	Set 2	Set 3	Set 4	Set 5	Total
10 Oct	12:00	India	3–0	Pakistan	25–15	25–17	25–15			75–47
10 Oct	14:00	Chinese Taipei	3–0	Qatar	25–14	25–22	25–19			75–55

==== 7th–8th place ====
Date	Time		Score		Set 1	Set 2	Set 3	Set 4	Set 5	Total
12 Oct	12:00	Qatar	0–3	Pakistan	17–25	21–25	22–25			60–75

==== 5th–6th place ====
Date	Time		Score		Set 1	Set 2	Set 3	Set 4	Set 5	Total
12 Oct	14:00	Chinese Taipei	1–3	India	23–25	21–25	25–18	32–34		101–102

=== Final round ===
Semifinals
11 October
South Korea	3
Japan	0
11 October
China	2
Iran	3

Final
13 October
South Korea	3
Iran	0
3rd–4th place
13 October
Japan	3
China	2

==== Semifinals ====
Date	Time		Score		Set 1	Set 2	Set 3	Set 4	Set 5	Total
11 Oct	14:00	China	2–3	Iran	16–25	25–19	21–25	25–22	11–15	98–106
11 Oct	16:00	South Korea	3–0	Japan	27–25	25–21	27–25			79–71

==== 3rd–4th place ====
Date	Time		Score		Set 1	Set 2	Set 3	Set 4	Set 5	Total
13 Oct	14:00	Japan	3–2	China	22–25	22–25	25–22	25–16	15–9	109–97

==== Final ====
Date	Time		Score		Set 1	Set 2	Set 3	Set 4	Set 5	Total
13 Oct	16:00	South Korea	3–0	Iran	25–18	25–19	25–23			75–60

== Final standing ==
Rank	Team	Pld	W	L
1st place, gold medalist(s)	South Korea	6	6	0
2nd place, silver medalist(s)	Iran	6	4	2
3rd place, bronze medalist(s)	Japan	5	3	2
4	China	5	3	2
5	India	6	4	2
6	Chinese Taipei	5	2	3
7	Pakistan	5	1	4
8	Qatar	6	1	5
9	Macau	4	0	4
