= Man-su =

- Hangul: 만수
- RR: Mansu
- MR: Mansu
- IPA: [mɐn.su]

Man-su, also spelled Man-soo, is a Korean given name.

People with this name include:

- Kang Man-soo (born 1955), South Korean volleyball player
- Lee Man-soo (born 1958), South Korean baseball coach and former catcher
- Kim Man-su (baseball) (born 1996), South Korean baseball catcher
- Kim Man-su (politician), North Korean politician elected in the 2014 North Korean parliamentary election

Fictional characters with this name include:

- Mansu, one of the title characters of 1988 South Korean film Chilsu and Mansu
- Man-soo, character in 2007 South Korean television series Likeable or Not
- Oh Man-soo, character in 2017 South Korean television series Black

== See also ==
- List of Korean given names
