= Volleyball at the 1958 Asian Games =

- Venue: Komazawa Outdoor Volleyball Court
- Dates: 25–31 May 1958
- Nations: 7

Volleyball was contested for men only at the 1958 Asian Games in Komazawa Outdoor Volleyball Court, Tokyo, Japan.

== Medalists ==
=== Volleyball ===
Event	Gold	Silver	Bronze
Men	Japan; Yutaka Demachi; Masashi Fukagawa; Toshio Kawamura; Tadanao Koizumi; Tsutomu Koyama; Motoo Maruya; Shoichi Mukai; Kaoru Noguchi; Tomoyoshi Sakahashi; Nobuhide Sato; Yoshikazu Tsuda; Masahiro Yoshida	Iran; Mahmoud Adl; Mohammad Sharifzadeh; Abbas Tehrani; Abdolmonem Kamal; Siavash Farrokhi; Hossein Ali Amiri; Kamal Pourhashemi; Mohammad Esmaeil Ashtari	India; T. R. Arunchalam; S. L. Gupta; P. Bharathan Nair; T. P. Padmanabhan Nair; Abdur Rahman; Raman; S. K. Sheikuchan; Gurdev Singh

=== Nine-a-side volleyball ===
Event	Gold	Silver	Bronze
Men	Japan; Ryoji Ishizone; Nobuo Kasahara; Mitsuhiro Kobayashi; Yasutaka Matsudaira; Yoshiaki Matsunaga; Takamitsu Mizuno; Ikko Nishida; Kiyoshi Nishihara; Masahiro Shigeta; Masami Tachiki; Yosuke Tajima; Rikio Takahashi; Katsuhito Toyofuku; Masaru Tsukamoto; Mitsugu Yasuda	South Korea; Jang Kyung-hwan; Kim Young-kwan; Kwak Dong-pal; Oh Jae-wol; Oh Man-heung; Park Ji-kook; Park Jin-kwan; Seo Jong-cheon; Seo Yun-chol; Son Young-wan; Yu Jeong-woong; Yun Heon-sik	Republic of China; Chen Ching-sung; Chen Wen-yung; Hsieh Tien-hsing; Huang Chao-lu; Kung Chi-lin; Kuo Chun-lu; Lee Cheng-wei; Lee Yu-i; Lee Yu-pang; Liu Wen-chan; Ni Wo-tang; Pei Jui-yuan; Tseng Fu-chang; Wang Tso-keng; Yeh Chung

== Medal table ==
Rank	Nation	Gold	Silver	Bronze	Total
1	Japan (JPN)	2	0	0	2
2	Iran (IRN)	0	1	0	1
2	South Korea (KOR)	0	1	0	1
4	India (IND)	0	0	1	1
4	Republic of China (ROC)	0	0	1	1
Totals (5 entries)		2	2	2	6

== Final standing ==
=== Volleyball ===
Rank	Team	Pld	W	L
1st place, gold medalist(s)	Japan	4	4	0
2nd place, silver medalist(s)	Iran	4	3	1
3rd place, bronze medalist(s)	India	4	2	2
4	Philippines	4	1	3
5	Hong Kong	4	0	4

=== Nine-a-side volleyball ===
Rank	Team	Pld	W	L
1st place, gold medalist(s)	Japan	4	4	0
2nd place, silver medalist(s)	South Korea	4	3	1
3rd place, bronze medalist(s)	Republic of China	4	2	2
4	Hong Kong	4	1	3
5	Philippines	4	0	4
