= Lee Jae-yeong =

South Korean volleyball player (born 1996)

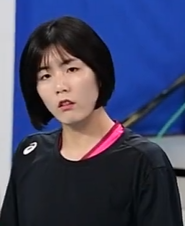

Personal information
- Nationality: South Korean
- Born: 15 October 1996 (age 30); Iksan, North Jeolla Province, South Korea
- Height: 1.78 m (5 ft 10 in)
- Weight: 63 kg (139 lb)
- Spike: 286 cm (113 in)
- Block: 274 cm (108 in)

Volleyball information
- Position: Outside spiker

Career
Years	Teams
2014–2021	(South Korea) Incheon Heungkuk Life
2021–2022	(Greece) PAOK Thessaloniki
2025–2026	(Japan) Victorina Himeji

National team
2013–2021	South Korea

Korean name
- Hangul: 이재영
- RR: I Jaeyeong
- MR: I Chaeyŏng

Lee Jae-yeong
Medal record

Women's volleyball

Representing South Korea

Asian Games
Gold medal – first place	2014 Incheon	team
Bronze medal – third place	2018 Jakarta-Palembang	team

Asian Championship
Silver medal – second place	2015 Tianjin	
Bronze medal – third place	2013 Nakhon Ratchasima	
Bronze medal – third place	2019 Seoul	

Asian Cup Championship
Silver medal – second place	2014 Shenzhen	

Asian Women's U19 Volleyball Championship
Bronze medal – third place	2014 Taipei	

Lee Jae-yeong (Korean: 이재영; born 15 October 1996) is a South Korean volleyball player. She played as the Outside Hitter for the South Korea women's national volleyball team. She is the twin sister of Lee Da-yeong, who was also a member of the South Korea national volleyball team.

== Career ==
2014 FIVB World Grand Prix placing in eighth place. With the club 2014–2015 Incheon Heungkuk Life Pink Spiders, Lee ended up in fourth place in the Korean V-League.

Lee played the 2015 FIVB Women's World Cup Volleyball ranking in the sixth place,

She played with her National team the 2016 World Olympics Qualification Tournament ranking in fourth place and qualifying for the 2016 Summer Olympics, were her team ended up in fifth place. She ranked in sixth place at the 2017 FIVB Volleyball Women's World Grand Champions Cup and played the 2018 FIVB Volleyball Women's World Championship qualification.

== Personal life ==
Lee Jae-yeong was born on 15 October 1996 as one of twin daughters to Kim Gyeong-hui and Lee Ju-hyeong. Her mother is Kim Gyeong-hui who played as a setter for the South Korea women's national volleyball team at the 1988 Summer Olympics.

Lee studied in the Jeonju Jungsan Elementary School, the Jinju Gyeonghae Girls' Middle School and the Jinju Sunmyung Girls' High School. Her twin sister Lee Da-yeong is also a national volleyball player.

In February 2021, several people who went to the same school club as the two sisters posted it online, that the twins had committed school violence. It is said that they also assault and threaten people with weapons, confinement, verbal abuse, and swearing at their parents.

The sisters were both suspended indefinitely by their club after being anonymously accused of bullying online.

The Korean Volleyball Association also issued a disciplinary punishment that they have been banned from participating in the national team indefinitely as well as permanent expulsion so that they cannot be listed on the list as a volleyball coaches even after retirement.

They have however claimed that many of the bullying accusations made towards them were false, and plan on taking legal action against the anonymous author of the online post.

== Club career ==
- (South Korea) Incheon Heungkuk Life Pink Spiders (2014–2021)
- (Greece) PAOK Thessaloniki (2021–2022)
- (Japan) Victorina Himeji (2025-present)

=== Team ===
- Korean V-League
  - Champion (1): 2018–19
  - Runners-up (1): 2016–17

=== Individuals ===
- Korean V-League Final "MVP" (1): 2018–19
- Korean V-League "MVP" (2): 2016–17, 2018–19
- Korean V-League "Best 7" (5): 2015–16, 2016–17, 2017–18, 2018–19, 2019–20
- Korean V-League "MVP of the Round" (5): 2014–15 6R, 2015–16 1R, 2016–17 2R, 2018–19 3R,6R
- Korean V-League "Rookie of the Year" (1): 2014–15
- Korean V-League "All-Star MVP" (1): 2018–19
- Dong-A Sports Awards -"Women's Volleyball Player of the Year" (1): 2019

== International career ==
=== National team ===
- Summer Olympics
  - 2016 – 5th
- FIVB World Championship
  - 2018 – 17th
- FIVB World Cup
  - 2015 – 6th
  - 2019 – 6th
- FIVB Volleyball Nations League
  - 2018 – 12th
- FIVB World Grand Prix
  - 2014 – 8th
- FIVB World Grand Champions Cup
  - 2017 – 6th
- Asian Games
  - 2014 – 1st
  - 2018 – 3rd
- Asian Championship
  - 2013 – 3rd
  - 2015 – 2nd
  - 2019 – 3rd
- AVC Cup
  - 2014 – 2nd
- Asian Junior Championship
  - 2012 – 5th
  - 2014 – 3rd

=== Individuals ===
- 2014 Asian Junior Championship "Best outside spiker"
