= Kim Nam-soon =

Kim Nam-soon may refer to:

- Kim Nam-soon (archer)
- Kim Nam-soon (volleyball)
