= Lee In =

Lee In may refer to:

- Yi In, Prince Euneon (1754–1801), member of the royal family of the Joseon dynasty
- Lee In (politician) (1896–1979), first Minister of Justice of South Korea
- Lee In (volleyball) (born 1952), South Korean volleyball player
- Lee In (actor) (born 1984), South Korean actor
