= Kim Man-su =

Kim Man-su may refer to:

- Kim Man-su (baseball)
- Kim Man-su (politician)
