= Kim Jin-hui =

Kim Jin-hui may refer to:

- Kim Jin-hee (volleyball)
- Kim Jin-hui (footballer)
