= Lee Jong-kyung =

Lee Jong-kyung (Korean: 이종경; RR: I Jonggyeong) may refer to:

- Lee Jong-kyung (volleyball) (born 1962), South Korean volleyball player
- Lee Jong-kyung (sledge hockey) (born 1973), South Korean sledge hockey player
