= Lee Da-yeong =

South Korean volleyball player

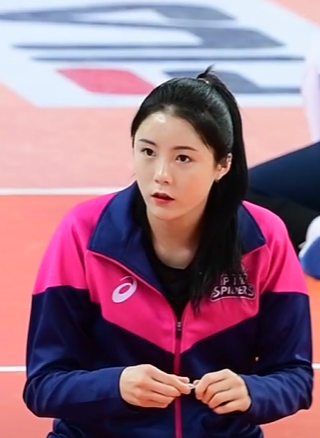
- Lee in 2020

Personal information
- Nationality: South Korea
- Born: 15 October 1996 (age 30) Iksan, North Jeolla Province, South Korea
- Height: 1.79 m (5 ft 10 in)
- Weight: 62 kg (137 lb)
- Spike: 282 cm (111 in)
- Block: 263 cm (104 in)

Volleyball information
- Position: Setter
- Current club: San Diego Mojo
- Number: 19

Career
- Years: Team
- 2014–2020: (South Korea) Suwon Hyundai Engineering & Construction Hillstate
- 2020–2021: (South Korea) Incheon Heungkuk Life Pink Spiders
- 2021–2022: (Greece) PAOK Thessaloniki
- 2022–2023: (Romania) CS Rapid București
- 2023–2024: (France) Volero Le Cannet
- 2024: (Greece) Panionios
- 2025–: (United States) San Diego Mojo

National team
- Years: Team
- 2012–2021: South Korea
Honours
Representing South Korea
Asian Games
Gold medal – first place	2014 Incheon	team
Bronze medal – third place	2018 Jakarta-Palembang	team
Asian Women's Volleyball Championship
Bronze medal – third place	2013 Nakhon Ratchasima	team
Asian Cup Championship
Silver medal – second place	2014 Shenzhen	team
Asian Women's U19 Volleyball Championship
Bronze medal – third place	2014 Taipei	team
- Updated on 10 August 2018

Korean name
- Hangul: 이다영
- Hanja: 李多英
- RR: I Dayeong
- MR: I Tayŏng

Lee Da-yeong (Korean: 이다영; born 15 October 1996) is a South Korean volleyball player who previously played as a setter for the South Korea women's national volleyball team. She is the twin sister of Lee Jae-yeong, who was also a member of the South Korea national Volleyball team.

== Career ==
Lee Da-yeong started her international career similarly to her twin sister and they have played together in several international events for the national team, including the 2014 Asian Games held in South Korea, at which they clinched the gold medal. Other tournaments at which they have competed in together include the 2018 FIVB Volleyball Women's Nations League, the 2018 Asian Games, and the 2019 FIVB Volleyball Women's World Cup in September 2019.

== Personal life ==
Lee Da-yeong was born on 15 October 1996 as one of twin daughters to Kim Gyeong-hui and Lee Ju-hyeong. Her mother is Kim Gyeong-hui who played as a setter for the South Korea women's national volleyball team at the 1988 Summer Olympics.

Lee studied in the Jeonju Jungsan Elementary School, the Jinju Gyeonghae Girls' Middle School and the Jinju Sunmyung Girls' High School. Her twin sister Lee Jae-yeong is also a national volleyball player.

In February 2021, several people who went to the same school club as the two sisters posted it online, that the twins had committed school violence. It is said that they also assaulted and threatened their teammates with weapons, confinement, verbal and psychological abuse, and swearing at their parents.

The sisters were both suspended indefinitely by their club after being anonymously accused of bullying online.

The Korean Volleyball Association also issued a disciplinary punishment that they have been banned from participating in the national team indefinitely as well as permanent expulsion so that they cannot be listed on the list as a volleyball coaches even after retirement.

They have however claimed that many of the bullying accusations made towards them were false, and plan on taking legal action against the anonymous author of the online post.

Lee married her then-husband in April 2018, after three months of dating. The pair separated shortly after due to the verbal and physical abuse suffered by the husband from Lee. The pair have since settled on a legal divorce in 2021.

== Clubs ==
- (South Korea) Suwon Hyundai Engineering & Construction Hillstate (2014–2020)
- (South Korea) Incheon Heungkuk Life Pink Spiders (2020–2021)
- (Greece) PAOK Thessaloniki (2021–2022)
- (Romania) CS Rapid București (2022–2023)
- (France) Volero Le Cannet (2023–2024)
- (United States) San Diego Mojo (2025-)

== Awards ==
=== Individual ===
- 2014 Asian Junior Championship "Best Setter"
- 2014-2015 Korean V-League - "All-Star Game Ceremony"
- 2015-2016 Korean V-League - "Best Dresser"
- 2015-2016 Korean V-League - "All-Star Game Ceremony"
- 2017-2018 Korean V-League - "Round 1 MVP"
- 2017-2018 Korean V-League - "All-Star Game MVP"
- 2017-2018 Korean V-League - "Best 7 - Setter"
- 2018-2019 Korean V-League - "Best 7 - Setter"
- 2019-2020 Korean V-League - "Round 3 MVP"
- 2019-2020 Korean V-League - "Best 7 - Setter"
- 2021-2022 Greek Championship - "Round 3 MVP"

=== National team ===
- 2013 The 17th Asian Women's Volleyball Championship - Bronze Medal
- 2014 The 17th Asian JR. Women's Volleyball Championship - Bronze Medal
- 2014 The 4th Asian Women's Cup Volleyball Championship - Silver medal
- 2014 The 17th Incheon Asian Games - Gold Medal
- 2018 The 18th Jakarta-Palembang Asian Games - Bronze Medal

=== Clubs ===
- 2015-2016 Korean V-League - Champion, with Suwon Hyundai Engineering & Construction Hillstate
