= Kim Jin-hee =

Kim Jin-hee (Korean: 김진희) may refer to:

- Kim Jin-hi (born 1957), South Korean composer and komungo player
- Kim Jin-hee (footballer) (born 1981), South Korean footballer
- Kim Jin-hee (tennis) (born 1981), South Korean tennis player
- Kim Jin-hee (volleyball) (born 1940), South Korean volleyball player

== See also ==
- Jin Hee Im (born 1998), South Korean golfer
