= Moon Yong-kwan =

South Korean volleyball player (born 1961)

Personal information
- Nationality: South Korean
- Born: 5 July 1961 (age 63)

Sport
- Sport: Volleyball

Moon Yong-kwan (born 5 July 1961) is a South Korean volleyball player. He competed in the men's tournament at the 1984 Summer Olympics.
