= Lee Choun-pyo =

South Korean volleyball player (born 1951)

Lee Choun-Pyo

Personal information
- Nationality: South Korean
- Born: June 9, 1951 (age 75); Seoul, South Korea

Lee Choun-Pyo (이춘표, born 9 June 1951) is a South Korean former volleyball player who competed in the 1976 Summer Olympics.
