= Lee Bum-joo =

South Korean volleyball player (born 1959)

Personal information
- Nationality: South Korean
- Born: 2 February 1959 (age 67)

Sport
- Sport: Volleyball

Lee Bum-joo (born 2 February 1959) is a South Korean volleyball player. He competed in the men's tournament at the 1984 Summer Olympics.
