= Kang Doo-tae =

South Korean volleyball player (born 1958)

Personal information
- Nationality: South Korean
- Born: 31 July 1958 (age 66)

Sport
- Sport: Volleyball

Kang Doo-tae (born 31 July 1958) is a South Korean volleyball player. He competed in the men's tournament at the 1984 Summer Olympics.
