= Kim Chung-han =

South Korean volleyball player (born 1950)

Kim Chung-Han

Personal information
- Full name: Kim Chung-Han
- Nationality: South Korean
- Born: February 3, 1950 (age 76); South Korea
- Height: 180 cm (5 ft 11 in)
- Weight: 75 kg (165 lb)

Volleyball information
- Position: Setter

Kim Chung-Han (born 3 February 1950) is a South Korean former volleyball player who competed in the 1972 Summer Olympics and in the 1976 Summer Olympics, finishing in 7th and 6th place respectively .
