= Lee Yong-kwan =

South Korean volleyball player (born 1950)

Lee Yong-Kwan

Personal information
- Born: December 17, 1950 (age 75); South Korea

Lee Yong-Kwan (born 17 December 1950) is a South Korean former volleyball player who competed in the 1972 Summer Olympics and in the 1976 Summer Olympics.
