= Lee Sun-koo =

South Korean volleyball player (born 1952)

Lee Sun-Koo

Personal information
- Born: March 5, 1952 (age 74); South Korea

Lee Sun-Koo (born 5 March 1952) is a South Korean former volleyball player who competed in the 1972 Summer Olympics and in the 1976 Summer Olympics.
