= T. P. Padmanabhan Nair =

Indian volleyball player

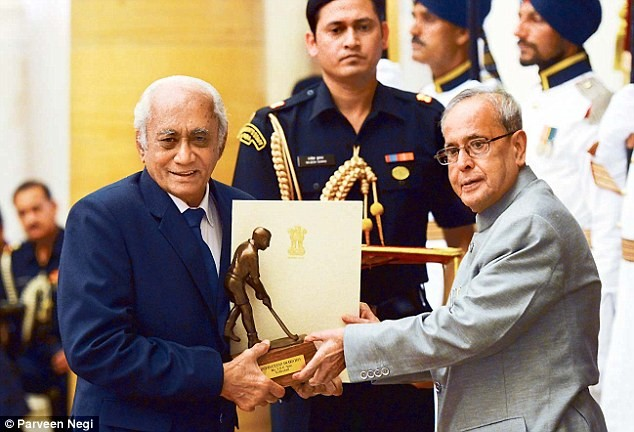
- T.P.P.Nair receiving the Dhyan Chand Lifetime Achievement Award

Personal information
- Full name: Thekkumpadan Puthanveettil Padmanabhan Nair
- Nickname: T. P. P. Nair
- Nationality: Indian
- Born: 1935 (age 90–91); Cherukunnu, Kannur, Kerala, India
- Hometown: Kannur, Kerala, India

National team
India
Honours
Representing India
Asian Games
Silver medal – second place	1962 Asian Games	Team
Bronze medal – third place	1958 Asian Games	Team

T. P. Padmanabhan Nair also known as T. P. P. Nair was a volleyball player, former captain and coach of Indian National Volleyball Team. He was the first Malayali to become the captain of the national volleyball team. In 2015, he received Dhyan Chand Award the highest sports award in the country. He is the only Indian volleyball player to have won two Asian Games medals.

== Biography ==
Thekkumpadan Puthanveettil Padmanabhan Nair was born in Cherukunnu village in Kannur district of Kerala. After studying in Cherukunnu High School, he joined Indian Air Force in 1951. Vazhkulam Joseph, a former Air Force team captain and a member of the Indian team, made him a volleyball player. Later he joined in Services team and was selected to National team.

He joined Indian Railways in 1960 and retired in 1992 as a Senior Technical Assistant. After retirement, he lives in Mumbai with his son Pradeep.

He was the Railway Team Coach from 1966 to 1987, the Maharashtra Men's Team Coach in 1966, and the Manager until 1992, the Liaison Officer at the Delhi Asiad in 1982 and the Railways Women's Team Coach.

== Awards and honors ==
- 2015: Dhyan Chand Award
- 2022 :Road named as T.P.Padmanabhan Nair Marg (formerly called Jangid Complex Rd) at Mira Road East on 2nd Oct 2022 by Mira Bhayander Municipal Corporation
- 2022 :Road named as T.P.Padmanaban Nair Road at his hometown Kannapuram, Kannur on 27 Jan 2022 by Kannapuram Panchayat

== Family ==
His wife Meenakshi is from Pallavur, Palakkad. They have two children.
