= Lee Chae-on =

South Korean volleyball player (born 1963)

Personal information
- Nationality: South Korean
- Born: 28 May 1963 (age 62)

Sport
- Sport: Volleyball

Lee Chae-on (born 28 May 1963) is a South Korean volleyball player. He competed in the men's tournament at the 1988 Summer Olympics.
