= Park Sun-chool =

South Korean volleyball player (born 1973)

Personal information
- Nationality: South Korean
- Born: 9 November 1973 (age 52)

Sport
- Sport: Volleyball

Park Sun-chul (born 9 November 1973) is a South Korean volleyball player. He competed in the men's tournament at the 1996 Summer Olympics.
