= P. Bharathan Nair =

Indian volleyball player

Personal information
- Nationality: Indian
- Born: Changanassery, Kottayam, Kerala, India
- Hometown: Changanassery

National team
India
Honours
Representing India
Asian Games
Bronze medal – third place	1958 Asian Games	Team

P. Bharathan Nair was an Indian volleyball player and captain of the India national volleyball team. He was part of the Indian team that won a bronze medal at the 1958 Asian Games. As of 2021, He is the only Indian volleyball player to have participated in the World Championship and the Asian Games.

== Biography ==
He was born in Puzhavathu, Changanassery in Kottayam district of Kerala, India. His son Praveen says he was a long jumper and swimmer when he was young. He joined the Indian Railways and was posted to Mumbai.

He died in 2007, at the age of 81.

== Career as a volleyball player ==
Bharathan Nair made his senior national debut in 1955. He was part of the Indian team that won a bronze medal at the 1958 Asian Games and he also played in the 1956 World Volleyball Championship in Paris. He captained the Indian volleyball team at the 1963 Pre-Olympic qualifiers in New Delhi. Bharathan captained the Services team when it won the national title in Allahabad in 1956.

== Honours ==
In 2020, the Changanassery Municipal Council passed a resolution to name a road in Bharathan Nair's birthplace after him.
