= Yang Jin-soo =

South Korean volleyball player (born 1948)

Personal information
- Nationality: South Korean
- Born: 12 June 1948 (age 77); Yongkwan, South Korea

Sport
- Sport: Volleyball

Yang Jin-soo (born 12 June 1948) is a South Korean volleyball player. She competed in the women's tournament at the 1968 Summer Olympics.
