= Su Liqun =

Chinese volleyball player (born 1972)

Personal information
- Born: 16 October 1972 (age 54)
- Height: 177 cm (5 ft 10 in)

Volleyball information
- Position: Middle blocker
- Number: 6

National team
1990–1994	China
Honours
Women's volleyball
Representing China
World Championship
Silver medal – second place	1990 China	Team
Asian Games
Gold medal – first place	1990 Beijing	Team
Silver medal – second place	1994 Hiroshima	Team

Su Liqun (born 16 October 1972) is a Chinese former volleyball player who competed in the 1992 Summer Olympics in Barcelona. Previously, she won a silver medal with the Chinese team at the 1990 FIVB World Championship in China.
