= Kota Yamamura =

Japanese volleyball player

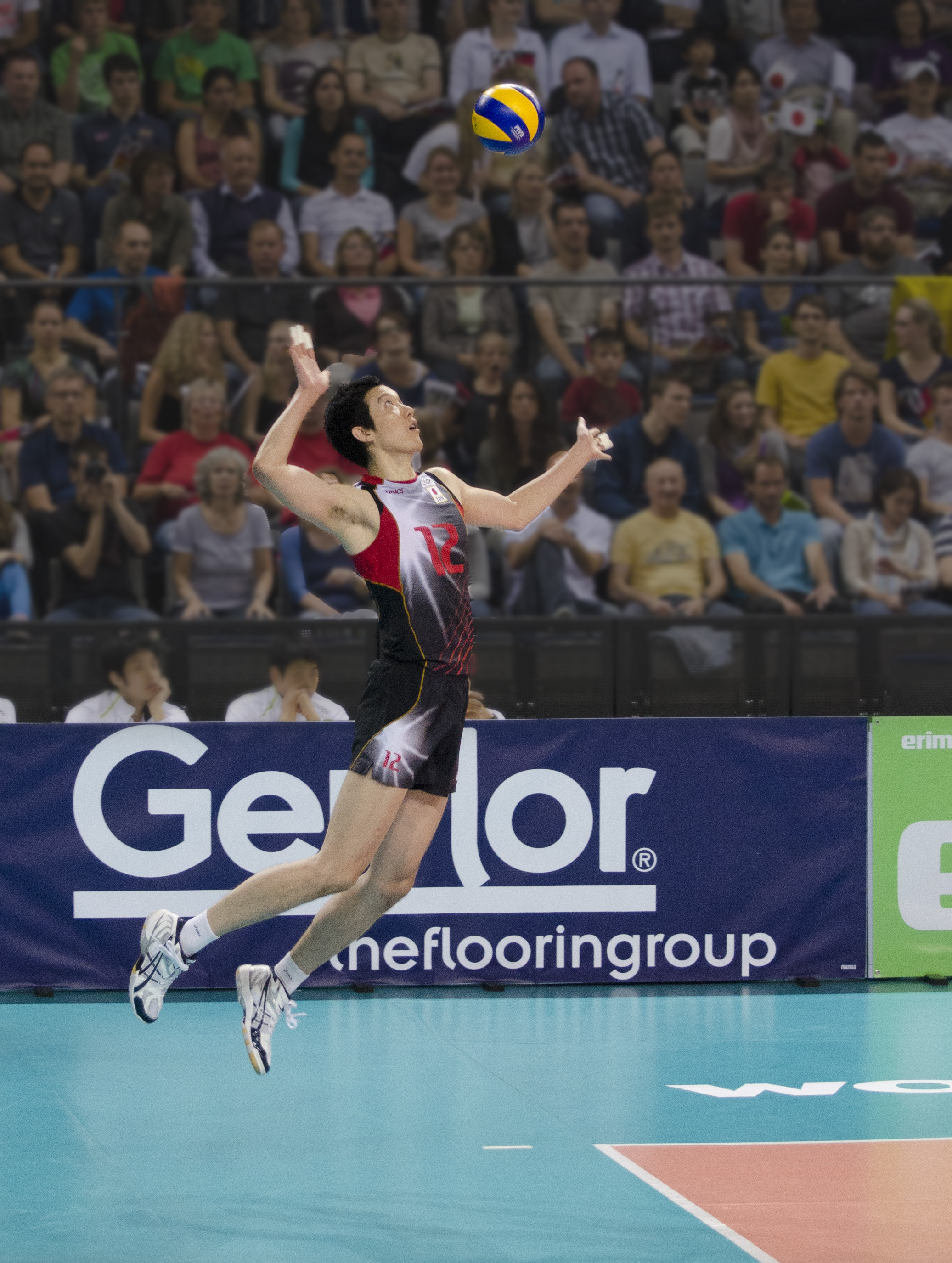

Personal information
- Full name: Kota Yamamura
- Nickname: Kota
- Nationality: Japanese
- Born: October 20, 1980 (age 46); Higashimurayama, Tokyo, Japan
- Height: 2.05 m (6 ft 9 in)
- Weight: 90 kg (198 lb)
- Spike: 346 cm (136 in)
- Block: 340 cm (130 in)
- Education: University of Tsukuba

Coaching information
- Current team: (Japan) Suntory Sunbirds
Previous teams coached
Years	Teams
2020–present	(Japan) Suntory Sunbirds

Volleyball information
- Position: Middle blocker

Career
Years	Teams
N/A	(Japan) University of Tsukuba
2003–2014	(Japan) Suntory Sunbirds

National team
2002–2013	Japan
Medal record
Men's volleyball
Representing Japan
World Grand Champions Cup
Bronze medal – third place	2009 Osaka / Nagoya	Team
Asian Games
Gold medal – first place	2010 Guangzhou	Team
Bronze medal – third place	2002 Busan	Team
Asian Championship
Gold medal – first place	2009 Manila	Team
Silver medal – second place	2007 Jakarta	Team

Kota Yamamura (山村宏太 Yamamura Kota, born October 20, 1980) is a retired Japanese national volleyball player and used to play for Suntory Sunbirds on club level. He is currently active as Sunbirds' head coach.

He used to be the captain for the Japan men's national volleyball team in 2013.

== Club ==
- (Japan) Kinjo High School
- (Japan) University of Tsukuba
- (Japan) Suntory Sunbirds (2003–2014)

== Awards ==
=== Individuals ===
- 2007-08 Men's V.Premier League – "Best 6"
- 2008-09 Men's V.Premier League – "Best Spike" and "Best 6"
- 2013 62nd Kurowashi Tournament – "Best 6"

=== Team ===
- 2003-04 V.League – Champion, with Suntory Sunbirds.
- 2004-05 V.League – 5th place, with Suntory Sunbirds.
- 2005-06 V.League – Runner-Up, with Suntory Sunbirds.
- 2006-07 V.Premier League – Champion, with Suntory Sunbirds.
- 2007-08 V.Premier League – 3rd place, with Suntory Sunbirds
- 2008-09 V.Premier League – 4th place, with Suntory Sunbirds.
- 2009-10 V.Premier League – 5th place, with Suntory Sunbirds.
- 2010-11 V.Premier League – Runner-Up, with Suntory Sunbirds.
- 2011-12 V.Premier League – 3rd place, with Suntory Sunbirds.
- 2012-13 V.Premier League – 4th place, with Suntory Sunbirds.
- 2013 Kurowashiki All Japan Volleyball Championship – Champion, with Suntory Sunbirds.
- 2013-14 V.Premier League – 6th place, with Suntory Sunbirds.
- 2014 Kurowashiki All Japan Volleyball Championship – 3rd place, with Suntory Sunbirds.

== National team ==
=== Senior team ===
- 2002 World League – 13th place
- 2002 Asian Games – Bronze Medal
- 2003 World League – 13th place
- 2005 World Grand Champions Cup – 4th place
- 2005 World League – 10th place
- 2005 Asian Championship – Gold Medal
- 2006 World Championship – 8th place
- 2006 Asian Games – 5th place
- 2006 World League – 13th place
- 2007 World Cup – 9th place
- 2007 World League – 13th place
- 2007 Asian Championship – Silver medal
- 2008 Summer Olympics – 11th place
- 2008 World League – 6th place
- 2009 World Grand Champions Cup – Bronze Medal
- 2009 World League – 15th place
- 2010 World Championship – 8th place
- 2010 Asian Games – Gold Medal
- 2011 World Cup – 10th place
- 2011 World League – 10th place
- 2011 Asian Championship – 5th place
- 2012 World League – 15th place
- 2013 World Grand Champions Cup – 6th place
- 2013 World League – 18th place
- 2013 Asian Championship – 4th place
