= Masayoshi Manabe =

Japanese volleyball player (born 1963)

Personal information
- Born: 21 August 1963 (age 63); Himeji, Hyōgo, Japan
- Height: 1.87 m (6 ft 2 in)

Volleyball information
- Position: Setter
- Number: 5

National team
1985–2003	Japan
Honours
Men's volleyball
Representing Japan
Goodwill Games
Bronze medal – third place	1986 Moscow
Asian Games
Bronze medal – third place	1990 Beijing	Team
Women's Volleyball
Representing Japan
FIVB Nations League
Silver medal – second place	2024 Bangkok	Team

Masayoshi Manabe (真鍋 政義 Manabe Masayoshi, born 21 August 1963) is a Japanese volleyball coach and former player, who played as a setter for the Japanese men's national volleyball team in the 1980s and 1990s. Manabe played at the 1988 Summer Olympics in Seoul, where he finished in tenth place. He competed at the 1986 Goodwill Games in Moscow and won a bronze medal.

Manabe took fifteenth place at the 1998 World Championship in Japan.

== Coaching ==
In December 2008, the Japan Volleyball Association announced it had invited him to be the head coach of the Japanese women's national volleyball team.

== Honours ==
- 1986 Goodwill Games — 3rd place
- 1988 Olympic Games — 10th place
- 1990 Asian Games — 3rd place
- 1998 World Championship — 15th place
