= Tomoko Yoshihara =

Japanese volleyball player

Personal information
- Born: 4 February 1970 (age 56); Uryū District, Hokkaido, Japan
- Hometown: Tokyo
- Height: 1.80 m (5 ft 11 in)
- Weight: 63 kg (139 lb)
- Spike: 305 cm (120 in)
- Block: 295 cm (116 in)

Volleyball information
- Position: Middle blocker
- Number: 10 (1992); 5 (1996); 1 (2004)

National team
1990–2004	Japan
Honours
Women's volleyball
Representing Japan
Goodwill Games
Bronze medal – third place	1994 Saint Petersburg	Team
Asian Games
Bronze medal – third place	1990 Beijing	Team
Bronze medal – third place	1994 Hiroshima	Team

Tomoko Yoshihara (吉原知子 Yoshihara Tomoko, born 4 February 1970) is a former volleyball player from Japan who competed at the 1992, 1996, and 2004 Summer Olympics. Yoshihara captained the 2004 Olympic squad. She was named Best Server at the 1994 FIVB World Championship in Brazil, where she finished in seventh place. She won a bronze medal at the 1994 Goodwill Games in Saint Petersburg. Yoshihara played as a middle blocker.

== Coaching ==
In June 2015, Yoshihara was named the head coach of the JT Marvelous volleyball team.

== Personal life ==
After retiring from playing volleyball in 2006, Yoshihara completed a master's programme at the University of Tsukuba.

== Honours ==
- 1990: 8th place in the World Championship
- 1991: 7th place in the World Cup
- 1992: 5th place in the Olympic Games
- 1994: 3rd Place in the Goodwill Games
- 1994: 7th place in the World Championship
- 1995: 6th place in the World Cup
- 1996: 9th place in the Olympic Games
- 2003: 5th place in the World Cup
- 2004: 5th place in the Olympic Games

== Individual awards ==
- 1994 World Championship "Best Server"
