= Chung Sun-hung =

South Korean volleyball player

Personal information
- Nationality: South Korean
- Born: 12 October 1938 (age 86)

Sport
- Sport: Volleyball

Chung Sun-hung (born 12 October 1938) is a South Korean volleyball player. He competed in the men's tournament at the 1964 Summer Olympics.
