= Katsuyuki Minami =

Japanese volleyball player (born 1970)

Personal information
- Born: 30 September 1970 (age 56); Nobeoka, Miyazaki, Japan
- Height: 2.00 m (6 ft 7 in)

Volleyball information
- Position: Middle blocker
- Number: 10

National team
1990–2005	Japan
Honours
Men's volleyball
Representing Japan
Asian Games
Gold medal – first place	1994 Hiroshima	Team
Bronze medal – third place	1990 Beijing	Team

Katsuyuki Minami (南 克幸, Minami Katsuyuki; born 30 September 1970, in Nobeoka, Miyazaki) is a former volleyball player from Japan, who played as a middle blocker for the Men's National Team in the 1990s. He played at the 1992 Summer Olympics in Barcelona, finishing in sixth place. He finished in tenth place at the 1998 World Championship in Japan.

== Honours ==
- 1992 Olympic Games — 6th place
- 1998 World Championship — 16th place
