= Yuichi Nakagaichi =

Japanese volleyball player

Personal information
- Full name: Yuichi Nakagaichi
- Born: 2 November 1967 (age 58); Fukui, Fukui, Japan
- Height: 1.94 m (6 ft 4 in)
- Weight: 90 kg (198 lb)

Coaching information
Previous teams coached
| Years | Teams |
|---|---|
| 2017–2021 | Japan men's national team |

Volleyball information
- Position: Outside hitter
- Number: 3

National team
| 1989–1998 | Japan |
Honours
Men's volleyball
Representing Japan
Asian Games
| Gold medal – first place | 1994 Hiroshima | Team |
| Bronze medal – third place | 1990 Beijing | Team |

Yuichi Nakagaichi (中垣内 祐一, Nakagaichi Yuichi; born 2 November 1967) is a professional volleyball coach from Japan. Nakagaichi was a top player for the Japanese men's national volleyball team in the 1990s. Nakagaichi played at the 1992 Summer Olympics in Barcelona, and he also competed at the 1998 FIVB World Championship in Japan.

== Coaching ==
Nakagaichi was the head coach of the Japanese men's national volleyball team from 2017 to 2021, leading his team as runners-up in the 2021 Asian Men's Volleyball Championship.

== Controversies ==
In November 2016, shortly after an announcement of becoming Japan's men's national team head coach, Nakagaichi was suspected of negligence in allegedly hitting a 41-year-old traffic guard while driving on the Chugoku Expressway in the city of Shobara, Hiroshima prefecture, on 9 November. Nakagaichi told the police that he mistakenly applied the brake of his car, causing it to skid and plow into the victim, according to police officers.

In 2017, the Japan Volleyball Association was considering a temporary replacement for Nakagaichi after he stepped back from the role following this incident. The association retained him as coach under the expectation that a criminal charge would be handed down within three months.

== Honours ==
=== As player ===
- 1990 Asian Games — 3rd place
- 1992 Olympic Games — 6th place
- 1994 Asian Games — Champion
- 1998 FIVB World Championship — 16th place

=== As coach ===
- 2017 Asian Men's Volleyball Championship — Champion
- 2017 FIVB Volleyball World League — 14th place
- 2017 FIVB Volleyball Men's World Grand Champions Cup — 6th place
- 2018 FIVB Volleyball Men's Nations League — 12th place
- 2018 FIVB Volleyball Men's World Championship — 17th place
- 2018 Asian Men's Volleyball Cup — 3rd place
- 2018 Asian Games — 5th place
- 2019 FIVB Volleyball Men's Nations League — 10th place
- 2019 Asian Men's Volleyball Championship — 3rd place
- 2019 FIVB Volleyball Men's World Cup — 4th place
- 2021 FIVB Volleyball Men's Nations League — 11th place
- 2020 Summer Olympics (was held in 2021) — 7th place
- 2021 Asian Men's Volleyball Championship — Runners-up
