= Yang Jin-wung =

South Korean volleyball player (born 1964)

Personal information
- Nationality: South Korean
- Born: 22 October 1964 (age 60)

Sport
- Sport: Volleyball

Yang Jin-wung (born 22 October 1964) is a South Korean volleyball player. He competed in the men's tournament at the 1984 Summer Olympics.
