= Masaji Ogino =

Japanese volleyball player (born 1970)

Masay Ogino
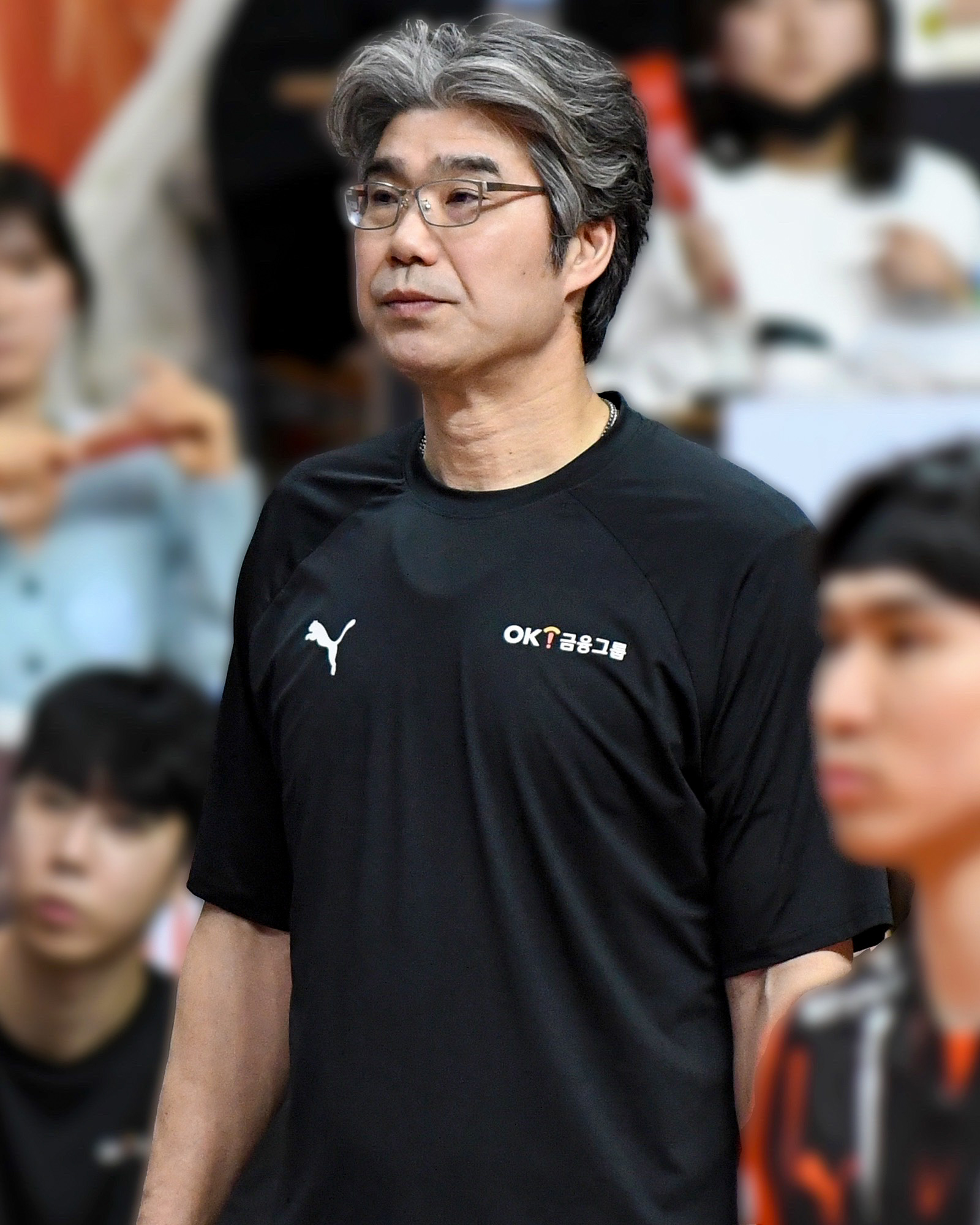
- Ogino in 2024

Personal information
- Born: 8 January 1970 (age 56); Wakasa, Fukui, Japan
- Height: 1.97 m (6 ft 6 in)
- Weight: 85 kg (187 lb)

Volleyball information
- Position: Outside hitter
- Number: 8 (national team)

National team
1990–2008	Japan
Honours
Men's volleyball
Representing Japan
Asian Games
Bronze medal – third place	1990 Beijing	Team

Masaji Ogino (荻野 正二 Ogino Masaji, born 8 January 1970, in Onyū District, Fukui) is a former volleyball player from Japan, who played for the Men's National Team in the 1990s and the 2000s. He ended up in sixteenth place at the 1998 World Championship in Japan.

== Honours ==
- 1992 Olympic Games — 6th place
- 1998 World Championship — 16th place
- 2006 World Championship — 8th place
- 2007 FIVB World Cup — 9th place
