= Yoo Joong-tak =

South Korean volleyball player (born 1960)

Personal information
- Nationality: South Korean
- Born: 24 May 1960 (age 66)

Sport
- Sport: Volleyball

Yoo Joong-tak (born 24 May 1960) is a South Korean volleyball player. He competed in the men's tournament at the 1984 Summer Olympics.
