= Ahsanollah Shirkavand =

Iranian volleyball player

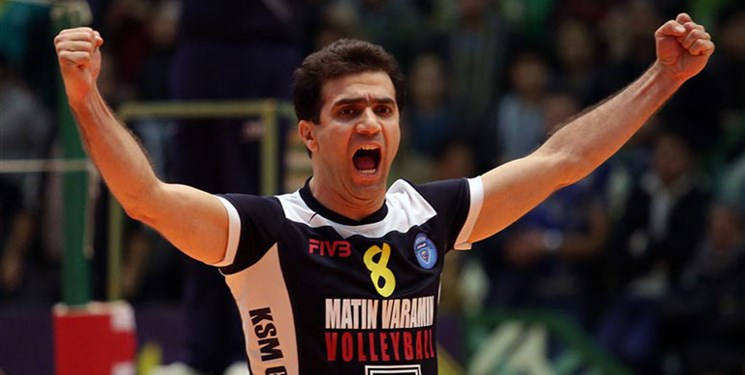

Personal information
- Born: March 18, 1981 (age 45); Varamin, Tehran Province, Iran
- Height: 1.80 m (5 ft 11 in)
- Weight: 75 kg (165 lb)
- Spike: 3.00 m (118 in)
- Block: 2.96 m (117 in)

Volleyball information
- Position: libero
- Current club: (Iran) Shahrdari Varamin

Career
Teams
	(Iran) Persepolis (Iran) Bazyaft-e Tehran (Iran) Bargh Tehran (Iran) Paykan Tehran (Iran) Sanam Tehran (Iran) Saipa Alborz (Iran) Petrochimi Mahshahr (Iran) Shahrdari Urmia (Iran) Shahrdari Varamin

National team
Iran U19; Iran U21; Iran
Honours
Representing Iran
Men's volleyball
Asian Games
Silver medal – second place	2002 Bousan	Team
Asian Championship
Bronze medal – third place	2003 China	Team
Asian Cup
Gold medal – first place	2008 Thailand	Team

Ahsanollah Shirkavand (Persian: احسن‌الله شیرکوند; born 18 March 1981 in Varamin, Tehran Province) is an Iranian volleyball libero. After playing at the Asian Youth Games, he was invited to the Iran Men's National Volleyball Team and played for it from 1998 to 2000 who finished fourth at the Asian Men's Volleyball Championship. Shirkavand continued playing for the National Team under the coaching of Julio Velasco until 2013, when he was forced to leave national games due to injury.

== Clubs ==
Bazyaft-e Tehran, Bargh Tehran, Paykan Tehran (seven years in total), Saipa Alborz (two years), Sanam Tehran (two years), Persepolis (one year), Petrochimi Mahshahr (one year), Shahrdari Urmia (one year), Shahrdari Varamin (three years).

Shirkavand started his national professional career with Iran's men's Iran men's national under-19 volleyball teamUnder-19, Under-21, and finally with the National team. He has finished first with Paykan Club three times and with Sanam Tehran once, while finishing second with Shahrdari Varamin twice. Among other titles gained by him are a second place with Sanam Tehran and a third place with Shahrdari Urmia.

== Honours ==
Starting with Persepolis Club in Tehran in 1995, Shirkavand has played for a number of Iranian clubs.

=== National team ===
- Asian Games
  - : Busan, South Korea, 2002
- Asian Championship
  - :Tianjin, China, 2003
- Asian Cup
  - : Nakhon Ratchasima, Thailand, 2008

=== Club ===
- with Paykan Tehran:
  - Gold medal: three times at Asian Championship
  - Silver medal: one time at Asian Championship
- with Matin Varamin:
  - Gold medal: one time at Asian Championship
- with Saipa Tehran:
  - Silver medal: one time at Asian Championship
- with Paykan Tehran:
  - Bronze medal: one time at World Championship (2010)
- with Paykan Tehran:
  - 4th place: one time at World Championship (2009)
- with Matin Varamin:
  - 4th place: one time at World Championship (2013)

=== Individual ===
- Best libero: 1998 Junior Championship
