= Kiyoko Fukuda (volleyball) =

Japanese volleyball player (born 1970)

Personal information
- Born: 4 August 1970 (age 56); Kawaguchi, Saitama, Japan
- Height: 1.78 m (5 ft 10 in)

Volleyball information
- Position: Outside hitter
- Number: 11

National team
1989–1994	Japan
Honours
Women's volleyball
Representing Japan
Goodwill Games
Bronze medal – third place	1994 Saint Petersburg	Team
Asian Games
Bronze medal – third place	1990 Beijing	Team
Bronze medal – third place	1994 Hiroshima	Team

Kiyoko Fukuda (born 4 August 1970) is a Japanese former volleyball player who competed with the Japanese women's national volleyball team at the 1992 Summer Olympics in Barcelona. She helped Japan win the bronze medal at the 1994 Goodwill Games in Saint Petersburg.
