= Pan Wenli =

Chinese volleyball player

Personal information
- Nationality: Chinese
- Born: 8 March 1969 (age 57)
- Height: 183 cm (6 ft 0 in)

Volleyball information
- Position: Outside hitter
- Current club: retired

National team
1986–1996	China
Honours
Women's volleyball
Representing China
Olympic Games
Silver medal – second place	1996 Atlanta	Team
FIVB World Cup
Bronze medal – third place	1995 Japan	Team
FIVB World Grand Prix
Silver medal – second place	1993 Hong Kong
World Grand Champions Cup
Silver medal – second place	1993 Japan
Asian Games
Silver medal – second place	1994 Hiroshima	Team

Pan Wenli (Chinese: 潘文莉; pinyin: Pān Wénlì, born 8 March 1969) is a retired Chinese female volleyball player. Pan was part of the Chinese women's national volleyball team that won the silver medal at the 1996 Summer Olympics in Atlanta. She also participated at the 1994 FIVB World Championship in Brazil, winning bronze medal.

== Coaching ==
Pan was an assistant coach at the University of Toronto.

== Clubs ==
- (China) Bayi (1984–1997)
- (Japan) Hitachi Rivale (1997–1999)
- (Italy) Phone Limited Modena (1999–2000)
- (Italy) Vini Monte Schiavo Jesi (2000–2001)
- (Italy) Pallavolo Palermo (2001–2002)
- (Turkey) Vakıfbank Istanbul (2001–2002)
- (China) Bayi (2002–2003)
- (Italy) Rebecchi River Volley Rivergaro (2003–2004)

Awards
Preceded by First Award	Best Blocker of FIVB World Grand Prix; 1993	Succeeded by (Brazil) Marcia Cunha
