= Chie Tsuji =

Japanese volleyball player

Personal information
- Born: 9 August 1969 (age 57); Yamanashi Prefecture, Japan
- Height: 1.77 m (5 ft 10 in)

Volleyball information
- Position: Setter
- Number: 3 (1994)

National team
1990–2004	Japan
Honours
Women's volleyball
Representing Japan
Goodwill Games
Bronze medal – third place	1994 Saint Petersburg	Team
Asian Games
Bronze medal – third place	1990 Beijing	Team
Bronze medal – third place	1994 Hiroshima	Team

Chie Tsuji (辻 知恵; born 9 August 1969) is a former volleyball player from Japan. Her maiden name was Chie Natori (名取 知恵, Natori Chie). Tsuji competed with the Japan women's national volleyball team at the 2004 Summer Olympics in Athens, where she finished in fifth place. She won a bronze medal at the 1994 Goodwill Games in Saint Petersburg. Tsuji played as a setter.
