= Cho Jae-hak =

South Korean volleyball player (born 1949)

- Hangul: 조재학
- Hanja: 趙載學
- RR: Jo Jaehak
- MR: Cho Chaehak

Cho Jae-hak (Korean: 조재학; born 28 February 1949) is a South Korean former volleyball player who competed in the 1976 Summer Olympics.
