= Jin Jun-tak =

South Korean volleyball player (born 1949)

Jin Jun-Tak

Personal information
- Born: May 17, 1949 (age 77); South Korea

Jin Jun-Tak (born 17 May 1949) is a South Korean former volleyball player who competed in the 1972 Summer Olympics.
