= Chang Yoon-hee =

South Korean volleyball player (born 1970)

Personal information
- Full name: Chang Yoon-hee
- Nationality: South Korean
- Born: 22 May 1970 (age 56); Namwon, North Jeolla Province, South Korea
- Height: 1.70 m (5 ft 7 in)
- Education: Korea National Sport University

Volleyball information
- Position: Outside hitter
- Number: 4 (national team)

Career
Years	Teams
1988–1996; 1996–2001; 2011	(South Korea) Honam Oil (South Korea) LG Oil (South Korea) GS Caltex Seoul KIXX

National team
1989–1998	South Korea

- Chang Yoon-hee
- Hangul: 장윤희
- Hanja: 張潤喜
- RR: Jang Yunhui
- MR: Chang Yunhŭi

Chang Yoon-hee
Medal record

Women's volleyball

Representing South Korea

World Grand Prix
Bronze medal – third place	1997 Kobe	

Asian Games
Gold medal – first place	1994 Hiroshima	team
Silver medal – second place	1990 Beijing	team
Silver medal – second place	1998 Bangkok	team

Chang Yoon-hee (Korean: 장윤희; born 22 May 1970) is a retired South Korean female volleyball player. She was part of the South Korea women's national volleyball team. On the club level she played with Honam Oil, which later became LG Oil and then GS Caltex.

Chang made a strong start to her career by winning the Most Valuable Player of the Year award in 1989. She was named "best server" at the 1989 FIVB Volleyball Women's World Cup, and "best defender" at the 1991 FIVB Volleyball Women's World Cup. In 1996, she stated that she had no intention of getting married or retiring in the near future. After the 1996 Summer Olympics, she stepped down from the national team, but continued to play at the club level. She married national cycling team member Lee Kyung-hwan in April 1997. Though initially concerned about her ability to balance married life and the demands of volleyball, she returned to the national team again in 1998. She retired in 2002, and later became a coach for GS Caltex.

== Clubs ==
- Honam Oil (1994)

== Awards ==
- 1989 World Cup "Best Server"
- 1991 World Cup "Best Defender"
