= Kiyomi Sakamoto =

Japanese volleyball player (born 1969)

Personal information
- Born: 12 October 1969 (age 57); Toyonaka, Osaka, Japan
- Height: 1.74 m (5 ft 9 in)

Volleyball information
- Position: Outside hitter
- Number: 10

National team
1990, 1996	Japan
Honours
Women's volleyball
Representing Japan
Asian Games
Bronze medal – third place	1990 Beijing	Team

Kiyomi Sakamoto (坂本 清美, Sakamoto Kiyomi) (born 12 October 1969) is a Japanese former volleyball player who competed in the 1996 Summer Olympics in Atlanta.

In 1996, Sakamoto was eliminated with the Japanese team in the preliminary round of the Olympic tournament.
