= Bang Ji-sub =

South Korean volleyball player (born 1974)

Personal information
- Nationality: South Korean
- Born: 16 April 1974 (age 52)

Sport
- Sport: Volleyball

Bang Ji-sub (born 16 April 1974) is a South Korean volleyball player. He competed in the men's tournament at the 2000 Summer Olympics.
