= Masayuki Izumikawa =

Japanese volleyball player (born 1971)

Personal information
- Born: 22 January 1971 (age 55); Tachikawa, Tokyo, Japan
- Height: 1.96 m (6 ft 5 in)

Volleyball information
- Position: Outside hitter
- Number: 15
Honours
Men's volleyball
Representing Japan
Asian Games
Gold medal – first place	1994 Hiroshima	Team
Bronze medal – third place	2002 Busan	Team

Masayuki Izumikawa (泉川 正幸, Izumikawa Masayuki) (born 22 January 1971) is a Japanese former volleyball player who competed in the 1992 Summer Olympics in Barcelona. He also competed in the Summer Universiade in 1993 as the main outside hitter of his national squad, winning a gold medal.
