= Ichiko Sato =

Japanese volleyball player

Personal information
- Nationality: Japanese
- Born: 11 March 1965 (age 61); Sendai, Miyagi, Japan
- Height: 1.69 m (5 ft 7 in)

Volleyball information
- Position: Outside hitter
- Number: 6 (1988); 1 (1992)

National team
1985–1992	Japan
Honours
Women's volleyball
Representing Japan
Asian Games
Silver medal – second place	1986 Seoul	Team
Bronze medal – third place	1990 Beijing	Team

Ichiko Sato (佐藤 伊知子, Satō Ichiko; born 11 March 1965) is a Japanese former volleyball player who competed in the 1988 Summer Olympics in Seoul and 1992 Summer Olympics in Barcelona. In 1988, she finished fourth with the Japanese team in the Olympic tournament. Four years later, she finished fifth with the Japanese team in the 1992 Olympic tournament.
