= Lai Yawen =

Chinese volleyball player

Personal information
- Born: 9 September 1970 (age 56); Dalian, China
- Height: 187 cm (6 ft 2 in)

Volleyball information
- Position: Middle blocker
- Number: 1 (1989, 1991–1998); 4 (1990)

National team
1989–1998	China
Honours
Women's volleyball
Representing China
Olympic Games
Silver medal – second place	1996 Atlanta	Team
World Championship
Silver medal – second place	1990 China	Team
Silver medal – second place	1998 Japan	Team
FIVB World Cup
Bronze medal – third place	1989 Japan
Silver medal – second place	1991 Japan
Bronze medal – third place	1995 Japan	Team
FIVB World Grand Prix
Silver medal – second place	1993 Hong Kong
World Grand Champions Cup
Silver medal – second place	1993 Japan
Asian Women's Volleyball Championship
Gold medal – first place	1989 Hong Kong
Gold medal – first place	1991 Bangkok
Gold medal – first place	1993 Shanghai
Gold medal – first place	1995 Chiang Mai
Gold medal – first place	1997 Manila
Asian Games
Gold medal – first place	1990 Beijing	Team
Silver medal – second place	1994 Hiroshima	Team
Gold medal – first place	1998 Bangkok	Team

Lai Yawen (Chinese: 赖亚文; pinyin: Lài Yàwén, born 9 September 1970) is a Chinese former volleyball player and two-time Olympian. As a player, Lai competed with the national team at the 1992 Summer Olympics in Barcelona, where she finished seventh. She then won a silver medal with the national team at the 1996 Summer Olympics in Atlanta.

== Coaching and management ==
Lai was an assistant coach of China's women's national volleyball team from 1999 to 2004, and then from 2009 to 2021. She has been working as the deputy director of China's Volleyball Management Center.
