= Kim Kun-bong =

South Korean volleyball player (born 1945)

Kim Kun-Bong

Personal information
- Full name: Kim Kun-Bong
- Born: August 24, 1945 (age 81); South Korea

Kim Kun-Bong (born 24 August 1945) is a South Korean former volleyball player who competed in the 1972 Munich Summer Olympics and in the 1976 Montreal Summer Olympics.
