= Takashi Narita =

Japanese volleyball player (born 1969)

Tagashi Narita

Personal information
- Born: 6 October 1969 (age 57); Noboribetsu, Hokkaido, Japan
- Height: 1.85 m (6 ft 1 in)
- Weight: 70 kg (154 lb)

Volleyball information
- Position: Setter
- Number: 1 (national team)

National team
1990–1998	Japan
Honours
Men's volleyball
Representing Japan
Asian Games
Gold medal – first place	1994 Hiroshima	Team
Bronze medal – third place	1990 Beijing	Team

Takashi Narita (成田 貴志, Narita Takashi) (born October 6, 1969) is a former volleyball player from Japan, who played as a setter for the Men's National Team in the 1990s. He competed at the 1992 Summer Olympics in Barcelona. He also competed in the 1998 World Championship in Japan, where he placed 16th.

== Honours ==
- 1992 Olympic Games — 6th place
- 1998 World Championship — 16th place
