= Kang Man-soo =

South Korean volleyball player (born 1955)

- Hangul: 강만수
- Hanja: 姜萬守
- RR: Gang Mansu
- MR: Kang Mansu

Kang Man-Soo (born 24 August 1955) is a South Korean former volleyball player who competed in the 1972 Summer Olympics, in the 1976 Summer Olympics, and in the 1984 Summer Olympics.
