= Lee In (volleyball) =

South Korean volleyball player (born 1952)

Lee In (born 22 August 1952) is a South Korean former volleyball player who competed in the 1976 Summer Olympics.
