= Bang Sin-bong =

South Korean volleyball player (born 1975)

Bang Sin-Bong

Personal information
- Nationality: South Korean
- Born: 6 February 1975 (age 51)
- Height: 198 cm (6 ft 6 in)
- Weight: 85 kg (187 lb)

National team
| 2000 | South Korea |

Bang Sin-Bong (born 6 February 1975) is a former South Korean male volleyball player. He was part of the South Korea men's national volleyball team. He competed with the national team at the 2000 Summer Olympics in Sydney, Australia, finishing 9th.

== See also ==
- South Korea at the 2000 Summer Olympics
