= Zhang Di (volleyball) =

Chinese volleyball player

Personal information
- Nationality: Chinese
- Height: 194 cm (6 ft 4 in)

Volleyball information

Career
- Years: Team
- 1994: Army

National team
- Years: Team
- 1994: China

Zhang Di is a former Chinese male volleyball player. He was part of the China men's national volleyball team. He played for Bayi (Army) Keming Surface Industry.

== Clubs ==
- Army (1994)
