= Lee Jong-kyung (volleyball) =

South Korean volleyball player (born 1962)

Personal information
- Nationality: South Korean
- Born: 19 January 1962 (age 63)

Sport
- Sport: Volleyball

Lee Jong-kyung (Korean: 이종경; Hanja: 李種敬; RR: I Jonggyeong, born 19 January 1962) is a South Korean volleyball player. He competed at the 1984 Summer Olympics and the 1988 Summer Olympics.
