= Nripjit Singh Bedi =

Indian volleyball player and coach

Nripjit Singh Bedi (commonly known as "Nippy", born 1 June 1940) was a volleyball player who was a member of the Indian national team and competed in the silver medal-winning effort at the 4th Asian Games. Bedi received the Arjuna Award from the Government of India in 1962. The Indian athlete's volleyball career lasted for 23 years. He served as a Commandant with the Border Security Force (BSF) of Punjab before his 1995 retirement.

== Early life ==
Bedi was born in Dhariwal in the Gurdaspur district of Punjab, India. He was the youngest of 6 siblings. He started playing at an early age of 9 when he used to watch others play in the fields at Dhariwal. He would watch the older players and picked up on the technique and tailored it into his unique style. He played for his school and college team. He played his first all India tournament match at Roorkee and Shahjhanpur Tata Nagar in 1956 at the age of 16 years.

He was given the name 'Nippy' because he was very quick on his feet.

== Player ==
Bedi played volleyball with Punjab University from 1956 to 1958 including 59 international test matches against opponents such as Romania, Poland, Czechoslovakia, Russia (3 times), Japan, South Korea, North Korea, the Philippines, Israel, Indonesia, France, Sri Lanka and Pakistan (1959 to 1974).

Bedi set a record for durability playing for Punjab State, Punjab Police and the BSF teams for 21 years (1959 to 1979) in total.

=== Highlights ===
At 5ft 10 inches, Bedi's height was not that of a typical attacker or smasher of the ball who averaged above 6ft. Bedi started as a lifter but developed into a smasher and lifter. He worked hard at his technique, his physical ability and was very particular about his diet. Bedi would practice on his jump to spike the ball. He could reach the height of 11ft 4inches, neck-high above the net. He is the only spiker in Indian Volleyball who was able to turn his body in the air and spike the ball.

Bedi competed at the 4th Asian Games in Jakarta (1962) where the Indian national volleyball squad won the silver medal. There are many highlights from the championships, mainly the highly contested match semi final between India and Pakistan, which was a 5 set match. And India won it to face Japan in the finals. This is the highest medal won till date in the history of Indian Volleyball.

Bedi also represented India at the Asian Games in Bangkok (1966)). In Pre Olympic qualifying championships, the Indian team won a bronze medal in Delhi (1963), prior to the Tokyo Olympics held in the latter half of 1964.

Bedi is the youngest recipient of the Arjuna Award in 1962 and is the first awardee from Punjab state. He was also the first ever member of the Punjab Police and BSF to be a recipient for achievements in volleyball. Over a decade later, Bedi was declared "Sportsman of the Year" by the Punjab government in 1974.

Under Bedi's leadership and captainship, the BSF was undefeated from 1968 to 1979 in National championships; All Indian Police Games and in open All India tournaments/championships in all over India.

Bedi holds the record of playing the most all India Nationals from 1958 to 1979 continuously. He won 13 Gold medals, 5 Silver medals and 1 Bronze medal at nationals. In 1965 the Nationals did not take place due to the war between India and Pakistan.

He served as a Commandant with the Border Security Force (BSF) before his retirement in 1995. His command took him all over India like Jammu Kashmir - Mendher, West Bengal - Raiganj, Malda, Rajasthan, Gujarat - Rann of Kutch, Punjab - Dera Baba Nanak, Fazilka.

Bedi was the recipient of the President's Police Medal for meritorious service in 1992 and with a Lifetime Achievement Award by the Punjab police, the latter given by the chief minister of Punjab in 2007. Punjab Government honoured Bedi for his outstanding contributions towards Volleyball as part of the 550th birth celebration of Guru Nanak Dev ji in 2019.

Melville de Melo, India's most legendary Anglo Indian sports broadcaster and author, said "INDIA has produced only one NIPPY and there cannot be another NIPPY."

== Coach ==
Bedi was the coach of the BSF Volleyball team along with its captain. Bedi was appointed coach for the Indian volleyball team and led them to the 1983 Asian Men's Volleyball Championship in Japan. He coached the Indian police team in 1967, 1974 and 1983 and filled the same position with the BSF team for a period of 15 years.

Bedi trained many players who represented India, including Balwant Singh "Ballu". Bedi was a member of the Sports Council of India, a Sports Authority of India (SAI) selector and president of the DVA.

== Retirement ==
Following his retirement Bedi lives in Jalandhar. He is still involved in providing free coaching to young players, and attends coaching camps.

== Awards ==
=== Individuals ===
- 1962 Arjuna Award
- 1974 Sportsman of the Year; Punjab Government
- 1992 President's Police Medal for Meritorious Services (Border Security Force)
- 2007 Lifetime Achievement Award by Punjab Police
- 2019 Honoured by Government of Punjab on the 550th Birth Anniversary of Guru Nanak Dev ji.
