= Teruhisa Moriyama =

Japanese volleyball player (born 1942)

Personal information
- Born: 17 March 1936 (age 90)
- Height: 187 cm (6 ft 2 in)
- Weight: 181 lb (82 kg; 12 st 13 lb)
Medal record
Men's volleyball
Representing Japan
Olympic Games
Bronze medal – third place	1964 Tokyo	Team competition

Teruhisa Moriyama (森山 輝久, Moriyama Teruhisa; born March 17, 1942), born in the Hiroshima Prefecture, is a Japanese former volleyball player who competed in the 1964 Summer Olympics as a member of Japan's bronze medal team. He played in all nine matches, scoring 57 individual points.
