= Chang Byung-chul =

South Korean volleyball player (born 1976)

Personal information
- Nationality: South Korean
- Born: 15 August 1976 (age 49)

Sport
- Sport: Volleyball

Chang Byung-chul (born 15 August 1976) is a South Korean volleyball player. He competed in the men's tournament at the 2000 Summer Olympics.
