= Ji Liping (volleyball) =

Chinese volleyball player (born 1968)

Personal information
- Nationality: Chinese
- Born: 29 November 1968 (age 57)
- Height: 180 cm (5 ft 11 in)

Career
Years	Teams
1994	Sichuan

National team
1994	China

Ji Liping (born 29 November 1968) is a retired Chinese female volleyball player.

She was part of the China women's national volleyball team at the 1994 FIVB Volleyball Women's World Championship in Brazil. At club level she played with Sichuan.

== Clubs ==
- (China) Sichuan (1994)
