= Suk Jin-wook =

South Korean volleyball player (born 1976)

Personal information
- Full name: Suk Jin-wook
- Nationality: South Korean
- Born: December 5, 1976 (age 49); Incheon, South Korea
- Height: 1.86 m (6 ft 1 in)

Volleyball information
- Position: Outside hitter

Career
Years	Teams
1999–2013	(South Korea) Samsung Fire Bluefangs

National team
1999–2010	South Korea
Honours
Representing South Korea
Men's volleyball
Asian Games
Gold medal – first place	2002 Busan	Team
Bronze medal – third place	2010 Guangzhou	Team
- Last updated: March 3, 2015

Suk Jin-wook (Korean: 석진욱; born December 5, 1976) is a retired volleyball player from South Korea, who played as an outside hitter for the South Korean men's national team. He was named Best Receiver at the 2008 Olympic Qualification Tournament, where South Korea ended up in third place and missed qualification for the 2008 Summer Olympics in Beijing, PR China. Although he was technically an outside hitter, Suk showed exceptional defensive skills in playing with a libero player in the back row - as an outside hitter he was often named Best Receiver in domestic and international competitions.

Suk is currently the assistant coach with the Ansan OK Savings Bank in V-League.

== Honours ==
- 2002 Asian Games — Gold Medal
- 2003 FIVB World Cup — 6th place
- 2003 Asian Volleyball Championship — Gold Medal, Best Receiver
- 2008 Olympic Qualification Tournament — Best Receiver
- 2010 Asian Games — Bronze Medal
