= Lim Tae-ho =

South Korean volleyball player (born 1940)

Personal information
- Nationality: South Korean
- Born: 12 December 1940 (age 84)

Sport
- Sport: Volleyball

Lim Tae-ho (born 12 December 1940) is a South Korean volleyball player. He competed in the men's tournament at the 1964 Summer Olympics.
