= Lee Kyung-Soo (volleyball) =

South Korean volleyball player (born 1979)

Lee Gyeong-su
Personal information
- Nationality: South Korean
- Born: 27 April 1979 (age 47)

Sport
- Sport: Volleyball

Lee Gyeong-su (born 27 April 1979) is a South Korean volleyball player. He competed in the men's tournament at the 2000 Summer Olympics.
