= Park Jong-chan (volleyball) =

South Korean volleyball player (born 1970)

Personal information
- Nationality: South Korean
- Born: 15 January 1970 (age 55)

Sport
- Sport: Volleyball

Park Jong-chan (born 15 January 1970) is a South Korean volleyball player. He competed in the men's tournament at the 1992 Summer Olympics.
