= Lee Ju-hyeong =

South Korean hammer thrower

Personal information
- Nationality: South Korean
- Born: 4 January 1965 (age 61)

Sport
- Sport: Athletics
- Event: Hammer throw

Lee Ju-hyeong (born 4 January 1965) is a South Korean athlete. He competed in the men's hammer throw at the 1988 Summer Olympics.
