= Kim Man-su (baseball) =

South Korean baseball player (born 1996)

KT Wiz – No. 44
- Catcher
- Born: April 18, 1996 (age 29); South Korea
- Bats: Right Throws: Right

KBO debut
- 2015, for the KT Wiz

- Kim Man-su
- Hangul: 김만수
- RR: Gim Mansu
- MR: Kim Mansu

Kim Man-su (Korean: 김만수; born April 18, 1996) is the catcher of KT Wiz of the KBO League. He graduated from Hyocheon High school.
