= Suh Choon-kang =

South Korean volleyball player (born 1944)

Personal information
- Nationality: South Korean
- Born: 21 February 1944 (age 81)

Sport
- Sport: Volleyball

Suh Choon-kang (born 21 February 1944) is a South Korean volleyball player. She competed in the women's tournament at the 1964 Summer Olympics.
