= Oh Yon-kyung =

South Korean volleyball player (born 1971)

Oh Yoon-kyung

Personal information
- Nationality: South Korean
- Born: 5 November 1971 (age 54)
- Height: 1.74 m (5 ft 9 in)

Volleyball information
- Number: 12 (national team)

Career
Years	Teams
1994	Honam Oil

National team
1994	South Korea

- Oh Yon-kyung
- Hangul: 오윤경
- RR: O Yungyeong
- MR: O Yun'gyŏng

Oh Yoon-kyung (born 5 November 1971) is a retired South Korean female volleyball player. She was part of the South Korea women's national volleyball team.

She participated in the 1994 FIVB Volleyball Women's World Championship. She attended Geunyeong Girls' High School (전주근영여자고등학교) in Jeonju, and went on to play for Honam Oil at the club level.

== Clubs ==
- Honam Oil (1994)
