= Yasutaka Sato =

Japanese volleyball player (born 1940)

Olympic medal record

Men's Volleyball
| Bronze medal – third place | 1964 Tokyo | Team |

Yasutaka Sato (佐藤 安孝, Satō Yasutaka; born February 3, 1940) is a Japanese former volleyball player who competed in the 1964 Summer Olympics.

In 1964, he was part of the Japanese team, which won the bronze medal in the Olympic tournament. He played all nine matches.
