= Ryoo Choon-ja =

South Korean volleyball player (born 1945)

Personal information
- Nationality: South Korean
- Born: 3 June 1945 (age 80)

Sport
- Sport: Volleyball

Ryoo Choon-ja (born 3 June 1945) is a South Korean volleyball player. She competed in the women's tournament at the 1964 Summer Olympics.
