= Kim Nam-soon (volleyball) =

South Korean volleyball player (born 1970)

Personal information
- Nationality: South Korean
- Born: 25 July 1970 (age 55)

Sport
- Sport: Volleyball

Kim Nam-soon (born 25 July 1970) is a South Korean volleyball player who competed in the women's tournament at the 1996 Summer Olympics.
