= Yutaka Demachi =

Japanese volleyball player (born 1935)

Personal information
- Born: 17 February 1935 (age 91) Japan
Medal record
Men's volleyball
Representing Japan
Olympic Games
Bronze medal – third place	1964 Tokyo	Team competition

Yutaka Demachi (出町 豊, Demachi Yutaka; born February 17, 1935) is a retired Japanese volleyball player. He was a member of the Japanese Men's National Volleyball Team that claimed the bronze medal at the 1964 Summer Olympics in Tokyo, Japan.
