= Son Young-wan =

South Korean volleyball player

Personal information
- Nationality: South Korean
- Born: 4 March 1934 (age 91)

Sport
- Sport: Volleyball

Son Young-wan (born 4 March 1934) is a South Korean volleyball player. He competed in the men's tournament at the 1964 Summer Olympics.
