= Tsutomu Koyama =

Japanese volleyball player (1936–2012)

Personal information
- Born: 26 July 1936 Sakaide, Kagawa, Japan
- Died: 2 July 2012 (aged 75)
Medal record
Men's volleyball
Representing Japan
Olympic Games
Bronze medal – third place	1964 Tokyo	Team competition

Tsutomu Koyama (小山 勉, Koyama Tsutomu) (July 26, 1936 – July 2, 2012) was a Japanese volleyball player. He was a member of the Men's National Volleyball Team that claimed the bronze medal at the 1964 Summer Olympics in Tokyo, Japan. He later served as the head coach of the Men's National Team.

Koyama died on July 2, 2012, of esophageal cancer, aged 75.
