= Kim Jin-hee (volleyball) =

South Korean volleyball player (born 1940)

Personal information
- Nationality: South Korean
- Born: 1 March 1940 (age 85)

Sport
- Sport: Volleyball

Kim Jin-hee (born 1 March 1940) is a South Korean volleyball player. He competed in the men's tournament at the 1964 Summer Olympics.
