= Kim Kyung-hee (volleyball) =

South Korean volleyball player (born 1966)

Personal information
- Nationality: South Korean
- Born: 25 February 1966 (age 60)

Sport
- Sport: Volleyball

- Kim Kyung-hee
- Hangul: 김경희
- Hanja: 金慶熙
- RR: Gim Gyeonghui
- MR: Kim Kyŏnghŭi

Kim Kyung-hee (born 25 February 1966) is a South Korean volleyball player. She competed in the women's tournament at the 1988 Summer Olympics.
