= Volleyball at the 1990 Asian Games – Men's tournament =

Men at the 1990 Asian Games
- Venue: Chaoyang Gymnasium
- Date: 23 September – 5 October 1990
- Nations: 9

Medalists
gold medal	China
silver medal	South Korea
bronze medal	Japan

The men's volleyball tournament at the 1990 Asian Games was held from September 23 to October 5, 1990 in Beijing, China.

== Results ==
=== Preliminary round ===
==== Pool A ====
Pos	Team	Pld	W	L	Pts	SW	SL	SR	SPW	SPL	SPR	Qualification
1	China	4	4	0	8	12	0	MAX	180	61	2.951	Semifinals
2	North Korea	4	3	1	7	9	3	3.000	158	130	1.215	Semifinals
3	Pakistan	4	2	2	6	6	6	1.000	134	138	0.971	Classification 5th–8th
4	Saudi Arabia	4	1	3	5	3	9	0.333	117	165	0.709	Classification 5th–8th
5	Myanmar	4	0	4	4	0	12	0.000	85	180	0.472	

Source: Results

Date		Score		Set 1	Set 2	Set 3	Set 4	Set 5	Total
23 Sep	Myanmar	0–3	Saudi Arabia	8–15	12–15	9–15			29–45
23 Sep	North Korea	3–0	Pakistan	15–12	15–11	15–12			45–35
24 Sep	Pakistan	3–0	Myanmar	15–7	15–9	15–12			45–28
24 Sep	China	3–0	North Korea	15–6	15–8	15–8			45–22
26 Sep	Saudi Arabia	0–3	Pakistan	8–15	8–15	4–15			20–45
26 Sep	Myanmar	0–3	China	8–15	1–15	6–15			15–45
28 Sep	North Korea	3–0	Myanmar	15–1	15–8	15–4			45–13
28 Sep	China	3–0	Saudi Arabia	15–6	15–6	15–3			45–15
30 Sep	Saudi Arabia	0–3	North Korea	10–15	14–16	13–15			37–46
30 Sep	Pakistan	0–3	China	1–15	3–15	5–15			9–45

==== Pool B ====
Pos	Team	Pld	W	L	Pts	SW	SL	SR	SPW	SPL	SPR	Qualification
1	South Korea	3	3	0	6	9	0	MAX	137	63	2.175	Semifinals
2	Japan	3	2	1	5	6	3	2.000	128	52	2.462	Semifinals
3	Vietnam	3	1	2	4	3	6	0.500	62	104	0.596	Classification 5th–8th
4	Hong Kong	3	0	3	3	0	9	0.000	27	135	0.200	Classification 5th–8th

Source: Results

Date		Score		Set 1	Set 2	Set 3	Set 4	Set 5	Total
23 Sep	Hong Kong	0–3	Vietnam	2–15	7–15	5–15			14–45
24 Sep	South Korea	3–0	Japan	16–14	16–14	15–10			47–38
26 Sep	Hong Kong	0–3	South Korea	3–15	3–15	5–15			11–45
28 Sep	Japan	3–0	Hong Kong	15–1	15–0	15–1			45–2
28 Sep	South Korea	3–0	Vietnam	15–3	15–8	15–3			45–14
30 Sep	Vietnam	0–3	Japan	0–15	2–15	1–15			3–45

=== Classification 5th–8th ===
Semifinals
2 October
Pakistan	3
Hong Kong	0
2 October
Vietnam	0
Saudi Arabia	3

Classification 5th–6th
4 October
Pakistan	3
Saudi Arabia	2
Classification 7th–8th
4 October
Hong Kong	1
Vietnam	3

==== Semifinals ====
Date		Score		Set 1	Set 2	Set 3	Set 4	Set 5	Total
02 Oct	Pakistan	3–0	Hong Kong	15–2	15–9	15–5			45–16
02 Oct	Vietnam	0–3	Saudi Arabia	10–15	11–15	12–15			33–45

==== Classification 7th–8th ====
Date		Score		Set 1	Set 2	Set 3	Set 4	Set 5	Total
04 Oct	Hong Kong	1–3	Vietnam	15–7	9–15	5–15	7–15		36–52

==== Classification 5th–6th ====
Date		Score		Set 1	Set 2	Set 3	Set 4	Set 5	Total
04 Oct	Pakistan	3–2	Saudi Arabia	15–12	10–15	9–15	15–9	15–12	64–63

=== Final round ===
Semifinals
2 October
China	3
Japan	2
2 October
South Korea	3
North Korea	0

Gold medal match
5 October
China	3
South Korea	1
Bronze medal match
4 October
Japan	3
North Korea	0

==== Semifinals ====
Date		Score		Set 1	Set 2	Set 3	Set 4	Set 5	Total
02 Oct	China	3–2	Japan	15–10	13–15	16–14	4–15	15–13	63–67
02 Oct	South Korea	3–0	North Korea	15–10	15–7	15–8			45–25

==== Bronze medal match ====
Date		Score		Set 1	Set 2	Set 3	Set 4	Set 5	Total
04 Oct	Japan	3–0	North Korea	15–10	15–9	15–8			45–27

==== Gold medal match ====
Date		Score		Set 1	Set 2	Set 3	Set 4	Set 5	Total
05 Oct	China	3–1	South Korea	15–8	14–16	15–9	15–11		59–44

== Final standing ==
Rank	Team	Pld	W	L
1st place, gold medalist(s)	China	6	6	0
2nd place, silver medalist(s)	South Korea	5	4	1
3rd place, bronze medalist(s)	Japan	5	3	2
4	North Korea	6	3	3
5	Pakistan	6	4	2
6	Saudi Arabia	6	2	4
7	Vietnam	5	2	3
8	Hong Kong	5	0	5
9	Myanmar	4	0	4
