= Volleyball at the 1994 Asian Games – Men's tournament =

Men at the 1994 Asian Games
- Venue: Green Arena
- Date: 3–16 October 1994
- Nations: 7

Medalists
gold medal	Japan
silver medal	China
bronze medal	South Korea

The men's volleyball tournament at the 1994 Asian Games was held from October 3 to October 16, 1994 in Hiroshima, Japan.

Due to scheduling conflicts with 1994 FIVB Volleyball Men's World Championship, China, Japan and South Korea qualified directly to the second round.

== Results ==
All times are Japan Standard Time (UTC+09:00)

=== First round ===
Pos	Team	Pld	W	L	Pts	SW	SL	SR	SPW	SPL	SPR	Qualification
1	Kazakhstan	6	6	0	12	18	0	MAX	273	122	2.238	Second round
2	Iran	6	4	2	10	12	10	1.200	277	246	1.126	Second round
3	Pakistan	6	2	4	8	10	12	0.833	258	247	1.045	Second round
4	Mongolia	6	0	6	6	0	18	0.000	77	270	0.285	Second round

Source: Results

Date	Time		Score		Set 1	Set 2	Set 3	Set 4	Set 5	Total
03 Oct	14:00	Pakistan	2–3	Iran	15–9	16–14	7–15	6–15	13–15	57–68
03 Oct	16:00	Kazakhstan	3–0	Mongolia	15–2	15–5	15–5			45–12
04 Oct	14:00	Iran	3–0	Mongolia	15–0	15–5	15–3			45–8
04 Oct	16:00	Pakistan	0–3	Kazakhstan	9–15	4–15	8–15			21–45
06 Oct	14:00	Mongolia	0–3	Pakistan	4–15	2–15	1–15			7–45
06 Oct	16:00	Kazakhstan	3–0	Iran	15–7	15–6	17–15			47–28
07 Oct	14:00	Pakistan	2–3	Iran	15–17	15–9	15–13	8–15	10–15	63–69
07 Oct	16:00	Kazakhstan	3–0	Mongolia	15–2	15–1	15–9			45–12
09 Oct	14:00	Iran	3–0	Mongolia	15–13	15–6	15–7			45–26
09 Oct	16:00	Pakistan	0–3	Kazakhstan	2–15	11–15	14–16			27–46
10 Oct	14:00	Mongolia	0–3	Pakistan	5–15	3–15	4–15			12–45
10 Oct	16:00	Kazakhstan	3–0	Iran	15–8	15–8	15–6			45–22

=== Second round ===
==== Pool A ====
Pos	Team	Pld	W	L	Pts	SW	SL	SR	SPW	SPL	SPR	Qualification
1	South Korea	2	2	0	4	6	0	MAX	90	31	2.903	Semifinals
2	Kazakhstan	2	1	1	3	3	4	0.750	76	81	0.938	Semifinals
3	Iran	2	0	2	2	1	6	0.167	48	102	0.471	5th place match

Source: Results

Date	Time		Score		Set 1	Set 2	Set 3	Set 4	Set 5	Total
11 Oct	14:00	Iran	1–3	Kazakhstan	15–12	9–15	7–15	5–15		36–57
12 Oct	14:00	South Korea	3–0	Iran	15–3	15–6	15–3			45–12
13 Oct	16:00	Kazakhstan	0–3	South Korea	8–15	3–15	8–15			19–45

==== Pool B ====
Pos	Team	Pld	W	L	Pts	SW	SL	SR	SPW	SPL	SPR	Qualification
1	China	3	3	0	6	9	1	9.000	145	71	2.042	Semifinals
2	Japan	3	2	1	5	7	3	2.333	136	70	1.943	Semifinals
3	Pakistan	3	1	2	4	3	6	0.500	71	100	0.710	5th place match
4	Mongolia	3	0	3	3	0	9	0.000	24	135	0.178	

Source: Results

Date	Time		Score		Set 1	Set 2	Set 3	Set 4	Set 5	Total
11 Oct	16:00	Japan	3–0	Pakistan	15–2	15–3	15–4			45–9
11 Oct	18:00	China	3–0	Mongolia	15–1	15–2	15–5			45–8
12 Oct	16:00	Mongolia	0–3	Pakistan	5–15	1–15	4–15			10–45
12 Oct	18:00	China	3–1	Japan	15–9	15–10	10–15	15–12		55–46
13 Oct	14:00	Pakistan	0–3	China	12–15	2–15	3–15			17–45
13 Oct	18:00	Japan	3–0	Mongolia	15–3	15–1	15–2			45–6

=== 5th place match ===
Date	Time		Score		Set 1	Set 2	Set 3	Set 4	Set 5	Total
15 Oct	14:00	Iran	3–0	Pakistan	15–12	15–8	15–2			45–22

=== Final round ===
Semifinals
15 October
South Korea	0
Japan	3
15 October
China	3
Kazakhstan	0

Final
16 October
Japan	3
China	2
Bronze medal match
16 October
South Korea	3
Kazakhstan	0

==== Semifinals ====
Date	Time		Score		Set 1	Set 2	Set 3	Set 4	Set 5	Total
15 Oct	16:00	South Korea	0–3	Japan	7–15	11–15	5–15			23–45
15 Oct	18:00	China	3–0	Kazakhstan	15–4	15–7	15–7			45–18

==== Bronze medal match ====
Date	Time		Score		Set 1	Set 2	Set 3	Set 4	Set 5	Total
16 Oct	10:00	South Korea	3–0	Kazakhstan	15–2	15–8	15–10			45–20

==== Final ====
Date	Time		Score		Set 1	Set 2	Set 3	Set 4	Set 5	Total
16 Oct	12:00	Japan	3–2	China	12–15	13–15	15–13	15–2	15–10	70–55

== Final standing ==
Rank	Team	Pld	W	L
1st place, gold medalist(s)	Japan	5	4	1
2nd place, silver medalist(s)	China	5	4	1
3rd place, bronze medalist(s)	South Korea	4	3	1
4	Kazakhstan	10	7	3
5	Iran	9	5	4
6	Pakistan	10	3	7
7	Mongolia	9	0	9
