= Volleyball at the 1994 Asian Games – Women's tournament =

Women at the 1994 Asian Games
- Venue: Green Arena
- Date: 3–7 October 1994
- Nations: 6

Medalists
gold medal	South Korea
silver medal	China
bronze medal	Japan

The women's volleyball tournament at the 1994 Asian Games was held from October 3 to October 7, 1994 in Hiroshima, Japan.

== Results ==
All times are Japan Standard Time (UTC+09:00)

Pos	Team	Pld	W	L	Pts	SW	SL	SR	SPW	SPL	SPR
1	South Korea	5	5	0	10	15	4	3.750	278	145	1.917
2	China	5	4	1	9	14	5	2.800	270	167	1.617
3	Japan	5	3	2	8	13	6	2.167	246	156	1.577
4	Chinese Taipei	5	2	3	7	6	9	0.667	138	166	0.831
5	Thailand	5	1	4	6	3	12	0.250	90	194	0.464
6	Mongolia	5	0	5	5	0	15	0.000	31	225	0.138

Source: Results

Date	Time		Score		Set 1	Set 2	Set 3	Set 4	Set 5	Total
03 Oct	14:00	Mongolia	0–3	China	2–15	2–15	1–15			5–45
03 Oct	16:00	Chinese Taipei	0–3	Japan	7–15	3–15	0–15			10–45
03 Oct	18:00	South Korea	3–0	Thailand	15–1	15–0	15–4			45–5
04 Oct	14:00	Chinese Taipei	3–0	Thailand	15–6	15–7	15–10			45–23
04 Oct	16:00	Japan	3–0	Mongolia	15–0	15–0	15–1			45–1
04 Oct	18:00	South Korea	3–2	China	12–15	15–7	15–13	9–15	21–19	72–69
05 Oct	14:00	South Korea	3–0	Mongolia	15–0	15–3	15–0			45–3
05 Oct	16:00	Japan	3–0	Thailand	15–1	15–3	15–4			45–8
05 Oct	18:00	China	3–0	Chinese Taipei	15–9	15–9	15–6			45–24
06 Oct	14:00	Thailand	0–3	China	2–15	1–15	6–15			9–45
06 Oct	16:00	Chinese Taipei	3–0	Mongolia	15–5	15–0	15–3			45–8
06 Oct	18:00	Japan	2–3	South Korea	15–13	15–13	3–15	10–15	11–15	54–71
07 Oct	14:00	Mongolia	0–3	Thailand	4–15	10–15	0–15			14–45
07 Oct	16:00	South Korea	3–0	Chinese Taipei	15–1	15–11	15–2			45–14
07 Oct	18:00	Japan	2–3	China	11–15	5–15	15–11	15–10	11–15	57–66

== Final standing ==
Rank	Team	Pld	W	L
1st place, gold medalist(s)	South Korea	5	5	0
2nd place, silver medalist(s)	China	5	4	1
3rd place, bronze medalist(s)	Japan	5	3	2
4	Chinese Taipei	5	2	3
5	Thailand	5	1	4
6	Mongolia	5	0	5
