= Volleyball at the 1990 Asian Games – Women's tournament =

Women at the 1990 Asian Games
- Venue: Chaoyang Gymnasium
- Date: 25 September – 5 October 1990
- Nations: 6

Medalists
| gold medal | China |
| silver medal | South Korea |
| bronze medal | Japan |

The women's volleyball tournament at the 1990 Asian Games was held from September 25 to October 5, 1990 in Beijing, China.

== Results ==
| Pos | Team | Pld | W | L | Pts | SW | SL | SR | SPW | SPL | SPR |
|---|---|---|---|---|---|---|---|---|---|---|---|
| 1 | China | 5 | 5 | 0 | 10 | 15 | 1 | 15.000 | 236 | 86 | 2.744 |
| 2 | South Korea | 5 | 4 | 1 | 9 | 13 | 3 | 4.333 | 212 | 141 | 1.504 |
| 3 | Japan | 5 | 3 | 2 | 8 | 9 | 7 | 1.286 | 185 | 155 | 1.194 |
| 4 | North Korea | 5 | 2 | 3 | 7 | 7 | 10 | 0.700 | 189 | 210 | 0.900 |
| 5 | Chinese Taipei | 5 | 1 | 4 | 6 | 4 | 12 | 0.333 | 143 | 206 | 0.694 |
| 6 | Thailand | 5 | 0 | 5 | 5 | 0 | 15 | 0.000 | 58 | 225 | 0.258 |

Source: Results

| Date | | Score | | Set 1 | Set 2 | Set 3 | Set 4 | Set 5 | Total |
|---|---|---|---|---|---|---|---|---|---|
| 25 Sep | Thailand | 0–3 | South Korea | 1–15 | 9–15 | 2–15 | | | 12–45 |
| 25 Sep | China | 3–0 | Chinese Taipei | 15–10 | 15–6 | 15–3 | | | 45–19 |
| 25 Sep | Japan | 3–1 | North Korea | 15–11 | 15–10 | 11–15 | 15–12 | | 56–48 |
| 27 Sep | Chinese Taipei | 1–3 | North Korea | 10–15 | 11–15 | 15–8 | 12–15 | | 49–53 |
| 27 Sep | China | 3–0 | Thailand | 15–2 | 15–3 | 15–2 | | | 45–7 |
| 27 Sep | South Korea | 3–0 | Japan | 15–5 | 15–10 | 15–11 | | | 45–26 |
| 01 Oct | North Korea | 0–3 | South Korea | 9–15 | 12–15 | 7–15 | | | 28–45 |
| 01 Oct | Thailand | 0–3 | Chinese Taipei | 7–15 | 2–15 | 9–15 | | | 18–45 |
| 01 Oct | Japan | 0–3 | China | 1–15 | 6–15 | 6–15 | | | 13–45 |
| 03 Oct | Thailand | 0–3 | Japan | 3–15 | 2–15 | 1–15 | | | 6–45 |
| 03 Oct | Chinese Taipei | 0–3 | South Korea | 6–15 | 4–15 | 9–15 | | | 19–45 |
| 03 Oct | China | 3–0 | North Korea | 15–7 | 15–2 | 15–6 | | | 45–15 |
| 05 Oct | South Korea | 1–3 | China | 15–11 | 5–15 | 3–15 | 9–15 | | 32–56 |
| 05 Oct | Japan | 3–0 | Chinese Taipei | 15–6 | 15–2 | 15–3 | | | 45–11 |
| 05 Oct | North Korea | 3–0 | Thailand | 15–6 | 15–1 | 15–8 | | | 45–15 |

== Final standing ==
| Rank | Team | Pld | W | L |
|---|---|---|---|---|
| 1st place, gold medalist(s) | China | 5 | 5 | 0 |
| 2nd place, silver medalist(s) | South Korea | 5 | 4 | 1 |
| 3rd place, bronze medalist(s) | Japan | 5 | 3 | 2 |
| 4 | North Korea | 5 | 2 | 3 |
| 5 | Chinese Taipei | 5 | 1 | 4 |
| 6 | Thailand | 5 | 0 | 5 |
