= Leap (film) =

2020 Chinese drama film

- Theatrical release poster

Chinese name
- Traditional Chinese: 奪冠
- Simplified Chinese: 夺冠
- Literal meaning: to take first prize
Transcriptions
Standard Mandarin
- Hanyu Pinyin: Duóguàn
- Directed by: Peter Chan
- Written by: Zhang Ji
- Produced by: Zhang Yibai; Jojo Hui
- Starring: Gong Li; Huang Bo; Wu Gang
- Cinematography: Zhao Xiaoshi
- Edited by: Zhang Yibo
- Music by: Shigeru Umebayashi; Lincoln Lo
- Production companies: We Pictures; China Film Group; Huaxia Film Distribution; Alibaba Pictures
- Distributed by: We Pictures
- Release date: September 25, 2020
- Running time: 135 minutes
- Country: China
- Language: Mandarin
- Box office: $129 million

Leap (Chinese: 夺冠) is a 2020 Chinese biographical sports drama film directed by Peter Chan and starring Gong Li and Huang Bo. The film is based on the China women's national volleyball team's stories spread over more than 40 years. The film was released in mainland China and the United States on September 25, 2020. It had been slated for release in China on January 25, 2020, the first day of the Chinese New Year, but was withdrawn due to the COVID-19 pandemic.

The film's Chinese title was originally named "China Women's Volleyball Team" ("Zhong Guo Nu Pai") but due to regulatory issues, was renamed as Duoguan ("to take the crown") one day before pre-release sales started. Leap is the Chinese entry for the Best International Feature Film at the 93rd Academy Awards, but it was not nominated.

== Cast ==
- Gong Li as Coach Lang Ping
  - Lydia Bai as Young Lang Ping
- Huang Bo as Chen Zhonghe
  - Peng Yuchang as Young Chen Zhonghe
- Wu Gang as Yuan Weimin

Lang Ping the player is played by her real-life daughter Lydia Bai (Chinese name: Bai Lang), a former Stanford Cardinal player. Lydia Bai herself is played by Audrey Hui (Joan Chen's daughter) in the film.

=== 2013–16 Chinese national team ===
- Zhu Ting as herself
- Xu Yunli as herself
- Hui Ruoqi as herself
- Yuan Xinyue as herself
- Yan Ni as herself
- Gong Xiangyu as herself
- Ding Xia as herself
- Lin Li as herself
- Zhang Changning as herself
- Liu Xiaotong as herself
- Yao Di as Wei Qiuyue
- Zeng Chunlei
- Liu Yanhan
- Zheng Yixin
- Wang Mengjie
- Wang Yuanyuan
- Yang Hanyu
- Wang Lujia as the player who quit

The cast consists of ten out of the twelve Olympic Gold medalists from the 2016 Rio Olympics squad appearing as themselves. As Wei Qiuyue was pregnant at the time of filming, Yao Di (who was cut before the Olympics) was cast to act as Wei. (Despite Wei's absence, her husband Yuan Lingxi, who has been an assistant coach on the team, appears in the film as himself.)

=== 1980s Chinese national team ===
- Lydia Bai as Lang Ping
- Li Dongxu as Chen Zhaodi
  - Liu Mintao as Old Chen Zhaodi
- Chen Zhan as Sun Jinfang
- Luo Hui as Zhou Xiaolan
- Ling Min as Zhou Lumin
- Ma Xuechun as Zhang Rongfang
- Liu Chang as Yang Xi
- Liu Chenxi as Zhang Jieyun
- Li Ziwei as Chen Yaqiong
- Mao Wen as Cao Huiying
- Liu Zhenhong as Liang Yan
- Li Yangyi as Zhu Ling

=== Others ===
- Kaori Kodaira as Miyoko Hirose
- Hitomi Nakamichi
- Logan Tom as herself
- Halle Johnson as Flo Hyman
- Jarasporn Bundasak
- Sutadta Chuewulim
- Anongporn Promrat
- Tapaphaipun Chaisri
- Jaqueline Carvalho as herself
- Marianne Steinbrecher
- Juliana Nogueira
- Paula Pequeno
- Bárbara Kozonoe
- Alexandre Rivetti de Azevedo as José Roberto Guimarães
- Liu Tao as Feng Kun
- Zhao Chenlu as Wang Yimei
- Li Shan as Lai Yawen
- Li Xian (special appearance)
- Zhang Hanyan as Lang Ping's mother
- Audrey Hui as Lang Ping's daughter

== Production ==
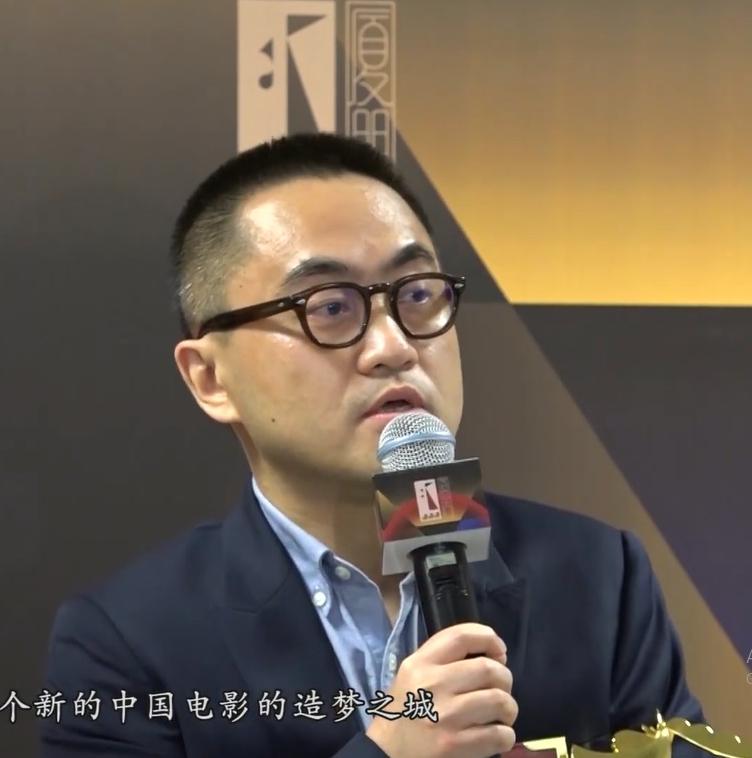
Zhang Ji wrote the screenplay for Leap, which later earned him Best Writing at the 33rd Golden Rooster Awards.

Hong Kong American director Peter Chan was signed to direct the film. Gong Li plays the female lead, Lang Ping, the current head coach of the China women's national volleyball team. Filming began on April 16, 2019, and wrapped up in August 2019.

== Soundtrack ==
The theme song "River of Life" (生命之河) is a duet by Faye Wong and Na Ying, and produced by Zhang Yadong.

The promotion song "Day and Night" (不分昼夜) is sung by Jackson Yee, and produced by Radio Mars

=== Instrumental music ===
| No. | Title | Length |
|---|---|---|
| 1. | "Leap (中国女排登场)" |
| 2. | "Facing the Wall, Attacking the Wall (备战世界杯)" |
| 3. | "New Year's Dinner (年夜饭)" |
| 4. | "Get Up! Watch the Ball (千锤百炼)" |
| 5. | "Tomorrow We Can Win (我们会赢的！)" |
| 6. | "1980, Beijing (北京1980)" |
| 7. | "1981 World Cup, China vs. Japan (中国 vs. 日本)" |
| 8. | "All for the Day (一切只为今天)" |
| 9. | "Believe in the Future (相信未来)" |
| 10. | "Jumping Up One After Another (一鼓作气)" |
| 11. | "2008 China vs. USA (中国 vs. 美国)" |
| 12. | "My Daughter My Lucky Charm (女儿，我的幸运星)" |
| 13. | "The Funeral (You Never Stopped Fighting) (别掉队，都跟上)" |
| 14. | "Back to China (回来吧！)" |
| 15. | "Be Wrapped in Confusion (新旧磨合)" |
| 16. | "Long Table Meeting (迎来的改变)" |
| 17. | "No One Will Be Here Again (这就是我们)" |
| 18. | "Truthful Words (打出自己的排球)" |
| 19. | "2016 China vs. Brazil (中国 vs. 巴西)" |
| 20. | "Rio, Quarter Final (里约赛点)" |
| 21. | "In the Moment of Victory (夺冠时刻)" |
| 22. | "Leap Reprise (中国女排的荣耀)" |

== Release ==
Leap was scheduled for release on January 25, 2020, in China, but was withdrawn due to COVID-19 pandemic. The film debuted in China on September 25, 2020, a few days before the National Day of the People's Republic of China. That weekend, theaters were allowed to sell up to 75% of available tickets, compared to 50%, due to a loosening of COVID-19 restrictions. It made its United States debut on the same day across 80 theaters in select cities.

== Reception ==
On its first day at the Chinese box office, the film earned $8.2 million. It went on to earn 700 million yuan (approximately $104 million) through the Golden Week holiday.

== Awards and nominations ==
| Year | Award | Category | Recipient | Result | Ref. |
|---|---|---|---|---|---|
| 2020 | Golden Rooster Awards | Best Picture | Leap | Won | |
| 2020 | Golden Rooster Awards | Best Director | Peter Ho-Sun Chan | Nominated | |
| 2020 | Golden Rooster Awards | Best Writing | Ji Zhang | Won | |
| 2020 | Golden Rooster Awards | Best Supporting Actor | Gang Wu | Nominated | |
| 2020 | Golden Rooster Awards | Best Cinematographer | Xiaoshi Zhao | Won | |
| 2020 | Golden Rooster Awards | Best Art Director | Li Sun | Nominated | |
| 2020 | Golden Rooster Awards | Best Editor | Yibo Zhang | Nominated | |
| 2020 | Golden Rooster Awards | Best Sound | Zheng 'Joe' Huang | Nominated | |
| 2022 | 40th Hong Kong Film Awards | Best Director | Peter Chan | Nominated | |
| 2022 | 40th Hong Kong Film Awards | Best Actress | Gong Li | Nominated | |
| 2022 | 40th Hong Kong Film Awards | Best Supporting Actress | Bai Lang | Nominated | |

== See also ==
- List of submissions to the 93rd Academy Awards for Best International Feature Film
- List of Chinese submissions for the Academy Award for Best International Feature Film
- Chak De! India
