= Iraq men's national volleyball team =

National sports team

Iraq
- Nickname(s): Lions of Mesopotamia
- Association: Iraqi Volleyball Federation (IVF)
- Confederation: AVC
- Head coach: Alaa Khalaf
- FIVB ranking: NR (5 October 2025)

Uniforms
Home	Away

Asian Championship
- Appearances: 6 (First in 1979)
- Best result: 7th (1989)
Honours
AVC Cup
Gold medal – first place	2018 Colombo	Team
WAVA Championship
Bronze medal – third place	2026 Muscat	Team
Arab Championship
Silver medal – second place	1986 Amman	Team
Bronze medal – third place	1988 Riyadh	Team
Bronze medal – third place	2016 Cairo	Team
Pan Arab Games
Silver medal – second place	1985 Rabat	Team

The Iraq men's national volleyball team represents Iraq in international volleyball competitions and friendly matches. The team is currently ranked 131st in the world.

== Competition record ==
=== Asian Championship ===
Champions Runners up Third place Fourth place

Asian Championship record
Year	Round	Position	GP	MW	ML	SW	SL
(Australia) 1975	Did not enter						
(Bahrain) 1979	5th–8th places	8th	5	2	3	7	13
(Japan) 1983	Did not qualify						
(Kuwait) 1987	9th–12th places	9th	0	0	0	0	0
(South Korea) 1989	5th–8th places	7th	0	0	0	0	0
(Australia) 1991	Did not qualify						
(Thailand) 1993	Did not qualify						
(South Korea) 1995	Did not qualify						
(Qatar) 1997	Did not qualify						
(Iran) 1999	Did not qualify						
(South Korea) 2001	Did not qualify						
(China) 2003	Did not qualify						
(Thailand) 2005	Did not qualify						
(Indonesia) 2007	Did not qualify						
(Philippines) 2009	Did not qualify						
(Iran) 2011	Did not qualify						
(United Arab Emirates) 2013	13th place match	13th	8	3	5	10	18
(Iran) 2015	Did not qualify						
(Indonesia) 2017	13th place match	13th	8	3	5	12	17
(Iran) 2019	Did not qualify						
(Japan) 2021	Did not qualify						
(Iran) 2023	11th place match	12th	5	1	4	5	14
Total	0 Titles	6/22	0	0	0	0	0

=== Asian Games ===
Champions Runners up Third place Fourth place

Asian Games record
Year	Round	Position	GP	MW	ML	SW	SL
(Japan) 1958	Did not enter						
(Indonesia) 1962	Did not enter						
(Thailand) 1966	Did not enter						
(Thailand) 1970	Did not enter						
(Iran) 1974	Did not enter						
(Thailand) 1978	Final round	5th	9	3	6	11	18
(India) 1982	Final round	5th	6	5	1	0	0
(South Korea) 1986	Did not enter						
(China) 1990	Did not enter						
(Japan) 1994	Did not enter						
(Thailand) 1998	Did not enter						
(South Korea) 2002	Did not enter						
(Qatar) 2006	Did not enter						
(China) 2010	Did not enter						
(South Korea) 2014	Did not enter						
(Indonesia) 2018	Did not enter						
(China) 2022	Did not enter						
(Japan) 2026	Did not enter						
Total	0 Titles	2/18	15	8	7	0	0

=== AVC Cup ===
Champions Runners up Third place Fourth place

AVC Cup record
Year	Round	Position	GP	MW	ML	SW	SL	Squad
(Sri Lanka) 2018	Final	1st	6	5	1	17	9	Squad
(Kyrgyzstan) 2022	Did not participated							
(Taiwan) 2023	Did not participated							
(Bahrain) 2024	Did not participated							
(Bahrain) 2025	Did not participated							
(India) 2026	Did not participated							
Total	1 Title	1/6	6	5	1	17	9	—

=== WAVA Championship ===
Champions Runners up Third place Fourth place

WAVA Championship record
Year	Round	Position	GP	MW	ML	SW	SL	Squad
(Bahrain) 2025	Did not participated							
(Oman) 2026	Semifinals	3rd	5	3	2	9	8	Squad
Total	0 Titles	1/2	5	3	2	9	8	—

== Team ==
=== Former squads ===
2018 Asian Men's Volleyball Challenge Cup

- 2018 Asian Men's Volleyball Challenge Cup — (gold) Champions
