= Chen Yaqiong =

Chinese volleyball player (born 1956)

Personal information
- Born: 1956 (age 69–70); Yongchun County, China
- Height: 181 cm (5 ft 11 in)

Volleyball information
- Position: Middle blocker
- Number: 10 (1981); 7 (1982)

National team
1978–1982	China
Honours
Women's volleyball
Representing China
World Championship
Gold medal – first place	1982 Peru
FIVB World Cup
Gold medal – first place	1981 Japan
Asian Games
Gold medal – first place	1982 New Delhi	Team
Silver medal – second place	1978 Bangkok	Team

Chen Yaqiong (Chinese: 陈亚琼, born 1956) is a Chinese former volleyball player. She was a member of the Chinese national team that won gold at both the 1981 FIVB World Cup and the 1982 FIVB World Championship. She also won a gold medal at the 1982 Asian Games, after which she retired.

== Personal life ==
After her retirement from volleyball, Chen worked for the Hong Kong Liaison Office.

In 2018, the government of her hometown Tangxi Village in Hushan, Fujian built a "women's volleyball spirit" museum by remodeling her former residence, which collected many publications, art works, photos, and personal donations from Chen herself. It is the first women's volleyball museum in China.

She is the Fujianese girl in the 2020 movie Leap.
