= Chen Zhaodi =

Chinese volleyball player (1955–2013)

Personal information
- Born: 15 April 1955; Hangzhou, Zhejiang, China
- Died: 1 April 2013 (aged 57)
- Height: 1.82 m (6 ft 0 in)

Volleyball information
- Position: Setter
- Number: 7 (1981); 10 (1982)

National team
1977–1982	China
Honours
Women's volleyball
Representing China
World Championship
Gold medal – first place	1982 Peru
FIVB World Cup
Gold medal – first place	1981 Japan
Asian Games
Gold medal – first place	1982 New Delhi	Team
Silver medal – second place	1978 Bangkok	Team

Chen Zhaodi (Chinese: 陈招娣; 15 April 1955 – 1 April 2013) was a Chinese volleyball player, coach, and military general. She was a key member of the Chinese national team that won the 1981 FIVB World Cup and the 1982 FIVB World Championship. After retiring as a player in 1983, she served as assistant coach and later team manager for the national team, and as head coach for the national women's junior team. She later became Director of the Culture and Sports Bureau of the People's Liberation Army General Political Department and was awarded the rank of major general, making her the only Chinese sportsperson to become a military general. Chen suffered from cancer and died in 2013 at the age of 57.

== Early life ==
Chen was born on 15 April 1955 in Hangzhou, Zhejiang, China. She studied at Hangzhou No. 10 High School. In December 1970, she was selected to play for the Zhejiang Provincial Women's Volleyball Team at the age of 15.

== Career ==
=== Volleyball ===
In 1973, Chen was selected into the People's Liberation Army's Bayi Volleyball Team. In June 1979, she suffered an injury in an Asian Club Championship game against Japan's Hitachi Team and fractured the radial bone in her left arm. Two months later, she played for the Bayi team in the Fourth National Games of China with her left arm wrapped in bandage, henceforth earning the nickname "One-armed General".

In 1976, Chen was selected by China women's national volleyball team to play as a setter. Coached by Yuan Weimin, the team won its first Asian championship in 1979. In 1981, the team won the FIVB World Cup for the first time, and Chen played a key role in that victory, together with her teammate and close friend Lang Ping. The following year, the team won the 1982 FIVB World Championship in Peru. The team won three more world titles in the next four years and its members were hailed as national heroes in China. Chen retired in 1983 as a player and was an assistant coach for the team when it won the gold medal at the 1984 Summer Olympics. Beginning in 1983, she studied at Beijing Institute of Physical Education.

In 1986, Chen became the head coach of China's national junior team, which won the bronze medal at the 1987 Women's Junior Volleyball World Championships. However, she was diagnosed with cancer in 1988 and had to leave the post.

After undergoing cancer treatment, she joined the reorganized national women's volleyball team in 1989 and served as team manager until 1992. In 1993, she became Vice President of the Chinese Volleyball Association.

=== Military ===
In 1993, Chen joined the Culture and Sports Bureau of the People's Liberation Army General Political Department (GPD). She was later promoted to director of the bureau and deputy chief of the GPD's publicity department, and was awarded the rank of major general in July 2006. She is the only Chinese sportsperson to become a military general. In that capacity, she made the decision to allow the basketball star Wang Zhizhi to return to play in China. Wang, a former player of the military's Bayi Rockets team, had reneged on his promise to join the Chinese national team in order to play in the National Basketball Association in the United States, and many had wanted to punish him by forbidding him to play again in China after the end of his NBA career.

== Personal life ==
On 1 April 2013, Chen died in Beijing from cancer, at the age of 57. Her parents, two older sisters and a younger brother had all died from cancer. Nearly 1,000 people attended her funeral at the Babaoshan People's Cemetery.

Chen's story was written into middle-school textbooks in China.
