= 2022 AVC Men's Challenge Cup =

Asian men's volleyball tournament

эркектер арасындагы чакырык кубогу

Tournament details
- Host country: Kyrgyzstan
- City: Cholpon-Ata
- Dates: 29 August – 3 September
- Teams: 4 (from 1 confederation)
- Venue: 1 (in 1 host city)

Final positions
- Champions: Kyrgyzstan (1st title)
- Runners-up: Saudi Arabia
- Third place: Uzbekistan
- Fourth place: Mongolia

Tournament awards
- MVP: (Kyrgyzstan) Onolbek Kanybek Uulu
- Best Setter: (Kyrgyzstan) Medetbek Ergesh Uulu
- Best OH: (Saudi Arabia) Omar Alnajrani (Saudi Arabia) Ahmed Albakheet
- Best MB: (Uzbekistan) Azizbek Kurchkorov (Saudi Arabia) Ibrahim Majrashi
- Best OPP: (Kyrgyzstan) Omurbek Zhunusov
- Best Libero: (Kyrgyzstan) Kutmanbek Absatarov

Tournament statistics
- Matches played: 10
- Attendance: 2,550 (255 per match)

The 2022 AVC Men's Challenge Cup was the second edition of the AVC Challenge Cup, a biennial international volleyball tournament organised by the Asian Volleyball Confederation (AVC) and in that year with the Kyrgyzstan Volleyball Federation (KVF). The tournament was held in Cholpon-Ata, Kyrgyzstan from 29 August to 3 September 2022.

== Team ==
=== Qualification ===
Following the AVC regulations, The maximum of 16 teams in all AVC events will be selected by:

- 1 team for the host country
- 10 teams based on the final standing of the previous edition
- 5 teams from each of 5 zones (with a qualification tournament if needed)

=== Qualified teams ===
The following teams qualified for the tournament.

| Country | Zone | Qualified as | Qualified on | Previous appearances | | | Previous best performance |
| Country | Zone | Qualified as | Qualified on | Total | First | Last | Previous best performance |
|---|---|---|---|---|---|---|---|
| Saudi Arabia | CAZVA | 2018 AVC Challenge Cup runners-up | 21 September 2018 | 1 | 2018 | 2018 | Runners-up (2018) |
| ~~Sri Lanka~~ | ~~WAZVA~~ | ~~2018 AVC Challenge Cup third place~~ | ~~21 September 2018~~ | ~~1~~ | ~~2018~~ | ~~2018~~ | ~~3rd place (2018)~~ |
| ~~United Arab Emirates~~ | ~~WAZVA~~ | ~~2018 AVC Challenge Cup fifth place~~ | ~~21 September 2018~~ | ~~1~~ | ~~2018~~ | ~~2018~~ | ~~5th place (2018)~~ |
| Mongolia | EAZVA | 2018 AVC Challenge Cup 8th place | 21 September 2022 | 1 | 2018 | 2018 | 8th place (2018) |
| Kyrgyzstan | CAZVA | Host country | 2 December 2021 | 0 | None | | None |
| ~~Kuwait~~ | ~~CAZVA~~ | ~~1st CAZVA team~~ | ~~2 February 2022~~ | ~~0~~ | ~~None~~ | | ~~None~~ |
| Uzbekistan | WAZVA | 2nd WAZVA team | 2 February 2022 | 0 | None | | None |

== Venue ==
All matches
Cholpon-Ata, Kyrgyzstan
Gazprom Sports and Recreation Complex
Capacity: Unknown

== Pool standing procedure ==
1. Total number of victories (matches won, matches lost)
2. In the event of a tie, the following first tiebreaker will apply: The teams will be ranked by the most point gained per match as follows:
  - Match won 3–0 or 3–1: 3 points for the winner, 0 points for the loser
  - Match won 3–2: 2 points for the winner, 1 point for the loser
  - Match forfeited: 3 points for the winner, 0 points (0–25, 0–25, 0–25) for the loser
3. If teams are still tied after examining the number of victories and points gained, then the AVC will examine the results in order to break the tie in the following order:
  - Set quotient: if two or more teams are tied on the number of points gained, they will be ranked by the quotient resulting from the division of the number of all set won by the number of all sets lost.
  - Points quotient: if the tie persists based on the set quotient, the teams will be ranked by the quotient resulting from the division of all points scored by the total of points lost during all sets.
  - If the tie persists based on the point quotient, the tie will be broken based on the team that won the match of the Round Robin Phase between the tied teams. When the tie in point quotient is between three or more teams, these teams ranked taking into consideration only the matches involving the teams in question.

== Squads ==
The full list of team squads were announced on the competition daily bulletin.

== Preliminary round ==
- All times are Kyrgyzstan Time (UTC+6:00).

=== Ranking ===
| Pos | Team | Pld | W | L | Pts | SW | SL | SR | SPW | SPL | SPR | Qualification |
|---|---|---|---|---|---|---|---|---|---|---|---|---|
| 1 | Saudi Arabia | 3 | 3 | 0 | 8 | 9 | 3 | 3.000 | 286 | 251 | 1.139 | Semifinals |
| 2 | Mongolia | 3 | 2 | 1 | 6 | 6 | 4 | 1.500 | 232 | 224 | 1.036 | Semifinals |
| 3 | Kyrgyzstan | 3 | 1 | 2 | 3 | 4 | 7 | 0.571 | 240 | 259 | 0.927 | Semifinals |
| 4 | Uzbekistan | 3 | 0 | 3 | 1 | 4 | 9 | 0.444 | 284 | 308 | 0.922 | Semifinals |

=== Match results ===
| Date | Time | | Score | | Set 1 | Set 2 | Set 3 | Set 4 | Set 5 | Total | Report |
|---|---|---|---|---|---|---|---|---|---|---|---|
| 29 Aug | 15:30 | Uzbekistan | 2–3 | Saudi Arabia | 16–25 | 23–25 | 30–28 | 25–18 | 16–18 | 110–114 | Report |
| 29 Aug | 18:15 | Kyrgyzstan | 0–3 | Mongolia | 21–25 | 25–27 | 14–25 | | | 60–77 | Report |
| 30 Aug | 15:30 | Mongolia | 0–3 | Saudi Arabia | 22–25 | 11–25 | 21–25 | | | 54–75 | Report |
| 30 Aug | 18:00 | Kyrgyzstan | 3–1 | Uzbekistan | 25–19 | 18–25 | 25–22 | 25–19 | | 93–85 | Report |
| 31 Aug | 15:30 | Uzbekistan | 1–3 | Mongolia | 17–25 | 22–25 | 28–26 | 22–25 | | 89–101 | Report |
| 31 Aug | 18:15 | Saudi Arabia | 3–1 | Kyrgyzstan | 25–20 | 21–25 | 26–24 | 25–18 | | 97–87 | Report |

== Final round ==
- All times are Kyrgyzstan Time (UTC+6:00).

Semifinals
2 September
Saudi Arabia | 3
Uzbekistan | 1
2 September
Mongolia | 0
Kyrgyzstan | 3

Final
3 September
Saudi Arabia | 2
Kyrgyzstan | 3
3rd place match
3 September
Uzbekistan | 3
Mongolia | 2

=== Semifinals ===
| Date | Time | | Score | | Set 1 | Set 2 | Set 3 | Set 4 | Set 5 | Total | Report |
|---|---|---|---|---|---|---|---|---|---|---|---|
| 2 Sep | 15:30 | Saudi Arabia | 3–1 | Uzbekistan | 25–23 | 25–23 | 23–25 | 25–20 | | 98–91 | Report |
| 2 Sep | 18:15 | Mongolia | 0–3 | Kyrgyzstan | 22–25 | 21–25 | 23–25 | | | 66–75 | Report |

=== Third place match ===
| Date | Time | | Score | | Set 1 | Set 2 | Set 3 | Set 4 | Set 5 | Total | Report |
|---|---|---|---|---|---|---|---|---|---|---|---|
| 3 Sep | 14:00 | Uzbekistan | 3–2 | Mongolia | 19–25 | 28–26 | 20–25 | 28–26 | 15–10 | 110–112 | Report |

=== Final ===
| Date | Time | | Score | | Set 1 | Set 2 | Set 3 | Set 4 | Set 5 | Total | Report |
|---|---|---|---|---|---|---|---|---|---|---|---|
| 3 Sep | 16:30 | Saudi Arabia | 2–3 | Kyrgyzstan | 31–29 | 25–20 | 23–25 | 22–25 | 11–15 | 112–114 | Report |

== Final standing ==
| Rank | Team |
|---|---|
| 1st place, gold medalist(s) | Kyrgyzstan |
| 2nd place, silver medalist(s) | Saudi Arabia |
| 3rd place, bronze medalist(s) | Uzbekistan |
| 4 | Mongolia |

2022 Asian Challenge Cup champions

Kyrgyzstan
First title

14–man roster
Doorbek Umarov, Kutmanbek Absatarov, Medetbek Ergesh Uulu, Nurislam Medetbek Uulu, Nurmukhammed Toktaev, Onolbek Kanybek Uulu (c), Damir Gazinur Uulu, Temir Musa Uulu, Omurbek Zhunusov, Zhamalidin Musaev, Zhantemir Zheenbek Uulu, Roman Zhilov, Azamat Zhumabek, Kozhomberdi Uulu
Head coach
Andrei Ankudinov

== Awards ==
- Most valuable player
  Onolbel Kanybek Uulu (KGZ)
- Best setter
  Medetbek Ergesh Uulu (KGZ)
- Best outside spikers
  Omar Alnajrani (KSA)
  Ahmed Albakheet (KSA)
- Best middle blockers
  Azizbek Kurchkorov (UZB)
  Ibrahim Majrashi (KSA)
- Best opposite spiker
  Omurbek Zhunusov (KGZ)
- Best libero
  Kutmanbek Absatarov (KGZ)

== See also ==
- 2022 Asian Men's Volleyball Cup
