= 1987 Asian Men's Volleyball Championship =

International volleyball tournament

Tournament details
- Host country: Kuwait
- City: Kuwait City
- Dates: 15–25 October
- Teams: 17
- Venue: 1 (in 1 host city)

Final positions
- Champions: Japan (3rd title)
- Runners-up: China
- Third place: South Korea
- Fourth place: Kuwait

The Asian Men's Volleyball Championship was the fourth staging of the Asian Men's Volleyball Championship, a quadrennial international volleyball tournament organised by the Asian Volleyball Confederation (AVC) with Kuwait Volleyball Association (KVA). The tournament was held in Kuwait City, Kuwait from 15 to 25 October 1987.

== Preliminary round ==
=== Pool A ===
| Pos | Team | Pld | W | L | Pts | SW | SL | SR | SPW | SPL | SPR | Qualification |
|---|---|---|---|---|---|---|---|---|---|---|---|---|
| 1 | Japan | 3 | 3 | 0 | 6 | 9 | 0 | MAX | 135 | 32 | 4.219 | Pool E |
| 2 | Pakistan | 3 | 2 | 1 | 5 | 6 | 3 | 2.000 | 98 | 87 | 1.126 | Pool E |
| 3 | Australia | 3 | 1 | 2 | 4 | 3 | 8 | 0.375 | 116 | 144 | 0.806 | Pool G |
| 4 | Saudi Arabia | 3 | 0 | 3 | 3 | 2 | 9 | 0.222 | 74 | 160 | 0.463 | Pool G |

| Date | | Score | | Set 1 | Set 2 | Set 3 | Set 4 | Set 5 | Total |
|---|---|---|---|---|---|---|---|---|---|
| 17 Oct | Japan | 3–0 | Australia | 15–1 | 15–9 | 15–4 | | | 45–14 |
| 17 Oct | Pakistan | 3–0 | Saudi Arabia | 15–3 | 15–2 | 15–5 | | | 45–10 |
| 18 Oct | Australia | 3–2 | Saudi Arabia | 12–15 | 13–15 | 15–13 | 15–9 | 15–2 | 70–54 |
| 18 Oct | Japan | 3–0 | Pakistan | 15–1 | 15–5 | 15–2 | | | 45–8 |
| 19 Oct | Pakistan | 3–0 | Australia | 15–12 | 15–10 | 15–10 | | | 45–32 |
| 19 Oct | Japan | 3–0 | Saudi Arabia | 15–2 | 15–4 | 15–4 | | | 45–10 |

=== Pool B ===
| Pos | Team | Pld | W | L | Pts | SW | SL | SR | SPW | SPL | SPR | Qualification |
|---|---|---|---|---|---|---|---|---|---|---|---|---|
| 1 | Kuwait | 3 | 3 | 0 | 6 | 9 | 2 | 4.500 | 0 | 0 | — | Pool F |
| 2 | Bahrain | 3 | 2 | 1 | 5 | 8 | 4 | 2.000 | 0 | 0 | — | Pool F |
| 3 | New Zealand | 3 | 1 | 2 | 4 | 4 | 6 | 0.667 | 0 | 0 | — | Pool H |
| 4 | South Yemen | 3 | 0 | 3 | 3 | 0 | 9 | 0.000 | 0 | 0 | — | Pool H |

| Date | | Score | | Set 1 | Set 2 | Set 3 | Set 4 | Set 5 | Total |
|---|---|---|---|---|---|---|---|---|---|
| 16 Oct | Bahrain | 3–0 | South Yemen | | | | | | |
| 16 Oct | Kuwait | 3–0 | New Zealand | | | | | | |
| 17 Oct | Bahrain | 3–1 | New Zealand | 15–13 | 14–16 | 15–10 | 15–13 | | 59–52 |
| 18 Oct | New Zealand | 3–0 | South Yemen | 15–9 | 15–6 | 15–12 | | | 45–27 |
| 19 Oct | Kuwait | 3–2 | Bahrain | 15–13 | 15–10 | 7–15 | 6–15 | 15–12 | 58–65 |
| 20 Oct | Kuwait | 3–0 | South Yemen | 15–7 | 15–1 | 15–0 | | | 45–8 |

=== Pool C ===
| Pos | Team | Pld | W | L | Pts | SW | SL | SR | SPW | SPL | SPR | Qualification |
|---|---|---|---|---|---|---|---|---|---|---|---|---|
| 1 | China | 3 | 3 | 0 | 6 | 9 | 0 | MAX | 136 | 61 | 2.230 | Pool E |
| 2 | India | 3 | 2 | 1 | 5 | 6 | 3 | 2.000 | 128 | 86 | 1.488 | Pool E |
| 3 | Iran | 3 | 1 | 2 | 4 | 3 | 6 | 0.500 | 89 | 128 | 0.695 | Pool G |
| 4 | Thailand | 3 | 0 | 3 | 3 | 0 | 9 | 0.000 | 62 | 140 | 0.443 | Pool G |

| Date | | Score | | Set 1 | Set 2 | Set 3 | Set 4 | Set 5 | Total |
|---|---|---|---|---|---|---|---|---|---|
| 17 Oct | China | 3–0 | Thailand | 15–3 | 15–2 | 15–5 | | | 45–10 |
| 17 Oct | India | 3–0 | Iran | 15–9 | 15–8 | 15–9 | | | 45–26 |
| 18 Oct | Iran | 3–0 | Thailand | 15–7 | 19–17 | 16–14 | | | 50–38 |
| 18 Oct | China | 3–0 | India | 16–14 | 15–13 | 15–11 | | | 46–38 |
| 19 Oct | China | 3–0 | Iran | 15–5 | 15–6 | 15–2 | | | 45–13 |
| 19 Oct | India | 3–0 | Thailand | 15–5 | 15–2 | 15–7 | | | 45–14 |

=== Pool D ===
| Pos | Team | Pld | W | L | Pts | SW | SL | SR | SPW | SPL | SPR | Qualification |
|---|---|---|---|---|---|---|---|---|---|---|---|---|
| 1 | South Korea | 4 | 4 | 0 | 8 | 12 | 2 | 6.000 | 203 | 110 | 1.845 | Pool F |
| 2 | Chinese Taipei | 4 | 3 | 1 | 7 | 11 | 3 | 3.667 | 203 | 131 | 1.550 | Pool F |
| 3 | Iraq | 4 | 2 | 2 | 6 | 6 | 0 | MAX | 0 | 0 | — | Pool H |
| 4 | United Arab Emirates | 4 | 1 | 3 | 5 | 0 | 9 | 0.000 | 0 | 0 | — | Pool H |
| 5 | Jordan | 4 | 0 | 4 | 4 | 0 | 12 | 0.000 | 66 | 181 | 0.365 | 17th place |

| Date | | Score | | Set 1 | Set 2 | Set 3 | Set 4 | Set 5 | Total |
|---|---|---|---|---|---|---|---|---|---|
| 16 Oct | South Korea | 3–2 | Chinese Taipei | 15–12 | 14–16 | 15–10 | 6–15 | 16–14 | 66–67 |
| 16 Oct | Iraq | 3–? | United Arab Emirates | | | | | | |
| 17 Oct | Chinese Taipei | 3–0 | Iraq | 15–9 | 15–11 | 15–9 | | | 45–29 |
| 17 Oct | South Korea | 3–0 | Jordan | 15–6 | 15–1 | 15–4 | | | 45–11 |
| 18 Oct | Chinese Taipei | 3–0 | United Arab Emirates | 15–3 | 15–12 | 15–5 | | | 45–20 |
| 18 Oct | Iraq | 3–0 | Jordan | 15–8 | 15–2 | 15–5 | | | 45–15 |
| 19 Oct | South Korea | 3–0 | Iraq | 15–2 | 15–4 | 17–15 | | | 47–21 |
| 19 Oct | United Arab Emirates | 3–0 | Jordan | 15–10 | 15–6 | 15–8 | | | 45–24 |
| 20 Oct | South Korea | 3–0 | United Arab Emirates | 15–7 | 15–1 | 15–0 | | | 45–8 |
| 20 Oct | Chinese Taipei | 3–0 | Jordan | 15–0 | 15–2 | 16–14 | | | 46–16 |

== Classification round ==
| Qualified for the 1st–4th places |
| Qualified for the 5th–8th places |
| Qualified for the 9th–12th places |
| Qualified for the 13th–16th places |

=== Pool E ===
| Pos | Team | Pld | W | L | Pts | SW | SL | SR | SPW | SPL | SPR | Qualification |
|---|---|---|---|---|---|---|---|---|---|---|---|---|
| 1 | Japan | 3 | 3 | 0 | 6 | 9 | 0 | MAX | 0 | 0 | — | Semifinals |
| 2 | South Korea | 3 | 2 | 1 | 5 | 6 | 5 | 1.200 | 0 | 0 | — | Semifinals |
| 3 | Chinese Taipei | 3 | 1 | 2 | 4 | 5 | 6 | 0.833 | 0 | 0 | — | 5th–8th place |
| 4 | Pakistan | 3 | 0 | 3 | 3 | 2 | 9 | 0.222 | 0 | 0 | — | 5th–8th place |

| Date | | Score | | Set 1 | Set 2 | Set 3 | Set 4 | Set 5 | Total |
|---|---|---|---|---|---|---|---|---|---|
| 22 Oct | South Korea | 3–0 | Pakistan | | | | | | |
| 22 Oct | Japan | 3–0 | Chinese Taipei | | | | | | |
| 23 Oct | Chinese Taipei | 3–0 | Pakistan | | | | | | |
| 23 Oct | Japan | 3–0 | South Korea | 15–7 | 15–9 | 15–10 | | | 45–26 |

=== Pool F ===
| Pos | Team | Pld | W | L | Pts | SW | SL | SR | SPW | SPL | SPR | Qualification |
|---|---|---|---|---|---|---|---|---|---|---|---|---|
| 1 | China | 3 | 3 | 0 | 6 | 0 | 0 | — | 0 | 0 | — | Semifinals |
| 2 | Kuwait | 3 | 2 | 1 | 5 | 0 | 0 | — | 0 | 0 | — | Semifinals |
| 3 | India | 3 | 1 | 2 | 4 | 0 | 0 | — | 0 | 0 | — | 5th–8th place |
| 4 | Bahrain | 3 | 0 | 3 | 3 | 0 | 0 | — | 0 | 0 | — | 5th–8th place |

| Date | | Score | | Set 1 | Set 2 | Set 3 | Set 4 | Set 5 | Total |
|---|---|---|---|---|---|---|---|---|---|
| 22 Oct | China | 3–? | Bahrain | | | | | | |
| 22 Oct | Kuwait | 3–? | India | | | | | | |
| 23 Oct | India | 3–? | Bahrain | | | | | | |
| 23 Oct | China | 3–? | Kuwait | | | | | | |

=== Pool G ===
Information is not available

| Pos | Team | Pld | W | L | Pts | SW | SL | SR | SPW | SPL | SPR | Qualification |
|---|---|---|---|---|---|---|---|---|---|---|---|---|
| 1 | Iraq | 0 | 0 | 0 | 0 | 0 | 0 | — | 0 | 0 | — | 9th–12th place |
| 2 | Australia | 0 | 0 | 0 | 0 | 0 | 0 | — | 0 | 0 | — | 9th–12th place |
| 3 | Saudi Arabia | 0 | 0 | 0 | 0 | 0 | 0 | — | 0 | 0 | — | 13th–16th place |
| 4 | United Arab Emirates | 0 | 0 | 0 | 0 | 0 | 0 | — | 0 | 0 | — | 13th–16th place |

| Date | | Score | | Set 1 | Set 2 | Set 3 | Set 4 | Set 5 | Total |
|---|---|---|---|---|---|---|---|---|---|
| 22 Oct | Iraq | – | Saudi Arabia | | | | | | |
| 22 Oct | Australia | – | United Arab Emirates | | | | | | |
| 23 Oct | Iraq | – | Australia | | | | | | |
| 23 Oct | Saudi Arabia | – | United Arab Emirates | | | | | | |

=== Pool H ===
Information is not available

| Pos | Team | Pld | W | L | Pts | SW | SL | SR | SPW | SPL | SPR | Qualification |
|---|---|---|---|---|---|---|---|---|---|---|---|---|
| 1 | Iran | 0 | 0 | 0 | 0 | 0 | 0 | — | 0 | 0 | — | 9th–12th place |
| 2 | New Zealand | 0 | 0 | 0 | 0 | 0 | 0 | — | 0 | 0 | — | 9th–12th place |
| 3 | Thailand | 0 | 0 | 0 | 0 | 0 | 0 | — | 0 | 0 | — | 13th–16th place |
| 4 | South Yemen | 0 | 0 | 0 | 0 | 0 | 0 | — | 0 | 0 | — | 13th–16th place |

| Date | | Score | | Set 1 | Set 2 | Set 3 | Set 4 | Set 5 | Total |
|---|---|---|---|---|---|---|---|---|---|
| 22 Oct | Iran | – | South Yemen | | | | | | |
| 22 Oct | New Zealand | – | Thailand | | | | | | |
| 23 Oct | Iran | – | New Zealand | | | | | | |
| 23 Oct | Thailand | – | South Yemen | | | | | | |

== Final round ==
=== Classification 13th–16th ===
13th–16th semifinals
24 October – Kuwait City
Saudi Arabia | 3
South Yemen | 0
24 October – Kuwait City
Thailand | 3
United Arab Emirates | 2

13th place match
25 October – Kuwait City
Saudi Arabia | 3
Thailand
15th place match
25 October – Kuwait City
South Yemen
United Arab Emirates | 3

==== 13th–16th semifinals ====
| Date | | Score | | Set 1 | Set 2 | Set 3 | Set 4 | Set 5 | Total |
|---|---|---|---|---|---|---|---|---|---|
| 24 Oct | Saudi Arabia | 3–0 | South Yemen | 15–4 | 17–15 | 15–5 | | | 47–34 |
| 24 Oct | Thailand | 3–2 | United Arab Emirates | 15–13 | 2–15 | 15–13 | 13–15 | 16–14 | 61–70 |

==== 15th place match ====
| Date | | Score | | Set 1 | Set 2 | Set 3 | Set 4 | Set 5 | Total |
|---|---|---|---|---|---|---|---|---|---|
| 25 Oct | Saudi Arabia | 3–? | Thailand | | | | | | |

==== 13th place match ====
| Date | | Score | | Set 1 | Set 2 | Set 3 | Set 4 | Set 5 | Total |
|---|---|---|---|---|---|---|---|---|---|
| 25 Oct | South Yemen | ?–3 | United Arab Emirates | | | | | | |

=== Classification 9th–12th ===
9th–12th semifinals
24 October – Kuwait City
Iraq | 3
New Zealand | 0
24 October – Kuwait City
Iran | 3
Australia | 1

9th place match
25 October – Kuwait City
Iraq | 3
Iran | 1
11th place match
25 October – Kuwait City
New Zealand
Australia | 3

==== 9th–12th semifinals ====
| Date | | Score | | Set 1 | Set 2 | Set 3 | Set 4 | Set 5 | Total |
|---|---|---|---|---|---|---|---|---|---|
| 24 Oct | Iraq | 3–0 | New Zealand | 15–8 | 15–9 | 15–10 | | | 45–27 |
| 24 Oct | Iran | 3–1 | Australia | 16–14 | 16—14 | 2–15 | 16–14 | | 50–57 |

==== 11th place match ====
| Date | | Score | | Set 1 | Set 2 | Set 3 | Set 4 | Set 5 | Total |
|---|---|---|---|---|---|---|---|---|---|
| 25 Oct | New Zealand | ?–3 | Australia | | | | | | |

==== 9th place match ====
| Date | | Score | | Set 1 | Set 2 | Set 3 | Set 4 | Set 5 | Total |
|---|---|---|---|---|---|---|---|---|---|
| 25 Oct | Iraq | 3–1 | Iran | 15–7 | 8–15 | 15–12 | 15–11 | | 53–45 |

=== Classification 5th–8th ===
5th–8th semifinals
24 October – Kuwait City
India | 3
Pakistan | 0
24 October – Kuwait City
Chinese Taipei | 3
Bahrain | 0

5th place match
25 October – Kuwait City
India | 3
Chinese Taipei
7th place match
25 October – Kuwait City
Pakistan | 3
Bahrain

==== 5th–8th semifinals ====
| Date | | Score | | Set 1 | Set 2 | Set 3 | Set 4 | Set 5 | Total |
|---|---|---|---|---|---|---|---|---|---|
| 24 Oct | India | 3–0 | Pakistan | 15–4 | 15–5 | 15–9 | | | 45–18 |
| 24 Oct | Chinese Taipei | 3–0 | Bahrain | 15–12 | 15–13 | 15–10 | | | 45–34 |

==== 7th place match ====
| Date | | Score | | Set 1 | Set 2 | Set 3 | Set 4 | Set 5 | Total |
|---|---|---|---|---|---|---|---|---|---|
| 25 Oct | Pakistan | 3–? | Bahrain | | | | | | |

==== 5th place match ====
| Date | | Score | | Set 1 | Set 2 | Set 3 | Set 4 | Set 5 | Total |
|---|---|---|---|---|---|---|---|---|---|
| 25 Oct | India | 3–? | Chinese Taipei | | | | | | |

=== Championship ===
Semifinals
24 October – Kuwait City
Japan | 3
Kuwait | 0
24 October – Kuwait City
China | 3
South Korea | 1

Final
25 October – Kuwait City
Japan | 3
China | 0
3rd place match
25 October – Kuwait City
Kuwait
South Korea | 3

==== Semifinals ====
| Date | | Score | | Set 1 | Set 2 | Set 3 | Set 4 | Set 5 | Total |
|---|---|---|---|---|---|---|---|---|---|
| 24 Oct | Japan | 3–0 | Kuwait | 15–3 | 15–9 | 15–10 | | | 45–22 |
| 24 Oct | China | 3–1 | South Korea | 15–7 | 12–15 | 15–9 | 15–10 | | 57–41 |

==== 3rd place match ====
| Date | | Score | | Set 1 | Set 2 | Set 3 | Set 4 | Set 5 | Total |
|---|---|---|---|---|---|---|---|---|---|
| 25 Oct | Kuwait | ?–3 | South Korea | | | | | | |

==== Final ====
| Date | | Score | | Set 1 | Set 2 | Set 3 | Set 4 | Set 5 | Total |
|---|---|---|---|---|---|---|---|---|---|
| 25 Oct | Japan | 3–0 | China | 15–13 | 15–4 | 15–9 | | | 45–26 |

== Final standing ==
| Rank | Team |
|---|---|
| 1st place, gold medalist(s) | Japan |
| 2nd place, silver medalist(s) | China |
| 3rd place, bronze medalist(s) | South Korea |
| 4 | Kuwait |
| 5 | India |
| 6 | Chinese Taipei |
| 7 | Pakistan |
| 8 | Bahrain |
| 9 | Iraq |
| 10 | Iran |
| 11 | Australia |
| 12 | New Zealand |
| 13 | Saudi Arabia |
| 14 | Thailand |
| 15 | United Arab Emirates |
| 16 | South Yemen |
| 17 | Jordan |

| Qualified for the 1988 Summer Olympics |
| Qualified for the 1988 Olympic Qualifier (India later withdrew) |
| Already qualified for the 1988 Summer Olympics as Hosts |

1987 Asian Men's champions

Japan
3rd title
