= Sun Jinfang =

Chinese volleyball player

Personal information
- Born: 6 April 1955 (age 71); Shanghai, China
- Height: 175 cm (5 ft 9 in)

Volleyball information
- Position: Setter
- Number: 6 (1981); 9 (1982)

National team
1977–1982	China
Honours
Women's volleyball
Representing China
World Championship
Gold medal – first place	1982 Peru
FIVB World Cup
Gold medal – first place	1981 Japan
Asian Games
Gold medal – first place	1982 New Delhi	Team
Silver medal – second place	1978 Bangkok	Team

Sun Jinfang (Chinese: 孙晋芳, born 6 April 1955) is a Chinese former volleyball player who played the setter position. Sun captained China to the gold medal at both the 1981 FIVB World Cup in Japan and the 1982 FIVB World Championship in Peru. She also won a silver medal at the 1978 Asian Games and a gold medal at the 1982 Asian Games.

== Personal life ==
Sun became the director of China's tennis program in 2003.

== Awards ==
=== Individuals ===
- 1981 FIVB World Cup "Most valuable player"
- 1981 FIVB World Cup "Best setter"

=== National team ===
As a player

- 1978 Asian Games - (silver) Silver Medal
- 1981 World Cup - (gold) Gold Medal
- 1982 World Championship - (gold) Gold Medal
- 1982 Asian Games - (gold) Gold Medal

== Popular culture ==
Volleyball player Chen Zhan played Sun Jinfang in the 2020 film Leap.
