= 1982 FIVB Women's Volleyball World Championship =

Volleyball competition held in Peru

1982 FIVB Women's World Championship
Tournament details
- Host country: Peru
- Dates: 12–25 September
- Teams: 23
- Venues: 6 (in 6 host cities)
- Officially opened by: Fernando Belaúnde Terry

Final positions
- Champions: China (1st title)
- Runners-up: Peru
- Third place: United States
- Fourth place: Japan

Tournament awards
- MVP: (China) Lang Ping

The 1982 FIVB Women's World Championship was the ninth edition of the tournament, organised by the world's governing body, the FIVB. It was held from 12 to 25 September 1982 at six venues in six different cities in Peru. The finals were held at the Coliseo Amauta in Lima, Peru.

== Venues ==
| Pool F | Pool A, G, Final round | Pool B, H, Final round | 1982 FIVB Women's Volleyball World Championship is located in Peru |
| Chiclayo | Lima | Trujillo | 1982 FIVB Women's Volleyball World Championship is located in Peru |
| Coliseo Cerrado de Chiclayo | Coliseo Amauta | Coliseo Gran Chimu | 1982 FIVB Women's Volleyball World Championship is located in Peru |
| Capacity: 5.000 | Capacity: 20.000 | Capacity: 7.000 | 1982 FIVB Women's Volleyball World Championship is located in Peru |
| Pool D, J, Final round | Pool E, I, Final round | Pool C | 1982 FIVB Women's Volleyball World Championship is located in Peru |
| Ica | Arequipa | Tacna | 1982 FIVB Women's Volleyball World Championship is located in Peru |
| Coliseo José Oliva Razzetto | Coliseo Arequipa | Coliseo Cerrado Peru | 1982 FIVB Women's Volleyball World Championship is located in Peru |
| Capacity: 6.000 | Capacity: 10.000 | Capacity: 6.000 | 1982 FIVB Women's Volleyball World Championship is located in Peru |

== Pools composition ==
The teams are seeded based on their final ranking at the 1978 FIVB Women's World Championship.

| Pool A | Pool B | Pool C |
|---|---|---|
| Peru (Host, 10th); Canada (14th); Indonesia; Nigeria | Cuba (1st); Hungary (13th); Netherlands; Argentina | Japan (2nd); Bulgaria (9th); Mexico; Spain |
| Pool D | Pool E | Pool F |
| Soviet Union (3rd); ~~East Germany (8th)~~* Australia; ~~Czechoslovakia~~** | South Korea (4th); Brazil (7th); West Germany; Paraguay | United States (5th); China (6th); Italy; ~~Dominican Republic~~*** |

*: Withdrew and replaced by Peru junior team, its result did not count in the championship.
**: Withdrew and replaced by Chile.
***: Withdrew and replaced by Puerto Rico.

== Results ==
=== First round ===
==== Pool A ====
Location: Lima

| Pos | Team | Pld | W | L | Pts | SW | SL | SR | SPW | SPL | SPR | Qualification |
|---|---|---|---|---|---|---|---|---|---|---|---|---|
| 1 | Peru | 3 | 3 | 0 | 6 | 9 | 0 | MAX | 135 | 21 | 6.429 | 1st–12th pools |
| 2 | Canada | 3 | 2 | 1 | 5 | 6 | 3 | 2.000 | 106 | 66 | 1.606 | 1st–12th pools |
| 3 | Indonesia | 3 | 1 | 2 | 4 | 3 | 6 | 0.500 | 64 | 111 | 0.577 | 13th–23rd pools |
| 4 | Nigeria | 3 | 0 | 3 | 3 | 0 | 9 | 0.000 | 28 | 135 | 0.207 | 13th–23rd pools |

| Date | | Score | | Set 1 | Set 2 | Set 3 | Set 4 | Set 5 | Total |
|---|---|---|---|---|---|---|---|---|---|
| 12 Sep | Peru | 3–0 | Indonesia | 15–2 | 15–0 | 15–3 | | | 45–5 |
| 13 Sep | Canada | 3–0 | Nigeria | 15–3 | 15–0 | 15–4 | | | 45–7 |
| 14 Sep | Canada | 3–0 | Indonesia | 15–2 | 15–7 | 15–5 | | | 45–14 |
| 14 Sep | Peru | 3–0 | Nigeria | 15–0 | 15–0 | 15–0 | | | 45–0 |
| 15 Sep | Nigeria | 0–3 | Indonesia | 8–15 | 6–15 | 7–15 | | | 21–45 |
| 15 Sep | Peru | 3–0 | Canada | 15–1 | 15–11 | 15–4 | | | 45–16 |

==== Pool B ====
Location: Trujillo

| Pos | Team | Pld | W | L | Pts | SW | SL | SR | SPW | SPL | SPR | Qualification |
|---|---|---|---|---|---|---|---|---|---|---|---|---|
| 1 | Cuba | 3 | 3 | 0 | 6 | 9 | 1 | 9.000 | 141 | 65 | 2.169 | 1st–12th pools |
| 2 | Hungary | 3 | 2 | 1 | 5 | 7 | 4 | 1.750 | 137 | 98 | 1.398 | 1st–12th pools |
| 3 | Netherlands | 3 | 1 | 2 | 4 | 3 | 6 | 0.500 | 75 | 109 | 0.688 | 13th–23rd pools |
| 4 | Argentina | 3 | 0 | 3 | 3 | 1 | 9 | 0.111 | 65 | 146 | 0.445 | 13th–23rd pools |

| Date | | Score | | Set 1 | Set 2 | Set 3 | Set 4 | Set 5 | Total |
|---|---|---|---|---|---|---|---|---|---|
| 13 Sep | Hungary | 3–1 | Argentina | 15–6 | 11–15 | 15–4 | 15–10 | | 56–35 |
| 13 Sep | Cuba | 3–0 | Netherlands | 15–10 | 15–6 | 15–2 | | | 45–18 |
| 14 Sep | Netherlands | 0–3 | Hungary | 4–15 | 5–15 | 3–15 | | | 12–45 |
| 14 Sep | Cuba | 3–0 | Argentina | 15–5 | 15–3 | 15–3 | | | 45–11 |
| 15 Sep | Netherlands | 3–0 | Argentina | 15–12 | 15–6 | 15–1 | | | 45–19 |
| 15 Sep | Cuba | 3–1 | Hungary | 15–9 | 6–15 | 15–6 | 15–6 | | 51–36 |

==== Pool C ====
Location: Tacna

| Pos | Team | Pld | W | L | Pts | SW | SL | SR | SPW | SPL | SPR | Qualification |
|---|---|---|---|---|---|---|---|---|---|---|---|---|
| 1 | Japan | 3 | 3 | 0 | 6 | 9 | 0 | MAX | 135 | 26 | 5.192 | 1st–12th pools |
| 2 | Bulgaria | 3 | 2 | 1 | 5 | 6 | 5 | 1.200 | 109 | 127 | 0.858 | 1st–12th pools |
| 3 | Mexico | 3 | 1 | 2 | 4 | 5 | 6 | 0.833 | 129 | 122 | 1.057 | 13th–23rd pools |
| 4 | Spain | 3 | 0 | 3 | 3 | 0 | 9 | 0.000 | 37 | 135 | 0.274 | 13th–23rd pools |

| Date | | Score | | Set 1 | Set 2 | Set 3 | Set 4 | Set 5 | Total |
|---|---|---|---|---|---|---|---|---|---|
| 13 Sep | Bulgaria | 3–2 | Mexico | 7–15 | 15–13 | 16–14 | 4–15 | 15–10 | 57–67 |
| 13 Sep | Japan | 3–0 | Spain | 15–0 | 15–2 | 15–0 | | | 45–2 |
| 14 Sep | Spain | 0–3 | Bulgaria | 3–15 | 7–15 | 5–15 | | | 15–45 |
| 14 Sep | Japan | 3–0 | Mexico | 15–2 | 15–12 | 15–3 | | | 45–17 |
| 15 Sep | Mexico | 3–0 | Spain | 15–5 | 15–7 | 15–8 | | | 45–20 |
| 15 Sep | Japan | 3–0 | Bulgaria | 15–3 | 15–0 | 15–4 | | | 45–7 |

==== Pool D ====
Location: Ica

| Pos | Team | Pld | W | L | Pts | SW | SL | SR | SPW | SPL | SPR | Qualification |
|---|---|---|---|---|---|---|---|---|---|---|---|---|
| 1 | Soviet Union | 2 | 2 | 0 | 4 | 6 | 0 | MAX | 90 | 11 | 8.182 | 1st–12th pools |
| 2 | Australia | 2 | 1 | 1 | 3 | 3 | 4 | 0.750 | 56 | 78 | 0.718 | 1st–12th pools |
| 3 | Chile | 2 | 0 | 2 | 2 | 1 | 6 | 0.167 | 38 | 95 | 0.400 | 13th–23rd pools |

| Date | | Score | | Set 1 | Set 2 | Set 3 | Set 4 | Set 5 | Total |
|---|---|---|---|---|---|---|---|---|---|
| 13 Sep | Soviet Union | 3–0 | Australia | 15–4 | 15–1 | 15–1 | | | 45–6 |
| 14 Sep | Soviet Union | 3–0 | Chile | 15–3 | 15–1 | 15–1 | | | 45–5 |
| 15 Sep | Australia | 3–1 | Chile | 15–7 | 15–6 | 5–15 | 15–5 | | 50–33 |

==== Pool E ====
Location: Arequipa

| Pos | Team | Pld | W | L | Pts | SW | SL | SR | SPW | SPL | SPR | Qualification |
|---|---|---|---|---|---|---|---|---|---|---|---|---|
| 1 | South Korea | 3 | 3 | 0 | 6 | 9 | 1 | 9.000 | 148 | 67 | 2.209 | 1st–12th pools |
| 2 | Brazil | 3 | 2 | 1 | 5 | 7 | 3 | 2.333 | 136 | 98 | 1.388 | 1st–12th pools |
| 3 | West Germany | 3 | 1 | 2 | 4 | 3 | 6 | 0.500 | 94 | 113 | 0.832 | 13th–23rd pools |
| 4 | Paraguay | 3 | 0 | 3 | 3 | 0 | 9 | 0.000 | 35 | 135 | 0.259 | 13th–23rd pools |

| Date | | Score | | Set 1 | Set 2 | Set 3 | Set 4 | Set 5 | Total |
|---|---|---|---|---|---|---|---|---|---|
| 13 Sep | Brazil | 3–0 | Paraguay | 15–1 | 15–1 | 15–7 | | | 45–9 |
| 13 Sep | South Korea | 3–0 | West Germany | 15–8 | 15–4 | 15–6 | | | 45–18 |
| 14 Sep | West Germany | 0–3 | Brazil | 16–18 | 7–15 | 8–15 | | | 31–48 |
| 14 Sep | South Korea | 3–0 | Paraguay | 15–1 | 15–2 | 15–3 | | | 45–6 |
| 15 Sep | West Germany | 3–0 | Paraguay | 15–10 | 15–4 | 15–6 | | | 45–20 |
| 15 Sep | South Korea | 3–1 | Brazil | 15–13 | 13–15 | 15–12 | 15–3 | | 58–43 |

==== Pool F ====
Location: Chiclayo

| Pos | Team | Pld | W | L | Pts | SW | SL | SR | SPW | SPL | SPR | Qualification |
|---|---|---|---|---|---|---|---|---|---|---|---|---|
| 1 | United States | 3 | 3 | 0 | 6 | 9 | 0 | MAX | 135 | 56 | 2.411 | 1st–12th pools |
| 2 | China | 3 | 2 | 1 | 5 | 6 | 3 | 2.000 | 116 | 62 | 1.871 | 1st–12th pools |
| 3 | Italy | 3 | 1 | 2 | 4 | 3 | 6 | 0.500 | 67 | 118 | 0.568 | 13th–23rd pools |
| 4 | Puerto Rico | 3 | 0 | 3 | 3 | 0 | 9 | 0.000 | 53 | 135 | 0.393 | 13th–23rd pools |

| Date | | Score | | Set 1 | Set 2 | Set 3 | Set 4 | Set 5 | Total |
|---|---|---|---|---|---|---|---|---|---|
| 13 Sep | China | 3–0 | Puerto Rico | 15–0 | 15–1 | 15–8 | | | 45–9 |
| 13 Sep | United States | 3–0 | Italy | 15–4 | 15–5 | 15–5 | | | 45–14 |
| 14 Sep | China | 3–0 | Italy | 15–3 | 15–1 | 15–4 | | | 45–8 |
| 14 Sep | United States | 3–0 | Puerto Rico | 15–5 | 15–7 | 15–4 | | | 45–16 |
| 15 Sep | Italy | 3–0 | Puerto Rico | 15–12 | 15–12 | 15–4 | | | 45–28 |
| 15 Sep | United States | 3–0 | China | 15–6 | 15–9 | 15–11 | | | 45–26 |

=== Second round ===
The results and the points of the matches between the same teams that were already played during the first round are taken into account for the second round.

==== 1st–12th pools ====
===== Pool G =====
Location: Lima

| Pos | Team | Pld | W | L | Pts | SW | SL | SR | SPW | SPL | SPR | Qualification |
|---|---|---|---|---|---|---|---|---|---|---|---|---|
| 1 | Japan | 5 | 4 | 1 | 9 | 13 | 3 | 4.333 | 210 | 114 | 1.842 | Finals |
| 2 | Peru | 5 | 4 | 1 | 9 | 12 | 4 | 3.000 | 224 | 142 | 1.577 | Finals |
| 3 | South Korea | 5 | 4 | 1 | 9 | 12 | 4 | 3.000 | 202 | 154 | 1.312 | 5th–8th places |
| 4 | Brazil | 5 | 2 | 3 | 7 | 7 | 11 | 0.636 | 197 | 224 | 0.879 | 5th–8th places |
| 5 | Bulgaria | 5 | 1 | 4 | 6 | 4 | 14 | 0.286 | 154 | 250 | 0.616 | 9th–12th places |
| 6 | Canada | 5 | 0 | 5 | 5 | 3 | 15 | 0.200 | 149 | 252 | 0.591 | 9th–12th places |

| Date | | Score | | Set 1 | Set 2 | Set 3 | Set 4 | Set 5 | Total |
|---|---|---|---|---|---|---|---|---|---|
| 18 Sep | Canada | 0–3 | South Korea | 8–15 | 2–15 | 4–15 | | | 14–45 |
| 18 Sep | Japan | 3–0 | Brazil | 15–5 | 15–10 | 15–9 | | | 45–24 |
| 18 Sep | Peru | 3–0 | Bulgaria | 15–10 | 15–8 | 15–12 | | | 45–30 |
| 19 Sep | Bulgaria | 1–3 | Brazil | 6–15 | 15–13 | 12–15 | 4–15 | | 37–58 |
| 19 Sep | Canada | 0–3 | Japan | 5–15 | 9–15 | 9–15 | | | 23–45 |
| 19 Sep | Peru | 0–3 | South Korea | 14–16 | 11–15 | 12–15 | | | 37–46 |
| 20 Sep | Bulgaria | 3–2 | Canada | 10–15 | 10–15 | 15–12 | 15–5 | 15–10 | 65–57 |
| 20 Sep | South Korea | 0–3 | Japan | 0–15 | 3–15 | 5–15 | | | 8–45 |
| 20 Sep | Peru | 3–0 | Brazil | 15–10 | 15–4 | 15–6 | | | 45–20 |
| 21 Sep | South Korea | 3–0 | Bulgaria | 15–6 | 15–4 | 15–5 | | | 45–15 |
| 21 Sep | Brazil | 3–1 | Canada | 15–10 | 15–12 | 7–15 | 15–2 | | 52–39 |
| 21 Sep | Peru | 3–1 | Japan | 15–4 | 15–5 | 7–15 | 15–10 | | 52–34 |

===== Pool H =====
Location: Trujillo

| Pos | Team | Pld | W | L | Pts | SW | SL | SR | SPW | SPL | SPR | Qualification |
|---|---|---|---|---|---|---|---|---|---|---|---|---|
| 1 | United States | 5 | 4 | 1 | 9 | 14 | 3 | 4.667 | 243 | 150 | 1.620 | Finals |
| 2 | China | 5 | 4 | 1 | 9 | 12 | 3 | 4.000 | 206 | 102 | 2.020 | Finals |
| 3 | Cuba | 5 | 4 | 1 | 9 | 12 | 6 | 2.000 | 221 | 188 | 1.176 | 5th–8th places |
| 4 | Soviet Union | 5 | 2 | 3 | 7 | 6 | 9 | 0.667 | 166 | 166 | 1.000 | 5th–8th places |
| 5 | Hungary | 5 | 1 | 4 | 6 | 4 | 12 | 0.333 | 149 | 200 | 0.745 | 9th–12th places |
| 6 | Australia | 5 | 0 | 5 | 5 | 0 | 15 | 0.000 | 46 | 225 | 0.204 | 9th–12th places |

| Date | | Score | | Set 1 | Set 2 | Set 3 | Set 4 | Set 5 | Total |
|---|---|---|---|---|---|---|---|---|---|
| 18 Sep | Hungary | 3–0 | Australia | 15–6 | 15–0 | 15–7 | | | 45–13 |
| 18 Sep | Cuba | 0–3 | China | 8–15 | 9–15 | 2–15 | | | 19–45 |
| 18 Sep | Soviet Union | 0–3 | United States | 6–15 | 6–15 | 13–15 | | | 25–45 |
| 19 Sep | Hungary | 0–3 | China | 2–15 | 7–15 | 2–15 | | | 11–45 |
| 19 Sep | Australia | 0–3 | United States | 0–15 | 3–15 | 3–15 | | | 6–45 |
| 19 Sep | Cuba | 3–0 | Soviet Union | 15–10 | 15–10 | 15–10 | | | 45–30 |
| 20 Sep | Hungary | 0–3 | United States | 5–15 | 14–16 | 13–15 | | | 32–46 |
| 20 Sep | China | 3–0 | Soviet Union | 15–6 | 15–3 | 15–12 | | | 45–21 |
| 20 Sep | Australia | 0–3 | Cuba | 6–15 | 2–15 | 7–15 | | | 15–45 |
| 21 Sep | Hungary | 0–3 | Soviet Union | 7–15 | 8–15 | 10–15 | | | 25–45 |
| 21 Sep | United States | 2–3 | Cuba | 15–5 | 10–15 | 10–15 | 15–11 | 12–15 | 62–61 |
| 21 Sep | Australia | 0–3 | China | 2–15 | 2–15 | 2–15 | | | 6–45 |

==== 13th–23rd pools ====
===== Pool I =====
Location: Arequipa

| Pos | Team | Pld | W | L | Pts | SW | SL | SR | SPW | SPL | SPR | Qualification |
|---|---|---|---|---|---|---|---|---|---|---|---|---|
| 1 | Mexico | 5 | 5 | 0 | 10 | 15 | 0 | MAX | 225 | 69 | 3.261 | 13th–16th places |
| 2 | West Germany | 5 | 4 | 1 | 9 | 12 | 3 | 4.000 | 204 | 106 | 1.925 | 13th–16th places |
| 3 | Paraguay | 5 | 3 | 2 | 8 | 9 | 7 | 1.286 | 175 | 159 | 1.101 | 17th–20th places |
| 4 | Spain | 5 | 2 | 3 | 7 | 7 | 9 | 0.778 | 155 | 191 | 0.812 | 17th–20th places |
| 5 | Indonesia | 5 | 1 | 4 | 6 | 3 | 12 | 0.250 | 136 | 201 | 0.677 | 21st–23rd places |
| 6 | Nigeria | 5 | 0 | 5 | 5 | 0 | 15 | 0.000 | 56 | 225 | 0.249 | 21st–23rd places |

| Date | | Score | | Set 1 | Set 2 | Set 3 | Set 4 | Set 5 | Total |
|---|---|---|---|---|---|---|---|---|---|
| 18 Sep | West Germany | 3–0 | Spain | 15–0 | 15–5 | 15–3 | | | 45–8 |
| 18 Sep | Paraguay | 3–0 | Indonesia | 15–6 | 15–2 | 15–13 | | | 45–21 |
| 18 Sep | Mexico | 3–0 | Nigeria | 15–1 | 15–0 | 15–3 | | | 45–4 |
| 19 Sep | West Germany | 3–0 | Indonesia | 15–13 | 15–7 | 15–8 | | | 45–28 |
| 19 Sep | Spain | 3–0 | Nigeria | 15–6 | 15–3 | 15–6 | | | 45–15 |
| 19 Sep | Paraguay | 0–3 | Mexico | 4–15 | 4–15 | 2–15 | | | 10–45 |
| 20 Sep | West Germany | 3–0 | Nigeria | 15–0 | 15–1 | 15–4 | | | 45–5 |
| 20 Sep | Mexico | 3–0 | Indonesia | 15–1 | 15–9 | 15–1 | | | 45–11 |
| 20 Sep | Spain | 1–3 | Paraguay | 15–10 | 12–15 | 10–15 | 0–15 | | 37–55 |
| 21 Sep | West Germany | 0–3 | Mexico | 6–15 | 10–15 | 8–15 | | | 24–45 |
| 21 Sep | Spain | 3–0 | Indonesia | 15–12 | 15–7 | 15–12 | | | 45–31 |
| 21 Sep | Nigeria | 0–3 | Paraguay | 1–15 | 2–15 | 8–15 | | | 11–45 |

===== Pool J =====
Location: Ica

| Pos | Team | Pld | W | L | Pts | SW | SL | SR | SPW | SPL | SPR | Qualification |
|---|---|---|---|---|---|---|---|---|---|---|---|---|
| 1 | Netherlands | 4 | 4 | 0 | 8 | 12 | 2 | 6.000 | 204 | 127 | 1.606 | 13th–16th places |
| 2 | Italy | 4 | 3 | 1 | 7 | 11 | 3 | 3.667 | 206 | 148 | 1.392 | 13th–16th places |
| 3 | Argentina | 4 | 2 | 2 | 6 | 6 | 8 | 0.750 | 175 | 177 | 0.989 | 17th–20th places |
| 4 | Puerto Rico | 4 | 1 | 3 | 5 | 5 | 8 | 0.625 | 176 | 208 | 0.846 | 17th–20th places |
| 5 | Chile | 4 | 0 | 4 | 4 | 1 | 12 | 0.083 | 93 | 194 | 0.479 | 21st–23rd places |

| Date | | Score | | Set 1 | Set 2 | Set 3 | Set 4 | Set 5 | Total |
|---|---|---|---|---|---|---|---|---|---|
| 18 Sep | Chile | 0–3 | Netherlands | 1–15 | 6–15 | 7–15 | | | 14–45 |
| 18 Sep | Argentina | 3–2 | Puerto Rico | 15–5 | 13–15 | 16–18 | 15–10 | 15–13 | 74–61 |
| 19 Sep | Chile | 0–3 | Italy | 0–15 | 2–15 | 12–15 | | | 14–45 |
| 19 Sep | Netherlands | 3–0 | Puerto Rico | 15–13 | 15–13 | 15–2 | | | 45–28 |
| 20 Sep | Chile | 1–3 | Puerto Rico | 6–15 | 9–15 | 15–13 | 14–16 | | 44–59 |
| 20 Sep | Italy | 3–1 | Argentina | 15–8 | 15–12 | 5–15 | 15–2 | | 50–37 |
| 21 Sep | Chile | 0–3 | Argentina | 8–15 | 1–15 | 12–15 | | | 21–45 |
| 21 Sep | Italy | 2–3 | Netherlands | 9–15 | 13–15 | 15–12 | 15–11 | 14–16 | 66–69 |

=== Final round ===
==== 21st–23rd places ====
21st–23rd semifinals
Indonesia
Bye
24 September – Lima
Chile | 3
Nigeria | 1

21st place
25 September – Lima
Indonesia | 3
Chile | 2

===== 21st–23rd semifinals =====
| Date | | Score | | Set 1 | Set 2 | Set 3 | Set 4 | Set 5 | Total |
|---|---|---|---|---|---|---|---|---|---|
| 24 Sep | Chile | 3–1 | Nigeria | 15–10 | 15–1 | 11–15 | 15–3 | | 56–29 |

===== 21st place match =====
| Date | | Score | | Set 1 | Set 2 | Set 3 | Set 4 | Set 5 | Total |
|---|---|---|---|---|---|---|---|---|---|
| 25 Sep | Indonesia | 3–2 | Chile | 6–15 | 15–7 | 8–15 | 15–4 | 17–15 | 61–56 |

==== 17th–20th places ====
17th–20th semifinals
24 September – Trujillo
Paraguay | 1
Puerto Rico | 3
24 September – Trujillo
Argentina | 3
Spain | 2

17th place
25 September – Trujillo
Puerto Rico | 3
Argentina | 2
19th place
25 September – Trujillo
Paraguay | 3
Spain | 1

===== 17th–20th semifinals =====
| Date | | Score | | Set 1 | Set 2 | Set 3 | Set 4 | Set 5 | Total |
|---|---|---|---|---|---|---|---|---|---|
| 24 Sep | Paraguay | 1–3 | Puerto Rico | 14–16 | 15–4 | 8–15 | 10–15 | | 47–50 |
| 24 Sep | Argentina | 3–2 | Spain | 15–6 | 13–15 | 15–7 | 12–15 | 15–4 | 70–47 |

===== 19th place match =====
| Date | | Score | | Set 1 | Set 2 | Set 3 | Set 4 | Set 5 | Total |
|---|---|---|---|---|---|---|---|---|---|
| 25 Sep | Paraguay | 3–1 | Spain | 14–16 | 15–7 | 15–11 | 15–10 | | 59–44 |

===== 17th place match =====
| Date | | Score | | Set 1 | Set 2 | Set 3 | Set 4 | Set 5 | Total |
|---|---|---|---|---|---|---|---|---|---|
| 25 Sep | Puerto Rico | 3–2 | Argentina | 15–10 | 9–15 | 5–15 | 15–12 | 15–5 | 59–57 |

==== 13th–16th places ====
13th–16th semifinals
24 September – Arequipa
Mexico | 3
Italy | 2
24 September – Arequipa
Netherlands | 0
West Germany | 3

13th place
25 September – Arequipa
Mexico | 3
West Germany | 2
15th place
25 September – Arequipa
Italy | 3
Netherlands | 2

===== 13th–16th semifinals =====
| Date | | Score | | Set 1 | Set 2 | Set 3 | Set 4 | Set 5 | Total |
|---|---|---|---|---|---|---|---|---|---|
| 24 Sep | Mexico | 3–2 | Italy | 12–15 | 15–11 | 11–15 | 15–8 | 15–12 | 68–61 |
| 24 Sep | Netherlands | 0–3 | West Germany | 6–15 | 2–15 | 5–15 | | | 13–45 |

===== 15th place match =====
| Date | | Score | | Set 1 | Set 2 | Set 3 | Set 4 | Set 5 | Total |
|---|---|---|---|---|---|---|---|---|---|
| 25 Sep | Italy | 3–2 | Netherlands | 17–15 | 13–15 | 15–12 | 8–15 | 15–10 | 68–67 |

===== 13th place match =====
| Date | | Score | | Set 1 | Set 2 | Set 3 | Set 4 | Set 5 | Total |
|---|---|---|---|---|---|---|---|---|---|
| 25 Sep | Mexico | 3–2 | West Germany | 9–15 | 15–12 | 15–12 | 4–15 | 15–13 | 58–67 |

==== 9th–12th places ====
9th–12th semifinals
24 September – Ica
Bulgaria | 3
Australia | 0
24 September – Ica
Hungary | 3
Canada | 0

9th place
25 September – Ica
Bulgaria | 3
Hungary | 2
11th place
25 September – Ica
Australia | 0
Canada | 3

===== 9th–12th semifinals =====
| Date | | Score | | Set 1 | Set 2 | Set 3 | Set 4 | Set 5 | Total |
|---|---|---|---|---|---|---|---|---|---|
| 24 Sep | Bulgaria | 3–0 | Australia | 15–5 | 15–4 | 15–3 | | | 45–12 |
| 24 Sep | Hungary | 3–0 | Canada | 15–11 | 15–10 | 15–8 | | | 45–29 |

===== 11th place match =====
| Date | | Score | | Set 1 | Set 2 | Set 3 | Set 4 | Set 5 | Total |
|---|---|---|---|---|---|---|---|---|---|
| 25 Sep | Australia | 0–3 | Canada | 7–15 | 7–15 | 7–15 | | | 21–45 |

===== 9th place match =====
| Date | | Score | | Set 1 | Set 2 | Set 3 | Set 4 | Set 5 | Total |
|---|---|---|---|---|---|---|---|---|---|
| 25 Sep | Bulgaria | 3–2 | Hungary | 9–15 | 15–6 | 13–15 | 15–10 | 15–9 | 67–55 |

==== 5th–8th places ====
5th–8th semifinals
24 September – Lima
South Korea | 0
Soviet Union | 3
24 September – Lima
Cuba | 3
Brazil | 2

5th place
25 September – Lima
Soviet Union | 2
Cuba | 3
7th place
25 September – Lima
South Korea | 3
Brazil | 0

===== 5th–8th semifinals =====
| Date | | Score | | Set 1 | Set 2 | Set 3 | Set 4 | Set 5 | Total |
|---|---|---|---|---|---|---|---|---|---|
| 24 Sep | South Korea | 0–3 | Soviet Union | 13–15 | 9–15 | 10–15 | | | 32–45 |
| 24 Sep | Cuba | 3–2 | Brazil | 15–6 | 10–15 | 15–6 | 12–15 | 15–10 | 67–52 |

===== 7th place match =====
| Date | | Score | | Set 1 | Set 2 | Set 3 | Set 4 | Set 5 | Total |
|---|---|---|---|---|---|---|---|---|---|
| 25 Sep | South Korea | 3–0 | Brazil | 15–11 | 19–17 | 15–10 | | | 49–38 |

===== 5th place match =====
| Date | | Score | | Set 1 | Set 2 | Set 3 | Set 4 | Set 5 | Total |
|---|---|---|---|---|---|---|---|---|---|
| 25 Sep | Soviet Union | 2–3 | Cuba | 4–15 | 15–9 | 15–7 | 6–15 | 12–15 | 52–61 |

==== Finals ====
Semifinals
24 September – Lima
Japan | 0
China | 3
24 September – Lima
United States | 0
Peru | 3

Final
25 September – Lima
China | 3
Peru | 0
3rd place
25 September – Lima
Japan | 1
United States | 3

===== Semifinals =====
| Date | | Score | | Set 1 | Set 2 | Set 3 | Set 4 | Set 5 | Total |
|---|---|---|---|---|---|---|---|---|---|
| 24 Sep | Japan | 0–3 | China | 8–15 | 7–15 | 6–15 | | | 21–45 |
| 24 Sep | United States | 0–3 | Peru | 12–15 | 12–15 | 10–15 | | | 34–45 |

===== 3rd place match =====
| Date | | Score | | Set 1 | Set 2 | Set 3 | Set 4 | Set 5 | Total |
|---|---|---|---|---|---|---|---|---|---|
| 25 Sep | Japan | 1–3 | United States | 5–15 | 15–2 | 8–15 | 6–15 | | 34–47 |

===== Final =====
| Date | | Score | | Set 1 | Set 2 | Set 3 | Set 4 | Set 5 | Total |
|---|---|---|---|---|---|---|---|---|---|
| 25 Sep | China | 3–0 | Peru | 15–1 | 15–5 | 15–11 | | | 45–17 |

== Final standing ==
| Rank | Team |
|---|---|
| 1st place, gold medalist(s) | China |
| 2nd place, silver medalist(s) | Peru |
| 3rd place, bronze medalist(s) | United States |
| 4 | Japan |
| 5 | Cuba |
| 6 | Soviet Union |
| 7 | South Korea |
| 8 | Brazil |
| 9 | Bulgaria |
| 10 | Hungary |
| 11 | Canada |
| 12 | Australia |
| 13 | Mexico |
| 14 | West Germany |
| 15 | Italy |
| 16 | Netherlands |
| 17 | Puerto Rico |
| 18 | Argentina |
| 19 | Paraguay |
| 20 | Spain |
| 21 | Indonesia |
| 22 | Chile |
| 23 | Nigeria |

| Qualified for the 1984 Olympic Games as hosts |
| Qualified for the 1984 Olympic Games |

1982 Women's World champions

China
1st title

Team roster
Lang Ping, Liang Yan, Cao Huiying, Yang Xi, Zhou Xiaolan, Yang Xilan, Chen Yaqiong, Jiang Ying, Sun Jinfang (c), Chen Zhaodi, Zheng Meizhu, Zhang Rongfang
Head coach
Yuan Weimin

== Awards ==
- Most valuable player
  (China) Lang Ping
- Best spiker
  (Peru) Denisse Fajardo
