= Cao Huiying =

Chinese volleyball player (born 1954)

Personal information
- Full name: 曹慧英
- Born: 1954 (age 71–72); Luannan County, China
- Height: 180 cm (5 ft 11 in)

Volleyball information
- Position: Middle blocker
- Number: 1 (1981); 3 (1982)

National team
1978–1982	China
Honours
Women's volleyball
Representing China
World Championship
Gold medal – first place	1982 Peru
FIVB World Cup
Gold medal – first place	1981 Japan
Asian Games
Gold medal – first place	1982 New Delhi	Team
Silver medal – second place	1978 Bangkok	Team

Cao Huiying (Chinese: 曹慧英, born 1954, in Luannan County) is a Chinese former volleyball player. She was a member of the Chinese national team that won gold at both the 1981 FIVB Women's World Cup and the 1982 FIVB Women's World Championship. She also won a gold medal at the 1982 Asian Games, after which she retired.

Cao was the first ever captain for the Chinese women's team. She played for China with tuberculosis, a knee injury, and only seven healthy fingers.

== Individual awards ==
- Best blocker, 1977 FIVB Volleyball Women's World Cup
- Spirit of fight, 1977 FIVB Volleyball Women's World Cup
