= 1981 FIVB Volleyball Women's World Cup =

International athletics championship event

1981 Women's World Cup
Tournament details
- Host country: Japan
- Dates: 6–16 November
- Teams: 8
- Venue: (in 1 host city)

Final positions
- Champions: China (1st title)

Tournament awards
- MVP: (China) Sun Jinfang

The 1981 FIVB Women's World Cup was held from 6 to 16 November 1981 in Osaka, Japan.

== Teams ==
Teams	Continents
Japan	Host country
China	Asia
South Korea	Asia
Soviet Union	Europe
Bulgaria	Europe
Cuba	Americas
Brazil	Americas
United States	Americas

== Results ==
Pos	Team	Pld	W	L	Pts	SW	SL	SR	SPW	SPL	SPR
1	China	7	7	0	14	21	4	5.250	364	216	1.685
2	Japan	7	5	2	12	19	7	2.714	361	246	1.467
3	Soviet Union	7	5	2	12	15	7	2.143	267	235	1.136
4	United States	7	5	2	12	17	9	1.889	335	280	1.196
5	South Korea	7	3	4	10	9	14	0.643	265	281	0.943
6	Cuba	7	2	5	9	10	16	0.625	294	332	0.886
7	Bulgaria	7	1	6	8	5	19	0.263	198	335	0.591
8	Brazil	7	0	7	7	1	21	0.048	166	325	0.511

Date		Score		Set 1	Set 2	Set 3	Set 4	Set 5	Total
6 Nov	China	3–0	Brazil	15–4	15–5	15–3			45–12
6 Nov	Japan	3–0	Soviet Union	15–1	15–5	15–3			45–9
6 Nov	Cuba	3–1	Bulgaria	12–15	16–14	15–12	15–5		58–46
6 Nov	United States	3–0	South Korea	15–8	15–12	15–6			45–26
8 Nov	China	3–0	Soviet Union	15–4	16–14	15–0			46–18
8 Nov	Japan	3–0	South Korea	15–8	15–11	15–7			45–26
8 Nov	Cuba	3–0	Brazil	15–6	15–5	15–10			45–21
8 Nov	United States	3–0	Bulgaria	15–3	15–9	15–3			45–15
10 Nov	United States	3–1	Cuba	15–11	15–5	7–15	15–3		52–34
10 Nov	Japan	3–0	Bulgaria	15–1	15–7	15–3			45–11
10 Nov	Soviet Union	3–0	Brazil	15–8	15–5	15–5			45–18
10 Nov	China	3–0	South Korea	15–12	15–9	15–8			45–29
11 Nov	China	3–0	Bulgaria	15–6	15–3	15–6			45–15
11 Nov	Soviet Union	3–0	South Korea	15–11	15–6	16–14			46–31
11 Nov	United States	3–0	Brazil	15–4	15–12	15–10			45–26
11 Nov	Japan	3–1	Cuba	15–13	14–16	15–6	15–5		59–40
13 Nov	United States	3–2	Japan	15–10	11–15	15–13	12–15	15–9	68–62
13 Nov	South Korea	3–0	Brazil	15–5	15–6	15–13			45–24
13 Nov	Soviet Union	3–1	Bulgaria	15–11	15–11	13–15	15–5		58–42
13 Nov	China	3–0	Cuba	15–4	15–13	15–9			45–26
15 Nov	China	3–2	United States	15–8	13–15	15–11	14–16	15–6	72–56
15 Nov	Japan	3–0	Brazil	15–3	15–10	15–13			45–26
15 Nov	South Korea	3–0	Bulgaria	15–5	15–6	15–3			45–14
15 Nov	Soviet Union	3–0	Cuba	15–8	16–14	15–7			46–29
16 Nov	Bulgaria	3–1	Brazil	10–15	15–8	15–7	15–9		55–39
16 Nov	South Korea	3–2	Cuba	11–15	7–15	15–10	15–11	15–11	63–62
16 Nov	Soviet Union	3–0	United States	15–11	15–4	15–9			45–24
16 Nov	China	3–2	Japan	15–8	15–7	12–15	7–15	17–15	66–60

== Final standing ==
Rank	Team
1st place, gold medalist(s)	China
2nd place, silver medalist(s)	Japan
3rd place, bronze medalist(s)	Soviet Union
4	United States
5	South Korea
6	Cuba
7	Bulgaria
8	Brazil

1981 Women's World Cup champions

China
1st title

Team roster
Cao Huiying, Liang Yan, Lang Ping, Zhou Xiaolan, Yang Xi, Sun Jinfang (c), Chen Zhaodi, Zhou Lumin, Zhu Ling, Chen Yaqiong, Zhang Rongfang, Zhang Jieyun
Head coach
Yuan Weimin

== Awards ==
- Most valuable player
  (China) Sun Jinfang
- Best attacker
  (United States) Flo Hyman
- Best blocker
  (Soviet Union) Yelena Akhaminova
- Best setter
  (China) Sun Jinfang
- Best server
  (Japan) Rieko Mizuhara
- Best defender
  (Japan) Miyoko Hirose
- Best Coach
  (China) Yuan Weimin
- Spirit of fight
  (Cuba) Mercedez Pérez
