= 2018 AVC Men's Challenge Cup =

Asian men's volleyball tournament

Tournament details
- Host country: Sri Lanka
- City: Colombo
- Dates: 15–21 September
- Teams: 8 (from 1 confederation)
- Venue: 1

Final positions
- Champions: Iraq (1st title)
- Runners-up: Saudi Arabia
- Third place: Sri Lanka
- Fourth place: Bangladesh

Tournament awards
- MVP: (Saudi Arabia) Ahmed Albakheet

The 2018 AVC Men's Challenge Cup was the inaugural edition of the AVC Challenge Cup, a biennial international volleyball tournament organised by the Asian Volleyball Confederation (AVC) and that year with the Sri Lanka Volleyball Federation (SLVF). The tournament was held in Colombo, Sri Lanka from 15 to 21 September 2018.

== Team ==
=== Qualification ===
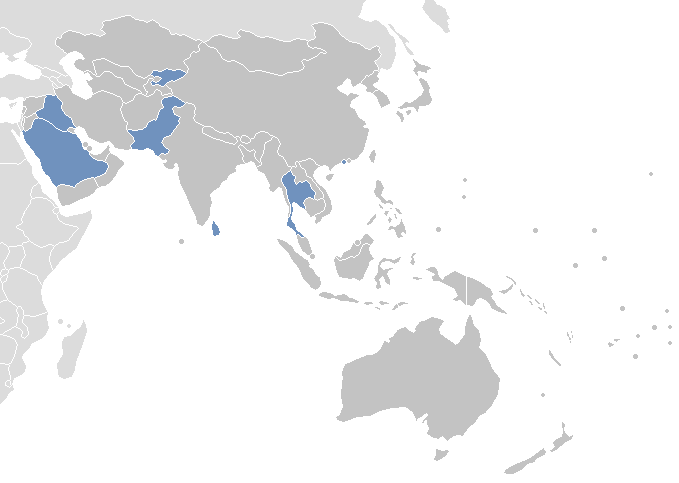
Qualified

8 AVC member associations qualified for the 2018 AVC Men's Challenge Cup. Sri Lanka qualified as hosts and the 3 teams were qualified from the 2017 Asian Men's Volleyball Championship while 4 teams were new entrants. The 8 AVC member associations were from 4 zonal associations, including Central Asia (2 teams), East Asia (2 team), Southeast Asia (1 team), and Western Asia (3 teams). Fiji and Uzbekistan withdrew from the tournament.

=== Qualified teams ===
The following teams qualified for the tournament.

| Means of qualification | Births | Qualified |
|---|---|---|
| Host country | 1 | Sri Lanka |
| Central Asian teams | 1 | Bangladesh |
| Central Asian teams | 1 | ~~Uzbekistan~~ |
| East Asian teams | 2 | Hong Kong |
| East Asian teams | 2 | Mongolia |
| Oceanian teams | 0 | ~~Fiji~~ |
| Southeast Asian teams | 1 | Malaysia |
| West Asian teams | 3 | Iraq |
| West Asian teams | 3 | Saudi Arabia |
| West Asian teams | 3 | United Arab Emirates |
| Total | 8 | |

== Pools composition ==
The following teams qualified for the tournament.

| Pool A | Pool B |
|---|---|
| Sri Lanka (Hosts) | United Arab Emirates |
| Malaysia | Bangladesh |
| Hong Kong (16) | Iraq (13) |
| Saudi Arabia (15) | Mongolia |

== Preliminary round ==
=== Pool standing procedure ===
1. Number of matches won
2. Match points
3. Sets ratio
4. Points ratio
5. Result of the last match between the tied teams

Match won 3–0 or 3–1: 3 match points for the winner, 0 match points for the loser
Match won 3–2: 2 match points for the winner, 1 match point for the loser

=== Pool A ===
| Pos | Team | Pld | W | L | Pts | SW | SL | SR | SPW | SPL | SPR | Qualification |
|---|---|---|---|---|---|---|---|---|---|---|---|---|
| 1 | Saudi Arabia | 3 | 3 | 0 | 9 | 9 | 3 | 3.000 | 287 | 240 | 1.196 | Quarterfinals |
| 2 | Sri Lanka (H) | 3 | 2 | 1 | 6 | 7 | 3 | 2.333 | 236 | 211 | 1.118 | Quarterfinals |
| 3 | Malaysia | 3 | 1 | 2 | 3 | 4 | 6 | 0.667 | 211 | 234 | 0.902 | Quarterfinals |
| 4 | Hong Kong | 3 | 0 | 3 | 0 | 1 | 9 | 0.111 | 203 | 252 | 0.806 | Quarterfinals |

Rules for classification: Pool standing procedure
(H) Host

| 15 September; 16:00 | Sri Lanka | 3–0 | Hong Kong | Sugathadasa Indoor Stadium, Colombo |
| 15 September; 16:00 | (25–15, 25–20, 25–22); P2 Report | | | Sugathadasa Indoor Stadium, Colombo |

| 15 September; 18:30 | Malaysia | 1–3 | Saudi Arabia | Sugathadasa Indoor Stadium, Colombo |
| 15 September; 18:30 | (17–25, 15–25, 25–18, 17–25); P2 Report | | | Sugathadasa Indoor Stadium, Colombo |

| 16 September; 16:00 | Sri Lanka | 3–0 | Malaysia | Sugathadasa Indoor Stadium, Colombo |
| 16 September; 16:00 | (25–16, 25–18, 25–23); P2 Report | | | Sugathadasa Indoor Stadium, Colombo |

| 16 September; 18:30 | Hong Kong | 1–3 | Saudi Arabia | Sugathadasa Indoor Stadium, Colombo |
| 16 September; 18:30 | (18–25, 25–22, 22–25, 15–25); P2 Report | | | Sugathadasa Indoor Stadium, Colombo |

| 17 September; 16:00 | Malaysia | 3–0 | Hong Kong | Sugathadasa Indoor Stadium, Colombo |
| 17 September; 16:00 | (30–28, 25–19, 25–19); P2 Report | | | Sugathadasa Indoor Stadium, Colombo |

| 17 September; 18:30 | Saudi Arabia | 3–1 | Sri Lanka | Sugathadasa Indoor Stadium, Colombo |
| 17 September; 18:30 | (22–25, 25–22, 25–19, 25–20); P2 Report | | | Sugathadasa Indoor Stadium, Colombo |

=== Pool B ===
| Pos | Team | Pld | W | L | Pts | SW | SL | SR | SPW | SPL | SPR | Qualification |
|---|---|---|---|---|---|---|---|---|---|---|---|---|
| 1 | Bangladesh | 3 | 2 | 1 | 7 | 8 | 4 | 2.000 | 267 | 251 | 1.064 | Quarterfinals |
| 2 | Iraq | 3 | 2 | 1 | 6 | 8 | 5 | 1.600 | 281 | 259 | 1.085 | Quarterfinals |
| 3 | United Arab Emirates | 3 | 2 | 1 | 5 | 6 | 6 | 1.000 | 269 | 272 | 0.989 | Quarterfinals |
| 4 | Mongolia | 3 | 0 | 3 | 0 | 2 | 9 | 0.222 | 239 | 274 | 0.872 | Quarterfinals |

Updated to match(es) played on unknown. Source:
Rules for classification: Pool standing procedure

| 15 September; 10:00 | Bangladesh | 2–3 | Iraq | Sugathadasa Indoor Stadium, Colombo |
| 15 September; 10:00 | (25–20, 18–25, 17–25, 25–21, 9–15); P2 Report | | | Sugathadasa Indoor Stadium, Colombo |

| 15 September; 13:30 | United Arab Emirates | 3–1 | Mongolia | Sugathadasa Indoor Stadium, Colombo |
| 15 September; 13:30 | (31–29, 25–22, 20–25, 25–21); P2 Report | | | Sugathadasa Indoor Stadium, Colombo |

| 16 September; 10:00 | United Arab Emirates | 0–3 | Bangladesh | Sugathadasa Indoor Stadium, Colombo |
| 16 September; 10:00 | (22–25, 16–25, 18–25); P2 Report | | | Sugathadasa Indoor Stadium, Colombo |

| 16 September; 13:30 | Mongolia | 0–3 | Iraq | Sugathadasa Indoor Stadium, Colombo |
| 16 September; 13:30 | (14–25, 20–25, 19–25); P2 Report | | | Sugathadasa Indoor Stadium, Colombo |

| 17 September; 10:00 | Iraq | 2–3 | United Arab Emirates | Sugathadasa Indoor Stadium, Colombo |
| 17 September; 10:00 | (18–25, 26–24, 25–23, 22–25, 9–15); P2 Report | | | Sugathadasa Indoor Stadium, Colombo |

| 17 September; 13:30 | Bangladesh | 3–1 | Mongolia | Sugathadasa Indoor Stadium, Colombo |
| 17 September; 13:30 | (25–22, 25–23, 23–25, 25–19); P2 Report | | | Sugathadasa Indoor Stadium, Colombo |

== Final round ==
=== Final eight ===
Quarterfinals
19 September – Colombo
Saudi Arabia | 3
Mongolia | 0
19 September – Colombo
Hong Kong | 0
Bangladesh | 3
19 September – Colombo
Sri Lanka | 3
United Arab Emirates | 0
19 September – Colombo
Malaysia | 1
Iraq | 3

Semifinals
20 September – Colombo
Saudi Arabia | 3
Bangladesh | 1
20 September – Colombo
Sri Lanka | 1
Iraq | 3

Final
21 September – Colombo
Saudi Arabia | 2
Iraq | 3
3rd place match
21 September – Colombo
Bangladesh | 0
Sri Lanka | 3

5th–8th semifinals
20 September – Colombo
Mongolia | 2
Hong Kong | 3
20 September – Colombo
United Arab Emirates | 3
Malaysia | 1

5th place match
21 September – Colombo
Hong Kong | 2
United Arab Emirates | 3
7th place match
21 September – Colombo
Mongolia | 0
Malaysia | 3

==== Quarterfinals ====
| 19 September; 10:00 | Saudi Arabia | 3–0 | Mongolia | Sugathadasa Indoor Stadium, Colombo |
| 19 September; 10:00 | (25–17, 25–17, 25–15); P2 Report | | | Sugathadasa Indoor Stadium, Colombo |

| 19 September; 13:30 | Malaysia | 1–3 | Iraq | Sugathadasa Indoor Stadium, Colombo |
| 19 September; 13:30 | (27–25, 21–25, 23–25, 20–25); P2 Report | | | Sugathadasa Indoor Stadium, Colombo |

| 19 September; 16:00 | Sri Lanka | 3–0 | United Arab Emirates | Sugathadasa Indoor Stadium, Colombo |
| 19 September; 16:00 | (25–20, 25–17, 25–15); P2 Report | | | Sugathadasa Indoor Stadium, Colombo |

| 19 September; 18:30 | Hong Kong | 0–3 | Bangladesh | Sugathadasa Indoor Stadium, Colombo |
| 19 September; 18:30 | (22–25, 21–25, 16–25); P2 Report | | | Sugathadasa Indoor Stadium, Colombo |

==== 5th–8th semifinals ====
| 20 September; 10:00 | Mongolia | 2–3 | Hong Kong | Sugathadasa Indoor Stadium, Colombo |
| 20 September; 10:00 | (21–25, 25–20, 26–24, 17–25, 10–15); P2 Report | | | Sugathadasa Indoor Stadium, Colombo |

| 20 September; 13:30 | United Arab Emirates | 3–1 | Malaysia | Sugathadasa Indoor Stadium, Colombo |
| 20 September; 13:30 | (21–25, 25–23, 36–34, 25–21); P2 Report | | | Sugathadasa Indoor Stadium, Colombo |

==== Semifinals ====
| 20 September; 16:00 | Sri Lanka | 1–3 | Iraq | Sugathadasa Indoor Stadium, Colombo |
| 20 September; 16:00 | (25–22, 24–26, 20–25, 20–25); P2 Report | | | Sugathadasa Indoor Stadium, Colombo |

| 20 September; 18:30 | Saudi Arabia | 3–1 | Bangladesh | Sugathadasa Indoor Stadium, Colombo |
| 20 September; 18:30 | (25–15, 21–25, 25–12, 26–24); P2 Report | | | Sugathadasa Indoor Stadium, Colombo |

==== 7th place match ====
| 21 September; 09:00 | Mongolia | 0–3 | Malaysia | Sugathadasa Indoor Stadium, Colombo |
| 21 September; 09:00 | (19–25, 30–32, 29–31); P2 Report | | | Sugathadasa Indoor Stadium, Colombo |

==== 5th place match ====
| 21 September; 11:00 | Hong Kong | 2–3 | United Arab Emirates | Sugathadasa Indoor Stadium, Colombo |
| 21 September; 11:00 | (25–21, 17–25, 25–22, 25–27, 7–15); P2 Report | | | Sugathadasa Indoor Stadium, Colombo |

==== 3rd place match ====
| 21 September; 13:30 | Sri Lanka | 3–0 | Bangladesh | Sugathadasa Indoor Stadium, Colombo |
| 21 September; 13:30 | (25–16, 25–17, 25–17); P2 Report | | | Sugathadasa Indoor Stadium, Colombo |

==== Final ====
| 21 September; 16:00 | Iraq | 3–2 | Saudi Arabia | Sugathadasa Indoor Stadium, Colombo |
| 21 September; 16:00 | (14–25, 25–14, 25–16, 26–28, 15–13); P2 Report | | | Sugathadasa Indoor Stadium, Colombo |

== Final standing ==
| Rank | Team |
|---|---|
| 1st place, gold medalist(s) | Iraq |
| 2nd place, silver medalist(s) | Saudi Arabia |
| 3rd place, bronze medalist(s) | Sri Lanka |
| 4 | Bangladesh |
| 5 | United Arab Emirates |
| 6 | Hong Kong |
| 7 | Malaysia |
| 8 | Mongolia |

2018 Asian Challenge Cup champions

Iraq
First title

14–man roster
Safaa Lafta Majeed (c), Hussain Nameer Shamil, Husam Abdulsamad, Mustafa Ghani Hussain, Mustafa Hameed Jabbar, Abbas Abdulkareem, Murtadha Zuhair Mohammed, Islam Sachit Challab, Aymen Ali Muslim, Falih Mohammed Saleh, Ali Lafta Majeed, Riyadh Azeez Mohammed, Ali Sahib Abushanan, Osama Munef Sabbar
Head coach
ALAA KHALAF A.

== Awards ==
- Most valuable player

(Saudi Arabia) Ahmed Albakheet

- Best outside spikers

(Sri Lanka) Deepthi Romesh
(Bangladesh) Horosit Biswas

- Best setter

(Iraq) Mustafa Haneed Jabbar

- Best opposite spiker

(Iraq) Hussain Nameer Shamil

- Best middle blocker

(Saudi Arabia) Ibrahim Majrashi
(Iraq) Islam Sachit Challab

- Best libero

(Sri Lanka) Lakmal Wijesekara

== See also ==
- 2018 Asian Men's Volleyball Cup
