= Yang Xi (volleyball) =

Chinese volleyball player

Personal information
- Nationality: Chinese
- Born: 1956 (age 69–70) Anxin County, Hebei, China
- Height: 180 cm (5 ft 11 in)

Volleyball information
- Position: Opposite
- Number: 5 (1981); 4 (1982)

National team
- Years: Team
- 1975–1982: China
Honours
Women's volleyball
Representing China
World Championship
Gold medal – first place	1982 Peru
FIVB World Cup
Gold medal – first place	1981 Japan
Asian Games
Gold medal – first place	1982 New Delhi	Team
Silver medal – second place	1978 Bangkok	Team

Yang Xi (Chinese: 杨希, born 1956, in Anxin County) is a Chinese former volleyball player. She was a member of the Chinese national team that won gold at both the 1981 FIVB Women's World Cup and the 1982 FIVB Women's World Championship. She also won a silver medal at the 1978 Asian Games and a gold medal at the 1982 Asian Games, after which she retired.

== Coaching ==
In 1989, Yang began coaching the Western Kentucky Lady Toppers.

== Personal life ==
Yang later became a businesswoman in the US. In 2012, she opened a school in Beijing which sought to incorporate western-style education with Chinese sports schools.
