= Zhang Jieyun =

Chinese volleyball player (born 1956)

Zhang Jiemin
Personal information
- Born: 1956 (age 69–70) Nantong, China
- Height: 173 cm (5 ft 8 in)

Volleyball information
- Position: Setter
- Number: 12

National team
- Years: Team
- 1977–1981: China
Honours
Women's volleyball
Representing China
FIVB World Cup
Gold medal – first place	1981 Japan
Asian Games
Silver medal – second place	1978 Bangkok	Team

Zhang Jiemin (Chinese: 张洁云; born 1956) is a Chinese former volleyball player who played the setter position. She was part of the Chinese team that won gold at the 1981 FIVB World Cup in Japan. She also won a silver medal at the 1978 Asian Games in Bangkok, Thailand.
