= Lang Ping =

Chinese volleyball player and coach

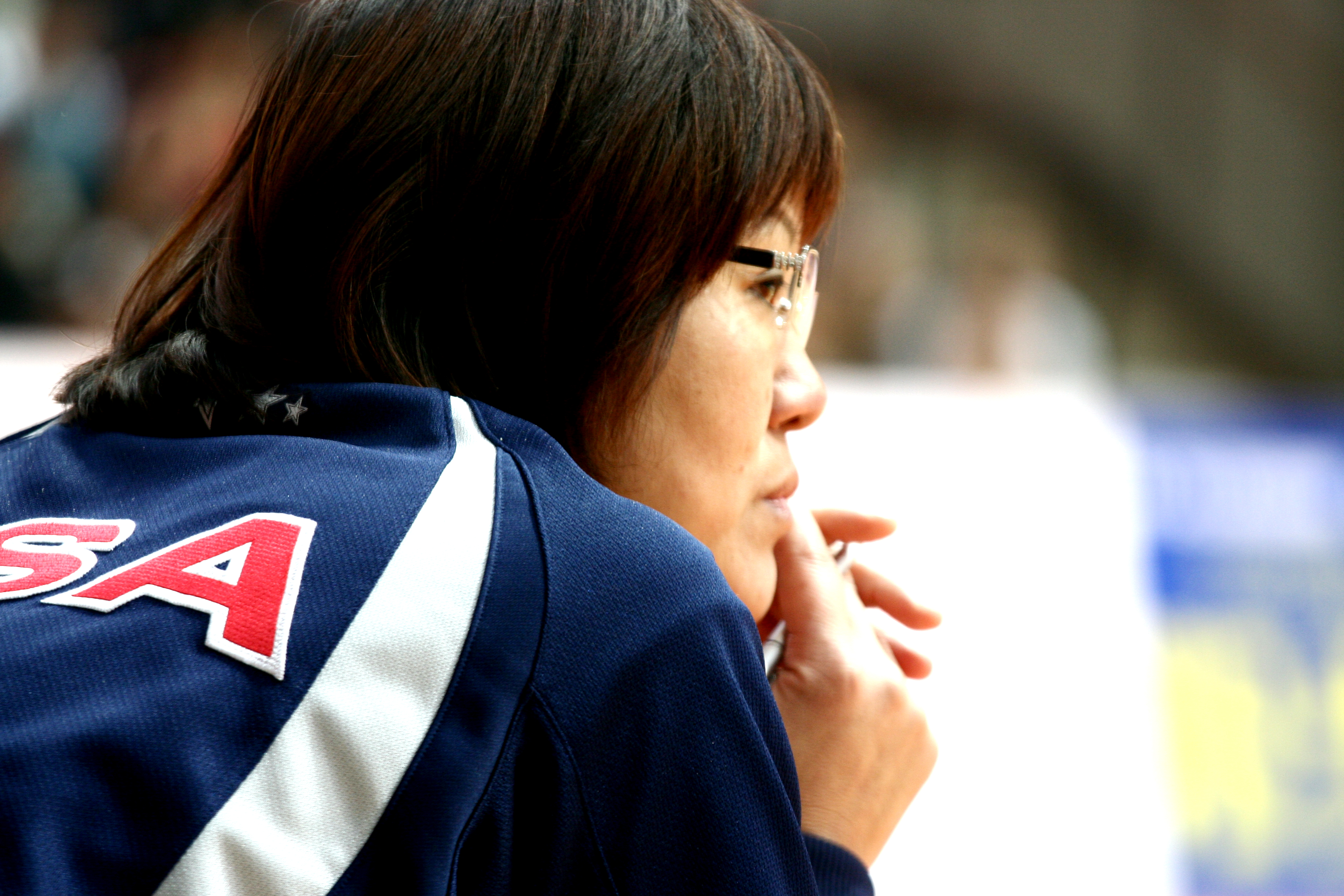
- Lang in 2008

Personal information
- Nickname: Iron Hammer (铁榔头/鐵榔頭)
- Born: 10 December 1960 (age 65); Tianjin, China
- Hometown: Tianjin, China
- Height: 1.84 m (6 ft 0 in)
- Weight: 71 kg (157 lb)
- Education: Beijing Normal University; University of New Mexico

Volleyball information
- Position: Outside hitter
- Number: 1

National team
| 1978–1985, 1990 | China |
Honours
Women's volleyball
Representing China
Olympic Games
| Gold medal – first place | 1984 Los Angeles | Team |
World Championship
| Gold medal – first place | 1982 Peru |
| Silver medal – second place | 1990 China | Team |
FIVB World Cup
| Gold medal – first place | 1981 Japan |
| Gold medal – first place | 1985 Japan |
Goodwill Games
| Silver medal – second place | 1990 Seattle |
Summer Universiade
| Gold medal – first place | 1981 Bucharest |
Asian Games
| Gold medal – first place | 1982 New Delhi | Team |
| Silver medal – second place | 1978 Bangkok | Team |

"Jenny" Lang Ping (Chinese: 郎平; pinyin: Láng Píng; born 10 December 1960) is a Chinese former volleyball player and coach. She is the former head coach of the Chinese women's national volleyball team and U.S. women's national volleyball team. As a player, Lang won the most valuable player award in women's volleyball at the 1984 Olympics.

In 2002, Lang became an inductee of the International Volleyball Hall of Fame in Holyoke, Massachusetts. She coached the U.S. women's national team to a silver medal at the 2008 Beijing Olympics in her home country. Lang later coached the gold medal-winning Chinese women's national team at the 2016 Rio Olympics, becoming the first person in volleyball history, male or female, to have won Olympic gold both as a player and as a coach.

Lang is the main character in the 2020 biographical film Leap, in which she is played by actress Gong Li.

== Personal life ==
Lang Ping was born in Tianjin. She was married to Chinese former handball player "Frank" Bai Fan from 1987 to 1995. In 1992, they had a daughter named Lydia Lang Bai, who played volleyball for Stanford University and played the young version of Lang Ping in the film Leap. Lang is currently married to Wang Yucheng, a professor at the China Academy of Social Science.

In 1987, Lang moved to Los Angeles with Bai to study and serve as an assistant volleyball coach at the University of New Mexico. When asked about the reasons for her move, she said she wanted "to taste a normal life." She maintains Chinese citizenship despite having lived in the U.S. for more than 15 years.

== Career ==
Nicknamed the "Iron Hammer", Lang was a member of the Chinese national team that won the gold medal over the United States at the 1984 Summer Olympics in Los Angeles. She was also a member of the team that won the World Championship crown in 1982 in Peru and won World Cup titles in 1981 and 1985 in Japan. She captained the 1985 World Cup team and was named the most valuable player of the tournament. The Chinese women's volleyball team won multiple World Championships during Lang's career. Lang was the star outside hitter on the team. She was named one of China's Top Ten Athletes of the year from 1981 to 1986.

=== Legacy in China ===
Owing to her central role in the success of the Chinese women's volleyball team in the 1980s, Lang was seen as a cultural icon and is one of the most respected people in modern Chinese sports history. Lang is remembered as one of the first world champions for China.

=== Coaching ===
Lang was an assistant coach at the University of New Mexico from 1987 to 1989 and 1992–93.

In 1995, Lang became the head coach of the Chinese national team and eventually guided the squad to the silver medal at the 1996 Summer Olympics in Atlanta and second place at the 1998 World Championships in Japan. Lang Ping resigned from the Chinese national team in 1998 for health reasons. In the following year, she took a head coaching position in the Italian professional volleyball league and enjoyed great success there, winning various honours and the coach of the year award multiple times. She was selected 1996 FIVB Coach of the Year.

She became the coach of the US National Team in 2005. Lang guided the team to the 2008 Olympics, where the US team faced off with China in her home country. The US team defeated China 3–2. Then Chinese and US presidents, Hu Jintao and George W. Bush, attended the match. The match drew 250 million television viewers in China alone. The team went on to win the silver medal, losing to Brazil in the finals 3–1. Lang allowed her contract to run out later that year, citing that she wanted to coach a club so as to spend more time with her family. She became the head coach of the China women's national volleyball team for the second time in 2013 and won the World Cup in Japan in 2015. In 2014, she was the only female head coach among the 24 teams in the FIVB World Championship.

On 21 August 2016, Lang Ping guided the Chinese national team to the gold medal at 2016 Rio Olympics. With this victory, Lang Ping became the first person in volleyball history, male or female, to win a gold medal at the Olympic Games as a player with the Chinese national team in Los Angeles 1984 and as the Chinese national team head coach in Rio 2016. On 29 September 2019, after China swept all eleven matches to defend the World Cup title, Lang Ping also became the first person to win the back-to-back World Cup champions both as a player (1981, 1985) and as a coach (2015, 2019).

==== Coaching career ====
| Club/Team | Country | year |
|---|---|---|
| Chinese NT | China | 1995 - 1998 |
| Volley Modena | Italy | 1999 - 2002 |
| Asystel Novara | Italy | 2002 - 2004 |
| Pieralisi Jesi | Italy | 2005 |
| USA NT | United States | 2005 - 2008 |
| Telecom Ankara | Turkey | 2008 - 2009 |
| Guangdong Evergrande | China | 2009 - 2014 |
| Chinese NT | China | 2013–2021 |

== Awards ==
=== Individuals ===
As a player

- 1982 FIVB World Championship "Most valuable player"
- 1984 Olympic Games "Most valuable player"
- 1985 FIVB World Cup "Most valuable player"

As a coach

- 1996 FIVB Coach of the Year

=== National team ===
As a player

- 1981 World Cup - (gold) Gold Medal
- 1982 World Championship - (gold) Gold Medal
- 1984 Olympic Games Los Angeles - (gold) Gold Medal
- 1985 World Cup - (gold) Gold Medal
- 1990 World Championship - (silver) Silver Medal

As a coach

- 1995 World Cup - (bronze) Bronze Medal
- 1996 Olympic Games Atlanta - (silver) Silver Medal
- 1998 World Championship - (silver) Silver Medal
- 2007 World Cup - (bronze) Bronze Medal
- 2008 Olympic Games Beijing - (silver) Silver Medal
- 2014 World Championship - (silver) Silver Medal
- 2015 World Cup - (gold) Gold Medal
- 2016 Olympic Games Rio - (gold) Gold Medal
- 2018 World Championship - (bronze) Bronze Medal
- 2019 World Cup - (gold) Gold Medal

| Preceded by (Japan) Toshi Yoshida | United States women's national volleyball team coach 2004-2008 | Succeeded by (New Zealand) Hugh McCutcheon |
