= Zhou Lumin =

Chinese volleyball player (born 1956)

Personal information
- Born: 1956 (age 69–70) Haining, Zhejiang, China
- Height: 178 cm (5 ft 10 in)

Volleyball information
- Position: Setter
- Number: 8

National team
- Years: Team
- 1979–1981: China
Honours
Women's volleyball
Representing China
FIVB World Cup
Gold medal – first place	1981 Japan

Zhou Lumin (Chinese: 周鹿敏, born 1956 in Haining) is a Chinese former volleyball player who played the setter position. She was part of the Chinese team that won gold at the 1981 FIVB World Cup.

== Coaching ==
After retirement, Zhou coached the Shanghai Women's Volleyball Team until 1998, for a total of twelve years.
