= United Arab Emirates men's national volleyball team =

National sports team

United Arab Emirates
- Association: United Arab Emirates Volleyball Association (UAEVA)
- Confederation: AVC
- Head coach: Khalid Aljasmi
- FIVB ranking: 78 ▲9 (1 October 2026)

Uniforms
| Home | Away |

Asian Championship
- Appearances: 8 (First in 1987)
- Best result: 10th (2001)

The United Arab Emirates men's national volleyball team represents United Arab Emirates in international volleyball competitions and friendly matches. The team was ranked 65 in the world in 2016.

== Competition record ==
=== Asian Championship ===
Asian Championship record
| Year | Position | Pld | W | L |
|---|---|---|---|---|
| (Australia) 1975 | Did not participate | | | |
| (Bahrain) 1979 | Did not participate | | | |
| (Japan) 1983 | Did not participate | | | |
| (Kuwait) 1987 | 15th place | 8 | 2 | 6 |
| (South Korea) 1989 | 11th place | 8 | 5 | 3 |
| (Australia) 1991 | 14th place | 5 | 1 | 4 |
| (Thailand) 1993 | Did not qualify | | | |
| (South Korea) 1995 | Did not qualify | | | |
| (Qatar) 1997 | 17th place | 3 | 0 | 3 |
| (Iran) 1999 | Did not qualify | | | |
| (South Korea) 2001 | 10th place | 3 | 1 | 2 |
| (China) 2003 | 15th place | 7 | 0 | 7 |
| (Thailand) 2005 | 17th place | 4 | 1 | 3 |
| (Indonesia) 2007 | Did not qualify | | | |
| (Philippines) 2009 | Did not qualify | | | |
| (Iran) 2011 | Did not qualify | | | |
| (United Arab Emirates) 2013 | 14th place | 7 | 3 | 4 |
| (Iran) 2015 | Did not qualify | | | |
| (Indonesia) 2017 | Did not qualify | | | |
| (Iran) 2019 | Did not qualify | | | |
| (Japan) 2021 | Did not qualify | | | |
| (Iran) 2023 | Did not qualify | | | |
| (Japan) 2026 | Did not qualify | | | |
| Total | 8/23 | 45 | 13 | 32 |

=== Asian Games ===
| Year | Result | Pld | W | L | SW | SL | PW | PL |
|---|---|---|---|---|---|---|---|---|
| (Japan) 1958 | Did not participate | | | | | | | |
| (Indonesia) 1962 | Did not participate | | | | | | | |
| (Thailand) 1966 | Did not participate | | | | | | | |
| (Thailand) 1970 | Did not participate | | | | | | | |
| (Iran) 1974 | Did not participate | | | | | | | |
| (Thailand) 1978 | 12th place | 0 | 0 | 0 | 0 | 0 | 0 | 0 |
| (India) 1982 | th place | 0 | 0 | 0 | 0 | 0 | 0 | 0 |
| (South Korea) 1986 | th place | 0 | 0 | 0 | 0 | 0 | 0 | 0 |
| (China) 1990 | th place | 0 | 0 | 0 | 0 | 0 | 0 | 0 |
| (Japan) 1994 | th place | 0 | 0 | 0 | 0 | 0 | 0 | 0 |
| (Thailand) 1998 | th place | 0 | 0 | 0 | 0 | 0 | 0 | 0 |
| (South Korea) 2002 | th place | 0 | 0 | 0 | 0 | 0 | 0 | 0 |
| (Qatar) 2006 | 15th place | 0 | 0 | 0 | 0 | 0 | 0 | 0 |
| (China) 2010 | th place | 0 | 0 | 0 | 0 | 0 | 0 | 0 |
| (South Korea) 2014 | th place | 0 | 0 | 0 | 0 | 0 | 0 | 0 |
| (Indonesia) 2018 | th place | 0 | 0 | 0 | 0 | 0 | 0 | 0 |
| (China) 2022 | th place | 0 | 0 | 0 | 0 | 0 | 0 | 0 |
| (Japan) 2026 | th place | 0 | 0 | 0 | 0 | 0 | 0 | 0 |
| Total | 0/16 | 0 | 0 | 0 | 0 | 0 | 0 | 0 |

=== West Asian Championship ===
West Asian Championship record
| Year | Round | Position | GP | MW | ML | SW | SL | Squad |
|---|---|---|---|---|---|---|---|---|
| (Bahrain) 2025 | 5th–8th places | 6th place | 6 | 3 | 3 | 9 | 12 | Squad |
| Total | 0 Titles | 1/1 | 6 | 3 | 3 | 9 | 12 | — |
