= Yuan Weimin =

Chinese volleyball player and coach

Personal information
- Born: 8 July 1939 (age 87); Suzhou, Jiangsu, China
- Hometown: Suzhou, Jiangsu, China
Honours
Head coach for the China women's volleyball
Olympic Games
Gold medal – first place	1984 Los Angeles	Indoor
Women's World Championship
Gold medal – first place	1982 Peru	Indoor
FIVB World Cup
Gold medal – first place	1981 Japan	Indoor

Yuan Weimin (simplified Chinese: 袁伟民; traditional Chinese: 袁偉民; pinyin: Yuán Wěimín; born 8 July 1939, in Suzhou, Jiangsu) is a Chinese sports administrator and civil servant. He was the Executive President of the Beijing Organizing Committee for the 2008 Summer Olympics.

== Playing career ==
Yuan was selected to represent Jiangsu province in the volleyball competition of the first National Games in 1958 while studying at Nanjing Sport Institute. In 1962, he joined the national volleyball team.

Cultural Revolution hit when he was at his peak. While he was not persecuted because of his peasant background which was considered politically reliable at the time, his team members were sent home. Yuan spent much of his time studying volleyball coaching, without a team to coach. Yuan retired as a player in 1974 from the position of national team captain.

== Managerial career ==
In 1976, Yuan was appointed head coach of the women's national volleyball team. His task was to restore the team to pre-Cultural Revolution-level. He did more than that, transforming a team from a 16th place finish in the 1974 FIVB Volleyball Women's World Championship to a super power, winning the 1981 World Cup, the 1982 world championship and the 1984 Olympic gold medal.

Yuan was inducted into the International Volleyball Hall of Fame in 2007.

== Political career ==
Yuan became a national hero after winning gold medal in the Olympics. His book My Way of Teaching was a sellout. Volleyball terms were quoted in household conversation. Yuan was promoted to vice-minister of the Sports Commission at age 36, and was elected as a candidate member of the Central Committee of the Chinese Communist Party in 1985. In 2000, Yuan was promoted to director general of the Chinese General Administration of Sports and chairman of the Chinese Olympic Committee.

Yuan was appointed to lead the Chinese Football Association after the disastrous 1986 FIFA World Cup qualification finish. He resigned in 1989 after the national Olympic team went goalless in the 1988 Olympics, but was brought back after his replacement Nian Weisi resigned following another failure in the 1990 FIFA World Cup qualification AFC Final Round. Yuan chaired the association until 2004.

Government offices
Preceded by Wu Shaozu	Director General of the Chinese General Administration of Sports; 2000 – 2004	Succeeded by Liu Peng
Preceded by Wu Shaozu	Chairperson of the Chinese Olympic Committee; 2000 – 2005	Succeeded by Liu Peng
Preceded by Li Fenglou	Chairperson of the Chinese Football Association; 1985 – 1989	Succeeded by Nian Weisi
Preceded by Nian Weisi	Chairperson of the Chinese Football Association; 1992 – 2005	Succeeded by Liu Peng
Preceded by Yasutaka Matsudaira	President of the Asian Volleyball Confederation; 1997 – 2001	Succeeded by Wei Jizhong
Preceded by Xu Cai	President of the Wushu Federation of Asia; 1994 – 2000	Succeeded by Li Zhijian
