= Volleyball at the 1978 Asian Games =

1978 volleyball events

- Dates: 10–19 December 1978
- Nations: 16

Volleyball events were contested at the 1978 Asian Games in Bangkok, Thailand.

== Medalists ==
Event	Gold	Silver	Bronze
Men	South Korea; Cha Joo-hyun; Chang Yoon-chang; Chung Kang-sup; Kang Doo-tae; Kang Man-soo; Kim Ho-chul; Kim Kab-je; Lee Hee-wan; Lee In; Moon Yong-kwan; Park Ki-won; Yoo Joong-tak	Japan; Haruhiko Hanawa; Shohei Iwatsuki; Yoshio Kobayashi; Takashi Maruyama; Katsutoshi Nekoda; Tetsuo Nishimoto; Katsumi Oda; Kenji Shimaoka; Mikiyasu Tanaka; Yoshinori Tanaka; Shinichiro Tsujiai	China; Chen Fulin; Chen Gang; Hou Jie; Hu Jin; Li Jianxin; Wang Jiawei; Wang Qingheng; Xu Zhen; Zheng Zongyuan; Zhou Zhongyu
Women	Japan; Yumi Egami; Yoshie Ishikawa; Yoko Kawamata; Kazuko Ogawa; Keiko Okushima; Kayoko Sudo; Juri Yokoyama; Terie Yuki	China; Chen Zhaodi; Han Xiaohua; Lang Ping; Li Wenxiu; Qi Lixia; Sun Jinfang; Yang Xi; Zhang Jieyun; Zhang Rongfang; Zhou Xiaolan	South Korea; Baik Myung-sun; Byon Kyung-ja; Kim Ae-hee; Kim Hwa-bok; Kwak Sun-ok; Kweon In-sook; Lim Hae-sook; Shim Soon-ok; Shin Sang-sun; Yang Soon-duk; Yoon Young-nae; Yu Kyung-hwa

== Medal table ==
Rank	Nation	Gold	Silver	Bronze	Total
1	Japan (JPN)	1	1	0	2
2	South Korea (KOR)	1	0	1	2
3	China (CHN)	0	1	1	2
Totals (3 entries)		2	2	2	6

== Results ==
=== Men ===
==== Preliminary round ====
===== Pool A =====
Pos	Team	Pld	W	L	Pts	SW	SL	SR	Qualification
1	Burma	4	4	0	8	12	0	MAX	Final round
2	Iraq	4	3	1	7	9	3	3.000	Final round
3	Thailand	4	2	2	6	6	9	0.667	Classification 7th–12th
4	Pakistan	4	1	3	5	5	11	0.455	Classification 7th–12th
5	Hong Kong	4	0	4	4	3	12	0.250	

Source: Results

Date		Score		Set 1	Set 2	Set 3	Set 4	Set 5	Total
10 Dec	Thailand	3–1	Hong Kong						
10 Dec	Iraq	3–0	Pakistan						
11 Dec	Thailand	0–3	Iraq	12-15	10-15	9-15			31-45
11 Dec	Hong Kong	0–3	Burma						
12 Dec	Iraq	0–3	Burma						
12 Dec	Thailand	3–2	Pakistan						
13 Dec	Burma	3–0	Pakistan						
13 Dec	Iraq	3–0	Hong Kong						
14 Dec	Pakistan	3–2	Hong Kong						
14 Dec	Thailand	0–3	Burma						

===== Pool B =====
Pos	Team	Pld	W	L	Pts	SW	SL	SR	Qualification
1	Japan	4	4	0	8	12	0	MAX	Final round
2	Kuwait	4	3	1	7	9	3	3.000	Final round
3	Bangladesh	4	2	2	6	6	7	0.857	Classification 7th–12th
4	United Arab Emirates	4	1	3	5	—	—	—	Classification 7th–12th
5	Nepal	4	0	4	4	—	—	—	

Source: Results

Date		Score		Set 1	Set 2	Set 3	Set 4	Set 5	Total
10 Dec	Nepal	0–3	Kuwait						
10 Dec	Japan	3–0	Bangladesh						
11 Dec	Japan	3–0	Nepal	15-3	15-1	15-0			45-4
11 Dec	Bangladesh	3–1	United Arab Emirates	15-12	15-10	12-15	15-5		57-42
12 Dec	Japan	3–0	Kuwait						
12 Dec	United Arab Emirates	–	Nepal						
13 Dec	Kuwait	3–0	United Arab Emirates						
13 Dec	Bangladesh	3–0	Nepal						
14 Dec	Kuwait	3–0	Bangladesh	15-1	15-5	15-8			45-14
14 Dec	Japan	3–0	United Arab Emirates						

===== Pool C =====
Date		Score		Set 1	Set 2	Set 3	Set 4	Set 5	Total
10 Dec	South Korea	3–0	India						
10 Dec	China	3–0	Saudi Arabia						
11 Dec	India	3–0	Bahrain	15-6	15-5	15-4			45-15
11 Dec	South Korea	1–3	China	12–15	9–15	15–4	8–15		44–49
12 Dec	South Korea	3–0	Saudi Arabia	15-2	15-2	15-2			45-6
12 Dec	China	3–0	Bahrain						
13 Dec	China	3–0	India						
13 Dec	Saudi Arabia	3–0	Bahrain						
14 Dec	South Korea	3–0	Bahrain						
14 Dec	Saudi Arabia	–	India						

==== Classification 7th–12th ====
Date		Score		Set 1	Set 2	Set 3	Set 4	Set 5	Total
15 Dec	United Arab Emirates	0–3	Saudi Arabia						
16 Dec	Pakistan	3–0	Thailand	15-11	15-1	15-10			45-22
16 Dec	India	3–0	United Arab Emirates	15-0	15-3	15-4			45-7
17 Dec	Bangladesh	3–0	United Arab Emirates						
18 Dec	Pakistan	2–3	United Arab Emirates						
19 Dec	Pakistan	3–0	Thailand						
19 Dec	India	3–0	Saudi Arabia						

==== Final round ====
Date		Score		Set 1	Set 2	Set 3	Set 4	Set 5	Total
15 Dec	China	0–3	South Korea	14–16	8–15	7–15			29–46
15 Dec	Burma	3–1	Iraq						
15 Dec	Japan	3–0	Kuwait	15-0	15-3	15-4			45-7
16 Dec	China	3–0	Kuwait	15-2	15-4	15-1			45-7
16 Dec	Japan	3–0	Iraq	15-7	15-4	15-3			45-14
16 Dec	Burma	0–3	South Korea						
17 Dec	Burma	0–3	Japan						
17 Dec	China	3–1	Iraq	14-16	15-3	15-3	15-7		59-29
17 Dec	Kuwait	0–3	South Korea	0-15	6-15	7-15			13-45
18 Dec	Iraq	0–3	Kuwait						
18 Dec	Burma	0–3	China						
18 Dec	Japan	3–1	South Korea						
19 Dec	Iraq	0–3	South Korea	3-15	7-15	10-15			20-45
19 Dec	Burma	3–0	Kuwait						
19 Dec	Japan	1–3	China	9-15	7-15	15-11	12-15		43-56

=== Women ===
Pos	Team	Pld	W	L	Pts	SW	SL	SR
1	Japan	5	5	0	10	15	1	15.000
2	China	5	4	1	9	12	4	3.000
3	South Korea	5	3	2	8	10	6	1.667
4	North Korea	5	2	3	7	7	9	0.778
5	Thailand	5	1	4	6	3	13	0.231
6	Hong Kong	5	0	5	5	1	15	0.067

Source: Results

Date		Score		Set 1	Set 2	Set 3	Set 4	Set 5	Total
10 Dec	China	3–0	North Korea	15-11	16-14	15-8			46-33
10 Dec	Thailand	0–3	Japan	1-15	1-15	1-15			3-45
10 Dec	South Korea	3–0	Hong Kong	15-1	15-4	15-13			45-18
12 Dec	China	3–0	Hong Kong	15-0	15-1	15-1			45-2
12 Dec	Thailand	0–3	North Korea	3-15	5-15	0-15			8-45
12 Dec	Japan	3–1	South Korea	15-11	7-15	15-11	15-13		52-50
14 Dec	Japan	3–0	China	15-9	15-9	15-10			45-28
14 Dec	North Korea	3–0	Hong Kong	15-2	15-0	15-2			45-4
14 Dec	Thailand	0–3	South Korea	0-15	1-15	1-15			2-45
16 Dec	Thailand	0–3	China	3-15	0-15	1-15			4-45
16 Dec	Japan	3–0	Hong Kong						
16 Dec	South Korea	3–0	North Korea	15–6	15–10	15–4			45–20
18 Dec	Thailand	3–1	Hong Kong						
18 Dec	Japan	3–0	North Korea						
18 Dec	China	3–0	South Korea	15–4	15–9	15–6			45–19
