= Leslie Woodard =

American volleyball player (born 1964)

Personal information
- Full name: Leslie Ann Woodard
- Born: March 2, 1964 (age 62); Encino, California, United States
- Height: 6 ft 2 in (1.88 m)

Volleyball information
- Position: Middle Hitter/Blocker

Leslie Ann Woodard (born March 2, 1964) is a former professional women's volleyball player. She played college volleyball from 1982 to 1986, and played on the Major League Volleyball team the Chicago Breeze from 1987 to 1989. She also provided color commentary for ESPN during 1989.

== Background ==
Leslie was born in Encino, California, on March 2, 1964, to Clifford Richard Devereaux and Nancy Lee May. She had four siblings, brothers Paul, Frank, and Mike, and sister Danielle. She attended El Toro High School from 1978 to 1982, where she played volleyball, softball, and basketball. Outside of school, she played on travel volleyball team ANVA. During her junior year in High School, Leslie was asked by Ari Selinger, coach of the USA Women's National Volleyball Team, to join the team as a junior player. She practiced with the team for a year, and travelled to Mexico for an international tournament. Instead of continuing with the Olympic team, she decided to attend college.

== College ==
Leslie received a full athletic scholarship to the University of Southern California to play women's volleyball. She played her entire college career, from 1982-1986. She was Captain of the USC team from 84-86, a two-time All-American, and made it to the NCAA Final Four in her freshman and senior year. In her senior year, she finished the season with the best hitting percentage of any player: 0.467. She was also a member of the Business Fraternity at USC. She graduated with a degree in Business Marketing.

== Professional career ==
Upon graduation, she was drafted to play for the first professional women's indoor volleyball league, Major League Volleyball. This league consisted of 6 teams: the New York Liberties, the Chicago Breeze, the Minnesota Monarchs, the San Jose Golddiggers, the Los Angeles Starlites, and the Dallas Belles. Leslie played for the Chicago Breeze from 1987 until the league's disbandment in 1989. In her second season, Leslie injured her knee, and required Anterior cruciate ligament reconstruction surgery. As the surgery made her temporarily unable to play volleyball, she took a brief job at ESPN, providing color commentary for the remaining Major League Volleyball games. In March 1989, one month into the third season of Major League Volleyball, the six owners announced that they were to suspend operation of the League due to lack of funding.

== Personal life ==
Leslie currently lives in San Diego, California, where she resides with her husband and her two children.

== See also ==
Major League Volleyball
