= Ruth Lawanson =

Nigerian volleyball player

Personal information
- Full name: Ruth Modupe Lawanson
- Nationality: American
- Born: September 27, 1963 (age 63); Ibadan, Oyo, Nigeria
- Height: 5 ft 8 in (1.73 m)
- Education: California State University, Fresno

Volleyball information
- Position: Outside hitter
- Number: 15

National team
1989–1992	United States
Medal record
Women's volleyball
Representing the United States
Olympic Games
Bronze medal – third place	1992 Barcelona	Team
World Championship
Bronze medal – third place	1990 China	Team

Ruth Modupe Lawanson (born September 27, 1963) is a former volleyball player and college volleyball coach. Born in Nigeria, she played volleyball for Fresno State and the United States national team, winning a bronze medal at the 1992 Summer Olympics.

== Playing career ==
=== College ===
Lawanson played for the Fresno State volleyball team and was named MVP of the team in 1982, 1983, and 1984. In 1984, her senior season, she led the Bulldogs to a fifth-place finish at the NCAA tournament, was named NorPac co-Player of the Year, and was an All-American. She was also named the 1984-85 Fresno State Female Athlete of the Year. Lawanson was the first female athlete in school history to have her jersey number retired, and she is a member of the Fresno State Athletic Hall of Fame.

=== International ===
Lawanson played on the U.S. national team for four years. She won bronze medals with the team at the 1990 FIVB World Championship in China, 1991 FIVB World Cup in Japan, and 1992 Summer Olympics in Barcelona.

=== Professional ===
Lawanson played for the Dallas Belles and Minnesota Monarchs of Major League Volleyball from 1987 to 1989. She was named the league MVP in 1988. She later played in Italy and France from 1992 to 1995.

== Coaching career ==
Lawanson was an assistant coach at Purdue University for four years, at Fresno State for six years, at the United States Air Force Academy for two years, and at the University of Nevada for one year. She was the head coach at Angelo State for three seasons in which she led the team to a 19-65 record. She was named the head coach of Nevada's team in 2011. On November 26, 2014, she was relieved of her coaching duties at Nevada.

== Personal ==
Lawanson was born on September 27, 1963, in Ibadan, Oyo, Nigeria, the daughter of Samuel and Caroline Lawanson. Her father was a well-known athlete in Nigeria. She immigrated to the United States with her family when she was two years old. Lawanson attended Clovis West High School, where she was a standout athlete who competed in volleyball, basketball, and track. She graduated from Fresno State with a degree in business administration in 1987. She has served as a member of the board of directors of the American Volleyball Coaches Association.

Lawanson married Shawn Kenan in 2002. Her cousin, Foluke Akinradewo, also played for the U.S. national volleyball team.
