= Zartman (surname) =

Zartman is a surname. Notable people with the surname include:

- I. William Zartman (1932–2025), American negotiation scholar and academic
- Pat Zartman, American volleyball coach

== See also ==
- Evon Zartman Vogt (1918–2004), American anthropologist
