= Major League Volleyball =

Major League Volleyball may refer to:

- Major League Volleyball (1987), a defunct league that played in 1987–1989
- Major League Volleyball (2026), a current league
