= Encino-Tarzana Regional Medical Center =

Coordinates: 34.170348°N 118.531929°W

Geography
- Location: San Fernando Valley, California, United States

Organization
- Type: Community
- Network: Tenet Healthcare

Services
- Beds: 400

History
- Closed: 2008

Links
- Lists: Hospitals in California

The Encino-Tarzana Regional Medical Center consisted of two hospitals, one in Tarzana and the other in Encino, California. Together, the two hospitals had approximately 400 beds. The hospitals were owned by Tenet Healthcare until 2008. Previously, Encino-Tarzana Regional Medical Center was operated as a joint venture between Tenet and HCA, but Tenet bought out its partner's share in 2006 in preparation for divesting it. Encino-Tarzana Regional Medical Center specializes in cardiac services, diabetes care, geriatrics, orthopedics, women's health & maternity care, oncology, rehabilitation medicine, pediatrics and has one of the largest neonatal intensive care units in the Valley.

In June 2008, the Encino Regional Medical Center was bought by Prime Healthcare. In July 2008, the Tarzana Regional Medical Center was bought by Providence Health & Services.
