= Lindy Vivas =

American volleyball coach

Linda J. Vivas is an American former college volleyball coach and professional volleyball player. In 1988–89, she was the executive director of Major League Volleyball. After losing her job as head coach of women's volleyball at Fresno State University, she won a $5.85 million settlement in 2007.

== Early life and education ==
Vivas graduated in 1975 from Punahou School in Honolulu, where she played basketball and softball in addition to volleyball; she was inducted into the school's hall of fame in 2013. In 1980 she earned a degree in kinesiology from the University of California, Los Angeles (UCLA). She played volleyball for the Bruins in her senior year. Before transferring to UCLA, she attended the University of Southern California, where she was on the 1976 national championship Trojans volleyball team, won an AIAW All-Region award that year, and also played basketball.

== Career ==
In 1979, Vivas was an assistant coach for the UCLA Bruins. From 1979 to 1980, she played for the San Jose Diablos in the International Volleyball Association. She was then an associate coach for the Texas A&M Aggies women's volleyball team from 1980 to 1983. In 1983 she played pro volleyball for the Texas Magic and was a USVBA All-American. From 1984 to 1987, she was head coach of the Washington Huskies women's volleyball team, amassing a 72–60 record. In 1987 she played in Major League Volleyball for the New York Liberties.

From 1988 to its disbanding in March 1989, she was Executive Director/Commissioner of Major League Volleyball.

Vivas then became a real estate agent in the San Francisco Bay Area before resuming her volleyball coaching career as an assistant coach at San Jose State University in 1990.

From 1991 to 2004 she was head coach of the Fresno State Bulldogs women's volleyball team. During that time, she was an assistant coach for the USA national B team in 1992. At Fresno State, Vivas became the winningest coach in the program's history, with a 263–167 overall record and a .612 overall winning percentage. Her teams finished in the top three of the Western Athletic Conference standings six times, and she was named WAC Coach of the Year three times (1992, 1997, 2002). In the 2002 season, the Bulldogs finished 23–7 overall for their best single-season winning percentage, 767. During her tenure the team reached the NCAA Tournament three times (1991, 1998, 2002), went to the National Invitational Volleyball Championship three times (1992, 1994, 1995), and reached the American Volleyball Coaches Association Top 25 national poll three times. The home match against the University of Hawaiʻi on November 9, 2003, attracted a school record crowd of 4,708.

== Firing and lawsuit ==
On December 6, 2004, Vivas was let go from the Fresno State head coaching position. The university gave as its reason that she had not done enough to improve the volleyball program; Vivas said she was fired for advocating for gender equity in accordance with Title IX, and also that she had been discriminated against on grounds of her presumed sexual orientation. She sued the university in Fresno County Superior Court. On July 9, 2007, a jury decided that the university had discriminated against Vivas, and awarded her $5.85 million in damages, at the time a record-setting amount in a sex discrimination case. In October, a judge lowered the amount to $4.5 million.
