= Encino, Los Angeles =

Encino
- Neighborhood of Los Angeles
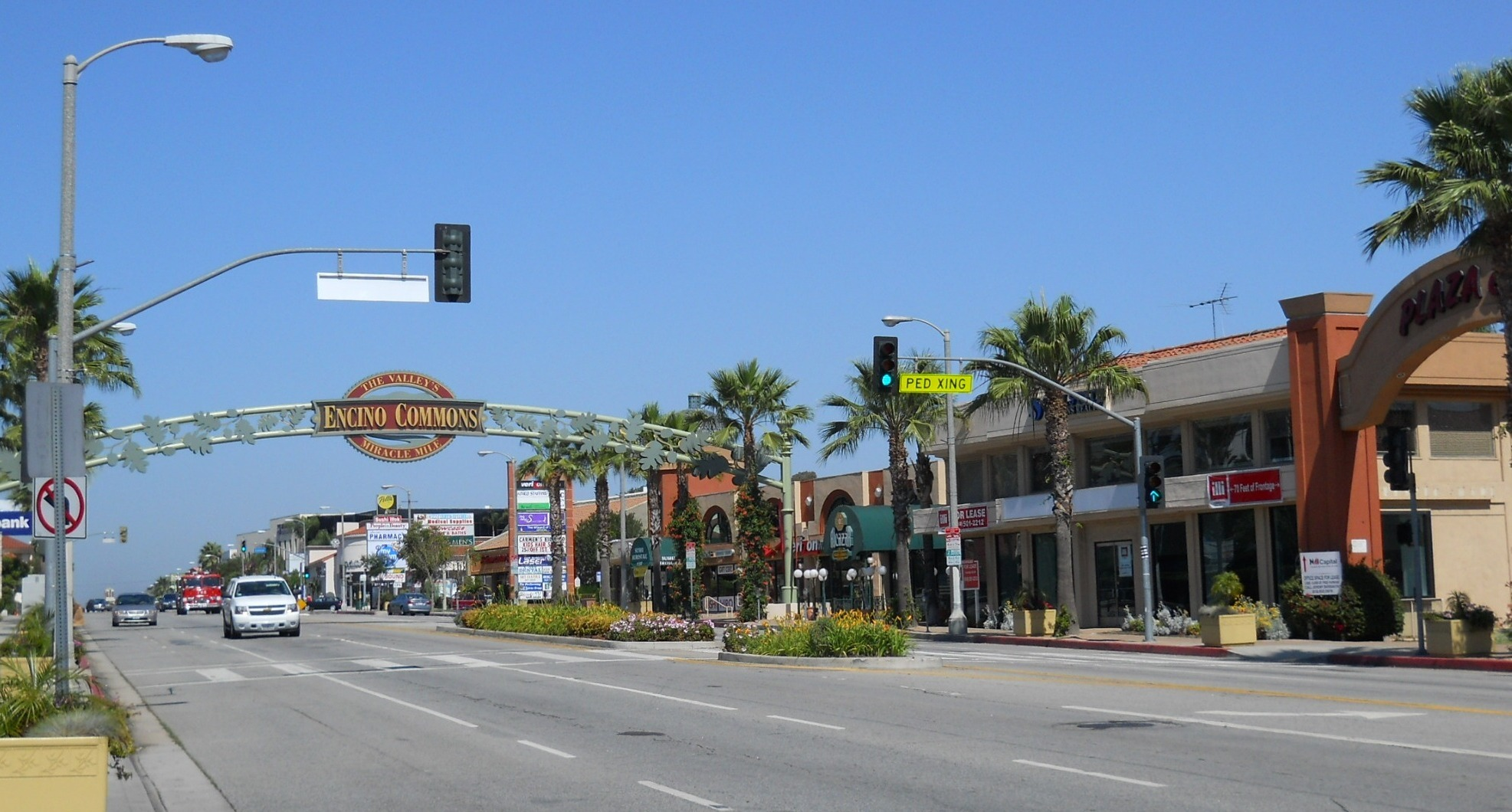
- Encino Commons in Encino, 2010

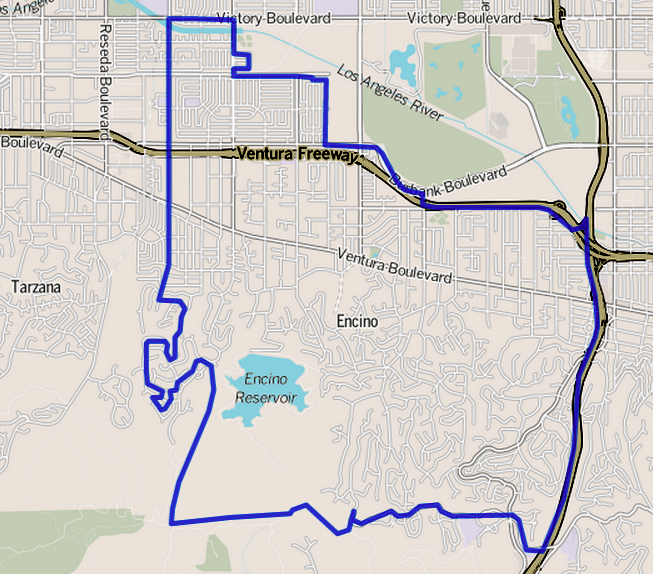
- Encino as mapped by the Los Angeles Times

- Location within Los Angeles/San Fernando Valley Encino (the Los Angeles metropolitan area)
- Coordinates: 34.15917°N 118.50028°W
- Country: United States
- State: California
- County: Los Angeles
- City: Los Angeles
- Named for: Rancho Los Encinos
- Elevation: 774 ft (235.9 m)

Population (2023)
  - Total: 53,085
- Time zone: UTC-8 (PST)
  - Summer (DST): UTC-7 (PDT)
- ZIP code: 91316, 91436

Encino is a neighborhood in the San Fernando Valley region of Los Angeles, California.

== History ==
=== Etymology ===
The name Encino is the misspelling in masculine of Encina, the Spanish word for "holm oak" (Quercus ilex). The Spanish name reflects the original Tongva-language name for the village of Siutcanga, which can be translated to "the place of the oaks."

=== Early history ===
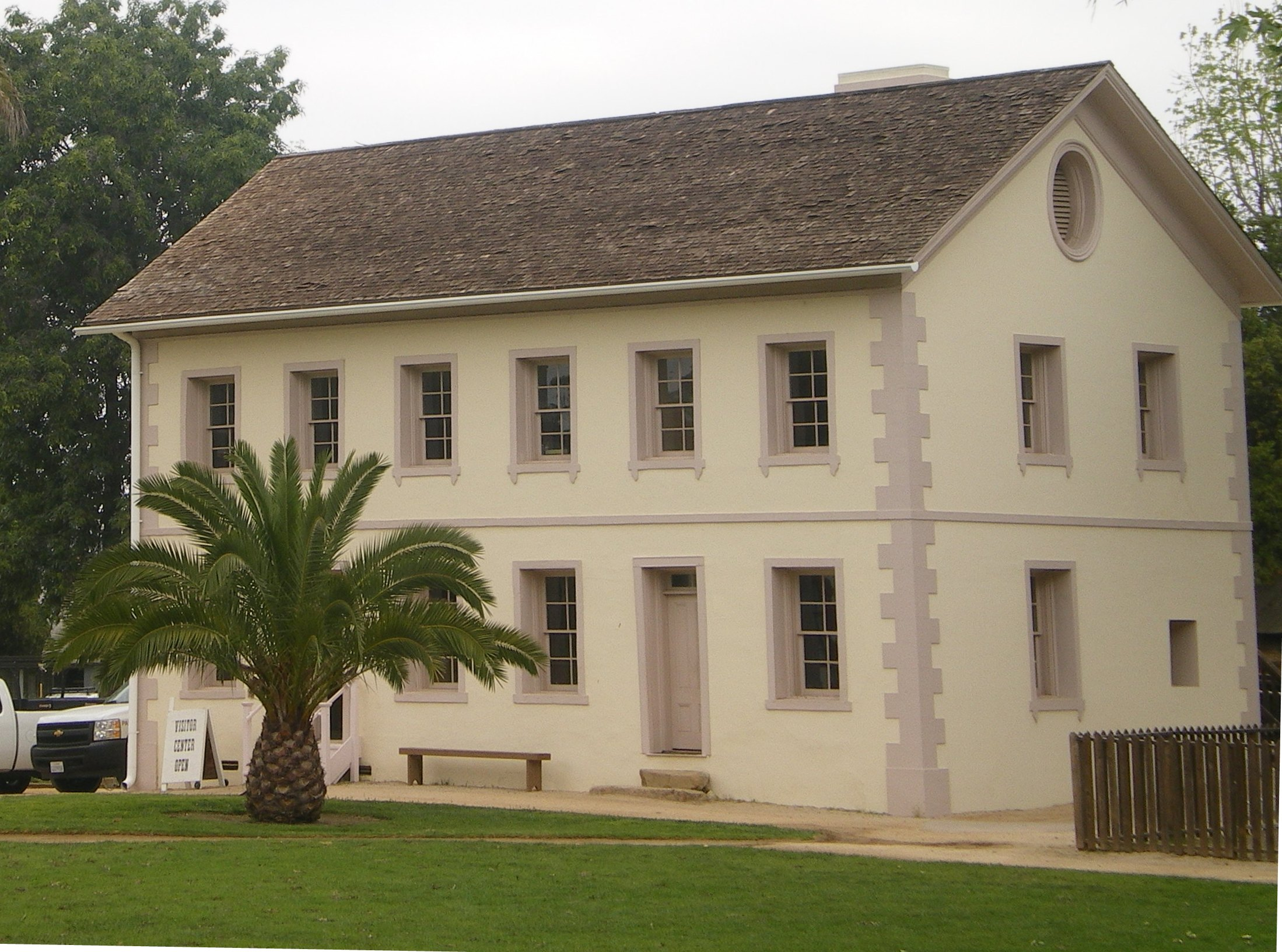
Rancho Los Encinos is today preserved and open to the public as Los Encinos State Historic Park.

In 1769, the Spanish Portolá expedition, first Europeans to see inland areas of California, traveled north through Sepulveda Pass into the San Fernando Valley on August 5 and stayed two nights at the Tongva village of Siutcanga ("the place of the oaks") near what is now Los Encinos State Historic Park. Fray Juan Crespi, a Franciscan missionary traveling with the expedition, named the valley "El Valle de Santa Catalina de Bolonia de Los Encinos" (The Valley of St. Catherine of Bologna of the Oaks). All of Crespi's name was later dropped except "Encino".

Rancho Los Encinos (Ranch of Holm Oaks) was established in 1845 when a large parcel of former Mission San Fernando land was granted to three Mission Indians by governor Pio Pico. Many ranchos were created after the secularization of the California missions, which began in 1834. Encino derives its name from the rancho.

== Geography ==
Encino is situated in the central portion of the southern San Fernando Valley and on the north slope of the Santa Monica Mountains. It is flanked on the north by Reseda, Lake Balboa, and the Sepulveda Basin, on the east by Sherman Oaks, on the south by Brentwood, and on the west by Tarzana.

=== Climate ===
Climate data for Encino, Los Angeles, California
Month	Jan	Feb	Mar	Apr	May	Jun	Jul	Aug	Sep	Oct	Nov	Dec	Year
Mean daily maximum °F (°C)	67 (19)	69 (21)	71 (22)	76 (24)	79 (26)	86 (30)	92 (33)	94 (34)	90 (32)	83 (28)	74 (23)	68 (20)	79 (26)
Mean daily minimum °F (°C)	43 (6)	44 (7)	45 (7)	47 (8)	51 (11)	55 (13)	58 (14)	59 (15)	57 (14)	52 (11)	45 (7)	42 (6)	50 (10)
Average precipitation inches (mm)	3.96 (101)	4.28 (109)	3.51 (89)	0.83 (21)	0.28 (7.1)	0.06 (1.5)	0.01 (0.25)	0.17 (4.3)	0.26 (6.6)	0.50 (13)	1.30 (33)	2.08 (53)	17.24 (438.75)

== Demographics ==
The 2000 U.S. census counted 41,905 residents in the 9.5-square-mile (25 km^{2}) Encino neighborhood — 4,411 inhabitants per square mile (1,703/km^{2}), among the lowest population densities for the city but average for the county. In 2008, the city estimated that the resident population had increased to 44,581.

In 2000, the median age for residents was 42, considered old for city and county neighborhoods; the percentages of residents aged 50 and older were among the county's highest.

The neighborhood demographic breakdown was Whites, 80.1%; Latinos, 8.5%; Asians, 4.9%; Blacks, 2.4%; and others, 4.1%.

Iran (30.1%) and Russia (6.4%) were the most common places of birth for the 32.8% of the residents who were born abroad—an average percentage for Los Angeles.

The median yearly household income in 2008 dollars was $78,529, considered high for the city. The percentage of households that earned $125,000 and up was high for Los Angeles County. The average household size of 2.3 people was low when compared to the rest of the city and the county. Renters occupied 38.4% of the housing stock and house- or apartment-owners held 61.6%.

The percentages of divorced residents and of widowed men and women were among the county's highest. In 2000 military veterans amounted to 10.6% of the population, a high rate for the county.

== Economy ==
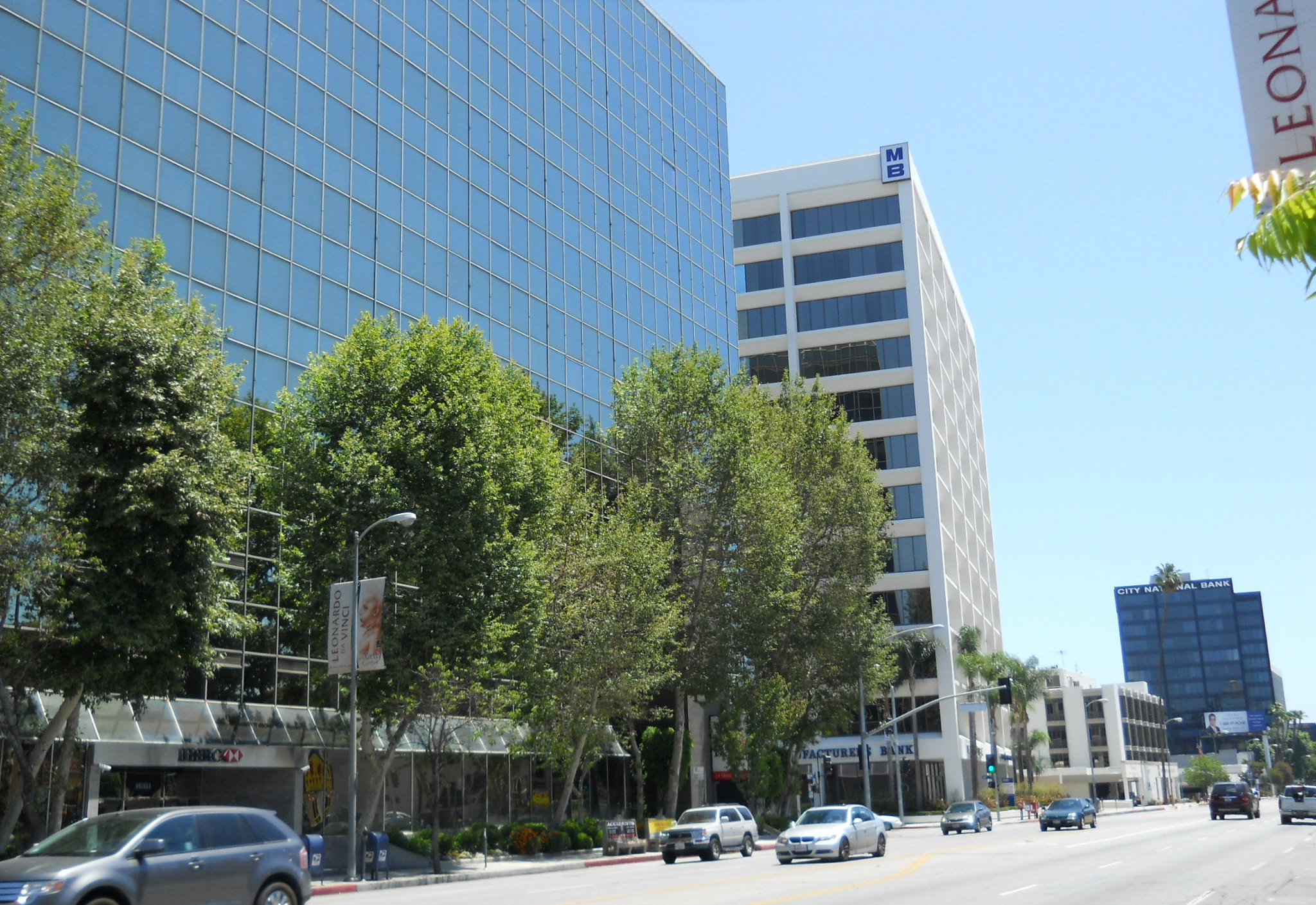
Financial institution on Ventura Boulevard

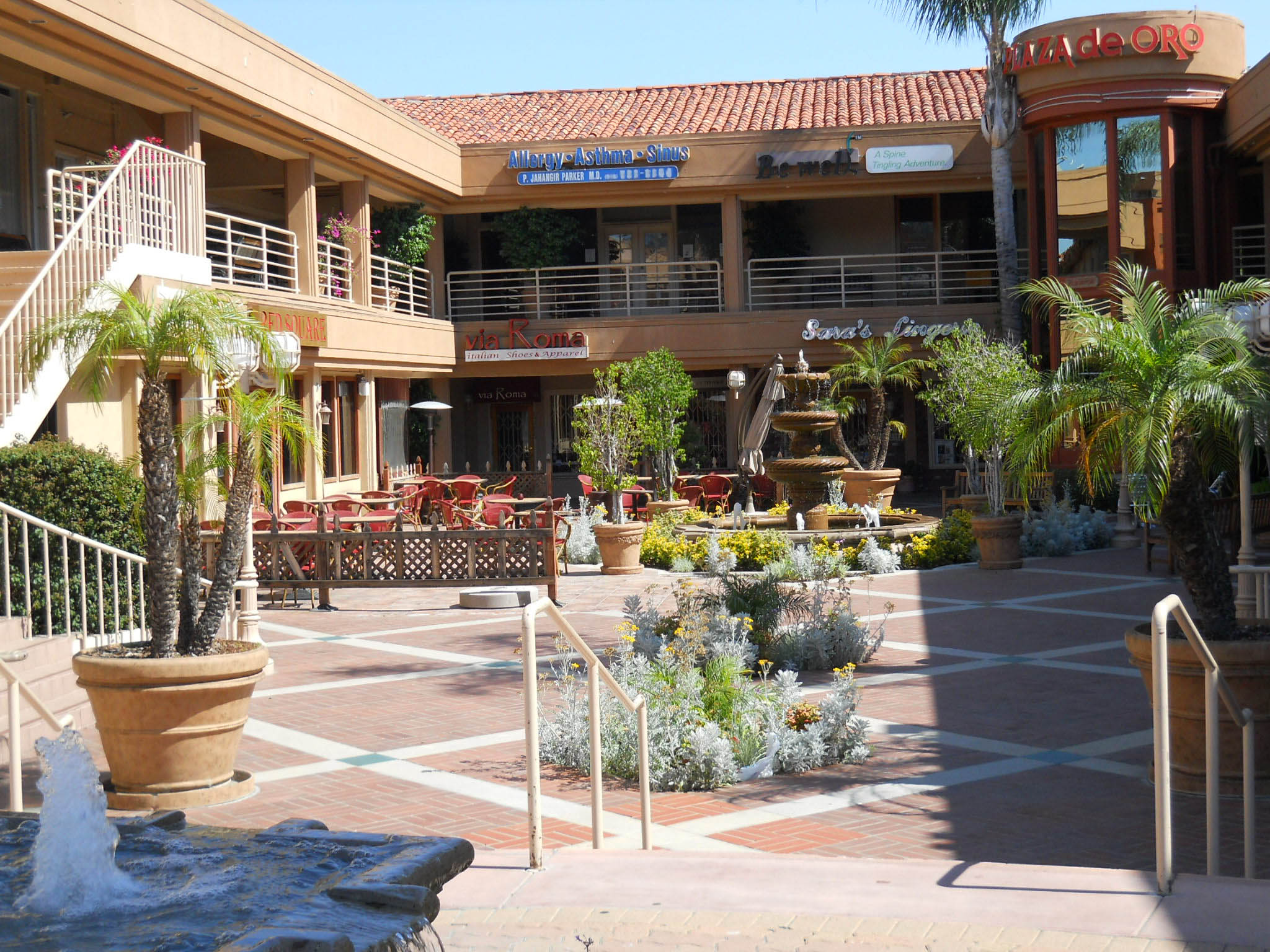
Plaza de Oro Shopping Center, Ventura Boulevard

The local economy provides jobs primarily in health care (including one of two Encino-Tarzana Regional Medical Center hospitals), social services, and professional services (accounting and financial services, real estate, and legal) sectors. There are approximately 3,800 businesses employing about 27,000 people at an annual payroll of $1.4 billion.

== Arts and culture ==
=== Attractions ===
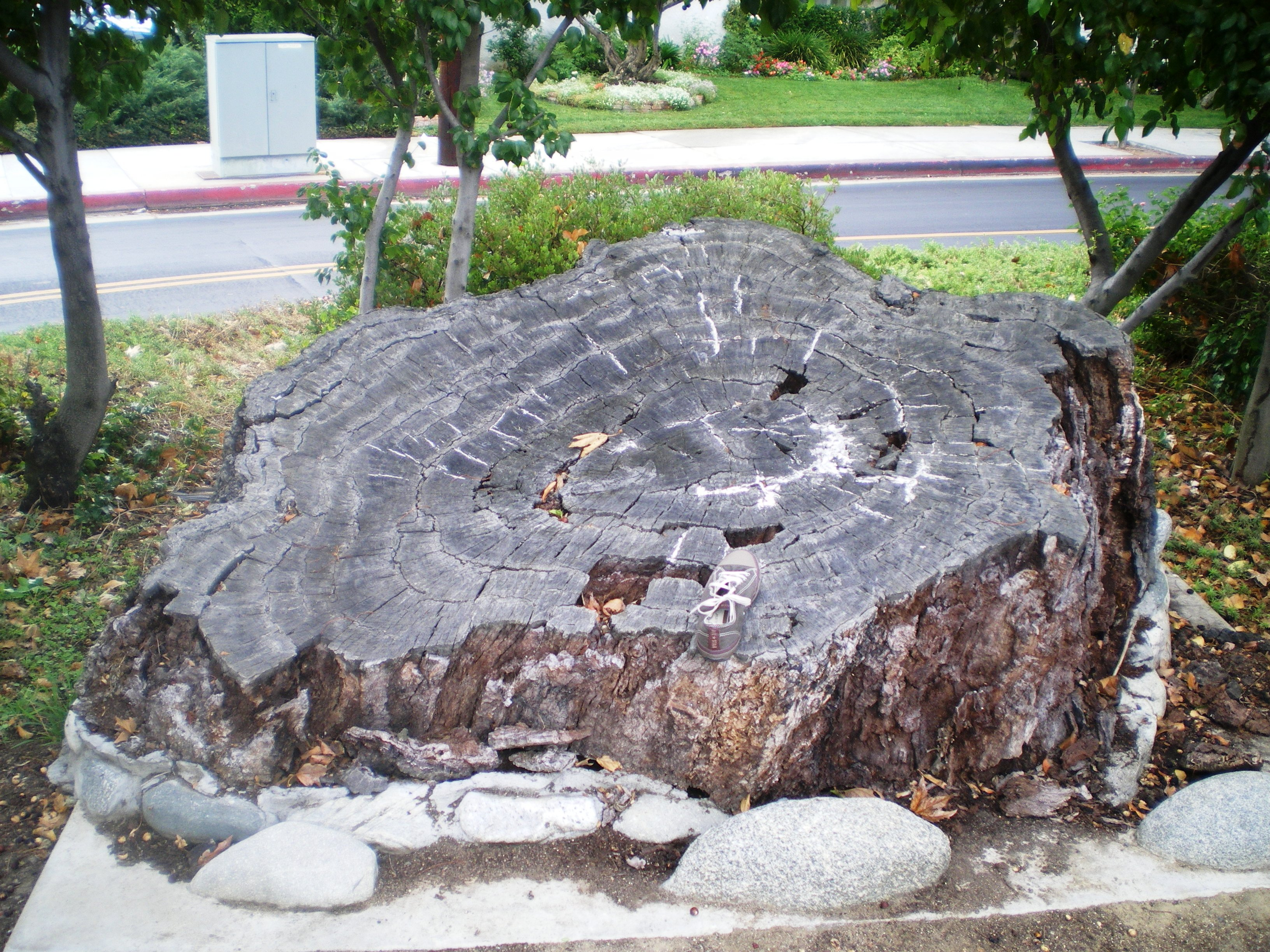
The stump pictured in 2008 is all that remains of the historic Encino Oak Tree.

The Encino Velodrome has provided an outdoor oval bicycle racing track since 1961.

Los Encinos State Historic Park features historic buildings, a small museum, and picnic grounds. In 2009 it faced closure due to California's budget crisis. The Park remains open today.

The Sepulveda Basin Recreation Area is a large area with multiple golf courses, tennis courts, soccer fields, baseball diamonds, bike paths, and a lake bordered by about 2,000 Pink Cloud cherry trees that blossom in the spring. Encino Park was founded around 1937 and has a playground, as well as basketball courts and two lighted tennis courts.

For over a millennium, the area known as Encino was the home of a massive California live oak known as the Encino Oak Tree. It is possible that Encino is named because of this particular tree. (Encino is the Spanish word for "evergreen" or "holm oak.") It was known for its size and longevity. The tree died on February 7, 1998, after an El Niño storm felled it. Today there is a monument to the tree at the corner of Ventura Boulevard and Louise Avenue where the Encino Oak once stood.

== Parks and recreation ==
California State Parks operates the 5-acre (2.0 ha) Los Encinos State Historic Park in Encino. The park includes the original nine-room de la Ossa Adobe, the Garnier Building, a blacksmith shop, a pond, and a natural spring.

The Sepulveda Dam Recreation Area, located in Encino, includes the Woodley Worel/Magnus Cricket Complex. Also included in the basin is the Encino Golf Course and the Balboa Golf Course.

The Balboa Sports Complex in Encino includes a lighted baseball diamond, lighted outdoor basketball courts, a children's play area, a community room, a lighted football field, a lighted handball court, an indoor gymnasium without weights and with a capacity for 400 people, an unlighted soccer field, lighted tennis courts which can be used as Pickleball courts, and lighted volleyball courts. The Sepulveda Basin Off-leash Dog Park is a dog park in Encino. The dog park has 6.5 acres (2.6 ha) of leash-free dog area, a 0.5-acre (0.20 ha) small dog area, an on-leash picnic area, 100 parking spots, and public telephones. The Sepulveda Garden Center, a community garden area in Encino, has about 16 acres (6.5 ha) of land and 420 garden plots.

== Government ==
Encino is in Los Angeles County Board of Supervisors district 3 and Los Angeles City Council District 4. It is also represented within the city of Los Angeles by the Encino Neighborhood Council, an advisory body.

== Education ==
Schools within the Encino boundaries are:

=== Public ===
Encino is served by the Los Angeles Unified School District (LAUSD).

- Hesby Oaks Leadership Charter School (K-8 school)
- Encino Charter Elementary School
- Emelita Street Elementary School
- Fred E. Lull Special Education Center
- Lanai Road Elementary School

As of 2009, there were no public high schools in Encino. Public high schools serving portions of Encino were Birmingham High School in Lake Balboa, and Reseda High School in Reseda.

In 1984 the LAUSD board of trustees voted to close the Rhoda Street School.

=== Private ===
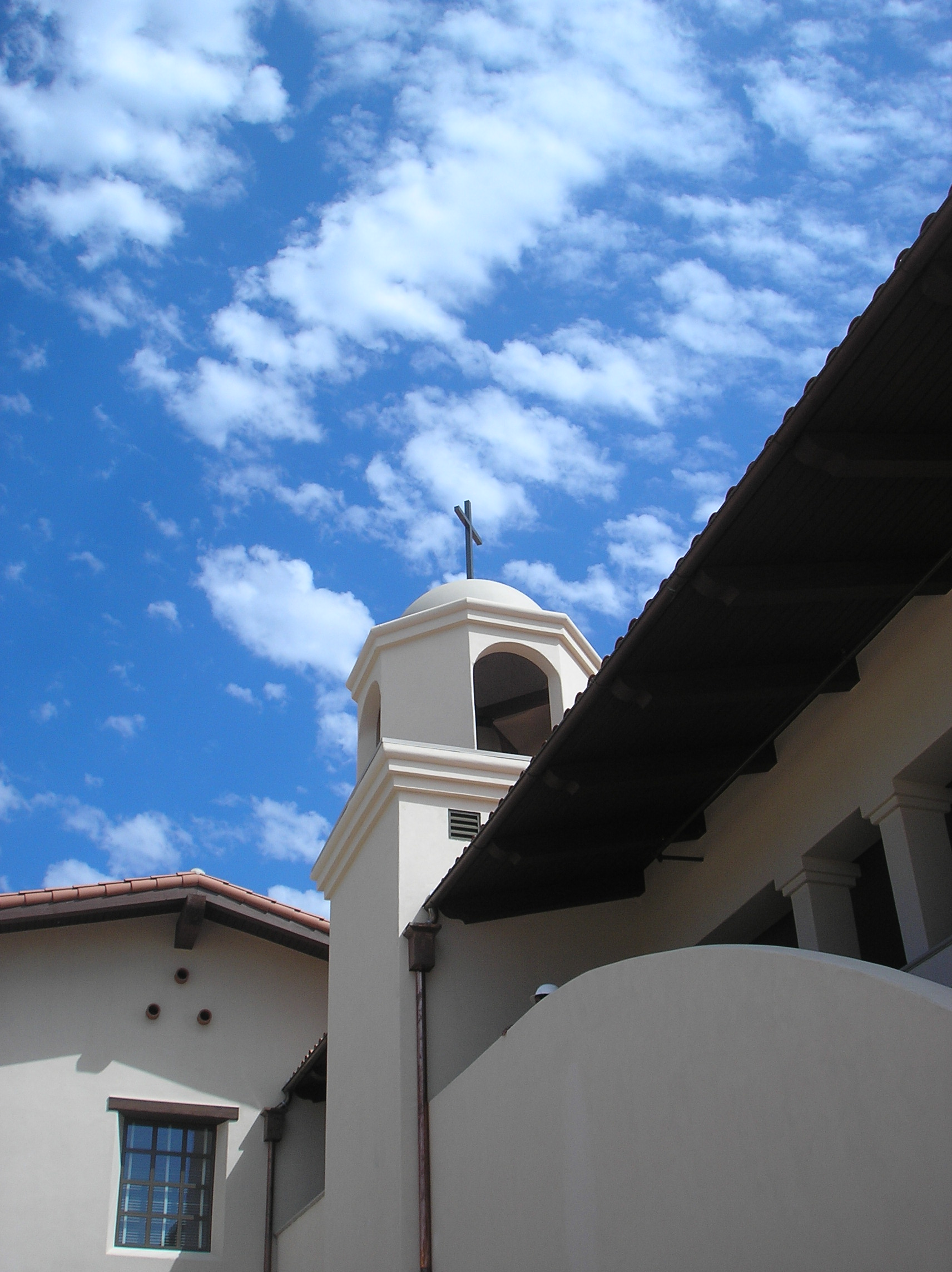
Crespi Carmelite High School

- Westmark School
- Holy Martyrs Armenian High School/Ferrahian
- Crespi Carmelite High School
- Valley Beth Shalom

== Media ==
The movie Fast Times At Ridgemont High filmed several scenes in Encino

The entire town scenery of Bedford Falls was built in 1946 on 4 acres in Encino, CA for the movie 'It's a Wonderful Life' starring Jimmy Stewart and Donna Reed. (see DVD special features for more specific details).

== Notable people ==
=== A–K ===
- Bud Abbott, comedian
- Leonidas Alaoglu, mathematician
- Steve Allen, actor, author
- Don Ameche, actor
- Daniel Amen, psychiatrist, born in Encino
- Marc Anthony, singer-songwriter
- Gilbert Arenas, former NBA player
- David Arquette, actor
- Catherine Bach, actress
- Scott Baio, actor
- Colleen Ballinger, actress, comedian, singer
- Foster Brooks, comedian
- Edgar Rice Burroughs, author
- Reggie Bush, former NFL player
- Richard Carlson, actor and film director
- Jack Carson, actor
- Dana Carvey, actor-comedian
- Richard Crenna, actor
- James Charles, makeup artist, influencer
- Kelly Clarkson, singer and talk-show host
- Marie Currie, singer and actress, born in Encino
- Sondra Currie, actress
- Olivia Culpo, model
- Alexis Denisof, actor
- Lenny Dykstra, professional athlete
- Percy Faith, bandleader, orchestrator, composer and conductor
- Alice Faye, actress
- David Forst, general manager of Oakland Athletics
- Annette Funicello, actress
- Clark Gable, actor
- David Gregory, television journalist
- Dave Grohl, musician
- Selena Gomez, singer and actor
- Alyson Hannigan, actress
- Phil Harris, musician
- Phil Hartman, actor
- George Harrison musician.
- David Hasselhoff, actor and singer
- Chick Hearn, sportscaster
- Edward Everett Horton, actor
- Ron Howard, actor, director and producer
- Ice Cube, rapper and actor
- Jackson family, musical group
- Izza, singer and rapper
- Samuel L. Jackson, actor and producer
- Kelly Johnson, engineer, Lockheed Aircraft executive
- Al Jolson, singer and actor
- Victoria Justice, actress and singer
- Daren Kagasoff, actor, born in Encino
- Wiz Khalifa, rapper
- Lisa Kudrow, actress
- Ted Greene, jazz guitarist, music educator

=== L–Z ===
- Nick Lachey, singer
- Tim Laker, professional baseball player
- Robin Lane, rock singer/songwriter
- Martin Lawrence, actor and comedian
- Carole Lombard, actress
- Julie London, actress
- Sean McVay, head coach of the Los Angeles Rams
- Jayne Meadows, actress, author
- Leighton Meester, actress and singer
- Idina Menzel, singer
- Michael Milken, financier; born in Encino
- Mahbod Moghadam, internet entrepreneur
- Graham Nash, singer
- Lori Nelson, actress
- Stephanie Niznik, actress
- Barney Oldfield, race car driver
- Kelly Paris, baseball player; born in Encino
- Candace Parker and Shelden Williams, basketball stars
- Chris Paul, NBA player
- Logan Paul, YouTuber, actor, and director
- Daniel Pearl, journalist
- Dan Peña, businessman and motivational speaker
- Tom Petty, singer-songwriter
- Richard Pryor, actor and comedian
- Jeff Rake, producer and screenwriter
- Billy Ray (born 1971), screenwriter and film director
- Sally Ride, physicist and astronaut; born in Encino
- Jenni Rivera, singer
- Mickey Rooney, actor
- Kyle Richards, actress
- Daniel Rotman, entrepreneur
- Ann Sheridan, actress
- Ashlee Simpson, singer and actress
- Slash, musician
- Kenny Smith, NBA player and TNT host
- Cassius Stanley, NBA player; raised in Encino.
- Kader Sylla, professional skateboarder
- Joy Taylor, media personality and television host for Fox Sports 1
- Bob Thomas, Hollywood reporter and author
- John Travolta, actor
- Arthur Treacher, actor
- Steve Vai, guitarist
- Frankie Valli, singer
- Earl Watson, former NBA player and coach
- John Wayne, actor and director
- Deryck Whibley, Sum 41 member
- Jack Webb, actor and director
- Roger Williams, pianist
- Pete Wentz, member of Fall Out Boy
- Leslie Woodard, volleyball player
- John Wooden, basketball coach

== In popular culture ==
- Patchy the Pirate, the live-action host of special episodes of the animated children's television series SpongeBob SquarePants, played by Tom Kenny, lives in Encino.
- The 1992 movie Encino Man revolves around two geeky teenagers from Encino who discover a caveman in their backyard, frozen in a block of ice where he has to learn to live in the 20th century while teaching the teenagers about life
- Paul Thomas Anderson's 2021 movie Licorice Pizza is largely set in 1970s Encino

== Gallery ==
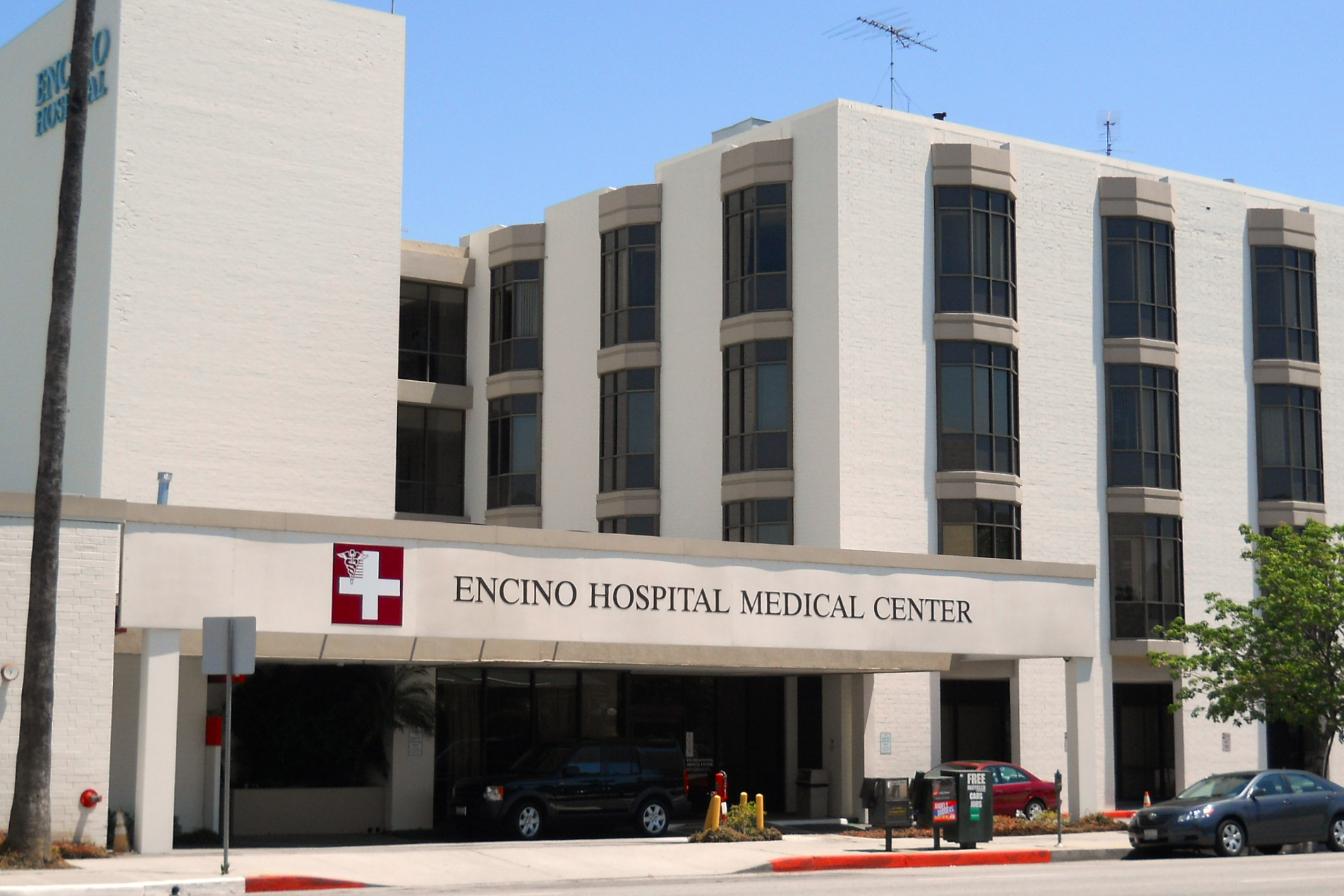
Encino Hospital Medical Center, Ventura Boulevard

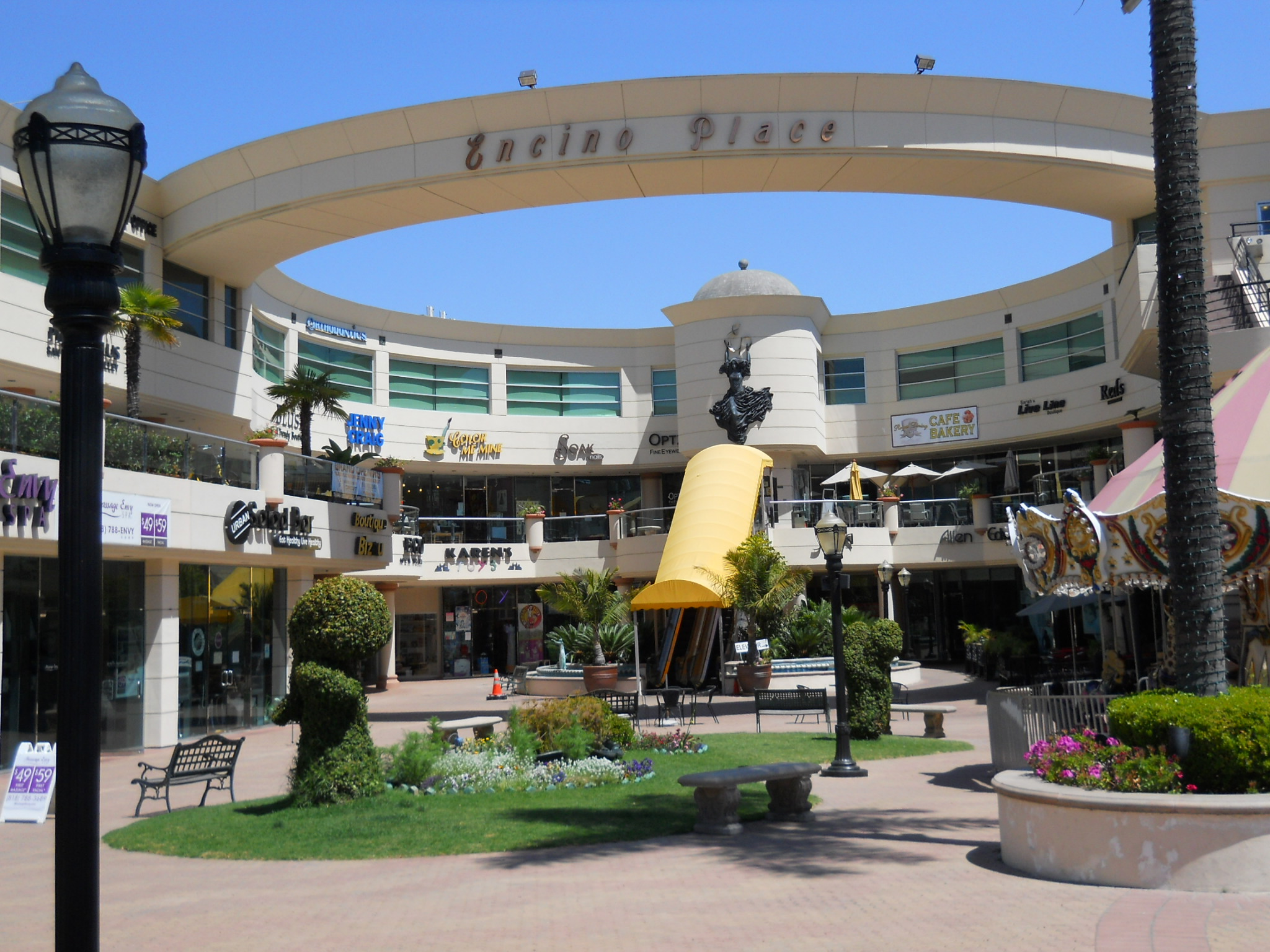
Encino Place, Ventura Boulevard

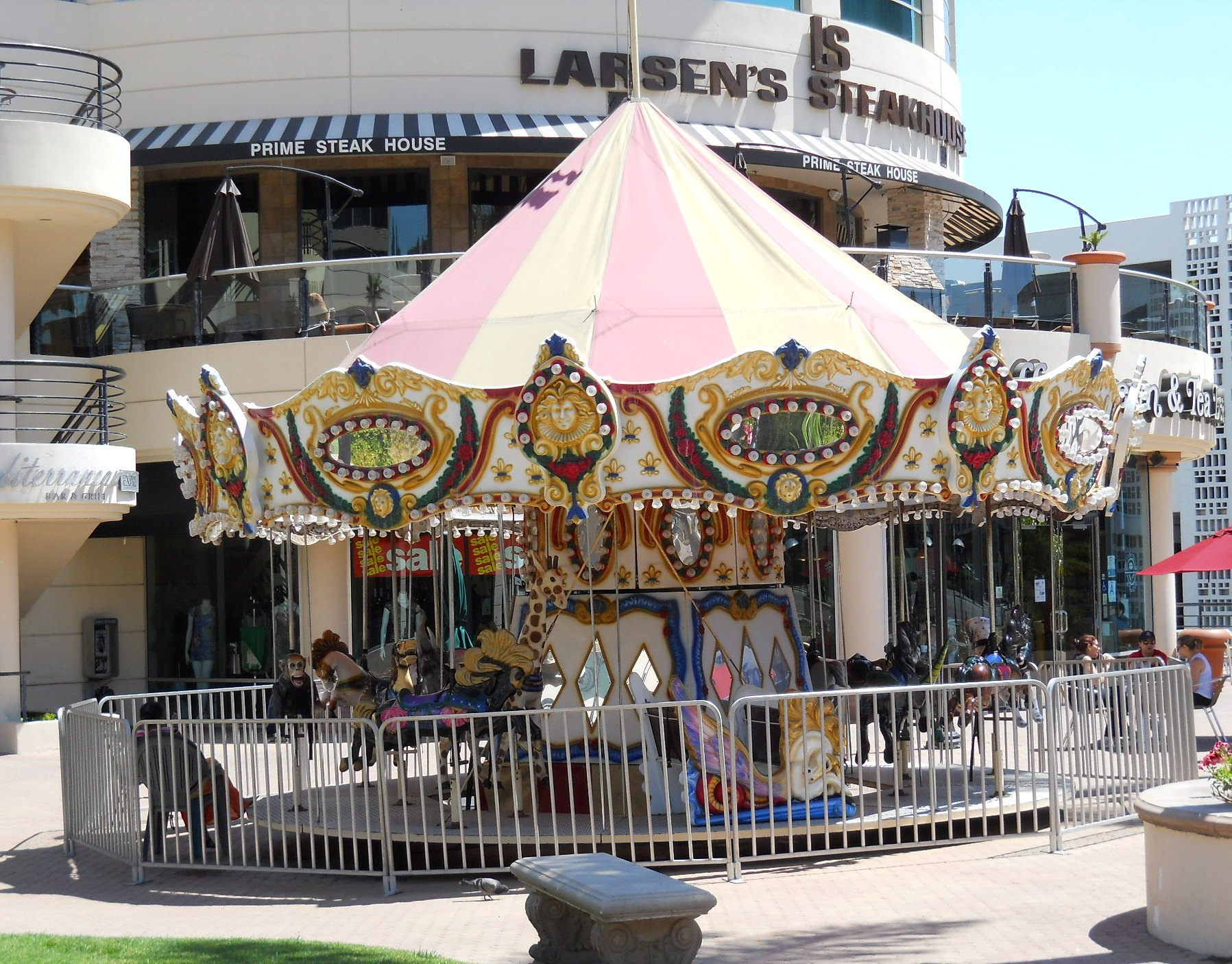
Children's carousel at Encino Place

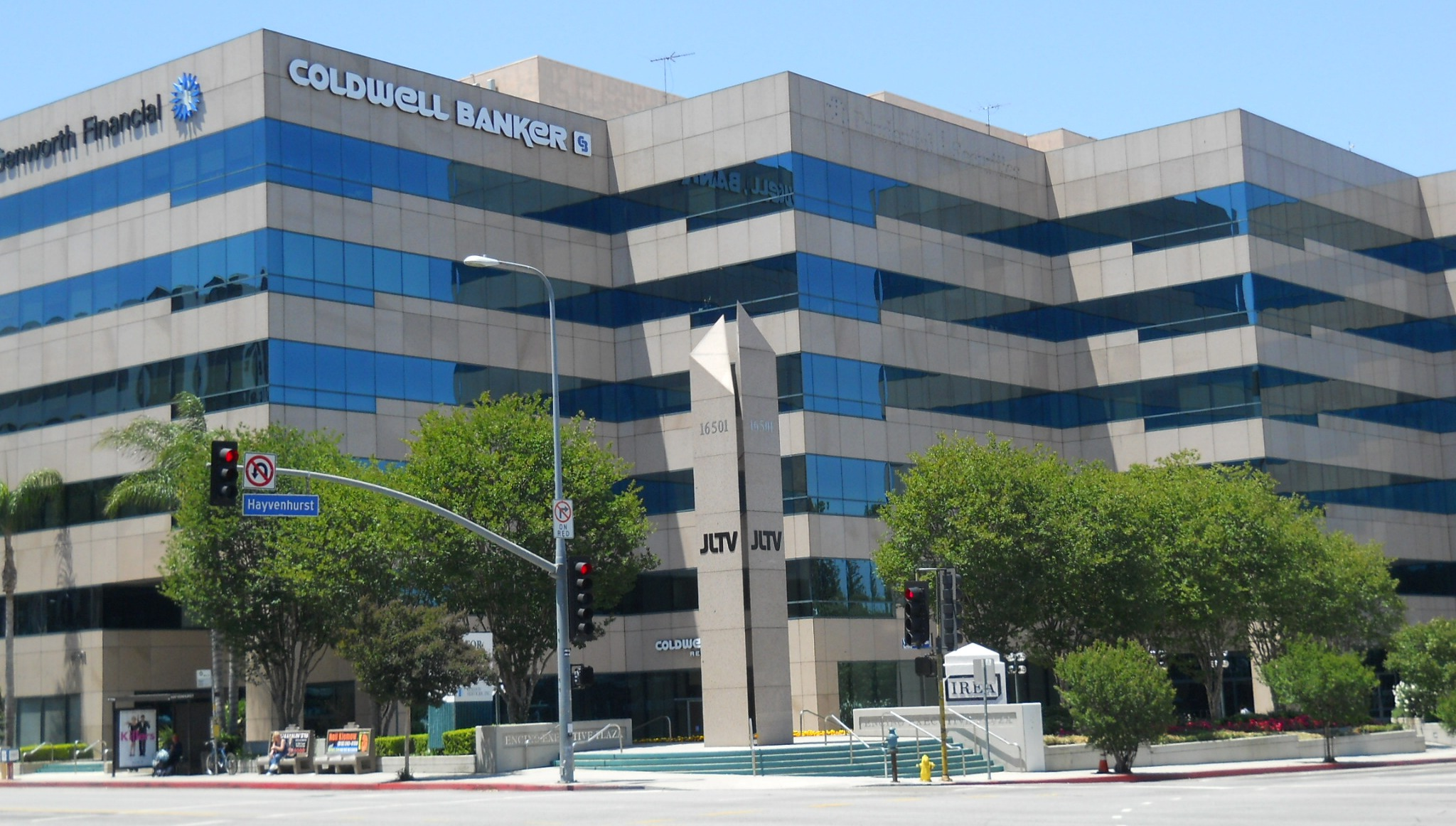
Coldwell Banker, Encino Executive Plaza, Ventura Blvd. and Hayvenhurst

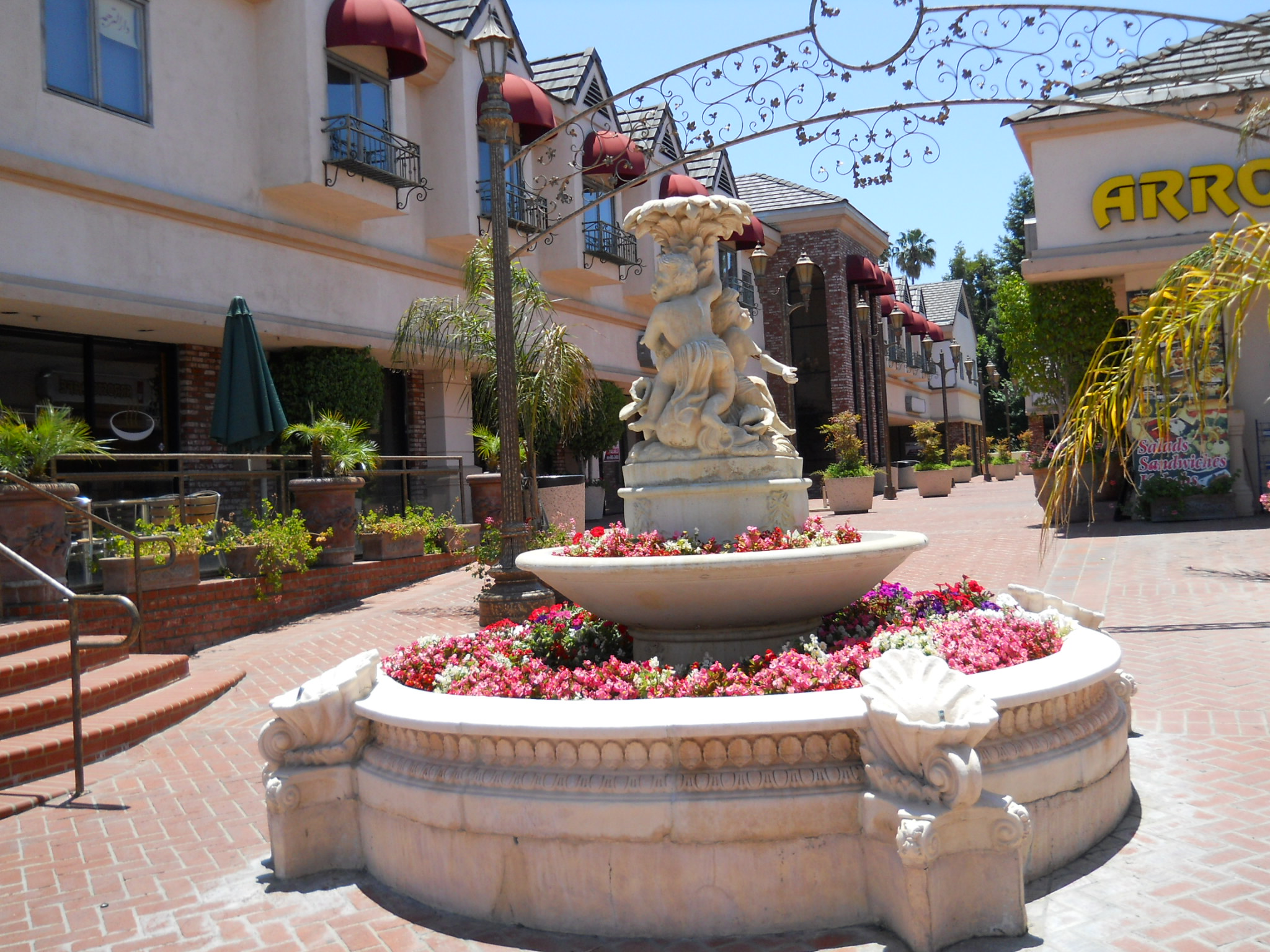
Statuary on Ventura Boulevard

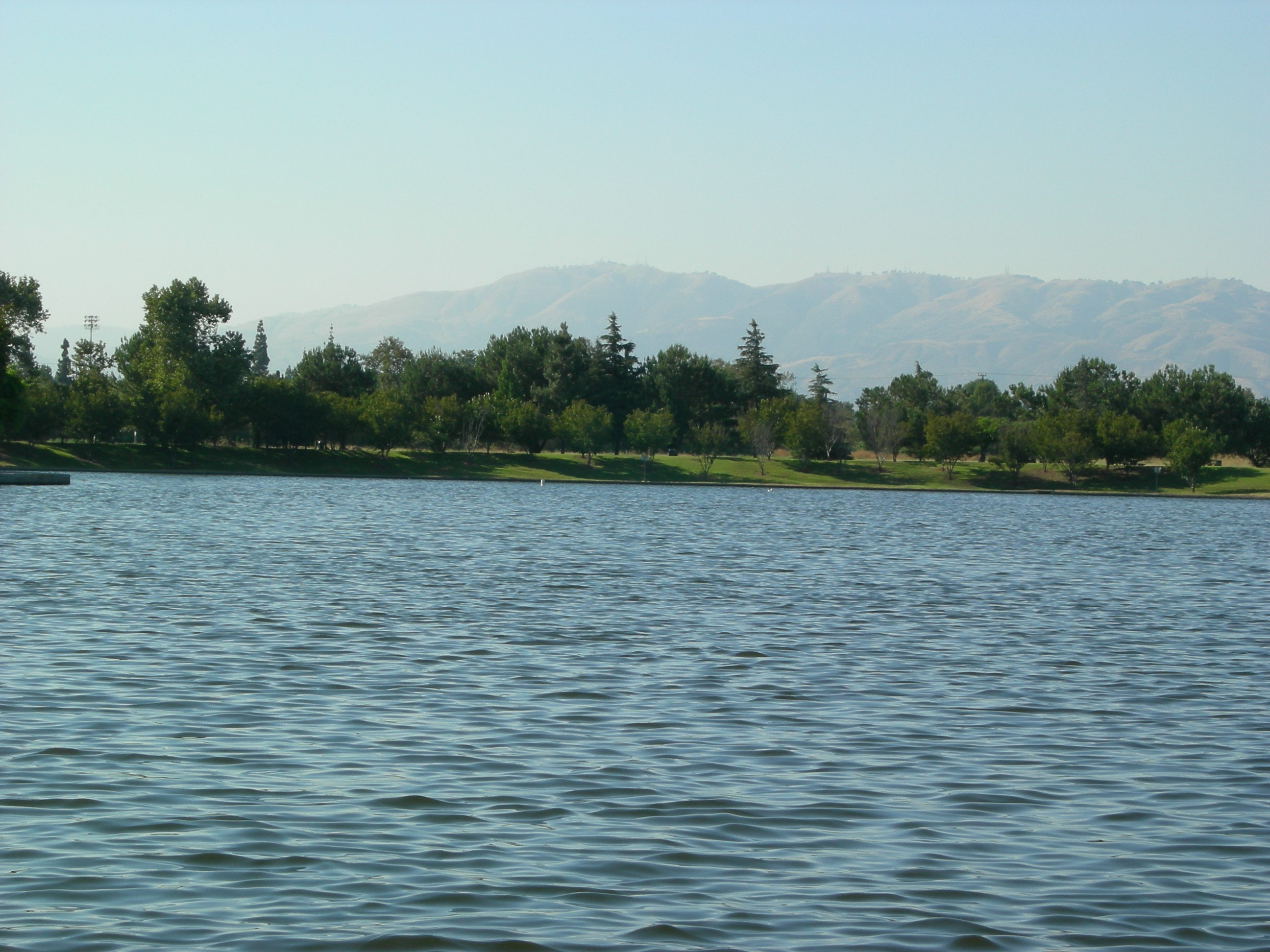
Lake Balboa, an artificial lake in Encino's Balboa Park

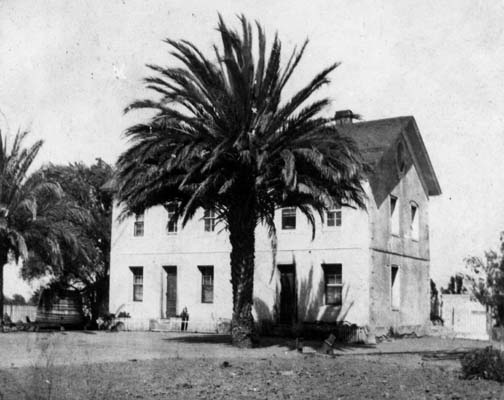
Rancho Los Encinos, part of the town's original namesake, 1900
