= Janet Cobbs =

American/Canadian volleyball coach

Personal information
- Full name: Janet Marie Cobbs (-Mulholland)
- Born: February 22, 1967 (age 59); Garden Grove, California, U.S.
- Height: 6 ft 0 in (183 cm)
- Education: North Dakota State University

Volleyball information
- Position: Outside hitter
- Number: 12

National team
1989–1994	United States
Medal record
Women's volleyball
Representing the United States
Olympic Games
Bronze medal – third place	1992 Barcelona	Team
World Championship
Bronze medal – third place	1990 China	Team

Janet Cobbs (born February 22, 1967) is an American/Canadian volleyball coach. During her playing career, she was an All-American at North Dakota State University and won a bronze medal with the United States women's national team at the 1992 Summer Olympics.

== Playing career ==
=== High school ===
Cobbs attended Concordia Academy High School in Roseville, Minnesota, where she played volleyball, basketball, and softball. She made the all-state team twice in both volleyball and basketball. In 1984, she led the volleyball team to the Class A state championship. In 1985, she was named the Metro Basketball Player of the Year.

=== College ===
Cobbs played for the North Dakota State University volleyball team from 1985 to 1988. She was a second-team All-American in 1986 and a first-team All-American in 1987. In 1988, Cobbs led the Bison to a 43–3 record and an NCAA Elite Eight appearance. She was named to the All-American first team again and was also named the Division II Player of the Year. She won the Honda-Broderick Trophy in 1988–89 as the Division II Female Athlete of the Year. Cobbs set nine NDSU school records, including most career kills (2,091) and most single-season kills (739).

Cobbs was inducted into the North Dakota State University Hall of Fame in 2003.

=== International ===
Cobbs was a member of the national team from 1989 to 1994. She won the bronze medal with the national team at the 1992 Summer Olympics in Barcelona. She was named the MVP of the 1992 Hong Kong Cup.

=== Professional ===
Cobbs played professionally for the Minnesota Monarchs (U.S.) in 1988–89, Ceramica Magica (Italy) in 1993–94, and Vakifbank (Turkey) in 1996–97.

== Coaching career ==
Cobbs was an assistant coach for North Dakota State and the University of Wisconsin–River Falls.

Cobbs is currently a head coach for the Cambridge Scorpions Volleyball Program in Ontario, Canada.

== Personal life ==
Cobbs was born in Garden Grove, California. She is 6 feet tall.
