= Providence Tarzana Medical Center =

Providence Cedars-Sinai Tarzana Medical Center
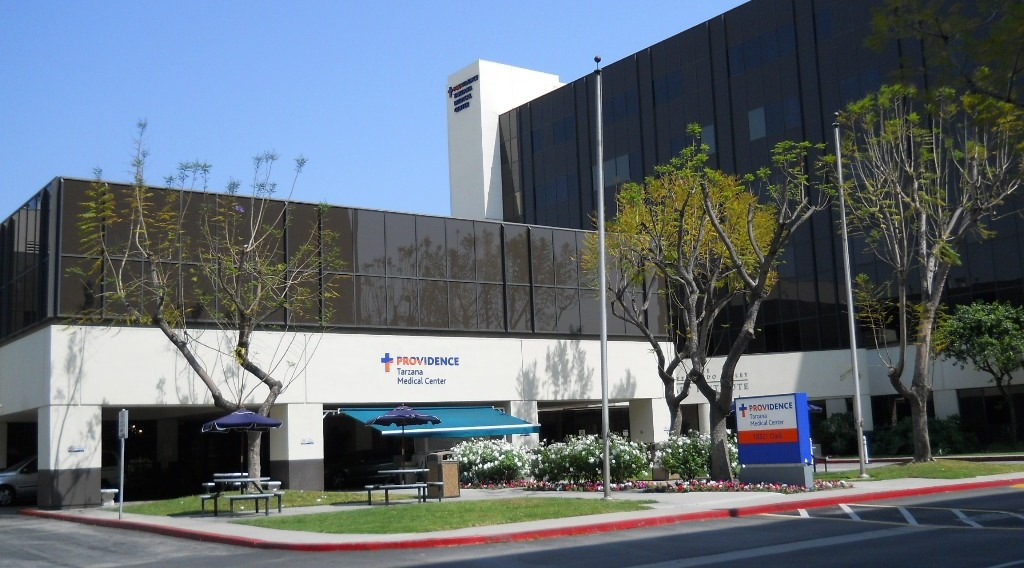

Geography
- Location: Tarzana, San Fernando Valley, California, United States
- Coordinates: 34.17034°N 118.53181°W

Organization
- Type: Community
- Network: Providence Health & Services

Services
- Beds: 245

History
- Founded: 2008

Links
- Website: www.providence.org/tarzana
- Lists: Hospitals in California

The Providence Cedars-Sinai Tarzana Medical Center is a hospital in Tarzana, California. The hospital's ownership changed in July 2008 when Tenet Healthcare sold it to the current owner, Providence Health & Services. Previously, the hospital was one of the campuses of the Encino-Tarzana Regional Medical Center.
