= Encino Hospital Medical Center =

- Prime Healthcare
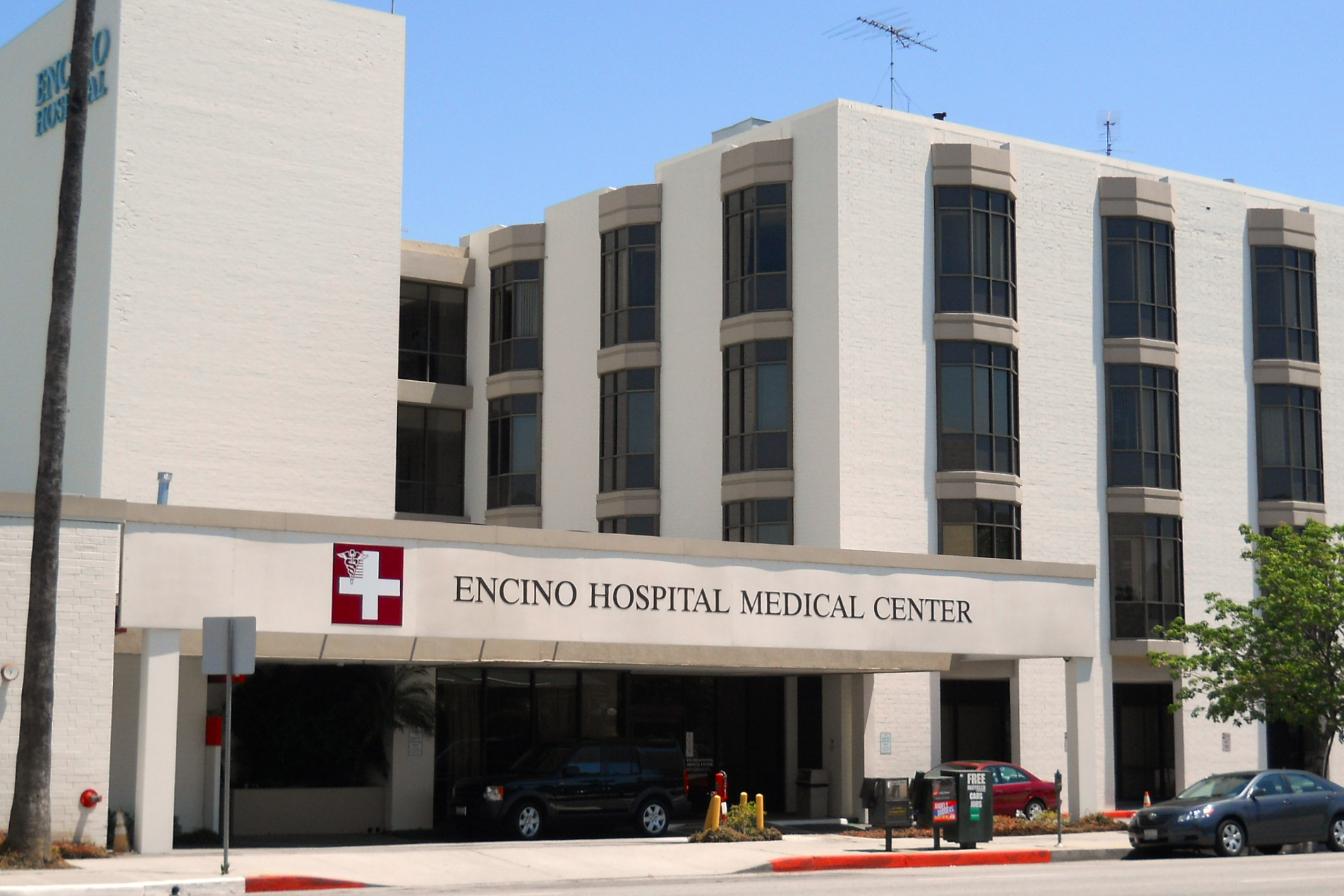

Geography
- Location: Encino, Los Angeles, San Fernando Valley, California, United States
- Coordinates: 34.15711°N 118.48664°W

Organization
- Type: Community

Services
- Beds: Total 148

Helipads
- Helipad: None

History
- Founded: November 8, 1954

Links
- Website: EncinoMed.com
- Lists: Hospitals in California

The Encino Hospital Medical Center is a hospital in Encino, California. The hospital's ownership changed in June 2008 when Tenet Healthcare sold it to the current owner, Prime Healthcare. Previously, the hospital was one of the campuses of the Encino-Tarzana Regional Medical Center.
