= Minnesota Monarchs =

Major League Volleyball franchise

The Minnesota Monarchs were one of six Major League Volleyball franchises. The league began in 1987 and ended short of completing a full season in 1989.

The Minnesota franchise was reported to be the strongest in terms of attendance, repeatedly filling the stands time after time. In 1987, the Monarchs led Major League Volleyball in attendance with an average of 2,000 fans per game. In 1988, they drew a total of 22,000 fans during the season. The Monarchs played at Si Melby Hall at Augsburg College, Minneapolis during the regular season and at Williams Arena at the campus of the University of Minnesota during playoff matches.

The Monarchs set a league attendance record of 3,404 in the Minnesota-San Jose semifinal match on May 20, 1988, at Williams Arena.

Unfortunately the team was lackluster in 1987 coming in last place. However, some trading and new talent (such as Ruth Lawanson and Linda Chisolm) joined the next season and the team improved. The team finished in second place in 1988 and was leading the league in matches won before the league ended in 1989.

Ownership of the franchise switched hands prior to the 1989 season. For the first two years of operation, the league itself owned its six franchises. R. Steven Arnold, founder of the league and league commissioner for the 1987 and 1988 seasons became team President. Lee Meade Sr., General Manager for the Monarchs during the 1987 season, returned as GM for the 1989 season. Leo W. Lund was the owner from 1987-1989. David L. Mona, CEO of a Twin Cities-based public relations firm, became Vice President of the team.

== Players ==
1987

MB=Middle Blocker, OH=Outside Hitter, S=Setter

Angie DeGroot: S

Jill Halstead: OH

Lucia Chudy: MB

McDougal: MB

Jerry McGahan (Volleyball Hall of Fame member): Right Side

Annie Adamczak: OH, college-Nebraska, hometown-Moose Lake, Mn.

Karen Dahlgren: MB, college-Nebraska

Head Coach: Jim Coleman

1988 (16 wins-6 losses)

PLAYER HT. POS. COLLEGE HOMETOWN

Judy Bellomo, 5-10, MB, UC Santa Barbara, Glendale, Ca

Merja Connolly, 6-0, MB, UCLA, Culver City, Ca.

Kathy Crotty-Rodgers, 5-9, OH/S, SW Missouri, Belleville, Ill.

Ellen Hensler, 5-8, S, Penn State, North Huntington, Pa.

Ruth Lawanson, 5-8, OH, Fresno St., Fresno, Ca. - 1988 League MVP

Head Coach: Walt Weaver

Ass't Coach: Jeff Nelson

1989

No. PLAYER HT. POS. COLLEGE HOMETOWN

1 Diane Ratnik, 6-1, S/MB, Canadian National, Scarborough, Ont.

6 Sari Virtanen-Stevens, 6-0, OH/MB, BYU, Provo, UT

7 Ruth Lawanson, 5-8, OH, Fresno St., Fresno, Ca.

8 Jill Halstead, 5-9, OH, Minnesota, Brooklyn Park, MN

10 Jackie Silva, 5-7, S, Brazil National, Rio de Janeiro, Brazil

11 Judy Bellomo, 5-10, OH/MB, UC Santa Barbara, Glendale, CA

12 Ellen Crandall-Orner, 6-0, OH/MB, Penn State, Rockton, Pa.

13 Janet Cobbs, 6-0, MB, North Dakota St., St. Paul, Mn.

14 Lori Zeno, 5-9, OH/S, UCLA, Fountain Valley, Ca.

Head Coach: Jeff Nelson

Ass't Coach: Steve Willingham
