= Pat Zartman =

American volleyball coach

Pat Zartman is a volleyball coach, and was the United States women's national volleyball team coach from 1970 to 1974. He was coach of the Los Angeles Starlites in 1987.

Zartman formerly taught AP Psychology and AP US History at Torrance High School. He and his wife, Sharkie, live in Hermosa Beach, California. Zartman is also the longest-serving teacher in Torrance High history, teaching for 48 years upon his retirement at the end of the 2018-2019 school year.
