= San Jose Golddiggers =

The San Jose Golddiggers were a professional women's team in Major League Volleyball from 1987 to 1989. The team played its home matches at the San Jose Civic Auditorium (capacity 2,200 for volleyball). Upon the league’s formation in 1986, the team was announced as the San Francisco Golddiggers. In its first season the team was known as the San Francisco/San Jose Golddiggers.

== History ==
The Golddiggers were one of six original teams in Major League Volleyball. The league began in 1987 and ended short of completing a full season in 1989. Players consisted of former collegiate All-Americans and Olympians. The level of play was highly competitive (above that of even the best Division I college teams) and the action was fast-paced.

The Golddiggers placed 2nd in 1987, 2nd in 1988 and were in 2nd when the league ceased operations midway through the season in 1989.

One of two west coast powerhouse teams, the Golddiggers started as the San Francisco/San Jose Golddiggers in 1987, becoming the San Jose Golddiggers in 1988, due to the team having the largest season ticket holder base and the fact that they were the attendance leaders for MLV.

The general manager of the team was Roseann Kuryla and the director of marketing and sales was Jim Dugoni. During years one and two, all of the teams were owned by Major League Volleyball and its shareholders led by Robert Batinovich of Glenborough Corp. During year three, the Golddiggers were owned by local Los Altos, California, businessmen Gary D. Schwing and Michael Cotsworth.

Rules for volleyball in the late 1980s were different from today. The ball could not touch the net on a serve, games were to 15, and points could only be scored on serves (no rally scoring). In 1988 the league changed the rules so that game five would move to rally scoring until one team reached 10; then it reverted to sideout scoring. This was primarily to control the length of matches for television.

== Team rosters ==
=== 1987 ===
1-Terry DeBusk (S); 5-Laurie Corbelli (MB); 4-Vicki Cantrell (OH); 11-Julie Maginot (OH); 6-Eileen Dempster (MB); 14-Lisa Ice (OH); 8-Christa Cook (OH); 10-Kelly Strand (OH); 12-Gayle Stammer (MB); Shelton Collier (head coach); Max Kernaghan (asst. coach)

=== 1988 ===
8-Wendi Rush (S); 5-Laurie Corbelli (MB); 4-Vicki Cantrell (OH); 1-Julie Maginot (OH); 6-Eileen Dempster (MB); 11-Nancy Reno (MB); 10-Kelly Strand (OH); 9-Toni Tedeschi (MB); Dave DeGroot (head coach); Burt Fuller and Max Kernaghan (asst. coaches)

=== 1989 ===
7-Teri DeBusk (S); 5-Laurie Corbelli (MB-OH); 4-Vicki Cantrell (OH); 1-Julie Maginot (OH); 6-Eileen Dempster (MB); 8-Christa Cook (OH); 15-Jayne McHugh (MB); 2-Mary Miller (MB); 13-Barbara Higgins (MB); 11-Ellen Bugalski (MB); Greg Giovanozzi (head coach); Burt Fuller and Max Kernaghan (asst. coaches)

Laurie Corbelli was team captain and without question the leader on the court. A 1980 (boycotted by USA) and 1984 Olympian, Corbelli was the Major League Volleyball MVP in 1987.

Vicki Cantrell was the main scoring threat for the Golddiggers, 2nd in kills in 1987 with 361 and leading the team in kills in 1988 with 337. Cantrell was a first team All-American at San Diego State and was enshrined into the Aztec Sports Hall Of Fame in 1997.

In 1987 the team played for the MLV championship, losing to the Los Angeles Starlites in five games. The Golddiggers were the host city for the 1987 MLV finals, due to the teams attendance success.

In 1988 the team recruited Stanford stars Nancy Reno and Wendi Rush. The Golddiggers again reached the MLV finals, again losing to the Los Angeles Starlites, this time in three games.

In 1989, the Golddiggers got back setter Teri DeBusk, who was loaned to the Arizona Blaze for the 1988 season, Teri was the Golddiggers setter in 1987 and was a local star at San Jose State. When the league ceased operations in mid-season of 1989 the league rewarded the team with the honor of hosting the final match in MLV league history, the 1989 MLV All Star Match.
