= Los Angeles Starlites =

The Los Angeles Starlites were one of six teams in the Major League Volleyball (MLV) franchise. The league began in 1987 and ended short of completing a full season in 1989. Players consisted of former collegiate All-Americans and Olympians. The level of play was highly competitive (above that of even the best Division I college teams) and fast paced, and utilized either a 5-1 or 6-2 offense.

Coached by Pat Zartman, the Starlites placed first in 1987. They also placed first in 1988. Despite their performance, the team's attendance averaged only 800 fans per game, among the lowest in the league in 1987. In 1988, they drew only 3,000 total fans in their 11 home games. The team played its home games at several different venues during the 1987 and 1988 seasons, which may have contributed to its low attendance numbers. The Starlites played their home games at UC Irvine's Bren Center during the 1989 season.

Rules in the late 1980s were a bit different from current volleyball rules. The ball could not touch the net on a serve, and games were to 15 points, with no rally scoring. In 1988 the franchise changed the rules so that game five would move to rally scoring.

== Starlites roster ==
- Rita Crockett-Royster – outside hitter (1987–1988)
- Jeanie Beauprey-Reeves – outside hitter (1987–1988)
- Patty Dodd – outside hitter (1987)
- Wendy Stammer – middle blocker (1988)
- Dale Keough-Hall – outside hitter (1988)
- Lisa Ettesvold (1988)
- Debbie Green-Vargas – setter (1987)
- Diane Pestolasi (1988)
- Carol Czar – middle blocker (1987)
- Tracy Clark – outside hitter (1987)
- Michelle Boyette – setter (1988)
- Kris Roberts - (1988)
- Lori Zeno - 1988

Debbie Green-Vargas is perhaps the most effective American female setter of all time. Green-Vargas is only 5'4" tall. During an MLV match, Green-Vargas's chronic back problem almost put her out of the game. She stuck it out, although obviously in a great deal of pain, to lead the team to victory.

Rita Crockett was awarded a Major League MVP award. Even while Crockett was pregnant, with daughter Marrita, it was not uncommon to see her breaking boards at the 10' line. Rita Crockett is reported to have a 42" vertical jump.

Patty Arosco married volleyball player Mike Dodd. Dodd himself later won the silver medal in beach volleyball at the 1996 Olympics.

Hall and Crockett played while they were pregnant. Rita was told not to dive so she played defense cautiously.
