= Major League Volleyball (1987) =

American women's volleyball league, 1987–1989

- Sport: Volleyball
- Founded: 1987
- First season: 1987
- Folded: 1989
- Commissioner: Steve Arnold (1987-1988), Lindy Vivas (1988-1989)
- No. of teams: 6
- Country: United States
- Continent: North America

Major League Volleyball (MLV) was a women's professional volleyball league in the United States. It was established in 1987 and disbanded during its third season on March 20, 1989.

The league was launched in 1987 with six teams consisting of nine players per team, most of them former Olympians or college All-Americans. According to the league's first commissioner, Steve Arnold, each MLV player received a base salary of $5,500 per season. Bonuses were awarded to teams for each victory and for a top-three finish, while the team that won the league championship received $25,000. Bonuses were also awarded to players for excelling in one of six statistical categories. For example, the player who was best in serving aces got an extra $3,000. The egalitarian pay scale made contract negotiations unnecessary.

There were no independent team owners during the first two years of the league's existence. Instead, there were essentially six major shareholders. "It was a concept I developed through having operated pro sports leagues and teams," said Arnold, an attorney who had been a sports agent and was involved with the World Football League, American Basketball Association, World Hockey Association and World TeamTennis. Before the league's third and final season began in 1989, Major League Volleyball granted licensing agreements to ownership groups for each of the league's six teams. The initial licensing fee paid by each ownership group was $100,000. During the MLV's two years in operation they gave out awards for Most Valuable Player (MVP). In the leagues first season in 1987 it was given to Rita Crockett. And in 1988 it was awarded to Ruth Lawson of the Minnesota Monarchs.

The MLV draft was open to any American players who did not have collegiate eligibility and did not play for a professional league in another country or on the U.S. national volleyball team. Through a trust agreement with the USVBL, the players retained their Olympic eligibility.

MLV got a contract with ESPN to televise 10 regular season contests on a tape delay basis, and a playoff game and live coverage of the league's championship match. It had a solid start in attendance with crowds between 350 and 3,000 in the opening weeks of competition in 1987. The three-day championship tournament held at Williams Arena in 1988 had a total attendance of 7,072, including 3,404 (a league record) for the semifinal match between the San Jose Golddiggers and Minnesota Monarchs on Friday, May 20.

The league had only two sets of warmups circulating among its teams until two weeks into the first season. And the game uniforms, ordered from Japan, were in quarantine until two days before the season opened.

The content, records, and player information were obtained from a collection of VCR recordings of the original ESPN broadcasts. Commentary on players is credited to MLV sports analyst and host Chris Marlowe.

== Franchises ==
- Chicago Breeze (1987–1989)
- Dallas Belles (1987)/Arizona Blaze (1988)/Portland Spikers (1989)
- Los Angeles Starlites (1987–1989)
- Minnesota Monarchs (1987–1989)
- New York Liberties (1987–1989)
- San Jose Golddiggers (1987–1989)
- Sacramento Stars (1987–1989)

== Champions ==
- 1987 Los Angeles Starlites (3–2 vs San Francisco/San Jose Golddiggers )
- 1988 Los Angeles Starlites (3–0 vs San Jose Golddiggers)
- 1989 No Champion (Minnesota had the best record at time of disbanding.)
